= 2019–20 IIHF Continental Cup =

2019–2020 IIHF Continental Cup

Tournament details
- Dates: 20 September 2019 – 12 January 2020
- Teams: 20

Final positions
- Champions: (Denmark) SønderjyskE Ishockey (1st title)
- Runners-up: (United Kingdom) Nottingham Panthers
- Third place: (Belarus) Neman Grodno
- Fourth place: (Poland) Cracovia

Tournament statistics
- Games played: 42

The 2019–20 Continental Cup was the 23rd edition of the IIHF Continental Cup, Europe's second-tier ice hockey club competition organised by International Ice Hockey Federation. The season started on 20 September 2019 and the final tournament was played from 10 to 12 January 2020.

== Qualified teams ==
| Team | Qualification |
Enter in the third round
| (Belarus) Neman Grodno | 2018 Belarusian Cup winners |
| (Denmark) SønderjyskE Ishockey | 2018–19 Metal Ligaen runners-up |
| (France) Gothiques d'Amiens | 2018–19 Coupe de France winners |
| (United Kingdom) Nottingham Panthers | 2018–19 EIHL season third place |
| (Kazakhstan) Beibarys Atyrau | 2018–19 Kazakhstan Hockey Championship champions |
| (Poland) Cracovia | 2018–19 Polska Hokej Liga runners-up |
Enter in the second round
| (Hungary) Ferencvárosi TC | 2018–19 OB I bajnokság champions |
| (Italy) Ritten Sport | 2018–19 IHL - Elite champions |
| (Latvia) Mogo Riga | 2018–19 Latvian Hockey Higher League champions |
| (Romania) Corona Brașov | 2018–19 Romanian Hockey League champions |
| (Slovenia) Olimpija Ljubljana | 2018–19 Slovenian Ice Hockey League champions |
| (Ukraine) HC Donbass | 2018–19 Ukrainian Hockey League champions |
Enter in the first round
| (Belgium) HYC Herentals | 2018–19 BeNe League champions |
| (Bulgaria) Irbis-Skate Sofia | 2018–19 Bulgarian Hockey League champions |
| (Croatia) KHL Zagreb | 2018–19 Croatian Ice Hockey League champions |
| (Iceland) Skautafélag Akureyrar | 2018–19 Icelandic Hockey League champions |
| (Israel) HC Bat Yam | 2018–19 Israeli Hockey League champions |
| (Serbia) Crvena Zvezda | 2018–19 Serbian Hockey League champions |
| (Spain) Txuri Urdin | 2018–19 Liga Nacional de Hockey Hielo champions |
| (Turkey) Zeytinburnu Belediyespor | 2018–19 Turkish Ice Hockey Super League champions |

== First round ==
=== Group A ===
The Group A tournament was played in Istanbul, Turkey, from 20 to 22 September 2019.

| Pos | Team | Pld | W | OTW | OTL | L | GF | GA | GD | Pts | Qualification |
|---|---|---|---|---|---|---|---|---|---|---|---|
| 1 | (Serbia) Crvena Zvezda | 3 | 3 | 0 | 0 | 0 | 17 | 6 | +11 | 9 | Second round |
| 2 | (Turkey) Zeytinburnu Belediyespor (H) | 3 | 2 | 0 | 0 | 1 | 11 | 12 | −1 | 6 | |
| 3 | (Bulgaria) Irbis-Skate Sofia | 3 | 1 | 0 | 0 | 2 | 9 | 10 | −1 | 3 | |
| 4 | (Iceland) Skautafélag Akureyrar | 3 | 0 | 0 | 0 | 3 | 4 | 13 | −9 | 0 | |

Source: IIHF
(H) Host

All times are local (UTC+3).

| 20 September 2019; 16:00 | Skautafélag Akureyrar (Iceland) | 1–6 (1–2, 0–2, 0–2) | (Serbia) Crvena Zvezda | Silivrikapı Ice Skating Hall; Attendance: 80 |

Game reference
| 8 min | Penalties | 10 min |
| 14 | Shots | 36 |

| 20 September 2019; 20:00 | Irbis-Skate Sofia (Bulgaria) | 3–5 (1–1, 1–2, 1–2) | (Turkey) Zeytinburnu Belediyespor | Silivrikapı Ice Skating Hall; Attendance: 220 |

Game reference
| 16 min | Penalties | 14 min |
| 27 | Shots | 30 |

| 21 September 2019; 14:00 | Irbis-Skate Sofia (Bulgaria) | 3–0 (1–0, 1–0, 1–0) | (Iceland) Skautafélag Akureyrar | Silivrikapı Ice Skating Hall; Attendance: 92 |

Game reference
| 10 min | Penalties | 6 min |
| 24 | Shots | 28 |

| 21 September 2019; 18:00 | Crvena Zvezda (Serbia) | 6–2 (1–1, 2–1, 3–0) | (Turkey) Zeytinburnu Belediyespor | Silivrikapı Ice Skating Hall; Attendance: 140 |

Game reference
| 12 min | Penalties | 18 min |
| 32 | Shots | 26 |

| 22 September 2019; 14:00 | Crvena Zvezda (Serbia) | 5–3 (0–0, 4–2, 1–1) | (Bulgaria) Irbis-Skate Sofia | Silivrikapı Ice Skating Hall; Attendance: 64 |

Game reference
| 14 min | Penalties | 26 min |
| 30 | Shots | 28 |

| 22 September 2019; 18:00 | Zeytinburnu Belediyespor (Turkey) | 4–3 (0–0, 1–3, 3–0) | (Iceland) Skautafélag Akureyrar | Silivrikapı Ice Skating Hall; Attendance: 172 |

Game reference
| 2 min | Penalties | 10 min |
| 35 | Shots | 35 |

=== Group B ===
The Group B tournament was played in Mechelen, Belgium, from 20 to 22 September 2019.

| Pos | Team | Pld | W | OTW | OTL | L | GF | GA | GD | Pts | Qualification |
|---|---|---|---|---|---|---|---|---|---|---|---|
| 1 | (Spain) Txuri Urdin | 3 | 3 | 0 | 0 | 0 | 17 | 7 | +10 | 9 | Second round |
| 2 | (Croatia) KHL Zagreb | 3 | 2 | 0 | 0 | 1 | 17 | 13 | +4 | 6 | |
| 3 | (Belgium) HYC Herentals (H) | 3 | 1 | 0 | 0 | 2 | 11 | 13 | −2 | 3 | |
| 4 | (Israel) HC Bat Yam | 3 | 0 | 0 | 0 | 3 | 12 | 24 | −12 | 0 | |

Source: IIHF
(H) Host

All times are local (UTC+2).

| 20 September 2019; 16:00 | Txuri Urdin (Spain) | 7–1 (5–0, 0–1, 2–0) | (Croatia) KHL Zagreb | Ice Skating Center Mechelen; Attendance: 111 |

Game reference
| 20 min | Penalties | 10 min |
| 37 | Shots | 41 |

| 20 September 2019; 20:00 | HYC Herentals (Belgium) | 7–4 (1–3, 2–0, 4–1) | (Israel) HC Bat Yam | Ice Skating Center Mechelen; Attendance: 280 |

Game reference
| 33 min | Penalties | 18 min |
| 56 | Shots | 26 |

| 21 September 2019; 16:00 | KHL Zagreb (Croatia) | 12–4 (4–0, 5–2, 3–2) | (Israel) HC Bat Yam | Ice Skating Center Mechelen; Attendance: 200 |

Game reference
| 12 min | Penalties | 22 min |
| 64 | Shots | 31 |

| 21 September 2019; 20:00 | HYC Herentals (Belgium) | 2–5 (0–3, 0–1, 2–1) | (Spain) Txuri Urdin | Ice Skating Center Mechelen; Attendance: 320 |

Game reference
| 14 min | Penalties | 14 min |
| 36 | Shots | 52 |

| 22 September 2019; 16:00 | HC Bat Yam (Israel) | 4–5 (0–1, 3–1, 1–3) | (Spain) Txuri Urdin | Ice Skating Center Mechelen; Attendance: 180 |

Game reference
| 43 min | Penalties | 6 min |
| 28 | Shots | 65 |

| 22 September 2019; 20:00 | KHL Zagreb (Croatia) | 4–2 (1–0, 3–2, 0–0) | (Belgium) HYC Herentals | Ice Skating Center Mechelen; Attendance: 295 |

Game reference
| 42 min | Penalties | 16 min |
| 33 | Shots | 38 |

== Second round ==
=== Group C ===
The Group C tournament was played in Brovary, Ukraine, from 18 to 20 October 2019.

| Pos | Team | Pld | W | OTW | OTL | L | GF | GA | GD | Pts | Qualification |
|---|---|---|---|---|---|---|---|---|---|---|---|
| 1 | (Ukraine) HC Donbass (H) | 3 | 2 | 1 | 0 | 0 | 17 | 3 | +14 | 8 | Third round |
| 2 | (Latvia) Mogo Riga | 3 | 2 | 0 | 1 | 0 | 13 | 7 | +6 | 7 | |
| 3 | (Romania) Corona Brașov | 3 | 1 | 0 | 0 | 2 | 11 | 16 | −5 | 3 | |
| 4 | (Serbia) Crvena Zvezda | 3 | 0 | 0 | 0 | 3 | 5 | 20 | −15 | 0 | |

Source: IIHF
(H) Host

All times are local (UTC+3).

| 18 October 2019; 16:00 | Corona Brașov (Romania) | 3–5 (0–2, 0–1, 3–2) | (Latvia) Mogo Riga | Terminal Ice Arena; Attendance: 254 |

Game reference
| 8 min | Penalties | 10 min |
| 20 | Shots | 41 |

| 18 October 2019; 19:30 | HC Donbass (Ukraine) | 7–0 (2–0, 2–0, 3–0) | (Serbia) Crvena Zvezda | Terminal Ice Arena; Attendance: 1,328 |

Game reference
| 4 min | Penalties | 8 min |
| 51 | Shots | 11 |

| 19 October 2019; 14:30 | Mogo Riga (Latvia) | 6–1 (2–0, 1–1, 3–0) | (Serbia) Crvena Zvezda | Terminal Ice Arena; Attendance: 311 |

Game reference
| 4 min | Penalties | 2 min |
| 53 | Shots | 25 |

| 19 October 2019; 18:30 | HC Donbass (Ukraine) | 7–1 (2–0, 2–1, 3–0) | (Romania) Corona Brașov | Terminal Ice Arena; Attendance: 1,514 |

Game reference
| 12 min | Penalties | 12 min |
| 42 | Shots | 29 |

| 20 October 2019; 14:30 | Crvena Zvezda (Serbia) | 4–7 (0–2, 2–3, 2–2) | (Romania) Corona Brașov | Terminal Ice Arena; Attendance: 329 |

Game reference
| 2 min | Penalties | 8 min |
| 23 | Shots | 38 |

| 20 October 2019; 18:30 | Mogo Riga (Latvia) | 2–3 GWS (0–0, 0–1, 2–1) (OT: 0–0) (SO: 0–1) | (Ukraine) HC Donbass | Terminal Ice Arena; Attendance: 1,933 |

Game reference
| 8 min | Penalties | 14 min |
| 28 | Shots | 29 |

=== Group D ===
The Group D tournament was played in Ritten, Italy, from 18 to 20 October 2019.

| Pos | Team | Pld | W | OTW | OTL | L | GF | GA | GD | Pts | Qualification |
|---|---|---|---|---|---|---|---|---|---|---|---|
| 1 | (Hungary) Ferencvárosi TC | 3 | 3 | 0 | 0 | 0 | 12 | 3 | +9 | 9 | Third round |
| 2 | (Italy) Ritten Sport (H) | 3 | 1 | 1 | 0 | 1 | 13 | 5 | +8 | 5 | |
| 3 | (Slovenia) Olimpija Ljubljana | 3 | 1 | 0 | 1 | 1 | 9 | 6 | +3 | 4 | |
| 4 | (Spain) Txuri Urdin | 3 | 0 | 0 | 0 | 3 | 2 | 22 | −20 | 0 | |

Source: IIHF
(H) Host

All times are local (UTC+2).

| 18 October 2019; 16:00 | Ferencvárosi TC (Hungary) | 6–0 (3–0, 2–0, 1–0) | (Spain) Txuri Urdin | Arena Ritten; Attendance: 250 |

Game reference
| 10 min | Penalties | 14 min |
| 65 | Shots | 16 |

| 18 October 2019; 20:00 | Olimpija Ljubljana (Slovenia) | 1–2 OT (0–1, 1–0, 0–0) (OT: 0–1) | (Italy) Ritten Sport | Arena Ritten; Attendance: 678 |

Game reference
| 16 min | Penalties | 20 min |
| 27 | Shots | 26 |

| 19 October 2019; 16:00 | Ferencvárosi TC (Hungary) | 3–2 (2–2, 1–0, 0–0) | (Slovenia) Olimpija Ljubljana | Arena Ritten; Attendance: 225 |

Game reference
| 10 min | Penalties | 8 min |
| 23 | Shots | 22 |

| 19 October 2019; 20:00 | Ritten Sport (Italy) | 10–1 (1–1, 4–0, 5–0) | (Spain) Txuri Urdin | Arena Ritten; Attendance: 837 |

Game reference
| 2 min | Penalties | 28 min |
| 60 | Shots | 15 |

| 20 October 2019; 14:00 | Txuri Urdin (Spain) | 1–6 (0–0, 0–3, 1–3) | (Slovenia) Olimpija Ljubljana | Arena Ritten; Attendance: 100 |

Game reference
| 26 min | Penalties | 54 min |
| 19 | Shots | 47 |

| 20 October 2019; 18:00 | Ritten Sport (Italy) | 1–3 (1–2, 0–0, 0–1) | (Hungary) Ferencvárosi TC | Arena Ritten; Attendance: 1,278 |

Game reference
| 12 min | Penalties | 12 min |
| 24 | Shots | 31 |

== Third round ==
=== Group E ===
The Group E tournament was played in Vojens, Denmark, from 15 to 17 November 2019.

| Pos | Team | Pld | W | OTW | OTL | L | GF | GA | GD | Pts | Qualification |
|---|---|---|---|---|---|---|---|---|---|---|---|
| 1 | (United Kingdom) Nottingham Panthers | 3 | 2 | 0 | 0 | 1 | 10 | 7 | +3 | 6 (Note: Nottingham Panthers 4–2 SønderjyskE Ishockey) | Final round |
| 2 | (Denmark) SønderjyskE Ishockey (H) | 3 | 2 | 0 | 0 | 1 | 8 | 6 | +2 | 6 | Final round |
| 3 | (France) Gothiques d'Amiens | 3 | 1 | 0 | 0 | 2 | 8 | 8 | 0 | 3 (Note: Ferencvárosi TC 1–5 Gothiques d'Amiens) | |
| 4 | (Hungary) Ferencvárosi TC | 3 | 1 | 0 | 0 | 2 | 5 | 10 | −5 | 3 | |

Source: IIHF
(H) Host
Notes:

All times are local (UTC+1).

| 15 November 2019; 16:00 | Gothiques d'Amiens (France) | 2–4 (1–1, 0–2, 1–1) | (United Kingdom) Nottingham Panthers | Frøs Arena; Attendance: 749 |

Game reference
| 8 min | Penalties | 4 min |
| 29 | Shots | 32 |

| 15 November 2019; 19:30 | SønderjyskE Ishockey (Denmark) | 3–1 (1–0, 1–1, 1–0) | (Hungary) Ferencvárosi TC | Frøs Arena; Attendance: 2,217 |

Game reference
| 4 min | Penalties | 4 min |
| 33 | Shots | 17 |

| 16 November 2019; 16:00 | Nottingham Panthers (United Kingdom) | 2–3 (1–1, 0–2, 1–0) | (Hungary) Ferencvárosi TC | Frøs Arena; Attendance: 678 |

Game reference
| 12 min | Penalties | 6 min |
| 41 | Shots | 24 |

| 16 November 2019; 19:30 | SønderjyskE Ishockey (Denmark) | 3–1 (0–0, 0–1, 3–0) | (France) Gothiques d'Amiens | Frøs Arena; Attendance: 2,519 |

Game reference
| 8 min | Penalties | 6 min |
| 40 | Shots | 31 |

| 17 November 2019; 15:00 | Ferencvárosi TC (Hungary) | 1–5 (0–0, 0–2, 1–3) | (France) Gothiques d'Amiens | Frøs Arena; Attendance: 521 |

Game reference
| 10 min | Penalties | 18 min |
| 34 | Shots | 34 |

| 17 November 2019; 18:30 | Nottingham Panthers (United Kingdom) | 4–2 (1–0, 3–1, 0–1) | (Denmark) SønderjyskE Ishockey | Frøs Arena; Attendance: 2,640 |

Game reference
| 16 min | Penalties | 12 min |
| 24 | Shots | 42 |

=== Group F ===
The Group F tournament was played in Kraków, Poland, from 15 to 17 November 2019.

| Pos | Team | Pld | W | OTW | OTL | L | GF | GA | GD | Pts | Qualification |
|---|---|---|---|---|---|---|---|---|---|---|---|
| 1 | (Belarus) Neman Grodno | 3 | 1 | 1 | 0 | 1 | 10 | 8 | +2 | 5 (Note: Neman Grodno 5 Pts; Cracovia 2 Pts; HC Donbass 2 Pts. Cracovia defeated HC Donbass 2–1 in shootouts.) | Final round |
| 2 | (Poland) Cracovia (H) | 3 | 1 | 1 | 0 | 1 | 6 | 7 | −1 | 5 | Final round |
| 3 | (Ukraine) HC Donbass | 3 | 1 | 0 | 2 | 0 | 9 | 9 | 0 | 5 | |
| 4 | (Kazakhstan) Beibarys Atyrau | 3 | 1 | 0 | 0 | 2 | 9 | 10 | −1 | 3 | |

Source: IIHF
(H) Host
Notes:

All times are local (UTC+1).

| 15 November 2019; 14:00 | Neman Grodno (Belarus) | 4–3 OT (2–0, 0–1, 1–2) (OT: 1–0) | (Ukraine) HC Donbass | Adam Roch Kowalski Ice Rink; Attendance: 400 |

Game reference
| 6 min | Penalties | 22 min |
| 18 | Shots | 19 |

| 15 November 2019; 19:00 | Cracovia (Poland) | 3–2 (2–1, 0–0, 1–1) | (Kazakhstan) Beibarys Atyrau | Adam Roch Kowalski Ice Rink; Attendance: 1,000 |

Game reference
| 6 min | Penalties | 12 min |
| 27 | Shots | 30 |

| 16 November 2019; 14:00 | Beibarys Atyrau (Kazakhstan) | 3–5 (1–1, 1–3, 1–1) | (Ukraine) HC Donbass | Adam Roch Kowalski Ice Rink; Attendance: 900 |

Game reference
| 18 min | Penalties | 10 min |
| 29 | Shots | 34 |

| 16 November 2019; 19:00 | Neman Grodno (Belarus) | 4–1 (0–0, 4–0, 0–1) | (Poland) Cracovia | Adam Roch Kowalski Ice Rink; Attendance: 1,400 |

Game reference
| 4 min | Penalties | 12 min |
| 30 | Shots | 11 |

| 17 November 2019; 14:00 | Beibarys Atyrau (Kazakhstan) | 4–2 (2–2, 2–0, 0–0) | (Belarus) Neman Grodno | Adam Roch Kowalski Ice Rink; Attendance: 300 |

Game reference
| 14 min | Penalties | 12 min |
| 18 | Shots | 12 |

| 17 November 2019; 19:00 | HC Donbass (Ukraine) | 1–2 GWS (0–0, 0–1, 1–0) (OT: 0–0) (SO: 0–1) | (Poland) Cracovia | Adam Roch Kowalski Ice Rink; Attendance: 1,400 |

Game reference
| 6 min | Penalties | 6 min |
| 28 | Shots | 24 |

== Final round ==
Continental Cup Final tournament was played in Vojens, Denmark, from 10 to 12 January 2020.

| Pos | Team | Pld | W | OTW | OTL | L | GF | GA | GD | Pts | Qualification |
|---|---|---|---|---|---|---|---|---|---|---|---|
| 1 | (Denmark) SønderjyskE Ishockey (H) | 3 | 1 | 2 | 0 | 0 | 9 | 5 | +4 | 7 (Note: SønderjyskE Ishockey 2–1 (GWS) Nottingham Panthers) | Champions Hockey League |
| 2 | (United Kingdom) Nottingham Panthers | 3 | 2 | 0 | 1 | 0 | 9 | 8 | +1 | 7 | |
| 3 | (Belarus) Neman Grodno | 3 | 1 | 0 | 1 | 1 | 8 | 8 | 0 | 4 | |
| 4 | (Poland) Cracovia | 3 | 0 | 0 | 0 | 3 | 4 | 9 | −5 | 0 | |

Source: IIHF
(H) Host
Notes:

All times are local (UTC+1).

| 10 January 2020; 16:00 | Neman Grodno (Belarus) | 2–0 (0–0, 2–0, 0–0) | (Poland) Cracovia | Frøs Arena; Attendance: 673 |

Game reference
| Vitali Trus | Goalies | Miroslav Kopřiva | Referees: (Czech Republic) Adam Kika (Switzerland) Marc Wiegand; Linesmen: (United Kingdom) Danny Beresford (Denmark) Rene Jensen |
| Hurri (Hiltunen) – 20:57 / 1–0; Kisly (Grishanov, Remezov) (PP) – 26:02 / 2–0 | | | Referees: (Czech Republic) Adam Kika (Switzerland) Marc Wiegand; Linesmen: (United Kingdom) Danny Beresford (Denmark) Rene Jensen |
| 8 min | Penalties | 6 min | Referees: (Czech Republic) Adam Kika (Switzerland) Marc Wiegand; Linesmen: (United Kingdom) Danny Beresford (Denmark) Rene Jensen |
| 29 | Shots | 32 | Referees: (Czech Republic) Adam Kika (Switzerland) Marc Wiegand; Linesmen: (United Kingdom) Danny Beresford (Denmark) Rene Jensen |

| 10 January 2020; 19:30 | SønderjyskE Ishockey (Denmark) | 2–1 GWS (0–0, 0–1, 1–0) (OT: 0–0) (SO: 1–0) | (United Kingdom) Nottingham Panthers | Frøs Arena; Attendance: 3,368 |

Game reference
| Nicolaj Henriksen | Goalies | Kevin Carr | Referees: (Finland) Aaro Brännare (Germany) Daniel Piechaczek; Linesmen: (France) Clément Goncalves (Austria) Elias Seewald |
| / 0–1 / 38:29 – Connelly (Hansen, Matheson) (PP); Frank (Sharp, Galbraith) – 56:51 / 1–1 | | | Referees: (Finland) Aaro Brännare (Germany) Daniel Piechaczek; Linesmen: (France) Clément Goncalves (Austria) Elias Seewald |
| Frank (miss); MacDonald (miss); Maylan; Bjerrum | Shootout | (miss) Perlini; (miss) Herr; (miss) Hansen; (miss) Connelly | Referees: (Finland) Aaro Brännare (Germany) Daniel Piechaczek; Linesmen: (France) Clément Goncalves (Austria) Elias Seewald |
| 6 min | Penalties | 16 min | Referees: (Finland) Aaro Brännare (Germany) Daniel Piechaczek; Linesmen: (France) Clément Goncalves (Austria) Elias Seewald |
| 54 | Shots | 24 | Referees: (Finland) Aaro Brännare (Germany) Daniel Piechaczek; Linesmen: (France) Clément Goncalves (Austria) Elias Seewald |

| 11 January 2020; 16:00 | Nottingham Panthers (United Kingdom) | 4–3 (0–2, 1–1, 3–0) | (Poland) Cracovia | Frøs Arena; Attendance: 879 |

Game reference

Kevin Carr
Goalies
Miroslav Kopřiva
Referees:
(Norway) Christian Persson
(Germany) Daniel Piechaczek
Linesmen:
(Germany) Andreas Hofer
(Denmark) Rene Jensen

| | 0–1 | 03:26 – Kapica (Bahenský) |
| | 0–2 | 15:56 – Vachovec (Jáchym, Bryniczka) (PP) |
| | 0–3 | 21:47 – Kapica (Gula) (PP) |
| Hansen (Malmquist, Matheson) – 27:19 | 1–3 |
| Talbot (Herr, Matheson) (PP) – 50:45 | 2–3 |
| Herr (Matheson, Hansen) (PP) – 55:25 | 3–3 |
| Herr (Hansen) (ENG) – 59:59 | 4–3 |

8 min
Penalties
6 min
47
Shots
22

| 11 January 2020; 19:30 | Neman Grodno (Belarus) | 3–4 OT (0–0, 1–1, 2–2) (OT: 0–1) | (Denmark) SønderjyskE Ishockey | Frøs Arena; Attendance: 3,190 |

Game reference

Vitali Trus
Goalies
Adam Ohre
Referees:
(Czech Republic) Adam Kika
(Switzerland) Marc Wiegand
Linesmen:
(United Kingdom) Danny Beresford
(Austria) Elias Seewald

| | 0–1 | 25:23 – Frank (Sharp) (PP) |
| Levsha (Hiltunen, Turkin) – 30:31 | 1–1 |
| | 1–2 | 43:52 – Little (Maylan) |
| Malyavko – 48:06 | 2–2 |
| Savinov (Varivonchik) – 49:16 | 3–2 |
| | 3–3 | 55:34 – Sharp (Little) (PP) |
| | 3–4 | 63:18 – Little |

6 min
Penalties
8 min
32
Shots
29

| 12 January 2020; 15:30 | Cracovia (Poland) | 1–3 (0–1, 0–1, 1–1) | (Denmark) SønderjyskE Ishockey | Frøs Arena; Attendance: 4,107 |

Game reference

Miroslav Kopřiva
Goalies
Nicolaj Henriksen
Referees:
(Finland) Aaro Brännare
(Germany) Daniel Piechaczek
Linesmen:
(France) Clément Goncalves
(Germany) Andreas Hofer

| | 0–1 | 03:26 – Sharp (Bjerrum, Frank) |
| | 0–2 | 25:24 – Nielsen (Hansen) |
| | 0–3 | 40:50 – Nielsen (Mäkinen) |
| Domogała (Bepierszcz) – 58:14 | 1–3 |

8 min
Penalties
8 min
29
Shots
41

| 12 January 2020; 19:00 | Nottingham Panthers (United Kingdom) | 4–3 (0–2, 3–1, 1–0) | (Belarus) Neman Grodno | Frøs Arena; Attendance: 1,118 |

Game reference

Jackson Whistle
Goalies
Vitali Trus
Referees:
(Norway) Christian Persson
(Switzerland) Marc Wiegand
Linesmen:
(Denmark) Rene Jensen
(Austria) Elias Seewald

| | 0–1 | 01:31 – Kisly (Remezov) |
| | 0–2 | 15:10 – Malinovski (Kisly) (PP) |
| Hansen (Herr) – 26:38 | 1–2 |
| | 1–3 | 29:57 – Kisly (Remezov, Levsha) |
| Horvat (Fick) – 33:33 | 2–3 |
| Herr (Lachowicz, Hansen) – 37:01 | 3–3 |
| Golovkovs (Perlini) – 58:50 | 4–3 |

14 min
Penalties
6 min
29
Shots
27

== See also ==
- 2019–20 Champions Hockey League
