= Pepsi (disambiguation) =

Pepsi is a soft drink. The name may also refer to:

- PepsiCo, its manufacturer
  - Pepsi variations
  - Pepsi Arena (disambiguation), various other entertainment venues
  - Pepsi Center, in Denver, Colorado, U.S.
    - Pepsi Center / Elitch Gardens (RTD), the associated light rail station
    - Pepsi Centre, in Corner Brook, Newfoundland and Labrador, Canada
  - Pepsi Globe, its logo
  - Pepsi Orange Streak, a roller coaster sponsored by PepsiCo

== Geography ==
- Pepsi Cola Lake, a lake in South Carolina

== People ==
- Jacek Pszczoła (born 1967), Polish-American bridge player nicknamed "Pepsi"
- Pepsi Bethel (1918–2002), American dancer and choreographer
- Pepsi Tate (1965–2007), Welsh musician
- René Landry (1937–2016), Canadian politician nicknamed "Pepsi"
- Saint Pepsi, former stage name of American electronic music producer Ryan DeRobertis
- Marijuana Pepsi Vandyck (born 1972), American educator
- Pepsi Paloma (1966–1985), Filipino dancer
- Helen "Pepsi" DeMacque-Crockett (born 1958), British pop singer

== Art, entertainment, and media ==
=== Games ===
- Pepsi Invaders, a 1983 video game

=== Music ===
- Pepsi & Shirlie, an English pop duo
- Pepsi Beats of the Beautiful Game, a 2014 compilation album
- Pepsi Music Festival, an Argentine music festival
- "Jack Pepsi", a song by Tad

=== Radio ===
- Pepsi Chart, a UK radio program

=== Television ===
- Pepsi Live, an Australian television program
- Pepsi Power Hour, a Canadian television program
- The Pepsi-Cola Playhouse, an American television program

== Sports ==
- 1996 Pepsi Sharjah Cup, a cricket tournament
- 1997 Pepsi Independence Cup, a cricket tournament
- Pepsi 420, an automobile race
- Pepsi Championship, a golf tournament
- Pepsi Football Academy, a Nigerian football academy
- Pepsi Grand Slam, a tennis tournament
- Pepsi Little People's Golf Championships, a golf tournament
- Pepsi Max 400, an automobile race
- Pepsi NFL Rookie of the Week, an award
- Pepsi Ontario Junior Curling Championships, a curling tournament
- Juvecaserta Basket, an Italian basketball team also known as Pepsi Caserta
- Talk 'N Text Tropang Texters, a Philippine basketball team formerly known as the "Pepsi Hotshots" and the "Pepsi Mega Bottlers"
- Úrvalsdeild, an Icelandic football league also known as "Pepsi-deildin" ("the Pepsi League")

== See also ==
- Dispepsi, an album by the band Negativland
- Dyspepsia, an alternate name for indigestion
- PEPPSI, a chemical
- Pepsis, a genus of tarantula hawk wasps
- Pluto Energetic Particle Spectrometer Science Investigation (PEPSSI), a spectrometry sensor on the New Horizons Pluto space probe
- Pepsin, a digestive enzyme
