= 2010 World Junior Ice Hockey Championships – Division II =

2010 IIHF U20 World Championship Division II
Tournament details
- Host countries: Hungary; Estonia
- Venues: 2 (in 2 host cities)
- Dates: 13–19 December 2009; 12–18 December 2009
- Teams: 12

The 2010 World Junior Ice Hockey Championship Division II was a pair of international ice hockey tournaments organized by the International Ice Hockey Federation. Division II represents the third level of the 2010 World Junior Ice Hockey Championships.

== Group A ==
The Group A tournament was played in Debrecen, Hungary, from 13 to 19 December 2009.

=== Participating teams ===
Team	Qualification
Hungary	Hosts; placed 6th in Division I (Group B) last year and were relegated.
Great Britain	Placed 2nd in Division II (Group A) last year.
South Korea	Placed 3rd in Division II (Group A) last year.
Mexico	Placed 4th in Division II (Group B) last year.
Spain	Placed 5th in Division II (Group B) last year.
China	Placed 6th in Division II (Group B) last year.

=== Final standings ===
Pos	Team	Pld	W	OTW	OTL	L	GF	GA	GD	Pts	Promotion or relegation
1	Great Britain	5	3	2	0	0	51	11	+40	13	Promoted to the 2011 Division I
2	Hungary (H)	5	4	0	1	0	66	8	+58	13	
3	Spain	5	3	0	1	1	30	17	+13	10	
4	South Korea	5	2	0	0	3	20	18	+2	6	
5	China	5	1	0	0	4	8	48	−40	3	
6	Mexico	5	0	0	0	5	4	77	−73	0	Relegated to the 2011 Division III

Source: IIHF
(H) Host

=== Match results ===
All times are local (Central European Time – UTC+1).

13 December 2009; 13:00	Great Britain	8–0 (2–0, 3–0, 3–0)	China	Főnix Hall, Debrecen; Attendance: 102

Game reference

Ben Bowns
Thomas Murdy
Goalies
Kewei Zhang
Mingyuan Wu
Referee:
(Slovenia) Viki Trilar
Linesmen:
(Serbia) Tibor Fazekas
(Belgium) Frederic Monnaie

Bowie (Squires, Duggan) – 03:13	1–0
Farmer – 16:01	2–0
Davies – 24:07	3–0
Hayes – 36:20	4–0
Farmer (PP) – 39:20	5–0
Farmer – 45:39	6–0
Farmer – 53:40	7–0
Salam – 58:46	8–0

16 min
Penalties
18 min
51
Shots
6

13 December 2009; 16:30	South Korea	12–0 (6–0, 3–0, 3–0)	Mexico	Főnix Hall, Debrecen; Attendance: 163

Game reference

Hyun Ho Hwang
Jung Hwan Park
Goalies
Diego Cantón
Agustin Grimaldi
Referee:
(Italy) Claudio Pianezze
Linesmen:
(Hungary) Attila Nagy
(Hungary) Marton Nemeth

Cho H.G. (Lee Y.J., Cho J.H.) – 00:17	1–0
Lee C.H. (Lee M.H., Kim H.R.) – 02:32	2–0
Yoon (Lee Y.J., Cho H.G.) – 09:02	3–0
Lee M.H. (SH) – 12:29	4–0
Yoon (Cho H.G.) (SH) – 15:05	5–0
Shin H.Y. (Lee M.W., Lee C.H.) (PP) – 18:58	6–0
Chung (Bang) – 22:55	7–0
Yoon (PP) (Lee Y.J., Choi) – 27:51	8–0
Chung (Bang, Yong) (PP) – 33:21	9–0
Lee Y.J. (Cho H.G.) – 46:14	10–0
Yoon (Choi Y.H., Cho) – 53:07	11–0
Lee C.H. (Shin H.Y.) – 58:34	12–0

8 min
Penalties
12 min
56
Shots
6

13 December 2009; 20:00	Hungary	8–2 (5–0, 2–1, 1–1)	Spain	Főnix Hall, Debrecen; Attendance: 565

Game reference
Attila Nemeth (SH1) 04:26; Balázs Somogyi (PP1) 06:23; Levente Szilagyi 10:52; Istvan Bartalis (PP1) 14:16; Benjámin Nemes 17:03; Balázs Somogyi 22:52; Adrian Toth 26:55; Attila Pavuk 59:57 / Goals / 21:05 Carlos Quevedo; 44:10 (PP1) Juan Munoz

14 December 2009; 13:00	Great Britain	7–1 (1–1, 4–0, 2–0)	South Korea	Főnix Hall, Debrecen; Attendance: 135

Game reference
Robert Lachowicz 16:22; Mathew Davies (PP1) 29:36; Robert Farmer (PP1) 34:17; Iain Bowie 35:45; Mathew Davies (PP1) 38:34; Nathan Salam 52:58; Mathew Davies 53:57 / Goals / 07:52 (PP1) Choi Yong-ho

14 December 2009; 16:30	Spain	12–1 (2–0, 8–1, 2–0)	China	Főnix Hall, Debrecen; Attendance: 125

Game reference
Adrian Betran 00:23; Juan Munoz 01:55 (PP1); Juan Munoz (PP1) 20:40; Alejandro Pedraz (PP2) 22:02; Alejandro Hernandez (PP1) 25:06; Oriol Boronat 27:14; Javier Garcia-Arias (PP1) 27:52; Oriol Boronat 32:31; Alejandro Hernandez (SH1) 36:29; Javier Garcia-Arias 38:24; Juan Munoz 40:51; Juan Munoz (PP2) 58:00 / Goals / 31:45 (SH1) He Yin

14 December 2009; 20:00	Hungary	28–0 (10–0, 11–0, 7–0)	Mexico	Főnix Hall, Debrecen; Attendance: 590

Game reference
Attila Orbán 00:39; Richard Hardi 03:37; Attila Pavuk 06:41; Benjámin Nemes 07:08; Istvan Bartalis 08:04; Attila Orbán 15:23; Tamás Virág 16:29; Attila Nemeth 17:15; Adrian Toth 18:54; Tamás Virág 19:19; Istvan Bartalis 20:36; Dániel Kiss 21:05; Dániel Kiss 22:30; Balázs Somogyi 27:48; Roland Hajos 28:01; Tamás Virág 28:53; Attila Orbán 34:37; Balázs Somogyi 36:17; Tamás Virág 37:50; Attila Nemeth 37:56; Balázs Somogyi 44:11; Benjámin Nemes 46:07; Bence Zalavari 47:54; Tamás Virág 53:03; Balázs Somogyi 55:06; Levente Szilagyi (PP1) 57:06; Benjámin Nemes 57:51 / Goals

16 December 2009; 13:00	China	6–3 (2–0, 2–2, 2–1)	Mexico	Főnix Hall, Debrecen; Attendance: 115

Game reference
He Yin 06:35; Sun Peng 12:02; Sun Peng 24:36; Wang Yan 35:23; Chen Ji 42:52; Qu Xiaoyu 43:33 / Goals / 26:59 (PP1) Aaron Duff; 35:03 Alan Smithers; 58:49 Aaron Duff

16 December 2009; 16:30	Great Britain	6–5 OT (2–2, 1–2, 2–1) (1–0)	Spain	Főnix Hall, Debrecen; Attendance: 105

Game reference
Stephen Lee (PP1) 02:40; Mathew Davies 13:29; Thomas Duggan 23:35; Iain Bowie 41:34; Thomas Norton 46:01; Thomas Duggan (PP1)(OT) 62:08 / Goals / 16:04 (PP1) Oscar Vazquez; 18:09 (PP1) Juan Munoz; 31:25 (PP2) Juan Munoz; 36:43 (PP1) Oscar Vazquez; 48:35 Juan Munoz

16 December 2009; 20:00	South Korea	0–6 (0–3, 0–2, 0–1)	Hungary	Főnix Hall, Debrecen; Attendance: 725

Game reference
Goals / 00:37 Balázs Somogyi; 09:16 (PP1) Benjámin Nemes; 09:36 Attila Pavuk; 26:55 Patrik Popovics; 38:07 Istvan Bartalis; 45:11 (SH1) Balázs Somogyi

18 December 2009; 13:00	Spain	5–2 (2–0, 1–0, 2–2)	South Korea	Főnix Hall, Debrecen; Attendance: 105

Game reference
Adrian Betran 09:47; Pol Gonzales 10:39; Alejandro Pedraz 31:46; Juan Munoz 44:09; Carlos Quevedo 59:34 / Goals / 55:13 (PP1) Yoon Ji-man; 55:36 Min Kwon-ki

18 December 2009; 16:30	Mexico	1–25 (0–9, 0–15, 1–1)	Great Britain	Főnix Hall, Debrecen

Game reference
49:46 Christian Smithers / Goals / 00:47 Mathew Davies; 03:22 Robert Farmer; 05:03 Sam Oakford; 05:42 Robert Lachowicz; 11:34 Matthew Heywood; 13:03 Robert Farmer; 13:21 Thomas Squires; 16:32 Robert Lachowicz; 19:06 Nathan Salam; 22:04 Ben Davies; 22:56 Iain Bowie; 23:30 Mathew Davies; 23:38 Sam Bullas; 24:34 Robert Lachowicz; 27:22 (PP1) Ben Davies; 28:23 Thomas Squires; 29:21 Robert Lachowicz; 30:03 Ben Davies; 32:39 Ciaran Long; 33:54 Jamie Hayes; 35:03 Iain Bowie; 35:23 Iain Bowie; 38:38 Matthew Heywood; 38:51 Nathan Salam; 56:04 Robert Farmer

18 December 2009; 20:00	China	1–20 (1–6, 0–7, 0–7)	Hungary	Főnix Hall, Debrecen; Attendance: 320

Game reference
07:54 Li Ning / Goals / 01:06 Balasz Somogyi; 03:28 (PP1) Balasz Somogyi; 06:28 Dániel Kiss; 10:26 (PP1) Istvan Bartalis; 14:09 David Kiss; 16:37 Patrik Popovics; 24:23 (PP1) Balasz Somogyi; 27:38 (PP1) Balasz Somogyi; 28:39 Patrik Popovics; 33:26 Levente Szilagyi; 36:32 (PP1) Adrian Toth; 37:52 (PP2) Richard Hardi; 39:12 (PP1) David Kiss; 42:25 Adrian Toth; 43:43 Attila Nemeth; 47:15 (PP1) Attila Pavuk; 49:48 Roland Hajos; 54:52 (PP1) Arnold Varga; 56:50 Adrian Toth; 58:56 Balasz Somogyi

19 December 2009; 13:00	Mexico	0–6 (0–2, 0–2, 0–2)	Spain	Főnix Hall, Debrecen; Attendance: 105

Game reference
Goals / 15:03 Oscar Vazquez; 16:21 Juan Munoz; 28:37 Oscar Vazquez; 36:43 Oriol Boronat; 48:06 Pol Gonzalez; 59:37 (PP1) Juan Munoz

19 December 2009; 16:30	Hungary	4–5 GWS (1–2, 2–2, 1–0) (0–0, 0–1)	Great Britain	Főnix Hall, Debrecen; Attendance: 1,645

Game reference
Patrik Popovics 01:17; Patrik Popovics 23:34; Balasz Somogyi 26:56; Benjámin Nemes 46:36 / Goals / 06:46 Thomas Duggan; 18:06 Ben Davies; 33:59 Iain Bowie; 37:39 Iain Bowie; 65:00 (GWG) Ciaran Long

19 December 2009; 20:00	South Korea	5–0 (2–0, 1–0, 2–0)	China	Főnix Hall, Debrecen; Attendance: 105

Game reference
Lee Min-woo 01:15; Lee Chan-hwi 04:16; Yoon Ji-man (PP1) 31:05; Shin Hyung-yun 53:13; Chung Yeon-jun 55:23 / Goals

== Group B ==
The Group B tournament was played in Narva, Estonia, from 12 to 18 December 2009.

=== Participating teams ===
Team	Qualification
Estonia	Hosts; placed 6th in Division I (Group A) last year and were relegated.
Lithuania	Placed 2nd in Division II (Group B) last year.
Netherlands	Placed 3rd in Division II (Group B) last year.
Belgium	Placed 4th in Division II (Group A) last year.
Serbia	Placed 5th in Division II (Group A) last year.
Romania	Placed 6th in Division II (Group A) last year.

=== Final standings ===
Pos	Team	Pld	W	OTW	OTL	L	GF	GA	GD	Pts	Promotion or relegation
1	Lithuania	5	5	0	0	0	34	12	+22	15	Promoted to the 2011 Division I
2	Netherlands	5	4	0	0	1	26	19	+7	12	
3	Romania	5	2	1	0	2	21	21	0	8	
4	Belgium	5	1	1	0	3	15	24	−9	5	
5	Estonia (H)	5	0	0	3	2	15	24	−9	3	
6	Serbia	5	0	1	0	4	17	28	−11	2	Relegated to the 2011 Division III

Source: IIHF
(H) Host

=== Match results ===
All times are local (Eastern European Time – UTC+2).

12 December 2009; 13:00	Romania	5–3 (0–1, 1–2, 4–0)	Belgium	Kreenholm Ice Hall, Narva

Game reference

12 December 2009; 16:30	Lithuania	5–1 (0–1, 3–0, 2–0)	Serbia	Kreenholm Ice Hall, Narva

Game reference

12 December 2009; 20:00	Netherlands	5–3 (2–2, 2–0, 1–1)	Estonia	Kreenholm Ice Hall, Narva

Game reference

13 December 2009; 13:00	Serbia	3–5 (0–3, 0–1, 3–1)	Romania	Kreenholm Ice Hall, Narva

Game reference

13 December 2009; 16:30	Lithuania	6–1 (2–0, 3–1, 1–0)	Netherlands	Kreenholm Ice Hall, Narva

Game reference

13 December 2009; 20:00	Estonia	4–5 GWS (1–2, 2–1, 1–1) (0–0, 0–1)	Belgium	Kreenholm Ice Hall, Narva

Game reference

15 December 2009; 13:00	Lithuania	9–5 (4–2, 2–0, 3–3)	Romania	Kreenholm Ice Hall, Narva

Game reference

15 December 2009; 16:30	Netherlands	5–1 (2–1, 2–0, 1–0)	Belgium	Kreenholm Ice Hall, Narva

Game reference

15 December 2009; 20:00	Estonia	4–5 GWS (1–1, 1–1, 2–2) (0–0, 0–1)	Serbia	Kreenholm Ice Hall, Narva

Game reference

16 December 2009; 13:00	Serbia	5–10 (0–1, 3–4, 2–5)	Netherlands	Kreenholm Ice Hall, Narva

Game reference

16 December 2009; 16:30	Belgium	2–7 (1–1, 1–4, 0–2)	Lithuania	Kreenholm Ice Hall, Narva

Game reference

16 December 2009; 20:00	Romania	2–1 GWS (1–0, 0–1, 0–0) (0–0, 1–0)	Estonia	Kreenholm Ice Hall, Narva

Game reference

18 December 2009; 13:00	Belgium	4–3 (1–1, 1–2, 2–0)	Serbia	Kreenholm Ice Hall, Narva

Game reference

18 December 2009; 16:30	Netherlands	5–4 (3–2, 1–0, 1–2)	Romania	Kreenholm Ice Hall, Narva

Game reference

18 December 2009; 20:00	Estonia	3–7 (0–3, 2–3, 1–1)	Lithuania	Kreenholm Ice Hall, Narva

Game reference

== See also ==
- 2010 World Junior Ice Hockey Championships
- 2010 World Junior Ice Hockey Championships – Division I
- 2010 World Junior Ice Hockey Championships – Division III
- 2010 World Junior Ice Hockey Championships rosters
