= 2007–08 USHL season =

2007-08 USHL season
- League: United States Hockey League
- Sport: Ice hockey
- Duration: Regular season October 2007 – April 2008; Playoffs; April – May 2008
- Games: 60
- Teams: 12

Draft
- Top draft pick: Will Weber
- Picked by: Chicago Steel

Regular season
- Anderson Cup: Omaha Lancers
- Season MVP: Jason Gregoire (Lincoln Stars)
- Top scorer: Jack Connolly (Sioux Falls Stampede) & John Kemp (Indiana Ice)

Clark Cup Playoffs
- Finals champions: Omaha Lancers
- Runners-up: Waterloo Black Hawks
- Finals MVP: Drew Palmisano (Lancers)

USHL seasons
- 2006–07 2008–09

The 2007–08 USHL season is the 29th season of the United States Hockey League as an all-junior league. The regular season began on October 5, 2007, and concluded on April 5, 2008 with the regular season champion winning the Anderson Cup. This was the final season of operation for the Ohio Junior Blue Jackets after failing to find a suitable relocation arrangement.

The Clark Cup playoffs featured the top four teams from each division competing for the league title.

== Regular season ==
Final Standings
Note: GP = Games played; W = Wins; L = Losses; OTL = Overtime losses; SL = Shootout losses; GF = Goals for; GA = Goals against; PTS = Points; x = clinched playoff berth; y = clinched division title; z = clinched league title

=== East Division ===
Team	GP	W	L	OTL	PTS	GF	GA
yIndiana Ice	60	39	15	6	84	223	193
xWaterloo Black Hawks	60	38	17	5	81	183	151
xCedar Rapids RoughRiders	60	33	22	5	71	200	156
xChicago Steel	60	32	22	6	70	218	199
Ohio Junior Blue Jackets	60	26	28	6	58	182	215
Green Bay Gamblers	60	13	41	6	32	130	224

=== West Division ===
Team	GP	W	L	OTL	PTS	GF	GA
zOmaha Lancers	60	43	12	5	91	224	139
xSioux Falls Stampede	60	35	19	6	76	199	175
xLincoln Stars	60	31	22	7	69	186	163
xSioux City Musketeers	60	32	25	4	67	194	185
Tri-City Storm	60	24	34	2	50	153	213
Des Moines Buccaneers	60	14	40	6	34	134	213

== Clark Cup Playoffs ==
Quarter-finals
1	Indiana	3	7	1	0	–
4	Chicago	4	2	3	5	–
East Division
2	Waterloo	4**	3	5	–	–
3	Cedar Rapids	3	0	2	–	–
1	Omaha	3	2	5*	3	–
4	Sioux City	0	6	4	2	–
West Division
2	Sioux Falls	2	3	3	–	–
3	Lincoln	3**	5	7	–	–

Semi-finals
4	Chicago	1	1	2	–	–
2	Waterloo	4	5	3*	–	–
1	Omaha	5	3	3	3	5
3	Lincoln	0	2	6	4*	4

Clark Cup Championship
E	Waterloo	4*	0	3	0	3
W	Omaha	3	2	1	2	4*

Note: * denotes overtime period(s)

== Quarterfinals ==
=== Eastern Division ===
==== (E1) Indiana Ice vs. (E4) Chicago Steel ====
April 10	Indiana Ice	3 – 4	Chicago Steel	Pepsi Coliseum
17:56 - pp - Jake Skjodt (1)		First period	Tim Buttery (1) - pp - 17:45
13:21 - John Carlson (1)		Second period	Luca Cunti (1) - 15:23
2:15 - Will MacDonald (1)		Third period	Aaron Schmit (1) - 3:08; Eric Alexander (1) - 17:30
Scott Darling (27 saves / 31 shots)		Goalie stats	Rob Madore (35 saves / 38 shots)

April 12	Indiana Ice	7 – 2	Chicago Steel	Pepsi Coliseum
15:04 - pp - Ben Blood (1)		First period	Andrew Miller (1) - 10:49; Brian O'Neill (1) - pp - 19:18
3:28 - Jake Skjodt (2); 7:08 - pp - Paul Carey (1); 9:31 - Locke Jillson (1); 19:48 - Robert Martini (1)		Second period	No scoring
6:23 - pp - Nick Bailen (1); 7:43 - Brent Gwidt (1)		Third period	No scoring
Scott Darling (25 saves / 27 shots)		Goalie stats	Rob Madore (31 saves / 37 shots); Nick Pisellini (7 saves / 8 shots)

April 15	Chicago Steel	3 – 1	Indiana Ice	Edge Ice Arena
0:22 - Drew LeBlanc (1)		First period	Ron Cramer (1) - 6:49
10:34 - Luca Cunti (2)		Second period	No scoring
16:49 - ps - Eric Alexander (2)		Third period	No scoring
Rob Madore (41 saves / 42 shots)		Goalie stats	Matthew Hoyle (37 saves / 40 shots)

April 18	Chicago Steel	5 – 0	Indiana Ice	Edge Ice Arena
No scoring		First period	No scoring
11:01 - sh - Brian O'Neill (2); 18:44 - pp - Simon Olsson (1)		Second period	No scoring
14:22 - pp - Andrew Miller (2); 19:06 - pp - Eric Alexander (3); 19:51 - pp - Corey Chakeen (1)		Third period	No scoring
Rob Madore (37 saves / 37 shots)		Goalie stats	Scott Darling (36 saves / 41 shots)

Chicago wins series 3 – 1

==== (E2) Waterloo Black Hawks vs. (E3) Cedar Rapids RoughRiders ====
April 11	Waterloo Black Hawks	4 – 3	2OT	Cedar Rapids RoughRiders	Young Arena
13:22 - pp - Billy Maday (1)		First period		No scoring
0:28 - pp - Chad Billins (1); 7:51 - pp - Nick Larson (1)		Second period		Ian Slater (1) - 19:09
No scoring		Third period		Mike Seidel (1) - 1:24; Robin Bergman (1) - pp - 17:18
17:24 - Craig Smith (1)		Second overtime period		No scoring
Matt Di Girolamo (30 saves / 33 shots)		Goalie stats		Brady Hjelle (42 saves / 46 shots)

April 12	Waterloo Black Hawks	3 – 0	Cedar Rapids RoughRiders	Young Arena
15:24 - pp - Brett Beebe (1)		First period	No scoring
No scoring		Second period	No scoring
11:44 - pp - Nick Larson (2); 19:26 - en - Jan-Mikael Juutilainen (1)		Third period	No scoring
Matt Di Girolamo (21 saves / 21 shots)		Goalie stats	Brady Hjelle (29 saves / 31 shots)

April 16	Cedar Rapids RoughRiders	2 – 5	Waterloo Black Hawks	Cedar Rapids Ice Arena
1:45 - pp - Casey Wellman (1)		First period	Chad Billins (2) - pp - 8:02; Siim Liivik (1) - 14:59
0:06 - sh - David Boehm (1)		Second period	Paul Weisgarber (1) - 9:53
No scoring		Third period	Jan-Mikael Juutilainen (2) - 7:50; Billy Maday (2) - 12:52
Brady Hjelle (34 saves / 39 shots)		Goalie stats	Matt Di Girolamo (20 saves / 22 shots)

Waterloo wins series 3 – 0

=== Western Division ===
==== (W1) Omaha Lancers vs. (W4) Sioux City Musketeers ====
April 8	Omaha Lancers	3 – 0	Sioux City Musketeers	Omaha Civic Auditorium
16:32 - Seth Soley (1)		First period	No scoring
12:35 - Ben Arnt (1)		Second period	No scoring
3:40 - Aaron Lewadniuk (1)		Third period	No scoring
Drew Palmisano (24 saves / 24 shots)		Goalie stats	Josh Robinson (35 saves / 38 shots)

April 11	Sioux City Musketeers	6 – 2	Omaha Lancers	Tyson Events Center
Matt Crandell (1) - 11:57; Travis Oleksuk (1) - 13:26		First period	13:45 - Chris Connolly (1)
Joe Miller (1) - 19:18		Second period	No scoring
Steve Quailer (1) - 1:49; Ben Kinne (1) - pp - 9:32; Ben Kinne (2) - pp - 18:13		Third period	19:07 - Seth Soley (2)
Josh Robinson (34 saves / 36 shots)		Goalie stats	Drew Palmisano (18 saves / 22 shots); Shane Madolora (8 saves / 10 shots)

April 12	Sioux City Musketeers	4 – 5	OT	Omaha Lancers	Tyson Events Center
10:13 - pp - Spencer Heichman (1)		First period		Keir Ross (1) - 4:09
5:09 - Mitch Bruijsten (1)		Second period		Travis Novak (1) - 0:53; Andrew Conboy (1) - pp - 11:50
10:06 - Joe Miller (2); 18:11 - Joe Miller (3)		Third period		Joe Sova (1) - 4:56
No scoring		First overtime period		Andrew Conboy (2) - 18:45
Josh Robinson (54 saves / 59 shots)		Goalie stats		Drew Palmisano (30 saves / 34 shots)

April 17	Omaha Lancers	3 – 2	Sioux City Musketeers	Omaha Civic Auditorium
No scoring		First period	3:24 - Joe Miller (4)
No scoring		Second period	5:15 - pp - Stéphane Da Costa (1)
Matt White (1) - 2:38; Aaron Lewadniuk (2) - 3:46; Andrew Conboy (3) - 11:07		Third period	No scoring
Drew Palmisano (41 saves / 43 shots)		Goalie stats	Josh Robinson (28 saves / 31 shots)

Omaha wins series 3 – 1

==== (W2) Sioux Falls Stampede vs. (W3) Lincoln Stars ====
April 9	Sioux Falls Stampede	2 – 3	2OT	Lincoln Stars	Sioux Falls Arena
No scoring		First period		Jared Festler (1) - 16:57
0:36 - Terry Broadhurst (1)		Second period		No scoring
3:41 - Robbie Vrolyk (1)		Third period		Danny Baco (1) - 8:41
No scoring		Second overtime period		Jason Gregoire (1) - 1:16
Eric Hartzell (57 saves / 60 shots)		Goalie stats		David Reekie (43 saves / 45 shots)

April 11	Sioux Falls Stampede	3 – 5	Lincoln Stars	Sioux Falls Arena

April 12	Lincoln Stars	7 – 3	Sioux Falls Stampede	Ice Box

Lincoln wins series 3 – 0

== Semifinals ==
=== Eastern Division ===
==== (E2) Waterloo Black Hawks vs. (E4) Chicago Steel ====
April 23	Waterloo Black Hawks	4 – 1	Chicago Steel	Young Arena

April 25	Waterloo Black Hawks	5 – 1	Chicago Steel	Young Arena

April 27	Chicago Steel	2 – 3	OT	Waterloo Black Hawks	Edge Ice Arena

Waterloo win series 3 – 0

=== Western Division ===
==== (W1) Omaha Lancers vs. (W3) Lincoln Stars ====
April 22	Omaha Lancers	5 – 0	Lincoln Stars	Omaha Civic Auditorium

April 25	Lincoln Stars	2 – 3	Omaha Lancers	Ice Box

April 26	Omaha Lancers	3 – 6	Lincoln Stars	Omaha Civic Auditorium

April 29	Lincoln Stars	4 – 3	OT	Omaha Lancers	Ice Box

April 30	Omaha Lancers	5 – 4	Lincoln Stars	Omaha Civic Auditorium

Omaha wins series 3 – 2

== Clark Cup Finals ==
=== (E1) Omaha Lancers vs. (W2) Waterloo Black Hawks ===
May 4	Omaha Lancers	3 – 4	OT	Waterloo Black Hawks	Omaha Civic Auditorium
3:54 - Andrew Conboy (8)		First period		No scoring
12:19 - Dakota Eveland (2)		Second period		Eddie Olczyk (1) - 8:40; Paul Weisgarber (3) - 9:06
5:06 - Joe Diamond (4)		Third period		Chad Billins (3) - pp - 0:48
No scoring		First overtime period		Brett Olson (1) - pp - 11:02
Drew Palmisano (28 saves / 32 shots)		Goalie stats		Matt Di Girolamo (27 saves / 30 shots)

May 5	Omaha Lancers	2 – 0	Waterloo Black Hawks	Omaha Civic Auditorium
4:58 - Jake Hauswirth (1); 13:35 - Matt White (2)		First period	No scoring
No scoring		Second period	No scoring
No scoring		Third period	No scoring
Drew Palmisano (28 saves / 28 shots)		Goalie stats	Matt Di Girolamo (29 saves / 31 shots)

May 7	Waterloo Black Hawks	3 – 1	Omaha Lancers	Young Arena

May 9	Waterloo Black Hawks	0 – 2	Omaha Lancers	Young Arena

May 10	Omaha Lancers	4 – 3	OT	Waterloo Black Hawks	Omaha Civic Auditorium

Omaha wins series 3 – 2

== Players ==
=== Scoring Leaders ===
	Player	Team	GP	G	A	Pts	+/-	PIM
1	Jack Connolly	Sioux Falls Stampede	58	26	46	72	+18	30
	John Kemp	Indiana Ice	58	13	59	72	0	20
3	Gregory Squires	Indiana Ice	58	24	46	70	+13	50
4	Jason Gregoire	Lincoln Stars	54	37	32	69	+18	41
5	Paul Carey	Indiana Ice	60	34	32	66	+2	32
6	Brian O'Neill	Chicago Steel	60	23	38	61	+29	40
7	Barry Almeida	Omaha Lancers	56	22	38	60	+11	22
8	Billy Maday	Waterloo Black Hawks	60	24	35	59	+5	72
9	Jake Hansen	Sioux Falls Stampede	60	31	27	58	+16	57
	Ryan Kretzer	Lincoln Stars	60	22	36	58	0	47

=== Leading Goaltenders ===
	Player	Team	GP	MIN	W	L	OTL	SO	GA	GAA	SV	SV%
1	David Reekie	Lincoln Stars	38	2235	23	10	4	6	75	2.01	1086	.935
2	Drew Palmisano	Omaha Lancers	45	2579	32	8	3	3	87	2.02	1035	.922
3	Joe Howe	Waterloo Black Hawks	22	1215	13	5	1	2	43	2.12	462	.915
4	Matthew DiGirolamo	Waterloo Black Hawks	42	2437	25	12	4	1	98	2.41	879	.900
5	Brady Hjelle	Cedar Rapids RoughRiders	41	2380	22	15	4	3	99	2.50	1158	.921

== Awards ==
- Coach of the Year: Steve Poapst Chicago Steel
- Curt Hammer Award: Joey Miller Sioux City Musketeers
- Defenseman of the Year: Blake Kessel Waterloo Black Hawks
- Executive of the Year: Jim Kronschnabel Sioux City Musketeers
- Forward of the Year: Jason Gregoire Lincoln Stars
- General Manager of the Year: Mike Hastings Omaha Lancers
- Goaltender of the Year: David Reekie Lincoln Stars
- Organization of the Year: Indiana Ice
- Player of the Year: Jason Gregoire Lincoln Stars
- Rookie of the Year: Jack Connolly Sioux Falls Stampede
- Scholar-Athlete of the Year: Matt Farris Sioux Falls Stampede

=== First Team All-Stars ===
- David Reekie (Goalie) Lincoln Stars
- Blake Kessel (Defense) Waterloo Black Hawks
- Matt Bartkowski (Defense) Lincoln Stars
- Jack Connolly (Forward) Sioux Falls Stampede
- Jason Gregoire (Forward) Lincoln Stars
- Barry Almeida (Forward) Omaha Lancers

=== Second Team All-Stars ===
- Drew Palmisano (Goalie) Omaha Lancers
- John Carlson (Defense) Indiana Ice
- Paul Carey (Defense) Indiana Ice
- John Kemp (Forward) Indiana Ice
- Eric Springer (Forward) Sioux Falls Stampede
- Jake Hansen (Forward) Sioux Falls Stampede
