= 2009 World Junior Ice Hockey Championships – Division I =

2009 IIHF U20 World Championship Division I
Tournament details
- Host countries: Switzerland; Denmark
- Venue(s): 2 (in 2 host cities)
- Dates: 14–20 December 2008; 15–21 December 2008
- Teams: 12

The 2009 World Junior Ice Hockey Championship Division I was a pair of international ice hockey tournaments organized by the International Ice Hockey Federation. Division I represents the second level of the 2009 World Junior Ice Hockey Championships. The winners of each group were promoted to the Top Division for the 2010 IIHF World U20 Championship, while the last-placed teams in each group were relegated to the 2010 Division II.

== Group A ==
The Group A tournament was played in Herisau, Switzerland, from 14 to 20 December 2008.

=== Participating teams ===
Team	Qualification
Switzerland	Hosts; placed 9th in Top Division last year and were relegated.
Belarus	Placed 2nd in Division I (Group B) last year.
Slovenia	Placed 3rd in Division I (Group B) last year.
Poland	Placed 4th in Division I (Group A) last year.
France	Placed 5th in Division I (Group B) last year.
Estonia	Placed 1st in Division II (Group B) last year and were promoted.

=== Final standings ===
Pos	Team	Pld	W	OTW	OTL	L	GF	GA	GD	Pts	Promotion or relegation
1	Switzerland (H)	5	5	0	0	0	31	7	+24	15	Promoted to the 2010 Top Division
2	Belarus	5	4	0	0	1	39	7	+32	12	
3	France	5	3	0	0	2	33	17	+16	9	
4	Slovenia	5	2	0	0	3	31	17	+14	6	
5	Poland	5	1	0	0	4	7	23	−16	3	
6	Estonia	5	0	0	0	5	6	76	−70	0	Relegated to the 2010 Division II

Source: IIHF
(H) Host

=== Match results ===
All times are local (Central European Time – UTC+1).

14 December 2008; 13:00	France	2–1 (1–0, 1–0, 0–1)	Slovenia	Sportzentrum Herisau, Herisau

Game reference

14 December 2008; 16:30	Estonia	1–12 (0–7, 1–2, 0–3)	Switzerland	Sportzentrum Herisau, Herisau

Game reference

14 December 2008; 20:00	Poland	0–4 (0–1, 0–1, 0–2)	Belarus	Sportzentrum Herisau, Herisau

Game reference

15 December 2008; 16:30	Slovenia	22–2 (9–1, 9–1, 4–0)	Estonia	Sportzentrum Herisau, Herisau

Game reference

15 December 2008; 20:00	Switzerland	5–1 (3–1, 0–0, 2–0)	Poland	Sportzentrum Herisau, Herisau

Game reference

16 December 2008; 16:30	Belarus	8–2 (1–1, 3–0, 4–1)	France	Sportzentrum Herisau, Herisau

Game reference

17 December 2008; 13:00	Estonia	2–4 (0–0, 0–2, 2–2)	Poland	Sportzentrum Herisau, Herisau

Game reference

17 December 2008; 16:30	Belarus	7–2 (0–0, 4–1, 3–1)	Slovenia	Sportzentrum Herisau, Herisau

Game reference

17 December 2008; 20:00	Switzerland	6–2 (3–1, 1–1, 2–0)	France	Sportzentrum Herisau, Herisau

Game reference

18 December 2008; 20:00	Slovenia	2–6 (1–2, 1–1, 0–3)	Switzerland	Sportzentrum Herisau, Herisau

Game reference

19 December 2008; 16:30	Poland	2–8 (0–3, 0–4, 2–1)	France	Sportzentrum Herisau, Herisau

Game reference

19 December 2008; 20:00	Belarus	19–1 (5–1, 6–0, 8–0)	Estonia	Sportzentrum Herisau, Herisau

Game reference

20 December 2008; 13:00	Slovenia	4–0 (2–0, 0–0, 2–0)	Poland	Sportzentrum Herisau, Herisau

Game reference

20 December 2008; 16:30	France	19–0 (5–0, 8–0, 6–0)	Estonia	Sportzentrum Herisau, Herisau

Game reference

20 December 2008; 20:00	Switzerland	2–1 (1–1, 0–0, 1–0)	Belarus	Sportzentrum Herisau, Herisau

Game reference

== Group B ==
The Group B tournament was played in Aalborg, Denmark, from 15 to 21 December 2008.

=== Participating teams ===
Team	Qualification
Denmark	Hosts; placed 10th in Top Division last year and were relegated.
Austria	Placed 2nd in Division I (Group A) last year.
Norway	Placed 3rd in Division I (Group A) last year.
Hungary	Placed 4th in Division I (Group B) last year.
Ukraine	Placed 5th in Division I (Group A) last year.
Italy	Placed 1st in Division II (Group A) last year and were promoted.

=== Final standings ===
Pos	Team	Pld	W	OTW	OTL	L	GF	GA	GD	Pts	Promotion or relegation
1	Austria	5	4	0	1	0	28	9	+19	13	Promoted to the 2010 Top Division
2	Denmark (H)	5	4	0	0	1	16	13	+3	12	
3	Norway	5	2	1	0	2	14	17	−3	8	
4	Italy	5	2	1	0	2	14	10	+4	8	
5	Ukraine	5	1	0	0	4	10	16	−6	3	
6	Hungary	5	0	0	1	4	11	28	−17	1	Relegated to the 2010 Division II

Source: IIHF
(H) Host

=== Match results ===
All times are local (Central European Time – UTC+1).

15 December 2008; 13:15	Ukraine	2–4 (0–1, 1–2, 1–1)	Norway	Aalborg Arena, Aalborg

Game reference

15 December 2008; 16:45	Hungary	2–6 (2–1, 0–5, 0–0)	Austria	Aalborg Arena, Aalborg

Game reference

15 December 2008; 20:15	Italy	1–2 (0–0, 0–1, 1–1)	Denmark	Aalborg Arena, Aalborg

Game reference

16 December 2008; 13:15	Austria	6–2 (1–0, 2–2, 3–0)	Ukraine	Aalborg Arena, Aalborg

Game reference

16 December 2008; 16:45	Norway	4–1 (1–0, 2–0, 1–1)	Italy	Aalborg Arena, Aalborg

Game reference

16 December 2008; 20:15	Denmark	5–2 (2–0, 1–1, 2–1)	Hungary	Aalborg Arena, Aalborg

Game reference

18 December 2008; 13:15	Italy	8–2 (2–1, 3–0, 3–1)	Hungary	Aalborg Arena, Aalborg

Game reference

18 December 2008; 16:45	Austria	7–0 (2–0, 2–0, 3–0)	Norway	Aalborg Arena, Aalborg

Game reference

18 December 2008; 20:15	Denmark	2–0 (0–0, 1–0, 1–0)	Ukraine	Aalborg Arena, Aalborg

Game reference

19 December 2008; 13:15	Austria	1–2 OT (0–0, 0–1, 1–0); OT: 0–1	Italy	Aalborg Arena, Aalborg

Game reference

19 December 2008; 16:45	Hungary	2–5 (0–1, 2–1, 0–3)	Ukraine	Aalborg Arena, Aalborg

Game reference

19 December 2008; 20:15	Norway	2–4 (1–3, 0–0, 1–1)	Denmark	Aalborg Arena, Aalborg

Game reference

21 December 2008; 13:15	Norway	4–3 GWS (1–1, 1–2, 1–0); OT: 0–0, GWS: 1–0	Hungary	Aalborg Arena, Aalborg

Game reference

21 December 2008; 16:45	Ukraine	1–2 (0–0, 1–1, 0–1)	Italy	Aalborg Arena, Aalborg

Game reference

21 December 2008; 20:15	Denmark	3–8 (0–0, 2–3, 1–5)	Austria	Aalborg Arena, Aalborg

Game reference

== See also ==
- 2009 World Junior Ice Hockey Championships
- 2009 World Junior Ice Hockey Championships – Division I
- 2009 World Junior Ice Hockey Championships – Division II
- 2009 World Junior Ice Hockey Championships – Division III
