= Jake Hansen (ice hockey) =

American ice hockey player (born 1989)

- Born: August 21, 1989 (age 36) White Bear Lake, Minnesota, U.S.
- Height: 6 ft 1 in (185 cm)
- Weight: 192 lb (87 kg; 13 st 10 lb)
- Position: Forward
- Shot: Right
- Played for: Springfield Falcons; Ässät; Schwenninger Wild Wings; Rungsted Seier Capital; Coventry Blaze; HKm Zvolen; Nottingham Panthers
- NHL draft: 68th overall, 2007; Columbus Blue Jackets
- Playing career: 2012–2020

Jake Hansen (born August 21, 1989) is an American former professional ice hockey forward. He last played with the Nottingham Panthers in the Elite Ice Hockey League (EIHL).

== Playing career ==
Hansen played junior hockey with the Sioux Falls Stampede in the United States Hockey League. After joined the Stampede mid-year and helping capture the Clark Cup in the 2006–07 season, Hansen was selected 68th overall in the 2007 NHL entry draft by the Columbus Blue Jackets.

Hansen attended University of Minnesota where he played NCAA Division I hockey with the Minnesota Golden Gophers of the Western Collegiate Hockey Association (WCHA), registering 36 goals, 41 assists, 77 points, and 155 penalty minutes in 149 games played. In his sophomore year was named to the WCHA All-Academic Team.

On April 12, 2012, the Columbus Blue Jackets of the National Hockey League signed Hansen to a two-year entry-level contract. He spent the next two seasons playing with the Springfield Falcons, the Blue Jackets' American Hockey League (AHL) affiliate. Following the 2014 season, the Blue Jackets did not give Hansen a qualifying offer, leaving him as an unrestricted free agent.

On August 26, 2014, Hansen left North America and embarked on a European career, as Ässät Pori of the Finnish Liiga announced it had signed Hansen to a two-year contract. Following the conclusion of his two-year tenure in Finland, Hansen opted for a move to Germany, agreeing to a one-year deal with Schwenninger Wild Wings of the Deutsche Eishockey Liga on September 15, 2016. In 46 games during the 2016–17 season, he contributed with 14 points before opting for an early release nearing the completion of the season with the Wild Wings out of playoff contention on February 16, 2017.

== Career statistics ==
| | | | Regular season | | | | | Playoffs |
| Season | Team | League | GP | G | A | Pts | PIM | GP | G | A | Pts | PIM |
|---|---|---|---|---|---|---|---|---|---|---|---|---|
| 2006–07 | Sioux Falls Stampede | USHL | 15 | 4 | 4 | 8 | 14 | 7 | 0 | 2 | 2 | 8 |
| 2007–08 | Sioux Falls Stampede | USHL | 60 | 31 | 27 | 58 | 57 | 3 | 1 | 0 | 1 | 0 |
| 2008–09 | University of Minnesota | WCHA | 33 | 2 | 5 | 7 | 38 | — | — | — | — | — |
| 2009–10 | University of Minnesota | WCHA | 38 | 7 | 5 | 12 | 20 | — | — | — | — | — |
| 2010–11 | University of Minnesota | WCHA | 35 | 11 | 9 | 20 | 49 | — | — | — | — | — |
| 2011–12 | University of Minnesota | WCHA | 43 | 16 | 22 | 38 | 48 | — | — | — | — | — |
| 2011–12 | Springfield Falcons | AHL | 2 | 0 | 1 | 1 | 0 | — | — | — | — | — |
| 2012–13 | Springfield Falcons | AHL | 46 | 4 | 5 | 9 | 26 | 3 | 0 | 0 | 0 | 0 |
| 2013–14 | Springfield Falcons | AHL | 69 | 11 | 13 | 24 | 26 | 3 | 1 | 0 | 1 | 0 |
| 2014–15 | Ässät | Liiga | 42 | 4 | 8 | 12 | 28 | 2 | 0 | 0 | 0 | 6 |
| 2015–16 | Ässät | Liiga | 48 | 4 | 14 | 18 | 61 | — | — | — | — | — |
| 2016–17 | Schwenninger Wild Wings | DEL | 46 | 4 | 10 | 14 | 32 | — | — | — | — | — |
| 2017–18 | Rungsted Seier Capital | DEN | 50 | 18 | 35 | 53 | 52 | 14 | 3 | 6 | 9 | 24 |
| 2018–19 | Coventry Blaze | EIHL | 23 | 6 | 19 | 25 | 14 | — | — | — | — | — |
| 2019–20 | HKm Zvolen | Slovak | 5 | 1 | 0 | 1 | 8 | — | — | — | — | — |
| 2019–20 | Nottingham Panthers | EIHL | 38 | 13 | 27 | 40 | 32 | — | — | — | — | — |
| AHL totals | | | 117 | 15 | 19 | 34 | 52 | 6 | 1 | 0 | 1 | 0 |
| Liiga totals | | | 90 | 8 | 22 | 30 | 89 | 2 | 0 | 0 | 0 | 6 |

== Awards and honors ==
| Award | Year |
|---|---|
USHL
| Clark Cup (Sioux Falls Stampede) | 2007 |
| Second All-Star Team | 2008 |
College
| WCHA All-Academic Team | 2010, 2012 |
