= Phil DeSimone =

American ice hockey player (born 1987)

Philip DeSimone
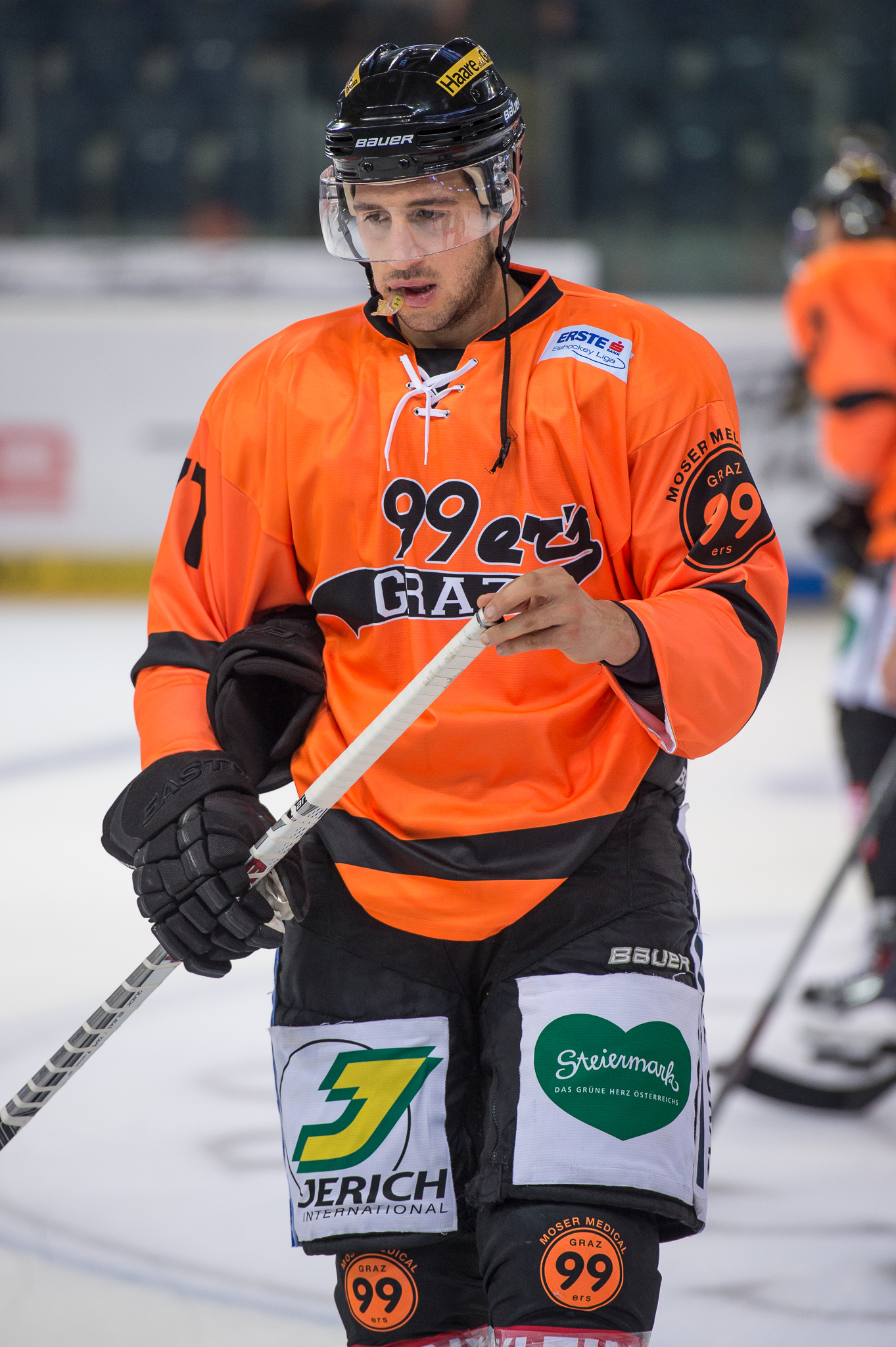
- Born: March 19, 1987 (age 39) East Amherst, New York, U.S.
- Height: 5 ft 10 in (178 cm)
- Weight: 187 lb (85 kg; 13 st 5 lb)
- Position: Center
- Shot: Left
- Played for: Jokerit; Södertälje SK; HC Bolzano; Graz 99ers
- NHL draft: 84th overall, 2007; Washington Capitals
- Playing career: 2011–2017

Philip DeSimone (born 19 March 1987) is an American former professional ice hockey center.

== Playing career ==
Prior to attending the University of New Hampshire, DeSimone played three seasons (2004–07) with the Sioux City Musketeers of the USHL. DeSimone was selected by the Washington Capitals in the 3rd round (84th overall) of the 2007 NHL entry draft.

DeSimone made his professional debut in the 2011–12 season, after signing a one-year contract with the Hamilton Bulldogs of the AHL. After producing an impressive 33 points in his rookie season, DeSimone was signed by fellow AHL club, the Albany Devils, on a one-year contract on July 6, 2012.

After forging his first European season in the Finnish Liiga with Jokerit and the Swedish HockeyAllsvenskan with Södertälje SK and briefly Björklöven IF, DeSimone opted to sign a one-year contract with Champions Hockey League bound HC Bolzano of the EBEL for the 2014–15 season, on August 19, 2014. DeSimone played upon the scoring lines with Bolzano to contribute with 36 points in 49 games.

On June 29, 2015, DeSimone opted to remain in the Austrian League, leaving Bolzano to sign a one-year contract with fellow competitors Graz 99ers. In the 2015–16 season, DeSimone played on the top scoring line of the 99ers, contributing with 9 goals and 22 points in 39 games before opting to end his contract mid-season. He returned to North America, signing for the remainder of the year with the AHL club, the Lehigh Valley Phantoms on January 22, 2016.

On October 26, 2016, DeSimone signed a Professional Tryout Contract with the Utica Comets. After playing 15 games with the HC La Chaux-de-Fonds during the 2016–17 season, DeSimone finished his career with senior men's club, the Stoney Creek Generals in the Allan Cup Hockey league.

== Personal life ==
DeSimone's younger brother Nick is a member of the Calgary Flames organization.

== Career statistics ==
			Regular season					Playoffs
Season	Team	League	GP	G	A	Pts	PIM	GP	G	A	Pts	PIM
2004–05	Sioux City Musketeers	USHL	44	2	7	9	28	6	0	1	1	4
2005–06	Sioux City Musketeers	USHL	60	15	38	53	71	—	—	—	—	—
2006–07	Sioux City Musketeers	USHL	60	26	47	73	60	7	6	6	12	2
2007–08	University of New Hampshire	HE	38	3	10	13	28	—	—	—	—	—
2008–09	University of New Hampshire	HE	38	7	11	18	46	—	—	—	—	—
2009–10	University of New Hampshire	HE	39	10	27	37	38	—	—	—	—	—
2010–11	University of New Hampshire	HE	39	10	31	41	36	—	—	—	—	—
2011–12	Hamilton Bulldogs	AHL	76	14	19	33	36	—	—	—	—	—
2012–13	Albany Devils	AHL	44	9	10	19	30	—	—	—	—	—
2012–13	Trenton Titans	ECHL	3	3	2	5	2	—	—	—	—	—
2013–14	Jokerit	Liiga	8	1	2	3	6	—	—	—	—	—
2013–14	Södertälje SK	Allsv	30	7	14	21	24	—	—	—	—	—
2014–15	HC Bolzano	EBEL	49	14	22	36	16	7	0	3	3	6
2015–16	Graz 99ers	EBEL	39	9	13	22	18	—	—	—	—	—
2015–16	Lehigh Valley Phantoms	AHL	28	5	8	13	26	—	—	—	—	—
2016–17	Utica Comets	AHL	8	1	0	1	2	—	—	—	—	—
2016–17	HC La Chaux-de-Fonds	NLB	15	2	11	13	16	—	—	—	—	—
AHL totals			148	28	37	65	92	—	—	—	—	—

== Awards and honors ==
Award	Year
USHL
First All-Star Team	2007
Forward of the Year	2007
Player of the Year	2007
College
HE All-Academic Team	2010
