= North Korea men's national junior ice hockey team =

North Korea
- The flag of North Korea is the badge used on the players jerseys.
- Association: Ice Hockey Association of the DPR Korea
- Head coach: (North Korea) Hong Ki-chol
- Assistants: (North Korea) Song Chung-song
- Captain: An Chol-hyok
- Most games: Pong Il Ri (40)
- Most points: Chol Min Ri (44)
- IIHF code: PRK

First international
- Denmark 5 - 3 North Korea (Belluno, Italy; March 18, 1988)

Biggest win
- North Korea 20 - 0 Greece (Belgrade, Yugoslavia; December 31, 1990)

Biggest defeat
- Ukraine 16 - 1 North Korea (Odense or Esbjerg, Denmark; December 30, 1992)

IIHF World U20 Championship
- Appearances: 8 (first in 1988)
- Best result: 16th (1992)

International record (W–L–T)
- 20-21-5

The North Korean men's national under 20 ice hockey team is the national under-20 ice hockey team in North Korea. The team represents North Korea at the International Ice Hockey Federation's World Junior Hockey Championship Division III.

== Tournament participation ==
=== World Championships ===
- 1988 – 23rd overall (7th in Pool C)
- 1989 – 19th overall (3rd in Pool C)
- 1990 – 18th overall (2nd in Pool C)
- 1991 – 17th overall (1st in Pool C) Promoted to Pool B
- 1992 – 16th overall (8th in Pool B) Relegated to Pool C
- 1993 – 22nd overall (6th in Pool C)
- 1994–2008 – Did not participate
- 2009 – Division III tournament cancelled
- 2010 – 37th overall (3rd in Division III)
- 2011 – 37th overall (3rd in Division III)
