= Chad Billins =

American ice hockey player (born 1989)

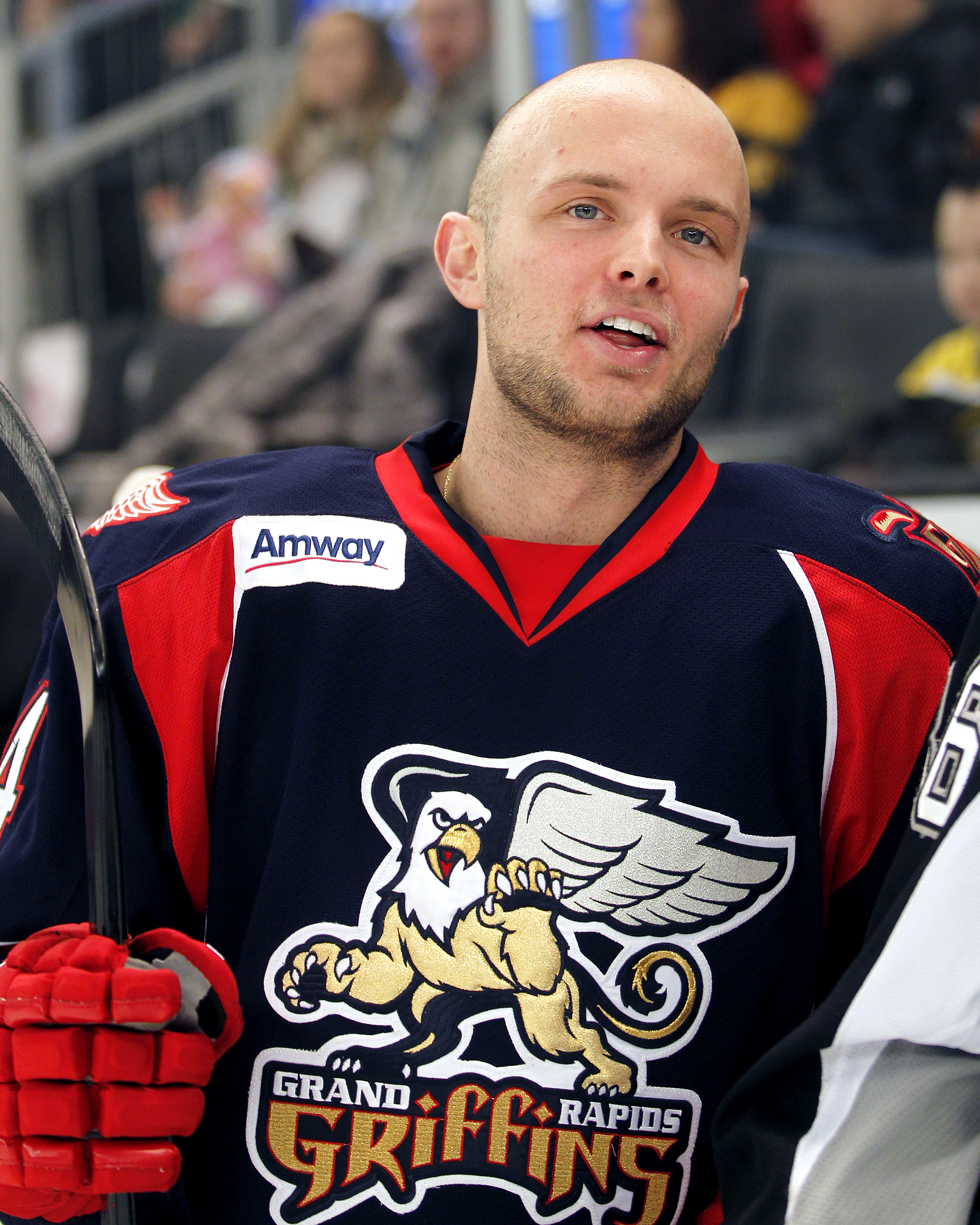
- Born: May 26, 1989 (age 37) Marysville, Michigan, U.S.
- Height: 5 ft 10 in (178 cm)
- Weight: 174 lb (79 kg; 12 st 6 lb)
- Position: Defense
- Shoots: Left
- SHL team Former teams: HV71; Calgary Flames; CSKA Moscow; Luleå HF; Linköpings HC; Adler Mannheim; Brynäs IF
- National team: United States
- NHL draft: Undrafted
- Playing career: 2012–present

Chad Billins (born May 26, 1989) is an American professional ice hockey defenseman currently under contract with HV71 of the Swedish Hockey League (SHL). An undrafted player, Billins played four seasons of college hockey with the Ferris State Bulldogs that culminated in his serving as co-captain of the team that reached the first Frozen Four appearance in school history in 2012. He turned professional in 2012 with the Grand Rapids Griffins of the American Hockey League (AHL) and was a member of their Calder Cup championship team. Billins made his NHL debut in 2013 as a member of the Calgary Flames.

== Playing career ==
Billins played two seasons of junior hockey, first in the North American Hockey League (NAHL) with the Alpena IceDiggers in 2006–07, then the Waterloo Black Hawks of the United States Hockey League (USHL). He then moved to the college ranks, joining the Ferris State Bulldogs of the Central Collegiate Hockey Association (CCHA). Billins played four seasons with Ferris State, culminating with his senior year in 2011–12 when he co-captained the Bulldogs to the first appearance in the Frozen Four in school history.

An undrafted player, Billins turned professional in 2012 and signed an American Hockey League (AHL) contract with the Grand Rapids Griffins for the 2012–13 season. He appeared in 76 games with the Griffins, and his 10 goals were three more than the highest single-season total he reached with Ferris State. He was selected to play for the Western Conference AHL All-Star Team at the 2013 AHL All-Star Game. He appeared in an additional 24 playoff games as the Griffins won the Calder Cup championship.

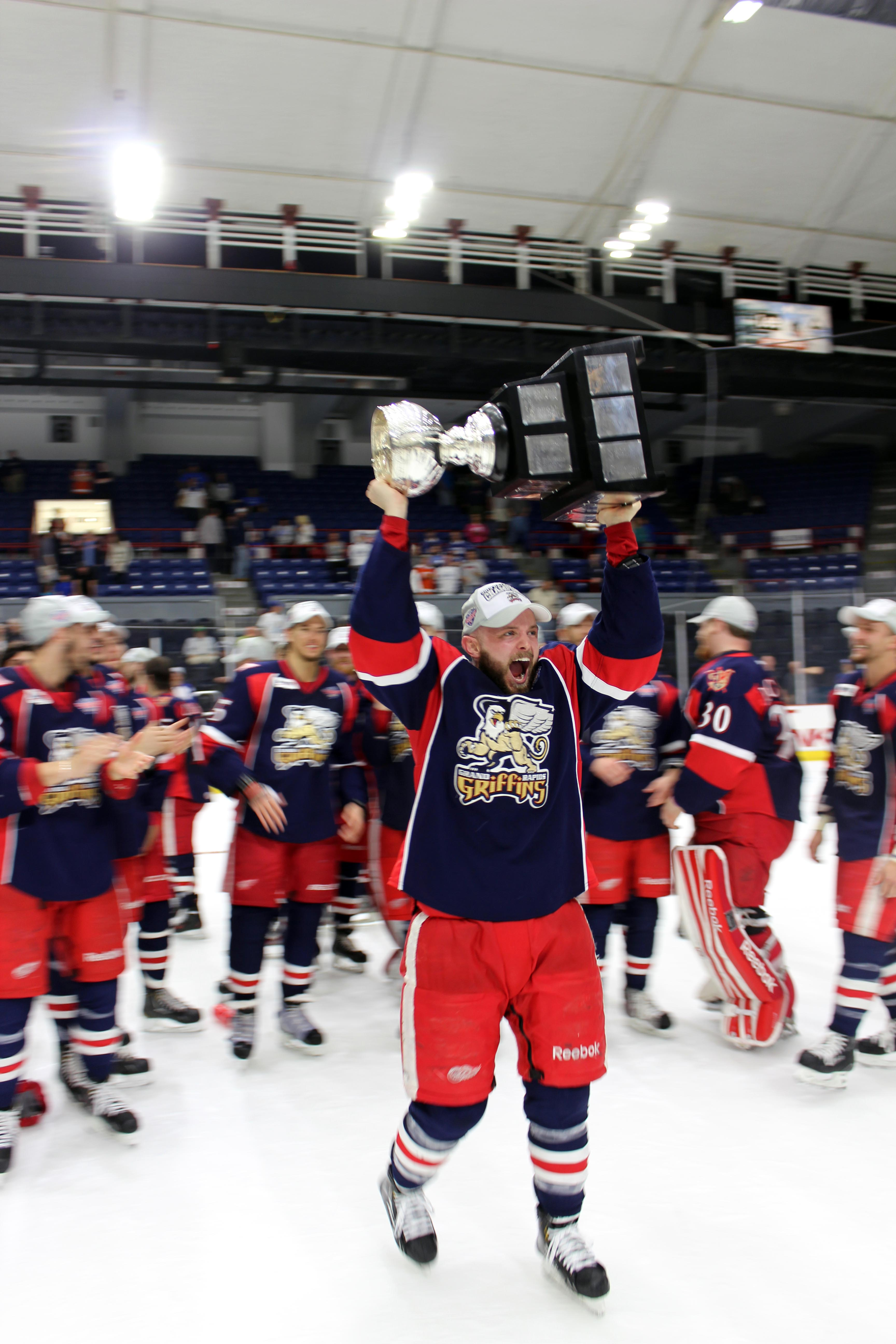
Billins hoisting the Calder Cup in 2013.

His play with the Griffins earned Billins an NHL contract with the Calgary Flames as the team signed him to a two-way deal. He was assigned to Calgary's AHL affiliate, the Abbotsford Heat to start the season. Billins was leading the Heat with five goals when he earned his first NHL recall on November 1, 2013. He made his NHL debut on November 5, and scored his first point by assisting on a Jiří Hudler goal in a 5–1 loss to the Minnesota Wild.

On June 30, 2014, it was announced that Billins had signed a contract with Russian club, CSKA Moscow for the following 2014–15 season. Despite his signing, he was tendered a qualifying offer by the Flames to retain his NHL rights. Billins played in just 21 games with CSKA for 6 points before opting to move to the Swedish Hockey League for the remainder of the season with Luleå HF on December 20, 2014.

Billins joined his third club in under a year, signing a two-year contract with fellow SHL club, Linköpings HC on June 12, 2015.

As a free agent on July 1, 2016, Billins returned to the NHL, securing a one-year, two-way contract with the Vancouver Canucks. In the 2016–17 season, Billins was assigned to AHL affiliate, the Utica Comets for the duration of the campaign. Unable to make a return to the NHL, Billins appeared in 72 games compiling 3 goals and 20 points.

As an impending free agent, Billins opted to resume his European career, returning to former club, Linköpings HC of the SHL, on a two-year contract on April 19, 2017.

After his contract in Sweden, Billins continued his European career in Germany, agreeing to a two-year deal with reigning Champions, Adler Mannheim of the DEL, on May 3, 2019.

After one season with Adler Mannheim, Billins opted to end his contract and return to Sweden by agreeing to a one-year deal with Brynäs IF of the SHL on December 22, 2020.

== Career statistics ==
=== Regular season and playoffs ===
			Regular season					Playoffs
Season	Team	League	GP	G	A	Pts	PIM	GP	G	A	Pts	PIM
2005–06	Little Caesars 18U AAA	MWEHL	22	1	4	5	18	—	—	—	—	—
2005–06	Alpena IceDiggers	NAHL	1	0	0	0	0	—	—	—	—	—
2006–07	Alpena IceDiggers	NAHL	61	7	18	25	98	0	0	0	0	0
2007–08	Waterloo Black Hawks	USHL	60	10	26	36	81	11	5	4	9	0
2008–09	Ferris State Bulldogs	CCHA	27	2	9	11	38	—	—	—	—	—
2009–10	Ferris State Bulldogs	CCHA	40	3	8	11	26	—	—	—	—	—
2010–11	Ferris State Bulldogs	CCHA	39	5	11	16	20	—	—	—	—	—
2011–12	Ferris State Bulldogs	CCHA	43	7	22	29	24	—	—	—	—	—
2012–13	Grand Rapids Griffins	AHL	76	10	27	37	40	24	2	12	14	12
2013–14	Abbotsford Heat	AHL	65	10	32	42	40	4	0	2	2	2
2013–14	Calgary Flames	NHL	10	0	3	3	0	—	—	—	—	—
2014–15	CSKA Moscow	KHL	21	2	4	6	8	—	—	—	—	—
2014–15	Luleå HF	SHL	23	1	5	6	4	9	1	1	2	2
2015–16	Linköpings HC	SHL	50	7	24	31	14	6	2	2	4	4
2016–17	Utica Comets	AHL	72	3	17	20	16	—	—	—	—	—
2017–18	Linköpings HC	SHL	50	4	19	23	20	7	3	4	7	0
2018–19	Linköpings HC	SHL	52	3	18	21	18	—	—	—	—	—
2019–20	Adler Mannheim	DEL	36	2	8	10	16	—	—	—	—	—
2020–21	Brynäs IF	SHL	26	2	8	10	12	—	—	—	—	—
2021–22	HV71	Allsv	52	8	35	43	14	15	6	7	13	6
2022–23	HV71	SHL	49	3	7	10	12	—	—	—	—	—
NHL totals			10	0	3	3	0	—	—	—	—	—
SHL totals			250	20	81	101	80	22	6	7	13	6

=== International ===
Year	Team	Event	Result	GP	G	A	Pts	PIM
2018	United States	OG	7th	5	0	0	0	0
Senior totals				5	0	0	0	0

== Awards and honors ==
Award	Year
College
All-CCHA First Team	2011–12
AHCA West Second-Team All-American	2011–12
NCAA All-Tournament Team	2012
AHL
All-Star Game	2013
Calder Cup (Grand Rapids Griffins)	2013

Awards and achievements
Preceded by Carter Camper	CCHA Scholar-Athlete of the Year; 2011–12	Succeeded by Adam Henderson
