= 2020–21 Champions Hockey League =

European ice hockey tournament

Tournament details
- Dates: Cancelled
- Teams: 32

The 2020–21 Champions Hockey League was scheduled to be the seventh season of the Champions Hockey League, a European ice hockey tournament. The tournament was planned to be competed by 32 teams, with qualification being on sporting merits only. The six founding leagues would have been represented by between three and five teams (based on a three-year league ranking), while seven "challenge leagues" were to be represented by one team each. An additional spot would have been awarded to the 2019–20 IIHF Continental Cup winner. Because of the COVID-19 pandemic, a revised schedule was presented that would have seen the season start directly with a 32-team play-off in October. However, because the situation did not improve sufficiently in Europe, it was announced in early October that the CHL board of directors had cancelled the tournament, without any games being played.

== Team allocation ==
A total of 32 teams from different European first-tier leagues would have participated in the 2020–21 Champions Hockey League. Besides the Continental Cup champions, 24 teams from the six founding leagues, as well as the national champions from Slovakia, Norway, Denmark, France, Belarus, Great Britain and Poland could have qualified.

The qualification for these places is set out in the rules as follows:

1. CHL champions
2. National league champions (play-off winners)
3. Regular season winners
4. Regular season runners-up
5. Regular season third-placed team
6. Regular season fourth-placed team
7. Regular season fifth-placed team

For the Austrian Hockey League teams are however picked in this order:

1. League champions
2. Regular season winners
3. Pick Round winners
4. Pick Round runners-up
5. Losing playoff finalists

Note: Great Britain is the lone exception as the EIHL, in line with their traditions, determine their national champion following the regular season (not in the playoffs).

Due to the COVID-19 pandemic in Europe, many leagues were forced to cancel their seasons early. Places usually reserved for the playoff champions of those leagues were given to the next best team from the regular season, or in the Austrian Hockey League's case, the next best team from the regular season pick round. In the case of the Elite Ice Hockey League, the team leading the regular season at the time of its cancellation were given its Champions Hockey League place. HC '05 Banská Bystrica qualified for the CHL as Slovak Tipsport liga's regular season champion but had to withdraw due to issues related to the arena. They were replaced by HC Neman Grodno.

On 15 September, the CHL announced that the Cardiff Devils had withdrawn from the league due to the suspension of the 2020–21 EIHL season. No new team would replace them.

=== Teams ===
Teams in the 2020–21 Champions Hockey League

Team	City/Area	League	Qualification	Participation	Previous best
(Sweden) Frölunda HC	Gothenburg	Swedish Hockey League	2020 CHL winner	7th	Champion
(Sweden) Luleå HF	Luleå	Swedish Hockey League	regular season winner	5th	Champion
(Sweden) Färjestad BK	Karlstad	Swedish Hockey League	regular season runner-up	5th	Round of 16
(Sweden) Rögle BK	Ängelholm	Swedish Hockey League	regular season third	1st	First appearance
(Sweden) Skellefteå AIK	Skellefteå	Swedish Hockey League	regular season fourth	6th	Semi-finals
(Switzerland) ZSC Lions	Zürich	National League	regular season winner	6th	Quarter-finals
(Switzerland) EV Zug	Zug	National League	regular season runner-up	7th	Quarter-finals
(Switzerland) HC Davos	Davos	National League	regular season third	4th	Semi-finals
(Switzerland) Genève-Servette HC	Geneva	National League	regular season fourth	3rd	Round of 16
(Switzerland) EHC Biel	Biel/Bienne	National League	regular season fifth	2nd	Quarter-finals
(Germany) Red Bull München	Munich	Deutsche Eishockey Liga	regular season winner	6th	Final
(Germany) Adler Mannheim	Mannheim	Deutsche Eishockey Liga	regular season runner-up	6th	Round of 16
(Germany) Straubing Tigers	Straubing	Deutsche Eishockey Liga	regular season third	1st	First appearance
(Germany) Eisbären Berlin	Berlin	Deutsche Eishockey Liga	regular season fourth	5th	Round of 16
(Finland) Kärpät	Oulu	Liiga	regular season winner	6th	Final
(Finland) Lukko	Rauma	Liiga	regular season runner-up	4th	Semi-finals
(Finland) Tappara	Tampere	Liiga	regular season third	7th	Round of 16
(Finland) Ilves	Tampere	Liiga	regular season fourth	1st	First appearance
(Czech Republic) Bílí Tygři Liberec	Liberec	Czech Extraliga	regular season winner	6th	Semi-finals
(Czech Republic) Oceláři Třinec	Třinec	Czech Extraliga	regular season runner-up	6th	Semi-finals
(Czech Republic) HC Sparta Praha	Prague	Czech Extraliga	regular season third	4th	Final
(Austria) Red Bull Salzburg	Salzburg	Austrian Hockey League	regular season first round winner	6th	Semi-finals
(Italy) HC Bolzano	Bolzano	Austrian Hockey League	regular season pick round winner	3rd	Round of 16
(Austria) Vienna Capitals	Vienna	Austrian Hockey League	regular season pick round third	7th	Round of 16
(Denmark) SønderjyskE Ishockey	Vojens	Metal Ligaen	Continental Cup winner	3rd	Group stage
(Denmark) Aalborg Pirates	Aalborg	Metal Ligaen	regular season winner	2nd	Group stage
(Belarus) Yunost Minsk	Minsk	Belarusian Extraleague	play-off champion	4th	Round of 16
(Belarus) HC Neman Grodno	Grodno	Belarusian Extraleague	regular season runner-up	4th	Group stage
(France) Brûleurs de Loups	Grenoble	Ligue Magnus	regular season winner	3rd	Group stage
(Norway) Stavanger Oilers	Stavanger	GET-ligaen	regular season champion	5th	Round of 32
(Poland) GKS Tychy	Tychy	Polska Hokej Liga	regular season champion	3rd	Group stage
