= 2010 World Junior Ice Hockey Championships – Division III =

2010 IIHF U20 World Championship Division III
Tournament details
- Host country: Turkey
- City: Istanbul
- Venue: 1 (in 1 host city)
- Dates: 4–10 January 2010
- Teams: 7

The 2010 World Junior Ice Hockey Championship Division III was an international ice hockey tournament organized by the International Ice Hockey Federation, the fourth level of the 2010 World Junior Ice Hockey Championships. It took place in Istanbul, Turkey, from 4 to 10 January 2010. The top two teams in the tournament were promoted to Division II for the 2011 IIHF World Junior Championship.

== Participating teams ==
Team	Qualification
Iceland	Placed 6th in 2008 Division II (Group A) and were relegated.
New Zealand	Placed 1st in 2008 Division III.
Australia	Placed 4th in 2008 Division III.
Turkey	Hosts; placed 6th in 2008 Division III.
Bulgaria	Placed 7th in 2008 Division III.
North Korea	Last participated in 1993.
Chinese Taipei	First participation in World Championship.

== Preliminary round ==
The top two teams in each group advanced to the semi-finals, while the remaining teams played for fifth to seventh place.

=== Group A ===
Pos	Team	Pld	W	OTW	OTL	L	GF	GA	GD	Pts	Qualification
1	Australia	2	2	0	0	0	16	2	+14	6	Semifinals
2	New Zealand	2	1	0	0	1	6	6	0	3	Semifinals
3	Bulgaria	2	0	0	0	2	2	16	−14	0	5th–7th place playoffs

Source: IIHF

4 January 2010; 13:00	Australia	11–1 (4–1, 2–0, 5–0)	Bulgaria	Istanbul Arena

Game reference

6 January 2010; 13:00	Bulgaria	1–5 (0–2, 0–0, 1–3)	New Zealand	Istanbul Arena

Game reference

7 January 2010; 13:00	New Zealand	1–5 (0–1, 0–4, 1–0)	Australia	Istanbul Arena

Game reference

=== Group B ===
Pos	Team	Pld	W	OTW	OTL	L	GF	GA	GD	Pts	Qualification
1	Iceland	3	3	0	0	0	25	6	+19	9	Semifinals
2	North Korea	3	2	0	0	1	18	13	+5	6	Semifinals
3	Chinese Taipei	3	1	0	0	2	12	22	−10	3	5th–7th place playoffs
4	Turkey (H)	3	0	0	0	3	9	23	−14	0	5th–7th place playoffs

Source: IIHF
(H) Host

4 January 2010; 16:30	Iceland	11–1 (3–0, 5–0, 3–1)	Chinese Taipei	Istanbul Arena

Game reference

4 January 2010; 20:00	Turkey	3–8 (0–3, 1–1, 2–4)	North Korea	Istanbul Arena

Game reference

6 January 2010; 16:30	North Korea	3–6 (1–2, 0–3, 2–1)	Iceland	Istanbul Arena

Game reference

6 January 2010; 20:00	Turkey	4–7 (0–3, 3–3, 1–1)	Chinese Taipei	Istanbul Arena

Game reference

7 January 2010; 16:30	Chinese Taipei	4–7 (2–2, 1–2, 1–3)	North Korea	Istanbul Arena

Game reference

7 January 2010; 20:00	Iceland	8–2 (3–0, 3–2, 2–0)	Turkey	Istanbul Arena

Game reference

== Final round ==
=== 5th–7th place playoffs ===
5th–7th place semifinal			5th place game
			B3	Chinese Taipei	6
A3	Bulgaria	7	B4	Turkey	3
B4	Turkey	8

==== 5th–7th place semifinal ====
9 January 2010	Bulgaria	7–8 (3–4, 2–3, 2–1)	Turkey	Istanbul Arena

Game reference

==== 5th place game ====
10 January 2010; 13:00	Chinese Taipei	6–3 (2–2, 2–0, 2–1)	Turkey	Istanbul Arena

Game reference

=== 1st–4th place playoffs ===
The two finalists, Australia and Iceland, were promoted to Division II for the 2011 IIHF World U20 Championship.

Semifinals
A1	Australia	4
B2	North Korea	3
B1	Iceland	4
A2	New Zealand	0

Final
A1	Australia	3
B1	Iceland	1
3rd place game
B2	North Korea	6
A2	New Zealand	5

==== Semifinals ====
9 January 2010; 16:30	Iceland	4–0 (2–0, 2–0, 0–0)	New Zealand	Istanbul Arena

Game reference

9 January 2010; 20:00	Australia	4–3 (OT) (1–0, 2–2, 0–1) (1–0)	North Korea	Istanbul Arena

Game reference

==== 3rd place game ====
10 January 2010; 16:30	New Zealand	5–6 (OT) (1–0, 2–4, 2–1) (0–1)	North Korea	Istanbul Arena

Game reference

==== Final ====
10 January 2010; 20:00	Iceland	1–3 (0–1, 0–2, 1–0)	Australia	Istanbul Arena

Game reference

== Final standings ==
Position	Team	Promotion
1	Australia	Promoted to the 2011 Division II
2	Iceland	Promoted to the 2011 Division II
3	North Korea	
4	New Zealand	
5	Chinese Taipei	
6	Turkey	
7	Bulgaria	

== See also ==
- 2010 World Junior Ice Hockey Championships
- 2010 World Junior Ice Hockey Championships – Division I
- 2010 World Junior Ice Hockey Championships – Division II
