= Silivrikapı Ice Skating Hall =

Ice skating venue in Istanbul, Turkey

Silivrikapi Ice Skating Hall
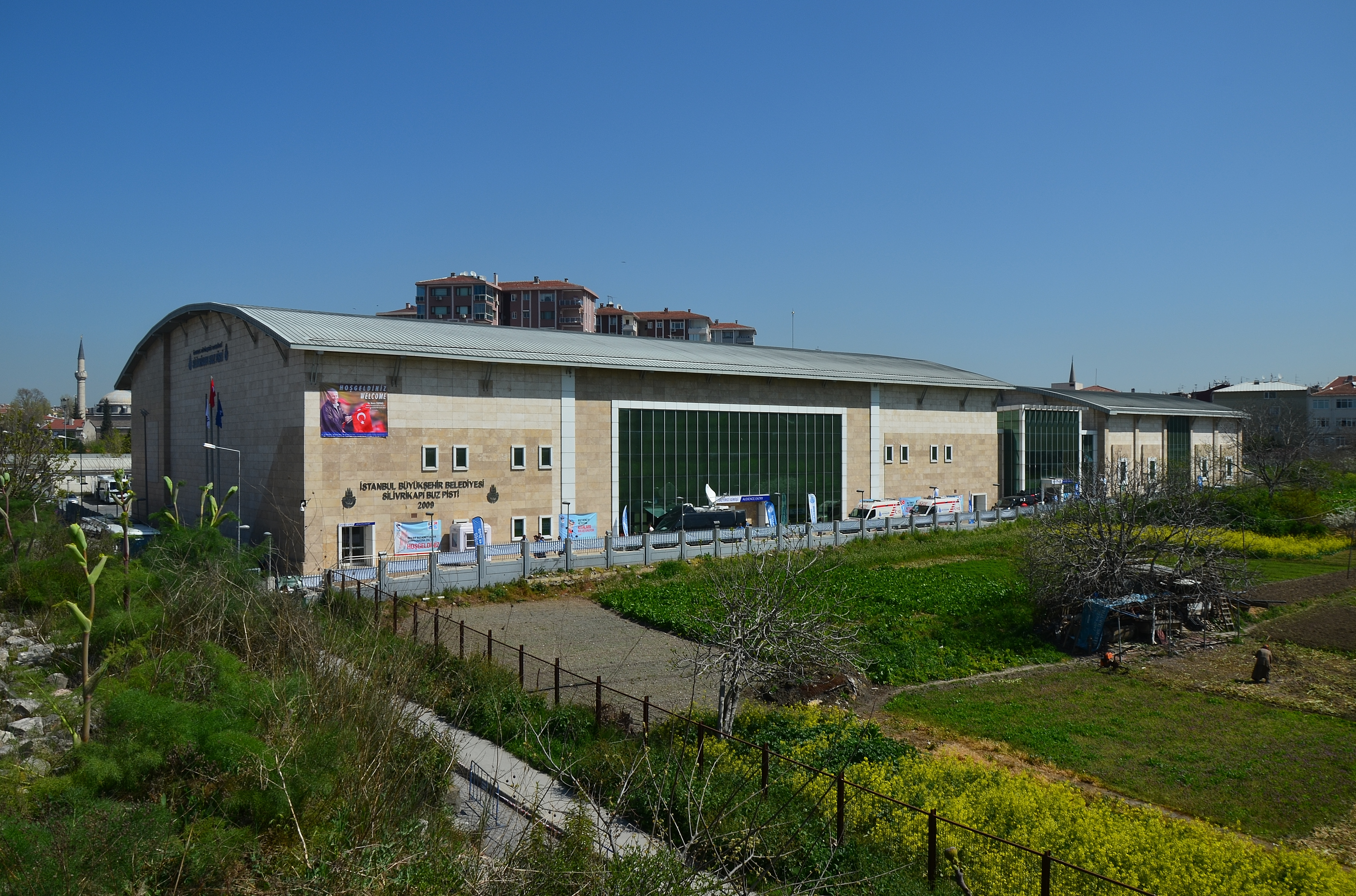
- Silvirikapı Ice Rink in Fatih, Istanbul
- Interactive map of Silivrikapi Ice Skating Hall
- Full name: Silivrikapi Skating Hall and Recreation Center
- Location: Silivrikapi, Fatih, Istanbul Province, Turkey
- Coordinates: 41.00344°N 28.92208°E
- Owner: Istanbul Metropolitan Municipality
- Capacity: 900
- Surface: 8,950 m^{2} (96,300 sq ft)

Construction
- Groundbreaking: 2007
- Opened: 2009
- Cost: ₺ 30 million (approx. US$20 million)

Silivrikapi Ice Skating Hall (Istanbul)

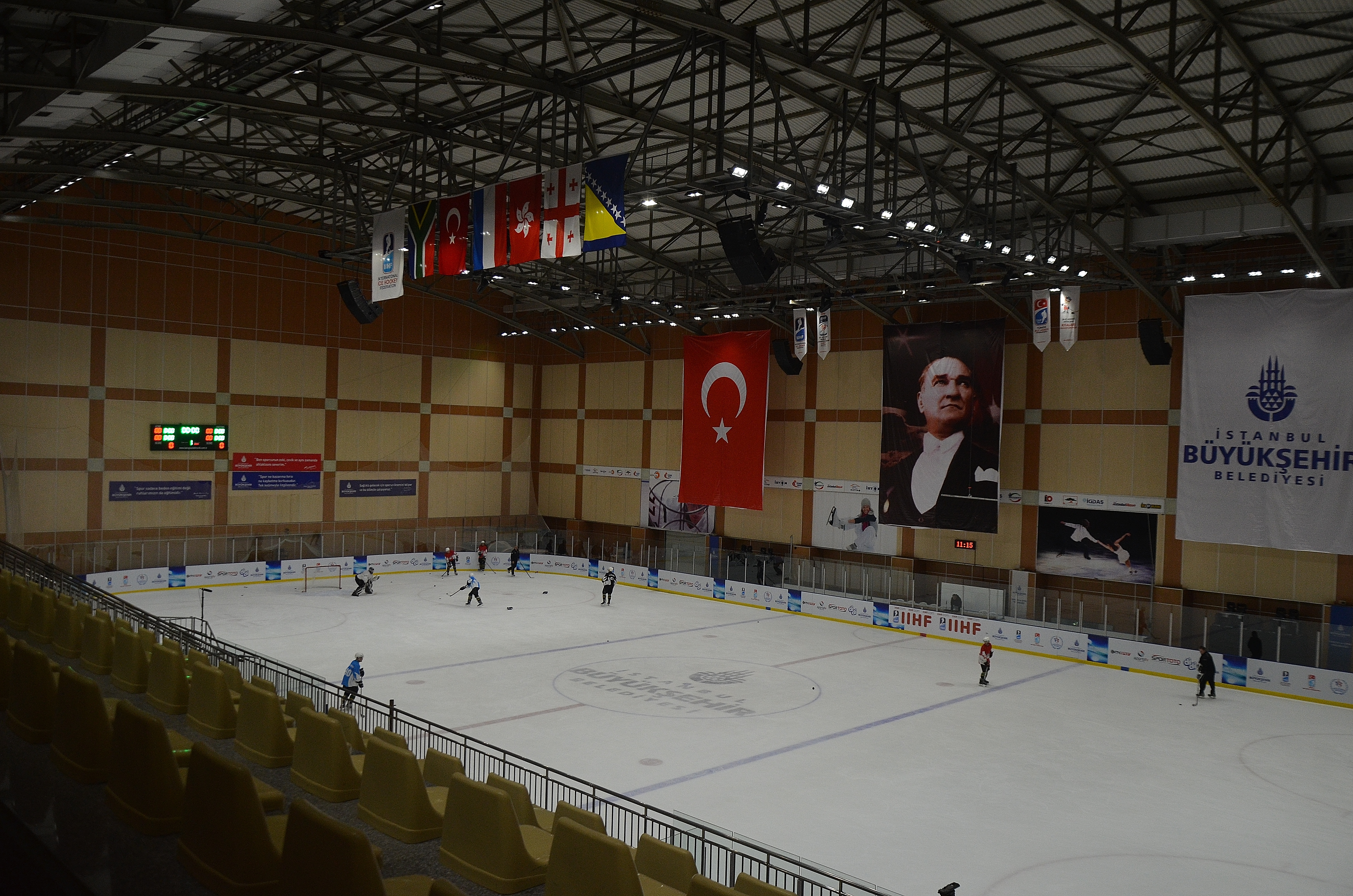
A view from the inside of Silivrikapı Ice Rink.

Silivrikapı Ice Skating Hall, full name Silivrikapı Ice Skating Hall and Recreation Center, shortly Silivrikapı Ice Rink, (Turkish: Silivrikapı Buz Pateni Salonu), is an indoor ice skating and ice hockey arena located at Silivrikapı neighborhood of Fatih district in Istanbul, Turkey. It was opened in September 2009.

The arena consists of an Olympic-size rink of 1,740 m^{2} (18,700 sq ft) with a seating capacity of 900 people, and another one of 600 m^{2} (6,500 sq ft) for 200 spectators used as training rink.

Covering an area of 8,950 m^{2} (96,300 sq ft), the construction of the complex cost ₺ 30 million (approx. US$20 million).

== History ==
Asked by the Turkish Ice Skating Federation, the Metropolitan Municipality of Istanbul planned to build an ice rink in 1989. The district municipality of Fatih allocated the current site for the building of the venue. However, the government was reluctant to provide the funds required. The planning and the works proceeded only slow since the project proved to be difficult due to lack of technical know-how about the construction of an ice rink.

Shortly before the completion of the construction, a major earthquake in 1999 devastated parts of Istanbul. Due to an expertise, the building was declared unsafe. The structure was then demolished, and the project was abandoned.

Years after, the project to build an ice rink resumed with pressure from the ice skating community and financial support from the government. In 2007, the construction of a new ice skating venue began at the same site in Silivrikapı that was finally completed in September 2009. Shortly after its opening, the venue hosted International Skating Union's Junior Grand Prix of Figure Skating event.

Silivrikapı Ice Skating Hall hosts ice hockey clubs of Istanbul, which carried out their trainings in the past at the Galleria Ice Rink, a small size ice rink in a shopping mall not far from the Silivrikapı Arena.

== International events hosted ==
- 15th Junior Grand Prix Bosphorus October 14–18, 2009
- 2010 World Junior Ice Hockey Championships – Division III January 4–10, 2010
- 2016 IIHF World Championship Division III March 31 – April 6, 2016

== Places of interest ==
- Zeytinburnu Ice Rink
- Walls of Constantinople, Silivrikapı (literally: Silivri Gate) is a gate of the old city walls in the west,
- Basketball Development Centre, Türkiye

== Transport ==
- City bus lines 93, 93C, 93M and 93T serve the venue.
