= Pepsi Little People's Golf Championships =

The Pepsi Little People's Golf Tournament is one of the largest international golf tournaments in the world for ages 3 to 19 and occurs every year in the community of Quincy, Illinois and several other communities in the region depending on the age divisions.

== Family ==
Pepsi Little People's Golf Tournament is a very family-oriented event. Every year, as part of the tournament, there is a family picnic golf event held. Parents and family members meet and eat together while enjoying a casual game of golf.

== History ==
The event was founded by Nan Ryan in 1973 after a statement she'd heard while on a Quincy golf course, the statement was "It's a shame the midwest doesn't have a junior tournament like the International in Florida". 33 years later, the tournament in Quincy became ranked as the third most widely attended junior golf event in the world. Pepsi became the primary sponsor of the golf tournament soon after.

=== The First Little People's and after ===
The first Little People's event drew 174 girls and boys and was hosted by the Cedar Crest Country Club in Quincy, which the event in later years had to be split between all the golf courses in town because of the larger crowds. The Westview Golf Course was added to the event in 1975, Spring Lake Country Club was later added in 1993, and finally the Knights of Columbus Golf Course was added in 1994 to accommodate the players ages 3 through 7.

After the success of Tiger Woods, attendance of the Little People's event jumped to 672 kids in 1997, although Woods had never played in the Little People's, his impact on the sport was felt, after which another course was added, the Norwoods Golf Club in nearby Hannibal, Missouri. In 2007, when the new 18 - 19 division was created, the Deer Run Golf Course in Hamilton, Illinois was added to the line-up after attendance reached 922.

Now the internationally known tournament for boys and girls aged three through 17 is played at five golf courses in the Quincy, Illinois, area, with the collegiate division, for men and women 18 through 21, playing at the Harry Mussatto (Western Illinois University) Golf Course in Macomb, Illinois. There are currently seven age divisions for boys and seven age divisions for girls in Pepsi's Little People Golf Championship (3-5, 6-7, 8-9, 10-11, 12-13, 14-15, 16-18).
