= Joe Sova =

American ice hockey player (born 1988)

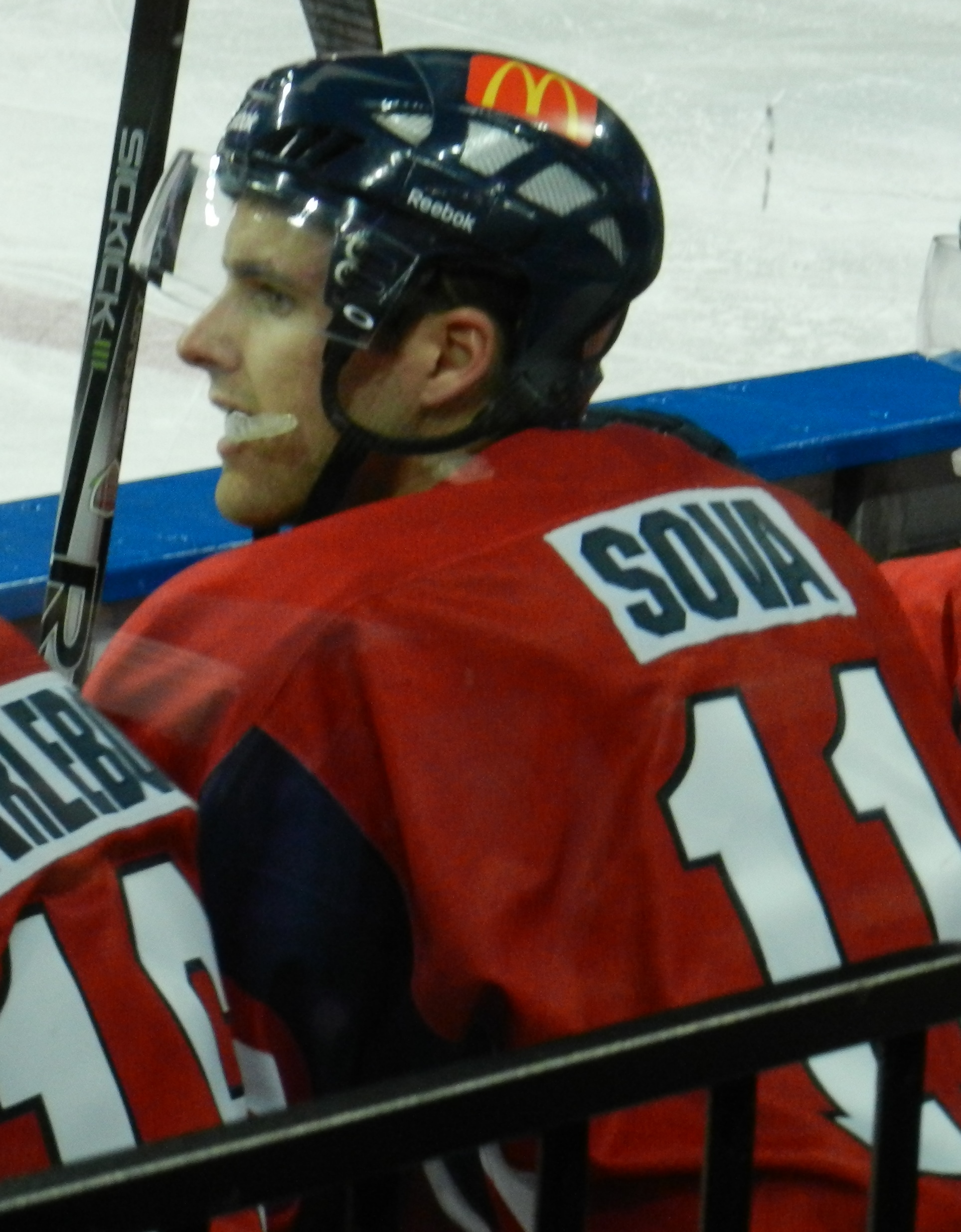
- Sova with the Kalamazoo Wings in 2011
- Born: May 8, 1988 (age 38) Berwyn, Illinois, USA
- Height: 6 ft 3 in (191 cm)
- Weight: 181 lb (82 kg; 12 st 13 lb)
- Position: Defense
- Shoots: Left
- ECHL team Former teams: Toledo Walleye; Albany Devils; Charlotte Checkers; Chicago Wolves
- NHL draft: Undrafted
- Playing career: 2011–present

Joe Sova (born May 8, 1988) is an American professional ice hockey defenseman. He is currently playing with the Quad City Storm of the SPHL.

On March 19, 2011, Sova was signed as a free agent by the New Jersey Devils to an entry-level contract.

On January 20, 2012, the New Jersey Devils traded Sova to the Carolina Hurricanes, along with New Jersey's 4th round choice in the 2012 NHL entry draft (Jaccob Slavin), in exchange for Alexei Ponikarovsky.

On August 28, 2013, Sova signed as a free agent to return to the Kalamazoo Wings of the ECHL. After two seasons with the Wings Sova extended his stay in re-signing for a potential third campaign in Kalamazoo. However, prior to the 2015–16 season, Sova was traded by the Wings to the Tulsa Oilers on October 15, 2015.
