= Ben Davies (ice hockey) =

Welsh ice hockey player (born 1991)

- Born: 18 January 1991 (age 35) Cardiff, Wales
- Height: 1.72 m (5 ft 8 in)
- Weight: 75 kg (165 lb; 11 st 11 lb)
- Position: Forward
- Shoots: Right
- EIHL team Former teams: Cardiff Devils; Cardiff Dragons; Basingstoke Bison; Braehead Clan; Norfolk Admirals; Coventry Blaze; Melbourne Mustangs; Guildford Flames; Swindon Wildcats; Manchester Storm
- National team: Great Britain
- NHL draft: Undrafted
- Playing career: 2007–present

Ben Davies (born 18 January 1991) is a Welsh professional ice hockey player who is a forward for the Cardiff Devils of the Elite Ice Hockey League (EIHL)

He represented Great Britain at the 2019 IIHF World Championship, where he scored the overtime goal against France to avoid Britain's relegation to Division I, and again at the 2021 IIHF World Championship, 2022 IIHF World Championship and 2024 IIHF World Championship.
