= 2006–07 USHL season =

2006-07 USHL season
- League: United States Hockey League
- Sport: Ice hockey
- Duration: Regular season October 2006 – April 2007; Playoffs; April – May 2007
- Games: 60
- Teams: 12

Anderson Cup Champions
- Season champions: Waterloo Black Hawks

Clark Cup Champions
- Champions: Sioux Falls Stampede

USHL seasons
- 2005–06 2007–08

The 2006–07 USHL season is the 28th season of the United States Hockey League as an all-junior league. The regular season began on October 5, 2006, and concluded on April 14, 2007, with the regular season champion winning the Anderson Cup. The 2006–07 season added the Ohio Junior Blue Jackets as an expansion team.

The 2007 Clark Cup playoffs featured all twelve teams playing in division-based seven-game series in the opening round, followed by a quarterfinal round-robin where the winners of the opening round play each other team once. The semifinal match-ups were made by pitting the top teams in the two round-robin series against the second-place team from the opposite division in a single-elimination game with the two victors meeting in a single-game championship match.

== Regular season ==
Final standings
Note: GP = Games played; W = Wins; L = Losses; OTL = Overtime losses; SL = Shootout losses; GF = Goals for; GA = Goals against; PTS = Points; x = clinched playoff berth; y = clinched division title; z = clinched league title

=== East Division ===
Team	GP	W	L	OTL	PTS	GF	GA
zWaterloo Black Hawks	60	39	17	4	82	225	157
Cedar Rapids RoughRiders	60	37	18	5	79	239	189
Indiana Ice	60	27	28	5	59	182	223
Green Bay Gamblers	60	24	30	6	54	176	198
Ohio Junior Blue Jackets	60	13	40	7	33	119	242
Chicago Steel	60	12	46	2	26	150	253

=== West Division ===
Team	GP	W	L	OTL	PTS	GF	GA
yOmaha Lancers	60	38	17	5	81	218	191
Tri-City Storm	60	36	18	6	78	203	171
Lincoln Stars	60	37	20	3	77	241	200
Sioux Falls Stampede	60	34	21	5	73	195	174
Sioux City Musketeers	60	34	21	5	73	219	178
Des Moines Buccaneers	60	29	21	10	68	215	216

== Clark Cup Playoffs ==
The first two rounds are restricted to intra-division matchups.

=== Opening Round ===
==== East Division ====
Waterloo Black Hawks vs. Chicago Steel

Date	Away	Score	Home	Score	Notes
April 19	Chicago	0	Waterloo	2	
April 21	Chicago	1	Waterloo	5	
April 22	Waterloo	3	Chicago	6	
April 24	Waterloo	4	Chicago	1	
April 25	Chicago	4	Waterloo	5	

Waterloo wins best-of-seven series 4 games to 1

Cedar Rapids RoughRiders vs. Ohio Junior Blue Jackets

Date	Away	Score	Home	Score	Notes
April 17	Cedar Rapids	8	Ohio	0	
April 18	Cedar Rapids	1	Ohio	0	OT
April 20	Ohio	1	Cedar Rapids	5	
April 21	Ohio	2	Cedar Rapids	5	

Cedar Rapids wins best-of-seven series 4 games to 0

Indiana Ice vs. Green Bay Gamblers

Date	Away	Score	Home	Score	Notes
April 18	Green Bay	2	Indiana	4	
April 20	Green Bay	2	Indiana	3	OT
April 21	Indiana	6	Green Bay	2	
April 23	Indiana	5	Green Bay	3	

Indiana wins best-of-seven series 4 games to 0

==== West Division ====
Omaha Lancers vs. Des Moines Buccaneers

Date	Away	Score	Home	Score	Notes
April 18	Des Moines	4	Omaha	2	
April 20	Omaha	2	Des Moines	3	
April 21	Des Moines	4	Omaha	3	OT
April 24	Omaha	3	Des Moines	1	
April 27	Des Moines	3	Omaha	2	2OT

Des Moines wins best-of-seven series 4 games to 1

Tri-City Storm vs. Sioux City Musketeers

Date	Away	Score	Home	Score	Notes
April 20	Sioux City	4	Tri-City	2	
April 21	Sioux City	3	Tri-City	4	
April 24	Tri-City	2	Sioux City	1	
April 25	Tri-City	1	Sioux City	3	
April 26	Sioux City	6	Tri-City	3	
April 28	Tri-City	4	Sioux City	3	
April 30	Sioux City	2	Tri-City	3	

Tri-City wins best-of-seven series 4 games to 3

Lincoln Stars vs. Sioux Falls Stampede

Date	Away	Score	Home	Score	Notes
April 18	Lincoln	2	Sioux Falls	8	
April 20	Lincoln	1	Sioux Falls	5	
April 21	Sioux Falls	5	Lincoln	0	
April 23	Sioux Falls	8	Lincoln	7	

Sioux Falls wins best-of-seven series 4 games to 0

=== Quarterfinals ===
==== East Division ====
Round-Robin

Date	Away	Score	Home	Score	Notes
May 2	Waterloo	3	Indiana	4	
May 4	Indiana	4	Cedar Rapids	3	
May 5	Cedar Rapids	0	Waterloo	6	

Indiana advances as the top seed from the east with Waterloo as the second seed

==== West Division ====
Round-Robin

Date	Away	Score	Home	Score	Notes
May 2	Tri-City	0	Des Moines	3	
May 4	Des Moines	3	Sioux Falls	2	
May 5	Sioux Falls	4	Tri-City	3	OT

Des Moines advances as the top seed from the west with Sioux Falls as the second seed

=== Final Four ===
Semi-finals
E1	Indiana Ice	2
W2	Sioux Falls Stampede	3
W1	Des Moines Buccaneers	0
E2	Waterloo Black Hawks	1

Clark Cup Championship
W2	Sioux Falls Stampede	3
E2	Waterloo Black Hawks	0

== Players ==
=== Scoring leaders ===
	Player	Team	GP	G	A	Pts	+/-	PIM
1	Richard Purslow	Des Moines Buccaneers	60	27	55	82	-2	28
2	Phil DeSimone	Sioux City Musketeers	60	26	47	73	+13	60
3	Jacob Cepis	Cedar Rapids RoughRiders	58	34	38	72	+18	59
4	Jared Brown	Lincoln Stars	60	30	41	71	+22	30
	James Marcou	Waterloo Black Hawks	58	24	47	71	+12	60
	Carter Camper	Lincoln Stars	56	23	48	71	+24	40
7	Aaron Palushaj	Des Moines Buccaneers	56	22	45	67	+5	62
8	Mark Olver	Omaha Lancers	57	29	35	64	+27	84
	Ben Ryan	Des Moines Buccaneers	59	22	42	64	-2	66
10	Stephen Schultz	Lincoln Stars	57	31	32	63	+24	74
	Garrett Roe	Indiana Ice	57	24	39	63	-3	143
	Max Pacioretty	Sioux City Musketeers	60	21	42	63	+20	119
	John Kemp	Indiana Ice	50	16	47	63	+3	34

=== Leading goaltenders ===
	Player	Team	GP	MIN	W	L	OTL	SO	GA	GAA	SV	SV%
1	Ryan Rondeau	Waterloo Black Hawks	33	1807	17	8	4	2	74	2.46	684	.902
2	Matthew DiGirolamo	Waterloo Black Hawks	33	1816	22	9	0	3	77	2.54	735	.905
3	Matt Lundin	Sioux Falls Stampede	44	2611	24	15	5	2	111	2.55	1156	.912
4	Ian Keserich	Tri-City Storm	47	2546	26	13	5	3	111	2.62	1005	.901
5	Jerry Kuhn	Sioux City Musketeers	49	2737	27	18	3	3	122	2.67	1426	.921

== Awards ==
- Coach of the Year: P.K. O'Handley Waterloo Black Hawks
- Curt Hammer Award: Zach Redmond Sioux Falls Stampede
- Defenseman of the Year: Jeff Petry Des Moines Buccaneers
- Executive of the Year: Michael Schupay Indiana Ice
- Forward of the Year: Phil DeSimone Sioux City Musketeers
- General Manager of the Year: Mike Hastings Omaha Lancers
- Goaltender of the Year: Drew Palmisano Omaha Lancers
- Organization of the Year: Waterloo Black Hawks
- Player of the Year: Phil DeSimone Sioux City Musketeers
- Rookie of the Year: Max Pacioretty Sioux City Musketeers

=== First Team All-Stars ===
- Matt DiGirolamo (Goalie) Waterloo Black Hawks
- Derrick LaPoint (Defense) Green Bay Gamblers
- Jeff Petry (Defense) Des Moines Buccaneers
- Phil DeSimone (Forward) Sioux City Musketeers
- Jared Brown (Forward) Lincoln Stars
- Jacob Cepis (Forward) Omaha Lancers

=== Second Team All-Stars ===
- Drew Palmisano (Goalie) Omaha Lancers
- Colby Cohen (Defense) Lincoln Stars
- Nick Petrecki (Defense) Omaha Lancers
- Richard Purslow (Forward) Des Moines Buccaneers
- James Marcou (Forward) Waterloo Black Hawks
- Carter Camper (Forward) Lincoln Stars
