= Robert Lachowicz =

English ice hockey player (born 1990)

- Born: 8 February 1990 (age 36) Nottingham, England
- Height: 5 ft 10 in (178 cm)
- Weight: 176 lb (80 kg; 12 st 8 lb)
- Position: Forward
- Shoots: Left
- AIHL team Former teams: Sydney Ice Dogs; Manchester Phoenix; Füchse Duisburg; Telford Tigers; Nottingham Panthers; Guildford Flames; Perth Thunder; Glasgow Clan
- National team: Great Britain
- Playing career: 2006–present

Robert Lachowicz (/ˈlækəvɪtʃ/ LACK-ə-vitch; born 8 February 1990) is an English professional ice hockey player who is a forward for the Sydney Ice Dogs of the Australian Ice Hockey League (AIHL).

== Playing career ==
Lachowicz spent over ten years playing with the Nottingham Panthers, winning nine trophies. He also had a brief stint with Manchester Phoenix in 2009, playing in the English Premier Ice Hockey League, before returning to play in Nottingham. He is also a member of the Great Britain national ice hockey team.

In October 2020, following the suspension of the 2020–21 Elite League season due to ongoing coronavirus restrictions, Lachowicz moved to Germany to sign for Füchse Duisburg.

In February 2021, Lachowicz signed for Telford Tigers ahead of their NIHL Spring Cup series.

After playing for the Nottingham Panthers in the 2021 Elite Series, Lachowicz ended his 14-year association with the club by signing for fellow EIHL side Guildford Flames ahead of the 2021–22 season.

After two seasons with Guildford, Lachowicz signed for fellow Elite League club Glasgow Clan in June 2023.

Following his contract in Glasgow expiring, Lachowicz signed a contract with Perth Thunder in the AIHL..

== Career statistics ==
=== Regular season and playoffs ===
			Regular season					Playoffs
Season	Team	League	GP	G	A	Pts	PIM	GP	G	A	Pts	PIM
2005–06	Nottingham Lions	ENL	3	1	0	1	0	—	—	—	—	—
2006–07	Nottingham Lions	ENL	16	16	12	28	12	—	—	—	—	—
2007–08	Nottingham Lions	ENL	20	20	16	36	32	3	2	1	3	4
2007–08	Nottingham Panthers	EIHL	28	1	0	1	0	—	—	—	—	—
2008–09	Nottingham Lions	ENL	20	12	16	28	32	—	—	—	—	—
2008–09	Nottingham Panthers	EIHL	33	1	3	4	2	3	0	0	0	0
2009–10	Manchester Phoenix	EPIHL	51	28	27	55	6	3	1	0	1	0
2009–10	Nottingham Panthers	EIHL	7	1	2	3	2	—	—	—	—	—
2010–11	Nottingham Panthers	EIHL	54	11	18	29	6	4	1	0	1	0
2011–12	Nottingham Panthers	EIHL	54	20	26	46	10	4	1	1	2	2
2012–13	Nottingham Panthers	EIHL	52	13	25	38	6	4	2	1	3	0
2013–14	Nottingham Panthers	EIHL	51	18	33	51	34	2	0	0	0	0
2014–15	Nottingham Panthers	EIHL	52	14	25	39	14	2	0	0	0	0
2015–16	Nottingham Panthers	EIHL	49	3	9	12	6	4	0	0	0	0
2016–17	Nottingham Panthers	EIHL	52	4	16	20	10	2	0	1	1	0
2017–18	Nottingham Panthers	EIHL	56	8	13	21	2	4	0	1	1	2
2018–19	Nottingham Panthers	EIHL	58	2	8	10	8	3	0	1	1	0
2019–20	Nottingham Panthers	EIHL	46	4	7	11	4	—	—	—	—	—
2020–21	Nottingham Panthers	EIHL Series	15	0	6	6	4	—	—	—	—	—
2021–22	Guildford Flames	EIHL	54	6	11	17	6	4	0	0	0	2
2022–23	Guildford Flames	EIHL	54	8	15	23	8	2	0	0	0	0
2023–24	Glasgow Clan	EIHL	52	15	17	32	6	—	—	—	—	—
2024–25	Glasgow Clan	EIHL	51	6	4	10	16	2	0	0	0	2
2025	Perth Thunder	AIHL	22	11	32	43	6	2	0	0	0	0
2025–26	Glasgow Clan	EIHL	51	5	11	16	4	4	0	0	0	0
EIHL totals			854	140	243	383	144	44	4	5	9	8

=== International ===
Year	Team	Event	GP	G	A	Pts	PIM
2007	Great Britain U18	WJC-18 (D1)	5	0	0	0	0
2008	Great Britain U18	WJC-18 (D2)	5	1	0	1	4
2009	Great Britain U20	WJC-20 (D2)	5	7	6	13	14
2010	Great Britain U20	WJC-20 (D2)	5	5	4	9	2
2011	Great Britain	WC (D1)	5	0	2	2	0
2012	Great Britain	WC (D1A)	5	0	1	1	2
2013	Great Britain	OGQ	6	1	0	1	2
2013	Great Britain	WC (D1A)	5	0	0	0	0
2014	Great Britain	WC (D1B)	5	0	3	3	0
2015	Great Britain	WC (D1B)	5	0	1	1	0
2016	Great Britain	OGQ	3	1	2	3	2
2016	Great Britain	WC (D1B)	5	1	3	4	0
2017	Great Britain	WC (D1B)	5	1	3	4	0
2018	Great Britain	WC (D1A)	5	0	1	1	0
2019	Great Britain	WC	7	0	1	1	14
2020	Great Britain	OGQ	3	0	1	1	0
2021	Great Britain	WC	7	0	0	0	2
2022	Great Britain	WC	7	0	0	0	0
2023	Great Britain	WC (D1A)	5	0	2	2	0
2024	Great Britain	WC	7	0	1	1	2
2024	Great Britain	OGQ	6	0	3	3	2
2025	Great Britain	WC (D1A)	5	0	1	1	0
2026	Great Britain	WC	7	1	0	1	0
Junior totals			20	13	10	23	20
Senior totals			103	5	25	30	26
