= 2011 World Junior Ice Hockey Championships – Division III =

2011 IIHF U20 World Championship Division III

Tournament details
- Host country: Mexico
- City: Mexico City
- Venues: 2 (in 1 host city)
- Dates: 9–18 January 2011
- Teams: 7

The 2011 World Junior Ice Hockey Championship Division III was an international ice hockey tournament organized by the International Ice Hockey Federation, the fourth level of the 2011 World Junior Ice Hockey Championships. It took place in Mexico City, Mexico, from 9 to 18 January 2011. The top two teams in the tournament were promoted to Division II for the 2012 IIHF World Junior Championship.

== Participating teams ==
Team	Qualification
Mexico	Hosts; placed 6th in Division II (Group A) last year and were relegated.
Serbia	Placed 6th in Division II (Group B) last year and were relegated.
North Korea	Placed 3rd in Division III last year.
New Zealand	Placed 4th in Division III last year.
Chinese Taipei	Placed 5th in Division III last year.
Turkey	Placed 6th in Division III last year.
Bulgaria	Placed 7th in Division III last year.

== Final standings ==
Pos	Team	Pld	W	OTW	OTL	L	GF	GA	GD	Pts	Promotion
1	Mexico (H)	6	6	0	0	0	39	9	+30	18	Promoted to the 2012 Division II B
2	Serbia	6	5	0	0	1	56	8	+48	15	Promoted to the 2012 Division II B
3	North Korea	6	4	0	0	2	37	22	+15	12	
4	Turkey	6	3	0	0	3	36	33	+3	9	
5	New Zealand	6	2	0	0	4	17	43	−26	6	
6	Bulgaria	6	0	1	0	5	13	52	−39	2	
7	Chinese Taipei	6	0	0	1	5	16	47	−31	1	

Source: IIHF
(H) Host

== Match results ==
All times are local (CST – UTC−6).

9 January 2011; 13:30	North Korea	12–4 (3–0, 4–2, 5–2)	Turkey	Lomas Verdes Rink; Attendance: 150

Game reference

9 January 2011; 17:00	New Zealand	5–3 (2–1, 0–0, 3–2)	Chinese Taipei	Lomas Verdes Rink; Attendance: 100

Game reference

9 January 2011; 20:30	Mexico	8–0 (1–0, 4–0, 3–0)	Bulgaria	Zócalo Square; Attendance: 3,000

Game reference

10 January 2011; 13:30	Serbia	17–1 (6–0, 5–0, 6–1)	Bulgaria	Lomas Verdes Rink; Attendance: 100

Game reference

10 January 2011; 17:00	Chinese Taipei	4–6 (3–0, 1–2, 0–4)	North Korea	Lomas Verdes Rink; Attendance: 200

Game reference

10 January 2011; 20:30	Turkey	5–7 (4–3, 1–2, 0–2)	Mexico	Lomas Verdes Rink; Attendance: 750

Game reference

12 January 2011; 13:30	New Zealand	5–2 (1–0, 2–1, 2–1)	Bulgaria	Lomas Verdes Rink; Attendance: 100

Game reference

12 January 2011; 17:00	Serbia	7–1 (3–1, 0–0, 4–0)	Turkey	Lomas Verdes Rink; Attendance: 200

Game reference

12 January 2011; 20:30	Mexico	9–1 (0–1, 4–0, 5–0)	Chinese Taipei	Lomas Verdes Rink; Attendance: 1,500

Game reference

14 January 2011; 13:30	Bulgaria	1–8 (0–4, 1–3, 0–1)	North Korea	Lomas Verdes Rink; Attendance: 100

Game reference

14 January 2011; 17:00	Turkey	9–1 (3–1, 2–0, 4–0)	New Zealand	Lomas Verdes Rink; Attendance: 220

Game reference

14 January 2011; 20:30	Chinese Taipei	0–13 (0–3, 0–3, 0–7)	Serbia	Lomas Verdes Rink; Attendance: 100

Game reference

15 January 2011; 13:30	Turkey	9–3 (2–2, 4–0, 3–1)	Bulgaria	Lomas Verdes Rink; Attendance: 200

Game reference

15 January 2011; 17:00	Serbia	13–2 (7–0, 4–1, 2–1)	New Zealand	Lomas Verdes Rink; Attendance: 600

Game reference

15 January 2011; 20:30	Mexico	6–0 (3–0, 0–0, 3–0)	North Korea	Lomas Verdes Rink; Attendance: 2,500

Game reference

17 January 2011; 13:30	North Korea	0–4 (0–0, 0–4, 0–0)	Serbia	Lomas Verdes Rink; Attendance: 80

Game reference

17 January 2011; 17:00	Bulgaria	6–5 GWS (1–4, 2–0, 2–1, 0–0, 1–0)	Chinese Taipei	Lomas Verdes Rink; Attendance: 140

Game reference

17 January 2011; 20:30	New Zealand	1–5 (1–0, 0–1, 0–4)	Mexico	Lomas Verdes Rink; Attendance: 2,000

Game reference

18 January 2011; 13:30	North Korea	11–3 (2–0, 4–2, 5–1)	New Zealand	Lomas Verdes Rink; Attendance: 100

Game reference

18 January 2011; 17:00	Chinese Taipei	3–8 (0–2, 0–3, 3–3)	Turkey	Lomas Verdes Rink; Attendance: 250

Game reference

18 January 2011; 20:30	Serbia	2–4 (0–2, 1–0, 1–2)	Mexico	Lomas Verdes Rink; Attendance: 3,000

Game reference

== Statistics ==
=== Top 10 scorers ===
Pos	Player	Country	GP	G	A	Pts	+/−	PIM
1	Aleksa Lukovic	Serbia	6	11	10	21	+16	8
2	Serkan Gumus	Turkey	6	11	8	19	+2	26
3	Yusuf Halil	Turkey	6	7	10	17	+3	18
4	Dimitrije Filipovic	Serbia	6	6	9	15	+13	12
5	Viktor Cengeri	Serbia	6	1	12	13	+14	0
6	Christian Smithers	Mexico	6	6	6	12	+10	6
7	Cuneyt Baykan	Turkey	6	3	9	12	+3	6
8	Mihajlo Korac	Serbia	6	6	5	11	+14	2
9	Hector Carrero	Mexico	6	6	4	10	+11	0
10	Andrija Babic	Serbia	6	5	5	10	+8	18

=== Goaltending leaders ===
(minimum 40% team's total ice time)

Pos	Player	Country	MINS	GA	Sv%	GAA	SO
1	Allan Cukier	Mexico	225:04	3	95.83	0.80	1
2	Arsenije Rankovic	Serbia	282:31	5	95.65	1.06	1
3	Fikri Atali	Turkey	320:00	26	89.43	4.88	0
4	Pak Il	North Korea	235:46	12	87.88	3.05	0
5	Liao Yu-cheng	Chinese Taipei	294:22	32	85.39	6.52	0
