= Attila Orbán =

Hungarian ice hockey player (born 1990)

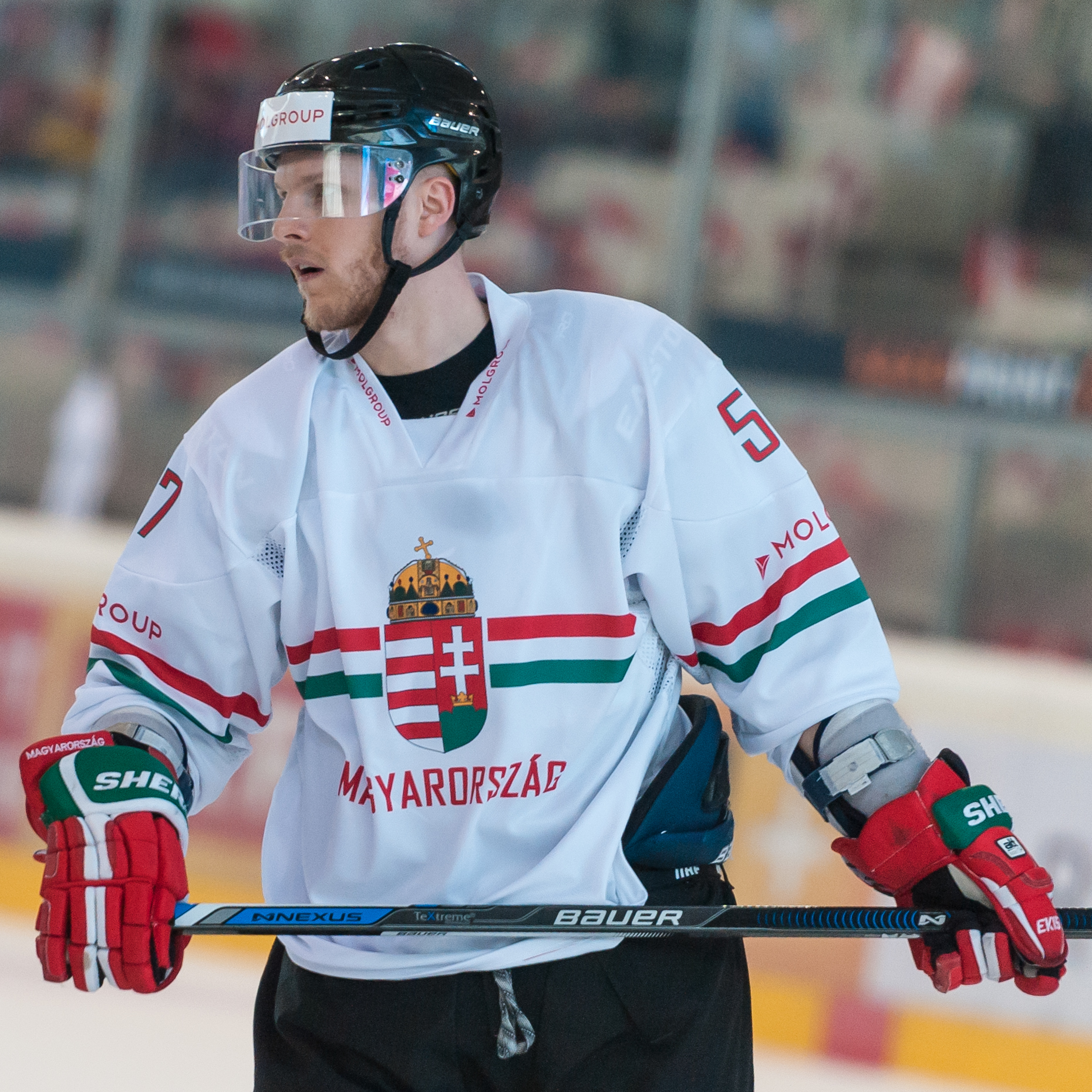
- Born: June 1, 1990 (age 35) Szekszárd, Hungary
- Height: 6 ft 3 in (191 cm)
- Weight: 220 lb (100 kg; 15 st 10 lb)
- Position: Defenceman
- Shoots: Left
- Erste team Former teams: Dunaújvárosi Acélbikák; Fehérvár AV19
- National team: Hungary
- Playing career: 2006–present

Attila Orbán is a Hungarian professional ice hockey player currently playing for Dunaújvárosi Acélbikák in the Erste Liga. He is also member of the Hungarian national ice hockey team.
