= Artyom Kisly =

Belarusian ice hockey player

- Born: April 28, 1989 (age 35); Grodno, Byelorussian Soviet Socialist Republic, Soviet Union
- Height: 5 ft 9 in (175 cm)
- Weight: 168 lb (76 kg; 12 st 0 lb)
- Position: Forward
- Shoots: Right
- BXL team: HC Neman Grodno
- National team: Belarus
- Playing career: 2008–present

Artyom Kisly (born April 28, 1989) is a Belarusian ice hockey player who is currently playing for HC Neman Grodno of the Belarusian Extraleague.

Kisly competed in the 2013 IIHF World Championship as a member of the Belarus men's national ice hockey team.
