= Pepsi Arena =

Pepsi Arena, Pepsi Centre, or Pepsi Coliseum may refer to:

- Pepsi Arena in Quincy, Illinois, the home arena of the Quincy Hawks basketball and volleyball teams
- Ball Arena in Denver, Colorado. Formerly known as "Pepsi Center" from 1999 to 2020.
- Colisée de Québec in Quebec City, Canada. Formerly known as "Colisée Pepsi" from November 18, 1999 to 2015.
- Corner Brook Civic Centre in Corner Brook, Newfoundland, Canada. Formerly known as "Pepsi Centre".
- Pepsi Center WTC in Mexico City, Mexico, located at the World Trade Center Mexico City.
- Polish Army Stadium in Warsaw, Poland. Known as the "Pepsi Arena" from 2011 to 2015
- MVP Arena in Albany, New York. Known as the "Pepsi Arena" from 1997 to 2007.
- Corteva Coliseum in Indianapolis, Indiana, located at the Indiana State Fairgrounds. Known as the "Pepsi Coliseum" from 1991 to 2012.
- Montreal Forum in Montreal, Quebec. Renovated in 1998 and transformed into an entertainment centre known as the "Pepsi Forum" from 1999 to 2011.
- Northtown Center in Amherst, New York (located on the campus of the University at Buffalo). Known as the "Amherst Pepsi Center" from 1999 to 2010.
