= 2006–07 Israeli Hockey League season =

Season of the Israeli Hockey League

The 2006–07 Israeli Hockey League season was the 16th season of Israel's hockey league. Five teams participated in the league, and the Haifa Hawks won the championship.

== Regular season ==
Pos	Team	Pld	W	D	L	GF	GA	GD	Pts
1	HC Metulla	8	7	1	0	24	8	+16	15
2	Haifa Hawks	8	6	0	2	55	14	+41	12
3	Rishon-le-Zion	8	4	1	3	33	23	+10	9
4	HC Ma'alot	8	2	0	6	25	38	−13	4
5	HC Bat Yam	8	0	0	8	11	65	−54	0

== Playoffs ==
=== Semifinals ===
- Rishon-le-Zion - Haifa Hawks 1:4
- HC Ma'alot - HC Metulla 0:5

=== Final ===
- Haifa Hawks - HC Metulla 4:3 SO
