= 2005–06 Israeli Hockey League season =

Season of the Israeli Hockey League

The 2005–06 Israeli Hockey League season was the 15th season of Israel's hockey league. Five teams participated in the league, and the Haifa Hawks won the championship.

== Regular season ==
Pos	Team	Pld	W	D	L	GF	GA	GD	Pts
1	Haifa Hawks	8	7	0	1	54	13	+41	14
2	HC Bat Yam II	8	7	0	1	49	17	+32	14
3	HC Metulla	8	3	0	5	29	22	+7	6
4	HC Ma'alot	8	3	0	5	31	37	−6	6
5	HC Bat Yam I	8	0	0	8	5	79	−74	0

== Playoffs ==
=== Semifinals ===
- Haifa Hawks - HC Ma'alot 6:2
- HC Bat Yam II - HC Metulla 3:0

=== Final ===
- HC Bat Yam II - Haifa Hawks 0:5
