= 2000–01 Israeli Hockey League season =

Season of the Israeli Hockey League

The 2000–01 Israeli Hockey League season was the 10th season of Israel's hockey league. Five teams participated in the league, and HC Maccabi Amos Lod won the championship.

== Regular season ==
Pos	Team	Pld	W	D	L	GF	GA	GD	Pts
1	HC Ma’alot	16	14	0	2	81	32	+49	28
2	HC Maccabi Amos Lod	16	12	1	3	63	37	+26	25
3	HC Metulla	16	8	0	8	45	37	+8	16
4	HC Haifa	16	4	1	11	25	43	−18	9
5	HC Bat Yam	16	1	0	15	15	80	−65	2

== Playoffs ==
=== Semifinals ===
- HC Ma’alot - HC Haifa 7:2
- HC Maccabi Amos Lod - HC Metulla 4:3

=== Final ===
- HC Ma’alot - HC Maccabi Amos Lod 1:2
