= 2002–03 Israeli Hockey League season =

Season of the Israeli Hockey League

The 2002–03 season was the 12th season of the Israeli Hockey League. Five teams participated in the league, and HC Ma'alot won the championship.

== Regular season ==
Pos	Team	Pld	W	D	L	GF	GA	GD	Pts
1	HC Ma'alot	8	7	0	1	45	14	+31	14
2	HC Maccabi Amos Lod	8	6	0	2	56	18	+38	12
3	HC Metulla	8	4	0	4	25	36	−11	8
4	HC Bat Yam	8	2	0	6	18	31	−13	4
5	HC Haifa	8	1	0	7	15	60	−45	2
