= 2004–05 Israeli Hockey League season =

Season of the Israeli Hockey League

The 2004–05 Israeli Hockey League season was the 14th season of Israel's hockey league. Five teams participated in the league, and HC Maccabi Amos Lod won the championship.

== Regular season ==
Pos	Team	Pld	W	D	L	GF	GA	GD	Pts
1	HC Maccabi Amos Lod	8	8	0	0	55	11	+44	16
2	HC Haifa	8	5	1	2	53	17	+36	11
3	HC Metulla	8	4	1	3	19	18	+1	9
4	HC Ma'alot	8	1	0	7	15	46	−31	2
5	HC Bat Yam	8	1	0	7	11	61	−50	2
