= 1995–96 Israeli Hockey League season =

Season of the Israeli Hockey League

The 1995–96 Israeli Hockey League season was the fifth season of Israel's hockey league. Six teams participated in the league, and the Lions Jerusalem won the championship and HC Bat Yam ending as runners-up.

== Regular season ==
Pos	Team
1	Lions Jerusalem
2	HC Bat Yam
3	HC Metulla
4	HC Haifa
5	HC Holon
6	HC Ramat Gan
