= 1998–99 Israeli Hockey League season =

Season of the Israeli Hockey League

The 1998–99 Israeli Hockey League season was the eighth season of Israel's hockey league. Four teams participated in the league, and HC Metulla won the championship.

== Regular season ==
Pos	Team	Pld	GF	GA	GD	Pts
1	HC Maccabi Amos Lod	6	39	16	+23	11
2	HC Metulla	6	33	12	+21	9
3	HC Haifa	6	12	26	−14	2
4	HC Bat Yam	6	17	47	−30	2

== Playoffs ==
=== Semifinals ===
- HC Maccabi Amos Lod - HC Bat Yam 3:1
- HC Metulla - HC Haifa 6:2

=== Final ===
- HC Maccabi Amos Lod - HC Metulla 3:4/5:6 SO
