= 1999–2000 Israeli Hockey League season =

Season of the Israeli Hockey League

The 1999–2000 Israeli Hockey League season was the ninth season of Israel's hockey league. Five teams participated in the league, and HC Ma'alot won the championship.

== Regular season ==
Pos	Team	Pld	GF	GA	GD	Pts
1	HC Maccabi Amos Lod	16	74	20	+54	26
2	HC Ma’alot	16	63	18	+45	24
3	HC Metulla	16	39	32	+7	16
4	HC Bat Yam	16	20	65	−45	10
5	HC Haifa	16	20	81	−61	4

== Playoffs ==
=== Semifinals ===
- HC Maccabi Amos Lod - HC Bat Yam 6:3
- HC Ma’alot - HC Metulla 9:3

=== Final ===
- HC Maccabi Amos Lod - HC Ma’alot 4:6
