= 2010–11 Israeli Hockey League season =

Season of the Israeli Hockey League

The 2010–11 Israeli Hockey League season was the 20th season of Israel's hockey league. Eight teams participated in the league, and HC Metulla won the league title.

== Regular season ==
=== Group A ===
1. HC Metulla 15
2. HC Ma'alot 9
3. Maccabi Metula 8
4. HC Bat Yam 4

=== Group B ===
1. HC Herzlia 18
2. Haifa Hawks 16
3. HC Bat Yam II (Holon) 3
4. Rehovot 3

== Final tournament ==
3rd place

- Icebergs Bat Yam – Maccabi Zairei Metulla 2:6 (2:0, 0:3, 0:3)

Final

- HC Metulla - Monfort Ma'alot 5:1 (0:0, 1:0, 4:1)
