= 2001–02 Israeli Hockey League season =

Season of the Israeli Hockey League

The 2001–02 Israeli Hockey League season was the 11th season of Israel's hockey league. Five teams participated in the league, and HC Ma'alot won the championship.

== Regular season ==
Pos	Team	Pld	GF	GA	GD	Pts
1	HC Ma’alot	16	89	38	+51	29
2	HC Maccabi Amos Lod	16	70	42	+28	26
3	HC Metulla	16	48	39	+9	14
4	Hawk Haifa	16	24	52	−28	8
5	HC Bat Yam	16	23	83	−60	3
