= 2013–14 Israeli Hockey League season =

Season of the Israeli Hockey League

The 2013–14 Israeli Hockey League season was the 23rd season of the Israeli Hockey League, the top level of ice hockey in Israel. Eight teams participated in the league, and the Rishon Devils won the championship for the 2nd time in a row.

== First round ==
=== North ===
Pos	Team	Pld	W	OTW	OTL	L	GF	GA	GD	Pts
1	HC Ma'alot	6	5	0	1	0	28	8	+20	16
2	Maccabi Metulla	6	4	1	0	1	33	15	+18	14
3	Haifa Hawks	6	2	0	0	4	13	19	−6	6
4	HC Metulla	6	0	0	0	6	9	41	−32	0

=== Center ===
Pos	Team	Pld	W	OTW	OTL	L	GF	GA	GD	Pts
1	Rishon Devils	6	5	0	0	1	43	12	+31	15
2	Horses Kfar Saba	6	4	0	0	2	40	35	+5	12
3	HC Bat Yam	6	3	0	0	3	28	32	−4	9
4	Dragons Nes Ziona	6	0	0	0	6	10	42	−32	0

== Final round ==
Pos	Team	Pld	W	OTW	OTL	L	GF	GA	GD	Pts
1	Rishon Devils	6	3	0	2	1	31	23	+8	11
2	Horses Kfar Saba	6	3	0	1	2	22	28	−6	10
3	HC Ma'alot	6	2	1	0	3	17	17	0	8
4	Maccabi Metulla	6	1	2	0	3	10	12	−2	7

=== 3rd place ===
Maccabi Metulla - HC Ma'alot 0 : 2

=== Final ===
Rishon Devils - Horses Kfar Saba 9:1 (1:1, 4:0, 4:0)
