= 2011–12 Israeli Hockey League season =

Season of the Israeli Hockey League

The 2011–12 Israeli Hockey League season was the 21st season of Israel's hockey league. 10 teams participated in the league, and the Maccabi Metulla Eggenbreggers won the championship.

== First round ==
Pos	Team	Pld	W	OTW	OTL	L	GF	GA	GD	Pts
1	Icebergs Bat Yam	9	7	1	0	1	53	16	+37	23
2	Maccabi Metulla Eggenbreggers	9	7	0	0	2	61	16	+45	21
3	Hawks Haifa	9	7	0	0	2	44	17	+27	21
4	Monfort Ma'alot	9	6	0	1	2	64	23	+41	19
5	Devils Rishon le Zion	9	6	0	0	3	51	17	+34	18
6	HC Metulla	9	4	1	1	3	41	16	+25	15
7	Ice Time Herzliya	9	2	0	0	7	35	44	−9	6
8	Jet Turtles Holon	9	2	0	0	7	12	95	−83	6
9	HC Afula	9	0	1	0	8	3	63	−60	2
10	Rishon le Zion II	9	0	0	1	8	8	75	−67	1

== Final round ==
Pos	Team	Pld	W	OTW	OTL	L	GF	GA	GD	Pts
1	Maccabi Metulla Eggenbreggers	6	4	0	0	2	24	12	+12	12
2	Icebergs Bat Yam	6	4	0	0	2	16	15	+1	12
3	Monfort Ma'alot	6	3	0	0	3	21	17	+4	9
4	Hawks Haifa	6	1	0	0	5	8	25	−17	3

== Playoffs ==
=== 3rd place game ===
- Monfort Ma'alot - Hawks Haifa 3:0

=== Final ===
- Maccabi Metulla Eggenbreggers - Icebergs Bat Yam 2:1 (0:0, 0:1, 1:0, 0:0, 1:0)
