= 2012–13 Israeli Hockey League season =

Season of the Israeli Hockey League

The 2012–13 Israeli Hockey League season was the 22nd season of the Israeli Hockey League, the top level of ice hockey in Israel. Seven teams participated in the league, and the Rishon Devils won the championship.

== First round ==
| Pos | Team | Pld | W | OTW | OTL | L | GF | GA | GD | Pts |
|---|---|---|---|---|---|---|---|---|---|---|
| 1 | Rishon Devils | 6 | 5 | 0 | 1 | 0 | 37 | 9 | +28 | 16 |
| 2 | Monfort Maalot | 6 | 5 | 0 | 0 | 1 | 32 | 14 | +18 | 15 |
| 3 | Maccabi Metulla Eggenbreggers | 6 | 4 | 1 | 0 | 1 | 26 | 8 | +18 | 14 |
| 4 | Horses Kfar Saba | 6 | 3 | 0 | 0 | 3 | 31 | 26 | +5 | 9 |
| 5 | Haifa Hawks | 6 | 2 | 0 | 0 | 4 | 12 | 19 | −7 | 6 |
| 6 | HC Bat Yam | 6 | 1 | 0 | 0 | 5 | 14 | 33 | −19 | 3 |
| 7 | HC Metulla | 6 | 0 | 0 | 0 | 6 | 5 | 48 | −43 | 0 |

== Final round ==
| Pos | Team | Pld | W | OTW | OTL | L | GF | GA | GD | BP | Pts |
|---|---|---|---|---|---|---|---|---|---|---|---|
| 1 | Rishon Devils | 4 | 3 | 0 | 0 | 1 | 13 | 10 | +3 | 7 | 16 |
| 2 | Monfort Maalot | 4 | 2 | 0 | 0 | 2 | 10 | 8 | +2 | 6 | 12 |
| 3 | Maccabi Metulla Eggenbreggers | 4 | 1 | 1 | 0 | 2 | 9 | 10 | −1 | 5 | 10 |
| 4 | Horses Kfar Saba | 4 | 1 | 0 | 1 | 2 | 9 | 14 | −5 | 0 | 4 |

=== 3rd place ===
Maccabi Metulla - Horses - : +

=== Final ===
Monfort - Rishon Devils 1:4 (0:1, 0:2, 1:1)
