= Ice hockey in Israel =

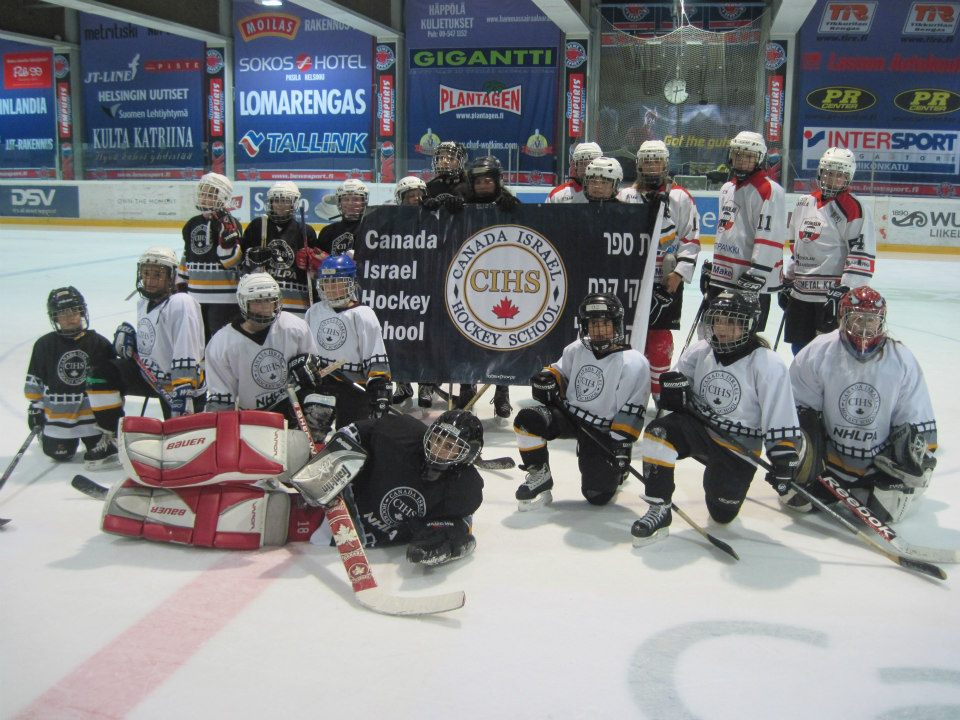
- CIHS hockey club players, in training camp, Finland
- Country: Israel
- Governing body: Ice Hockey Federation of Israel
- National team: Men's national team
- First played: 1980s
- Clubs: Israeli League

Ice hockey in Israel started as a minor sport. Until the construction of the new arena in Holon, many Israeli hockey players were members of the Canada Israel Hockey School (since renamed the "Hockey Academy of Israel") housed at the Canada Centre in Metulla.

== History ==
Ice Hockey has been played in Israel since 1986 when Israel's first ice rink opened in Kiryat Motzkin. In 1988 after the second rink opened in Bat Yam, near Tel Aviv, the Israel Ice Hockey and Figure Skating Association was founded in 1988 by immigrants from Canada, America, Europe and the former Soviet Union. Israel joined the International Ice Hockey Federation in 1991 and first participated in an IIHF world championships in 1992. During the 1990s there was a large influx of Russian immigrants to Israel, some of whom were professional ice hockey players. Boris Mindel, one of these immigrants, established a junior program at the Canada Centre in Metulla, in northern Israel.

Roger Neilson, former coach in the National Hockey League, helped to create summer ice hockey camps in Metulla in 1998.

The Canada Israel Hockey School (recently renamed the Hockey Academy of Israel) runs a recreational program at the Canada Centre that is open to youngsters of all faiths. In 2014, it had an enrollment of 450 Jewish and Arab youngsters. In 2014, forty players were Alawites from Ghajar on the Lebanese border.

== Ice Hockey Federation of Israel ==
The Ice Hockey Federation of Israel is recognized as the governing body of Ice Hockey in Israel by the Ministry of Education's Sports Authority.

== Israeli League ==
The Israeli League is the top tier hockey league in Israel. It was founded in 1990 with 6 teams.

Currently (2019) the Senior-A top division consists of 12 teams, divided into upper and lower group, from 10 major clubs:

- Yahud
- Tel Mond
- Haifa Hawks
- HC Bat Yam
- Rishon Devils
- HC Metulla (CIHS)
- Dragons Nes Ziona
- Holon Ninjas
- Petah Tikva
- Gedera

The IcePeaks arena in Holon created a major impact on the number of senior teams in Israel.

== Israel national ice hockey team ==
The Israel national ice hockey team has been a member of the International Ice Hockey Federation since 1 May 1991. The men's team is currently ranked 34th, and the women's team is not ranked. As of April 2017 Israel had 901 total players: 345 Male, 513 Junior and 43 females. Additionally they have 29 referees and 4 indoor rinks.

The national team, in the 2013 IIHF Ice Hockey World Championship Division II Group B, won the gold medal. As a result, the team was promoted to Division II Group A. In 5 games played they were able to defeat China, Turkey, New Zealand and Bulgaria while suffering their only loss to Mexico.

== Maccabiah Games ==
In 1997, during the 15th Maccabiah Games Ice Hockey was included for the first time, with Team Canada winning the inaugural gold medal. Once again in 2013, Ice Hockey joined for the 19th Maccabiah Games as an official sport.

Funding was extremely low for the Ice Hockey team and the sport was nearly removed from the games. Owners of 6 NHL teams (Edmonton Oilers, Anaheim Ducks, Philadelphia Flyers, Toronto Maple Leafs, Florida Panthers and Tampa Bay Lightning) funded the sports, enabling it to officially join for the first time.

Several NHL team owners also helped fund the hockey program in the 20th Maccabiah games in 2017, in which three tournaments took place – an open tournament, a junior one (for players up to 18 years of age), and a senior one (for players 40 years of age and over). For the sake of the tournament, a temporary full-size rink was established at the Pais Arena basketball hall in Jerusalem. The capacity of the arena (10000 for hockey) and its proximity to population centers in Israel made the tournament an attraction for thousands of fans, with the final game of the open tournament, in which Canada beat the United States 7:2, attracting an attendance of 7000 and becoming the highest attended hockey game in history on Israeli soil.

== Rinks ==
Currently there are two main rinks in full-time ice hockey use in Israel. Canada Centre in Israel is the original and biggest ice hockey arena in Israel. In 2010 it was announced that Israel would be getting their second rink, in Eilat. The Ice Park & Mall Eilat offers a full ice rink on the main floor, along with other entertainment features, and a full mall on the upper level, but that rink is not equipped for hockey and hockey activity does not take place there. Additionally a third, smaller rink, is located in Ma'alot, and another one in Holon. The rink in Hollon which is a smaller rink is used constantly for the Leagues Games run by the Federation. An Olympic size rink is in the process of being built with a hope to open in 2023.There is another rink which opened in 2018 called OneIce which is situated in Tnuvot.

== Canadian Friends of Israel Hockey ==
The Canadian Friends of the Israel Ice Hockey Federation was founded in 1991 by David Lisbona and Larry Markowitz. After meeting immigrant and Canadian ex-pat Paul Shindman, the founder of the IIHFSA, Lisbona and Markowitz set up the Canadian Friends in order to provide skates and equipment, and help popularize the sport in Israel. It now focuses all of its efforts on the Canada-Israel Hockey School program. While it is based out of Montreal, there are other collection efforts throughout the country, primarily in Ottawa. The organization has an affiliation with the Hockey without Borders program

In December 2017, the organization collected and sent hundreds of jockstraps to Israel.

== See also ==
- Jews in Hockey
- Israel men's national junior ice hockey team
- Sports in Israel
