= 1994–95 Israeli Hockey League season =

Season of the Israeli Hockey League

The 1994–95 Israeli Hockey League season was the fourth season of Israel's hockey league. Five teams participated in the league, and HC Bat Yam won the championship.

== Regular season ==
| Pos | Team | Pld | W | D | L | GF | GA | GD | Pts |
|---|---|---|---|---|---|---|---|---|---|
| 1 | HC Bat Yam | 8 | 7 | 0 | 1 | 98 | 50 | +48 | 21 |
| 2 | Jerusalem Capitals | 8 | 6 | 0 | 2 | 66 | 48 | +18 | 18 |
| 3 | HC Haifa | 8 | 4 | 0 | 4 | 68 | 35 | +33 | 12 |
| 4 | HC Metulla | 8 | 3 | 0 | 5 | 38 | 64 | −26 | 9 |
| 5 | HC Tel Aviv | 8 | 0 | 0 | 8 | 32 | 108 | −76 | 0 |

== Playoffs ==
=== Semifinals ===
- HC Bat Yam - HC Metulla 13:5
- Jerusalem Capitals - HC Haifa 7:5

=== Final ===
- HC Bat Yam - Jerusalem Capitals 11:3
