= 1997–98 Israeli Hockey League season =

Season of the Israeli Hockey League

The 1997–98 Israeli Hockey League season was the seventh season of Israel's hockey league. Seven teams participated in the league, and HC Maccabi Amos Lod won the championship.

== Regular season ==
Pos	Team	Pld	GF	GA	GD	Pts
1	HC Maccabi Amos Lod	12	83	24	+59	22
2	HC Metulla	12	54	30	+24	17
3	HC Haifa	12	56	29	+27	16
4	HC Bat Yam	12	32	43	−11	10
5	Lions Jerusalem	12	37	56	−19	10
6	HC Hullon	12	26	59	−33	5
7	HC Ramat Gan	12	25	68	−43	2

== Playoffs ==
=== Semifinals ===
- HC Maccabi Amos Lod - HC Bat Yam 4:2/5:3
- HC Haifa - HC Metulla 3:3/4:6

=== Final ===
- HC Maccabi Amos Lod - HC Metulla 7:6/8:4
