= Israel men's national under-18 ice hockey team =

The Israel men's national under-18 ice hockey team is the men's national under-18 ice hockey team of Israel. The team is controlled by the Ice Hockey Federation of Israel, a member of the International Ice Hockey Federation. The team represents Israel at the IIHF World U18 Championships.

== International competitions ==
=== IIHF World U18 Championships ===
- 1999: 4th in Division II Europe
- 2000: 5th in Division II Europe
- 2001: 8th in Division III
- 2002: Did not participate
- 2003: 4th in Division III Group B
- 2004: 5th in Division III
- 2005: 3rd in Division III
- 2006: 2nd in Division III
- 2007: 5th in Division II Group A
- 2008: 6th in Division II Group B
- 2009: Did not participate
- 2010: 4th in Division III Group B
- 2011: 4th in Division III Group B
- 2012: Did not participate
- 2013: 1st in Division III Group B(Promoted to Division III Group A)
- 2014: 2nd in Division III Group A
- 2015: 5th in Division III Group A
- 2016: 4th in Division III Group A
- 2017: 2nd in Division III Group A
- 2018: 4th in Division III Group A
- 2019: 2nd in Division III Group A
- 2020: Cancelled due to the COVID-19 pandemic
- 2021: Cancelled due to the COVID-19 pandemic
- 2022: 4th in Division III Group A
- 2023: 1st in Division III Group A(Promoted to Division II Group B)
- 2024: 6th in Division II Group B(Relegated to Division III Group A)
- 2025: 3rd in Division III Group A
- 2026: 3rd in Division III Group A

== Roster ==
From the 2014 IIHF World U18 Championships

#	Name	Pos	Date of birth	Club
7	Roey Aharonovich	F	7 July 1996	(United States) Rice Memorial HS
8	Tomer Bash	F	21 February 1998	(Israel) HC Metulla
19	Uri Benhar	F	7 April 1998	(Israel) HC Maalot
14	Dani Boudnikov (A)	F	6 June 1998	(Israel) HC Maalot
5	Ilya Buhnik	D	17 October 1997	(Israel) HC Metulla
15	Gitai Chernin	D	26 April 1997	(Israel) HC Maalot
9	Uval Gindi (A)	D	24 June 1996	(Israel) Ness Ziona Dragons
20	Maxim Gokhberg	G	20 July 1996	(Israel) Bat Yam Icebergs
16	Ori Kafri	D	13 March 1997	(Israel) Kfar Saba Horses
22	Ariel Kapulkin	F	19 September 1998	(Canada) CIH Academy Rockland
3	Amit Lazmi	D	21 December 1996	(Israel) HC Metulla
4	Ilya Levit	F	11 March 1998	(Israel) HC Metulla
6	Denis Kozev	D	8 September 1998	(Israel) HC Maalot
11	Shai Maaravi (C)	D	29 October 1996	(Israel) HC Metulla
25	Yoav Regev	G	6 January 1997	(Israel) HC Metulla
18	Mark Revniaga	F	28 September 1998	(Israel) HC Maalot
17	Ilya Spektor	F	10 April 1996	(Israel) Kfar Saba Horses
2	May Tam	D	28 April 1996	(Israel) Kfar Saba Horses
23	Dotan Tobol	F	7 April 1998	(Israel) HC Metulla
24	Bar Zimmerman	F	31 July 1996	(Israel) Rishon Devils
