= Arseny Bondarev =

Russian ice hockey player (born 1985)

- Born: 9 April 1985 (age 41) Tomichi, Russia
- Height: 6 ft 0 in (183 cm)
- Weight: 187 lb (85 kg; 13 st 5 lb)
- Position: Left Wing
- Shot: Left
- Played for: Lokomotiv Yaroslavl; Amur Khabarovsk; Krylya Sovetov Moscow; HC MVD; Kristall Elektrostal; Dizel Penza; HK Gomel; Molot-Prikamie Perm; Kristall Saratov; HC Ryazan; Sokol Krasnoyarsk
- NHL draft: 292nd overall, 2003; New Jersey Devils
- Playing career: 2003–2019

Arseny Sergeyevich Bondarev (Russian: Арсений Серге́евич Бондарев; born 9 April 1985) is a Russian former professional ice hockey player. Bondarev was drafted by the New Jersey Devils in the 9th round, 292nd overall in the 2003 NHL entry draft.

== Career ==
Bondarev began his career with Lokomotiv Yaroslavl-2 in the Pervaya Liga in 2001. He then went over to Amur Khabarovsk-2 in 2004, and played 3 games for the second team in the Pervaya Liga, and 33 games with the top team in the Vysshaya Liga. He continued playing for Khabarovsk until he joined Krylya Sovetov Moscow for the 2006–07 season.

Bondarev played 5 games for the second team in the Pervaya Liga, and 15 games for the top team in the Russian Superleague. His stay with Krylya only lasted one year, and he joined HC MVD for the 2007–08 season. Bondarev played 36 games in the Russian Superleague for MVD in 2007–08. For 2008–09, Bondarev played 13 games for HC MVD-2 in the Pervaya Liga, before going to Kristall Elektrostal in the Vysshaya Liga.

After half a season with Elektrostal, he joined Dizel Penza, and played 51 games with them in 2009–10. For 2010–11, Bondarev joined HC Gomel of the Belarusian Extraliga, and played in 35 games. He returned to Russia for the 2011–12 season, and joined Molot-Prikamie Perm in the Vysshaya Liga. He then spent a season playing for Kristall Saratov in 2013-14, followed by a stint with HC Ryazan in 2014-15 and finally Sokol Krasnoyarsk in 2015-16.

== Career statistics ==
=== Regular season and playoffs ===
			Regular season					Playoffs
Season	Team	League	GP	G	A	Pts	PIM	GP	G	A	Pts	PIM
2001–02	Lokomotiv–2 Yaroslavl	RUS.3	11	0	1	1	4	—	—	—	—	—
2002–03	Lokomotiv–2 Yaroslavl	RUS.3	32	5	9	14	16	—	—	—	—	—
2003–04	Lokomotiv–2 Yaroslavl	RUS.3	60	15	10	25	98	—	—	—	—	—
2004–05	Golden Amur	ALH	2	0	0	0	0	—	—	—	—	—
2004–05	Amur Khabarovsk	RUS.2	33	5	9	14	32	6	0	2	2	6
2004–05	Amur–2 Khabarovsk	RUS.3	3	4	1	5	24	—	—	—	—	—
2005–06	Amur Khabarovsk	RUS.2	42	10	11	21	42	9	0	3	3	37
2005–06	Amur–2 Khabarovsk	RUS.3	2	0	0	0	20	—	—	—	—	—
2006–07	Krylia Sovetov Moscow	RSL	15	1	3	4	16	—	—	—	—	—
2006–07	Krylia Sovetov–2 Moscow	RUS.3	6	3	3	6	14	—	—	—	—	—
2006–07	Metallurg–2 Novokuznetsk	RUS.3	9	3	3	6	8	—	—	—	—	—
2007–08	HC MVD	RSL	36	4	4	8	32	2	0	0	0	4
2007–08	HC–2 MVD	RUS.3	6	9	3	12	43	—	—	—	—	—
2008–09	Kristall Elektrostal	RUS.2	49	12	21	33	144	—	—	—	—	—
2008–09	HC–2 MVD	RUS.3	13	16	3	19	14	4	4	6	10	8
2009–10	Dizel Penza	RUS.2	51	20	14	34	44	12	3	3	6	2
2010–11	HK Gomel	BLR	35	9	17	26	64	4	3	2	5	4
2011–12	Molot Perm	VHL	47	19	14	33	40	3	0	1	1	0
2012–13	Sokil Kyiv	UKR	15	4	6	10	8	—	—	—	—	—
2012–13	Molot Perm	VHL	25	2	4	6	20	6	0	1	1	0
2013–14	Kristall Saratov	VHL	38	4	8	12	72	—	—	—	—	—
2014–15	HC Ryazan	VHL	45	4	7	11	20	2	0	0	0	6
2015–16	Sokol Krasnoyarsk	VHL	15	2	4	6	2	—	—	—	—	—
2016–17	Bisons de Neuilly–sur–Marne	FRA.2	8	3	0	3	12	—	—	—	—	—
2017–18	Rishon Devils	ISR	8	15	19	34	0	2	4	0	4	0
2018–19	Rishon Devils	ISR	2	4	2	6	0	—	—	—	—	—
RUS.2 & VHL totals			345	78	92	170	420	38	3	10	13	51
RSL totals			51	5	7	12	48	2	0	0	0	4

=== International ===
Year	Team	Event	GP	G	A	Pts	PIM
2002	Russia	U18
Junior totals
