= 2009–10 Israeli Hockey League season =

Season of the Israeli Hockey League

The 2009–10 Israeli Hockey League season was the 19th season of Israel's hockey league. HC Ma'alot won their fourth Israeli championship.

== Final Tournament ==
3rd place

- HC Herzlia - HC Metulla 7:1

Final

- HC Ma’alot - HC Bat-Yam 2:0
