= Israel men's national junior ice hockey team =

Israel
- Association: Ice Hockey Federation of Israel
- Head coach: Kirill Polozov
- Assistants: Michail Kozhevnikov; Nikita Lukin
- Top scorer: Mike Levin (21 games 37+26); Mark Revniaga (16 games 24+9)
- Team colors
- IIHF code: ISR

First international
- Estonia 12 – 3 Israel (Sofia, Bulgaria; 1996–1997)

Biggest win
- Israel 17 – 0 South Africa (Mexico City, Mexico; 19 January 2016)

Biggest defeat
- Croatia 16 – 1 Israel (Gangneung, South Korea; 28 January 2020)

IIHF World Junior Championship
- Appearances: 11 (first in 1997)
- Best result: 30th (2025)

International record (W–L–T)
- 31–24–0

The Israel men's national under 20 ice hockey team is the national under-20 ice hockey team of Israel. The team is controlled by the Ice Hockey Federation of Israel, a member of the International Ice Hockey Federation. Israel first played at the 1997 World Junior Championships, but did not return until 2016.

== History ==
Israel played its first U20 game during the 1997 World Junior Ice Hockey Championships. They were placed in Pool D with the games being held in Sofia, Bulgaria. Israel's first game was against Estonia which they lost 12–3. The game is also recorded as Israel's largest ever loss. Within Pool D Israel was drawn into a preliminary group against Estonia, South Africa, and Yugoslavia. They finished the preliminary round in third place after managing to win their game against South Africa. Based on the positions in the preliminary round the teams were then drawn into placement games against the other preliminary group. Israel was drawn into the placement game for fifth place against the hosts Bulgaria. They won the game 7–3, which is also their largest ever win in international participation.

After leaving the U20 level for several years, the team returned to the tournament for 2016. Playing in Division III, the lowest tier, they finished fourth out of the seven teams. The following year Israel finished fifth. They won the 2018 tournament, and were promoted to Division IIB for 2019. A fifth-place finish ensured they stayed in Division IIB for 2020.

In the first match of the 2025 tournament, an incident occurred in which the Australian team refused to respect the Israeli national anthem and did not shake hands with the Israeli players. After wins in the first two matches against Australia and Belgium, Israel lost to Serbia and the eventual tournament winners Spain. In the last round, Israel defeated Iceland and took second place in the group. This was Israel's best result through 10 World Championship tournaments. Mike Levin, who plays for the Niagara IceDogs in the OHL, was the top scorer of the tournament (7 goals, 4 assists), and was recognized as the best player on the team. Samson Goldstein placed second in scorers (3 goals, 6 assists) and was recognized as the best forward of the tournament.

== International competitions ==
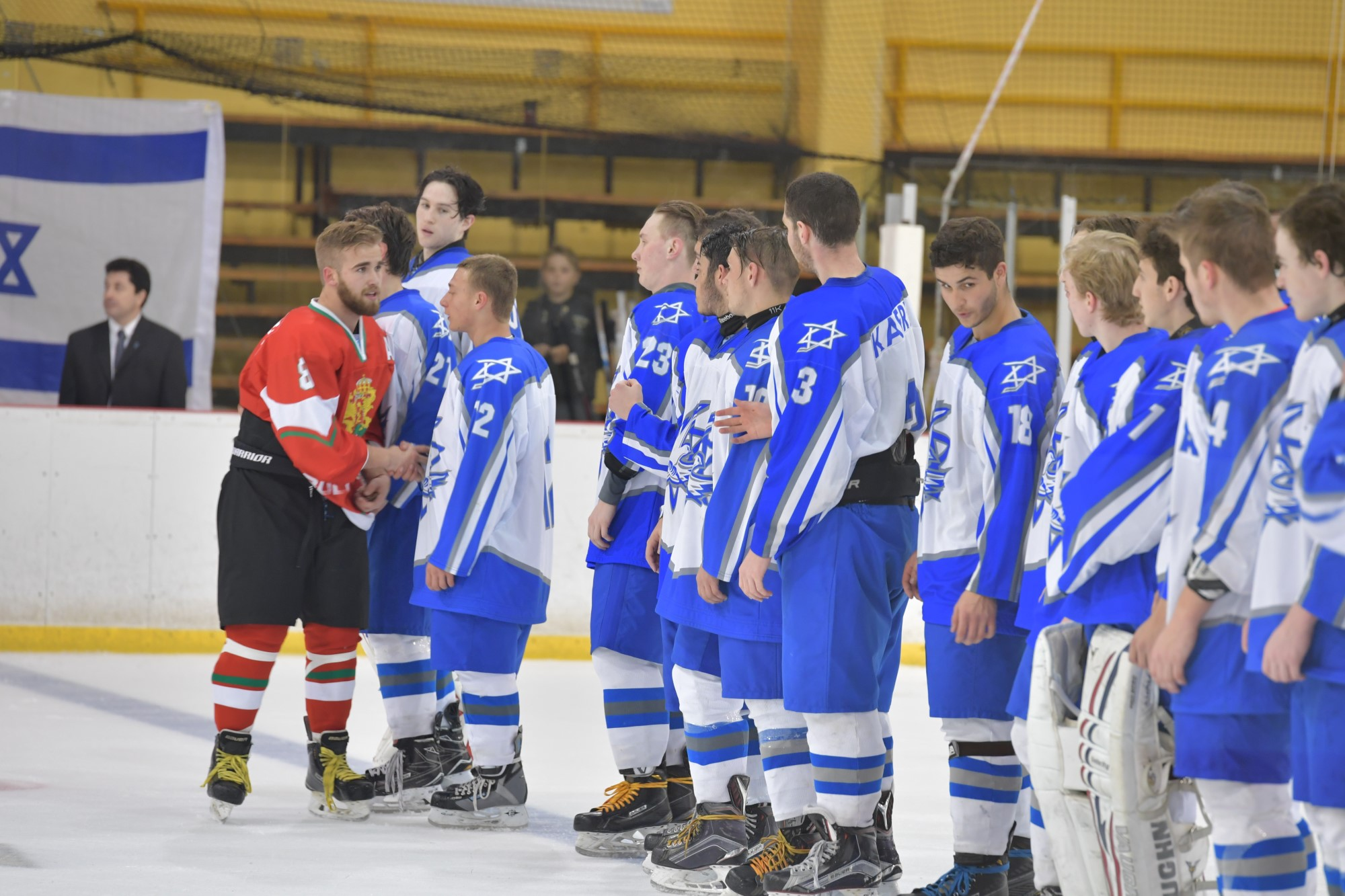
The Israeli national junior team at the 2017 World Junior Championship Division III.

- 1997 – 31st overall (5th place in Pool D)
- 1998–2015 – Did not participate
- 2016 – 38th overall (4th in Division III)
- 2017 – 39th overall (5th in Division III)
- 2018 – 35th overall (1st in Division III)
- 2019 – 33rd overall (5th in Division IIB)
- 2020 – 34th overall (6th in Division IIB)
- 2021 – Cancelled due to COVID-19 pandemic
- 2022 – 38th overall (4th in Division III)
- 2023 – 36th overall (2nd in Division III)
- 2024 – 35th overall (1st in Division IIIA)
- 2025 – 30th overall (2nd in Division IIB)
- 2026 – 31st overall (3rd in Division IIB)

== See also ==
- Ice hockey in Israel
- Israel national ice hockey team
- Israeli League (ice hockey)
