= 2017–18 Israeli Hockey League season =

Season of the Israeli Hockey League

2017–18 Israeli League season
- League: (Israel) Israeli League
- Sport: Ice Hockey
- Duration: 16 October 2017 – 26 May 2018
- Number of teams: 10

Regular season
- Season champions: HC Bat Yam

Playoffs

Finals
- Champions: HC Bat Yam
- Runners-up: CIHS

Top Israeli League seasons
- ← 2016/17 2018/19 →

The 2017–18 Israeli League season will be the 27th season of ice hockey in Israel and 6th season of Top League. Rishon Devils are the current champions, after winning the 2016-17 Israeli Hockey League season. Holon Ninjas were promoted from the second division and are playing in the top division of Israel Hockey for the very first time.

== Teams ==
Teams of the 2017–18 Top Israeli League

Team	City	Arena	Capacity
Rishon Devils	Rishon LeZion	Ice Peaks	500
Rishon-2	Rishon LeZion	Ice Peaks	500
CIHS	Metulla	Canada Center	800
Monfort	Ma'alot	Canada Center	800
Haifa Hawks	Haifa	Canada Center	800
HC Bat Yam	Bat Yam	Ice Peaks	500
Horses	Kfar Saba	Ice Peaks	500
Dragons	Nes Ziona	Ice Peaks	500
Hitmen	Raanana	Ice Peaks	500
Ninjas	Holon	Ice Peaks	500

== Regular season ==
=== Standings ===
Pos	Team	Pld	W	OTW	OTL	L	GF	GA	GD	Pts
1	HC Bat Yam	9	8	0	0	1	74	28	+46	24
2	Rishon Devils	9	8	0	0	1	74	21	+53	24
3	CIHS Metula	9	7	0	0	2	62	22	+40	21
4	Horses Kfar Saba	9	7	0	0	2	67	25	+42	21
5	Monfort Ma'alot	9	5	0	0	4	32	30	+2	15
6	Holon Ninjas	9	4	0	0	5	34	43	−9	12
7	Nes Ziona Dragons	9	3	0	0	6	30	52	−22	9
8	Ra'anana Hitmen	9	2	0	0	7	24	53	−29	6
9	Rishon-2	9	1	0	0	8	10	78	−68	3
10	Haifa Hawks	9	0	0	0	9	5	60	−55	0

=== Table ===
Home \ Away	RIS	CHS	HOR	HIT	MON	BTY	DRA	RS2	HAW	NIN
Rishon Devils		6–3	9–3	14–0	5–0 (F)	6–7	9–2	10–2	8–2	7–2
CIHS	3–6		5–1	7–1	5–2	6–8	7–3	13–0	8–0	8–1
Horses Kfar Saba	3–9	1–5		5–0 (F)	7–1	6–2	14–6	13–2	13–0	5–0
Ra'anana Hitmen	0–14	1–7	0–5 (F)		2–8	5–6	2–4	8–0	3–1	3–8
Monfort Ma'alot	0–5 (F)	2–5	1–7	8–2		0–7	6–1	5–0	4–0	6–3
HC Bat Yam	7–6	8–6	2–6	6–5	7–0		8–1	14–1	10–0	12–3
Nes Ziona Dragons	2–9	3–7	6–14	4–2	1–6	1–8		6–1	5–0	2–5
Rishon-2	2–10	0–13	2–13	0–8	0–5	1–14	1–6		4–2	0–7
Haifa Hawks	2–8	0–8	0–13	1–3	0–4	0–10	0–5	2–4		0–5
Holon Ninjas	2–7	1–8	0–5	8–3	3–6	3–12	5–2	7–0	5–0	

== Play-offs ==
Quarterfinals
1	HC Bat Yam	7
8	Ra'anana Hitmen	1
2	Rishon Devils	14
7	Nes Ziona Dragons	1
3	CIHS	9
6	Holon Ninjas	0
4	Horses Kfar Saba	10
5	Monfort Ma'alot	3

Semifinals
3	CIHS	6 (P. Sh.)
2	Rishon Devils	5
1	HC Bat Yam	9
4	Horses Kfar Saba	4

Finals
1	HC Bat Yam	5
3	CIHS	2
Third place
2	Rishon Devils	5 (F)
4	Horses Kfar Saba	0

== Player statistics ==
=== Scoring leaders ===
The following players led the league in regular season and play-offs points at the conclusion of games played on Mai 29, 2018.

Player	Team	Regular Season				Play-Off				TOTAL			
Player	Team	GP	G	A	Pts	GP	G	A	Pts	GP	G	A	Pts
Artiom Verny	HC Bat Yam	9	20	17	37	3	3	9	12	12	23	26	49
Joshua Greenberg	HC Bat Yam	9	21	15	36	3	1	6	7	12	22	21	43
Viktor Vorobjev	Horses	7	11	24	35	2	1	4	5	9	12	28	40
Arseniy Bondarev	Rishon Devils	8	15	19	34	2	4	0	4	10	19	19	38
Mikhael Zishe Horowitz	CIHS	9	15	12	27	3	3	0	3	12	18	12	30
Ilia Spektor	Horses	8	18	8	26	2	7	2	9	10	25	10	35
Michael Mazeika	CIHS	9	15	10	25	3	2	4	6	12	17	14	31
Ilia Dinov	Rishon Devils	9	11	10	21	2	3	2	5	11	14	12	26
Evgeni Mokhov	Holon Ninjas	9	10	7	17	1	0	0	0	10	10	7	17
Evgeni Margoulis	Rishon Devils	9	7	9	16	2	0	2	2	11	7	11	18
Itay Shalev Ben Tov	Monfort Ma'alot	6	11	4	15	1	0	1	1	7	11	5	16
Evgeni Kniter	CIHS	9	3	11	14	3	1	4	5	12	4	15	19
Evgueni Nataltchenko	HC Bat Yam	9	9	5	14	3	3	1	4	12	12	6	18
Maias Wadi Sabag	CIHS	9	5	8	13	3	1	1	2	12	6	9	15
Ostap Rodichev	HC Bat Yam	9	8	4	12	2	0	0	0	11	8	4	12
Anton Krivobrukhov	Rishon Devils	9	9	3	12	2	3	0	3	11	12	3	15
Nisim Botbol Rosental	HC Bat Yam	9	1	10	11	3	0	1	1	12	1	11	12
Daniel Haim Lonkry	CIHS	8	9	2	11	3	4	2	6	11	13	4	17
Nikolay Kolomiza	Dragons	9	8	3	11	1	1	0	1	10	9	3	12
Michail Kozhevnikov	HC Bat Yam	3	3	7	10	3	2	1	3	6	5	8	13
Aviv Milner	HC Bat Yam	2	0	0	0	3	7	5	12	5	3	7	12
Evgenij Kozhevnikov	HC Bat Yam	2	2	4	6	2	4	2	6	4	6	6	12
Ori Kafri	Horses	7	4	2	6	2	2	3	5	9	6	5	11
