= 1993–94 Israeli Hockey League season =

Season of the Israeli Hockey League

The 1993–94 Israeli Hockey League season was the third season of Israel's hockey league. Four teams participated in the league, and HC Haifa won the championship.

== Regular season ==
Pos	Team
1	HC Haifa
2	HC Bat Yam
3	HC Jerusalem
4	HC Ramat Gan

== Awards ==
Award	Player	Team
Top Goaltender	Boris Amromin	HC Haifa
Top Defenceman	Ran Oz	HC Ramat Gan
Top Forward	Jenya Feldman	HC Haifa
