= 2007–08 Israeli Hockey League season =

Season of the Israeli Hockey League

The 2007–08 Israeli Hockey League season was the 17th season of Israel's hockey league. The Haifa Hawks won their third consecutive Israeli championship.
