= 2017 World Junior Ice Hockey Championships – Division III =

2017 IIHF U20 World Championship Division III

Tournament details
- Host country: New Zealand
- Venue: 1 (in 1 host city)
- Dates: 16–22 January 2017
- Teams: 8

Tournament statistics
- Games played: 20
- Goals scored: 148 (7.4 per game)
- Attendance: 3,105 (155 per game)
- Scoring leader: (China) Rudi Ying (19 points)

Official website
- www.iihf.com

The 2017 World Junior Ice Hockey Championship Division III was an international ice hockey tournament organized by the International Ice Hockey Federation. It was played in Dunedin, New Zealand, from 16 to 22 January 2017. Division III represents the sixth tier of the World Junior Ice Hockey Championships. The winners – Turkey – were promoted to Division II B for the 2018 tournament. Chinese Taipei returned after a five-year absence. With an increase of teams for 2018, the two bottom-placed teams, South Africa and Chinese Taipei, were afterwards moved to a Division III Qualification tournament.

== Participating teams ==
Team	Qualification
China	placed 6th in Division II B last year and were relegated
Bulgaria	placed 2nd in Division III last year
New Zealand	hosts; placed 3rd in Division III last year
Israel	placed 4th in Division III last year
Iceland	placed 5th in Division III last year
Turkey	placed 6th in Division III last year
South Africa	placed 7th in Division III last year
Chinese Taipei	last participated in 2011

== Preliminary round ==
=== Format ===
The best two ranked teams from each group of the preliminary round advance to the semi-finals, while the bottom two teams from both groups advance to the 5th–8th place playoffs.

All times are local. (New Zealand Daylight Time – UTC+13)

=== Group A ===
Pos	Team	Pld	W	OTW	OTL	L	GF	GA	GD	Pts	Qualification
1	China	3	3	0	0	0	19	8	+11	9	Semifinals
2	Iceland	3	2	0	0	1	11	6	+5	6	Semifinals
3	Israel	3	1	0	0	2	7	9	−2	3	5th–8th place playoffs
4	Chinese Taipei	3	0	0	0	3	5	19	−14	0	5th–8th place playoffs

Source: IIHF

16 January 2017; 10:00	China	9–3 (5–2, 3–0, 1–1)	Chinese Taipei	Dunedin Ice Stadium; Attendance: 100

Game reference

Ren Mingwei
Goalies
He Wei-chih
Huang Sheng-chun
Referee:
(Russia) Sergey Morozov
Linesmen:
(Japan) Jinya Chiba
(France) Frederic Peuriere

Ying – 02:11	1–0
	1–1	02:11 – Yu
Ma (Huang) – 08:19	2–1
Ying (Li) – 13:21	3–1
Li – 15:03	4–1
Huang (Zuo) (SH) – 17:55	5–1
	5–2	18:24 – Chiang (Chang C.)
Deng (Li, Ying) (PP) – 21:07	6–2
Deng (SH) – 27:13	7–2
Ying (Li) – 37:51	8–2
	8–3	50:17 – Chiang (Chang C.) (PP)
Li (Ying) (SH) – 52:30	9–3

16 min
Penalties
4 min
53
Shots
17

16 January 2017; 17:00	Israel	0–3 (0–1, 0–2, 0–0)	Iceland	Dunedin Ice Stadium; Attendance: 100

Game reference

Raz Werner
Goalies
Maksymilian Mojzyszek
Referee:
(Switzerland) Michael Weber
Linesmen:
(New Zealand) Aaron Clough
(Japan) Naoki Sawayama

0–1	05:48 – Johannsson (Oskarsson, Maack)
0–2	31:38 – Sigrunarson (Olafsson, Induss) (PP)
0–3	31:44 – Orongan (Kristinsson, Kristveigarson)

8 min
Penalties
8 min
18
Shots
33

17 January 2017; 10:00	Israel	3–0 (0–0, 2–0, 1–0)	Chinese Taipei	Dunedin Ice Stadium; Attendance: 100

Game reference

Raz Werner
Goalies
Huang Sheng-chun
Referee:
(Russia) Sergey Morozov
Linesmen:
(United Kingdom) Oliver Finch
(South Korea) Park Jae-hyung

Merkulov (Aharonovich, Mostovoy) – 27:58	1–0
Levin (Halpert, Ignatovich) – 36:00	2–0
Kapulkin (PP) – 46:47	3–0

6 min
Penalties
6 min
37
Shots
26

17 January 2017; 17:00	Iceland	1–4 (1–1, 0–0, 0–3)	China	Dunedin Ice Stadium; Attendance: 100

Game reference

Maksymillian Mojzyszek
Arnar Hjaltested
Goalies
Ren Mingwei
Referee:
(United States) Peter Tarnaris
Linesmen:
(United Kingdom) Danny Beresford
(Australia) Fraser Ohlson

Induss (J. Arnason) (PP) – 04:48	1–0
	1–1	16:34 – Gao (Ying)
	1–2	42:55 – Li (Ying, Huang)
	1–3	58:52 – Ying (Huang) (PP)
	1–4	59:12 – Li (Deng, Ying)

18 min
Penalties
18 min
28
Shots
35

19 January 2017; 10:00	Chinese Taipei	2–7 (0–2, 1–5, 1–0)	Iceland	Dunedin Ice Stadium; Attendance: 100

Game reference

Huang Sheng-chun – Out 27:17
Wei-Chih-he – In 27:17
Goalies
Arnar Hjaltested
Referee:
(Switzerland) Michael Weber
Linesmen:
(Japan) Jinya Chiba
(France) Frederic Peuriere

	0–1	03:37 – Induss (J. Arnason, V. Arason) (SH)
	0–2	12:36 – J. Arnason (Olafsson, Sigrunarson)
	0–3	20:43 – Induss (Sigrunarson, Olafsson)
	0–4	24:51 – Olafsson (Sigrunarson, Thorsteinsson)
	0–5	27:17 – Maack (Gunnlaugsson, Oskarsson
	0–6	28:25 – Sigrunarson (Induss, Olafsson)
Huang P. (Tang, Pan) – 34:04	1–6
	1–7	38:21 – Kristveigarson (A. Orongan) (PP)
Hsu (Pan, Huang P.) – 58:03	2–7

14 min
Penalties
14 min
18
Shots
60

19 January 2017; 17:00	China	6–4 (3–1, 1–1, 2–2)	Israel	Dunedin Ice Stadium; Attendance: 100

Game reference

Ren Mingwei
Wang Yupeng
Goalies
Raz Werner
Referee:
(New Zealand) Peter Haxell
Linesmen:
(Finland) Lauri Nikulainen
(Japan) Naoki Sawayama

	0–1	07:40 – Revniaga
Guo J. (Zuo, Gao) – 07:50	1–1
Huang (Wang C., Guo J.) (PP) – 09:43	2–1
Zhang (Wu, Deng) (PP) – 15:36	3–1
Wu (Xie, Ma) – 24:34	4–1
	4–2	29:11 – Sever (Hoffman) (PP)
Huang (Zuo, Guo J.) (PP) – 48:23	5–2
Ying (Zhang, Deng) – 54:48	6–2
	6–3	56:48 – Ignatovich (Kapulkin)
	6–4	59:45 – Ignatovich (Kapulkin, Hoffman)

10 min
Penalties
10 min
47
Shots
20

=== Group B ===
Pos	Team	Pld	W	OTW	OTL	L	GF	GA	GD	Pts	Qualification
1	Turkey	3	3	0	0	0	20	5	+15	9	Semifinals
2	New Zealand	3	2	0	0	1	12	12	0	6	Semifinals
3	Bulgaria	3	1	0	0	2	10	15	−5	3	5th–8th place playoffs
4	South Africa	3	0	0	0	3	4	14	−10	0	5th–8th place playoffs

Source: IIHF

16 January 2017; 13:30	Bulgaria	5–2 (2–1, 1–1, 2–0)	South Africa	Dunedin Ice Stadium; Attendance: 100

Game reference

Dimitar Dimitrov
Goalies
Aslam Khan
Referee:
(Japan) Shingo Ikegami
Linesmen:
(United Kingdom) Oliver Finch
(South Korea) Park Jae-hyung

Vachkov (M. Vasilev) – 01:02	1–0
M. Vasilev (Vachkov) – 03:47	2–0
	2–1	15:16 – Beukes (Venter) (PP2)
	2–2	29:46 – Ruthven (Bremner, Compton)
Dilkov (T. Georgiev, M. Vasilev) (PP) – 31:15	3–2
M. Vasilev (T. Georgiev) – 53:44	4–2
Blagoev (Genkov) (SH, ENG) – 58:47	5–2

14 min
Penalties
18 min
37
Shots
23

16 January 2017; 20:30	New Zealand	4–6 (1–3, 1–2, 2–1)	Turkey	Dunedin Ice Stadium; Attendance: 200

Game reference

James Moore (out 07:50)
Taylor Goodall (in 07:50)
Goalies
Tolga Bozaci
Referee:
(United States) Peter Tarnaris
Linesmen:
(Finland) Lauri Nikulainen
(Australia) Fraser Ohlson

	0–1	02:18 – H. Salt (Bakal) (SH)
	0–2	05:42 – H. Salt (Bakal) (PP)
	0–3	07:50 – Bingol (Savas)
Rooney (S. Brown, Vortanov) – 19:25	1–3
Vortanov (Harford) – 20:34	2–3
	2–4	34:26 Taygar (Y. Kars)
	2–5	37:04 – H. Salt (Savas)
	2–6	46:59 – H. Salt (Bakal, Y. Kars)(PP)
Harford – 48:37	3–6
Vortanov (Rooney, S. Brown) – 54:25	4–6

8 min
Penalties
4 min
13
Shots
21

17 January 2017; 13:30	Turkey	8–1 (2–0, 2–0, 4–1)	Bulgaria	Dunedin Ice Stadium; Attendance: 100

Game reference

Tolga Bozaci
Goalies
Dimitar Dimitrov
Referee:
(New Zealand) Peter Haxell
Linesmen:
(New Zealand) Aaron Clough
(Japan) Naoki Sawayama

Kavaz (Savas, Bingol) – 15:26	1–0
Bingol (Kavaz, Faner) (PP) – 18:23	2–0
Bakal (SH) – 24:52	3–0
H. Salt (Taygar, Bakal) – 36:18	4–0
Kavaz (K. Salt) (PP) – 50:18	5–0
Y. Kars (Savas) (PP) – 50:34	6–0
Bingol (H. Secer, H. Salt) – 52:10	7–0
	7–1	55:30 – Ivanov (I. Gerogiev)
Kavaz (PP) – 58:39	8–1

12 min
Penalties
20 min
54
Shots
18

17 January 2017; 20:30	New Zealand	3–2 (2–2, 0–0, 1–0)	South Africa	Dunedin Ice Stadium; Attendance: 200

Game reference

Tyler Goodall
Goalies
Ryan Boyd
Referee:
(Switzerland) Michael Weber
Linesmen:
(Japan) Jinya Chiba
(France) Frederic Peuriere

Vortanov – 00:52	1–0
Rooney (S. Brown) – 05:44	2–0
	2–1	13:55 – L. Vivier (Compton, Bremner)
	2–2	15:05 – De Jager (Britz, Patrick)
Vortanov (Fraser) – 56:12	3–2

8 min
Penalties
31 min
41
Shots
19

19 January 2017; 13:30	South Africa	0–6 (0–1, 0–2, 0–3)	Turkey	Dunedin Ice Stadium; Attendance: 100

Game reference

Aslam Khan
Goalies
Muhammed Karagul
Referee:
(Japan) Shingo Ikegami
Linesmen:
(United Kingdom) Oliver Finch
(South Korea) Park Jae-hyung

0–1	07:05 – E. Secer
0–2	27:55 – O. Kars (Y. Kars)
0–3	31:19 – Kavaz (Y. Kars)
0–4	44:32 – Faner (H. Secer) (PP)
0–5	53:08 – O. Kars (K. Salt) (PP)
0–6	59L02 – Bingol (O. Kars)

16 min
Penalties
6 min
10
Shots
55

19 January 2017; 20:30	Bulgaria	4–5 (0–3, 3–0, 1–2)	New Zealand	Dunedin Ice Stadium; Attendance: 230

Game reference

Dimitar Dimitrov
Goalies
Taylor Goodall
Referee:
(Russia) Sergey Morozov
Linesmen:
(United Kingdom) Danny Beresford
(Australia) Fraser Ohlson

	0–1	03:29 – Rooney (S. Brown)
	0–2	13:01 – Egan
	0–3	18:06 – Rooney (S. Brown) (PP2)
Dilkov (T. Georgiev) (PP) – 20:55	1–3
Gatchev (Genkov) (PP) – 24:52	2–3
Gatchev (T. Georgiev) (PP) – 27:34	3–3
Blagoev (T. Georgiev) – 48:02	4–3
	4–4	56:50 – Rooney
	4–5	59:35 – Vortanov (S. Brown) (PP2)

67 min
Penalties
34 min
26
Shots
46

== 5th–8th place playoffs ==
=== Bracket ===
5th–8th place semifinals
A3	Israel	9
B4	South Africa	0
B3	Bulgaria	6
A4	Chinese Taipei	1

5th place match
A3	Israel	3
B3	Bulgaria	2
7th place match
B4	South Africa	1
A4	Chinese Taipei	7

=== 5th–8th place semifinals ===
21 January 2017; 10:00	Israel	9–0 (0–0, 5–0, 4–0)	South Africa	Dunedin Ice Stadium; Attendance: 100

Game reference

Raz Werner
Yoav Regev
Goalies
Ryan Boyd
Aslam Khan
Referee:
(New Zealand) Peter Haxell
Linesmen:
(Japan) Jinya Chiba
(United Kingdom) Oliver Finch

Kapulkin (Ignatovich, Hoffman) – 20:37	1–0
Sever (Avraham, Revniaga) – 24:00	2–0
Ignatovich (Kapulkin, Merkulov) – 24:49	3–0
Aharonovich (Avraham, Kozev) (PP) – 31:04	4–0
Kapulkin (Ignatovich, Kafri) – 39:41	5–0
Revniaga – 44:16	6–0
Mostovoy (Avraham, Sever) – 52:23	7–0
Levin (Haver, Halpert) – 56:36	8–0
Revniaga (Kapulkin, Hoffman) (PP) – 59:48	9–0

8 min
Penalties
6 min
47
Shots
13

21 January 2017; 13:30	Bulgaria	6–1 (3–0, 2–0, 1–1)	Chinese Taipei	Dunedin Ice Stadium; Attendance: 100

Game reference

Dimitar Dimitrov
Goalies
He Wei-chih
Huang Sheng-chun
Referee:
(Japan) Shingo Ikegami
Linesmen:
(United Kingdom) Danny Beresford
(Australia) Fraser Ohlson

M. Vasilev (Vachkov, Gatchev) – 03:20	1–0
M. Vasilev (Dilkov, I. Georgiev) – 05:09	2–0
Dilkov (M. Vasilev, Gatchev) – 05:23	3–0
Gatchev (Blagoev) – 35:31	4–0
I. Georgiev (Dikov) – 36:12	5–0
	5–1	48:14 – Pan (Chang C.)
Blagoev (Dikov) – 59:08	6–1

16 min
Penalties
4 min
40
Shots
36

=== 7th place game ===
22 January 2017; 10:00	South Africa	1–7 (0–2, 1–2, 0–3)	Chinese Taipei	Dunedin Ice Stadium; Attendance: 100

Game reference

Aslam Khan
Goalies
Huang Sheng-chun
He Wei-chih
Referee:
Peter Tarnaris (United States)
Linesmen:
Fraser Ohlson (Australia)
Frederic Peuriere (France)

	0–1	01:40 – Lo (Tang)
	0–2	08:51 – Chen K. (Chiang) (PP)
	0–3	28:42 – Hsu (Huang P.)
Bremner (Husselman) (PP) – 33:10	1–3
	1–4	33:18 – Chen K.
	1–5	40:17 – Chang H. (Huang P.)
	1–6	46:31 – Hsu (Lu)
	1–7	54:11 – Hsu (Pan, Huang P.) (PP)

22 min
Penalties
12 min
18
Shots
34

=== 5th place game ===
22 January 2017; 13:30	Israel	3–2 (2–0, 0–0, 1–2)	Bulgaria	Dunedin Ice Stadium; Attendance: 100

Game reference

Raz Werner
Goalies
Dimitar Dimitrov
Referee:
(New Zealand) Peter Haxell
Linesmen:
(United Kingdom) Danny Beresford
(United Kingdom) Oliver Finch

Kapulkin (Merkulov, Hoffman) – 03:02	1–0
Revniaga (Kapulkin, Kafri) (PP) – 12:10	2–0
Ignatovich – 54:38	3–0
	3–1	55:34 – Dikov (T. Georgiev)
	3–2	55:52 – Gatchev

10 min
Penalties
14 min
22
Shots
37

== Championship playoffs ==
=== Bracket ===
Semifinals
B1	Turkey	3
A2	Iceland	2
A1	China	11
B2	New Zealand	2

Final
B1	Turkey	2
A1	China	1
3rd place match
A2	Iceland	10
B2	New Zealand	0

=== Semifinals ===
21 January 2017; 17:00	Turkey	3–2 (0–1, 0–1, 3–0)	Iceland	Dunedin Ice Stadium; Attendance: 150

Game reference

Tolga Bozaci
Goalies
Maksymilian Mojzyszek
Referee:
Michael Weber (Switzerland)
Linesmen:
Frederic Peuriere (France)
Naoki Sawayama (Japan)

	0–1	11:42 – Johannsson (SH)
	0–2	39:25 – V. Arason (G. Arason, Oskarsson)
Bakal – 45:24	1–2
K. Salt (Savas, Y. Kars) (PP) – 54:55	2–2
Faner (K. Salt, Bakal) – 56:40	3–2

18 min
Penalties
18 min
28
Shots
28

21 January 2017; 20:30	China	11–2 (4–0, 1–2, 6–0)	New Zealand	Dunedin Ice Stadium; Attendance: 400

Game reference

Mingwei Ren
Goalies
Taylor Goodall
James Moore
Referee:
Peter Tarnaris (United States)
Linesmen:
Lauri Nikulainen (Finland)
Jae Hyung Park (South Korea)

Ying (Zuo) – 04:30	1–0
Huang (Zuo) – 04:55	2–0
Ying (Deng) – 06:06	3–0
Deng (Ying, Zhang) (PP) – 13:57	4–0
	4–1	34:16 – Leahy (Rooney)
Deng, (Wu) (PP) – 36:18	5–1
	5–2	39:02 – S. Brown
Li (Ying) – 40:20	6–2
Deng (Ying) – 42:50	7–2
Ma (Goa, Ying) – 49:38	8–2
Wu (Li) (PP2) – 53:21	9–2
Ying (Zhang) – 56:44	10–2
Ma (Si) – 58:26	11–2

8 min
Penalties
10 min
58
Shots
15

=== Third place game ===
22 January 2017; 17:00	Iceland	10–0 (0–0, 5–0, 5–0)	New Zealand	Dunedin Ice Stadium; Attendance: 275

Game reference

Arnar Hjaltested
Goalies
James Moore
Taylor Goodall
Referee:
(Japan) Shingo Ikegami
Linesmen:
(Japan) Jinya Chiba
(South Korea) Park Jae-hyung

Johannsson (H. Arnason) – 21:46	1–0
J. Arnason (Maack, Kristinsson) – 23:14	2–0
Sigrunarson (Olafsson, J. Arnason) – 32:13	3–0
Induss (J. Arnason) – 33:52	4–0
Olafsson (V. Arason, Sigrunarson) – 34:54	5–0
Kristinsson – 44:47	6–0
Thorsteinsson (Orongan) (PP) – 46:48	7–0
Kristveigarson (J. Arnason) – 49:47	8–0
Gunlaugsson (Orongan, Kristveigarson) – 51:00	9–0
Gunnlaugsson (Kristveigarson) – 59:57	10–0

6 min
Penalties
16 min
63
Shots
20

=== Final ===
22 January 2017; 20:30	Turkey	2–1 (1–0, 1–1, 0–0)	China	Dunedin Ice Stadium; Attendance: 350

Game reference

Tolga Bozaci
Goalies
Ren Mingwei
Referee:
(Russia) Sergey Morozov
Linesmen:
(Finland) Lauri Nikulainen
(Japan) Naoki Sawayama

H. Salt (E. Secer) – 18:22	1–0
Y. Kars (Savas) – 30:53	2–0
	2–1	35:00 – li (Deng, Ying)

4 min
Penalties
4 min
25
Shots
31

== Statistics ==
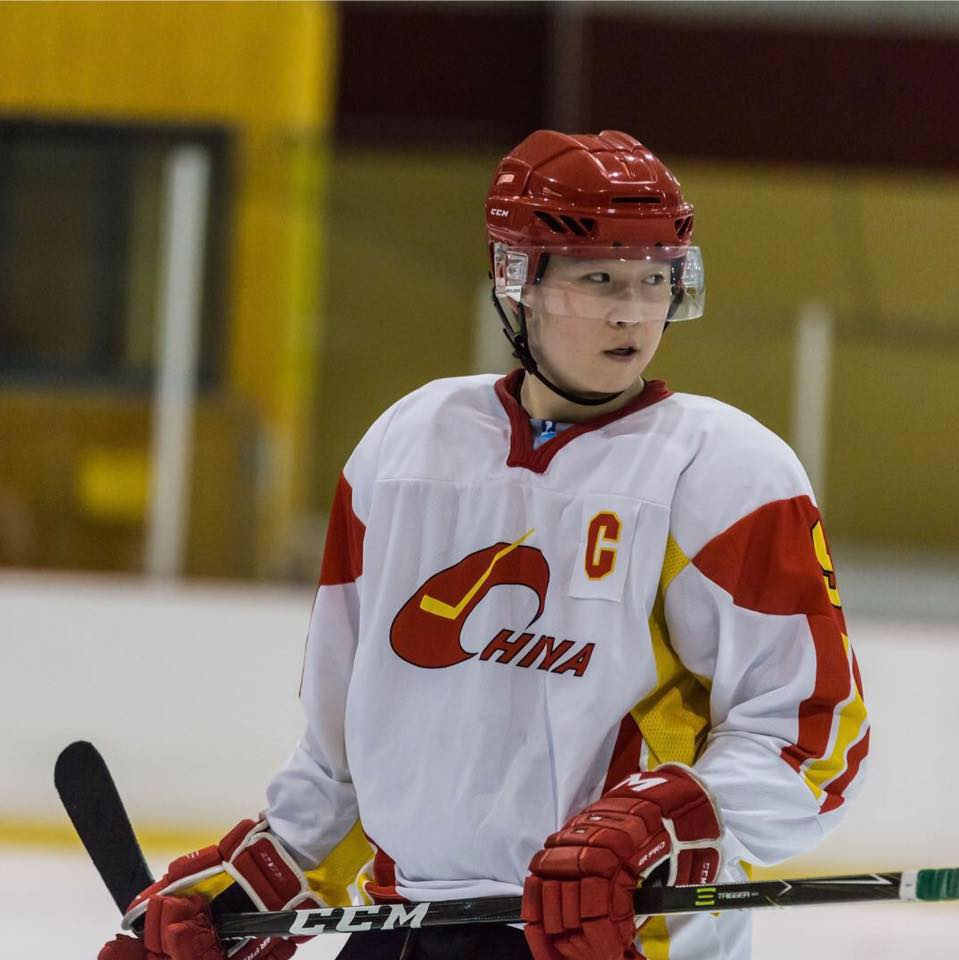
Rudi Ying of China led the tournament in scoring and was named the top forward

=== Top 10 scorers ===
Pos	Player	Country	GP	G	A	Pts	+/-	PIM
1	Rudi Ying	China	5	9	10	19	+14	0
2	Li Ou	China	5	6	4	10	+10	2
3	Hakan Salt	Turkey	5	7	2	9	+9	0
4	Deng Zemin	China	5	4	5	9	+12	4
4	Ariel Kapulkin	Israel	5	4	5	9	+8	4
6	Taylor Rooney	New Zealand	5	5	2	7	−1	2
7	Huang Qianyi	China	5	4	3	7	+2	8
7	Tom Ignatovich	Israel	5	4	3	7	+8	4
7	Miroslav Vasilev	Bulgaria	5	4	3	7	0	14
10	Hafthor Sigrunarson	Iceland	5	3	4	7	+6	20

=== Goaltending leaders ===
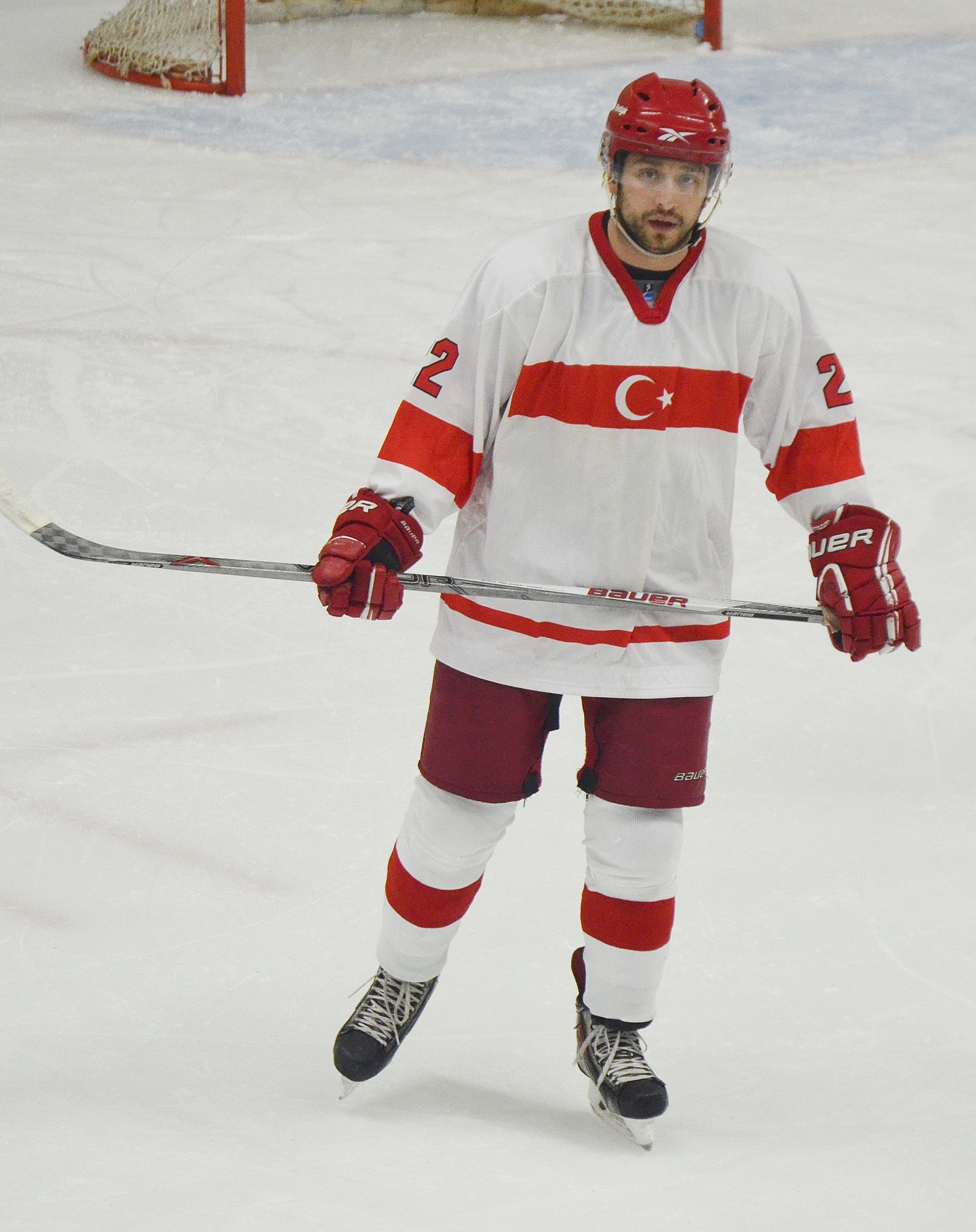
Yusuf Kars of Turkey was named the best defenceman

(minimum 40% team's total ice time)

Pos	Player	Country	MINS	GA	Sv%	GAA	SO
1	Arnar Hjaltested	Iceland	120:00	2	94.74	1.00	1
2	Raz Werner	Israel	279:51	11	92.76	2.36	1
3	Tolga Bozaci	Turkey	240:00	8	91.75	2.00	0
4	Maksymillian Mojzyszek	Iceland	179:00	7	91.25	2.35	1
5	Huang Sheng-chun	Chinese Taipei	206:14	13	90.08	3.78	0

== Awards ==
=== Best players selected by the directorate ===
- Goaltender: (Israel) Raz Werner
- Defenceman: (Turkey) Yusuf Kars
- Forward: (China) Rudi Ying

== Standings ==
Rank	Team	Result
1	Turkey	Promoted to the 2018 Division II B
2	China	
3	Iceland	
4	New Zealand	
5	Israel	
6	Bulgaria	
7	Chinese Taipei	Relegated to the 2018 Division III Qualification
8	South Africa	Relegated to the 2018 Division III Qualification
