= Ice Hockey Federation of Israel =

Israel governing body of amateur ice hockey

Israel
- Association name: Israel Ice Hockey Federation
- IIHF Code: ISR
- IIHF membership: 1 May 1991
- President: Mikhail Horowitz
- IIHF men's ranking: 33
- IIHF women's ranking: 44

The Israel Ice Hockey Federation (Hebrew: ההתאחדות הישראלית להוקי קרח, Arabic: الاتحاد الاسرائيلي لهوكي الجليد) is recognized as the governing body for amateur ice hockey in Israel and is a member of the International Ice Hockey Federation (IIHF). It is often called the Ice Hockey Federation of Israel in order to differentiate it from the IIHF.

== History ==
Ice hockey began in Israel when the first ice rink opened in Qiryat Motzkin in 1986. The Israel Ice Hockey and Figure Skating Association was formed in 1988 and was admitted to the International Ice Hockey Federation in 1991. Israel first competed in the IIHF Pool C world championships in South Africa in 1992, finishing 5th out of the six participating teams (South Africa, Spain, Greece, Luxembourg, Turkey and Israel).

The hockey and figure skating associations split when the sports became large enough to be independent, and the hockey association was renamed to the Ice Hockey Federation of Israel.

Ice hockey in Israel began to grow when several Russian Jewish émigrés, who had played professionally in the Soviet Union, began coaching in Metula, the site of Israel's first and currently only full-size rink. Most notable among these Russian coaches was Boris Mindel, a former defenseman on the Red Army Team, who established a junior program at the Canada Centre rink in Metula.

Ice hockey in Israel received an additional boost of momentum when Roger Neilson, coach of several National Hockey League (NHL) teams including the New York Rangers and the Toronto Maple Leafs, opened a branch of his summer ice hockey camp in Metula and attracted young North American players to train and compete with young Israelis interested in the sport. As of 2005, there are three ice skating rinks in Israel. An Olympic facility and smaller practice rink at the Canada Centre in Metula, and a small rink in the northern town of Ma'alot.

== International competition ==
In the summer of 1997, the Maccabiah Games included ice hockey for the first time and attracted Jewish teams from the United States, Canada, and Ukraine to compete along with the Israel National Team. The U.S. and Canadian team was composed of mostly NCAA players and several who had played in the NHL, including U.S. player coach Mike Hartman of the New York Rangers. At the same time, a team of Jewish teenagers from New York City traveled to Israel to face Boris Mindel's Metula team, and later invited the Israeli juniors to tour the Northeastern United States and Canada with them, giving the Israeli juniors their first exposure to North American competition. The New Yorkers, including many of the same players who had visited in 1997, visited again in 2004 to skate against the Israelis in a spirited series for the "Maccabi Cup".

In 2005, Israel, with the benefit of a number of players who were Israeli-Canadian dual citizens, won the gold medal at the IIHF Division II Group B World Championships and were promoted to Division I for the 2006 IIHF World Championships.

In 2006, after being outscored 47–3 in the IIHF World Championship Division I, Israel was relegated to the 2007 IIHF World Championship Division II.

In the summer of 2007, with outside temperatures reaching ninety degrees Fahrenheit, the first World Jewish Ice Hockey Tournament was held in Metula, with competing teams from Israel, Canada, France, and the winner, the United States.

== See also ==
- Ice hockey in Israel
- Israel men's national ice hockey team
- Israel men's national junior ice hockey team
- Israel men's national under-18 ice hockey team
- Israeli League (ice hockey)
