= 1999–2000 IIHF Continental Cup =

The Continental Cup 1999–2000 was the third edition of the IIHF Continental Cup. The season started on September 24, 1999, and finished on December 28, 1999.

The tournament was won by HC Ambrì-Piotta, who won the final group.

== Preliminary round ==
=== Group A ===
(Sofia, Bulgaria)

Team #1	Score	Team #2
SC Miercurea Ciuc (Romania)	15:3	(Turkey) İstanbul Paten SK
HC Levski Sofia (Bulgaria)	8:0	(Turkey) Gümüş Patenler
HC Levski Sofia (Bulgaria)	11:5	(Turkey) İstanbul Paten SK
SC Miercurea Ciuc (Romania)	22:1	(Turkey) Gümüş Patenler
İstanbul Paten SK (Turkey)	9:1	(Turkey) Gümüş Patenler
HC Levski Sofia (Bulgaria)	1:6	(Romania) SC Miercurea Ciuc

=== Group A standings ===
Rank	Team	Points
1	(Romania) SC Miercurea Ciuc	6
2	(Bulgaria) HC Levski Sofia	4
3	(Turkey) İstanbul Paten SK	2
4	(Turkey) Gümüş Patenler	0

=== Group B ===
(Nowy Targ, Poland)

Team #1	Score	Team #2
SC Energija (Lithuania)	7:4	(Croatia) KHL Medveščak
Podhale Nowy Targ (Poland)	12:0	(Bulgaria) HC Slavia Sofia
SC Energija (Lithuania)	19:0	(Bulgaria) HC Slavia Sofia
Podhale Nowy Targ (Poland)	7:1	(Croatia) KHL Medveščak
KHL Medveščak (Croatia)	7:0	(Bulgaria) HC Slavia Sofia
Podhale Nowy Targ (Poland)	7:1	(Lithuania) SC Energija

=== Group B standings ===
Rank	Team	Points
1	(Poland) Podhale Nowy Targ	6
2	(Lithuania) SC Energija	4
3	(Croatia) KHL Medveščak	2
4	(Bulgaria) HC Slavia Sofia	0

=== Group C ===
(Bucharest, Romania)

Team #1	Score	Team #2
HC Steaua București (Romania)	16:2	(Federal Republic of Yugoslavia) HK Spartak Subotica
HK Vojvodina (Federal Republic of Yugoslavia)	4:4	(Croatia) KHL Zagreb
HK Vojvodina (Federal Republic of Yugoslavia)	7:3	(Federal Republic of Yugoslavia) HK Spartak Subotica
HC Steaua București (Romania)	5:2	(Croatia) KHL Zagreb
HK Spartak Subotica (Federal Republic of Yugoslavia)	3:1	(Croatia) KHL Zagreb
HC Steaua București (Romania)	7:0	(Federal Republic of Yugoslavia) HK Vojvodina

=== Group C standings ===
Rank	Team	Points
1	(Romania) HC Steaua București	6
2	(Federal Republic of Yugoslavia) HK Vojvodina	3
3	(Federal Republic of Yugoslavia) HK Spartak Subotica	2
4	(Croatia) KHL Zagreb	1

=== Group D ===
(Dunaújváros, Hungary)

Team #1	Score	Team #2
HK Sportina Bled (Slovenia)	3:2	(Slovenia) HK Acroni Jesenice
Dunaferr SE (Hungary)	10:1	(Israel) HC Metulla
HK Acroni Jesenice (Slovenia)	16:1	(Israel) HC Metulla
Dunaferr SE (Hungary)	8:4	(Slovenia) HK Sportina Bled
HK Sportina Bled (Slovenia)	13:0	(Israel) HC Metulla
Dunaferr SE (Hungary)	6:3	(Slovenia) HK Acroni Jesenice

=== Group D standings ===
Rank	Team	Points
1	(Hungary) Dunaferr SE	6
2	(Slovenia) HK Sportina Bled	4
3	(Slovenia) HK Acroni Jesenice	2
4	(Israel) HC Metulla	0

=== Group E ===
(Lyon, France)

Team #1	Score	Team #2
CG Puigcerdà (Spain)	4:4	(Netherlands) Boretti Tigers Amsterdam
Lyon HC (France)	2:0	(Belarus) Keramin Minsk
Keramin Minsk (Belarus)	8:3	(Spain) CG Puigcerdà
Lyon HC (France)	11:1	(Netherlands) Boretti Tigers Amsterdam
Keramin Minsk (Belarus)	14:5	(Netherlands) Boretti Tigers Amsterdam
Lyon HC (France)	5:1	(Spain) CG Puigcerdà

=== Group E standings ===
Rank	Team	Points
1	(France) Lyon HC	6
2	(Belarus) Keramin Minsk	4
3	(Spain) CG Puigcerdà	1
4	(Netherlands) Boretti Tigers Amsterdam	1

=== Group F ===
(Angers, France)

Team #1	Score	Team #2
Irbiz Kyiv (Ukraine)	16:1	(Spain) CHH Txuri Urdin
ASG Angers (France)	26:0	(Belgium) Chiefs Leuven
Irbiz Kyiv (Ukraine)	19:0	(Belgium) Chiefs Leuven
ASG Angers (France)	12:1	(Spain) CHH Txuri Urdin
CHH Txuri Urdin (Spain)	4:3	(Belgium) Chiefs Leuven
ASG Angers (France)	7:3	(Ukraine) Irbiz Kyiv

=== Group F standings ===
Rank	Team	Points
1	(France) ASG Angers	6
2	(Ukraine) Irbiz Kyiv	4
3	(Spain) CHH Txuri Urdin	2
4	(Belgium) Chiefs Leuven	0

== First Group Stage ==
=== Group G ===
(Oświęcim, Poland)

Team #1	Score	Team #2
KTH Krynica (Poland)	1:1	(Latvia) HK Liepājas Metalurgs
Dwory Unia Oświęcim (Poland)	10:0	(Romania) SC Miercurea Ciuc
KTH Krynica (Poland)	11:1	(Romania) SC Miercurea Ciuc
Dwory Unia Oświęcim (Poland)	4:1	(Latvia) HK Liepājas Metalurgs
HK Liepājas Metalurgs (Latvia)	9:3	(Romania) SC Miercurea Ciuc
Dwory Unia Oświęcim (Poland)	3:1	(Poland) KTH Krynica

=== Group G standings ===
Rank	Team	Points
1	(Poland) Dwory Unia Oświęcim	6
2	(Poland) KTH Krynica	3
3	(Latvia) HK Liepājas Metalurgs	3
4	(Romania) SC Miercurea Ciuc	0

=== Group H ===
(Zvolen, Slovakia)

Team #1	Score	Team #2
Podhale Nowy Targ (Poland)	4:4	(Denmark) Rødovre Mighty Bulls
HKm Zvolen (Slovakia)	3:2	(Ukraine) Sokil Kiev
Sokil Kiev (Ukraine)	3:0	(Poland) Podhale Nowy Targ
HKm Zvolen (Slovakia)	5:2	(Denmark) Rødovre Mighty Bulls
Sokil Kiev (Ukraine)	6:2	(Denmark) Rødovre Mighty Bulls
HKm Zvolen (Slovakia)	2:4	(Poland) Podhale Nowy Targ

=== Group H standings ===
Rank	Team	Points	
1	(Slovakia) HKm Zvolen	4	(GF:3;GA:2)
2	(Ukraine) Sokil Kiev	4	(GF:2;GA:3)
3	(Poland) Podhale Nowy Targ	3	
4	(Denmark) Rødovre Mighty Bulls	1	

=== Group J ===
(Milan, Italy)

Team #1	Score	Team #2
Moskitos Essen (Germany)	10:6	(Romania) HC Steaua București
HC Milano Vipers (Italy)	0:3	(France) Reims HC
Reims HC (France)	5:1	(Germany) Moskitos Essen
HC Milano Vipers (Italy)	4:2	(Romania) HC Steaua București
HC Milano Vipers (Italy)	2:1	(Germany) Moskitos Essen
Reims HC (France)	5:2	(Romania) HC Steaua București

=== Group J standings ===
Rank	Team	Points
1	(France) Reims HC	6
2	(Italy) HC Milano Vipers	4
3	(Germany) Moskitos Essen	2
4	(Romania) HC Steaua București	0

=== Group K ===
(Székesfehérvár, Hungary)

Team #1	Score	Team #2
Dunaferr SE (Hungary)	1:1	(Slovenia) HDD Olimpija Ljubljana
Alba Volán Székesfehérvár (Hungary)	6:2	(Kazakhstan) Kazzinc-Torpedo
Dunaferr SE (Hungary)	8:5	(Kazakhstan) Kazzinc-Torpedo
Alba Volán Székesfehérvár (Hungary)	4:7	(Slovenia) HDD Olimpija Ljubljana
HDD Olimpija Ljubljana (Slovenia)	7:7	(Kazakhstan) Kazzinc-Torpedo
Alba Volán Székesfehérvár (Hungary)	6:4	(Hungary) Dunaferr SE

=== Group K standings ===
Rank	Team	Points	
1	(Slovenia) HDD Olimpija Ljubljana	4	(GF:7;GA:4)
2	(Hungary) Alba Volán Székesfehérvár	4	(GF:4;GA:7)
3	(Hungary) Dunaferr SE	3	
4	(Kazakhstan) Kazzinc-Torpedo	1	

=== Group L ===
(Cardiff, United Kingdom)

Team #1	Score	Team #2
Nottingham Panthers (United Kingdom)	8:6	(Russia) Lada Togliatti
Cardiff Devils (United Kingdom)	9:2	(France) Lyon HC
Lada Togliatti (Russia)	12:1	(France) Lyon HC
Cardiff Devils (United Kingdom)	5:3	(United Kingdom) Nottingham Panthers
Nottingham Panthers (United Kingdom)	5:3	(France) Lyon HC
Cardiff Devils (United Kingdom)	2:8	(Russia) Lada Togliatti

=== Group L standings ===
Rank	Team	Points	
1	(Russia) Lada Togliatti	4	(GF:14;GA:10)
2	(United Kingdom) Nottingham Panthers	4	(GF:11;GA:11)
3	(United Kingdom) Cardiff Devils	4	(GF:7;GA:11)
4	(France) Lyon HC	0	

=== Group M ===
(Sheffield, United Kingdom)

Team #1	Score	Team #2
Avangard Omsk (Russia)	2:2	(Norway) Storhamar Dragons
Sheffield Steelers (United Kingdom)	4:4	(France) ASG Angers
Avangard Omsk (Russia)	11:0	(France) ASG Angers
Sheffield Steelers (United Kingdom)	3:3	(Norway) Storhamar Dragons
Storhamar Dragons (Norway)	6:0	(France) ASG Angers
Sheffield Steelers (United Kingdom)	4:2	(Russia) Avangard Omsk

=== Group M standings ===
Rank	Team	Points	DIF
1	(Norway) Storhamar Dragons	4	+6
2	(United Kingdom) Sheffield Steelers	4	+2
3	(Russia) Avangard Omsk	3	
4	(France) ASG Angers	1	

(Slovakia) HC Košice, (Czech Republic) HC Keramika Plzeň, (Austria) VEU Feldkirch, (Switzerland) HC Ambrì-Piotta, (Russia) Ak Bars Kazan, (Belarus) HK Neman Grodno : bye

== Second Group Stage ==
=== Group N ===
(Plzeň, Czech Republic)

Team #1	Score	Team #2
HC Košice (Slovakia)	6:2	(Poland) Dwory Unia Oświęcim
HC Keramika Plzeň (Czech Republic)	3:2	(Slovakia) HKm Zvolen
HKm Zvolen (Slovakia)	6:2	(Slovakia) HC Košice
HC Keramika Plzeň (Czech Republic)	4:6	(Poland) Dwory Unia Oświęcim
HKm Zvolen (Slovakia)	4:1	(Poland) Dwory Unia Oświęcim
HC Keramika Plzeň (Czech Republic)	2:3	(Slovakia) HC Košice

=== Group N standings ===
Rank	Team	Points	
1	(Slovakia) HKm Zvolen	4	(GF:6;GA:2)
2	(Slovakia) HC Košice	4	(GF:2;GA:6)
3	(Poland) Dwory Unia Oświęcim	2	
4	(Czech Republic) HC Keramika Plzeň	2	

=== Group O ===
(Ambrì, Switzerland)

Team #1	Score	Team #2
HDD Olimpija Ljubljana (Slovenia)	5:2	(Austria) VEU Feldkirch
HC Ambrì-Piotta (Switzerland)	3:4	(France) Reims HC
VEU Feldkirch (Austria)	4:4	(France) Reims HC
HC Ambrì-Piotta (Switzerland)	5:3	(Slovenia) HDD Olimpija Ljubljana
HDD Olimpija Ljubljana (Slovenia)	4:3	(France) Reims HC
HC Ambrì-Piotta (Switzerland)	9:2	(Austria) VEU Feldkirch

=== Group O standings ===
Rank	Team	Points	
1	(Switzerland) HC Ambrì-Piotta	4	(GF:5;GA:3)
2	(Slovenia) HDD Olimpija Ljubljana	4	(GF:3;GA:5)
3	(France) Reims HC	3	
4	(Austria) VEU Feldkirch	1	

=== Group P ===
(Kazan, Russia)

Team #1	Score	Team #2
Lada Togliatti (Russia)	5:2	(Belarus) HK Neman Grodno
Ak Bars Kazan (Russia)	5:0	(Norway) Storhamar Dragons
Lada Togliatti (Russia)	5:3	(Norway) Storhamar Dragons
Ak Bars Kazan (Russia)	7:1	(Belarus) HK Neman Grodno
Storhamar Dragons (Norway)	2:2	(Belarus) HK Neman Grodno
Ak Bars Kazan (Russia)	4:0	(Russia) Lada Togliatti

=== Group P standings ===
Rank	Team	Points
1	(Russia) Ak Bars Kazan	6
2	(Russia) Lada Togliatti	4
3	(Norway) Storhamar Dragons	1
4	(Belarus) HK Neman Grodno	1

(Germany) Eisbären Berlin : bye

== Final Group Stage ==
(Berlin, Germany)

Team #1	Score	Team #2
Ak Bars Kazan (Russia)	7:0	(Slovakia) HKm Zvolen
Eisbären Berlin (Germany)	2:2	(Switzerland) HC Ambrì-Piotta
HC Ambrì-Piotta (Switzerland)	7:3	(Russia) Ak Bars Kazan
Eisbären Berlin (Germany)	2:2	(Slovakia) HKm Zvolen
HC Ambrì-Piotta (Switzerland)	7:3	(Slovakia) HKm Zvolen
Eisbären Berlin (Germany)	3:2	(Russia) Ak Bars Kazan

=== Final Group standings ===
Rank	Team	Points
1	(Switzerland) HC Ambrì-Piotta	5
2	(Germany) Eisbären Berlin	4
3	(Russia) Ak Bars Kazan	2
4	(Slovakia) HKm Zvolen	1
