= 2008–09 Israeli Hockey League season =

Season of the Israeli Hockey League

The 2008–09 Israeli Hockey League season was the 18th season of Israel's hockey league. HC Herzliya won its first Israeli championship.
