= 1996–97 Israeli Hockey League season =

Season of the Israeli Hockey League

The 1996–97 Israeli Hockey League season was the sixth season of Israel's hockey league. The Lions Jerusalem won the league title for the second straight year.
