= 2003–04 Israeli Hockey League season =

Season of the Israeli Hockey League

The 2003–04 Israeli Hockey League season was the 13th season of Israel's hockey league. HC Maccabi Amos Lod won their third league title.
