= 2024 World Junior Ice Hockey Championships – Division III =

International ice hockey tournament

2024 IIHF U20 World Championship Division III
Tournament details
- Host countries: Bulgaria; Bosnia and Herzegovina
- Venues: 2 (in 2 host cities)
- Dates: 22–28 January 2024; 25–30 January 2024
- Teams: 9

The 2024 World Junior Ice Hockey Championship Division III was a pair of international ice hockey tournaments organized by the International Ice Hockey Federation. It consisted of two tiered groups: the sixth-tier Division III A and the seventh-tier Division III B. For each tier's tournament, the team which places first will be promoted to the next higher division, while the team which places last in Group A will be relegated to Group B.

To be eligible as a junior player in these tournaments, a player can't be born earlier than 2004.

== Division III A ==
2024 IIHF U20 World Championship Division III A

Tournament details
- Host country: Bulgaria
- City: Sofia
- Venue: 1 (in 1 host city)
- Dates: 22–28 January 2024
- Teams: 6

Tournament statistics
- Games played: 15
- Goals scored: 135 (9 per game)
- Attendance: 1,775 (118 per game)
- Scoring leader: (Israel) Mike Levin (17 points)

Official website
- www.iihf.com

The Division III Group A tournament was played in Sofia, Bulgaria, from 22 to 28 January 2024.

=== Participants ===
Team	Qualification
Mexico	placed 6th in Division II B last year and were relegated
Israel	placed 2nd in Division III last year
Bulgaria	hosts; placed 3rd in Division III last year
Turkey	placed 4th in Division III last year
New Zealand	placed 5th in Division III last year
Kyrgyzstan	placed 6th in Division III last year

=== Standings ===
Pos	Team	Pld	W	OTW	OTL	L	GF	GA	GD	Pts	Promotion or relegation
1	Israel	5	5	0	0	0	41	14	+27	15	Promoted to the 2025 Division II B
2	New Zealand	5	3	1	0	1	31	17	+14	11	
3	Bulgaria (H)	5	3	0	1	1	22	19	+3	10	
4	Turkey	5	2	0	0	3	15	19	−4	6	
5	Mexico	5	1	0	0	4	17	20	−3	3	
6	Kyrgyzstan	5	0	0	0	5	9	46	−37	0	Relegated to the 2025 Division III B

Source: IIHF
Rules for classification: 1) points; 2) head-to-head points; 3) head-to-head goal difference; 4) head-to-head number of goals scored; 5) result against closest best-ranked team outside tied teams; 6) result against second-best-ranked team outside tied teams; 7) seeding before tournament.
(H) Host

=== Results ===
All times are local (Eastern European Time – UTC+2).

22 January 2024; 13:00	Kyrgyzstan	3–4 (0–1, 3–1, 0–2)	Turkey	Winter Sports Palace, Sofia

Game reference

22 January 2024; 16:30	Israel	8–6 (1–2, 5–1, 2–3)	New Zealand	Winter Sports Palace, Sofia

Game reference

22 January 2024; 20:00	Bulgaria	3–2 (0–1, 1–0, 2–1)	Mexico	Winter Sports Palace, Sofia

Game reference

23 January 2024; 13:00	New Zealand	12–1 (7–0, 2–0, 3–1)	Kyrgyzstan	Winter Sports Palace, Sofia

Game reference

23 January 2024; 16:30	Mexico	3–4 (1–2, 1–1, 1–1)	Turkey	Winter Sports Palace, Sofia

Game reference

23 January 2024; 20:00	Israel	7–3 (1–0, 3–3, 3–0)	Bulgaria	Winter Sports Palace, Sofia

Game reference

25 January 2024; 13:00	Mexico	3–5 (0–3, 1–2, 2–0)	New Zealand	Winter Sports Palace, Sofia

Game reference

25 January 2024; 16:30	Israel	16–1 (5–1, 8–0, 3–0)	Kyrgyzstan	Winter Sports Palace, Sofia

Game reference

25 January 2024; 20:00	Bulgaria	5–4 (2–0, 2–2, 1–2)	Turkey	Winter Sports Palace, Sofia

Game reference

27 January 2024; 13:00	Turkey	1–4 (1–2, 0–0, 0–2)	Israel	Winter Sports Palace, Sofia

Game reference

27 January 2024; 16:30	New Zealand	4–3 OT (2–0, 1–1, 0–2); OT: (1–0)	Bulgaria	Winter Sports Palace, Sofia

Game reference

27 January 2024; 20:00	Kyrgyzstan	2–6 (1–2, 0–2, 1–2)	Mexico	Winter Sports Palace, Sofia

Game reference

28 January 2024; 13:00	Turkey	2–4 (0–1, 1–0, 1–3)	New Zealand	Winter Sports Palace, Sofia

Game reference

28 January 2024; 16:30	Mexico	3–6 (0–2, 2–1, 1–3)	Israel	Winter Sports Palace, Sofia

Game reference

28 January 2024; 20:00	Bulgaria	8–2 (4–0, 0–2, 4–0)	Kyrgyzstan	Winter Sports Palace, Sofia

Game reference

=== Statistics ===
==== Top 10 scorers ====
Pos	Player	Country	GP	G	A	Pts	+/–	PIM
1	Mike Levin	Israel	4	9	8	17	+11	6
2	Ivan Dalmatau	New Zealand	5	7	6	13	+7	2
3	Yann Raskin	Israel	5	4	9	13	+10	4
4	Jackson Fontaine	New Zealand	5	8	4	12	+8	6
5	Nikita Zitserman	Israel	5	7	4	11	+13	0
6	Aleksandar Stanimirov	Bulgaria	5	4	6	10	+3	2
7	Caleb Chamberlin	New Zealand	5	2	8	10	+7	2
8	Jacob Carey	New Zealand	2	5	4	9	+6	0
9	Luc Taillon	New Zealand	5	5	3	8	+7	0
10	Youval Turner	Israel	5	1	7	8	+7	0

GP = Games played; G = Goals; A = Assists; Pts = Points; +/− = P Plus–minus; PIM = Penalties In Minutes
Source: IIHF

==== Goaltending leaders ====
(minimum 40% team's total ice time)

Pos	Player	Country	TOI	GA	Sv%	GAA	SO
1	Andrea Karabadjakov	Bulgaria	240:00	15	90.91	3.75	0
2	Santiago Cucuraqui	Mexico	292:59	19	89.44	3.89	0
3	Furkan Duran	Turkey	300:00	19	88.76	3.80	0
4	Alon Shipinel	Israel	180:00	8	87.88	2.67	0
5	David Verkhovski	Israel	120:00	6	85.71	3.00	0

TOI = Time on ice (minutes:seconds); GA = Goals against; GAA = Goals against average; Sv% = Save percentage; SO = Shutouts
Source: IIHF

==== Best Players Selected by the Directorate ====
- Goaltender: (Bulgaria) Andrea Karabadjakov
- Defenceman: (New Zealand) Luke Simon
- Forward: (Israel) Mike Levin

Source: IIHF

== Division III B ==
2024 IIHF U20 World Championship Division III B

Tournament details
- Host country: Bosnia and Herzegovina
- City: Sarajevo
- Venue: 1 (in 1 host city)
- Dates: 25–30 January 2024
- Teams: 3

Tournament statistics
- Games played: 6
- Goals scored: 73 (12.17 per game)
- Attendance: 1,950 (325 per game)
- Scoring leader: (Bosnia and Herzegovina) Belmin Sinanbegovic (12 points)

Official website
- www.iihf.com

The Division III Group B tournament was played in Sarajevo, Bosnia and Herzegovina, from 25 to 30 January 2024.

=== Participants ===
Team	Qualification
Bosnia and Herzegovina	hosts; placed 7th in Division III last year
South Africa	placed 8th in Division III last year
Luxembourg	first participation since 2003

=== Standings ===
Pos	Team	Pld	W	OTW	OTL	L	GF	GA	GD	Pts	Promotion
1	Bosnia and Herzegovina (H)	4	3	1	0	0	30	17	+13	11	Promoted to the 2025 Division III A
2	Luxembourg	4	2	0	1	1	33	13	+20	7	
3	South Africa	4	0	0	0	4	10	43	−33	0	

Source: IIHF
Rules for classification: 1) points; 2) head-to-head points; 3) head-to-head goal difference; 4) head-to-head number of goals scored; 5) result against closest best-ranked team outside tied teams; 6) result against second-best-ranked team outside tied teams; 7) seeding before tournament.
(H) Host

=== Results ===
All times are local (Central European Time – UTC+1).

25 January 2024; 18:00	Bosnia and Herzegovina	7–6 OT (1–3, 2–1, 3–2) (1–0)	Luxembourg	Skenderija, Sarajevo

Game reference

26 January 2024; 18:00	Bosnia and Herzegovina	9–2 (4–1, 3–0, 2–1)	South Africa	Skenderija, Sarajevo

Game reference

27 January 2024; 18:00	South Africa	0–12 (0–4, 0–3, 0–5)	Luxembourg	Skenderija, Sarajevo

Game reference

28 January 2024; 18:00	Luxembourg	2–5 (0–1, 1–2, 1–2)	Bosnia and Herzegovina	Skenderija, Sarajevo

Game reference

29 January 2024; 18:00	South Africa	7–9 (1–3, 3–3, 3–3)	Bosnia and Herzegovina	Skenderija, Sarajevo

Game reference

30 January 2024; 18:00	Luxembourg	13–1 (5–0, 3–0, 5–1)	South Africa	Skenderija, Sarajevo

Game reference
