= Bulgaria men's national junior ice hockey team =

Men's national junior ice hockey team representing Bulgaria

Bulgaria
- The coat of arms of Bulgaria is the badge used on the players jerseys.
- Association: Bulgarian Ice Hockey Federation
- Head coach: (Bulgaria) Martin Milanov
- Assistants: (Czech Republic) Bohumir Kinkor
- Captain: Martin Nikolov
- Most points: Vasko Polizoev (25)
- Team colors
- IIHF code: BUL

First international
- Hungary 3 – 1 Bulgaria (Bucharest, Romania; 3 March 1983)

Biggest win
- Bulgaria 22 – 1 Greece (Belgrade, Yugoslavia; 28 December 1990)

Biggest defeat
- Estonia 27 – 0 Bulgaria (Belgrade, Yugoslavia; 6 January 2002)

IIHF World Junior Championship
- Appearances: 29 (first in 1983)
- Best result: 16th (1983)

International record (W–L–T)
- 36–87–5

The Bulgarian men's national under-20 ice hockey team (Bulgarian: Национален отбор по хокей на лед на България до 20 години, Natsionalen otbor po khokeĭ na led na Bŭlgariya do 20 godini) is the national under-20 ice hockey team of Bulgaria. The team represents Bulgaria at the International Ice Hockey Federation's IIHF World Junior Championship Division III tournament.

== International competitions ==
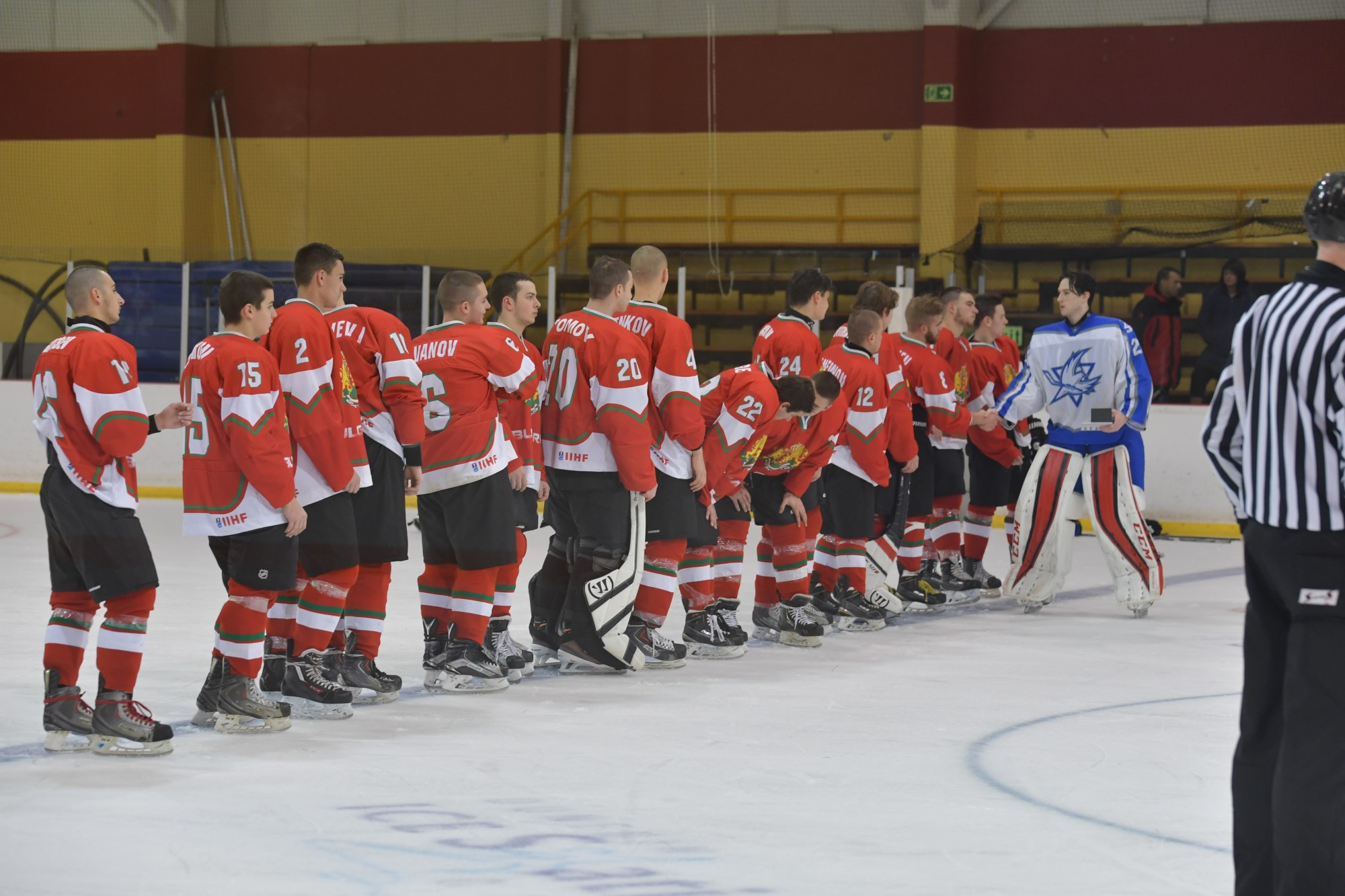
The Bulgarian national junior team at the 2017 World Junior Championship Division III.

- 1983 – 18th overall (2nd in Pool C)
- 1984 – 18th overall (2nd in Pool C)
- 1985 – 17th overall (1st in Pool C)
- 1986 – 16th overall (8th in Pool B)
- 1987 – 20th overall (4th in Pool C)
- 1988 – 19th overall (3rd in Pool C)
- 1989 – 21st overall (5th in Pool C)
- 1990 – 20th overall (4th in Pool C)
- 1991 – 22nd overall (6th in Pool C)
- 1992 – 24th overall (8th in Pool C)
- 1993 – 20th overall (4th in Pool C)
- 1994 – 24th overall (8th in Pool C)
- 1995 – Did not participate
- 1996 – 31st overall (5th in Pool D)
- 1997 – 32nd overall (6th in Pool D)
- 1998 – 32nd overall (6th in Pool D)
- 1999 – 33rd overall (7th in Pool D)
- 2000 – 34th overall (8th in Pool D)
- 2001 – 31st overall (5th in Division III)
- 2002 – 34th overall (8th in Division III)
- 2003 – 34th overall (6th in Division II Group A)
- 2004 – 39th overall (5th in Division III)
- 2005 – 40th overall (6th in Division III)
- 2006 – 38th overall (4th in Division III)
- 2007 – 40th overall (6th in Division III)
- 2008 – 41st overall (7th in Division III)
- 2009 – Division III tournament cancelled
- 2010 – 41st overall (7th in Division III)
- 2011 – 40th overall (6th in Division III)
- 2012 – 38th overall (4th in Division III)
- 2013 – 36th overall (2nd in Division III)
- 2014 – 40th overall (6th in Division III)
- 2015 – Did not participate
- 2016 – 36th overall (2nd in Division III)
- 2017 – 40th overall (6th in Division III)
- 2018 – 37th overall (3rd in Division III)
- 2019 – 38th overall (4th in Division III)
- 2020 – 39th overall (5th in Division III)
- 2021 – Cancelled due to COVID-19 pandemic
- 2022 – Did not participate
- 2023 – 37th overall (3rd in Division III)
- 2024 – 37th overall (3rd in Division IIIA)
- 2025 – 37th overall (3rd in Division IIIA)
- 2026 – 36th overall (2nd in Division IIIA)
