= Israeli League (ice hockey) =

Ice hockey league in Israel

- Current season, competition or edition: 2026–27 Israeli Hockey League season
- Sport: Ice hockey
- Founded: 1990
- First season: 1990–91
- No. of teams: 10- Top Division (Senior A); 8- National Division (Senior B); 11- Amateur Division (Senior C/Senior C North)
- Country: Israel
- Most recent champion: Kfar Saba Kings (1st title)
- Most titles: Haifa Hawks (6 titles)
- Website: israhockey.co.il

Israeli League is the top level ice hockey league of Israel.

== History ==
In 2017-2018, for the first time in the league's history, there were 3 senior divisions (A, B, C) with a total of 29 senior teams playing. The Haifa Hawks have won the most league titles, with six.

== Teams ==
=== Top division (Senior A) teams ===
Team	City	Arena	Capacity
Rishon Devils	Rishon LeZion	Ice Peaks	500
Rishon-2	Rishon LeZion	Ice Peaks	500
Maccabi Metulla Eggenbreggers	Metula	Canada Center	800
Haifa Hawks	Haifa	Canada Center	800
HC Bat Yam	Bat Yam	Ice Peaks	500
Dragons Nes Ziona	Ness Ziona	Ice Peaks	500
Hitmen Raanana	Ra'anana	Ice Peaks	500
Ninjas Holon	Holon	Ice Peaks	500

=== National division (Senior B) teams ===
Team	City	Arena	Capacity
Silver Fox-2	Yehud	Ice Peaks	500
Dragons-2	Ness Ziona	Ice Peaks	500
Dragons-3	Ness Ziona	Ice Peaks	500
Rishon Monsters	Rishon LeZion	Ice Peaks	500
White Bears	Tel Mond	Ice Peaks	500
HC Be'er Sheva	Beersheba	Ice Peaks	500

=== Amateur division (Senior C) teams ===
Team	City	Arena	Capacity
Petah Tikvah Wings	Petah Tikva	Ice Peaks	500
Bat Yam Turtles	Bat Yam	Ice Peaks	500
Rishon Legion	Rishon LeZion	Ice Peaks	500
Yehud Silver Fox	Yehud	Ice Peaks	500

=== Amateur division (Senior C North) teams ===
Team	City	Arena	Capacity
HC Metulla	Metula	Canada Center	800
CIHS Metula-2	Metula	Canada Center	800

== Champions ==
Season	Champion
1991	HC Haifa
1992	HC Haifa
1993	Not held
1994	HC Haifa
1995	HC Bat Yam
1996	Lions Jerusalem
1997	Lions Jerusalem
1998	HC Maccabi Amos Lod
1999	HC Metulla
2000	Monfort Ma'alot
2001	HC Maccabi Amos Lod
2002	Monfort Ma'alot
2003	Monfort Ma'alot
2004	HC Maccabi Amos Lod
2005	HC Maccabi Amos Lod
2006	Haifa Hawks
2007	Haifa Hawks
2008	Haifa Hawks
2009	Ice Time Herzliya
2010	Monfort Ma'alot
2011	HC Metulla
2012	Maccabi Metulla
2013	Rishon Devils
2014	Rishon Devils
2015	Rishon Devils
2016	HC Bat Yam
2017	Rishon Devils
2018	HC Bat Yam
2019	HC Bat Yam
2020	Stopped due the COVID-19 pandemic
2021	Rishon Devils
2022	Maccabi Metulla
2023	Kfar Saba Kings
2024	HC Chiefs Ashdod
2025	HC Chiefs Ashdod

== Titles by team ==
Titles	Team	Year
6	Haifa Hawks	1991, 1992, 1994, 2006, 2007, 2008
5	Rishon Devils	2013, 2014, 2015, 2017, 2021
4	HC Maccabi Amos Lod	1998, 2001, 2004, 2005
4	Monfort Ma'alot	2000, 2002, 2003, 2010
6	HC Bat Yam	1995, 2016, 2018, 2019, 2024, 2025
2	Maccabi Metulla	2012, 2022
2	HC Metulla	1999, 2011
2	Lions Jerusalem	1996, 1997
1	Kfar Saba Kings	2023
1	Ice Time Herzliya	2009

== See also ==
- Ice hockey in Israel
- Israel national ice hockey team
- Ice Hockey Federation of Israel
- Israel men's national junior ice hockey team
