= 2018 World Junior Ice Hockey Championships – Division III =

2018 IIHF U20 World Championship Division III

Tournament details
- Host countries: Bulgaria; South Africa
- Venue(s): 2 (in 2 host cities)
- Dates: 22–28 January 2018; 5–7 February 2018
- Teams: 8

The 2018 World Junior Ice Hockey Championship Division III was played with one group of six teams, as well as a two-team qualification tournament for the 2019 tournament. Israel won all their games and were promoted to Division II B. The team which placed first in the qualification tournament was expected to be promoted to Division III, swapping places with the sixth place team in Division III, but the 2019 organizers chose to make Division III a single tournament making these placings irrelevant.

The tournament was a round-robin tournament format, with two points allotted for a win, one additional point for a regulation win, and one point for an overtime or game winning shots loss.

To be eligible as a junior player in these tournaments, a player could not be born earlier than 1998.

The main tournament was held in Sofia, Bulgaria, while the qualification was played in Cape Town, South Africa. The qualification was supposed to have the debut of the Turkmenistan national junior team, though they dropped out prior to it starting.

== Division III main tournament ==
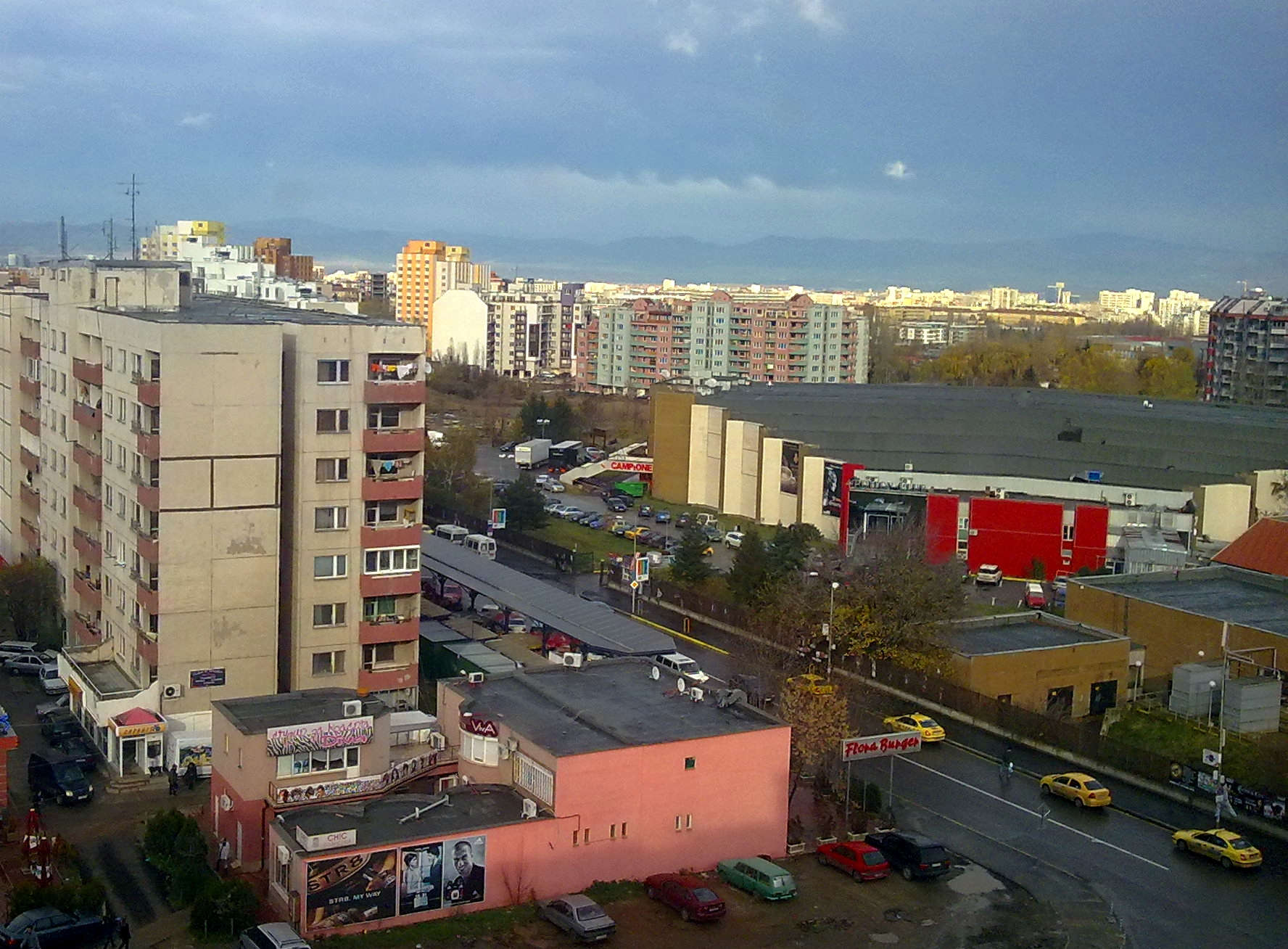
The Winter Sports Palace (on right), hosted the tournament.

The Division III main tournament was played in Sofia, Bulgaria, from 22 to 28 January 2018.

2018 IIHF U20 World Championship Division III
Tournament details
- Host country: Bulgaria
- Venue(s): 1 (in 1 host city)
- Dates: 22–28 January 2018
- Teams: 6

Tournament statistics
- Games played: 15
- Goals scored: 126 (8.4 per game)
- Attendance: 4,090 (273 per game)
- Scoring leader(s): (Israel) Mark Revniaga (15 points)

Official website
- www.iihf.com

=== Participating teams ===
Team	Qualification
Australia	placed 6th in Division II B last year and were relegated
China	placed 2nd in Division III last year
Iceland	placed 3rd in Division III last year
New Zealand	placed 4th in Division III last year
Israel	placed 5th in Division III last year
Bulgaria	hosts; placed 6th in Division III last year

=== Final standings ===
Pos	Team	Pld	W	OTW	OTL	L	GF	GA	GD	Pts	Promotion
1	Israel	5	5	0	0	0	25	11	+14	15	Promoted to the 2019 Division II B
2	China	5	3	0	0	2	30	12	+18	9	
3	Bulgaria (H)	5	3	0	0	2	22	24	−2	9	
4	Iceland	5	2	0	1	2	20	15	+5	7	
5	Australia	5	1	1	0	3	18	24	−6	5	
6	New Zealand	5	0	0	0	5	11	40	−29	0	

Source: IIHF.com
Rules for classification: 1) points; 2) head-to-head points; 3) head-to-head goal difference; 4) head-to-head number of goals scored; 5) result against closest best-ranked team outside tied teams; 6) result against second-best ranked team outside tied teams; 7) seeding before tournament.
(H) Host

=== Match results ===
All times are local (UTC+2).

22 January 2018; 13:00	Iceland	1–2 OT (0–0, 0–0, 1–1) (OT: 0–1)	Australia	Winter Sports Palace, Sofia; Attendance: 300

Game reference

Maksymillian Mojzyszek
Goalies
Alex Tetreault
Referee:
(Belarus) Petr Amosov
Linesmen:
(Bulgaria) Luchezar Stoyanov
(Estonia) Toivo Tilku

	0–1	55:17 – Kubara (Sillato) (PP2)
Orongan (PS) – 59:10	1–1
	1–2	60:37 – Sillato

28 min
Penalties
16 min
20
Shots
28

22 January 2018; 16:30	China	2–3 (1–1, 1–0, 0–2)	Israel	Winter Sports Palace, Sofia; Attendance: 280

Game reference

Ren Mingwei
Goalies
Raz Werner
Referee:
(Norway) Marcus Wannerstedt
Linesmen:
(Finland) Joona Elonen
(Lithuania) Deividas Kuneikis

	0–1	04:45 – Revniaga (PP)
Zhang P. (Ying) (PP) – 16:37	1–1
Ying (Guo) (PP) – 26:18	2–1
	2–2	45:45 – Revniaga (Avraham)
	2–3	52:07 – Aharonovich (Valeev, Revniaga) (PP)

8 min
Penalties
22 min
36
Shots
12

22 January 2018; 20:00	Bulgaria	5–3 (2–1, 1–1, 2–1)	New Zealand	Winter Sports Palace, Sofia; Attendance: 550

Game reference

Ivan Stoynov
Goalies
Tayor Goodall
Referee:
(Switzerland) Michael Tscherrig
Linesmen:
(China) Liu Tiange
(Germany) Tobias Schwenk

	0–1	13:44 – Aguirre-Landshoeft
V. Dikov (Vasilev) (PP) – 18:50	1–1
Gatsev (Abdi) – 19:05	2–1
Dilkov – 23:45	3–1
	3–2	28:48 – Hill (Taylor, Hopkins)
Vasilev (Gatsev) – 46:55	4–2
	4–3	53:34 – Hill (SH)
Vasilev (ENG) – 59:07	5–3

12 min
Penalties
14 min
29
Shots
20

23 January 2018; 13:00	China	1–2 (1–0, 0–1, 0–1)	Iceland	Winter Sports Palace, Sofia; Attendance: 83

Game reference

Ren Mingwei
Goalies
Maksymillian Mojzyszek
Referee:
(Norway) Marcus Wannerstedt
Linesmen:
(Lithuania) Deividas Kuneikis
(Poland) Rafal Noworyta

Zhu (Hou, Ying) – 09:18	1–0
	1–1	36:17 – Thorsteinsson (Induss) (PP)
	1–2	53:19 – Orongan (Atlason)

6 min
Penalties
10 min
30
Shots
25

23 January 2018; 16:30	Australia	6–3 (2–1, 1–1, 3–1)	New Zealand	Winter Sports Palace, Sofia; Attendance: 150

Game reference

Alex Tetreault
Goalies
Taylor Goodall
Referee:
(Kazakhstan) Konstantin Chubenko
Linesmen:
(Finland) Joona Elonen
(China) Liu Tiange

	0–1	07:04 – Brown (Aguirre-Landshoeft)
Rye (Sillato) – 13:09	1–1
Wood (Steven, Kubara) (PP) – 16:42	2–1
Ruck (Wood, Haley) – 34:37	3–1
	3–2	38:02 – Hill (Martinoli)
Sillato (Rye, Kubara) – 50:52	4–2
	4–3	51:59 – Martinoli
Flanagan (Steven, Sillato) – 52:14	5–3
Wood (Kubara, Tripp) – 57:57	6–3

14 min
Penalties
8 min
35
Shots
15

23 January 2018; 20:00	Israel	4–3 (1–1, 2–1, 1–1)	Bulgaria	Winter Sports Palace, Sofia; Attendance: 580

Game reference

Yehonatan Reisinger
Goalies
Ivan Stoynov
Referee:
(Belarus) Petr Amosov
Linesmen:
(Germany) Tobias Schwenk
(Estonia) Toivo Tilku

Kozev – 17:32	1–0
	1–1	18:09 – Abdi (Perchemliev)
	1–2	22:40 – Vasilev (Dilkov)
Mostovoy (Revniaga – 24:28	2–2
Ignatovich (Valeev, Mostovoy) (PP) – 26:49	3–2
	3–3	45:17 – Dilkov (Vasilev, V. Dikov) (PP)
Ignatovich – 52:46	4–3

38 min
Penalties
10 min
26
Shots
27

25 January 2018; 13:00	Australia	4–7 (1–1, 1–4, 2–2)	Israel	Winter Sports Palace, Sofia; Attendance: 80

Game reference

Alex Tetreault
Sebastian Woodlands
Goalies
Raz Werner
Referee:
(Switzerland) Michael Tscherrig
Linesmen:
(Lithuania) Deividas Kuneikis
(Poland) Rafal Noworyta

	0–1	08:07 – Revniaga (Avraham)
Steven (Sillato, Flanagan) (PP) – 18:37	1–1
Wood (Sillato, Steven) (PP) – 21:26	2–1
	2–2	23:02 – Revniaga (Avraham, Aharonovich) (PP)
	2–3	30:53 – Avraham (Revniaga, Aharonovich) (PP)
	2–4	32:51 – Valeev (Mostovoy, Lonkry)
	2–5	37:54 – Halpert (Hoffman) (PP)
	2–6	41:45 – Revniaga (Aharonovich, Mostovoy)
Ruck (Steven) – 49:40	3–6
	3–7	50:28 – Revniaga (Avraham, Mostovoy) (PP)
Wood (Ruck, Steven) – 51:02	4–7

18 min
Penalties
18 min
29
Shots
29

25 January 2018; 16:30	Iceland	13–3 (3–0, 6–2, 4–1)	New Zealand	Winter Sports Palace, Sofia; Attendance: 90

Game reference

Amar Hjaltested
Goalies
Taylor Goodall
Finley Forbes
Referee:
(Belarus) Petr Amosov
Linesmen:
(Germany) Tobias Schwenk
(Bulgaria) Luchezar Stoyanov

Atlason (G. Arason, Orongan) (PP) – 01:53	1–0
K. Arnason (Stefansson) (SH) – 04:40	2–0
J. Árnason (Induss, Kristveigarson) – 14:30	3–0
Kristinsson (Induss) – 24:27	4–0
Orongan – 25:01	5–0
Atlason (Orongan) – 28:12	6–0
	6–1	28:35 – Graham (Vince, Morley-Hall)
Induss (J. Árnason) – 29:33	7–1
	7–2	32:28 – Martinoli
Atlason (Orongan) – 32:53	8–2
Induss (V. Arason, Kristinsson) (PP) – 35:14	9–2
Induss (Orongan) (PP) – 47:56	10–2
	10–3	51:42 – Rawiri (Martinoli, Hill) (PP)
Kristveigarson (Grant) – 54:47	11–3
Atlason (Orongan) (PP) – 55:34	12–3
Maack (Kristinsson) – 56:45	13–3

32 min
Penalties
16 min
32
Shots
20

25 January 2018; 20:00	China	10–4 (3–1, 5–2, 2–1)	Bulgaria	Winter Sports Palace, Sofia; Attendance: 620

Game reference

Ren Mingwei
Zhang Yuhang
Goalies
Ivan Stoynov
Yavor Yordanov
Referee:
(Kazakhstan) Konstantin Chubenko
Linesmen:
(Finland) Joona Elonen
(Estonia) Toivo Tilku

	0–1	02:14 – Dilkov (Vasilev) (PP)
Wang J. (Guo, Huang) – 03:23	1–1
Xie (Zuo) – 11:48	2–1
Huang (Wang J., Zhang D.) (PP) – 19:45	3–1
	3–2	23:29 – Dilkov (PP)
Hou (Zhang P.) – 26:25	4–2
Hou (Zhang P., Ying) (PP) – 28:08	5–2
Ying – 29:50	6–2
	6–3	34:52 – Vasilev (Dilkov)
Guo (Ying, Wang J.) – 37:22	7–3
Wang J. (Huang) (SH) – 39:09	8–3
Ying – 51:49	9–3
Huang (Ying) – 54:20	10–3
	10–4	59:31 – V. Dikov (K. Dikov, Dilkov)

20 min
Penalties
24 min
39
Shots
14

26 January 2018; 13:00	Israel	6–2 (3–0, 0–0, 3–2)	Iceland	Winter Sports Palace, Sofia; Attendance: 71

Game reference

Yehonatan Reisinger
Goalies
Maksymillian Mojzyszek
Arnar Hjaltested
Referee:
(Kazakhstan) Konstantin Chubenko
Linesmen:
(China) Liu Tiange
(Germany) Tobias Schwenk

Revniaga (Aharonovich) – 08:07	1–0
Ignatovich – 11:03	2–0
Marziko (Shahar) – 19:26	3–0
	3–1	41:02 – Orongan (Kristveigarson, G. Arason)
Mostovoy (Aharonovich, Kapulkin) – 43:22	4–1
Revniaga (Aharonovich) (PP) – 48:44	5–1
	5–2	51:35 – Kristveigarson (Atlason, Orongan)
Revniaga (Aharonovich, Ignatovich) (PP) – 57:08	6–2

24 min
Penalties
14 min
26
Shots
25

26 January 2018; 16:30	New Zealand	2–11 (0–3, 0–6, 2–2)	China	Winter Sports Palace, Sofia; Attendance: 50

Game reference

Taylor Goodall
Finley Forbes
Goalies
Zhang Yuhang
Referee:
(Switzerland) Michael Tscherrig
Linesmen:
(Poland) Rafal Noworyta
(Bulgaria) Luchezar Stoyanov

	0–1	01:23 – Zhu (Yuyang)
	0–2	04:31 – Ying (Zhang D., Wang J.) (PP)
	0–3	11:33 – Feng
	0–4	20:46 – Guo (Yan, Huang)
	0–5	26:13 – Hou (Ying, Zhu)
	0–6	26:57 – Li (Xie)
	0–7	07:41 – Huang (Wang J.)
	0–8	30:04 – Huang (Wang J.)
	0–9	31:46 – Ying (Zhang P., Zhang D.) (PP)
	0–10	41:29 – Ying
Egan (Hill) (PP) – 51:17	1–10
Egan (Martinoli) (PP) – 56:40	2–10
	2–11	59:20 – Yu (Guo)

12 min
Penalties
26 min
9
Shots
44

26 January 2018; 20:00	Bulgaria	7–5 (1–0, 2–3, 4–2)	Australia	Winter Sports Palace, Sofia; Attendance: 410

Game reference

Ivan Stoynov
Goalies
Sebastian Woodlands
Referee:
(Norway) Marcus Wannerstedt
Linesmen:
(Finland) Joona Elonen
(Lithuania) Deividas Kuneikis

Dilkov (SH) – 06:53	1–0
	1–1	22:18 – Kubara (Brunt, Sillato) (PP)
	1–2	26:25 – Steven (Flanagan)
	1–3	29:27 – Kubara (Sillato)
Dilkov (Vasilev, V. Dikov) – 36:58	2–3
Petkov – 38:11	3–3
Ivanov (K. Dikov) – 45:30	4–3
	4–4	49:39 – Ruck
	4–5	50:47 – Steven (Wardlaw)
V. Dikov (Petkov, Georgiev) – 51:06	5–5
K. Dikov (Vasilev) (PP) – 55:58	6–5
Vasilev (Dilkov, V. Dikov) (ENG) – 59:47	7–5

10 min
Penalties
14 min
37
Shots
26

28 January 2018; 13:00	New Zealand	0–5 (0–1, 0–3, 0–1)	Israel	Winter Sports Palace, Sofia; Attendance: 51

Game reference

Taylor Goodall
Goalies
Raz Werner
Referee:
(Norway) Marcus Wannerstedt
Linesmen:
(Bulgaria) Luchezar Stoyanov
(Estonia) Toivo Tilku

0–1	19:28 – Avraham (Hoffman, Tamir) (PP)
0–2	29:51 – Aharonovich (Mostovoy, Revniaga) (PP)
0–3	31:04 – Revniaga (Lavon, Hoffman)
0–4	34:19 – Lavon (Hoffman) (PP)
0–5	52:36 – Revniaga (Kozev, Merkulov)

35 min
Penalties
10 min
26
Shots
35

28 January 2018; 16:30	Iceland	2–3 (1–0, 0–1, 1–2)	Bulgaria	Winter Sports Palace, Sofia; Attendance: 670

Game reference

Arnar Hjaltested
Goalies
Ivan Stoynov
Referee:
(Kazakhstan) Konstantin Chubenko
Linesmen:
(China) Liu Tiange
(Poland) Rafal Noworyta

Induss (Sverrisson, Kristinsson) – 02:52	1–0
	1–1	33:08 – Dilkov (Vasilev)
Orongan (PP) – 41:32	2–1
	2–2	48:04 – Dilkov (Vasilev, Mladenov)
	2–3	59:46 – V. Dikov (Dilkov, Mladenov)

8 min
Penalties
10 min
28
Shots
29

28 January 2018; 20:00	Australia	1–6 (0–2, 1–2, 0–2)	China	Winter Sports Palace, Sofia; Attendance: 105

Game reference

Alex Tetreault
Sebastian Woodlands
Goalies
Zhang Yuhang
Referee:
(Switzerland) Michael Tscherrig
Linesmen:
(Finland) Joona Elonen
(Germany) Tobias Schwenk

	0–1	00:16 – Guo (Huang, Wang J.)
	0–2	05:28 – Ying (Zhang D., Wang J.) (PP)
	0–3	25:26 – Ying
	0–4	29:09 – Zhu (Ying, Hou) (EA)
Wood (Sillato) – 38:28	1–4
	1–5	47:16 – Wang J. (Hou, Zhang D.) (PP2)
	1–6	53:42 – Huang (Wang J., Guo)

30 min
Penalties
18 min
21
Shots
41

=== Statistics ===
==== Top 10 scorers ====
Pos	Player	Country	GP	G	A	Pts	+/-	PIM
1	Mark Revniaga	Israel	5	11	4	15	+7	6
2	Rudi Ying	China	5	8	6	14	+10	4
3	Daniel Dilkov	Bulgaria	5	8	5	13	+4	6
4	Miroslav Vasilev	Bulgaria	5	5	7	12	+2	16
5	Huang Qianyi	China	5	5	6	11	+14	4
5	Axel Orongan	Iceland	5	5	6	11	−1	12
7	Wang Jing	China	5	3	8	11	+9	22
8	Tomer Aharonovich	Israel	5	3	7	10	+3	18
9	Aiden Sillato	Australia	5	2	8	10	+1	6
10	Thomas Steven	Australia	5	3	5	8	+1	2

GP = Games played; G = Goals; A = Assists; Pts = Points; +/− = Plus–minus; PIM = Penalties In Minutes
Source: IIHF

==== Goaltending leaders ====
(minimum 40% team's total ice time)

Pos	Player	Country	MINS	GA	Sv%	GAA	SO
1	Raz Werner	Israel	180:00	6	93.41	2.00	1
2	Maksymillian Mojzyszek	Iceland	165:51	7	91.14	2.53	0
3	Yehonatan Reisinger	Israel	120:00	5	90.38	2.50	0
4	Zhang Yuhang	China	153:57	5	87.80	1.95	0
5	Arnar Hjaltested	Iceland	134:32	8	85.19	3.57	0

TOI = Time on ice (minutes:seconds); GA = Goals against; GAA = Goals against average; Sv% = Save percentage; SO = Shutouts
Source: IIHF

=== Awards ===
Best Players Selected by the Directorate

- Goaltender: (Iceland) Maksymillian Mojzyszek
- Defenceman: (Bulgaria) Konstantin Dikov
- Forward: (Israel) Mark Revniaga

== Division III Qualification ==
The Division III Qualification tournament was played in Cape Town, South Africa, from 5 to 7 February 2018.

=== Participating teams ===
Team	Qualification
Chinese Taipei	placed 7th in Division III last year and were relegated
South Africa	hosts; placed 8th in Division III last year and were relegated

The tournament originally included Turkmenistan, but they withdrew before the event began.

=== Final standings ===
Pos	Team	Pld	W	OTW	OTL	L	GF	GA	GD	Pts	Promotion
1	South Africa (H)	2	2	0	0	0	6	4	+2	6	Promoted to the 2019 Division III
2	Chinese Taipei	2	0	0	0	2	4	6	−2	0	Promoted to the 2019 Division III

Source: IIHF
Rules for classification: 1) points; 2) head-to-head points; 3) head-to-head goal difference; 4) head-to-head number of goals scored; 5) seeding before tournament.
(H) Host

=== Match results ===
All times are local (UTC+2).

5 February 2018; 20:00	Chinese Taipei	0–1 (0–0, 0–1, 0–0)	South Africa	The Ice Station, Cape Town; Attendance: 150

Game reference
Huang Sheng-chun	Goalies	Ryan Boyd	Referees: (France) Pierre Dehaen (Slovakia) Vladimir Snášel; Linesmen: (Hungary) Botond Pálkövi (Israel) Gil Haim Tichon
0–1 / 28:47 – Johnson (R. Venter, Phakathi) (PP)			Referees: (France) Pierre Dehaen (Slovakia) Vladimir Snášel; Linesmen: (Hungary) Botond Pálkövi (Israel) Gil Haim Tichon
12 min	Penalties	29 min	Referees: (France) Pierre Dehaen (Slovakia) Vladimir Snášel; Linesmen: (Hungary) Botond Pálkövi (Israel) Gil Haim Tichon
22	Shots	29	Referees: (France) Pierre Dehaen (Slovakia) Vladimir Snášel; Linesmen: (Hungary) Botond Pálkövi (Israel) Gil Haim Tichon

6 February 2018; 20:00	South Africa	5–4 (2–3, 2–0, 1–1)	Chinese Taipei	The Ice Station, Cape Town; Attendance: 125

Game reference

Ryan Boyd
Goalies
Huang Sheng-chun
Referees:
(France) Pierre Dehaen
(Slovakia) Vladimir Snášel
Linesmen:
(Hungary) Botond Pálkövi
(Israel) Gil Haim Tichon

Taljaard (Kruger, Alford) – 01:50	1–0
	1–1	08:12 – Lin C. (Kuo, Chen K.) (PP)
R. Venter (Johnson, J. Venter) – 13:07	2–1
	2–2	14:19 – Lin K. (Chen K.) (PP)
	2–3	17:34 – Chiang (Lin C.) (PP)
Johnson (Cerff) (PP) – 23:31	3–3
Schuurman (Beukes) (PP) – 26:50	4–3
	4–4	40:53 – Chiang (Lee) (PP2)
Bremner (J. Venter, Schuurman) – 53:05	5–4

34 min
Penalties
32 min
37
Shots
33

7 February 2018; 20:00	Chinese Taipei	6–4 (exhibition only)	South Africa	The Ice Station, Cape Town

The third game was officially cancelled by the IIHF directorate, but an exhibition game was still played
