= HC Bat Yam =

Ashdod Chiefs
- City: Ashdod, Israel
- League: Israeli League
- Founded: 1992
- Operated: 1992–present
- Home arena: Blue Ice Arena
- Colours: Blue, white
- Captain: Joshua Greenberg

Championships
- Regular season titles: 1 (1994–95)
- Israeli League: 6 (1994–95, 2015–16, 2017-18, 2018-19, 2023-2024, 2024-2025)

HC Bat Yam is an Israeli ice hockey team based in Bat Yam that competes in the Israeli League. HC Bat Yam was founded in 1992 and won their first league title in 1995. In 2010, the club qualified for their first IIHF Continental Cup, however they were knocked out in the first round without winning a game. HC Bat Yam won their second title in 2016 and as a result qualified for the 2016–17 IIHF Continental Cup.

== History ==
HC Bat Yam was founded in 1992 in Bat Yam, Israel and joined the Israeli League. In the 1993–94 season, Bat Yam finished as runner-up to HC Haifa. Bat Yam improved in the 1994–95 season with the club finishing the regular season in first place after winning seven of their eight games to claim their first regular season title. In the playoffs Bat Yam was drawn against the fourth place HC Metulla for their semifinal. Bat Yam defeated Metulla 13–5 to advance to final against the Jerusalem Capitals who had defeated HC Haifa in the other semifinal. Bat Yam defeated the Jerusalem Capitals 11–3 to claim their first league title. The following season Bat Yam finished in second place behind the Lions Jerusalem. From the 1997–98 season to the 1999–2000 season, Bat Yam finished the regular season in fourth place and were eliminated from the playoffs in the semifinals. The following season, Bat Yam dropped out of playoff contention after finishing the regular season in fifth place. In the 2009–10 season, Bat Yam returned to the playoffs and qualified for the final against HC Ma'alot where they were defeated. The club however qualified for the 2010–11 IIHF Continental Cup where they entered in the first round. Bat Yam lost both of their games against CH Jaca and Ankara University SK and failed to qualify for the second round. The club again finished as runners-up in the 2011–12 season after being defeated by Maccabi Metulla. In 2012, the team's current arena, Ice Peaks Holon, was opened in the city of Holon. The following three seasons Bat Yam failed to qualify for the playoffs. In the 2015–16 season, Bat Yam finished the regular season in fourth placed and were drawn against the regular season winner, Horses Kfar Saba for the semifinal. Bat Yam defeated Horses Kfar Saba 7–2 and advanced to the final against Monfort Ma'alot who had defeated the Rishon Devils in the other semifinal. Bat Yam defeated Monfort Maalot 6–3 in the final to claim their second league title. As a result of winning the 2016 final Bat Yam also qualified for the 2016–17 IIHF Continental Cup where they entered in the first round. The club was placed in Group A alongside Irbis-Skate Sofia, Partizan Belgrade and Zeytinburnu Belediyespor.

== Season-by-season results ==
=== 2010-2015 ===
- The table shows the results of the regular season and the final stage.
- RS — The place occupied by the team is shown according to the results of the regular season.
- FS — The place occupied by the team is shown according to the results of the final stage.

Season	GP	W	SOW	SOL	L	GF	GA	GD	Pts	RS FS	Match for 3-th place		Final		Position	Name
Season	GP	W	SOW	SOL	L	GF	GA	GD	Pts	RS FS	Rival	Result	Rival	Result	Position	Name
2009–10	7; 3 10	5; 2 7	1; 0 1	0; 0 0	1; 1 2	43; 8 51	8; 6 14	+35 +2 +33	17; 6	2; 2			Monfort	0 : 2	Silver medal	Icebergs
2010–11	7; 3 10	4; 0 4	0; 0 0	0; 2 2	3; 1 4	34; 6 40	15; 13 28	+19 -7 +12	12; 2	4; 4	CIHS	2 : 6			4	
2011–12	9; 3 12	7; 1 8	1; 0 1	0; 0 0	1; 2 3	53; 5 58	16; 10 26	+37 -5 +32	23; 3	1; 2			CIHS	1 : 2	Silver medal	
2012–13	6	1	0	0	5	14	33	-19	3	6					6	HC Bat Yam
2013–14	6; 6 12	3; 4 7	0; 1 1	0; 1 1	3; 0 3	28; 34 62	32; 16 48	-4 +18 +14	9; 15	3; 5					5	
2014–15	8; 8 16	2; 3 5	0; 0 0	0; 0 0	6; 5 11	26; 21 47	41; 26 67	-15 -5 -20	6; 9	3; 8					8	

=== 2016 — 2018 ===
Season	GP	W	SOW	SOL	L	GF	GA	GD	Pts	RS	1/4 Finale		1/2 Finale		Match for 3-th place		Final		Position
Season	GP	W	SOW	SOL	L	GF	GA	GD	Pts	RS	Rival	Result	Rival	Result	Rival	Result	Rival	Result	Position
2015–16	9	6	0	0	3	79	27	+52	18	4	CIHS	1 : 0	Horses	7 : 2			Monfort	6 : 3	Gold medal
2016–17	9	4	1	0	4	62	26	+36	14	6	Horses	7 : 8							5 — 8
2017–18	9	8	0	0	1	74	28	+46	24	1	Hitmen	7 : 1	Horses	9 : 4			CIHS	5 : 2	Gold medal

=== 2019 ===
Regular season											Final round									
Season	GP	W	SOW	SOL	L	GF	GA	GD	Pts	RS	GP	W	SOW	SOL	L	GF	GA	GD	Pts	RS
2018-19	15	12	1	0	2	116	38	+78	38	2	3	3	0	0	0	19	4	+15	9	Gold medal

== Tournaments ==
- 2010–11 IIHF Continental Cup – 3rd in Group A of the first round. Failed to advance.
- 2016–17 IIHF Continental Cup – 4th in Group A of the first round. Failed to advance.

== Players and personnel ==
=== Current roster ===
- True on 15 September 2019

Goalies
Name	Birthday	Regular Season				Play-Off				TOTAL
Name	Birthday	Games GP	Goals G	Assistants A	Points P	Games GP	Goals G	Assistants A	Points P	Games GP	Goals G	Assistants A	Points P
Maxim Gokhberg	20 July 1996	13	-36	0	0	3	-4	0	0	16	-40	0	0
Artiom Loginov	18 April 2001	1	-2	0	0	0	0	0	0	1	-2	0	0
Защитники, Defenders
Имя	Дата рождения	Regular Season				Play-Off				TOTAL
Имя	Дата рождения	Games GP	Goals G	Assistants A	Points P	Games GP	Goals G	Assistants A	Points P	Games GP	Goals G	Assistants A	Points P
Nisim Botbol	13 May 1981	9	4	6	10	2	0	0	0	11	4	6	10
Ori Kafri	13 March 1997	12	10	19	29	3	1	1	2	15	11	20	31	from "Horses"
Danil Nykhaychuk	30 September 2000	13	4	3	7	3	0	3	3	16	4	6	10
Slobodov, Roi	17 July 2002	9	0	3	3	3	0	0	0	12	0	3	3	from "Turtles"
Sonin, Ilian	19 February 2003	13	0	0	0	3	0	0	0	16	0	0	0	from HK Bat Yam U20
Ларс Нойхаузен; Neuhausen, Lars	22 June 1993	9	3	2	5	3	1	0	1	12	4	2	6	from Duisburg Ducks
Anton Turchin	31 August 1973	10	0	2	2	3	0	0	0	13	0	2	2
Kozhevnikov, Ariel	20 April 2002	1	0	0	0	2	0	0	0	3	0	0	0	from "Turtles"
Нападающие, Forwards
Имя	Дата рождения	Regular Season				Play-Off				TOTAL
Имя	Дата рождения	Games GP	Goals G	Assistants A	Points P	Games GP	Goals G	Assistants A	Points P	Games GP	Goals G	Assistants A	Points P
Greenberg, Joshua Stanley	3 June 1988	14	25	21	46	3	7	3	10	17	32	24	56
Kostyukov, Konstantin		14	19	22	41	3	2	5	7	17	21	27	38
Artiom Verny	19 September 1998	9	17	12	29	3	4	3	7	12	21	15	36
Yan Youmashev	3 December 1991	12	10	8	18	3	1	0	1	13	10	9	19
Ostap Rodichev	21 August 1994	12	8	7	15	3	1	2	3	15	9	9	18
Or Rom	8 February 2000	10	8	5	13	1	0	0	0	11	8	5	13
Ezra Bernstein	23 April 1989	6	2	3	5	3	2	1	3	9	4	4	8
Goodman, Jacob Levey	6 October 2003	11	0	0	0	0	0	0	0	11	0	0	0	from HK Bat Yam U20

Team roster for the 2017–18 season

Nat	Name	Pos	S/G	Age	Acquired	Birthplace
(Israel)	Nisan Butbull	D	L	44	2007–08	
(Russia)	Evgeni Nabokov	G	L	50	2013–14	Ust-Kamenogorsk, Russia
(Israel)	Joshua Greenberg	F	L	37	2010–11	Los Angeles, California, United States
(Israel)	Alexander Korotkin	F	L	58	2013–14	
(Israel)	Denis Kozhevnikov	D	R	25	2014–15	
(Israel)	Al Beautikov	F		56	2014–15	Tel Aviv, Israel
(Russia)	Michail Kozhevnikov	D	L	44	2014–15	Leningrad, Soviet Union
(Israel)	Gil Kremer	D	R	32	2012–13	Ramat Gan, Israel
(Israel)	Stanislav Kvashnikov	G	L	27	2014–15	
(Israel)	Danil Nykhaychuk	D	L	25	2014–15	
(Israel)	Ostap Rodichev	F		28	2014–15	
(Israel)	Sergei Shifrin	F		43	2013–14	
(Russia)	Valeri Solomatov	D	L	33	2014–15	
(Israel)	Idan Treibochan	F	L	33	2009–10	Rishon LeZion, Israel
(Israel)	Anton Turchin	D	L	52	2013–14	
(Russia)	Yegor Valeyev	D	L	26	2014–15	Nizhnekamsk, Russia
(Russia)	Artyom Verny	F		32	2014–15	Moscow, Russia
(Israel)	Yan Youmashey	F	L	34	2010–11	Dushanbe, Tajikistan

=== Head coaches ===
- Yevgeni Gusin, 2006–2012
- Dmitri Gromkov, 2012–present

=== General managers ===
- Viktor Gokhberg, 2015–present

== Achievements ==
Israel

- Israeli League:
  - Winners (6) : 1994–95, 2015–16, 2017–18, 2018-19, 2023-2024, 2024-2025
