= Monfort Ma'alot =

- City: Ma'alot, Israel
- League: Israeli League
- Founded: 1999
- Home arena: Canada Centre
- Head coach: Eduard Revniaga

Franchise history
- 1999-present: Monfort

Monfort Ma'alot is an Israeli ice hockey team in the city of Ma'alot. The team plays in the Israeli League, the top level of ice hockey in the country.

== History ==
The club was founded in 1999, and won the Israeli League for the first time a year later. The club won back-to-back titles in 2002 and 2003, and won their fourth Israeli Championship in 2010.

Ma'alot took part in the IIHF Continental Cup in the 2001, 2003, and 2004 seasons. In 2001, they were paired with KHK Crvena Zvezda, HC Levski Sofia, and Istanbul Paten Kulübü, and finished with one win and two losses. In the 2003 season, they lost all three games. In 2004, they lost all three games to KHL Medveščak, DAB-Docler, and HC Levski Sofia.

== Achievements ==
- Israeli champion (4): 2000, 2002, 2003, 2010
