= Haifa Hawks =

- City: Haifa, Israel
- League: Israeli League
- Founded: 1990
- Home arena: Canada Centre
- Website: hawkshaifa.com

The Haifa Hawks are an Israeli ice hockey team based in the city of Haifa. They participate in the Israeli League, the top level of Israeli ice hockey.

== History ==
The history of the club is the history of Israeli hockey. In 1990, an indoor skating rink opened in Haifa, which gave impetus to the creation of the Haifa Hockey Club that same year.[1] The Haifa Hockey Club (later the Haifa Hawks) won the first three Israeli championships – in 1990, 1991 and 1994. Key roles in the team’s success were played by Mike Rubin and Mark Telesnik, who came from Canada, as well as young repatriates from the CIS countries – Kyiv Sokol alumni Alexander Stolyar and Sergey Gudzik, Krasnoyarsk native Evgeny Feldman and goalkeeper Boris Amromin, who went through the Dynamo Kharkov academy.[1] The team took third place several times, and in 2005 won silver medals, losing to the strong Maccabi Amos Lod. Over the next three seasons, the Haifa team won three more national titles, becoming the Israeli champion six times. In 2018, the Haifa club was unable to stay in the top division of Israeli hockey, and the following season the team played in the second division. Before the 2019/2020 season, a split occurred in Israeli hockey. Several teams, as well as the second and third divisions, were disbanded, and only the first division remained, in which the team played. The tournament was not completed due to the COVID-19 pandemic. In 2022, the team played in the second division again.[2]

== Achievements ==
- Israeli champion (6): 1990, 1991, 1994, 2006, 2007, 2008

== Notable players ==
- Alon Eizenman
- Oren Eizenman
- Daniel Spivak
