= HC Metulla =

- City: Metulla, Israel
- League: Israeli League
- Founded: 1996
- Home arena: Canada Centre

HC Metulla is an ice hockey team in Metulla, Israel. They play in the Israeli League, the top level of ice hockey in Israel.

== History ==
The club was founded in 1996, and won the Israeli League in 1999 and 2011.

Also in 1999, Metulla participated in Group D of the 1999–2000 IIHF Continental Cup. They finished in 4th place with a 1 : 10 loss to Dunaferr SE, 1 : 16 loss to HK Acroni Jesenice, and a 0 : 13 loss to HK Sportina Bled.

== Achievements ==
- Israeli champion (1): 1999, 2011

== Notable players ==
- Eliezer Sherbatov (born 1991), Canadian-Israeli
- Daniel Spivak
