= IIHF World U20 Championship Division III =

Men's ice hockey tournament

- Upcoming season or competition: 2027 IIHF U20 World Championship Division III
- Formerly: D-series (1996–2000)
- Sport: Ice hockey
- Founded: 1996 (D-series); 2001 (Division III)
- No. of teams: 12
- Promotion to: Division II
- Website: IIHF.com

The IIHF World U20 Championship Division III is played every year among the ice hockey teams under the age of 20 who were placed in Division III in the previous year.

Until 2001 the tournament was known as the D-series.

== Results ==
Year	Promoted		Relegated
Year	To IIHF U20 Division II	To Division III A	To Division III B
2001	Netherlands	Iceland (promoted to Division III)	–
2002	All teams get promoted	–	–
2003	South Korea, Belgium	–	–
2004	Australia, China	–	–
2005	Mexico, New Zealand	–	–
2006	Lithuania, Iceland	–	–
2007	China, Belgium	–	–
2008	New Zealand, Serbia	–	–
2009	Cancelled		
2010	Australia, Iceland	–	–
2011	Mexico, Serbia	–	–
2012	Iceland	–	–
2013	China	–	–
2014	Belgium	–	–
2015	China	–	–
2016	Mexico	–	–
2017	Turkey	–	Chinese Taipei, South Africa (Relegated to Division III Qualification)
2018	Israel	South Africa, Chinese Taipei (Promoted to Division III)	–
2019	China	–	–
2020	Iceland	–	–
2021	Cancelled due to the COVID-19 pandemic		
2022	Chinese Taipei, Mexico	–	–
2023	Australia	–	–
2024	Israel	Bosnia and Herzegovina	Kyrgyzstan
2025	New Zealand	Thailand	Mexico
2026	Chinese Taipei	Kyrgyzstan	Bosnia and Herzegovina
