= Luxembourg men's national junior ice hockey team =

Luxembourg
- Association: Luxembourg Ice Hockey Federation
- General manager: Monique Scheier
- Head coach: Christer Eriksson
- Assistants: Fredrik Dufåker
- Most points: Charlie Springer (10)
- Team colors
- IIHF code: LUX

First international
- Iceland 6 – 2 Luxembourg (Luxembourg City, Luxembourg; 26 April 2001)

Biggest win
- Luxembourg 12 – 0 South Africa (Sarajevo, Bosnia and Herzegovina; 27 January 2024); Luxembourg 13 – 1 South Africa (Sarajevo, Bosnia and Herzegovina; 30 January 2024)

Biggest defeat
- South Korea 17 – 0 Luxembourg (İzmit, Turkey; 21 January 2003)

IIHF World U20 Championship
- Appearances: 5 (first in 2003)
- Best result: 39th (2003)

International record (W–L–T)
- 5–13–0

The Luxembourg men's national under-20 ice hockey team is the national under-20 ice hockey team of Luxembourg. The team is controlled by the Luxembourg Ice Hockey Federation, a member of the International Ice Hockey Federation.

== History ==
Luxembourg played its first game in 2001 during a qualification game against Iceland for participation in Division III of the 2002 World Junior Ice Hockey Championships. The game was held in Luxembourg City, Luxembourg, with Luxembourg losing 6–2. The game was part of a three team qualification tournament which included Iceland, Ireland and Luxembourg. The tournament was won by Iceland who won both of their games and gained promotion to the 2002 World Junior Ice Hockey Championships, resulting in Luxembourg failing to qualify. During the tournament Luxembourg won their first ever international game 10–0 against Ireland.

In 2003, Luxembourg competed in Division III of the 2003 World Junior Ice Hockey Championships, held in İzmit, Turkey. The tournament included teams from Australia, Belgium, South Korea, and Turkey. Luxembourg finished last in the tournament after losing all four of their games, including a 17–0 loss to South Korea, the worst defeat in team history.

== International competitions ==
- 2001 World Junior Championships – 2nd in Division III Qualification (44th overall)
- 2002 – Did not participate
- 2003 World Junior Championships – 5th in Division III (39th overall)
- 2004–2023 – Did not participate
- 2024 World Junior Championships – 2nd in Division IIIB (42nd overall)
- 2025 World Junior Championships – 4th in Division IIIB (44th overall)
- 2026 World Junior Championships – 4th in Division IIIB (44th overall)

== See also ==
- Luxembourg men's national ice hockey team
