= Chinese Taipei national ice hockey team =

Chinese Taipei national ice hockey team may refer to:

- Chinese Taipei men's national ice hockey team
- Chinese Taipei men's national junior ice hockey team
- Chinese Taipei men's national under-18 ice hockey team
- Chinese Taipei women's national ice hockey team
