= 2022–23 IIHF Continental Cup =

2022–2023 IIHF Continental Cup

Tournament details
- Dates: 23 September 2022 – 15 January 2023
- Teams: 19

Final positions
- Champions: (Slovakia) HK Nitra (1st title)
- Runners-up: (France) Ducs d'Angers
- Third place: (United Kingdom) Cardiff Devils
- Fourth place: (Italy) Asiago Hockey

Tournament statistics
- Games played: 42

The 2022–23 Continental Cup was the 25th edition of the IIHF Continental Cup, Europe's second-tier ice hockey club competition organised by International Ice Hockey Federation. The season began on 23 September 2022 and the final tournament was played from 13 to 15 January 2023.

HK Nitra won the tournament for the first time thus becoming the fifth Slovak team in history to win the trophy.

For the first time since the 2014–15 season, the IIHF Continental Cup winners did not get a wild card spot for the next season of the Champions Hockey League due to the reduction in the number of teams participating in the latter beginning from the 2023–24 season.

== Qualified teams ==
Team	Qualification
Enter in the third round
(Ukraine) HC Kremenchuk	2021–22 Ukrainian Hockey League runners-up
(Latvia) HK Zemgale/LLU	2021–22 Latvian Hockey League champions
(Slovakia) HK Nitra	2021–22 Slovak Extraliga runners-up
(United Kingdom) Cardiff Devils	2021–22 EIHL playoff champions
(Kazakhstan) ~~Saryarka Karagandy~~	2021–22 Kazakhstan Hockey Championship champions
(Poland) Unia Oświęcim	2021–22 Polska Hokej Liga runners-up
Enter in the second round
(Hungary) Ferencvárosi TC	2021–22 OB I bajnokság champions
(Italy) Asiago Hockey	2021–22 IHL - Elite champions
(Romania) HSC Csíkszereda	2021–22 Romanian Hockey League champions
(France) Ducs d'Angers	2021–22 Coupe de France winners
(Slovenia) HDD Jesenice	2021–22 Slovenian Ice Hockey League champions
(Serbia) HK Vojvodina	2021–22 Serbian Hockey League champions
Enter in the first round
(Belgium) Bulldogs Liège	2021–22 BeNe League champions
(Lithuania) Hockey Punks Vilnius	2021–22 Lithuania Hockey League champions
(Croatia) KHL Sisak	2021–22 Croatian Ice Hockey League champions
(Iceland) Skautafélag Akureyrar	2021–22 Icelandic Hockey League champions
(Estonia) Tartu Välk 494	2021–22 Meistriliiga champions
(Bulgaria) NSA Sofia	2021–22 Bulgarian Hockey League champions
(Spain) FC Barcelona	2021–22 Liga Nacional de Hockey Hielo champions
(Turkey) Buzadam Istanbul	2021–22 Turkish Ice Hockey Super League champions

Notes

Ukraine (UKR): The league winners Sokil Kyiv are unable to participate due to financial issue. The league's runners up HK Kremenchuk were named as their replacement.

== First round ==
=== Group A ===
The Group A tournament was played in Sofia, Bulgaria, from 23 to 25 September 2022.

Pos	Team	Pld	W	OTW	OTL	L	GF	GA	GD	Pts	Qualification
1	(Croatia) KHL Sisak	3	3	0	0	0	22	10	+12	9	Second round
2	(Estonia) Tartu Välk 494	3	2	0	0	1	22	10	+12	6	
3	(Iceland) Skautafélag Akureyrar	3	0	1	0	2	8	19	−11	2	
4	(Bulgaria) NSA Sofia (H)	3	0	0	1	2	14	27	−13	1	

Source: IIHF
(H) Host

All times are local (UTC+3).

23 September 2022; 16:00	Tartu Välk 494 (Estonia)	2–7 (0–2, 0–2, 2–3)	(Croatia) KHL Sisak	Winter Sports Palace, Sofia; Attendance: 180

Game reference
83 min	Penalties	41 min
39	Shots	31

23 September 2022; 19:30	Skautafélag Akureyrar (Iceland)	6–5 GWS (1–1, 2–2, 2–2) (OT: 0–0) (SO: 1–0)	(Bulgaria) NSA Sofia	Winter Sports Palace, Sofia; Attendance: 250

Game reference
6 min	Penalties	7 min
38	Shots	23

24 September 2022; 16:00	Skautafélag Akureyrar (Iceland)	2–6 (0–2, 1–2, 1–2)	(Croatia) KHL Sisak	Winter Sports Palace, Sofia; Attendance: 65

Game reference
41 min	Penalties	43 min
28	Shots	41

24 September 2022; 19:30	NSA Sofia (Bulgaria)	3–12 (1–2, 1–5, 1–5)	(Estonia) Tartu Välk 494	Winter Sports Palace, Sofia; Attendance: 260

Game reference
20 min	Penalties	14 min
19	Shots	41

25 September 2022; 16:00	KHL Sisak (Croatia)	9–6 (4–1, 3–2, 2–3)	(Bulgaria) NSA Sofia	Winter Sports Palace, Sofia; Attendance: 150

Game reference
14 min	Penalties	14 min
49	Shots	30

25 September 2022; 19:30	Tartu Välk 494 (Estonia)	8–0 (1–0, 2–0, 5–0)	(Iceland) Skautafélag Akureyrar	Winter Sports Palace, Sofia; Attendance: 60

Game reference
14 min	Penalties	16 min
30	Shots	25

=== Group B ===
The Group B tournament was played in Istanbul, Turkey, from 23 to 25 September 2022.

Pos	Team	Pld	W	OTW	OTL	L	GF	GA	GD	Pts	Qualification
1	(Turkey) Buzadam İstanbul (H)	3	3	0	0	0	19	5	+14	9	Second round
2	(Belgium) Bulldogs Liège	3	2	0	0	1	13	4	+9	6	
3	(Lithuania) Hockey Punks Vilnius	3	1	0	0	2	6	14	−8	3	
4	(Spain) FC Barcelona	3	0	0	0	3	7	22	−15	0	

Source: IIHF
(H) Host

All times are local (UTC+3).

23 September 2022; 17:00	FC Barcelona (Spain)	0–7 (0–3, 0–1, 0–3)	(Belgium) Bulldogs Liège	Zeytinburnu Ice Rink, Istanbul; Attendance: 50

Game reference
28 min	Penalties	39 min
42	Shots	24

23 September 2022; 20:30	Buzadam İstanbul (Turkey)	6–0 (2–0, 3–0, 1–0)	(Lithuania) Hockey Punks Vilnius	Zeytinburnu Ice Rink, Istanbul; Attendance: 154

Game reference
10 min	Penalties	19 min
42	Shots	19

24 September 2022; 17:00	FC Barcelona (Spain)	3–6 (1–2, 0–2, 2–2)	(Lithuania) Hockey Punks Vilnius	Zeytinburnu Ice Rink, Istanbul; Attendance: 52

Game reference
12 min	Penalties	14 min
53	Shots	21

24 September 2022; 20:30	Bulldogs Liège (Belgium)	1–4 (0–1, 0–1, 1–2)	(Turkey) Buzadam İstanbul	Zeytinburnu Ice Rink, Istanbul; Attendance: 321

Game reference
26 min	Penalties	20 min
28	Shots	47

25 September 2022; 17:00	Buzadam İstanbul (Turkey)	9–4 (2–2, 3–0, 4–2)	(Spain) FC Barcelona	Zeytinburnu Ice Rink, Istanbul; Attendance: 308

Game reference
91 min	Penalties	33 min
31	Shots	38

25 September 2022; 20:30	Hockey Punks Vilnius (Lithuania)	0–5 (0–1, 0–2, 0–2)	(Belgium) Bulldogs Liège	Zeytinburnu Ice Rink, Istanbul; Attendance: 53

Game reference
8 min	Penalties	16 min
31	Shots	28

== Second round ==
=== Group C ===
The Group C tournament was played in Angers, France, from 14 to 16 October 2022.

Pos	Team	Pld	W	OTW	OTL	L	GF	GA	GD	Pts	Qualification
1	(France) Ducs d'Angers (H)	3	3	0	0	0	24	6	+18	9	Third round
2	(Romania) SC Miercurea Ciuc	3	2	0	0	1	11	6	+5	6	
3	(Hungary) Ferencvárosi TC	3	1	0	0	2	17	15	+2	3	
4	(Croatia) KHL Sisak	3	0	0	0	3	2	27	−25	0	

Source: IIHF
(H) Host

All times are local (UTC+2).

14 October 2022; 16:30	SC Miercurea Ciuc (Romania)	5–0 (2–0, 0–0, 3–0)	(Croatia) KHL Sisak	Angers IceParc, Angers; Attendance: 231

Game reference
6 min	Penalties	12 min
38	Shots	20

14 October 2022; 20:00	Ducs d'Angers (France)	8–5 (2–0, 4–2, 2–3)	(Hungary) Ferencvárosi TC	Angers IceParc, Angers; Attendance: 2,771

Game reference
6 min	Penalties	6 min
29	Shots	43

15 October 2022; 16:30	SC Miercurea Ciuc (Romania)	5–2 (1–1, 1–0, 3–1)	(Hungary) Ferencvárosi TC	Angers IceParc, Angers; Attendance: 310

Game reference
8 min	Penalties	22 min
38	Shots	32

15 October 2022; 20:00	KHL Sisak (Croatia)	0–12 (0–0, 0–5, 0–7)	(France) Ducs d'Angers	Angers IceParc, Angers; Attendance: 3,237

Game reference
4 min	Penalties	0 min
15	Shots	67

16 October 2022; 14:00	Ferencvárosi TC (Hungary)	10–2 (2–2, 5–0, 3–0)	(Croatia) KHL Sisak	Angers IceParc, Angers; Attendance: 267

Game reference
15 min	Penalties	6 min
72	Shots	19

16 October 2022; 17:30	Ducs d'Angers (France)	4–1 (1–0, 2–1, 1–0)	(Romania) SC Miercurea Ciuc	Angers IceParc, Angers; Attendance: 3,250

Game reference
8 min	Penalties	16 min
43	Shots	31

=== Group D ===
The Group D tournament was played in Asiago, Italy, from 14 to 16 October 2022.

Pos	Team	Pld	W	OTW	OTL	L	GF	GA	GD	Pts	Qualification
1	(Italy) Asiago Hockey (H)	3	3	0	0	0	28	5	+23	9	Third round
2	(Slovenia) Acroni Jesenice	3	2	0	0	1	14	7	+7	6	Third round
3	(Turkey) Buzadam İstanbul	3	1	0	0	2	9	15	−6	3	
4	(Serbia) HK Vojvodina	3	0	0	0	3	3	27	−24	0	

Source: IIHF
(H) Host

All times are local (UTC+2).

14 October 2022; 16:30	Acroni Jesenice (Slovenia)	5–1 (1–0, 2–0, 2–1)	(Turkey) Buzadam İstanbul	Pala Hodegart, Asiago; Attendance: 100

Game reference
8 min	Penalties	20 min
46	Shots	22

14 October 2022; 20:30	HK Vojvodina (Serbia)	1–14 (0–2, 1–7, 0–5)	(Italy) Asiago Hockey	Pala Hodegart, Asiago; Attendance: 600

Game reference
10 min	Penalties	4 min
6	Shots	56

15 October 2022; 16:30	HK Vojvodina (Serbia)	1–7 (1–1, 0–3, 0–3)	(Slovenia) Acroni Jesenice	Pala Hodegart, Asiago; Attendance: 163

Game reference
8 min	Penalties	29 min
12	Shots	60

15 October 2022; 20:30	Buzadam İstanbul (Turkey)	2–9 (1–2, 0–4, 1–3)	(Italy) Asiago Hockey	Pala Hodegart, Asiago; Attendance: 700

Game reference
10 min	Penalties	10 min
12	Shots	57

16 October 2022; 16:30	Buzadam İstanbul (Turkey)	6–1 (4–0, 2–0, 0–1)	(Serbia) HK Vojvodina	Pala Hodegart, Asiago; Attendance: 135

Game reference
12 min	Penalties	22 min
41	Shots	35

16 October 2022; 20:30	Asiago Hockey (Italy)	5–2 (2–1, 2–0, 1–1)	(Slovenia) Acroni Jesenice	Pala Hodegart, Asiago; Attendance: 1,000

Game reference
10 min	Penalties	18 min
23	Shots	13

=== Ranking of second-placed teams ===
Pos	Grp	Team	Pld	W	OTW	OTL	L	GF	GA	GD	Pts	Qualification
1	D	(Slovenia) Acroni Jesenice	3	2	0	0	1	14	7	+7	6	Third round
2	C	(Romania) SC Miercurea Ciuc	3	2	0	0	1	11	6	+5	6	

Rules for classification: 1) points; 2) goal difference; 3) goals scored.

== Third round ==
=== Group E ===
The Group E tournament was played in Cardiff, Great Britain, from 18 to 20 November 2022.

Pos	Team	Pld	W	OTW	OTL	L	GF	GA	GD	Pts	Qualification
1	(United Kingdom) Cardiff Devils (H)	3	3	0	0	0	11	3	+8	9	Final
2	(France) Ducs d'Angers	3	2	0	0	1	7	4	+3	6	Final
3	(Slovenia) Acroni Jesenice	3	0	1	0	2	4	9	−5	2	
4	(Latvia) HK Zemgale/LLU	3	0	0	1	2	4	10	−6	1	

Source: IIHF
(H) Host

All times are local (UTC±0).

18 November 2022; 16:00	HK Zemgale/LLU (Latvia)	2–3 OT (0–0, 1–0, 1–2) (OT: 0–1)	(Slovenia) Acroni Jesenice	Ice Arena Wales, Cardiff; Attendance: 546

Game reference
Ēriks Vītols	Goalies	Antti Karjalainen	Referees: (United Kingdom) Stefan Hogarth (Ukraine) Andrii Kicha; Linesmen: (United Kingdom) Nathan Carmichael (United Kingdom) Ilia Kisil
10 min	Penalties	12 min	Referees: (United Kingdom) Stefan Hogarth (Ukraine) Andrii Kicha; Linesmen: (United Kingdom) Nathan Carmichael (United Kingdom) Ilia Kisil
29	Shots	38	Referees: (United Kingdom) Stefan Hogarth (Ukraine) Andrii Kicha; Linesmen: (United Kingdom) Nathan Carmichael (United Kingdom) Ilia Kisil

18 November 2022; 19:30	Cardiff Devils (United Kingdom)	3–1 (0–0, 2–1, 1–0)	(France) Ducs d'Angers	Ice Arena Wales, Cardiff; Attendance: 1,871

Game reference
Taran Kozun	Goalies	Evan Cowley	Referees: (Slovakia) Juraj Konc (Poland) Krzysztof Kozłowski; Linesmen: (United Kingdom) Ryan Fraley (United Kingdom) Scott Rodger
2 min	Penalties	10 min	Referees: (Slovakia) Juraj Konc (Poland) Krzysztof Kozłowski; Linesmen: (United Kingdom) Ryan Fraley (United Kingdom) Scott Rodger
41	Shots	16	Referees: (Slovakia) Juraj Konc (Poland) Krzysztof Kozłowski; Linesmen: (United Kingdom) Ryan Fraley (United Kingdom) Scott Rodger

19 November 2022; 15:30	HK Zemgale/LLU (Latvia)	0–2 (0–0, 0–1, 0–1)	(France) Ducs d'Angers	Ice Arena Wales, Cardiff; Attendance: 350

Game reference
Ēriks Vītols	Goalies	Evan Cowley	Referees: (Ukraine) Andrii Kicha (Poland) Krzysztof Kozłowski; Linesmen: (United Kingdom) Robert Pullar (United Kingdom) Scott Rodger
6 min	Penalties	6 min	Referees: (Ukraine) Andrii Kicha (Poland) Krzysztof Kozłowski; Linesmen: (United Kingdom) Robert Pullar (United Kingdom) Scott Rodger
25	Shots	34	Referees: (Ukraine) Andrii Kicha (Poland) Krzysztof Kozłowski; Linesmen: (United Kingdom) Robert Pullar (United Kingdom) Scott Rodger

19 November 2022; 19:00	Acroni Jesenice (Slovenia)	0–3 (0–1, 0–1, 0–1)	(United Kingdom) Cardiff Devils	Ice Arena Wales, Cardiff; Attendance: 2,014

Game reference
Antti Karjalainen	Goalies	Ben Bowns	Referees: (Slovakia) Juraj Konc (Italy) Omar Pinie; Linesmen: (United Kingdom) Ryan Fraley (United Kingdom) Ilia Kisil
6 min	Penalties	8 min	Referees: (Slovakia) Juraj Konc (Italy) Omar Pinie; Linesmen: (United Kingdom) Ryan Fraley (United Kingdom) Ilia Kisil
18	Shots	32	Referees: (Slovakia) Juraj Konc (Italy) Omar Pinie; Linesmen: (United Kingdom) Ryan Fraley (United Kingdom) Ilia Kisil

20 November 2022; 15:30	Ducs d'Angers (France)	4–1 (2–0, 1–1, 1–0)	(Slovenia) Acroni Jesenice	Ice Arena Wales, Cardiff; Attendance: 1,276

Game reference
Evan Cowley	Goalies	Antti Karjalainen	Referees: (United Kingdom) Stefan Hogarth (Poland) Krzysztof Kozłowski; Linesmen: (United Kingdom) Ryan Fraley (United Kingdom) Robert Pullar
2 min	Penalties	12 min	Referees: (United Kingdom) Stefan Hogarth (Poland) Krzysztof Kozłowski; Linesmen: (United Kingdom) Ryan Fraley (United Kingdom) Robert Pullar
48	Shots	16	Referees: (United Kingdom) Stefan Hogarth (Poland) Krzysztof Kozłowski; Linesmen: (United Kingdom) Ryan Fraley (United Kingdom) Robert Pullar

20 November 2022; 19:00	Cardiff Devils (United Kingdom)	5–2 (3–1, 1–0, 1–1)	(Latvia) HK Zemgale/LLU	Ice Arena Wales, Cardiff; Attendance: 2,008

Game reference
Ben Bowns	Goalies	Rihards Cimermanis; Mariuss Bajaruns-Galejs	Referees: (Slovakia) Juraj Konc (Italy) Omar Pinie; Linesmen: (United Kingdom) Nathan Carmichael (United Kingdom) Scott Rodger
24 min	Penalties	22 min	Referees: (Slovakia) Juraj Konc (Italy) Omar Pinie; Linesmen: (United Kingdom) Nathan Carmichael (United Kingdom) Scott Rodger
40	Shots	25	Referees: (Slovakia) Juraj Konc (Italy) Omar Pinie; Linesmen: (United Kingdom) Nathan Carmichael (United Kingdom) Scott Rodger

=== Group F ===
The Group F tournament was played in Nitra, Slovakia, from 18 to 20 November 2022.

Pos	Team	Pld	W	OTW	OTL	L	GF	GA	GD	Pts	Qualification
1	(Slovakia) HK Nitra (H)	3	3	0	0	0	14	6	+8	9	Final
2	(Italy) Asiago Hockey	3	2	0	0	1	11	8	+3	6	Final
3	(Poland) Unia Oświęcim	3	1	0	0	2	8	8	0	3	
4	(Ukraine) HC Kremenchuk	3	0	0	0	3	5	16	−11	0	

Source: IIHF
(H) Host

All times are local (UTC+1).

18 November 2022; 14:30	Unia Oświęcim (Poland)	4–2 (0–1, 1–0, 3–1)	(Ukraine) HC Kremenchuk	Tipsport Aréna, Nitra; Attendance: 545

Game reference
13 min	Penalties	17 min
38	Shots	18

18 November 2022; 18:00	HK Nitra (Slovakia)	5–2 (3–0, 1–2, 1–0)	(Italy) Asiago Hockey	Tipsport Aréna, Nitra; Attendance: 1,579

Game reference
8 min	Penalties	10 min
38	Shots	23

19 November 2022; 14:30	Asiago Hockey (Italy)	4–3 (1–1, 2–0, 1–2)	(Poland) Unia Oświęcim	Tipsport Aréna, Nitra; Attendance: 440

Game reference
12 min	Penalties	8 min
17	Shots	32

19 November 2022; 18:00	HK Nitra (Slovakia)	7–3 (2–1, 1–1, 4–1)	(Ukraine) HC Kremenchuk	Tipsport Aréna, Nitra; Attendance: 1,690

Game reference
35 min	Penalties	14 min
44	Shots	25

20 November 2022; 14:30	HC Kremenchuk (Ukraine)	0–5 (0–2, 0–2, 0–1)	(Italy) Asiago Hockey	Tipsport Aréna, Nitra

Game reference
14 min	Penalties	12 min
25	Shots	42

20 November 2022; 18:00	Unia Oświęcim (Poland)	1–2 (0–0, 1–1, 0–1)	(Slovakia) HK Nitra	Tipsport Aréna, Nitra; Attendance: 1,837

Game reference
6 min	Penalties	10 min
32	Shots	25

== Final round ==
The final tournament was played in Angers, France, from 13 to 15 January 2023.

Pos	Team	Pld	W	OTW	OTL	L	GF	GA	GD	Pts	
1	(Slovakia) HK Nitra	3	2	1	0	0	11	7	+4	8	Continental Cup winners
2	(France) Ducs d'Angers (H)	3	0	1	2	0	6	7	−1	4 (Note: Cardiff Devils 1–2 (GWS) Ducs d'Angers)	
3	(United Kingdom) Cardiff Devils	3	1	0	1	1	10	6	+4	4	
4	(Italy) Asiago Hockey	3	0	1	0	2	7	14	−7	2	

Source: IIHF
(H) Host
Notes:

All times are local (UTC+1).

13 January 2023; 16:30	HK Nitra (Slovakia)	5–3 (2–0, 2–1, 1–2)	(Italy) Asiago Hockey	Angers IceParc, Angers; Attendance: 808

Game reference

Matt O'Connor
Goalies
Justin Fazio
Referees:
(France) Geoffrey Barcelo
(Switzerland) Stefan Hürlimann
Linesmen:
(France) Cyril Debuche
(France) Vincent Zede

Čederle (Krivošík, Buncis) (EA) – 07:00	1–0
Lacka (Knies, Drábek) – 09:09	2–0
	2–1	24:03 – Saracino (Casetti, Gazzola)
Hrnka (Green, Elmer) – 26:22	3–1
Pekarčík (Hrnka) – 36:04	4–1
	4–2	46:28 – McShane (Marchetti, Saracino)
	4–3	53:07 – Misley (Moncada)
Krivošík (Green) (SH, ENG) – 59:52	5–3

6 min
Penalties
2 min
36
Shots
33

13 January 2023; 20:00	Cardiff Devils (United Kingdom)	1–2 GWS (0–1, 0–0, 1–0) (OT: 0–0) (SO: 0–1)	(France) Ducs d'Angers	Angers IceParc, Angers; Attendance: 3,586

Game reference
Ben Bowns	Goalies	Evan Cowley	Referees: (Latvia) Uldis Bušs (Finland) Kristian Vikman; Linesmen: (France) Clément Gonçalves (Belgium) Frederic Monnaie
/ 0–1 / 12:44 – Halley (Charbonneau); Reid – 41:49 / 1–1			Referees: (Latvia) Uldis Bušs (Finland) Kristian Vikman; Linesmen: (France) Clément Gonçalves (Belgium) Frederic Monnaie
Reid; Sanford (miss); Cox (miss); Martin (miss); Waller (miss)	Shootout	(miss) Charbonneau; Halley; (miss) Bouvet; (miss) Giroux; Arms	Referees: (Latvia) Uldis Bušs (Finland) Kristian Vikman; Linesmen: (France) Clément Gonçalves (Belgium) Frederic Monnaie
6 min	Penalties	4 min	Referees: (Latvia) Uldis Bušs (Finland) Kristian Vikman; Linesmen: (France) Clément Gonçalves (Belgium) Frederic Monnaie
42	Shots	33	Referees: (Latvia) Uldis Bušs (Finland) Kristian Vikman; Linesmen: (France) Clément Gonçalves (Belgium) Frederic Monnaie

14 January 2023; 16:30	Cardiff Devils (United Kingdom)	7–1 (3–0, 1–1, 3–0)	(Italy) Asiago Hockey	Angers IceParc, Angers; Attendance: 913

Game reference

Taran Kozun
Goalies
Justin Fazio
Referees:
(Poland) Michał Baca
(France) Geoffrey Barcelo
Linesmen:
(France) Cyril Debuche
(France) Vincent Zede

Sanford (Thompson) – 00:31	1–0
Reid (Crandall, Penny) – 08:54	2–0
Waller (Thompson, Reid) (PP) – 12:46	3–0
	3–1	21:30 – Finoro (McShane, Misley)
Brittain (Waller, Crawford) – 21:44	4–1
Cox (Brittain, Sanford – 41:09	5–1
Waller (Brittain, Fournier) – 42:35	6–1
Fournier (Waller, Thompson) – 51:56	7–1

9 min
Penalties
8 min
35
Shots
32

14 January 2023; 20:00	Ducs d'Angers (France)	2–3 GWS (0–0, 0–1, 2–1) (OT: 0–0) (SO: 0–1)	(Slovakia) HK Nitra	Angers IceParc, Angers; Attendance: 3,586

Game reference

Evan Cowley
Goalies
Matt O'Connor
Referees:
(Switzerland) Stefan Hürlimann
(Finland) Kristian Vikman
Linesmen:
(Belgium) Frederic Monnaie
(Finland) Tommi Niittylä

	0–1	39:47 – Baláž (Krivošík, Green)
	0–2	45:11 – Gill
Charbonneau (Giroux) (PP) – 57:53	1–2
Meija (EA) – 58:32	2–2

Halley (miss)
Charbonneau
Harms (miss)
Torquato
Giroux (miss)
Shootout
Gill
Krivošík
Lacka
(miss) Elmer
10 min
Penalties
6 min
37
Shots
34

15 January 2023; 14:00	HK Nitra (Slovakia)	3–2 (3–0, 0–1, 0–1)	(United Kingdom) Cardiff Devils	Angers IceParc, Angers; Attendance: 1,095

Game reference

Libor Kašík
Goalies
Taran Kozun
Referees:
(Switzerland) Stefan Hürlimann
(Finland) Kristian Vikman
Linesmen:
(France) Clément Gonçalves
(Finland) Tommi Niittylä

Krivošík (Gill, Green) – 14:36	1–0
Lucka (Pekarčík) – 15:53	2–0
Tvrdoň – 19:14	3–0
	3–1	33:39 – Sanford
	3–2	46:25 – Cox (Penny)

27 min
Penalties
8 min
33
Shots
47

15 January 2023; 17:30	Asiago Hockey (Italy)	3–2 OT (2–0, 0–2, 0–0) (OT: 1–0)	(France) Ducs d'Angers	Angers IceParc, Angers; Attendance: 3,586

Game reference

Justin Fazio
Goalies
Evan Cowley
Referees:
(Poland) Michał Baca
(Latvia) Uldis Bušs
Linesmen:
(France) Cyril Debuche
(Belgium) Frederic Monnaie

Saracino (McShane, Salinitri) (PP) – 05:22	1–0
McShane (Gazzola, Finoro) – 19:48	2–0
	2–1	23:33 – Giroux (Charbonneau) (PP)
	2–2	37:10 – Charbonneau (Manning, Halley)
Finoro (McShane, Marchetti) – 60:25	3–2

16 min
Penalties
12 min
41
Shots
35

== See also ==
- 2022–23 Champions Hockey League
