= Zeytinburnu Ice Rink =

Ice skating venue in Istanbul, Turkey

- Interactive map of Zeytinburnu Ice Rink
- Location: Zeytinburnu, Istanbul Province, Turkey
- Coordinates: 40.99604°N 28.89452°E
- Owner: Municipality of Zeytinburnu

Construction
- Groundbreaking: 2017
- Opened: 29 January 2022; 4 years ago

Tenant
- Zeytinburnu Belediyespor

Website
- buzadasi.com

Zeytinburnu Ice Rink (Turkish: Zeytinburnu Buz Adası), is an indoor ice skating and hockey rink located at Zeytinburnu district in Istanbul, Turkey. Owned by the Municipality of Zeytinburnu, it was opened in 2022.

== History ==
The Municipality of Zeytinburnu established an ice hockey team with problematic street youngsters as a social project in 2010, and erected two mobile ice rinks of size 400 m^{2} (4,300 sq ft) each.

Upon the successful development of the ice hockey team, the municipality projected the building of an ice rink. The construction began in 2017 with the cooperation of Spor Toto Corp., and the support of the Ministry of Youth and Sports. It was planned that the construction completes in 2018. The venue was opened on 29 January 2022.

== Overview ==
The ice rink building is located on Prof. Dr. Turan Güneş Cad. 67a at Veliefendi neighborhood in Zeytinburnu, Istanbul. It is owned and operated by the Municipality of Zeytinburnu.

Built on 37,000 m^{2} (400,000 sq ft) area, it is the biggest ice rink complex in Istanbul. It consists of two Olympic-sized ice rinks of size 1,800 m^{2} (19,000 sq ft) in two floors, one for competitions and one for trainings, rooms for coaches and referees, a fittness hall, an aerobics hall, a library, a conference room and a cafeteria. The ice rink's stand has 2,756 seat capacity. The facility has also 24 accommodation rooms with 48 beds

There are a covered parking lot with a capacity for 157 cars, and an open-air parking lot, which are subject to a fee.

The venue is home to the ice hockey team of Zeytinburnu Belediyespor, and hosts the matches of the Turkish Ice Hockey Super League and Turkish Women's Ice Hockey League.

== International events hosted ==
2022

- 2022 IIHF World U18 Championship Division IIi A, 11–17 April
- 2022–23 IIHF Continental Cup Group B, 23–25 September
- 2022 Bosphorus Istanbul Figure Skating Cup, 29 November–3 December

2023

- 2023 IIHF World Championship Division II B, 17–23 April
- 2023 World Junior Ice Hockey Championships – Division III, 26 January–2 February

2024

- 2024 IIHF World U18 Championship Division III A, 4–10 March

2025

- 2025 IIHF World Women's U18 Championship Division II B 18–23 January
- 2025 World Junior Ice Hockey Championships – Division III A, 27 January–2 February
- 2025 IIHF World Championship Division III A, 21–27 April
