= Bosnia and Herzegovina men's national junior ice hockey team =

Under 20 Team

Bosnia and Herzegovina
- Association: Bosnia and Herzegovina Ice Hockey Federation
- Head coach: (Bosnia and Herzegovina) Nermin Alic
- Assistants: (Canada) Ross MacLean
- Captain: Tarik Mrkva
- Top scorer: Nikko Gaković (16)
- Most points: Tarik Mrkva (20)
- Team colors
- IIHF code: BIH

First international
- Croatia 10 – 3 Bosnia and Herzegovina (Novi Sad, Serbia; 13 November 2021)

Biggest win
- Bosnia and Herzegovina 9 – 2 South Africa (Sarajevo, Bosnia and Herzegovina; 26 January 2024)

Biggest defeat
- Chinese Taipei 18 – 1 Bosnia and Herzegovina (Istanbul, Turkey; 31 January 2025)

IIHF World Junior Championship
- Appearances: 5 (first in 2022)
- Best result: 39th (2025)

International record (W–L–T)
- 7–22–0

The Bosnia and Herzegovina men's national junior ice hockey team is the national under-20 ice hockey team in Bosnia and Herzegovina. The team represents Bosnia and Herzegovina at the International Ice Hockey Federation's IIHF World Junior Championship. The team debuted at the 2022 World Junior Championships, alongside Bosnia and Herzegovina's men's under-18 team and women's team, and won their first promotion in 2024.

== International competitions ==
=== World Junior Championships ===
- 2022 World Junior Championships — 40th overall (6th in Division III)
- 2023 World Junior Championships — 41st overall (7th in Division III)
- 2024 World Junior Championships — 41st overall (1st in Division III B)
- 2025 World Junior Championships — 39th overall (5th in Division III A)
- 2026 World Junior Championships — 40th overall (6th in Division III A)
