= 2025 World Junior Ice Hockey Championships – Division III =

International youth ice hockey tournament

2025 IIHF U20 World Championship Division III
Tournament details
- Host countries: Turkey; Thailand
- Venues: 2 (in 2 host cities)
- Dates: 27 January – 2 February 2025; 11–14 December 2024
- Teams: 10

The 2025 World Junior Ice Hockey Championship Division III consisted of two international under-20 ice hockey tournaments organized by the International Ice Hockey Federation. Division III A represents the sixth tier and Division III B the seventh tier of the IIHF World Junior Championship. For each tier's tournament, the first-placed team was promoted to the next higher division, while the bottom-placed team from Group A was relegated to Group B.

To be eligible as a junior player in these tournaments, a player couldn't be born earlier than 2005.

== Division III A ==
2025 IIHF U20 World Championship Division III A

Tournament details
- Host country: Turkey
- City: Istanbul
- Venue: 1 (in 1 host city)
- Dates: 27 January – 2 February 2025
- Teams: 6

Tournament statistics
- Games played: 15
- Goals scored: 152 (10.13 per game)
- Attendance: 5,543 (370 per game)
- Scoring leader: (Chinese Taipei) Peng Mo (19 points)

Official website
- www.iihf.com

The Division III A tournament was played in Istanbul, Turkey, from 27 January to 2 February 2025.

=== Participating teams ===
Team	Qualification
Chinese Taipei	placed 6th in Division II B last year and were relegated
New Zealand	placed 2nd in Division III A last year
Bulgaria	placed 3rd in Division III A last year
Turkey (hosts)	placed 4th in Division III A last year
Mexico	placed 5th in Division III A last year
Bosnia and Herzegovina	placed 1st in Division III B last year and were promoted

=== Standings ===
Pos	Team	Pld	W	OTW	OTL	L	GF	GA	GD	Pts	Promotion or relegation
1	New Zealand	5	5	0	0	0	32	8	+24	15	Promotion to the 2026 Division II B
2	Chinese Taipei	5	4	0	0	1	39	11	+28	12	
3	Bulgaria	5	3	0	0	2	29	17	+12	9	
4	Turkey (H)	5	2	0	0	3	27	31	−4	6	
5	Bosnia and Herzegovina	5	1	0	0	4	12	54	−42	3	
6	Mexico	5	0	0	0	5	13	31	−18	0	Relegation to the 2026 Division III B

Source: IIHF
Rules for classification: 1) points; 2) head-to-head points; 3) head-to-head goal difference; 4) head-to-head number of goals scored; 5) result against closest best-ranked team outside tied teams; 6) result against second-best-ranked team outside tied teams; 7) seeding before tournament.
(H) Host

=== Results ===
All times are local (Turkey Time – UTC+3).

27 January 2025; 13:00	Bulgaria	3–7 (2–3, 1–1, 0–3)	Chinese Taipei	Zeytinburnu Ice Rink, Istanbul; Attendance: 51

Game reference

Kaloyan Stoyanov
Goalies
Chen Tai-Yu
Referee:
(Ukraine) Oleg Serebryakov
Linesmen:
(Turkey) Alkan Kilinç
(Spain) Carlos Trobajo

	0–1	00:52 – Chi K. (Wang Y., Chen Y.)
	0–2	07:38 – Peng (Chen Y.)
Stanimirov (Kozhuharov, Dikov) – 11:04	1–2
Dikov (Gyurkov, Peychev) – 11:54	2–2
	2–3	12:23 – Chang (Wang K.)
	2–4	31:56 – Lin (Yang) (PP)
Stanimirov (Stamenov) – 33:40	3–4
	3–5	43:10 – Peng (Wang Y., Chen Y.) (PP)
	3–6	45:36 – Chi K. (Peng)
	3–7	50:11 – Chen C. (Wang Y.)

16 min
Penalties
14 min
28
Shots
42

27 January 2025; 16:30	New Zealand	5–0 (0–0, 2–0, 3–0)	Mexico	Zeytinburnu Ice Rink, Istanbul; Attendance: 50

Game reference

Joel Gerard
Goalies
Santiago Cucuraqui
Referee:
(Turkey) Serkan Kocakara
Linesmen:
(China) Liu Ren
(Belgium) Maarten van den Acker

MacDonald (Ruski-Jones) (SH) – 27:48	1–0
Carey (Ruski-Jones, Koptev) (PP) – 32:03	2–0
MacDonald (Dalmatau, Blair) (SH) – 44:56	3–0
Ruski-Jones (MacDonald, Blair) – 47:38	4–0
Murray (Ruski-Jones, Koptev) – 52:40	5–0

20 min
Penalties
12 min
42
Shots
18

27 January 2025; 20:00	Bosnia and Herzegovina	1–9 (0–1, 0–3, 1–5)	Turkey	Zeytinburnu Ice Rink, Istanbul; Attendance: 631

Game reference

Karim Ahmetovski
Amor Sacic
Goalies
Kayra Aydos
Yusuf Balli
Referee:
(Belgium) Tim Tzirtziganis
Linesmen:
(Finland) Daniel Lindblom
(Netherlands) Bram Zwarthoed

	0–1	11:41 – Gok (SH)
	0–2	22:49 – Inandi (Odabaş)
	0–3	28:50 – Altay (Yavuz, Meydanci)
	0–4	32:32 – Inandi (Odabaş)
	0–5	47:07 – Yavuz (Tinaz, Inandi) (PP)
	0–6	49:06 – Yavuz (Tinaz, Girgin) (PP)
	0–7	51:29 – Altay (Tinaz) (SH)
Mrkva (Vucinic) – 52:33	1–7
	1–8	53:56 – Inandi (Karadag)
	1–9	58:17 – Karadag (Inandi, Odabaş)

8 min
Penalties
18 min
16
Shots
59

28 January 2025; 13:00	New Zealand	5–0 (1–0, 3–0, 1–0)	Bulgaria	Zeytinburnu Ice Rink, Istanbul; Attendance: 93

Game reference

Joel Gerard
Goalies
Nikola Stefanov
Referee:
(Turkey) Serkan Kocakara
Linesmen:
(Turkey) Alkan Kilinç
(Spain) Carlos Trobajo

Bary (Wimmer) – 03:01	1–0
Blair (Audas, Carey) – 25:01	2–0
Carey (Murray) – 29:01	3–0
Ruski-Jones (Audas, MacDonald) – 35:38	4–0
Allen (Wimmer, Blair) – 43:20	5–0

2 min
Penalties
4 min
37
Shots
18

28 January 2025; 16:30	Mexico	4–6 (0–2, 2–2, 2–2)	Bosnia and Herzegovina	Zeytinburnu Ice Rink, Istanbul; Attendance: 68

Game reference

Santiago Cucuraqui
Goalies
Karim Ahmetovski
Referee:
(Ukraine) Oleg Serebryakov
Linesmen:
(Turkey) Muhaammed Aksakal
(Belgium) Maarten van den Acker

	0–1	03:06 – Vucinic (Mrkva, Drnda) (PP)
	0–2	04:07 – Capin
Couch (Potts) – 28:02	1–2
JP. Briseno (Parra) – 29:55	2–2
	2–3	34:56 – Mrkva (Drnda)
	2–4	39:33 – Drnda (Capin, Mrkva)
JP. Briseno (Parra) – 42:58	3–4
	3–5	47:47 – S. Koronja (Vulovic, K. Koronja)
Parra (JP. Briseno, P. Briseno) – 48:38	4–5
	4–6	56:19 – Drnda (Mrkva, Capin) (PP)

12 min
Penalties
4 min
35
Shots
19

28 January 2025; 20:00	Chinese Taipei	8–2 (4–2, 1–0, 3–0)	Turkey	Zeytinburnu Ice Rink, Istanbul; Attendance: 850

Game reference

Chen Tai-Yu
Kao Hao-Hsuan
Goalies
Kayra Aydos
Referee:
(Australia) Casper Russelhuber
Linesmen:
(Finland) Daniel Lindblom
(China) Liu Ren

	0–1	01:52 – Meydanci (Altay, Yavuz)
Chang (Liu, Chen Y.) – 04:41	1–1
Chi K. (Peng Mo, Wang Y.) – 11:54	2–1
Liu (Chang) – 15:07	3–1
	3–2	18:32 – Bahadir (Yayilkan) (SH)
Chi K. (Peng Mo, Hung) (PP) – 19:33	4–2
Liu (Wang Y., Chen C.) (PP) – 28:41	5–2
Chang (Chen Y., Peng Mo) (PP) – 42:38	6–2
Lin (Peng K.) – 46:50	7–2
Chen C. (Peng Mo, Chi K.) (PP) – 56:13	8–2

14 min
Penalties
55 min
47
Shots
21

30 January 2025; 13:00	Chinese Taipei	5–1 (2–1, 2–0, 1–0)	Mexico	Zeytinburnu Ice Rink, Istanbul; Attendance: 94

Game reference

Kao Hao-Hsuan
Goalies
Santiago Cucuraqui
Referee:
(Ukraine) Oleg Serebryakov
Linesmen:
(China) Liu Ren
(Belgium) Maarten van den Acker

	0–1	04:35 – Natenzon (Arzaluz Molina, Loria)
Chi K. (Chen C., Peng Mo) – 13:37	1–1
Liu (Wang K.) – 16:13	2–1
Liu (Peng Mo, Wu) (PP) – 32:33	3–1
Chen C. (Peng Mo) – 39:02	4–1
Chen C. (Peng Mo, Wang Y.) (PP) – 53:38	5–1

4 min
Penalties
4 min
37
Shots
16

30 January 2025; 16:30	New Zealand	12–4 (6–1, 5–2, 1–1)	Bosnia and Herzegovina	Zeytinburnu Ice Rink, Istanbul; Attendance: 87

Game reference

Caleb Price
Goalies
Karim Ahmetovski
Amor Sacic
Referee:
(Australia) Casper Russelhuber
Linesmen:
(Turkey) Muhaammed Aksakal
(Finland) Daniel Lindblom

Ruski-Jones (Koptev, MacDonald) – 01:29	1–0
Blair (Murray, Lewis) (PP) – 04:42	2–0
Audas (Carey) – 07:17	3–0
Paterson – 08:22	4–0
Dalmatau (Carey, Audas) (PP) – 15:30	5–0
	5–1	16:24 – Mrkva (Vucinic, Capin)
Dalmatau (Carey, Koptev) (PP) – 17:49	6–1
Campbell (Lewis, Boniface) – 22:45	7–1
Campbell (Lewis, Bary) – 23:37	8–1
	8–2	23:56 – Mrkva (Capin, Vucinic)
	8–3	32:51 – Smajlovic (Vucinic, Drnda) (PP)
Carey (Dalmatau, Blair) – 32:59	9–3
Allen (Wimmer, Chamberlin) – 36:27	10–3
Carey (Paterson) – 37:35	11–3
MacDonald (Lewis, Campbell) – 48:44	12–3
	12–4	59:59 – Capin (Drnda, Mrkva)

6 min
Penalties
14 min
51
Shots
17

30 January 2025; 20:00	Bulgaria	9–4 (3–0, 3–2, 3–2)	Turkey	Zeytinburnu Ice Rink, Istanbul; Attendance: TBA

Game reference

Nikola Stefanov
Goalies
Kayra Aydos
Yusuf Balli
Referee:
(Belgium) Tim Tzirtziganis
Linesmen:
(Spain) Carlos Trobajo
(Netherlands) Bram Zwarthoed

Pandilov (Stanimirov) – 00:44	1–0
Stanimirov – 15:38	2–0
McMullin (Todorov) – 18:44	3–0
Peychev (Kozhuharov, Stefanov) (SH) – 25:36	4–0
	4–1	29:47 – Yayilkan (Meydanci)
Stanimirov (Tomov, Peychev) – 35:00	5–1
	5–2	37:06 – Odabaş (Karadag) (SH)
Stanimirov (Pandilov, Dikov) (PP) – 37:28	6–2
Kozhuharov (Pandilov, Stanimirov) (PP) – 55:14	7–2
McMullin (EN) – 57:17	8–2
	8–3	58:07 – Yayilkan
Pandilov (McMullin) – 58:57	9–3
	9–4	59:50 – Yavuz (Meydanci)

6 min
Penalties
6 min
29
Shots
39

31 January 2025; 13:00	Bosnia and Herzegovina	1–18 (0–1, 0–5, 1–12)	Chinese Taipei	Zeytinburnu Ice Rink, Istanbul; Attendance: 71

Game reference

Amor Sacic
Goalies
Kao Hao-Hsuan
Referee:
(Turkey) Serkan Kocakara
Linesmen:
(Turkey) Muhaammed Aksakal
(China) Liu Ren

	0–1	04:20 – Lin (Peng K., Chen T.C)
	0–2	23:30 – Peng Mo (Wang Y., Chen C.)
	0–3	28:00 – Wang Y. (Chi, Chen C.)
	0–4	29:55 – Peng Mo (Chen C.)
	0–5	35:17 – Peng Mo (Wu)
	0–6	38:08 – Liu (Chen Y., Peng Mo) (PP2)
	0–7	40:43 – Wu (Chen Y., Wang K.) (PP)
	0–8	42:24 – Chen C. (Chi, Peng Mo)
	0–9	42:58 – Wang K. (Chen Y.)
	0–10	43:45 – Chen C.
	0–11	45:18 – Liu
Mrkva (Capin, Silajdzic) – 48:45	1–11
	1–12	50:22 – Peng K.
	1–13	50:47 – Chi (Wang Y., Peng Mo)
	1–14	51:07 – Liu (Chang)
	1–15	53:13 – Wu – (Wang K., Chen Y.) (PP2)
	1–16	54:11 – Chen C. (Liu, Peng Mo)
	1–17	58:51 – Chi (Liu)
	1–18	59:18 – Yang (Ou, Peng K.)

18 min
Penalties
4 min
6
Shots
50

31 January 2025; 16:30	Mexico	1–6 (0–3, 0–2, 1–1)	Bulgaria	Zeytinburnu Ice Rink, Istanbul; Attendance: 153

Game reference

Santiago Cucuraqui
Goalies
Nikola Stefanov
Referee:
(Belgium) Tim Tzirtziganis
Linesmen:
(Turkey) Alkan Kilinç
(Finland) Daniel Lindblom

	0–1	05:14 – Stanimirov (Todorov, D. Mladenov)
	0–2	07:51 – Pandilov (Stanimirov)
	0–3	10:21 – Gyurkov (Stanimirov, Tomov)
	0–4	28:26 – Stanimirov (Stamenov, Dikov) (PP)
	0–5	34:56 – Kozhuharov (D. Mladenov, Stanimirov)
Potts (Loria, F. Briseno) (PP) – 48:42	1–5
	1–6	57:42 – Dikov (Stefanov)

6 min
Penalties
4 min
12
Shots
36

31 January 2025; 20:00	Turkey	3–6 (0–2, 2–2, 1–2)	New Zealand	Zeytinburnu Ice Rink, Istanbul; Attendance: 1,206

Game reference

Kayra Aydos
Yusuf Balli
Goalies
Joel Gerard
Referee:
(Australia) Casper Russelhuber
Linesmen:
(Netherlands) Bram Zwarthoed
(Belgium) Maarten van den Acker

	0–1	03:07 – Jansen Middleton (Audas, Allen)
	0–2	18:24 – Dalmatau (Audas, Carey) (PP)
	0–3	20:09 – Audas (Carey)
Tinaz (Yayilkan, Atkin) – 24:09	1–3
Yavuz (Meydanci, Odabaş) – 30:20	2–3
	2–4	37:52 – MacDonald (Audas, Carey) (EA)
Odabaş (Karadag, Yayilkan) (PP) – 52:03	3–4
	3–5	58:09 – Dalmatau (Koptev, Carey) (EN)
	3–6	58:41 – MacDonald (Paterson)

6 min
Penalties
8 min
22
Shots
23

2 February 2025; 13:00	Bulgaria	11–0 (4–0, 3–0, 4–0)	Bosnia and Herzegovina	Zeytinburnu Ice Rink, Istanbul; Attendance: 135

Game reference

Kaloyan Stoyanov
Goalies
Karim Ahmetovski
Amor Sacic
Referee:
(Ukraine) Oleg Serebryakov
Linesmen:
(Turkey) Muhaammed Aksakal
(Belgium) Maarten van den Acker

Stanimirov (Pandilov) – 00:36	1–0
Peychev (Krushichki, Kozhuharov) – 02:19	2–0
Peychev (Kozhuharov, Tomov) – 05:50	3–0
Stanimirov (Tomov) – 09:59	4–0
Stanimirov (Gyurkov, Stamenov) – 35:19	5–0
Kozhuharov (D. Mladenov) – 37:07	6–0
Stanimirov (Dikov, Pandilov) (PP) – 39:09	7–0
Aleksandrov – 47:40	8–0
Kozhuharov (Dikov, Stamenov) (PP) – 52:14	9–0
Pandilov (McMullin, Mitrikov) – 56:14	10–0
Kozhuharov (Dikov, Stamenov) (PP) – 57:25	11–0

4 min
Penalties
31 min
33
Shots
17

2 February 2025; 16:30	Chinese Taipei	1–4 (1–2, 0–1, 0–1)	New Zealand	Zeytinburnu Ice Rink, Istanbul; Attendance: 302

Game reference

Kao Hao-Hsuan
Goalies
Joel Gerard
Referee:
(Belgium) Tim Tzirtziganis
Linesmen:
(Turkey) Alkan Kilinç
(Finland) Daniel Lindblom

	0–1	06:21 – Carey (Dalmatau, Koptev)
Peng Mo (PS) – 09:01	1–1
	1–2	14:04 – Ruski-Jones (Chamberlin, Paterson)
	1–3	35:57 – Dalmatau (Carey, Ruski-Jones) (PP)
	1–4	45:51 – Carey (Murray)

4 min
Penalties
2 min
12
Shots
21

2 February 2025; 20:00	Turkey	9–7 (4–4, 2–3, 3–0)	Mexico	Zeytinburnu Ice Rink, Istanbul; Attendance: 1,752

Game reference

Kayra Aydos
Yusuf Balli
Goalies
Santiago Cucuraqui
Referee:
(Australia) Casper Russelhuber
Linesmen:
(Spain) Carlos Trobajo
(Netherlands) Bram Zwarthoed

Yavuz (Atkin) – 02:47	1–0
	1–1	03:58 – Natenzon (Morosoli, Hernandez)
	1–2	10:06 – Hernandez (P. Briseno)
Odabaş (Atkin, Inandi) – 13:26	2–2
	2–3	13:49 – Borja (Loria, Morosoli)
Yavuz (Meydanci, Atkin) – 16:01	3–3
Karadag (Odabaş) (SH) – 17:44	4–3
	4–4	18:49 – Borja (Potts, F. Briseno) (PP2)
	4–5	22:48 – F. Briseno (Couoh, Potts)
Odabaş (Karadag, Atkin) (PP) – 31:05	5–5
	5–6	32:20 – Potts (F. Briseno, Lorenzana)
Inandi (Odabaş) – 33:36	6–6
	6–7	35:40 – JP. Briseno (P. Briseno)
Meydanci (Bahadir) – 40:39	7–7
Tinaz (Yayilkan, Atkin) – 42:00	8–7
Yayilkan (EN) – 57:33	9–7

10 min
Penalties
10 min
38
Shots
40

=== Statistics ===
==== Top 10 scorers ====
Pos	Player	Country	GP	G	A	Pts	+/–	PIM
1	Peng Mo	Chinese Taipei	5	6	13	19	+11	4
2	Aleksandar Stanimirov	Bulgaria	5	11	5	16	+7	0
3	Jacob Carey	New Zealand	5	6	9	15	+10	0
4	Chen Chiung-Yuan	Chinese Taipei	5	7	5	12	+11	2
5	Chi Kai-Yuan	Chinese Taipei	5	7	3	10	+12	2
5	Liu Kuan-Ting	Chinese Taipei	5	7	3	10	+5	2
7	Ege Odabaş	Turkey	5	4	6	10	–2	0
8	Aleksandar Kozhuharov	Bulgaria	5	5	4	9	+2	0
8	Tarik Mrkva	Bosnia and Herzegovina	5	5	4	9	−2	8
10	Wang Yi-An	Chinese Taipei	5	1	8	9	+11	0

GP = Games played; G = Goals; A = Assists; Pts = Points; +/− = P Plus–minus; PIM = Penalties In Minutes
Source: IIHF

==== Goaltending leaders ====
(minimum 40% team's total ice time)

Pos	Player	Country	TOI	GA	Sv%	GAA	SO
1	Joel Gerard	New Zealand	240:00	3	94.29	1.00	2
2	Nikola Stefanov	Bulgaria	180:00	10	88.64	3.33	0
3	Kaloyan Stoyanov	Bulgaria	120:00	7	88.14	3.50	1
4	Kao Hao-Hsuan	Chinese Taipei	185:39	6	86.67	1.94	0
5	Santiago Cucuraqui	Mexico	298:34	30	82.35	6.03	0

TOI = Time on ice (minutes:seconds); GA = Goals against; GAA = Goals against average; Sv% = Save percentage; SO = Shutouts
Source: IIHF

==== Best Players Selected by the Directorate ====
- Goaltender: (New Zealand) Joel Gerard
- Defenceman: (Chinese Taipei) Peng Mo
- Forward: (New Zealand) Jacob Carey

Source: IIHF

== Division III B ==
2025 IIHF U20 World Championship Division III B

Tournament details
- Host country: Thailand
- City: Bangkok
- Venue: 1 (in 1 host city)
- Dates: 11–14 December 2024
- Teams: 4

Tournament statistics
- Games played: 6
- Goals scored: 53 (8.83 per game)
- Attendance: 1,494 (249 per game)
- Scoring leader: (Thailand) Natchayatorn Yannakornthanapunt (7 points)

Official website
- www.iihf.com

The Division III B tournament was played in Bangkok, Thailand, from 11 to 14 December 2024.

=== Participating teams ===
Team	Qualification
Kyrgyzstan	placed 6th in Division III A last year and were relegated
Luxembourg	placed 2nd in Division III B last year
South Africa	placed 3rd in Division III B last year
Thailand (hosts)	first participation in World Championship

=== Standings ===
Pos	Team	Pld	W	OTW	OTL	L	GF	GA	GD	Pts	Promotion
1	Thailand (H)	3	3	0	0	0	19	5	+14	9	Promotion to the 2026 Division III A
2	Kyrgyzstan	3	2	0	0	1	14	9	+5	6	
3	South Africa	3	0	1	0	2	11	21	−10	2	
4	Luxembourg	3	0	0	1	2	9	18	−9	1	

Source: IIHF
Rules for classification: 1) points; 2) head-to-head points; 3) head-to-head goal difference; 4) head-to-head number of goals scored; 5) result against closest best-ranked team outside tied teams; 6) result against second-best-ranked team outside tied teams; 7) seeding before tournament.
(H) Host

=== Results ===
All times are local (Indochina Time – UTC+7).

11 December 2024; 16:00	Kyrgyzstan	7–2 (1–0, 3–2, 3–0)	South Africa	Bangkok International Ice Hockey Arena, Bangkok; Attendance: 110

Game reference

Emir Bolsunbekov
Goalies
Nico Janse van Rensburg
Referee:
(Chinese Taipei) Shen Yen-Chin
Linesmen:
(New Zealand) Edward Howard
(Thailand) Teerasak Rattanachot

Kalchaev (Esenov, Sapitov) – 16:36	1–0
Bem (Kalchaev, Nuraliev) – 28:00	2–0
Leshchenko (Ali-Askarov) – 29:56 (PP)	3–0
	3–1	30:42 – Levin (Bate, Levi)
Sapitov (Shamshybekov, Kalchaev) – 31:34	4–1
	4–2	37:26 – Levin (PS)
Sulaimanov (Ali-Askarov) – 47:30	5–2
Shumakov (Supokhunov) – 51:06	6–2
Sapitov (Shumakov) – 59:30	7–2

8 min
Penalties
8 min
38
Shots
18

11 December 2024; 19:30	Luxembourg	1–6 (1–2, 0–1, 0–3)	Thailand	Bangkok International Ice Hockey Arena, Bangkok; Attendance: 223

Game reference

Baptiste Franck
Goalies
Vijak Niyomvong
Referee:
(Indonesia) Heru Wardana
Linesmen:
(France) Nicolas Constantineau
(Chinese Taipei) Hung Chi-Lun

Armuth (Vincens) – 1:14 (PP)	1–0
	1–1	6:33 – Patong (Kulthanthorn) (PP)
	1–2	10:00 – Patong (Limpanyakul)
	1–3	35:10 – Yannakornthanapunt (Watthanaphaya)
	1–4	51:50 – Yannakornthanapunt (Watthanaphaya)
	1–5	57:46 – Sutivijitho (Khunraj, Yannakornthanapunt)
	1–6	58:53 – Yannakornthanapunt (Shim)

10 min
Penalties
4 min
32
Shots
53

12 December 2024; 16:00	Luxembourg	6–7 OT (2–4, 4–1, 0–1); OT: (0–1)	South Africa	Bangkok International Ice Hockey Arena, Bangkok; Attendance: 86

Game reference

Baptiste Franck
Goalies
Nico Janse van Rensburg
Referee:
(Kazakhstan) Timur Morev
Linesmen:
(France) Nicolas Constantineau
(Thailand) Wachara Luenam

	0–1	1:55 – Bate (Levi)
Toft – 5:18	1–1
	1–2	14:20 – Mlangeni (van der Westhuizen)
	1–3	16:27 – van der Merwe (Mlangeni)
	1–4	18:51 – Levi (Levin) (PP)
Reinert (D’Andrea) – 19:05	2–4
Springer (Nunes) – 22:22	3–4
	3–5	23:09 – van der Westhuizen
Springer (Vincens) – 26:17 (PP)	4–5
Mota (York) – 37:30	5–5
Cap (Fleischmann) – 38:35	6–5
	6–6	47:08 – Levin (Bate)
	6–7	61:14 – Baker (Bate)

10 min
Penalties
8 min
38
Shots
22

12 December 2024; 19:30	Thailand	5–2 (0–1, 4–0, 1–1)	Kyrgyzstan	Bangkok International Ice Hockey Arena, Bangkok; Attendance: 275

Game reference

Vijak Niyomvong
Goalies
Emir Bolsunbekov
Referee:
(Chinese Taipei) Shen Yen-Chin
Linesmen:
(New Zealand) Edward Howard
(Chinese Taipei) Chi-Lun Hung

	0–1	04:30 – Ali-Askarov (Supokhunov)
Thongin (Sutivijitho) – 27:12	1–1
Jaratkorn (SH) – 29:25	2–1
Patong (Jaratkorn, Limpanyakul) – 37:35	3–1
Prasertthanma (Kulthanthorn) – 37:58	4–1
Yannakornthanapunt (Kulthanthorn, Patong) (PP) – 52:40	5–1
	5–2	59:20 – Ali-Askarov (Kalchaev, Sapitov)

8 min
Penalties
8 min
34
Shots
38

14 December 2024; 16:00	Kyrgyzstan	5–2 (2–0, 2–0, 1–2)	Luxembourg	Bangkok International Ice Hockey Arena, Bangkok; Attendance: 135

Game reference

Emir Bolsunbekov
Artem Vasilev
Goalies
Baptiste Franck
Referee:
(Kazakhstan) Timur Morev
Linesmen:
(France) Nicolas Constantineau
(Thailand) Wachara Luenam

Leshchenko (Supokhunov) – 11:29	1–0
Bekmuratov (Esenov, Ali-Askarov) – 16:13	2–0
Bem (Barmanov) – 27:25	3–0
Leshchenko (Ali-Askarov) – 36:47	4–0
	4–1	50:19 – Lasis (Nunes, Vincens) (PP)
Shamshybekov (Nuraliev, Leshchenko) – 55:36	5–1
	5–2	58:00 – Lasis

14 min
Penalties
12 min
49
Shots
22

14 December 2024; 19:30	South Africa	2–8 (1–5, 0–1, 1–2)	Thailand	Bangkok International Ice Hockey Arena, Bangkok; Attendance: 665

Game reference

Connor Gilbert
Nico Janse van Rensburg
Goalies
James Na Phikul
Vijak Niyomvong
Referee:
(Chinese Taipei) Shen Yen-Chin
Linesmen:
(New Zealand) Edward Howard
(Thailand) Teerasak Rattanachot

	0–1	3:57 – Limpanyakul (Yannakornthanapunt, Jaratkorn) (PP1)
	0–2	7:11 – Sutivijitho (Khunraj)
	0–3	8:26 – Jaratkorn
	0–4	13:59 – Yannakornthanapunt (Watthanaphaya, Limpanyakul)
	0–5	17:22 – Limpanyakul (Jaratkorn)
Baker (van der Merwe) – 18:16	1–5
	1–6	39:48 – Patong
	1–7	40:37 – Watthanaphaya
Levin (Levi, Bate) – 44:12	2–7
	2–8	54:05 – Patong

6 min
Penalties
4 min
21
Shots
55

=== Top Players ===
Best Players Selected by the Directorate
Best Goalkeeper	(Thailand) Vijak Niyomvong
Best Defender	(Thailand) Natchayatorn Yannakornthanapunt
Best Forward	(Kyrgyzstan) Abdumalik Sapitov

Source: IIHF

Best Players of Each Team Selected by Coaches
Kyrgyzstan	Sher Shamshybekov
Luxembourg	Charlie Springer
South Africa	Noam Levin
Thailand	Vijak Niyomvong

Source: IIHF
