= 2022 IIHF World U18 Championship Division III =

2022 IIHF U18 World Championship Division III
Tournament details
- Host countries: Turkey; Bosnia and Herzegovina
- Dates: 11–17 April (Group A); 17–22 April (Group B)
- Teams: 9

The 2022 IIHF U18 World Championship Division III was two international under-18 ice hockey tournaments organised by the International Ice Hockey Federation. The Division III A and Division III B tournaments represent the sixth and the seventh tier of the IIHF World U18 Championship.

== Division III A ==
2022 IIHF U18 World Championship Division III A

Tournament details
- Host country: Turkey
- Venue(s): 1 (in 1 host city)
- Dates: 11–17 April
- Teams: 6

Tournament statistics
- Games played: 15
- Goals scored: 96 (6.4 per game)
- Attendance: 3,942 (263 per game)
- Scoring leader(s): (Chinese Taipei) Wen Pei-An (13 points)

The Division III A tournament was played in Istanbul, Turkey, from 11 to 17 April 2022.

=== Participants ===
Team	Qualification
Belgium	Placed 6th in Division II B last year and were relegated.
Israel	Placed 2nd in Division III A last year.
Iceland	Placed 3rd in Division III A last year.
Turkey	Hosts, placed 4th in Division III A last year.
Mexico	Placed 5th in Division III A last year.
Chinese Taipei	Placed 1st in Division III B last year and were promoted.

=== Match officials ===
Three referees and seven linesmen were selected for the tournament.

Referees	Linesmen
(Turkey) Murat Cücü; (Serbia) Ivan Nedeljković; (Netherlands) Ramon Sterkens	(Turkey) Yusuf Ceylan; (Spain) Alejandro García; (Turkey) Taha Kavlakoğlu; (Netherlands) Jeroen Klijberg; (Bulgaria) Stanislav Muhachev; (Turkey) Ahmet Özden; (Croatia) Marko Šaković

=== Standings ===
Pos	Team	Pld	W	OTW	OTL	L	GF	GA	GD	Pts	Promotion
1	Chinese Taipei	5	4	0	0	1	24	11	+13	12 (Note: Chinese Taipei 3 Pts, +1 GD; Belgium 3 Pts, 0 GD; Iceland 3 Pts, –1 GD)	Promoted to the 2023 Division II B
2	Belgium	5	4	0	0	1	23	8	+15	12	Promoted to the 2023 Division II B
3	Iceland	5	4	0	0	1	18	12	+6	12	
4	Israel	5	2	0	0	3	15	19	−4	6	
5	Mexico	5	0	1	0	4	8	22	−14	2	
6	Turkey (H)	5	0	0	1	4	8	24	−16	1	

Source: IIHF
Rules for classification: 1) points; 2) head-to-head points; 3) head-to-head goal difference; 4) head-to-head number of goals scored; 5) result against closest best-ranked team outside tied teams; 6) result against second-best ranked team outside tied teams; 7) seeding before tournament.
(H) Host

=== Results ===
All times are local (UTC+3).

11 April 2022; 13:00	Israel	4–3 (0–2, 4–0, 0–1)	Mexico	Zeytinburnu Ice Rink, Istanbul; Attendance: 50

Game reference

	0–1	09:23 – Méndez
	0–2	14:21 – Quinzaños (Valencia)
Sigalov (Kreimerman, Ben Tov) (PP) – 22:30	1–2
Abend (Segal, Sharon) – 23:19	2–2
Bondar – 31:56	3–2
Shulman (Ben Tov, Rigler) – 33:14	4–2
	4–3	48:52 – Contreras (Quinzanos)

10 min
Penalties
10 min
24
Shots
26

11 April 2022; 16:30	Iceland	3–1 (2–0, 1–0, 0–1)	Belgium	Zeytinburnu Ice Rink, Istanbul; Attendance: 101

Game reference
8 min	Penalties	8 min
49	Shots	27

11 April 2022; 20:30	Chinese Taipei	8–3 (3–1, 4–1, 1–1)	Turkey	Zeytinburnu Ice Rink, Istanbul; Attendance: 526

Game reference

Chen Tai-Yu
Goalies
Abdulsamet Karasungur
Furkan Duran
Referee:
(Serbia) Ivan Nedeljković
Linesmen:
(Netherlands) Jeroen Klijberg
(Croatia) Marko Šaković

Wen (Lin Yi-K.) (PP) – 04:29	1–0
	1–1	06:42 – Kanat (Güçlü)
Peng (Wen) – 09:50	2–1
Lin Yi-K. (Wen, Lin Yo.) – 14:49	3–1
Lin Yi-K. (Wen, Lin Yo.) (PP) – 22:42	4–1
	4–2	23:28 – Odabaş (Tokay, Karadağ)
Wen (Lin Yi-K.) – 29:28	5–2
Wen (Peng, Hsiao) – 32:43	6–2
Chen K. – 34:40	7–2
Chen Chiu. (Hsiao) – 34:40	8–2
	8–3	51:12 – Demir (Şenkaya) (PP)

37 min
Penalties
45 min
50
Shots
24

12 April 2022; 13:00	Israel	3–6 (0–2, 2–3, 1–1)	Iceland	Zeytinburnu Ice Rink, Istanbul; Attendance: 50

Game reference
6 min	Penalties	4 min
23	Shots	50

12 April 2022; 16:30	Mexico	0–4 (0–2, 0–1, 0–1)	Chinese Taipei	Zeytinburnu Ice Rink, Istanbul; Attendance: 82

Game reference

Emmanuel Santiago
Goalies
Chen Tai-Yu
Chen Chi-Chen
Referee:
(Netherlands) Ramon Sterkens
Linesmen:
(Turkey) Taha Kavlakoğlu
(Croatia) Marko Šaković

0–1	00:46 – Wen (Lin Yi-K., Lin Yo.)
0–2	19:18 – Wu (Lin J.)
0–3	39:26 – Wen (Chen Chiu., Wang Yu.)
0–4	49:53 – Lin Yo. (Peng, Wen) (PP)

10 min
Penalties
10 min
16
Shots
26

12 April 2022; 20:30	Belgium	5–0 (2–0, 2–0, 1–0)	Turkey	Zeytinburnu Ice Rink, Istanbul; Attendance: 461

Game reference
12 min	Penalties	8 min
42	Shots	19

14 April 2022; 13:00	Belgium	9–1 (1–1, 2–0, 6–0)	Mexico	Zeytinburnu Ice Rink, Istanbul; Attendance: 112

Game reference
10 min	Penalties	16 min
38	Shots	25

14 April 2022; 16:30	Israel	2–5 (1–1, 0–1, 1–3)	Chinese Taipei	Zeytinburnu Ice Rink, Istanbul; Attendance: 43

Game reference

David Verkhovskiy
Goalies
Chen Chi-Chen
Referee:
(Turkey) Murat Cücü
Linesmen:
(Turkey) Yusuf Ceylan
(Serbia) Marko Šaković

Sigalov (Ben Tov) – 03:55	1–0
	1–1	09:27 – Wen (Peng) (PP)
	1–2	33:25 – Peng (PP)
	1–3	45:23 – Chen Chiu.
	1–4	50:36 – Wen
Sigalov – 54:36	2–4
	2–5	59:01 – Lin Yo. (EN)

6 min
Penalties
4 min
23
Shots
20

14 April 2022; 20:30	Iceland	4–2 (2–0, 1–1, 1–1)	Turkey	Zeytinburnu Ice Rink, Istanbul; Attendance: 482

Game reference
14 min	Penalties	12 min
44	Shots	18

15 April 2022; 13:00	Chinese Taipei	2–4 (0–3, 2–0, 0–1)	Belgium	Zeytinburnu Ice Rink, Istanbul; Attendance: 52

Game reference

Chen Chi-Chen
Goalies
Stijin Raeymaekers
Referee:
(Turkey) Murat Cücü
Linesmen:
(Bulgaria) Stanislav Muhachev
(Turkey) Ahmet Özden

	0–1	05:32 – Van Montfort (van Reeth)
	0–2	11:54 – van Reeth (Gentry (PP)
	0–3	15:23 – van Reeth
Peng (Lin Yo.) (PP) – 31:05	1–3
Peng (Lin Yo.) (PP) – 32:50	2–3
	2–4	53:26 – Flavio Deverchin

12 min
Penalties
14 min
18
Shots
35

15 April 2022; 16:30	Mexico	1–3 (1–1, 0–1, 0–1)	Iceland	Zeytinburnu Ice Rink, Istanbul; Attendance: 77

Game reference
8 min	Penalties	8 min
18	Shots	33

15 April 2022; 20:30	Turkey	1–4 (0–0, 0–2, 1–2)	Israel	Zeytinburnu Ice Rink, Istanbul; Attendance: 725

Game reference
10 min	Penalties	35 min
21	Shots	36

17 April 2022; 13:00	Iceland	2–5 (0–1, 0–1, 2–3)	Chinese Taipei	Zeytinburnu Ice Rink, Istanbul; Attendance: 75

Game reference

Helgi Ívarsson
Goalies
Chen Tai-Yu
Referee:
(Netherlands) Ramon Sterkens
Linesmen:
(Turkey) Taha Kavlakoğlu
(Netherlands) Jeroen Klijberg

	0–1	08:11 – Peng
	0–2	25:57 – Lin Yi-K. (Wen)
	0–3	40:50 – Lo (Lin Yi-K.)
	0–4	41:30 – Lin Yo. (Wen)
	0–5	44:00 – Chen P. (Peng) (PP)
Blöndal (Hlynsson) (PP2) – 48:38	1–5
Blöndal (Jónsson) – 52:44	2–5

38 min
Penalties
18 min
39
Shots
28

17 April 2022; 16:30	Belgium	4–2 (0–0, 0–1, 4–1)	Israel	Silivrikapi Ice Rink, Istanbul; Attendance: 81

Game reference
			Referee: (Serbia) Ivan Nedeljković; Linesmen: (Turkey) Yusuf Ceylan (Turkey) Ahmet Özden
18 min	Penalties	29 min	Referee: (Serbia) Ivan Nedeljković; Linesmen: (Turkey) Yusuf Ceylan (Turkey) Ahmet Özden
16	Shots	31	Referee: (Serbia) Ivan Nedeljković; Linesmen: (Turkey) Yusuf Ceylan (Turkey) Ahmet Özden

17 April 2022; 20:30	Turkey	2–3 OT (0–0, 2–0, 0–2); OT: (0–1)	Mexico	Zeytinburnu Ice Rink, Istanbul; Attendance: 1,025

Game reference
			Referee: (Lithuania) Vladislovas Rudzinskas; Linesmen: (Spain) Alejandro García (Croatia) Marko Šaković
4 min	Penalties	8 min	Referee: (Lithuania) Vladislovas Rudzinskas; Linesmen: (Spain) Alejandro García (Croatia) Marko Šaković
19	Shots	27	Referee: (Lithuania) Vladislovas Rudzinskas; Linesmen: (Spain) Alejandro García (Croatia) Marko Šaković

== Division III B ==
2022 IIHF U18 World Championship Division III B

Tournament details
- Host country: Bosnia and Herzegovina
- Venue(s): 1 (in 1 host city)
- Dates: 17–22 April
- Teams: 3

Tournament statistics
- Games played: 6
- Goals scored: 78 (13 per game)
- Attendance: 2,625 (438 per game)
- Scoring leader(s): (Bosnia and Herzegovina) Nikko Gaković (20 points)

The Division III B tournament was played in Sarajevo, Bosnia and Herzegovina, from 17 to 22 April 2022.

=== Participants ===
Team	Qualification
~~New Zealand~~	Placed 6th in Division III A last year and were relegated.
~~Hong Kong~~	Placed 2nd in Division III B last year.
South Africa	Placed 3rd in Division III B last year.
Luxembourg	Placed 4th in Division III B last year.
Bosnia and Herzegovina	Hosts, first time participating since 2005.

=== Match officials ===
Two referees and three linesmen were selected for the tournament.

Referees	Linesmen
(Czech Republic) Luděk Pilný; (Italy) Omar Piniè	(Slovakia) Peter Jedlička; (Czech Republic) Lukáš Rampír; (Belgium) Chris van Grinsven

=== Standings ===
Pos	Team	Pld	W	OTW	OTL	L	GF	GA	GD	Pts	Promotion
1	Bosnia and Herzegovina (H)	4	4	0	0	0	37	15	+22	12	Promoted to the 2023 Division III A
2	Luxembourg	4	1	0	0	3	20	36	−16	3	Promoted to the 2023 Division III A
3	South Africa	4	1	0	0	3	21	27	−6	3	
–	New Zealand (Note: New Zealand withdrew their team because of the COVID-19 pandemic.)	0	0	0	0	0	0	0	0	0	Withdrawn
–	Hong Kong (Note: Hong Kong withdrew their team because of the COVID-19 pandemic.)	0	0	0	0	0	0	0	0	0	Withdrawn

Source: IIHF
Rules for classification: 1) points; 2) head-to-head points; 3) head-to-head goal difference; 4) head-to-head number of goals scored; 5) result against closest best-ranked team outside tied teams; 6) result against second-best ranked team outside tied teams; 7) seeding before tournament.
(H) Host

=== Results ===
All times are local (UTC+2).

17 April 2022; 18:00	South Africa	4–8 (1–2, 1–4, 2–2)	Bosnia and Herzegovina	Zetra Olympic Hall, Sarajevo; Attendance: 855

Game reference

Ivan Muller
Goalies
Karim Ahmetovski
Referee:
(Czech Republic) Luděk Pilný
Linesmen:
(Slovakia) Peter Jedlička
(Belgium) Chris van Grinsven

	0–1	05:52 – Gaković (Mrkva) (PP)
Beek (Levi) – 08:23	1–1
	1–2	15:28 – Pleho (Mrkva)
	1–3	20:08 – Gaković (Mrkva)
	1–4	26:50 – Drnda (Vranešić)
	1–5	27:26 – Vulović (Pleho)
Levi (Beek, Mlangeni) – 31:21	2–5
	2–6	39:07 – Mrkva (Pleho)
	2–7	43:23 – Mrkva
Levi – 44:22	3–7
	3–8	50:38 – Mrkva (Gaković)
Levi (Sauer) – 55:57	4–8

4 min
Penalties
8 min
33
Shots
38

18 April 2022; 18:00	Bosnia and Herzegovina	11–4 (5–1, 3–2, 3–1)	Luxembourg	Zetra Olympic Hall, Sarajevo; Attendance: 565

Game reference

Karim Ahmetovski
Goalies
Finn Molitor
Referee:
(Czech Republic) Luděk Pilný
Linesmen:
(Slovakia) Peter Jedlička
(Czech Republic) Lukáš Rampír

Memić (Gaković) (PP) – 05:14	1–0
Gaković (Drnda) (PP) – 06:13	2–0
	2–1	08:03 – Nunes (Braun) (PP)
Pleho (Vranešić) (SH) – 12:23	3–1
Mrkva (Smajlović) – 15:30	4–1
Gaković (Mrkva, Drnda) (PP) – 18:14	5–1
Drnda (Memić, Mušović) – 21:23	6–1
	6–2	26:46 – Springer (Braun)
	6–3	33:09 – Potucek (Konsbruck, Vincens)
Gaković (Dizdarević) – 33:23	7–3
Drnda (Vulović, Mušović) – 34:57	8–3
Mrkva (Memić) (PP) – 40:25	9–3
Pleho (Gaković) – 43:12	10–3
	10–4	51:18 – Springer (Konsbruck, Schonckert)
Mrkva (Gaković, Vulović) (PP) – 55:41	11–4

12 min
Penalties
16 min
39
Shots
26

19 April 2022; 18:00	South Africa	7–4 (3–3, 3–0, 1–1)	Luxembourg	Zetra Olympic Hall, Sarajevo; Attendance: 125

Game reference

Ruan van der Merwe
Goalies
Aubéri Lorang
Referee:
(Italy) Omar Piniè
Linesmen:
(Czech Republic) Lukáš Rampír
(Belgium) Chris van Grinsven

Levi (Geyer) – 07:14	1–0
Ras (T. van der Merwe) – 09:06	2–0
	2–1	10:18 – Ferretti (Mykkanen) (PP)
	2–2	13:52 – Mykkanen (Braun) (PP)
	2–3	18:21 – Ferretti (Vincens) (SH)
Levi (Beek, Baker) (PP) – 19:01	3–3
Beek – 20:58	4–3
Booi (Baker) – 24:43	5–3
Mlangeni (Taylor) (PP) – 39:25	6–3
	6–4	56:31 – Weyders (Nunes, Springer) (PP)
Levi (ENG) – 58:59	7–4

14 min
Penalties
12 min
32
Shots
35

20 April 2022; 18:00	Bosnia and Herzegovina	6–4 (5–0, 1–2, 0–2)	South Africa	Zetra Olympic Hall, Sarajevo; Attendance: 600

Game reference
14 min	Penalties	10 min
49	Shots	23

21 April 2022; 18:00	Luxembourg	3–12 (1–2, 0–5, 2–5)	Bosnia and Herzegovina	Zetra Olympic Hall, Sarajevo; Attendance: 325

Game reference
12 min	Penalties	4 min
27	Shots	37

22 April 2022; 18:00	Luxembourg	9–6 (2–3, 3–2, 4–1)	South Africa	Zetra Olympic Hall, Sarajevo; Attendance: 155

Game reference
			Referee: (Czech Republic) Luděk Pilný; Linesmen: (Slovakia) Peter Jedlička (Czech Republic) Lukáš Rampír
8 min	Penalties	4 min	Referee: (Czech Republic) Luděk Pilný; Linesmen: (Slovakia) Peter Jedlička (Czech Republic) Lukáš Rampír
47	Shots	19	Referee: (Czech Republic) Luděk Pilný; Linesmen: (Slovakia) Peter Jedlička (Czech Republic) Lukáš Rampír
