= 2023 World Junior Ice Hockey Championships – Division III =

International ice hockey tournament

2023 IIHF U20 World Championship Division III

Tournament details
- Host country: Turkey
- City: Istanbul
- Venue: 1 (in 1 host city)
- Dates: 26 January – 2 February 2023
- Teams: 8

Tournament statistics
- Games played: 22
- Goals scored: 207 (9.41 per game)
- Attendance: 5,182 (236 per game)
- Scoring leader: (Australia) Dmitri Kuleshov (29 points)

Official website
- www.iihf.com

The 2023 World Junior Ice Hockey Championship Division III was an international ice hockey tournament organized by the International Ice Hockey Federation. Division III represents the sixth and the lowest tier of the IIHF World Junior Championship. The tournament was played in Istanbul, Turkey, from 26 January to 2 February 2023. It consisted of one pool of eight teams separated into two preliminary round groups. The winners of this tournament, Australia, were promoted to the 2024 World Junior Ice Hockey Championship Division II B.

To be eligible as a junior player in this tournament, a player cannot be born earlier than 2003.

== Participating teams ==
Team	Qualification
Australia	Placed 3rd in Division III last year.
Israel	Placed 4th in Division III last year.
Turkey	Hosts; placed 5th in Division III last year.
Bosnia and Herzegovina	Placed 6th in Division III last year.
Kyrgyzstan	Placed 7th in Division III last year.
South Africa	Placed 8th in Division III last year.
Bulgaria	Returned to World Championship for first time since 2020.
New Zealand	Returned to World Championship for first time since 2020.

== Match officials ==
Five referees and ten linesmen were selected for the tournament.

Referees

- (Australia) Nicholas Air
- (Turkey) Murat Aygun
- (Slovenia) Bostjan Groznik
- (Chinese Taipei) Yen-Chin Shen
- (Netherlands) Chris van Grinsven

Linesmen

- (Turkey) Berkay Aslanbey
- (Turkey) Ferhat Dogus Aygun
- (Belgium) Thibo Christiaens
- (China) Yunjie Cui
- (Australia) John Dow
- (Turkey) Taha Kavlakoglu
- (Romania) Aron Magyar
- (Mexico) Sem Ramirez
- (Latvia) Kaspars Sirins
- (Hong Kong) Chun Hang Wong

== First round ==
=== Group A ===
Pos	Team	Pld	W	OTW	OTL	L	GF	GA	GD	Pts	Qualification
1	Australia	3	3	0	0	0	28	6	+22	9	Advance to Quarterfinals
2	Kyrgyzstan	3	2	0	0	1	11	16	−5	6	Advance to Quarterfinals
3	New Zealand	3	1	0	0	2	9	10	−1	3	Advance to Quarterfinals
4	Bosnia and Herzegovina	3	0	0	0	3	4	20	−16	0	Advance to Quarterfinals

Source: IIHF

26 January 2023; 10:00	Australia	12–4 (3–1, 3–1, 6–2)	Kyrgyzstan	Zeytinburnu Ice Rink, Istanbul

Game reference

26 January 2023; 17:00	Bosnia and Herzegovina	1–6 (0–2, 0–3, 1–1)	New Zealand	Zeytinburnu Ice Rink, Istanbul

Game reference

27 January 2023; 10:00	Bosnia and Herzegovina	3–4 (1–1, 1–2, 1–1)	Kyrgyzstan	Zeytinburnu Ice Rink, Istanbul

Game reference

27 January 2023; 17:00	New Zealand	2–6 (0–3, 1–3, 1–0)	Australia	Zeytinburnu Ice Rink, Istanbul

Game reference

29 January 2023; 10:00	Australia	10–0 (1–0, 6–0, 3–0)	Bosnia and Herzegovina	Zeytinburnu Ice Rink, Istanbul

Game reference

29 January 2023; 17:00	Kyrgyzstan	3–1 (1–1, 1–0, 1–0)	New Zealand	Zeytinburnu Ice Rink, Istanbul

Game reference

=== Group B ===
Pos	Team	Pld	W	OTW	OTL	L	GF	GA	GD	Pts	Qualification
1	Israel	3	3	0	0	0	30	4	+26	9	Advance to Quarterfinals
2	Bulgaria	3	2	0	0	1	10	11	−1	6	Advance to Quarterfinals
3	Turkey (H)	3	1	0	0	2	15	14	+1	3	Advance to Quarterfinals
4	South Africa	3	0	0	0	3	4	30	−26	0	Advance to Quarterfinals

Source: IIHF
(H) Host

26 January 2023; 13:30	Israel	16–1 (4–0, 8–1, 4–0)	South Africa	Zeytinburnu Ice Rink, Istanbul

Game reference

26 January 2023; 20:30	Turkey	3–5 (1–0, 1–2, 1–3)	Bulgaria	Zeytinburnu Ice Rink, Istanbul

Game reference

27 January 2023; 13:30	Bulgaria	0–8 (0–5, 0–1, 0–2)	Israel	Zeytinburnu Ice Rink, Istanbul

Game reference

27 January 2023; 20:30	Turkey	9–3 (4–2, 1–0, 4–1)	South Africa	Zeytinburnu Ice Rink, Istanbul

Game reference

29 January 2023; 13:30	South Africa	0–5 (0–1, 0–3, 0–1)	Bulgaria	Zeytinburnu Ice Rink, Istanbul

Game reference

29 January 2023; 20:30	Israel	6–3 (5–0, 1–2, 0–1)	Turkey	Zeytinburnu Ice Rink, Istanbul

Game reference

== Playoffs ==
All teams enter the Quarterfinals; Semifinals are to be re-seeded.

Quarterfinals
30 January
A1 Australia	28
B4 South Africa	0
30 January
B1 Israel	10
A4 Bosnia and Herzegovina	0
30 January
A2 Kyrgyzstan	1
B3 Turkey	3
30 January
B2 Bulgaria	6
A3 New Zealand	2

Semifinals
1 February
1 Israel	6
5 Turkey	4
1 February
2 Australia	4
3 Bulgaria	1

Final
2 February
1 Israel	1
2 Australia	4
3rd place match
2 February
3 Bulgaria	8
5 Turkey	3

7th place match
1 February
7	Bosnia and Herzegovina	7
8	South Africa	3

5th place match
2 February
4	Kyrgyzstan	2
6	New Zealand	3

=== Quarterfinals ===
January 30, 2023; 10:00	Australia	28–0 (5–0, 11–0, 12–0)	South Africa	Zeytinburnu Ice Rink, Istanbul

Game reference

January 30, 2023; 13:30	Bulgaria	6–2 (3–1, 1–0, 2–1)	New Zealand	Zeytinburnu Ice Rink, Istanbul

Game reference

January 30, 2023; 17:00	Israel	10–0 (4–0, 3–0, 3–0)	Bosnia and Herzegovina	Zeytinburnu Ice Rink, Istanbul

Game reference

January 30, 2023; 20:30	Kyrgyzstan	1–3 (1–2, 0–0, 0–1)	Turkey	Zeytinburnu Ice Rink, Istanbul

Game reference

=== Semifinals ===
1 February 2023; 17:00	Australia	4–1 (1–0, 1–0, 2–1)	Bulgaria	Zeytinburnu Ice Rink, Istanbul

Game reference

1 February 2023; 20:30	Israel	6–4 (1–1, 3–1, 2–2)	Turkey	Zeytinburnu Ice Rink, Istanbul

Game reference

=== 7th place match ===
1 February 2023; 13:30	Bosnia and Herzegovina	7–3 (6–0, 1–1, 0–2)	South Africa	Zeytinburnu Ice Rink, Istanbul

Game reference

=== 5th place match ===
2 February 2023; 13:30	Kyrgyzstan	2–3 (1–0, 0–0, 1–3)	New Zealand	Zeytinburnu Ice Rink, Istanbul

Game reference

=== 3rd place match ===
2 February 2023; 17:00	Bulgaria	8–3 (3–1, 3–2, 2–0)	Turkey	Zeytinburnu Ice Rink, Istanbul

Game reference

=== Final ===
2 February 2023; 20:30	Israel	1–4 (0–0, 0–2, 1–2)	Australia	Zeytinburnu Ice Rink, Istanbul

Game reference

== Final standings ==
Position	Team	Promotion / Relegation
1	Australia	Promoted to the 2024 Division II B
2	Israel	
3	Bulgaria	
4	Turkey	
5	New Zealand	
6	Kyrgyzstan	
7	Bosnia and Herzegovina	Relegated to the 2024 Division III B
8	South Africa	Relegated to the 2024 Division III B
