= Luke Green (ice hockey) =

Canadian ice hockey player (born 1998)

- Born: January 12, 1998 (age 28) Halifax, Nova Scotia, Canada
- Height: 6 ft 0 in (183 cm)
- Weight: 187 lb (85 kg; 13 st 5 lb)
- Position: Defense
- Shoots: Right
- ICEHL team Former teams: Ferencvárosi TC; Manitoba Moose; Vaasan Sport; Västerviks IK; HK Nitra; Düsseldorfer EG
- NHL draft: 79th overall, 2016; Winnipeg Jets
- Playing career: 2016–present

Luke Green (born January 12, 1998) is a Canadian professional ice hockey player who currently plays for Ferencvárosi TC of the ICE Hockey League (ICEHL). He was drafted in the third round, 79nd overall, by the Winnipeg Jets in the 2016 NHL entry draft. He was the first overall pick in the 2014 QMJHL Entry Draft.

== Playing career ==
=== Junior ===
Green was selected first overall in the 2014 QMJHL Entry Draft by the Saint John Sea Dogs. He finished his rookie season with 36 points, which ranked him second among rookie defensemen. On December 26, 2016, he was traded to the Sherbrooke Phoenix in exchange for Sherbrooke’s 2018 first-round selection along with second-round picks in 2018 and 2020.

=== Professional ===
At the 2016 NHL entry draft, Green was selected in the third round (79th overall) by the Winnipeg Jets. In March 2017, the Manitoba Moose (Winnipeg's AHL affiliate) signed Green to an amateur tryout agreement, allowing him to play for the team. In September 2017, he signed a three-year entry level contract with the Jets. After playing with the Moose for the next few years, in February 2021, the Jets assigned him to Finnish Elite League club Vaasan Sport for the remainder of the season. However, 11 days later. he terminated his contract with the Finnish club due to personal reasons, after having made two appearances.

In October 2021, Green signed with Swedish Allsvenskan club Västerviks IK.

In December 2022, he signed with HK Nitra in the Slovak Extraliga.

In October 2023, he signed with German club Düsseldorfer EG in the Deutsche Eishockey Liga.

In November 2024, it was announced that he would sign with Slovak Extraliga club ŠK Slovan Bratislava, however, he ultimately did not travel to join the club. Instead, he returned to HK Nitra the following month.
