= 2022 World Junior Ice Hockey Championships – Division III =

2022 IIHF U20 World Championship Division III

Tournament details
- Host country: Mexico
- Venue: 1 (in 1 host city)
- Dates: 22–30 July 2022
- Teams: 8

Tournament statistics
- Games played: 22
- Goals scored: 180 (8.18 per game)
- Attendance: 5,141 (234 per game)
- Scoring leader: (Israel) Mike Levin (16 points)

Official website
- www.iihf.com

The 2022 World Junior Ice Hockey Championship Division III was an international ice hockey tournament organized by the International Ice Hockey Federation. Division III represents the sixth and the lowest tier of the IIHF World Junior Championship. The tournament would have been held in Querétaro, Mexico, from 6 to 16 January 2022, but was cancelled due to the COVID-19 pandemic. Later it was rescheduled and was played from 22 to 30 July 2022.

Bulgaria withdrew from the July tournament and was replaced by Australia, which originally opted out of the January tournament.

To be eligible as a junior player in this tournament, a player cannot be born earlier than 2002.

== Participating teams ==
| Team | Qualification |
|---|---|
| Israel | placed 6th in 2020 Division II B and were relegated |
| Australia | placed 2nd in 2020 Division III |
| Turkey | placed 3rd in 2020 Division III |
| Mexico | hosts; placed 4th in 2020 Division III |
| Chinese Taipei | placed 7th in 2020 Division III |
| South Africa | placed 8th in 2020 Division III |
| Kyrgyzstan | first participation in World Championship |
| Bosnia and Herzegovina | first participation in World Championship |

== First round ==
=== Group A ===
| Pos | Team | Pld | W | OTW | OTL | L | GF | GA | GD | Pts | Qualification |
|---|---|---|---|---|---|---|---|---|---|---|---|
| 1 | Chinese Taipei | 3 | 1 | 1 | 0 | 1 | 13 | 12 | +1 | 5 (Note: Chinese Taipei 5 Pts, Israel 2 Pts, Mexico 2 Pts, Israel 3–2 Mexico) | Advance to Quarterfinals |
| 2 | Israel | 3 | 1 | 1 | 0 | 1 | 15 | 9 | +6 | 5 | Advance to Quarterfinals |
| 3 | Mexico (H) | 3 | 1 | 0 | 2 | 0 | 11 | 10 | +1 | 5 | Advance to Quarterfinals |
| 4 | Kyrgyzstan | 3 | 1 | 0 | 0 | 2 | 5 | 13 | −8 | 3 | Advance to Quarterfinals |

Source: IIHF
(H) Host
Notes:

| 22 July 2022; 17:00 | Kyrgyzstan | 1–8 (0–5, 1–1, 0–2) | Israel | Lakeside Ice Park, Querétaro |

Game reference

| 22 July 2022; 20:45 | Mexico | 5–6 GWS (1–1, 1–1, 3–3) (0–0, 0–1) | Chinese Taipei | Lakeside Ice Park, Querétaro |

Game reference

| 23 July 2022; 17:00 | Israel | 4–6 (1–1, 0–1, 3–4) | Chinese Taipei | Lakeside Ice Park, Querétaro |

Game reference

| 23 July 2022; 20:30 | Mexico | 4–1 (1–0, 3–0, 0–1) | Kyrgyzstan | Lakeside Ice Park, Querétaro |

Game reference

| 25 July 2022; 17:00 | Chinese Taipei | 1–3 (1–2, 0–0, 0–1) | Kyrgyzstan | Lakeside Ice Park, Querétaro |

Game reference

| 25 July 2022; 20:30 | Israel | 3–2 OT (0–0, 1–0, 1–2) (1–0) | Mexico | Lakeside Ice Park, Querétaro |

Game reference

=== Group B ===
| Pos | Team | Pld | W | OTW | OTL | L | GF | GA | GD | Pts | Qualification |
|---|---|---|---|---|---|---|---|---|---|---|---|
| 1 | Australia | 3 | 3 | 0 | 0 | 0 | 33 | 3 | +30 | 9 | Advance to Quarterfinals |
| 2 | Turkey | 3 | 2 | 0 | 0 | 1 | 15 | 14 | +1 | 6 | Advance to Quarterfinals |
| 3 | Bosnia and Herzegovina | 3 | 0 | 1 | 0 | 2 | 10 | 22 | −12 | 2 | Advance to Quarterfinals |
| 4 | South Africa | 3 | 0 | 0 | 1 | 2 | 7 | 26 | −19 | 1 | Advance to Quarterfinals |

Source: IIHF

| 22 July 2022; 10:00 | Bosnia and Herzegovina | 1–12 (0–3, 1–7, 0–2) | Australia | Lakeside Ice Park, Querétaro |

Game reference

| 22 July 2022; 13:30 | Turkey | 8–2 (4–1, 2–0, 2–1) | South Africa | Lakeside Ice Park, Querétaro |

Game reference

| 23 July 2022; 10:00 | Turkey | 6–4 (2–1, 2–1, 2–2) | Bosnia and Herzegovina | Lakeside Ice Park, Querétaro |

Game reference

| 23 July 2022; 13:30 | Australia | 13–1 (4–0, 4–1, 5–0) | South Africa | Lakeside Ice Park, Querétaro |

Game reference

| 25 July 2022; 10:00 | South Africa | 4–5 OT (2–1, 1–1, 1–2) (0–1) | Bosnia and Herzegovina | Lakeside Ice Park, Querétaro |

Game reference

| 25 July 2022; 13:30 | Australia | 8–1 (3–0, 1–1, 4–0) | Turkey | Lakeside Ice Park, Querétaro |

Game reference

== Playoffs ==
All teams enter the Quarterfinals; Semifinals are to be re-seeded.

Quarterfinals
27 July
A1 Chinese Taipei | 7
B4 South Africa | 2
27 July
B1 Australia | 5
A4 Kyrgyzstan | 1
27 July
A2 Israel | 7
B3 Bosnia and Herzegovina | 3
27 July
B2 Turkey | 2
A3 Mexico | 5

Semifinals
29 July
2 Chinese Taipei (OT) | 6
4 Israel | 5
29 July
1 Australia | 2
5 Mexico | 3

Final
30 July
2 Chinese Taipei (OT) | 5
5 Mexico | 4
3rd place match
30 July
1 Australia | 1
4 Israel | 0

7th place match
29 July
7 | Kyrgyzstan (OT) | 4
8 | South Africa | 3

5th place match
30 July
3 | Turkey | 5
6 | Bosnia and Herzegovina | 1

=== Quarterfinals ===
| 27 July 2022; 10:00 | Australia | 5–1 (3–1, 1–0, 1–0) | Kyrgyzstan | Lakeside Ice Park, Querétaro |

Game reference

| 27 July 2022; 13:30 | Turkey | 2–5 (0–1, 0–1, 2–3) | Mexico | Lakeside Ice Park, Querétaro |

Game reference

| 27 July 2022; 17:00 | Chinese Taipei | 7–2 (2–0, 3–0, 2–2) | South Africa | Lakeside Ice Park, Querétaro |

Game reference

| 27 July 2022; 20:30 | Israel | 7–3 (2–1, 2–0, 3–2) | Bosnia and Herzegovina | Lakeside Ice Park, Querétaro |

Game reference

=== Semifinals ===
| 29 July 2022; 14:00 | Australia | 2–3 (0–1, 0–1, 2–1) | Mexico | Lakeside Ice Park, Querétaro |

Game reference

| 29 July 2022; 18:30 | Chinese Taipei | 6–5 OT (1–1, 1–3, 3–1) (1–0) | Israel | Lakeside Ice Park, Querétaro |

Game reference

=== 7th place match ===
| 29 July 2022; 10:00 | Kyrgyzstan | 4–3 OT (2–0, 1–1, 0–2) (1–0) | South Africa | Lakeside Ice Park, Querétaro |

Game reference

=== 5th place match ===
| 30 July 2022; 11:00 | Turkey | 5–1 (3–0, 1–1, 1–0) | Bosnia and Herzegovina | Lakeside Ice Park, Querétaro |

Game reference

=== 3rd place match ===
| 30 July 2022; 15:00 | Australia | 1–0 (0–0, 1–0, 0–0) | Israel | Lakeside Ice Park, Querétaro |

Game reference

=== Final ===
| 30 July 2022; 19:00 | Chinese Taipei | 5–4 OT (1–2, 3–1, 0–1) (1–0) | Mexico | Lakeside Ice Park, Querétaro |

Game reference

== Final standings ==
| Position | Team | Promotion |
|---|---|---|
| 1 | Chinese Taipei | Promoted to the 2023 Division II B |
| 2 | Mexico | Promoted to the 2023 Division II B |
| 3 | Australia | |
| 4 | Israel | |
| 5 | Turkey | |
| 6 | Bosnia and Herzegovina | |
| 7 | Kyrgyzstan | |
| 8 | South Africa | |
