= Chinese Taipei men's national junior ice hockey team =

Chinese Taipei
- Association: Chinese Taipei Ice Hockey Federation
- General manager: (Taiwan) Chang Yu-sheng
- Head coach: (Taiwan) Weng To
- Assistants: (Taiwan) Chang Pan-Yao
- Captain: Peng Mo
- Most games: Several players (10)
- Top scorer: Chen Chiung-Yuan (7); Chi Kai-Yuan (7); Liu Kuan-Ting (7)
- Most points: Peng Mo (19)
- IIHF code: TPE

First international
- Iceland 11 – 1 Chinese Taipei (Istanbul, Turkey; 4 January 2010)

Biggest win
- Chinese Taipei 18 – 1 Bosnia and Herzegovina (Istanbul, Turkey; 31 January 2025)

Biggest defeat
- Japan 26 – 0 Chinese Taipei (Seoul, South Korea; 28 May 2012); Chinese Taipei 2 – 28 Latvia (Gangneung, South Korea; 22 January 2024)

IIHF World U20 Championship
- Appearances: 11 (first in 2010)
- Best result: 33rd (2023)

International record (W–L–T)
- 15–29–2

The Chinese Taipei men's national under 20 ice hockey team is the national under-20 ice hockey team in the Republic of China (Taiwan). The team represents " Chinese Taipei " at the International Ice Hockey Federation 's World Junior Hockey Championship Division III A .

== International competitions ==
=== World Junior Championships ===
- 2010 – 39th overall (5th in Division III)
- 2011 – 41st overall (7th in Division III)
- 2012–2016 – Did not participate
- 2017 – 41st overall (7th in Division III)
- 2018 – 42nd overall (8th in Division III)
- 2019 – 40th overall (6th in Division III)
- 2020 – 41st overall (7th in Division III)
- 2021 – Cancelled due to COVID-19 pandemic
- 2022 – 35th overall (1st in Division III)
- 2023 – 33rd overall (5th in Division II B)
- 2024 – 34th overall (6th in Division II B)
- 2025 – 36th overall (2nd in Division III A)
- 2026 – 35th overall (1st in Division III A)
