= 2026 World Junior Ice Hockey Championships – Division III =

International youth ice hockey tournament

2026 IIHF U20 World Championship Division III
Tournament details
- Host countries: Bulgaria; Kyrgyzstan
- Venues: 2 (in 2 host cities)
- Dates: 19–25 January 2026; 18–24 January 2026
- Teams: 12

The 2026 World Junior Ice Hockey Championship Division III were two international under-20 ice hockey tournaments organized by the International Ice Hockey Federation. Division III A represents the sixth tier and Division III B the seventh tier of the IIHF World Junior Championship. For each tier, the first-placed team was promoted to the next higher tier. The last-placed team from Division III A was relegated to Division III B.

To be eligible as a junior player in these tournaments, a player couldn't be born earlier than 2006.

== Division III A ==
2026 IIHF U20 World Championship Division III A

Tournament details
- Host country: Bulgaria
- City: Sofia
- Venue: 1 (in 1 host city)
- Dates: 19–25 January 2026
- Teams: 6

Tournament statistics
- Games played: 15
- Goals scored: 149 (9.93 per game)
- Attendance: 2,358 (157 per game)
- Scoring leader: (Turkey) Emin İnandı (16 points)

Official website
- www.iihf.com

The Division III A tournament was played in Sofia, Bulgaria, from 19 to 25 January 2026.

=== Participating teams ===
| Team | Qualification |
|---|---|
| Belgium | placed 6th in Division II B last year and were relegated |
| Chinese Taipei | placed 2nd in Division III A last year |
| Bulgaria (hosts) | placed 3rd in Division III A last year |
| Turkey | placed 4th in Division III A last year |
| Bosnia and Herzegovina | placed 5th in Division III A last year |
| Thailand | placed 1st in Division III B last year and were promoted |

=== Standings ===
| Pos | Team | Pld | W | OTW | OTL | L | GF | GA | GD | Pts | Promotion or relegation |
|---|---|---|---|---|---|---|---|---|---|---|---|
| 1 | Chinese Taipei | 5 | 4 | 1 | 0 | 0 | 42 | 14 | +28 | 14 | Promotion to the 2027 Division II B |
| 2 | Bulgaria (H) | 5 | 3 | 1 | 0 | 1 | 29 | 13 | +16 | 11 | |
| 3 | Belgium | 5 | 2 | 0 | 3 | 0 | 27 | 16 | +11 | 9 | |
| 4 | Turkey | 5 | 2 | 1 | 0 | 2 | 34 | 15 | +19 | 8 | |
| 5 | Thailand | 5 | 1 | 0 | 0 | 4 | 11 | 35 | −24 | 3 | |
| 6 | Bosnia and Herzegovina | 5 | 0 | 0 | 0 | 5 | 6 | 56 | −50 | 0 | Relegation to the 2027 Division III B |

Source: IIHF
Rules for classification: 1) points; 2) head-to-head points; 3) head-to-head goal difference; 4) head-to-head number of goals scored; 5) result against closest best-ranked team outside tied teams; 6) result against next best-ranked team outside tied teams; 7) seeding before tournament.
(H) Host

=== Results ===
All times are local, EET (UTC+2).

| 19 January 2026; 13:00 | Thailand | 1–10 (0–2, 0–5, 1–3) | Turkey | Winter Sports Palace, Sofia; Attendance: 15 |

Game reference

Teeranon Ardharn
Goalies
Kayra Aydos
Mustafa Findikoglu
Referee:
(Iceland) Sindri Gunnarsson
Linesmen:
(Bulgaria) Konstantin Dikov
(Norway) Niklas Wilhelmsen

| | 0–1 | 11:03 – Yavuz (Yayilkan, Girgin) |
| | 0–2 | 13:21 – Altay (SH) |
| | 0–3 | 23:29 – Serik (Altay) |
| | 0–4 | 25:39 – Yavuz (Girgin, Serik) |
| | 0–5 | 30:56 – Yayilkan (Yavuz) |
| | 0–6 | 37:31 – Karadag (Inandi, Odabas) |
| | 0–7 | 38:35 – Girgin (Bayazit, Yayilkan) |
| | 0–8 | 48:05 – Girgin (Yavuz) (SH) |
| | 0–9 | 54:55 – Altay (Inandi) |
| Teet. Pataramasakul (Thongin) (SH) – 56:56 | 1–9 |
| | 1–10 | 59:13 – Inandi (Karadag) |

4 min
Penalties
12 min
17
Shots
39

| 19 January 2026; 16:30 | Chinese Taipei | 15–0 (3–0, 7–0, 5–0) | Bosnia and Herzegovina | Winter Sports Palace, Sofia; Attendance: 10 |

Game reference

Hao-Hsuan Kao
Lilong Chen
Goalies
Arman Bajramovic
Ajnur Husejnovic
Referee:
(Netherlands) Ramon Sterkens
Linesmen:
(Netherlands) Lodewijk Beelen
(Israel) Ariel Levites

| Lai (L. Peng) (SH) – 01:28 | 1–0 |
| K. C. Wang (Y. Chen) – 08:51 | 2–0 |
| Chen (Liu, (K. C. Wang) (PP) – 10:33 | 3–0 |
| Liu (K. C. Wang, K. Y. Wang) – 23:39 | 4–0 |
| Hsiao (Tsui, Tsai) – 25:09 | 5–0 |
| Tsui (Tsai) – 25:23 | 6–0 |
| T. Chen (Hung) – 26:06 | 7–0 |
| Lai (K. Y. Wang, Lee) – 30:50 | 8–0 |
| Chi (Tsui) (PP) – 33:05 | 9–0 |
| K. C. Wang – 35:33 | 10–0 |
| Tsai (Hsaio) (PP) – 45:47 | 11–0 |
| Liu (Liao, Y. Chen) – 46:21 | 12–0 |
| Chi (Tsai) (PP) – 52:16 | 13–0 |
| Lai (Y. Chen) – 53:46 | 14–0 |
| K. Peng (K. C. Wang, L. Peng) – 54:21 | 15–0 |

12 min
Penalties
60 min
35
Shots
6

| 19 January 2026; 20:00 | Bulgaria | 4–3 OT (0–0, 1–2, 2–1) (OT: 1–0) | Belgium | Winter Sports Palace, Sofia; Attendance: 396 |

Game reference

Georgi Milanov
Goalies
Thijs Scheyltjens
Referee:
(Spain) Alexey Roshchyn
Linesmen:
(Turkey) Alkan Kilinc
(Latvia) Vladislavs Odins

| Dikov (McMullin) – 21:47 | 1–0 |
| | 1–1 | 36:51 – Bober (Gregory, Laeremans) |
| | 1–2 | 37:33 – Geenen (Hendrix, Schoovaertz) |
| | 1–3 | 41:34 – Gregory (Cuvelier, Monsieurs) |
| Kozhuharov (Dikov) (PP) – 53:15 | 2–3 |
| Stanimirov (Todorov) (EA) – 59:31 | 3–3 |
| Stanimirov (Stamenov, Todorov) (PP) – 64:07 | 4–3 |

6 min
Penalties
14 min
22
Shots
25

| 20 January 2026; 13:00 | Bosnia and Herzegovina | 4–6 (0–2, 3–1, 1–3) | Thailand | Winter Sports Palace, Sofia; Attendance: 18 |

Game reference

Arman Bajramovic
Goalies
Teeranon Ardharn
Referee:
(Mexico) Oscar Perez
Linesmen:
(Bulgaria) Konstantin Dikov
(Latvia) Vladislavs Odins

| | 0–1 | 09:01 – W. Watthanaphaya (Benhar, Ardharn) |
| | 0–2 | 18:30 – Teep. Pararamasakul (Jorjaroenruk, Thongin) |
| Silajszic (Drnda, Vucinic) (PP) – 20:44 | 1–2 |
| | 1–3 | 24:33 – Prasertthanma |
| K. Koronja (S. Koronja) – 26:44 | 2–3 |
| Silajszic (Bajramovic, Vucinic) – 37:55 | 3–3 |
| Bajramovic (Silajszic, Vucinic) – 40:44 | 4–3 |
| | 4–4 | 41:01 – L. Watthanaphaya (Thongin) |
| | 4–5 | 41:57 – Tiaowvanich (Prasertthanma) |
| | 4–6 | 58:36 – Tiaowvanich (Jorjaroenruk) (ENG) |

10 min
Penalties
4 min
21
Shots
38

| 20 January 2026; 16:30 | Belgium | 2–3 GWS (2–0, 0–1, 0–1) (OT: 0–0) (SO: 0–1) | Turkey | Winter Sports Palace, Sofia; Attendance: 34 |

Game reference

Thijs Scheyltjens
Goalies
Kayra Aydos
Referee:
(Netherlands) Ramon Sterkens
Linesmen:
(Croatia) Marko Sakovic
(Norway) Niklas Wilhelmsen

| Geenen (Brande, Schoovaertz) (PP) – 12:28 | 1–0 |
| Cuvelier (Willems, Gregory) – 17:29 | 2–0 |
| | 2–1 | 24:36 – Serik (Bayazit) |
| | 2–2 | 51:47 – Yavuz (Catakli) |

Bober (miss)
Geenen (miss)
Gommeren (miss)
Cuvelier (miss)
Shootout
Karadag
(miss) Yavuz
Inandi
10 min
Penalties
10 min
28
Shots
32

| 20 January 2026; 20:00 | Chinese Taipei | 9–5 (1–0, 4–3, 4–2) | Bulgaria | Winter Sports Palace, Sofia; Attendance: 250 |

Game reference

Hao-Hsuan Kao
Goalies
Nikola Stefanov
Georgi Milanov
Referee:
(Spain) Alexey Roshchyn
Linesmen:
(Netherlands) Lodewijk Beelen
(Turkey) Alkan Kilinc

| Chi (Tsai) – 17:49 | 1–0 |
| | 1–1 | 20:12 – Pandilov (Stanimirov) |
| Chang (Tsui) – 21:43 | 2–1 |
| Liu, (Chi) – 24:04 | 3–1 |
| Hsiao (K. C. Wang, Liu) – 31:05 | 4–1 |
| K. C. Wang – 35:08 | 5–1 |
| | 5–2 | 36:32 – Stanimirov (Todorov, Stamenov) |
| | 5–3 | 38:31 – Kozhuharov (Dikov, Krushichki) |
| K. C. Wang (Hsiao) – 40:25 | 6–3 |
| Chi (Tsui) – 43:33 | 7–3 |
| K. C. Wang – 43:55 | 8–3 |
| | 8–4 | 53:27 – Kozhuharov (Dikov, Stamenov) (PP2) |
| | 8–5 | 54:21 – Stanimirov (Dikov, Todorov) (PP) |
| Tsai (Tsui, K. C. Wang) (PP) – 57:46 | 9–5 |

33 min
Penalties
2 min
26
Shots
31

| 22 January 2026; 13:00 | Chinese Taipei | 8–1 (3–0, 2–1, 3–0) | Thailand | Winter Sports Palace, Sofia; Attendance: 15 |

Game reference

Hao-Hsuan Kao
Goalies
Teeranon Ardharn
Referee:
(Mexico) Oscar Perez
Linesmen:
(Israel) Ariel Levites
(Latvia) Vladislavs Odins

| Lai (Tsai, Tsui) – 01:32 | 1–0 |
| Hsiao (Liu, K. C. Wang) – 03:18 | 2–0 |
| Tsui (Tsai) – 09:55 | 3–0 |
| | 3–1 | 20:08 – Teep. Pararamasakul (Teet. Pararamasakul) |
| Lai (Tsai, Chi) (PP) – 22:17 | 4–1 |
| Liu (Hsiao, K. C. Wang) – 36:03 | 5–1 |
| T. Chen (Lin) – 54:17 | 6–1 |
| Tsui (Chi, Tsai) (PP) – 56:08 | 7–1 |
| T. Chen (K. Y. Wang) – 56:31 | 8–1 |

3 min
Penalties
10 min
39
Shots
16

| 22 January 2026; 16:30 | Belgium | 11–1 (4–0, 3–0, 4–1) | Bosnia and Herzegovina | Winter Sports Palace, Sofia; Attendance: 35 |

Game reference

Kristof Verlinden
Goalies
Ajnur Husejnovic
Referee:
(Iceland) Sindri Gunnarsson
Linesmen:
(Bulgaria) Konstantin Dikov
(Norway) Niklas Wilhelmsen

| Gommeren (Bober) – 00:51 | 1–0 |
| Schoovaerts (Geenen) – 10:56 | 2–0 |
| Gommeren (Pandini, Hendrix) – 11:51 | 3–0 |
| Geenen (de Bruijn) – 18:34 | 4–0 |
| Bober (Gommeren, Ruth) (SH) – 24:04 | 5–0 |
| Mansfeld (Hendrix, Monsieurs) – 30:57 | 6–0 |
| Bober (Cuvelier, Gommeren) – 35:47 | 7–0 |
| Schoovaerts (Geenen, Wagemans) – 43:17 | 8–0 |
| de Bruijn (van de Brande) – 48:13 | 9–0 |
| de Bruijn – 50:39 | 10–0 |
| | 10–1 | 57:45 – Bajramovic (Silajszic) |
| Hendrix (Schoovaerts, Laeremans) – 58:07 | 11–1 |

14 min
Penalties
2 min
42
Shots
17

| 22 January 2026; 20:00 | Bulgaria | 6–1 (3–0, 1–1, 2–0) | Turkey | Winter Sports Palace, Sofia; Attendance: 516 |

Game reference

Georgi Milanov
Goalies
Kayra Aydos
Referee:
(Netherlands) Ramon Sterkens
Linesmen:
(Netherlands) Lodewijk Beelen
(Croatia) Marko Sakovic

| Stanimirov (Kozhuharov) – 04:22 | 1–0 |
| Todorov (Stanimirov) (PP) – 10:48 | 2–0 |
| Stanimirov (Gyurkov) – 11:23 | 3–0 |
| Stamenov (Krastev, Mitrikov) – 20:38 | 4–0 |
| | 4–1 | 30:17 – Inandi (Serik, Girgin) (PP) |
| Mitrikov (Kozhuharov, Krushichki) – 49:48 | 5–1 |
| Mitrikov (Dikov, Stamenov) (PP) – 54:27 | 6–1 |

8 min
Penalties
44 min
17
Shots
21

| 24 January 2026; 13:00 | Turkey | 4–5 (0–2, 3–1, 1–2) | Chinese Taipei | Winter Sports Palace, Sofia; Attendance: 37 |

Game reference

Kayra Aydos
Mustafa Findikoglu
Goalies
Hao-Hsuan Kao
Referee:
(Iceland) Sindri Gunnarsson
Linesmen:
(Bulgaria) Konstantin Dikov
(Croatia) Marko Sakovic

| | 0–1 | 12:09 – K. Peng |
| | 0–2 | 14:07 – Y. Chen (Hsiao, Liao) (PP2) |
| Inandi (Girgin) – 25:57 | 1–2 |
| | 1–3 | 30:34 – Liu (Hsiao, Chi) (PP) |
| Inandi (Yayilkan, Yavuz) – 34:26 | 2–3 |
| Odabas (Ozgun, Girgin) – 38:28 | 3–3 |
| Inandi (Yavuz, Kocak) (PP) – 45:25 | 4–3 |
| | 4–4 | 55:39 – Tsai (SH) |
| | 4–5 | 59:36 – Y. Chen (Tsui, K. Y. Wang) |

35 min
Penalties
6 min
20
Shots
33

| 24 January 2026; 16:30 | Bosnia and Herzegovina | 0–8 (0–3, 0–3, 0–2) | Bulgaria | Winter Sports Palace, Sofia; Attendance: 467 |

Game reference

Tarik Mulabegovic
Ajnur Husejnovic
Goalies
Georgi Milanov
Referee:
(Spain) Alexey Roshchyn
Linesmen:
(Netherlands) Lodewijk Beelen
(Norway) Niklas Wilhelmsen

| 0–1 | 02:23 – Stanimirov (Todorov) |
| 0–2 | 09:08 – Todorov (Stamenov, Pandilov) |
| 0–3 | 14:46 – Stanimirov (Todorov, Zhekov) |
| 0–4 | 31:10 – Gyurkov (Stanimirov) |
| 0–5 | 31:18 – Stanimirov (Todorov) |
| 0–6 | 35:02 – Kozhuharov (Mitrikov, Mladenov) |
| 0–7 | 50:37 – Mitev (Slavkov, Zhekov) |
| 0–8 | 51:29 – Gyurkov (Stanimirov, Todorov) |

6 min
Penalties
4 min
16
Shots
51

| 24 January 2026; 20:00 | Thailand | 3–7 (1–2, 0–2, 2–3) | Belgium | Winter Sports Palace, Sofia; Attendance: 50 |

Game reference

Teeranon Ardharn
Goalies
Thijs Scheyltjens
Kristof Verlinden
Referee:
(Mexico) Oscar Perez
Linesmen:
(Turkey) Alkan Kilinc
(Israel) Ariel Levites

| Teet. Pataramasakul (W. Watthanaphaya) (PP) – 10:15 | 1–0 |
| | 1–1 | 15:12 – Bober |
| | 1–2 | 15:30 – Schoovaerts (Laeremans, Hendrix) |
| | 1–3 | 31:42 – Laeremans (Hendrix, Schoovaerts) |
| | 1–4 | 37:34 – vand de Brande (de Bruijn, Monsieurs) |
| Tiaowvanich (L. Watthanaphaya) – 40:49 | 2–4 |
| | 2–5 | 42:37 – Wagemans (de Bruijn) (PP) |
| | 2–6 | 52:18 – Delport (Bober, Mansfeld) (PP) |
| | 2–7 | 54:02 – Hendrix (Wagemans, Laeremans) (PP2) |
| Tiaowvanich (Thongin) – 56:11 | 3–7 |

12 min
Penalties
8 min
7
Shots
28

| 25 January 2026; 13:00 | Turkey | 16–1 (6–0, 5–1, 5–0) | Bosnia and Herzegovina | Winter Sports Palace, Sofia; Attendance: 28 |

Game reference

Kayra Aydos
Mustafa Findikoglu
Goalies
Arman Bajramovic
Tarik Mulabegovic
Referee:
(Iceland) Sindri Gunnarsson
Linesmen:
(Bulgaria) Konstantin Dikov
(Croatia) Marko Sakovic

| Yayilkan (Karadag) – 07:40 | 1–0 |
| Odabas (Yayilkan, Catakli) – 07:50 | 2–0 |
| Odabas (Yayilkan) – 13:02 | 3–0 |
| Odabas (Karadag, Yayilkan) – 16:22 | 4–0 |
| Karadag (Odabas) (SH) – 18:33 | 5–0 |
| Inandi (Yavuz, Bayazit) (SH) – 19:35 | 6–0 |
| Shagin (Inandi) – 23:53 | 7–0 |
| Karadag (Inandi, Girgin) (PP) – 29:01 | 8–0 |
| Serik (Kocak) – 31:06 | 9–0 |
| Inandi (Karadag) (SH) – 33:43 | 10–0 |
| | 10–1 | 34:40 – Bajramovic (PP) |
| Inandi (Yavuz, Yayilkan) – 36:56 | 11–1 |
| Yayilkan (Yavuz) – 40:47 | 12–1 |
| Inandi (Shagin, Odabas) – 41:12 | 13–1 |
| Odabas (Inandi, Girgin) (PP) – 42:49 | 14–1 |
| Girgin (Yayilkan, Inandi) (PP) – 52:57 | 15–1 |
| Inandi (Odabas, Karadag) (PP) – 55:18 | 16–1 |

10 min
Penalties
12 min
55
Shots
7

| 25 January 2026; 16:30 | Belgium | 4–5 GWS (1–1, 1–2, 2–1) (OT: 0–0) (SO: 0–1) | Chinese Taipei | Winter Sports Palace, Sofia; Attendance: 54 |

Game reference

Thijs Scheyltjens
Goalies
Lilong Chen
Referee:
(Netherlands) Ramon Sterkens
Linesmen:
(Turkey) Alkan Kilinc
(Norway) Niklas Wilhelmsen

| | 0–1 | 07:30 – Liu (K. Peng, Wu) (PP) |
| Schoovaerts (Hendrix, Geenen) – 08:51 | 1–1 |
| Delport (Bober) (PP) – 22:26 | 2–1 |
| | 2–2 | 30:14 – Y. Chen |
| | 2–3 | 31:09 – Hung (Lin) |
| | 2–4 | 41:12 – L. Peng (Tsui, Tsai) |
| Wagemans (van de Brande) (PP) – 50:07 | 3–4 |
| Delport (Bober) – 53:35 | 4–4 |

Schoovaerts (miss)
Schoovaerts
Delport (miss)
Hendrix (miss)
de Bruijn (miss)
Shootout
Tsai
(miss) Liu
Tsui
(miss) Chi
8 min
Penalties
39 min
36
Shots
27

| 25 January 2026; 20:00 | Bulgaria | 6–0 (2–0, 1–0, 3–0) | Thailand | Winter Sports Palace, Sofia; Attendance: 433 |

Game reference

Georgi Milanov
Goalies
Teeranon Ardharn
Khongchana In-Worn
Referee:
(Mexico) Oscar Perez
Linesmen:
(Israel) Ariel Levites
(Latvia) Vladislavs Odins

| Krushichki – 02:11 | 1–0 |
| Mitrikov (Kozhuharov, Krushichki) – 08:25 | 2–0 |
| Gyurkov (Mitrikov) – 24:37 | 3–0 |
| Dikov (Stanimirov, Todorov) (PP) – 50:41 | 4–0 |
| Mitrikov (Krushichki) – 52:56 | 5–0 |
| Stanimirov (Todorov, Slavkov) (PP) – 57:01 | 6–0 |

0 min
Penalties
40 min
36
Shots
12

=== Statistics ===
==== Top 10 scorers ====
| Pos | Player | Country | GP | G | A | Pts | +/– | PIM |
|---|---|---|---|---|---|---|---|---|
| 1 | Emin İnandı | Turkey | 5 | 10 | 6 | 16 | +4 | 6 |
| 2 | Aleksandar Stanimirov | Bulgaria | 5 | 10 | 5 | 15 | +7 | 2 |
| 3 | Tsai Cheng-Yuan | Chinese Taipei | 5 | 3 | 9 | 12 | +8 | 0 |
| 4 | Antani Todorov | Bulgaria | 5 | 2 | 10 | 12 | +8 | 0 |
| 5 | Wang Kuan-Che | Chinese Taipei | 5 | 5 | 6 | 11 | +9 | 2 |
| 6 | Arhan Girgin | Turkey | 5 | 4 | 7 | 11 | +7 | 4 |
| 7 | Tsui Shuo-En | Chinese Taipei | 5 | 3 | 8 | 11 | +8 | 8 |
| 7 | Abdullah Yayilkan | Turkey | 5 | 3 | 8 | 11 | +10 | 4 |
| 9 | Liu Kuan-Ting | Chinese Taipei | 5 | 6 | 3 | 9 | +11 | 0 |
| 10 | Ege Odabaş | Turkey | 5 | 5 | 4 | 9 | +6 | 0 |

GP = Games played; G = Goals; A = Assists; Pts = Points; +/− = P Plus–minus; PIM = Penalties In Minutes
Source: IIHF

==== Goaltending leaders ====
(minimum 40% team's total ice time)

| Pos | Player | Country | TOI | GA | Sv% | GAA | SO |
|---|---|---|---|---|---|---|---|
| 1 | Georgi Milanov | Bulgaria | 268:56 | 8 | 90.00 | 1.78 | 2 |
| 2 | Thijs Scheyltjens | Belgium | 234:07 | 11 | 86.90 | 2.82 | 0 |
| 3 | Kayra Aydos | Turkey | 250:30 | 13 | 86.02 | 3.11 | 0 |
| 4 | Kao Hao-Hsuan | Chinese Taipei | 206:03 | 10 | 85.71 | 2.91 | 0 |
| 5 | Teeranon Ardharn | Thailand | 297:01 | 35 | 78:53 | 7.07 | 0 |

TOI = Time on ice (minutes:seconds); GA = Goals against; GAA = Goals against average; Sv% = Save percentage; SO = Shutouts
Source: IIHF

==== Best Players Selected by the Directorate ====
- Goaltender: (Bulgaria) Georgi Milanov
- Defenceman: (Bulgaria) Alexander Stamenov
- Forward: (Turkey) Emin İnandı

Source: IIHF

== Division III B ==
2026 IIHF U20 World Championship Division III B

Tournament details
- Host country: Kyrgyzstan
- City: Bishkek
- Venue: 1 (in 1 host city)
- Dates: 18–24 January 2026
- Teams: 6

Tournament statistics
- Games played: 15
- Goals scored: 123 (8.2 per game)
- Attendance: 10,698 (713 per game)
- Scoring leader: (Kyrgyzstan) Aikhan Ali-Askarov (20 points)

Official website
- www.iihf.com

The Division III B tournament was played in Bishkek, Kyrgyzstan, from 18 to 24 January 2026.

=== Participating teams ===
| Team | Qualification |
|---|---|
| Mexico | placed 6th in Division III A last year and were relegated |
| Kyrgyzstan (hosts) | placed 2nd in Division III B last year |
| South Africa | placed 3rd in Division III B last year |
| Luxembourg | placed 4th in Division III B last year |
| Hong Kong | first participation in World Championship |
| Iran | first participation in World Championship |

=== Standings ===
| Pos | Team | Pld | W | OTW | OTL | L | GF | GA | GD | Pts | Promotion |
|---|---|---|---|---|---|---|---|---|---|---|---|
| 1 | Kyrgyzstan (H) | 5 | 5 | 0 | 0 | 0 | 38 | 10 | +28 | 15 | Promotion to the 2027 Division III A |
| 2 | Hong Kong | 5 | 4 | 0 | 0 | 1 | 31 | 11 | +20 | 12 | |
| 3 | Mexico | 5 | 3 | 0 | 0 | 2 | 18 | 15 | +3 | 9 | |
| 4 | Luxembourg | 5 | 2 | 0 | 0 | 3 | 21 | 15 | +6 | 6 | |
| 5 | South Africa | 5 | 1 | 0 | 0 | 4 | 9 | 25 | −16 | 3 | |
| 6 | Iran | 5 | 0 | 0 | 0 | 5 | 6 | 47 | −41 | 0 | |

Source: IIHF
Rules for classification: 1) points; 2) head-to-head points; 3) head-to-head goal difference; 4) head-to-head number of goals scored; 5) result against closest best-ranked team outside tied teams; 6) result against next best-ranked team outside tied teams; 7) seeding before tournament.
(H) Host

=== Results ===
All times are local, KGT (UTC+6).

| 18 January 2026; 13:00 | South Africa | 1–2 (0–0, 1–1, 0–1) | Mexico | Gorodskoi Katok, Bishkek; Attendance: 108 |

Game reference

Nico Janse van Rensburg
Goalies
Santiago Cucuraqui
Referee:
(Romania) Cristian Filip
Linesmen:
(Kyrgyzstan) Yntymak Abdykalykov
(Uzbekistan) Sergey Ermakov

| van der Marwe (Bate, Paulsen) – 29:20 | 1–0 |
| | 1–1 | 38:31 – Abdala |
| | 1–2 | 47:31 – Bezares (Lara) |

14 min
Penalties
10 min
15
Shots
24

| 18 January 2026; 16:30 | Iran | 2–9 (1–4, 1–3, 0–2) | Luxembourg | Gorodskoi Katok, Bishkek; Attendance: 620 |

Game reference

Hossein Kakavand
Goalies
Hector Vincens
Pit Delia
Referee:
(Turkey) Murat Aygun
Linesmen:
(Bosnia and Herzegovina) Haris Mrkva
(Philippines) Kevin Anacta Tiongson

| | 0–1 | 04:59 – Konsbruck (PP) |
| | 0–2 | 07:21 – D'Andrea (Mota, Lasis) (PP) |
| Zanjani (Dehghani) – 07:45 | 1–2 |
| | 1–3 | 17:31 – Toft (PP) |
| | 1–4 | 19:39 – Lasis (Toft) |
| | 1–5 | 22:01 – Armuth (Mota) |
| Rezaei (Nagheli) – 22:39 | 2–5 |
| | 2–6 | 24:31 – Fleischmann (Cap, Toft) (PP) |
| | 2–7 | 36:03 – Mota (Mazurek, Lasis) (PP) |
| | 2–8 | 52:44 – Sindecuse (Lasis) (SH) |
| | 2–9 | 54:51 – Fleischmann (Chlumecky) |

22 min
Penalties
8 min
14
Shots
43

| 18 January 2026; 20:00 | Kyrgyzstan | 4–1 (0–0, 1–1, 3–0) | Hong Kong | Gorodskoi Katok, Bishkek; Attendance: 1,500 |

Game reference

Artem Vasilev
Goalies
Hoi Hei Moses Fung
Referee:
(Lithuania) Benas Jaksys
Linesmen:
(Iceland) Ingolfur Eliasson
(Estonia) Andre Vont

| Egemberiev (Ali-Askarov) (SH) – 21:10 | 1–0 |
| | 1–1 | 28:51 – Cheng (W. Wong, Liu) |
| Ali-Askarov – 50:41 | 2–1 |
| Egemberiev (Shamshybekov, Kalchaev) – 54:33 | 3–1 |
| Egemberiev (Dubanaev) (ENG) – 59:43 | 4–1 |

14 min
Penalties
10 min
34
Shots
21

| 19 January 2026; 13:00 | Mexico | 2–1 (1–0, 0–0, 1–1) | Luxembourg | Gorodskoi Katok, Bishkek; Attendance: 100 |

Game reference

Santiago Cucuraqui
Goalies
Hector Vincens
Referee:
(Bulgaria) Jan Vlacil
Linesmen:
(Iceland) Ingolfur Eliasson
(Bosnia and Herzegovina) Haris Mrkva

| Arriaga (Lara, Bezares) (PP) – 14:09 | 1–0 |
| Abdala (del Blanco) – 41:44 | 2–0 |
| | 2–1 | 53:52 – Cap (Lutov, Toft) (PP2) |

22 min
Penalties
20 min
12
Shots
19

| 19 January 2026; 16:30 | Hong Kong | 12–1 (8–0, 3–0, 1–1) | Iran | Gorodskoi Katok, Bishkek; Attendance: 300 |

Game reference

Michael Xy Kam Gan
Goalies
Hossein Kakavand
Referee:
(Lithuania) Benas Jaksys
Linesmen:
(Kyrgyzstan) Yntymak Abdykalykov
(Philippines) Kevin Anacta Tiongson

| Pang (Liu, Yi) – 03:08 | 1–0 |
| I. Chan (Wang, Zheng) (EA) – 07:15 | 2–0 |
| Liu (Pang, W. Wong) – 11:45 | 3–0 |
| Mok (Mak, Daly) – 15:09 | 4–0 |
| Koo (Zheng) – 17:13 | 5–0 |
| Daly (Mak, Mok) – 17:50 | 6–0 |
| Leung (Mok, Mak) – 19:18 | 7–0 |
| Daly (I. Chan, Leung) – 19:53 | 8–0 |
| Mak (Daly) – 31:01 | 9–0 |
| W. Wong (H. Chan, Pang) (PP2) – 34:40 | 10–0 |
| Pang (H. Chan) – 37:35 | 11–0 |
| | 11–1 | 48:15 – Nagheli (Jalali, Asharein) (SH) |
| Koo (Zheng, Wang) – 49:51 | 12–1 |

2 min
Penalties
10 min
39
Shots
7

| 19 January 2026; 20:00 | Kyrgyzstan | 7–2 (3–0, 1–1, 3–1) | South Africa | Gorodskoi Katok, Bishkek; Attendance: 1,000 |

Game reference

Emir Bolsunbekov
Goalies
Nico Janse van Rensburg
Aidan Cleinwerck
Referee:
(Turkey) Murat Aygun
Linesmen:
(Uzbekistan) Sergey Ermakov
(Chinese Taipei) Chang-Hsing Yang

| Leshchenko (Egemberiev) (PP) – 02:36 | 1–0 |
| Supokhunov (Dubanaev, Alybaev) – 16:12 | 2–0 |
| Egemberiev (Ali-Askarov) (SH) – 19:50 | 3–0 |
| Ali-Askarov (Esenov) – 22:03 | 4–0 |
| | 4–1 | 33:32 – Anker (van der Merwe) |
| Zholdoshbekov (Zhamansartov, Shumakov) – 46:15 | 5–1 |
| Egemberiev (Leshchenko) – 46:38 | 6–1 |
| | 6–2 | 51:12 – Anker (Bate, van der Merwe) |
| Leshchenko (Ali-Askarov) – 53:03 | 7–2 |

12 min
Penalties
10 min
37
Shots
9

| 21 January 2026; 13:00 | South Africa | 1–7 (0–3, 1–2, 0–2) | Luxembourg | Gorodskoi Katok, Bishkek; Attendance: 200 |

Game reference

Nico Janse van Rensburg
Goalies
Hector Vincens
Referee:
(Romania) Cristian Filip
Linesmen:
(Estonia) Andre Vont
(Chinese Taipei) Chang-Hsing Yang

| | 0–1 | 03:18 – Lasis (Armuth, Mota) |
| | 0–2 | 05:36 – Chlumecky (Fleischmann) (PP) |
| | 0–3 | 16:36 – Fleischmann (Lutov, Toft) (PP) |
| | 0–4 | 36:28 – Sindecuse (Lasis, Cap) |
| | 0–5 | 36:48 – Toft (Fleischmann, Lutov) |
| Bate – 39:25 | 1–5 |
| | 1–6 | 43:21 – Lutov (Fleischmann, Toft) |
| | 1–7 | 57:42 – Chlumecky (Lutov, Fleischmann) (PP) |

24 min
Penalties
22 min
9
Shots
38

| 21 January 2026; 16:30 | Mexico | 3–5 (0–1, 2–3, 1–1) | Hong Kong | Gorodskoi Katok, Bishkek; Attendance: 350 |

Game reference

Santiago Cucuraqui
Goalies
Hoi Hei Moses Fung
Referee:
(Lithuania) Benas Jaksys
Linesmen:
(Bosnia and Herzegovina) Haris Mrkva
(Philippines) Kevin Anacta Tiongson

| | 0–1 | 14:21 – W. Wong (Kwok, Cheng) (PP) |
| | 0–2 | 20:52 – H. Chan (Zheng, Koo) |
| | 0–3 | 26:28 – W. Wong (Kwok, Pang) (PP) |
| | 0–4 | 28:47 – Pang (W. Wong) (PP) |
| Parra (Lara, Natenzon) – 31:37 | 1–4 |
| Lara (Bezares, Parra) – 33:37 | 2–4 |
| | 2–5 | 42:02 – Choi (Mak, Yi) |
| Gordilio (Natenzon) – 50:52 | 3–5 |

8 min
Penalties
6 min
23
Shots
34

| 21 January 2026; 20:00 | Kyrgyzstan | 15–1 (8–0, 3–0, 4–1) | Iran | Gorodskoi Katok, Bishkek; Attendance: 1,500 |

Game reference

Artem Vasilev
Goalies
Hossein Kakavand
Mohsenreza Youneszadehshirazi
Referee:
(Bulgaria) Jan Vlacil
Linesmen:
(Iceland) Ingolfur Eliasson
(Uzbekistan) Sergey Ermakov

| Esenov (Ali-Askarov, Leshchenko) – 00:36 | 1–0 |
| Vitiazev (Egemberiev) – 02:32 | 2–0 |
| Ali-Askarov (Esenov) – 08:12 | 3–0 |
| Urankaiev (Dubanaev, Vitiazev) – 10:23 | 4–0 |
| Ali-Askarov (Esenov, Egemberiev) – 10:48 | 5–0 |
| Shumakov (Zholdoshbekov, Vitiazev) – 12:22 | 6–0 |
| Leshchenko (Ali-Askarov) – 14:05 | 7–0 |
| Esenov (Barmanov, Leshchenko) – 19:40 | 8–0 |
| Ali-Askarov (Esenov, Leshchenko) – 20:40 | 9–0 |
| Egemberiev (Ali-Askarov) – 24:09 | 10–0 |
| Ali-Askarov (Kalchaev, Egemberiev) (SH) – 35:24 | 11–0 |
| Egemberiev (Esenov, Ali-Askarov) – 44:19 | 12–0 |
| Egemberiev (Ali-Askarov) – 46:27 | 13–0 |
| Leshchenko (Esenov, Kalchaev) – 49:53 | 14–0 |
| Shamshybekov (Melisov, Shumakov) – 52:17 | 15–0 |
| | 15–1 | 59:30 – Dehghani |

8 min
Penalties
14 min
47
Shots
9

| 22 January 2026; 13:00 | Hong Kong | 8–1 (3–0, 2–1, 3–0) | South Africa | Gorodskoi Katok, Bishkek; Attendance: 200 |

Game reference

Michael Xy Kam Gan
Goalies
Nico Janse van Rensburg
Aidan Cleinwerck
Referee:
(Bulgaria) Jan Vlacil
Linesmen:
(Kyrgyzstan) Yntymak Abdykalykov
(Bosnia and Herzegovina) Haris Mrkva

| Wang (Koo, Yi) – 01:54 | 1–0 |
| Wang (Fung, H. Chan) (PP) – 05:13 | 2–0 |
| Choi (Mak, Cheng) – 16:08 | 3–0 |
| | 3–1 | 24:39 – Bate (SH) |
| Wang (Cheng, W. Wong) – 32:37 | 4–1 |
| Mak (Kwok, Cheng) – 34:27 | 5–1 |
| Liu (W. Wong) (SH) – 40:27 | 6–1 |
| Mak (Choi) – 48:32 | 7–1 |
| H. Chan (Mok) – 49:57 | 8–1 |

10 min
Penalties
12 min
53
Shots
14

| 22 January 2026; 16:30 | Iran | 1–7 (0–1, 0–4, 1–2) | Mexico | Gorodskoi Katok, Bishkek; Attendance: 320 |

Game reference

Hossein Kakavand
Mohsenreza Youneszadehshirazi
Goalies
Santiago Cucuraqui
Etham Mota
Referee:
(Turkey) Murat Aygun
Linesmen:
(Iceland) Ingolfur Eliasson
(Chinese Taipei) Chang-Hsing Yang

| | 0–1 | 06:20 – del Blanco (Hernandez, Lorenzana) (PP) |
| | 0–2 | 28:03 – Abdala (Lara) (PP) |
| | 0–3 | 29:13 – Carriles |
| | 0–4 | 30:42 – Carriles (Arriaga, Lara) |
| | 0–5 | 35:12 – Gallardo (Viruega, Molinar) |
| Mahmoodi – 45:17 | 1–5 |
| | 1–6 | 47:51 – Carriles (Ojeda) |
| | 1–7 | 50:19 – Gordillo (Molinar, del Blanco) |

20 min
Penalties
16 min
14
Shots
43

| 22 January 2026; 20:00 | Luxembourg | 2–5 (0–1, 0–3, 2–1) | Kyrgyzstan | Gorodskoi Katok, Bishkek; Attendance: 1,800 |

Game reference

Hector Vincens
Goalies
Artem Vasilev
Referee:
(Romania) Cristian Filip
Linesmen:
(Philippines) Kevin Anacta Tiongson
(Estonia) Andre Vont

| | 0–1 | 11:25 – Melisov (Vitiazev, Barmanov) |
| | 0–2 | 20:54 – Ali-Askarov |
| | 0–3 | 21:43 – Bem (Supokhunov, Shamshybekov) |
| | 0–4 | 35:09 – Shamshybekov (Bem, Supokhunov) |
| Lasis (Molitor, Cap) – 41:47 | 1–4 |
| | 1–5 | 44:08 – Armuth (Konsbruck, Mota) (PP) |
| Dubanaev – 45:08 | 2–5 |

12 min
Penalties
10 min
13
Shots
31

| 24 January 2026; 13:00 | Luxembourg | 2–5 (1–1, 0–2, 1–2) | Hong Kong | Gorodskoi Katok, Bishkek; Attendance: 400 |

Game reference

Hector Vincens
Goalies
Hoi Hei Moses Fung
Referee:
(Romania) Cristian Filip
Linesmen:
(Kyrgyzstan) Yntymak Abdykalykov
(Chinese Taipei) Chang-Hsing Yang

| | 0–1 | 10:44 – Wang (Fung, W. Wong) |
| Chlumecky (Cap, Toft) (PP2) – 18:04 | 1–1 |
| | 1–2 | 24:22 – Wang (Zheng, Koo) |
| | 1–3 | 26:31 – Choi (Mak, Koo) |
| Mota (Lasis) – 44:07 | 2–3 |
| | 2–4 | 46:53 – Liu (Pang, W. Wong) |
| | 2–5 | 54:37 – Wang (Kwok, Zheng) (PP) |

8 min
Penalties
37 min
17
Shots
17

| 24 January 2026; 16:30 | South Africa | 4–1 (2–0, 1–1, 1–0) | Iran | Gorodskoi Katok, Bishkek; Attendance: 300 |

Game reference

Nico Janse van Rensburg
Goalies
Hossein Kakavand
Referee:
(Lithuania) Benas Jaksys
Linesmen:
(Philippines) Kevin Anacta Tiongson
(Estonia) Andre Vont

| Bate (van der Marwe) – 4:33 | 1–0 |
| van der Marwe (Rodger) (PP) – 09:00 | 2–0 |
| Bate (PS) – 34:00 | 3–0 |
| | 3–1 | 35:43 – Mirbabaei (Asharein, Mamaghani) (PP) |
| Paulsen (Kamish, Sauer) – 44:45 | 4–1 |

18 min
Penalties
12 min
27
Shots
16

| 24 January 2026; 20:00 | Mexico | 4–7 (1–2, 1–3, 2–2) | Kyrgyzstan | Gorodskoi Katok, Bishkek; Attendance: 2,000 |

Game reference

Santiago Cucuraqui
Goalies
Artem Vasilev
Referee:
(Bulgaria) Jan Vlacil
Linesmen:
(Uzbekistan) Sergey Ermakov
(Bosnia and Herzegovina) Haris Mrkva

| | 0–1 | 08:18 – Egemberiev (Ali-Askarov) |
| Lorenzana (Hernandez) (PP) – 16:02 | 1–1 |
| | 1–2 | 19:09 – Ali-Askarov (Esenov, Egemberiev) |
| | 1–3 | 23:36 – Leshchenko (Egemberiev, Ali-Askarov) (PP) |
| Arriaga (Gordillo, Bezares) (PP) – 26:52 | 2–3 |
| | 2–4 | 28:10 – Melisov (Urankaiev, Dubanaev) |
| | 2–5 | 38:32 – Ali-Askarov (Leshchenko, Egemberiev) (PP) |
| | 2–6 | 42:43 – Ali-Askarov (Esenov, Leshchenko) (PP) |
| Abdala (Hernandez) – 44:23 | 3–6 |
| | 3–7 | 42:43 – Egemberiev (Esenov, Kalchaev) |
| Lorenzana (Arriaga) – 51:58 | 4–7 |

10 min
Penalties
8 min
17
Shots
23

=== Statistics ===
==== Top 10 scorers ====
| Pos | Player | Country | GP | G | A | Pts | +/– | PIM |
|---|---|---|---|---|---|---|---|---|
| 1 | Alikhan Ali-Askarov | Kyrgyzstan | 5 | 10 | 10 | 20 | +20 | 2 |
| 2 | Umar Egemberdiev | Kyrgyzstan | 5 | 10 | 7 | 17 | +21 | 4 |
| 3 | Egor Leshchenko | Kyrgyzstan | 5 | 5 | 6 | 11 | +19 | 10 |
| 4 | Umar Esenov | Kyrgyzstan | 5 | 2 | 9 | 11 | +19 | 6 |
| 5 | Wong Wai-sum | Hong Kong | 5 | 3 | 7 | 10 | +3 | 2 |
| 6 | Randolph Mak | Hong Kong | 5 | 3 | 6 | 9 | +6 | 2 |
| 7 | Wang Tsan-lam | Hong Kong | 5 | 6 | 2 | 8 | +7 | 2 |
| 8 | Magnuss Lasis | Luxembourg | 5 | 3 | 5 | 8 | 0 | 4 |
| 9 | Leopold Toft | Luxembourg | 5 | 2 | 6 | 8 | −2 | 2 |
| 10 | Martin Fleischmann | Luxembourg | 5 | 3 | 4 | 7 | –3 | 12 |
| 10 | Tim Pang | Chinese Taipei | 5 | 3 | 4 | 7 | –1 | 6 |

GP = Games played; G = Goals; A = Assists; Pts = Points; +/− = P Plus–minus; PIM = Penalties In Minutes
Source: IIHF

==== Goaltending leaders ====
(minimum 40% team's total ice time)

| Pos | Player | Country | TOI | GA | Sv% | GAA | SO |
|---|---|---|---|---|---|---|---|
| 1 | Michael Gan | Hong Kong | 120:00 | 3 | 90.48 | 1.00 | 0 |
| 2 | Moses Fung | Hong Kong | 177:28 | 8 | 89.04 | 2.70 | 0 |
| 3 | Artem Vasilev | Kyrgyzstan | 240:00 | 8 | 86.67 | 2.00 | 0 |
| 4 | Santiago Cucuraqui | Mexico | 290:04 | 15 | 85.15 | 3.10 | 0 |
| 5 | Nico Janse van Rensburg | South Africa | 294:48 | 25 | 84.85 | 5.09 | 0 |

TOI = Time on ice (minutes:seconds); GA = Goals against; GAA = Goals against average; Sv% = Save percentage; SO = Shutouts
Source: IIHF

==== Best Players Selected by the Directorate ====
- Goaltender: (Mexico) Santiago Cucuraqui
- Defenceman: (Kyrgyzstan) Egor Leshchenko
- Forward: (Kyrgyzstan) Alikhan Ali-Askarov

Source: IIHF
