= South Africa men's national junior ice hockey team =

South Africa
- Association: South African Ice Hockey Federation
- General manager: Aqueelah Kamish
- Head coach: Gavin Smith
- Assistants: Mogamat Kamish
- Most games: Ryan Marsh (19); Christopher Engelbrecht (19)
- Most points: Gregory Donde (17)
- Home stadium: Grandwest Ice Arena
- Team colors
- IIHF code: RSA

First international
- Yugoslavia 8 – 1 South Africa (Tallinn, Estonia; 1 January 1996)

Biggest win
- South Africa 12 – 1 Bulgaria (Mexico City, Mexico; 15 January 2000)

Biggest defeat
- Australia 28 – 0 South Africa (Istanbul, Turkey; 30 January 2023)

IIHF World Junior Championship
- Appearances: 23 (first in 1996)
- Best result: 31st (2002)

International record (W–L–T)
- 12–38–2

The South Africa men's national under-20 ice hockey team is the national under-20 ice hockey team of South Africa. The team is controlled by the South African Ice Hockey Federation and a member of the International Ice Hockey Federation (IIHF).

== History ==
South Africa played its first game in 1996 against Yugoslavia during the Group D tournament of the 1996 World Junior Ice Hockey Championships. South Africa lost the game 8–1. South Africa continued to play in Group D during the World Junior Ice Hockey Championships until 2001 where the International Ice Hockey Federation changed to playing format. South Africa was reseeded into the newly formed Division III tournament of the World Junior Ice Hockey Championships. In 2002 South Africa gained promotion to Division II due to a restructuring that would increase the number of teams in Division II from eight to twelve. The following year South Africa suffered their largest defeat against Great Britain during the 2003 World Junior Ice Hockey Championships Division II Group A tournament. Great Britain shutout South Africa winning the game 21–0. In 2004 South Africa finished last in their Division II Group B tournament and were relegated to Division III for the following year.

South Africa did not participate in the following two World Championships, but returned to Division III for the 2008 World Junior Ice Hockey Championships, finishing fifth in the group of seven.

== International competitions ==
=== World Junior Championships ===
- 1996 – 6th in Pool D (32nd overall)
- 1997 – 7th in Pool D (33rd overall)
- 1998 – 7th in Pool D (33rd overall)
- 1999 – 6th in Pool D (32nd overall)
- 2000 – 6th in Pool D (32nd overall)
- 2001 – 6th in Division III (32nd overall)
- 2002 – 5th in Division III (31st overall)
- 2003 – 5th in Division II Group A (32nd overall)
- 2004 – 6th in Division II Group B (33rd overall)
- 2005 – 4th in Division III (38th overall)
- 2006–2007 – Did not participate
- 2008 – 5th in Division III (39th overall)
- 2009–2013 – Did not participate
- 2014 – 5th in Division III (39th overall)
- 2015 – 4th in Division III (38th overall)
- 2016 – 6th in Division III (40th overall)
- 2017 – 8th in Division III (42nd overall)
- 2018 – 1st in Division III Qualifiers (41st overall)
- 2019 – 7th in Division III (41st overall)
- 2020 – 8th in Division III (42nd overall)
- 2021 – Cancelled
- 2022 – 8th in Division III (42nd overall)
- 2023 – 8th in Division III (42nd overall)
- 2024 – 3rd in Division IIIB (43rd overall)
- 2025 – 3rd in Division IIIB (43rd Overall)
- 2026 – 5th in Division IIIB (45th overall)
