= Armenia men's national junior ice hockey team =

Armenia
- Association: Ice Hockey Federation of Armenia
- General manager: (Armenia) Karen Khachatryan
- Head coach: (United States) Douglas Decesare
- Assistants: (Armenia) Manuk Balyan (Armenia) Raffi Kajberouni
- Top scorer: Harutyun Qeshishyan (21)
- Most points: Harutyun Qeshishyan (38)
- Team colors
- IIHF code: ARM

First international
- Iceland 50 - 0 Armenia (Elektrėnai, Lithuania; April 1, 2006)

Biggest win
- Armenia 13 - 1 South Africa (Belgrade, Serbia; January 16, 2008); Armenia 13 - 1 Turkey (Belgrade, Serbia; January 17, 2008)

Biggest defeat
- Iceland 50 - 0 Armenia (Elektrėnai, Lithuania; April 1, 2006)

IIHF World U20 Championship
- Appearances: 3 (first in 2006)
- Best result: 35th (2008)

International record (W–L–T)
- 6-9-0

The Armenia men's national under 20 ice hockey team is the national under-20 ice hockey team in Armenia. The team is managed by the Ice Hockey Federation of Armenia, a member of the International Ice Hockey Federation.

== History ==
Armenia played its first game during the 2006 World Junior Ice Hockey Championships against Iceland which they lost 50–0. The game is recorded as Armenia's largest loss in international participation. The game was part of the Division I tournament being held in Elektrenai, Lithuania. Armenia finished last in the tournament after losing all four of their games against Bulgaria, Iceland, Lithuania, and Turkey. The following year they competed at the 2007 World Junior Ice Hockey Championships Division III tournament being held in Ankara, Turkey. Armenia competed in five games, winning against Bulgaria and Turkey, losing in overtime to New Zealand, and losing outright to both Belgium and China.

In 2008 Armenia entered the Division III tournament of the 2008 World Junior Ice Hockey Championships being held in Belgrade, Serbia. They finished third in the tournament after wins against Australia, Bulgaria, South Africa, and Turkey and losses to New Zealand and Serbia. The games against South Africa and Turkey ended in the score of 13–1 which is Armenia's largest ever victory in international participation.

== International competitions ==
- 2006 World Junior Ice Hockey Championships. Finish: 5th in Division III (39th overall)
- 2007 World Junior Ice Hockey Championships. Finish: 4th in Division III (37th overall)
- 2008 World Junior Ice Hockey Championships. Finish: 3rd in Division III (35th overall)

== See also ==
- Armenian Hockey League
- Armenia men's national under-18 ice hockey team
- Armenia national ice hockey team
- Ice hockey in Armenia
- Sport in Armenia
