= Mexico men's national junior ice hockey team =

Mexico
- Association: Mexico Ice Hockey Federation
- General manager: (Mexico) Emilio Botello
- Head coach: (Mexico) Diego de La Garma
- Assistants: (Mexico) Joaquin Oviedo
- Captain: Francisco Padilla
- Most points: Santiago Sierra (20)
- Team colors
- IIHF code: MEX

First international
- Spain 13 – 1 Mexico (Sofia, Bulgaria; December 30, 1996)

Biggest win
- Mexico 28 – 0 Turkey (Novi Sad, Yugoslavia; December 31, 1998)

Biggest defeat
- Hungary 28 – 0 Mexico (Debrecen, Hungary; December 14, 2009

IIHF World U20 Championship
- Appearances: 29 (first in 1997)
- Best result: 30th (2009)

International record (W–L–T)
- 32–45–8

The Mexican men's national under 20 ice hockey team is the national under-20 ice hockey team in Mexico. The team represents Mexico at the International Ice Hockey Federation's IIHF World U20 Championship.

== International competitions ==
=== World Junior Championships ===
- 1997 – 34th overall (8th in Pool D)
- 1998 – 31st overall (5th in Pool D)
- 1999 – 31st overall (5th in Pool D)
- 2000 – 31st overall (5th in Pool D)
- 2001 – 33rd overall (7th in Division III)
- 2002 – 33rd overall (7th in Division III)
- 2003 – 34th overall (6th in Division II, Group B)
- 2004 – 37th overall (3rd in Division III)
- 2005 – 35th overall (1st in Division III)
- 2006 – 32nd overall (5th in Division II, Group B)
- 2007 – 32nd overall (5th in Division II, Group B)
- 2008 – 32nd overall (5th in Division IIB)
- 2009 – 30th overall (4th in Division IIB)
- 2010 – 34th overall (6th in Division IIB)
- 2011 – 35th overall (1st in Division III)
- 2012 – 34th overall (6th in Division IIB)
- 2013 – 38th overall (4th in Division III)
- 2014 – 37th overall (3rd in Division III)
- 2015 – 37th overall (3rd in Division III)
- 2016 – 35th overall (1st in Division III)
- 2017 – 33rd overall (5th in Division IIB)
- 2018 – 33rd overall (5th in Division IIB)
- 2019 – 34th overall (6th in Division IIB)
- 2020 – 38th overall (4th in Division III)
- 2021 – Cancelled due to COVID-19 pandemic
- 2022 – 36th overall (2nd in Division III)
- 2023 – 34th overall (6th in Division IIB)
- 2024 – 39th overall (5th in Division IIIA)
- 2025 – 40th overall (6th in Division IIIA)
- 2026 – 43rd overall (3rd in Division IIIB)
