= 2016 World Junior Ice Hockey Championships – Division III =

2016 IIHF U20 World Championship Division III

Tournament details
- Host country: Mexico
- City: Mexico City
- Venue: 1 (in 1 host city)
- Dates: 15–24 January 2016
- Teams: 7

Official website
- www.iihf.com

The 2016 World Junior Ice Hockey Championship Division III was an international ice hockey tournament organized by the International Ice Hockey Federation. It was played in Mexico City, Mexico, from 15 to 24 January 2016. Division III represents the sixth tier of the World Junior Ice Hockey Championships. The champions, Mexico, were promoted to the Division II B for the 2017 tournament, and the last-placed nation (South Africa) were to be relegated to a qualification tournament for 2017, instead an eight-team Division III tournament was decided on in September 2016. Israel participated in a World Junior tournament for the first time since 1997, while Bulgaria returned after withdrawing from the 2015 tournament.

== Participating teams ==
Team	Qualification
Iceland	placed 6th in Division II B last year and were relegated
New Zealand	placed 2nd in Division III last year
Mexico	hosts; placed 3rd in Division III last year
South Africa	placed 4th in Division III last year
Turkey	placed 5th in Division III last year
Bulgaria	withdrew from competition last year
Israel	last participated in 1997

== Final standings ==
Pos	Team	Pld	W	OTW	OTL	L	GF	GA	GD	Pts	Promotion
1	Mexico (H)	6	5	0	0	1	24	14	+10	15	Promoted to the 2017 Division II B
2	Bulgaria	6	4	0	0	2	18	13	+5	12	
3	New Zealand	6	4	0	0	2	29	16	+13	12	
4	Israel	6	3	0	1	2	39	23	+16	10	
5	Iceland	6	2	1	0	3	24	21	+3	8	
6	Turkey	6	2	0	0	4	20	15	+5	6	
7	South Africa	6	0	0	0	6	7	59	−52	0	

Source: IIHF
Rules for classification: 1) points; 2) head-to-head points; 3) head-to-head goal difference; 4) head-to-head number of goals scored; 5) result against closest best-ranked team outside tied teams; 6) result against second-best-ranked team outside tied teams; 7) seeding before tournament.
(H) Host

== Match results ==
All times are local (Central Standard Time – UTC–6).

15 January 2016; 13:00	New Zealand	1–4 (0–2, 1–0, 0–2)	Bulgaria	Ice Dome, Mexico City; Attendance: 100

Game reference

Liam Henare
Goalies
Dimitar Dimitrov
Referee:
(Denmark) Jens Christian Gregersen
Linesmen:
(Canada) Maxime Chaput
(Mexico) Sem Ramirez

	0–1	08:59 – Gatchev (Chompolov, Blagoev)
	0–2	12:08 – Dikov (V. Vasilev, M. Vasilev) (PP)
J. Rawiri (Leahy) – 26:54	1–2
	1–3	52:19 – Dikov (M. Vasilev, T. Georgiev) (PP)
	1–4	58:21 – Dikov (M. Vasilev)

47 min
Penalties
6 min
40
Shots
35

15 January 2016; 16:15	South Africa	0–10 (0–5, 0–3, 0–2)	Turkey	Ice Dome, Mexico City; Attendance: 100

Game reference

Marcello Strydom
Aslam Khan
Goalies
Tolga Bozaci
Referee:
(Canada) Michael Campbell
Linesmen:
(Mexico) David Campillo
(Netherlands) Stef Oosterling

0–1	08:30 – Kuntel (Ulas)
0–2	12:38 – Hars (H. Secer, Faner) (PP)
0–3	13:44 – Kavaz (Hars, H. Secer)
0–4	14:08 – H. Salt (H. Secer, Bakal)
0–5	14:40 – H. Salt
0–6	21:35 – H. Salt (Savas)
0–7	26:30 – Uzunali (H. Salt, K. Salt)
0–8	30:01 – O. Kars (K. Salt) (PP)
0–9	51:40 – Hars (Y. Kars)
0–10	58:30 – Savas (O. Kars, Takar)

12 min
Penalties
4 min
8
Shots
65

15 January 2016; 20:30	Mexico	6–5 (1–2, 4–2, 1–1)	Israel	Ice Dome, Mexico City; Attendance: 1750

Game reference

Jaime Perez
Goalies
Maxim Gokhberg
Referee:
(United States) Jeremy Tufts
Linesmen:
(Germany) Jan-Christian Muller
(United States) James Scarpace

	0–1	01:52 – Spektor (R. Aharonovich, Vinitzki)
Najera (Garcia, Dunn) (PP) – 07:24	1–1
	1–2	19:56 – Spektor (R. Aharonovich)
Jo. Perez (Bermejo, Cosio) – 20:47	2–2
Najera (SH) – 22:54	3–2
	3–3	31:51 – Spektor (R. Aharonovich) (PP)
Senties (Alva) – 35:27	4–3
Bermejo – 38:05	5–3
	5–4	38:35 – Revniaga (Kafri, Avraham)
Garcia (Alva) – 52:07	6–4
	6–5	57:47 – Spektor (Boudnikov, T. Aharonovich)

18 min
Penalties
12 min
38
Shots
48

16 January 2016; 17:00	Iceland	2–4 (1–2, 1–1, 0–1)	Bulgaria	Ice Dome, Mexico City; Attendance: 125

Game reference

Atti Valdimarsson
Goalies
Dimitar Dimitrov
Referee:
(Slovakia) Miroslav Stefik
Linesmen:
(Mexico) David Campillo
(Italy) Simone Mischiatti

	0–1	10:14 – M. Vasilev (Stoilov)
	0–2	12:39 – Dikov (T. Georgiev, M. Vasilev)
Arason (Maack) (PP) – 17:46	1–2
	1–3	24:17 – T. Georgiev (M. Vasilev) (PP)
Johannesson (Kristinsson, Maack) – 26:35	2–3
	2–4	48:44 – Dikov (Blagoev) (PP)

8 min
Penalties
18 min
40
Shots
27

16 January 2016; 20:15	Israel	2–6 (0–1, 2–2, 0–3)	New Zealand	Ice Dome, Mexico City; Attendance: 110

Game reference

Raz Werner
Goalies
Liam Henare
Referee:
(Canada) Michael Campbell
Linesmen:
(Germany) Jan-Christian Muller
(Mexico) Sem Ramirez

	0–1	16:27 – Hay (Orr, Carson-Pratt) (PP)
Revniaga (R. Aharonovich, Hoffman) (PP) – 25:22	1–1
	1–2	27:29 – Hay (Kennedy, Carson-Pratt) (PP)
	1–3	34:34 – Hay (SH)
Kozev (Vinitzki) (PP) – 35:45	2–3
	2–4	40:49 – Jonsson (Scott)
	2–5	41:27 – Scott (Jonsson)
	2–6	56:15 – M. Rawiri (J. Rawiri, Kennedy)

8 min
Penalties
31 min
38
Shots
34

17 January 2016; 20:00	Turkey	2–3 (1–0, 1–0, 0–3)	Mexico	Ice Dome, Mexico City; Attendance: 1000

Game reference

Tolga Bozaci
Goalies
Jaime Perez
Referee:
(Slovakia) Miroslav Stefik
Linesmen:
(Italy) Simone Mischiatti
(Netherlands) Stef Oosterling

H. Secer (Kavaz, O. Kars) (PP2) – 19:54	1–0
Bakal (Uzunali, Faner) (PP) – 20:46	2–0
	2–1	42:48 – Senties (Berard)
	2–2	54:26 – Benabib
	2–3	56:16 – Senties (Benabib, Jo. Perez) (PP)

24 min
Penalties
12 min
17
Shots
24

18 January 2016; 13:00	Iceland	6–5 GWS (2–1, 1–1, 2–3) (OT: 0–0) (SO: 2–0)	Israel	Ice Dome, Mexico City; Attendance: 100

Game reference

Atli Valdimarsson
Goalies
Maxim Gokhberg
Referee:
(Denmark) Jens Christian Gregersen
Linesmen:
(Netherlands) Stef Oosterling
(Mexico) Sem Ramirez

Induss (Olafsson) – 09:23	1–0
Arnason (Kristinsson, Maack) – 09:44	2–0
	2–1	15:19 – Revniaga (Avraham) (EA)
Sigrunarson – 29:29	3–1
	3–2	38:48 – Kafri (R. Aharonovich) (PP)
Sigrunarson (Arnason) – 48:37	4–2
	4–3	49:04 – Revniaga (Halpert, Kozev)
Olafsson (Johannsson) – 49:17	5–3
	5–4	58:21 – R. Aharonovich (Boudnikov) (EA)
	5–5	59:23 – R. Aharonovich (Spektor) (EA)

Sigrunarson
Olafsson
Shootout
(miss) Revniaga
(miss) Kafri
8 min
Penalties
12 min
25
Shots
24

18 January 2016; 16:15	South Africa	2–4 (0–2, 1–1, 1–1)	Bulgaria	Ice Dome, Mexico City; Attendance: 100

Game reference

Marcello Strydom
Goalies
Dimitar Dimitrov
Dimitar Videnov
Referee:
(United States) Jeremy Tufts
Linesmen:
(Germany) Jan-Christian Muller
(United States) James Scarpace

	0–1	0:15 – Dikov (Blagoev, M. Vasilev)
	0–2	16:20 – T. Georgiev (Dikov)
Saaiman (PP) – 23:04	1–2
	1–3	34:17 – T. Georgiev (Davidov, Dikov)
Bremner – 48:39	2–3
	2–4	57:39 – Mladenov (Dikov, M. Vasilev)

12 min
Penalties
10 min
17
Shots
36

18 January 2016; 20:00	New Zealand	3–2 (0–0, 2–0, 1–2)	Turkey	Ice Dome, Mexico City; Attendance: 100

Game reference

Liam Henare
Goalies
Tolga Bozaci
Referee:
(Slovakia) Miroslav Stefik
Linesmen:
(Mexico) David Campillo
(Canada) Maxime Chaput

Hay (Leahy) (SH) – 33:35	1–0
Kennedy (J. Rawiri, M. Rawiri) (PP) – 39:36	2–0
Hay (Orr) – 40:33	3–0
	3–1	44:10 – Uzunali (PP)
	3–2	45:49 – Bakal (Bingol) (PP)

24 min
Penalties
10 min
31
Shots
33

19 January 2016; 13:00	Israel	17–0 (5–0, 5–0, 7–0)	South Africa	Ice Dome, Mexico City; Attendance: 100

Game reference

Maxim Gokhberg
Raz Werner
Goalies
Marcello Strydom
Aslam Khan
Referee:
(Denmark) Jens Christian Gregersen
Linesmen:
(Canada) Maxime Chaput
(Italy) Simone Mischiatti

Spektor (Kozev, Revniaga) (PP) – 01:12	1–0
Avraham (Sever) – 06:18	2–0
Haver (Natalchenko) – 10:51	3–0
Boudnikov (Spektor, R. Aharonovich) – 14:21	4–0
Revniaga (Spektor, R. Aharonovich) (PP) – 18:21	5–0
Spektor (R. Aharonovich) – 23:17	6–0
Spektor (Boudnikov, R. Aharonovich) – 31:18	7–0
Revniaga (R. Aharonovich, Kafri) (PP2) – 33:08	8–0
R. Aharonovich (Boudnikov, Chernin) – 35:23	9–0
Natalchenko (Halpert, T. Aharonovich) – 36:50	10–0
Natalchenko (T. Aharanovich) – 44:35	11–0
Sever (Revniaga) – 45:44	12–0
Spektor (R. Aharonovich) – 47:21	13–0
Natalchenko (Kafri) – 48:16	14–0
R. Aharonovich – 49:04	15–0
Halpert (PS) – 56:44	16–0
Sever (Revniaga) (SH) – 59:42	17–0

27 min
Penalties
10 min
35
Shots
9

19 January 2016; 16:15	Turkey	3–0 (0–0, 1–0, 1–0)	Iceland	Ice Dome, Mexico City; Attendance: 75

Game reference

Tolga Bozaci
Goalies
Atti valdimarsson
Referee:
(United States) Jeremy Tufts
Linesmen:
(Mexico) David Campillo
(United States) James Scarpace

Bakal (Savas, H. Secer) (PP) – 31:48	1–0
Bakal (Uzunali, H. Secer) – 45:50	2–0
Faner (ENG) – 59:57	3–0

4 min
Penalties
12 min
15
Shots
17

19 January 2016; 20:00	Bulgaria	0–3 (0–2, 0–0, 0–1)	Mexico	Ice Dome, Mexico City; Attendance: 750

Game reference

Dimitar Dimitrov
Goalies
Jaime Perez
Referee:
(Canada) Michael Campbell
Linesmen:
(Germany) Jan-Christian Muller
(Netherlands) Stef Oosterling

0–1	07:40 – Cruz
0–2	16:12 – Cruz (PS)
0–3	57:08 – Fonseca (Ramos, Alva)

26 min
Penalties
10 min
18
Shots
32

21 January 2016; 13:00	Israel	4–3 (1–1, 2–1, 1–1)	Bulgaria	Ice Dome, Mexico City; Attendance: 70

Game reference

Maxim Gokhberg
Goalies
Dimitar Dimitrov
Referee:
(Slovakia) Miroslav Stefik
Linesmen:
(Mexico) David Campillo
(Italy) Simone Mischiatti

R. Aharonovich (Spektor) (PP) – 07:22	1–0
	1–1	18:36 – Dilkov (T. Georgiev)
	1–2	22:47 – Blagoev (V. Videnov)
R. Aharonovich (Kozev) – 34:11	2–2
Revniaga (Sever, Hoffman) – 39:03	3–2
R. Aharonovich (Boudnikov, Spektor) –51:48	4–2
	4–3	55:28 – T. Georgiev (M. Vasilev) (PP)

8 min
Penalties
4 min
28
Shots
18

21 January 2016; 16:15	Iceland	7–2 (3–0, 2–1, 2–1)	South Africa	Ice Dome, Mexico City; Attendance: 80

Game reference

Atti Valdimarsson
Goalies
Aslam Khan
Marcello Strydom
Referee:
(Canada) Michael Campbell
Linesmen:
(Canada) Maxime Chaput
(Mexico) Sem Ramirez

Kristinsson – 01:18	1–0
Maack (Olafsson) – 06:56	2–0
Lindal (Oskarsson) – 08:10	3–0
Arason (Kristinsson) – 21:54	4–0
Oskarsson (Maack, Johannesson) (PP) – 30:23	5–0
	5–1	33:57 – Johnson (Bremner)
Maack (Johannesson) – 45:59	6–1
Arason (Oskarsson) (PP) – 48:17	7–1
	7–2	59:13 – Bremner

6 min
Penalties
10 min
26
Shots
5

21 January 2016; 20:00	New Zealand	1–2 (1–1, 0–1, 0–0)	Mexico	Ice Dome, Mexico City; Attendance: 1000

Game reference

Liam Henare
Goalies
Jaime Perez
Referee:
(Denmark) Jens Christian Gregersen
Linesmen:
(Netherlands) Stef Oosterling
(United States) James Scarpace

	0–1	05:30 – A. Garcia (Dunn) (PP)
Kennedy (Vortanov, Hay) (PP) – 19:33	1–1
	1–2	31:34 – A. Garcia (Bermejo)

6 min
Penalties
8 min
24
Shots
25

22 January 2016; 13:00	Bulgaria	3–1 (1-0, 1-0, 1-1)	Turkey	Ice Dome, Mexico City; Attendance: 50

Game reference

Dimitar Dimitrov
Goalies
Tolga Bozaci
Referee:
(Denmark) Jens Christian Gregersen
Linesmen:
(Germany) Jan-Christian Muller
(Mexico) Jafet Ramirez

Chompolov (Stoilov, M. Vasilev) – 03:48	1–0
Tchaliov (M. Vasilev, Dikov) – 37:50	2–0
Blagoev (Genkov, Dilkov) – 48:11	3–0
	3–1	52:30 – Uzunali

8 min
Penalties
4 min
18
Shots
25

22 January 2016; 16:15	South Africa	1–12 (1–2, 0–6, 0–4)	New Zealand	Ice Dome, Mexico City; Attendance: 45

Game reference

Marcello Strydom
Aslam Khan
Goalies
Evan Froger
Referee:
(Canada) Michael Campbell
Linesmen:
(Mexico) David Campillo
(Italy) Simone Mischiatti

	0–1	06:58 – Vortanov (Leahy)
	0–2	12:32 – Hay
Ruthven (Thornton, Bremner) – 17:37	1–2
	1–3	20:31 – Carson-Pratt (Orr, Hay)
	1–4	29:54 – Carson-Pratt (Orr)
	1–5	31:29 – Scott (Vortanov)
	1–6	31:43 – Vortanov (Leahy, Scott)
	1–7	36:51 – Hay (Kennedy, Vortanov) (PP)
	1–8	39:37 – Orr (Carson-Pratt, Hay)
	1–9	45:14 – Vortanov (Scott)
	1–10	46:53 – M. Rawiri (J. Rawiri, Rooney)
	1–11	50:23 – Jonsson (Vortanov)
	1–12	57:28 – Scott (Jonsson, Vortanov)

6 min
Penalties
2 min
9
Shots
38

22 January 2016; 20:00	Mexico	1–4 (1–1, 0–0, 0–3)	Iceland	Ice Dome, Mexico City; Attendance: 1000

Game reference

Leonardo Chavez
Goalies
Nicolas Jouanne
Referee:
(United States) Jeremy Tufts
Linesmen:
(Canada) Maxime Chaput
(United States) James Scarpace

	0–1	03:10 – Johannesson (Arason, Induss)
Jo. Perez (Garcia) – 09:11	1–1
	1–2	47:30 – Olafsson (Johannsson, Induss)
	1–3	55:22 – Sigrunarson (Induss, Johannesson) (PP)
	1–4	57:54 – Arnason (Arason) (ENG)

10 min
Penalties
12 min
18
Shots
29

24 January 2016; 13:00	Turkey	2–6 (0–1, 1–0, 1–5)	Israel	Ice Dome, Mexico City; Attendance: 70

Game reference

Tolga Bozaci
Goalies
Maxim Gokhberg
Referee:
(United States) Jeremy Tufts
Linesmen:
(Mexico) Jafet Ramirez
(United States) James Scarpace

	0–1	17:21 – Kozev (Natalchenko, Halpert)
Bakal (H. Secer) (PP) – 30:30	1–1
	1–2	49:14 – Spektor (Natalchenko)
	1–3	52:34 – Spektor (R. Aharonovich, Kozev)
	1–4	53:45 – Revniaga (Kafri, Hoffman) (PP)
	1–5	55:12 – Revniaga
Avci (K. Salt, Takar) – 56:06	2–5
	2–6	57:33 – Avraham (Spektor) (PP)

28 min
Penalties
22 min
25
Shots
21

24 January 2016; 16:15	Iceland	5–6 (0–2, 4–2, 1–2)	New Zealand	Ice Dome, Mexico City; Attendance: 200

Game reference

Nicolas Jouanne
Goalies
Liam Henare
Referee:
(Slovakia) Miroslav Stefik
Linesmen:
(Germany) Jan-Christian Muller
(Netherlands) Stef Oosterling

	0–1	01:07 – Scott (Vortanov)
	0–2	15:41 – Vortanov (Louw, Henare)
Arnason (Atlason) – 20:45	1–2
Maack (Johannesson) – 21:56	2–2
	2–3	23:43 – Leahy (Hay, Carson-Pratt)
Sigrunarson (Olafsson, Johannsson) (PP) – 25:18	3–3
Kristinsson (Maack) (PP) – 33:57	4–3
	4–4	36:42 – Kennedy (Carson-Pratt) (PP)
	4–5	42:46 – Carson-Pratt (Hay, Orr) (PP)
Johannesson (Maack)	5–5
	5–6	58:12 – Carson-Pratt (Hay, Vortanov) (PP)

8 min
Penalties
14 min
25
Shots
23

24 January 2016; 20:00	Mexico	9–2 (4–0, 2–1, 3–1)	South Africa	Ice Dome, Mexico City; Attendance: 2000

Game reference

Sebastian de la Vega
Jaime Perez
Goalies
Marcello Strydom
Referee:
(Denmark) Jens Christian Gregersen
Linesmen:
(Canada) Maxime Chaput
(Italy) Simone Mischiatti

Benabib (Garcia) – 04:03	1–0
Alva (Ramos, Benabib) (PP) – 10:21	2–0
Rios – 14:07	3–0
Ramos (Benabib) – 15:40	4–0
Dunn (Garcia, Jo. Perez) (PP2) – 27:12	5–0
	5–1	32:20 – Bremner (Husselman, Thornton) (PP)
Jo. Perez (Garcia) (PP) – 36:58	6–1
	6–2	45:08 – Saaiman (Obery)
Jo. Perez (Garcia) (PP) – 52:49	7–2
Cosio (Jo. Perez) – 54:35	8–2
Najera (Berard) – 57:43	9–2

29 min
Penalties
28 min
30
Shots
10

== Statistics ==
=== Top 10 scorers ===
Pos	Player	Country	GP	G	A	Pts	+/-	PIM
1	Roey Aharonovich	Israel	6	7	11	18	+4	2
2	Ilya Spektor	Israel	6	10	6	16	+5	12
3	Mark Revniaga	Israel	6	9	4	13	+3	6
4	Oliver Hay	New Zealand	6	7	6	13	+8	8
5	Robin Vortanov	New Zealand	6	5	7	12	+7	4
6	Miroslav Vasilev	Bulgaria	6	1	10	11	+8	6
7	Veselin Dikov	Bulgaria	6	6	4	10	+9	6
8	Styrmir Maack	Iceland	6	3	7	10	+3	4
9	Bjarki Johannesson	Iceland	6	5	4	9	+3	6
10	Thomas Carson-Pratt	New Zealand	6	4	5	9	+3	6

=== Goaltending leaders ===
(minimum 40% team's total ice time)

Pos	Player	Country	MINS	GA	Sv%	GAA	SO
1	Dimitar Dimitrov	Bulgaria	319:08	11	93.45	2.07	0
2	Jaime Perez	Mexico	254:56	9	92.04	2.12	1
3	Liam Henare	New Zealand	298:05	15	90.38	3.02	0
4	Tolga Bozaci	Turkey	357:21	15	87.50	2.52	2
5	Maxim Gokhberg	Israel	300:39	18	85.25	3.59	0

== Awards ==
=== Best Players Selected by the Directorate ===
- Goaltender: (Mexico) Jaime Perez
- Defenceman: (Turkey) Fatih Faner
- Forward: (New Zealand) Oliver Hay
