= 2013 World Junior Ice Hockey Championships – Division III =

2013 IIHF U20 World Championship Division III

Tournament details
- Host country: Bulgaria
- City: Sofia
- Venue(s): 1 (in 1 host city)
- Dates: 14–20 January 2013
- Teams: 6

The 2013 World Junior Ice Hockey Championship Division III was an international ice hockey tournament organized by the International Ice Hockey Federation. It was played in Sofia, Bulgaria, between 14 and 20 January 2013. The Division III represents the sixth tier of the 2013 World Junior Ice Hockey Championships.

The UAE were to have made their first appearance, but forfeited all games for not fulfilling minimum registration requirements. Their games were still played, but did not count in the standings.

== Participating teams ==
Team	Qualification
Mexico	Placed 6th in Division II B last year and were relegated.
China	Placed 2nd in Division III last year.
New Zealand	Placed 3rd in Division III last year.
Bulgaria	Hosts; placed 4th in Division III last year.
Turkey	Placed 5th in Division III last year.
~~United Arab Emirates~~	~~First participation in World Championship.~~

== Match officials ==
Referees

- (Slovenia) Luka Kamšek
- (United Kingdom) Jonathan Liptrott
- (Austria) Christian Potocan
- (Spain) Alexei Roshchyn

Linesmen

- (South Korea) Youngjin Chae
- (Latvia) Viesturs Levalds
- (Austria) Manuel Nikolic
- (Iceland) Orri Sigmarsson
- (Bulgaria) Luchezar Stoyanov
- (Bulgaria) Tzvetko Tanev
- (Belgium) Chris van Grinsven

== Final standings ==
Pos	Team	Pld	W	OTW	OTL	L	GF	GA	GD	Pts	Promotion
1	China	5	5	0	0	0	32	6	+26	15	Promoted to the 2014 Division II B
2	Bulgaria (H)	5	4	0	0	1	19	14	+5	12	
3	New Zealand	5	3	0	0	2	13	12	+1	9	
4	Mexico	5	2	0	0	3	18	12	+6	6	
5	Turkey	5	1	0	0	4	15	28	−13	3	
–	~~United Arab Emirates~~ (Note: United Arab Emirates were disqualified and all their games were counted as 5-0 wins for their opponents. They played each team in an exhibition schedule, losing each game with a combined total of two goals for and sixty-eight goals against.) (D)	5	0	0	0	5	0	25	−25	0	Disqualified

Source: IIHF
(D) Disqualified; (H) Host

== Match results ==
All times are local (Eastern European Time – UTC+2).

14 January 2013; 13:00	China	7–3 (3–2, 4–0, 0–1)	Turkey	Winter Sports Palace, Sofia

Game reference

14 January 2013; 16:30	New Zealand	1–0 (1–0, 0–0, 0–0)	Mexico	Winter Sports Palace, Sofia

Game reference

14 January 2013; 20:00	United Arab Emirates	0–5 (forfeit); 0–16 (exhibition)	Bulgaria	Winter Sports Palace, Sofia

Game reference

15 January 2013; 13:00	China	4–1 (3–0, 0–1, 1–0)	New Zealand	Winter Sports Palace, Sofia

Game reference

15 January 2013; 16:30	Turkey	5–0 (forfeit); 11–0 (exhibition)	United Arab Emirates	Winter Sports Palace, Sofia

Game reference

15 January 2013; 20:00	Mexico	1–3 (0–0, 1–1, 0–2)	Bulgaria	Winter Sports Palace, Sofia

Game reference

17 January 2013; 13:00	Mexico	11–2 (3–1, 2–1, 6–0)	Turkey	Winter Sports Palace, Sofia

Game reference

17 January 2013; 16:30	China	5–0 (forfeit); 23–1 (exhibition)	United Arab Emirates	Winter Sports Palace, Sofia

Game reference

17 January 2013; 20:00	New Zealand	0–6 (0–0, 0–3, 0–3)	Bulgaria	Winter Sports Palace, Sofia

Game reference

18 January 2013; 13:00	United Arab Emirates	0–5 (forfeit); 0–6 (exhibition)	Mexico	Winter Sports Palace, Sofia

Game reference

18 January 2013; 16:30	Turkey	2–6 (1–2, 1–2, 0–2)	New Zealand	Winter Sports Palace, Sofia

Game reference

18 January 2013; 20:00	Bulgaria	1–10 (0–6, 1–2, 0–2)	China	Winter Sports Palace, Sofia

Game reference

20 January 2013; 13:00	New Zealand	5–0 (forfeit); 12–1 (exhibition)	United Arab Emirates	Winter Sports Palace, Sofia

Game reference

20 January 2013; 16:30	Bulgaria	4–3 (2–1, 1–1, 1–1)	Turkey	Winter Sports Palace, Sofia

Game reference

20 January 2013; 20:00	Mexico	1–6 (0–3, 1–2, 0–1)	China	Winter Sports Palace, Sofia

Game reference
