= New Zealand men's national junior ice hockey team =

New Zealand
- Nickname: Junior Ice Blacks
- Association: New Zealand Ice Hockey Federation
- General manager: Dave Fraser
- Head coach: Justin Daigle
- Assistants: Andrew Spiller
- Captain: Shaun Brown
- Most games: Joshua Hay (21)
- Top scorer: Joshua Hay (20)
- Most points: Joshua Hay (35)
- Team colors
- IIHF code: NZL

First international
- New Zealand 3 – 2 Turkey (Sofia, Bulgaria; January 5, 2004)

Biggest win
- New Zealand 20 – 1 Turkey (Belgrade, Serbia; January 18, 2008)

Biggest defeat
- Netherlands 19 – 0 New Zealand (Bucharest, Romania; December 13, 2005)

IIHF World U20 Championship
- Appearances: 20 (first in 2004)
- Best result: 33rd (2026)

International record (W–L–T)
- 35–41–1

The New Zealand men's national under 20 ice hockey team is the national under-20 ice hockey team of New Zealand. The team is controlled by the New Zealand Ice Hockey Federation, a member of the International Ice Hockey Federation.

== History ==
New Zealand played its first game in 2004 against Turkey during the Division III tournament of the 2004 IIHF World U20 Championship. New Zealand won the game 3–2. The following year New Zealand gained promotion to Division II after finishing second in the Division III tournament of the 2005 IIHF World U20 Championship. During the 2006 Division II Group A tournament New Zealand suffered their worst defeat in international competition, losing to the Netherlands men's national junior ice hockey team 0–19. The team continued to compete at the World Championships up until 2008 where they gained promotion after winning the Division III tournament. During the tournament they also achieved their largest ever victory in international competition when they defeated Turkey 20–1. In 2009 New Zealand did not send a team to compete in the 2009 IIHF World U20 Championship but returned the following year to compete in the 2010 Division III tournament. In 2012 they finished third in the Division III tournament held in Dunedin, New Zealand.

Chris Eaden currently holds the team record for most points with 28 all of which he scored during the 2008 IIHF World U20 Championship, his only appearance for the New Zealand under-20 team.

== International competitions ==
- 2004 – 6th in Division III (40th overall)
- 2005 – 2nd in Division III (36th overall)
- 2006 – 6th in Division II Group A (34th overall)
- 2007 – 3rd in Division III (37th overall)
- 2008 – 1st in Division III (35th overall)
- 2009 – Forfeited
- 2010 – 4th in Division III (38th overall)
- 2011 – 5th in Division III (39th overall)
- 2012 – 3rd in Division III (37th overall)
- 2013 – 3rd in Division III (37th overall)
- 2014 – 2nd in Division III (36th overall)
- 2015 – 2nd in Division III (36th overall)
- 2016 – 3rd in Division III (37th overall)
- 2017 – 4th in Division III (38th overall)
- 2018 – 6th in Division III (40th overall)
- 2019 – 8th in Division III (42nd overall)
- 2020 – 6th in Division III (40th overall)
- 2021 – Did not participate
- 2022 – Did not participate
- 2023 – 5th in Division III (39th overall)
- 2024 – 2nd in Division IIIA (36th overall)
- 2025 – 1st in Division IIIA (35th overall)
- 2026 – 5th in Division IIB (33rd overall)
