= China men's national junior ice hockey team =

Youth ice hockey team representing China

China
- Association: Chinese Ice Hockey Association
- Head coach: (China) Pan Yuqiang
- Assistants: (China) Guan Xiaobo
- Captain: Xia Tianxiang
- Most games: Ge Tian (20); Liu Longtan (20)
- Most points: Zhang Cheng (20)
- IIHF code: CHN

First international
- France 11–4 China (Gap, France; 21 March 1986)

Biggest win
- China 14–0 Turkey (Dunedin, New Zealand; 19 January 2012)

Biggest defeat
- Hungary 20–0 China (Miercurea-Ciuc, Romania; 13 December 2010); Poland 20–0 China (Miercurea-Ciuc, Romania; 16 December 2010)

IIHF World U20 Championship
- Appearances: 22 (first in 1986)
- Best result: 20th (1986)

International record (W–L–T)
- 26–36–0

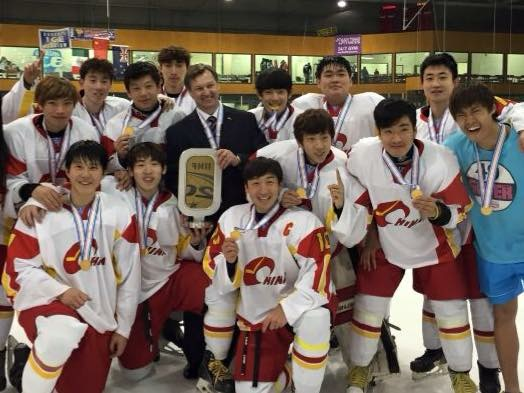
The Chinese junior team after winning the 2015 World Junior Division III tournament.

The Chinese men's national under-20 ice hockey team is the national under-20 ice hockey team in China. The team represents China at the International Ice Hockey Federation's World Junior Hockey Championship Division III.

== Results ==
- 1986 – 20th overall (4th in Pool C)
- 1989–2003 – Did not participate
- 2004 – 36th overall (2nd in Division III)
- 2005 – 28th overall (4th in Division IIA)
- 2006 – 34th overall (6th in Division IIB)
- 2007 – 35th overall (1st in Division III)
- 2008 – 34th overall (6th in Division IIB)
- 2009 – 34th overall (6th in Division IIB)
- 2010 – 33rd overall (5th in Division IIA)
- 2011 – 34th overall (6th in Division IIB)
- 2012 – 36th overall (2nd in Division III)
- 2013 – 35th overall (1st in Division III)
- 2014 – 34th overall (6th in Division IIB)
- 2015 – 35th overall (1st in Division III)
- 2016 – 34th overall (6th in Division IIB)
- 2017 – 36th overall (2nd in Division III)
- 2018 – 36th overall (2nd in Division III)
- 2019 – 35th overall (1st in Division III)
- 2020 – 31st overall (3rd in Division IIB)
- 2021 – Cancelled
- 2022 – withdrew (6th in Division IIB)
- 2023 – 29th overall (1st in Division IIB)
- 2024 – 26th overall (4th in Division IIA)
- 2025 – 27th overall (5th in Division IIA)
- 2026 – 27th overall (5th in Division IIA)
