= 2008 World Junior Ice Hockey Championships – Division III =

2008 IIHF U20 World Championship Division III
Tournament details
- Host country: Serbia
- City: Belgrade
- Venue(s): 1 (in 1 host city)
- Dates: 16–24 January 2008
- Teams: 7

The 2008 World Junior Ice Hockey Championship Division III was an international ice hockey tournament organized by the International Ice Hockey Federation, the fourth level of the 2008 World Junior Ice Hockey Championships. It was played from 16 to 24 January 2008 in Belgrade, Serbia.

== Venue ==
Division III Venue
Belgrade
Pionir Ice Hall
Capacity: 2,000

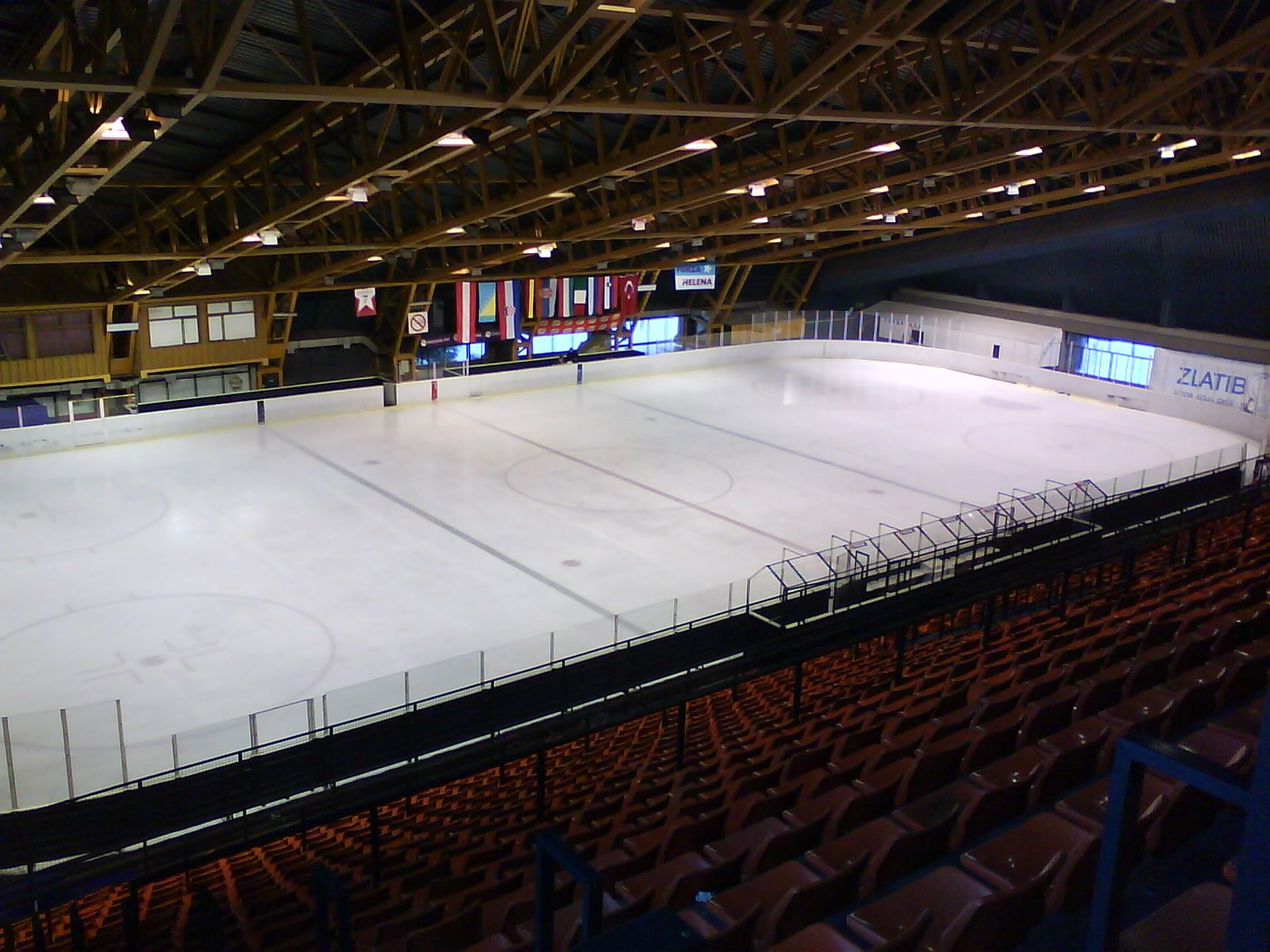

== Participating teams ==
Team	Qualification
Australia	Placed 6th in Division II Group A last year and were relegated.
Serbia	Hosts; placed 6th in Division II Group B last year and were relegated.
New Zealand	Placed 3rd in Division III last year.
Armenia	Placed 4th in Division III last year.
Turkey	Placed 5th in Division III last year.
Bulgaria	Placed 6th in Division III last year.
South Africa	Last participated in 2005.

== Final standings ==
Pos	Team	Pld	W	OTW	OTL	L	GF	GA	GD	Pts	Promotion
1	New Zealand	6	6	0	0	0	66	15	+51	18	Promoted to the 2009 Division II
2	Serbia (H)	6	5	0	0	1	55	7	+48	15	Promoted to the 2009 Division II
3	Armenia	6	4	0	0	2	47	23	+24	12	
4	Australia	6	3	0	0	3	44	23	+21	9	
5	South Africa	6	2	0	0	4	26	52	−26	6	
6	Turkey	6	1	0	0	5	18	62	−44	3	
7	Bulgaria	6	0	0	0	6	10	84	−74	0	

Source: IIHF
(H) Host

== Match results ==
All times are local (Central European Time – UTC+1).

16 January 2008; 14:00	Australia	5–3 (1–1, 1–0, 3–2)	Turkey	Pionir Ice Hall, Belgrade

Game reference

16 January 2008; 17:30	Armenia	13–1 (4–0, 4–0, 5–1)	South Africa	Pionir Ice Hall, Belgrade

Game reference

16 January 2008; 21:00	Serbia	16–0 (6–0, 5–0, 5–0)	Bulgaria	Pionir Ice Hall, Belgrade

Game reference

17 January 2008; 14:00	New Zealand	19–1 (4–0, 8–0, 7–1)	Bulgaria	Pionir Ice Hall, Belgrade

Game reference

17 January 2008; 17:30	Australia	16–2 (7–0, 5–1, 4–1)	South Africa	Pionir Ice Hall, Belgrade

Game reference

17 January 2008; 21:00	Armenia	13–1 (4–0, 4–1, 5–0)	Turkey	Pionir Ice Hall, Belgrade

Game reference

18 January 2008; 14:00	Bulgaria	0–16 (0–5, 0–7, 0–4)	Australia	Pionir Ice Hall, Belgrade

Game reference

18 January 2008; 17:30	Turkey	1–20 (0–7, 1–7, 0–6)	New Zealand	Pionir Ice Hall, Belgrade

Game reference

18 January 2008; 21:00	Serbia	10–1 (3–1, 2–0, 5–0)	South Africa	Pionir Ice Hall, Belgrade

Game reference

20 January 2008; 14:00	Turkey	9–4 (4–1, 3–3, 2–0)	Bulgaria	Pionir Ice Hall, Belgrade

Game reference

20 January 2008; 17:30	New Zealand	8–4 (4–2, 2–1, 2–1)	Armenia	Pionir Ice Hall, Belgrade

Game reference

20 January 2008; 14:00	Serbia	5–0 (3–0, 2–0, 0–0)	Australia	Pionir Ice Hall, Belgrade

Game reference

21 January 2008; 14:00	Bulgaria	3–13 (1–4, 2–4, 0–5)	South Africa	Pionir Ice Hall, Belgrade

Game reference

21 January 2008; 17:30	Australia	2–7 (2–2, 0–1, 0–4)	New Zealand	Pionir Ice Hall, Belgrade

Game reference

21 January 2008; 21:00	Serbia	6–0 (1–0, 1–0, 4–0)	Armenia	Pionir Ice Hall, Belgrade

Game reference

23 January 2008; 14:00	South Africa	6–3 (1–0, 3–1, 2–2)	Turkey	Pionir Ice Hall, Belgrade

Game reference

23 January 2008; 17:30	Armenia	6–5 (2–3, 3–0, 1–2)	Australia	Pionir Ice Hall, Belgrade

Game reference

23 January 2008; 21:00	New Zealand	5–4 (1–1, 2–1, 2–2)	Serbia	Pionir Ice Hall, Belgrade

Game reference

24 January 2008; 14:00	South Africa	3–7 (0–3, 2–3, 1–1)	New Zealand	Pionir Ice Hall, Belgrade

Game reference

24 January 2008; 17:30	Bulgaria	2–11 (1–4, 0–3, 1–4)	Armenia	Pionir Ice Hall, Belgrade

Game reference

24 January 2008; 21:00	Turkey	1–14 (0–5, 0–5, 1–4)	Serbia	Pionir Ice Hall, Belgrade

Game reference

== See also ==
- 2008 World Junior Ice Hockey Championships
- 2008 World Junior Ice Hockey Championships – Division I
- 2008 World Junior Ice Hockey Championships – Division II
