= 2023 World Junior Ice Hockey Championships – Division II =

International ice hockey tournament

2023 IIHF U20 World Championship Division II
Tournament details
- Host countries: Lithuania; Iceland
- Venues: 2 (in 2 host cities)
- Dates: 11–17 December 2022; 16–22 January 2023
- Teams: 12

The 2023 World Junior Ice Hockey Championship Division II was a pair of international ice hockey tournaments organized by the International Ice Hockey Federation. It consisted of two tiered groups of six teams each: the fourth-tier Division II A and the fifth-tier Division II B. For each tier's tournament, the first-placed team was promoted to a higher division, while the last-placed team was relegated to a lower division.

To be eligible as a junior player in these tournaments, a player cannot be born earlier than 2003.

== Division II A ==
2023 IIHF U20 World Championship Division II A

Tournament details
- Host country: Lithuania
- City: Kaunas
- Venue: 1 (in 1 host city)
- Dates: 11–17 December 2022
- Teams: 6

Tournament statistics
- Games played: 15
- Goals scored: 107 (7.13 per game)
- Attendance: 5,905 (394 per game)
- Scoring leader: (United Kingdom) Jack Hopkins (11 points)

Official website
- www.iihf.com

The Division II A tournament was played in Kaunas, Lithuania, from 11 to 17 December 2022.

=== Participating teams ===
Team	Qualification
Great Britain	placed 3rd in Division II A last year
Spain	placed 4th in Division II A last year
Lithuania	hosts; placed 5th in Division II A last year
Romania	placed 6th in Division II A last year
Croatia	placed 1st in Division II B last year and were promoted
Netherlands	placed 2nd in Division II B last year and were promoted

=== Match officials ===
Four referees and seven linesmen were selected for the tournament.

Referees

- (Hungary) Gergely Korbuly
- (Poland) Krzysztof Kozłowski
- (Latvia) Māris Locāns
- (Ukraine) Anton Peretyatko

Linesmen

- (Japan) Go Hashimoto
- (Denmark) Alexander Kaptain
- (Ukraine) Sergii Kharaberyush
- (Kazakhstan) Vladislav Mashenkin
- (Lithuania) Aleksej Sascenkov
- (France) Jason Thorrignac
- (Estonia) Juri Timofejev

=== Final standings ===
Pos	Team	Pld	W	OTW	OTL	L	GF	GA	GD	Pts	Promotion or relegation
1	Croatia	5	3	1	1	0	25	17	+8	12 (Note: Great Britain 4–7 Croatia)	Promoted to the 2024 Division I B
2	Great Britain	5	4	0	0	1	27	11	+16	12	
3	Lithuania (H)	5	3	0	1	1	15	9	+6	10	
4	Spain	5	2	0	0	3	18	20	−2	6	
5	Netherlands	5	1	1	0	3	11	21	−10	5	
6	Romania	5	0	0	0	5	11	29	−18	0	Relegated to the 2024 Division II B

Source: IIHF
Rules for classification: 1) points; 2) head-to-head points; 3) head-to-head goal difference; 4) head-to-head number of goals scored; 5) result against closest best-ranked team outside tied teams; 6) result against second-best-ranked team outside tied teams; 7) seeding before tournament.
(H) Host

=== Match results ===
All times are local (Eastern European Time – UTC+2).

11 December 2022; 12:30	Netherlands	3–2 OT (1–1, 0–1, 1–0) (OT: 1–0)	Croatia	Kaunas Ice Palace, Kaunas; Attendance: 112

Game reference
Jowin Ansems	Goalies	Teo Janjatović-Lončar	Referee: (Ukraine) Anton Peretyatko; Linesmen: (Japan) Go Hashimoto (Estonia) Juri Timofejev
28	Shots	47	Referee: (Ukraine) Anton Peretyatko; Linesmen: (Japan) Go Hashimoto (Estonia) Juri Timofejev

11 December 2022; 16:00	Lithuania	3–4 (2–1, 1–2, 0–1)	Great Britain	Kaunas Ice Palace, Kaunas; Attendance: 689

Game reference
Julius Andrekus	Goalies	Benjamin Norton	Referee: (Latvia) Māris Locāns; Linesmen: (Ukraine) Sergii Kharaberyush (France) Jason Thorrignac
20	Shots	32	Referee: (Latvia) Māris Locāns; Linesmen: (Ukraine) Sergii Kharaberyush (France) Jason Thorrignac

11 December 2022; 19:30	Spain	6–2 (1–1, 2–0, 3–1)	Romania	Kaunas Ice Palace, Kaunas; Attendance: 238

Game reference
Julio Rapun	Goalies	Nandor Biro	Referee: (Hungary) Gergely Korbuly; Linesmen: (Kazakhstan) Vladislav Mashenkin (Lithuania) Aleksej Sascenkov
34	Shots	18	Referee: (Hungary) Gergely Korbuly; Linesmen: (Kazakhstan) Vladislav Mashenkin (Lithuania) Aleksej Sascenkov

13 December 2022; 12:30	Romania	4–5 (1–2, 1–0, 2–3)	Netherlands	Kaunas Ice Palace, Kaunas; Attendance: 82

Game reference
Nandor Biro	Goalies	Jowin Ansems	Referee: (Poland) Krzysztof Kozłowski; Linesmen: (Denmark) Alexander Kaptain (Ukraine) Sergii Kharaberyush
47	Shots	28	Referee: (Poland) Krzysztof Kozłowski; Linesmen: (Denmark) Alexander Kaptain (Ukraine) Sergii Kharaberyush

13 December 2022; 16:00	Great Britain	4–7 (1–4, 0–2, 3–1)	Croatia	Kaunas Ice Palace, Kaunas; Attendance: 392

Game reference
Daniel Crowe; Benjamin Norton	Goalies	Teo Janjatović-Lončar	Referee: (Hungary) Gergely Korbuly; Linesmen: (Japan) Go Hashimoto (Lithuania) Aleksej Sascenkov
31	Shots	27	Referee: (Hungary) Gergely Korbuly; Linesmen: (Japan) Go Hashimoto (Lithuania) Aleksej Sascenkov

13 December 2022; 19:30	Spain	1–4 (0–1, 0–2, 1–1)	Lithuania	Kaunas Ice Palace, Kaunas; Attendance: 532

Game reference
Julio Rapun	Goalies	Kazimieras Jukna	Referee: (Ukraine) Anton Peretyatko; Linesmen: (Kazakhstan) Vladislav Mashenkin (Estonia) Juri Timofejev
26	Shots	35	Referee: (Ukraine) Anton Peretyatko; Linesmen: (Kazakhstan) Vladislav Mashenkin (Estonia) Juri Timofejev

14 December 2022; 12:30	Great Britain	9–0 (4–0, 3–0, 2–0)	Romania	Kaunas Ice Palace, Kaunas; Attendance: 361

Game reference
Benjamin Norton	Goalies	Márton Buda; Nandor Biro	Referee: (Poland) Krzysztof Kozłowski; Linesmen: (Ukraine) Sergii Kharaberyush (Kazakhstan) Vladislav Mashenkin
39	Shots	21	Referee: (Poland) Krzysztof Kozłowski; Linesmen: (Ukraine) Sergii Kharaberyush (Kazakhstan) Vladislav Mashenkin

14 December 2022; 16:00	Spain	5–2 (2–1, 2–1, 1–0)	Netherlands	Kaunas Ice Palace, Kaunas

Game reference
Julio Rapun	Goalies	Jowin Ansems
31	Shots	32

14 December 2022; 19:30	Lithuania	1–2 GWS (1–0, 0–0, 0–1) (OT: 0–0) (SO: 1–3)	Croatia	Kaunas Ice Palace, Kaunas

Game reference
Kazimieras Jukna	Goalies	Teo Janjatović-Lončar
24	Shots	31

16 December 2022; 12:30	Croatia	9–5 (3–2, 2–1, 4–2)	Spain	Kaunas Ice Palace, Kaunas

Game reference
29	Shots	37

16 December 2022; 16:00	Netherlands	0–7 (0–1, 0–4, 0–2)	Great Britain	Kaunas Ice Palace, Kaunas

Game reference
11	Shots	47

16 December 2022; 19:30	Romania	1–4 (0–1, 1–1, 0–2)	Lithuania	Kaunas Ice Palace, Kaunas

Game reference
21	Shots	34

17 December 2022; 12:30	Great Britain	3–1 (1–1, 1–0, 1–0)	Spain	Kaunas Ice Palace, Kaunas

Game reference
16	Shots	28

17 December 2022; 16:00	Lithuania	3–1 (1–1, 1–0, 1–0)	Netherlands	Kaunas Ice Palace, Kaunas

Game reference
35	Shots	18

17 December 2022; 19:30	Croatia	5–4 (2–0, 2–3, 1–1)	Romania	Kaunas Ice Palace, Kaunas

Game reference
29	Shots	33

=== Statistics ===
==== Top 10 scorers ====
Pos	Player	Country	GP	G	A	Pts	+/–	PIM
1	Jack Hopkis	Great Britain	5	5	6	11	+8	6
2	Marijus Dumčius	Lithuania	5	4	7	11	+8	27
3	Bruno Idžan	Croatia	5	6	4	10	+7	14
4	Mackenzie Stewart	Great Britain	5	4	5	9	+7	14
5	Jaime de Bonilla	Spain	5	4	4	8	+2	2
5	Vito Idžan	Croatia	5	4	4	8	+8	4
5	Jonathan McBean	Great Britain	5	4	4	8	+7	4
8	Bayley Harewood	Great Britain	5	3	5	8	+5	10
9	Artur Seniut	Lithuania	5	3	4	7	+7	6
10	Liam Steele	Great Britain	5	3	3	6	+7	4

GP = Games played; G = Goals; A = Assists; Pts = Points; +/− = P Plus–minus; PIM = Penalties In Minutes
Source: IIHF

==== Goaltending leaders ====
(minimum 40% team's total ice time)

Pos	Player	Country	TOI	GA	Sv%	GAA	SO
1	Kazimieras Jukna	Lithuania	245:00	4	95.79	0.98	0
2	Benjamin Norton	Great Britain	237:44	4	95.45	0.90	2
3	Jowin Ansems	Netherlands	242:22	18	89.53	4.46	0
4	Teo Janjatović-Lončar	Croatia	307:22	17	88.89	3.32	0
5	Julio Rapun	Spain	226:13	14	86.54	3.71	0

TOI = Time on ice (minutes:seconds); GA = Goals against; GAA = Goals against average; Sv% = Save percentage; SO = Shutouts
Source: IIHF

==== Best Players Selected by the Directorate ====
- Goaltender: (Lithuania) Kazimieras Jukna
- Defenceman: (Spain) Jaime de Bonilla
- Forward: (Croatia) Bruno Idžan

Source: IIHF

== Division II B ==
2023 IIHF U20 World Championship Division II B

Tournament details
- Host country: Iceland
- City: Reykjavík
- Venue: 1 (in 1 host city)
- Dates: 16–22 January 2023
- Teams: 6

Tournament statistics
- Games played: 15
- Goals scored: 123 (8.2 per game)
- Attendance: 1,793 (120 per game)
- Scoring leader: (Belgium) Lowie Vreys (12 points)

Official website
- www.iihf.com

The Division II B tournament was played in Reykjavík, Iceland, from 16 to 22 January 2023.

=== Participating teams ===
Team	Qualification
Serbia	placed 3rd in Division II B last year
Belgium	placed 4th in Division II B last year
Iceland	hosts; placed 5th in Division II B last year
Chinese Taipei	placed 1st in Division III last year and were promoted
Mexico	placed 2nd in Division III last year and were promoted
China	placed 3rd in 2020 Division II B; didn't play last year

=== Final standings ===
Pos	Team	Pld	W	OTW	OTL	L	GF	GA	GD	Pts	Promotion or relegation
1	China	5	4	1	0	0	29	9	+20	14	Promoted to the 2024 Division II A
2	Belgium	5	4	0	1	0	25	14	+11	13	
3	Serbia	5	3	0	0	2	27	18	+9	9	
4	Iceland (H)	5	2	0	0	3	18	21	−3	6	
5	Chinese Taipei	5	1	0	0	4	17	29	−12	3	
6	Mexico	5	0	0	0	5	7	32	−25	0	Relegated to the 2024 Division III

Source: IIHF
Rules for classification: 1) points; 2) head-to-head points; 3) head-to-head goal difference; 4) head-to-head number of goals scored; 5) result against closest best-ranked team outside tied teams; 6) result against second-best-ranked team outside tied teams; 7) seeding before tournament.
(H) Host

=== Match results ===
All times are local (Time in Iceland – UTC±0).

16 January 2023; 13:00	Mexico	3–8 (1–3, 1–2, 1–3)	Chinese Taipei	Laugardalur Arena, Reykjavík; Attendance: 50

Game reference

Santiago Cucuraqui
Fernando Garcia
Goalies
Hao-Hsuan Kao
Tzu-Sen Chao
Referee:
(United Kingdom) David Good
Linesmen:
(Iceland) Sindri Gunnarsson
(Netherlands) Jeroen Klijberg

Argandonna (Cuellar, Rullan) – 09:01	1–0
	1–1	11:29 – Chou (Wen) (PP)
	1–2	17:19 – Hsu Y. (Wen) (PP)
	1–3	19:41 – Peng (Hsu Y.)
	1–4	22:39 – Chou (Hsu Y.)
L. Valencia – 33:43	2–4
	2–5	35:50 – Peng (Wen)
	2–6	43:41 – Chou (Hsu Y., Wen)
	2–7	11:29 – Wang Y.H. (Wen, Cheng)
Quinzanos – 50:05	3–7
	3–8	59:43 – Wen (Li)

14 min
Penalties
10 min
35
Shots
35

16 January 2023; 16:30	Belgium	3–4 OT (1–1, 1–1, 1–1) (OT: 0-1)	China	Laugardalur Arena, Reykjavík; Attendance: 45

Game reference
Stijn Raeymaekers	Goalies	Boyan Tian

16 January 2023; 20:00	Iceland	1–7 (0–3, 0–3, 1–1)	Serbia	Laugardalur Arena, Reykjavík; Attendance: 213

Game reference
Johann Ragnarsson; Helgi Ivarsson	Goalies	Neil Nebojsa Beaton

17 January 2023; 13:00	China	4–0 (1–0, 2–0, 1–0)	Mexico	Laugardalur Arena, Reykjavík; Attendance: 35

Game reference
Chen Shifen	Goalies	Fernando Garcia

17 January 2023; 16:30	Serbia	7–1 (2–0, 2–1, 3–0)	Chinese Taipei	Laugardalur Arena, Reykjavík; Attendance: 25

Game reference

Neil Nebojsa Beaton
Goalies

Referee:
(Romania) Cristian Filip
Linesmen:
(Netherlands) Jeroen Klijberg
(Iceland) Saemundur Leifsson

Kravljanac (Djordjevic) (SH) – 02:12	1–0
Dinić (Ivanović) (PP) – 12:30	2–0
	2–1	29:59 – Lin J. (Chou, Wang Y.H.)
Viković – 31:08	3–1
Viković (M. Nikolić, Dinić) – 33:59	4–1
Dinić (Savić, Viković) – 41:38	5–1
Kravljanac (Dinić) – 52:02	6–1
Dinić (Perceric) – 58:56	7–1

10 min
Penalties
12 min
56
Shots
27

17 January 2023; 20:00	Belgium	5–3 (0–1, 2–1, 3–1)	Iceland	Laugardalur Arena, Reykjavík; Attendance: 153

Game reference
Stijn Raeymaeker	Goalies	Johann Ragnarsson

19 January 2023; 13:00	Serbia	2–8 (1–2, 0–4, 1–2)	China	Laugardalur Arena, Reykjavík; Attendance: 32

Game reference

19 January 2023; 16:30	Belgium	5–2 (3–0, 0–2, 2–0)	Mexico	Laugardalur Arena, Reykjavík; Attendance: 40

Game reference

19 January 2023; 20:00	Iceland	5–4 (1–1, 1–1, 3–2)	Chinese Taipei	Laugardalur Arena, Reykjavík; Attendance: 205

Game reference

Johann Ragnarsson
Goalies
Chen Tai-Yu
Kao Hao-Hsuan
Referee:
(Croatia) Filip Metzinger
Linesmen:
(Spain) Luis Estirado Revuelta
(Romania) Andries Gheorghies

Hlynsson (Magnusson) (PP) – 10:47	1–0
	1–1	16:27 – Fan (Wang Y.A.)
	1–2	37:24 – Wen (Peng, Lin Y.K.) (PP)
Arngrimsson (Blondal, Jonsson) – 38:55	2–2
	2–3	43:59 – Lo (Wang Y.H.
Arngrimsson (Thorsteinsson, Jonsson) (PP) – 46:08	3–3
Thorsteinsson (Arngrimsson) (PP) – 47:17	4–3
	4–4	51:31 – Lin (Lo, Fan)
Magnusson (Hlynsson) (PP) – 54:21	5–4

6 min
Penalties
41 min
41
Shots
35

20 January 2023; 13:00	Mexico	2–8 (0–3, 1–2, 1–3)	Serbia	Laugardalur Arena, Reykjavík; Attendance: 28

Game reference
8 min	Penalties	14 min
29	Shots	52

20 January 2023; 16:30	Chinese Taipei	2–6 (0–4, 0–0, 2–2)	Belgium	Laugardalur Arena, Reykjavík; Attendance: 30

Game reference

Kao Hao-Hsuan
Goalies
Stijm Raeymaekers
Referee:
(Croatia) Filip Metzinger
Linesmen:
(Romania) Andries Gheorghies
(Iceland) Sindri Gunnarsson

	0–1	01:01 – Cuylen (T. Vreys)
	0–2	01:51 – Vaerewyck (Vanmontfort, Raeymaekers)
	0–3	09:25 – Cuylen (Gentry)
	0–4	19:45 – L. Vreys (T. Vreys, van Gorp)
	0–5	55:07 – Vanmontfort (Palmaerts)
Peng (Lin Y.K., Lin Y.C.) (PP) – 58:08	1–5
Peng (Lin Y.K.) (PP) – 58:42	2–5
	2–6	59:33 – Vaerewyck

8 min
Penalties
16 min
33
Shots
40

20 January 2023; 20:00	China	5–2 (2–0, 2–1, 1–1)	Iceland	Laugardalur Arena, Reykjavík; Attendance: 264

Game reference
12 min	Penalties	8 min
44	Shots	35

22 January 2023; 11:00	China	8–2 (2–0, 4–0, 2–2)	Chinese Taipei	Laugardalur Arena, Reykjavík; Attendance: 32

Game reference

Chen Shifen
Goalies
Chen Tai-Yu
Referee:
(United Kingdom) David Good
Linesmen:
(Iceland) Sindri Gunnarsson
(Iceland) Saemundur Leifsson

Wei (Hu) – 07:07	1–0
Liu Z. (Hu) – 09:55	2–0
Hu – 23:01	3–0
Li M. (Lyu, Chen K.L.) – 23:47	4–0
Lyu (Li M.) – 35:47	5–0
Li Z.C. (Hu) – 37:44	6–0
	6–1	40:45 – Lin Y.C.
Ma (Liu C.Y., Zhang T.Y. – 43:32	7–1
Wei –48:04	8–1
	8–2	54:16 – Fan (Peng) (PP)

8 min
Penalties
4 min
42
Shots
38

22 January 2023; 14:30	Serbia	3–6 (2–1, 1–2, 0–3)	Belgium	Laugardalur Arena, Reykjavík; Attendance: 62

Game reference
12 min	Penalties	8 min
56	Shots	32

22 January 2023; 18:00	Iceland	7–0 (3–0, 3–0, 1–0)	Mexico	Laugardalur Arena, Reykjavík; Attendance: 579

Game reference
35 min	Penalties	16 min
37	Shots	36

=== Statistics ===
==== Top 10 scorers ====
Pos	Player	Country	GP	G	A	Pts	+/–	PIM
1	Lowie Vreys	Belgium	5	5	7	12	+4	6
2	Tijs Vreys	Belgium	5	4	8	12	+3	2
3	Matija Dinić	Serbia	5	4	7	11	+6	2
3	Hakon Magnusson	Iceland	5	4	7	11	+2	0
5	Vuk Kravljanac	Serbia	5	4	6	10	+2	2
6	Li Ming-shenhao	China	5	5	4	9	+12	2
7	Chen Kailin	China	5	4	5	9	+11	2
8	Lyu Zhiyi	China	5	3	5	8	+12	0
9	Rik Cuylen	Belgium	5	5	2	7	+3	4
9	Slavko Vidovic	Serbia	5	5	2	7	+5	2

GP = Games played; G = Goals; A = Assists; Pts = Points; +/− = P Plus–minus; PIM = Penalties In Minutes
Source: IIHF

==== Goaltending leaders ====
(minimum 40% team's total ice time)

Pos	Player	Country	TOI	GA	Sv%	GAA	SO
1	Chen Shifeng	China	180:00	4	95.92	1.33	1
2	Helgi Ivarsson	Iceland	140:00	6	93.26	2.57	1
3	Tian Boyan	China	124:27	5	92.65	2.41	0
4	Stijn Raeymaekers	Belgium	304:27	14	92.13	2.76	0
5	Neal Beaton	Serbia	201:10	8	91.58	2.39	0

TOI = Time on ice (minutes:seconds); GA = Goals against; GAA = Goals against average; Sv% = Save percentage; SO = Shutouts
Source: IIHF

==== Best Players Selected by the Directorate ====
- Goaltender: (China) Chen Shifeng
- Defenceman: (Belgium) Lowie Vreys
- Forward: (Serbia) Matija Dinić

Source: IIHF
