= 2014 World Junior Ice Hockey Championships – Division III =

2014 IIHF U20 World Championship Division III

Tournament details
- Host country: Turkey
- City: İzmir
- Venue(s): 1 (in 1 host city)
- Dates: 12–18 January 2014
- Teams: 6

The 2014 World Junior Ice Hockey Championship Division III was an international ice hockey tournament organized by the International Ice Hockey Federation. It was played in İzmir, Turkey, from 12 to 18 January 2014. Division III represents the sixth tier of the World Junior Ice Hockey Championships.

== Participating teams ==
Team	Qualification
Belgium	finished 6th in Division II B last year and were relegated
Bulgaria	finished 2nd in Division III last year
New Zealand	finished 3rd in Division III last year
Mexico	finished 4th in Division III last year
Turkey	hosts; finished 5th in Division III last year
South Africa	first participation since 2008

== Final standings ==
Pos	Team	Pld	W	OTW	OTL	L	GF	GA	GD	Pts	Promotion
1	Belgium	5	5	0	0	0	37	3	+34	15	Promoted to the 2015 Division II B
2	New Zealand	5	4	0	0	1	29	6	+23	12	
3	Mexico	5	2	1	0	2	16	11	+5	8	
4	Turkey (H)	5	2	0	1	2	10	24	−14	7	
5	South Africa	5	0	1	0	4	7	26	−19	2	
6	Bulgaria	5	0	0	1	4	4	33	−29	1	

Source: IIHF
(H) Host

== Match results ==
All times are local (Eastern European Time – UTC+2).

12 January 2014; 13:00	Mexico	0–4 (0–2, 0–1, 0–1)	Belgium	Bornova Ice Sports Hall, İzmir; Attendance: 125

Game reference

12 January 2014; 16:30	South Africa	0–6 (0–0, 0–3, 0–3)	New Zealand	Bornova Ice Sports Hall, İzmir; Attendance: 131

Game reference

12 January 2014; 20:00	Bulgaria	2–3 (1–0, 0–2, 1–1)	Turkey	Bornova Ice Sports Hall, İzmir; Attendance: 575

Game reference

13 January 2014; 13:00	Belgium	4–1 (2–1, 1–0, 1–0)	New Zealand	Bornova Ice Sports Hall, İzmir; Attendance: 52

Game reference

13 January 2014; 16:30	Bulgaria	0–6 (0–0, 0–2, 0–4)	Mexico	Bornova Ice Sports Hall, İzmir; Attendance: 72

Game reference

13 January 2014; 20:00	Turkey	4–1 (3–1, 1–0, 0–0)	South Africa	Bornova Ice Sports Hall, İzmir; Attendance: 376

Game reference

15 January 2014; 13:00	Bulgaria	2–3 OT (1–1, 1–0, 0–1) (0–1)	South Africa	Bornova Ice Sports Hall, İzmir; Attendance: 66

Game reference

15 January 2014; 16:30	Mexico	0–5 (0–0, 0–3, 0–2)	New Zealand	Bornova Ice Sports Hall, İzmir; Attendance: 83

Game reference

15 January 2014; 20:00	Belgium	9–0 (3–0, 1–0, 5–0)	Turkey	Bornova Ice Sports Hall, İzmir; Attendance: 660

Game reference

16 January 2014; 13:00	New Zealand	7–0 (3–0, 2–0, 2–0)	Bulgaria	Bornova Ice Sports Hall, İzmir; Attendance: 69

Game reference

16 January 2014; 16:30	South Africa	2–6 (1–3, 0–2, 1–1)	Belgium	Bornova Ice Sports Hall, İzmir; Attendance: 84

Game reference

16 January 2014; 20:00	Turkey	1–2 GWS (1–0, 0–0, 0–1) (0–0, 0–1)	Mexico	Bornova Ice Sports Hall, İzmir; Attendance: 783

Game reference

18 January 2014; 13:00	Mexico	8–1 (1–1, 5–0, 2–0)	South Africa	Bornova Ice Sports Hall, İzmir; Attendance: 72

Game reference

18 January 2014; 16:30	New Zealand	10–2 (2–1, 5–1, 3–0)	Turkey	Bornova Ice Sports Hall, İzmir; Attendance: 466

Game reference

18 January 2014; 20:00	Belgium	14–0 (5–0, 3–0, 6–0)	Bulgaria	Bornova Ice Sports Hall, İzmir; Attendance: 172

Game reference
