= 2012 World Junior Ice Hockey Championships – Division III =

2012 IIHF U20 World Championship Division III

Tournament details
- Host country: New Zealand
- City: Dunedin
- Venue: 1 (in 1 host city)
- Dates: 17–22 January 2012
- Teams: 5

The 2012 World Junior Ice Hockey Championship Division III was an international ice hockey tournament organized by the International Ice Hockey Federation. It was played in Dunedin, New Zealand, between 17 and 22 January 2012. The Division III represents the sixth tier of the 2012 World Junior Ice Hockey Championships.

This year, only the first-placed team advanced to Division II B for 2013, previously, the top two teams gained promotion to Division II. Although originally scheduled to participate, North Korea withdrew from the tournament for unspecified reasons. Iceland won the tournament and was promoted to Division II B for the 2013 World Juniors.

== Participating teams ==
Team	Qualification
Iceland	Placed 6th in Division II (Group A) last year and were relegated.
China	Placed 6th in Division II (Group B) last year and were relegated.
Turkey	Placed 4th in Division III last year.
New Zealand	Hosts; placed 5th in Division III last year.
Bulgaria	Placed 6th in Division III last year.

== Final standings ==
Pos	Team	Pld	W	OTW	OTL	L	GF	GA	GD	Pts	Promotion
1	Iceland	4	4	0	0	0	30	2	+28	12	Promoted to the 2013 Division II B
2	China	4	3	0	0	1	26	10	+16	9	
3	New Zealand (H)	4	2	0	0	2	19	14	+5	6	
4	Bulgaria	4	1	0	0	3	7	19	−12	3	
5	Turkey	4	0	0	0	4	1	38	−37	0	

Source: IIHF
(H) Host

== Match results ==
All times are local (New Zealand Daylight Time – UTC+13).

17 January 2012; 15:30	Bulgaria	2–6 (1–1, 0–3, 1–2)	China	Dunedin Ice Stadium; Attendance: 85

Game reference

Radosvet Petrov
Nikola Nikolov
Goalies
Xia Shengrong
Referee:
(Slovakia) Peter Loksik
Linesmen:
(New Zealand) Ryan Cairns
(United States) Dana Penkivech

	0–1	07:29 – Bao J. (Li N., Ji P.)
S. Georgiev (T. Kraynyanov, A. Todorov) (PP) – 14:50	1–1
	1–2	24:19 – Zhang C. (Li X., Wen C.)
	1–3	32:29 – Zhu X. (Wang T.) (PP)
	1–4	35:16 – Li N. (Zhang C.)
	1–5	51:36 – Zheng C. (Zhang S.) (PP)
	1–6	52:28 – Zheng C. (Zhu X., Na Y.)
N. Inzhevatov (P. Mihov, M. Talev) – 59:59	2–6

18 min
Penalties
43 min
23
Shots
32

17 January 2012; 19:00	Turkey	0–8 (0–3, 0–1, 0–4)	Iceland	Dunedin Ice Stadium; Attendance: 150

Game reference

Fikri Atali
Goalies
Daniel Johannsson
Snorri Sigurbergsson
Referee:
(Canada) Jamie Miller
Linesmen:
(France) Mathieu Loos
(Australia) Cory Ross

0–1	05:36 – O. Bjornsson (S. Reynisson, B. Sigurdarson) (PP)
0–2	12:02 – G. Sigurdsson (I. Eliasson)
0–3	14:19 – B. Sigurdarson (D. Magnusson)
0–4	38:51– O. Bjornsson (A. Helgason)
0–5	44:55 – G. Gudmundsson
0–6	45:47 – S. Ingason
0–7	48:19 – O. Olafsson
0–8	57:17 – S. Reynisson (O. Bjornsson, T. Omarsson) (PP)

12 min
Penalties
34 min
10
Shots
70

18 January 2012; 19:00	New Zealand	3–1 (1–0, 1–0, 1–1)	Bulgaria	Dunedin Ice Stadium; Attendance: 300

Game reference

Aston Brookes
Goalies
Radosvet Petrov
Referee:
(Denmark) Jan Bigum
Linesmen:
(South Korea) Choi Woo-Sik
(United States) Dana Penkivech

02:05 – K. Harnett (R. Sandoy) (PP)	1–0
23:57 – C. Harrison (G. Lloyd, L. Pickering)	2–0
43:36 – R. Sandoy (SH)	3–0
	3–1	45:37 – A. Vasilyev (A. Todorov)

45 min
Penalties
20 min
43
Shots
16

19 January 2012; 15:30	China	14–0 (1–0, 6–0, 7–0)	Turkey	Dunedin Ice Stadium; Attendance: 75

Game reference

Xia Shengrong
Goalies
Fikri Atali
Bahadir Sanoglu
Referee:
(Canada) Jamie Miller
Linesmen:
(New Zealand) Ryan Cairns
(South Korea) Choi Woo-Sik

09:40 – Zhang S. (Zhang C., Li H.) (PP)	1–0
20:15 – Zheng C. (Zhang C., Zhu X.)	2–0
20:52 – Li N. (Na Y.)	3–0
25:51 – Zheng C. (Zhang C., Zhu X.) (PP)	4–0
28:05 – Zhang C. (Zhu X.)	5–0
34:09 – Zhang C. (SH)	6–0
39:27 – Na Y. (SH)	7–0
45:32 – Li N. (Bao J.)	8–0
47:28 – Ji P. (Na Y., Bao J.) (PP)	9–0
49:26 – Li Y. (Zheng C.)	10–0
52:37 – Ji P. (Xia T.) (PP)	11–0
56:51 – Zheng C. (Zhu X.)	12–0
57:02 – Xia T. (Li N., Ji P.)	13–0
59:59 – Zhu Z. (Li X.) (SH)	14–0

26 min
Penalties
34 min
72
Shots
30

19 January 2012; 19:00	Iceland	7–1 (3–0, 4–0, 0–1)	New Zealand	Dunedin Ice Stadium; Attendance: 370

Game reference

Snorri Sigurbergsson
Goalies
Aston Brookes
Referee:
(Slovakia) Peter Loksik
Linesmen:
(France) Mathieu Loos
(Australia) Cory Ross

01:58 – J. Leifsson (S. Reynisson, B. Sigurdarson) (PP)	1–0
08:14 – B. Sigurdarson (O. Bjornsson, T. Omarsson)	2–0
14:09 – S. Reynisson (O. Bjornsson, B. Sigurdarson) (PP)	3–0
20:57 – J. Leifsson (S. Reynisson, I. Eliasson) (PP)	4–0
26:13 – B. Bergmann (PP)	5–0
36:03 – A. Helgason (G. Gudmundsson)	6–0
36:46 – S. Reynisson (I. Eliasson, O. Bjornsson) (PP)	7–0
	7–1	59:33 – R. Sandoy (C. Dale, J. Lawrence) (PP)

12 min
Penalties
18 min
55
Shots
27

20 January 2012; 19:00	Bulgaria	0–10 (0–4, 0–2, 0–4)	Iceland	Dunedin Ice Stadium; Attendance: 140

Game reference

Nikola Nikolov
Radosvet Petrov
Goalies
Daniel Johannsson
Referee:
(Denmark) Jan Bigum
Linesmen:
(New Zealand) Ryan Cairns
(South Korea) Choi Woo-Sik

0–1	00:31 – B. Bergmann
0–2	05:54 – B. Sigurdarson (O. Bjornsson)
0–3	07:32 – O. Olafsson (J. Leifsson, G. Gudmundsson)
0–4	11:26 – S. Ingason (B. Bergmann, G. Sigurdsson) (PP)
0–5	23:30 – O. Bjornsson (I. Arnason, (S. Reynisson)
0–6	24:40 – G. Gudmundsson (O. Olafsson, J. Leifsson)
0–7	43:01 – G. Sigurdsson (B. Bergmann, S. Ingason)
0–8	46:54 – G. Sigurdsson (S. Ingason, B. Bergmann)
0–9	51:04 – G. Sigurdsson (B. Bergmann, S. Ingason) (PP)
0–10	56:50 – S. Reynisson (B. Sigurdarson, O. Bjornsson)

8 min
Penalties
6 min
12
Shots
65

21 January 2012; 15:30	Turkey	0–4 (0–1, 0–2, 0–1)	Bulgaria	Dunedin Ice Stadium; Attendance: 70

Game reference

Fikri Atali
Goalies
Radosvet Petrov
Referee:
(Slovakia) Peter Loksik
Linesmen:
(United States) Dana Penkivech
(Australia) Cory Ross

0–1	12:22 – V. Chebishev
0–2	36:36 – M. Eftimov (K. Radovanov, N. Inzhevatov)
0–3	38:55 – N. Inzhevatov (V. Chebishev) (PP)
0–4	50:16 – M. Nikolov (PS)

14 min
Penalties
69 min
23
Shots
34

21 January 2012; 19:00	China	5–3 (1–3, 3–0, 1–0)	New Zealand	Dunedin Ice Stadium; Attendance: 375

Game reference

Xia Shengrong
Goalies
Aston Brookes
Referee:
(Canada) Jamie Miller
Linesmen:
(South Korea) Choi Woo-Sik
(France) Mathieu Loos

03:36 – Zhang C.	1–0
	1–1	11:02 – G. Lloyd (R. Wilson, C. Harrison) (PP)
	1–2	18:20 – J. Fuller (R. Sandoy)
	1–3	18:57 – J. Challis (K. Joyce)
25:31 – Ji P. (Bao J., Na Y.) (PP)	2–3
25:46 – Wang T. (Zheng C.)	3–3
34:31 – Zhang S. (Wang T., Zhang C.) (PP)	4–3
42:46 – Bao J.	5–3

20 min
Penalties
80 min
33
Shots
32

22 January 2012; 15:30	Iceland	5–1 (2–1, 1–0, 2–0)	China	Dunedin Ice Stadium; Attendance: 212

Game reference

Snorri Sigurbergsson
Goalies
Xia Shengrong
Referee:
(Denmark) Jan Bigum
Linesmen:
(New Zealand) Ryan Cairns
(France) Mathieu Loos

	0–1	02:39 – Li H. (Zhu Z., Zheng C.)
06:06 – I. Aranson (I. Eliasson, A. Ingason)	1–1
14:58 – S. Ingason (B. Bergmann, T. Omarsson) (PP)	2–1
28:06 – B. Sigurdarson (I. Eliasson, J. Leifsson) (PP)	3–1
55:59 – A. Ingason (J. Leifsson, O. Olafsson)	4–1
56:22 – O. Bjornsson (I. Eliasson, S. Reynisson) (PP)	5–1

10 min
Penalties
53 min
53
Shots
14

22 January 2012; 19:00	New Zealand	12–1 (3–1, 8–0, 1–0)	Turkey	Dunedin Ice Stadium; Attendance: 260

Game reference

Aston Brookes
Richard Bigsby
Goalies
Fikri Atali
Referee:
(Slovakia) Peter Loksik
Linesmen:
(United States) Dana Penkivech
(Australia) Cory Ross

	0–1	01:36 – G. Solak (D. Gonulal)
02:44 – R. Sandoy (K. Harnett, C. Harrison)	1–1
06:19 – J. Challis (R. Sandoy)	2–1
11:55 – C. Harrison (J. Lawrence, R. Sandoy)	3–1
22:25 – R. Sandoy (M. Frear, L. Pickering)	4–1
29:29 – J. Challis (J. Fuller)	5–1
29:44 – G. Lloyd (C. Harrison, R. Sandoy)	6–1
30:27 – R. Sandoy (M. Frear, J. Challis) (PP)	7–1
32:24 – M. Frear (J. Fuller, J. Challis)	8–1
35:18 – A. Gouldstone (S. Harrison, J. Currey)	9–1
36:45 – C. Harrison	10–1
39:29 – M. Frear (C. Harrison)	11–1
51:01 – C. Harrison (K. Joyce, R. Wilson) (PP)	12–1

10 min
Penalties
12 min
66
Shots
7

== Statistics ==
=== Top 10 scorers ===
Pos	Player	Country	GP	G	A	Pts	+/-	PIM
1	Remy Sandoy	New Zealand	4	5	5	10	+6	14
2	Olafur Bjornsson	Iceland	4	4	6	10	+5	0
3	Sigurdur Reynisson	Iceland	4	4	5	9	+7	2
3	Zhang Cheng	China	4	4	5	9	+6	35
5	Zheng Canji	China	4	5	3	8	+8	10
6	Connor Harrison	New Zealand	3	4	4	8	+3	35
7	Bjorn Sigurdarson	Iceland	4	4	4	8	+5	8
8	Brynjar Bergmann	Iceland	4	2	5	7	+3	16
9	Steindor Ingason	Iceland	4	3	3	6	+4	4
10	Johann Leifsson	Iceland	4	2	4	6	+4	4

=== Goaltending leaders ===
(minimum 40% team's total ice time)

Pos	Player	Country	MINS	GA	Sv%	GAA	SO
1	Snorri Sigurbergsson	Iceland	148:36	2	95.24	0.81	0
2	Xia Shengrong	China	240:00	10	92.75	2.50	1
3	Radosvet Petrov	Bulgaria	164:17	11	90.09	4.02	1
4	Aston Brookes	New Zealand	220:00	14	87.16	3.82	0
5	Fikri Atali	Turkey	213:43	35	85.23	9.83	0

== Awards ==
=== IIHF Best Player Awards ===
The following players were selected as the best at their position by the IIHF directorate:

- Goaltender: (China) Xia Shengrong
- Defenceman: (Iceland) Ingolfur Eliasson
- Forward: (China) Zhang Cheng
