= 2019 World Junior Ice Hockey Championships – Division III =

2019 IIHF U20 World Championship Division III

Tournament details
- Host country: Iceland
- Venue: 1 (in 1 host city)
- Dates: 14–20 January 2019
- Teams: 8

Tournament statistics
- Games played: 20
- Goals scored: 165 (8.25 per game)
- Attendance: 3,155 (158 per game)
- Scoring leader: (China) Yan Juncheng (20 points)

Official website
- www.iihf.com

The 2019 World Junior Ice Hockey Championship Division III was an international ice hockey tournament organized by the International Ice Hockey Federation. It was played in Reykjavík, Iceland, from 14 to 20 January 2019. Eight teams participated in the competition; they were drawn into two preliminary round groups of four. China won the tournament and were promoted to Division II B for 2020.

To be eligible as a junior, a player cannot be born earlier than 1999.

Bulgarian forward Miroslav Vasilev became the all-time leading scorer in Division III play with 42 points.

== Participating teams ==
Team	Qualification
Turkey	placed 6th in Division II B last year and were relegated
China	placed 2nd in Division III last year
Bulgaria	placed 3rd in Division III last year
Iceland	hosts; placed 4th in Division III last year
Australia	placed 5th in Division III last year
New Zealand	placed 6th in Division III last year
South Africa	placed 1st in Division III Qualification last year
Chinese Taipei	placed 2nd in Division III Qualification last year

== Preliminary round ==
All times are local (Western European Time – UTC±0).

=== Group A ===
Pos	Team	Pld	W	OTW	OTL	L	GF	GA	GD	Pts	Qualification
1	Australia	3	2	0	1	0	12	10	+2	7	Semifinals
2	Turkey	3	2	0	0	1	11	8	+3	6	Semifinals
3	Iceland (H)	3	1	1	0	1	11	8	+3	5	5th–8th place playoffs
4	Chinese Taipei	3	0	0	0	3	3	11	−8	0	5th–8th place playoffs

Source: IIHF
(H) Host

14 January 2019; 17:00	Iceland	5–4 OT (2–1, 1–1, 1–2) (OT: 1–0)	Australia	Laugardalur Arena, Reykjavík; Attendance: 532

Game reference

Maksymilian Mojzyszek
Goalies
Seb Woodlands
Referee:
(Canada) Fraser Lawrence
Linesmen:
(United States) Kevin Briganti
(Israel) Gil Haim Tichon

Maack (Árnason, G. Arason) (PP, EA) – 10:21	1–0
	1–1	11:01 – Vasquez (Manwarring, Wang) (SH)
Gunnarsson (Maack) (PP) – 15:48	2–1
Grant (Orongan, G. Arason) (PP) – 22:05	3–1
	3–2	35:48 – Wang (Wardlaw)
	3–3	40:30 – Vasquez (Sillato) (PP)
	3–4	50:45 – Wardlaw (Hayashi)
Kristveigarson (Atlason, Orongan) – 51:53	4–4
Orongan (Kristveigarson, Þorsteinsson) – 60:37	5–4

8 min
Penalties
38 min
36
Shots
26

14 January 2019; 20:30	Turkey	4–1 (3–0, 1–0, 0–1)	Chinese Taipei	Laugardalur Arena, Reykjavík; Attendance: 27

Game reference

Burak Gümüşlü
Goalies
Huang Sheng-chun
Referee:
(Romania) Zsolt Csomortani
Linesmen:
(Iceland) Óli Gunnarsson
(Denmark) Andreas Kroyer

Taygar (PP) – 13:32	1–0
Taygar – 14:23	2–0
Taygar (H. Salt) – 19:44	3–0
Gökçen (Elakaş) (PP) – 30:20	4–0
	4–1	58:58 – Sang (Chen K.)

6 min
Penalties
14 min
54
Shots
18

15 January 2019; 17:00	Iceland	4–0 (0–0, 2–0, 2–0)	Chinese Taipei	Laugardalur Arena, Reykjavík; Attendance: 350

Game reference

Maksymilian Mojzyszek
Goalies
Huang Sheng-сhun
Referee:
(Turkey) Cemal Ersin Kaya
Linesmen:
(Lithuania) Karolis Janušauskas
(Netherlands) Nicholas Verbruggen

Orongan (Grant) – 24:27	1–0
G. Arason (Grant) – 35:20	2–0
Grant (G. Arason) – 42:18	3–0
Gunnarsson – 58:00	4–0

8 min
Penalties
6 min
53
Shots
21

15 January 2019; 20:30	Australia	5–3 (1–0, 0–2, 4–1)	Turkey	Laugardalur Arena, Reykjavík; Attendance: 58

Game reference

Seb Woodlands
Goalies
Burak Gümüşlü
Referee:
(Germany) Christoffer Hurtik
Linesmen:
(Iceland) Sindri Gunnarson
(Austria) Daniel Sparer

Hayashi (Vasquez) (PP) – 13:29	1–0
	1–1	35:22 – Ulaş (PP)
	1–2	37:47 – Demirezen
McGuiness – 40:23	2–2
	2–3	43:32 – H. Salt
Vasquez (Manwarring, McGuiness) – 45:55	3–3
Wardlaw (Hayashi) – 47:25	4–3
Brunt – 59:25	5–3

24 min
Penalties
14 min
35
Shots
21

17 January 2019; 10:00	Chinese Taipei	2–3 (0–1, 0–2, 2–1)	Australia	Laugardalur Arena, Reykjavík; Attendance: 38

Game reference

Huang Sheng-chun
Goalies
Seb Woodlands
Referee:
(Romania) Zsolt Csomortani
Linesmen:
(Lithuania) Karolis Janušauskas
(Netherlands) Nicholas Verbruggen

	0–1	04:10 – Hayashi (Tripp, Lodge)
	0–2	35:08 – McGuiness (Manwarring, Vasquez)
Lin K. (Cheung) (PP) – 46:07	1–2
	1–3	51:04 – McGuiness (Manwarring)
Cheung (Chen P., Chen K.) – 58:47	2–3

18 min
Penalties
4 min
27
Shots
53

17 January 2019; 17:00	Turkey	4–2 (1–1, 1–1, 2–0)	Iceland	Laugardalur Arena, Reykjavík; Attendance: 400

Game reference

Burak Gümüşlü
Goalies
Maksymilian Mojzyszek
Referee:
(Czech Republic) Adam Kika
Linesmen:
(Mexico) Oscar Perez
(Austria) Daniel Sparer

H. Salt (PP) – 07:48	1–0
	1–1	10:42 – Kristveigarson (Orongan)
H. Salt – 23:15	2–1
	2–2	24:35 – Kristveigarson (V. Arason, Atlason) (SH)
Afşin (Salt) (PP) – 46:31	3–2
Bingöl (H. Salt) (ENG) – 59:43	4–2

6 min
Penalties
20 min
23
Shots
37

=== Group B ===
Pos	Team	Pld	W	OTW	OTL	L	GF	GA	GD	Pts	Qualification
1	China	3	3	0	0	0	32	3	+29	9	Semifinals
2	Bulgaria	3	2	0	0	1	20	7	+13	6	Semifinals
3	South Africa	3	1	0	0	2	3	24	−21	3	5th–8th place playoffs
4	New Zealand	3	0	0	0	3	1	22	−21	0	5th–8th place playoffs

Source: IIHF

14 January 2019; 10:00	Bulgaria	10–1 (2–0, 4–1, 4–0)	South Africa	Laugardalur Arena, Reykjavík; Attendance: 53

Game reference

Ivan Stoynov
Goalies
Ryan Boyd
Alistair Bywater
Referee:
(Turkey) Cemal Kaya
Linesmen:
(Iceland) Sindri Gunnarsson
(Netherlands) Nicholas Verbruggen

Vasilev (Vachkov) (SH) – 01:37	1–0
Vachkov (Vasilev, T. Abdi) (PP) – 14:37	2–0
	2–1	23:09 – Schuurman (J. Venter) (SH)
Dikov (Vasilev, Vachkov) (PP) – 25:44	3–1
Vachkov (Dikov) (PP) – 35:17	4–1
T. Abdi (Vachkov) (PP) – 36:51	5–1
Tsitselkov (Dzhorov, Nakov) – 37:00	6–1
Tsitselkov (Vasilev, Stoilov) – 47:32	7–1
Veselinov (Gatsev) (PP) – 52:48	8–1
Nakov – 56:01	9–1
Veselinov (Penchev) – 56:22	10–1

8 min
Penalties
14 min
36
Shots
22

14 January 2019; 13:30	China	12–1 (2–0, 5–0, 5–1)	New Zealand	Laugardalur Arena, Reykjavík; Attendance: 196

Game reference

Wu Siming
Goalies
Drew Kinney
Evan Froger
Referee:
(Germany) Christoffer Hurtik
Linesmen:
(United Kingdom) James Ions
(Austria) Daniel Sparer

Guo (Yan J., Zhang D.) – 00:13	1–0
Li (Yang) (EA) – 09:29	2–0
Chu (Wang J.) – 21:38	3–0
Huang (Wang J.) – 23:22	4–0
Yan J. (Guo, Zhang D.) (SH) – 31:14	5–0
Yan R. (Fu) – 33:39	6–0
Chu (Huang, Zhang D.) (PP) – 36:16	7–0
Chu (Huang, Wang J.) – 42:04	8–0
Huang (Zhang D.) – 53:11	9–0
	9–1	54:55 – Boul (Du Plooy, Tappin)
Huang (Wang J.) (SH) – 55:35	10–1
Guo (Yan J.) (SH) – 58:28	11–1
Wang J. (Huang) – 59:34	12–1

10 min
Penalties
8 min
77
Shots
12

15 January 2019; 10:00	Bulgaria	9–0 (3–0, 2–0, 4–0)	New Zealand	Laugardalur Arena, Reykjavík; Attendance: 33

Game reference

Ivan Stoynov
Nikola Georgiev
Goalies
Drew Kinney
Referee:
(Hong Kong) Wong Chun
Linesmen:
(United States) Kevin Briganti
(Mexico) Oscar Perez

Vasilev (Dikov) (PP) – 03:40	1–0
Penchev (Veselinov) – 11:59	2–0
Vachkov (Vasilev) (PP) – 19:03	3–0
T. Abdi (Vasilev) -28:35	4–0
Vasilev (PP) – 38:44	5–0
Penchev (Vasilev, Atanasov) – 43:04	6–0
Dikov (Tsitselkov) – 51:08	7–0
Vachkov (Stoilov) – 54:36	8–0
Tsitselkov (Vasilev) (PP) – 57:52	9–0

34 min
Penalties
16 min
42
Shots
21

15 January 2019; 13:30	South Africa	1–14 (0–5, 0–6, 1–3)	China	Laugardalur Arena, Reykjavík; Attendance: 45

Game reference

Ryan Boyd
Alistair Bywater
Goalies
Wu Siming
Referee:
(Czech Republic) Adam Kika
Linesmen:
(Iceland) Óli Gunnarsson
(Israel) Gil Haim Tichon

	0–1	01:44 – Si (Yan J., Zhang D.) (PP)
	0–2	04:07 – Si (Yan J., Yan R.) (PP)
	0–3	06:01 – Yan J. (Guo, Zhang D.)
	0–4	09:05 – Guo (Yan J., Zhang D.) (PP)
	0–5	09:19 – Huang (Wang J.)
	0–6	22:12 – Wang J. (SH)
	0–7	25:41 – Guo
	0–8	27:31 – Guo (Yan J.)
	0–9	33:21 – Zhang D. (Huang, Yan J.)
	0–10	37:22 – Li (Yan J., Yan R.)
	0–11	38:47 – Wang J.
	0–12	47:45 – Li (Yu, Si)
Schuurman (R. Venter) (PP) – 51:07	1–12
	1–13	54:15 – Huang (Wang J.)
	1–14	59:14 – Yang (Yan J.)

8 min
Penalties
18 min
13
Shots
61

17 January 2019; 13:30	New Zealand	0–1 (0–0, 0–0, 0–1)	South Africa	Laugardalur Arena, Reykjavík; Attendance: 42

Game reference
Drew Kinney	Goalies	Ryan Boyd	Referee: (Hong Kong) Wong Chun; Linesmen: (United States) Kevin Briganti (United Kingdom) James Ions
0–1 / 49:32 – Schuurman (R. Venter)			Referee: (Hong Kong) Wong Chun; Linesmen: (United States) Kevin Briganti (United Kingdom) James Ions
6 min	Penalties	6 min	Referee: (Hong Kong) Wong Chun; Linesmen: (United States) Kevin Briganti (United Kingdom) James Ions
25	Shots	31	Referee: (Hong Kong) Wong Chun; Linesmen: (United States) Kevin Briganti (United Kingdom) James Ions

17 January 2019; 20:30	China	6–1 (1–0, 2–1, 3–0)	Bulgaria	Laugardalur Arena, Reykjavík; Attendance: 143

Game reference

Zhang Yuhang
Goalies
Ivan Stoynov
Referee:
(Canada) Fraser Lawrence
Linesmen:
(Denmark) Andreas Kroyer
(Israel) Gil Haim Tichon

Zhang H. (Yu, Yan J.) – 10:32	1–0
	1–1	34:31 – Nakov
Wang J. (Yang, Fu) – 34:51	2–1
Guo (Yan J.) (SH) – 38:44	3–1
Yu (Li, Zhang D.) – 47:44	4–1
Yan J. (Guo, Zhang D.) (PP) – 53:13	5–1
Huang (Wang) – 57:24	6–1

14 min
Penalties
16 min
51
Shots
19

== 5th–8th place playoffs ==
=== Bracket ===
5th–8th place semifinals
3A	Iceland	11
4B	New Zealand	1
3B	South Africa	1
4A	Chinese Taipei	7

5th place game
3A	Iceland	5
4A	Chinese Taipei	3
7th place game
3B	South Africa	5
4B	New Zealand	3

=== 5th–8th place semifinals ===
19 January 2019; 10:00	Iceland	11–1 (6–0, 3–0, 2–1)	New Zealand	Laugardalur Arena, Reykjavík; Attendance: 258

Game reference

Arnar Hjaltested
Goalies
Drew Kinney
Evan Froger
Referee:
(Canada) Fraser Lawrence
Linesmen:
(United Kingdom) James Ions
(Mexico) Oscar Perez

Orongan (Atlason, G. Arason) – 00:17	1–0
Þorsteinsson (Kristveigarson) (PP) – 10:29	2–0
V. Arason (Helgason, Gunnarsson) – 14:32	3–0
Kristveigarson (Orongan, Atlason) (PP) – 15:35	4–0
Kristveigarson (SH) – 18:01	5–0
Orongan (Kristveirgarson) – 19:20	6–0
Kristveigarson (Atlason, Hjaltested) – 20:41	7–0
Atlason (Arnason, G. Arason) (PP) – 24:05	8–0
Kristveigarson (Orongan, Thorsteinsson) (PP) – 36:22	9–0
Rúnarsson (Orongan, Ágústsson) – 53:27	10–0
Kristveigarson (Orongan, Atlason) (PP) – 54:25	11–0
	11–1	56:28 – Hill (Flight)

4 min
Penalties
32 min
63
Shots
10

19 January 2019; 13:30	South Africa	1–7 (0–3, 1–2, 0–2)	Chinese Taipei	Laugardalur Arena, Reykjavík; Attendance: 42

Game reference

Alistair Bywater
Ryan Boyd
Goalies
Huang Sheng-chun
Lee Yi-cheng
Referee:
(Turkey) Cemal Kaya
Linesmen:
(United States) Kevin Briganti
(Iceland) Sindri Gunnarsson

	0–1	01:29 – Fu (Chen P., Chen K.)
	0–2	04:19 – Sang (Fu, Cheung) (PP)
	0–3	06:35 – Lin K. (Sang)
	0–4	20:47 – Sang (Chu, Yang H.)
	0–5	25:44 – Lin K. (Cheung) (PP)
Meyer (Johnson) – 39:38	1–5
	1–6	42:54 – Fu
	1–7	44:40 – Lin C. (Chen K.)

Penalties
22 min
36
Shots
31

=== Seventh place game ===
20 January 2019; 10:00	South Africa	5–3 (3–1, 0–2, 2–0)	New Zealand	Laugardalur Arena, Reykjavík; Attendance: 43

Game reference

Ryan Boyd
Goalies
Evan Froger
Referee:
(Czech Republic) Adam Kika
Linesmen:
(Lithuania) Karolis Janusauskas
(Denmark) Andreas Kroyer

	0–1	02:13 – Boul
Phakathi (R. Venter) – 02:50	1–1
Schuurman – 10:59	2–1
Schuurman (Phakathi) (PP) – 12:15	3–1
	3–2	34:07 – Hill
	3–3	37:12 – Boul (Lilly)
Delport (Meyer) – 50:20	4–3
Meyer (Delport, J. Venter) – 55:03	5–3

4 min
Penalties
4 min
38
Shots
31

=== Fifth place game ===
20 January 2019; 13:30	Iceland	5–3 (2–1, 2–1, 1–1)	Chinese Taipei	Laugardalur Arena, Reykjavík; Attendance: 295

Game reference

Arnar Hjaltested
Goalies
Huang Sheng-chun
Referee:
(Hong Kong) Wong Chung
Linesmen:
(United Kingdom) James Ions
(Israel) Gil Tichon

Atlason (Orongan, Kristveigarson) – 00:40	1–0
Maack (Grant) – 18:13	2–0
	2–1	19:00 – Chen K. (Fu)
Gunnarsson (G. Arason) (PP) – 21:39	3–1
Grant (Þorsteinsson) (PP) – 29:02	4–1
	4–2	36:48 – Lin K. (Chen K., Cheung) (PP)
	4–3	53:21 – Chen K. (Chen P.)
Orongan (Ágústsson) (ENG) – 59:08	5–3

10 min
Penalties
16 min
71
Shots
21

== Championship playoffs ==
=== Bracket ===
Semifinals
1A	Australia	7
2B	Bulgaria	4
1B	China	12
2A	Turkey	1

Final
1A	Australia	1
1B	China	5
3rd place game
2B	Bulgaria	0
2A	Turkey	6

=== Semifinals ===
19 January 2019; 17:00	Australia	7–4 (2–1, 1–2, 4–1)	Bulgaria	Laugardalur Arena, Reykjavík; Attendance: 75

Game reference

Seb Woodlands
Goalies
Ivan Stoynov
Referee:
(Czech Republic) Adam Kika
Linesmen:
(Denmark) Andreas Kroyer
(Austria) Daniel Sparer

Vasquez (McGuiness) (PP) – 07:17	1–0
	1–1	10:02 – Nakov
Sillato (Manwarring, Brunt) (PP) – 11:10	2–1
Brunt (Wardlaw, Sillato) – 25:13	3–1
	3–2	27:20 – Vasilev (T. Abdi)
	3–3	28:19 – Stoilov
Manwarring (Vasquez, McGuiness) – 44:15	4–3
	4–4	49:51 – T. Abdi (Vachkov, Vasilev) (PP)
Sillato (PP) – 56:59	5–4
Manwarring (Vasquez, Brunt) (PP, ENG) – 58:15	6–4
Hayashi (Sillato, Vasquez) (ENG) – 59:47	7–4

2 min
Penalties
40 min
44
Shots
32

19 January 2019; 20:30	China	12–1 (1–1, 5–0, 6–0)	Turkey	Laugardalur Arena, Reykjavík; Attendance: 100

Game reference

Wu Siming
Goalies
Burak Gümüşlü
Referee:
(Germany) Christoffer Hurtik
Linesmen:
(Iceland) Oli Gunnarsson
(Lithuania) Karolis Janusauskas

Chu (Huang, Wang J.) (PP) – 11:51	1–0
	1–1	19:24 – K. Salt (Taygar) (PP)
Yan R. (Zhang D., Yan J.) – 30:17	2–1
Li (Yu, Zhang D.) – 32:31	3–1
Yan R. (Guo, Yan J.) – 33:16	4–1
Yan J. (Guo, Zhang D.) – 35:46	5–1
Huang (Chu) – 35:59	6–1
Yan J. (Guo) – 40:45	7–1
Huang (Guo, Zhang D.) (PP) – 43:34	8–1
Yan J. (PP) – 46:02	9–1
Huang (Wang J., Zhang D.) (SH) – 48:47	10–1
Huang (Wang J.) – 55:51	11–1
Yu (Wang Y., Li) – 58:37	12–1

8 min
Penalties
28 min
55
Shots
21

=== Third place game ===
20 January 2019; 17:00	Bulgaria	0–6 (0–2, 0–2, 0–2)	Turkey	Laugardalur Arena, Reykjavík; Attendance: 69

Game reference

Ivan Stoynov
Goalies
Burak Gümüşlü
Referee:
(Germany) Christoffer Hurtik
Linesmen:
(Iceland) Oli Gunnarsson
(Austria) Daniel Sparer

0–1	14:19 – Demirezen (K. Salt, Bingöl) (PP)
0–2	15:09 – Bingol (Taygar, Demirezen)
0–3	34:24 – Gökçen (Şentürk, Taygar)
0–4	38:03 – Bingöl (Taygar) (SH)
0–5	41:04 – Bingöl (Taygar)
0–6	59:02 – Bingöl (Taygar, H. Salt) (PP)

24 min
Penalties
10 min
27
Shots
35

=== Final ===
20 January 2019; 20:30	China	5–1 (2–0, 1–0, 2–1)	Australia	Laugardalur Arena, Reykjavík; Attendance: 356

Game reference

Wu Siming
Goalies
Seb Woodlands
Ethan Spelde
Referee:
(Canada) Fraser Lawrence
Linesmen:
(United States) Kevin Briganti
(Netherlands) Nicholas Verbruggen

Yan J. (Yan R., Guo) – 06:21	1–0
Wang J. (Huang) – 06:54	2–0
Guo (Wu) (PP) – 22:09	3–0
Huang – 42:32	4–0
Huang (Zhang D.) (PP) – 50:08	5–0
	5–1	55:03 – Hayashi (SH)

41 min
Penalties
36 min
50
Shots
20

=== Group standings ===
Pos	Team	Pld	W	OTW	OTL	L	GF	GA	GD	Pts	Qualification
1	China	5	5	0	0	0	49	5	+44	15	Promoted to the 2020 Division II B
2	Australia	5	3	0	1	1	20	19	+1	10	
3	Turkey	5	3	0	0	2	18	20	−2	9	
4	Bulgaria	5	2	0	0	3	24	20	+4	6	
5	Iceland (H)	5	3	1	0	1	27	12	+15	11	
6	Chinese Taipei	5	1	0	0	4	13	17	−4	3	
7	South Africa	5	2	0	0	3	9	34	−25	6	
8	New Zealand	5	0	0	0	5	5	38	−33	0	

(H) Host

== Statistics ==
=== Top 10 scorers ===
Pos	Player	Country	GP	G	A	Pts	+/-	PIM
1	Yan Juncheng	China	5	7	13	20	+19	0
2	Huang Qianyi	China	5	11	8	19	+17	32
3	Wang Jing	China	5	5	10	15	+16	0
4	Zhang Dehan	China	5	1	14	15	+19	0
5	Guo Jianing	China	5	7	7	14	+15	2
6	Axel Orongan	Iceland	5	5	8	13	+6	14
7	Heidar Kristveigarson	Iceland	5	8	4	12	+6	0
8	Miroslav Vasilev	Bulgaria	4	3	9	12	+4	38
9	Jeremy Vasquez	Australia	5	4	5	9	+3	4
10	Fatih Taygar	Turkey	5	3	6	9	+1	2

GP = Games played; G = Goals; A = Assists; Pts = Points; +/− = P Plus–minus; PIM = Penalties In Minutes
Source: IIHF

=== Goaltending leaders ===
(minimum 40% team's total ice time)

Pos	Player	Country	MINS	GA	Sv%	GAA	SO
1	Wu Siming	China	240:00	4	93.94	1.00	0
2	Huang Sheng-Chun	Chinese Taipei	283:23	16	93.73	3.39	0
3	Maksymilian Mojzyszek	Iceland	179:00	7	89.86	2.34	1
4	Ivan Stoynov	Bulgaria	283:32	17	89.76	3.60	0
5	Burak Gümüşlü	Turkey	300:00	20	88.30	4.00	1

TOI = Time on ice (minutes:seconds); GA = Goals against; GAA = Goals against average; Sv% = Save percentage; SO = Shutouts
Source: IIHF

=== Awards ===
Best Players Selected by the Directorate

- Goaltender: (Chinese Taipei) Hung Sheng-Chun
- Defenceman: (China) Zhang Dehan
- Forward: (Iceland) Heidar Kristveigarson
