= Iceland men's national junior ice hockey team =

Iceland
- Association: Ice Hockey Iceland
- Head coach: (Sweden) Bjorn Ferber
- Assistants: (Iceland) Vilhelm Bjarnason
- Captain: Ingolfur Eliasson
- Most points: Emil Alengard (36)
- Team colors
- IIHF code: ISL

First international
- Yugoslavia 15 - 1 Iceland (Novi Sad, Yugoslavia; December 29, 1998)

Biggest win
- Iceland 50 - 0 Armenia (Elektrėnai, Lithuania; January 4, 2006)

Biggest defeat
- Poland 26 - 1 Iceland (Sosnowiec, Poland; December 31, 2004

IIHF World Junior Championship
- Appearances: 26 (first in 1999)
- Best result: 31st (2003, 2007, 2024)

International record (W–L–T)
- 18-38-2

The Icelandic men's national under 20 ice hockey team is the national under-20 ice hockey team in Iceland. The team represents Iceland at the International Ice Hockey Federation's IIHF World Junior Championship.

== International competitions ==
=== World Junior Championships ===
- 1999 – 34th overall (8th in Pool D)
- 2000 – 35th overall (9th in Pool D)
- 2001 – 35th overall (1st in Division III Qualification)
- 2002 – 32nd overall (6th in Division II)
- 2003 – 31st overall (5th in Division II)
- 2004 – 33rd overall (6th in Division II, Group A)
- 2005 – 37th overall (3rd in Division III)
- 2006 – 36th overall (2nd in Division III)
- 2007 – 31st overall (5th in Division II, Group A)
- 2008 – 33rd overall (6th in Division IIA)
- 2009 – Division III tournament cancelled
- 2010 – 36th overall (2nd in Division III)
- 2011 – 32nd overall (6th in Division IIA)
- 2012 – 35th overall (1st in Division III)
- 2013 – 33rd overall (5th in Division IIB)
- 2014 – 33rd overall (5th in Division IIB)
- 2015 – 34th overall (6th in Division IIB)
- 2016 – 39th overall (5th in Division III)
- 2017 – 37th overall (3rd in Division III)
- 2018 – 38th overall (4th in Division III)
- 2019 – 39th overall (5th in Division III)
- 2020 – 35th overall (1st in Division III)
- 2021 – Cancelled due to COVID-19 pandemic
- 2022 – 33rd overall (5th in Division IIB)
- 2023 – 32nd overall (4th in Division IIB)
- 2024 – 31st overall (3rd in Division IIB)
- 2025 – 33rd overall (5th in Division IIB)
- 2026 – 34th overall (6th in Division IIB)
