= 2020 World Junior Ice Hockey Championships – Division III =

2020 IIHF U20 World Championship Division III

Tournament details
- Host country: Bulgaria
- Venue: 1 (in 1 host city)
- Dates: 13–19 January 2020
- Teams: 8

Tournament statistics
- Games played: 20
- Goals scored: 134 (6.7 per game)
- Attendance: 5,276 (264 per game)
- Scoring leader: (Iceland) Axel Orongan (16 points)

Official website
- www.iihf.com

The 2020 World Junior Ice Hockey Championship Division III was an international ice hockey tournament organized by the International Ice Hockey Federation. It was played in Sofia, Bulgaria, from 13 to 19 January 2020. Eight teams participated in the competition; they were drawn into two preliminary round groups of four: the top two teams from each group played in the semifinals in a four-team bracket for a chance to play for promotion to Division II B, while the bottom two teams in each group played in placement rounds for 5th to 8th place. Iceland won the tournament.

To be eligible as a junior player in these tournaments, a player couldn't be born earlier than 2000.

== Participating teams ==
Team	Qualification
Mexico	placed 6th in Division II B last year and were relegated
Australia	placed 2nd in Division III last year
Turkey	placed 3rd in Division III last year
Bulgaria	hosts; placed 4th in Division III last year
Iceland	placed 5th in Division III last year
Chinese Taipei	placed 6th in Division III last year
South Africa	placed 7th in Division III last year
New Zealand	placed 8th in Division III last year

== Match officials ==
Six referees and 10 linesmen were selected for the tournament.

Referees

- (Russia) Anton Gofman
- (Austria) Patrick Gruber
- (China) Liu Jiaqi
- (Romania) Levente Szilárd Sikó
- (Finland) Sakari Suominen
- (Australia) Kent Unwin

Linesmen

- (Austria) Christoph Barnthaler
- (Romania) Imre Fehér
- (China) Gao Yinfeng
- (Hungary) Barna Kis-Király
- (Belarus) Artsiom Labzov
- (Iceland) Sæmundur Leifsson
- (Netherlands) Stef Oosterling
- (Bulgaria) Kiril Peychinov
- (United Kingdom) Graham Rodger
- (Bulgaria) Vasiliy Vasilev

== Preliminary round ==
Division III Venue
Sofia
Winter Sports Palace
Capacity: 4,600

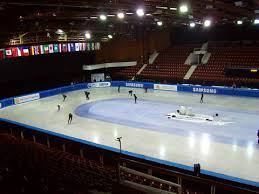

All times are local (Eastern European Time – UTC+2).

=== Group A ===
Pos	Team	Pld	W	OTW	OTL	L	GF	GA	GD	Pts	Qualification
1	Iceland	3	3	0	0	0	19	6	+13	9	Semifinals
2	Mexico	3	2	0	0	1	12	7	+5	6	Semifinals
3	Bulgaria (H)	3	1	0	0	2	8	11	−3	3	5th–8th place playoffs
4	New Zealand	3	0	0	0	3	3	18	−15	0	5th–8th place playoffs

Source: IIHF
(H) Host

13 January 2020; 17:00	Mexico	5–0 (1–0, 2–0, 2–0)	New Zealand	Winter Sports Palace, Sofia; Attendance: 115

Game reference

Marcello de Antunano
Goalies
Finley Forbes
Referee:
(China) Liu Jiaqi
Linesmen:
(Hungary) Barna Kis-Király
(Bulgaria) Vasiliy Vasilev

Hagerman (Dunn, Linares) (PP) – 09:59	1–0
Dunn – 28:55	2–0
Dunn (Sánchez, Tapia) – 30:28	3–0
Sánchez (Dunn, Tapia) – 45:38	4–0
Dunn – 49:09	5–0

18 min
Penalties
10 min
37
Shots
14

13 January 2020; 20:30	Bulgaria	3–4 (1–1, 0–2, 2–1)	Iceland	Winter Sports Palace, Sofia; Attendance: 760

Game reference

Ivan Stoynov
Goalies
Jóhann Ragnarsson
Referee:
(Russia) Anton Gofman
Linesmen:
(Belarus) Artsiom Labzov
(United Kingdom) Graham Rodger

Vasilev – 08:27	1–0
	1–1	17:37 – Magnússon (Árnason)
	1–2	26:04 – Atlason
	1–3	36:03 – Árnason (Orongan)
Vasilev (PP) – 41:12	2–3
Vachkov (EA) – 59:42	3–3
	3–4	59:59 – Rúnarsson

8 min
Penalties
10 min
18
Shots
45

14 January 2020; 17:00	Iceland	5–2 (1–0, 3–2, 1–0)	Mexico	Winter Sports Palace, Sofia; Attendance: 110

Game reference

Jóhann Ragnarsson
Goalies
Santiago Gómez
Referee:
(Finland) Sakari Suominen
Linesmen:
(Romania) Imre Fehér
(Bulgaria) Kiril Peychinov

Atlason (Orongan) – 12:19	1–0
Orongan – 20:19	2–0
Arason (Magnússon, Atlason) – 28:51	3–0
Sveinsson (Orongan, Kristveigarson (PP) – 29:52	4–0
	4–1	31:06 – Rullan (Hagerman)
	4–2	39:52 – Olvera (Hagerman, Linares)
Kristveigarson (Atlason, Orongan) (ENG) – 59:49	5–2

20 min
Penalties
28 min
31
Shots
11

14 January 2020; 20:30	Bulgaria	3–2 (0–0, 2–1, 1–1)	New Zealand	Winter Sports Palace, Sofia; Attendance: 850

Game reference

Ivan Stoynov
Goalies
Finley Forbes
Referee:
(Romania) Levente Szilárd Sikó
Linesmen:
(Austria) Christoph Barnthaler
(Iceland) Sæmundur Leifsson

Vasilev (Vachkov, Tomov) – 21:50	1–0
Ivanov (Nakov) – 25:36	2–0
	2–1	35:25 – Robbie (Martinoli)
	2–2	41:19 – Martinoli (Reid)
Dzhorov – 44:54	3–2

10 min
Penalties
33 min
26
Shots
12

16 January 2020; 13:30	New Zealand	1–10 (1–4, 0–2, 0–4)	Iceland	Winter Sports Palace, Sofia; Attendance: 65

Game reference

Rhett Wilson
Goalies
Johann Ragnarsson
Referee:
(Australia) Kent Unwin
Linesmen:
(Austria) Christoph Barnthaler
(Bulgaria) Kiril Peychinov

Audas (Flight) – 02:02	1–0
	1–1	04:35 – Kristveigarson (V. Arason, Magnússon)
	1–2	06:08 – Orongan (SH2)
	1–3	14:13 – Sveinsson (Grant, Ólafarson) (PP)
	1–4	19:39 – Orongan
	1–5	20:49 – Orongan (G. Arason)
	1–6	33:05 – Skulason (Magnusson, Gunnarsson)
	1–7	47:02 – Grant (Sveinsson, Ólafarson)
	1–8	49:24 – Kristveigarson
	1–9	49:52 – Rúnarsson (Magnusson)
	1–10	58:26 – G. Arason (Maack, Orongan)

8 min
Penalties
20 min
21
Shots
30

16 January 2020; 20:30	Mexico	5–2 (1–0, 3–0, 1–2)	Bulgaria	Winter Sports Palace, Sofia; Attendance: 920

Game reference

Marcello de Antunano
Goalies
Ivan Stoynov
Referee:
(Austria) Patrick Gruber
Linesmen:
(China) Gao Yinfeng
(Netherlands) Stef Oosterling

Linares (Dunn, Esteban) (PP) – 16:41	1–0
Sanchez (Hagerman, Dunn) – 27:46	2–0
Hagerman (Dunn, Rullan (EA) – 31:02	3–0
Rullan (Esteban) – 35:25	4–0
Esteban (Diaz, Hagerman) – 46:11	5–0
	5–1	50:16 – Tsitselkov (Tomov, Dikov) (EA)
	5–2	52:08 – Nakov (Vachkov, Tsitselkov)

16 min
Penalties
22 min
32
Shots
18

=== Group B ===
Pos	Team	Pld	W	OTW	OTL	L	GF	GA	GD	Pts	Qualification
1	Australia	3	3	0	0	0	14	3	+11	9	Semifinals
2	Turkey	3	2	0	0	1	11	4	+7	6	Semifinals
3	South Africa	3	1	0	0	2	7	15	−8	3	5th–8th place playoffs
4	Chinese Taipei	3	0	0	0	3	3	13	−10	0	5th–8th place playoffs

Source: IIHF

13 January 2020; 10:00	Turkey	3–0 (2–0, 1–0, 0–0)	Chinese Taipei	Winter Sports Palace, Sofia; Attendance: 120

Game reference

Soykan Varlı
Goalies
Chung Shen-wei
Referee:
(Romania) Levente Szilárd Sikó
Linesmen:
(Austria) Christoph Barnthaler
(Bulgaria) Kiril Peychinov

Turan (Salt, Afşin) – 11:10	1–0
Turut (Kabay, Turan) (PP) – 15:05	2–0
Afşin (Turan, Kabay) – 20:54	3–0

0 min
Penalties
14 min
27
Shots
14

13 January 2020; 13:30	Australia	6–1 (0–1, 5–0, 1–0)	South Africa	Winter Sports Palace, Sofia; Attendance: 125

Game reference

Seb Woodlands
Jeremy Friederich
Goalies
Ryan Boyd
Referee:
(Finland) Sakari Suominen
Linesmen:
(Romania) Imre Fehér
(Iceland) Sæmundur Leifsson

	0–1	05:52 – Delport (Vivier, Venter) (PP)
Lee (Riley) (PP) – 22:06	1–1
Gumm (SH) – 25:43	2–1
Riley (Lee) (SH) – 31:14	3–1
Barton (Chen, Handberg) – 37:07	4–1
Wardlaw (Kiliwnik, Hayashi) (PP) – 39:38	5–1
Wardlaw (Kiliwnik, Chen) – 49:19	6–1

14 min
Penalties
12 min
30
Shots
12

14 January 2020; 10:00	Turkey	6–1 (2–0, 1–0, 3–1)	South Africa	Winter Sports Palace, Sofia; Attendance: 95

Game reference

Soykan Varlı
Goalies
Ryan Boyd
Referee:
(Australia) Kent Unwin
Linesmen:
(China) Gao Yinfeng
(Netherlands) Stef Oosterling

Gökçen (Afşin) (EA) – 13:38	1–0
Afşin (Kabay, Turan (PP2) – 16:36	2–0
Turan (Kabay, Gökçen) – 28:59	3–0
Demirezen (Turut, Kızılkaya) – 48:53	4–0
Afşin (Turan, Gökçen) – 49:26	5–0
Gökçen (Kabay, Afşin) – 52:21	6–0
	6–1	53:13 – Vivier (Van der Merwe)

8 min
Penalties
32 min
32
Shots
12

14 January 2020; 13:30	Chinese Taipei	0–5 (0–0, 0–4, 0–1)	Australia	Winter Sports Palace, Sofia; Attendance: 85

Game reference

Chung Shen-wei
Lee Yi-cheng
Goalies
Seb Woodlands
Referee:
(Austria) Patrick Gruber
Linesmen:
(Belarus) Artsiom Labzov
(Bulgaria) Vasiliy Vasilev

0–1	23:20 – Lodge (Wardlaw)
0–2	34:33 – Lee (Lodge, Wardlaw) (PP)
0–3	38:30 – Ransome (Handberg, Benson)
0–4	39:08 – Wardlaw (Lodge, Hayashi)
0–5	56:02 – Riley (Barton, Urweiss)

20 min
Penalties
26 min
19
Shots
37

16 January 2020; 10:00	South Africa	5–3 (0–0, 2–2, 3–1)	Chinese Taipei	Winter Sports Palace, Sofia; Attendance: 60

Game reference

Ryan Boyd
Goalies
Lee Yi-cheng
Referee:
(Russia) Anton Gofman
Linesmen:
(Hungary) Barna Kis-Király
(Bulgaria) Vasiliy Vasilev

	0–1	20:21 – Chang T. (Chuang, Liu)
	0–2	21:19 – Chuang (Sang, Sun) (PP)
Schuurman (PP) – 29:06	1–2
Venter (Vivier) – 34:24	2–2
	2–3	42:02 – Lin J.
Meyer (Delport) – 49:38	3–3
Schuurman – 56:54	4–3
Vivier (Meyer) (PP, ENG) – 59:49	5–3

34 min
Penalties
6 min
24
Shots
28

16 January 2020; 17:00	Australia	3–2 (0–1, 3–0, 0–1)	Turkey	Winter Sports Palace, Sofia; Attendance: 105

Game reference

Seb Woodlands
Goalies
Soykan Varlı
Referee:
(China) Liu Jiaqi
Linesmen:
(Iceland) Sæmundur Leifsson
(United Kingdom) Graham Rodger

	0–1	13:18 – Salt (Afşin) (PP2)
Riley (Gumm) – 21:38	1–1
Lee (Kiliwnik, Benson) (SH) – 36:28	2–1
Wardlaw (PP) – 38:36	3–1
	3–2	43:29 – Turan (Gökçen)

12 min
Penalties
6 min
22
Shots
29

== 5th–8th place playoffs ==
=== Bracket ===
5th–8th place semifinals
18 January
Bulgaria	8
Chinese Taipei	1
18 January
South Africa	1
New Zealand	2

5th place match
19 January
Bulgaria	6
New Zealand	1
7th place match
19 January
South Africa	4
Chinese Taipei (OT)	5

=== 5th–8th place semifinals ===
18 January 2020; 10:00	Bulgaria	8–1 (2–1, 1–0, 5–0)	Chinese Taipei	Winter Sports Palace, Sofia; Attendance: 450

Game reference

Ivan Stoynov
Goalies
Lee Yi-cheng
Chung Sheng-wei
Referee:
(Finland) Sakari Suominen
Linesmen:
(Romania) Imre Fehér
(Belarus) Artsiom Labzov

Minev (Vasilev, Tomov) – 12:07	1–0
	1–1	12:43 – Liu (Sang, Yu)
Plajner (Dzhorov) – 16:09	2–1
Minev (Vasilev, Borisov) – 39:36	3–1
Vachkov (Ivanov) – 44:41	4–1
Nakov (Tsitselkov, Minev) – 45:51	5–1
Abdi (Ivanov, Vachkov) – 46:28	6—1
Vasilev (Atanasov, Borisov) – 47:25	7–1
Ivanov – 49:48	8–1

8 min
Penalties
12 min
27
Shots
21

18 January 2020; 13:30	South Africa	1–2 (1–1, 0–0, 0–1)	New Zealand	Winter Sports Palace, Sofia; Attendance: 75

Game reference

Ryan Boyd
Goalies
Finley Forbes
Referee:
(Russia) Anton Gofman
Linesmen:
(Bulgaria) Kiril Peychinov
(Bulgaria) Vasiliy Vasilev

	0–1	08:11 – Flight (Audas)
Venter (PP) – 15:22	1–1
	1–2	53:36 – Boul

2 min
Penalties
8 min
27
Shots
16

=== Seventh place game ===
19 January 2020; 10:00	South Africa	4–5 OT (0–1, 2–1, 2–2) (OT: 0–1)	Chinese Taipei	Winter Sports Palace, Sofia; Attendance: 55

Game reference

Ryan Boyd
Goalies
Chung Sheng-wei
Referee:
(Australia) Kent Unwin
Linesmen:
(Romania) Imre Fehér
(Iceland) Sæmundur Leifsson

	0–1	12:06 – Mi (Lin Y.)
Koekemoer-Brown (Kluyts, Schuurman) – 25:44	1–1
	1–2	30:15 – Mi (Yu, Lin J.) – 30:15
Kluyts (Venter) – 31:41	2–2
	2–3	47:24 – Sun (Liang
	2–4	50:10 – Chen (Liang)
Delport (Vivier, Meyer) – 53:51	3–4
Delport (Venter, Schuurman) (PP) – 59:59	4–4
	4–5	64:32 – Mi

20 min
Penalties
24 min
27
Shots
19

=== Fifth place game ===
19 January 2020; 13:30	Bulgaria	6–1 (2–0, 2–1, 2–0)	New Zealand	Winter Sports Palace, Sofia; Attendance: 510

Game reference

Nikola Iliev
Goalies
Finley Forbes
Referee:
(China) Liu Jiaqi
Linesmen:
(China) Gao Yinfeng
(Netherlands) Stef Oosterling

Abdi – 04:43	1–0
Vasilev (SH) – 08:41	2–0
Dikov (PP) – 24:54	3–0
	3–1	32:05 – Flight (Boul)
Nakov – 38:57	4–1
Vasilev (Dzhorov, Dikov) (PP) – 45:32	5–1
Ivanov (Atanasov) – 55:59	6–1

44 min
Penalties
12 min
27
Shots
29

== Championship playoffs ==
=== Bracket ===
Semifinals
18 January
Iceland	5
Turkey	2
18 January
Australia	8
Mexico	3

Final
19 January
Iceland	4
Australia	1
3rd place match
19 January
Turkey	4
Mexico	2

=== Semifinals ===
18 January 2020; 17:00	Australia	8–3 (3–2,3–0, 2–1)	Mexico	Winter Sports Palace, Sofia; Attendance: 81

Game reference

Seb Woodlands
Jeremy Friederich
Goalies
Marcello de Antunano
Santiago Gomez
Referee:
(Romania) Levente Szilárd Sikó
Linesmen:
(Netherlands) Stef Oosterling
(United Kingdom) Graham Rodger

	0–1	02:27 – Hagerman (Rullan)
	0–2	07:00 – Esterban (Hagerman)
Gumm (Riley, Sables) (PP) – 08:10	1–2
Handberg (Wang, Benson) – 10:12	2–2
Hayashi (Lodge) – 12:50	3–2
Hayashi (Lodge) – 21:23	4–2
Hayashi (Riley, Clifford) (PP) – 23:53	5–2
Hayashi (Wardlaw, Kiliwnik – 28:26	6–2
Fodor (James, Ransome) – 53:58	7–2
Handberg (Gumm, Sables) – 55:37	8–2
	8–3	57:39 – Hagerman (Dunn, Linares) (PP)

12 min
Penalties
22 min
24
Shots
20

18 January 2020; 20:30	Iceland	5–2 (1–1, 4–0, 0–0)	Turkey	Winter Sports Palace, Sofia; Attendance: 95

Game reference

Jóhann Ragnarsson
Goalies
Soykan Varlı
Eren Demirtürk
Referee:
(China) Liu Jiaqi
Linesmen:
(China) Gao Yinfeng
(Hungary) Barna Kis-Király

Skúlason (Magnússon, Grant) – 16:16	1–0
	1–1	16:54 – Afşin (Gökçen, Turan)
Orongan – 21:52	2–1
Atlason (Orongan, Kristveigarson) – 29:30	3–1
Orongan (V. Arason, G. Arason) – 34:27	4–1
Atlason (Arnarsson, Orongan) – 35:12	5–1
	5–2	57:48 – Gökçen (SH)

8 min
Penalties
6 min
22
Shots
19

=== Third place game ===
19 January 2020; 17:00	Turkey	4–2 (1–1, 1–1, 2–0)	Mexico	Winter Sports Palace, Sofia; Attendance: 250

Game reference

Eren Demirturk
Goalies
Marcello de Antunano
Referee:
(Finland) Sakari Suominen
Linesmen:
(Hungary) Barna Kis-Király
(United Kingdom) Graham Rodger

	0–1	14:34 – Hagerman (Ortiz, Rullan) (PP)
Kızılkaya (Salt, Gökçen) (PP) – 16:33	1–1
	1–2	26:13 – Hagerman (Dunn, Rullan) (PP)
Demirezen (Kızılkaya, Gökçen) – 35:46	2–2
Turut (Kızılkaya) – 45:55	3–2
Turut (Demirezen) (ENG) – 59:39	4–2

14 min
Penalties
32 min
25
Shots
26

=== Final ===
19 January 2020; 20:30	Iceland	4–1; 1–0, 2–0, 1–1	Australia	Winter Sports Palace, Sofia; Attendance: 350

Game reference

Jóhann Ragnarsson
Goalies
Seb Woodlands
Referee:
(Russia) Anton Gofman
Linesmen:
(Austria) Christoph Barnthaler
(Belarus) Artsiom Labzov

Jóhannsson (Kristveigarson) – 18:08	1–0
Orongan (SH) – 22:47	2–0
Orongan (PP) – 34:40	3–0
Kristveigarson (Orongan) – 40:17	4–0
	4–1	43:12 – Ransome (Barton, Kiliwnik)

22 min
Penalties
10 min
26
Shots
16

=== Group standings ===
Pos	Team	Pld	W	OTW	OTL	L	GF	GA	GD	Pts	Qualification
1	Iceland	3	3	0	0	0	19	6	+13	9	Promoted to the 2022 Division II B
2	Australia	3	3	0	0	0	14	3	+11	9	
3	Turkey	3	2	0	0	1	11	4	+7	6	
4	Mexico	3	2	0	0	1	12	7	+5	6	
5	Bulgaria (H)	3	1	0	0	2	8	11	−3	3	
6	New Zealand	3	0	0	0	3	3	18	−15	0	
7	Chinese Taipei	3	0	0	0	3	3	13	−10	0	
8	South Africa	3	1	0	0	2	7	15	−8	3	

(H) Host

== Statistics ==
=== Top 10 scorers ===
Pos	Player	Country	GP	G	A	Pts	+/–	PIM
1	Axel Orongan	Iceland	5	8	8	16	+13	2
2	Gonzalo Hagerman	Mexico	5	6	5	11	+3	32
3	Benjamin Dunn	Mexico	5	3	7	10	0	20
4	Firat Afsin	Turkey	5	4	5	9	+7	2
5	İsmet Gökçen	Turkey	5	3	6	9	+8	0
6	Miroslav Vasilev	Bulgaria	5	6	2	8	+4	26
7	Mehmet Turan	Turkey	5	3	5	8	+6	8
8	Heidar Kristveigarson	Iceland	5	4	3	7	+10	0
8	Xander Wardlaw	Australia	5	4	3	7	+5	2
10	Sölvi Atlason	Iceland	5	4	2	6	+10	0
10	Kenshin Hayashi	Australia	5	4	2	6	+4	2

GP = Games played; G = Goals; A = Assists; Pts = Points; +/− = P Plus–minus; PIM = Penalties In Minutes
Source: IIHF

=== Goaltending leaders ===
(minimum 40% team's total ice time)

Pos	Player	Country	TOI	GA	Sv%	GAA	SO
1	Seb Woodlands	Australia	274:55	9	90.32	1.96	1
2	Jóhann Ragnarsson	Iceland	280:00	9	89.02	1.93	0
3	Ivan Stoyov	Bulgaria	226:48	12	88.12	3.17	0
4	Marcello de Antunano	Mexico	234:06	10	87.50	2.56	1
5	Finley Forbes	New Zealand	238:57	15	87.18	3.77	0

TOI = Time on ice (minutes:seconds); GA = Goals against; GAA = Goals against average; Sv% = Save percentage; SO = Shutouts
Source: IIHF.com

== Awards ==
=== Best Players Selected by the Directorate ===
Award	Name
Best Goalkeeper	(Australia) Seb Woodlands
Best Defenceman	(Mexico) Gonzalo Hagerman
Best Forward	(Iceland) Axel Orongan

Source: IIHF

=== Best Players of Each Team Selected by Coaches ===
Country	Name
Australia	Michael Riley
Bulgaria	Moussa Abdi
Iceland	Axel Orongan
Mexico	Gonzalo Hagerman
New Zealand	Finley Forbes
South Africa	Ryan Boyd
Chinese Taipei	Mi Huan-yu
Turkey	Haktan Kabay

Source: IIHF
