= 2015 World Junior Ice Hockey Championships – Division III =

2015 IIHF U20 World Championship Division III

Tournament details
- Host country: New Zealand
- City: Dunedin
- Venue: 1 (in 1 host city)
- Dates: 20–25 January 2015
- Teams: 5

The 2015 World Junior Ice Hockey Championship Division III was an international ice hockey tournament organized by the International Ice Hockey Federation. It was played in Dunedin, New Zealand, from 20 to 25 January 2015. Division III represents the sixth tier of the World Junior Ice Hockey Championships. The winners, China, were promoted to the Division II B for the 2016 tournament.

Bulgaria withdrew from the tournament on 27 December 2014.

== Participating teams ==
Team	Qualification
China	Finished 6th in Division II B last year and were relegated.
New Zealand	Hosts; finished 2nd in Division III last year.
Mexico	Finished 3rd in Division III last year.
Turkey	Finished 4th in Division III last year.
South Africa	Finished 5th in Division III last year.

== Final standings ==
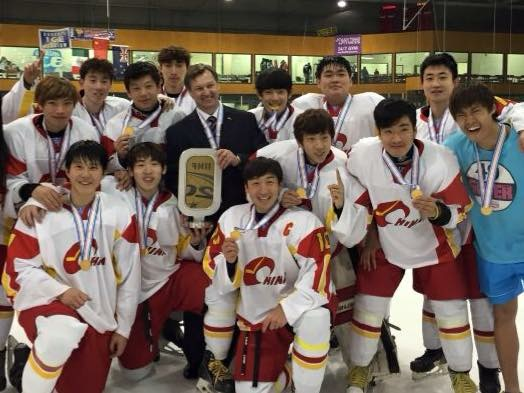
The Chinese team after winning the tournament

Pos	Team	Pld	W	OTW	OTL	L	GF	GA	GD	Pts	Promotion
1	China	4	4	0	0	0	29	3	+26	12	Promoted to the 2016 Division II B
2	New Zealand (H)	4	2	0	1	1	13	11	+2	7	
3	Mexico	4	1	1	0	2	8	10	−2	5	
4	South Africa	4	1	0	0	3	4	22	−18	3	
5	Turkey	4	1	0	0	3	7	15	−8	3	

Source: IIHF
(H) Host

== Match results ==
All times are local (New Zealand Daylight Time – UTC+13).

20 January 2015; 15:30	Mexico	1–6 (0–0, 0–4, 1–2)	China	Dunedin Ice Stadium; Attendance: 150

Game reference

Richard Albrecht
Goalies
Sun Zehao
Referee:
(Japan) Hideki Yamauchi
Linesmen:
(New Zealand) Braden O'Loughlin
(Australia) Casper Russelhuber

	0–1	20:26 – Zhang Z. (Zuo T.)
	0–2	27:03 – Huang P. (Wu H.)
	0–3	34:17 – Wu H. (Zuo T., Huang P.) (PP)
	0–4	39:00 – Lu H. (Zuo T., Qian J.) (PP)
J. Duenas (B. Arjona, J. Cosio) (PP) – 46:18	1–4
	1–5	46:48 – Liu Q. (Liu Y., Li H.)
	1–6	51:17 – Zuo T. (Lu H., Zhang Z.) (PP)

14 min
Penalties
34 min
6
Shots
37

20 January 2015; 19:00	South Africa	1–5 (0–2, 1–1, 0–2)	New Zealand	Dunedin Ice Stadium; Attendance: 250

Game reference

Marcello Strydom
Goalies
Liam Henare
Referee:
(Australia) Cory Ross
Linesmen:
(United States) Jake Davis
(Japan) Shinobu Kawai

	0–1	6:54 – C. Burns (H. Macharg, B. Roth)
	0–2	11:08 – M. Macharg (B. Roth)
D. Compton (M. Reelan) (PP) – 22:26	1–2
	1–3	36:22 – B. Roth (J. Orr, T. Carson-Pratt)
	1–4	41:32 – J. Orr (J. Hurring, B. Roth) (PP)
	1–5	51:31 – T. Kennedy (J. Hurring, F. Ellis)

8 min
Penalties
26 min
21
Shots
30

21 January 2015; 19:00	Turkey	1–3 (1–1, 0–1, 0–1)	South Africa	Dunedin Ice Stadium; Attendance: 150

Game reference

Muhammed Karagul
Goalies
Marcello Strydom
Referee:
(Poland) Wlodzimierz Marczuk
Linesmen:
(New Zealand) Ryan Cairns
(South Korea) Park Jae Hyung

	0–1	1:25 – K. Thornton (D. Fisher) (PP)
D. Bingol (B. Akay) (SH) – 19:39	1–1
	1–2	39:54 – B. Husselman
	1–3	53:36 – K. Thornton (W. Krotz, D. Compton)

16 min
Penalties
14 min
17
Shots
22

22 January 2015; 15:30	China	6–1 (1–1, 1–0, 4–0)	Turkey	Dunedin Ice Stadium; Attendance: 75

Game reference

Sun Zehao
Goalies
Muhammed Karagul
Referee:
(Australia) Cory Ross
Linesmen:
(United States) Jake Davis
(New Zealand) Braden O'Loughlin

Li H. (Yue X.) – 9:56	1–0
	1–1	19:27 – B. Ustun (F. Faner) (PP)
Liu Y. (Li H., Zhu Z.) - 23:18	2–1
Liu Q. (Liu Y.) – 41:28	3–1
Liu Y. (Zhu Z.) (SH) - 44:59	4–1
Liu Y – 45:38	5–1
Liu Q. (Li H.) (PP) – 58:26	6–1

41 min
Penalties
24 min
41
Shots
10

22 January 2015; 19:00	New Zealand	2–3 GWS (0–0, 2–2, 0–0) (OT 0–0) (SO: 1–2)	Mexico	Dunedin Ice Stadium; Attendance: 250

Game reference

Liam Henare
Goalies
Jaime Perez
Referee:
(Poland) Wlodzimierz Marczuk
Linesmen:
(South Korea) Park Jae Hyung
(Australia) Casper Russelhuber

	0–1	22:47 – M. Navarro (F. Alva)
L. Frear (J. Hurring) (PP2) – 22:47	1–1
	1–2	28:48 – G. Martinez (J. Duenas)
J. Orr (B. Roth) – 34:39	2–2

F. Ellis
C. Burns (miss)
H. Macharg (miss)
F. Ellis (miss)
Shootout
(miss) B. Arjona
G. Martinez
(miss) N. Dunn
J. Perez
14 min
Penalties
20 min
35
Shots
23

23 January 2015; 19:00	South Africa	0–13 (0–5, 0–2, 0–6)	China	Dunedin Ice Stadium; Attendance: 120

Game reference

Aslam Khan
Marcello Strydom
Goalies
Han Wang
Referee:
(Japan) Hideki Yamauchi
Linesmen:
(New Zealand) Ryan Cairns
(South Korea) Park Jae Hyung

0–1	00:45 – Li H.
0–2	06:30 – Zhang Z. (Zuo T., Wu J.)
0–3	12:19 – Liu Q. (Li H.)
0–4	14:21 – Liu Q.
0–5	16:38 – Li H. (Zhu Z.)
0–6	23:47 – Zhang P. (SH)
0–7	34:05 – Li H. (Wu J.)
0–8	43:59 – Liu Q. (Liang W.)
0–9	45:02 – Wu H. (Zhang P.)
0–10	50:07 – Zhu Z. (Liang W.) (PP)
0–11	53:55 – Yu M. (Qian J.) (PP)
0–12	55:25 – Zhang P. (Liang W.)
0–13	57:10 – Huang P.

12 min
Penalties
73 min
13
Shots
53

24 January 2015; 15:30	Mexico	3–0 (1–0, 0–0, 2–0)	South Africa	Dunedin Ice Stadium; Attendance: 75

Game reference

Jaime Perez
Goalies
Marcello Strydom
Referee:
(Australia) Cory Ross
Linesmen:
(Japan) Shinobu Kawai
(New Zealand) Braden O'Loughlin

G. Martinez (M. Navarro, A. Garcia) (PP) – 16:36	1–0
J. Duenas (D. Barron) (ENG) – 59:14	2–0
A. Bolanos (G. Martinez) – 59:59	3–0

12 min
Penalties
4 min
29
Shots
19

24 January 2015; 19:00	New Zealand	5–3 (2–1, 0–2, 3–0)	Turkey	Dunedin Ice Stadium; Attendance: 250

Game reference

Hunter Waugh
Liam Henare
Goalies
Muhammed Karagul
Referee:
(Japan) Hideki Yamauchi
Linesmen:
(United States) Jake Davis
(Australia) Casper Russelhuber

F. Ellis (H. MacHarg) (PP) – 02:46	1–0
L. Frear (J. Hurring) (PP) – 12:12	2–0
	2–1	17:13 – H. Secer (S. Kavaz, S. Takar) (PP)
	2–2	27:39 – E. Savas
	2–3	33:55 – S. Takar (O. Kars)
C. Burns (H. MacHarg) – 41:34	3–3
B. Roth (F. Ellis) (PP) – 46:06	4–3
T. Kennedy – 47:14	5–3

16 min
Penalties
30 min
43
Shots
28

25 January 2015; 15:30	Turkey	2–1 (1–0, 1–0, 0–1)	Mexico	Dunedin Ice Stadium; Attendance: 60

Game reference

Berk Akin
Goalies
Richard Albrecht
Referee:
(Japan) Hideki Yamauchi
Linesmen:
(New Zealand) Ryan Cairns
(South Korea) Park Jae Hyung

F. Faner (B. Akay, O. Uzunali) (PP) – 10:45	1–0
F. Faner (A. Hars) – 34:50	2–0
	2–1	55:07 – A. Garcia (G. Martinez) (EA)

14 min
Penalties
20 min
28
Shots
35

25 January 2015; 19:00	China	4–1 (1–0, 2–1, 1–0)	New Zealand	Dunedin Ice Stadium; Attendance: 400

Game reference

Wang Han
Goalies
Liam Henare
Referee:
(Poland) Wlodzimierz Marczuk
Linesmen:
(United States) Jake Davis
(Japan) Shinobu Kawai

Lu H. (Zhang Z., Zuo T.) – 03:20	1–0
Zhang Z. (Zuo T.) – 20:17	2–0
	2–1	26:32 – F. Ellis (M. Kennedy, M. Macharg) (PP)
Liu Q. (Zhu Z.) – 30:04	3–1
Liu Q. (Zhu Z.) (PP) – 44:27	4–1

74 min
Penalties
33 min
40
Shots
37
