= Turkey men's national junior ice hockey team =

Turkey
- The crescent moon and a star as seen on the Turkish flag is the badge used on the players jerseys.
- Association: Turkish Ice Hockey Federation
- Head coach: (Turkey) Yucel Citak
- Assistants: (Turkey) Cengiz Akyildiz (Turkey) Caner Baykan
- Captain: Hakan Salt
- Most points: Serkan Gumus (36)
- Team colors
- IIHF code: TUR

First international
- Netherlands 32 – 1 Turkey (Lithuania; December 30, 1997)

Biggest win
- Turkey 28 – 3 Armenia (Elektrenai, Lithuania; January 8, 2006)

Biggest defeat
- Netherlands 37 – 0 Turkey (Novi Sad, Yugoslavia; December 29, 1999)

IIHF World U20 Championship
- Appearances: 20 (first in 1998)
- Best result: 34th (1998, 2018)

International record (W–L–T)
- 33–61–2

The Turkey men's national under 20 ice hockey team is the national under-20 ice hockey team of Turkey. The team is controlled by the Turkish Ice Hockey Federation, a member of the International Ice Hockey Federation. They first played at the World Junior Championship in 1998, mainly staying at the Division III level.

== History ==
Turkey played its first game in 1997 against the Netherlands during the Pool D tournament of the 1998 IIHF World U20 Championship, losing the game 32–1. The following year, Turkey again competed in the Pool D tournament of the IIHF World U20 Championships. Turkey lost all four of their games including the one against the Netherlands which they lost 37–0, which was recorded as their worst ever defeat in international competition.

In 2003, Turkey returned from a three-year absence to compete in the Division III tournament at the 2003 IIHF World U20 Championship. They won their first game ever in their first game back, defeating Luxembourg 14–1. In 2006, Turkey recorded their largest ever win in international competition after defeating Armenia 28–3 during the 2006 IIHF World U20 Championship Division III tournament. Turkey continued to compete in Division III of the IIHF World U20 Championships until 2009, where they did not participate in that year's tournament.

In 2010, Turkey returned to the World U20 Championships and hosted the Division III tournament in Istanbul. In 2012, they finished fifth in the Division III tournament being held in Dunedin, New Zealand.

== International competitions ==
=== World Junior Ice Hockey Championships ===
Year	Host country	Div.	GP	W	L	T	GF	GA	Pts	TR	WR
1998	Lithuania	D - A	4	0	4	0	5	67	0	8th	34th
1999	Yugoslavia	D - B	4	0	4	0	1	93	0	9th	▼35th
2003	Turkey	III	4	2	0	2	26	16	4	3rd	▼37th
2004	Bulgaria	III	5	1	4	0	10	38	2	4th	▼38th
2005	Mexico	III	5	1	4	0	10	27	2	5th	▼39th
2006	Lithuania	III	4	2	2	0	35	40	4	3rd	▲37th
2007	Turkey	III	5	1	4	–	9	31	3	5th	▼39th
2008	Serbia	III	6	1	5	–	18	62	3	6th	▼40th
2010	Turkey	III - B	5	1	4	–	20	36	3	6th	40th
2011	Mexico	III	6	3	3	–	36	33	9	4th	▲38th
2012	New Zealand	III	4	0	4	–	1	38	0	5th	▼39th
2013	Bulgaria	III	5	1	4	–	19	24	3	5th	39th
2014	Turkey	III	5	2	3	–	10	24	7	4th	▲38th
2015	New Zealand	III	4	1	3	–	7	15	3	5th	▼39th
2016	Mexico	III	6	2	4	–	20	15	6	6th	▼40th
2017	New Zealand	III	5	5	0	–	25	8	9	1st	▲35th
2018	Serbia	IIB	5	1	4	–	13	30	3	6th	▼34th
2019	Iceland	III	5	3	2	–	17	20	6	3rd	▼37th
2020	Bulgaria	III	5	3	2	–	17	11	6	3rd	37th
2022	Mexico	III	5	3	2	–	22	20	9	5th	▼39th
2023	Turkey	IIIA	6	2	4	–	25	29	3	4th	▲38th
2024	Bulgaria	IIIA	5	2	3	–	15	19	6	4th	38th
2025	Turkey	IIIA	5	2	3	–	27	31	6	4th	38th
2026	Bulgaria	IIIA	5	3	2	–	34	15	8	4th	38th
Total			118	42	74	2	320	742	99		
