= Peter Huba =

Slovak ice hockey player

- Born: February 17, 1986 (age 39); Topoľčany, Czechoslovakia
- Height: 6 ft 0 in (183 cm)
- Weight: 198 lb (90 kg; 14 st 2 lb)
- Position: Defence
- Shoots: Left
- Erste Liga team Former teams: Újpesti TE; HC Slovan Bratislava; HKm Zvolen; HC Košice; HC '05 Banská Bystrica; Dunaújvárosi Acélbikák; HC Nové Zámky
- Playing career: 2004–present

Peter Huba (born February 17, 1986) is a Slovak professional ice hockey player who currently plays for Újpesti TE of the Erste Liga.

Huba played in the Slovak Extraliga for HC Slovan Bratislava, HKm Zvolen, HC Košice and HC '05 Banská Bystrica.

== Career statistics ==
			Regular season					Playoffs
Season	Team	League	GP	G	A	Pts	PIM	GP	G	A	Pts	PIM
2003–04	HC Topolcany U18	Slovak U18	9	1	4	5	8	—	—	—	—	—
2003–04	HC Topolcany U20	Slovak U20	22	3	4	7	16	—	—	—	—	—
2003–04	HC VTJ Telvis Topoľčany	Slovak2	4	1	0	1	2	1	0	0	0	0
2004–05	HC Topolcany U20	Slovak U20	40	10	15	25	71	—	—	—	—	—
2004–05	HC VTJ Telvis Topoľčany	Slovak2	34	1	4	5	30	10	1	0	1	6
2005–06	HC VTJ Telvis Topoľčany	Slovak2	35	4	13	17	63	13	1	1	2	16
2006–07	HC Slovan Bratislava	Slovak	31	0	3	3	24	14	1	1	2	4
2006–07	HK Ružinov	Slovak2	5	1	3	4	2	—	—	—	—	—
2007–08	HC Slovan Bratislava	Slovak	44	0	1	1	16	18	0	0	0	0
2007–08	HK Ružinov	Slovak2	4	0	0	0	14	—	—	—	—	—
2008–09	HC Slovan Bratislava	Slovak	19	0	1	1	8	—	—	—	—	—
2008–09	HK Ružinov	Slovak2	6	0	2	2	4	—	—	—	—	—
2008–09	HKM Zvolen	Slovak	25	3	2	5	18	13	1	1	2	18
2009–10	HC Slovan Bratislava	Slovak	2	0	0	0	0	—	—	—	—	—
2009–10	HKM Zvolen	Slovak	16	1	1	2	12	—	—	—	—	—
2009–10	HKm Detva	Slovak2	3	0	1	1	2	—	—	—	—	—
2009–10	HC Košice	Slovak	14	0	2	2	16	14	0	1	1	4
2010–11	HC Košice	Slovak	49	3	5	8	26	4	0	0	0	2
2011–12	HC Košice	Slovak	3	0	0	0	6	—	—	—	—	—
2011–12	HC 46 Bardejov	Slovak2	4	1	0	1	6	—	—	—	—	—
2011–12	HC Banska Bystrica	Slovak	37	1	2	3	18	1	0	0	0	0
2012–13	HC Topolcany	Slovak2	20	1	11	12	16	—	—	—	—	—
2012–13	Dunaújvárosi Acélbikák	MOL Liga	18	1	7	8	12	—	—	—	—	—
2013–14	Dunaújvárosi Acélbikák	MOL Liga	46	4	15	19	54	4	0	0	0	2
2014–15	HC Nove Zamky	MOL Liga	41	4	15	19	30	9	0	3	3	10
2014–15	HC Nove Zamky	Slovak3	18	1	9	10	4	—	—	—	—	—
2015–16	Újpesti TE	MOL Liga	48	7	12	19	63	3	0	0	0	4
2016–17	Újpesti TE	MOL Liga	38	4	21	25	46	8	1	5	6	6
2017–18	Újpesti TE	Erste Liga	37	2	20	22	48	6	0	6	6	6
2018–19	Újpesti TE	Erste Liga	38	5	16	21	78	10	4	1	5	22
2019–20	HC Topolcany	Slovak2	37	2	10	12	30	—	—	—	—	—
Slovak totals			240	8	17	25	144	64	2	3	5	28
Slovak2 totals			152	11	44	55	171	26	3	2	5	24
MOL Liga totals			266	27	106	133	331	40	5	15	20	50
