= 2009–10 MOL Liga season =

2009–10 MOL Season
- League: MOL Liga
- Sport: Ice hockey

MOL Liga seasons
- ← 2008–09 2010-11 →

The 2009–10 MOL Liga season was the second season played, of this international ice hockey. Teams from Hungary and Romania participated. The total number of teams had gone down from the first season. Alba Volan's farm team left, and three Romanian teams left, while one Romanian team joined.

== Teams ==
- (Hungary) Ferencvárosi TC
- (Hungary) Dunaújvárosi Acélbikák
- (Hungary) Vasas Budapest Stars
- (Hungary) Újpest TE
- (Hungary) Miskolci JJSE
- (Romania) SC Miercurea Ciuc
- (Romania) SCM Fenestala Brasov 68

== Standings ==
| Pl. | | Sp | W | OTW | OTL | L | Goals | Pts |
| 1. | (Hungary) Dunaújvárosi Acélbikák | 24 | 21 | 1 | 1 | 1 | 133:50 | 66 |
| 2. | (Romania) SC Miercurea Ciuc | 24 | 14 | 0 | 1 | 9 | 82:70 | 43 |
| 3. | (Hungary) Újpesti TE | 24 | 12 | 1 | 1 | 10 | 102:99 | 39 |
| 4. | (Hungary) Budapest Stars | 24 | 11 | 2 | 2 | 9 | 61:63 | 39 |
| 5. | (Hungary) Ferencvárosi TC | 24 | 8 | 3 | 2 | 11 | 86:90 | 32 |
| 6. | (Hungary) Miskolci Jegesmedvék JSE | 24 | 4 | 2 | 3 | 15 | 73:102 | 19 |
| 7. | (Romania) SCM 68 Fenestela Brașov | 24 | 3 | 2 | 1 | 18 | 71:134 | 14 |

== Playoffs ==
Semifinals
1. | (Hungary) Dunaújvárosi Acélbikák | 2
4. | (Hungary) Budapest Stars | 3
2. | (Romania) SC Miercurea Ciuc | 3
3. | (Hungary) Újpesti TE | 4

Final
4. | (Hungary) Budapest Stars | 3
3. | (Hungary) Újpesti TE | 1
Third place
4. | (Hungary) Budapest Stars | 3
3. | (Hungary) Újpesti TE | 1
