= 2012–13 OB I bajnoksag season =

Hungarian ice hockey season

The 2012–13 OB I bajnoksag season is the 76th season of the OB I bajnoksag, the top level of ice hockey in Hungary. The league proper was not contested this season, as four of the top Hungarian teams competed in the multi-national MOL Liga. The top-ranked Hungarian team in the league was crowned national champions. Dab.Docler, who won the MOL Liga, was recognized as Hungarian champion this year.

Alba Volán Székesfehérvár, who played in the Austrian Hockey League, and was the Hungarian champion for ten straight years, was unable to participate in the Hungarian Championship, as they were required to enter their second team in the Erste Bank Junior League. They did not directly inform the Hungarian Ice Hockey Federation of their decision. However, the club still participated in the Hungarian Cup.

== Teams ==
Club	City	Arena	Capacity	Founded
Dab.Docler	Dunaújváros	Dunaújvárosi Jégcsarnok	4000	1977
Ferencvárosi TC	Budapest	Pesterzsébeti Jégcsarnok	1500	1928
Miskolci Jegesmedvék JSE	Miskolc	Miskolci Jégcsarnok	1300	1978
Újpesti TE	Budapest	Újpesti Jégcsarnok	1300	1955
