= 2010–11 MOL Liga season =

2010–11 MOL Season
- League: MOL Liga
- Sport: Ice hockey
- Duration: 7 September 2010 – 22 January 2011
- Number of teams: 9
- Finals champions: HSC Csíkszereda
- Runners-up: Dunaújvárosi Acélbikák

MOL Liga seasons
- ← 2009–10 2011–12 →

The 2010–11 MOL Liga season was the third edition of the international ice hockey championship for teams from Hungary and Romania. This season nine teams participated, including defending champions Vasas Budapest Stars, the second team of Erste Bank Eishockey Liga outfit SAPA AV19 Székesfehérvár and HSC Csíkszereda from Szekler Land.

== Teams ==
Team	City/Area	Arena	Capacity	Founded
Dunaújvárosi Acélbikák	(Hungary) Dunaújváros	Dunaújvárosi Jégcsarnok	4,000	2006
FTC-Orangeways	(Hungary) Budapest	Pesterzsébeti Jégcsarnok	1,500	1928
Miskolci JJSE	(Hungary) Miskolc	Miskolci Jégcsarnok	1,300	1978
SAPA AV19 Székesfehérvár II	(Hungary) Székesfehérvár	Ifjabb Ocskay Gábor Ice Hall	3,600	1960
Újpesti TE	(Hungary) Budapest	Újpesti Jégcsarnok	1,300	1955
Vasas HC	(Hungary) Budapest	IceCenter (Jégcentrum)	2,000	2001
HSC Csíkszereda	(Romania) Miercurea-Ciuc	Vákár Lajos Ice Hall	2,000	1929
SCM Fenestela Braşov	(Romania) Braşov	Braşov Olympic Ice Hall	2,000	2007
Steaua Rangers	(Romania) Bucharest	Patinoarul Mihai Flamaropol	8,000	1951

== Regular season ==
=== Standings ===
Club	GP	W	OTW	SOW	SOL	OTL	L	GF	GA	GD	Pts
HSC Csíkszereda	32	21	3	1	0	1	6	161	73	+88	72
Dunaújvárosi Acélbikák	32	22	1	0	1	1	7	170	85	+85	70
Miskolci JJSE	32	19	3	0	2	1	7	163	96	+67	66
Vasas HC	32	19	0	2	0	2	9	136	75	+61	63
FTC-Orangeways	32	16	0	1	1	1	13	128	117	+11	52
SCM Fenestela Braşov	32	14	0	0	3	1	14	116	103	+13	46
SAPA AV19 Székesfehérvár II	32	8	1	3	0	0	20	97	148	–51	32
Steaua Rangers	32	8	0	1	1	1	21	91	161	–70	28
Újpesti TE	32	1	0	0	0	0	31	68	272	–204	3

Last updated on 16 December 2010.

=== Individual statistics ===
==== Scoring leaders ====
The following players led the league in points at the conclusion of the regular season.

Player	Team	GP	G	A	Pts	+/–	PIM
Joshua Bonar	Miskolci JJSE	31	29	30	59	+25	115
Martin Saluga	Miskolci JJSE	32	24	33	57	+27	10
Václav Novák	HSC Csíkszereda	29	24	28	52	+26	58
Vladimír Ďubek	Miskolci JJSE	32	21	29	50	+17	16
Ľubomír Hurtaj	HSC Csíkszereda	26	20	28	48	+32	46
Tyler Metcalfe	Dunaújvárosi Acélbikák	29	24	22	46	+34	38
Kurt MacSweyn	Dunaújvárosi Acélbikák	31	16	29	45	+35	50
Casey Bartzen	Miskolci JJSE	25	12	33	45	+16	48
Ladislav Sikorcin	HSC Csíkszereda	29	21	23	44	+30	26
Nikandrosz Galanisz	Dunaújvárosi Acélbikák	30	17	26	43	+19	53

==== Leading goaltenders ====
The following goaltenders led the league in save percentage at the end of the regular season.

Player	Team	GP	TOI	SOG	SVS	GA	SVS%	GAA
Miklós Rajna	Vasas HC	20	1,098:28	663	622	41	.938	2.23
Tamás Kiss	Vasas HC	15	776:41	526	492	34	.935	2.62
Peter Ševela	Dunaújvárosi Acélbikák	12	631:14	388	361	27	.930	2.56
Timo Lindström	Dunaújvárosi Acélbikák	13	691:38	397	367	30	.924	2.60
Patrik Polc	SCM Fenestela Braşov	31	1,652:18	1206	1113	93	.923	3.37
Dávid Duschek	Miskolci JJSE	17	900:35	509	467	42	.917	2.79
Stanislav Kožuch	HSC Csíkszereda	30	1,690:02	715	654	61	.915	2.16
Krisztián Budai	FTC-Orangeways	19	1,032:45	648	590	58	.910	3.36
Dávid Gyenes	Miskolci JJSE	19	1,036:55	584	531	53	.909	3.06
Bence Bálizs	SAPA AV19 Székesfehérvár II	25	1,430:50	1106	1002	104	.906	4.36

== Playoffs ==
After the regular season the seven best placed teams qualified automatically for the playoffs, while the eighth and ninth placed teams decided the one remaining playoff place in a best-of-three series. The teams are drawn together according to their final result in the regular season.

=== Pre-qualifying ===
All times are local (UTC+1).

14 December 2010; 18:00	Steaua Rangers	5–6 ( 2–2, 2–1, 1–3 )	Újpesti TE	Patinoarul Mihai Flamaropol, Bucharest; Attendance: 50

Game reference

Adrian Catrinoi Cornea
Goalies
Márk Hajek
Referees:
Lehel Gergely
Istvan Mathe

	0–1	3:04 – P. Németh
M. Georgescu (V. Nicolescu) – 05:53	1–1
C. Flueras (R. Lupascu) – 09:01	2–1
	2–2	10:46 – P. Szajbert
	2–3	23:51 – P. Szajbert (B. Zalavári) (PP)
M. Marcus (M. Georgescu, T. Predoi) – 36:27	3–3
V. Nicolescu (Zs. Mastaleriu, I. Timaru) – 36:52	4–3
	4–4	43:41 – T. Rosztocsil (PS)
	4–5	50:23 – Zs. Gergely (B. Kukucska, B. Rusznyák)
I. Timaru (SH) – 53:23	5–5
	5–6	59:10 – D. Roczanov

4 min
Penalties
10 min
25
Shots
29

15 December 2010; 14:00	Steaua Rangers	1–7 ( 0–3, 0–2, 1–2 )	Újpesti TE	Patinoarul Mihai Flamaropol, Bucharest; Attendance: 50

Game reference

Lorand Kari
Goalies
Attila Norbert Szőke
Referees:
Eduard Popescu
Alexandru Butucel

	0–1	10:39 – P. Németh (A. Tolnai, R. Davis)
	0–2	14:27 – Zs. Gergely (P. Szajbert, D. Roczanov)
	0–3	19:29 – A. Tolnai (B. Rusznyák, D. Roczanov)
	0–4	25:26 – D. Roczanov (P. Szajbert)
	0–5	25:46 – B. Rusznyák (R. Davis))
	0–6	40:55 – R. Davis (P. Németh) (PP2)
	0–7	43:42 – R. Davis (P. Németh, D. Roczanov)
V. Nicolescu (I. Timaru) (SH) – 56:06	1–7

18 min
Penalties
10 min
18
Shots
44

Újpesti TE have won the series to 2–0 and thus qualified for the playoffs.

=== Playoff bracket ===
Quarter Final
HSC Csíkszereda	3
Újpesti TE	0
Vasas HC	3
FTC-Orangeways	0
Miskolci JJSE	3
SCM Fenestela Braşov	1
Dunaújvárosi Acélbikák	3
SAPA AV19 II Sz'fehérvár	0

Semi Final
HSC Csíkszereda	3
Vasas HC	1
Miskolci JJSE	0
Dunaújvárosi Acélbikák	3

Final
HSC Csíkszereda	4
Dunaújvárosi Acélbikák	1

HSC Csíkszereda have won the best-of-seven series final to 4–1 and took the MOL Liga title.
