= Miroslav Štefanka =

Slovak ice hockey player

- Born: September 23, 1973 (age 51); Nitra, Czechoslovakia
- Height: 6 ft 2 in (188 cm)
- Weight: 192 lb (87 kg; 13 st 10 lb)
- Position: Center
- Shot: Left
- Played for: HK Nitra; HK Trnava; MHC Prievidza; HC Slovan Bratislava; HC Bílí Tygři Liberec; HK SKP Poprad; Halla Winia; HC Csíkszereda; HC Nové Zámky
- National team: Slovakia
- Playing career: 1993–2015

Miroslav Štefanka (born September 23, 1973) is a Slovak professional ice hockey player who played with HC Slovan Bratislava in the Slovak Extraliga.

== Career statistics ==
			Regular season					Playoffs
Season	Team	League	GP	G	A	Pts	PIM	GP	G	A	Pts	PIM
1993–94	HC Nitra	Slovak	17	1	1	2	2	—	—	—	—	—
1995–96	HC Nitra	Slovak	28	4	4	8	6	—	—	—	—	—
1996–97	HC Nitra	Slovak	29	4	5	9	2	—	—	—	—	—
1996–97	HK Trnava	Slovak2	17	9	12	21	4	—	—	—	—	—
1997–98	MHC Prievidza	Slovak2	42	9	10	19	6	—	—	—	—	—
1998–99	HK Trnava	Slovak2	22	7	4	11	4	—	—	—	—	—
1999–00	HC Slovan Bratislava	Slovak	18	1	3	4	2	—	—	—	—	—
1999–00	HC Slovan Bratislava B	Slovak2	30	18	30	48	8	—	—	—	—	—
2000–01	HKm Nitra	Slovak2	37	14	25	39	10	—	—	—	—	—
2001–02	Bili Tygri Liberec	Czech2	7	0	0	0	0	—	—	—	—	—
2001–02	HKm Nitra	Slovak	23	10	13	23	2	—	—	—	—	—
2002–03	HC Slovan Bratislava	Slovak	10	1	2	3	2	—	—	—	—	—
2002–03	HK SKP Poprad	Slovak	32	7	10	17	6	—	—	—	—	—
2003–04	HK SKP Poprad	Slovak	9	0	1	1	0	—	—	—	—	—
2003–04	Halla Winia	Asia League	16	5	9	14	4	—	—	—	—	—
2004–05	HKm Nitra	Slovak	53	9	25	34	14	5	1	2	3	0
2005–06	HK Nitra	Slovak	54	10	16	26	16	13	2	1	3	8
2006–07	HK Nitra	Slovak	49	14	18	32	26	6	1	3	4	0
2007–08	HK Nitra	Slovak	43	13	19	32	30	—	—	—	—	—
2008–09	HC Csíkszereda	MOL Liga	28	4	20	24	18	—	—	—	—	—
2009–10	HK Nitra	Slovak	41	3	11	14	18	10	0	3	3	4
2010–11	HK Nitra	Slovak	56	17	39	56	34	5	0	0	0	4
2011–12	HK Nitra	Slovak	45	13	19	32	32	—	—	—	—	—
2012–13	HC Nové Zámky	MOL Liga	48	13	39	52	40	3	0	1	1	0
2012–13	HC Nové Zámky	Slovak3	1	0	0	0	0	—	—	—	—	—
2013–14	HC Nové Zámky	MOL Liga	27	3	18	21	18	6	2	2	4	2
2014–15	HC Nové Zámky	MOL Liga	24	5	13	18	4	11	1	2	3	4
2014–15	HC Nové Zámky	Slovak3	10	2	7	9	10	—	—	—	—	—
Slovak totals			507	107	186	293	192	39	4	9	13	16
