= 2011–12 MOL Liga season =

2011–12 MOL Season
- League: MOL Liga
- Sport: Ice hockey
- Duration: 6 September 2011 – 20 February 2012
- Number of teams: 8
- Regular season winners: HSC Csíkszereda
- Champions: Dunaújvárosi Acélbikák

MOL Liga seasons
- ← 2010–11 2012–13 →

The 2011–12 MOL Liga season is the fourth edition of the international ice hockey championship for teams from Hungary and Romania. Following the withdrawal of Vasas HC, the field is composed of eight clubs this season, including five Hungarian and three Romanian. The regular season ran from 6 September 2011 to 20 January 2012.

After the conclusion of the regular season the six best ranked teams won the right to participate in the playoffs. Top two clubs had bye in the first round of the playoffs, while the remaining four teams were drawn together according to their final position in the regular season (3–6, 4–5). The winners of the match-ups advanced to the semifinals, where they met Dunaújvárosi Acélbikák and HSC Csíkszereda, respectively.

Eventually, Miskolci JJSE beat HSC Csíkszereda and thus secured their spot in the finals, where they faced Dunaújváros, which won their duel in straight matches against Corona Fenestela Braşov.

Dunaújváros enjoyed the home court advantage in the best-of-seven series final, where they swept away Miskolc with 4–0 and took the 2011–12 MOL Liga title, the first ever of its kind in the history of the club.

== Teams ==
Team	City/Area	Arena	Capacity	Founded
Dunaújvárosi Acélbikák	(Hungary) Dunaújváros	Dunaújvárosi Jégcsarnok	4,000	2006
Ferencvárosi TC	(Hungary) Budapest	Pesterzsébeti Jégcsarnok	1,500	1928
Miskolci JJSE	(Hungary) Miskolc	Miskolci Jégcsarnok	1,300	1978
SAPA AV19 Székesfehérvár II	(Hungary) Székesfehérvár	Ifjabb Ocskay Gábor Ice Hall	3,600	1960
Újpesti TE	(Hungary) Budapest	Újpesti Jégcsarnok	1,300	1955
HSC Csíkszereda	(Romania) Miercurea Ciuc	Vákár Lajos Ice Hall	2,000	1929
Corona Fenestela Braşov	(Romania) Braşov	Braşov Olympic Ice Hall	2,000	2007
Steaua Rangers	(Romania) Bucharest	Patinoarul Mihai Flamaropol	8,000	1951

== Regular season ==
=== Standings ===
Club	GP	W	OTW	SOW	SOL	OTL	L	GF	GA	GD	Pts
HSC Csíkszereda	35	24	1	1	4	0	4	169	76	+93	83
Dunaújvárosi Acélbikák	35	24	2	3	1	0	5	154	72	+82	83
Corona Fenestela Braşov	35	18	0	1	0	3	13	147	116	+31	59
Miskolci JJSE	35	16	1	1	2	0	15	131	102	+29	54
Ferencvárosi TC	35	14	2	0	0	1	18	119	137	–18	47
Steaua Rangers	35	13	1	1	2	2	16	124	160	–36	47
SAPA AV19 Székesfehérvár II	35	10	0	3	0	1	21	118	167	–49	37
Újpesti TE	35	3	0	0	1	0	31	82	214	–132	10

=== Individual statistics ===
==== Scoring leaders ====
The following players led the league in points at the end of the regular season.

GP = Games played; G = Goals; A = Assists; Pts = Points; +/– = Plus/minus; PIM = Penalty minutes

Player	Team	GP	G	A	Pts	+/–	PIM
Vaclav Novak	HSC Csíkszereda	35	28	32	60	+50	16
Martin Saluga	Miskolci JJSE	35	21	31	52	+13	50
Szabolcs Fodor	Miskolci JJSE	35	20	29	49	+11	64
Ioan Timaru	Steaua Rangers	35	20	28	48	+8	30
Vladimir Dubek	Miskolci JJSE	35	18	30	48	+12	12
Attila Borsos	Corona Fenestela Braşov	34	21	26	47	+12	10
Milán Varga	Corona Fenestela Braşov	32	19	23	42	+14	92
Roland Hajós	SAPA AV19 Székesfehérvár II	35	12	30	42	–24	12
Tihamér Becze	HSC Csíkszereda	34	27	12	39	+30	69
Casey Bartzen	Corona Fenestela Braşov	22	9	30	39	+14	42

==== Leading goaltenders ====
The following goaltenders led the league in save percentage at the conclusion of the regular season. Only goaltenders who played at least 40% of the team's minutes are listed.

GP = Games played; TOI = Time on ice (minutes); SOG = Shots on Goal; SVS =Saved Shots; GA = Goals against; SVS% = Saving percentage; GAA = Goals against average

Player	Team	GP	TOI	SOG	SVS	GA	SVS%	GAA
Stanislav Kozuch	HSC Csíkszereda	25	1,357:54	664	622	42	.937	1.85
Peter Sevela	Dunaújvárosi Acélbikák	19	944:55	490	458	32	.935	2.03
Patrik Polc	Corona Fenestela Braşov	24	1,386:44	950	884	66	.931	2.85
Krisztián Budai	Miskolci JJSE	27	1628:35	989	909	80	.919	2.94
Jozef Racko	Ferencvárosi TC	35	2,035:37	1259	1126	133	.894	3.92
József Pleszkán	SAPA AV19 Székesfehérvár II	28	1,560:08	1027	907	102	.883	4.61
Adrian Catrinoi	Steaua Rangers	32	1,834:03	1169	1027	142	.879	4.64
Attila Szőke	Újpesti TE	26	1,370:06	1054	919	135	.872	5.91

== Playoffs ==
=== Bracket ===
Quarterfinals
Miskolci JJSE	2
Ferencvárosi TC	0
Corona Fenestela Braşov	2
Steaua Rangers	0

Semifinals
Miskolci JJSE	3
HSC Csíkszereda	2
Dunaújvárosi Acélbikák	3
Corona Fenestela Braşov	0

Finals
Miskolci JJSE	0
Dunaújvárosi Acélbikák	4
