= 2016–17 MOL Liga season =

2016–17 MOL Liga
- League: MOL Liga
- Sport: Ice hockey
- Teams: 11
- TV partner: M4 Sport

Regular season
- League Champion: DVTK Jegesmedvék
- Season MVP: (Canada) Keegan Dansereau (Dunaújvárosi Acélbikák)

Playoffs
- Finals champions: DVTK Jegesmedvék (3rd title)
- Runners-up: MAC Budapest
- Finals MVP: (United States) Jon Booras (MAC Budapest)

MOL Liga seasons
- ← 2015–16 2017–18 →

The 2016–17 MOL Liga is a season of the MOL Liga. DVTK Jegesmedvék is the two-time defending champion after defeating MAC Budapest in the 2015-2016 season. A new team, the Serbian based HK Beograd joined the league.

== Team information ==
Team	City	Arena	Capacity
HK Beograd	(Serbia) Belgrade	Ledena Dvorana Pionir	2,000
ASC Corona Brașov	(Romania) Brașov	Patinoarul Olimpic Brașov	1,604
HSC Csíkszereda	(Romania) Miercurea Ciuc	Patinoarul Vákár Lájos	3,500
Dunaújvárosi Acélbikák	(Hungary) Dunaújváros	Dunaújvárosi Jégcsarnok	4,500
CSM Dunărea Galați	(Romania) Galați	Patinoarul Dunărea	4,000
Debreceni HK	(Hungary) Debrecen	Debreceni Jégcsarnok	590
DVTK Jegesmedvék	(Hungary) Miskolc	Miskolci Jégcsarnok	2,200
Fehérvári Titánok (II.)	(Hungary) Székesfehérvár	Ifj. Ocskay Gábor Jégcsarnok	3,600
Ferencvárosi TC	(Hungary) Budapest	Pesterzsébeti Jégcsarnok	2,400
MAC Budapest	(Hungary) Budapest	Tüskecsarnok	2,540
Újpesti TE	(Hungary) Budapest	Megyeri úti Jégcsarnok	2,000

== Regular season ==
Pos	Team	Pld	W	OTW	OTL	L	GF	GA	GD	Pts	Qualification
1	DVTK Jegesmedvék	40	29	3	2	6	187	87	+100	95	Qualification to Playoffs
2	MAC Budapest	40	28	2	3	7	189	90	+99	91	Qualification to Playoffs
3	UTE	40	23	3	2	12	147	107	+40	77	Qualification to Playoffs
4	Debreceni HK	40	20	3	3	14	166	127	+39	69	Qualification to Playoffs
5	ASC Corona Brașov	40	18	6	1	15	142	125	+17	67	Qualification to Playoffs
6	Dunaújvárosi Acélbikák	40	18	3	6	13	154	131	+23	66	Qualification to Playoffs
7	Ferencvárosi TC	40	14	0	6	20	138	170	−32	48	Qualification to Playoffs
8	Fehérvári Titánok	40	6	9	8	17	112	150	−38	44	Qualification to Playoffs
9	Dunărea Galați	40	8	6	3	23	110	202	−92	39	
10	HK Beograd	40	9	2	2	27	107	182	−75	33	
11	Sport Club Csíkszereda	40	8	2	3	27	98	179	−81	31	

Updated to match(es) played on 5 February 2017. Source: MJSZ
Rules for classification: 1) points; 2) head-to-head points; 3) head-to-head goal difference; 4) head-to-head number of goals scored.

=== Results ===
Home team	Away team										
Home team	Beograd	Corona B.	SC Csík.	Acélbikák	Dunărea	Debrecen	DVTK	Fehérvár	FTC	MAC	UTE
HK Beograd		1:5; 3:1	3:4; 6:3	2:5; 1:4	2:3; 6:2	0:4; 3:7	1:4; 4:6	4:3 (OT); 2:0	4:5; 3:0	3:4; 2:7	2:3; 1:4
ASC Corona Brașov	5:2; 6:2		4:2; 4:2	1:4; 0:5*	6:4; 12:4	5:3; 5:7	0:1; 1:4	2:1 (OT); 2:4	3:5; 4:3	2:1; 0:3	4:1; 5:3
HSC Csíkszereda	4:6; 5:3	4:2; 0:3		2:4; 1:3	5:2; 1:2	1:4; 4:5 (SO)	1:4; 1:6	2:3 (SO); 4:2	2:3; 3:2	3:6; 0:7	1:3; 1:3
Dunaújvárosi Acélbikák	4:3 (SO); 8:3	3:6; 3:4 (OT)	10:4; 6:3		4:2; 6:7 (OT)	4:0; 3:4 (OT)	2:3; 2:5	5:2; 2:1	8:1; 5:4 (OT)	6:5; 6:3	1:3; 2:4
CSM Dunărea Galați	2:1; 2:6	4:11; 3:5	8:4; 2:3	4:3 (OT); 3:0		2:1; 6:5 (OT)	2:5; 1:4	3:2 (OT); 7:5	2:3; 6:2	1:3; 1:7	3:6; 1:2 (OT)
Debreceni HK	6:0; 5:3	4:5 (OT); 4:2	14:2; 4:1	4:1; 7:8 (OT)	2:1 (OT); 8:0		2:0; 6:8	2:3; 4:3	5:1; 9:5	1:9; 2:4	3:4; 2:1
DVTK Jegesmedvék	3:5; 9:1	7:1; 3:2 (OT)	10:0; 7:2	5:4; 5:2	7:0; 12:1	3:1; 4:2		1:2; 4:0	3:2 (OT); 7:4	2:3 (SO); 4:1	5:3; 2:3 (OT)
Fehérvári Titánok	4:3 (OT); 1:2 (OT)	3:6; 1:5	5:6 (SO); 3:4 (SO)	2:3; 6:5 (OT)	5:6 (OT); 6:5 (OT)	3:2; 2:5	1:2 (OT); 1:7		3:2 (OT); 5:4 (SO)	5:4; 2:4	3:4; 2:1 (OT)
Ferencvárosi TC	10:2; 1:4	3:4 (OT); 6:2	3:4; 4:3	3:2; 2:5	3:0; 9:0	4:7; 3:2	1:6; 5:7	6:7 (SO); 3:4		1:5; 4:8	3:2; 3:2
MAC Budapest	7:2; 8:2	0:1 (SO); 3:4 (SO)	2:1 (SO); 3:1	2:0; 6:2	3:4 (OT); 15:2	5:4; 1:3	4:3; 6:3	6:0; 4:2	2:1; 9:3		3:4; 4:0
Újpesti TE	8:1; 10:3	3:0; 6:2	4:3; 4:1	4:3 (OT); 4:1	4:1; 8:1	3:5; 5:1	5:3; 2:3	5:2; 2:3 (OT)	7:6; 4:5	1:6; 2:6	

Updated to match(es) played on 5 February 2017. Source: MOL Liga

=== Statistics ===
==== Scoring leaders ====
List shows the ten best skaters based on the number of points during the regular season. If two or more skaters are tied (i.e. same number of points, goals and played games), all of the tied skaters are shown.

As of 5 February 2017

GP = Games played; G = Goals; A = Assists; Pts = Points; +/– = Plus/Minus

Player	Team	GP	G	A	Pts	+/–
(Canada) Keegan Dansereau	Dunaújvárosi Acélbikák	39	34	37	71	+24
(Hungary) Zsolt Azari	Dunaújvárosi Acélbikák	40	25	40	65	+15
(Slovakia) Tomas Klempa	ASC Corona Brașov	40	31	31	62	+32
(Canada) Ian McDonald	ASC Corona Brașov	38	26	36	62	+24
(Canada) Jereme Tendler	Ferencvárosi TC	39	34	26	60	+2
(Hungary) Gergő Nagy	MAC Budapest	40	21	37	58	+26

==== Leading goaltenders ====
As of 5 February 2017

GP = Games played; TOI = Time on ice (minutes); GA = Goals against; Sv% = Save percentage; GAA = Goals against average

Player	Team	GP	TOI	GA	Sv%	GAA
(Hungary) Attila Adorján	DVTK Jegesmedvék	32	1870:34	65	92.97	2.08
(Romania) (Hungary) Zoltán-László Tőke	ASC Corona Brașov	35	2008:30	93	92.09	2.77
(Hungary) Gergely Arany	MAC Budapest	17	997:09	38	92.06	2.28
(Hungary) Bence Bálizs	MAC Budapest	24	1397:50	51	92.03	2.18
(Hungary) Dávid Duschek	Dunaújvárosi Acélbikák	31	1846:21	92	91.97	2.98
(Slovenia) Ales Sila	UTE	34	1960:32	86	91.26	2.62

== Playoffs ==
As of 16 March 2017.

Quarterfinals
1	DVTK Jegesmedvék^{†}	4
7	Ferencvárosi TC	3
3	UTE	4
6	Dunaújvárosi Acélbikák	3
(Pairings are reseeded after the first round)
2	MAC Budapest	4
8	Fehérvári Titánok	1
4	Debreceni HK	4
5	ASC Corona Brașov	3

Semifinals
1	DVTK Jegesmedvék^{†}	4
3	UTE	1
2	MAC Budapest	4
4	Debreceni HK	1

Finals
1	DVTK Jegesmedvék^{†}	4
2	MAC Budapest	1

^{†} Defending champion

=== Quarterfinals ===
The quarterfinals were played between 14 and 26 February 2017 in a best-of-seven mode.

Team 1	Series	Team 2	1	2	3	4	5	6	7
DVTK Jegesmedvék	4–3	Ferencvárosi TC	4:5	1:3	6:0	4:1	0:3	3:1	3:0
MAC Budapest	4–1	Fehérvári Titánok	7:1	3:2 (OT)	2:3 (SO)	4:3 (OT)	3:1		
UTE	4–3	Dunaújvárosi Acélbikák	0:1	2:4	9:4	3:2	4:3	4:5 (SO)	3:2 (OT)
Debreceni HK	4–3	ASC Corona Brașov	6:3	2:5	3:2	4:7	6:1	1:3	4:3

=== Semifinals ===
The quarterfinals were played between 28 February and 12 March 2017 in a best-of-seven mode.

Team 1	Series	Team 2	1	2	3	4	5	6	7
DVTK Jegesmedvék	4–1	UTE	1:2	4:1	4:2	5:2	2:1		
MAC Budapest	4–1	Debreceni HK	6:1	5:1	7:2	2:4	5:1		

=== Finals ===
The final games were played between 14 March and 28 March 2017 in a best-of-seven mode.

==== (1) DVTK Jegesmedvék vs. (2) MAC Budapest ====
14 March 2017	DVTK Jegesmedvék	5–4	OT	MAC Budapest	Miskolc Ice Hall	Recap
Andrew Johnston - 17:43		First period		18:38 - Roland Vokla
Attila Pavuk - 37:31; Nikandrosz Galanisz - 39:19		Second period		39:46 - Vladimir Nikiforov
Grant Toulmin - 41:36		Third period		57:25 - Jon Booras; 59:02 - Sean Escobedo
Andrew Johnston - 02:24		First overtime period		No scoring
Attila Adorján .. saves / .. shots		Goalie stats		Bence Bálizs .. saves / .. shots

16 March 2017	MAC Budapest	3–0	DVTK Jegesmedvék	Tüskecsarnok	Recap
Balázs Somogyi - 11:12; István Terbócs - 12:14		First period	No scoring
Bronson Zoltan Kovacs - pp - 25:46		Second period	No scoring
No scoring		Third period	No scoring
Bence Bálizs .. saves / .. shots		Goalie stats	Attila Adorján .. saves / .. shots

18 March 2017	DVTK Jegesmedvék	4–3	MAC Budapest	Miskolc Ice Hall	Recap
Balázs Gőz - pp - 08:23; Balázs Gőz - pp - 13:07		First period	No scoring
Mátyás Vojtkó - 24:30		Second period	No scoring
Joe Colin - 45:56		Third period	42:55 - Sean Escobedo; 50:29 - pp - Bronson Zoltan Kovacs; 53:54 - pp - Krisztián Nagy
Attila Adorján .. saves / .. shots		Goalie stats	Bence Bálizs .. saves / .. shots

20 March 2017	MAC Budapest	3–4	DVTK Jegesmedvék	Tüskecsarnok	Recap
Balázs Somogyi - 09:20		First period	05:13 - Peter Sakaris; 17:45 - Adrián Tóth
No scoring		Second period	No scoring
Drew Olson - 40:49; Tamás Pozsgai - 59:56		Third period	46:44 - pp - Márk Miskolczi; 52:27 - sh - Andrew Johnston
Bence Bálizs .. saves / .. shots		Goalie stats	Attila Adorján .. saves / .. shots

22 March 2017	DVTK Jegesmedvék	2–1	MAC Budapest	Miskolc Ice Hall	Recap
No scoring		First period	No scoring
No scoring		Second period	33:33 - István Terbócs
Roland Hajós - 46:02; Attila Pavuk - 58:22		Third period	No scoring
Attila Adorján .. saves / .. shots		Goalie stats	Bence Bálizs .. saves / .. shots

DVTK Jegesmedvék won series 4–1

Games in italics indicate games that will only be played if necessary to determine a winner of the series.

== Final rankings ==
Gold medal	DVTK Jegesmedvék
Silver medal	MAC Budapest
Bronze medal	UTE
4	Debreceni HK
5	ASC Corona Brașov
6	Dunaújvárosi Acélbikák
7	Ferencvárosi TC
8	Fehérvári Titánok
9	Dunărea Galați
10	HK Beograd
11	Sport Club Csíkszereda
