= Jesse Dudas =

Canadian-Hungarian ice hockey player

- Born: 31 March 1988 (age 38) St. Albert, Alberta, Canada
- Height: 6 ft 2 in (188 cm)
- Weight: 216 lb (98 kg; 15 st 6 lb)
- Position: Defenseman
- Shot: Right
- Played for: Charlotte Checkers; Orlando Solar Bears; DVTK Jegesmedvék; HC TPS; Debreceni HK; MAC Budapest; HC Vítkovice
- National team: Hungary
- NHL draft: 159th overall, 2006; Columbus Blue Jackets
- Playing career: 2009–2022

Jesse Dudas (born 31 March 1988) is a Canadian-Hungarian former professional ice hockey defenceman who played most notably in Europe. He is of Hungarian descent. He was selected by the Columbus Blue Jackets in the sixth round, 159th overall, of the 2006 NHL entry draft.

Dudas made his international debut and played for Hungary at the 2016 IIHF World Championship in Russia.

== Career statistics ==
=== Regular season and playoffs ===
			Regular season					Playoffs
Season	Team	League	GP	G	A	Pts	PIM	GP	G	A	Pts	PIM
2003–04	St. Albert Saints AAA	AMHL	28	5	7	12	74	—	—	—	—	—
2003–04	Lethbridge Hurricanes	WHL	4	0	0	0	2	—	—	—	—	—
2004–05	Lethbridge Hurricanes	WHL	44	1	3	4	28	—	—	—	—	—
2005–06	Lethbridge Hurricanes	WHL	18	0	7	7	12	—	—	—	—	—
2005–06	Prince George Cougars	WHL	6	0	4	4	15	—	—	—	—	—
2006–07	Prince George Cougars	WHL	32	2	27	29	51	—	—	—	—	—
2007–08	Prince George Cougars	WHL	29	2	19	21	68	—	—	—	—	—
2007–08	Swift Current Broncos	WHL	23	3	11	14	38	6	1	2	3	14
2008–09	Regina Pats	WHL	19	3	11	14	26	—	—	—	—	—
2008–09	Charlotte Checkers	ECHL	5	0	0	0	10	—	—	—	—	—
2009–10	Bloomington Prairie Thunder	IHL	17	4	5	9	6	—	—	—	—	—
2009–10	Corpus Christi IceRays	CHL	7	1	2	3	2	2	0	1	1	2
2010–11	Texas Brahmas	CHL	11	2	3	5	10	—	—	—	—	—
2011–12	Horse Lake Chiefs	NPHL	13	11	16	27	34	—	—	—	—	—
2012–13	Bloomington Blaze	CHL	31	14	17	31	38	—	—	—	—	—
2012–13	Orlando Solar Bears	ECHL	6	1	2	3	6	—	—	—	—	—
2013–14	Wichita Thunder	CHL	54	14	24	38	77	—	—	—	—	—
2014–15	Miskolci Jegesmedvék JSE	MOL	34	11	32	43	169	7	6	5	11	8
2015–16	DVTK Jegesmedvék	MOL	36	13	39	52	163	3	1	4	5
2016–17	Debreceni Hoki Klub	MOL	6	1	5	6	8	11	3	8	11	28
2017–18	MAC Budapest	EL	30	5	15	20		15	5	8	13
2018–19	MAC Újbuda	SVK	51	11	28	39	38	7	1	5	6	0
2019–20	DVTK Jegesmedvék	SVK	34	5	14	19	24	—	—	—	—	—
2019–20	HC Vítkovice Ridera	ELH	10	0	4	4	6	—	—	—	—	—
2021–22	TH Unia Oświęcim	POL	9	2	6	8	6	—	—	—	—	—
2021–22	Rostock Piranhas	GER.3	30	14	20	34	22	—	—	—	—	—
CHL totals			103	31	46	77	127	2	0	1	1	2
MOL/EL totals			106	30	91	121	340	36	15	25	40	36

=== International ===
Year	Team	Event	GP	G	A	Pts	PIM
2005	Canada Pacific	U17	6	0	7	7	6
2016	Hungary	WC	7	0	0	0	8
Senior totals			7	0	0	0	8
