= Teemu Elomo =

Finnish ice hockey player (born 1979)

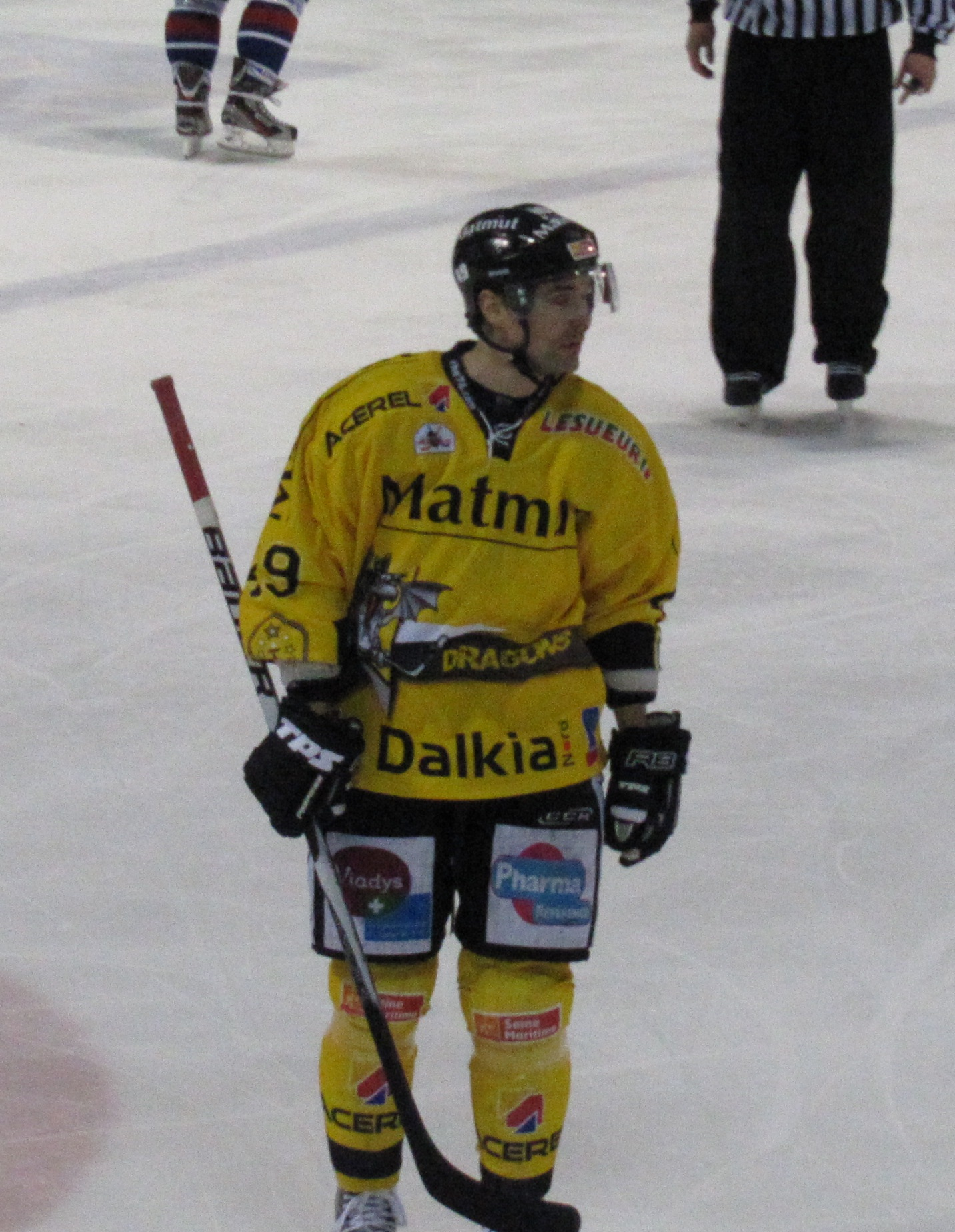
- Born: January 13, 1979 (age 47) Turku, Finland
- Height: 5 ft 11 in (180 cm)
- Weight: 181 lb (82 kg; 12 st 13 lb)
- Position: Right wing
- Shot: Left
- Played for: TPS; Blues; Mora IK; Alba Volán Székesfehérvár; Herning Blue Fox; Tingsryds AIF; Dragons de Rouen; Arystan Temirtau; Herlev Eagles; Újpesti TE
- National team: Finland
- NHL draft: 132nd overall, 1997; Dallas Stars
- Playing career: 1996–2017

Teemu Elomo (born January 13, 1979) is a Finnish former professional ice hockey player. He played in the SM-liiga for TPS and Blues. He was drafted 132nd overall by the Dallas Stars in the 1997 NHL entry draft. He is the younger brother of Miika Elomo who played two games in the National Hockey League for the Washington Capitals.

== Career statistics ==
			Regular season					Playoffs
Season	Team	League	GP	G	A	Pts	PIM	GP	G	A	Pts	PIM
1993–94	HC TPS U16	U16 SM-sarja	34	7	25	32	56	—	—	—	—	—
1994–95	HC TPS U16	U16 SM-sarja	24	19	22	41	82	—	—	—	—	—
1994–95	HC TPS U18	U18 SM-sarja	12	5	2	7	16	—	—	—	—	—
1995–96	HC TPS U18	U18 SM-sarja	17	9	8	17	28	—	—	—	—	—
1995–96	HC TPS U20	U20 SM-liiga	2	0	0	0	0	—	—	—	—	—
1995–96	Kiekko-67	I-Divisioona	11	1	0	1	4	6	2	0	2	8
1996–97	HC TPS U20	U20 SM-liiga	9	6	2	8	16	—	—	—	—	—
1996–97	HC TPS	SM-liiga	6	0	1	1	0	3	0	0	0	2
1996–97	Kiekko-67	I-Divisioona	15	4	3	7	24	—	—	—	—	—
1997–98	HC TPS U20	U20 SM-liiga	14	10	11	21	30	—	—	—	—	—
1997–98	HC TPS	SM-liiga	26	3	3	6	14	3	1	0	1	2
1998–99	HC TPS U20	U20 SM-liiga	2	1	3	4	4	1	0	0	0	0
1998–99	HC TPS	SM-liiga	34	4	8	12	16	5	0	0	0	2
1999–00	HC TPS	SM-liiga	52	9	7	16	30	11	3	2	5	2
2000–01	HC TPS	SM-liiga	56	2	10	12	44	10	1	3	4	0
2001–02	Espoo Blues	SM-liiga	49	12	14	26	66	3	0	0	0	14
2002–03	Espoo Blues	SM-liiga	54	13	29	42	60	7	1	1	2	4
2003–04	Espoo Blues	SM-liiga	55	11	12	23	34	9	5	1	6	14
2004–05	Espoo Blues	SM-liiga	55	8	19	27	48	—	—	—	—	—
2005–06	Mora IK	Elitserien	50	7	12	19	44	5	0	3	3	0
2006–07	Mora IK	Elitserien	55	10	26	36	28	4	0	3	3	6
2007–08	Mora IK	Elitserien	53	11	14	25	26	—	—	—	—	—
2008–09	Mora IK	HockeyAllsvenskan	45	12	30	42	65	3	0	0	0	0
2009–10	Fehérvár AV19	EBEL	7	0	3	3	6	—	—	—	—	—
2009–10	Herning Blue Fox	Denmark	25	11	15	26	32	12	6	4	10	10
2010–11	Tingsryds AIF	HockeyAllsvenskan	51	14	22	36	65	—	—	—	—	—
2011–12	Dragons de Rouen	Ligue Magnus	24	9	15	24	22	14	2	7	9	34
2012–13	Arystan Temirtau	Kazakhstan	9	1	3	4	2	11	2	1	3	6
2013–14	Herlev Eagles	Denmark	38	8	24	32	38	4	0	0	0	16
2014–15	Újpesti TE	MOL Liga	39	20	37	57	111	3	1	2	3	4
2015–16	Újpesti TE	MOL Liga	19	7	12	19	14	—	—	—	—	—
2015–16	HC Nove Zamky	Slovak2	3	0	1	1	0	—	—	—	—	—
2015–16	TUTO Hockey	Mestis	7	2	2	4	6	7	1	2	3	2
2016–17	Olofströms IK	Division 2	3	1	2	3	2	—	—	—	—	—
SM-liiga totals			387	62	103	165	312	51	11	7	18	40
Elitserien totals			158	28	52	80	98	9	0	6	6	6
