= 2015–16 MOL Liga season =

2015–16 MOL Liga
- League: MOL Liga
- Sport: Ice hockey
- Teams: 9

Regular season
- DVTK Jegesmedvék: DVTK Jegesmedvék
- DVTK Jegesmedvék: DVTK Jegesmedvék
- Runners-up: MAC Budapest
- Season MVP: Jon Booras
- Top scorer: Ian McDonald

MOL Liga seasons
- ← 2014–15 2016-17 →

The 2015–16 MOL Liga was 8th season of the MOL Liga. DVTK Jegesmedvék was the defending champion after defeating HC Nové Zámky in the 2014-2015 season. The league is a multi-national ice hockey league consisting of teams from Hungary and Romania. A new team, Budapest based MAC Budapest joined the league.

== Team information ==
Team	City	Arena	Capacity
ASC Corona Brașov	(Romania) Brașov	Patinoarul Olimpic Brașov	1,604
HSC Csíkszereda	(Romania) Csíkszereda	Vakár Lajos Műjégpálya	3,500
Dunaújvárosi Acélbikák	(Hungary) Dunaújváros	Dunaújvárosi Jégcsarnok	4,500
Debreceni HK	(Hungary) Debrecen	Debreceni Jégcsarnok	590
DVTK Jegesmedvék	(Hungary) Miskolc	Miskolci Jégcsarnok	2,200
Alba Volán Székesfehérvár (II.)	(Hungary) Székesfehérvár	Ifj. Ocskay Gábor Jégcsarnok	3,600
Ferencvárosi TC	(Hungary) Budapest	Pesterzsébeti Jégcsarnok	2,400
MAC Budapest	(Hungary) Budapest	Tüskecsarnok	2,540
Újpesti TE	(Hungary) Budapest	Megyeri úti Jégcsarnok	2,000

== Regular season (Alapszakasz) ==
=== Standings ===
Pos	Team	Pld	W	OTW	OTL	L	GF	GA	GD	Pts	Qualification
1	DVTK Jegesmedvék	48	33	8	2	5	0	0	0	117	Qualification to Playoffs
2	MAC Budapest	48	32	5	5	6	0	0	0	111	Qualification to Playoffs
3	Fehérvári Titánok	48	25	5	4	14	0	0	0	89	Qualification to Playoffs
4	Debreceni HK	48	19	4	6	19	0	0	0	71	Qualification to Playoffs
5	UTE	48	16	7	7	18	0	0	0	69	Qualification to Playoffs
6	Ferencvárosi TC	48	18	2	4	24	0	0	0	62	Qualification to Playoffs
7	Sport Club Csíkszereda	48	14	6	5	23	0	0	0	59	
8	Dunaújvárosi Acélbikák	48	12	2	6	28	0	0	0	46	
9	ASC Corona Brașov	48	6	2	2	38	0	0	0	24	

Updated to match(es) played on unknown. Source:
Rules for classification: 1) points; 2) head-to-head points; 3) head-to-head goal difference; 4) head-to-head number of goals scored.

== Playoffs ==
Quarter-Finals
1	DVTK Jegesmedvek
8	First Round Bye
2	MAC Budapest
7	First Round Bye
(Pairings are reseeded after the first round)
3	Szekesfehervar AV19	2
6	Ferencvaros TC	0
4	Debreceni HK	2
5	Ujpesti TE	1

Semi-Finals
1	DVTK Jegesmedvek	4
4	Debreceni HK	0
2	MAC Budapest	4
3	Szekesfehervar AV19	3

Finals
1	DVTK Jegesmedvek	4
2	MAC Budapest	0
