= 2008–09 MOL Liga season =

2008–09 MOL Season
- League: MOL Liga
- Sport: Ice hockey

MOL Liga seasons
- 2009–10 →

The 2008–2009 MOL Liga Season was the first season played, of this international ice hockey. Six teams from Hungary and two from Romania participated.

== Teams ==
(Hungary) Alba Volán Székesfehérvár II
(Hungary) Budapest Stars
(Hungary) Dunaújvárosi Acélbikák
(Hungary) Ferencvárosi TC
(Romania) HC Csíkszereda
(Romania) Progym Hargita Gyöngye
(Hungary) Miskolci JJSE
(Romania) SC Miercurea Ciuc
(Romania) Steaua București
(Hungary) Újpesti TE

== Standings ==
Final Standings

	Team	GP	W	OTW	OTL	L	Pts.
1	HC Csíkszereda	36	27	3	4	2	91
2	SC Miercurea Ciuc	36	25	3	1	7	82
3	Újpesti TE	36	24	2	3	7	79
4	Budapest Stars	36	19	2	2	13	63
5	Dunaújvárosi Acélbikák	36	18	3	2	13	62
6	Steaua Bucuresti	36	18	1	1	16	57
7	Ferencvárosi TC	36	13	0	1	22	40
8	Progym Gheorghieni	36	11	1	1	23	36
9	Miskolci JJSE	36	3	1	2	30	13
10	Alba Volán II	36	3	1	0	32	11

== Play-offs ==
=== Semifinals ===
- HC Csíkszereda 2–0 Budapest Stars
- SC Miercurea Ciuc 2–0 Újpesti TE

=== Finals ===
- HC Csíkszereda 3–0 SC Miercurea Ciuc
