= Jesse Schultz =

Canadian ice hockey player (born 1982)

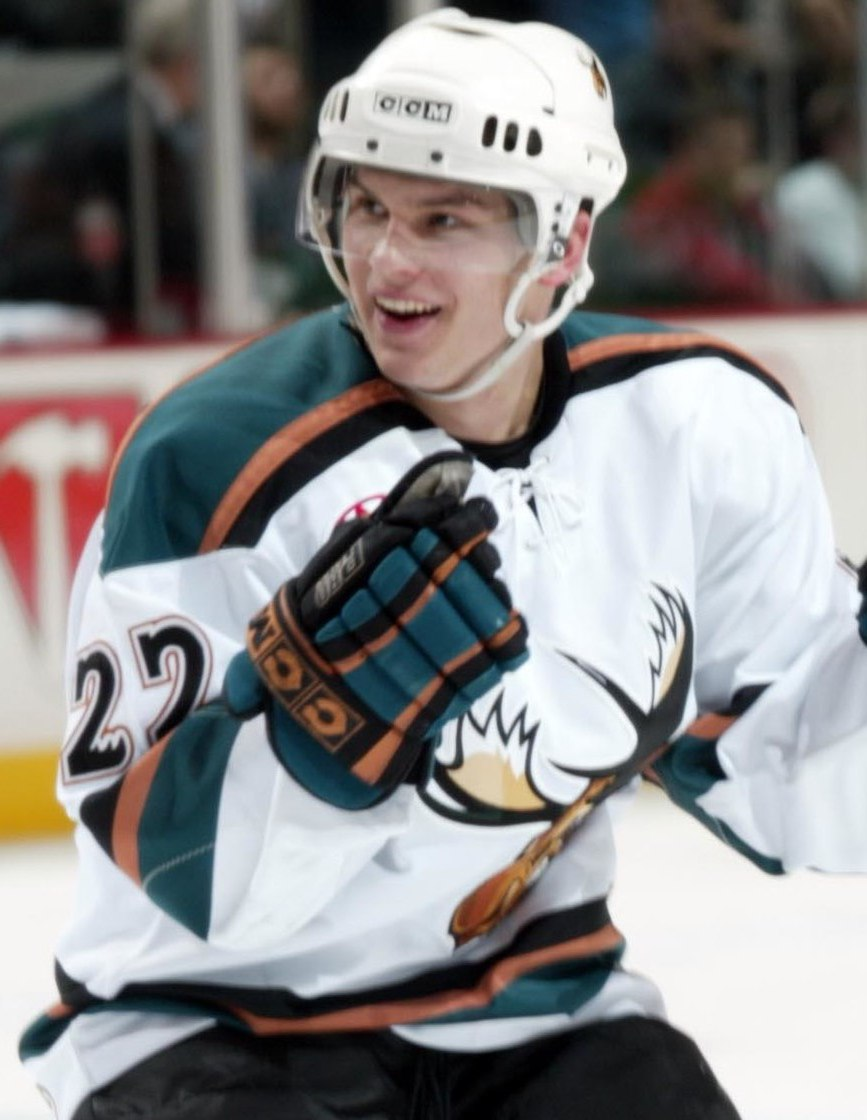
- Schultz with the Manitoba Moose in 2006
- Born: September 28, 1982 (age 43) Strasbourg, Saskatchewan, Canada
- Height: 6 ft 0 in (183 cm)
- Weight: 192 lb (87 kg; 13 st 10 lb)
- Position: Right wing
- Shot: Right
- Played for: Vancouver Canucks; IF Björklöven; Nürnberg Ice Tigers; SG Cortina; Hockey Milano Rossoblu; SC Riessersee; Sheffield Steelers; Debreceni HK; HC Nové Zámky
- NHL draft: Undrafted
- Playing career: 2003–2022

Jesse Schultz (born September 28, 1982) is a former Canadian professional ice hockey right winger, who most recently played under contract with the Cincinnati Cyclones of the ECHL.

== Playing career ==
=== Junior ===
Schultz spent four seasons of junior hockey in the Western Hockey League, starting in the 1999–2000 season with the Tri-City Americans. He would be dealt to the Prince Albert Raiders midway through the 2000–01 season, where he played well, scoring 32 points in 35 games for the Raiders. However, it wasn't enough to get him selected in the 2001 NHL entry draft, as he was passed over in his first year of eligibility.

Schultz was traded to the Kelowna Rockets for the 2001–02 season, and posted solid totals of 28 goals and 64 points. However, he was passed over again in the NHL draft as scouts deemed him too small and too slow for the pro game. However, a 53-goal, 104-point performance in 2002–03 would earn him a free-agent contract from the Vancouver Canucks on July 31, 2003.

=== Professional ===
Schultz turned pro in 2003 but failed to make the Manitoba Moose, the Canucks' primary farm team. Instead, he suited up for the ECHL Columbia Inferno, scoring 27 goals in 52 games. In 2004–05, Schultz did manage to stick in Manitoba, posting 9 goals and 24 points in 70 AHL games.

The 2005–06 season was a turning point for Schultz. After a disappointing first two professional seasons and in the last year of his contract with the Canucks, his pro future looked uncertain. However, he would have a standout year, leading the Moose with 37 goals and 67 points, and re-established himself as a player with NHL potential.

Heading into the 2006–07 NHL season, Schultz was considered a favourite to crack the Canucks' roster following the departure of several veteran forwards. Adding to his chances, he was a favourite of head coach Alain Vigneault, who had been promoted to Vancouver after coaching the Moose the previous season. However, Schultz had an extremely disappointing training camp and was returned to the AHL. Schultz was recalled to the Canucks after a solid start in Manitoba and made his NHL debut on November 29, 2006 against the Columbus Blue Jackets.

On July 23, 2007, Schultz was traded from the Vancouver Canucks to the Atlanta Thrashers for Jim Sharrow. He would not play a game with the Thrashers in the 2007–08 season, instead playing with their affiliate the Chicago Wolves, where he would help them win the Calder Cup.

On July 6, 2008, Schultz signed with the Minnesota Wild on a one-year contract and was later assigned to affiliate the Houston Aeros. During the following season in 2009–10, Schultz joined the Thomas Sabo Ice Tigers on January 6, 2010 for the remainder of the year.

On June 23, 2015, Schultz returned to Europe in signing a one-year contract with German club, SC Riessersee of the DEL2. In the summer of 2016, Schultz moved to the UK to sign for the Sheffield Steelers but he left the club in late December 2016.

On September 29, 2017, after beginning his third successive season in Europe with HC Nové Zámky of the Slovak Extraliga, Schultz returned to North America after five games in signing an ECHL contract with the Cincinnati Cyclones. He played three seasons with the Cyclones, winning the ECHL Most Valuable Player and ECHL Leading Scorer Award in the 2018–19 season. In 2021, he signed with the ECHL's Greenville Swamp Rabbits.

With the Cyclones returning to play for the 2021–22 season, Schultz returned to the club agreeing to a one-year contract on July 14, 2021.

== Personal life ==
Schultz's cousin, Nick grew up in the same hometown and is also a professional ice hockey player.

== Career statistics ==
			Regular season					Playoffs
Season	Team	League	GP	G	A	Pts	PIM	GP	G	A	Pts	PIM
1999–00	Tri-City Americans	WHL	62	10	6	16	34	4	1	1	2	2
2000–01	Tri-City Americans	WHL	30	5	8	13	16	—	—	—	—	—
2000–01	Prince Albert Raiders	WHL	35	14	18	32	14	—	—	—	—	—
2001–02	Kelowna Rockets	WHL	73	28	36	64	30	15	5	7	12	8
2002–03	Kelowna Rockets	WHL	72	53	51	104	47	19	12	16	28	21
2003–04	Columbia Inferno	ECHL	52	27	21	48	72	4	1	2	3	2
2003–04	Manitoba Moose	AHL	2	0	1	1	0	—	—	—	—	—
2004–05	Manitoba Moose	AHL	70	9	15	24	33	14	3	2	5	2
2005–06	Manitoba Moose	AHL	80	37	30	67	65	13	5	7	12	10
2006–07	Manitoba Moose	AHL	67	18	21	39	35	7	0	0	0	2
2006–07	Vancouver Canucks	NHL	2	0	0	0	0	—	—	—	—	—
2007–08	Chicago Wolves	AHL	80	26	40	66	43	24	8	5	13	18
2008–09	Houston Aeros	AHL	76	22	33	55	51	8	1	1	2	2
2009–10	IF Björklöven	Allsv	21	7	9	16	16	—	—	—	—	—
2009–10	Nürnberg Ice Tigers	DEL	21	4	8	12	16	4	0	2	2	27
2010–11	SG Cortina	ITL	33	16	33	49	30	—	—	—	—	—
2010–11	Rapid City Rush	CHL	6	0	4	4	4	15	1	9	10	30
2011–12	Rapid City Rush	CHL	49	24	40	64	58	6	5	4	9	4
2012–13	Hockey Milano Rossoblu	ITL	8	2	2	4	4	—	—	—	—	—
2012–13	Rapid City Rush	CHL	43	18	27	45	12	6	1	3	4	0
2013–14	Rapid City Rush	CHL	66	23	62	85	26	7	2	2	4	4
2014–15	Rapid City Rush	ECHL	70	34	43	77	65	13	2	4	6	2
2015–16	SC Riessersee	DEL2	52	22	23	45	28	3	0	1	1	0
2016–17	Sheffield Steelers	EIHL	22	8	11	19	12	—	—	—	—	—
2016–17	Debreceni HK	MOL	7	4	7	11	2	12	8	8	16	45
2017–18	HC Nové Zámky	Slovak	5	1	0	1	2	—	—	—	—	—
2017–18	Cincinnati Cyclones	ECHL	72	18	57	75	43	5	2	2	4	4
2018–19	Cincinnati Cyclones	ECHL	71	22	58	80	20	11	3	4	7	4
2019–20	Cincinnati Cyclones	ECHL	62	25	39	64	41	—	—	—	—	—
2020–21	Greenville Swamp Rabbits	ECHL	18	2	2	4	6	—	—	—	—	—
2021–22	Cincinnati Cyclones	ECHL	71	23	48	71	65	7	0	4	4	0
AHL totals			375	112	140	252	227	66	17	15	32	34
NHL totals			2	0	0	0	0	—	—	—	—	—

== Awards and honours ==
Award	Year
WHL
West First All-Star Team	2003
Playoff MVP	2003
AHL
Calder Cup (Chicago Wolves)	2008
ECHL
Most Valuable Player	2018–19
All-ECHL First Team	2018–19
All-ECHL Second Team	2017–18, 2019–20
ECHL Leading Scorer Award	2018–19
