= 2013–14 MOL Liga season =

2013–14 MOL Season
- League: MOL Liga
- Sport: Ice hockey
- Duration: September 2, 2013- February 23, 2014(regular season), February 26, 2014 - March 6, 2014 (playoff semifinals)

MOL Liga seasons
- ← 2012–13 2014-15 →

The 2013–14 MOL Liga season was the sixth season of the MOL Liga. The league is a multi-national ice hockey league consisting of teams from Hungary, Romania, and Slovakia. Balázs Ladányi from Dunaújvárosi Acélbikák was the season's leading scorer with 63 points.

== Results ==
Game by game results can be viewed here

== Standings ==
| Pl. | | GP | W | OTW | OTL | L | Goals | Pts |
| 1. | (Hungary) Dab.Docler | 48 | 28 | 5 | 3 | 12 | 200:123 | 97 |
| 2. | (Slovakia) HC Nové Zámky | 48 | 25 | 5 | 5 | 13 | 189:152 | 90 |
| 3. | (Romania) ASC Corona Brașov | 48 | 25 | 1 | 6 | 16 | 161:138 | 83 |
| 4. | (Hungary) Miskolci Jegesmedvék JSE | 48 | 21 | 7 | 4 | 16 | 166:131 | 81 |
| 5. | (Romania) HSC Csíkszereda | 48 | 20 | 7 | 2 | 19 | 140:144 | 76 |
| 6. | (Hungary) Ferencváros ESMTK | 48 | 19 | 3 | 8 | 18 | 189:201 | 71 |
| 7. | (Hungary) Újpesti TE | 48 | 1 | 1 | 1 | 45 | 85:241 | 6 |

== Playoffs ==
Semifinals
2 | HC Nové Zámky | 3
4 | Miskolci JJSE | 1
1 | Dunaújvárosi Acélbikák | 1
3 | Corona Brasov Wolves | 3

Finals
2 | HC Nové Zámky | 4
3 | Corona Brasov Wolves | 2
