= Marko Mäkinen =

Finnish ice hockey player

- Born: March 31, 1977 (age 49) Turku, Finland
- Height: 6 ft 4 in (193 cm)
- Weight: 218 lb (99 kg; 15 st 8 lb)
- Position: Right wing
- Shot: Right
- SEL team Former teams: Luleå HF; Espoo Blues (SM-liiga); Kentucky Thoroughblades (AHL); Louisville RiverFrogs (ECHL); Indianapolis Ice (IHL); Greenville Grrrowl (ECHL); Lukko (SM-liiga); HIFK (SM-liiga); Tappara (SM-liiga); Ässät (SM-liiga); TPS (SM-liiga); HC TWK Innsbruck (ÖEL)
- NHL draft: 64th overall, 1995; San Jose Sharks
- Playing career: 1994–2023

Marko Mäkinen (born March 31, 1977) is a Finnish former professional ice hockey player who played with TPS Turku in the Finnish SM-liiga.

== Career statistics ==
| | | | Regular season | | | | | Playoffs |
| Season | Team | League | GP | G | A | Pts | PIM | GP | G | A | Pts | PIM |
|---|---|---|---|---|---|---|---|---|---|---|---|---|
| 1992–93 | HC TPS U18 | U18 SM-sarja | 6 | 0 | 0 | 0 | 0 | — | — | — | — | — |
| 1993–94 | HC TPS U18 | U18 SM-sarja | 24 | 6 | 5 | 11 | 28 | — | — | — | — | — |
| 1993–94 | HC TPS U20 | U20 SM-liiga | 1 | 0 | 1 | 1 | 0 | — | — | — | — | — |
| 1994–95 | HC TPS U20 | U20 SM-liiga | 26 | 7 | 1 | 8 | 34 | — | — | — | — | — |
| 1994–95 | Kiekko-67 | I-Divisioona | 4 | 0 | 0 | 0 | 6 | — | — | — | — | — |
| 1995–96 | HC TPS U20 | U20 SM-liiga | 11 | 5 | 1 | 6 | 28 | — | — | — | — | — |
| 1995–96 | Kiekko-67 | I-Divisioona | 21 | 6 | 2 | 8 | 98 | 6 | 2 | 2 | 4 | 6 |
| 1996–97 | HC TPS U20 | U20 SM-liiga | 2 | 0 | 0 | 0 | 6 | — | — | — | — | — |
| 1996–97 | Kiekko-67 | I-Divisioona | 30 | 2 | 8 | 10 | 63 | — | — | — | — | — |
| 1996–97 | Kiekko-Espoo U20 | U20 SM-liiga | 2 | 1 | 1 | 2 | 2 | — | — | — | — | — |
| 1996–97 | Kiekko-Espoo | SM-liiga | 15 | 2 | 1 | 3 | 34 | 4 | 0 | 0 | 0 | 0 |
| 1997–98 | Kentucky Thoroughblades | AHL | 26 | 2 | 2 | 4 | 15 | — | — | — | — | — |
| 1997–98 | Louisville RiverFrogs | ECHL | 38 | 10 | 6 | 16 | 19 | — | — | — | — | — |
| 1998–99 | Indianapolis Ice | IHL | 5 | 0 | 0 | 0 | 0 | — | — | — | — | — |
| 1998–99 | Greenville Grrrowl | ECHL | 20 | 3 | 5 | 8 | 14 | — | — | — | — | — |
| 1998–99 | Lukko | SM-liiga | 21 | 1 | 0 | 1 | 30 | — | — | — | — | — |
| 1999–00 | HIFK Hockey | SM-liiga | 2 | 0 | 0 | 0 | 0 | — | — | — | — | — |
| 1999–00 | FPS | I-Divisioona | 10 | 2 | 0 | 2 | 30 | — | — | — | — | — |
| 1999–00 | TUTO Hockey | I-Divisioona | 27 | 4 | 3 | 7 | 81 | 5 | 1 | 1 | 2 | 10 |
| 2000–01 | Tappara | SM-liiga | 29 | 6 | 2 | 8 | 22 | 10 | 1 | 1 | 2 | 4 |
| 2000–01 | Ahmat Hyvinkää | Mestis | 19 | 10 | 10 | 20 | 50 | 1 | 0 | 0 | 0 | 0 |
| 2001–02 | Tappara | SM-liiga | 56 | 10 | 2 | 12 | 89 | 10 | 1 | 0 | 1 | 16 |
| 2002–03 | Tappara | SM-liiga | 51 | 5 | 7 | 12 | 79 | 15 | 3 | 2 | 5 | 12 |
| 2003–04 | Tappara | SM-liiga | 56 | 10 | 12 | 22 | 42 | 3 | 0 | 0 | 0 | 0 |
| 2004–05 | Tappara | SM-liiga | 55 | 6 | 6 | 12 | 42 | 7 | 0 | 1 | 1 | 2 |
| 2005–06 | Tappara | SM-liiga | 54 | 6 | 2 | 8 | 32 | 6 | 1 | 0 | 1 | 6 |
| 2006–07 | HC TPS | SM-liiga | 47 | 4 | 7 | 11 | 79 | 2 | 0 | 0 | 0 | 2 |
| 2007–08 | HC Innsbruck | EBEL | 42 | 13 | 14 | 27 | 83 | 3 | 0 | 0 | 0 | 6 |
| 2008–09 | Porin Ässät | SM-liiga | 36 | 3 | 7 | 10 | 36 | — | — | — | — | — |
| 2009–10 | Porin Ässät | SM-liiga | 34 | 3 | 1 | 4 | 51 | — | — | — | — | — |
| 2009–10 | HC TPS | SM-liiga | 13 | 1 | 0 | 1 | 10 | 9 | 1 | 0 | 1 | 4 |
| 2010–11 | Vasas Budapest Stars | MOL Liga | 5 | 1 | 4 | 5 | 18 | 7 | 4 | 6 | 10 | 12 |
| 2010–11 | Vasas Budapest Stars | Hungary | 15 | 9 | 17 | 26 | 40 | 5 | 1 | 2 | 3 | 38 |
| 2011–12 | Pingouins de Morzine-Avoriaz | Ligue Magnus | 26 | 6 | 6 | 12 | 48 | 5 | 1 | 4 | 5 | 4 |
| 2012–13 | Haka Hockey | III-Divisioona | 6 | 4 | 9 | 13 | 10 | — | — | — | — | — |
| 2012–13 | Haka Hockey | 2. Divisioona | 15 | 9 | 9 | 18 | 42 | — | — | — | — | — |
| 2013–14 | Haka Hockey | 2. Divisioona | 16 | 7 | 10 | 17 | 64 | — | — | — | — | — |
| 2014–15 | Haka Hockey | 2. Divisioona | 2 | 3 | 4 | 7 | 0 | — | — | — | — | — |
| 2015–16 | Haka Hockey | 2. Divisioona | 6 | 3 | 9 | 12 | 8 | 1 | 0 | 0 | 0 | 0 |
| 2016–17 | Haka Hockey | 2. Divisioona | 2 | 1 | 0 | 1 | 56 | — | — | — | — | — |
| 2017–18 | Haka | 2. Divisioona | 1 | 0 | 1 | 1 | 2 | — | — | — | — | — |
| 2018–19 | PKS | IV-Divisioona | 2 | 2 | 6 | 8 | 6 | — | — | — | — | — |
| 2019–20 | PKS | III-Divisioona | 1 | 0 | 1 | 1 | 0 | — | — | — | — | — |
| 2020–21 | PKS | 2. Divisioona | 3 | 0 | 3 | 3 | 12 | — | — | — | — | — |
| 2021–22 | PKS | 2. Divisioona | 4 | 1 | 3 | 4 | 2 | — | — | — | — | — |
| 2022–23 | PKS | 2. Divisioona | 1 | 1 | 1 | 2 | 2 | — | — | — | — | — |
| AHL totals | | | 26 | 2 | 2 | 4 | 15 | — | — | — | — | — |
| ECHL totals | | | 58 | 13 | 11 | 24 | 33 | — | — | — | — | — |
| IHL totals | | | 5 | 0 | 0 | 0 | 0 | — | — | — | — | — |
| SM-liiga totals | | | 469 | 57 | 47 | 104 | 546 | 76 | 7 | 5 | 12 | 64 |
