= 2012–13 MOL Liga season =

2012–13 MOL Season
- League: MOL Liga
- Sport: Ice hockey

MOL Liga seasons
- ← 2011–12 2013-14 →

The 2012–13 MOL Liga season was the fifth season of the MOL Liga, a multi-national ice hockey league consisting of teams from Hungary, Romania, and Slovakia. Seven teams participated in the league, and DAB-Docler won the championship.

The league also served as the Hungarian Championship for 2012–13. DAB-Docler, the MOL Liga champion, was also the Hungarian national champion.

== Regular season ==
Pl.	Club	GP	W	OTW	OTL	L	Goals	Pts
1.	(Hungary) DAB-Docler	48	32	4	2	10	204:116	106
2.	(Hungary) Miskolci JJSE	48	27	3	4	14	210:135	91
3.	(Romania) HSC Csíkszereda	48	25	3	5	15	155:140	86
4.	(Slovakia) HC Nové Zámky	48	26	3	1	18	163:137	85
5.	(Romania) ASC Corona Brasov	48	24	5	3	16	175:135	85
6.	(Hungary) Ferencváros ESMTK	48	6	5	3	34	118:211	31
7.	(Hungary) Újpesti TE	48	3	2	7	36	87:238	20

== Playoffs ==
=== Semifinals ===
Teams	Series	Game 1	Game 2	Game 3	Game 4	Game 5
DAB-Docler − Miskolci Jegesmedve JSE	3:1	7:2 (4:1, 1:1, 2:0)	2:4 (0:2, 2:1, 0:1)	4:1 (1:1, 0:0, 3:0)	2:1 OT (0:1, 1:0, 0:0, 1:0)	–
HSC Csíkszereda − HC Nové Zámky	3:0	5:3 (0:1, 2:2, 3:0)	7:0 (3:0, 3:0, 1:0)	4:1 (2:1, 1:0, 1:0)	–	–

=== Final ===
Teams	Series	Game 1	Game 2	Game 3	Game 4	Game 5	Game 6	Game 7
DAB-Docler − HSC Csíkszereda	4:2	2:0 (0:0, 1:0, 1:0)	1:3 (0:0, 0:1, 1:2)	4:3 OT (2:2, 0:0, 1:1, 1:0)	3:2 OT (1:0, 0:0, 1:2, 1:0)	1:2 OT (1:0, 0:1, 0:0, 0:1)	4:0 (0:0, 2:0, 2:0)	–
