= Carpathian League =

The Carpathian League was a multi-national ice hockey league organized by the Hungarian Ice Hockey Federation and held for the 1997-98 season featuring teams from the region of the Carpathian Mountains. Teams from Hungary, Poland, Croatia, Slovakia, and Serbia participated. First planned teams for competition were SHK Danubia Bratislava, HK Polygon Nitra, BH Prostejov, STS Autosan Sanok, Crvena Zvezda Belgrad, Dunaferr, Alba Volan, Ferencvaros, Ujpest, Medvescak Zagreb. The League schedule was not very well planned as games were scheduled during international match dates.

== 1997-98 season ==
=== Group A ===
- 17.08.1997 (Poland) STS-Autosan Sanok – (Hungary) Dunaferr SE Dunaújváros 3:4 (1-0, 1-1, 1-3)
- 31.08.1997 (Poland) STS-Autosan Sanok – (Croatia) KHL Medveščak Zagreb 5:5 (2-3, 2-1, 1-1)
- (Hungary) Alba Volán Székesfehérvár - (Croatia) KHL Medveščak Zagreb 7:2 (0-0, 3-0, 4-2)
- 09.09.1997 (Hungary) Alba Volán Székesfehérvár – (Hungary) Dunaferr SE Dunaújváros 5:3 (2-1, 1-2, 2-0)
- 24.10.1997 (Hungary) Dunaferr SE Dunaújváros - (Croatia) KHL Medveščak Zagreb 13:3 (4-1, 3-2, 6-0)
- 25.10.1997 (Hungary) Dunaferr SE Dunaújváros - (Croatia) KHL Medveščak Zagreb 7:4 (3-1, 0-1, 4-2)
- 26.10.1997 (Poland) STS-Autosan Sanok – (Hungary) Alba Volán Székesfehérvár 6:3 (4-1, 1-1, 1-1)
- 30.10.1997 (Hungary) Alba Volán Székesfehérvár – (Poland) STS-Autosan Sanok 8:7 (2-3, 2-2, 4-2)
- (Hungary) Alba Volán Székesfehérvár - (Croatia) KHL Medveščak Zagreb 4:1
- (Hungary) Dunaferr SE Dunaújváros - (Hungary) Alba Volán Székesfehérvár 7:1
- 07.11.1997 (Hungary) Dunaferr SE Dunaújváros - (Poland) STS-Autosan Sanok

Game Postponed to December due to Polish National Team Call-ups then Cancelled due the same reason by STS-Autosan Sanok

- 09.11.1997 (Croatia) KHL Medveščak Zagreb - (Poland) STS-Autosan Sanok

Game Postponed to December due to Polish National Team Call-ups then Cancelled due the same reason by STS-Autosan Sanok

	Club	GP	Goals	Pts
1.	(Hungary) Dunaferr SE Dunaújváros	5	34:16	8
2.	(Hungary) Alba Volán Székesfehérvár	6	28:26	8
3.	(Poland) STS-Autosan Sanok	4	21:20	3
4.	(Croatia) KHL Medveščak Zagreb	5	15:36	1

=== Group B ===
- 25.08.1997 (Slovakia) SHK Danubia 96 Bratislava – (Hungary) Újpesti TE 5:3 (1-2, 2-0, 2-1) Attendance: 600
- (Hungary) Ferencvárosi TC - (Serbia and Montenegro) KHK Crvena Zvezda 11:3
- 02.09.1997 17:00 (Slovakia) SHK Danubia 96 Bratislava - (Serbia and Montenegro) KHK Crvena Zvezda 25:0 (9-0, 9-0, 7-0) Attendance: 400 2nd Gameday
- (Hungary) Újpesti TE - (Serbia and Montenegro) KHK Crvena Zvezda 10:2
- 09.09.1997 17:00 (Slovakia) SHK Danubia 96 Bratislava - (Hungary) Ferencvárosi TC 3:3 3rd Gameday
- (Hungary) Újpesti TE – (Slovakia) SHK Danubia 96 Bratislava 3:4
- 04.11.1997 (Serbia and Montenegro) KHK Crvena Zvezda – (Slovakia) SHK Danubia 96 Bratislava 1:15 (1-2, 0-8, 0-5) 5th Gameday
- (Hungary) Ferencvárosi TC - (Hungary) Újpesti TE 5:2
- 05.11.1997 (Hungary) Ferencvárosi TC – (Slovakia) SHK Danubia 96 Bratislava 0:4 (0-0, 0-4, 0-0) 6th Gameday

	Club	GP	Goals	Pts
1.	(Slovakia) SHK Danubia 96 Bratislava	6	56:10	11
2.	(Hungary) Ferencvárosi TC	6	31:18	8
3.	(Hungary) Újpesti TE	6	36:23	5
4.	(Serbia and Montenegro) KHK Crvena Zvezda	6	12:84	0

=== 3rd Place ===
- (Hungary) Ferencvárosi TC – (Hungary) Alba Volán Székesfehérvár 6:1, 2:3

=== Final ===
- 17.12.1997 (Hungary) Dunaferr SE Dunaújváros – (Slovakia) SHK Danubia 96 Bratislava 7:1 (2-0, 3-1, 2-0)
- 19.12.1997 (Slovakia) SHK Danubia 96 Bratislava - (Hungary) Dunaferr SE Dunaújváros 4:6 (1-3, 2-1, 1-2)
