= 2001–02 OB I bajnoksag season =

Hungarian ice hockey season

The 2001–02 OB I bajnokság season was the 65th season of the OB I bajnokság, the top level of ice hockey in Hungary. Seven teams participated in the league, and Dunaferr SE Dunaujvaros won the championship.

== First round ==
	Club	GP	W	T	L	Goals	Pts
1.	Alba Volán Székesfehérvár	12	12	0	0	126:18	24
2.	Dunaferr SE Dunaújváros	12	10	0	2	149:23	20
3.	Ferencvárosi TC	12	8	0	4	58:40	16
4.	Újpesti TE	12	5	0	7	43:79	10
5.	Györ Eto HC	12	4	0	8	40:74	8
6.	Miskolci JJE	12	2	0	10	31:119	4
7.	MAC-Nepstadion Budapest	12	1	0	11	28:122	2

== Second round ==
=== Group A ===
- Alba Volán Székesfehérvár - Dunaferr SE Dunaújváros 2:1/2:3

=== Group B ===
	Club	GP	W	T	L	Goals	Pts
3.	Ferencvárosi TC	8	6	2	0	54:13	14
4.	Újpesti TE	8	5	1	2	37:22	11
5.	Györi HC	8	4	1	3	46:36	9
6.	MAC-Nepstadion Budapest	8	2	1	5	24:36	5
7.	Miskolci JJE	8	0	1	7	8:62	1

== Final ==
- Alba Volán Székesfehérvár - Dunaferr SE Dunaújváros 2:4 (5:4 OT, 4:7, 4:2, 1:4, 2:6, 2:5)
