= Lauri Kärmeniemi =

Finnish ice hockey player

- Born: 17 April 1991 (age 35) Hämeenlinna, Finland
- Height: 5 ft 10 in (178 cm)
- Weight: 154 lb (70 kg; 11 st 0 lb)
- Position: Defence
- Shoots: Right
- Erste Liga team Former teams: DVTK Jegesmedvék; HPK; KooKoo; Gentofte Stars; HC Shakhtyor Soligorsk; Gothiques d'Amiens; Ferencvárosi TC
- NHL draft: Undrafted
- Playing career: 2009–present

Lauri Kärmeniemi (born 17 April 1991) is a Finnish professional ice hockey defenceman who currently plays for DVTK Jegesmedvék of the Erste Liga He previously played for HPK of the SM-liiga.
