= Artyom Vaszjunyin =

Ukrainian-Hungarian ice hockey player

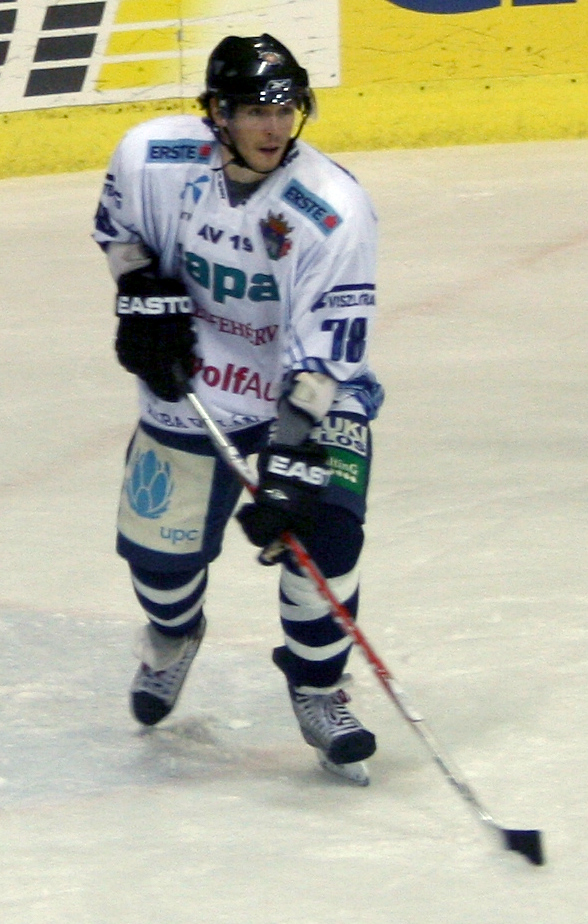
- Born: January 26, 1984 (age 41); Kiev, Ukrainian SSR, Soviet Union
- Height: 6 ft 0 in (183 cm)
- Weight: 158 lb (72 kg; 11 st 4 lb)
- Position: Right wing
- Shot: Right
- Played for: Fehérvár; Dunaújváros; Ferencváros; Debreceni HK
- National team: Hungary
- Playing career: 2000–2017

Artyom Vaszjunyin (born January 26, 1984) is a Ukrainian-Hungarian former professional ice hockey player.

== Career statistics ==
=== Austrian Hockey League ===
	Seasons	GP	Goals	Assists	Pts	PIM
Regular season	4	190	13	15	28	53
Playoffs	1	5	0	0	0	0
