= András Benk =

Hungarian ice hockey player (born 1987)

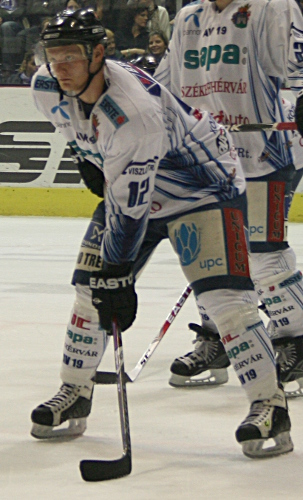
- Born: September 3, 1987 (age 39) Budapest, Hungary
- Height: 6 ft 2 in (188 cm)
- Weight: 207 lb (94 kg; 14 st 11 lb)
- Position: Left winger
- Shoots: Left
- MOL team Former teams: Újpesti TE; Dunaújvárosi Acélbikák; Alba Volán Székesfehérvár
- National team: Hungary
- Playing career: 2005–present

András Benk (born September 3, 1987) is a Hungarian professional ice hockey winger who plays for Újpesti TE in the MOL Liga. He joined after a 9-year tenure with Alba Volán Székesfehérvár in the Austrian Hockey League.

He was member of the Hungarian national team which won promotion to the top division World Championship in 2008 after seventy years of absence. Benk also made into the team in the next year, however, just in his second match of the championship, following a hit by Scottie Upshall, he suffered a broken collar bone and had to sit out the rest of the tournament.

== Awards & Achievements ==
- Hungarian Championship:
  - Winner: 2008, 2009, 2010, 2011
- IIHF World Championship Division I:
  - Winner: 2008
