= Šimon Szathmáry =

Czech ice hockey player

- Born: October 4, 1995 (age 30) Havlíčkův Brod, Czech Republic
- Height: 5 ft 10 in (178 cm)
- Weight: 171 lb (78 kg; 12 st 3 lb)
- Position: Defense
- Shoots: Right
- Erste Liga team Former teams: DVTK Jegesmedvék; Piráti Chomutov; SK Trhači Kadaň; SK Horácká Slavia Třebíč; HC Poruba 2011; HC Slavia Praha
- National team: Hungary
- Playing career: 2014–present

Šimon Szathmáry (born October 4, 1995) is a Czech-born Hungarian professional ice hockey player. He is currently playing for DVTK Jegesmedvék of the Erste Liga.

Szathmáry made his Czech Extraliga debut playing with Piráti Chomutov during the 2015-16 Czech Extraliga season.

His grandfather Jan Suchý was also an ice hockey player.
