= Elomo =

Elomo is a Finnish surname. Notable people with the surname include:

- Miika Elomo (1977–2025), Finnish ice hockey player
- Teemu Elomo (born 1979), Finnish ice hockey player, brother of Miika
