= Marklund =

Marklund is a Swedish language surname. It may refer to:

== People ==
- Anton Marklund (born 1992), Swedish racing driver
- Göran Marklund (born 1975), Swedish football player and coach
- Gunnar Marklund (1892–1964), Finnish botanist
- Hanna Marklund (born 1977), Swedish football player
- Henrik Marklund (born 1994), Swedish ice hockey player
- Liza Marklund (born 1962), Swedish writer
- Mattias Marklund (born 1974), Swedish guitarist
- Petra Marklund (born 1984), Swedish singer
- Sam Marklund (born 1993), Swedish ice hockey player

== Other uses ==
- Marklund convection, a physics process
- Marklund Motorsport, a Swedish auto racing team

== See also ==
- Markland (surname)
