= Hungarian Cup (men's ice hockey) =

National ice hockey cup competition in Hungary

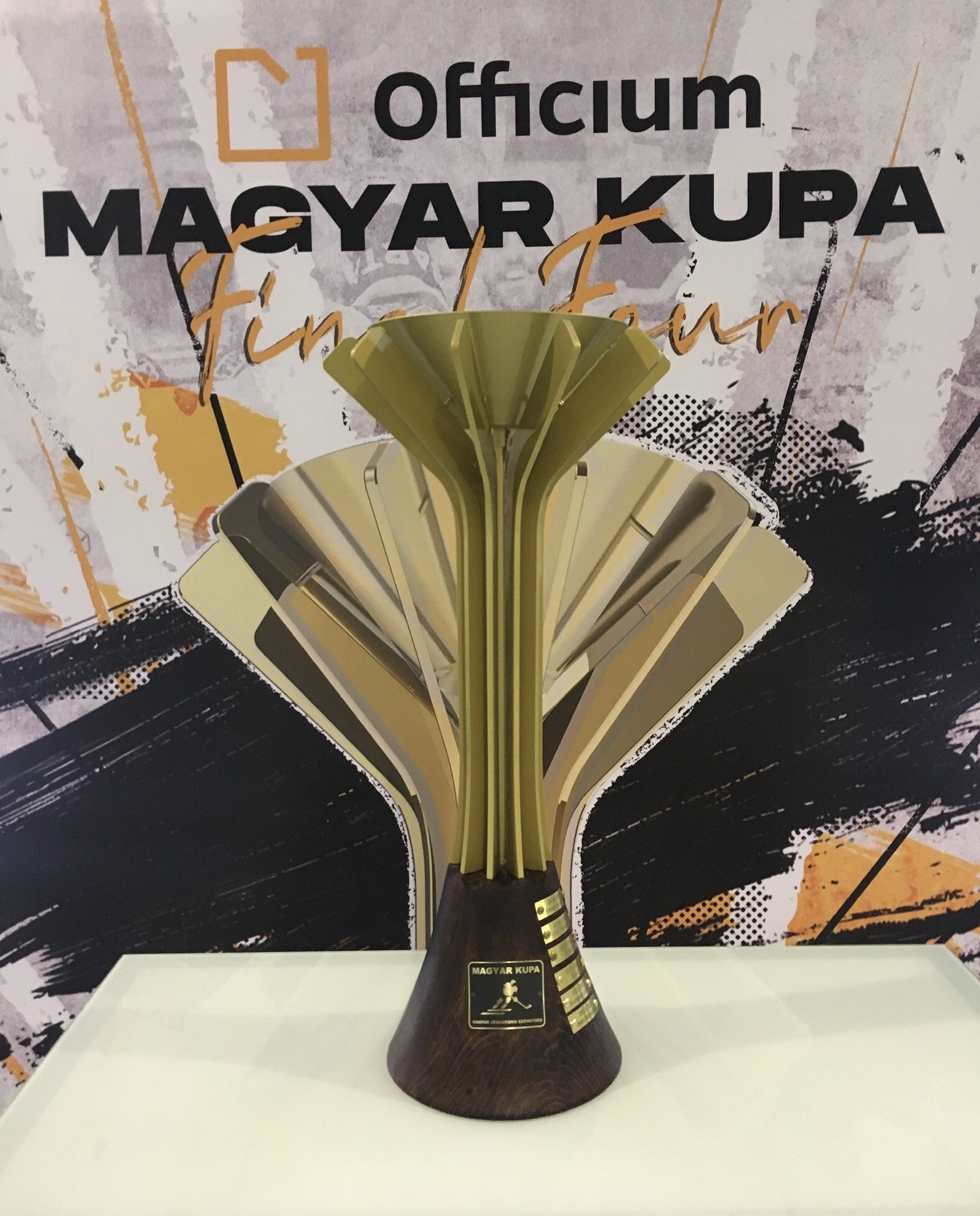
Hungarian Cup trophy

The Hungarian Cup is the national ice hockey cup competition in Hungary.

== Champions ==
Season	Winner
1965	Újpesti Dózsa SC Budapest
1966	Újpesti Dózsa SC Budapest
1968	Ferencváros TC Budapest
1969	Ferencváros TC Budapest
1970	Újpesti Dózsa SC Budapest
1971	Újpesti Dózsa SC Budapest
1972	Újpesti Dózsa SC Budapest
1973	Ferencváros TC Budapest
1974	Ferencváros TC Budapest
1975	Ferencváros TC Budapest
1976	Ferencváros TC Budapest
1977	Ferencváros TC Budapest
1979	Ferencváros TC Budapest
1980	Ferencváros TC Budapest
1983	Ferencváros TC Budapest
1986	Újpesti Dózsa SC Budapest
1986	Újpesti Dózsa SC Budapest
1988	Újpesti Dózsa SC Budapest
1990	Ferencváros TC Budapest
1991	Ferencváros TC Budapest
1992	Ferencváros TC Budapest
1993	Lehel HC Jászberény
1994	Alba Volán Székesfehérvár
1995	Ferencváros TC Budapest
1996	Dunaferr SE Dunaújváros
1997	Dunaferr SE Dunaújváros
1998	Alba Volán Székesfehérvár
1998	Dunaferr SE Dunaújváros
2000	Alba Volán Székesfehérvár
2001	Dunaferr SE Dunaújváros
2002	Dunaferr SE Dunaújváros
2003	Dunaferr SE Dunaújváros
2004	Dunaferr SE Dunaújváros
2005	Alba Volán Székesfehérvár
2007	Alba Volán Székesfehérvár
2008	Dunaújvárosi Acélbikák
2009	Dunaújvárosi Acélbikák
2010	Dunaújvárosi Acélbikák
2011	Dunaújvárosi Acélbikák
2012	Dunaújvárosi Acélbikák
2013	Sapa Fehérvár AV19
2014	Dunaújvárosi Acélbikák-Docler
2015	Miskolci Jegesmedvék JSE
2016	Fehérvár AV19
2017	MAC Budapest
2018	DVTK Jegesmedvék
2019	Fehérvár AV19
2020	Ferencváros TC Budapest
