= 2014–15 MOL Liga season =

2014–15 MOL Season
- League: MOL Liga
- Sport: Ice hockey
- Duration: 17 September 2014 – February 1, 2015 (Regular season); February 10, 2015 – March 3, 2015 (Playoff Semifinals, Final)
- Teams: 8
- TV partner: DigiSport

Regular season

Playoffs

MOL Liga seasons
- ← 2013–14 2015-16 →

The 2014–15 MOL Liga season was the seventh season of the MOL Liga. The league was a multi-national ice hockey league consisting of teams from Hungary, Romania, and Slovakia. HC Nové Zámky were the defending Champions after defeating ASC Corona Braşov in the 2014 Championship.

== Team information ==
Team	City	Arena	Capacity
ASC Corona Braşov	(Romania) Braşov	Patinoarul Olimpic Brașov	2,200
HSC Csíkszereda	(Romania) Csíkszereda	Vakár Lajos Műjégpálya	2,500
Dab.Docler	(Hungary) Dunaújváros	Dunaújvárosi Jégcsarnok	4,500
Debreceni Hoki Klub	(Hungary) Debrecen	Debreceni Jégcsarnok	750
Ferencváros	(Hungary) Budapest	Pesterzsébeti Jégcsarnok	1,500
Miskolci JJSE	(Hungary) Miskolc	Miskolci Jégcsarnok	2,000
HC Nové Zámky	(Slovakia) Nové Zámky	Zimný štadión Nové Zámky	3,000
UTE	(Hungary) Budapest	Megyeri úti Jégcsarnok	2,200

== Regular season ==
=== Standings ===
Rank	Team	GP	W	OTW	OTL	L	Goals	Diff.	Pts
1	Miskolci Jegesmedvék	42	24	7	3	8	178:88	+90	89
2	Dab.Docler	42	25	6	1	10	141:108	+33	88
3	HC Nové Zámky	42	21	5	3	13	171:137	+34	76
4	ASC Corona Brașov	42	20	2	10	10	139:123	+16	74
5	Debreceni HK	42	16	3	4	19	132:134	–2	58
6	Újpesti TE	42	12	4	4	22	122:175	–53	48
7	Ferencvárosi TC	42	12	3	4	23	114:151	–37	46
8	HSC Csíkszereda	42	4	4	5	29	101:182	–81	25

== See also ==
- MOL Liga
- 2014 in ice hockey
- 2015 in ice hockey
