= 1996–97 OB I bajnoksag season =

Hungarian ice hockey season

The 1996–97 OB I bajnokság season was the 60th season of the OB I bajnokság, the top level of ice hockey in Hungary. Five teams participated in the league, and Ferencvarosi TC won the championship.

== Regular season ==
	Club	GP	W	T	L	Goals	Pts
1.	Dunaferr Dunaújváros	28	22	2	4	182:43	46
2.	Ferencvárosi TC	28	19	3	6	141:74	41
3.	Alba Volán Székesfehérvár	28	17	2	9	145:69	36
4.	Tisza Volán HC Szeged	28	6	3	19	83:122	15
5.	Újpesti TE	28	0	2	26	47:280	2

== Final ==
- Dunaferr Dunaújváros - Ferencvárosi TC 0:2 (3:4 SO, 1:5)
