= Balázs Gőz =

Hungarian ice hockey player

- Born: 3 August 1992 (age 33) Miskolc, Hungary
- Height: 181 cm (5 ft 11 in)
- Weight: 86 kg (190 lb; 13 st 8 lb)
- Position: Defenceman
- Catches: Left
- Slovak team Former teams: DVTK Jegesmedvék; Pingouins de Morzine-Avoriaz; Roanoke Rail Yard Dawgs; Norfolk Admirals
- National team: Hungary
- Playing career: 2008–present

Balázs Gőz; born 3 August 1992 in Miskolc) is a Hungarian professional ice hockey defenceman who plays for DVTK Jegesmedvék in the Slovak Extraliga.
