= Henrik Marklund =

Swedish ice hockey player

- Born: June 25, 1994 (age 31) Skellefteå, Sweden
- Height: 5 ft 11 in (180 cm)
- Weight: 174 lb (79 kg; 12 st 6 lb)
- Position: Right wing
- Shoots: Left
- Erste Liga team Former teams: DVTK Jegesmedvék; Skellefteå AIK; Mörrums GoIS IK; Grästorps IK; IFK Arboga IK; Asplöven HC; AIK IF; Almtuna IS; Hudiksvalls HC; Östersunds IK
- NHL draft: Undrafted
- Playing career: 2013–present

Henrik Marklund (born June 25, 1994) is a Swedish ice hockey player. He is currently playing with DVTK Jegesmedvék of the Erste Liga.

Marklund made his Swedish Hockey League debut playing with Skellefteå AIK during the 2013–14 SHL season.
