= Balázs Ladányi =

Hungarian ice hockey player (born 1976)

- Born: 6 January 1976 (age 50) Dunaújváros, Hungary
- Height: 5 ft 11 in (180 cm)
- Weight: 194 lb (88 kg; 13 st 12 lb)
- Shot: Left wing
- Played for: Dunaújvárosi Acélbikák; Újpesti TE; Diables Rouges de Briançon; Alba Volán Székesfehérvár; HC Bolzano; Debreceni Hoki Klub
- National team: Hungary
- Playing career: 1994–2016

Balázs Ladányi (born 6 January 1976) is a Hungarian former professional ice hockey left winger.

Ladányi played for Dunaújvárosi Acélbikák, Újpesti TE, Diables Rouges de Briançon, Alba Volán Székesfehérvár, HC Bolzano and Debreceni Hoki Klub. He also played for the Hungary national team and played in the 2009 IIHF World Championship.

== Career statistics ==
=== Austrian Hockey League ===
| | Seasons | GP | G | A | Pts | PIM |
|---|---|---|---|---|---|---|
| Regular season | 2 | 106 | 35 | 73 | 108 | 32 |
| Playoffs | 1 | 5 | 0 | 5 | 5 | 6 |
