= Jan Kruliš =

Czech ice hockey defenceman

- Born: October 3, 1969 (age 55); Kladno, Czechoslovakia
- Height: 6 ft 0 in (183 cm)
- Weight: 214 lb (97 kg; 15 st 4 lb)
- Position: Defence
- Shot: Right
- Played for: HC Kladno; HC Sparta Praha; Furukawa Ice Hockey Club; EHC Linz; Nottingham Panthers; Újpesti TE
- National team: Czech Republic
- Playing career: 1989–2011

Jan Kruliš (born October 3, 1969) is a Czech former professional ice hockey defenceman.

Kruliš played in the Czechoslovak First Ice Hockey League and the Czech Extraliga for HC Kladno and HC Sparta Praha. He also played in the Japan Ice Hockey League for Furukawa Ice Hockey Club, the Austrian Hockey League for EHC Linz and the Elite Ice Hockey League for the Nottingham Panthers.
