= HK Beograd =

- City: Belgrade, Serbia
- League: MOL Liga; 2016-2017
- Founded: 2016
- Home arena: Ledena dvorana Pionir (capacity: 2000)
- Colours
- Head coach: Nemanja Jankovic
- Website: http://www.hkb.rs/

Franchise history
- HK Beograd

HK Beograd were a Serbian ice hockey team that currently played in the Eastern European MOL Liga for one season. Their home arena was Ledena dvorana Pionir in Belgrade, Serbia. The club's inaugural season was the 2016/17 MOL Liga season, in which they finished in 1st place. They would also win the Serbian Cup in their first season, giving the team their first domestic trophy.

== Honours ==
- Serbian Hockey League
  - Winners (1): 2017
