= Timo Lindström =

Finnish ice hockey player

- Born: April 9, 1986 (age 40) Helsinki, Finland
- Height: 6 ft 0 in (183 cm)
- Weight: 181 lb (82 kg; 12 st 13 lb)
- Position: Goaltender
- Caught: Right
- Played for: KalPa; HPK
- Playing career: 2005–2012

Timo Lindström (born April 9, 1986) is a Finnish former professional ice hockey goaltender.

Lindström played three games in the SM-liiga, two for KalPa during the 2005–06 season and one for HPK during the 2007–08 season.
