= Debreceni Hoki Klub =

Debreceni HK
- City: Debrecen, Hungary
- League: MOL Liga; 2014-2017
- Founded: 1989
- Home arena: Debrecen Ice Hall (capacity: 700)
- Colours
- Head coach: (Canada) Jason Morgan
- Captain: (Hungary) Artyom Vaszjunyin
- Website: http://www.debrecenihoki.hu/

Franchise history
- Debreceni Hoki Klub

Debreceni HK is a Hungarian ice hockey team that currently plays in the OB I bajnokság. They play their home games at Debrecen Ice Hall, located in Debrecen.

== Current roster ==
Current roster (as of March 2, 2017):

Goaltenders
Number		Player	Catches	Born	Place of birth
68	(Hungary)	Dávid Gyenes	L	18.11.1992
31	(Hungary)	Péter Nagy	L	01.09.1997
30	(Hungary)	József Pleszkán	L	30.06.1993	Budapest, Hungary

Defensemen
Number		Player	Shoots	Born	Place of birth
3	(Russia)	Artyom Bezrukov	L	01.08.1982	Izhevsk, Soviet Union
29	(Hungary)	Krisztofer Darabos	R	29.08.1998
52	(Hungary)	Jesse Dudas	R	31.03.1988	St. Albert, Alberta, Canada
12	(Romania)	Tihamér Győrfy	L	01.04.1997	Gheorgheni, Romania
2	(Hungary)	Péter Hetényi	L	27.01.1991
91	(Hungary)	László Pados	L	11.09.1995	Székesfehérvár, Hungary
98	(Hungary)	Denis Popkov	L	14.01.1997
98	(Russia)	Valeri Sadikov	L	19.03.1991
72	(Canada)	Brad Smith	L	14.04.1988	Summerside, Prince Edward Island, Canada
13	(Hungary)	Arnold Varga – A	L	19.06.1992	Dunaújváros, Hungary
24	(Hungary)	Zsolt Wéber	L	31.07.1990

Forwards
Number		Player	Shoots	Born	Place of birth
51	(Hungary)	Ákos Berta	L	09.12.1987
11	(United States)	Jared Brown	R	21.02.1986	Gardner, Kansas, United States
27	(Hungary)	Norbert Dancsfalvi	L	10.07.1990	Budapest, Hungary
33	(Hungary)	Dániel Godó	L	12.01.1995
16	(Hungary)	Norbert Hári	R	28.09.1995
10	(Russia)	Alexei Kosourov – A	L	29.06.1979	Penza, Soviet Union
98	(Russia)	Vladislav Kuleshov	L	30.06.1998	Yaroslavl, Russia
44	(Hungary)	Dávid Molnár	L	19.06.1998
6	(Hungary)	Attila Németh	L	12.10.1992
14	(Russia)	Sergei Piskunov	r	31.03.1981	Magnitogorsk, Soviet Union
18	(Slovakia)	Martin Saluga	L	18.10.1982	Spišská Nová Ves, Czechoslovakia
28	(Canada)	Jesse Schultz	R	28.09.1982	Strasbourg, Saskatchewan, Canada
90	(Hungary)	Levente Szilágyi	L	06.12.1990
44	(Hungary)	Artyom Szokolov	L	14.03.1998	Debrecen, Hungary
78	(Hungary)	Artyom Vaszjunyin – C	R	26.01.1984	Kyiv, Soviet Union
19	(Hungary)	Péter Vincze	L	17.03.1996
