= HC Nové Zámky =

- City: Nové Zámky, Slovakia
- League: Slovenská hokejová liga
- Founded: 1965
- Home arena: Nové Zámky Ice Stadium (capacity 4500, only 2000 seats)
- Colours: Green, white, black
- President: František Sucharda
- General manager: Patrik Koči
- Head coach: Juraj Štefanka
- Captain: Karol Korím
- Website: hcnovezamky.eu

HC Nové Zámky is a professional ice hockey team playing in the Slovenská hokejová liga, the second-level league in Slovakia. The team is based in the town of Nové Zámky, Slovakia at Nové Zámky Ice Stadium. The team is nicknamed Býci, meaning "Bulls" in English.

== History ==
History of ice hockey in Nové Zámky started in 1937. In 1965, the team was founded as Lokomotíva Nové Zámky. Lokomotíva played in 2. Slovak National Hockey League until 1993, when, following the dissolution of Czechoslovakia, Lokomotíva was moved to newly established Slovak 2. Liga. During season 2006/07, Lokomotíva played in Hungarian Borsodi Liga. Next year club have won the 2. Liga and qualified to Slovak 1. Liga, but after 3 seasons, Lokomotíva was relegated to Slovak 2. Liga. In 2011, current team HC Nové Zámky was created and replaced Lokomotíva Nové Zámky in Slovak 2. Liga, where they ended on 6th place in group West. In season 2012/13, Nové Zámky joined international MOL Liga, where they managed to reach semi-finals from 4th place, but lost to HSC Csíkszereda 3–0 on aggregate. In the 2013–14 season, Nové Zámky ended in basic part on 2nd place with 90 points, just behind champion from last season, Dunaújvárosi Acélbikák. In semi-final, Nové Zámky defeated 4th team, Miskolci Jegesmedvék JSE 1–3 on aggregate and for the first time, team managed to qualify to MOL Liga Finals. There, Nové Zámky confronted ASC Corona Brașov, which defeated DAB. Docler in semi-finals. Nové Zámky have won 4–2 on aggregate and became first and only Slovak team to won MOL Liga title. Next season 2014–15 they lost in final with DVTK Jegesmedvék, 0–4 in series. In the same season, team won the lowest league in Slovakia Slovak 2. Liga against MHK Humenné and qualify to Slovak 1. Liga. In first season of the second level of ice hockey in the country, they ended in basic part on 2nd place with 90 points behind HC 46 Bardejov. Nové Zámky then defeated in quarterfinals HC Dukla Senica 3–1 on aggregate, in semi-finals HK 32 Liptovský Mikuláš 3–0 on aggregate and in finals HC 46 Bardejov 3–2 on aggregate and won a title 2015–16 season.

== Honours ==
=== Domestic ===
Slovak 1. Liga

- (gold) Winners (1): 2015–16

Slovak 2. Liga

- (gold) Winners (1): 2014–15
- (silver) Runners-up (1): 2004–05

=== International ===
Erste Liga

- (gold) Winners (1): 2013–14
- (silver) Runners-up (1): 2014–15

== Players ==
=== Current roster ===
As of 24 November 2024.

No.	Nat	Player	Pos	S/G	Age	Acquired	Birthplace
–	(Finland)	Christopher Gibson	G	L	33	2024	Karkkila, Finland
30	(United States)	Jason Grande	G	L	26	2024	West Chester, Pennsylvania, United States
81	(Slovakia)	Lukáš Handlovský	RW	R	39	2024	Banská Bystrica, Czechoslovakia
88	(Canada)	Jayce Hawryluk	RW	R	30	2024	Yorkton, Saskatchewan, Canada
14	(Slovakia)	Dominik Jendek	C	L	24	2024	Bratislava, Slovakia
15	(Slovakia)	David Kodhaj	F	L	20	2024	Nové Zámky, Slovakia
9	(Slovakia)	Hugo Kováč	RW	L	25	2023	Nitra, Slovakia
10	(Canada)	Shawn Lalonde	D	R	35	2024	Orleans, Ontario, Canada
90	(Slovakia)	Adam Lapšanský	LW	L	35	2024	Spišská Nová Ves, Czechoslovakia
36	(Slovakia)	Branislav Ligas	D	R	26	2025	Martin, Slovakia
93	(Slovakia)	Jakub Linet	C	L	35	2024	Žilina, Czechoslovakia
4	(Slovakia)	Patrik Luža	D	R	31	2024	Bratislava, Slovakia
18	(Finland)	Kalle Maalahti	D	L	34	2024	Lappeenranta, Finland
19	(Slovakia)	Áron Meszáros	D	R	19	2023	Hamuliakovo, Slovakia
83	(Slovakia)	Peter Novajovský (A)	D	L	36	2023	Bratislava, Czechoslovakia
97	(Slovakia)	Richard Ondrušek (A)	D	L	28	2020	Nové Zámky, Slovakia
25	(United States)	William Rapuzzi	C	R	35	2024	Anchorage, Alaska, United States
21	(Canada)	Nick Ritchie	LW	L	30	2024	Orangeville, Ontario, Canada
5	(Slovakia)	Michal Roman	D	L	28	2020	Kysucké Nové Mesto, Slovakia
44	(Slovakia)	Jakub Ružek	LW	L	21	2023	Jablonec, Slovakia
32	(Slovakia)	Roman Rychlík	G	R	25	2024	Trebišov, Slovakia
17	(Slovakia)	Martin Semanak	D	L	25	2024	Kežmarok, Slovakia
85	(Slovakia)	Marek Slovák (C)	C	L	37	2024	Nitra, Czechoslovakia
70	(Canada)	Christian Thomas	RW	R	33	2024	Toronto, Ontario, Canada
–	(Slovakia)	Jakub Urbanek	C	R	26	2024	Martin, Slovakia
