= Ifjabb Ocskay Gábor Ice Hall =

Coordinates: 47.1856°N 18.4481°E

- Interactive map of Ifjabb Ocskay Gábor Ice Hall
- Location: Raktár u. 1., 8000 Székesfehérvár
- Capacity: 3,500

Construction
- Opened: 1991

Tenant
- Fehérvár AV19 (ICEHL)

Ifjabb Ocskay Gábor Ice Hall is an indoor sporting arena in Székesfehérvár, Hungary. The arena has a capacity of 3,500 people and was opened in 1991. It is home to the Fehérvár AV19 ice hockey team, who play in the Austrian Hockey League. The hall is named after Alba Volán's legendary player, Gábor Ocskay, who died in 2009.
