= Budapest Stars =

Hungarian ice hockey team

- City: Budapest, Hungary
- League: OB I bajnokság 2001-present MOL Liga; 2008-present
- Founded: 2001
- Colors: Red, navy, white
- Head coach: Glen Williamson
- Website: www.bpstars.hu

Franchise history
- 2001-present: Budapest Stars

Budapest Stars is a Hungarian ice hockey team that currently plays in the OB I bajnokság and in the MOL Liga. They play their home games at Budapest Icecenter, located in Budapest.
