= CSM Corona Brașov (ice hockey) =

Ice hockey team in Brașov, Romania

- City: Brașov
- League: Romanian Hockey League (2007–present); Erste Liga (2009–present)
- Founded: 2007
- Home arena: Brașov Olympic Ice Rink (capacity: 2,000)
- Colours
- President: Marius Gliga
- General manager: Árpád Mihály
- Head coach: Dave MacQueen
- Asst. coach: Hunor Strenk
- Captain: Radim Valchar

CSM Corona Brașov, founded in 2007 as Sport Club Municipal Fenestela 68, is a professional ice hockey team in Brașov, Romania. The club has won six league titles and one Erste Liga title.

== History ==
The team has registered to play in the Romanian national league in 2008 and in the Erste Liga in 2009.

They won the 2012 Romanian Cup after winning the final against HSC Csíkszereda and were runners-up in the 2010–11 and 2011–12 editions of the Romanian national league and the 2008, 2010 and 2011 editions of the Romanian Cup. In 2013–14, Corona Wolves Brasov won the Romanian National League and run up in the 2014 edition of the Continental Cup. Also in the 2013–2014 season they were vice champions of the MOL League after beating DAB Docler (the champion of the 2012–13 edition, from Hungary) in the semifinals and lost against Nove Zamky (Slovakia) in the finals.

In the 2014–15 season, they won once again the Romanian Cup against HSC Csíkszereda and play in the finals of the Romanian National League. Corona Wolves Brașov are qualified in the playoffs of the MOL League of 2014–15 edition.

As the veteran Arpad Mihaly finished his playing career in Brasov, the organisation decided to retire his number, the number 24.

== Achievements ==
- National League:
  - Winners (6): 2013–14, 2016–17, 2018–19, 2020-21, 2022-23, 2023-24
  - Runners-up (3): 2010–11, 2011–12, 2012–13
- Romanian Cup:
  - Winners (5): 2012–13, 2014–15, 2020–21, 2023–24, 2025–26
  - Runners-up (8): 2008–09, 2010–11, 2011–12, 2013–14, 2017–18, 2018–19, 2024–25, 2026–27
- Erste Liga:
  - Winners (1): 2023–24
  - Runners-up (2): 2013-14, 2020–21
- Continental Cup:
  - Runners-up (1): 2014

== Venue ==
Corona play on the Olympic Ice Rink (Romanian: Patinoarul Olimpic) in the city. It was inaugurated in January 2010 and can usually host more than 1,500 people in seats; It is located at no. 5 Turnului street, which is 5 minutes walking distance from the railway station and easily accessible by public transportation.
