= Erste Liga (ice hockey) =

International ice hockey league in Eastern Europe

- Current season, competition or edition: 2025–26 Erste Liga season
- Formerly: MOL Liga, 2008–2017
- Sport: Ice hockey
- Founded: 2008
- First season: 2008–09
- No. of teams: 9
- Countries: Hungary (6 teams); Romania (3 teams)
- Most recent champion: Gyergyói HK (2025–26)
- Most titles: HSC Csíkszereda (4 titles)
- Related competitions: Magyar Kupa; OB I Bajnokság; Cupa României; Liga Națională; ICE Hockey League
- Website: ersteliga.hu

The Erste Liga is an international ice hockey league organized for clubs based in Hungary and Romania. It was founded in 2008 as the MOL Liga and was so known until being renamed Erste Liga in 2017 due to a sponsorship agreement with Erste Bank Hungary.

Games played between Hungarian teams count towards the Hungarian national championship league, the OB I Bajnokság, and games played between Romanian teams count towards the Romanian national championship league, the Liga Națională.

The last 6* seasons have been won by Romanian teams: HSC Csíkszereda three times, Gyergyói HK twice and CSM Corona Brașov once.
* The season 2019–20 (Covid) recognized both (Hungary) Ferencvárosi TC and (Romania) HSC Csíkszereda as winners.

== History ==
In the first season, the league comprised six Hungarian teams and four Romanian teams. HC Csíkszereda went undefeated in the post-season to win the first MOL Liga title.

In 2009–10, the number of teams went down to five Hungarian and two Romanian teams. Following the regular season, they decided the winner in a final four system. The Budapest Stars met Újpesti TE in the final, after they beat SC Csíkszereda and DAB-Docler, respectively. Újpest started the match better, taking the lead just after one and a half minutes. However, the events took a U-turn and about two hours later, it was the Budapest Stars who lifted the trophy, after winning the match 3–1.

The 2010–11 MOL Liga season was the third edition of the international ice hockey championship for teams from Hungary and Romania. This season, nine teams participated, including defending champions Vasas Budapest Stars, the second team of Erste Bank Eishockey Liga outfit SAPA AV19 Székesfehérvár, and HSC Csíkszereda from Miercurea Ciuc

The 2011–12 MOL Liga season was the fourth edition of the international ice hockey championship for teams from Hungary and Romania. Following the withdrawal of Vasas HC, the field is composed of eight clubs this season, including five Hungarian and three Romanian. The regular season ran from 6 September 2011 to 20 January 2012. After the conclusion of the regular season, the six best ranked teams won the right to participate in the playoffs. The top two clubs had byes in the first round of the playoffs, while the remaining four teams were drawn together according to their final position in the regular season (3–6, 4–5). The winners of the match-ups advanced to the semifinals, where they met DAB-Docler and HSC Csíkszereda, respectively. Eventually, Miskolci JJSE beat HSC Csíkszereda and thus secured their spot in the finals, where they faced Dunaújváros, which won their duel in straight matches against Corona Fenestela Braşov. Dunaújváros enjoyed the home ice advantage in the best-of-seven series final, where they swept away Miskolc 4–0 and took the 2011–12 MOL Liga title, the first ever of its kind in the history of the club.

The 2012–13 MOL Liga season was the fifth season of the MOL Liga, a multi-national ice hockey league consisting of teams from Hungary, Romania, and Slovakia. Seven teams participated in the league, and DAB-Docler won the championship. The league also served as the Hungarian Championship for 2012–13. DAB-Docler, the MOL Liga champion, was also the Hungarian national champion.

The 2013–14 MOL Liga season was the sixth season of the MOL Liga, and HC Nové Zámky won the title. The league is a multi-national ice hockey league consisting of teams from Hungary, Romania, and Slovakia. Balázs Ladányi from DAB-Docler was the season's leading scorer with 63 points.

The 2014–15 MOL Liga season was the seventh season of the MOL Liga. The league is a multi-national ice hockey league consisting of teams from Hungary, Romania, and Slovakia. HC Nové Zámky were the defending Champions after defeating ASC Corona Braşov in the 2014 Championship, but they lost their championship to Miskolci Jegesmedvék in a 4–0 sweep against them.

The 2015–16 MOL Liga season was the 8th season of the MOL Liga. DVTK Jegesmedvék was the defending champion after defeating HC Nové Zámky in the 2014–2015 season. They successfully defended their title after sweeping MAC Budapest in the finals. The league is a multi-national ice hockey league consisting of teams from Hungary and Romania. A new team, Budapest based MAC Budapest, joined the league while Slovak based, and previous season's finalist, HC Nové Zámky left.

The 2016–17 MOL Liga season was the 9th season of the MOL Liga. DVTK Jegesmedvék was the two-time defending champion after defeating MAC Budapest in the 2015–2016 season. They once again successfully defended their title after beating MAC Budapest in the finals, this time in 5 games (4–1). A new team from Serbia, the Belgrade based HK Beograd, joined the league.

In July 2017, MOL, who was formerly the league's naming sponsor, decided against renewing their sponsorship. From the 2017–18 season onwards, the league will be known as the Erste Liga. DVTK Jegesmedvék is the three-time defending champion after defeating MAC Budapest in the 2016–2017 season. A new team from Austria, the second team of Erste Bank Eishockey Liga outfit Vienna Capitals, joined the league while three clubs, Hungarian based Debreceni HK, Romanian based Dunărea Galați and Serbian based HK Beograd, all left the league.

== Teams ==
Location of teams in Hungary participating in the 2025–26 Erste Liga season
Location of teams in Romania participating in the 2025–26 Erste Liga season

The departure of Ferencvárosi TC to the ICE Hockey League following the 2024–25 season left nine teams to participate in the 2025–26 Erste Liga season, six from Hungary and three from Romania.

Team	City	Arena	Capacity	Founded	Joined league	Left league
2025–26 teams
Budapest Jégkorong Akadémia HC	(Hungary) Budapest	Vasas Jégcentrum	1,500	2015	2015–16; 2020–21	2018–19
Corona Brașov	(Romania) Brașov	Patinoarul Olimpic Brașov	1,604	2007	2009–10	
DEAC	(Hungary) Debrecen	Debreceni Jégcsarnok	600	1989	2018–19	
DVTK Jegesmedvék	(Hungary) Miskolc	Miskolci Jégcsarnok	2,200	1978	2021–22	
Dunaújvárosi Acélbikák	(Hungary) Dunaújváros	Dunaújvárosi Jégcsarnok	4,500	1974	2008–09	
FEHA19	(Hungary) Székesfehérvár	Ifjabb Ocskay Gábor Ice Hall	3,600	2008	2008–09	
Gyergyói Hoki Klub	(Romania) Gheorgheni	Remetea Ice Arena	1,000	1949	2008–09	
Sport Club Csíkszereda	(Romania) Miercurea Ciuc	Patinoarul Lajos Vákár	3,500	1929	2008–09	
UTE	(Hungary) Budapest	Megyeri úti Jégcsarnok	2,000	1955 (1930)	2008–09	
Former Teams (since introduction of current league format)
HC Csíkszereda	(Romania) Miercurea Ciuc	Patinoarul Lajos Vákár	3,500	2002	2008–09	2008–09
Budapest Stars (Vasas)	(Hungary) Budapest	Jégpalota Budapest	2,000	2001	2008–09	2010–11
Steaua Rangers	(Romania) Bucharest	Patinoarul Mihai Flamaropol	8,000	1951	2008–09	2011–12
HC Nové Zámky	(Slovakia) Nové Zámky	Zimný štadión Nové Zámky	3,500	1965	2012–13	2014–15
Debreceni HK	(Hungary) Debrecen	Debreceni Jégcsarnok	600	1989	2014–15	2016–17
Dunărea Galați	(Romania) Galați	Patinoarul Galați	5,000	1932	2016–17	2016–17
HK Beograd	(Serbia) Belgrade	Ice Palace Pionir	2,000	2016	2016–17	2016–17
Vienna Capitals (II.)	(Austria) Vienna	Albert Schultz Eishalle	7,022	2001	2017–18	2018–19
Hokiklub Budapest	(Hungary) Budapest	Tüskecsarnok	2,540		2018–19	2019–20
Ferencvárosi TC	(Hungary) Budapest	Pesterzsébeti Jégcsarnok	2,400	1928	2008–09	2024–25

== Champions ==
Season	Winner	Final (matches won)	Runner-up
2008–09	(Romania) HC Csíkszereda	3–0	(Romania) SC Csíkszereda
2009–10	(Hungary) Budapest Stars	3–1	(Hungary) Újpesti TE
2010–11	(Romania) HSC Csíkszereda	4–1	(Hungary) DAB-Docler
2011–12	(Hungary) DAB-Docler	4–0	(Hungary) Miskolci JJSE
2012–13	(Hungary) DAB-Docler	4–2	(Romania) HSC Csíkszereda
2013–14	(Slovakia) HC Mikron Nové Zámky	4–2	(Romania) Corona Wolves Braşov
2014–15	(Hungary) Miskolci Jegesmedvék	4–0	(Slovakia) HC Mikron Nové Zámky
2015–16	(Hungary) DVTK Jegesmedvék	4–0	(Hungary) MAC Budapest
2016–17	(Hungary) DVTK Jegesmedvék	4–1	(Hungary) MAC Budapest
2017–18	(Hungary) MAC Budapest	4–1	(Hungary) DVTK Jegesmedvék
2018–19	(Hungary) Ferencvárosi TC	4–1	(Romania) HSC Csíkszereda
2019–20	(Hungary) Ferencvárosi TC and (Romania) HSC Csíkszereda	Was not played	–
2020–21	(Romania) HSC Csíkszereda	4–2	(Romania) Corona Brașov
2021–22	(Romania) HSC Csíkszereda	4–1	(Hungary) Ferencvárosi TC
2022–23	(Romania) Gyergyói HK	4–3	(Hungary) Ferencvárosi TC
2023–24	(Romania) Corona Brașov	4–0	(Hungary) Ferencvárosi TC
2024–25	(Romania) Gyergyói HK	4–2	(Romania) HSC Csíkszereda
2025–26	(Romania) Gyergyói HK	4–1	(Romania) Corona Brașov

=== All-time standings ===
Club	No.	09	10	11	12	13	14	15	16	17	18	19	20	21	22	23	24	25	26
Dunaújvárosi Acélbikák^{4}	18	5	3	2	1	1	3	3	8	6	5	10	5	10	11	7	9	10	9
HSC Csíkszereda^{3}	18	2	4	1	3	2	5	8	7	11	4	2	1^{(Covid)}	1	1	6	4	2	7
Újpesti TE	18	3	2	8	8	7	7	6	5	3	6	3	3^{(Covid)}	6	5	10	6	8	5
Ferencvárosi TC	17	7	5	5	5	6	6	7	6	7	7	1	1^{(Covid)}	3	2	2	2	6	
Corona Brașov^{5}	17		7	6	4	5	2	4	9	5	3	5	6	2	7	4	1	4	2
DVTK Jegesmedvék^{1}	15	9	6	3	2	3	4	1	1	1	2				8	5	7	7	3
FEHA19^{2}	14	10		7	7				3	8	8	6	8	9	10	8	10	9	8
MAC Budapest	9								2	2	1			5	6	3	5	3	4
Gyergyói HK	9	8										7	3^{(Covid)}	7	3	1	3	1	1
Debreceni EAC	8											4	7	4	4	9	8	5	6
Debreceni HK	3							5	4	4									
Steaua Rangers^{7}	3	6		9	6														
Vasas HC	3											11	9	8					
HC Nové Zámky^{6}	3					4	1	2											
Budapest Stars^{8}	3	4	1	4															
HC Csíkszereda	1	1																	
Vienna Capitals (II.)	2										9	8							
Dunărea Galați	1									9									
KMH Budapest	1											9	10						
UNI Győr ETO HC	1																	9	
HK Beograd	1									10									

Color code	Result
Gold	Champion
Silver	Finalist
Green	Semi-finalist
Purple	Quarter-finalist
Blue	Pre-qualifying
White	not qualified for play-offs
Red	Folded during regular season
No.	Number of seasons in league (as of 2017–18)

- ^{1} Played as Miskolci Jegesmedvék JSE (Miskolci JJSE) from 2008–09 to 2014–15.
- ^{2} Played as Alba Volán Székesfehérvár 2 from 2008–09 to 2009–10 and as SAPA Fehérvár AV19 2 from 2010–11 to 2015–16.
- ^{3} Played as SC Miercurea Ciuc from 2008–09 to 2009–10.
- ^{4} Played as DAB-Docler from 2008–09 to 2014–15.
- ^{5} Played as SCM Fenestela 68 Brașov from 2008–09 to 2010–11, as Corona Fenestela Brașov from 2011–12 to 2012–13 and as Corona Brașov Wolves from 2013–14 to 2014–15.
- ^{6} Also known as HC Mikron Nové Zámky during time in league from 2012–13 to 2014–15.
- ^{7} Played as Steaua București from 2008–09 to 2009–10.
- ^{8} Played as Vasas HC Budapest Stars from 2008–09 to 2010–11.

== Hungarian champions ==
- 1937: Budapesti KE
- 1937/38: Budapesti KE (2)
- 1938/39: Budapesti KE (3)
- 1939/40: Budapesti KE (4)
- 1940/41: BBTE
- 1941/42: Budapesti KE (5)
- 1942/43: BBTE (2)
- 1943/44: Budapesti KE (6)
- 1944/45: Not held
- 1945/46: Budapesti KE (7)
- 1946/47: MTK Budapest
- 1947/48: MTK Budapest (2)
- 1948/49: MTK Budapest (3)
- 1949/50: Bp. Vörös Meteor
- 1950/51: Bp. Kinizsi
- 1951/52: Bp. Vörös Meteor (2)
- 1952/53: Bp. Postás
- 1953/54: Bp. Postás (2)
- 1954/55: Bp. Kinizsi (2)
- 1955/56: Bp. Kinizsi (3)
- 1956/57: Bp. Vörös Meteor (3)
- 1957/58: Újpesti Dózsa
- 1958/59: Bp. Vörös Meteor (4)
- 1959/60: Újpest (2)
- 1960/61: Ferencvárosi TC (4)
- 1961/62: Ferencvárosi TC (5)
- 1962/63: Bp. Vörös Meteor (5)
- 1963/64: Ferencvárosi TC (6)
- 1964/65: Újpesti Dózsa (3)
- 1965/66: Újpesti Dózsa (4)
- 1966/67: Ferencvárosi TC (7)
- 1967/68: Újpesti Dózsa (5)
- 1968/69: Újpesti Dózsa (6)
- 1969/70: Újpesti Dózsa (7)
- 1970/71: Ferencvárosi TC (8)
- 1971/72: Ferencvárosi TC (9)
- 1972/73: Ferencvárosi TC (10)
- 1973/74: Ferencvárosi TC (11)
- 1974/75: Ferencvárosi TC (12)
- 1975/76: Ferencvárosi TC (13)
- 1976/77: Ferencvárosi TC (14)
- 1977/78: Ferencvárosi TC (15)
- 1978/79: Ferencvárosi TC (16)
- 1979/80: Ferencvárosi TC (17)
- 1980/81: Székesfehérvári Volán SC
- 1981/82: Újpesti Dózsa (8)
- 1982/83: Újpesti Dózsa (9)
- 1983/84: Ferencvárosi TC (18)
- 1984/85: Újpesti Dózsa (10)
- 1985/86: Újpesti Dózsa (11)
- 1986/87: Újpesti Dózsa (12)
- 1987/88: Újpesti Dózsa (13)
- 1988/89: Ferencvárosi TC (19)
- 1989/90: Jászberényi Lehel HC
- 1990/91: Ferencvárosi TC (20)
- 1991/92: Ferencvárosi TC (21)
- 1992/93: Ferencvárosi TC (22)
- 1993/94: Ferencvárosi TC (23)
- 1994/95: Ferencvárosi TC (24)
- 1995/96: Dunaferr SE
- 1996/97: Ferencvárosi TC (25)
- 1997/98: Dunaferr SE (2)
- 1998/99: Alba Volán-Riceland (2)
- 1999/00: Dunaferr SE (3)
- 2000/01: Alba Volán-FeVita (3)
- 2001/02: Dunaferr SE (4)
- 2002/03: Alba Volán-FeVita (4)
- 2003/04: Alba Volán-FeVita (5)
- 2004/05: Alba Volán-FeVita (6)
- 2005/06: Alba Volán-FeVita (7)
- 2006/07: Alba Volán-FeVita (8)
- 2007/08: Alba Volán SC (9)
- 2008/09: Alba Volán SC (10)
- 2009/10: SAPA Fehérvár AV 19 (11)
- 2010/11: SAPA Fehérvár AV 19 (12)
- 2011/12: SAPA Fehérvár AV 19 (13)
- 2012/13: DAB-Docler (5)
- 2013/14: DAB-Docler (6)
  (MOL Liga title winner HC Nové Zámky)
- 2014/15: Miskolci Jegesmedvék
- 2015/16: DVTK Jegesmedvék (2)
- 2016/17: DVTK Jegesmedvék (3)
- 2017/18: MAC Budapest (1)
- 2018/19: Ferencvárosi TC (26)
- 2019/20: Ferencvárosi TC (27)
- 2020/21: Ferencvárosi TC (28)
- 2021/22: Ferencvárosi TC (29)
- 2022/23: Ferencvárosi TC (30)
- 2023/24: Ferencvárosi TC (31)
- 2024/25: Budapest Akademia HK (2)

=== Titles by club ===
Club	Titles	Years won
Ferencvárosi TC	31	1951, 1955, 1956, 1961, 1962, 1964, 1967, 1971, 1972, 1973, 1974, 1975, 1976, 1977, 1978, 1979, 1980, 1984, 1989, 1991, 1992, 1993, 1994, 1995, 1997, 2019, 2020, 2021, 2022, 2023, 2024
Újpesti TE	13	1958, 1960, 1965, 1966, 1968, 1969, 1970, 1982, 1983, 1985, 1986, 1987, 1988
Alba Volán SC Székesfehérvár	13	1981, 1999, 2001, 2003, 2004, 2005, 2006, 2007, 2008, 2009, 2010, 2011, 2012
Budapesti Korcsolyázó Egylet	7	1937, 1938, 1939, 1940, 1942, 1944, 1946
Dunaújvárosi Acélbikák	6	1996, 1998, 2000, 2002, 2013, 2014
Budapesti Vörös Meteor	4	1952, 1957, 1959, 1963
Magyar Testgyakorlók Köre	3	1947, 1948, 1949
DVTK Jegesmedvék	3	2015, 2016, 2017
Budapesti Budai TE	2	1941, 1943
Budapesti Postás	2	1953, 1954
MAC Budapest/Budapest Akademia HK	2	2018, 2025
Meteor Mallerd	1	1950
Jászberényi Lehel HC	1	1990
