= DVTK Jegesmedvék =

- City: Miskolc, Hungary
- League: Erste Liga (2008–2018, 2021–present): OB I bajnokság (1978–2008); Slovak Extraliga (2018–2021)
- Founded: 1978; 48 years ago
- Home arena: Miskolc Ice Hall (capacity: 1,304)
- Colours: Red, white
- General manager: Balázs Láda
- Head coach: Balázs Láda
- Website: www.dvtk.eu
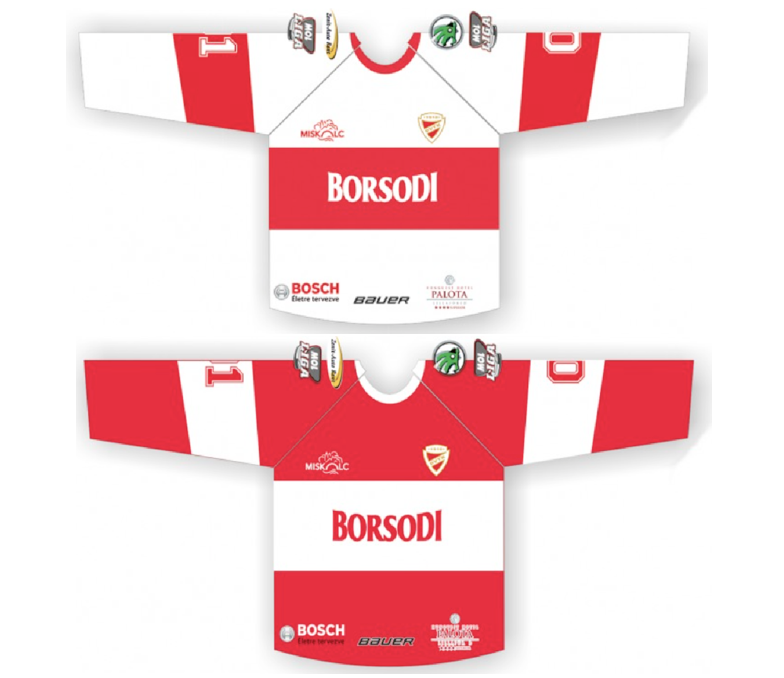

Franchise history
- 1978–1990: Miskolci Kinizsi
- 1990–1994: Miskolci HC
- 1994–2015: Miskolci Jegesmedvék JSE
- 2015–: DVTK Jegesmedvék

DVTK Jegesmedvék (English: DVTK Polar Bears) is a Hungarian ice hockey team that played in the OB I bajnokság and in the Erste Liga. The previously played in the Slovak Extraliga from 2018 until 2021. They play their home games at Miskolc Ice Hall, located in Miskolc.

== Team name ==
Over time the team's name has been the following:

- 1978–90 – Miskolci Kinizsi
- 1990–94 – Miskolci HC
- 1994–2015 – Miskolci Jegesmedvék JSE
- 2015–present – DVTK Jegesmedvék

== Honours ==
=== Domestic ===
Erste Liga

- (gold) Winners (3): 2014–15, 2015–16, 2016–17
- (silver) Runners-up (2): 2011–12, 2017–18
- (bronze) 3rd place (2): 2010–11, 2012–13

=== Pre-season ===
Tatra Cup

- (gold) Winners (1): 2019

== Current roster ==
Source: eliteprospects.comAs of 3 May 2026.

| No. | Nat | Player | Pos | S/G | Age | Acquired | Birthplace |
|---|---|---|---|---|---|---|---|
| 97 | (Hungary) | Ágoston Chlepko | F | L | 18 | 2025 | Budapest, Hungary |
| 73 | (Hungary) | Hunor Alpár Csiki | F | L | 21 | 2023 | Budapest, Hungary |
| 8 | (Hungary) | Márkó Csollák (A) | D | L | 23 | 2025 | Budapest, Hungary |
| 4 | (Hungary) | Vilmos Czina | D | L | 19 | 2025 | Budapest, Hungary |
| 93 | (Serbia) | Mirko Djumic | RW | R | 27 | 2025 | Budapest, Hungary |
| 63 | (Canada) | Colin Doyle | C | R | 27 | 2024 | Campbellford, Ontario, Canada |
| 88 | (Hungary) | Márton Farkas | F | L | 25 | 2019 | Miskolc, Hungary |
| 23 | (Finland) | Lauri Kärmeniemi (A) | D | R | 35 | 2025 | Hämeenlinna, Finland |
| 77 | (Hungary) | Noah Kinloch-Varga | F | L | 22 | 2025 | Toronto, Ontario, Canada |
| 86 | (Hungary) | Dávid Lövei | F | L | 24 | 2019 | Miskolc, Hungary |
| 98 | (Hungary) | Miklos Makai | F | L | 20 | 2025 | Tatabánya, Hungary |
| 27 | (Sweden) | Henrik Marklund | LW | L | 31 | 2025 | Skellefteå, Sweden |
| 71 | (Hungary) | Márk Miskolczi (C) | LW | L | 32 | 2012 | Miskolc, Hungary |
| 12 | (Hungary) | Milan Mura | D | L | 19 | 2025 | Budapest, Hungary |
| 9 | (Hungary) | Dominik Orosz | D | L | 21 | 2024 | Budapest, Hungary |
| 21 | (Canada) | Jason Pineo | C | R | 28 | 2024 | Toronto, Ontario, Canada |
| 36 | (Hungary) | David Pratak | G | L | 23 | 2024 | Miskolc, Hungary |
| 51 | (Hungary) | Kristóf Rétfalvi | C | L | 25 | 2024 | Zalaegerszeg, Hungary |
| 22 | (Canada) | Brodi Stuart | C | L | 26 | 2025 | Langley, British Columbia, Canada |
| 55 | (Hungary) | Zeno Balazs Szaboki | D | L | 21 | 2025 | Budapest, Hungary |
| 18 | (Hungary) | Boldizsár Szalay | F | L | 22 | 2023 | Miskolc, Hungary |
| 28 | (Hungary) | Šimon Szathmáry | D | R | 30 | 2023 | Havlíčkův Brod, Czech Republic |
| 6 | (Hungary) | Bence Szirányi | D | L | 38 | 2018 | Budapest, Hungary |
| 66 | (Hungary) | Gergö Toth | LW | L | 32 | 2025 | Székesfehérvár, Hungary |
| 39 | (Hungary) | Károly Tóth | G | L | 27 | 2025 | Budapest, Hungary |
| 24 | (Hungary) | David Trajcsik | F | L | 19 | 2025 | Budapest, Hungary |
| 53 | (Hungary) | Roland Vokla | D | L | 30 | 2024 | Hódmezővásárhely, Hungary |
| 11 | (Hungary) | Henrik Vörös | F | L | 20 | 2025 | Szeged, Hungary |
| 97 | (Latvia) | Eriks Zohovs | C | R | 28 | 2025 | Riga, Latvia |
