= Újpesti TE (ice hockey) =

Ice hockey club in Budapest, Hungary

- City: Budapest, Hungary
- League: OB I bajnokság 1955–present Erste Liga; 2008–present
- Founded: 1930
- Home arena: Megyeri úti jégcsarnok (capacity: 2,200)
- Colours: Purple, white
- Head coach: Jason Morgan
- Captain: Dániel Kiss
- Website: www.utehoki.hu

Franchise history
- Újpesti TE; 1930–1931; Bp. Dózsa SE; 1955–1956; Újpesti TE; 1956; Újpesti Dózsa SC; 1956–1991; Újpesti Torna Egylet jégkorong szakosztály 1991–present

Újpesti Torna Egylet jégkorong szakosztály (English: Újpesti Torna Egylet ice hockey department) is an ice hockey club from Újpest, Budapest, Hungary. Újpesti TE is one of the sport clubs in Hungary that are part of the Újpesti TE sport society. The club was founded in 1885, while the ice hockey department was founded in 1930 and refounded in 1955. The club has won thirteen national championship titles.

UTE is infamous as being the club of Attila Ambrus, the "Whiskey Robber".

== Former names ==
- Bp. Dózsa SE (1955–1956)
- Újpesti TE (1956–1957)
- Újpesti Dózsa SC (1957–1991)
- Újpesti TE (since 1991)

== Honours ==
- Hungarian League:
  - Winners (13) : 1958, 1960, 1965, 1966, 1968, 1969, 1970, 1982, 1983, 1985, 1986, 1987, 1988
- Hungarian Cup (Ice Hockey):
  - Winners (9) : 1965, 1966, 1970, 1971, 1972, 1985, 1986, 1988, 1990

== Team ==
=== 2022–23 roster ===
Roster for 2022-23 Erste Liga season

Goaltenders
Number		Player	Catches	Born	Place of birth
39	(Hungary)	Miklós Rajna	L	22.06.1991	Dunaújváros, Hungary
55	(Hungary)	Máté Sági	L	03.11.2000	Dunaújváros, Hungary
88	(Hungary)	Tamás Monostori	L	16.02.2002	Budapest, Hungary

Defencemen
Number		Player	Shoots	Born	Place of birth
3	(Finland)	Ville Järvinen	L	03.01.1997	Tampere, Finland
11	(Hungary)	Gábor Tornyai	L	06.10.1998
12	(Canada)	Phil Kiss	L	02.02.1993	Burlington, Ontario, Canada
17	(Hungary)	Dániel Kiss	L	02.08.1991	Dunaújváros, Hungary
44	(Slovakia)	Dusan Kmec	R	15.05.1998	Kosice, Slovakia
76	(Hungary)	Márton Balázsi	L	07.05.2003	Budapest, Hungary
97	(Hungary)	Dávid Pokornyi	L	14.01.2000	Budapest, Hungary

Forwards
Number		Player	Shoots	Born	Place of birth
5	(Hungary)	Benjamin Nemes (A)	L	18.03.1993	Budapest, Hungary
6	(Hungary)	Attila Németh	L	12.10.1992	Budapest, Hungary
8	(Hungary)	Alex Kovács	L	28.10.2000	Székesfehérvár, Hungary
13	(Hungary)	András Benk (C)	L	03.09.1987	Budapest, Hungary
15	(Canada)	Collin Shirley	L	16.03.1996	Saskatoon, Saskatchewan, Canada
18	(Hungary)	Benedek Madácsi	R	08.06.1999	Székesfehérvár, Hungary
21	(Finland)	Toni Henttonen	L	19.09.1994	Savonlinna, Finland
22	(Hungary)	Sebestyén Kovács	L	22.06.2000	Budapest, Hungary
68	(Canada)	James Orban	L	07.01.1998	Calgary, Alberta, Canada
72	(Hungary)	Bence Balogh	L	14.02.1996	Székesfehérvár, Hungary
73	(Canada)	Kyle Just (A)	L	17.01.1991	Arnprior, Ontario Canada
77	(Hungary)	Botond Lászlóffy	L	01.08.2003
81	(Hungary)	Patrik Kiss	L	17.04.1998	Zalaszentiván, Hungary

== Notable alumni ==
- Attila Ambrus - the "Whiskey Robber"
- János Ancsin
- László Ancsin
- Béla Balog
- András Benk
- György Buzás
- Vitaly Davydov (head coach)
- József Farkas
- József Füzesi
- Branislav Fabry
- István Hircsák
- Jindřich Kokrment
- Jan Kruliš
- Balázs Ladányi
- Aleksandr Maltsev
- Sergei Mylnikov
- Zoltán Scheiber
- Sergei Svetlov
- Ferenc Szamosi (player & head coach)
- Valeri Vasiliev
- Józef Voskár
- Ján Zlocha
