= Ferencvárosi TC (ice hockey) =

Ice hockey club in Budapest

Ferencvárosi TC Jégkorong
- City: Budapest, Hungary
- League: ICE Hockey League; 2025–present OB I bajnokság 1929–present Erste Liga; 2017–2025; Panonian League; 2002–2004
- Founded: 1928; 98 years ago
- Home arena: Tüskecsarnok (capacity: 2540)
- Colours: Green, white
- Head coach: Szabolcs Fodor
- Captain: Gergő Nagy
- Website: www.fradi.hu/jegkorong

Franchise history
- Ferencvárosi TC Jégkorong

Ferencvárosi Torna Club Jégkorong Szakosztály is a Hungarian professional ice hockey team that currently plays in the OB I bajnokság and in the ICE Hockey League. They play their home games at Tüskecsarnok, located in Budapest. In 1950–1951 the club was named ÉDOSZ Budapest and from 1951 to 1957 it was named Budapesti Kinizsi.

The team is part of the Ferencvárosi Torna Club sports organization.

== Achievements ==
- OB I bajnokság:
  - (Hungary) (31) : 1951, 1955, 1956, 1961, 1962, 1964, 1967, 1971, 1972, 1973, 1974, 1975, 1976, 1977, 1978, 1979, 1980, 1984, 1989, 1991, 1992, 1993, 1994, 1995, 1997, 2019, 2020, 2021, 2022, 2023, 2024
- Hungarian Cup (Ice Hockey):
  - Winners (16) : 1968, 1969, 1973, 1974, 1975, 1976, 1977, 1979, 1980, 1983, 1990, 1991, 1992, 1995, 2020, 2025
- Hungarian Super Cup (Ice Hockey):
  - Winners (3) : 1994, 2021, 2023
- Panonian League:
  - (Hungary) (1) : 2003
- Erste Liga:
  - Winners (2) : 2019, 2020

== See also ==
- Ferencvárosi TC (football team)
