= Dunaújvárosi Acélbikák =

- City: Dunaújváros, Hungary
- League: OB I bajnokság 1977–present MOL Liga/Erste Liga; 2008–present Austrian National League; 2011–2012
- Founded: 1977
- Home arena: Dunaújvárosi Jégcsarnok (capacity: 4,000 (400 seated))
- Colours: Red, white, black
- Head coach: Ádám Hetler
- Asst. coach: Péter Németh
- Captain: Patrik Szécsi
- Website: acelbikak.net

Franchise history
- Dunaújvárosi Acélbikák

The Dunaújvárosi Acélbikák (English: Dunaújváros Steel Bulls) is a Hungarian ice hockey team that currently plays in the Erste Liga. They play their home games at Dunaújvárosi Jégcsarnok, located in Dunaújváros.

== Team Name ==
Over time the team's name has changed...

- 1977–2002: Dunaferr
- 2003–2005: DAC-Invitel
- 2006–2015: DAB-Docler
- 2015–present: Dunaújvárosi Acélbikák

== Hungarian National Champions ==
The Dunaújváros Steel Bulls have previously won the OB I bajnokság title four times:

- 1995-96
- 1997-98
- 1999-00
- 2001-02
- 2012-13

== MOL Liga Champions ==
The Dunaújváros Steel Bulls have previously won the MOL Liga Champion title two times:

- 2011-12
- 2012-13

== 2010-2011 season ==
- MOL Liga: Finalists (3-1 series loss to HSC Csíkszereda)
- Hungarian Cup: Champions (5-1 win over Vasas HC)
- OB I. Championship League: Finalists (4-0 series loss to Sapa Fehérvár AV19).

== 2011-2012 season ==
- MOL Liga: Champions (4-0 series win to Miskolci JJSE)
- Hungarian Cup: Champions (5-0 win over Miskolci JJSE)
- OB I. Championship League: Quarter Finalists (4-0 series loss to Sapa Fehérvár AV19).
- Austrian National League: Quarter Finalists (series loss to VEU Feldkirch).

== 2012-2013 season ==
- MOL Liga: Champions (4-2 series win against HSC Csíkszereda)
- Hungarian Cup: Bronze Medal

== Current roster ==
Current roster (as of May 3, 2026):

Goaltenders
Number		Player	Catches	Born	Place of birth
31	(Hungary)	János Bejo	L	27.09.2005	Budapest, Hungary
55	(Hungary)	Botond Szücs	L	01.04.2004	Győr, Hungary

Defensemen
Number		Player	Shoots	Born	Place of birth
73	(Hungary)	Márton Balázsi	L	07.05.2003	Budapest, Hungary
65	(Hungary)	Dávid Bánki	L	03.06.2004	Szolnok, Hungary
27	(Belarus)	Yegor Kudin	L	26.05.1995	Minsk, Belarus
61	(Russia)	Alexander Mikulovich – A	L	01.07.1996	Chelyabinsk, Russia
16	(Canada)	Nikola Murgic	L	18.11.2004	Windsor, Ontario, Canada
71	(Hungary)	Kamill Pinczés	L	25.09.2006	Dunaújváros, Hungary
77	(Hungary)	Márk Pozsár	L	03.12.1998	Budapest, Hungary
37	(Hungary)	Patrik Szécsi – C	L	21.01.2000	Budapest, Hungary
79	(Finland)	Vertti Vuoksiala – A	L	01.10.1997	Hamina, Finland

Forwards
Number		Player	Shoots	Born	Place of birth
95	(Hungary)	Istvan Cseh	L	17.05.2003	Budapest, Hungary
19	(Hungary)	Dávid Csémi	L	06.10.2004	Dunajská Streda, Slovakia
82	(Hungary)	Róbert Károly	L	11.05.2003	Budapest, Hungary
71	(Hungary)	Zsombor Keresztes	L	28.11.2005	Budapest, Hungary
72	(Hungary)	Zsombor Kuminka	L	06.09.2006	Dunaújváros, Hungary
13	(United States)	Donte Lawson	L	03.11.2000	Taconite, Minnesota, United States
80	(Hungary)	József Pásztor	L	24.01.2005	Miskolc, Hungary
11	(Hungary)	Oliver Pinczes	L	23.05.2000	Budapest, Hungary
8	(Serbia)	Mateja Popovic	L	20.05.2002
13	(Hungary)	Oliver Strenk	R	14.04.2002	Dunaújváros, Hungary
28	(Serbia)	Srdjan Subotic	R	13.05.2000	Subotica, Serbia
43	(Hungary)	Bendeguz Vadocz	L	30.09.2003
88	(Russia)	Tigran Yarulin	L	09.05.2003	Vladivostok, Russia
28	(Russia)	Bogdan Zorin	L	18.12.2001
