= 1995–96 Romanian Hockey League season =

Romanian ice hockey season

The 1995–96 Romanian Hockey League season was the 66th season of the Romanian Hockey League. Six teams participated in the league, and Steaua Bucuresti won the championship.

== Regular season ==
	Club	GP	W	T	L	GF	GA	Pts
1.	CSA Steaua Bucuresti	20	18	1	1	168	43	37
2.	Sportul Studențesc Bucharest	20	13	1	6	85	82	27
3.	SC Miercurea Ciuc	20	12	1	7	109	66	25
4.	CSM Dunărea Galați	20	10	1	9	69	75	21
5.	CS Progym Gheorgheni	20	2	1	17	55	125	5
6.	Imasa Sfântu Gheorghe	20	2	1	17	38	133	5

== Playoffs ==
=== Final ===
- CSA Steaua Bucuresti - Sportul Studențesc București 16–2,10-1

=== 3rd place ===
- SC Miercurea Ciuc - CSM Dunărea Galați 11–2,13-2

=== 5th place ===
- CS Progym Gheorgheni - HC Sfântu-Gheorghe 5–2,6-1
