= 1998–99 Romanian Hockey League season =

Romanian hockey league season

The 1998–99 Romanian Hockey League season was the 69th season of the Romanian Hockey League, the top league of ice hockey in Romania.

Six teams participated in the league, and Steaua București won the championship.

== Regular season ==
	Club	GP	W	T	L	GF	GA	Pts
1.	CSA Steaua București	20	18	1	1	144	55	37
2.	SC Miercurea Ciuc	20	16	0	4	179	46	32
3.	Sportul Studențesc Bucharest	20	8	3	9	77	88	19
4.	Progym Gheorgheni	20	8	2	10	90	115	18
5.	Imasa Sfântu Gheorghe	20	3	1	16	57	139	7
6.	CSM Dunărea Galați	20	3	1	16	53	157	7

== Playoffs ==
=== 3rd place ===
- Progym Gheorgheni - Sportul Studențesc Bucharest (5-4, 4-6, 4-3, 4-3)

=== Final ===
- CSA Steaua Bucuresti - SC Miercurea Ciuc (2-1, 2-4, 4-5, 5-3, 5-2)
