= 2000–01 Romanian Hockey League season =

Romanian ice hockey season

The 2000–01 Romanian Hockey League season was the 71st season of the Romanian Hockey League. Seven teams participated in the league, and Steaua Bucuresti won the championship.

== Regular season ==
	Club	GP	W	T	L	GF	GA	Pts
1.	SC Miercurea Ciuc	24	22	0	2	275	51	44
2.	CSA Steaua Bucuresti	24	21	0	3	186	52	42
3.	Progym Gheorgheni	24	15	0	9	161	72	30
4.	Sportul Studențesc Bucharest	24	9	1	14	90	147	19
5.	CSM Dunărea Galați	24	8	2	14	86	124	18
6.	Rapid Bucharest	24	6	2	16	94	247	14
7.	Imasa Sfântu Gheorghe	24	0	1	23	43	242	1

== Playoffs ==
=== Semifinals ===
- SC Miercurea Ciuc - Sportul Studențesc Bucharest (9-2, 13-0)
- CSA Steaua Bucuresti - Progym Gheorgheni (2-4, 7-1, 3-2)

=== 3rd place ===
- Progym Gheorgheni - Sportul Studențesc Bucharest (12-2, 3-2, 2-3, 15-0)

=== Final ===
- CSA Steaua Bucuresti - SC Miercurea Ciuc (5-2, 6-4, 4-3)
