= 2005–06 Romanian Hockey League season =

Romanian ice hockey season

The 2005–06 Romanian Hockey League season was the 76th season of the Romanian Hockey League. Six teams participated in the league, and Steaua Bucuresti won the championship.

== First round ==
	Club	GP	W	T	L	GF	GA	Pts
1.	SC Miercurea Ciuc	20	18	1	1	212	32	37
2.	CSA Steaua Bucuresti	20	17	1	2	201	50	35
3.	Progym Gheorgheni	20	10	0	10	102	96	20
4.	CSM Dunărea Galați	20	9	1	10	79	111	19
5.	Sportul Studențesc Bucharest	20	2	1	17	37	204	5
6.	HC Miercurea Ciuc	20	2	0	18	49	187	4

== Final round ==
	Club	GP	W	T	L	GF	GA	Pts
1.	SC Miercurea Ciuc	24	21	1	2	173	41	43
2.	CSA Steaua Bucuresti	24	18	1	5	152	70	37
3.	Progym Gheorgheni	24	6	0	18	82	137	12
4.	CSM Dunărea Galați	24	2	0	22	53	212	4

== Playoffs ==
=== Final ===
- CSA Steaua Bucuresti - SC Miercurea Ciuc 1-2, 4-0, 4-2, 1-0, 3-1

=== 3rd place ===
- Progym Gheorgheni - CSM Dunărea Galați 14-0, 8-2, 9-4

=== 5th place ===
- HC Miercurea Ciuc - Sportul Studențesc București 2-0, 6-3
