= 1996–97 Romanian Hockey League season =

Romanian ice hockey season

The 1996–97 Romanian Hockey League season was the 67th season of the Romanian Hockey League. Six teams participated in the league, and SC Miercurea Ciuc won the championship.

== Regular season ==
	Club	GP	W	T	L	GF	GA	Pts
1.	SC Miercurea Ciuc	20	18	1	1	117	43	37
2.	CSA Steaua Bucuresti	20	17	1	2	150	35	35
3.	Sportul Studențesc Bucharest	20	12	0	8	89	70	24
4.	CSM Dunărea Galați	20	8	0	12	37	89	16
5.	Progym Gheorgheni	20	2	1	17	41	117	5
6.	Imasa Sfântu Gheorghe	20	1	1	18	39	119	3
