= 2007–08 Romanian Hockey League season =

Romanian ice hockey season

The 2007–08 Romanian Hockey League season was the 78th season of the Romanian Hockey League. Eight teams participated in the league, and SC Miercurea Ciuc won the championship.

== First round ==
	Club	GP	W	OTW	OTL	L	GF	GA	Pts
1.	CSA Steaua Bucuresti	28	24	1	1	2	300	61	75
2.	HC Miercurea Ciuc	28	23	2	2	1	192	52	75
3.	SC Miercurea Ciuc	28	21	1	1	5	233	67	66
4.	Progym Gheorgheni	28	15	0	0	13	195	81	45
5.	SCM Brașov	28	12	0	1	10	132	163	37
6.	CSM Dunărea Galați	28	6	3	0	19	72	234	24
7.	Sportul Studențesc Bucharest	28	2	1	1	24	60	280	9
8.	SC Miercurea Ciuc II	28	1	0	2	25	62	308	5

== Final round ==
	Club	GP	W	OTW	OTL	L	GF	GA	Pts
1.	SC Miercurea Ciuc	24	14	2	3	5	92	57	49
2.	HC Miercurea Ciuc	24	12	4	3	5	84	68	47
3.	CSA Steaua Bucuresti	24	14	1	1	8	105	76	45
4.	Progym Gheorgheni	24	0	1	1	22	40	120	3

== Playoffs ==
=== Final ===
- SC Miercurea Ciuc - HC Miercurea Ciuc 5-3, 4-2, 4-3 OT, 3-2

=== 3rd place ===
- CSA Steaua Bucuresti - Progym Gheorgheni 3-1, 7-1, 5-1
