= 1999–2000 Romanian Hockey League season =

Romanian ice hockey season

The 1999–00 Romanian Hockey League season was the 70th season of the Romanian Hockey League. Seven teams participated in the league, and SC Miercurea Ciuc won the championship.

== Regular season ==
	Club	GP	W	T	L	GF	GA	Pts
1.	SC Miercurea Ciuc	24	20	1	3	189	50	41
2.	CSA Steaua Bucuresti	24	17	2	5	128	65	36
3.	Rapid Bucharest	24	16	2	6	130	78	34
4.	Progym Gheorgheni	24	14	2	8	133	77	30
5.	CSM Dunărea Galați	24	7	1	16	65	126	15
6.	Sportul Studențesc Bucharest	24	6	0	18	87	147	12
7.	Imasa Sfântu Gheorghe	24	0	0	24	46	235	0

== Playoffs ==
=== 3rd place ===
- Rapid Bucharest - Progym Gheorgheni (11–8, 2–6, 4–2, 7–4)

=== Final ===
- SC Miercurea Ciuc - CSA Steaua Bucuresti (5–4, 8–0, 7–3)
