= 2001–02 Romanian Hockey League season =

Romanian ice hockey season

The 2001–02 Romanian Hockey League season was the 72nd season of the Romanian Hockey League. Seven teams participated in the league, and Steaua Bucuresti won the championship.

== Regular season ==
	Club	GP	W	T	L	GF	GA	Pts
1.	CSA Steaua Bucuresti	24	22	1	1	287	45	45
2.	SC Miercurea Ciuc	24	21	1	2	223	40	43
3.	Progym Gheorgheni	24	16	0	8	181	69	32
4.	Sportul Studențesc Bucharest	24	10	1	13	88	171	21
5.	Dinamo Bucharest	24	6	3	15	74	162	15
6.	CSM Dunărea Galați	24	2	3	19	56	228	7
7.	Imasa Sfântu Gheorghe	24	2	1	21	51	245	5

== Playoffs ==
=== Semifinals ===
- CSA Steaua Bucuresti - Sportul Studențesc Bucharest (7-2, 15-1, 11-0)
- Progym Gheorgheni - SC Miercurea Ciuc (3-7, 6-4, 8-1, 2-0)

=== 3rd place ===
- SC Miercurea Ciuc - Sportul Studențesc Bucharest (6-2, 4-2, 10-2)

=== Final ===
- CSA Steaua Bucuresti - Progym Gheorgheni (8-2, 5-4, 4-0)
