= 2004–05 Romanian Hockey League season =

Romanian ice hockey season

The 2004–05 Romanian Hockey League season was the 75th season of the Romanian Hockey League. Six teams participated in the league, and Steaua Bucuresti won the championship.

== Regular season ==
	Club	GP	W	T	L	GF	GA	Pts
1.	CSA Steaua Bucuresti	24	19	0	1	188	37	38
2.	SC Miercurea Ciuc	24	16	1	3	156	51	33
3.	Progym Gheorgheni	24	9	2	9	72	70	20
4.	CSM Dunărea Galați/Dinamo Bucharest	24	8	0	12	82	126	16
5.	HC Miercurea Ciuc	24	5	1	14	56	119	11
6.	Sportul Studențesc Bucharest	24	1	0	19	54	205	2

== Playoffs ==
=== Semifinals ===
- CSA Steaua Bucuresti - Dinamo Bucharest (17-4, 14-3, 11-3)
- SC Miercurea Ciuc - Progym Gheorgheni (3-1, 9-2, 5-0)

=== 5th place ===
- HC Miercurea Ciuc - Sportul Studențesc Bucharest (6-3, 2-3, 7-2)

=== 3rd place ===
- Progym Gheorgheni - Dinamo Bucharest (2-3, 1-2, 4-2, 6-3, 9-5)

=== Final ===
- CSA Steaua Bucuresti - SC Miercurea Ciuc (4-5, 4-2, 5-2, 0-4, 1-3, 5-4, 4-3)
