= 1997–98 Romanian Hockey League season =

Season in Romanian Hockey

The 1997–98 Romanian Hockey League season was the 68th season of the Romanian Hockey League. Six teams participated in the league, and Steaua Bucuresti won the championship.

== Regular season ==
	Club	GP	W	T	L	GF	GA	Pts
1.	CSA Steaua Bucuresti	20	17	1	2	163	43	35
2.	SC Miercurea Ciuc	20	17	1	2	193	52	35
3.	Sportul Studențesc Bucharest	20	11	0	9	87	78	22
4.	CSM Dunărea Galați	20	6	0	14	55	142	12
5.	Progym Gheorgheni	20	4	1	15	56	156	9
6.	Imasa Sfântu Gheorghe	20	3	1	16	48	131	7

== Playoffs ==
=== 3rd place ===
- Sportul Studențesc Bucharest - CSM Dunărea Galați (3-1, 7–2, 8–4)

=== Final ===
- CSA Steaua Bucuresti - SC Miercurea Ciuc (3-2, 1–3, 0–3, 7–5, 1–0)
