= 2006–07 Romanian Hockey League season =

Romanian ice hockey season

The 2006–07 Romanian Hockey League season was the 77th season of the Romanian Hockey League. Six teams participated in the league, and SC Miercurea Ciuc won the championship.

== First round ==
	Club	GP	W	T	L	GF	GA	Pts
1.	SC Miercurea Ciuc	20	18	0	2	215	51	36
2.	CSA Steaua Bucuresti	20	16	0	4	220	45	32
3.	HC Miercurea Ciuc	20	12	0	8	152	68	24
4.	Progym Gheorgheni	20	10	0	10	115	82	20
5.	CSM Dunărea Galați	20	3	0	17	25	278	6
6.	Sportul Studențesc Bucharest	20	1	0	19	25	228	2

== Final round ==
	Club	GP	W	T	L	GF	GA	Pts
1.	SC Miercurea Ciuc	24	17	2	4	139	87	36
2.	CSA Steaua Bucuresti	24	15	3	6	118	64	33
3.	Progym Gheorgheni	24	7	0	17	78	134	14
4.	HC Miercurea Ciuc	24	5	3	16	75	125	13

== Playoffs ==
=== Final ===
- SC Miercurea Ciuc - CSA Steaua Bucuresti 4-2, 5-6, 3-1, 3-2, 5-4

=== 3rd place ===
- HC Miercurea Ciuc - Progym Gheorgheni 4-7, 8-3, 5-2, 9-4

=== 5th place ===
- Sportul Studențesc Bucharest - CSM Dunărea Galați 3-2, 5-2
