= 1993–94 Romanian Hockey League season =

Romanian ice hockey season

The 1993–94 Romanian Hockey League season was the 64th season of the Romanian Hockey League. Five teams participated in the league, and Steaua Bucuresti won the championship.

== Regular season ==
	Club	GP	W	T	L	GF	GA	Pts
1.	CSA Steaua Bucuresti	24	22	2	0	197	58	46
2.	SC Miercurea Ciuc	24	16	2	6	128	64	34
3.	Sportul Studențesc Bucharest	24	11	2	11	77	85	24
4.	CSM Dunărea Galați	24	6	1	17	66	148	13
5.	Imasa Sfântu Gheorghe	24	1	1	22	47	160	3
