= 1990–91 Romanian Hockey League season =

Romanian ice hockey season

The 1990–91 Romanian Hockey League season was the 61st season of the Romanian Hockey League. Six teams participated in the league, and Steaua Bucuresti won the championship.

== Regular season ==
Team	GP	W	T	L	GF	GA	Pts
Steaua Bucuresti	30	29	1	0	269	66	59
SC Miercurea Ciuc	30	22	3	5	160	96	47
Dunarea Galati	30	15	3	12	110	102	33
Viitorul Gheorgheni	30	10	2	18	112	170	22
Sportul Studentesc Bucharest	30	8	2	20	106	168	18
Imasa Sfantu Gheorghe	30	0	1	29	77	232	1
