= 1991–92 Romanian Hockey League season =

Romanian ice hockey season

The 1991–92 Romanian Hockey League season was the 62nd season of the Romanian Hockey League. Five teams participated in the league, and Steaua Bucuresti won the championship.

== Regular season ==
Team	GP	W	T	L	GF	GA	Pts
Steaua Bucuresti	20	20	0	0	191	54	40
SC Miercurea Ciuc	20	9	4	7	82	78	22
Dunarea Galati	20	8	5	7	76	76	21
CS Sportul Studenţesc Bucharest	20	7	2	11	64	98	16
Imasa Sfantu Gheorghe	20	0	1	19	44	151	1
