= 1989–90 Romanian Hockey League season =

Romanian ice hockey season

The 1989–90 Romanian Hockey League season was the 60th season of the Romanian Hockey League. Six teams participated in the league, and Steaua Bucuresti won the championship. The final round was cancelled after 17 games due to the Romanian Revolution.

== First round ==
Team	GP	W	T	L	GF	GA	Pts
Steaua Bucuresti	20	18	0	2	111	50	36
SC Miercurea Ciuc	20	14	2	4	104	50	30
Dinamo Bucuresti	20	11	2	7	85	65	24
Dunarea Galati	20	6	2	12	67	86	14
Viitroul Gheorgheni	20	6	0	14	68	104	12
Progresul Miercurea Ciuc	20	1	2	17	59	139	4

== Final round ==
Team	GP	W	T	L	GF	GA	Pts
Steaua Bucuresti	17	14	1	2	84	42	29
SC Miercurea Ciuc	17	9	3	5	69	51	21
Dinamo Bucuresti	17	4	4	9	49	71	12
Dunarea Galati	17	2	2	13	51	89	6

== Promotion/Relegation ==
Team	GP	W	T	L	GF	GA	Pts
Viitorul Gheorgheni	12	7	2	3	61	49	16
Sportul Studentesc Bucharest	12	7	1	4	58	37	15
Imasa Sfantu Gheorghe	12	4	2	6	32	48	10
Progresul Miercurea Ciuc	12	1	3	8	35	62	5
