= 1992–93 Romanian Hockey League season =

Romanian ice hockey season

The 1992–93 Romanian Hockey League season was the 63rd season of the Romanian Hockey League. Five teams participated in the league, and Steaua București won the championship.

== Regular season ==
| | Club | GP | W | T | L | GF | GA | Pts |
|---|---|---|---|---|---|---|---|---|
| 1. | CSA Steaua Bucuresti | 20 | 20 | 0 | 0 | 147 | 45 | 40 |
| 2. | SC Miercurea Ciuc | 20 | 11 | 2 | 7 | 89 | 58 | 24 |
| 3. | CSM Dunărea Galați | 20 | 8 | 2 | 10 | 53 | 67 | 18 |
| 4. | Sportul Studențesc Bucharest | 20 | 8 | 2 | 10 | 58 | 93 | 18 |
| 5. | Imasa Sfântu Gheorghe | 20 | 0 | 0 | 20 | 21 | 105 | 0 |
