= 2009–10 Romanian Hockey League season =

Romanian ice hockey season

The 2009–10 Romanian Hockey League season was the 80th season of the Romanian Hockey League. Six teams participated in the league, and SC Miercurea Ciuc won the championship.

== First round ==
	Club	GP	W	OTW	OTL	L	GF	GA	Pts
1.	SC Miercurea Ciuc	20	18	0	1	1	236	34	55
2.	CSA Steaua Bucuresti	20	17	1	0	2	156	40	53
3.	SCM Brașov	20	12	0	0	8	119	68	36
4.	Progym Gheorgheni	20	7	1	0	12	63	102	23
5.	Sportul Studențesc Bucharest	20	2	0	1	17	44	217	7
6.	CSM Dunărea Galați	20	1	1	1	17	53	210	6

== Final round ==
	Club	GP	W	OTW	OTL	L	GF	GA	Pts
1.	SC Miercurea Ciuc	6	4	0	1	1	25	15	44
2.	CSA Steaua Bucuresti	6	4	1	0	1	22	14	43
3.	SCM Brașov	6	3	0	0	3	24	19	21
4.	Progym Gheorgheni	6	0	0	0	6	8	31	0

== Playoffs ==
=== Semifinals ===
- SC Miercurea Ciuc - Progym Gheorgheni 12-1, 12-2 8-0
- CSA Steaua Bucuresti - SCM Braşov 4-3 OT, 6-2, 5-2

=== Final ===
- SC Miercurea Ciuc - CSA Steaua Bucuresti 3-2, 5-2, 4-2, 0-1, 2-3, 6-3

=== 3rd place ===
- SCM Braşov - Progym Gheorgheni 6-1, 4-3, 5-4 OT, 3-0

=== 5th place ===
- CSM Dunărea Galați - Sportul Studențesc București 8-3, 5-2, 5-6, 5-4
