= 1994–95 Romanian Hockey League season =

Romanian ice hockey season

The 1994–95 Romanian Hockey League season was the 65th season of the Romanian Hockey League. Five teams participated in the league, and Steaua Bucuresti won the championship.

== Regular season ==
	Club	GP	W	T	L	GF	GA	Pts
1.	CSA Steaua Bucuresti	20	17	2	1	146	54	36
2.	SC Miercurea Ciuc	20	13	2	5	114	64	28
3.	Sportul Studențesc Bucharest	20	8	3	9	68	109	19
4.	CSM Dunărea Galați	20	7	2	11	67	81	16
5.	Imasa Sfântu Gheorghe	20	0	1	19	31	118	1
