= 1985–86 Romanian Hockey League season =

Romanian ice hockey season

The 1985–86 Romanian Hockey League season was the 56th season of the Romanian Hockey League. Eight teams participated in the league, and Steaua Bucuresti won the championship.

== First round ==
Team	GP	W	T	L	GF	GA	Pts
Steaua Bucuresti	7	6	1	0	58	14	13
SC Miercurea Ciuc	7	6	1	0	35	12	13
Dinamo Bucuresti	7	5	0	2	72	31	10
Progresul Miercurea Ciuc	7	4	0	3	55	27	8
Viitorul Gheorgheni	7	3	0	4	36	48	6
Dunarea Galati	7	2	0	5	36	45	4
Imasa Sfantu Gheorghe	7	1	0	6	26	54	2
Metalul Radauti	7	0	0	7	24	111	0

== Final round ==
Team	GP	W	T	L	GF	GA	Pts
Steaua Bucuresti	24	18	3	3	126	67	39
SC Miercurea Ciuc	24	13	3	8	90	68	29
Dinamo Bucuresti	24	7	4	13	85	98	18
Progresul Miercurea Ciuc	24	3	4	17	74	142	10
