= 2011–12 Romanian Hockey League season =

Romanian ice hockey season

The 2011–12 Romanian Hockey League season was the 82nd season of the Romanian Hockey League. HSC Csíkszereda won the championship by defeating ASC Corona Fenestela Braşov in the league final. The Steaua Rangers finished third by defeating CSM Dunărea Galați in the third place game.

A Moldovan club, Platina Chisinau, initially participated in the first round. They defeated HSC Csíkszereda 9-4 in their first game. They had to forfeit their second game, also against HSC Csíkszereda, due to not having the minimum number of players available to play. A brawl occurred in their third game, a 9-2 win again against HSC Csíkszereda. All players involved were suspended, which forced Platina to forfeit their fourth scheduled game against HSC Csíkszereda, as they did not have enough players available due to the suspensions. After failing to appear for and forfeiting their next two games against CS Progym Gheorgheni, Platina withdrew from the league.

== First round ==
	Club	GP	W	OTW/SOW	OTL/SOL	L	Goals	Pts
1.	HSC Csíkszereda	16	14	0	1	1	134:40	44
2.	CSM Dunărea Galați	16	13	0	1	2	131:52	40
3.	CS Progym Gheorgheni	16	5	1	0	10	58:99	17
4.	Steaua Rangers II	16	2	2	1	11	58:112	11
5.	Sportul Studențesc Bucharest	16	2	0	2	12	44:122	8

== Qualification round ==
	Club	GP	W	OTW/SOW	OTL/SOL	L	Goals	Pts
1.	CSM Dunarea Galati	4	4	0	0	0	45:14	12
2.	CS Progym Gheorgheni	4	2	0	0	2	13:15	6
3.	Sportul Studențesc Bucharest	4	0	0	0	4	13:42	0

== MOL Championship ==
The three Romanian teams also playing in the MOL Liga were ranked according to the results from games in which they faced each other. HSC Csíkszereda qualified directly for the playoffs as a result of finishing first.

	Club	GP	W	OTW/SOW	OTL/SOL	L	Goals	Pts
1.	HSC Csíkszereda	10	7	1	0	2	51:27	23
2.	Steaua Rangers	10	5	0	1	4	31:47	16
3.	ASC Corona Fenestela Brașov	10	1	1	1	7	34:42	6

== Final round ==
	Club	GP	W	OTW/SOW	OTL/SOL	L	Goals	Pts
1.	ASC Corona Fenestela Brașov	12	11	0	0	1	110:20	33
2.	Steaua Rangers	12	8	0	0	4	63:40	24
3.	CSM Dunărea Galați	12	5	0	0	7	54:79	15
4.	CS Progym Gheorgheni	12	0	0	0	12	20:108	0

== Playoffs ==
=== Semifinals ===
- HSC Csíkszereda - CSM Dunărea Galați 3:0 (13:2, 6:3, 14:0)
- ASC Corona Fenestela Brașov - Steaua Rangers 3:2 (8:5, 3:6, 3:1, 3:4 SO, 5:2)

=== 3rd place game ===
- Steaua Rangers - CSM Dunărea Galați 3:1 (10:1, 5:6, 7:2, 10:2)

=== Final ===
- HSC Csíkszereda - ASC Corona Fenestela Brașov 4:1 (3:4 OT, 6:1, 3:1, 3:0, 3:2)
