= 2003–04 Romanian Hockey League season =

Romanian ice hockey season

The 2003–04 Romanian Hockey League season was the 74th season of the Romanian Hockey League. Five teams participated in the league, and SC Miecurea Ciuc won the championship.

== Regular season ==
	Club	GP	W	T	L	GF	GA	Pts
1.	CSA Steaua Bucuresti	24	21	2	1	220	58	44
2.	SC Miercurea Ciuc	24	17	3	4	148	59	37
3.	Dinamo Bucharest	24	10	2	12	90	112	22
4.	Progym Gheorgheni	24	8	1	15	95	124	17
5.	Sportul Studențesc Bucharest	24	0	0	24	37	237	0

== Playoffs ==
=== 3rd place ===
- Progym Gheorgheni - Dinamo Bucharest (5-3, 4-2, 6-4)

=== Final ===
- SC Miercurea Ciuc - CSA Steaua Bucuresti (5-3, 5-2, 6-1)
