= 2010–11 Romanian Hockey League season =

Romanian ice hockey season

The 2010–11 Romanian Hockey League season was the 81st season of the Romanian Hockey League. Six teams participated in the league, and HSC Csikszereda won the championship.

== First round ==
	Club	GP	W	OTW	OTL	L	GF	GA	Pts
1.	HSC Csíkszereda	10	9	0	0	1	100	17	27
2.	SCM Brașov	10	7	0	1	2	65	22	22
3.	Steaua Rangers	10	5	2	0	3	54	34	19
4.	CSM Dunărea Galați	10	5	0	1	4	61	56	16
5.	Progym Gheorgheni	10	2	0	0	8	19	72	6
6.	Sportul Studențesc București	10	0	0	0	10	19	117	0

== Qualification round ==
	Club	GP	W	OTW	OTL	L	GF	GA	Pts
4.	CSM Dunărea Galați	8	8	0	0	0	77	27	24
5.	Progym Gheorgheni	8	4	0	0	4	34	33	12
6.	Sportul Studențesc București	8	0	0	0	8	21	72	0

== Final round ==
	Club	GP	W	OTW	OTL	L	GF	GA	Pts
1.	HSC Csíkszereda	11	10	0	0	1	83	22	30
2.	Steaua Rangers	11	5	2	0	4	47	38	19
3.	SCM Brașov	12	4	1	2	5	50	43	16
4.	CSM Dunărea Galați	12	1	0	1	10	24	101	4

== Playoffs ==
=== Semifinals ===
- HSC Csikszereda - CSM Dunărea Galați 10-2, 13-2, 12-4
- SCM Braşov - Steaua Rangers 8-2, 3-4 OT, 4-0, 5-2

=== Final ===
- HSC Csikszereda - SCM Braşov 2-3, 3-4, 7-0, 2-1 OT, 6-1, 6-0

=== 3rd place ===
- Steaua Rangers - CSM Dunărea Galați 7-3, 9-1, 7-3

=== 5th place ===
- Progym Gheorgheni - Sportul Studențesc București 8-1, 8-1, 3-5, 9-0
