= 1983–84 Romanian Hockey League season =

Romanian ice hockey season

The 1983–84 Romanian Hockey League season was the 54th season of the Romanian Hockey League. Six teams participated in the league, and Steaua Bucuresti won the championship.

== Regular season ==
Team	GP	W	T	L	GF	GA	Pts
Steaua Bucuresti	30	27	2	1	256	74	56
SC Miercurea Ciuc	30	24	2	4	185	71	50
Dinamo Bucuresti	30	17	1	12	175	131	35
Progresul Miercurea Ciuc	30	6	5	19	99	199	17
Avantul Gheorgheni	30	4	3	23	102	242	11
Dunarea Galati	30	4	3	23	91	194	11

== Promotion/Relegation ==
- Dunarea Galati - Imasa Sfantu Gheorghe 4–0, 6-3
