= 1978–79 Romanian Hockey League season =

Romanian ice hockey season

The 1978–79 Romanian Hockey League season was the 49th season of the Romanian Hockey League. Six teams participated in the league, and Dinamo Bucuresti won the championship.

== Regular season ==
Team	GP	W	T	L	GF	GA	Pts
Dinamo Bucuresti	40	37	1	2	392	115	75
Steaua Bucuresti	40	32	1	7	335	125	65
SC Miercurea Ciuc	40	23	1	16	233	189	47
Dunarea Galati	40	13	2	26	170	244	28
Unirea Sfantu Gheorghe	40	11	1	28	150	298	23
Sportul Studentesc Bucharest	40	0	2	38	124	433	2
