= 2012–13 Romanian Hockey League season =

Romanian ice hockey season

The 2012–13 Romanian Hockey League season was the 83rd season of the Romanian Hockey League, the top level of ice hockey in Romania. Seven teams participated in the league, and HSC Csíkszereda won the championship.

== First round ==
	Club	GP	W	OTW	OTL	L	GF	GA	Pts
1.	HSC Csíkszereda	12	10	0	1	1	87	31	31
2.	SCM Fenestela 68 Brașov	12	9	0	0	3	103	29	27
3.	Steaua Rangers	12	7	1	0	4	65	38	23
4.	HSC Csíkszereda II	12	5	1	0	6	43	60	17
5.	CS Progym Gheorgheni	12	4	1	0	7	50	55	14
6.	CSM Dunărea Galați	12	4	0	1	7	50	79	13
7.	Sportul Studențesc	12	0	0	1	11	25	131	1

== Qualification round ==
	Club	GP	W	OTW	OTL	L	GF	GA	Pts
3.	Steaua Rangers	16	10	0	1	5	91	52	54
4.	HSC Csíkszereda II	16	11	0	0	5	80	52	50
5.	CSM Dunărea Galați	16	9	1	1	5	95	59	43
6.	CS Progym Gheorgheni	16	7	1	0	8	75	51	37
7.	Sportul Studențesc	16	1	0	0	15	31	158	4

== Playoffs ==
=== Semifinals ===
- HSC Csíkszereda - HSC Csíkszereda II 1:0 (12:0)
- SCM Fenestela 68 Brașov - Steaua Rangers 3:0 (3:2 OT, 7:0, 3:2)

=== 3rd place game ===
- Steaua Rangers - HSC Csíkszereda II 3:0 (6:1, 6:2, 7:1)

=== Final ===
- HSC Csíkszereda - SCM Fenestela 68 Brașov 4:1 (6:2, 2:4, 6:2, 4:1, 6:4)
