= 2002–03 Romanian Hockey League season =

Romanian ice hockey season

The 2002–03 Romanian Hockey League season was the 73rd season of the Romanian Hockey League. Four teams participated in the league, and Steaua Bucuresti won the championship.

== Regular season ==
	Club	GP	W	T	L	GF	GA	Pts
1.	CSA Steaua Bucuresti	36	28	0	8	211	114	56
2.	SC Miercurea Ciuc	36	25	2	9	171	90	52
3.	Dinamo Bucharest	36	9	4	23	100	174	22
4.	Progym Gheorgheni	36	4	6	26	96	200	14

== Final ==
- CSA Steaua Bucuresti - SC Miercurea Ciuc (5-0, 4-1, 3:2 SO)
