= 1987–88 Romanian Hockey League season =

Romanian ice hockey season

The 1987–88 Romanian Hockey League season was the 58th season of the Romanian Hockey League. Four teams participated in the league, and Steaua Bucuresti won the championship.

== Regular season ==
Team	GP	W	T	L	GF	GA	Pts
Steaua Bucuresti	18	14	1	3	96	49	29
Dinamo Bucuresti	18	10	3	5	89	66	23
SC Miercurea Ciuc	18	8	2	8	69	62	18
Dunarea Galati	18	0	2	16	53	130	2
