= 2008–09 Romanian Hockey League season =

Romanian ice hockey season

The 2008–09 Romanian Hockey League season was the 79th season of the Romanian Hockey League. Five teams participated in the league, and SC Miercurea Ciuc won the championship.

== First round ==
	Club	GP	W	OTW	OTL	L	GF	GA	Pts
1.	HC Miercurea Ciuc	16	12	1	2	1	86	44	40
2.	SC Miercurea Ciuc	16	10	2	1	3	77	43	35
3.	CSA Steaua Bucuresti	16	7	0	1	8	67	59	22
4.	SCM Brașov	16	3	2	0	11	44	81	13
5.	Progym Gheorgheni	16	3	0	1	12	46	93	10

== Final round ==
	Club	GP	W	OTW	OTL	L	GF	GA	Pts
1.	HC Miercurea Ciuc	18	14	1	2	1	93	44	46
2.	SC Miercurea Ciuc	18	9	3	1	5	75	56	34
3.	CSA Steaua Bucuresti	18	6	0	2	10	73	79	20
4.	SCM Brașov	18	2	1	0	15	44	106	8

== Playoffs ==
=== Final ===
- SC Miercurea Ciuc - HC Miercurea Ciuc 6-4, 3-1, 3-5, 3-2, 3-2

=== 3rd place ===
- CSA Steaua Bucuresti - SCM Braşov 8-7 OT, 7-2, 1-5, 3-1

== Relegation ==
- Progym Gheorgheni - Sportul Studențesc Bucharest 1-4, 4-2, 4-2, 12-4, 6-4
