= 1974–75 Romanian Hockey League season =

Romanian ice hockey season

The 1974–75 Romanian Hockey League season was the 45th season of the Romanian Hockey League. Eight teams participated in the league, and Steaua Bucuresti won the championship.

== Final round ==
Team	GP	W	T	L	GF	GA	Pts
Steaua Bucuresti	24	19	3	2	152	55	41
Dinamo Bucuresti	24	17	4	3	158	79	38
SC Miercurea Ciuc	24	6	2	16	73	151	14
Dunarea Galati	24	1	1	22	76	174	3

== 5th-8th place ==
Team	GP	W	T	L	GF	GA	Pts
Agronomia Cluj	24	13	4	7	142	89	30
Liceul Miercurea Ciuc	24	12	1	11	101	121	25
ASE Bucuresti	24	8	5	11	97	101	21
Tarnava Odorheiu Secuiesc	24	9	2	13	101	130	20
