= 1979–80 Romanian Hockey League season =

Romanian ice hockey season

The 1979–80 Romanian Hockey League season was the 50th season of the Romanian Hockey League. Six teams participated in the league, and Steaua Bucuresti won the championship.

== Regular season ==
Team	GP	W	T	L	GF	GA	Pts
Steaua Bucuresti	35	31	1	3	428	110	63
Dinamo Bucuresti	35	26	3	6	383	137	55
SC Miercurea Ciuc	35	22	3	10	392	137	47
Unirea Sfantu Gheorghe	35	12	2	21	203	336	26
Dunarea Galati	35	8	1	26	165	297	17
Metalul Radauti	35	1	0	34	110	669	2
