= 1982–83 Romanian Hockey League season =

Romanian ice hockey season

The 1982–83 Romanian Hockey League season was the 53rd season of the Romanian Hockey League. Four teams participated in the league, and Steaua Bucuresti won the championship.

== Regular season ==
Team	GP	W	T	L	GF	GA	Pts
Steaua Bucuresti	24	19	4	1	167	71	42
SC Miercurea Ciuc	24	14	4	6	118	82	32
Dinamo Bucuresti	24	10	2	12	113	123	22
Dunarea Galati	24	0	0	24	71	193	0
