= 1981–82 Romanian Hockey League season =

Romanian ice hockey season

The 1981–82 Romanian Hockey League season was the 52nd season of the Romanian Hockey League. Six teams participated in the league, and Steaua Bucuresti won the championship.

== Regular season ==
Team	GP	W	T	L	GF	GA	Pts
Steaua Bucuresti	35	29	3	3	292	70	61
Dinamo Bucuresti	35	26	3	6	307	154	55
SC Miercurea Ciuc	35	25	2	8	257	111	52
Dunarea Galati	35	9	1	25	127	265	19
Progresul Miercurea Ciuc	35	5	2	28	109	278	12
Avantul Gheorgheni	35	5	1	29	112	326	11
