= 1975–76 Romanian Hockey League season =

Romanian ice hockey season

The 1975–76 Romanian Hockey League season was the 46th season of the Romanian Hockey League. Four teams participated in the league, and Dinamo Bucuresti won the championship.

== Final round ==
Team	GP	W	T	L	GF	GA	Pts
Dinamo Bucuresti	6	6	0	0	44	10	12
Steaua Bucuresti	6	4	0	2	34	24	8
Dunarea Galati	6	2	0	4	21	34	4
SC Miercurea Ciuc	6	0	0	6	13	44	0
