= 1976–77 Romanian Hockey League season =

Romanian ice hockey season

The 1976–77 Romanian Hockey League season was the 47th season of the Romanian Hockey League. Ten teams participated in the league, and Steaua Bucuresti won the championship.

== Final round ==
Team	GP	W	T	L	GF	GA	Pts
Steaua Bucuresti	15	13	0	2	143	41	26
SC Miercurea Ciuc	15	8	1	6	72	80	17
Dinamo Bucuresti	15	7	1	7	84	70	15
Dunarea Galati	15	1	0	14	29	137	2

== 5th-10th place ==
Team	GP	W	T	L	GF	GA	Pts
Unirea Sfantu Gheorghe	25	20	1	4	181	74	41
ASE Bucuresti	25	16	3	6	185	114	35
Agronomia Cluj	25	9	3	13	123	161	21
Avantul Gheorgheni	25	10	1	14	120	133	21
Tarnava Odorheiu Secuiesc	25	9	1	15	127	170	19
Liceul Miercurea Ciuc	25	5	3	17	102	186	13
