= 1971–72 Romanian Hockey League season =

Romanian ice hockey season

The 1971–72 Romanian Hockey League season was the 42nd season of the Romanian Hockey League. Eight teams participated in the league, and Dinamo Bucuresti won the championship.

== Final round ==
Team	GP	W	T	L	GF	GA	Pts
Dinamo Bucuresti	15	12	1	2	98	27	25
Steaua Bucuresti	15	12	1	2	95	27	25
Avantul Miercurea Ciuc	15	4	0	11	43	89	8
Agronomia Cluj	15	1	0	14	32	120	2

== 5th-8th place ==
Team	GP	W	T	L	GF	GA	Pts
IPGG Bucuresti	15	11	0	4	60	38	22
Dunarea Galati	15	8	3	4	64	44	19
Avantul Gheorgheni	15	4	2	9	60	75	10
Tarnava Odorheiu Secuiesc	15	4	1	10	51	78	9
