= 1980–81 Romanian Hockey League season =

Romanian ice hockey season

The 1980–81 Romanian Hockey League season was the 51st season of the Romanian Hockey League. Six teams participated in the league, and Dinamo Bucuresti won the championship.

== Regular season ==
Team	GP	W	T	L	GF	GA	Pts
Dinamo Bucuresti	35	29	2	4	307	125	60
Steaua Bucuresti	35	28	1	6	287	93	57
SC Miercurea Ciuc	35	24	2	9	273	123	50
Avantul Gheorgheni	35	8	2	25	128	296	18
Dunarea Galati	35	6	2	27	120	263	14
Unirea Sfantu Gheorghe	35	4	3	28	99	314	11
