= 1984–85 Romanian Hockey League season =

Romanian ice hockey season

The 1984–85 Romanian Hockey League season was the 55th season of the Romanian Hockey League. Six teams participated in the league, and Steaua Bucuresti won the championship.

== Regular season ==
Team	GP	W	T	L	GF	GA	Pts
Steaua Bucuresti	25	22	2	1	217	60	46
SC Miercurea Ciuc	25	18	3	4	165	64	39
Dinamo Bucuresti	25	15	4	6	168	99	34
Viitorul Gheorgheni	25	7	0	18	89	201	14
Dunarea Galati	25	4	1	20	72	152	9
Progresul Miercurea Ciuc	25	4	0	21	59	194	8
