= 1988–89 Romanian Hockey League season =

Romanian hockey competition

The 1988–89 Romanian Hockey League season was the 59th season of the Romanian Hockey League. Four teams participated in the league, and Steaua Bucuresti won the championship.

== Regular season ==
| Team | GP | W | T | L | GF | GA | Pts |
|---|---|---|---|---|---|---|---|
| Steaua Bucuresti | 24 | 19 | 3 | 2 | 181 | 57 | 41 |
| SC Miercurea Ciuc | 24 | 11 | 5 | 8 | 89 | 78 | 27 |
| Dinamo Bucuresti | 24 | 9 | 4 | 11 | 77 | 101 | 22 |
| Dunarea Galati | 24 | 3 | 0 | 21 | 64 | 175 | 6 |
