= 1986–87 Romanian Hockey League season =

57th season of the Romanian hockey league

The 1986–87 Romanian Hockey League season was the 57th season of the Romanian Hockey League. Four teams participated in the league, and Steaua Bucuresti won the championship.

== Regular season ==
Team	GP	W	T	L	GF	GA	Pts
Steaua Bucuresti	36	29	1	6	184	95	59
SC Miercurea Ciuc	36	19	3	14	141	127	41
Dinamo Bucuresti	36	18	3	15	162	137	39
Dunarea Galati	36	1	3	32	109	237	5
