= 1972–73 Romanian Hockey League season =

Romanian ice hockey season

The 1972–73 Romanian Hockey League season was the 43rd season of the Romanian Hockey League. Four teams participated in the league, and Dinamo Bucuresti won the championship.

== Regular season ==
| | Club |
|---|---|
| 1. | Dinamo Bucuresti |
| 2. | CSA Steaua Bucuresti |
| 3. | CSM Dunărea Galați |
| 4. | Avântul Miercurea Ciuc |
