= 1973–74 Romanian Hockey League season =

Romanian ice hockey season

The 1973–74 Romanian Hockey League season was the 44th season of the Romanian Hockey League. Eight teams participated in the league, and Steaua Bucuresti won the championship.

== First round ==
Team	GP	W	T	L	GF	GA	Pts
Steaua Bucuresti	14	13	1	0	121	13	27
Dinamo Bucuresti	14	12	1	1	159	28	25
SC Miercurea Ciuc	14	9	0	5	65	52	18
Dunarea Galati	14	5	3	6	55	52	13
Agronomia Cluj	14	6	1	7	52	81	13
IPGG Bucuresti	14	3	2	9	41	90	8
Tarnava Odorheiu Secuiesc	14	2	1	11	44	134	5
Liceul Miercurea Ciuc	14	1	1	12	34	121	3

== Final round ==
Team	GP	W	T	L	GF	GA	Pts
Steaua Bucuresti	18	14	2	2	99	32	30
Dinamo Bucuresti	18	14	2	2	123	45	30
SC Miercurea Ciuc	18	4	0	14	56	126	8
Dunarea Galati	18	2	0	16	46	121	4

== 5th-8th place ==
Team	GP	W	T	L	GF	GA	Pts
Agronomia Cluj	18	14	0	4	89	56	28
IPGG Bucuresti	18	9	2	7	64	60	20
Liceul Miercurea Ciuc	18	5	3	10	47	75	13
Tarnava Odorheiu Secuiesc	18	4	3	11	64	93	11
