= 1957–58 Romanian Hockey League season =

Romanian ice hockey season

The 1957–58 Romanian Hockey League season was the 28th season of the Romanian Hockey League. Four teams participated in the league, and CCA Bucuresti won the championship.

== Regular season ==
Team	GP	W	T	L	GF	GA	Pts
CCA Bucuresti	6	5	1	0	33	7	11
Vointa Miercurea Ciuc	6	3	2	1	19	19	8
Progresul Gheorgheni	6	1	2	3	17	26	4
Dinamo Targu Mures	6	0	1	5	18	35	0
