= Cam Severson =

Canadian ice hockey player

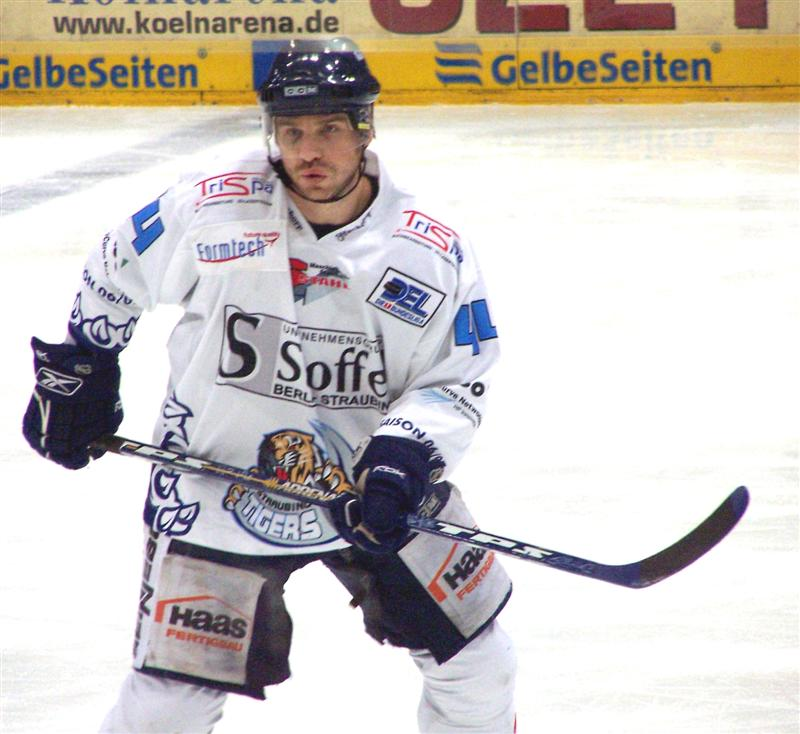
- Born: January 15, 1978 (age 48) Norquay, Saskatchewan, Canada
- Height: 6 ft 2 in (188 cm)
- Weight: 229 lb (104 kg; 16 st 5 lb)
- Position: Left wing
- Shot: Left
- Played for: Mighty Ducks of Anaheim; Columbus Blue Jackets
- NHL draft: 192nd overall, 1997; San Jose Sharks
- Playing career: 1999–2010

Cam Severson (born August 15, 1978) is a Canadian former professional ice hockey centre who played parts of three seasons in the National Hockey League (NHL) for the Mighty Ducks of Anaheim and Columbus Blue Jackets.

== Playing career ==
Severson was drafted in the eighth round, 192nd overall, by the San Jose Sharks in the 1997 NHL entry draft.

After playing five full seasons in the Western Hockey League and part of a sixth, Severson joined the Central Hockey League's Oklahoma City Blazers during the 1998–99 season. He spent the 1999–2000 season in the East Coast Hockey League and part of the 2000–01 season in the United Hockey League before joining the American Hockey League. He has spent the majority of his professional career playing for various AHL teams, with a few stops in the National Hockey League.

Severson played two games for the Mighty Ducks of Anaheim in the 2002–03 season, and thirty-one in the 2003–04 season, during which he scored three goals. He appeared in games with the Columbus Blue Jackets in the 2005–06 season, after his rights were acquired from the Calgary Flames on February 28 in exchange for Cale Hulse.

Severson moved to Germany's Deutsche Eishockey Liga in 2006, joining the Straubing Tigers. He stayed with the Tigers partway through the 2007–08 season and then moved on to play for the Linz Black Wings or the Erste Bank Liga for the remainder of the season.

In 2008, Severson was offered a job as an assistant coach of the Spokane Chiefs, a major junior team in the Western Hockey League, but instead joined Steaua București Hockey, a Romanian Hockey League team, becoming the first Canadian and the first former NHL player to play in Romania. Midway through the season, Severson was named assistant coach of the team, and then head coach. He was a coach/player for Steaua București Hockey of the Romanian Hockey League and Liga MOL in Romania and signed with the Mississippi RiverKings on 18 August 2009 as a player-coach.

== Coaching career ==
In 2010, Severson joined the Spokane Jr. Chiefs Bantam AAA Hockey Team in Spokane, Washington as their head coach. He also puts on various camps throughout the year at the Eagles Ice-a-Rena, including Sever's Summer Hockey School, and enlists the help of current and former WHL and KIJHL players, such as Tyler Johnson and Tanner Mort of the Spokane Chiefs, Tyler Alos of the Seattle Thunderbirds, and others.

In 2012, Severson founded Compete Hockey Schools and Compete Hockey Academy based out of Coeur d'Alene, Idaho. Compete Hockey Schools runs numerous youth hockey development camps throughout Washington, Idaho, and Alaska. Compete Hockey Academy is the first hockey prep school program in the Western United States. Compete Hockey Academy teams play in the Canadian Sports School Hockey League as well as attend various showcase tournaments throughout the United States. Compete Hockey Academy currently has 15-, 16-, 17- and 18-year-old players from Alaska, Arizona, Colorado, Wyoming, Washington, Idaho, Texas, Canada, Russia, and Ukraine.

== Career statistics ==
=== Regular season and playoffs ===
			Regular season					Playoffs
Season	Team	League	GP	G	A	Pts	PIM	GP	G	A	Pts	PIM
1993–94	Kamloops Blazers	WHL	2	0	0	0	0	—	—	—	—	—
1994–95	Kamloops Blazers	WHL	30	4	1	5	40	—	—	—	—	—
1994–95	Swift Current Broncos	WHL	15	2	1	3	16	6	0	0	0	2
1995–96	Swift Current Broncos	WHL	32	6	4	10	40	—	—	—	—	—
1995–96	Lethbridge Hurricanes	WHL	27	2	4	6	45	4	2	0	2	8
1996–97	Lethbridge Hurricanes	WHL	45	12	13	25	169	—	—	—	—	—
1996–97	Prince Albert Raiders	WHL	16	5	13	18	54	4	4	0	4	8
1997–98	Prince Albert Raiders	WHL	41	23	25	48	129	—	—	—	—	—
1997–98	Spokane Chiefs	WHL	23	9	11	20	88	18	11	4	15	51
1998–99	Spokane Chiefs	WHL	46	16	17	33	190	—	—	—	—	—
1998–99	Oklahoma City Blazers	CHL	5	6	3	9	4	10	4	0	4	26
1999–00	Louisiana IceGators	ECHL	7	0	2	2	22	—	—	—	—	—
1999–00	Peoria Rivermen	ECHL	56	19	8	27	138	18	3	4	7	41
2000–01	Quad City Mallards	UHL	46	22	26	48	129	—	—	—	—	—
2000–01	Portland Pirates	AHL	8	0	0	0	11	—	—	—	—	—
2000–01	Cincinnati Mighty Ducks	AHL	20	4	7	11	60	3	1	1	2	0
2001–02	Hartford Wolf Pack	AHL	65	11	10	21	116	5	0	0	0	7
2002–03	Cincinnati Mighty Ducks	AHL	71	12	9	21	156	—	—	—	—	—
2002–03	Mighty Ducks of Anaheim	NHL	2	0	0	0	8	1	0	0	0	0
2003–04	Mighty Ducks of Anaheim	NHL	31	3	0	3	50	—	—	—	—	—
2003–04	Cincinnati Mighty Ducks	AHL	38	7	7	14	145	9	1	5	6	29
2004–05	Milwaukee Admirals	AHL	63	6	8	14	255	4	0	0	0	12
2005–06	Omaha Ak-Sar-Ben Knights	AHL	54	13	7	20	146	—	—	—	—	—
2005–06	Columbus Blue Jackets	NHL	4	0	0	0	5	—	—	—	—	—
2005–06	Syracuse Crunch	AHL	12	4	3	7	28	3	0	0	0	21
2006–07	Straubing Tigers	DEL	45	14	8	22	76	—	—	—	—	—
2007–08	Straubing Tigers	DEL	13	1	0	1	47	—	—	—	—	—
2007–08	EHC Linz	EBEL	21	6	4	10	36	11	3	1	4	22
2008–09	Steaua București	ROM	29	24	17	41	70	—	—	—	—	—
2009–10	Mississippi RiverKings	CHL	18	8	5	13	34	—	—	—	—	—
AHL totals			331	57	51	108	917	15	1	1	2	40
NHL totals			37	3	0	3	63	1	0	0	0	0
