= 1962–63 Romanian Hockey League season =

Romanian ice hockey season

The 1962–63 Romanian Hockey League season was the 33rd season of the Romanian Hockey League. Six teams participated in the league, and Vointa Miercurea Ciuc won the championship.

== Regular season ==
	Club
1.	Voința Miercurea Ciuc
2.	CSA Steaua Bucuresti
3.	Știința Bucharest
4.	Steagul Roșu Brașov
5.	Știința Cluj
6.	Avântul Miercurea Ciuc
