= 1966–67 Romanian Hockey League season =

Romanian ice hockey season

The 1966–67 Romanian Hockey League season was the 37th season of the Romanian Hockey League. Six teams participated in the league, and Steaua Bucuresti won the championship.

== Regular season ==
	Club	GP	W	T	L	Pts
1.	CSA Steaua Bucuresti	20				36
2.	Dinamo Bucuresti	20				32
3.	Avântul Miercurea Ciuc	20				26
4.	Agronomia Cluj	20				16
5.	Târnava Odorheiu Secuiesc	20				8
6.	Politechnica Bucharest	20				2
