= 1951–52 Romanian Hockey League season =

Romanian ice hockey season

The 1951–52 Romanian Hockey League season was the 22nd season of the Romanian Hockey League. Nine teams participated in the league, and Avantul Miercurea Ciuc won the championship.

== Regular season ==
	Club
1.	Avântul Miercurea Ciuc
2.	Spartak Târgu Mureș
3.	CCA Bucuresti
4.	Flacăra Bucharest
5.	Steagul Roșu Brașov
6.	Știința Cluj
7.	Locomotive Galați
8.	Spartak Sighișoara
9.	Dinamo Brașov
