= 1970–71 Romanian Hockey League season =

Romanian ice hockey season

The 1970–71 Romanian Hockey League season was the 41st season of the Romanian Hockey League. Six teams participated in the league, and Dinamo Bucuresti won the championship.

== Regular season ==
Team	GP	W	T	L	GF	GA	Pts
Dinamo Bucuresti	25	22	1	2	229	59	45
Steaua Bucuresti	25	21	2	2	218	36	44
Avantul Miercurea Ciuc	25	11	3	11	120	127	25
Agronomia Cluj	25	8	2	15	103	169	18
IPGG Bucuresti	25	6	4	15	79	130	16
Avantul Gheorgheni	25	0	2	23	59	277	2
