= 1967–68 Romanian Hockey League season =

Romanian ice hockey season

The 1967–68 Romanian Hockey League season was the 38th season of the Romanian Hockey League. Seven teams participated in the league, and Dinamo Bucuresti won the championship.

== Regular season ==
	Club	GP	W	T	L	GF	GA	Pts
1.	Dinamo Bucuresti	24	24	0	0	221	28	48
2.	CSA Steaua Bucuresti	24				280	40	42
3.	Avântul Miercurea Ciuc	24				143	118	28
4.	Agronomia Cluj	24				134	140	26
5.	IPGG Bucharest	24				63	174	12
6.	Avântul Gheorgheni	24				36	228	8
7.	Târnava Odorheiu Secuiesc	24				46	215	6
