= 1956–57 Romanian Hockey League season =

Romanian ice hockey season

The 1956–57 Romanian Hockey League season was the 27th season of the Romanian Hockey League. Four teams participated in the league, and Recolta Miercurea Ciuc won the championship.

== Regular season ==
Team	GP	W	T	L	GF	GA	Pts
Recolta Miercurea Ciuc	5	5	0	0	27	6	10
CCA Bucuresti	5	3	1	1	31	12	7
Stiinta Cluj	5	1	1	3	14	13	3
Progresul Gheorgheni	5	0	0	5	8	47	0
