= 1952–53 Romanian Hockey League season =

Romanian ice hockey season

The 1952–53 Romanian Hockey League season was the 23rd season of the Romanian Hockey League. Six teams participated in the league, and CCA Bucuresti won the championship.

== Regular season ==
Team	GP	W	T	L	GF	GA	Pts
CCA Bucuresti	5	5	0	0	42	6	10
Avantul Miercurea Ciuc	5	3	0	2	43	18	6
Stiinta Cluj	5	3	0	2	32	18	6
Spartak Targu Mures	5	3	0	2	6	30	18
Dinamo Bucuresti	5	1	0	4	5	41	2
Steagul Rosu Brasov	5	0	0	5	7	58	0
