= 1968–69 Romanian Hockey League season =

Romanian ice hockey season

The 1968–69 Romanian Hockey League season was the 39th season of the Romanian Hockey League. Five teams participated in the league, and Steaua Bucuresti won the championship.

== Regular season ==
	Club
1.	CSA Steaua Bucuresti
2.	Dinamo Bucuresti
3.	Avântul Miercurea Ciuc
4.	Agronomia Cluj
5.	IPGG Bucharest
