= 1977–78 Romanian Hockey League season =

Romanian ice hockey season

The 1977–78 Romanian Hockey League season was the 48th season of the Romanian Hockey League. Three teams participated in the league, and Steaua Bucuresti won the championship.

== Regular season ==
Team	GP	W	T	L	GF	GA	Pts
Steaua Bucuresti	20	16	2	2	123	49	34
Dinamo Bucuresti	20	12	2	6	90	60	26
SC Miercurea Ciuc	20	0	0	20	46	150	0
