= 1959–60 Romanian Hockey League season =

Romanian ice hockey season

The 1959–60 Romanian Hockey League season was the 30th season of the Romanian Hockey League. Six teams participated in the league, and Vointa Miercurea Ciuc won the championship.

== Regular season ==
Team	GP	W	T	L	GF	GA	Pts
Vointa Miercurea Ciuc	10	9	0	1	93	10	18
CCA Bucuresti	10	9	0	1	18	99	13
Stiinta Cluj	10	5	0	5	54	37	10
Avantul Miercurea Ciuc	10	4	0	6	39	62	8
CS Targu Mures	10	3	0	7	18	93	6
CS Radauti	10	0	0	10	16	103	0
