= 1954–55 Romanian Hockey League season =

Romanian ice hockey season

The 1954–55 Romanian Hockey League season was the 25th season of the Romanian Hockey League. Six teams participated in the league, and CCA Bucuresti won the championship.

== Regular season ==
	Club	GP	W	T	L	GF	GA	Pts
1.	CCA Bucuresti	10	10	0	0	96	4	20
2.	Avântul Miercurea Ciuc	10	8	0	2	94	18	16
3.	Știința Cluj	10	5	1	4	52	56	11
4.	Steagul Roșu Brașov	10						
5.	Voința Bucharest	10						
6.	Dinamo Târgu Mureș	10						
