= Jan Fadrný =

Czech ice hockey player

- Born: June 14, 1980 (age 45) Brno, Czechoslovakia
- Height: 6 ft 0 in (183 cm)
- Weight: 182 lb (83 kg; 13 st 0 lb)
- Position: Centre
- Shot: Right
- Played for: Wilkes-Barre/Scranton Penguins; HC Slavia Praha; HC České Budějovice; HC Znojemští Orli; HC Vsetín; HK-SKP Žilina; Neuchatel Young-Sprinters; Saale Bulls Halle; Dresden Ice Lions; IHC Písek; MHC Martin; HSC Csíkszereda; SK Boskovice
- NHL draft: 169th overall, 1998; Pittsburgh Penguins
- Playing career: 2001–2016

Jan Fadrný (born June 14, 1980) is a Czech former professional ice hockey center. Fadrný was drafted by the Pittsburgh Penguins in the 6th round (169th overall) in the 1998 NHL Entry Draft.

== Career statistics ==
			Regular season					Playoffs
Season	Team	League	GP	G	A	Pts	PIM	GP	G	A	Pts	PIM
1994–95	SK Kralovo pole U18	Czech U18	36	26	18	44	—	—	—	—	—	—
1995–96	HC Ytong Brno U20	Czech U20	35	15	22	37	26	—	—	—	—	—
1996–97	HC Olomouc U20	Czech U20	38	16	24	40	32	—	—	—	—	—
1996–97	HC Olomouc	Czech	1	0	0	0	2	—	—	—	—	—
1997–98	HC Slavia Praha U20	Czech U20	14	7	4	11	12	—	—	—	—	—
1997–98	HC Slavia Praha	Czech	18	1	2	3	2	3	0	0	0	4
1998–99	Brandon Wheat Kings	WHL	45	4	17	21	36	5	1	2	3	4
1999–00	Brandon Wheat Kings	WHL	55	26	25	51	56	—	—	—	—	—
2000–01	Brandon Wheat Kings	WHL	2	1	1	2	6	—	—	—	—	—
2000–01	Kelowna Rockets	WHL	56	32	45	77	58	6	3	4	7	8
2001–02	Wilkes-Barre/Scranton Penguins	AHL	60	8	14	22	54	—	—	—	—	—
2002–03	HC Slavia Praha	Czech	32	3	2	5	44	15	2	0	2	14
2003–04	HC Slavia Praha	Czech	12	0	2	2	8	—	—	—	—	—
2003–04	HC České Budějovice	Czech	29	4	5	9	42	—	—	—	—	—
2004–05	HC České Budějovice	Czech2	5	0	1	1	2	—	—	—	—	—
2004–05	HC Kometa Brno	Czech2	25	8	15	23	83	3	0	2	2	18
2005–06	HC Znojemští Orli	Czech	1	0	0	0	2	—	—	—	—	—
2005–06	BK Mladá Boleslav	Czech2	40	13	17	30	64	7	1	2	3	10
2006–07	Vsetínská hokejová	Czech	9	2	3	5	10	—	—	—	—	—
2006–07	BK Mladá Boleslav	Czech2	11	1	1	2	8	—	—	—	—	—
2006–07	HC Havířov Panthers	Czech2	29	7	13	20	104	—	—	—	—	—
2007–08	MsHK Zilina	Slovak	21	4	6	10	71	—	—	—	—	—
2007–08	HC Neuchâtel Young Sprinters	NLB	1	0	0	0	2	—	—	—	—	—
2007–08	Hokej Šumperk 2003	Czech2	7	2	1	3	18	—	—	—	—	—
2008–09	Saale Bulls Halle	Germany3	38	21	32	53	109	—	—	—	—	—
2009–10	Saale Bulls Halle	Germany4	25	28	35	63	114	—	—	—	—	—
2010–11	Dresdner Eislöwen	Germany2	9	4	1	5	2	—	—	—	—	—
2010–11	IHC Písek	Czech2	23	4	13	17	38	—	—	—	—	—
2011–12	MHC Martin	Slovak	10	1	9	10	20	—	—	—	—	—
2011–12	ESV Königsbrunn	Germany4	26	13	25	38	86	—	—	—	—	—
2012–13	MHC Martin	Slovak	23	4	7	11	24	—	—	—	—	—
2012–13	VSK Technika Brno	Czech3	10	5	5	10	16	—	—	—	—	—
2012–13	HSC Csíkszereda	MOL Liga	6	0	5	5	4	9	3	3	6	18
2012–13	HSC Csíkszereda	Romania	—	—	—	—	—	7	8	5	13	10
2013–14	VSK Technika Brno	Czech3	32	10	21	31	54	—	—	—	—	—
2014–15	VSK Technika Brno	Czech3	2	0	2	2	2	—	—	—	—	—
2015–16	SKMB Boskovice	Czech4	12	18	11	29	30	1	0	0	0	0
AHL totals			60	8	14	22	54	—	—	—	—	—
Czech totals			102	10	14	24	110	18	2	0	2	18
Slovak totals			54	9	22	31	115	—	—	—	—	—
Czech2 totals			140	35	61	96	317	10	1	4	5	28

== Awards ==
- 2002-03 Czech Extraliga Champion, HC Slavia Praha
