= 1955–56 Romanian Hockey League season =

Romanian ice hockey season

The 1955–56 Romanian Hockey League season was the 26th season of the Romanian Hockey League. Four teams participated in the league, and CCA Bucuresti won the championship.

== Regular season ==
Team	GP	W	T	L	GF	GA	Pts
CCA Bucuresti	6	6	0	0	34	7	12
Avantul Miercurea Ciuc	6	4	0	2	42	8	8
Stiinta Cluj	6	2	0	4	17	28	4
Steagul Rosu Brasov	6	0	0	6	7	57	0
