= 1969–70 Romanian Hockey League season =

Romanian ice hockey season

The 1969–70 Romanian Hockey League season was the 40th season of the Romanian Hockey League. Six teams participated in the league, and Steaua Bucuresti won the championship.

== Regular season ==
Team	GP	W	T	L	GF	GA	Pts
Steaua Bucuresti	20	19	1	0	163	39	39
Dinamo Bucuresti	20	14	1	5	105	59	29
Avantul Miercurea Ciuc	20	11	1	8	102	69	23
Agronomia Cluj	20	5	2	13	102	54	12
IPGG Bucuresti	20	4	3	13	44	92	11
Tarnava Odorheiu Secuiesc	20	2	2	16	29	143	6
