= 1960–61 Romanian Hockey League season =

Romanian ice hockey season

The 1960–61 Romanian Hockey League Season was the 31st season of the Romanian Hockey League. Four teams participated in the league, and CCA Bucuresti won the championship.

== Regular season ==
	Club
1.	CCA Bucuresti
2.	Știința Cluj
3.	Voința Miercurea Ciuc
4.	Știința Bucharest
