= 1950–51 Romanian Hockey League season =

Romanian ice hockey season

The 1950–51 Romanian Hockey League season was the 21st season of the Romanian Hockey League. Eight teams participated in the league, and RATA Targu Mures won the championship.

== Playoffs ==
=== Quarterfinals ===
- RATA Targu Mures - Locomotive Galati 16:0
- Avantul IPEIL Miercurea Ciuc - Locomotive Sighisoara 19:2
- Partizanul Bucuresti - Steagul Rosu Brasov 2:0
- Stiinta Cluj - ETACS Iasi 21:1

=== Semifinals ===
- RATA Targu Mures - Partizanul Bucuresti 6:1 (2-0, 2-1, 2-0) L.Incze 3, G.Incze, I.Incze, Fenke - Teodorescu
- Avantul IPEIL Miercurea Ciuc - Stiinta Cluj 5:2 (2-1, 2-1, 1-0) Fodor 2, Covaci, Szabo, Czaka - Csacsar, Takacs

=== Final ===
- RATA Targu Mures - Avantul IPEIL Miercurea Ciuc 4:2 (1-0, 0-0, 3-2) Incze I 3, Fenke - Covaci, Czaka

=== 3rd place ===
- Partizanul Bucuresti - Stiinta Cluj 5:4

RATA Targu Mures: Biro, Kerekes, Fabian, Mogos, Ritz, Culcear, Toganel, Incze I, Incze II, Incze III, Nagy, Martonfi

Avantul IPEIL Miercurea Ciuc: Sprencz, Sentes, Incze, Spirea, Covaci, Fodor, Vakar, Fenke II, Szabo, Czaka, Haidu

Partizanul Bucuresti: Dron, Anastasiu, Marinescu, Dlugosch, Tiron, Flamaropol, Teodorescu, Wanieck, Cosman, Pana, Nimereala, Ardeleanu
