= 1964–65 Romanian Hockey League season =

Romanian ice hockey season

The 1964–65 Romanian Hockey League season was the 35th season of the Romanian Hockey League. Six teams participated in the league, and Steaua Bucuresti won the championship.

== Regular season ==
	Club
1.	CSA Steaua Bucuresti
2.	Voința Miercurea Ciuc
3.	Știința Bucharest
4.	Știința Cluj
5.	Dinamo Bucuresti
6.	Târnava Odorheiu Secuiesc
