= 1949–50 Romanian Hockey League season =

Romanian ice hockey season

The 1949–50 Romanian Hockey League season was the 20th season of the Romanian Hockey League. Four teams participated in the league, and RATA Targu Mures won the championship.

== Regular season ==
Team	GP	W	T	L	GF	GA	Pts
RATA Targu Mures	3	2	1	0	10	4	5
Avantul IPEIL Miercurea Ciuc	3	2	1	0	12	6	5
Petrolul Bucuresti	3	1	0	2	7	5	2
Steagul Rosu Brasov	3	0	0	3	1	15	0
