= Mihai Flamaropol =

Romanian footballer (1919–1985)

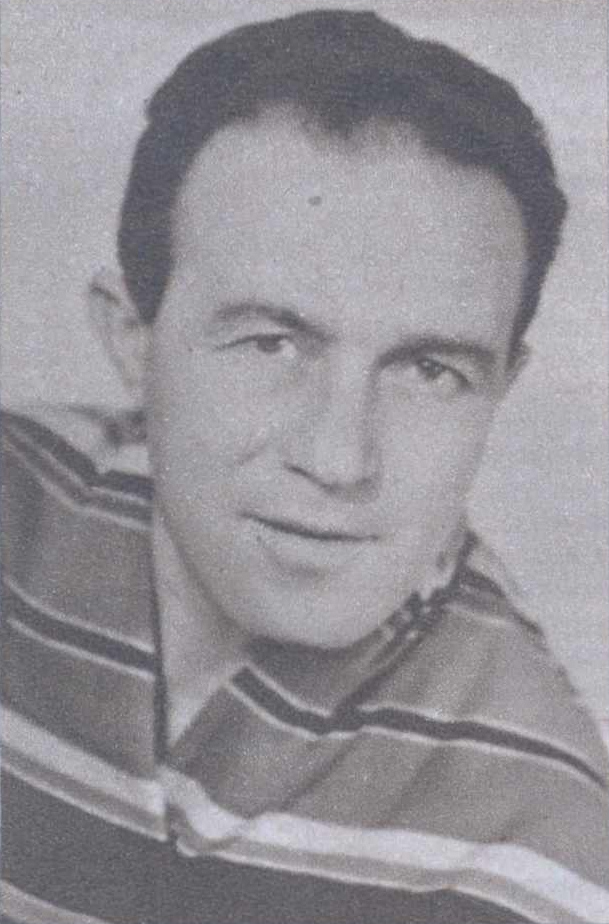
- Flamaropol in 1963

Personal information
- Date of birth: 9 April 1919
- Place of birth: Bucharest, Romania
- Date of death: 30 June 1985 (aged 66)
- Place of death: Bucharest, Romania
- Position: Striker

Youth career
- 1931–1938: Gloria București

Senior career*
Years	Team	Apps	(Gls)
1938–1951	Juventus București (Note: The Divizia A 1940–41 was the last season before World War II and the Divizia A 1946–47 was the first one after, so the appearances and goals scored during this period for Juventus București are not official with the exception of the 1945–46 regional championship.)	131	(66)
1952–1953	CCA București	15	(4)
Total		146	(70)

International career
1948–1951	Romania	4	(0)
* Club domestic league appearances and goals as of 20 January 2020
Ice hockey career
- Position: Center
- Played for: Telefon Club București; Rapid București; Juventus București; CCA București
- Coached for: CCA București; Știința București; Constructorul; Romania; Dinamo București; Romania U18
- National team: Romania
- Playing career: 1936–1959
- Coaching career: 1952–1979

Mihai Flamaropol (9 April 1919 – 30 June 1985) was a Romanian footballer, ice hockey player and coach and a writer.

Flamaropol began playing football at Gloria București when he was 12 years old and at 17 he started to play ice hockey at Telefon Club București. He competed in both sports until he retired from football at age 35, but continued to play ice hockey until he was 40 years old. The Mihai Flamaropol Skating Rink in București is named in his honor.

== Football career ==
Flamaropol was born on 9 April 1919 in Bucharest, Romania and began playing football in 1931 at local club Gloria when he was 12 years old. He made his Divizia A debut on 10 May 1940, playing for Juventus București under coach Coloman Braun-Bogdan in a 5–2 home victory in which he scored a goal against UD Reșița. In his next league game he managed to score again in a 3–1 loss to Unirea Tricolor București. At the end of his first season spent at Juventus, the club was relegated to Divizia B, but Flamaropol stayed with the club, scoring six goals in 14 matches from the 1940–41 Divizia B season, helping the club get promoted back to the first division after one year. However, they did not get to play in Divizia A as the championship was interrupted because of World War II. After the war ended, the first season was the 1945–46 București championship in which he was the team's top-scorer with 16 goals in 14 appearances, helping Juventus earn the fourth place that granted participation in the 1946–47 Divizia A.

In 1952, Flamaropol went to play for CCA București for two seasons. He won the championship in both of them, in the first contributing with three goals in seven appearances and in the second he played eight matches, scoring one goal. He made his last Divizia A appearance on 17 May 1953, playing for CCA București in a 4–0 victory against Locomotiva Timișoara, totaling 48 goals netted in 118 matches in the competition.

He also played four matches for Romania's national team, making his debut under coach Iuliu Baratky on 20 June 1948 in a 1948 Balkan Cup match that ended with a 3–2 home victory against Bulgaria, but he was sent off in the 74th minute. His following game was in the same competition, replacing Andrei Mercea in the 77th minute of a 2–1 home victory against Czechoslovakia.

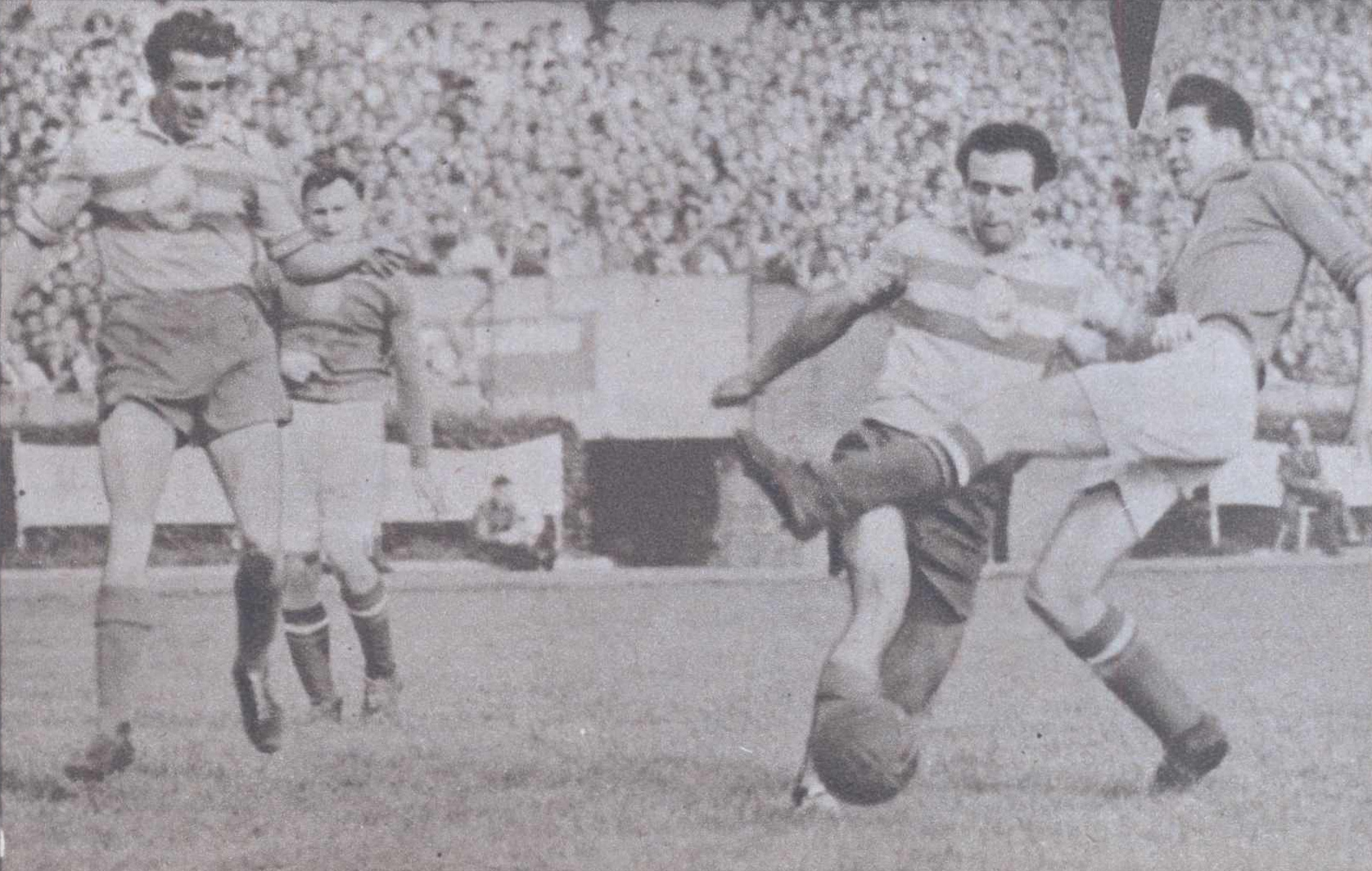
Apolzan (left) and Flamaropol in action against Czechoslovakia at the Great Strahov Stadium in Prague (1951)

Flamaropol's last two appearances for the national team were friendlies, the first one being a 6–0 victory against Albania, and this was the only game in which he played all the minutes for the national team. His last appearance was on 20 May 1951 in which he was replaced at half-time by Gheorghe Băcuț in a 2–2 draw against Czechoslovakia.

== Ice hockey career ==
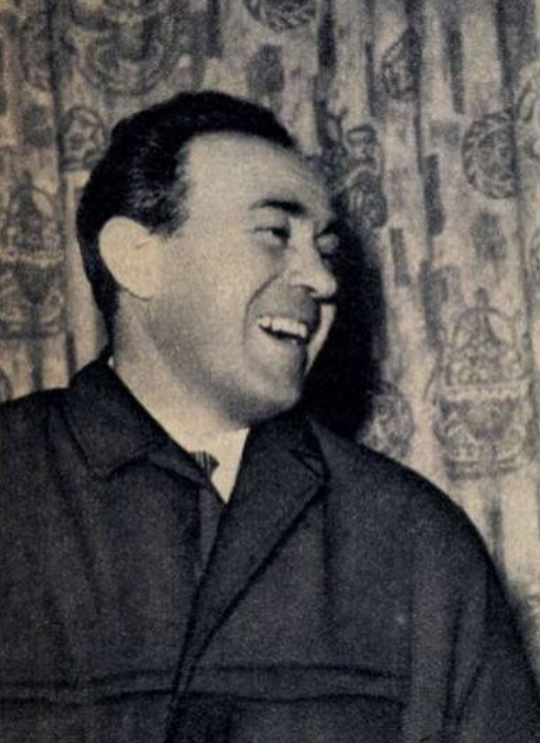
Flamaropol coach of the Romanian national ice hockey team in 1965.

Flamaropol started his ice hockey career in 1936 at Telefon Club București, playing as a center, winning a Romanian Hockey League title in 1937. Because Telefon Club dissolved its hockey team, in 1940 he transferred to newly founded club Rapid București which he captained at age 21 in the winning of the 1940 league. After that season, Rapid's ice hockey section was dissolved so he went to play for Juventus București until 1952, a period in which he won five titles, then he went to CCA București. At CCA he was a player-coach and managed to win five Romanian Hockey Leagues. He was also a national team player, representing it in the 1947 Ice Hockey World Championships where he made two appearances as the team finished in 7th place.

He ended his playing career in 1959, but continued to coach at Știința București, Constructorul and Dinamo București, winning four Romanian Hockey League titles with the latter. He also led Romania's national team in the 1964 and 1968 Winter Olympics, and in the 1973 Ice Hockey World Championships, ending his coaching career in 1979 at Romania's under-18 national team.

== Publications ==
Flamaropol wrote a total of seven volumes, all of which were about football and ice hockey:

- Hochei pe gheață (Ice hockey) (1962)
- 50 de ani de hochei în România (50 years of hockey in Romania) (1976)
- Amintiri din fotbal și hochei (Memories from football and hockey) (1981)
- Fotbal (Football) (1984)
- Fotbal – cadran mondial (Football – world dial) (1984)
- Fotbal – cadran românesc (Football – Romanian dial) (1986)
- Însemnările unui sportiv (The marks of a sportsman)

== Death ==
Flamaropol died on 30 June 1985 at age 66.

== Legacy ==
The Mihai Flamaropol Skating Rink in București is named in his honor.

== Honours ==
=== Footballer ===
Juventus București

- Divizia B: 1940–41

CCA București

- Divizia A: 1952, 1953
- Cupa României: 1952

=== Ice hockey player ===
Telefon Club București

- Romanian Hockey League: 1937

Rapid București

- Romanian Hockey League: 1940

Juventus București

- Romanian Hockey League: 1941, 1942, 1945, 1946, 1947

CCA București

- Romanian Hockey League: 1953, 1955, 1956, 1958, 1959

=== Ice hockey coach ===
CCA București

- Romanian Hockey League: 1953, 1955, 1956, 1958, 1959

Dinamo București

- Romanian Hockey League: 1968, 1971, 1972, 1973

== See also ==
- Leif Skiöld
- Albert Mauer
- Sven Bergqvist
- Vladimír Bouzek
- Einar Bruno Larsen
