= 1948–49 Romanian Hockey League season =

Romanian ice hockey season

The 1948–49 Romanian Hockey League season was the 19th season of the Romanian Hockey League. Three teams participated in the league, and Avintul IPEIL Miercurea Ciuc won the championship.

== Regular season ==
	Club
1.	Avîntul IPEIL Miercurea Ciuc
2.	RATA Târgu Mureș
3.	HC Petrolul Bukarest
