= 1961–62 Romanian Hockey League season =

Romanian ice hockey season

The 1961–62 Romanian Hockey League season was the 32nd season of the Romanian Hockey League. Four teams participated in the league, and CCA Bucuresti won the championship.

== Regular season ==
| | Club |
|---|---|
| 1. | CCA Bucuresti |
| 2. | Voința Miercurea Ciuc |
| 3. | Știința Bucharest |
| 4. | Știința Cluj |
