= 1963–64 Romanian Hockey League season =

Romanian ice hockey season

The 1963–64 Romanian Hockey League season was the 34th season of the Romanian Hockey League. Six teams participated in the league, and Steaua Bucuresti won the championship.

== Regular season ==
	Club
1.	CSA Steaua Bucuresti
2.	Voința Miercurea Ciuc
3.	Știința Bucharest
4.	Știința Cluj
5.	Dinamo Bucuresti
6.	Steagul Roșu Brașov
