= 1958–59 Romanian Hockey League season =

Romanian ice hockey season

The 1958–59 Romanian Hockey League season was the 29th season of the Romanian Hockey League. Six teams participated in the league, and CCA Bucuresti won the championship.

== Regular season ==
	Club
1.	CCA Bucuresti
2.	Voința Miercurea Ciuc
3.	Progresul Gheorgheni
4.	Dinamo Târgu Mureș
5.	Știința Cluj
6.	Recolta Miercurea Ciuc
