= 1965–66 Romanian Hockey League season =

Romanian ice hockey season

The 1965–66 Romanian Hockey League season was the 36th season of the Romanian Hockey League. Six teams participated in the league, and Steaua Bucuresti won the championship.

== Regular season ==
| | Club |
|---|---|
| 1. | CSA Steaua Bucuresti |
| 2. | Voința Miercurea Ciuc |
| 3. | Dinamo Bucuresti |
| 4. | Târnava Odorheiu Secuiesc |
| 5. | Știința Bucharest |
| 6. | Știința Cluj |
