= 1945–46 Romanian Hockey League season =

Romanian ice hockey season

The 1945–46 Romanian Hockey League season was the 17th season of the Romanian Hockey League. Five teams participated in the league, and Juventus București won the championship.

== Regular season ==
Tournament in Cluj (19-24 January 1946, in the park by the lake in front of the restaurant)

CS Târgu Mureș - CS Miercurea Ciuc 2-2

HC Juventus București - CP Cluj 3-1

CS Târgu Mureș - HC Juventus București 2-1

HC Venus București - CP Cluj 3-3

HC Venus București - CS Miercurea Ciuc 5-3

CS Târgu Mureș - CP Cluj 1-1

HC Juventus București - CS Miercurea Ciuc 4-1

CS Târgu Mureș - HC Venus București 4-2

CS Miercurea Ciuc - CP Cluj 4-3

HC Juventus București - HC Venus București 7-4

HC Juventus: Dron, C.Ratiu, Anastasiu, Sadovsky, Pana, Petrovici, Amirovici, Fl. Popescu, Tanase, Cosman, Panenka, Zografi

Team	GP	W	T	L	GF	GA	Pts
HC Juventus București	4	3	0	1	15	8	6
CS Târgu Mureș	4	2	2	0	9	6	6
HC Venus București	4	1	1	2	14	17	3
CS Miercurea Ciuc	4	1	1	2	10	14	3
CP Cluj	4	0	2	2	8	11	2

Top goalscorers

1. Flamaropol 9
2. Incze I 8
3. Dlugosch 6

Romanian Cup

Tournament in București (1-6 February 1946)

1.02, HC Juventus București - PTT 5-0 (1-0, 2–0, 2–0)

PTT: Spiru, Pascu, Florea, Simionescu, Mardarescu, Nimereala, Stanculescu, Wanieck, Gutu

PTT - HC Venus Bucuresti (annulled, melted ice, warm wind)

CS Târgu Mureș - HC Juventus București (annulled, melted ice, warm wind)

HC Juventus wins the Romanian Cup
