= Cupa României (disambiguation) =

The Cupa României is Romania's main football cup competition.

Cupa României may also refer to:

- Cupa României (ice hockey)
- Cupa României (rugby union)
- Cupa României (women's basketball)
- Cupa României (men's handball)

== See also ==
- Supercupa României, a football playoff between Romanian league and cup winners
