= Adam Krug =

American ice hockey coach (born 1983)

Current position
- Title: Assistant Coach
- Team: Vermont
- Conference: Hockey East

Biographical details
- Born: June 6, 1983 (age 43); Livonia, Michigan, USA
- Education: Adrian College

Playing career
- 2004–2006: Wayne State
- 2007–2009: Adrian
- 2008–2009: Cincinnati Cyclones
- 2009–2010: Bossier-Shreveport Mudbugs
- 2010–2011: Nijmegen Devils
- 2011–2012: Mississippi Surge
- 2011–2012: Toledo Walleye
- 2011–2012: Steaua Rangers
- 2012–2013: Evansville IceMen
- Position: Center

Coaching career (HC unless noted)
- 2012–2014: Indiana Ice (asst.)
- 2014–2024: Adrian
- 2024–2026: Bakersfield Condors (asst.)
- 2026–present: Vermont (asst.)

Head coaching record
- Overall: 229–52–14 (.800)
- Tournaments: 9–6 (.600)

Accomplishments and honors

Championships
- NCHA Regular Season Champion (9): 2015, 2016, 2017, 2018, 2020, 2021, 2022, 2023, 2024 NCHA South Division Champion (7): 2016, 2017, 2018, 2019, 2020, 2021, 2022 NCHA Tournament Champion (4): 2015, 2016, 2020, 2022, 2023 NCAA Division III National Champion (1): 2022

Awards
- 2022 Edward Jeremiah Award

Adam Krug is an American ice hockey coach and former player who was the NCAA Division III coach of the year in 2022. He is the elder brother of former NHL defenseman Torey Krug.

== Career ==
Krug's college career began at Wayne State in 2004. After leading the team in scoring as a sophomore, rumors began to circulate about financial troubles with the program. Krug transferred to Adrian College, a small school in southern Michigan, who were set to begin playing varsity ice hockey in 2007. He debuted for the Division III team that year and went on to lead the Bulldogs in scoring, averaging more than 2 points a game. His exploits helped the club win their conference title, however, because the MCHA did not have an automatic bid at the time the Bulldogs weren't invited to play in the NCAA tournament. Krug led his team to a repeat performance in his final season, posing a record of 27–1–1, but were again left out of the tournament.

After graduating, Krug had a short career as a professional. Over a 5-year span he played sparing at most of his stops, however, he did have one good season with the Nijmegen Devils where he led the club in scoring. After playing just one game in 2012–13, Krug retired as a player and began his coaching career.

Krug's first job was as an assistant with the Indiana Ice. In his second season with the team, he helped lead them to a Clark Cup championship, but the financial situation forced the team to suspend operations after the year. Krug was not without a job for long, however, because in the same offseason his former bench boss, Ron Fogarty accepted the head coaching position at Princeton. Adrian turned to one of their own as a replacement and Krug was named as the second head coach for the Bulldogs.

in six seasons under Fogarty, Adrian had never finished with fewer than 20 wins and posted a winging percentage of at least .700. Very little changed when Krug took over as the Bulldogs, who were now in the NCHA, continued to be one of the top teams in Division III. In his first four seasons, Krug won four conference titles, two conference tournament titles and made two appearances in the Frozen Four. After a slight down season in 2019, Adrian returned to the top of their conference in 2020 only to see the team's tournament hopes ended by the COVID-19 pandemic. After slogging through the tumultuous 2021 season, the Bulldogs returned in force for 2022. Adrian posted one of the best records in history, going 31–1, being the unanimous #1 team, and blowing through all three opponents in the tournament en route to the program's first national championship. For the outstanding performance by his team, Krug also received the Edward Jeremiah Award.

After the 2024 season, Krug left Adrian to become an assistant coach for the Bakersfield Condors of the AHL. In 2026, he joined the coaching staff at Vermont.

== Personal life ==
Two of Adam's brothers played college hockey. He played with middle brother Matt at Wayne State while the younger Torey attended Michigan State before embarking on a long career in the NHL.

== Statistics ==
=== Regular season and playoffs ===
			Regular Season					Playoffs
Season	Team	League	GP	G	A	Pts	PIM	GP	G	A	Pts	PIM
2001–02	Springfield Spirit	NAHL	53	4	19	23	33	—	—	—	—	—
2002–03	Springfield Spirit	NAHL	10	3	2	5	27	—	—	—	—	—
2002–03	Capital Centre Pride	NAHL	47	13	21	34	96	—	—	—	—	—
2003–04	Sioux City Musketeers	USHL	59	18	26	44	72	7	0	6	6	8
2004–05	Wayne State	CHA	35	11	8	19	40	—	—	—	—	—
2005–06	Wayne State	CHA	32	7	16	23	56	—	—	—	—	—
2007–08	Adrian	MCHA	29	30	47	77	54	—	—	—	—	—
2008–09	Adrian	MCHA	28	22	30	52	61	—	—	—	—	—
2008–09	Cincinnati Cyclones	ECHL	11	1	2	3	2	—	—	—	—	—
2009–10	Bossier-Shreveport Mudbugs	CHL	4	0	1	1	0	—	—	—	—	—
2010–11	Nijmegen Devils	Netherlands	41	28	43	71	82	7	4	11	15	56
2011–12	Mississippi Surge	SPHL	14	6	9	15	16	—	—	—	—	—
2011–12	Toledo Walleye	ECHL	3	0	0	0	2	—	—	—	—	—
2011–12	Steaua Rangers	MOL Liga	9	7	3	10	22	2	1	1	2	20
2011–12	Steaua Rangers	RHL	8	2	4	6	70	5	1	3	4	8
2012–13	Evansville IceMen	ECHL	1	0	1	1	0	—	—	—	—	—
NAHL totals			110	20	42	62	156	—	—	—	—	—
NCAA totals			124	70	101	171	211	—	—	—	—	—
ECHL totals			15	1	3	4	4	—	—	—	—	—

== Head coaching record ==
Record table
Season	Team	Overall	Conference	Standing	Postseason
Adrian Bulldogs (NCHA) (2003–present)
2014–15	Adrian	24–4–3	16–1–1	1st	NCAA Frozen Four
2015–16	Adrian	24–4–1	17–2–1	T–1st	NCAA Quarterfinals
2016–17	Adrian	20–7–2	17–3–0	1st	NCAA Frozen Four
2017–18	Adrian	24–6–0	17–1–0	1st	NCAA Quarterfinals
2018–19	Adrian	20–8–1	13–4–1	2nd	NCHA Runner-Up
2019–20	Adrian	21–5–3	15–3–2	1st	Tournament Cancelled
2020–21	Adrian	16–6–1	8–0–0	1st	NCHA Semifinals
2021–22	Adrian	31–1–0	18–0–0	1st	NCAA National Champion
2022–23	Adrian	25–5–2	13–4–1	1st	NCAA Runner up
2023–24	Adrian	24–7–1	16–2–0	1st	NCAA Frozen Four
Adrian:		229–52–14 (.800)	150–26–8 (.837)		
Total:		229–52–14			
National champion Postseason invitational champion Conference regular season champion Conference regular season and conference tournament champion Division regular season champion Division regular season and conference tournament champion Conference tournament champion

Awards and achievements
Preceded by Cam Ellsworth	Edward Jeremiah Award; 2021–22	Succeeded by Mark Taylor
