= McNicholas quadruplets =

The McNicholas Quadruplets (Lindsay, Ryan, Brynn, and Connor) were the third set of quadruplets born in the state of Minnesota. The odds of having quadruplets are 1 in 729,000.

They were born October 16, 1986, to Phyllis and Kevin McNicholas of Edina, Minnesota. They have appeared on numerous media outlets throughout the country due to their family's involvement with the Triplet Connection National Convention. They have appeared in National Enquirer, People Magazine, and on The Jenny Jones Show.

Lindsay McNicholas is the wife of Adam Krug, Head Coach of the Adrian College Bulldogs Men's Hockey Team, and her brother in law is Torey Krug who plays for the St. Louis Blues.

== See also ==
- List of multiple births
