= HC Steaua București =

HC Steaua București may refer to:

- CSA Steaua București (Handball) – Handball Club
- CSA Steaua București (Hockey) – Hockey Club
