= Gheorgheni Ice Rink =

Ice rink in Romania

Coordinates: 46.7268°N 25.5924°E

The Gheorgheni Skating Rink (Hungarian: Gyergyószentmiklósi műjégpálya, Romanian: Patinoarul Artificial Gheorgheni) is a covered ice rink in Gheorgheni, Romania. It's the home for ice hockey team Gyergyói HK. The hall has a seating capacity of 1,480 seats.
