= Mihai Flamaropol Ice Rink =

Ice rink in Bucharest, Romania, 1958–2016

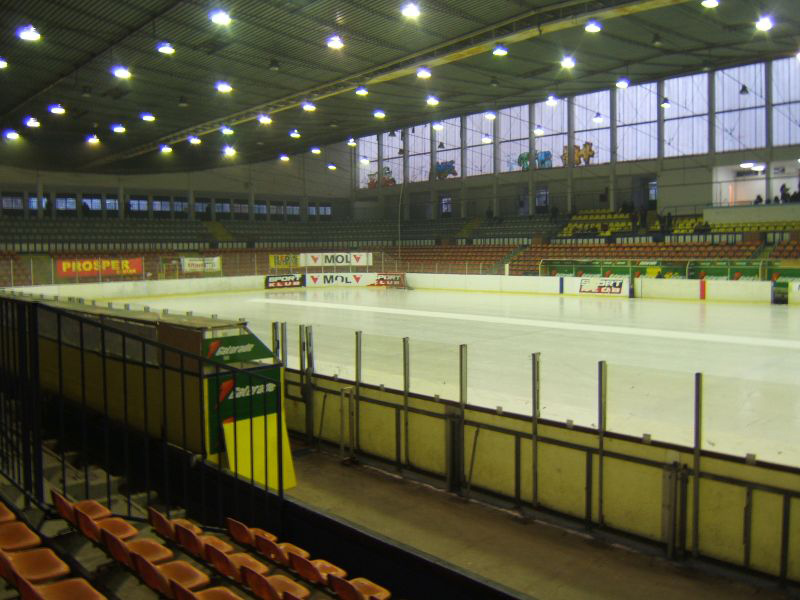
- Former Flamaropol Ice Rink in 2008
- Interactive map of Mihai Flamaropol Ice Rink
- Location: Bucharest, Romania

Construction
- Opened: 1958
- Renovated: 1972
- Demolished: 2016 (derelict)

Tenant
- Steaua Rangers

Mihai Flamaropol Ice Skating Rink (Romanian: Patinoarul Mihai Flamaropol) was an ice arena in Bucharest, Romania. It was primarily used for ice hockey, being the home arena for Steaua Rangers team. It was built in 1958 as an open-air ice rink, and in 1972 was covered for the games of Group B of the 1972 Ice Hockey World Championships. The arena was named after footballer and ice hockey player Mihai Flamaropol.

The ice rink was demolished in March 2016 to make way for a new 3,100-seat arena. Construction for the new arena began in early 2017 and was scheduled to be completed in 2019. The works were stopped in 2019, after the termination of the contract, due to delays and execution problems. By 2019, construction progress was approximately 26%. In August 2023, it was announced that the works will be resumed in 2024 with a new project that includes the remediation of construction problems and an increase capacity to 4,424 seats.

== Events ==
- 1972 Ice Hockey World Championships Group B
- 2012 Edvin Marton, Evgeni Plushenko, Brian Joubert & Stéphane Lambiel in "Kings On Ice"
- 2013 Edvin Marton, Evgeni Plushenko & many others in "Kings On Ice 3"
