= Alexandru Tănase (footballer) =

Romanian footballer

Personal information
- Full name: Alexandru Guță Tănase
- Date of birth: 12 September 1923
- Position: Striker

Senior career*
Years	Team	Apps	(Gls)
1942–1944	Gloria CFR Galați		
1948–1950	Gaz Metan Mediaș		
1952–1953	Minerul Petroșani		

International career
1949	Romania	1	(0)

Managerial career
- 1958–1959: Gaz Metan Mediaș
- 1976–1977: FCM Galați
- * Club domestic league appearances and goals

Alexandru Guță Tănase (born 12 September 1923, date of death unknown) was a Romanian footballer who played as a striker. He was the first footballer of Gaz Metan Mediaș that played for Romania's national team.

== International career ==
Alexandru Tănase played one friendly match for Romania, on 8 May 1949 under coach Colea Vâlcov in a 2–1 victory against Poland.
