= CS Rapid București (hockey) =

Rapid Bucuresti
- City: Bucharest, Romania
- League: Romanian Hockey League
- Founded: 1940
- Folded: 2002

Rapid Bucuresti was an ice hockey team in Bucharest, Romania. They participated in the Romanian Hockey League, the top level of ice hockey in Romania.

The club was founded in 1940 as part of the CS Rapid Bucuresti sports club. The ice hockey section was discontinued in 2002.

== Achievements ==
- Romanian champion (1) : 1940.
