= Cupa României (ice hockey) =

The Cupa Romaniei la Hochei pe gheață is the national ice hockey cup competition in Romania.

== Winners ==
(when available)

Season	Champion	Runner-up	3rd place
1950	SC Miercurea Ciuc		
1952	SC Miercurea Ciuc		
1969	CSA Steaua București		
1973	CSA Steaua București		
1974	CSA Steaua București		
1975	CSA Steaua București		
1976	CSA Steaua București		
1977	CSA Steaua București		
1978	CSA Steaua București		
1980	CSA Steaua București		
1981	CSA Steaua București		
1982	CSA Steaua București		
1984	CSA Steaua București		
1985	CSA Steaua București		
1986	CSA Steaua București		
1987	CSA Steaua București		
1988	CSM Dunărea Galați		
1989	CSA Steaua București		
1990 (Spring)	CSA Steaua București		
1990 (Autumn)	CSA Steaua București		
1991	CSA Steaua București		
1992	CSA Steaua București		
1993	CSA Steaua București		
1994	CSA Steaua București		
1995	CSA Steaua București		
1996	CSA Steaua București		
1997-98	CSA Steaua București		
1998-99	CSA Steaua București		
1999-2000	CSA Steaua București	SC Miercurea Ciuc	Progym-Apicom Gheorgheni
2000-01	CSA Steaua București	SC Miercurea Ciuc	not contested
2001-02	SC Miercurea Ciuc	CSA Steaua București	Progym-Apicom Gheorgheni
2002-03	CSA Steaua București	SC Miercurea Ciuc	not contested
2003-04	SC Miercurea Ciuc	CSA Steaua București	not contested
2004-05	CSA Steaua București	SC Miercurea Ciuc	not contested
2005-06	CSA Steaua București	SC Miercurea Ciuc	not contested
2006-07	SC Miercurea Ciuc	CSA Steaua București	CS Progym Gheorgheni
2007-08	SC Miercurea Ciuc	CSA Steaua București	HC Csíkszereda Miercurea Ciuc
2008-09	CSA Steaua București	ASC Corona Brașov	HC Csíkszereda Miercurea Ciuc
2009-10	SC Miercurea Ciuc	Steaua Rangers	not contested
2010-11	HSC Csíkszereda	ASC Corona Brașov	CSM Dunărea Galați
2011-12	Steaua Rangers	ASC Corona Brașov	not contested
2012-13	Corona Brașov	HSC Csíkszereda	Steaua Rangers
2013-14	HSC Csíkszereda	Corona Brașov	not contested
2014-15	Corona Brașov	HSC Csíkszereda	Steaua Rangers
2015-16	HSC Csíkszereda	Steaua Rangers	CSM Dunărea Galați
2016-17	CSM Dunărea Galați	HSC Csíkszereda	Corona Brașov
2017-18	HSC Csíkszereda	Corona Brașov	CS Progym Gheorgheni
2018-19	HSC Csíkszereda	Corona Brașov	not contested
2019-20	HSC Csíkszereda	ACSH Gheorgheni	Corona Brașov
2020-21	Corona Brașov	HSC Csíkszereda	CSM Galați
2021-22	HSC Csíkszereda	Steaua Rangers	not contested
2023-24	Corona Brașov	ACSH Gheorgheni	Steaua Rangers
2024-25	ACSH Gheorgheni	Corona Brașov	Steaua Rangers
2025-26	Corona Brașov	Steaua Rangers	ACSH Gheorgheni
2026-27	ACSH Gheorgheni	Corona Brașov	ACSHC Fenestela 68

== Titles by team ==
Titles	Team	Year
33	CSA Steaua București	1969, 1973, 1974, 1975, 1976, 1977, 1978, 1980, 1981, 1982, 1984, 1985, 1986, 1987, 1989, 1990-spring, 1990-autumn, 1991, 1992, 1993, 1994, 1995, 1996, 1998-spring, 1998-autumn, 1999, 2000, 2002, 2004, 2005, 2008, 2011-autumn, 2012
15	SC Miercurea Ciuc/HSC Csíkszereda	1950, 1952, 1995, 2001, 2003, 2006, 2007, 2010, 2011, 2014, 2016, 2018, 2019, 2020, 2022
5	Corona Brașov	2013, 2015, 2021, 2024, 2026
2	Dunărea Galați	1988, 2017
2	ACSH Gheorgheni	2025, 2027
