= HC Csíkszereda =

- City: Miercurea Ciuc
- League: Romanian Hockey League; 2002–2009; MOL Liga; 2008–present
- Founded: 2002
- Folded: 2009
- Home arena: Vákár Lajos Ice Hall (capacity: 2,000)
- Colours: Blue, white
- Head coach: arcel Ozmiak; Joakim Nilsson
- Website: http://www.hchoki.ro

Franchise history
- Hockey Club Csíkszereda

Hockey Club Csíkszereda ( HC Miercurea Ciuc in Romanian) was a Romanian ice hockey team from Miercurea Ciuc, (Csíkszereda in Hungarian), Romania.

== Achievements ==
- MOL Liga:
  - Winners (1) : 2009
