= HC Sfântu Gheorghe =

Romanian ice hockey team

HC Sfântu Gheorghe (also known as Imasa Sfântu Gheorghe) was an ice hockey team in Sfântu Gheorghe, Romania. Founded in 1973, they frequently played in the Romanian Hockey League, the top level of ice hockey in Romania. Their last appearance in the Romanian Hockey League came during the 2002-03 season, when they finished in fourth and last place in Group 2 of the league.
