= Gyergyói HK =

Ice hockey team based in Gheorgheni, Romania

- City: Gheorgheni
- League: Romanian Hockey League (1949–present); Erste Liga (2018–present); MOL Liga (2008–2009); Panonian League (2002–2003)
- Founded: 1949
- Home arena: Gyergyószentmiklósi Műjégpálya (capacity: 1,480)
- Colours
- Head coach: Zoltán Szilassy
- Captain: Brance Orbán
- Website: gyergyoihoki.ro

Franchise history
- CS Progym Gheorgheni (until 2018)

Championships
- League champions: 2
- Erste Liga: 2

Gyergyói Hoki Klub is a professional ice hockey team from Gheorgheni, Romania. They play their home games at Gyergyószentmiklósi Műjégpálya.

== History ==
The club was founded in 1949, and have played in the Romanian Hockey League ever since. In 2008, they joined the MOL Liga alongside the Steaua Rangers. However, they only played one season in the MOL Liga, before dropping out. In the 2022-2023 season they became the champions of the Erste League.

== Achievements ==
- Romanian Hockey League:
  - Winners (2): 2024–25, 2025–26
- Romanian Cup:
  - Winners (2): 2024–25, 2026–27
- Erste Liga:
  - Winners (2): 2022–23, 2024-25
