= CSM Dunărea Galați =

Ice hockey team in Galați, Romania

Dunărea Galați
- Nickname: Dunărenii
- City: Galați
- League: Romanian Hockey League
- Founded: 1932
- Home arena: Galați Skating Rink (capacity: 5,000)
- Colors
- General manager: Mihai Brandabur
- Head coach: Vitaly Kirichenko

Franchise history
- CSM Dunărea Galați

CSM Dunărea Galaţi is a professional ice hockey team in Galați, Romania, that plays in the Romanian Hockey League. It was established in 1932 under the name "Gloria C.S.U." Their home rink is the Galați Skating Rink. CSM Dunărea has won the Romanian Hockey league championship two times in a row.

== Achievements ==
- National League:
  - Winners (2): 2014–15, 2015–16
- Romanian Cup:
  - Winners (2): 1988, 2017
