= FCM Dunărea Galați =

Dunărea Galați
- Full name: Fotbal Club Municipal Dunărea Galați
- Founded: 1970 as FC Galați
- Dissolved: 2014
- Ground: Nicolae Rainea
- Capacity: 23,000
Home colours	Away colours

Dunărea Galați was a Romanian professional football club from Galați, Galați County, south-east Romania, founded in 1970. The club was dissolved in 2014.

== History ==
The club was founded in 1970, took the place of Oțelul Galați in Divizia B and has played for 5 seasons in the Liga I.

For a brief period, it was Galați's main team, but after the rise of Oțelul in the 1980s, it is seen only in the Liga II and the Liga III.

They were supposed to be relegated to Liga III at the end of the 2007–08 season, but they managed to maintain their second league position due to the withdrawal of FCM Câmpina.

The 2009–10 season started well, the team reaching the Round of 32 of the Romanian Cup, being eliminated by cup holders CFR Cluj. They finished 11th in the league table.

== Chronology of names ==
Name	Period	Notes
FC Galați	1970–1975	
FCM Galați	1975–1982	Merged with CSU Galați, the former Politehnica Galați.
Dunărea CSU Galați	1982–1988	
Știința NAVROM Galați	1988–1991	
Dunărea Romport Galați	1991–1992	Merged with Gloria CFR Galați (1986), no connection with Gloria CFR Galați.
FCM Dunărea Galați	1992–2014	

== Honours ==
Liga II

- Winners (4): 1973–74, 1975–76, 1978–79, 1982–83
- Runners-up (3): 1977–78, 1984–85, 1991–92

Liga III

- Winners (2): 1989–90, 2003–04
- Runners-up (3): 1987–88, 1988–89, 1990–91

Liga IV – Galați County

- Winners (1): 1992–93

== Former managers ==
- (Romania) Constantin Teașcă (1971–1973)
- (Romania) Ștefan Coidum (1974–1975)
- (Romania) Gheorghe Nuțescu (1975–1976)
- (Romania) Alexandru Tănase (1976–1977)
- (Romania) Gheorghe Constantin (1977–1978)
- (Romania) Constantin Teașcă (1979–1981)
- (Romania) Marcel Pigulea (1984–1985)
- (Romania) Spiridon Niculescu (1985–1986)
- (Romania) Spiridon Niculescu (1994)
- (Romania) Viorel Ion (2004–2005)
- (Romania) Liviu Ciobotariu (2006–2007)
- (Romania) Spiridon Niculescu (2007–2008)
- (Romania) Viorel Tănase (2009–2011)
- (Romania) Eugen Baștină (2012)
- (Romania) Valentin Stan (2012–2013)
- (Romania) Octavian Grigore (2013)
- (Romania) Costel Enache (2014)
