= CS Sportul Studențesc Bucharest =

Romanian ice hockey team

Sportul Studenţesc
- City: Bucharest
- League: Romanian Hockey League
- Founded: 1916
- Home arena: Mihai Flamaropol (capacity: 8,000)

Franchise history
- CS Sportul Studenţesc Bucharest

CS Sportul Studenţesc Bucharest is a professional ice hockey team in Bucharest, Romania. They participate in the Romanian Hockey League, the top level of ice hockey in Romania.

The club was founded in 1916.
