= Steaua Rangers =

- City: Bucharest
- League: Romanian Hockey League (1951–present); MOL Liga (2008–2009)
- Founded: 1951
- Home arena: Berceni Arena (capacity: 800)
- Colours
- Owner: Ministry of National Defense
- General manager: Nelu Alexe
- Head coach: Nelu Alexe
- Captain: Ioan Timaru
- Website: Website

Franchise history
- Steaua Rangers

The Steaua Rangers are a Romanian professional ice hockey club that currently plays in the Romanian Hockey League. They play their home games at the Berceni Arena and sometimes at the Allianz-Țiriac Arena in Otopeni.

== History ==
The hockey team was founded in 1951 as CCA București and existed alongside other sections (e.g., football, handball, basketball) in the Steaua București sports club. In 1961, their name was changed to CSA Steaua București. With 40 championship titles and 31 cup victories, Steaua is the most successful ice hockey team in Romania. They last won the Championship in 2006, and the Cup in 2008.

In 2008, Steaua joined the MOL Liga along with CS Progym Gheorgheni in addition to the Romanian Hockey League. They finished in sixth place out of ten participants. Steaua did not return to the league in 2009-10, due to financial issues.

== Achievements ==
- Campionatul Național:
  - Champions (40): 1953, 1955, 1956, 1958, 1959, 1961, 1962, 1964, 1965, 1966, 1967, 1969, 1970, 1974, 1975, 1977, 1978, 1980, 1982, 1983, 1984, 1985, 1986, 1987, 1988, 1989, 1990, 1991, 1992, 1993, 1994, 1995, 1996, 1998, 1999, 2001, 2002, 2003, 2005, 2006
- Cupa României:
  - Winners (33): 1969, 1973, 1974, 1975, 1976, 1977, 1978, 1980, 1981, 1982, 1984, 1985, 1986, 1987, 1989, 1990-spring, 1990-autumn, 1991, 1992, 1993, 1994, 1995, 1996, 1998-spring, 1998-autumn, 1999, 2000, 2002, 2004, 2005, 2008, 2011-autumn, 2012

== Notable players ==
- Mihai Flamaropol
- Adam Krug
- Cam Severson
- Dezső Varga

== Gallery ==
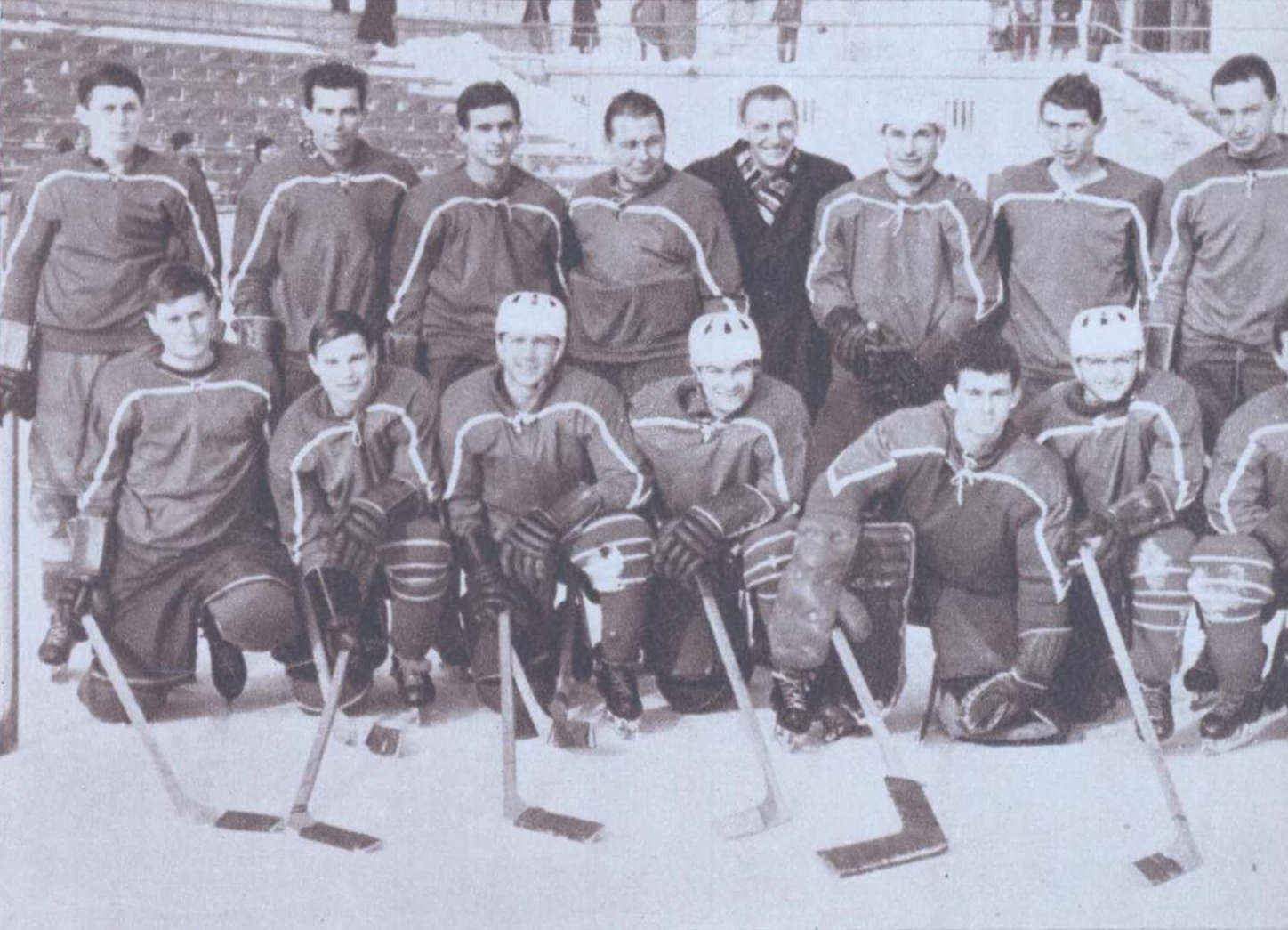

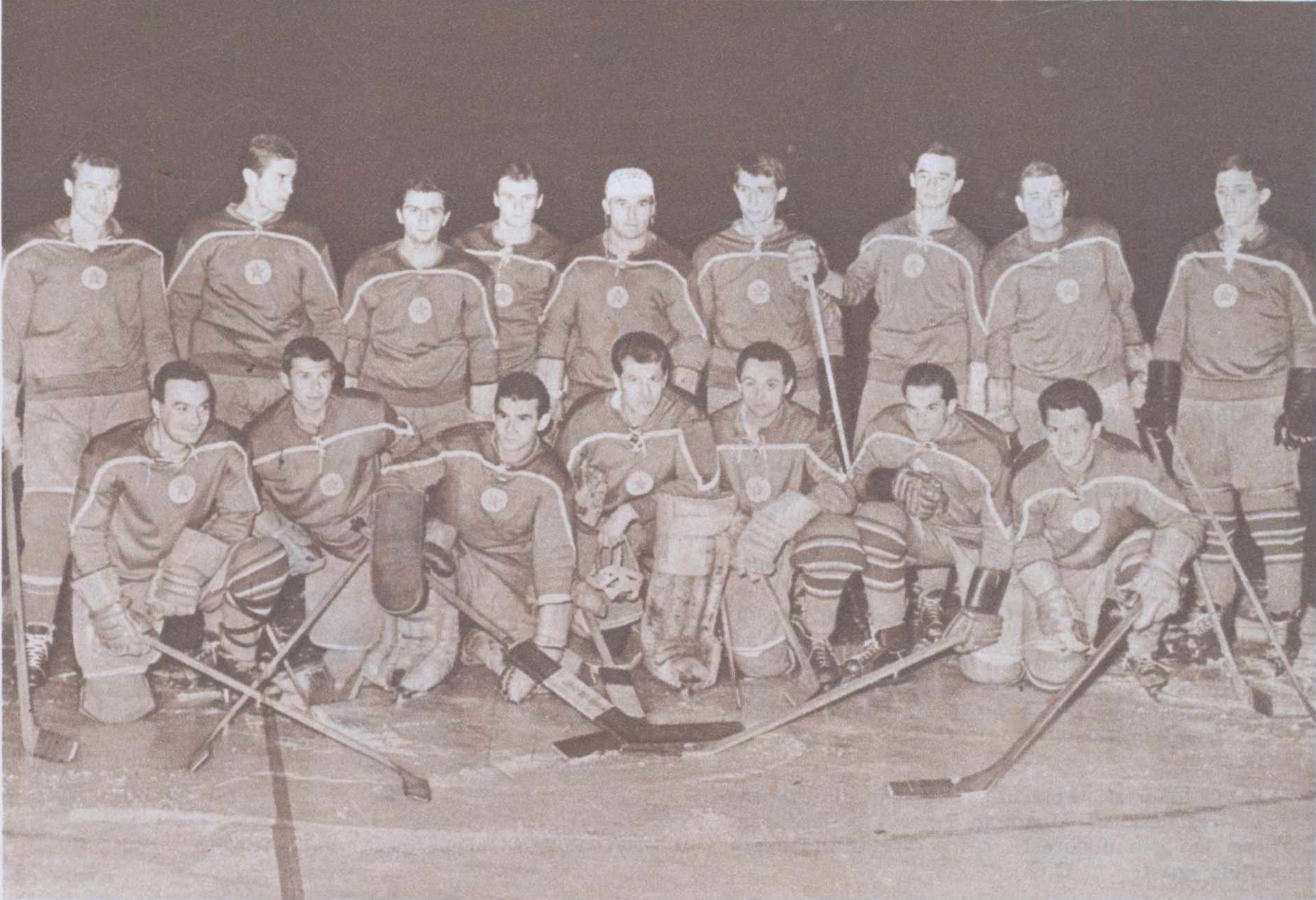

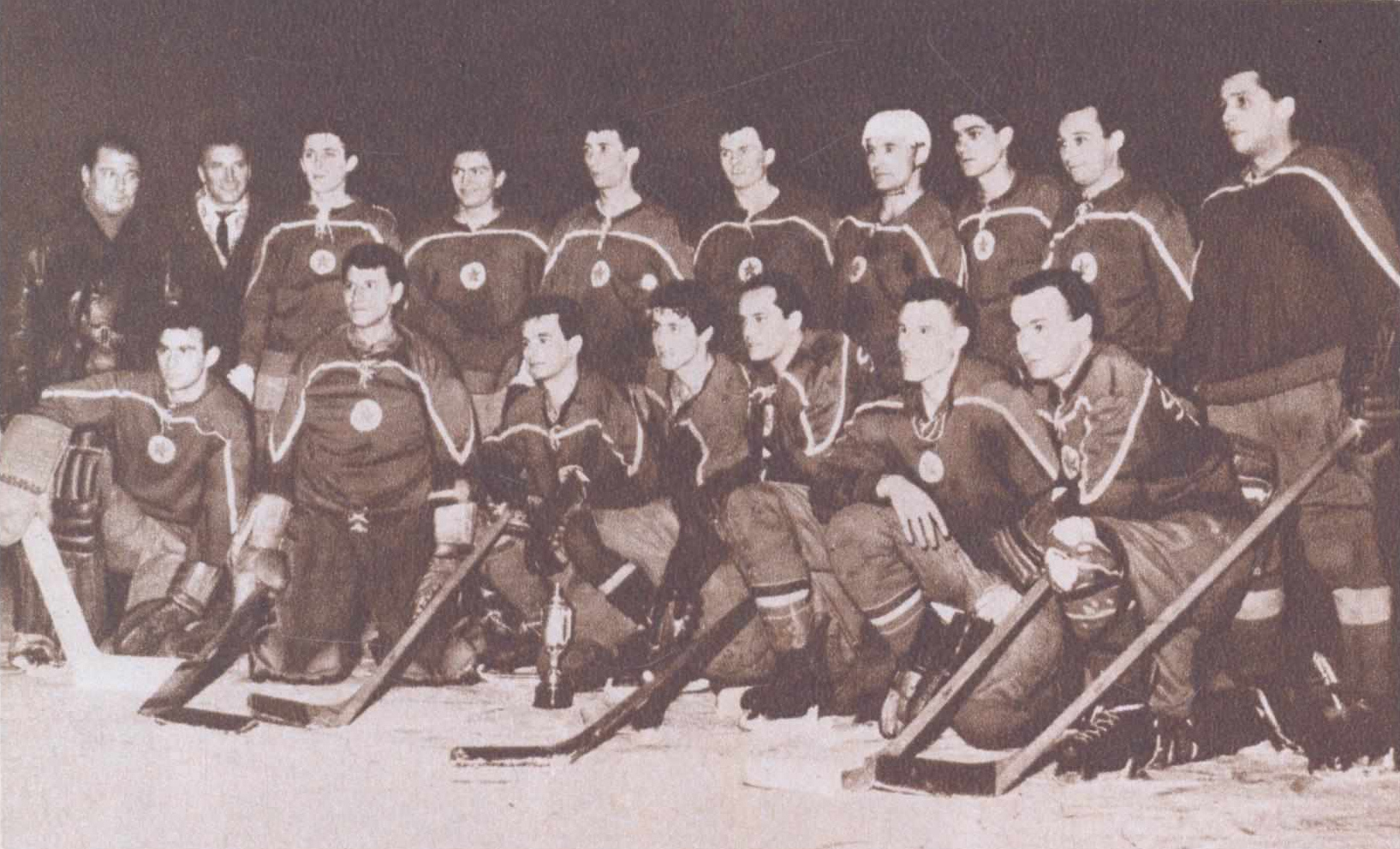

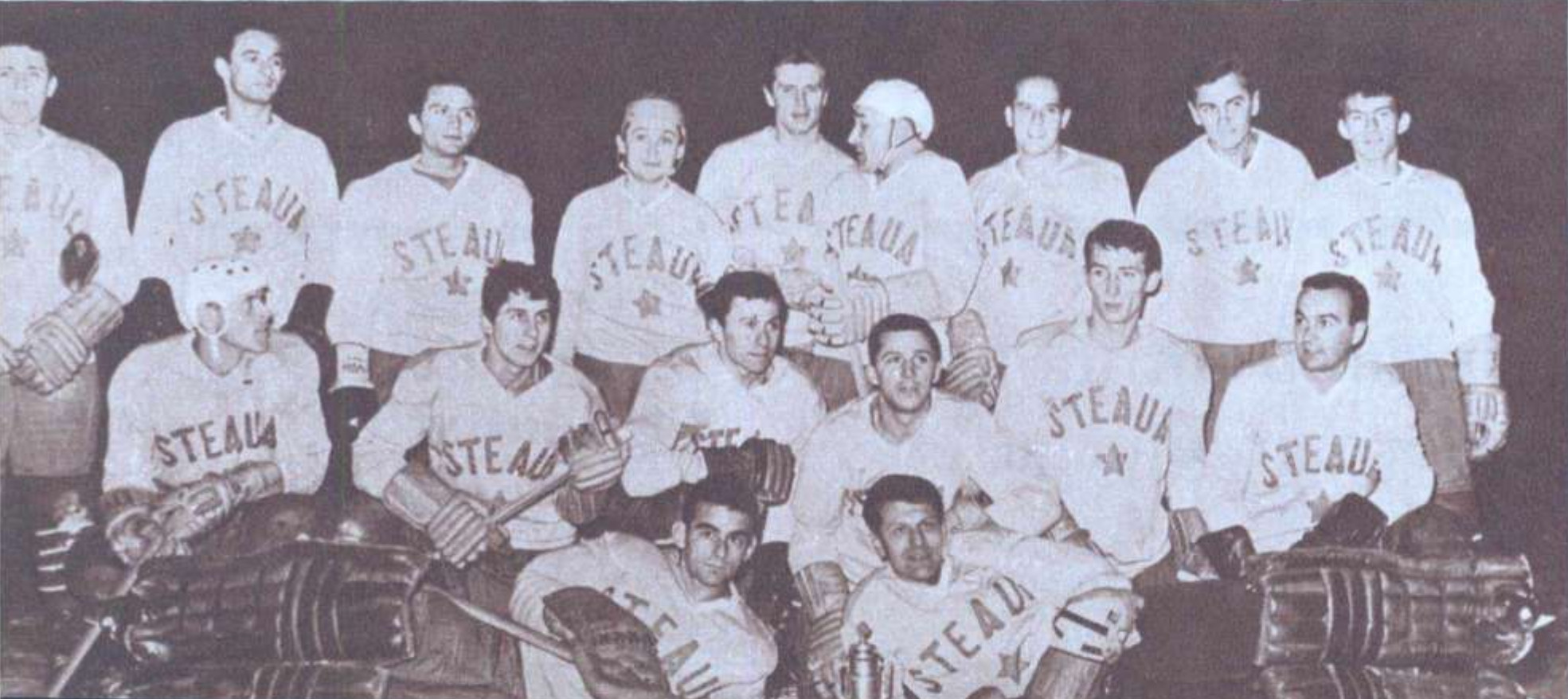

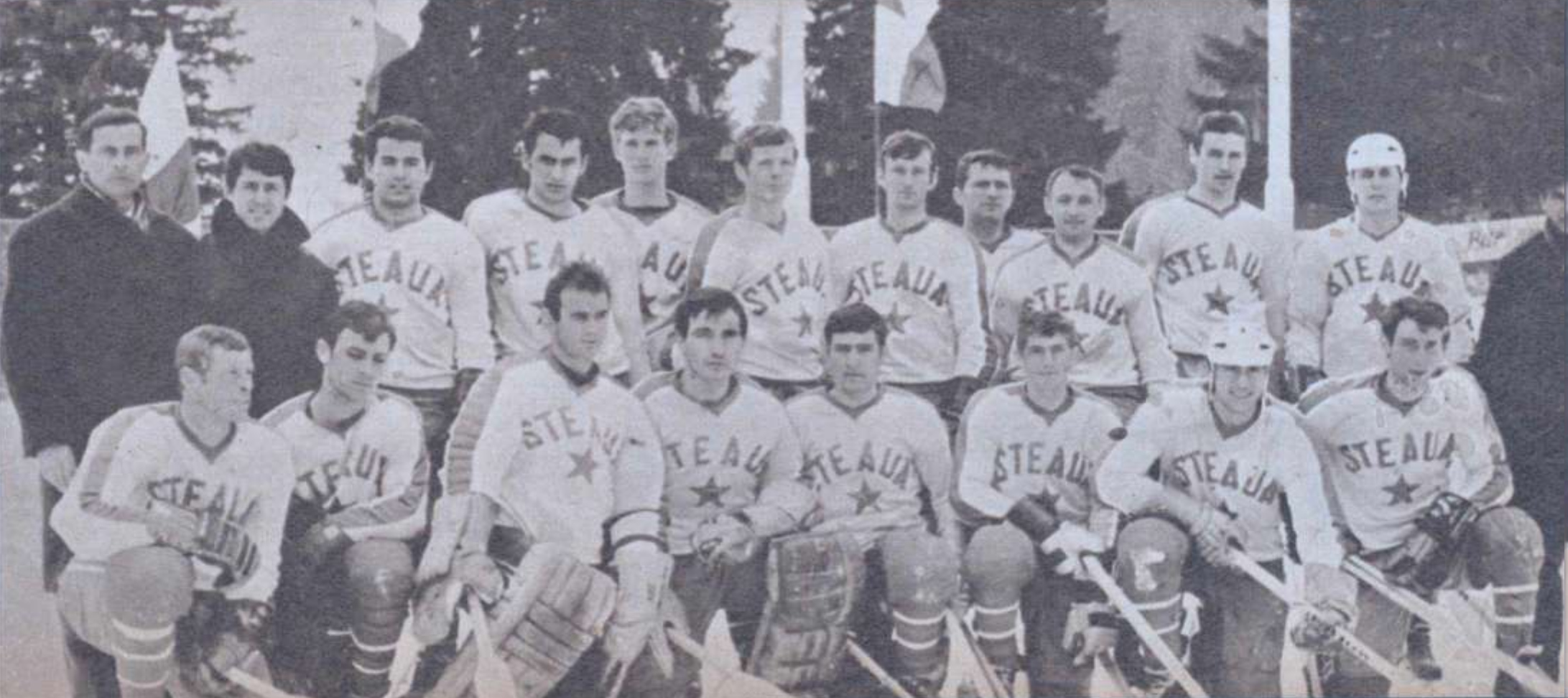
