= CSA Steaua București =

Multi-sports club in Bucharest, Romania

Steaua București
- Full name: Clubul Sportiv al Armatei Steaua București
- Nickname: Militarii (The Military Men); Roș-albaștrii (The Red and Blues)
- Short name: Steaua
- Founded: 7 June 1947; 78 years ago
- Location: Ghencea Boulevard 35, sector 6, Bucharest
- Colours: Red, Blue
- President: Eduart Danilof (interim)
- Website: www.csasteaua.ro

Clubul Sportiv al Armatei Steaua București, commonly known as CSA Steaua București (Romanian pronunciation: [ˈste̯awa bukuˈreʃtʲ]) or simply Steaua, is a major multi-sport club based in Bucharest and run by the Ministry of National Defence. It is one of the most successful clubs in Romania and among the most successful multi-sport clubs in Europe. Founded on 7 June 1947 as Asociația Sportivă a Armatei București (lit. 'Army Sports Association Bucharest'), the club changed its name several times before settling on Steaua (English: The Star) in 1961.

The club is most known for its football team, also called CSA Steaua București. Other sections belonging to the club are rugby, ice hockey (autonomous – Hochei Club Steaua Suki București), handball, water polo, basketball, volleyball, athletics, swimming, gymnastics, boxing, rowing, canoeing, shooting, weightlifting, fencing, tennis, cycling, and judo.

== History ==
The first Romanian Army sports club was formed on 7 June 1947, following a decree signed by General Mihail Lascăr, High Commander of the Romanian Royal Army. The club was called ASA București (Asociația Sportivă a Armatei București, transl. Army Sports Association), with seven different sections (football, fencing, volleyball, boxing, shooting, athletics, and tennis), and its leadership was entrusted to General-Major Oreste Alexandrescu. The decision was made as several officers were already competing for different clubs, providing a strong foundation for future competitive teams. This was also the year of the club's first national title, achieved by Gheorghe Viziru in tennis.

Previous names	Period
Asociația Sportivă a Armatei (ASA) București	1947–1948
Clubul Sportiv Central al Armatei (CSCA) București	1948–1950
Casa Centrală a Armatei (CCA) București	1950–1961
Clubul Sportiv al Armatei (CSA) Steaua București	1961–present

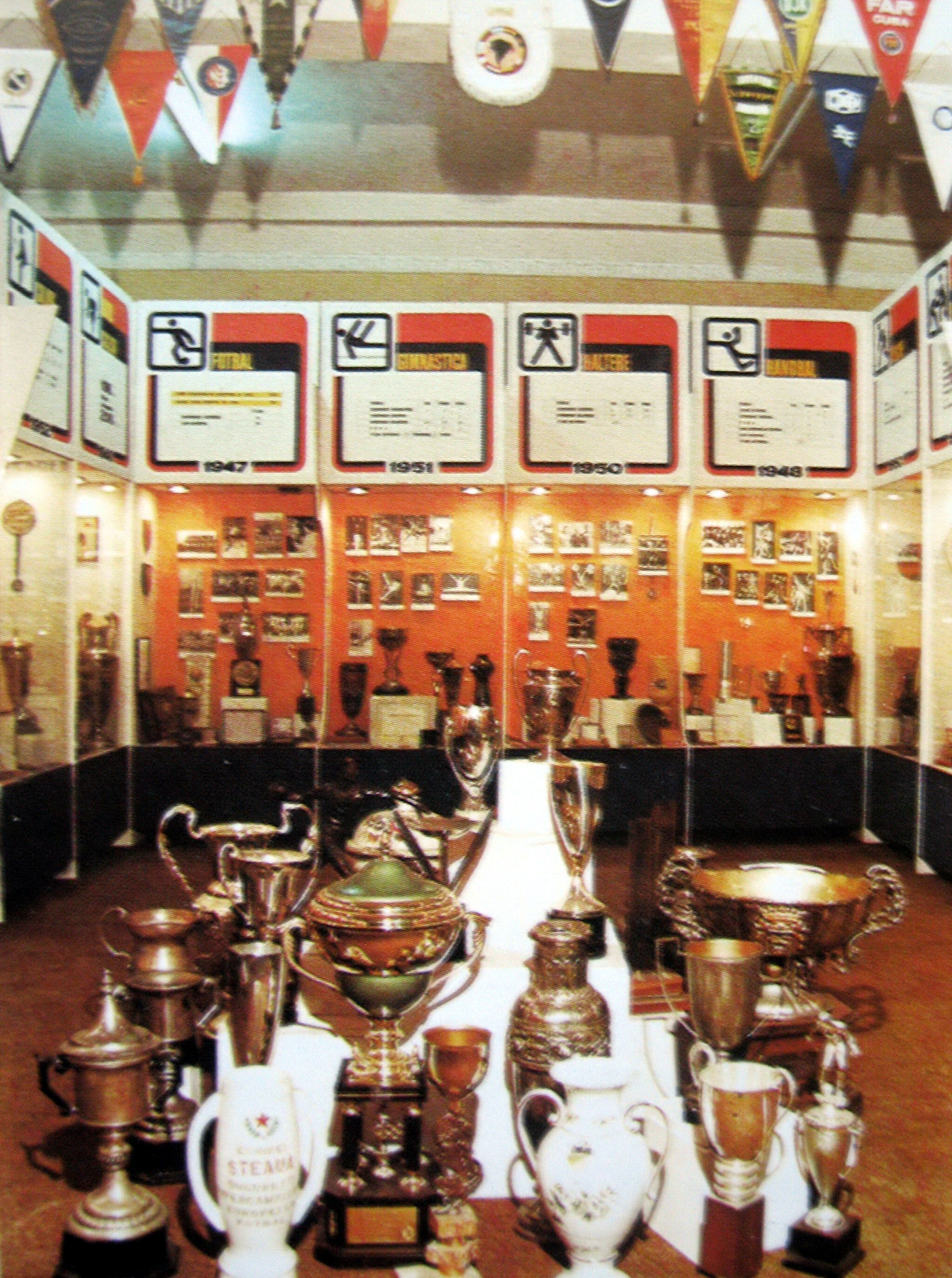
The trophy room

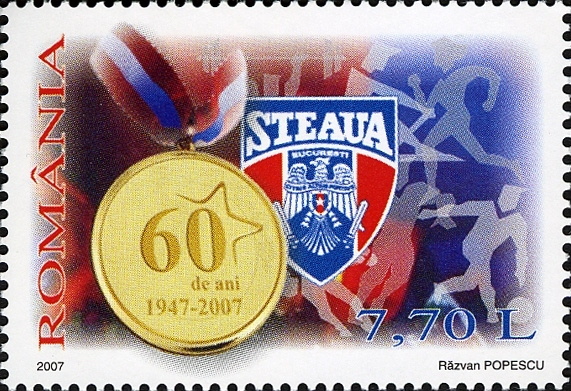
Stamp of CSA Steaua, 2007

As the Romanian Royal Army turned into the People's Army following the coup d'état at the end of 1947, which saw Romania transformed from a monarchy to a people's republic, the club changed its name multiple times. On 5 June 1948, by Order 289 of the Ministry of National Defence, ASA became CSCA (Clubul Sportiv Central al Armatei, transl. Central Sports Club of the Army), together with the society's first crest (an A-labeled red star, symbol of the Red Army, on a blue disc). In March 1950, CSCA changed its name to CCA (Casa Centrală a Armatei, transl. Central House of the Army). In 1961, CCA changed its names for the final time to CSA Steaua București (Clubul Sportiv al Armatei Steaua, transl. Army Sports Club Steaua). The name Steaua is Romanian for The Star and was adopted because of the presence, as in other Eastern-European Army teams, of a red star on their badge. The colour of the star was later changed to yellow to symbolize Romania's tri-colour red, yellow and blue flag.

On 9 April 1974, the Complexul Sportiv Steaua (Steaua Sports Complex) opened. It comprised a central football-use arena (30,000 capacity Stadionul Ghencea), six other training pitches, also used by the rugby team, and a mini-hotel for the athletes. Today, Complexul Sportiv Steaua has been leased for a 49-year period to the football club, with plans to renovate.

The club's most successful sections on an international scale have been the handball team, who have been European champions twice, the football who have been European champions once, and the volleyball, gymnastics, tennis, athletics, shooting, fencing, rowing, and canoeing teams. Former tennis star Ilie Năstase began his professional career at the club. Artistic gymnast Petre Mihăiuc participated at the 1972 Summer Olympics.

== Sections ==
=== Football ===
The football section was one of the seven sections formed at CSA Steaua's foundation, on 7 June 1947. The team's breakthrough came in 1986, when they became the first European champions from an Eastern country by winning the European Champions Cup. Since then, they have won the National Championships 21 times, the Romanian Cup 20 times, the Romanian Super Cup four times, the European Champions Cup once and the European Supercup once. Over 60 percent of the population of Romania have named Steaua as their favourite team.

The club's football department was once thought to have separated from CSA Steaua in 1998. This was later found to be incorrect, as Tica Danilescu, a former club employee, revealed in 2017. According to Danilescu, the nonprofit known as AFC Steaua București never bought the football department, as believed, but was only brought on as an administrator. The nonprofit was allowed to use the Steaua brand and name, but could not sell them. The team now known as FCSB had previously made use of the Steaua brand; however, after the Ministry of National Defense sued FC FCSB in 2011, claiming that the Romanian Army were the owners of the Steaua logo, colours, honours and name, the executive committee of the Romanian Football Federation approved an application to modify the name of the club from "SC Fotbal Club Steaua București SA", as it was previously known, to "SC Fotbal Club FCSB SA". This took place on 30 March 2017, following more judiciary sentences and the decision to pay the CSA Steaua owners 38 million euros for the illegal use of their name.

CSA Steaua București announced they would reactivate their football department in the summer of 2017. The team started training in July 2017, with Marius Lăcătuș as head coach. The team was introduced in the Liga IV. As of 2026, the team play in Liga II.

=== Gymnastics ===
The Gymnastics department at Steaua is one of the largest gymnastics clubs in Romania and has produced gymnasts who have competed at World Championship and Olympic level. Notable gymnasts who were members of the club include Sandra Izbașa, a double Olympic champion at the 2012 Summer Olympics on the Vault and Floor; Alexandra Eremia, who won a gold and bronze medal at the 2004 Summer Olympics; Silvia Stroescu, a gold medallist in the Team event in the 2004 Olympics, and Marian Drăgulescu who won a silver medal and two bronze medals at the 2004 Olympics, as well as eight gold medals at the World Championships and ten gold medals in the European Championships.

=== Handball (men) ===
The handball team Steaua MFA București won the European Cup in 1967–68, winning 13–11 against Dukla Praha, and in 1976–77 when they won 21–20 against CSKA Moskva. They also won the European Challenge Cup in 2005–06, with scores of 21–26 and 34–27 against SC Horta. They were also runners-up two times in the European Cup in 1970–71, losing 16–17 against VfL Gummersbach, and 1988–89, with scores of 30–24 and 23–37 against SKA Minsk.

The team has also won the seven-player Romanian Handball Championship 27 times (1962–63, 1966–67, 1967–68, 1968–69, 1969–70, 1970–71, 1971–72, 1972–73, 1973–74, 1974–75, 1975–76, 1976–77, 1978–79, 1979–80, 1980–81, 1981–82, 1982–83, 1983–84, 1984–85, 1986–87, 1987–88, 1988–89, 1989–90, 1993–94, 1995–96, 1999–00 and 2000–01), the eleven-player Romanian Handball Championship seven times (1950, 1951, 1952, 1954, 1955, 1957 and 1961) and the Romanian Cup seven times (1980–81, 1984–85, 1989–90, 1996–97, 1999–00, 2000–01 and 2006–07).

The team play their home matches at Chiajna Sports Hall. The current head coach is Sandu Iacob. Derby matches against HCM Constanța and Dinamo are highly attended.

Former members of the team include Ștefan Birtalan, Gheorghe Gruia, Cristian Gațu, Radu Voina, Vasile Stângă, Marian Dumitru and Alexandru Dedu.

=== Ice hockey ===
Steaua București Hockey was founded in 1951. Hochei Club Steaua Suki București has been an autonomous club since 2004, but still belongs to CSA Steaua. It is the most successful club in Romania, having won the domestic league 40 times, a world record for ice hockey national championships. They compete in a national competition consisting of 6 teams, with their main rival being SC Miercurea Ciuc. Steaua plays SC Miercurea Ciuc in the final every year in a best-of-seven tournament. The derby match between Steaua and SC Miercurea Ciuc is the biggest ice hockey match in the country and one of an immense rivalry, as Steaua fans are mainly of Romanian nationality while Miercurea Ciuc's are mainly Hungarian. The team play their home matches at the Allianz-Țiriac Arena Ice Rink. The current coach is Nelu Alexe.

=== Rugby union ===
The Steaua București rugby team has won the domestic league 24 times since 1947. Romanian rugby club teams do not participate in major European competitions due to value differences between them and leading teams in Europe. Instead, a Romania national rugby union team, consisting mainly of Steaua players, participates every year in the European Challenge Cup as București Rugby.

The team plays its home matches on the rugby fields, inside the Steaua sports complex, and sometimes on the Steaua Stadium. The current coach is Viorel Lucaci.

=== Basketball (men) ===
The CSA Steaua basketball team was founded in 1952. The club won the Romanian Basketball Championship 21 times: in 1955–56, 1957–58, 1958–59, 1959–60, 1960–61, 1961–62, 1962–63, 1963–64, 1965–66, 1969–70, 1977–78, 1979–80, 1980–81, 1981–82, 1983–84, 1984–85, 1985–86, 1986–87, 1988–89, 1989–90 and 1990–91. The team's most notable achievement was reaching the semi-finals at the 1960–61 FIBA European Champions Cup.

After the Romanian Revolution, Baschet Club Steaua București was the first basketball club in Romania to turn private. However, after only a few years it went bankrupt, and from then onwards CSA Steaua only operated a youth club for basketball, under the name of Clubul Sportiv Școlar Steaua București (English: School Sports Club Steaua). However, in 2009, BC Targoviste merged with Steaua Turabo and enrolled in the first division, under the name BC Steaua Turabo București. In 2013 CS Municipal Bucuresti merged with CSA Steaua Bucuresti under the name Steaua CSM EximBank Bucuresti. As of 2025, the team is known as CSA Steaua București.

=== Volleyball (men) ===
The Steaua volleyball team were European Cup runners-up twice: in 1969, against CSKA Sofia, and in 1979, against Cervena Hvezda Bratislava. They were also Cup Winners' Cup runners-up three times, losing to Elektrotechnika Riga in 1977, to Cervena Hvezda Bratislava in 1981, and to Panini Modena in 1986. They were Divizia A1 champions in 1951, 1952, 1954, 1957, 1967, 1968, 1969, 1960, 1971, 1978, 1986, 1987, 1988, 1989, 1990 and 1991.

=== Water polo ===
Even though the Romanian national water polo team has had notable performances, club water polo plays only a minor role in international competitions. Steaua are one of the leading teams inside a national league with only four professional clubs, the rest being amateur. The team's official name is CSA Steaua Stirom București, named after their sponsors.

== Club records ==
Source.

Competitions	Gold	Silver	Bronze	Total
Summer Olympic Games	30	35	36	101
World Championships	190	203	255	687
European Championships	359	399	467	1225
Universiade and World University Championships	58	41	47	146
World Cup and European Cups	79	85	91	255
CISM and Spartakiad	94	129	161	384
Balkan Games	1311	960	603	2874
Romanian Championships	12768	—	—	12768
Romanian Cups	1386	—	—	1386
