= HSC Csíkszereda =

Hoki Sport Klub Csíkszereda
- City: Miercurea Ciuc
- League: Romanian Hockey League (1933–present); Erste Liga (2008–present); Panonian League (2002–2004)
- Founded: 1929
- Home arena: Lajos Vákár Ice Hall (capacity: 4,000)
- Colours: Blue, white
- Head coach: Václav Novák
- Affiliates: SC Csíkszereda Farm
- Website: Official website

Franchise history
- HSC Csíkszereda

Hoki Sport Klub Csíkszereda (Romanian: Hockey Sport Club Miercurea Ciuc) is a professional ice hockey club based in Miercurea Ciuc, Romania. They play in the country's top-level championship, the Romanian Hockey League, and also participate in the international competition Erste Liga, which features teams from Hungary. SC is one of the most successful teams in the domestic championship with 15 titles, including six in a row between 2007 and 2012.

== History ==
Situated in the Ciuc Basin, one of the coldest regions in the country, it offers an ideal background for winter sports. Skating on meadows flooded by a watercourse began in the 1870s, and the first skating association, the Csíkszeredai Korcsolyázó Egylet was founded in 1881.

The birth of the ice hockey team was in 1929, when some young men saw a film about an ice hockey match and became encouraged to form their own club. Upon hearing of the creation of the new team, Bucharest-based Tenis Club Român invited Csíkszereda to a friendly match, that was won by the hosts 4–0. On 24–25 January 1931 Tenis Club was called for a rematch, where they first clinched another 4–0 victory, however, on the following day the game ended 1–1, with Jenő Császár scoring the first-ever goal for Csíkszereda. This goal was also the first in the history of Romanian ice hockey that was photographed.

The team entered the Romanian championship in 1933, but due to the lack of financial and infrastructural support they could not compete with Bucharest clubs. In addition, from the mid-1930s more and more talented players left the club to join league the rivals HC Brâila and Telefon Club, which later became the national champion.

After the Second Vienna Award in 1940, the city was reassigned to Hungary, and the team entered the Hungarian league. The skate rink of Csíkszereda was modernized and it hosted the national championship in 1943–44. Following the World War II the Second Vienna Award was cancelled and the area fell under Romanian administration again.

The club's first success came in 1949, when they obtained the Romanian Hockey League title, which was followed by another 4 titles until 1963. In January 1971 the newly built ice hall was handed over. The club suffered a setback in the coming decades and it could not win another league title until 1997. In 1999 the ice hall took the name of club legend and founder of the hockey team, Lajos Vákár. Since the second part of the 2000s Csíkszereda proved to be untouchable in the domestic championship and they are also one of the dominant teams in the MOL Liga.

== Achievements ==
- Romanian Hockey League:
  - Winners (17): 1949, 1952, 1957, 1960, 1963, 1997, 2000, 2004, 2007, 2008, 2009, 2010, 2011, 2012, 2013, 2018, 2022
- Romanian Cup:
  - Winners (15) :1950, 1952, 1995, 2002, 2004, 2007, 2008, 2010, 2011, 2014, 2016, 2018, 2019, 2020, 2022
- Panonian League:
  - Winners (1) : 2004
- Erste Liga:
  - Winners (4) : 2011, 2020, 2021, 2022

== Notable players ==
- Dezső Varga: Played in Miercurea Ciuc from 1959 to 1965, later was captain of the Romania men's national ice hockey team

== Sources ==
- Kész, Lóránd (2009), A csíkszeredai jégkorong türténete.
