= Romanian Hockey League =

Ice hockey league

- Current season, competition or edition: 2025–26 Romanian Hockey League season
- Sport: Ice hockey
- Founded: 1925; 101 years ago
- No. of teams: 9
- Country: Romania
- Most recent champions: ACSH Gheorgheni (2) (2025–26)
- Most titles: Steaua Rangers (40 titles)
- Broadcaster: TVR Sport
- Domestic cup: Cupa României
- Website: rohockey.ro

The Romanian Hockey League (Campionatul Național) is the highest level of Romanian ice hockey. It is governed by the Federația Română de Hochei pe Gheață (FRHG) (Romanian Ice Hockey Federation).

== Romanian clubs in European competitions in the 2024-25 season ==
Competition	Team	Progress
Erste Liga	CSM Corona Brașov	League
Erste Liga	HSC Csíkszereda	League
Erste Liga	Gyergyói HK	League
IIHF Continental Cup	CSM Corona Brașov	Second round

== 2025/26 teams ==
Clubs	City	Arena	Capacity	Founded	Titles
Steaua București	Bucharest	Allianz-Țiriac Arena, Otopeni	450	1951	40
HSC Csíkszereda	Miercurea Ciuc	Lajos Vákár Ice Hall	4,000	1929	17
Gyergyói	Gheorgheni	Gyergyószentmiklósi Műjégpálya	1,000	1949	2
Corona Brașov	Brașov	Brașov Olympic Ice Rink	2,000	2007	5
CSM Galați	Galați	Galați Ice Rink	5,000	1932	2
Háromszéki Ágyúsok	Târgu Secuiesc	Deme László Ice Rink, Târgu Secuiesc	550	2021	0
Sportul Studențesc	Bucharest	Felcsíki Műjégpálya, Cârța, Harghita	1,000	1916	0
Sapientia U23	Cârța	Patinoarul Cârța	1,000	2005	0
Red Hawks București	Bucharest	Berceni Arena	800	2025	0

== Champions ==
- 1925 Braşovia Braşov
- 1926 No championship
- 1927 Hochei Club București
- 1928 Hochei Club București
- 1929 Hochei Club București
- 1930 Tenis Club București
- 1931 Tenis Club București
- 1932 Tenis Club București
- 1933 Tenis Club București
- 1934 Tenis Club București
- 1935 Telefon Club București
- 1936 Bragadiru București
- 1937 Telefon Club București
- 1938 Dragoș Vodă Cernăuți
- 1939 No championship
- 1940 Rapid București
- 1941 Juventus București
- 1942 Juventus București
- 1943 No championship
- 1944 Venus București
- 1945 Juventus București
- 1946 Juventus București
- 1947 Juventus București
- 1948 No championship
- 1949 Avântul IPEIL Miercurea Ciuc
- 1950 RATA Târgu Mureș
- 1951 RATA Târgu Mureș
- 1952 Avântul Miercurea Ciuc
- 1953 Steaua București
- 1954 Știința Cluj
- 1955 Steaua București
- 1956 Steaua București
- 1957 Recolta Miercurea Ciuc
- 1958 Steaua București
- 1959 Steaua București
- 1960 Voința Miercurea Ciuc
- 1961 Steaua București
- 1962 Steaua București
- 1963 Voința Miercurea Ciuc
- 1964 Steaua București
- 1965 Steaua București
- 1966 Steaua București
- 1967 Steaua București
- 1968 Dinamo București
- 1969 Steaua București
- 1970 Steaua București
- 1971 Dinamo București
- 1972 Dinamo București
- 1973 Dinamo București
- 1974 Steaua București
- 1975 Steaua București
- 1976 Dinamo București
- 1977 Steaua București
- 1978 Steaua București
- 1979 Dinamo București
- 1980 Steaua București
- 1981 Dinamo București
- 1982 Steaua București
- 1983 Steaua București
- 1984 Steaua București
- 1985 Steaua București
- 1986 Steaua București
- 1987 Steaua București
- 1988 Steaua București
- 1989 Steaua București
- 1990 Steaua București
- 1991 Steaua București
- 1992 Steaua București
- 1993 Steaua București
- 1994 Steaua București
- 1995 Steaua București
- 1996 Steaua București
- 1997 SC Miercurea Ciuc
- 1998 Steaua București
- 1999 Steaua București
- 2000 SC Miercurea Ciuc
- 2001 Steaua București
- 2002 Steaua București
- 2003 Steaua București
- 2004 SC Miercurea Ciuc
- 2005 Steaua București
- 2006 Steaua București
- 2007 SC Miercurea Ciuc
- 2008 SC Miercurea Ciuc
- 2009 SC Miercurea Ciuc
- 2010 SC Miercurea Ciuc
- 2011 HSC Csíkszereda
- 2012 HSC Csíkszereda
- 2013 HSC Csíkszereda
- 2014 Corona Braşov
- 2015 Dunărea Galați
- 2016 Dunărea Galați
- 2017 Corona Braşov
- 2018 HSC Csíkszereda
- 2019 Corona Braşov
- 2020 No championship
- 2021 Corona Braşov
- 2022 HSC Csíkszereda
- 2023 Corona Braşov
- 2024 Corona Braşov
- 2025 ACSH Gheorgheni
- 2026 ACSH Gheorgheni

== Titles by team ==
Titles	Team	Year
40	Steaua Rangers	1953, 1955, 1956, 1958, 1959, 1961, 1962, 1964, 1965, 1966, 1967, 1969, 1970, 1974, 1975, 1977, 1978, 1980, 1982, 1983, 1984, 1985, 1986, 1987, 1988, 1989, 1990, 1991, 1992, 1993, 1994, 1995, 1996, 1998, 1999, 2001, 2002, 2003, 2005, 2006
17	SC Miercurea Ciuc/HSC Csíkszereda	1949, 1952, 1957, 1960, 1963, 1997, 2000, 2004, 2007, 2008, 2009, 2010, 2011, 2012, 2013, 2018, 2022
7	Dinamo București	1968, 1971, 1972, 1973, 1976, 1979, 1981
6	Corona Brașov	2014, 2017, 2019, 2021, 2023, 2024
5	Tenis Club București	1930, 1931, 1932, 1933, 1934
5	HC Juventus București	1941, 1942, 1945, 1946, 1947
3	HC București	1927, 1928, 1929
2	Telefon Club București	1935, 1937
2	Locomotiva RATA Târgu Mureș	1950, 1951
2	Dunărea Galați	2015, 2016
2	ACSH Gheorgheni	2025, 2026
1	Braşovia Braşov	1925
1	Dragoș Vodă Cernăuți	1938
1	HC Bragadiru București	1936
1	Rapid București	1940
1	Venus București	1944
1	Știința Cluj	1954
