= Karol Rusznyák =

Slovak ice hockey player

Personal information
- Nationality: Slovak
- Born: 26 November 1967 (age 57); Bratislava, Czechoslovakia

Sport
- Sport: Ice hockey

Karol Rusznyák (born 26 November 1967) is a Slovak ice hockey player. He competed in the men's tournament at the 1998 Winter Olympics.

== Career statistics ==
=== Regular season and playoffs ===
			Regular season					Playoffs
Season	Team	League	GP	G	A	Pts	PIM	GP	G	A	Pts	PIM
1984–85	HC Slovan Bratislava	TCH U20
1986–87	HC Slovan Bratislava	TCH	36	4	3	7	20	—	—	—	—	—
1987–88	HC Slovan Bratislava	TCH	44	4	6	10		—	—	—	—	—
1988–89	HC Slovan Bratislava	TCH	9	3	1	4	6	—	—	—	—	—
1989–90	TJ Vodní stavby Tábor	CZE.3		11				—	—	—	—	—
1990–91	HC Slovan Bratislava	TCH
1991–92	HC Slovan Bratislava	TCH	35	8	11	19		3	0	1	1
1992–93	HC Slovan Bratislava	TCH	36	10	17	27	122	—	—	—	—	—
1993–94	HC Slovan Bratislava	SVK	41	19	17	36		—	—	—	—	—
1994–95	HC Slovan Bratislava	SVK	34	23	29	52	60	9	6	6	12	16
1995–96	HC Slovan Bratislava	SVK	18	8	6	14	42	—	—	—	—	—
1995–96	HC Pojišťovna IB Pardubice	ELH	14	5	5	10	0	—	—	—	—	—
1996–97	HC Košice	SVK	38	11	22	33	82	—	—	—	—	—
1997–98	HC Slovan Bratislava	SVK	32	8	21	29	51	10	4	3	7	0
1998–99	HC Slovan Bratislava	SVK	29	15	20	35	38	10	2	7	9
1998–99	HK Trnava	SVK.2	2	2	3	5	2	—	—	—	—	—
1999–2000	Dukla Trenčín	SVK	37	17	18	35	26	7	5	0	5	2
2000–01	EHC Wolfsburg	GER.3	36	31	55	86	160	—	—	—	—	—
2001–02	EHC Wolfsburg	GER.2	51	19	35	54	105	4	1	5	6	27
2002–03	Alba Volán-FeVita	IEHL	11	5	7	12	14	—	—	—	—	—
2002–03	Alba Volán-FeVita	HUN	11	11	20	31	12	—	—	—	—	—
2003–04	Alba Volán-FeVita	IEHL	21	6	9	15	26	—	—	—	—	—
2003–04	Alba Volán-FeVita	HUN	11	11	20	31	12	—	—	—	—	—
2004–05	Alba Volán-FeVita	IEHL	20	2	11	13	20	—	—	—	—	—
2004–05	Alba Volán-FeVita	HUN	15	6	8	14	6	—	—	—	—	—
2005–06	HK Trnava	SVK.2	2	0	2	2	0	—	—	—	—	—
2005–06	ETC Crimmitschau	GER.3	41	17	16	33	40	6	0	1	1	2
2006–07	UEC Mödling	AUT.3	19	26	32	58	80	4	4	4	8	33
2007–08	HC die 48er	AUT.3	14	7	17	24	12	3	0	2	2	2
TCH totals			160	29	38	67	—	3	0	1	1	—
SVK totals			229	102	132	234	299	36	17	16	33	18

=== International ===
Year	Team	Event	GP	G	A	Pts	PIM
1987	Czechoslovakia	WJC	7	0	5	5	2
1994	Slovakia	WC C	6	4	4	8	4
1998	Slovakia	OG	4	0	0	0	0
Senior totals			10	4	4	8	4

"Karol Rusznyak". Elite Prospects.
