= Michal Juraško =

Slovak ice hockey player

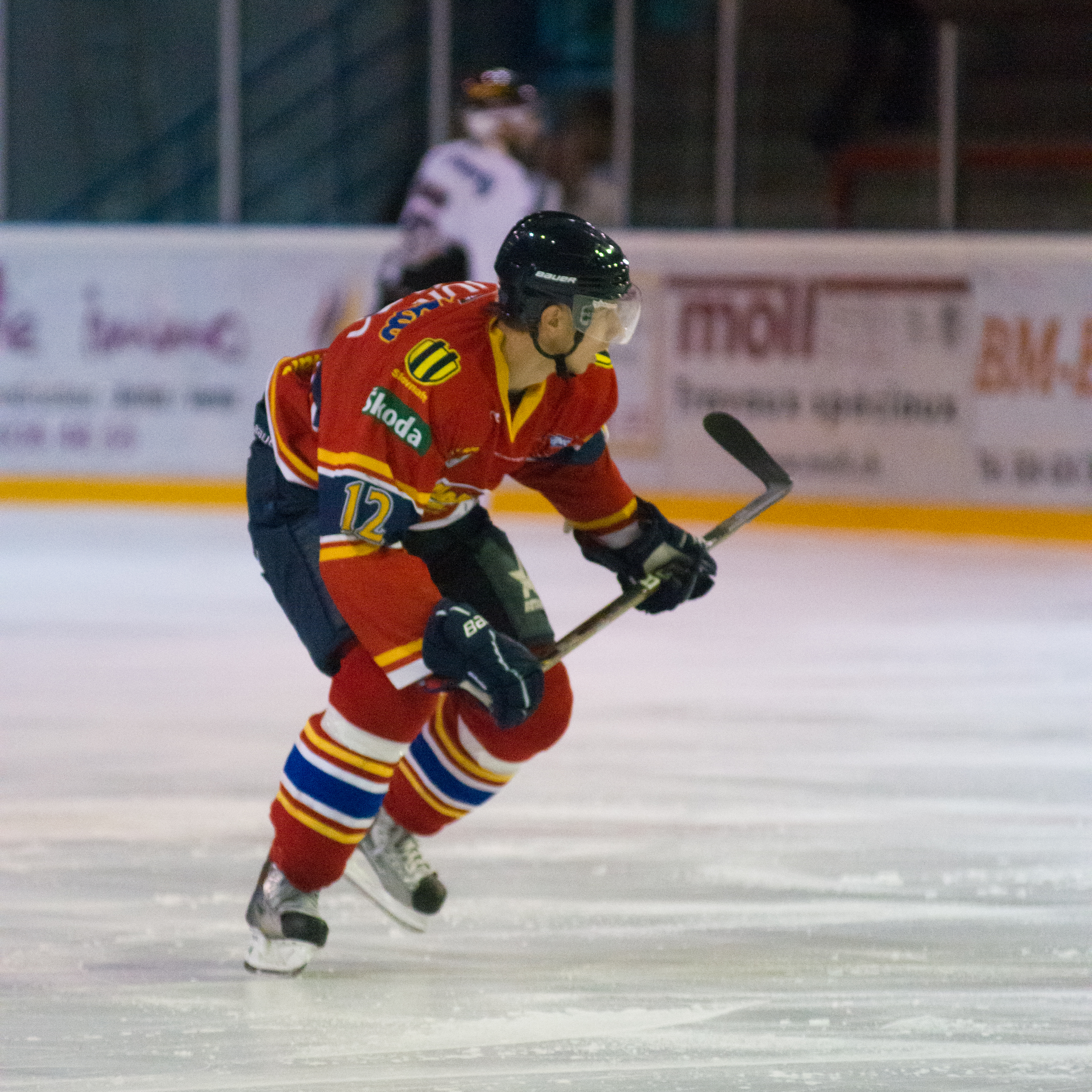
- Juraško in 2010
- Born: April 21, 1984 (age 40); Zvolen, Czechoslovakia
- Height: 5 ft 11 in (180 cm)
- Weight: 179 lb (81 kg; 12 st 11 lb)
- Position: Defence
- Shoots: Left
- Slovak Extraliga team Former teams: HC Nové Zámky; Újpesti TE; HKm Zvolen; MsHK Žilina
- Playing career: 2004–present

Michal Juraško (born April 21, 1984) is a Slovak professional ice hockey defenceman who is currently playing for HC Nové Zámky in the Slovak Extraliga.

== Career statistics ==
			Regular season					Playoffs
Season	Team	League	GP	G	A	Pts	PIM	GP	G	A	Pts	PIM
2003–04	HKM Zvolen U20	Slovak U20	42	7	10	17	62	3	0	0	0	8
2003–04	HKM Zvolen B	Slovak2	9	0	5	5	2	3	0	0	0	0
2004–05	Újpesti TE	Hungary	15	2	6	8	28	—	—	—	—	—
2005–06	Újpesti TE	IEL	22	0	6	6	6	1	0	0	0	4
2005–06	Újpesti TE	Hungary	—	—	—	—	—	—	—	—	—	—
2006–07	HKM Zvolen	Slovak	5	0	2	2	2	—	—	—	—	—
2006–07	Újpesti TE	Hungary	28	4	5	9	54	—	—	—	—	—
2006–07	Újpesti TE	IEL	23	3	2	5	26	—	—	—	—	—
2007–08	HKM Zvolen	Slovak	54	4	8	12	34	6	0	1	1	2
2008–09	HKM Zvolen	Slovak	51	2	5	7	52	13	1	0	1	16
2009–10	HKM Zvolen	Slovak	47	3	11	14	22	5	0	1	1	4
2010–11	HKM Zvolen	Slovak	55	3	12	15	40	7	1	0	1	0
2011–12	HKM Zvolen	Slovak	48	1	7	8	48	10	0	3	3	24
2012–13	HKM Zvolen	Slovak	44	5	18	23	59	17	3	1	4	2
2013–14	HKM Zvolen	Slovak	38	6	9	15	41	4	0	0	0	4
2014–15	HKM Zvolen	Slovak	54	3	15	18	14	7	0	2	2	2
2015–16	HKM Zvolen	Slovak	51	1	18	19	40	12	0	2	2	2
2016–17	HC 07 Detva	Slovak2	3	0	1	1	2	—	—	—	—	—
2016–17	MsHK Zilina	Slovak	38	2	13	15	10	11	0	2	2	6
2016–17	HKM Zvolen	Slovak	5	0	0	0	0	—	—	—	—	—
2017–18	MsHK Zilina	Slovak	45	2	8	10	12	6	0	0	0	0
2018–19	HC Nove Zamky	Slovak	13	0	1	1	4	—	—	—	—	—
Slovak totals			548	32	127	159	378	98	5	12	17	62
