= Eric Johansson (ice hockey) =

Swedish-Canadian ice hockey player (born 1982)

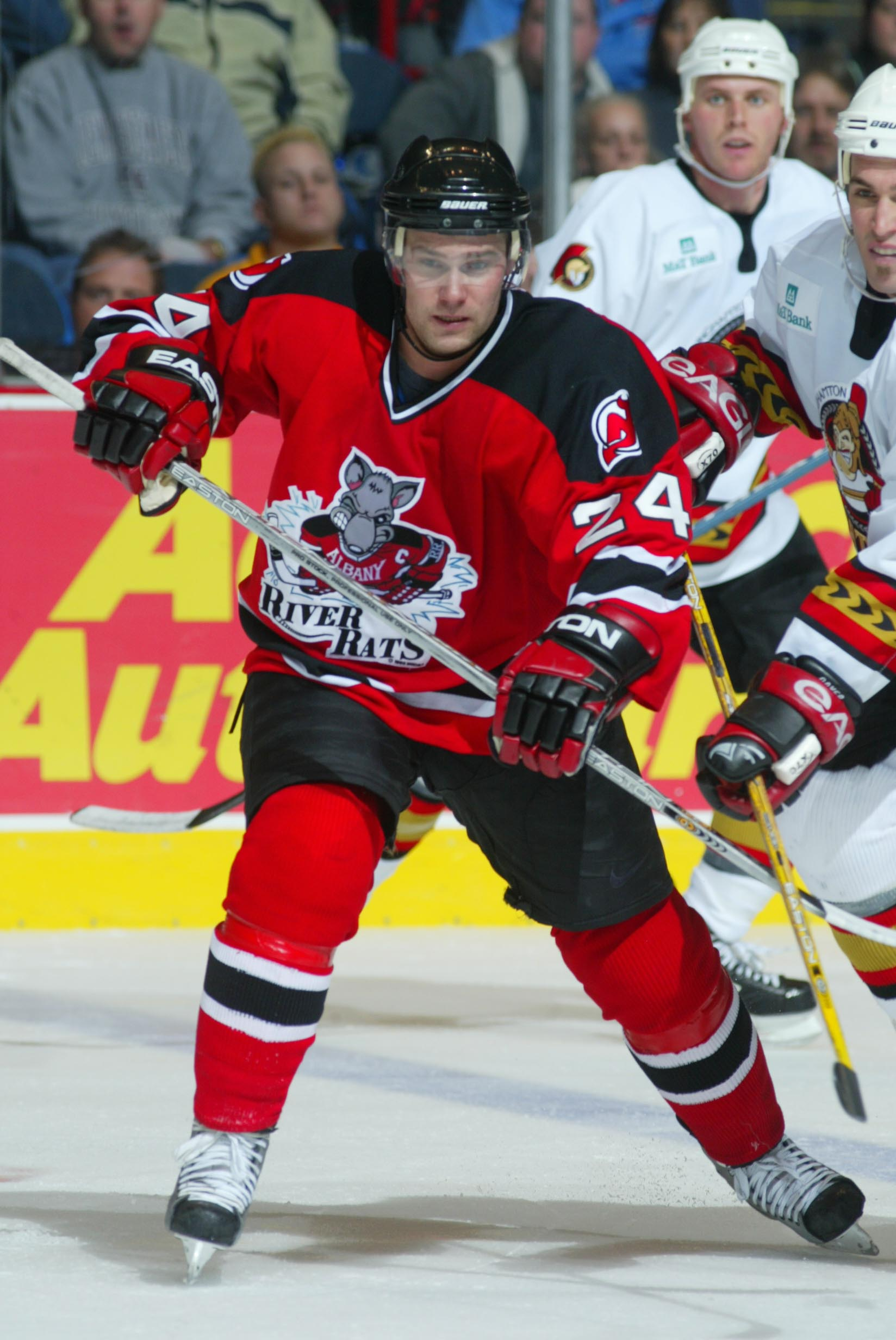
- Johansson with the Albany River Rats during the 2004-05 season
- Born: January 7, 1982 (age 44) Edmonton, Alberta, Canada
- Height: 6 ft 0 in (183 cm)
- Weight: 190 lb (86 kg; 13 st 8 lb)
- Position: Centre
- Shot: Left
- Played for: Mora IK; TPS; HV71; Fehérvár AV19; Ritten Sport; Herning Blue Fox; Gothiques d'Amiens; Pustertal Wölfe
- NHL draft: 255th overall, 2000; Minnesota Wild; 187th overall, 2002; New Jersey Devils
- Playing career: 2002–2018

Eric Johansson (born January 7, 1982) is a Swedish-Canadian former professional ice hockey player.

== Playing career ==
In 1997, Johansson started his hockey career, playing for Tri-City Americans in the junior league Western Hockey League. In the 2002–03 season, he joined the Albany River Rats in AHL, scoring 53 points in 151 games during the regular seasons. After three seasons with Albany, the last one spent primarily in ECHL with Augusta Lynx, he moved to Sweden and signed with Mora IK in the Swedish elite league Elitserien. After two seasons with the side he signed with another Elitserien team, HV71, after having started the season with TPS in the Finnish SM-liiga. During the Swedish playoff finals, Johansson scored the game-winning goal in game six and secured the championship for HV71.

In June 2008, he signed a two-year deal with Leksands IF in the Swedish second-tier league, HockeyAllsvenskan.

On October 23, 2010, Johansson signed with the Sapa Fehérvár AV19 of the Erste Bank Eishockey Liga league.

== Career statistics ==
			Regular season					Playoffs
Season	Team	League	GP	G	A	Pts	PIM	GP	G	A	Pts	PIM
1997–98	CAC Canadians AAA	AMHL	22	13	10	23	19	—	—	—	—	—
1997–98	St. Albert Saints	AJHL	17	2	5	7	17	—	—	—	—	—
1997–98	Tri–City Americans	WHL	2	0	1	1	2	—	—	—	—	—
1998–99	Tri–City Americans	WHL	48	8	14	22	20	6	1	1	2	2
1999–2000	Tri–City Americans	WHL	72	24	36	60	38	4	0	0	0	2
2000–01	Tri–City Americans	WHL	72	36	44	80	72	—	—	—	—	—
2001–02	Tri–City Americans	WHL	69	44	59	103	73	5	1	2	3	5
2002–03	Albany River Rats	AHL	66	7	9	16	24	—	—	—	—	—
2003–04	Albany River Rats	AHL	63	7	19	26	32	—	—	—	—	—
2004–05	Albany River Rats	AHL	22	2	9	11	6	—	—	—	—	—
2004–05	Augusta Lynx	ECHL	42	15	21	36	36	—	—	—	—	—
2005–06	Mora IK	SEL	50	13	19	32	40	5	1	3	4	6
2006–07	Mora IK	SEL	40	8	12	20	12	4	1	0	1	4
2007–08	TPS	SM-liiga	8	2	1	3	0	—	—	—	—	—
2007–08	HV71	SEL	47	4	9	13	24	17	2	1	3	2
2008–09	Leksands IF	Allsv	45	22	30	52	43	10	1	0	1	2
2009–10	Leksands IF	Allsv	49	14	17	31	30	10	1	4	5	6
2010–11	SAPA Fehérvár AV19	AUT	38	20	27	47	18	—	—	—	—	—
2010–11	SAPA Fehérvár AV19	HUN	—	—	—	—	—	7	6	9	15	4
2011–12	SAPA Fehérvár AV19	AUT	21	6	15	21	2	6	2	3	5	2
2011–12	SAPA Fehérvár AV19	HUN	—	—	—	—	—	2	2	1	3	0
2012–13	SAPA Fehérvár AV19	AUT	41	6	23	29	14	—	—	—	—	—
2012–13	Västerås IK	Allsv	13	3	2	5	4	10	1	4	5	4
2013–14	Ritten Sport	ITA	38	16	34	50	8	17	7	10	17	10
2014–15	Ritten Sport	ITA	37	25	19	44	32	15	10	9	19	2
2015–16	SC Riessersee	DEL2	23	7	19	26	12	—	—	—	—	—
2016–17	Herning Blue Fox	DEN	4	0	1	1	4	—	—	—	—	—
2016–17	Gothiques d'Amiens	FRA	19	6	14	20	6	—	—	—	—	—
2017–18	HC Pustertal Wölfe	AlpsHL	31	8	18	26	16	—	—	—	—	—
AHL totals			151	16	37	53	62	—	—	—	—	—
SEL totals			137	25	40	65	76	26	4	4	8	12
AUT totals			100	32	65	97	34	6	2	3	5	2

== Awards ==
- Western Hockey League East Second All-Star Team 2002
- Swedish Champion with HV71 in 2008.
