= Chris Allen (ice hockey) =

Canadian ice hockey player (born 1978)

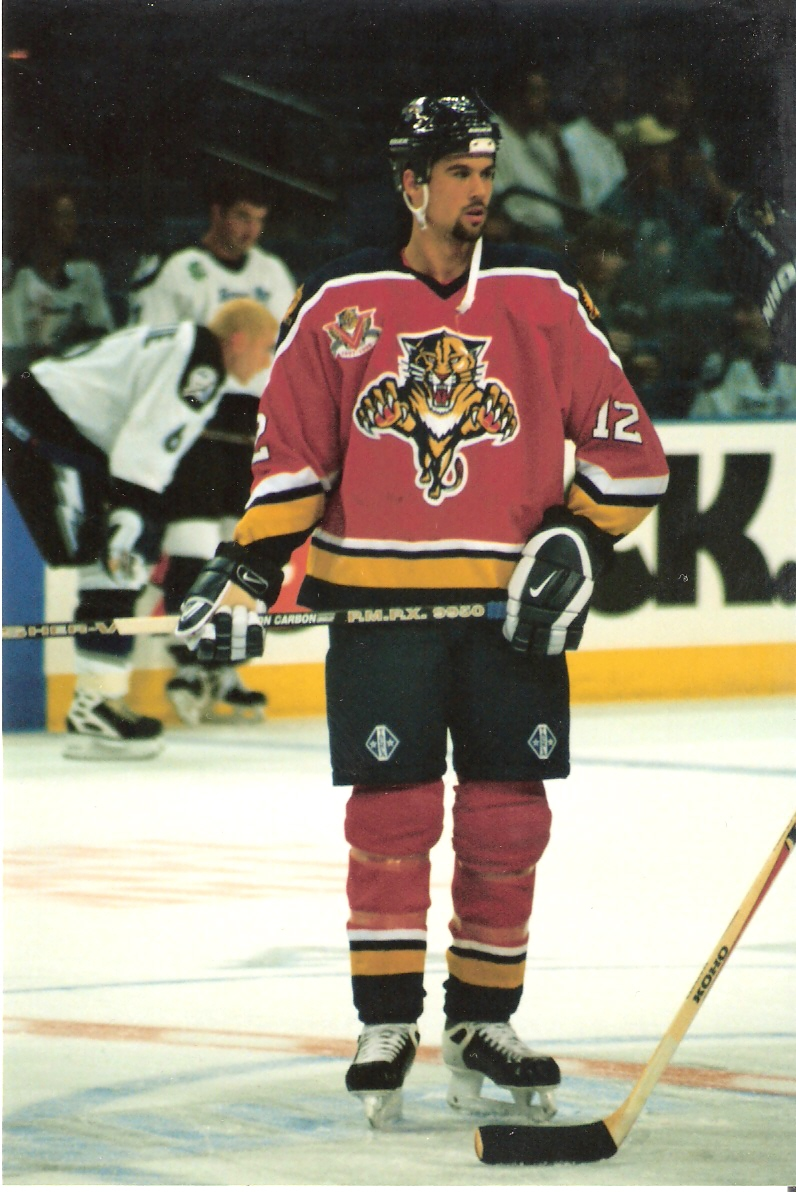
- Born: May 8, 1978 (age 47) Blenheim, Ontario, Canada
- Height: 6 ft 3 in (191 cm)
- Weight: 223 lb (101 kg; 15 st 13 lb)
- Position: Defence
- Shot: Right
- Played for: Florida Panthers; Vaasan Sport; Frisk Asker; Esbjerg EfB Ishockey; Alba Volán Székesfehérvár
- NHL draft: 60th overall, 1996; Florida Panthers
- Playing career: 1997–2014

Chris Allen (born May 8, 1978) is a Canadian former professional ice hockey defenceman who played two games in the National Hockey League (NHL) with the Florida Panthers.

== Playing career ==
While playing for the Kingston Frontenacs, Allen scored the first ever goal at the CHL Top Prospects Game in 1996. Playing for Team Cherry and held that year at Maple Leaf Gardens, the goal was assisted by the Drummondville Voltigeurs' Daniel Brière. Allen was drafted in the third round, 60th overall, by the Florida Panthers in the 1996 NHL entry draft and played two games in the National Hockey League (NHL) for the team. An injury sidetracked his career and he never again reached the NHL level. Allen has had his shot recorded at 103 miles per hour and picked up the OHL Defenceman Of The Year award in 1997–98. Chris is also tied for second all time in OHL goals for a defenceman with Bobby Orr and Al McInnis with 38 in 66 games as a member of the Kingston Frontenacs.

Allen has played 13 years professional, taking him all over the world. He has previously played in the NHL, the American Hockey League, ECHL, Europe (Finland, Norway, Denmark, Austria and Hungary, UK, Italy), and Asia (Korea, Japan, China).

== Personal ==
Allen was voted in the top 16 of Peta's 2008 Sexiest Vegetarian Next Door Contest, and was eventually named the winner.

== Career statistics ==
			Regular season					Playoffs
Season	Team	League	GP	G	A	Pts	PIM	GP	G	A	Pts	PIM
1992–93	Blenheim Blades	GLJHL	3	0	0	0	0	—	—	—	—	—
1993–94	Leamington Flyers	WOHL	52	6	20	26	38	—	—	—	—	—
1994–95	Kingston Frontenacs	OHL	43	3	5	8	15	2	0	0	0	0
1995–96	Kingston Frontenacs	OHL	55	21	17	38	58	6	0	2	2	8
1996–97	Kingston Frontenacs	OHL	61	14	29	43	81	5	1	2	3	4
1996–97	Carolina Monarchs	AHL	9	0	0	0	2	—	—	—	—	—
1997–98	Florida Panthers	NHL	1	0	0	0	2	—	—	—	—	—
1997–98	Kingston Frontenacs	OHL	66	38	60	98	91	10	4	2	6	6
1998–99	Florida Panthers	NHL	1	0	0	0	2	—	—	—	—	—
1998–99	Beast of New Haven	AHL	58	8	27	35	43	—	—	—	—	—
1999–2000	Port Huron Border Cats	UHL	6	2	1	3	4	—	—	—	—	—
1999–2000	Louisville Panthers	AHL	36	5	6	11	12	—	—	—	—	—
2000–01	Port Huron Border Cats	UHL	4	0	1	1	4	—	—	—	—	—
2000–01	Louisville Panthers	AHL	7	1	0	1	4	—	—	—	—	—
2001–02	B.C. Icemen	UHL	25	1	9	10	21	—	—	—	—	—
2002–03	Greensboro Generals	ECHL	51	6	8	14	58	—	—	—	—	—
2002–03	Mississippi Sea Wolves	ECHL	11	2	8	10	6	5	0	0	0	4
2003–04	South Carolina Stingrays	ECHL	68	13	25	38	44	1	0	1	1	0
2004–05	Sport	FIN.2	41	8	21	29	72	10	0	0	0	8
2005–06	Sport	FIN.2	29	3	4	7	49	6	1	0	1	12
2006–07	Frisk Tigers	NOR	36	9	15	24	107	7	1	0	1	8
2007–08	EfB Ishockey	DNK	8	2	1	3	4	—	—	—	—	—
2007–08	Alba Volán Székesfehérvár	AUT	25	4	5	9	38	—	—	—	—	—
2007–08	Alba Volán Székesfehérvár	HUN	2	0	0	0	6	9	0	2	2	20
2008–09	High1	ALH	35	6	12	18	54	2	0	0	0	4
2009–10	Edinburgh Capitals	EIHL	18	3	5	9	11	—	—	—	—	—
2009–10	Coventry Blaze	EIHL	10	1	1	2	0	—	—	—	—	—
2009–10	Utah Grizzlies	ECHL	3	0	0	0	0	—	—	—	—	—
2009–10	Bakersfield Condors	ECHL	16	2	2	4	14	—	—	—	—	—
2010–11	Telford Tigers	EPIHL	12	3	5	8	4	—	—	—	—	—
2010–11	Peterborough Phantoms	EPIHL	6	2	3	5	0	—	—	—	—	—
2010–11	HC Merano	ITA.2	—	—	—	—	—	6	0	0	0	6
2011–12	Peterborough Phantoms	EPIHL	49	13	38	51	36	2	0	1	1	0
2012–13	Solihull Barons	GBR.2	20	12	24	36	8	—	—	—	—	—
2013–14	Nottingham Lions	GBR.2	4	1	1	2	6	—	—	—	—	—
AHL totals			110	13	34	47	61	—	—	—	—	—
NHL totals			2	0	0	0	4	—	—	—	—	—
ECHL totals			149	23	43	66	122	6	0	1	1	4
