= Juha Alén =

Finnish ice hockey player (born 1981)

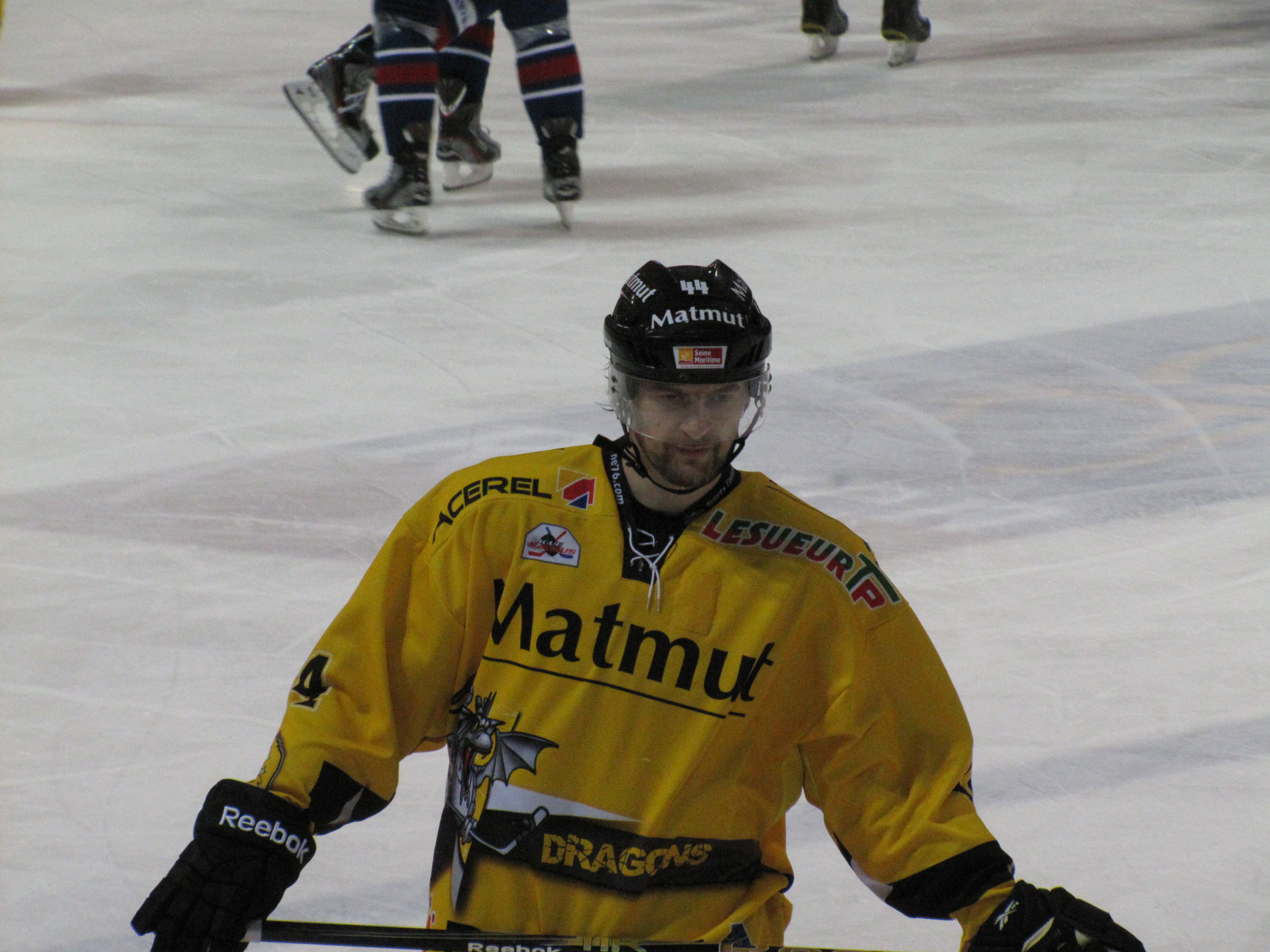
- image of Juha Alen during a match, was former ice hockey player.
- Born: October 25, 1981 (age 44) Tampere, Finland
- Height: 6 ft 3 in (191 cm)
- Weight: 203 lb (92 kg; 14 st 7 lb)
- Position: Defence
- Shot: Left
- Played for: Cincinnati Mighty Ducks; Ilves; Espoo Blues; Lukko; Mora IK; Alba Volán Székesfehérvár; Dragons de Rouen; HPK
- NHL draft: 90th overall, 2003; Mighty Ducks of Anaheim
- Playing career: 2003–2013

Juha Alén (born October 25, 1981) is a Finnish former professional ice hockey player. He played in the SM-liiga for Ilves, Espoo Blues Lukko and Lukko and also played in the American Hockey League for the Cincinnati Mighty Ducks, the Swedish HockeyAllsvenskan for Mora IK and the Austrian Hockey League for Hungarian side Alba Volán Székesfehérvár. He was drafted 90th overall by the Mighty Ducks of Anaheim in the 2003 NHL entry draft.

== Career statistics ==
| | | | Regular season | | | | | Playoffs |
| Season | Team | League | GP | G | A | Pts | PIM | GP | G | A | Pts | PIM |
|---|---|---|---|---|---|---|---|---|---|---|---|---|
| 1998–99 | KOOVEE | FIN.2 U20 | 36 | 6 | 7 | 13 | 42 | — | — | — | — | — |
| 1999–2000 | KOOVEE | FIN.2 U20 | 22 | 2 | 4 | 6 | 28 | — | — | — | — | — |
| 2000–01 | Ilves | FIN U20 | 42 | 2 | 12 | 14 | 62 | — | — | — | — | — |
| 2001–02 | Soo Indians | NAHL | 54 | 10 | 10 | 20 | 46 | 2 | 0 | 1 | 1 | 0 |
| 2002–03 | Northern Michigan University | CCHA | 40 | 4 | 9 | 13 | 64 | — | — | — | — | — |
| 2003–04 | Cincinnati Mighty Ducks | AHL | 59 | 2 | 3 | 5 | 64 | 9 | 0 | 0 | 0 | 14 |
| 2004–05 | Ilves | SM-l | 7 | 0 | 0 | 0 | 16 | 2 | 0 | 0 | 0 | 0 |
| 2005–06 | Ilves | SM-l | 52 | 5 | 5 | 10 | 104 | 4 | 0 | 0 | 0 | 6 |
| 2006–07 | Ilves | SM-l | 27 | 4 | 4 | 8 | 42 | — | — | — | — | — |
| 2006–07 | Blues | SM-l | 12 | 0 | 0 | 0 | 4 | — | — | — | — | — |
| 2007–08 | Lukko | SM-l | 49 | 2 | 1 | 3 | 56 | 3 | 0 | 0 | 0 | 6 |
| 2008–09 | Mora IK | Allsv | 42 | 0 | 7 | 7 | 108 | 3 | 0 | 1 | 1 | 10 |
| 2009–10 | SAPA Fehérvár AV19 | AUT | 49 | 6 | 5 | 11 | 48 | 5 | 0 | 0 | 0 | 22 |
| 2009–10 | SAPA Fehérvár AV19 | HUN | — | — | — | — | — | 5 | 0 | 1 | 1 | 2 |
| 2010–11 | Dragons de Rouen | FRA | 21 | 3 | 3 | 6 | 14 | 9 | 0 | 0 | 0 | 20 |
| 2011–12 | Dragons de Rouen | FRA | 20 | 2 | 2 | 4 | 39 | 14 | 1 | 0 | 1 | 28 |
| 2012–13 | HPK | SM-l | 9 | 0 | 0 | 0 | 14 | — | — | — | — | — |
| SM-l totals | | | 156 | 11 | 10 | 21 | 236 | 9 | 0 | 0 | 0 | 12 |
