= Derek Ryan (ice hockey) =

American ice hockey player (born 1986)

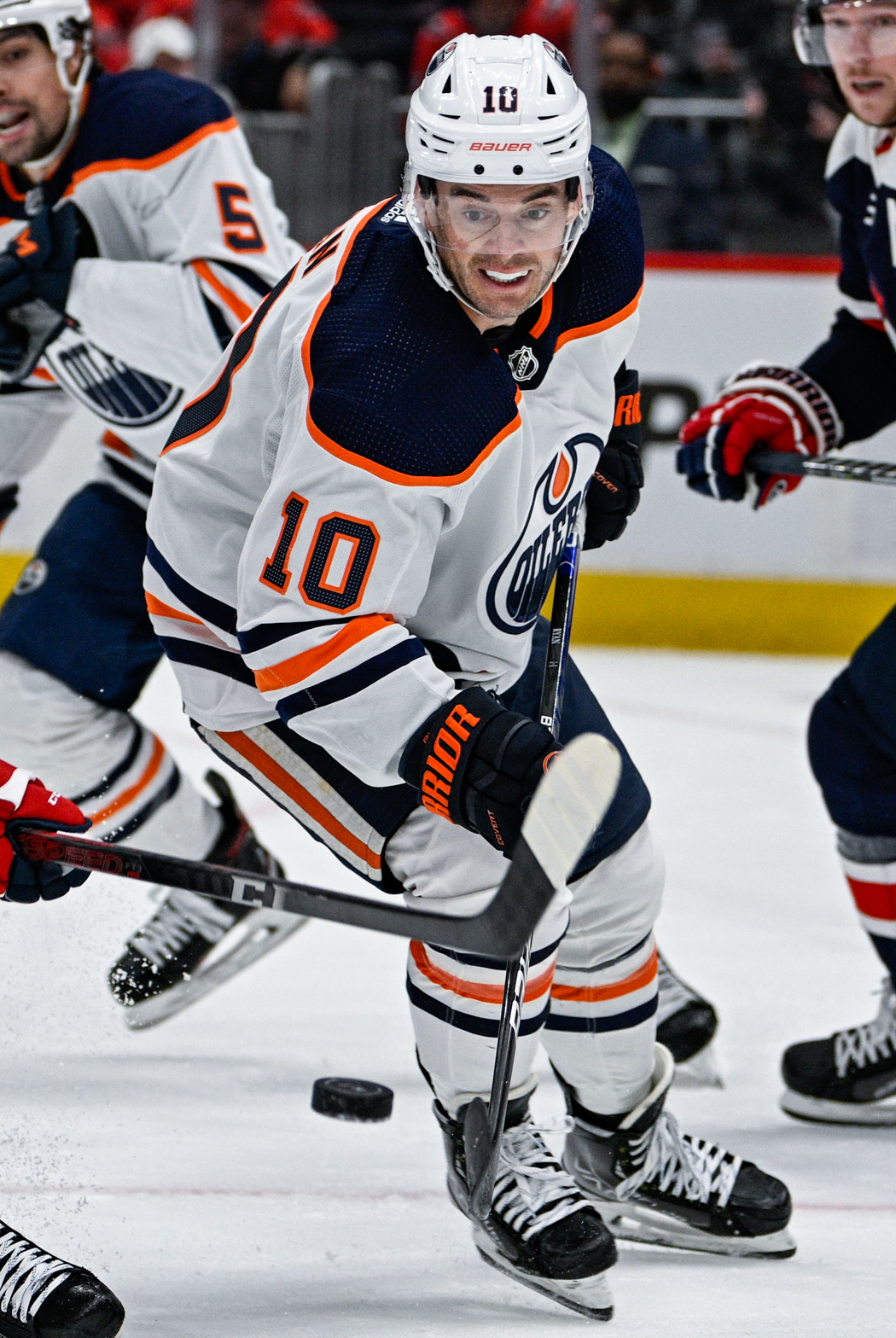
- Ryan with the Edmonton Oilers in 2022
- Born: December 29, 1986 (age 39) Spokane, Washington, U.S.
- Height: 5 ft 10 in (178 cm)
- Weight: 175 lb (79 kg; 12 st 7 lb)
- Position: Center / Right Wing
- Shot: Right
- Played for: SAPA Fehérvár AV19; EC VSV; Örebro HK; Carolina Hurricanes; Calgary Flames; Edmonton Oilers
- National team: United States
- NHL draft: Undrafted
- Playing career: 2007–2025

Derek Allen Ryan (born December 29, 1986) is an American former professional ice hockey player.

An undrafted player, Ryan played four successful seasons of Canadian university hockey and pursued a professional career in Europe before making his NHL debut at age 29. After being named the MVP of the Swedish Hockey League in 2015, Ryan signed his first NHL contract with the Carolina Hurricanes in June of that year. He played parts of three seasons with the Hurricanes before signing with the Calgary Flames in July 2018. He signed with the Oilers in 2021 and played for the team and its AHL affiliate, the Bakersfield Condors, until his retirement in 2025.

== Playing career ==
Ryan started his junior career with his hometown's Spokane Braves of the Kootenay International Junior Hockey League (KIJHL) from 2002 to 2004.

Ryan played four seasons of major junior hockey (2003–2007) in the Western Hockey League (WHL), again representing his hometown club, the Spokane Chiefs. With limited NHL interest due to his diminutive size, he went on to play four seasons of Canadian university hockey (2007–2011) with the University of Alberta Golden Bears in the CWUAA conference of Canadian Interuniversity Sport (CIS). For his outstanding college hockey play, he was named the CIS (West) Most Valuable Player for the 2010–11 season, and was also named to the 2010–11 CIS All-Canadian First Team.

Ryan embarked on a professional career in Europe and made his debut in the 2011–12 season in the Austrian League (EBEL) with Hungarian club Alba Volán Székesfehérvár under head coach Kevin Primeau. After placing third in team scoring with 49 points in 50 games, Ryan was signed to an improved contract with Austrian club EC VSV on July 7, 2012. In his second season in Villach, Ryan lead the EBEL with 38 goals and finished with 84 points in 54 games. He was awarded the Ron Kennedy Trophy as the league's most valuable player for the 2013–14 season.

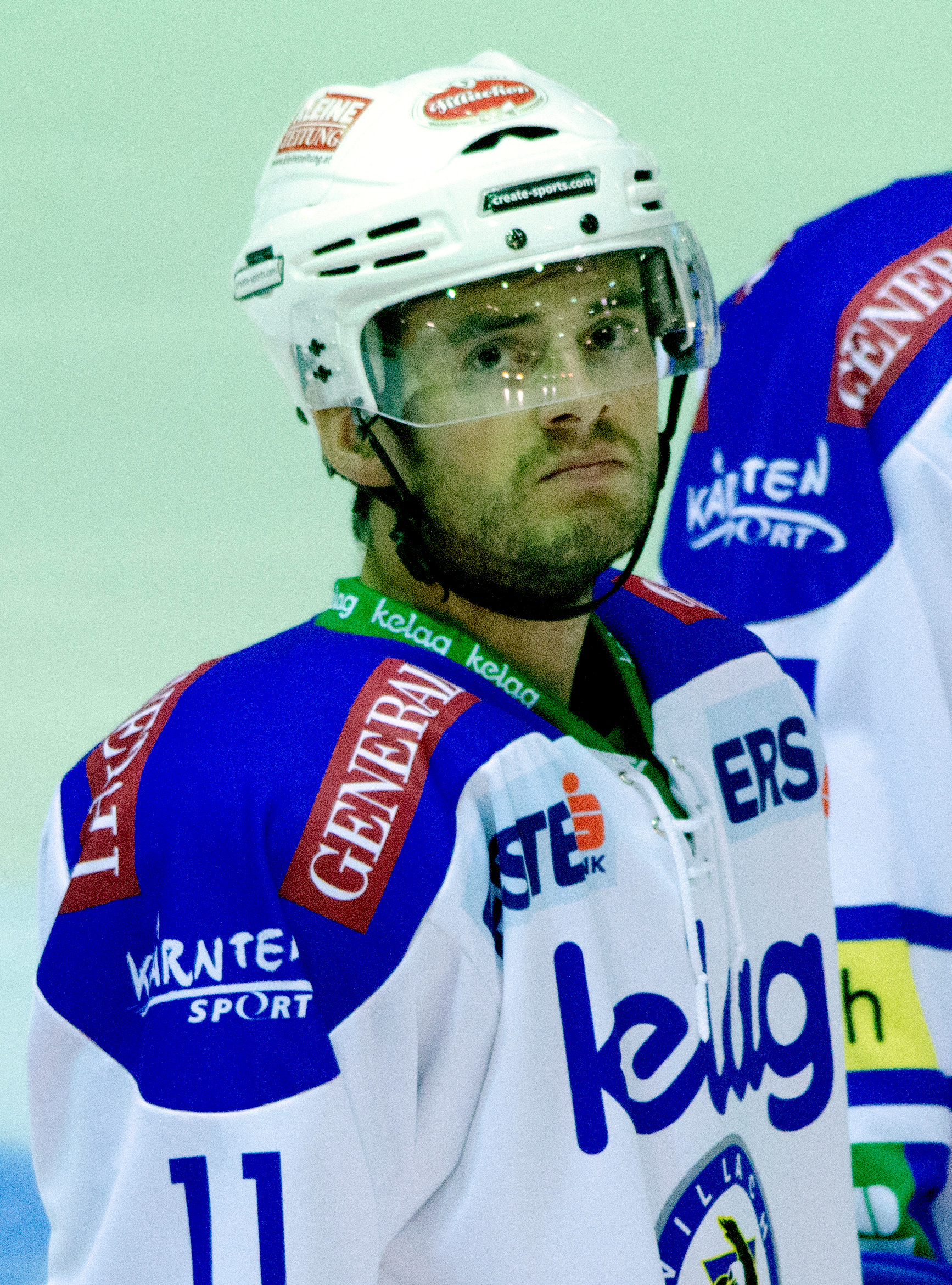
Ryan in 2013

On April 10, 2014, Ryan moved to the Swedish Hockey League (SHL), signing a lucrative contract with Örebro HK. In the 2014–15 season, Ryan's rapid ascent in the professional leagues continued as he became the cornerstone of Örebro's offence and in leading the club to the playoffs, lead the SHL in scoring with 45 assists and 60 points to be selected as the league's Forward of the Year and the SHL Most Valuable player.

=== Carolina Hurricanes and Calgary Flames ===
Earning NHL interest after defying initial size concerns, Ryan signed a one-year, two-way contract with the Carolina Hurricanes on June 15, 2015. He was called up to the Hurricanes in February 2016 and made his NHL debut on March 1 against the New Jersey Devils, also scoring his first NHL goal in the game, against goaltender Cory Schneider. Ryan played two full seasons with the Hurricanes, establishing himself as a versatile forward able to play both centre and wing and who could be counted on to play on both the powerplay and the penalty-killing units. Ryan also established himself as a more than reliable faceoff man; finishing with a faceoff percentage of 55.3% in the 2016–17 season, and 56.48% in the 2017–18 season.

Ryan left Carolina as a free agent to reunite with former Hurricanes head coach Bill Peters in signing a three-year, $9.375 million contract with the Calgary Flames on July 1, 2018. After a slow start to 2018–19 which saw him record only two goals in the season's first 20 games, Ryan managed to find chemistry with wingers Garnet Hathaway and Andrew Mangiapane, with the trio emerging as one of the key reasons for Calgary's first-place finish in the Western Conference. Ryan also finished a close 2nd place League wide in faceoff percentage with a percent of 58.2%, only 0.04% less than Jason Spezza. In the playoffs, Ryan recorded one goal in five games as the Flames lost to the Colorado Avalanche in the first round.

Firmly established as the Flames' third-line centre, Ryan continued his strong play into the 2019–20 season – albeit with two new wingers. Hathaway signed with the Washington Capitals in July 2019, with his vacated spot on Ryan's wing being filled by trade acquisition Milan Lucic. Lucic endured a similar dry spell to begin his Flames tenure as Ryan had a year previously; however, the two soon found chemistry on the third line and the second powerplay unit. With Mangiapane moving up to the second line to supplant a declining Michael Frolík, who was eventually traded to the Buffalo Sabres in January 2020, Ryan and Lucic were joined by rookie Dillon Dubé. Ryan scored 10 goals and 29 points in 68 games before the season was halted prematurely due to the COVID-19 pandemic.

=== Edmonton Oilers ===
Following the completion of his contract with the Flames, Ryan left the club as a free agent, opting to remain in Alberta by agreeing to a two-year, $2.5 million contract with rival club, the Edmonton Oilers on July 28, 2021. On February 26, 2022, Ryan scored his first NHL hat-trick in a 4–3 victory over the Florida Panthers. In July 2023, the Oilers extended Ryan's contract, signing him for a two-year, $1.8 million deal. On January 19, 2025, Ryan was placed on waivers for assignment with the rise of young forward Noah Philp. The next day, he cleared and was assigned to Edmonton's AHL affiliate, the Bakersfield Condors.

On September 5, 2025, Ryan announced his retirement from the NHL.

== Personal life ==
Ryan was raised in Spokane by his parents Nancy (who died during Ryan's second season with the Alberta Golden Bears) and Tim. He has one sister. He and his wife Bonnie have a son, born in 2013, and a daughter, born in 2016.

Ryan and his wife are members of the Church of Jesus Christ of Latter-day Saints.

== Career statistics ==
=== Regular season and playoffs ===
			Regular season					Playoffs
Season	Team	League	GP	G	A	Pts	PIM	GP	G	A	Pts	PIM
2002–03	Spokane Braves	KIJHL	49	26	29	55	24	6	3	5	8	0
2003–04	Spokane Braves	KIJHL	49	68	57	125	37	7	5	10	15	—
2003–04	Spokane Chiefs	WHL	1	1	0	1	0	4	1	0	1	0
2004–05	Spokane Chiefs	WHL	71	14	32	46	39	—	—	—	—	—
2005–06	Spokane Chiefs	WHL	72	24	37	61	50	—	—	—	—	—
2006–07	Spokane Chiefs	WHL	72	28	31	59	50	6	3	2	5	2
2006–07	Kalamazoo Wings	UHL	3	0	2	2	0	13	1	4	5	8
2007–08	University of Alberta	CIS	28	11	14	25	20	—	—	—	—	—
2008–09	University of Alberta	CIS	25	16	19	35	16	—	—	—	—	—
2009–10	University of Alberta	CIS	28	14	25	39	30	—	—	—	—	—
2010–11	University of Alberta	CIS	28	17	30	47	18	—	—	—	—	—
2011–12	Alba Volán Székesfehérvár	EBEL	50	25	24	49	20	6	1	3	4	6
2011–12	Alba Volán Székesfehérvár	HUN	—	—	—	—	—	5	3	7	10	2
2012–13	EC VSV	EBEL	54	27	39	66	22	7	3	8	11	6
2013–14	EC VSV	EBEL	54	38	46	84	50	9	2	14	16	6
2014–15	Örebro HK	SHL	55	15	45	60	18	6	0	1	1	2
2015–16	Charlotte Checkers	AHL	70	23	32	55	24	—	—	—	—	—
2015–16	Carolina Hurricanes	NHL	6	2	0	2	2	—	—	—	—	—
2016–17	Charlotte Checkers	AHL	9	5	8	13	0	—	—	—	—	—
2016–17	Carolina Hurricanes	NHL	67	11	18	29	22	—	—	—	—	—
2017–18	Carolina Hurricanes	NHL	80	15	23	38	28	—	—	—	—	—
2018–19	Calgary Flames	NHL	81	13	25	38	24	5	1	0	1	2
2019–20	Calgary Flames	NHL	68	10	19	29	10	10	0	2	2	0
2020–21	Calgary Flames	NHL	43	2	11	13	16	—	—	—	—	—
2021–22	Edmonton Oilers	NHL	75	10	12	22	8	15	1	2	3	4
2022–23	Edmonton Oilers	NHL	80	13	7	20	28	11	1	2	3	0
2023–24	Edmonton Oilers	NHL	70	5	7	12	8	19	0	1	1	8
2024–25	Edmonton Oilers	NHL	36	1	5	6	12	—	—	—	—	—
2024–25	Bakersfield Condors	AHL	13	3	5	8	2	—	—	—	—	—
NHL totals			606	82	127	209	158	60	3	7	10	14
SHL totals			55	15	45	60	18	6	0	1	1	2

Medal record

Representing United States

Ice hockey

World Championships
Bronze medal – third place	2018 Denmark	

=== International ===
Year	Team	Event	Result	GP	G	A	Pts	PIM
2018	United States	WC	3rd place, bronze medalist(s)	9	4	3	7	0
2019	United States	WC	7th	7	1	3	4	2
Senior totals				16	5	6	11	2

== Awards and honors ==
Award	Year
CIS
All-Canadian Second Team	2009–10
(West) Most Valuable Player	2010–11
First-Team All-Canadian	2010–11
SHL
Guldhjälmen Most Valuable Player	2014–15
