= Dániel Kóger =

Hungarian ice hockey player

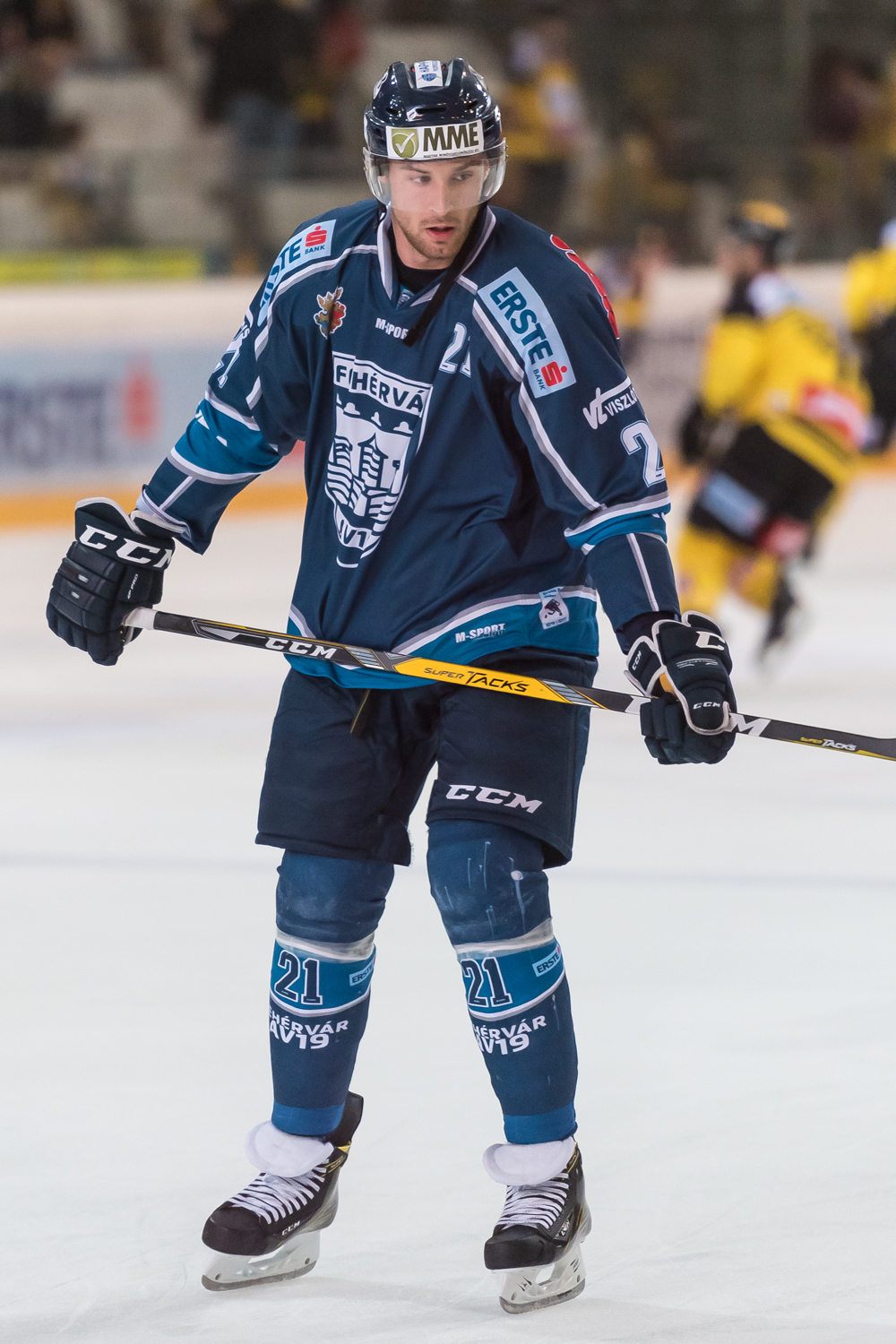
- Kóger in 2016
- Born: November 10, 1989 (age 35); Székesfehérvár, Hungary
- Height: 6 ft 2 in (188 cm)
- Weight: 195 lb (88 kg; 13 st 13 lb)
- Position: Right wing
- Shoots: Left
- EBEL team Former teams: Fehérvár AV19; Titánok Székesfehérvár; EC Red Bull Salzburg; St. John's IceCaps; Providence Bruins; Milwaukee Admirals; Hershey Bears
- National team: Hungary
- NHL draft: Undrafted
- Playing career: 2006–present

Dániel Kóger (born November 10, 1989) is a Hungarian professional ice hockey player. He is currently playing with Fehérvár AV19 in the Austrian Hockey League (EBEL).

== Playing career ==
After spending four years enduring a journeyman career in North American minor leagues, the American Hockey League and the ECHL, Kóger opted to make a return to Hungarian club, Alba Volán Székesfehérvár as a free agent, on a one-year contract on July 3, 2014.

Kóger competed at the 2009 Men's World Ice Hockey Championships as a member of the Hungary men's national ice hockey team.

Medal record

Representing Hungary

Ice hockey

IIHF World U18 Championship
Silver medal – second place	2007 Hungary	Division II Group A

World Junior Ice Hockey Championships
Gold medal – first place	2007 Romania	Division II Group A

World Ice Hockey Championships
Silver medal – second place	2010 Slovenia	Division I Group B
Silver medal – second place	2011 Hungary	Division I Group A

== Career statistics ==
=== Regular season and playoffs ===
			Regular season					Playoffs
Season	Team	League	GP	G	A	Pts	PIM	GP	G	A	Pts	PIM
2006–07	Titánok Székesfehérvár	HUN	34	7	11	18	10	—	—	—	—	—
2008–09	EC Red Bull Salzburg	EBEL	18	1	2	3	0	—	—	—	—	—
2009–10	Alba Volán Székesfehérvár	EBEL	40	7	9	16	20	5	0	0	0	8
2010–11	Laredo Bucks	CHL	64	29	23	52	40	—	—	—	—	—
2011–12	Cincinnati Cyclones	ECHL	22	5	15	20	31	—	—	—	—	—
2011–12	St. John's IceCaps	AHL	3	0	0	0	0	—	—	—	—	—
2011–12	Providence Bruins	AHL	5	0	0	0	2	—	—	—	—	—
2011–12	Milwaukee Admirals	AHL	6	0	1	1	0	—	—	—	—	—
2011–12	South Carolina Stingrays	ECHL	13	6	6	12	8	9	0	2	2	8
2011–12	Hershey Bears	AHL	3	0	1	1	0	—	—	—	—	—
2012–13	South Carolina Stingrays	ECHL	21	5	5	10	19	—	—	—	—	—
2012–13	Bakersfield Condors	ECHL	35	2	5	7	26	—	—	—	—	—
2012–13	Florida Everblades	ECHL	11	2	2	4	6	2	0	0	0	0
2013–14	Toledo Walleye	ECHL	17	4	5	9	15	—	—	—	—	—
2013–14	Elmira Jackals	ECHL	26	6	6	12	4	—	—	—	—	—
2014–15	Fehérvár AV19	EBEL	34	7	9	16	22	6	3	1	4	14
2015–16	Fehérvár AV19	EBEL	53	15	19	34	90	—	—	—	—	—
2016–17	Fehérvár AV19	EBEL	53	15	20	35	65	—	—	—	—	—
2017–18	Fehérvár AV19	EBEL	38	7	17	24	26	—	—	—	—	—
2018–19	Fehérvár AV19	EBEL	21	5	8	13	16	—	—	—	—	—
AHL totals			17	0	2	2	2	—	—	—	—	—
