= Ryan Bonni =

Canadian ice hockey player (born 1979)

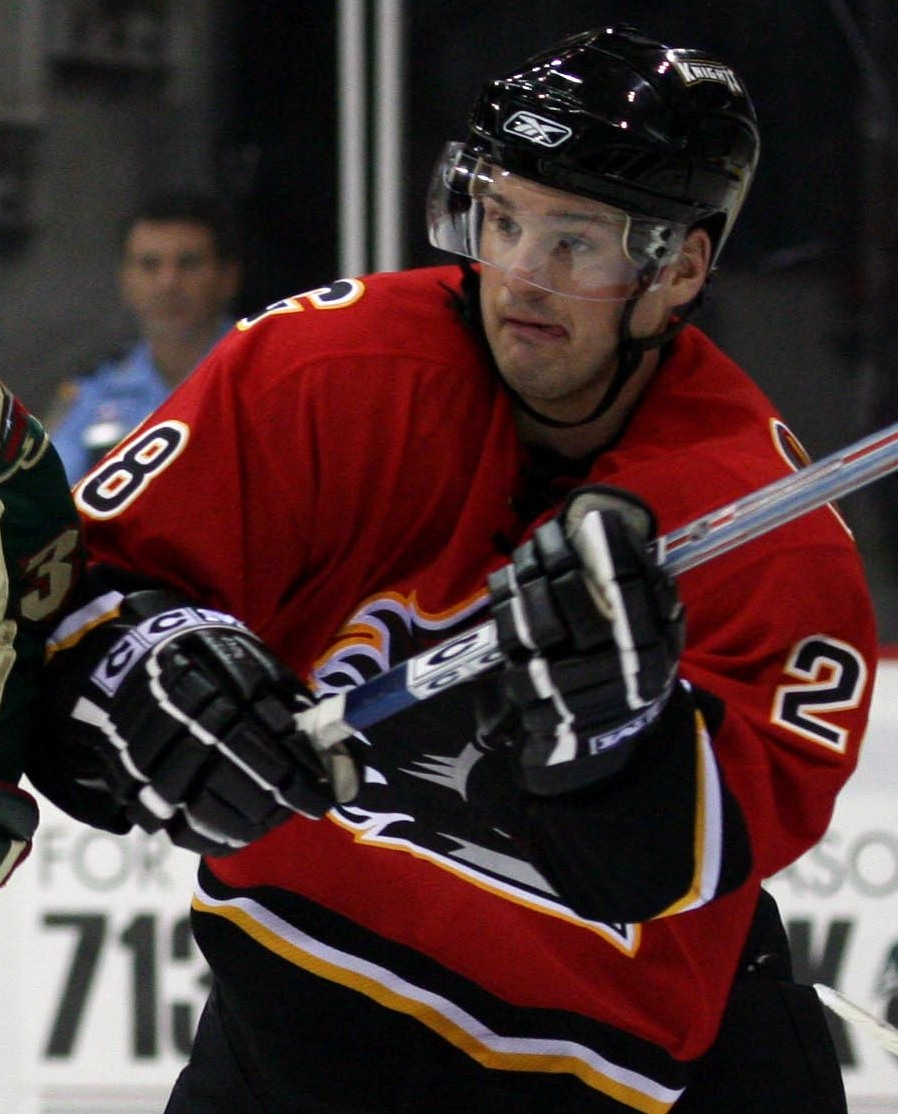
- Bonni with the Omaha Ak-Sar-Ben Knights in 2007
- Born: February 18, 1979 (age 47) Winnipeg, Manitoba, Canada
- Height: 6 ft 4 in (193 cm)
- Weight: 215 lb (98 kg; 15 st 5 lb)
- Position: Defence
- Shot: Left
- Played for: Vancouver Canucks; Landshut Cannibals; HKM Zvolen; SønderjyskE; Alba Volán Székesfehérvár; SG Pontebba
- NHL draft: 34th overall, 1997; Vancouver Canucks
- Playing career: 1999–2010

Ryan Bonni (born February 18, 1979) is a Canadian former professional ice hockey defenceman who played three games in the National Hockey League with the Vancouver Canucks. The majority of his career was spent in the minor leagues of North America, followed by several years in various European leagues.

== Playing career ==
Bonni was born in Winnipeg, Manitoba. A hard-nosed physical defender, Bonni was selected in the 2nd round (34th overall) of the 1997 NHL entry draft. He signed with the Canucks and turned pro in 1999, and had a solid first professional season with the Syracuse Crunch of the AHL, recording 18 points and 125 penalty minutes in 71 games, and earned a call-up to the NHL for the Canucks playing in three games during the 1999–2000 season.

However, he would struggle over the next two seasons, and by 2001–02 season he was demoted to the Columbia Inferno of the ECHL, Vancouver's secondary affiliate. Before the 2002–03 season, he was dealt to the Toronto Maple Leafs and spent a season in their minor-league system playing for the St. John's Maple Leafs. He has since played in various pro leagues and spent the 2007–08 season with Soenderjyske of the Danish Elite League.

Nearing the end of his professional career, he played for Alba Volan Szekesfehervar of the Austrian League in 2008–09 and joined in July 2009 to SG Pontebba.

== Post career ==
Following his playing career, he coached the River East Royal Knights of the MMJHL for 6 years and, as of 2016, is an assistant coach with the University of Manitoba Bisons.

== Career statistics ==
=== Regular season and playoffs ===
			Regular season					Playoffs
Season	Team	League	GP	G	A	Pts	PIM	GP	G	A	Pts	PIM
1994–95	Winnipeg Sharks	MMMHL	24	3	19	22	59	—	—	—	—	—
1995–96	Saskatoon Blades	WHL	63	1	7	8	78	3	0	0	0	0
1996–97	Saskatoon Blades	WHL	69	11	19	30	219	—	—	—	—	—
1997–98	Saskatoon Blades	WHL	42	5	14	19	100	—	—	—	—	—
1998–99	Saskatoon Blades	WHL	51	6	26	32	211	—	—	—	—	—
1998–99	Red Deer Rebels	WHL	20	3	10	13	41	9	0	4	4	25
1999–00	Vancouver Canucks	NHL	3	0	0	0	0	—	—	—	—	—
1999–00	Syracuse Crunch	AHL	71	5	13	18	125	2	0	1	1	2
2000–01	Kansas City Blades	IHL	80	2	9	11	127	—	—	—	—	—
2001–02	Manitoba Moose	AHL	11	0	1	1	33	2	0	0	0	2
2001–02	Columbia Inferno	ECHL	46	3	18	21	128	4	0	4	4	10
2002–03	St. John's Maple Leafs	AHL	61	1	8	9	86	—	—	—	—	—
2003–04	Greensboro Generals	ECHL	15	1	7	8	49	—	—	—	—	—
2003–04	Grand Rapids Griffins	AHL	54	1	6	7	98	4	0	0	0	8
2004–05	Landshut Cannibals	Ger-2	17	2	5	7	68	2	0	0	0	27
2004–05	Rockford IceHogs	UHL	23	3	5	8	41	—	—	—	—	—
2004–05	Milwaukee Admirals	AHL	5	0	1	1	11	—	—	—	—	—
2005–06	HKm Zvolen	SVK	24	3	2	5	69	4	0	1	1	0
2006–07	Las Vegas Wranglers	ECHL	46	4	29	33	80	10	1	2	3	16
2006–07	Omaha Ak-Sar-Ben Knights	AHL	16	0	0	0	19	—	—	—	—	—
2007–08	SønderjyskE	DNK	40	7	17	24	141	13	3	6	9	18
2008–09	Alba Volán Székesfehérvár	EBEL	34	1	9	10	93	—	—	—	—	—
2008–09	Alba Volán Székesfehérvár	HUN	—	—	—	—	—	8	1	2	3	10
2009–10	SG Pontebba	ITA	26	2	11	13	40	—	—	—	—	—
AHL totals			218	7	29	36	372	8	0	1	1	12
NHL totals			3	0	0	0	0	—	—	—	—	—
