= 1992–93 OB I bajnoksag season =

Hungarian ice hockey season

The 1992–93 OB I bajnokság season was the 56th season of the OB I bajnokság, the top level of ice hockey in Hungary. Seven teams participated in the league, and Ferencvarosi TC won the championship.

== Regular season ==
=== Final round ===
	Club	GP	W	T	L	Goals	Pts
1.	Ferencvárosi TC	24	19	4	1	206:75	42
2.	Lehel SE Jászberény	24	18	3	3	202:78	39
3.	Újpesti TE	24	15	2	7	176:105	32
4.	Alba Volán Székesfehérvár	24	8	1	15	121:136	17

=== 5th-7th place ===
	Club	GP	W	T	L	Goals	Pts
5.	Miskolci HC	22	7	0	15	124:184	14
6.	Nepstadion NSzE Budapest	22	6	0	16	91:181	12
7.	Debreceni AHC	22	3	0	19	102:263	6

== Playoffs ==
=== 3rd place ===
- Újpesti TE - Alba Volán Székesfehérvár 2:0 (5:4, 7:2)

=== Final ===
- Ferencvárosi TC - Lehel SE Jászberény 3:2 (4:1, 0:4, 1:4, 5:2, 4:3)
