= Jason Strudwick =

Canadian ice hockey defenceman

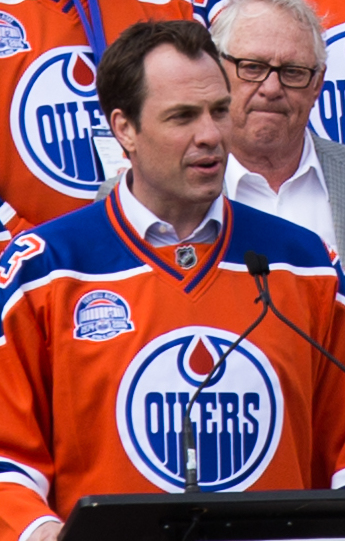
- Born: July 17, 1975 (age 51) Edmonton, Alberta, Canada
- Height: 6 ft 4 in (193 cm)
- Weight: 226 lb (103 kg; 16 st 2 lb)
- Position: Defense
- Shot: Left
- Played for: NHL; New York Islanders; Vancouver Canucks; Chicago Blackhawks; New York Rangers; Edmonton Oilers; AHL; Worcester IceCats; Syracuse Crunch; Kentucky Thoroughblades; HA; Södertälje SK; NLA; HC Lugano; OB I Ferencvárosi TC
- NHL draft: 63rd overall, 1994; New York Islanders
- Playing career: 1994–2012

Jason Wayne Strudwick (born July 17, 1975) is a Canadian former professional ice hockey defenceman and current broadcaster.

== Playing career ==
Strudwick was drafted in the third round, 63rd overall, by the New York Islanders in the 1994 NHL entry draft. He played his first National Hockey League (NHL) game with the Islanders against the Hartford Whalers on March 30, 1996.

On March 23, 1998, he was traded to the Vancouver Canucks in exchange for Gino Odjick. On July 15, 2002, he signed as a free agent with the Chicago Blackhawks.

After playing for the Hungarian team Ferencvárosi TC of OB I bajnokság during the 2004–05 NHL lockout, Strudwick returned to the NHL with the New York Rangers, the team with which he had previously signed as a free agent before the lockout on July 20, 2004, for the 2005–06 season.

Strudwick began the 2006–07 season with HC Lugano in Switzerland before signing a contract on March 19, 2007, with the Rangers. However, because he signed with the team after the trade deadline, he was not eligible to participate in the 2007 Stanley Cup playoffs. In July 2007, he signed a one-year contract with the Rangers and played with them through the 2007–08 season.

On July 10, 2008, Strudwick signed a one-year contract with the Edmonton Oilers for the 2008–09 season. He would re-sign with the Oilers during the summer of 2009. On July 2, 2010, he again re-signed as a free agent with the Oilers for another one-year contract. On November 21, 2011, Strudwick signed with the Swedish club Södertälje SK of the Swedish Allsvenskan. On May 24, 2012, he announced his retirement from professional hockey.

== Post-hockey career ==
After his retirement from the NHL, Strudwick hosted his own radio sports talk show, The Jason Strudwick Show, on Edmonton station TSN 1260, from 2012 to 2015. In May 2015, Strudwick moved to television, on Edmonton station City, where he hosted Dinner Television. The two-hour evening program featured newsmagazine and discussion segments. In May 2017, he returned to TSN as a co-host of the Jason Gregor Show.

He is now the co-host of the Got Yer Back podcast with Ryan Rishaug, and his feature segment is known as Struddy's World. This segment covers a variety of topics ranging from insider hockey insights to observational humour, with an introduction that includes his impersonation of Rodney Dangerfield.

== Personal life ==
Born and raised in Edmonton, Alberta, Strudwick was an honours student at Archbishop MacDonald High School. In July 2006, he married Schoena Johnson of Elk Mountain, Wyoming, whom he met when they both worked in Chicago. As of 2017, they have three children. Schoena is now a business owner in Edmonton.

Strudwick is a cousin of former NHLers Scott and Rob Niedermayer.

== Career statistics ==
=== Regular season and playoffs ===
| | | | Regular season | | | | | Playoffs |
| Season | Team | League | GP | G | A | Pts | PIM | GP | G | A | Pts | PIM |
|---|---|---|---|---|---|---|---|---|---|---|---|---|
| 1991–92 | Edmonton Legion AAA | AMHL | 35 | 3 | 8 | 11 | 67 | — | — | — | — | — |
| 1992–93 | Edmonton Pats AAA | AMHL | 35 | 8 | 20 | 28 | 135 | — | — | — | — | — |
| 1993–94 | Kamloops Blazers | WHL | 61 | 6 | 8 | 14 | 118 | 19 | 0 | 4 | 4 | 24 |
| 1994–95 | Kamloops Blazers | WHL | 72 | 3 | 11 | 14 | 183 | 21 | 1 | 1 | 2 | 39 |
| 1995–96 | Worcester IceCats | AHL | 60 | 2 | 7 | 9 | 119 | 4 | 0 | 1 | 1 | 0 |
| 1995–96 | New York Islanders | NHL | 1 | 0 | 0 | 0 | 7 | — | — | — | — | — |
| 1996–97 | Kentucky Thoroughblades | AHL | 80 | 1 | 9 | 10 | 198 | 4 | 0 | 0 | 0 | 0 |
| 1997–98 | Kentucky Thoroughblades | AHL | 39 | 3 | 1 | 4 | 87 | — | — | — | — | — |
| 1997–98 | New York Islanders | NHL | 17 | 0 | 1 | 1 | 36 | — | — | — | — | — |
| 1997–98 | Vancouver Canucks | NHL | 11 | 0 | 1 | 1 | 29 | — | — | — | — | — |
| 1997–98 | Syracuse Crunch | AHL | — | — | — | — | — | 3 | 0 | 0 | 0 | 6 |
| 1998–99 | Vancouver Canucks | NHL | 65 | 0 | 3 | 3 | 114 | — | — | — | — | — |
| 1999–00 | Vancouver Canucks | NHL | 63 | 1 | 3 | 4 | 64 | — | — | — | — | — |
| 2000–01 | Vancouver Canucks | NHL | 60 | 1 | 4 | 5 | 64 | 2 | 0 | 0 | 0 | 0 |
| 2001–02 | Vancouver Canucks | NHL | 44 | 2 | 4 | 6 | 96 | — | — | — | — | — |
| 2002–03 | Chicago Blackhawks | NHL | 48 | 2 | 3 | 5 | 87 | — | — | — | — | — |
| 2003–04 | Chicago Blackhawks | NHL | 54 | 1 | 3 | 4 | 73 | — | — | — | — | — |
| 2004–05 | Ferencvárosi TC | HUN | 6 | 1 | 2 | 3 | 8 | — | — | — | — | — |
| 2005–06 | New York Rangers | NHL | 65 | 3 | 4 | 7 | 66 | 3 | 0 | 0 | 0 | 0 |
| 2006–07 | HC Lugano | NLA | 34 | 2 | 3 | 5 | 28 | 6 | 0 | 0 | 0 | 4 |
| 2006–07 | New York Rangers | NHL | 8 | 0 | 0 | 0 | 2 | — | — | — | — | — |
| 2007–08 | New York Rangers | NHL | 52 | 1 | 1 | 2 | 40 | 2 | 0 | 0 | 0 | 0 |
| 2008–09 | Edmonton Oilers | NHL | 71 | 2 | 7 | 9 | 60 | — | — | — | — | — |
| 2009–10 | Edmonton Oilers | NHL | 72 | 0 | 6 | 6 | 50 | — | — | — | — | — |
| 2010–11 | Edmonton Oilers | NHL | 43 | 0 | 2 | 2 | 23 | — | — | — | — | — |
| 2011–12 | Södertälje SK | SWE-2 | 29 | 3 | 6 | 9 | 20 | — | — | — | — | — |
| NHL totals | | | 631 | 13 | 40 | 53 | 788 | 7 | 0 | 0 | 0 | 0 |

== See also ==
- List of family relations in the NHL
