= 1995–96 OB I bajnoksag season =

Hungarian ice hockey season

The 1995–96 OB I bajnokság season was the 59th season of the OB I bajnokság, the top level of ice hockey in Hungary. Five teams participated in the league, and Dunaferr Dunaujvaros won the championship.

== First round ==
	Club	GP	W	T	L	Goals	Pts
1.	Dunaferr Dunaújváros	12	10	2	0	78:17	22
2.	Lehel HC Jászberény	12	6	3	3	58:43	15
3.	Ferencvárosi TC	12	6	2	4	58:45	14
4.	Alba Volán Székesfehérvár	12	4	1	7	70:47	9
5.	Újpesti TE	12	0	0	12	23:135	0

== Second round ==
	Club	GP	W	T	L	Goals	Pts
1.	Dunaferr Dunaújváros	21	18	3	0	123:37	39
2.	Ferencvárosi TC	21	8	4	9	71:86	20
3.	Alba Volán Székesfehérvár	21	7	2	12	71:97	16
4.	Lehel HC Jászberény	21	3	3	15	69:114	9

== Playoffs ==
=== 3rd place ===
- Alba Volán Székesfehérvár - Lehel HC Jászberény 2:0 (4:3, 7:2)

=== Final ===
- Dunaferr Dunaújváros - Ferencvárosi TC 2:0 (4:1, 6:3)
