= 1991–92 OB I bajnoksag season =

Hungarian ice hockey season

The 55th season of the OB I bajnokság, the top level of ice hockey in Hungary, was played in 1991–92. Six teams participated in the league, and Ferencvarosi TC won the championship.

== Regular season ==
	Club	GP	W	T	L	Goals	Pts
1.	Ferencvárosi TC	25	21	0	4	236:73	42
2.	Újpesti TE	25	19	1	5	191:94	39
3.	Lehel SE Jászberény	25	18	0	7	158:71	36
4.	Alba Volán Székesfehérvár	25	9	2	14	107:154	20
5.	Miskolci HC	25	4	2	19	101:240	10
6.	Nepstadion NSzE Budapest	25	1	1	23	65:235	3

== Playoffs ==
=== 5th place ===
- Nepstadion NSzE Budapest - Miskolci HC 6:10

=== 3rd place ===
- Lehel SE Jászberény - Alba Volán Székesfehérvár 3:1

=== Final ===
- Ferencvárosi TC - Újpesti TE 4:3 OT
