= Peter Veselovský =

- Born: 11 November 1964 Liptovský Mikuláš, Czechoslovakia
- Died: 2 August 2025 (aged 60)
- Height: 6 ft 1 in (185 cm)
- Weight: 187 lb (85 kg; 13 st 5 lb)
- Position: Forward
- Shot: Left
- Played for: HC Košice; MHk 32 Liptovský Mikuláš; Drakkars de Caen; Dunaújvárosi Acélbikák; HK 36 Skalica; HK Spišská Nová Ves
- National team: Czechoslovakia
- Playing career: 1985–2003

Olympic medal record

Men's Ice hockey
Bronze medal – third place	1992 Albertville	Ice hockey

Peter Veselovský (11 November 1964 – 2 August 2025) was a Slovak professional ice hockey player.

== Biography ==
Peter Veselovský was born on 11 November 1964 in Liptovský Mikuláš. He started playing hockey in his hometown and already as a 17 years old he was a part of the A team. After mandatory military service, Veselovský had offers from multiple Slovak team. He opted for HC Košice for which he played for in the Czechoslovak Extraliga and the Slovak Extraliga from 1987 to 1996. With Košice, he won the federal championship in 1988 and two Slovak championships (1995 and 1996). He also played for MHk 32 Liptovský Mikuláš, Drakkars de Caen, Dunaújvárosi Acélbikák, HK 36 Skalica and HK Spišská Nová Ves.

He also played on the Olympic Bronze Medal winning ice hockey team for Czechoslovakia in 1992.

After retiring from ice hockey, he worked in the U. S. Steel Košice steel mill in Košice for 12 years.

== Death ==
Veselovský died on 2 August 2025, at the age of 60.

== Career statistics ==
=== Regular season and playoffs ===
			Regular season					Playoffs
Season	Team	League	GP	G	A	Pts	PIM	GP	G	A	Pts	PIM
1985–86	VTJ MEZ Michalovce	SVK II	—	30	14	44	—	—	—	—	—	—
1986–87	VTJ MEZ Michalovce	SVK II	—	20	26	46	—	—	—	—	—	—
1987–88	TJ VSŽ Košice	TCH	39	5	11	16	—	—	—	—	—	—
1988–89	TJ VSŽ Košice	TCH	42	16	16	32	59	—	—	—	—	—
1989–90	TJ VSŽ Košice	TCH	41	11	19	30	—	—	—	—	—	—
1990–91	HC VSŽ Košice	TCH	51	30	24	54	42	—	—	—	—	—
1991–92	HC VSŽ Košice	TCH	42	9	21	30	—	—	—	—	—	—
1992–93	HC Košice	TCH	39	5	22	27	—	—	—	—	—	—
1993–94	HC Košice	SVK	44	17	28	45	—	—	—	—	—	—
1994–95	HC Košice	SVK	44	7	22	29	—	—	—	—	—	—
1995–96	HC Košice	SVK	36	10	18	28	89	—	—	—	—	—
1996–97	HC Becherovka Karlovy Vary	CZE II	36	13	12	25	—	—	—	—	—	—
1997–98	HK 32 Liptovský Mikuláš	SVK	32	7	15	22	84	—	—	—	—	—
1998–99	Hockey Club de Caen	FRA	39	10	30	40	26	—	—	—	—	—
1999–2000	Dunaújvárosi Acélbikák	IEHL	15	2	7	9	8	—	—	—	—	—
1999–2000	Dunaújvárosi Acélbikák	HUN	6	5	8	13	2	—	—	—	—	—
2000–01	Dunaújvárosi Acélbikák	IEHL	18	9	15	24	14	—	—	—	—	—
2000–01	Dunaújvárosi Acélbikák	HUN	15	11	24	35	8	—	—	—	—	—
2002–03	HK 36 Skalica	SVK	8	0	2	2	6	—	—	—	—	—
2002–03	HK Spišská Nová Ves	SVK	17	5	10	15	32	—	—	—	—	—
TCH totals			254	76	113	189	—	—	—	—	—	—
SVK totals			181	46	95	141	—	—	—	—	—	—

=== International ===
Year	Team	Event	GP	G	A	Pts	PIM
1992	Czechoslovakia	OG	8	1	0	1	2
1992	Czechoslovakia	WC	3	0	0	0	25
Senior totals			11	1	0	1	27
