= 1985–86 OB I bajnoksag season =

Hungarian ice hockey season

The 1985–86 OB I bajnokság season was the 49th season of the OB I bajnokság, the top level of ice hockey in Hungary. Seven teams participated in the league, and Ujpesti Dozsa SC won the championship.

== First round ==
	Club	GP	W	T	L	Goals	Pts
1.	Újpesti Dózsa SC	12	11	1	0	131:28	23
2.	Ferencvárosi TC	12	9	0	3	83:37	18
3.	Alba Volán Székesfehérvár	12	8	1	3	88:53	17
4.	Dunaújvárosi Kohász	12	6	0	6	41:49	12
5.	Lehel Jászberény	12	4	0	8	51:76	8
6.	KSI Budapest	12	2	0	10	40:111	4
7.	Miskolci Kinizsi	12	1	0	11	43:123	2

== Second round ==
=== Final round ===
	Club	GP	W	T	L	Goals	Pts
1.	Újpesti Dózsa SC	20	17	2	1	180:48	36
2.	FFerencvárosi TC	20	13	1	6	110:72	26
3.	Alba Volán Székesfehérvár	20	8	3	9	113:99	19

=== 4th-7th place ===
	Club	GP	W	T	L	Goals	Pts
4.	Dunaújvárosi Kohász	18	10	1	7	80:60	21
5.	Lehel Jászberény	18	8	1	9	106:97	17
6.	KSI Budapest	18	5	0	13	75:146	10
7.	Miskolci Kinizsi	18	1	0	17	61:203	2
