= 1979–80 OB I bajnoksag season =

Hungarian ice hockey season

The 1979–80 OB I bajnokság season was the 43rd season of the OB I bajnokság, the top level of ice hockey in Hungary. Four teams participated in the league, and Ferencvarosi TC won the championship.

== Regular season ==
	Club	GP	W	T	L	Goals	Pts
1.	Ferencvárosi TC	18	16	1	1	128:53	33
2.	Újpesti Dózsa SC	18	9	0	9	95:74	18
3.	Alba Volán Székesfehérvár	18	5	1	13	64:94	11
4.	Budapesti Vasutas SC	18	4	2	12	55:121	10
