= 1983–84 OB I bajnoksag season =

Hungarian ice hockey season

The 1983–84 OB I bajnokság season was the 47th season of the OB I bajnokság, the top level of ice hockey in Hungary. Three teams participated in the league, and Ferencvarosi TC won the championship.

== Regular season ==
	Club	GP	W	T	L	Goals	Pts
1.	Ferencvárosi TC	16	9	0	7	79:77	18
2.	Újpesti Dózsa SC	16	8	0	8	85:67	16
3.	Alba Volán Székesfehérvár	16	7	0	9	62:82	14
