= 1984–85 OB I bajnoksag season =

Hungarian ice hockey season

The 1984–85 OB I bajnokság season was the 48th season of the OB I bajnokság, the top level of ice hockey in Hungary. Three teams participated in the league, and Ujpesti Dozsa SC won the championship.

== Regular season ==
| | Club | GP | W | T | L | Goals | Pts |
|---|---|---|---|---|---|---|---|
| 1. | Újpesti Dózsa SC | 16 | 14 | 0 | 2 | 106:55 | 28 |
| 2. | Ferencvárosi TC | 16 | 8 | 0 | 8 | 70:82 | 16 |
| 3. | Alba Volán Székesfehérvár | 16 | 2 | 0 | 14 | 54:93 | 4 |
