= 1988–89 OB I bajnoksag season =

Hungarian ice hockey season

The 1988–89 OB I bajnokság season was the 52nd season of the OB I bajnokság, the top level of ice hockey in Hungary. Seven teams participated in the league, and Ferencvarosi TC won the championship.

== First round ==
| | Club | GP | W | T | L | Goals | Pts |
|---|---|---|---|---|---|---|---|
| 1. | Újpesti Dózsa SC | 12 | 10 | 1 | 1 | 126:34 | 21 |
| 2. | Ferencvárosi TC | 12 | 9 | 1 | 2 | 98:40 | 19 |
| 3. | Alba Volán Székesfehérvár | 12 | 7 | 1 | 4 | 68:43 | 15 |
| 4. | Miskolci Kinizsi | 12 | 7 | 0 | 5 | 74:63 | 14 |
| 5. | Nepstadion NSzE Budapest | 12 | 3 | 1 | 8 | 47:90 | 7 |
| 6. | Lehel SE Jászberény | 12 | 3 | 0 | 9 | 34:84 | 6 |
| 7. | Sziketherm HC Dunaújváros | 12 | 1 | 0 | 11 | 42:135 | 2 |

== Second round ==
=== Final round ===
| | Club | GP | W | T | L | Goals | Pts |
|---|---|---|---|---|---|---|---|
| 1. | Újpesti Dózsa SC | 18 | 15 | 1 | 2 | 170:52 | 31 |
| 2. | Ferencvárosi TC | 18 | 14 | 1 | 3 | 133:57 | 29 |
| 3. | Alba Volán Székesfehérvár | 18 | 8 | 2 | 8 | 83:76 | 18 |
| 4. | Miskolci Kinizsi | 18 | 7 | 1 | 10 | 94:109 | 15 |

=== 5th-7th place ===
| | Club | GP | W | T | L | Goals | Pts |
|---|---|---|---|---|---|---|---|
| 5. | Nepstadion NSzE Budapest | 16 | 5 | 2 | 9 | 74:110 | 12 |
| 6. | Lehel SE Jászberény | 16 | 5 | 1 | 10 | 53:97 | 11 |
| 7. | Sziketherm HC Dunaújváros | 16 | 2 | 0 | 14 | 58:164 | 4 |

== Playoffs ==
=== 5th place ===
- Nepstadion NSzE Budapest - Lehel SE Jászberény 1:2 (7:3, 2:5, Forfeit win for Jászberény)

=== 3rd place ===
- Alba Volán Székesfehérvár - Miskolci Kinizsi 3:0 (6:5, 4:2, 4:2)

=== Final ===
- Újpesti Dózsa SC - Ferencvárosi TC 1:3 (5:2, 2:5, 6:7, 3:7)
