= 1982–83 OB I bajnoksag season =

Hungarian ice hockey season

The 1982–83 OB I bajnokság season was the 46th season of the OB I bajnokság, the top level of ice hockey in Hungary. Three teams participated in the league, and Ujpesti Dozsa SC won the championship.

== Regular season ==
	Club	GP	W	T	L	Goals	Pts
1.	Újpesti Dózsa SC	16	9	2	5	74:66	20
2.	Ferencvárosi TC	16	8	2	6	71:56	18
3.	Alba Volán Székesfehérvár	16	4	0	12	54:77	8
