= 1947–48 OB I bajnoksag season =

Hungarian ice hockey season

The 1947–48 OB I bajnokság season was the 11th season of the OB I bajnokság, the top level of ice hockey in Hungary. Six teams participated in the league, and MTK Budapest won the championship.

== Regular season ==
	Club	GP	W	T	L	Goals	Pts
1.	MTK Budapest	10	10	0	0	127:8	20
2.	Ferencvárosi TC	10	7	0	3	102:46	14
3.	Csepel Budapest	10	6	0	4		12
4.	BKE Budapest	10	4	0	6		8
5.	Budapesti Postás	10	2	0	8		4
6.	Szegedi Postás	10	1	0	9		2
