= 1994–95 OB I bajnoksag season =

Hungarian ice hockey season

The 1994–95 OB I bajnokság season was the 58th season of the OB I bajnokság, the top level of ice hockey in Hungary. Six teams participated in the league, and Ferencvarosi TC won the championship.

== Regular season ==
	Club	GP	W	T	L	Goals	Pts
1.	Ferencvárosi TC	20	13	3	4	131:74	29
2.	Alba Volán Székesfehérvár	20	13	1	6	117:74	27
3.	Lehel HC Jászberény	20	12	2	6	102:71	26
4.	Dunaferr Dunaújváros	20	10	4	6	114:62	24
5.	Újpesti TE	20	6	2	12	102:98	14
6.	MAC. N. Budapest	20	0	0	20	54:241	0

== Playoffs ==
=== 3rd place ===
- Lehel HC Jászberény - Dunaferr Dunaújváros 0:2 (3:4, 2:5)

=== Final ===
- Ferencvárosi TC - Alba Volán Székesfehérvár 2:1 (2:4, 3:2, 4:2)
