= 1997–98 OB I bajnoksag season =

Hungarian ice hockey season

The 1997–98 OB I bajnokság season was the 61st season of the OB I bajnokság, the top level of ice hockey in Hungary. Four teams participated in the league, and Dunaferr Dunaujvaros won the championship.

== Regular season ==
	Club	GP	W	T	L	Goals	Pts
1.	Dunaferr Dunaújváros	21	16	3	2	113:61	35
2.	Alba Volán Székesfehérvár	21	12	2	7	98:80	26
3.	Újpesti TE	21	7	1	13	72:95	15
4.	Ferencvárosi TC	21	3	2	16	54:98	8

== Final ==
- Dunaferr Dunaújváros - Alba Volán Székesfehérvár 3:1 (4:7, 4:1, 4:1, 4:3)
