= 1948–49 OB I bajnoksag season =

Hungarian ice hockey season

The 1948–49 OB I bajnokság season was the 12th season of the OB I bajnokság, the top level of ice hockey in Hungary. Five teams participated in the league, and MTK Budapest won the championship.

== Regular season ==
	Club	GP	W	T	L	Goals	Pts
1.	MTK Budapest	8	8	0	0	73:1	16
2.	Ferencvárosi TC	8	6	0	2	58:16	12
3.	BKE Budapest	8	4	0	4	22:40	8
4.	Meteor Mallerd	8	2	0	6		4
5.	Budapesti Postás	8	0	0	8		0
