= 1978–79 OB I bajnoksag season =

Hungarian ice hockey season

The 1978–79 OB I bajnokság season was the 42nd season of the OB I bajnokság, the top level of ice hockey in Hungary. Four teams participated in the league, and Ferencvarosi TC won the championship.

== Regular season ==
	Club	GP	W	T	L	Goals	Pts
1.	Ferencvárosi TC	18	12	3	3	97:45	27
2.	Újpesti Dózsa SC	18	11	4	3	94:65	26
3.	Alba Volán Székesfehérvár	18	5	3	10	68:96	13
4.	Budapesti Vasutas SC	18	3	0	15	49:102	6
