= 1986–87 OB I bajnoksag season =

Hungarian ice hockey season

The 1986–87 OB I bajnokság season was the 50th season of the OB I bajnokság, the top level of ice hockey in Hungary. Seven teams participated in the league, and Ujpesti Dozsa SC won the championship.

== First round ==
	Club	GP	W	T	L	Goals	Pts
1.	Újpesti Dózsa SC	12	12	0	0	113:31	24
2.	Ferencvárosi TC	12	10	0	2	87:38	20
3.	Alba Volán Székesfehérvár	12	8	0	4	61:43	16
4.	Miskolci Kinizsi	12	6	0	6	47:43	12
5.	Dunaújvárosi Kohász	12	2	1	9	35:72	5
6.	KSI Budapest	12	2	0	10	36:95	4
7.	Lehel Jászberény	12	1	1	10	32:89	3

== Second round ==
=== Final round ===
	Club	GP	W	T	L	Goals	Pts
1.	Újpesti Dózsa SC	24	23	1	0	95:38	47
2.	Ferencvárosi TC	24	16	1	7	48:43	33
3.	Alba Volán Székesfehérvár	24	14	0	10	63:51	28
4.	Miskolci Kinizsi	24	6	0	18	26:100	12

=== 5th-7th place ===
	Club	GP	W	T	L	Goals	Pts
5.	Lehel Jászberény	20	6	2	12	28:26	14
6.	Dunaújvárosi Kohász	20	5	2	13	25:30	12
7.	KSI Budapest	20	4	2	14	25:22	10
