= 1993–94 OB I bajnoksag season =

Hungarian ice hockey season

The 1993–94 OB I bajnokság season was the 57th season of the OB I bajnokság, the top level of ice hockey in Hungary. Seven teams participated in the league, and Ferencvarosi TC won the championship.

== Regular season ==
=== Final round ===
| | Club | GP | W | T | L | Goals | Pts |
|---|---|---|---|---|---|---|---|
| 1. | Alba Volán Székesfehérvár | 18 | 11 | 5 | 2 | 112:43 | 27 |
| 2. | Ferencvárosi TC | 18 | 12 | 2 | 4 | 102:62 | 26 |
| 3. | Újpesti TE | 18 | 8 | 3 | 7 | 82:82 | 19 |
| 4. | Dunaferr Dunaújváros | 18 | 8 | 2 | 8 | 91:57 | 18 |

=== Qualification round ===
| | Club | GP | W | T | L | Goals | Pts |
|---|---|---|---|---|---|---|---|
| 5. | Lehel HC Jászberény | 16 | 9 | 4 | 3 | 84:48 | 22 |
| 6. | MAC. Nepstadion Budapest | 16 | 2 | 1 | 13 | 50:146 | 5 |
| 7. | Debreceni AHC | 16 | 1 | 1 | 14 | 33:116 | 3 |

== Playoffs ==
=== 3rd place ===
- Újpesti TE - Dunaferr Dunaújváros 1:2 (4:3, 1:4, 1:3)

=== Final ===
- Alba Volán Székesfehérvár - Ferencvárosi TC 0:2 (2:6, 1:8)
