= 1981–82 OB I bajnoksag season =

Hungarian ice hockey season

The 1981–82 OB I bajnokság season was the 45th season of the OB I bajnokság, the top level of ice hockey in Hungary. Three teams participated in the league, and Ujpesti Dozsa SC won the championship.

== Regular season ==
	Club	GP	W	T	L	Goals	Pts
1.	Újpesti Dózsa SC	20	12	2	6	109:77	24
2.	Ferencvárosi TC	20	12	2	6	91:73	24
3.	Alba Volán Székesfehérvár	20	4	0	16	71:121	8
