= 1974–75 OB I bajnoksag season =

Hungarian ice hockey season

The 1974–75 OB I bajnokság season was the 38th season of the OB I bajnokság, the top level of ice hockey in Hungary. Four teams participated in the league, and Ferencvarosi TC won the championship.

== Regular season ==
	Club	GP	W	T	L	Goals	Pts
1.	Ferencvárosi TC	18	16	0	2	116:59	32
2.	Újpesti Dózsa SC	18	8	2	8	92:90	18
3.	Volán SC Budapest	18	7	1	10	73:94	15
4.	Budapesti Vasutas SC	18	3	1	14	58:96	7
