= 1971–72 OB I bajnoksag season =

Hungarian ice hockey season

The 1971–72 OB I bajnokság season was the 35th season of the OB I bajnokság, the top level of ice hockey in Hungary. Six teams participated in the league, and Ferencvarosi TC won the championship.

== Regular season ==
	Club	GP	W	T	L	Goals	Pts
1.	Ferencvárosi TC	20	18	1	1	214:44	37
2.	Újpesti Dózsa SC	20	15	1	4	151:67	31
3.	Budapesti Vasutas SC	20	11	1	8	89:73	23
4.	Volán SC Budapest	20	9	1	10	69:116	19
5.	Elõre Budapest	20	4	1	15	60:140	9
6.	KSI Budapest	20	0	1	19	28:171	1
