= 1936–37 OB I bajnoksag season =

Hungarian ice hockey season

The 1936–37 OB I bajnokság season was the first season of the OB I bajnokság, the top level of ice hockey in Hungary. Three teams participated in the league, and BKE Budapest won the championship.

== Regular season ==
	Club	Played	Won	Tied	Lost	Goals	Points
1.	BKE Budapest	2	2	0	0	20:3	4
2.	BBTE Budapest	2	1	0	1	7:3	2
3.	BKE Budapest II	2	0	0	2	4:25	0
