= 1972–73 OB I bajnoksag season =

Hungarian ice hockey season

The 1972–73 OB I bajnokság season was the 36th season of the OB I bajnokság, the top level of ice hockey in Hungary. Five teams participated in the league, and Ferencvarosi TC won the championship.

== Regular season ==
	Club	GP	W	T	L	Goals	Pts
1.	Ferencvárosi TC	20	19	1	0	186:61	39
2.	Újpesti Dózsa SC	20	11	2	7	123:77	24
3.	Budapesti Vasutas SC	20	8	3	9	91:99	19
4.	Volán SC Budapest	20	7	3	10	99:112	17
5.	Elõre Budapest	20	0	1	19	43:193	1
