= 1975–76 OB I bajnoksag season =

Hungarian ice hockey season

The 1975–76 OB I bajnokság season was the 39th season of the OB I bajnokság, the top level of ice hockey in Hungary. Four teams participated in the league, and Ferencvarosi TC won the championship.

== Regular season ==
	Club	GP	W	T	L	Goals	Pts
1.	Ferencvárosi TC	18	14	2	2	123:49	30
2.	Újpesti Dózsa SC	18	11	4	3	84:54	26
3.	Budapesti Vasutas SC	18	3	3	12	48:96	9
4.	Volán SC Budapest	18	3	1	14	54:110	7
