= 1970–71 OB I bajnoksag season =

Hungarian ice hockey season

The 1970–71 OB I bajnokság season was the 34th season of the OB I bajnokság, the top level of ice hockey in Hungary. Six teams participated in the league, and Ferencvarosi TC won the championship.

== Regular season ==
	Club	GP	W	T	L	Goals	Pts
1.	Ferencvárosi TC	20	18	1	1	167:52	37
2.	Újpesti Dózsa SC	20	15	2	3	164:56	32
3.	Budapesti Vasutas SC	20	12	2	6	100:49	26
4.	Volán SC Budapest	20	4	2	14	46:116	10
5.	Elõre Budapest	20	4	0	16	50:147	8
6.	Építõk Budapest	20	3	1	16	50:157	7
