= 1980–81 OB I bajnoksag season =

Hungarian ice hockey season

The 1980–81 OB I bajnokság season was the 44th season of the OB I bajnokság, the top level of ice hockey in Hungary. Three teams participated in the league, and Alba Volan Szekesfehervar won the championship.

== Regular season ==
	Club	GP	W	T	L	Goals	Pts
1.	Alba Volán Székesfehérvár	16	14	1	1	97:40	29
2.	Újpesti Dózsa SC	16	9	1	6	110:51	19
3.	Ferencvárosi TC	16	0	0	16	24:140	0
