= 1937–38 OB I bajnoksag season =

Hungarian ice hockey season

The 1937–38 OB I bajnokság season was the second season of the OB I bajnokság, the top level of ice hockey in Hungary. Five teams participated in the league, and BKE Budapest won the championship.

== Regular season ==
	Club	GP	W	T	L	Goals	Pts
1.	BKE Budapest	8	6	1	1	56:12	13
2.	BBTE Budapest	8	6	0	2	38:11	12
3.	Ferencvárosi TC	8	4	2	2	18:8	10
4.	BKE Budapest II	8	1	2	5	8:51	4
5.	Amateur HC	8	0	1	7	4:42	1
