= 1973–74 OB I bajnoksag season =

Hungarian ice hockey season

The 1973–74 OB I bajnokság season was the 37th season of the OB I bajnokság, the top level of ice hockey in Hungary. Four teams participated in the league, and Ferencvarosi TC won the championship.

== Regular season ==
	Club	GP	w	T	L	Goals	Pts
1.	Ferencvárosi TC	30	24	2	4	230:101	50
2.	Újpesti Dózsa SC	30	17	2	11	159:136	36
3.	Budapesti Vasutas SC	30	9	2	19	111:160	20
4.	Volán SC Budapest	30	7	0	23	103:206	14
