= Róbert Sárpátki =

Hungarian ice hockey player

Tamás Róbert Sárpátki
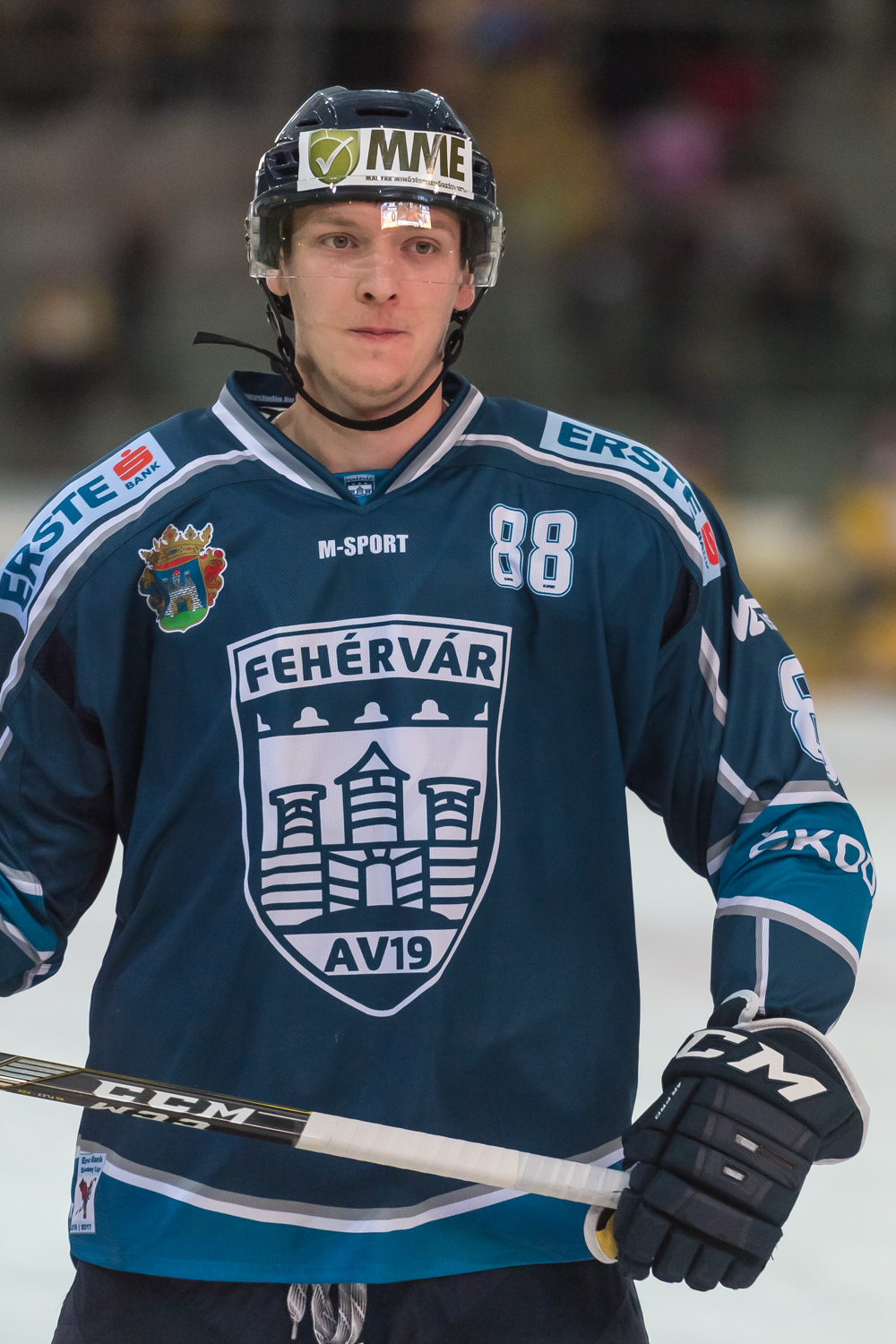
- Born: 28 December 1994 (age 30); Miercurea Ciuc, Romania
- Height: 195 cm (6 ft 5 in)
- Weight: 88 kg (194 lb; 13 st 12 lb)
- Position: Forward
- Shoots: Right
- Erste liga team: Gyergyói Hoki Club
- National team: Hungary
- Playing career: 2013–present

Tamás Róbert Sárpátki (born 28 December 1994) is a Hungarian professional ice hockey Forward who currently plays for Fehérvár AV19 in the Austrian Hockey League (EBEL).
