= 1998–99 OB I bajnoksag season =

Hungarian ice hockey season

The 1998–99 OB I bajnokság season was the 62nd season of the OB I bajnokság, the top level of ice hockey in Hungary. Four teams participated in the league, and Alba Volan Szekesfehervar won the championship.

== Regular season ==
	Club	GP	W	T	L	Goals	Pts
1.	Alba Volán Székesfehérvár	30	19	4	7	149:99	42
2.	Dunaferr Dunaújváros	30	20	2	8	131:78	42
3.	Ferencvárosi TC	30	9	4	17	115:141	22
4.	Újpesti TE	30	6	2	22	90:167	14

== Playoffs ==
=== 3rd place ===
- Újpesti TE - Ferencvárosi TC 0:2 (2:4, 4:12)

=== Final ===
- Alba Volán Székesfehérvár - Dunaferr Dunaújváros 4:2 (3:2, 2:3, 2:3, 6:4, 3:1, 5:4 OT)
