= 1939–40 OB I bajnoksag season =

Hungarian ice hockey season

The 1939–40 OB I bajnokság season was the fourth season of the OB I bajnokság, the top level of ice hockey in Hungary. Three teams participated in the league, and BKE Budapest won the championship.

== Regular season ==
| | Club | GP | W | T | L | Goals | Pts |
|---|---|---|---|---|---|---|---|
| 1. | BKE Budapest | 4 | 3 | 0 | 1 | 18:5 | 6 |
| 2. | BBTE Budapest | 4 | 3 | 0 | 1 | 9:6 | 6 |
| 3. | Ferencvárosi TC | 4 | 0 | 0 | 4 | 0:16 | 0 |
