= 1941–42 OB I bajnoksag season =

Hungarian ice hockey season

The 1941–42 OB I bajnokság season was the sixth season of the OB I bajnokság, the top level of ice hockey in Hungary. The top two teams out of the Budapest Group and the Erdely group qualified for the final round. BKE Budapest won the championship.

== Regular season ==
=== Budapest Group ===
	Club	GP	W	T	L	Goals	Pts
1.	BBTE Budapest	4	2	0	2	12:9	4
2.	BKE Budapest	4	2	0	2	11:9	4
3.	Ferencvárosi TC	4	2	0	2	10:15	4

=== Erdély Group ===
	Club
1.	Csíkszeredai TE
2.	Kolozsvári KE

== Final round ==
=== Semifinals ===
- BBTE Budapest - Csíkszeredai TE 11:0
- BKE Budapest - Kolozsvári KE 4:0

=== 3rd place ===
- Kolozsvári KE - Csíkszeredai TE 2:1 n.V.

=== Final ===
- BKE Budapest - BBTE Budapest 4:0
