= 1976–77 OB I bajnoksag season =

Hungarian ice hockey season

The 1976–77 OB I bajnokság season was the 40th season of the OB I bajnokság, the top level of ice hockey in Hungary. Four teams participated in the league, and Ferencvarosi TC won the championship.

== Regular season ==
	Club	GP	W	T	L	Goals	Pts
1.	Ferencvárosi TC	12	8	2	2	73:43	18
2.	Újpesti Dózsa SC	12	6	5	1	64:39	17
3.	Budapesti Vasutas SC	12	3	1	8	34:58	7
4.	Volán SC Budapest	12	2	2	8	42:73	6
