= 1952–53 OB I bajnoksag season =

Hungarian ice hockey season

The 1952–53 OB I bajnokság season was the 16th season of the OB I bajnokság, the top level of ice hockey in Hungary. Nine teams participated in the league, and Postas Budapest won the championship.

== Regular season ==
	Club	GP	W	T	L	Goals	Pts
1.	Postás Budapest	16	14	2	0	166:18	30
2.	Kinizsi SE Budapest	16	13	0	3	180:32	26
3.	Vörös Meteor Budapest	16	12	2	2	137:17	26
4.	Építõk Metro Budapest	16	8	3	5	74:39	19
5.	Postás Keleti	16	6	5	5	84:68	17
6.	Szikra Budapest	16	6	1	9	66:104	13
7.	VM Vendéglátó	16	4	0	12	32:139	8
8.	Soproni Lokomotiv	16	1	1	14	18:172	3
9.	Betonútépítõk Budapest	16	1	0	15	15:183	2

=== 2nd place game ===
- Kinizsi SE Budapest - Vörös Meteor Budapest 5:3
