= 1938–39 OB I bajnoksag season =

Hungarian ice hockey season

The 1938–39 OB I bajnokság season was the third season of the OB I bajnokság, the top level of ice hockey in Hungary. Three teams participated in the league, and BKE Budapest won the championship.

== Regular season ==
	Club	GP	W	T	L	Goals	Pts
1.	BKE Budapest	4	3	0	1	9:4	6
2.	BBTE Budapest	4	3	0	1	7:4	6
3.	Ferencvárosi TC	4	0	0	4	1:9	0
