= 1945–46 OB I bajnoksag season =

Hungarian ice hockey season

The 1945–46 OB I bajnokság season was the ninth season of the OB I bajnokság, the top level of ice hockey in Hungary. 10 teams participated in the league, and BKE Budapest won the championship.

== First round ==
=== Group A ===
	Club	GP	W	T	L	Goals	Pts
1.	Ferencvárosi TC	4	4	0	0	60:0	8
2.	BKE Budapest II	4	3	0	1	77:4	6
3.	MADISZ Dózsa	4	1	1	2	2:51	3
4.	Rendor Egylet	4	0	2	2	1:65	2
5.	MHC Budapest	4	0	1	3	0:20	1

=== Group B ===
	Club	GP	W	T	L	Goals	Pts
1.	BKE Budapest	4	4	0	0	92:1	8
2.	Ferencvárosi TC II	4	3	0	1	16:14	6
3.	Budapesti Postás	4	2	0	2	12:24	4
4.	Csepel Budapest	4	1	0	3	15:28	2
5.	KASE Budapest	4	0	0	4	0:68	0

== Second round ==
=== Final round ===
	Club	GP	W	T	L	Goals	Pts
1.	BKE Budapest	3	3	0	0	28:8	6
2.	Ferencvárosi TC	3	2	0	1	16:9	4
3.	BKE Budapest II	3	1	0	2	10:15	2
4.	Ferencvárosi TC II	3	0	0	3	5:27	0

=== 5th place ===
	Club
5.	Budapesti Postás
6.	Csepel Budapest
7.	MADISZ Dózsa
8.	Rendor Egylet
9.	MHC Budapest
10.	KASE Budapest
