= 1943–44 OB I bajnoksag season =

Ice hockey tournament in Hungary

The 1943–44 OB I bajnokság season was the eighth season of the OB I bajnokság, the top level of ice hockey in Hungary. Five teams participated in the final round of the league, and BKE Budapest won the championship.

== Regular season ==
=== Budapest Group ===
	Club	GP	W	T	L	Goals	Pts
1.	BBTE Budapest	6	5	0	1	28:6	10
2.	BKE Budapest	5	4	0	1	36:4	8
3.	Ferencvárosi TC	6	1	1	4	9:21	3
4.	BEAC Budapest	5	0	1	5	4:46	1

=== South Group ===
	Club
1.	Szegedi KE
2.	Orosházi TKE
3.	Ó. Bocskai
4.	Palicsi SK

=== Kassa Group ===
- Kassai VSC qualified for final round.

=== Erdély Group ===
	Club	GP	W	T	L	Goals	Pts
1.	Csíkszeredai TE	2	1	1	0	6:4	3
2.	Marosvásárhelyi SE	2	1	0	1	8:7	2
3.	Kolozsvári KE	2	0	1	1	1:4	1

== Final round ==
	Club	GP	W	T	L	Goals	Pts
1.	BKE Budapest	4	4	0	0	8:2	8
2.	Marosvásárhelyi SE	3	1	1	1	3:3	3
3.	BBTE Budapest	4	1	1	2	3:3	3
4.	Kassai VSC	4	0	3	1	2:4	3
5.	Csíkszeredai TE	3	0	1	2	4:8	1
