= 1977–78 OB I bajnoksag season =

Hungarian ice hockey season

The 1977–78 OB I bajnokság season was the 41st season of the OB I bajnokság, the top level of ice hockey in Hungary. Four teams participated in the league, and Ferencvarosi TC won the championship.

== Regular season ==
	Club	GP	W	T	L	Goals	Pts
1.	Ferencvárosi TC	18	14	2	2	107:58	30
2.	Újpesti Dózsa SC	18	10	3	5	84:65	23
3.	Alba Volán Székesfehérvár	18	6	3	9	71:101	15
4.	Budapesti Vasutas SC	18	2	0	16	49:87	4

== Playoffs ==
=== 3rd place ===
- Alba Volán Székesfehérvár - Budapesti Vasutas SC 1:2 (3:4, 8:5, 3:5)

=== Final ===
- Ferencvárosi TC - Újpesti Dózsa SC 2:1 (6:3, 3:4, 6:3)
