= 2003–04 OB I bajnoksag season =

Hungarian ice hockey season

The 2003–04 OB I bajnokság season was the 67th season of the OB I bajnokság, the top level of ice hockey in Hungary. Six teams participated in the league, and Alba Volan Szekesfehervar won the championship.

== First round ==
	Club	GP	W	OTW	OTL	L	Goals	Pts
1.	Alba Volán Székesfehérvár	10	9	0	1	0	62:20	28
2.	Dunaújvárosi AC	10	7	2	0	1	87:19	25
3.	Ferencvárosi TC	10	6	0	1	3	60:36	19
4.	Újpesti TE	10	4	0	0	6	37:59	12
5.	Miskolci Jegesmedvék	10	1	0	0	9	27:77	3
6.	Gyori HC	10	1	0	0	9	21:83	3

== Second round ==
=== Group I ===
	Club	GP	W	OTW	OTL	L	Goals	Pts
1.	Alba Volán Székesfehérvár	8	7	0	1	0	38:14	22
2.	Dunaújvárosi AC	8	3	2	0	3	33:32	13
3.	Ferencvárosi TC	8	0	0	1	7	22:47	1

=== Group II ===
	Club	GP	W	OTW	OTL	L	Goals	Pts
4.	Újpesti TE	8	8	0	0	0	54:28	24
5.	Gyori HC	8	3	0	0	5	27:41	9
6.	Miskolci Jegesmedvék	8	1	0	0	7	29:41	3

== Playoffs ==
=== 3rd place ===
- Ferencvárosi TC - Újpesti TE 2:0 (7:2, 5:3)

=== Final ===
- Alba Volán Székesfehérvár - Dunaújvárosi AC 4:1 (3:1, 1:0, 2:3 SO, 6:0, 3:2 SO)
