= 2008–09 OB I bajnoksag season =

Hungarian ice hockey season

The 2008–09 OB I bajnokság season was the 72nd season of the OB I bajnokság, the top level of ice hockey in Hungary. Six teams participated in the league, and Alba Volan Szekesfehervar won the championship.

== First round ==
Rank	Team	GP	W	OTW	OTL	L	Goals	Pts
1.	Újpesti TE	20	17	0	1	2	99:43	52
2.	Budapest Stars	20	14	2	0	4	81:38	46
3.	Dunaújvárosi Acélbikák	20	12	1	2	5	90:58	40
4.	Ferencvárosi TC	20	7	0	1	12	53:80	22
5.	Miskolci Jegesmedvék Jégkorong Sportegyesület	20	3	1	1	15	36:92	12
6.	Alba Volán Székesfehérvár II	20	2	1	0	17	48:96	8

== Second round ==
Rank	Team	GP	W	OTW	OTL	L	Goals	Pts
1.	Újpesti TE	10	6	1	1	2	49:30	30 (9)
2.	Budapest Stars	10	6	1	0	3	40:29	26 (6)
3.	Dunaújvárosi Acélbikák	10	7	0	1	2	52:28	25 (3)
4.	Ferencvárosi TC	10	4	1	2	3	30:35	16
5.	Miskolci Jegesmedvék Jégkorong Sportegyesület	10	3	1	0	6	33:43	11
6.	Alba Volán Székesfehérvár II	10	0	0	0	10	23:62	0

== Playoffs ==
=== Pre-Playoffs ===
- Ujpesti TE - Alba Volan Szekesfehervar II 8–3, 4–0
- Budapest Stars - Miskolci JJSE 5–4, 3–2
- Dunaujvarosi Acelbikak - Ferencvarosi TC 6–2, 5–8, 6–2

=== Semifinals ===
- Ujpesti TE - Budapest Stars 3–0 on series
- Alba Volan Szekesfhervar - Dunaujvarosi Acelbikak 3–0 on series

=== Final ===
- Alba Volan Szekesfehervar - Ujpesti TE 4–1 on series

=== 3rd place ===
- Dunaujvarosi Acelbikak - Budapest Stars 3–0 on series

== 5th-7th place ==
Rank	Team	GP	W	OTW	OTL	L	Goals	Pts
5.	Miskolci Jegesmedvék Jégkorong Sportegyesület	4	3	0	0	1	21:12	9
6.	Ferencvárosi TC	4	3	0	0	1	19:13	9
7.	Alba Volán Székesfehérvár II	4	0	0	0	4	5:20	0
