= 2000–01 OB I bajnoksag season =

Hungarian ice hockey season

The 2000–01 OB I bajnokság season was the 64th season of the OB I bajnokság, the top level of ice hockey in Hungary. Eight teams participated in the league, and Alba Volan Szekesfehervar won the championship.

== First round ==
	Club	GP	W	T	L	Goals	Pts
1.	Dunaferr SE Dunaújváros	14	13	1	0	142:5	27
2.	Alba Volán Székesfehérvár	14	12	1	1	140:18	25
3.	Ferencvárosi TC	14	8	1	5	83:53	17
4.	Újpesti TE	14	6	3	5	50:60	15
5.	Györi HC	14	6	1	7	52:62	13
6.	MAC-Nepstadion Budapest	14	4	1	9	34:122	9
7.	Miskolci JJE	14	1	1	12	33:119	3
8.	Tisza Volán HC Szeged	14	1	1	12	27:122	3

== Second round ==
=== Group A ===
	Club	GP	W	T	L	Goals	Pts
1.	Dunaferr SE Dunaújváros	8	6	1	1	48:17	13
2.	Alba Volán Székesfehérvár	8	4	1	3	36:25	9
3.	Ferencvárosi TC	8	1	0	7	18:60	2

=== Group B ===
	Club	GP	W	T	L	Goals	Pts
4.	Újpesti TE	8	5	2	1	42:22	12
5.	Györi HC	8	4	1	3	44:37	9
6.	MAC-Nepstadion Budapest	8	1	1	6	24:51	3

== Playoffs ==
=== 7th place ===
- Miskolci JJE - Tisza Volán HC Szeged 2:1 (4:5, 7:1, 5:0 Forfeit)

=== 3rd place ===
- Ferencvárosi TC - Újpesti TE 7:4

=== Final ===
- Dunaferr SE Dunaújváros - Alba Volán Székesfehérvár 1:4 (2:1 SO, 2:5, 2:6, 1:3, 3:5)
