= 2010–11 OB I bajnoksag season =

Hungarian ice hockey season

The 2010–11 OB I bajnokság season was the 74th season of the OB I bajnokság, the top level of ice hockey in Hungary. Seven teams participated in the league, and Alba Volan Szekesfehervar won the championship.

== First round ==
Rank	Team	GP	W	OTW	OTL	L	Goals	Pts
1.	Budapest Stars	20	14	1	0	5	97:41	44
2.	Dunaújvárosi Acélbikák	20	14	0	1	5	116:51	43
3.	Ferencvárosi TC	20	11	1	2	6	88:74	37
4.	Miskolci Jegesmedvék Jégkorong Sportegyesület	20	10	2	2	6	112:73	36
5.	SAPA Fehérvár AV 19	20	6	1	0	13	62:98	20
6.	Újpesti TE	20	0	0	0	20	39:177	0

== Second round ==
Rank	Team	GP	W	OTW	OTL	L	Goals	Pts
1.	Budapest Stars	15	11	0	1	3	74:33	40 (6)
2.	Dunaújvárosi Acélbikák	15	10	2	0	3	87.38	38 (4)
3.	Miskolci Jegesmedvék Jégkorong Sportegyesület	15	7	1	2	5	68:59	25 (0)
4.	Ferencvárosi TC	15	5	2	2	6	57:63	23 (2)
5.	SAPA Fehérvár AV 19	15	4	1	1	9	43:57	15 (0)
6.	Újpesti TE	15	2	0	0	13	36:115	6 (0)

== Playoffs ==
=== Semifinals ===
- Alba Volán Székesfehérvár - Miskolci Jegesmedve Jégkorong Sport Egyesület 3:0 (7:6 SN, 9:1, 8:3)
- Budapešť Stars - Dunaújvárosi Acélbikák 2:3 (4:0, 1:2, 4:2, 2:5, 2:3)

=== Final ===
- Alba Volán Székesfehérvár - Dunaújvárosi Acélbikák 4:0 (2:1, 5:2, 7:4, 9:4)
