= Rob Pallin =

American ice hockey coach (born 1966)

Rob Pallin (born November 19, 1966, in Chisholm, Minnesota) is a professional ice hockey coach from the United States. He is serving as head coach of Austrian team HC TWK Innsbruck.

== Playing career ==
Pallin started skating at the age of three in his hometown Chisholm, Minnesota. He played for the Austin Mavericks and helped them win the 1984 USHL championship.

He played ice hockey at the University of Minnesota-Duluth (1985–87), before transferring to Western Michigan University in 1988. Following graduation, Pallin turned pro and played in Germany, France as well as for the Las Vegas Aces in the PSHL and WCHL sides Reno Rage and Fresno Falcons.

== Coaching career ==
Pallin began his coaching career in Las Vegas, where he coached at the AA Midget 18 under and 16 under level and AAA Midget 18 under level. In 2006, he was named head coach of the UNLV Hockey Club of the American Collegiate Hockey Association.

In 2011, he joined the Las Vegas Wranglers of the ECHL as an assistant coach. In 2013, Pallin moved back to Europe, accepting the head coach position of Hungarian club SAPA Fehervar AV19, which competes in the Austrian top-flight EBEL. They parted ways in January 2016. A couple of weeks later, fellow EBEL team HC TWK Innsbruck announced that Pallin has been appointed head coach of the club for the 2016–17 season.
