= 2005–06 OB I bajnoksag season =

Hungarian ice hockey season

The 2005–06 OB I bajnokság season was the 69th season of the OB I bajnokság, the top level of ice hockey in Hungary. Seven teams participated in the league, and Alba Volan Szekesfehervar won the championship.

== First round ==
	Club	GP	W	OTW	OTL	L	Goals	Pts
1.	Alba Volán Székesfehérvár	12	11	0	0	1	65:16	33
2.	Újpesti TE	12	10	0	0	2	88:28	30
3.	Dunaújvárosi AC	12	7	0	0	5	56:32	21
4.	Lokomotíva Nové Zámky	12	6	0	0	6	49:44	18
5.	Ferencvárosi TC	12	5	0	0	7	40:49	15
6.	Miskolci Jegesmedvék JSE	12	2	0	0	10	29:95	6
7.	Gyori ETO HC	12	1	0	0	11	23:86	3

== Qualification round ==
	Club	GP	W	OTW	OTL	L	Goals	Pts
4.	Ferencvárosi TC	6	5	0	0	1	34:19	15
5.	Miskolci Jegesmedvék JSE	6	3	0	0	3	24:22	9
6.	Lokomotíva Nové Zámky	6	3	0	0	3	22:23	9
7.	Gyori ETO HC	6	1	0	0	5	14:30	3

== Playoffs ==
=== Semifinals ===
- Alba Volán Székesfehérvár - Ferencvárosi TC 3:0 (6:4, 5:2, 6:0)
- Újpesti TE - Dunaújvárosi AC 3:1 (2:0, 0:2, 3:2, 4:0)

=== 3rd place ===
- Dunaújvárosi AC - Ferencvárosi TC 3:2 (3:5, 2:3, 2:0, 3:2, 7:3)

=== Final ===
- Alba Volán Székesfehérvár - Újpesti TE 4:1 (4:0, 3:5, 4:0, 4:1, 7:5)
