= 2007–08 OB I bajnoksag season =

Hungarian ice hockey season

The 2007–08 OB I bajnokság season was the 71st season of the OB I bajnokság, the top level of ice hockey in Hungary. Seven teams participated in the league, and Alba Volan Szekesfehervar won the championship.

== Regular season ==
	Club	GP	W	OTW	OTL	L	Goals	Pts
1.	Dunaújvárosi Acél Bikák	36	25	2	2	7	142:84	81
2.	HC Miercurea Ciuc	36	23	3	2	8	135:88	77
3.	SC Miercurea Ciuc	36	23	2	2	9	144:71	75
4.	Újpesti TE	36	19	2	1	14	126:100	62
5.	Ferencvárosi TC	36	12	1	1	22	110:144	39
6.	Alba Volán Székesfehérvár	36	6	0	3	27	78:193	21
7.	Miskolci Jegesmedvék JSE	36	5	2	1	28	90:155	20

== Playoffs ==
=== Quarterfinals ===
- HC Miercurea Ciuc - Miskolci Jegesmedvék JSE 2:0 (3:1, 5:1)
- SC Miercurea Ciuc - Ferencvárosi TC 2:0 (7:3, 2:1)
- Újpesti TE - Alba Volán Székesfehérvár 0:2 (1:2 OT, 1:5)

=== Semifinals ===
- SC Miercurea Ciuc - Alba Volán Székesfehérvár 0:3 (1:5, 2:3, 1:5)
- Dunaújvárosi Acél Bikák - HC Miercurea Ciuc 1:3 (2:6, 3:2, 1:2 SO, 2:3 OT)

=== 3rd place ===
- Dunaújvárosi Acél Bikák - SC Miercurea Ciuc 0:3 (1:4, 0:4, 1:5)

=== Final ===
- HC Miercurea Ciuc - Alba Volán Székesfehérvár 0:4 (3:5, 2:6, 1:9, 0:6)
