= Tyler Dietrich =

Canadian professional ice hockey coach

Tyler Dietrich, 2026

Tyler Dietrich (born July 2, 1984, in Vancouver, British Columbia) is a Canadian professional ice hockey coach. He currently serves as an assistant coach for Grizzlys Wolfsburg in the Deutsche Eishockey Liga (DEL).

== Career ==
Dietrich played WHL hockey with the Moose Jaw Warriors, the Medicine Hat Tigers and the Everett Silvertips, interrupted by a stint at BCHL teams Salmon Arm Silverbacks and Trail Smoke Eaters.

In 2005, he enrolled at the University of British Columbia, before transferring to the University of New Brunswick one year later. Dietrich was significantly slowed down by injuries throughout his playing career. He spent the final season (2009–10) of his playing career at St. Thomas University and subsequently turned to coaching, standing behind the bench of the Hollyburn Huskies at the Midget A1-T1 level during the 2010–11 season.

In 2011, he accepted a position as coach in the youth ranks of Hungarian club Székesfehérvár, enjoying great success in the following years. In 2015, he took over the head coaching job at the club's second men's team and prior to the 2016–17 campaign, was named head coach of the club's first squad, which competes in the Austrian elite league EBEL. During the pre-season in August 2016, Dietrich asked the club to cancel his contract. He then worked for Team Canada in different positions, including Video Coach during the 2016 Deutschland Cup and Manager, Hockey Operations for the National Junior Team. In this position, he helped Canada win the 2017 Spengler Cup.
