= 2002–03 OB I bajnoksag season =

Hungarian ice hockey season

The 2002–03 OB I bajnokság season was the 66th season of the OB I bajnokság, the top level of ice hockey in Hungary. Six teams participated in the league, and Alba Volan Szekesfehervar won the championship.

== First round ==
	Club	GP	W	T	L	Goals	Pts
1.	Alba Volán Székesfehérvár	10	10	0	0	88:19	20
2.	Dunaferr SE Dunaújváros	10	8	0	2	82:21	16
3.	Ferencvárosi TC	10	6	0	4	59:37	12
4.	Miskolci JJE	10	3	0	7	41:79	6
5.	Újpesti TE	10	3	0	7	31:78	6
6.	Györ Eto HC	10	0	0	10	9:76	0

== Final round ==
	Club	GP	W	T	L	Goals	Pts
1.	Alba Volán Székesfehérvár	12	11	1	0	84:26	23
2.	Dunaferr SE Dunaújváros	12	7	0	5	66:34	14
3.	Ferencvárosi TC	12	4	2	6	50:60	10
4.	Miskolci JJE	12	0	1	11	30:110	1

== Playoffs ==
=== 3rd place ===
- Ferencvárosi TC - Miskolci JJE 2:0 (5:2, 9:5)

=== Final ===
- Alba Volán Székesfehérvár - Dunaferr SE Dunaújváros 5:0 (6:5, 6:1, 6:5 OT, 3:2, 5:2)
