= 2006–07 OB I bajnoksag season =

Hungarian ice hockey season

The 2006–07 OB I bajnokság season was the 70th season of the OB I bajnokság, the top level of ice hockey in Hungary. Seven teams participated in the league, and Alba Volan Szekesfehervar won the championship.

== First round ==
	Club	GP	W	OTW	OTL	L	Goals	Pts
1.	Alba Volán Székesfehérvár	24	22	0	1	1	164:33	67
2.	Újpesti TE	24	18	0	1	5	121:63	55
3.	SC Miercurea Ciuc	24	15	1	0	8	101:73	47
4.	Dunaújvárosi Acél Bikák	24	13	0	1	10	85:57	40
5.	Miskolci Jegesmedvék JSE	24	5	3	0	16	58:113	21
6.	Ferencvárosi TC	24	5	1	1	17	68:128	18
7.	Titánok Székesfehérvár	24	1	0	1	22	51:181	4

== Qualification round ==
	Club	GP	W	OTW	OTL	L	Goals	Pts
3.	Dunaújvárosi Acél Bikák	24	19	1	1	3	116:36	60
4.	SC Miercurea Ciuc	24	20	0	0	4	129:65	60
5.	Ferencvárosi TC	24	9	1	2	12	86:100	31
6.	Miskolci Jegesmedvék JSE	24	6	2	0	16	69:98	22
7.	Titánok Székesfehérvár	24	2	0	1	21	55:156	7

== 5th-7th place ==
	Club	GP	W	OTW	OTL	L	Goals	Pts
5.	Miskolci Jegesmedvék JSE	4	3	0	0	1	12:10	6
6.	Ferencvárosi TC	4	2	0	2	16	21:13	4
7.	Titánok Székesfehérvár	4	1	0	3	21	14:24	2

== Playoffs ==
=== Semifinals ===
- Alba Volán Székesfehérvár - SC Miercurea Ciuc 3:0 (4:1, 4:1, 5:0)
- Újpesti TE - Dunaújvárosi Acél Bikák 2:3 (2:3 OT, 1:3, 5:4 SO, 3:1, 1:3)

=== 3rd place ===
- Újpesti TE - SC Miercurea Ciuc 1:2 (2:4, 8:2, 2:3 SO)

=== Final ===
- Alba Volán Székesfehérvár - Dunaújvárosi Acél Bikák 4:0 (5:1, 1:0, 2:0, 4:3)
