= 2009–10 OB I bajnoksag season =

Hungarian ice hockey season

The 2009–10 OB I bajnokság season was the 73rd season of the OB I bajnokság, the top level of ice hockey in Hungary. Six teams participated in the league, and SAPA Fehervar AV 19 won the championship.

== First round ==
Rank	Team	GP	W	OTW	OTL	L	Goals	Pts
1.	Dunaújvárosi Acélbikák	16	4	1	1	0	89:37	45
2.	Budapest Stars	16	6	1	2	7	39:49	22
3.	Újpesti TE	16	6	1	1	8	55:68	21
4.	Ferencvárosi TC	16	5	2	1	8	54:63	20
5.	Miskolci Jegesmedvék Jégkorong Sportegyesület	16	2	2	2	10	46:66	12

== Second round ==
Rank	Team	GP	W	OTW	OTL	L	Goals	Pts
1.	Dunaújvárosi Acélbikák	16	10	1	2	3	61:38	40 (6)
2.	Budapest Stars	16	10	2	1	3	61:42	39 (4)
3.	Ferencvárosi TC	16	7	1	0	8	48:49	22
4.	Újpesti TE	16	5	0	2	9	60:66	19 (2)
5.	Miskolci Jegesmedvék Jégkorong Sportegyesület	16	3	1	0	12	33:68	11

== Playoffs ==
=== Semifinals ===
- Dunaujvarosi Acelbikak - Budapest Stars 3-2 on series
- SAPA Fehervar AV 19 - Ferencvarosi TC 3-0 on series

=== Final ===
- SAPA Fehervar AV 19 - Dunaujvarosi Acelbikak 4-0 on series

=== 3rd place ===
- Budapest Stars - Ferencvarosi TC 3-1 on series
