= 2011–12 OB I bajnoksag season =

Hungarian ice hockey season

The 2011–12 OB I bajnoksag season was the 75th season of the OB I bajnoksag, the top level of ice hockey in Hungary. Alba Volán Székesfehérvár won the championship by defeating Miskolci JJSE in the final.

== Playoffs ==
=== Qualification ===
- Alba Volán Székesfehérvár - Újpesti TE 2:0 (4:0, 6:3)

=== Semifinals ===
- Dunaújvárosi Acélbikák - Alba Volán Székesfehérvár 0:3 (0:3, 1:6, 2:7)
- Miskolci JJSE - Ferencvárosi TC 3:2 (7:1, 3:4, 3:1, 3:6, 5:1)

=== Final ===
- Miskolci JJSE - Alba Volán Székesfehérvár 0:4 (1:7, 1:12, 0:7, 3:8)
