= 2004–05 OB I bajnoksag season =

Hungarian ice hockey season

The 2004–05 OB I bajnokság season was the 68th season of the OB I bajnokság, the top level of ice hockey in Hungary. Six teams participated in the league, and Alba Volan Szekesfehervar won the championship.

== First round ==
	Club	GP	W	OTW	OTL	L	Goals	Pts
1.	Alba Volán Székesfehérvár	10	9	0	1	0	65:10	28
2.	Dunaújvárosi AC	10	7	0	1	2	84:20	22
3.	Újpesti TE	10	5	2	1	2	42:23	20
4.	Ferencvárosi TC	10	4	1	0	5	36:33	14
5.	Miskolci Jegesmedvék JSE	10	1	0	0	9	15:95	3
6.	Gyori HC	10	1	0	0	9	16:77	3

== Second round ==
	Club	GP	W	OTW	OTL	L	Goals	Pts
1.	Újpesti TE	12	10	0	1	1	72:19	31
2.	Ferencvárosi TC	12	9	1	0	2	70:29	29
3.	Miskolci Jegesmedvék JSE	12	3	0	0	9	35:69	9
4.	Gyori HC	12	1	0	0	11	24:84	3

== Final round ==
	Club	GP	W	OTW	OTL	L	Goals	Pts
1.	Alba Volán Székesfehérvár	12	5	2	3	2	39:24	22
2.	Dunaújvárosi AC	12	5	2	2	3	44:32	21
3.	Újpesti TE	12	3	4	2	3	37:36	19
4.	Ferencvárosi TC	12	2	1	2	7	20:48	10

== Playoffs ==
=== 5th place ===
- Miskolci Jegesmedvék JSE - Gyori HC 3:0/3:5

=== 3rd place ===
- Újpesti TE - Ferencvárosi TC 3:2 (4:2, 3:4 n.P., 4:0, 1:5, 4:2)

=== Final ===
- Alba Volán Székesfehérvár - Dunaújvárosi AC 4:3 (3:4, 0:6, 3:1, 0:3, 3:2 SO, 5:1, 1:0)
