= Budapesti Korcsolyázó Egylet =

- Founded: 1869
- Based in: Budapest, Hungary
- Colors: Red, Yellow, Blue
- President: György Czakó
- Website: Official website

Budapesti Korcsolyázó Egylet (English: Budapest Skating Club, commonly abbreviated BKE) is a Budapest based ice skating sports association. Founded in 1869, it is one of the oldest of its kind in Hungary. They actively participate in competitive ice skating disciplines, such as figure skating, speed skating, and short track speed skating.

BKE also had an ice hockey team, which played their first official game in 1906, and won the Hungarian Championship title seven times.

== Ice hockey team ==
Hungarian Championship:

- Winners: 1937, 1938, 1939, 1940, 1942, 1944, 1946

Notable players

- György Pásztor

== Famous skaters ==
The following are ice skaters of the Budapesti Korcsolyázó Egylet, who participated at Winter Olympic Games, won medals at the European Championships or World Championships, or both.

=== Figure skating ===
==== Singles ====
- Tibor von Földváry
- Lily Kronberger
- Opika von Méray Horváth
- Andor Szende
- Elemér Terták
- Ede Király
- György Czakó
- Krisztina Czakó

==== Pairs ====
- Olga Orgonista – Sándor Szalay
- Emilia Rotter – László Szollás
- Lucy Galló – Rezső Dillinger
- Piroska Szekrényesy – Attila Szekrényesy
- Andrea Kékessy – Ede Király
- Marianna Nagy – László Nagy

=== Speed skating ===
- Kornél Pajor
