= Fehérvár AV19 =

Hungarian professional ice hockey team

- City: Székesfehérvár, Hungary
- League: Országos Bajnokság I 1978–2012; ICE Hockey League; 2007–present
- Founded: 1960
- Home arena: MET Aréna (Capacity: 6,000)
- Colors: Blue, white
- General manager: Viktor Szélig
- Head coach: Kevin Constantine
- Website: www.fehervarav19.hu

Franchise history
- 1960–1998: Székesfehérvári Volán SC
- 1998–2000: Alba Volán-Riceland
- 2000–2007: Alba Volán-FeVita
- 2007–2009: Alba Volánbusz Székesfehérvár
- 2009–2014: SAPA Fehérvár AV19
- 2014–2019: Fehérvár AV19
- 2019–present: Hydro Fehérvár AV19

Championships
- Hungarian champions: 13 (1981, 1999, 2001, 2003, 2004, 2005, 2006, 2007, 2008, 2009, 2010, 2011, 2012)

Hydro Fehérvár AV19 is a Hungarian professional ice hockey team that plays in the Austrian win2day ICE Hockey League. They were founded in 1960 and played from 1978 in the Hungarian Országos Bajnokság I through sorts of affiliations until 2012, claiming the Championship on 13 occasions. They played their home games at Ifjabb Ocskay Gábor Ice Hall in Székesfehérvár until the 2025/26 season where they moved to the newly built ALBA Aréna, now known as MET aréna. In 2009, the club was renamed after the main sponsor Sapa Profiles Kft Hungary, the Hungarian subsidiary of a Swedish aluminum group. The club did not have a main naming sponsor for a couple of years before 2019, however, in 2019 Hydro Extrusion Hungary Kft, the Hungarian subsidiary of the Norwegian company became the new naming sponsor, thus naming the club Hydro Fehérvár AV19.

== History ==
Székesfehérvári Volán Sports Club was founded in 1960. In 1964–65, the team started playing in outdoor rinks and 10 years later the hockey department came together with the intention of having a professional team. In 1977, the opening of a rink started a new chapter in the history of Hungarian hockey and Volan. At this point, only Budapest and Dunaújváros had suitable structure for hockey. They played their first season in the Hungarian championships in 1977–78, and three years later on the back of Budapest VSC folding and the Sports club benefiting from an influx of BVSC players captured their first Hungarian championship in 1981, becoming the first provincial team to do so.

At the turn of the millennium, Alba Volán-FeVita rose to prominence to become the top team in the nation. This culminated in the series of 10 consecutive championship titles of the Hungarian league from 2003. This turn of domination persuaded the club seek application into the Austrian League for stronger competition. This happened against the background, to better expose the players of the national team in the A-group level. In their first EBEL season in 2007–08, Alba Volánbusz experienced to skill level difference and finished in last place, this was offset however, by the successful Hungarian national team inclusion at the 2008 IIHF World Championships after seventy years back promotion to the highest international division.

Fehérvár AV19' still competed in the Hungarian Championship at first, with the club sourcing a farm team SAPA AV19 Székesfehérvár II in the Championship or the MOL Liga. However, after many years of struggling to field a competitive team in 2012 they were unable to participate in the Hungarian Championship, as they were required to enter their second team in the Erste Bank Junior League. They did not directly inform the Hungarian Ice Hockey Federation of their decision. This led to angst, however, the club still participated in the Hungarian Cup. In 2022 Fehérvár AV19 was second in the Austrian hockey league only defeated by EC Red Bull Salzburg. In 2025 the club moved to ALBA arena stadium which later got renamed to MET Aréna.

== Achievements ==
- Hungarian Championship:
  - Winners (13) : 1981, 1999, 2001, 2003, 2004, 2005, 2006, 2007, 2008, 2009, 2010, 2011, 2012
- Interliga:
  - Winners (2): 2003, 2007
- IIHF Continental Cup:
  - Third place (1) : 2005

== Players and personnel ==
=== Current roster ===
Updated 19 August 2024

No.	Nat	Player	Pos	S/G	Age	Acquired	Birthplace
22	(Canada)	Josh Atkinson	D	L	33	2023	St. Albert, Alberta, Canada
47	(Hungary)	Csongor Ambrus	C	R	23	2022	Miercurea Ciuc, Romania
87	(Hungary)	Gergő Ambrus	W	L	24	2021	Gheorgheni, Romania
10	(Hungary)	István Bartalis	C	L	35	2020	Miercurea Ciuc, Romania
–	(United States)	Chase Berger	C	L	31	2024	St. Louis, Missouri, United States
11	(United States)	Chris Brown	RW	R	35	2024	Flower Mound, Texas, United States
51	(Canada)	Tim Campbell	D	R	35	2019	Thornhill, Ontario, Canada
39	(United States)	Trevor Cheek	C	L	33	2024	Vancouver, Washington, United States
42	(Hungary)	Márkó Csollák	D	L	23	2022	Budapest, Hungary
36	(Hungary)	Csanád Erdély	C	L	30	2016	Dunaújváros, Hungary
21	(Hungary)	Ádám Falus	D	L	25	2023	Budapest, Hungary
16	(Hungary)	János Hári (C)	LW	L	34	2020	Budapest, Hungary
35	(Hungary)	Dominik Horváth	G	L	25	2021	Székesfehérvár, Hungary
18	(Canada)	Sam Jardine	D	L	32	2024	Lacombe, Alberta, Canada
17	(Hungary)	Roland Kiss	D	L	27	2023	Dunaújváros, Hungary
26	(Hungary)	Rasmus Kulmala	C	L	32	2024	Alastaro, Finland
92	(Slovenia)	Anže Kuralt	RW	R	34	2018	Kranj, Slovenia
82	(Hungary)	Bálint Magosi	RW	R	36	2021	Dunaújváros, Hungary
59	(Canada)	Joel Messner	D	R	32	2024	Winnipeg, Manitoba, Canada
93	(Hungary)	Ákos Mihály	W	R	26	2019	Miercurea Ciuc, Romania
13	(Hungary)	Kristof Németh		L	24	2021	Dunaújváros, Hungary
45	(Finland)	Rasmus Reijola	G	L	33	2024	Vantaa, Finland
14	(Hungary)	Balázs Sebők	C	L	31	2024	Budapest, Hungary
7	(Slovakia)	Martin Štajnoch	D	R	35	2024	Bojnice, Slovakia
5	(Hungary)	Bence Stipsicz	D	L	29	2017	Budapest, Hungary
34	(Hungary)	István Terbócs	RW	R	30	2021	Budapest, Hungary

=== Head coaches ===
Alternate Logo of Fehérvár AV19

- (Hungary) József Kertész 1977–1979
- (Hungary) Ambrus Kósa 1979–1981
- (Hungary) János Balogh 1981–1983
- (Hungary) Antal Palla 1983–1985
- (Hungary) Gábor Ocskay senior 1985–1988
- (Hungary) Ferenc Lőrincz 1988–1989
- (Hungary) Elek Tamás 1989–1991
- (Ukraine) Borisz Puskarjov 1996–97
- (Hungary) Tibor Kiss 1997–2000
- (Slovakia) Jan Jasko 2000–2003
- (Slovakia) Branislav Sajban 2003–2004
- (Canada) Pat Cortina 2004–2006
- (Czech Republic) Karol Dvorak 2006
- (Slovakia) Jan Jasko 2006–2008
- (Hungary) Lajos Énekes 2008
- (United States) Ted Sator 2008–2009
- (Hungary) Lajos Énekes 2009
- (Finland) Jarmo Tolvanen 2009–2010
- (Sweden) Ulf Weinstock 2010–2011
- (Canada) Kevin Primeau 2011–2012
- (Czech Republic) Jan Neliba 2012–2013
- (Canada) Marty Raymond 2013–2014
- (United States) Rob Pallin 2014–2016
- (Canada) Tyler Dietrich 2016
- (Canada) Benoit Laporte 2016–2017
- (Finland) Hannu Järvenpää 2017–2020
- (Finland) Antti Karhula 2020–2021
- (United States) Kevin Constantine 2021–23
- (Hungary) Dávid Kiss 2023-2025
- (Canada) Ted Dent 2025-

=== Honored members ===
Fehérvár AV19 retired numbers
No.	Player	Position	Career	No. retirement
19	Gábor Ocskay	C	1993–2009	1 April 2009
24	Krisztián Palkovics	RW	1993–2012	7 September 2012
25	Balázs Kangyal	D	1997–2008	27 January 2009
