= OB I Bajnokság =

Hungarian men's ice hockey top division

- Sport: Ice hockey
- Founded: 1937
- No. of teams: 7
- Country: Hungary
- Most recent champion: Budapest Akademia HC
- Broadcaster: Sport 1
- Related competitions: Erste Liga, EBEL
- Website: www.icehockey.hu

The Országos Bajnokság I (English: Nationwide Championship; commonly abbreviated OB I) is the highest level hockey league in Hungary.

After the formation of the MOL Liga, the OB I returned to having only Hungarian teams. The regular season coincides with the games played between the Hungarian teams in the MOL Liga, with these games also counting towards the national championship. As of the 2024-25 season, seven Hungarian teams contest the Hungarian championship. After the regular season of Erste Liga, a direct elimination playoff is played between these seven teams where the pairings are based on the table of the Erste Liga.

== Current teams ==
Teams currently in the OB I bajnokság.

Team	City	Arena	Capacity
Budapest Akademia HC	Budapest	Vasas Jégcentrum	1500
Debreceni EAC	Debrecen	Debreceni Jégcsarnok	590
Dunaújvárosi Acélbikák	Dunaújváros	Dunaújvárosi Jégcsarnok	4,500
DVTK Jegesmedvék	Miskolc	Miskolc Ice Hall	2,200
Ferencvárosi TC	Budapest	Tüskecsarnok	2,540
FEHA19	Székesfehérvár	Ifjabb Ocskay Gábor Ice Hall	3,600
Újpesti TE	Budapest	Megyeri úti Jégcsarnok	2,000

== Past winners ==
=== Champions by season ===
- 1936–37: Budapesti Korcsolyázó Egylet
- 1937–38: Budapesti Korcsolyázó Egylet
- 1938–39: Budapesti Korcsolyázó Egylet
- 1939–40: Budapesti Korcsolyázó Egylet
- 1940–41: Budapesti Budai TE
- 1941–42: Budapesti Korcsolyázó Egylet
- 1942–43: Budapesti Budai TE
- 1943–44: Budapesti Korcsolyázó Egylet
- 1944–45: not held
- 1945–46: Budapesti Korcsolyázó Egylet
- 1946–47: Magyar Testgyakorlók Köre
- 1947–48: Magyar Testgyakorlók Köre
- 1948–49: Magyar Testgyakorlók Köre
- 1949–50: Meteor Mallerd
- 1950–51: Budapesti Kinizsi SK
- 1951–52: Budapesti Vörös Meteor
- 1952–53: Budapesti Postás
- 1953–54: Budapesti Postás
- 1954–55: Budapesti Kinizsi SK
- 1955–56: Budapesti Kinizsi SK
- 1956–57: Budapesti Vörös Meteor
- 1957–58: Újpesti Dózsa SC
- 1958–59: Budapesti Vörös Meteor
- 1959–60: Újpesti Dózsa SC
- 1960–61: Ferencvárosi TC
- 1961–62: Ferencvárosi TC
- 1962–63: Budapesti Vörös Meteor
- 1963–64: Ferencvárosi TC
- 1964–65: Újpesti Dózsa SC
- 1965–66: Újpesti Dózsa SC
- 1966–67: Ferencvárosi TC
- 1967–68: Újpesti Dózsa SC
- 1968–69: Újpesti Dózsa SC
- 1969–70: Újpesti Dózsa SC
- 1970–71: Ferencvárosi TC
- 1971–72: Ferencvárosi TC
- 1972–73: Ferencvárosi TC
- 1973–74: Ferencvárosi TC
- 1974–75: Ferencvárosi TC
- 1975–76: Ferencvárosi TC
- 1976–77: Ferencvárosi TC
- 1977–78: Ferencvárosi TC
- 1978–79: Ferencvárosi TC
- 1979–80: Ferencvárosi TC
- 1980–81: Székesfehérvári Volán SC
- 1981–82: Újpesti Dózsa SC
- 1982–83: Újpesti Dózsa SC
- 1983–84: Ferencvárosi TC
- 1984–85: Újpesti Dózsa SC
- 1985–86: Újpesti Dózsa SC
- 1986–87: Újpesti Dózsa SC
- 1987–88: Újpesti Dózsa SC
- 1988–89: Ferencvárosi TC
- 1989–90: Jászberényi Lehel HC
- 1990–91: Ferencvárosi TC
- 1991–92: Ferencvárosi TC
- 1992–93: Ferencvárosi TC
- 1993–94: Ferencvárosi TC
- 1994–95: Ferencvárosi TC
- 1995–96: Dunaferr SE
- 1996–97: Ferencvárosi TC
- 1997–98: Dunaferr SE
- 1998–99: Alba Volán-Riceland
- 1999–00: Dunaferr SE
- 2000–01: Alba Volán-FeVita
- 2001–02: Dunaferr SE
- 2002–03: Alba Volán-FeVita
- 2003–04: Alba Volán-FeVita
- 2004–05: Alba Volán-FeVita
- 2005–06: Alba Volán-FeVita
- 2006–07: Alba Volán-FeVita
- 2007–08: Alba Volán SC
- 2008–09: Alba Volán SC
- 2009–10: SAPA Fehérvár AV 19
- 2010–11: SAPA Fehérvár AV 19
- 2011–12: SAPA Fehérvár AV 19
- 2012–13: Dunaújvárosi Acélbikák
- 2013–14: Dunaújvárosi Acélbikák
- 2014–15: Miskolci Jegesmedvék JSE
- 2015–16: DVTK Jegesmedvék
- 2016–17: DVTK Jegesmedvék
- 2017–18: MAC Budapest
- 2018–19: Ferencvárosi TC
- 2019–20: Ferencvárosi TC
- 2020–21: Ferencvárosi TC
- 2021–22: Ferencvárosi TC
- 2022–23: Ferencvárosi TC
- 2023–24: Ferencvárosi TC
- 2024–25: Budapest Akademia HC
- 2025–26: Budapest Akademia HC

=== Titles by club ===
Club	Titles	Years won
Ferencvárosi TC	31	1951, 1955, 1956, 1961, 1962, 1964, 1967, 1971, 1972, 1973, 1974, 1975, 1976, 1977, 1978, 1979, 1980, 1984, 1989, 1991, 1992, 1993, 1994, 1995, 1997, 2019, 2020, 2021, 2022, 2023, 2024
Újpesti TE	13	1958, 1960, 1965, 1966, 1968, 1969, 1970, 1982, 1983, 1985, 1986, 1987, 1988
Alba Volán SC Székesfehérvár	13	1981, 1999, 2001, 2003, 2004, 2005, 2006, 2007, 2008, 2009, 2010, 2011, 2012
Budapesti Korcsolyázó Egylet	7	1937, 1938, 1939, 1940, 1942, 1944, 1946
Dunaújvárosi Acélbikák	6	1996, 1998, 2000, 2002, 2013, 2014
Budapesti Vörös Meteor	4	1952, 1957, 1959, 1963
Magyar Testgyakorlók Köre	3	1947, 1948, 1949
DVTK Jegesmedvék	3	2015, 2016, 2017
MAC/Budapest Akademia HC	3	2018, 2025, 2026
Budapesti Budai TE	2	1941, 1943
Budapesti Postás	2	1953, 1954
Meteor Mallerd	1	1950
Jászberényi Lehel HC	1	1990
