= 2021–22 Erste Liga season =

2021–22 Erste Liga
- League: Erste Liga
- Sport: Ice hockey
- Teams: 11
- TV partner: M4 Sport

Regular season

Playoffs
- Finals champions: HSC Csíkszereda (4th title)
- Runners-up: FTC-Telekom

Erste Liga seasons
- ← 2020–21 2022–23 →

The 2021–22 Erste Liga was a season of the Erste Liga. The league's title sponsor was Erste Group. The defending champions were HSC Csíkszereda.

== Teams ==
Team	City	Arena	Capacity
DEAC	(Hungary) Debrecen	Debreceni Jégcsarnok	590
Dunaújvárosi Acélbikák	(Hungary) Dunaújváros	Dunaújvárosi Jégcsarnok	4,500
DVTK Jegesmedvék	(Hungary) Miskolc	Miskolc Ice Hall	2,200
Ferencvárosi TC	(Hungary) Budapest, IX. ker	Pesterzsébeti Jégcsarnok	2,400
MAC HKB Újbuda	(Hungary) Budapest, XI. ker	Tüskecsarnok	2,540
Fehérvári Titánok	(Hungary) Székesfehérvár	Ifjabb Ocskay Gábor Ice Hall	3,600
UNI Győr ETO HC	(Hungary) Győr	Győr Ice Rink	500
Újpesti TE	(Hungary) Budapest, IV. ker	Megyeri úti Jégcsarnok	2,000
Brașov Wolves	(Romania) Brașov	Brașov Olympic Ice Rink	1,604
Gyergyói HK	(Romania) Gheorgheni	Gyergyószentmiklósi Műjégpálya	1,000
HSC Csíkszereda	(Romania) Miercurea Ciuc	Lajos Vákár Ice Hall	3,500

== Regular season ==
Pos	Team	Pld	W	OTW	OTL	L	GF	GA	GD	Pts	Qualification
1	HSC Csíkszereda	40	27	3	5	5	195	110	+85	92	Qualification to Quarter-finals
2	FTC-Telekom	40	24	4	4	8	146	86	+60	84	Qualification to Quarter-finals
3	UTE	40	20	10	4	6	129	78	+51	84	Qualification to Quarter-finals
4	Gyergyói Hoki Klub	40	23	6	1	10	166	122	+44	82	Qualification to Quarter-finals
5	MAC HKB Újbuda	40	19	3	5	13	146	122	+24	68	Qualification to Quarter-finals
6	Brașov Wolves	40	21	0	4	15	151	128	+23	67	Qualification to Quarter-finals
7	DEAC	40	15	4	3	18	136	136	0	56	Qualification to Round of 16
8	DVTK Jegesmedvék	40	13	2	4	21	132	136	−4	47	Qualification to Round of 16
9	UNI Győr ETO HC	40	9	1	3	27	94	146	−52	32	Qualification to Round of 16
10	Titánok	40	10	1	0	29	92	192	−100	32	Qualification to Round of 16
11	Dunaújvárosi Acélbikák	40	3	2	3	32	76	207	−131	16	

Source: Erste Liga
Rules for classification: 1) Points; 2) Head-to-head points; 3) Head-to-head goal difference; 4) Goals scored; 5) Matches won; 6) Final standings of the last season.

== Play-offs ==
=== Bracket ===
Wild card round (best-of-5)
7	DEAC	3
10	Titánok	0
8	DVTK Jegesmedvék	3
9	UNI Győr ETO HC	1

Quarter-finals (best-of-7)
1	HSC Csíkszereda	4
5	MAC HKB Újbuda	1
2	FTC-Telekom	4
8	DVTK Jegesmedvék	1
3	UTE	2
7	DEAC	4
4	Gyergyói HK	4
6	Brașov Wolves	0

Semi-finals (best-of-7)
1	HSC Csíkszereda	4
7	DEAC	1
(Pairings are re-seeded after the first and second round)
2	FTC-Telekom	4
4	Gyergyói HK	1

Finals (best-of-7)
1	HSC Csíkszereda	4
2	FTC-Telekom	1

=== Wild card round ===
DEAC – Titánok 3–0
21.02.2022	DEAC	Titánok	5-0
22.02.2022	Titánok	DEAC	4-3
24.02.2022	DEAC	Titánok	2-5
DEAC won the series 3–0.

DVTK Jegesmedvék – UNI Győr ETO HC 3–1
21.02.2022	DVTK Jegesmedvék	UNI Győr ETO HC	4-2
22.02.2022	UNI Győr ETO HC	DVTK Jegesmedvék	1-2
24.02.2022	DVTK Jegesmedvék	UNI Győr ETO HC	0-3
25.02.2022	UNI Győr ETO HC	DVTK Jegesmedvék	2-5
DVTK Jegesmedvék won the series 3–1.

=== Quarterfinals ===
HSC Csíkszereda – MAC HKB Újbuda 4-1
03.03.2022	HSC Csíkszereda	MAC HKB Újbuda	4-1
04.03.2022	HSC Csíkszereda	MAC HKB Újbuda	5-4
07.03.2022	MAC HKB Újbuda	HSC Csíkszereda	5-2
08.03.2022	MAC HKB Újbuda	HSC Csíkszereda	2-5
11.03.2022	HSC Csíkszereda	MAC HKB Újbuda	5-4 ОТ
HSC Csíkszereda won the series 4–1.

FTC-Telekom – DVTK Jegesmedvék 4-1
01.03.2022	FTC-Telekom	DVTK Jegesmedvék	3-2
02.03.2022	FTC-Telekom	DVTK Jegesmedvék	4-3
05.03.2022	DVTK Jegesmedvék	FTC-Telekom	3-5
06.03.2022	DVTK Jegesmedvék	FTC-Telekom	3-1
09.03.2022	FTC-Telekom	DVTK Jegesmedvék	4-1
FTC-Telekom won the series 4–1.

UTE – DEAC 2-4
01.03.2022	UTE	DEAC	2-3
02.03.2022	UTE	DEAC	4-2
05.03.2022	DEAC	UTE	5-3
06.03.2022	DEAC	UTE	6-2
09.03.2022	UTE	DEAC	2-1 ОТ
11.03.2022	DEAC	UTE	7-4
DEAC won the series 4–2.

Gyergyói HK – Brașov Wolves 4-0
03.03.2022	Gyergyói HK	Brașov Wolves	4-1
04.03.2022	Gyergyói HK	Brașov Wolves	4-1
07.03.2022	Brașov Wolves	Gyergyói HK	1-5
08.03.2022	Brașov Wolves	Gyergyói HK	1-2
Gyergyói HK won the series 4–0.

=== Semifinals ===
HSC Csíkszereda – DEAC 4-1
18.03.2022	HSC Csíkszereda	DEAC	7-4
19.03.2022	HSC Csíkszereda	DEAC	1-0
22.03.2022	DEAC	HSC Csíkszereda	1-4
23.03.2022	DEAC	HSC Csíkszereda	4-3
25.03.2022	HSC Csíkszereda	DEAC	5-3
HSC Csíkszereda won the series 4–1

FTC-Telekom – Gyergyói HK 4-1
16.03.2022	FTC-Telekom	Gyergyói HK	0-1
17.03.2022	FTC-Telekom	Gyergyói HK	4-2
20.03.2022	Gyergyói HK	FTC-Telekom	0-7
21.03.2022	Gyergyói HK	FTC-Telekom	0-5 (awarded)
24.03.2022	FTC-Telekom	Gyergyói HK	5-0 (awarded)
FTC-Telekom won the series 4–1

=== Finals ===
1 April 2022; 18:30 (EEST)	HSC Csíkszereda	1−5 (0–2, 1–0, 0–3) score in the series: 0–1	FTC-Telekom	Vákár Lajos Ice Hall, Miercurea-Ciuc; Attendance: 1950

Game reference

Attila Adorján
Maxim Samankov
Goalies
Gergely Arany
Referees:
Márton Németh
Attila Nagy
Linesmen:
Bence Kövesi
Norbert Balla

	0–1	17:22 - Fowlie (A. Tóth, Seregély)
	0–2	18:54 - Kulmala (G. Nagy, Tamminen)
Stach (Skachkov, Sofron) - 32:59	1–2
	1–3	42:34 - Bán (Somogyi)
	1–4	44:01 - G. Toth (Fowlie)
	1–5	47:37 - Pavuk (Somogyi) (PP1)

10 min
Penalties
14 min
28
Shots
32

2 April 2022; 14:30 (EEST)	HSC Csíkszereda	3–2 (0–1, 3–1, 0–0) score in the series: 1–1	FTC-Telekom	Vákár Lajos Ice Hall, Miercurea-Ciuc; Attendance: 1,950

Game reference

Attila Adorján
Goalies
Gergely Arany
Referees:
Márton Németh
Attila Nagy
Linesmen:
Norbert Balla
Bence Kövesi

	0–1	06:42 - Tamminen (A. Tóth) (SH1)
Rokaly (Farkas) - 23:33	1–1
Stach (Sofron) - 25:39	2–1
	2–2	27:52 - Somogyi (McFadden, Fowlie) (PP1)
Stach (Skachkov, Fodor) - 29:20	3–2

20 min
Penalties
12 min
38
Shots
29

5 April 2022; 17:15 (CEST)	FTC-Telekom	1–5 (1–1, 0–2, 0–2) score in the series: 1–2	HSC Csíkszereda	Tüskecsarnok, Budapest; Attendance: 1,850

Game reference

Gergely Arany
Goalies
Attila Adorján
Referees:
Babic Vladimir
Rencz Dániel
Linesmen:
Muzsik Ferenc Norbert
Kis-Király Barna

Kóger (PP1) - 06:37	1–0
	1–1	09:01 - Kulyash (Stach, Sofron) (PP1)
	1–2	24:20 - Gecse (Részegh)
	1–3	25:40 - Stach
	1–4	42:11 - Kulyash (Skachkov, Stach) (PP2)
	1–5	59:17 - Áron-Sándor (Részegh) (PP1)

20 min
Penalties
20 min
44
Shots
20

6 April 2022; 18:30 (CEST)	FTC-Telekom	2–4 (0–1, 2–1, 0–2) score in the series: 1–3	HSC Csíkszereda	Tüskecsarnok, Budapest; Attendance: 2,227

Game reference

Gergely Arany
Goalies
Attila Adorján
Referees:
Attila Nagy
Zsombor Pálkövi
Linesmen:
Norbert Balla
Ferenc Norbert Muzsik

	0–1	08:05 - Kulyash (Skachkov, Sofron)
Kulmala (McFadden, Kóger) (PP1) - 30:11	1–1
	1–2	33:46 - Taratukhin (Lapenkov, Becze) (PP1)
Hajós (SH1) - 38:39	2–2
	2–3	49:17 - Taratukhin (Rokaly)
	2–4	59:45 - Részegh (Taratukhin, Láday)

6 min
Penalties
10 min
44
Shots
37

9 April 2022; 18:00 (EEST)	HSC Csíkszereda	5–3 (2–0, 1–0, 2–3) score in the series: 4–1	FTC-Telekom	Vákár Lajos Ice Hall, Miercurea-Ciuc; Attendance: 1,950

Game reference

Attila Adorján
Goalies
Gergely Arany
Referees:
Zsombor Pálkövi
Dániel Rencz
Linesmen:
Barna Kis-Király
Dávid Szabó

Skachkov (Kulyash) - 01:26	1–0
Részegh (Stach) (PP1) - 18:42	2–0
Skachkov (Sofron, Kulyash) (PP2) - 28:36	3–0
Stach (Kulyash) - 41:03	4–0
Sofron (Stach) (PP2) - 49:16	5–0
	5–1	52:12 - G. Nagy (PP1)
	5–2	54:49 - Tamminen
	5–3	59:35 - G. Nagy

18 min
Penalties
102 min
41
Shots
29

== Final rankings ==
Gold medal	HSC Csíkszereda
Silver medal	FTC-Telekom
Bronze medal	Gyergyói HK
4	DEAC
5	UTE
6	MAC HKB Újbuda
7	Brașov Wolves
8	DVTK Jegesmedvék
9	UNI Győr ETO HC
10	Titánok
11	Dunaújvárosi Acélbikák
