= Scott Macaulay =

Hungarian ice hockey player

- Born: 23 November 1990 (age 35) Winnipeg, Manitoba, Canada
- Height: 174 cm (5 ft 9 in)
- Weight: 79 kg (174 lb; 12 st 6 lb)
- Position: Defenceman
- Shot: Right
- Played for: Bakersfield Condors; Tulsa Oilers; Asplöven HC; Stavanger Oilers; MAC Budapest
- National team: Hungary
- NHL draft: Undrafted
- Playing career: 2013–2022

Scott Macaulay (born November 23, 1990) is a Canadian-born Hungarian former ice hockey player.

== Playing career ==
He played for Hungarian team MAC Budapest in the Erste Liga and the Hungarian national team.

== Personal life ==
He is the younger brother of the former ice hockey player Blair Macaulay.

== Career statistics ==
=== Regular season and playoffs ===
			Regular season					Playoffs
Season	Team	League	GP	G	A	Pts	PIM	GP	G	A	Pts	PIM
2005–06	Winnipeg Wild U18 AAA	MMHL	38	4	21	25	106	12	1	7	8	22
2006–07	Winnipeg Wild U18 AAA	MMHL	37	7	28	35	98	7	2	7	9	36
2006–07	Winnipeg Saints	MJHL	2	0	0	0	2	1	0	0	0	2
2007–08	Winnipeg Saints	MJHL	55	9	38	47	118	15	3	7	10	45
2008–09	Winnipeg Saints	MJHL	47	7	42	49	90	10	1	13	14	4
2009–10	Northern Michigan University	NCAA	32	0	3	3	24	—	—	—	—	—
2010–11	Northern Michigan University	NCAA	36	1	17	18	43	—	—	—	—	—
2011–12	Northern Michigan University	NCAA	36	3	14	17	60	—	—	—	—	—
2012–13	Northern Michigan University	NCAA	38	5	11	16	24	—	—	—	—	—
2012–13	Bakersfield Condors	ECHL	4	1	0	1	2	—	—	—	—	—
2013–14	Bakersfield Condors	ECHL	2	0	0	0	0	—	—	—	—	—
2013–14	Tulsa Oilers	CHL	53	3	22	25	22	6	1	3	4	5
2014–15	Tulsa Oilers	ECHL	72	9	37	46	52	5	0	3	3	10
2015–16	Asplöven HC	HockeyAllsvenskan	45	8	15	23	54	—	—	—	—	—
2016–17	Stavanger Oilers	GET-ligaen	42	3	11	14	46	11	1	2	3	2
2017–18	MAC Budapest	Erste Liga	38	9	16	25	—	12	3	6	9	—
2018–19	MAC Újbuda	Slovak Extraliga	47	1	8	9	26	8	0	0	0	10
2019–20	MAC Újbuda	Slovak Extraliga	47	2	19	21	80	—	—	—	—	—
2020–21	MAC HKB Újbuda	Erste Liga	29	5	11	16	—	5	2	3	5	—
2021–22	MAC HKB Újbuda	Erste Liga	35	4	23	27	16	5	0	4	4	2
2022–23	Winkler Royals	SEMHL	17	0	8	8	6	1	0	3	3	0
2023–24	Winkler Royals	SEMHL	2	0	4	4	4	—	—	—	—	—
ECHL totals			78	10	37	47	54	5	0	3	3	10

=== International ===
Year	Team	Event	GP	G	A	Pts	PIM
2019	Hungary	WC (D1A)	5	0	0	0	0
2020	Hungary	OGQ	3	0	0	0	4
2021	Hungary	OGQ	2	0	0	0	0
2022	Hungary	WC (D1A)	4	0	0	0	2
Senior totals			14	0	0	0	6
