= Stach (surname) =

The surnames Stach, Štach or von Stach have multiple origins. The feminine form of the Czech surname Štach is Štáchová. Notable people include:

- Aleksandra Stach (born 2000), Polish canoeist
- Anton Stach, (born 1998), German footballer
- David Stach (born 1992), Czech ice hockey player
- Eric Stach, American materials scientist
- Georg Stach (1912–1943), German racing cyclist
- Helena Štáchová (1944–2017), Czech puppeteer, voice actress and playwright.
- Ilse von Stach (1879–1941), German writer
- Jagoda Stach (born 1983), Polish child actress
- Jan Stach (1877–1975), Polish zoologist
- Lubomír Štach (born 1986), Czech ice hockey player
- Matthäus Stach (1711–1787), Moravian missionary
- Miroslav Stach, Czechoslovak canoeist
- Reiner Stach (born 1951), German author
