= Keber =

Keber is a surname. There are 472 people with this last name in Slovenia. Notable people with the surname include:

- Eloise Quiñones Keber, Professor of Art History at Baruch College
- Jasmina Keber (born 1988), German-born crossminton player from Slovenia
