= Gergő Nagy (ice hockey) =

Hungarian ice hockey player (born 1989)

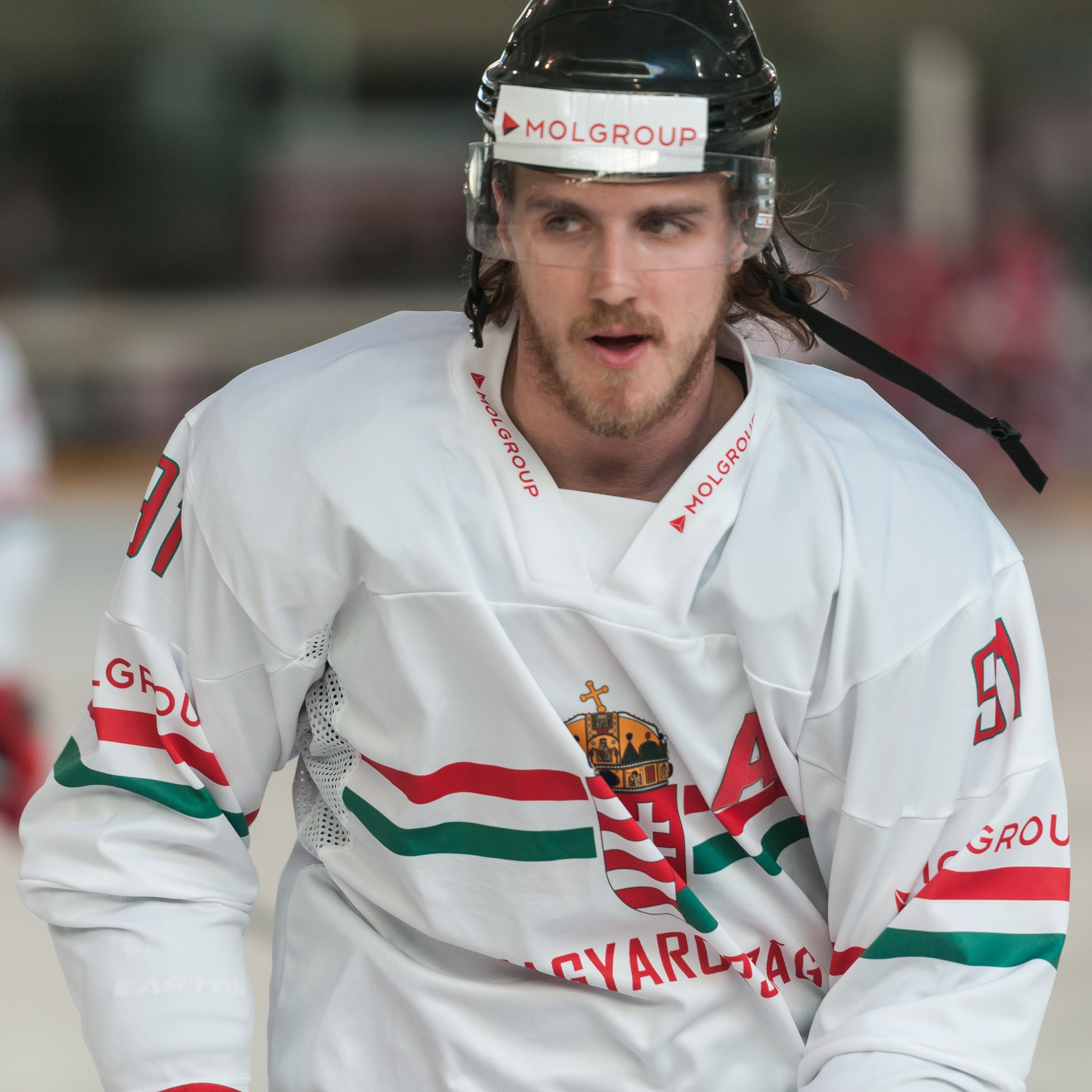
- Born: 10 October 1989 (age 36) Dunaújváros, Hungary
- Height: 1.91 m (6 ft 3 in)
- Weight: 96 kg (212 lb; 15 st 2 lb)
- Position: Forward
- Shoots: Left
- Erste Liga team Former teams: Budapest JA HC: Alba Volán Székesfehérvár; DVTK Jegesmedvék; HK FTC Nové Zámky; Quad City Mallards; Chicago Wolves; Kalamazoo Wings; MAC Budapest; Ferencvárosi TC
- National team: Hungary
- NHL draft: Undrafted
- Playing career: 2006–present

Gergő Dániel Nagy (born 10 October 1989) is a Hungarian professional ice hockey forward. He has played in the Erste Liga with Budapest Jégkorong Akadémia HC since the 2024–25 season.

== Playing career ==
Nagy returned to Alba Volán Székesfehérvár on 1 July 2015, after two North American seasons within the Chicago Wolves organization of the American Hockey League (AHL).

Nagy competed at the 2009 Men's World Ice Hockey Championships and 2016 Men's World Ice Hockey Championships as a member of the Hungary men's national ice hockey team.
