= 2019 Crossminton World Championships =

Tournament details
- Dates: 04–07 July
- Edition: 5th
- Competitors: 505 from 23 nations
- Venue: Tüskecsarnok
- Location: Budapest, Hungary

The 2019 ICO Crossminton World Championships was a crossminton tournament, taking place in Budapest, Hungary, between 4 and 7 July 2019. With the 1st Crossminton World Championships being played in 2011 and the competition taking place every two years, the 2019 World Championships was the 5th Crossminton World Championships. 505 players from 23 countries participated at the event.

== Venue ==
The tournament, organised by the Hungarian Crossminton Association, was played in Budapest’s multi-purpose indoor arena Tüskecsarnok.

== Medal summary ==
* Host nation (Hungary)

Rank	Nation	Gold	Silver	Bronze	Total
1	Slovenia (SLO)	2	1	0	3
2	Germany (GER)	1	2	4	7
3	Japan (JPN)	1	0	0	1
3	Sweden (SWE)	1	0	0	1
5	Czech Republic (CZE)	0	1	3	4
6	Ukraine (UKR)	0	1	0	1
7	Poland (POL)	0	0	2	2
8	Croatia (CRO)	0	0	1	1
Totals (8 entries)		5	5	10	20

== Medalists ==
Event	Gold	Silver	Bronze
Open (Men)	(Sweden) Per Hjalmarson	(Ukraine) Mykhailo Mandrik	(Czech Republic) Petr Makrlik
Open (Men)	(Sweden) Per Hjalmarson	(Ukraine) Mykhailo Mandrik	(Poland) Marcin Ociepa
Women	(Slovenia) Jasmina Keber	(Slovenia) Lori Škerl	(Germany) Anna Hubert
Women	(Slovenia) Jasmina Keber	(Slovenia) Lori Škerl	(Czech Republic) Eliška Andrlova
Open doubles	(Germany) Patrick Schusseler (Germany) David Zimmermans	(Czech Republic) Petr Makrlik (Czech Republic) Daniel Knofliček	(Germany) Nico Franke (Germany) Maximilian Franke
Open doubles	(Germany) Patrick Schusseler (Germany) David Zimmermans	(Czech Republic) Petr Makrlik (Czech Republic) Daniel Knofliček	(Germany) Sonke Kaatz (Germany) Robin Joop
Women's doubles	(Slovenia) Danaja Knez (Slovenia) Lori Škerl	(Germany) Andrea Horn (Germany) Anja Rolfes	(Croatia) Laura Jagečić (Croatia) Zrinka Jagečić
Women's doubles	(Slovenia) Danaja Knez (Slovenia) Lori Škerl	(Germany) Andrea Horn (Germany) Anja Rolfes	(Czech Republic) Anna Andrlova (Czech Republic) Eliška Andrlova
Mixed doubles	(Japan) Yurina Abe (Japan) Akihiko Nishimura	(Germany) Anna Hubert (Germany) Sebastian Christoph	(Germany) Jana Huckinghaus (Germany) Adrian Lutz
Mixed doubles	(Japan) Yurina Abe (Japan) Akihiko Nishimura	(Germany) Anna Hubert (Germany) Sebastian Christoph	(Poland) Marta Urbanik (Poland) Wojciech Wilkosz

== Junior Tournament Medalists ==
Event	Gold	Silver	Bronze
U18 boys	(Mauritius) Shaheem Elaheebocus	(Poland) Maciej Filipowicz	(Latvia) Arturs Dzirkalis
U18 boys	(Mauritius) Shaheem Elaheebocus	(Poland) Maciej Filipowicz	(Poland) Szymon Michiewicz
U18 girls	(Mauritius) Sendilla Mourat	(Hungary) Georgina Veres	(Croatia) Nika Miškulin
U18 girls	(Mauritius) Sendilla Mourat	(Hungary) Georgina Veres	(Croatia) Gala Zukić
U14 boys	(Czech Republic) Matej Krupička	(Slovakia) Viliam Kopilec	(Slovenia) Žak Kolenc
U14 boys	(Czech Republic) Matej Krupička	(Slovakia) Viliam Kopilec	(Belgium) Thyago Martens
U14 girls	(Czech Republic) Zuzana Holesinska	(Latvia) Agate Kristiana Spare	(Slovenia) Ana Marija Vintar
U14 girls	(Czech Republic) Zuzana Holesinska	(Latvia) Agate Kristiana Spare	(Czech Republic) Andrea Škodova
U12 boys	(Slovakia) Jan Ščavnicky Jr.	(Hungary) Marcell Kovacs	(Latvia) Gints Viksnins
U12 boys	(Slovakia) Jan Ščavnicky Jr.	(Hungary) Marcell Kovacs	(Poland) Dominik Dryja
U12 girls	(Czech Republic) Natalia Krpalkova	(Hungary) Janka Gergo	(Slovenia) Tija Bervar
U12 girls	(Czech Republic) Natalia Krpalkova	(Hungary) Janka Gergo	(Slovenia) Eva Župevc
U18 boys' doubles	(Poland) Maciej Filipowicz (Poland) Szymon Michniewicz	(Czech Republic) Jan Lichy (Czech Republic) Ondrej Volek	(Czech Republic) Matej Krupička (Czech Republic) Pavel Rada
U18 boys' doubles	(Poland) Maciej Filipowicz (Poland) Szymon Michniewicz	(Czech Republic) Jan Lichy (Czech Republic) Ondrej Volek	(Poland) Mateusz Faska (Poland) Maciej Michalik
U18 girls' doubles	(Croatia) Gala Zukić (Croatia) Nika Miškulin	(Hungary) Georgina Veres (Hungary) Janka Gergo	(Czech Republic) Andrea Škodova (Czech Republic) Jesika Škodova
U18 girls' doubles	(Croatia) Gala Zukić (Croatia) Nika Miškulin	(Hungary) Georgina Veres (Hungary) Janka Gergo	(Slovenia) Pika Rogelj (Slovenia) Hana Zorec

== Senior Tournament Medalists ==
Event	Gold	Silver	Bronze
O40 open	(Germany) Patrick Schüsseler	(Slovakia) Jan Ščavnicky Sr.	(Norway) Morten Pasche
O40 open	(Germany) Patrick Schüsseler	(Slovakia) Jan Ščavnicky Sr.	(Poland) Mariusz Sawicki
O40 women	(Hungary) Helga Braun	(Czech Republic) Marketa Wernerova	(Japan) Haruna Akita
O40 women	(Hungary) Helga Braun	(Czech Republic) Marketa Wernerova	(Hungary) Beata Fenyvesy
O50 open	(Hungary) Laszlo Racz	(Poland) Piotr Borowiec	(Slovakia) Jozef Gibala
O50 open	(Hungary) Laszlo Racz	(Poland) Piotr Borowiec	(Hungary) Károly Vincze
O50 women	(Hungary) Zsuzsanna Gerber	(Germany) Regina Ströbel	(Czech Republic) Vladena Bergmanova
O50 women	(Hungary) Zsuzsanna Gerber	(Germany) Regina Ströbel	(Slovakia) Henrieta Syč-Krivanova

== Participating nations ==
Country
Belgium
Bulgaria
Croatia
Czech Republic
France
Germany
Hungary
India
Japan
Latvia
Lithuania
Mauritius
Netherlands
Norway
Poland
Russia
Serbia
Slovakia
Slovenia
Spain
Sweden
Switzerland
Ukraine
