= 2024–25 Erste Liga season =

2024–25 Erste Liga
- League: Erste Liga
- Sport: Ice hockey
- Duration: Regular season: 13 September 2024 – 12 February 2025; Playoff: 9 March 2025 – 17 April 2025
- Number of teams: 10
- Top scorer: (Hungary) Bodó Christopher (35 goals)

Play-offs
- Finals champions: Gyergyói HK (2nd title)
- Runners-up: HSC Csíkszereda

Erste Liga seasons
- ← 2023–24 season 2025–26 season →

The 2024–25 Erste Liga started on 17th September 2024. The league's title sponsor was Erste Bank. The defending champions were Corona Brașov.

== Teams ==
Team	City	Arena	Capacity
Budapest Akademia HC	(Hungary) Budapest	Vasas Jégcentrum	1,500
Corona Brașov	(Romania) Brașov (Brassó)	Brașov Olympic Ice Rink	1,604
HSC Csíkszereda	(Romania) Miercurea Ciuc (Csíkszereda)	Lajos Vákár Ice Hall	3,500
Debreceni EAC	(Hungary) Debrecen	Debreceni Jégcsarnok	590
Dunaújvárosi Acélbikák	(Hungary) Dunaújváros	Dunaújvárosi Jégcsarnok	4,500
DVTK Jegesmedvék	(Hungary) Miskolc	Miskolc Ice Hall	2,200
FEHA19	(Hungary) Székesfehérvár	Ifjabb Ocskay Gábor Ice Hall	3,600
Ferencvárosi TC	(Hungary) Budapest	Tüskecsarnok	2,540
Gyergyói HK	(Romania) Gheorgheni (Gyergyószentmiklós)	Gheorgheni Artificial Ice Hall	1,480
Újpesti TE	(Hungary) Budapest	Megyeri úti Jégcsarnok	2,000

== Regular season ==
Pos	Team	Pld	W	OTW	OTL	L	GF	GA	GD	Pts	Qualification
1	Budapest Akademia HC	36	22	4	4	6	138	91	+47	78	Qualification to Play-offs
2	Gyergyói HK	36	24	2	2	8	160	101	+59	78	Qualification to Play-offs
3	Debreceni EAC	36	19	4	1	12	144	117	+27	66	Qualification to Play-offs
4	Corona Brașov	36	17	3	1	15	113	119	−6	58	Qualification to Play-offs
5	Ferencvárosi TC	36	14	5	3	14	133	115	+18	55	Qualification to Play-offs
6	HSC Csíkszereda	36	13	4	2	17	83	94	−11	49	Qualification to Play-offs
7	DVTK Jegesmedvék	36	12	3	6	15	94	104	−10	48	Qualification to Play-offs
8	Újpesti TE	36	12	2	5	17	100	116	−16	45	Qualification to Play-offs
9	FEHA19	36	10	4	3	19	82	113	−31	41	
10	Dunaújvárosi Acélbikák	36	6	0	4	26	91	168	−77	22	

Updated to match(es) played on March 9, 2025. Source: Erste Liga
Rules for classification: 1) Points; 2) Head-to-head points; 3) Head-to-head goal difference; 4) Goals scored; 5) Matches won; 6) Final standings of the last season.

== Play-offs ==
=== Bracket ===
Quarter-finals (best-of-7)
1	Budapest Akademia HC	4
8	Újpesti TE	0
3	Debreceni EAC	1
6	HSC Csíkszereda	4
2	Gyergyói HK	4
7	DVTK Jegesmedvék	1
4	Corona Brașov	4
5	Ferencvárosi TC	1

Semi-finals (best-of-7)
1	Budapest Akademia HC	1
6	HSC Csíkszereda	4
2	Gyergyói HK	4
4	Corona Brașov	1

Finals (best-of-7)
2	Gyergyói HK	4
6	HSC Csíkszereda	2

=== Semifinals ===
Budapest Akademia HC – HSC Csíkszereda 1-4
25.03.2025	Budapest Akademia HC	HSC Csíkszereda	1-2
26.03.2025	Budapest Akademia HC	HSC Csíkszereda	0-2
29.03.2025	HSC Csíkszereda	Budapest Akademia HC	5-2
30.03.2025	HSC Csíkszereda	Budapest Akademia HC	1-2
01.04.2025	Budapest Akademia HC	HSC Csíkszereda	3-4
HSC Csíkszereda won the series 4–1

Gyergyói HK – Corona Brașov 4-1
25.03.2025	Gyergyói HK	Corona Brașov	4-1
26.03.2025	Gyergyói HK	Corona Brașov	1-0
29.03.2025	Corona Brașov	Gyergyói HK	2-5
30.03.2025	Corona Brașov	Gyergyói HK	3-2
01.04.2025	Gyergyói HK	Corona Brașov	2-1
Gyergyói HK won the series 4–1

=== Finals ===
8 April 2025; 19:00 (EEST)	Gyergyói HK	4−2 (1−1, 1−0, 2−1) score in the series: 1−0	HSC Csíkszereda	Gyergyószentmiklósi Műjégpálya, Gheorgheni; Attendance: 1,250

Game reference

9 April 2025; 19:00 (EEST)	Gyergyói HK	2−1 (1−1, 1−0, 0−0) score in the series: 2−0	HSC Csíkszereda	Gyergyószentmiklósi Műjégpálya, Gheorgheni; Attendance: 1,250

Game reference

12 April 2025; 18:30 (EEST)	HSC Csíkszereda	5−2 (3−1, 0−1, 2−0) score in the series: 1−2	Gyergyói HK	Vákár Lajos Ice Hall, Miercurea-Ciuc; Attendance: 1,950

Game reference

13 April 2025; 18:30 (EEST)	HSC Csíkszereda	3−2 (0−1, 2−1, 1−0) score in the series: 2−2	Gyergyói HK	Vákár Lajos Ice Hall, Miercurea-Ciuc; Attendance: 1,950

Game reference

15 April 2025; 19:00 (EEST)	Gyergyói HK	3-2 (0−0, 2−0, 1−2) score in the series: 3−2	HSC Csíkszereda	Gyergyószentmiklósi Műjégpálya, Gheorgheni; Attendance: 1,270

Game reference

17 April 2025; 18:30 (EEST)	HSC Csíkszereda	1-3 (1−1, 0−1, 0−1) score in the series: 2−4	Gyergyói HK	Vákár Lajos Ice Hall, Miercurea-Ciuc; Attendance: 1,950

Game reference
