= Tamás Pozsgai =

Hungarian ice hockey player (born 1988)

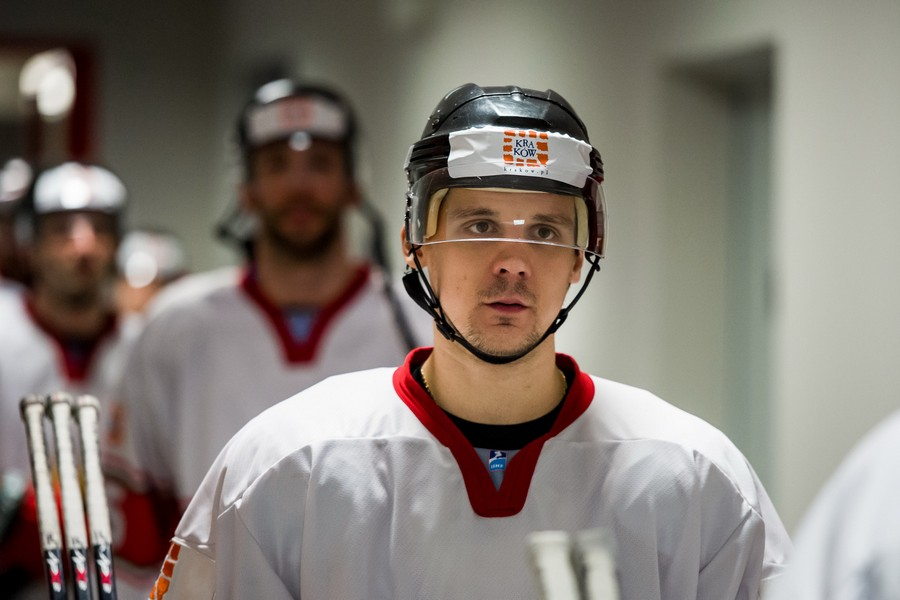
- Tamás Pozsgai
- Born: 26 July 1988 (age 36); Dunaújváros, Hungary
- Height: 185 cm (6 ft 1 in)
- Weight: 88 kg (194 lb; 13 st 12 lb)
- Position: Defenceman
- Catches: Left
- MOL team Former teams: MAC Budapest; Dunaújváros; Alba Volán Székesfehérvár
- National team: Hungary
- Playing career: 2006–present

Tamás Pozsgai (born 27 July 1988 in Dunaújváros) is a Hungarian professional ice hockey defenceman who plays for MAC Budapest in the MOL Liga.
