= 2013 ICO Crossminton World Championships =

Crossminton tournament held in June 2013 in Germany

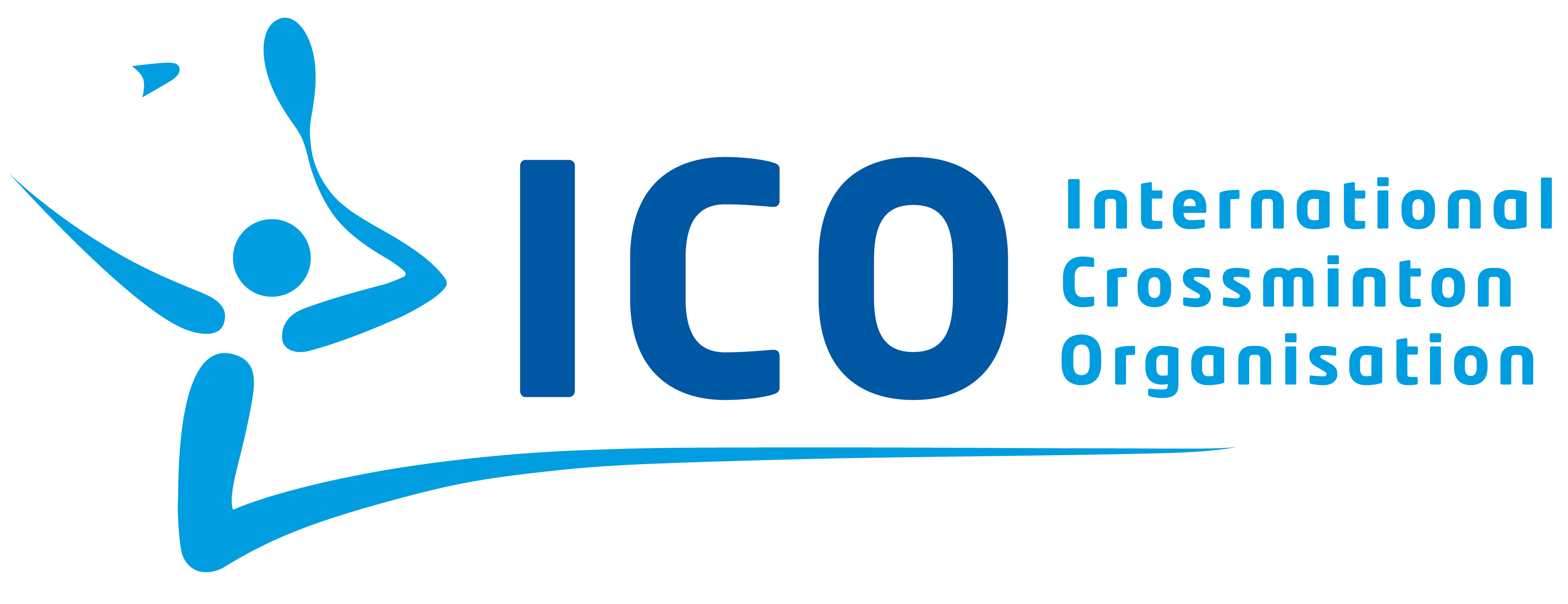

Tournament details
- Dates: 13 June–15 June
- Edition: 2nd
- Competitors: 479 from 29 nations
- Venue: Steffi-Graf-Stadion
- Location: Berlin, Germany

The 2013 ICO Crossminton World Championships was a crossminton tournament, taking place in Berlin, Germany, between 13 and 15 June 2013. With the 1st Crossminton World Championships being played in 2011 and the competition taking place every two years, the 2013 World Championships was the 2nd ICO Crossminton World Championships ever being played. 479 players from 29 countries participated at the event that took place at a time when crossminton was still named speed badminton.

== Venue ==
The tournament, organised by Speedminton GmbH and International Speed Badminton Organisation, was played on outdoor tennis clay courts of the Steffi-Graf-Stadion in Berlin.

== Medal summary ==
* Host nation (Germany)

Rank	Nation	Gold	Silver	Bronze	Total
1	Germany (GER)	2	0	3	5
2	Sweden (SWE)	1	1	2	4
3	Hungary (HUN)	1	0	1	2
3	Slovenia (SLO)	1	0	1	2
5	Slovakia (SVK)	0	2	2	4
6	Poland (POL)	0	1	1	2
7	Switzerland (CHE)	0	1	0	1
Totals (7 entries)		5	5	10	20

== Medalists ==
Event	Gold	Silver	Bronze
Open (Men)	(Germany) Patrick Schüsseler	(Sweden) Melker Ekberg	(Sweden) Per Hjalmarson
Open (Men)	(Germany) Patrick Schüsseler	(Sweden) Melker Ekberg	(Germany) Rene Lewicki
Women	(Slovenia) Jasmina Keber	(Poland) Marta Soltys-Matera	(Slovakia) Barbora Syč-Krivanova
Women	(Slovenia) Jasmina Keber	(Poland) Marta Soltys-Matera	(Germany) Jennifer Greune
Open doubles	(Sweden) Per Hjalmarson (Sweden) Mattias Aronsson	(Switzerland) Severin Wirth (Switzerland) Ivo Junker	(Slovakia) Jan Ščavnicky Sr. (Slovakia) Vladimir Pjecha
Open doubles	(Sweden) Per Hjalmarson (Sweden) Mattias Aronsson	(Switzerland) Severin Wirth (Switzerland) Ivo Junker	(Germany) Daniel Gossen (Germany) Rene Lewicki
Women's doubles	(Hungary) Krisztina Bognar (Hungary) Agnes Darnyik	(Slovakia) Lucia Syč-Krivanova (Slovakia) Barbora Syč-Krivanova	(Poland) Janina Karasek (Poland) Kasia Witwicka
Women's doubles	(Hungary) Krisztina Bognar (Hungary) Agnes Darnyik	(Slovakia) Lucia Syč-Krivanova (Slovakia) Barbora Syč-Krivanova	(Hungary) Beata Fenyvesi (Hungary) Nora Gaal
Mixed doubles	(Germany) Jennifer Greune (Germany) Daniel Gossen	(Slovakia) Alexandra Kacvinska (Slovakia) Tomaš Pavlovsky	(Slovenia) Jasmina Keber (Slovenia) Matjaž Šušteršič
Mixed doubles	(Germany) Jennifer Greune (Germany) Daniel Gossen	(Slovakia) Alexandra Kacvinska (Slovakia) Tomaš Pavlovsky	(Sweden) Rebecca Nielsen (Sweden) Melker Ekberg

== Junior Tournament Medalists ==
Event	Gold	Silver	Bronze
U18 boys	(Hungary) Bence Palinkas	(Slovakia) Tomaš Pavlovsky	(Germany) David Zimmermans
U18 boys	(Hungary) Bence Palinkas	(Slovakia) Tomaš Pavlovsky	(Hungary) Oliver Vincze
U18 girls	(Slovakia) Alexandra Kacvinska	(Croatia) Tea Grofelnik	(Slovenia) Danaja Knez
U18 girls	(Slovakia) Alexandra Kacvinska	(Croatia) Tea Grofelnik	(Slovakia) Kristina Ščavnicka
U14 boys	(Slovenia) Jaša Jovan	(Hungary) Christoph Gerber	(Switzerland) David Camen
U14 boys	(Slovenia) Jaša Jovan	(Hungary) Christoph Gerber	(Germany) Nico Franke
U14 girls	(Slovenia) Rebeka Škerl	(Slovakia) Ema Neštakova	(Slovenia) Lori Škerl
U14 girls	(Slovenia) Rebeka Škerl	(Slovakia) Ema Neštakova	(Czech Republic) Anna Andrlova

== Senior Tournament Medalists ==
Event	Gold	Silver	Bronze
O40 open	(Germany) Ulrich Burkhardt	(Hungary) Jozsef Benke	(Ukraine) Konstantin Onufriychuk
O40 open	(Germany) Ulrich Burkhardt	(Hungary) Jozsef Benke	(Hungary) Tamas Dozsa
O35 women	(Hungary) Beata Fenyvesi	(Hungary) Nora Gaal	(Germany) Ute Baldauf
O35 women	(Hungary) Beata Fenyvesi	(Hungary) Nora Gaal	(Germany) Regina Ströbel
O50 open	(Sweden) Hans Granberg	(United Kingdom) Robert Wynne	(Poland) Bogdan Miezynski
O50 open	(Sweden) Hans Granberg	(United Kingdom) Robert Wynne	(Poland) Lech Garwolinski

== Participating nations ==
Country
Argentina
Australia
Austria
Canada
Croatia
Czech Republic
Denmark
Finland
France
Germany
Great Britain
Hungary
Italy
Latvia
Mauritius
Netherlands
New Zealand
Norway
Poland
Portugal
Puerto Rico
Russia
Serbia
Slovakia
Slovenia
Spain
Sweden
Switzerland
Ukraine
