= 2011 ICO Crossminton World Championships =

2011 Crossminton World Championships
Tournament details
- Dates: 24–25 August
- Edition: 1st
- Competitors: 370 from 29 nations
- Venue: Steffi-Graf-Stadion
- Location: Berlin, Germany

The 2011 ICO Crossminton World Championships, with the full name 1. ISBO Azimut Hotels Speedminton World Championships, was a crossminton tournament, taking place in Berlin, Germany, a between 24 and 25 August 2011. It was the 1st ever Crossminton World Championships to be played and 370 players from 29 countries participated at the event that took place at a time when crossminton was still named speed badminton.

== Venue ==
The tournament, organised by Speedminton GmbH, was played on outdoor tennis clay court of the Steffi-Graf-Stadion in Berlin.

== Medal summary ==
* Host nation (Germany)

Rank	Nation	Gold	Silver	Bronze	Total
1	Germany (GER)	2	1	2	5
2	Sweden (SWE)	1	1	0	2
3	Slovenia (SLO)	0	1	0	1
4	Poland (POL)	0	0	2	2
5	Denmark (DEN)	0	0	1	1
5	Slovakia (SVK)	0	0	1	1
Totals (6 entries)		3	3	6	12

== Medalists ==
Event	Gold	Silver	Bronze
Open (Men)	(Sweden) Per Hjalmarson	(Germany) Daniel Gossen	(Denmark) Kristian Hansen
Open (Men)	(Sweden) Per Hjalmarson	(Germany) Daniel Gossen	(Germany) Rene Lewicki
Women	(Germany) Janet Köhler	(Slovenia) Jasmina Keber	(Poland) Kasia Witwicka
Women	(Germany) Janet Köhler	(Slovenia) Jasmina Keber	(Poland) Janina Karasek
Open doubles	(Germany) Daniel Gossen (Germany) Rene Lewicki	(Sweden) Per Hjalmarson (Sweden) Björn Karlsson	(Germany) Patrick Schüsseler (Germany) Ulrich Burkhardt
Open doubles	(Germany) Daniel Gossen (Germany) Rene Lewicki	(Sweden) Per Hjalmarson (Sweden) Björn Karlsson	(Slovakia) Barbora Syč-Krivanova (Slovakia) Andrej Ostrihon

== Junior Tournament Medalists ==
Event	Gold	Silver	Bronze
U18 boys	(Slovakia) Tomaš Pavlovsky	(Croatia) Dasen Jardas	(Poland) Jakub Kosicki
U18 boys	(Slovakia) Tomaš Pavlovsky	(Croatia) Dasen Jardas	(Hungary) Bence Palinkas
U18 girls	(Slovakia) Alexandra Kacvinska	(Slovakia) Lenka Levkova	(Croatia) Tea Grofelnik
U18 girls	(Slovakia) Alexandra Kacvinska	(Slovakia) Lenka Levkova	(Hungary) Zita Ruby
U14 boys	(Slovakia) Adam Kakula	(Croatia) Bruno Grofelnik	(Germany) Alexander Gollmer
U14 boys	(Slovakia) Adam Kakula	(Croatia) Bruno Grofelnik	(Slovakia) Rene Lecso
U14 girls	(Croatia) Paula Barkovic	(Germany) Jocelin Pusch	(Slovakia) Kristina Scavnicka
U14 girls	(Croatia) Paula Barkovic	(Germany) Jocelin Pusch	(Slovakia) Terezia Gibalova

== Senior Tournament Medalists ==
Event	Gold	Silver	Bronze
O40 open	(Germany) Ulrich Burkhardt	(Croatia) Damir Ilic	(Hungary) Gyorgyi Vaczi
O40 open	(Germany) Ulrich Burkhardt	(Croatia) Damir Ilic	(Switzerland) Andreas Wolner-Hanssen
O35 women	(France) Karine Chabrel	(Germany) Constanze Lorang	(Germany) Regina Ströbel
O35 women	(France) Karine Chabrel	(Germany) Constanze Lorang	(France) Isabelle Vaillant
O50 open	(France) Vincent Krieger	(France) Jocelyn Perdreau	(United Kingdom) Robert Wynne
O50 open	(France) Vincent Krieger	(France) Jocelyn Perdreau	(Germany) Lex Erlacher

== Participating nations ==
Country
Australia
Austria
Brasil
Bulgaria
Canada
Croatia
Czech Republic
Denmark
Finland
France
Germany
Great Britain
Hungary
Ireland
Italy
Latvia
Mauritius
Netherlands
Norway
Poland
Portugal
Romania
Russia
Serbia
Slovakia
Slovenia
Sweden
Switzerland
USA
