= Crossminton =

Badminton variation

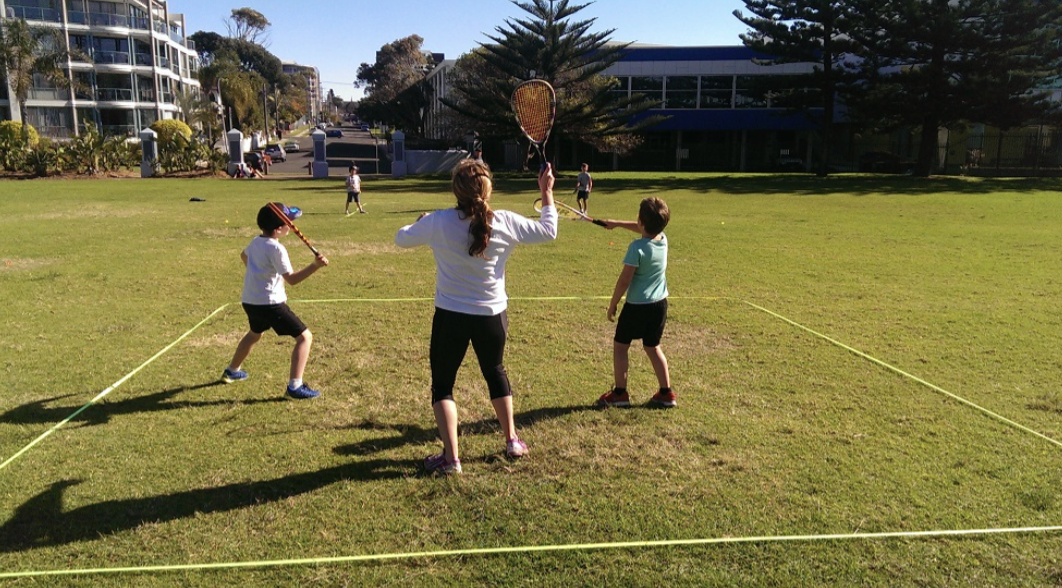
Crossminton players

Crossminton, previously known as Speed Badminton, is a racket game that combines elements from different sports like badminton, squash and tennis. It is played without any net and has no prescribed playground, so it can be executed on tennis courts, streets, beaches, fields or gyms.

The sport is often associated with the brand Speedminton because of their historical relation. From 1 January 2016 the name of the racket sport has been changed from Speed Badminton to Crossminton. Today, Crossminton is played all around the world. Currently, there are tournaments all over the world which are organized by a growing number of clubs. On 25 August 2011, the International Crossminton Organization (ICO) was founded under the name International Speed Badminton Organisation (ISBO) in Berlin. By 2018 the ICO already had 26 members – national federations from Europe, America, Asia and Africa.

== History ==
The special shuttlecock and the concept of the game were invented in 2001 in Berlin by Bill Brandes. The game was later refined into its final form, crossminton by the Speedminton company. The inventor first named his new sport "shuttleball", but soon the game was renamed "speed badminton". Starting from January 2016 the name was changed again, to crossminton. Originally, the idea of the inventor was to create an outdoor variant of badminton, so he changed the ball to be smaller and heavier (today called speeder). The analogy of badminton now exists only in a technical way: there is no net and the game tempo is faster. In 2003, there were already 6,000 active players in Germany. The sport is growing steadily and there are numerous international tournaments across Europe.

== Game ==
=== Court ===
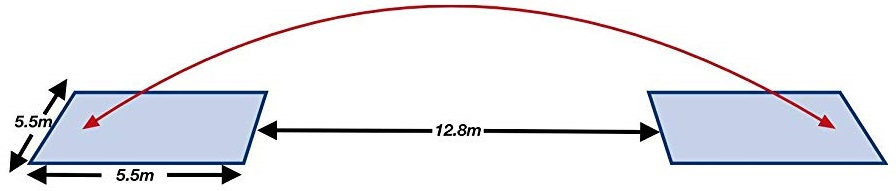
Crossminton court

The court consists of two squares of 5.50 m (18 ft) length. They are fixed opposite to each other at a distance of 12.8 m (42 ft).

=== Equipment ===
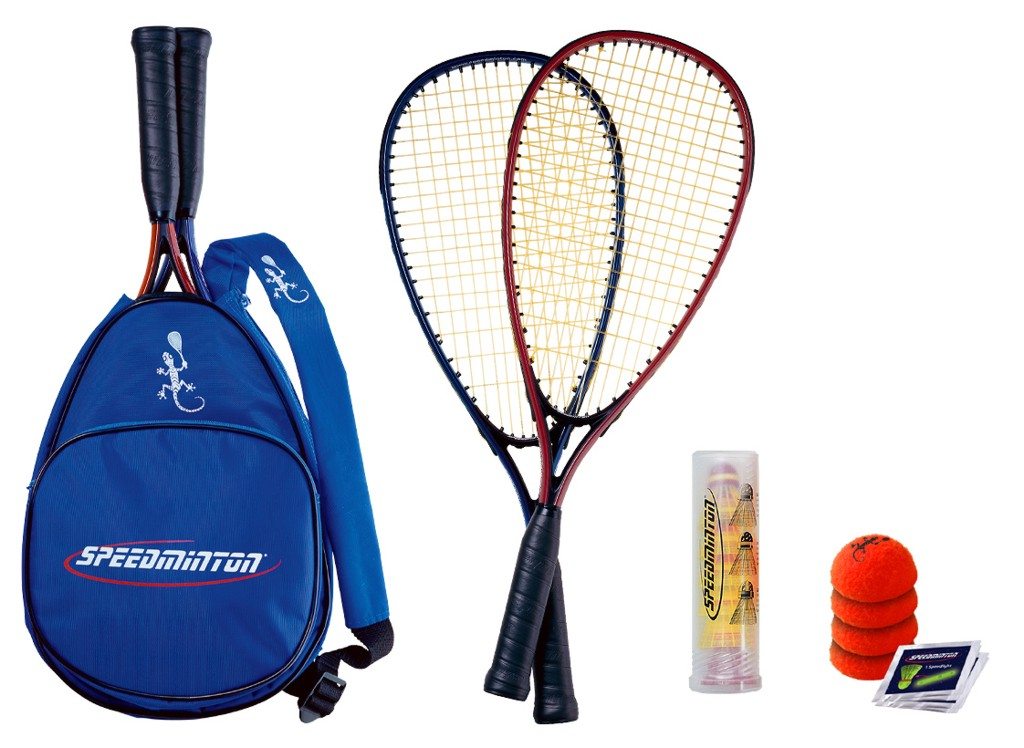
Equipment

Both of the players need a racket. The rackets are similar to the ones used in squash but are specially produced for Crossminton. They are 58–60 cm long, and the material and the strings are different. The shuttlecock is called a speeder and is heavier than a conventional badminton shuttlecock, meaning it can be used up to wind force 4.

Speeder-Type	Flight distance	Speed
Fun Speeder	13–18 m	260 km/h
Match Speeder	17–25 m	290 km/h

=== Rules ===
The field consists of two squares measuring 5.5 meters (18 ft) on each side. The distance between the squares is 12.8 meters (42 ft). Crossminton can be played on half of a tennis court which can easily be modified with elastic lines. Match Speeders are used for normal games. Children and adolescents (U12) play with fun speeders on a smaller court (4x4 m) over a smaller distance (9 meters).

The aim of the game is to reach the square of the opposite player with the speeder. If the speeder falls outside the opposite square, the other side gains a point. Both players are allowed to step out of, or anywhere inside their square during play.

The game ends when one player has at least 16 points and has at least 2 points advantage over their opponent. Every time a set/round finishes, the players switch sides.

==== Match ====
A game ends when one player reaches 16 points. If the score is tied at 15 or greater, play continues until one player has a two-point advantage. A match usually consists of two winning sets (best of three).

==== Service ====
The right to serve first is drawn by throwing a coin or a speeder. Every player has three serves. Every rally scores. At a score of 15:15 the serve switches after every point. The serve must be done out of the designated zone which is 3 m behind the front offensive line. This line must not be crossed and the serve is played bottom-up. The first serve of the next set is done by the loser of the previous set.

==== Points ====
Every rally scores if there is no necessity to repeat it. Points can be gained if:

- the serve is not correct
- the speeder touches the floor or the roof
- the speeder lands in the opposite court and cannot be returned
- the speeder lands outside the court (the lines count as being within the court)
- the speeder is touched two times immediately after each other
- the speeder touches the body

If a player returns a speeder from outside the court, it is considered to still be in play.

==== Change of ends ====
After every set, there is a change of ends to guarantee equal opportunities concerning wind and lighting conditions. If a third game (tiebreak) becomes necessary, players change sides after every 6 points.

=== Variants ===
- Doubles : The doubles match is played on a single court.

At the doubles division, both players are standing in the same court. The coin or speeder decides the side who serves first. The serving player stands at the backline, and their partner stands in front. The serves rotate between the four players. The first serve in the following set goes to the loser of the previous one.

- Black lighting : Crossminton can be played at night with fluorescent equipment and black light.

Crossminton can be played outside and inside; the court can be painted or pegged off. There is even the possibility to use a portable court. Crossminton, which is played in the dark, is called Blackminton. With black lights, fluorescent paints, rackets and special speeders (night speeders) with glow sticks (speedlights) it is possible to play even at night.

== International Crossminton Organisation ==
International Crossminton Organisation
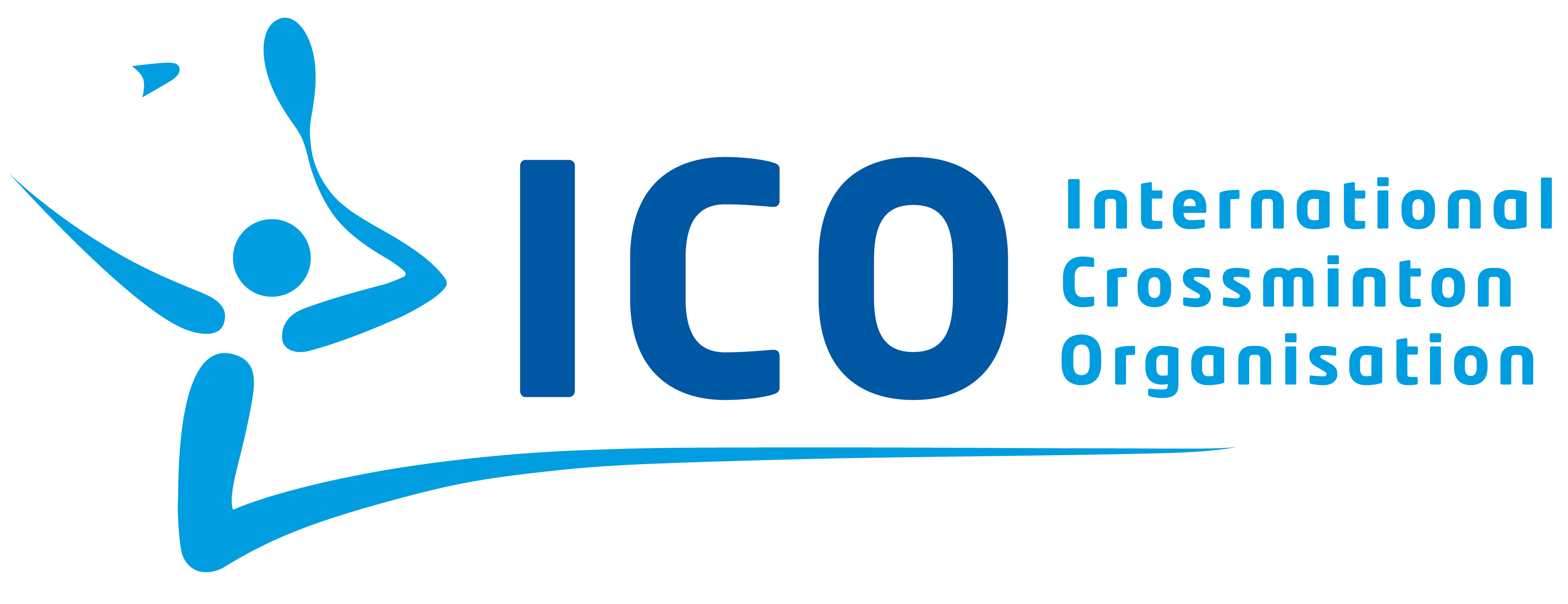
- Logo of ICO
- Abbreviation: ICO
- Founded: 25 August 2011; 15 years ago
- Type: Federation of national associations
- Legal status: Governing body of crossminton
- Purpose: Sport governance
- Headquarters: Berlin, Germany
- Region served: Worldwide
- Members: 31 national associations (2018) / 36 (2025)
- Official languages: English
- President: Matjaž Šušteršič
- Financial officer: Yoko Koizumi
- Board of Executives: Maximilian Franke; Petr Marklik; Daniel Robles Rodríguez; Charly Knobling
- Secretary General: René Lewicki
- Main organ: General Assembly
- Website: www.crossminton.org

International Crossminton Organisation was founded in 2011. 36 nation members in March 2025:

1. Asia (6): Bangladesh,India,Iran,Japan,South Korea,Pakistan
2. Oceania (0): –
3. Africa (3): Central African Republic,Ivory Coast,Mauritius
4. Americas (4): Colombia,United States,Dominican Republic,Mexico
5. Europe (23):

BEL, BUL, CRO, CZE, ENG, FRA, GER, HUN, ISR, LAT, NED, NOR, POL, ROU, RUS, SRB, SVK, SLO, SPA, SWE, SUI, TUR, UKR.

== World & European Championships ==
The first Crossminton (former Speed Badminton) World Championships took place on 26 and 27 August 2011. It was officially named ‘ISBO Azimut Hotels Speedminton® World Championships’. Over 380 participants from 29 countries played in Berlin, in 10 categories. Players from Canada, the US and Australia also attended. Per Hjalmarson from Sweden won the men's title, Janet Köhler from Germany won the women's title and Rene Lewicki & Daniel Gossen from Germany won the doubles title in the final games. Since then the World and European Championships alternate every year.

Overview of World & European Crossminton Championships – adults & U18 (U19 since 2021)
Year	Tournament	City	Open division		Female open		Open doubles		Female doubles		Mixed doubles		U18 (U19 since 2021) male		U18 (U19 since 2021) female				
Year	Tournament	City				Champion	Runner-up	Champion	Runner-up	Champion	Runner-up	Champion	Runner-up	Champion	Runner-up	Champion	Runner-up	Champion	Runner-up
2011	1. ICO Crossminton World Championships	(Germany) Berlin	(Sweden) Per Hjalmarson	(Germany) Daniel Gossen	(Germany) Janet Köhler	(Slovenia) Jasmina Keber	(Germany) Daniel Gossen (Germany) René Lewicki	(Sweden) Per Hjalmarson (Sweden) Björn Karlsson	not played		not played		(Slovakia) Tomáš Pavlovský	(Croatia) Dasen Jardas	(Slovakia) Alexandra Kacviňská	(Slovakia) Lenka Levková			
2012	3. ISBO European Championships	(Croatia) Poreč	(Sweden) Per Hjalmarson	(Sweden) Mattias Aronsson	(Slovenia) Jasmina Keber	(Hungary) Ágnes Darnyik	(Sweden) Mattias Aronsson (Sweden) Per Hjalmarson	(Slovenia) Samo Lipušček (Slovenia) Robi Titovšek	(Hungary) Krisztina Bognar (Hungary) Ágnes Darnyik	(Slovenia) Helena Halas (Slovenia) Jasmina Keber	(Germany) Daniel Gossen (Germany) Jennifer Greune	(Slovakia) Tomáš Pavlovský (Slovakia) Alexandra Kacviňská	(Slovakia) Tomáš Pavlovský	(Poland) Jakub Kosicki	(Hungary) Zita Ruby	(Slovakia) Alexandra Kacviňská			
2013	2. ICO Crossminton World Championships	(Germany) Berlin	(Germany) Patrick Schüsseler	(Sweden) Melker Ekberg	(Slovenia) Jasmina Keber	(Poland) Marta Soltys	(Sweden) Mattias Aronsson (Sweden) Per Hjalmarson	(Switzerland) Ivo Junker (Switzerland) Severin Wirth	(Hungary) Krisztina Bognar (Hungary) Ágnes Darnyik	(Slovakia) Barbora Syč-Kriváňová (Slovakia) Lucia Syč-Kriváňová	(Germany) Daniel Gossen (Germany) Jennifer Greune	(Slovakia) Tomáš Pavlovský (Slovakia) Alexandra Kacviňská	(Hungary) Bence Pálinkás	(Slovakia) Tomáš Pavlovský	(Slovakia) Alexandra Kacviňská	(Croatia) Tea Grofelnik			
2014	4. ISBO European Championships	(Poland) Warsaw	(Sweden) Per Hjalmarson	(Serbia) Mladen Stankovic	(Slovenia) Jasmina Keber	(Germany) Jennifer Greune	(Poland) Tomasz Kaczmarek (Poland) Marcin Ociepa	(Sweden) Mattias Aronsson (Sweden) Per Hjalmarson	(Hungary) Krisztina Bognar (Hungary) Ágnes Darnyik	(Poland) Janina Karasek (Poland) Marta Soltys	(Germany) Daniel Gossen (Germany) Jennifer Greune	(Slovenia) Matjaž Šusteršič (Slovenia) Jasmina Keber	(Hungary) Bence Pálinkás	(Slovenia) Jaša Jovan	(Slovakia) Nikola Bariaková	(Slovakia) Terezia Gibalová			
2015	3. ICO Crossminton World Championships	(Germany) Berlin	(Sweden) Per Hjalmarson	(Ukraine) Myhailo Mandryk	(Slovenia) Jasmina Keber	(Germany) Janet Köhler	(Sweden) Mattias Aronsson (Sweden) Per Hjalmarson	(Germany) Patrick Schüsseler (Germany) David Zimmermanns	(Poland) Janina Karasek (Poland) Marta Soltys	(Germany) Andrea Horn (Germany) Verena Horn	(Sweden) Melker Ekberg (Sweden) Rebecca Nielsen	(Slovenia) Matjaž Šusteršič (Slovenia) Jasmina Keber	(Germany) Nico Franke	(Spain) Saudo Tejada Dámaso	(Czech Republic) Eliška Andrlová	(Slovenia) Danaja Knez			
2016	5. ICO European Championships	(France) Gouesnou	(Germany) David Zimmermanns	(Germany) Sönke Kaatz	(Slovenia) Danaja Knez	(Sweden) Rebecca Nielsen	(Germany) Patrick Schüsseler (Germany) David Zimmermanns	(Sweden) Mattias Aronsson (Sweden) Per Hjalmarson	(Germany) Andrea Horn (Germany) Franziska Ottrembka	(France) Alexandra Desfarges (France) Julie Guyot	(Sweden) Melker Ekberg (Sweden) Rebecca Nielsen	(Hungary) Tamás Dósza (Hungary) Ágnes Darnyik	(Germany) Nico Franke	(Poland) Szymon Andrzejewski	(Slovenia) Lori Škerl	(Slovenia) Rebeka Škerl			
2017	4. ICO Crossminton World Championships	(Poland) Warsaw	(Sweden) Per Hjalmarson	(Poland) Marcin Ociepa	(Hungary) Ágnes Darnyik	(Germany) Janet Köhler	(Germany) Robin Joop (Germany) Sönke Kaatz	(Germany) Patrick Schüsseler (Germany) David Zimmermanns	(Hungary) Krisztina Bognar (Hungary) Ágnes Darnyik	(Germany) Anna Hubert (Germany) Franziska Ottrembka	(Sweden) Melker Ekberg (Sweden) Rebecca Nielsen	(Slovakia) Ján Ščavnický (Slovakia) Tamara Lukáčová	(Slovenia) Jaša Jovan	(Germany) Nico Franke	(Czech Republic) Eliška Andrlová	(Slovenia) Lori Škerl			
2018	6. ICO Speedminton European Championships 2018	(Norway) Skien	(Czech Republic) Petr Makrlík	(Sweden) Per Hjalmarson	(Czech Republic) Eliška Andrlová	(Poland) Marta Urbanik	(Czech Republic) Petr Makrlík (Czech Republic) Daniel Knoflíček	(Germany) Patrick Schüsseler (Germany) David Zimmermanns	(Germany) Andrea Horn (Germany) Anja Rolfes	(Poland) Sabina Schabek (Poland) Marta Urbanik	(Sweden) Melker Ekberg (Sweden) Rebecca Nielsen	(Croatia) Nikola Kucina (Croatia) Paula Barković	(Hungary) Dávid Takács	(Poland) Maciej Filipowicz	(Czech Republic) Anna Andrlová	(Croatia) Nika Miškulin			
2019	5. ICO Crossminton World Championships	(Hungary) Budapest	(Sweden) Per Hjalmarson	(Ukraine) Myhailo Mandryk	(Slovenia) Jasmina Keber	(Slovenia) Lori Škerl	(Germany) Patrick Schüsseler (Germany) David Zimmermanns	(Czech Republic) Petr Makrlík (Czech Republic) Daniel Knoflíček	(Slovenia) Lori Škerl (Slovenia) Danaja Knez	(Germany) Andrea Horn (Germany) Anja Rolfes	(Japan) Yurina Abe (Japan) Akihiko Nishimura	(Germany) Sebastian Christoph (Germany) Anna Hubert	(Mauritius) Shameem Elaheebocus	(Poland) Maciej Filipowicz	(Mauritius) Sendilla Mourat	(Hungary) Georgina Veres			
2020	6. ICO European Championships 2020 (Cancelled : COVID-19 pandemics)																		
2021	6. ICO Crossminton World Championships (played in 2022 due to COVID-19 pandemics)	(Croatia) Zagreb	(Japan) Akihiko Nishimura	(Czech Republic) Petr Makrlík	(Japan) Yurina Abe	(Slovenia) Jasmina Keber Šušteršič	(Switzerland) Ivo Junker (Switzerland) Severin Wirth	(Czech Republic) Petr Makrlík (Czech Republic) Daniel Knoflíček	(Slovenia) Jasmina Keber Šušteršič (Slovenia) Danaja Knez	(Czech Republic) Tereza Hogenová (Czech Republic) Tereza Šimková	(Japan) Yurina Abe (Japan) Akihiko Nishimura	(Hungary) Pál Pádár (Hungary) Edit Osvay	(Latvia) Arturs Dzirkalis	(Poland) Mateusz Faska	(Czech Republic) Zuzana Holesinska	(Slovakia) Katarína Daduľáková			
2023	7. ICO Crossminton World Championships 2024	(Czech Republic) Brno																	
2024	7. ICO European Championships 2024	(Hungary) Balatonboglár																	

== International tournaments ==
There are many international crossminton tournaments taking place all around the world under the supervision of the International Crossminton Organization. Every member country can host up to one 1000/500 points tournament and four 250 points tournaments every year. There are only five 1000 points tournaments every year, chosen by the ICO based on the applications sent by member federations. The series of 1000 and 500 points tournaments is called World Series.

By participating in international ICO tournaments the players receive ranking points based on their results. Ranking points are used to determine seeding for upcoming tournaments.

World Series Tournaments in 2018
Date	Tournament	City	Open Division		Female Open		Open Doubles	
Date	Tournament	City	Champion	Runner-up	Champion	Runner-up	Champion	Runner-up
17.-18.3.2018	**10. ICO Speedminton® Slovenian Open**	(Slovenia) Laško	(Ukraine) Myhailo Mandryk	(Sweden) Melker Ekberg	(Slovenia) Jasmina Keber	(Slovenia) Lori Škerl	(Sweden) Melker Ekberg (Czech Republic) Petr Makrlík	(Slovenia) Jaša Jovan (Germany) David Zimmermanns
28.-29.4.2018	**10. ICO Speedminton® Hungarian Open**	(Hungary) Kiskunfélegyháza	(Czech Republic) Petr Makrlík	(Sweden) Per Hjalmarson	(Slovenia) Jasmina Keber	(Hungary) Ágnes Darnyik	(Sweden) Per Hjalmarson (Czech Republic) Petr Makrlík	(Poland) Grzegorz Chmielewski (Poland) Tomasz Moskal
5.-6.5.2018	11. ICO Speedminton® Croatian Open	(Croatia) Zagreb	(Czech Republic) Petr Makrlík	(Slovenia) Jaša Jovan	(Slovenia) Lori Škerl	(Czech Republic) Eliška Andrlová	(Slovakia) Adam Kakula (Czech Republic) Petr Makrlík	(Germany) Marcel Herrmann (Germany) David Zimmermanns
19.-20.5.2018	9. ICO Speedminton® SLOVAK Open	(Slovakia) Banská Bystrica	(Czech Republic) Petr Makrlík	(Ukraine) Myhailo Mandryk	(Slovenia) Lori Škerl	(Slovakia) Barbora Syč-Kriváňová	(Sweden) Melker Ekberg (Czech Republic) Petr Makrlík	(Slovakia) Adam Kakula (Slovakia) Andrej Ostrihoň
1.-2.6.2018	ICO Speedminton® Japan Open	(Japan) Tokyo	(Germany) David Zimmermanns	(Hungary) Olivér Vincze	(Japan) Yuka Nishimura	(Germany) Andrea Horn	(Japan) Shinichi Nagata (Germany) Patrick Schüsseler	(Japan) Akihiko Nishimura (Germany) David Zimmermanns
22.-23.6.2018	**ICO Speedminton® Polish Open**	(Poland) Warsaw	(Germany) Nico Franke	(Czech Republic) Petr Makrlík	(Slovenia) Danaja Knez	(Poland) Marta Urbanik	(Sweden) Melker Ekberg (Czech Republic) Petr Makrlík	(Germany) Robin Joop (Germany) Adrian Lutz
21.7.2018	2018 ICO Speedminton® Swedish Open	(Sweden) Gothenburg	(Sweden) Per Hjalmarson	(Sweden) Melker Ekberg	(Sweden) Rebecca Nielsen	(Czech Republic) Eliška Andrlová	(Sweden) Mattias Aronsson (Sweden) Per Hjalmarson	(Germany) Robin Joop (Germany) Sönke Kaatz
8.-9.9.2018	2018 ICO Speedminton® Serbian Open	(Serbia) Sombor	(future event)					
29.-30.9.2018	**8. ICO Speedminton® Czech Open 2018**	(Czech Republic) Brno	(future event)					
19.-21.10.2018	**2018 ICO Speedminton® German Open**	(Germany) Fürstenfeldbruck	(future event)					
9.-10.11.2018	2018 ICO Speedminton® Latvian Open	(Latvia) Riga	(future event)					
17.-18.11.2018	2018 ICO Speedminton® Spanish Open	(Spain) Las Palmas	(future event)					

* 1000 points tournaments are denoted in bold characters

== Nations Cup ==
Since 2013 the ICO has organized a national team competition called ICO Nations Cup. The concept is derived from tennis competitions like David Cup or Fed Cup, but in crossminton mixed teams consisting of both male and female players are competing. First, Regional tournaments are played in group- or elimination system and then the winners of Regional tournaments – Regional Champions – battle it out for the title of ICO Nations Cup Champion at the Final tournament.

A national team consists of at least three players – 2 male players (open category, but not as a rule) and 1 female player (women's category, but not as a rule) – and not more than five players (3 players + 2 reserves that can step in for either singles or doubles matches). A clash between two national teams consists of 6 matches – 4 singles and 2 doubles matches.

ICO Nations Cup Results
Year	Final Tournament Venue	Champion	Runner-up
2013	(Portugal) Guimaraes	Slovenia	Germany
2014	(Hungary) Budapest	Sweden	Germany
2015	(France) Eragny sur Oise	Slovenia	Germany
2016	(Czech Republic) Brno	Germany	Poland
2017	(Croatia) Zabok	Slovenia	Czech Republic
2018	(Slovenia) Laško	Czech Republic	Slovenia
2019	(Czech Republic) Prague	Germany	Czech Republic
2020	(not played)	(not played)	
2021	(not played)	(not played)	

=== Asian Championship ===
1. 2022: https://crossminton.org/1st-ico-crossminton-asian-championships-2022/
2. 2024: https://crossminton.org/2nd-ico-crossminton-asian-championships-2024/
