= Eric Stach =

American materials scientist

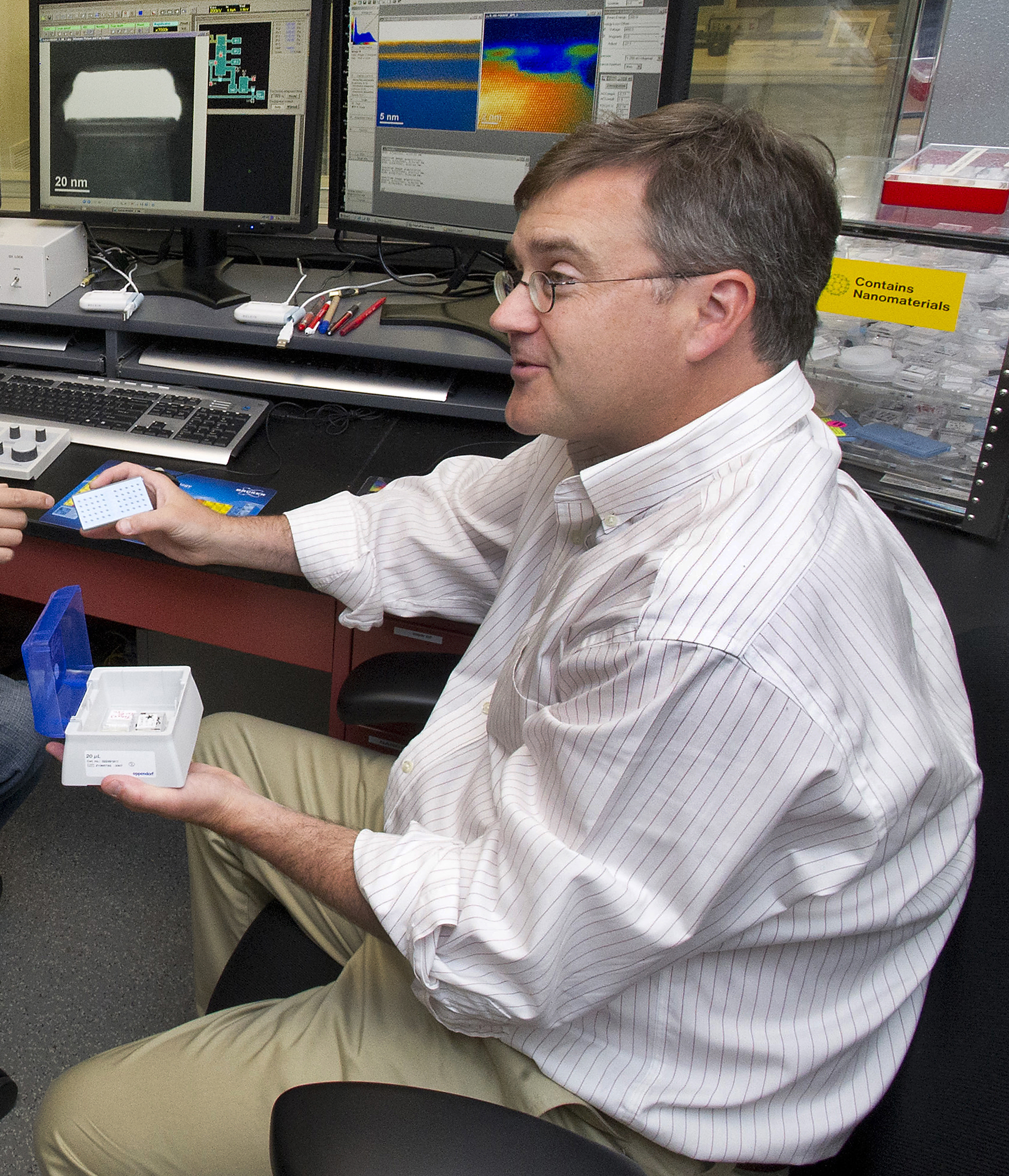
Eric Stach in the Center for Functional Nanomaterials in 2012

Eric Andrew Stach is an American materials scientist who is a professor at the University of Pennsylvania and an elected fellow of both the American Physical Society (for "development and application of in-situ and operando methods in materials research using transmission electron microscopy") and the Microscopy Society of America. He was also awarded the Eli F. Burton Award in 2009. He was named a "Highly Cited Researcher" in the newly established Cross-Field category in 2018.

== Education ==
He earned his B.S. at Duke University in 1992, his M.S. and M.S.E at University of Washington in 1994, his Ph.D. at University of Virginia in 1998, and a Masters of Business Administration from Stony Brook University in 2018.

== Research ==
His interests are materials science and engineering, crystallography, energy storage, heterogeneous catalysis, nanotechnology and he is a specialist in the field of electron microscopy. His highest cited paper "Graphene-based composite materials" has been cited 9570 times, according to Google Scholar.

== Publications ==
- Yanwu Zhu, Shanthi Murali, Meryl D Stoller, KJ Ganesh, Weiwei Cai, Paulo J Ferreira, Adam Pirkle, Robert M Wallace, Katie A Cychosz, Matthias Thommes, Dong Su, Eric A Stach, Rodney S Ruoff. Carbon-based supercapacitors produced by activation of graphene. 332:6037. 1537–1541. Science 2011.
- Qingkai Yu, Luis A Jauregui, Wei Wu, Robert Colby, Jifa Tian, Zhihua Su, Helin Cao, Zhihong Liu, Deepak Pandey, Dongguang Wei, Ting Fung Chung, Peng Peng, Nathan P Guisinger, Eric A Stach, Jiming Bao, Shin-Shem Pei, Yong P Chen. Control and characterization of individual grains and grain boundaries in graphene grown by chemical vapour deposition. 10:6. 443–449. Nature materials. 2011.
- Qijie Guo, Grayson M Ford, Wei-Chang Yang, Bryce C Walker, Eric A Stach, Hugh W Hillhouse, Rakesh Agrawal. Fabrication of 7.2% efficient CZTSSe solar cells using CZTS nanocrystals. 132:49. 17384–17386. Journal of the American Chemical Society. 2010.
- Zhiwei Shan, EA Stach, JMK Wiezorek, JA Knapp, DM Follstaedt, SX Mao. Grain boundary-mediated plasticity in nanocrystalline nickel. 305:5684. 654–657. Science. 2004.
