= Juhani Tamminen (ice hockey, born 1989) =

Finnish ice hockey player

- Born: January 11, 1989 (age 37) Hämeenlinna, Finland
- Height: 6 ft 3 in (191 cm)
- Weight: 194 lb (88 kg; 13 st 12 lb)
- Position: Centre
- Shot: Left
- Played for: FPS; Rovaniemen Kiekko; HIFK; Ilves; Dornbirner EC; Ferencvárosi TC
- Playing career: 2010–2022

Juhani Tamminen (born January 11, 1989) is a Finnish ice hockey player who plays as a centre for Ilves.

== Career statistics ==
			Regular season					Playoffs
Season	Team	League	GP	G	A	Pts	PIM	GP	G	A	Pts	PIM
2004–05	HPK U16	U16 SM-sarja	19	4	1	5	8	—	—	—	—	—
2006–07	HPK U18	U18 SM-sarja	33	12	18	30	18	—	—	—	—	—
2007–08	HPK-T U20	U20 2. Divisioona	15	17	13	30	32	—	—	—	—	—
2008–09	HPK U20 Akatemia	U20 2. Divisioona	14	7	20	27	20	—	—	—	—	—
2009–10	HPK U20 Akatemia	U20 2. Divisioona	24	16	34	50	18	—	—	—	—	—
2010–11	HPK Inkkarit	2. Divisioona	7	3	9	12	0	—	—	—	—	—
2011–12	FPS	Suomi-sarja	36	14	20	34	24	—	—	—	—	—
2012–13	FPS	Suomi-sarja	41	25	48	73	48	—	—	—	—	—
2013–14	FPS	Suomi-sarja	35	17	22	39	16	9	2	6	8	12
2014–15	FPS	Suomi-sarja	34	19	33	52	10	3	1	0	1	27
2015–16	RoKi	Mestis	36	5	13	18	43	—	—	—	—	—
2016–17	RoKi	Mestis	48	15	28	43	44	—	—	—	—	—
2016–17	HIFK	Liiga	3	0	0	0	0	—	—	—	—	—
2017–18	Ilves	Liiga	48	9	13	22	14	—	—	—	—	—
2018–19	Ilves	Liiga	51	4	10	14	30	7	0	2	2	2
2019–20	Dornbirner EC	EBEL	50	8	14	22	32	—	—	—	—	—
2020–21	FPS	Mestis	30	7	18	25	34	—	—	—	—	—
2021–22	Ferencvárosi TC	Erste Liga	32	6	25	31	34	13	6	4	10	6
Liiga totals			102	13	23	36	44	7	0	2	2	2
Mestis totals			114	27	59	86	121	—	—	—	—	—
Suomi-sarja totals			146	75	123	198	98	12	3	6	9	39
