= Jasmina Keber =

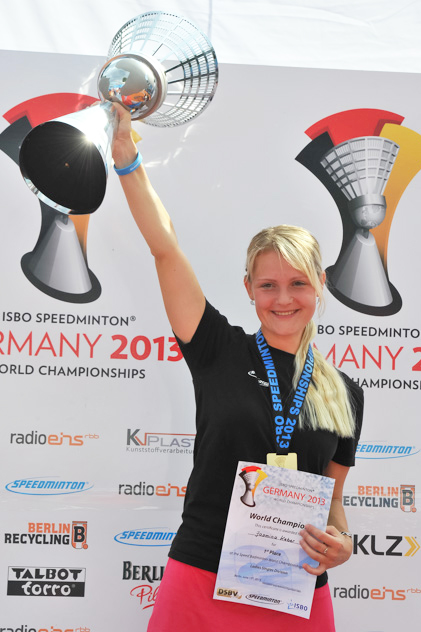

Personal information
- Born: November 26, 1988 (age 37) Kirchheim unter Teck, West Germany
- Height: 1.58 m (5 ft 2 in)

Sport
- Country: Slovenia
- Sport: Badminton
- Handedness: Right-handed (two-handed backhand)
- Highest ranking: 1 (January 2012)
Medal record
Women's crossminton
Representing Slovenia
World Championships
Gold medal – first place	2025 Warsaw	Women
Gold medal – first place	2021 Zagreb	Women's Doubles
Gold medal – first place	2019 Budapest	Women
Gold medal – first place	2015 Berlin	Women
Gold medal – first place	2013 Berlin	Women
Silver medal – second place	2023 Brno	Women
Silver medal – second place	2021 Zagreb	Women
Silver medal – second place	2015 Berlin	Mix Doubles
Silver medal – second place	2011 Berlin	Women
Bronze medal – third place	2025 Warsaw	Mix Doubles
Bronze medal – third place	2023 Brno	Women's Doubles
Bronze medal – third place	2017 Warsaw	Mix Doubles
Bronze medal – third place	2013 Berlin	Mix Doubles
European Championships
Gold medal – first place	2024 Balatonboglár	Women
Gold medal – first place	2024 Balatonboglár	Mix Doubles
Gold medal – first place	2014 Warsaw	Women
Gold medal – first place	2012 Poreč	Women
Silver medal – second place	2014 Warsaw	Mix Doubles
Silver medal – second place	2012 Poreč	Women's Doubles
Bronze medal – third place	2016 Brest	Women
Bronze medal – third place	2016 Brest	Mix Doubles
Bronze medal – third place	2012 Poreč	Mix Doubles
- Updated on 8 July 2024

Jasmina Keber (born November 26, 1988) is a four-time World Champion and triple European Champion crossminton player from Slovenia.

After winning a silver medal at the first ICO Crossminton World Championships in 2011, Jasmina Keber won the European Champion title at the European Championships in 2012, both in female singles category. In 2013, she became World Champion for the first time and in 2014 she successfully defended her European Champion title. In 2015, she successfully defended her World Champion title. Her third World Champion title was won in 2019. In 2021 she won the World Champion title in Women's doubles and finished second in singles, just like she did in 2023, while also winning a bronze medal in Women's doubles. She won her third European Champion title in singles in 2024, paired with a European Champion title in Mixed doubles. In 2025, she won her fourth World Champion title and a bronze medal in Mixed Doubles category.

In January 2012 she became the no. 1 ranked player in the ICO female singles world ranking and in July 2013 she became the no. 1 ranked player in the ICO doubles world ranking too. In the period of 2010-2026 she won 107 singles tournaments (65 ICO World Series and 42 ICO Cup tournaments) and 59 doubles tournaments (34 ICO World Series and 25 ICO Cup tournaments). She currently resides in Radeče, Slovenia.

== Career ==
=== 2019 ===
A slow attempt to return to competitive crossminton started by only playing mixed doubles matches in the first half of the year. In preparation for the World Championships Jasmina Keber won the Austrian Open, after which she won her third World Champion title in Budapest in July. In September, she won Serbian Open and Czech Open, and in November she won Spanish Open.

=== 2018 ===
Jasmina Keber started the 2018 season with a victory at Slovenian Open, followed by a victory at Hungarian Open. A back injury forced her to end the season already in the beginning of May and then also to withdraw from the European Championships.

=== 2017 ===
Following the birth of a daughter, Jasmina Keber returned to playing competitive crossminton by winning Croatian Open in May and Hungarian Open in June. At the World Championships in Warsaw Keber lost in the quarterfinals against Janet Köhler, while in mixed doubles she won bronze medal in pair with Matjaž Šušteršič. In the second part of the year, Keber won the German, Serbian and Mauritian Open.

=== 2016 ===
2016 season started with a victory at Slovenian Open, followed by victories at Polish Open, Croatian Open and Hungarian Open. The highlight of the season was the European Championships in Brest, France, where she finished in 3rd place in both singles and mixed doubles categories after injuring her ankle in the female singles category quarterfinals match. Immediately after the tournament Jasmina Keber announced the end of her season due to pregnancy.

=== 2015 ===
New season brought some tournament mode changes, splitting the World Series tournaments into 1.000 points and 500 points tournaments. Nonetheless, the season started with a victory at Slovenian Open, followed by a defeat in the final of Hungarian Open and victories at Slovak Open and Croatian Open. At the World Championship in Berlin Jasmina Keber won gold in female singles category and silver in mixed doubles category. In October, Slovenian national team, consisting of Jasmina Keber, Samo Lipuscek, Robi Titovsek and Matjaz Sustersic won the ICO Nations Cup Final Tournament in Eragny, France. Victories at Swiss Open and Japanese Open followed in the last two months of the year.

=== 2014 ===
Having suffered only one defeat in singles matches in 2013, 2014 season started with a surprising defeat in the final of Slovenian Open, followed by victories at Hungarian Open, Slovak Open, Dutch Open, Croatian Open and Serbian Open. At European Championship in Warsaw Jasmina Keber won gold in female singles category and silver in mixed doubles category. Another successful season with only one defeat in singles matches was rounded up with a victory at Czech Open.

=== 2013 ===
In January Jasmina Keber won the Slovenian Open for the third consecutive time, which was followed by victories at Hungarian Open in March, French Open and Slovak Open in May, Croatian Open in June, Dutch Open and Ukrainian Open in July and Portuguese Open in September.
World Championships 2013 took place mid-June in Berlin. After winning a bronze medal in mixed doubles in pair with Matjaž Šušteršič, Jasmina Keber secured the title of World Champion in female singles category by winning an incredible final match against Marta Sołtys of Poland, thus achieving the biggest success of her career.
In July, Jasmina Keber became the first player in the history of speed badminton to simultaneously hold the titles of current World Champion, European Champion, No. 1 ranked player in singles and No. 1 ranked player in doubles category.

=== 2012 ===
Another perfect start to new season saw Jasmina Keber take over the number-one spot in the world rankings and repeat the victories at the Slovenian Open, Croatian Open, and Serbian Open. She also added victories at the Slovak Open, Ukrainian Open, and Czech Open to her tally, while finishing second at the Portuguese Open and Swiss Open, thus making a third place at the Hungarian Open her worst result of the year. The 2012 European Championships took place in Poreč, Croatia. As the number-one seeded player in the female category, Jasmina Keber won the final match against Agnes Darnyik from Hungary and the title of European champion. In addition, she finished second in the female doubles category with Helena Halas and third in mixed doubles with Matjaž Šušteršič, thus becoming the most successful female player at the 2012 European Championships.

=== 2011 ===
A perfect start into 2011 season with her maiden victory (Slovenian Open) at ICO World Series tournaments was followed by victories at Serbian Open, Croatian Open and Hungarian Open with only defeat sustained in the final match of Slovak Open against Marta Sołtys from Poland.
The first ICO Crossminton (at that time still named speed badminton) World Championships took place in August at Steffi Graf stadium in Berlin, Germany. As 3rd seeded player she lost a tightly contested final match against Janet Köhler from Germany, thus winning the title of vice-champion of the world.

== World championships ==
=== 2025 - Warsaw (Poland) ===
Result	Category	Surface	Final opponent	Final score	Partner
gold	female singles	hard court	(Japan) Yurina Abe	16:11, 16:14	/
bronze	mixed doubles	hard court	/	/	(Slovenia) Jaša Jovan

=== 2023 - Brno (Czech Republic) ===
Result	Category	Surface	Final opponent	Final score	Partner
silver	female singles	hard court	(Japan) Yurina Abe	8:16, 7:16	/
bronze	women's doubles	hard court	/	/	(Slovenia) Danaja Knez

=== 2021 - Zagreb (Croatia) ===
Result	Category	Surface	Final opponent	Final score	Partner
silver	female singles	hard court	(Japan) Yurina Abe	13:16, 9:16	/
gold	women's doubles	hard court	(Czech Republic) Tereza Hogenova/Tereza Šimkova	16:13, 18:16	(Slovenia) Danaja Knez

=== 2019 - Budapest (Hungary) ===
Result	Category	Surface	Final opponent	Final score
gold	female singles	parquet	(Slovenia) Lori Škerl	16:9, 16:13

=== 2017 - Warsaw (Poland) ===
Result	Category	Surface	Final opponent	Final score	Partner
bronze	mixed doubles	hard court	/	/	(Slovenia) Matjaž Šušteršič

=== 2015 - Berlin (Germany) ===
Result	Category	Surface	Final opponent	Final score	Partner
gold	female singles	hard court	(Germany) Janet Köhler	16:11, 16:13	/
silver	mixed doubles	grass	(Sweden) Rebecca Nielsen/Melker Ekberg	14:16, 13:16	(Slovenia) Matjaž Šušteršič

=== 2013 - Berlin (Germany) ===
Result	Category	Surface	Final opponent	Final score	Partner
gold	female singles	clay	(Poland) Marta Sołtys	13:16, 17:15, 16:14	/
bronze	mixed doubles	clay	/	/	(Slovenia) Matjaž Šušteršič

=== 2011 - Berlin (Germany) ===
Result	Category	Surface	Final opponent	Final score
silver	female singles	clay	(Germany) Janet Köhler	16:18, 13:16

== European Championships ==
=== 2024 - Balatonboglár (Hungary) ===
Result	Category	Surface	Final opponent	Final score	Partner
gold	female singles	clay	(Slovakia) Tamara Lukáčová	16:10, 16:12	/
gold	mixed doubles	clay	(Slovakia) Tamara Lukáčová/Igor Novotný	16:11, 16:6	(Slovenia) Jaša Jovan

=== 2016 - Brest (France) ===
Result	Category	Surface	Final opponent	Final score	Partner
bronze	female singles	hard court	/	/	/
bronze	mixed doubles	hard court	/	/	(Slovenia) Matjaž Šušteršič

=== 2014 - Warsaw (Poland) ===
Result	Category	Surface	Final opponent	Final score	Partner
gold	female singles	clay	(Germany) Jennifer Greune	16:10, 16:9	/
silver	mixed doubles	clay	(Germany) Jennifer Greune/Daniel Gossen	1:16, 11:16	(Slovenia) Matjaž Šušteršič

=== 2012 - Poreč (Croatia) ===
Result	Category	Surface	Final opponent	Final score	Partner
gold	female singles	clay	(Hungary) Agnes Darnyik	16:11, 16:9, 13:16, 16:13	/
silver	female doubles	clay	(Hungary) Agnes Darnyik/Krisztina Bognar	7:16, 9:16, 13:16	(Slovenia) Helena Halas
bronze	mixed doubles	clay	/	/	(Slovenia) Matjaž Šušteršič

== Tournament finals ==
=== Singles ===
ICO World Series

Date	Tournament	Level/points	Surface	Final opponent	Result	Final score
28-01-2011	(Slovenia) Podčetrtek	1.000 pts	parquet	(Slovenia) Helena Halas	won	15:17, 16:10, 16:5
21-05-2011	(Slovakia) Bratislava	1.000 pts	parquet	(Poland) Marta Sołtys	lost	12:16, 15:17
04-06-2011	(Serbia) Belgrade	1.000 pts	parquet	(Slovakia) Barbora Syč-Krivanova	won	16:6, 16:11
18-06-2011	(Croatia) Rijeka	1.000 pts	parquet	(Hungary) Veronika Kunyik	won	16:6, 16:10
24-09-2011	(Hungary) Budapest	1.000 pts	parquet	(Slovakia) Barbora Syč-Krivanova	won	16:8, 16:12
28-01-2012	(Slovenia) Podčetrtek	1.000 pts	parquet	(Slovakia) Barbora Syč-Krivanova	won	16:13, 16:11
14-04-2012	(Croatia) Zagreb	1.000 pts	parquet	(Slovakia) Barbora Syč-Krivanova	won	16:10, 21:19
05-05-2012	(Portugal) Lisbon	1.000 pts	parquet	(Germany) Jennifer Greune	lost	11:16, 16:18
26-05-2012	(Slovakia) Trnava	1.000 pts	hard court	(Hungary) Agnes Darnyik	won	15:17, 16:12, 20:18
09-06-2012	(Serbia) Belgrade	1.000 pts	clay	(Sweden) Rebecca Nielsen	won	16:13, 16:10
28-07-2012	(Ukraine) Uzhhorod	1.000 pts	parquet	(Hungary) Agnes Darnyik	won	16:8, 16:4
15-09-2012	(Czech Republic) Prague	1.000 pts	clay	(Hungary) Krisztina Bognar	won	12:16, 16:7, 16:11
24-11-2012	(Switzerland) Wohlen	1.000 pts	granular court	(Hungary) Agnes Darnyik	lost	14:16, 7:16
27-01-2013	(Slovenia) Podčetrtek	1.000 pts	parquet	(Hungary) Agnes Darnyik	won	16:6, 9:16, 16:10
16-03-2013	(Hungary) Budapest	1.000 pts	parquet	(Hungary) Agnes Darnyik	won	16:11, 16:12
05-05-2013	(France) Paris	1.000 pts	hard court	(Slovakia) Barbora Syč-Krivanova	won	9:16, 16:10, 16:8
19-05-2013	(Slovakia) Trnava	1.000 pts	hard court	(Slovakia) Barbora Syč-Krivanova	won	16:9, 16:12
23-06-2013	(Croatia) Rijeka	1.000 pts	parquet	(Slovakia) Barbora Syč-Krivanova	won	16:10, 16:3
07-07-2013	(Netherlands) Amstelveen	1.000 pts	carpet	(Germany) Ellen Martins Rodrigues	won	16:4, 16:13
27-07-2013	(Ukraine) Uzhhorod	1.000 pts	parquet	(Slovakia) Barbora Syč-Krivanova	won	16:5, 16:12
14-09-2013	(Portugal) Guimaraes	1.000 pts	parquet	(Germany) Jennifer Greune	won	16:6, 16:8
26-01-2014	(Slovenia) Podčetrtek	1.000 pts	parquet	(Hungary) Agnes Darnyik	lost	13:16, 16:6, 15:17
23-03-2014	(Hungary) Budapest	1.000 pts	clay	(Hungary) Agnes Darnyik	won	16:5, 16:4
06-04-2014	(Slovakia) Trnava	1.000 pts	hard court	(Slovakia) Barbora Syč-Krivanova	won	14:16, 16:7, 16:8
18-05-2014	(Netherlands) Amstelveen	1.000 pts	carpet	(Germany) Susanne Weckop	won	16:3, 16:7
01-06-2014	(Croatia) Zagreb	1.000 pts	parquet	(Hungary) Krisztina Bognar	won	16:6, 16:10
07-06-2014	(Serbia) Belgrade	1.000 pts	clay	(Hungary) Agnes Darnyik	won	16:8, 16:3
07-09-2014	(Czech Republic) Prague	1.000 pts	clay	(Sweden) Rebecca Nielsen	won	16:11, 16:5
31-01-2015	(Slovenia) Podčetrtek	500 pts	parquet	(Hungary) Agnes Darnyik	won	16:12, 16:3
22-03-2015	(Hungary) Budapest	1.000 pts	artif. grass	(Hungary) Agnes Darnyik	lost	12:16, 16:11, 9:16
28-03-2015	(Slovakia) Banska Bystrica	500 pts	hard court	(Slovakia) Barbora Syč-Krivanova	won	16:8, 16:14
14-06-2015	(Croatia) Zagreb	1.000 pts	hard court	(Hungary) Nora Gaal	won	16:7, 16:11
15-11-2015	(Switzerland) Arlesheim	1.000 pts	parquet	(Slovenia) Danaja Knez	won	16:7, 16:6
13-12-2015	(Japan) Tokyo	500 pts	parquet	(Japan) Aya Udagawa	won	16:12, 16:7
06-02-2016	(Slovenia) Podčetrtek	1.000 pts	parquet	(Hungary) Agnes Darnyik	won	16:12, 17:19, 16:7
09-04-2016	(Poland) Warsaw	1.000 pts	hard court	(Sweden) Rebecca Nielsen	won	21:19, 16:8
29-05-2016	(Croatia) Zagreb	1.000 pts	hard court	(Poland) Marta Urbanik	won	16:9, 16:11
04-06-2016	(Hungary) Budapest	1.000 pts	clay/hard court	(Hungary) Agnes Darnyik	won	16:8, 16:12
06-05-2017	(Croatia) Zagreb	500 pts	hard court	(Croatia) Paula Barković	won	16:10, 16:10
04-06-2017	(Hungary) Kiskunfelegyhaza	1.000 pts	hard court	(Latvia) Santa Paegle	won	16:9, 16:6
10-09-2017	(Germany) Fürstenfeldbruck	1.000 pts	parquet	(Slovenia) Danaja Knez	won	16:5, 16:10
15-10-2017	(Serbia) Sombor	500 pts	clay	(Slovenia) Lori Škerl	won	16:12, 16:11
03-12-2017	(Mauritius) Curepipe	500 pts	hard court	(Slovenia) Lori Škerl	won	16:13, 16:8
18-03-2018	(Slovenia) Laško	1.000 pts	hard court	(Slovenia) Lori Škerl	won	16:5, 16:10
29-04-2018	(Hungary) Kiskunfelegyhaza	1.000 pts	hard court	(Hungary) Agnes Darnyik	won	14:16, 16:6, 16:14
30-06-2019	(Austria) Vienna	500 pts	clay	(Germany) Andrea Horn	won	16:9, 16:10
15-09-2019	(Serbia) Sombor	500 pts	clay	(Slovenia) Danaja Knez	won	16:6, 16:11
29-09-2019	(Czech Republic) Brno	1.000 pts	hard court	(Poland) Marta Urbanik	won	16:12, 16:13
17-11-2019	(Spain) Gran Canaria	500 pts	parquet	(Germany) Anja Rolfes	won	16:12, 16:9
27-06-2021	(Croatia) Zagreb	500 pts	plastic	(Slovenia) Danaja Knez	won	16:8, 16:8
03-07-2021	(Hungary) Albertirsa	500 pts	parquet	(Slovakia) Tamara Lukačova	won	16:14, 16:11
28-08-2021	(Croatia) Poreč	500 pts	clay	(Slovenia) Danaja Knez	won	16:6, 16:13
05-09-2021	(Slovenia) Radeče	500 pts	parquet	(Germany) Anna Hubert	won	16:18, 16:10, 16:12
11-09-2021	(Serbia) Sombor	500 pts	clay	(Hungary) Krisztina Bognar	won	16:7, 16:12
14-05-2022	(Slovenia) Ljubljana	500 pts	carpet	(Croatia) Nika Miškulin	won	16:10, 16:14
25-06-2022	(Slovenia) Radeče	500 pts	parquet	(Latvia) Agnese Logoša	won	16:5, 16:7
22-10-2023	(Spain) Vélez-Málaga	500 pts	parquet	(Latvia) Agate Kristiana Spare	won	16:14, 16:6
02-04-2024	(India) Noida	500 pts	asphalt	(Slovenia) Nejka Čater	won	16:5, 16:4
20-04-2024	(Hungary) Solt	500 pts	parquet	(Slovakia) Katarína Daduľáková	won	16:6, 16:8
24-08-2024	(Croatia) Poreč	500 pts	clay	(Hungary) Veronika Kunyik	won	16:4, 16:5
07-09-2024	(Slovenia) Trbovlje	500 pts	carpet	(Croatia) Nika Miškulin	won	16:10, 16:8
14-09-2024	(Serbia) Sombor	500 pts	clay	(Croatia) Nika Miškulin	won	16:9, 16:5
05-10-2024	(Croatia) Donja Stubica	500 pts	parquet	(Slovenia) Eva Župevc	won	4:16, 16:9, 16:6
13-10-2024	(Netherlands) Arnhem	1.000 pts	hard court	(Germany) Anna Hubert	won	16:14, 16:13
17-11-2024	(Latvia) Riga	1.000 pts	carpet	(Latvia) Agnese Logoša	lost	retired/injury
02-03-2025	(Slovakia) Košice	1.000 pts	hard court	(Latvia) Agate Kristiana Spare	won	16:9, 16:6
13-04-2025	(Slovenia) Ljubljana	1.000 pts	clay	(Germany) Anna Hubert	won	16:13, 16:9
26-04-2025	(Hungary) Solt	500 pts	parquet	(Slovakia) Katarína Daduľáková	won	16:7, 16:11
06-07-2025	(Croatia) Varaždin	1.000 pts	parquet	(Slovakia) Katarína Daduľáková	won	16:4, 16:9
26-07-2025	(Hungary) Kiskunhalas	500 pts	sand	(Slovenia) Eva Župevc	won	16:5, 16:7
02-11-2025	(Maldives) Fulidhoo	500 pts	sand	(Maldives) Fathimath Luyoona	won	16:3, 16:2

Cup tournaments

Date	Tournament	Surface	Final opponent	Result
26-06-2010	(Slovenia) Radeče	parquet/asphalt	(Slovenia) Urška Kolenc	won
10-01-2011	(Slovakia) Detva	parquet	(Slovakia) Daniela Klinčakova	won
19-02-2011	(Slovenia) Kranj	parquet	(Slovenia) Helena Halas	won
02-04-2011	(Poland) Brzeszcze	parquet	(Poland) Marta Sołtys	won
25-06-2011	(Slovenia) Radeče	parquet	(Slovenia) Helena Halas	lost
26-06-2011	(Croatia) Zagreb	asphalt	(Slovenia) Katarina Turk	won
06-08-2011	(Slovenia) Bohinj	parquet	(Slovenia) Helena Halas	won
20-08-2011	(Croatia) Fužine	asphalt	(Croatia) Ana Trampetić	won
25-02-2012	(Croatia) Zagreb	parquet	(Hungary) Krisztina Bognar	won
19-05-2012	(Slovenia) Trbovlje	parquet	(Slovenia) Helena Halas	won
23-06-2012	(Slovenia) Radeče	parquet/asphalt	(Slovenia) Helena Halas	won
14-07-2012	(Croatia) Ičići	sand	(Croatia) Tea Grofelnik	won
04-08-2012	(Slovenia) Bohinj	grass	(Slovenia) Nina Jazbinšek	won
13-10-2012	(Croatia) Zagreb	clay	(Hungary) Agnes Darnyik	won
17-11-2012	(Slovenia) Ptuj	parquet	(Slovenia) Katarina Turk	won
06-04-2013	(Slovenia) Radeče	parquet	(Hungary) Eszter Horvath	won
13-07-2013	(Croatia) Ičići	sand	(Hungary) Agnes Darnyik	won
10-08-2013	(Slovenia) Bohinj	grass	(Hungary) Nora Gaal	won
28-09-2013	(Slovenia) Trbovlje	parquet	(Hungary) Eszter Horvath	won
03-11-2013	(Brazil) São Paulo	parquet	(Brazil) Sandra Sorpreso	won
27-09-2014	(Slovenia) Trbovlje	parquet	(Hungary) Beata Fenyvesy	won
25-04-2015	(Croatia) Porec	clay	(Hungary) Agnes Darnyik	won
26-09-2015	(Slovenia) Trbovlje	parquet	(Hungary) Nora Gaal	won
18-06-2016	(Slovenia) Radece	parquet/asphalt	(Slovenia) Danaja Knez	won
26-08-2017	(Croatia) Pula	artificial grass	(Slovenia) Danaja Knez	won
28-11-2017	(Slovenia) Radece	parquet	(Slovenia) Rebeka Škerl	won
03-03-2018	(Croatia) Zagreb	parquet	(Slovenia) Lori Škerl	won
21-09-2019	(Slovenia) Trbovlje	parquet	(Slovenia) Danaja Knez	won
29-08-2020	(Slovenia) Radeče	parquet	(Slovenia) Pika Rogelj	won
24-04-2021	(Croatia) Zagreb	artificial grass	(Croatia) Gala Zukić	won
31-07-2021	(Hungary) Kiskunhalas	sand	(Serbia) Alida Jerković	won
06-11-2021	(Croatia) Opatija	parquet	(Croatia) Nika Miškulin	won
26-02-2022	(Hungary) Solt	parquet	(Slovakia) Tamara Lukačova	won
26-03-2022	(Croatia) Zagreb	artificial grass	(Slovenia) Danaja Knez	won
22-05-2022	(Spain) Las Palmas	parquet	(Spain) Raquel Diaz Santana	won
28-05-2022	(Croatia) Zabok	parquet	(Serbia) Alida Jerković	won
27-05-2023	(Croatia) Zabok	parquet	(Croatia) Nika Miškulin	won
24-02-2024	(Croatia) Zagreb	parquet	(Croatia) Nika Miškulin	won
21-09-2024	(Croatia) Varaždin	parquet	(Croatia) Nika Miškulin	won
22-02-2025	(Croatia) Zagreb	parquet	(Slovenia) Eva Župevc	won
21-06-2025	(Slovenia) Radeče	parquet	(Slovenia) Tija Bervar	won
20-06-2026	(Slovenia) Radeče	parquet	(Slovenia) Eva Župevc	won

Cup tournaments - Open division

Date	Tournament	Surface	Final opponent	Result
21-06-2014	(Slovenia) Radeče	parquet/asphalt	(Slovenia) Robi Titovšek	lost
13-09-2014	(Croatia) Krapina	parquet	(Hungary) Gergely Racz	won
19-06-2015	(Slovenia) Radeče	parquet	(Slovenia) Robi Titovšek	injury loss

=== Doubles ===
ICO World Series

Date	Tournament	Level/points	Surface	Partner	Category	Final opponents	Result	Final score
09-06-2012	(Serbia) Beograd	1.000 pts	clay	(Slovenia) Matjaž Šušteršič	all pairs	(Sweden) Per Hjalmarson/Mattias Aronsson	lost	6:16, 14:16
27-01-2013	(Slovenia) Podčetrtek	1.000 pts	parquet	(Slovenia) Matjaž Šušteršič	all pairs	(Slovenia) Robi Titovšek/Samo Lipušček	lost	13:16, 15:17
23-06-2013	(Croatia) Rijeka	1.000 pts	parquet	(Slovenia) Matjaž Šušteršič	all pairs	(Slovenia) Robi Titovšek/Samo Lipušček	lost	13:16, 16:13, 7:16
07-07-2013	(Netherlands) Amstelveen	1.000 pts	carpet	(Slovenia) Matjaž Šušteršič	mixed pairs	(Germany) Ellen Martins Rodrigues/Sönke Kaatz	lost	10:16, 19:21
27-07-2013	(Ukraine) Uzhhorod	1.000 pts	parquet	(Slovenia) Matjaž Šušteršič	all pairs	(Hungary) Gergely Racz/Laszlo Racz	won	12:16, 17:15, 17:15
14-09-2013	(Portugal) Guimaraes	1.000 pts	parquet	(Slovenia) Matjaž Šušteršič	all pairs	(Germany) Patrick Schüsseler/Robin Joop	lost	8:16, 8:16
18-05-2014	(Netherlands) Amstelveen	1.000 pts	carpet	(Slovenia) Matjaž Šušteršič	mixed pairs	(Germany) Susanne Weckop/Michael von Lennep	won	16:9, 16:13
31-05-2014	(Croatia) Zagreb	1.000 pts	parquet	(Slovenia) Matjaž Šušteršič	mixed pairs	(Slovakia) Henrieta Syč-Krivanova/Jan Ščavnicky	won	16:7, 16:8
07-06-2014	(Serbia) Beograd	1.000 pts	clay	(Slovenia) Matjaž Šušteršič	all pairs	(Ukraine) Myhailo Mandryk / (Slovakia) Jan Ščavnicky	lost	15:17, 7:16
07-09-2014	(Czech Republic) Prague	1.000 pts	clay	(Slovenia) Matjaž Šušteršič	mixed pairs	(Germany) Anna Borek/Julien Soos	lost	14:16, 18:20
31-01-2015	(Slovenia) Podčetrtek	500 pts	parquet	(Slovenia) Matjaž Šušteršič	mixed pairs	(Hungary) Agnes Darnyik/Tamas Dozsa	won	8:16, 16:14, 16:12
22-03-2015	(Hungary) Budapest	1.000 pts	artific. grass	(Slovenia) Matjaž Šušteršič	mixed pairs	(Germany) Anna Borek/Julien Soos	won	16:13, 19:17
28-03-2015	(Slovakia) Banska Bystrica	500 pts	hard court	(Slovenia) Matjaž Šušteršič	mixed pairs	(Slovenia) Danaja Knez / (Sweden) Melker Ekberg	lost	8:16, 13:16
13-06-2015	(Croatia) Zagreb	1.000 pts	hard court	(Slovenia) Matjaž Šušteršič	mixed pairs	(Hungary) Edit Veresne Osvay/Gergely Racz	won	16:6, 18:16
11-12-2015	(Japan) Tokyo	500 pts	parquet	(Slovenia) Matjaž Šušteršič	mixed pairs	(Japan) Yuka Aketa/Akihiko Nishimura	lost	16:13, 18:20, 14:16
07-02-2016	(Slovenia) Podčetrtek	1.000 pts	parquet	(Germany) Patrick Schüsseler	all pairs	(Hungary) Gergely Racz/Laszlo Racz	won	16:10, 16:14
29-05-2016	(Croatia) Zagreb	1.000 pts	hard court	(Slovenia) Matjaž Šušteršič	mixed pairs	(Slovenia) Lori Škerl/Jaša Jovan	won	16:12, 16:14
06-05-2017	(Croatia) Zagreb	500 pts	hard court	(Slovenia) Matjaž Šušteršič	mixed pairs	(Croatia) Paula Barković/Nikola Kučina	won	16:7, 16:10
10-09-2017	(Germany) Fürstenfeldbruck	1.000 pts	parquet	(Slovenia) Matjaž Šušteršič	mixed pairs	(Slovenia) Lori Škerl/Jaša Jovan	lost	14:16, 16:11, 13:16
15-10-2017	(Serbia) Sombor	500 pts	clay	(Slovenia) Matjaž Šušteršič	mixed pairs	(Croatia) Paula Barković/Nikola Kučina	lost	13:16, 16:14, 11:16
03-12-2017	(Mauritius) Curepipe	500 pts	hard court	(Slovenia) Matjaž Šušteršič	all pairs	(Mauritius) Daniel Mourat/Giovanni Crouche	won	16:8, 16:5
18-03-2018	(Slovenia) Laško	1.000 pts	hard court	(Slovenia) Matjaž Šušteršič	mixed pairs	(Slovakia) Kristina Ščavnička/Jan Ščavničky	won	16:12, 13:16, 16:12
29-04-2018	(Hungary) Kiskunfelegyhaza	1.000 pts	hard court	(Slovenia) Matjaž Šušteršič	mixed pairs	(Slovenia) Lori Škerl/Jaša Jovan	won	16:13, 16:3
05-05-2018	(Croatia) Zagreb	500 pts	hard court	(Slovenia) Matjaž Šušteršič	mixed pairs	(Serbia) Alida Jerković/Boris Jerković	won	16:6, 16:10
27-04-2019	(Croatia) Zagreb	500 pts	hard court	(Slovenia) Matjaž Šušteršič	mixed pairs	(Croatia) Paula Barković/Nikola Kučina	lost	16:13, 13:16, 12:16
15-09-2019	(Serbia) Sombor	500 pts	clay	(Slovenia) Matjaž Šušteršič	mixed pairs	(Slovenia) Danaja Knez/Jaša Jovan	won	16:14, 16:9
29-09-2019	(Czech Republic) Brno	1.000 pts	hard court	(Germany) Sönke Kaatz	mixed pairs	(Hungary) Edit Osvay/Pal Padar	won	16:14, 16:8
17-11-2019	(Spain) Gran Canaria	500 pts	parquet	(Slovenia) Matjaž Šušteršič	mixed pairs	(Hungary) Krisztina Takacs / (Netherlands) Marcel van der Laan	won	16:7, 16:4
27-06-2021	(Croatia) Zagreb	500 pts	plastic	(Slovenia) Matjaž Šušteršič	mixed pairs	(Slovenia) Danaja Knez / (Germany) Adrian Lutz	won	16:9, 15:17, 16:6
03-07-2021	(Hungary) Albertirsa	500 pts	parquet	(Slovenia) Matjaž Šušteršič	mixed pairs	(Hungary) Edit Osvay/Pal Padar	lost	11:16, 16:11, 14:16
28-08-2021	(Croatia) Poreč	500 pts	clay	(Slovenia) Matjaž Šušteršič	mixed pairs	(Croatia) Laura Jagečić / (Norway) Erik Damstuen Brandt	won	15:17, 16:8, 16:3
05-09-2021	(Slovenia) Radeče	500 pts	parquet	(Slovenia) Matjaž Šušteršič	mixed pairs	(Hungary) Edit Osvay/Pal Padar	won	16:11, 16:10
11-09-2021	(Serbia) Sombor	500 pts	clay	(Slovenia) Matjaž Šušteršič	mixed pairs	(Serbia) Alida Jerković/Boris Jerković	won	16:11, 16:8
14-05-2022	(Slovenia) Ljubljana	500 pts	carpet	(Slovenia) Matjaž Šušteršič	mixed pairs	(Hungary) Kitti Dosa-Racz/Oliver Vincze	won	16:14, 15:17, 11:16 (RR)
25-06-2022	(Slovenia) Radeče	500 pts	parquet	(Slovenia) Alen Baumkirher	mixed pairs	(Slovenia) Danaja Knez/Jaša Jovan	won	16:9, 17:19, 16:8
03-06-2023	(Hungary) Solt	500 pts	parquet	(Slovenia) Eva Župevc	all pairs	(Hungary) Marcell Kovacs/David Kozari	lost	10:16, 17:15, 8:16
22-10-2023	(Spain) Vélez-Málaga	500 pts	parquet	(Slovenia) Matjaž Šušteršič	mixed pairs	(France) Eva Sacilotto/Jean-Sebastien Velasco	won	16:13, 12:16, 17:15
02-04-2024	(India) Noida	500 pts	asphalt	(Slovenia) Matjaž Šušteršič	mixed pairs	(Slovenia) Nejka Čater/Rok Hudoklin	won	16:6, 16:9
20-04-2024	(Hungary) Solt	500 pts	parquet	(Slovenia) Jaša Jovan	all pairs	(Slovakia) Katarína Daduľáková/Vladimir Pjecha	won	16:13, 16:6
08-06-2024	(Slovenia) Radeče	500 pts	parquet	(Slovenia) Jaša Jovan	mixed pairs	(Serbia) Alida Jerković/Boris Jerković	won	16:6, 16:5
07-09-2024	(Slovenia) Trbovlje	500 pts	carpet	(Slovenia) Jaša Jovan	all pairs	(Slovenia) Danaja Knez/Tilen Knez	won	16:7, 16:5
05-10-2024	(Croatia) Donja Stubica	500 pts	parquet	(Slovenia) Matjaž Šušteršič	all pairs	(Croatia) Nika Miškulin/Damir Baković	won	16:9, 16:5
13-10-2024	(Netherlands) Arnhem	1.000 pts	hard court	(Slovenia) Matjaž Šušteršič	mixed pairs	(Poland) Marta Urbanik / (France) Jean-Sebastien Velasco	won	16:4, 16:10
17-11-2024	(Latvia) Riga	1.000 pts	carpet	(Slovenia) Jaša Jovan	mixed pairs	(Germany) Anna Hubert/Sönke Kaatz	lost	18:20, 16:10, 8:16
02-03-2025	(Slovakia) Košice	1.000 pts	hard court	(Slovenia) Jaša Jovan	mixed pairs	(Poland) Marta Urbanik / Wojciech Wilkosz	won	16:10, 16:9
13-04-2025	(Slovenia) Ljubljana	1.000 pts	clay	(Slovenia) Jaša Jovan	mixed pairs	(Germany) Anna Hubert / (France) Jean-Sebastien Velasco	won	16:12, 16:14
26-04-2025	(Hungary) Solt	500 pts	parquet	(Slovenia) Eva Župevc	womens' pairs	(Hungary) Márta Huczek-Vízkeleti/Anikó Hodonickiné Andrási	won	16:5, 16:4
06-07-2025	(Croatia) Varaždin	1.000 pts	parquet	(Slovenia) Jaša Jovan	mixed pairs	(Slovakia) Katarína Daduľáková/Viliam Kopilec	won	16:7, 16:13
26-07-2025	(Hungary) Kiskunhalas	500 pts	sand	(Slovenia) Eva Župevc	all pairs	(Hungary) Dávid Takács/Attila Takács	won	16:14, 23:21

Cup tournaments

Date	Tournament	Surface	Partner	Category	Final opponents	Result
25-02-2012	(Croatia) Zagreb	parquet	(Slovenia) Matjaž Šušteršič	all pairs	(Hungary) Peter Vincze/Gabor Revesz	lost
28-09-2013	(Slovenia) Trbovlje	parquet	(Slovenia) Matjaž Šušteršič	all pairs	(Hungary) Eszter Horvath/Gabor Revesz	won
03-11-2013	(Brazil) São Paulo	parquet	(Slovenia) Matjaž Šušteršič	mixed pairs	(Brazil) Carolina Naltchadjian/Marco Oliveira	won
30-11-2013	(Slovenia) Ptuj	parquet	(Slovenia) Matjaž Šušteršič	all pairs	(Slovenia) Robi Titovšek/Samo Lipušček	lost
21-06-2014	(Slovenia) Radeče	parquet	(Slovenia) Matjaž Šušteršič	all pairs	(Slovenia) Bojan Jerman/Alen Baumkirher	won
13-09-2014	(Croatia) Krapina	parquet	(Slovenia) Matjaž Šušteršič	all pairs	(Hungary) Ferenc Kiss/Gyula Toth	won
27-09-2014	(Slovenia) Trbovlje	parquet	(Slovenia) Matjaž Šušteršič	all pairs	(Hungary) Oliver Vincze/Karoly Vincze	won
25-04-2015	(Croatia) Poreč	clay	(Slovenia) Matjaž Šušteršič	all pairs	(Hungary) Agnes Darnyik/Tamas Dozsa	won
19-06-2015	(Slovenia) Radeče	parquet	(Slovenia) Matjaž Šušteršič	all pairs	(Slovenia) Lori Škerl/Jaša Jovan	won
26-09-2015	(Slovenia) Trbovlje	parquet	(Slovenia) Matjaž Šušteršič	all pairs	(Slovenia) Silvo Vidmar/Alen Baumkirher	won
27-02-2016	(Croatia) Zagreb	parquet	(Slovenia) Matjaž Šušteršič	all pairs	(Slovenia) Danaja Knez/Jaša Jovan	lost
10-06-2017	(Serbia) Sombor	grass	(Slovenia) Matjaž Šušteršič	mixed pairs	(Slovenia) Danaja Knez/Jaša Jovan	lost
26-08-2017	(Croatia) Pula	artificial grass	(Slovenia) Matjaž Šušteršič	mixed pairs	(Slovenia) Danaja Knez/Jaša Jovan	lost
18-11-2017	(Slovenia) Radeče	parquet	(Slovenia) Matjaž Šušteršič	mixed pairs	(Croatia) Zrinka Jagečić / (Switzerland) Severin Wirth	won
03-03-2018	(Croatia) Zagreb	parquet	(Slovenia) Matjaž Šušteršič	mixed pairs	(Croatia) Paula Barković/Nikola Kučina	won
02-03-2019	(Croatia) Zagreb	clay	(Slovenia) Matjaž Šušteršič	mixed pairs	(Croatia) Laura Jagečić / (Hungary) Oliver Vincze	won
22-06-2019	(Slovenia) Radeče	parquet	(Slovenia) Matjaž Šušteršič	all pairs	(Slovenia) Alen Baumkirher/Bojan Jerman	won
21-09-2019	(Slovenia) Trbovlje	parquet	(Slovenia) Matjaž Šušteršič	mixed pairs	(Croatia) Gala Zukić/Vedran Ružić	won
24-04-2021	(Croatia) Zagreb	artificial grass	(Slovenia) Matjaž Šušteršič	mixed pairs	(Croatia) Gala Zukić/Damir Baković	won
31-07-2021	(Hungary) Kiskunhalas	sand	(Slovenia) Matjaž Šušteršič	mixed pairs	(Serbia) Alida Jerković/Boris Jerković	won
26-02-2022	(Hungary) Solt	parquet	(Slovenia) Matjaž Šušteršič	mixed pairs	(Hungary) Kitti Dosa-Racz/Oliver Vincze	won
22-05-2022	(Spain) Las Palmas	parquet	(Slovenia) Matjaž Šušteršič	mixed pairs	(Spain) Elena Afonso Falcon/Daniel Robles Rodriguez	won
28-05-2022	(Croatia) Zabok	parquet	(Slovenia) Matjaž Šušteršič	mixed pairs	(Serbia) Alida Jerković/Boris Jerković	won
27-05-2023	(Croatia) Zabok	parquet	(Slovenia) Matjaž Šušteršič	all pairs	(Croatia) Nika Miškulin/Damir Baković	won
17-06-2023	(Slovenia) Radeče	parquet	(Slovenia) Danaja Knez	all pairs	(Slovenia) Matjaž Šušteršič/Andrej Šušteršič	won
24-02-2024	(Croatia) Zagreb	parquet	(Slovenia) Matjaž Šušteršič	mixed pairs	(Croatia) Daniela Zdeličan/Damir Baković	won
21-09-2024	(Croatia) Varaždin	parquet	(Slovenia) Matjaž Šušteršič	mixed pairs	(Croatia) Nika Miškulin/Damir Baković	won
22-02-2025	(Croatia) Zagreb	parquet	(Slovenia) Matjaž Šušteršič	mixed pairs	(Croatia) Martina Gorički/Nebojša Aleksić	won
21-06-2025	(Slovenia) Radeče	parquet	(Slovenia) Matjaž Šušteršič	mixed pairs	(Croatia) Nika Gorički / (Slovenia) Kristjan Dolinšek	won
20-06-2026	(Slovenia) Radeče	parquet	(Slovenia) Matjaž Šušteršič	all pairs	(Slovenia) Žak Kolenc/Dejan Kuselj	won
