= Blair Macaulay =

Canadian ice hockey player

- Born: June 27, 1988 (age 38) Winnipeg, Manitoba, Canada
- Height: 5 ft 11 in (180 cm)
- Weight: 179 lb (81 kg; 12 st 11 lb)
- Position: Right wing
- Shoots: Right
- CHL team Former teams: Tulsa Oilers; Bakersfield Condors
- NHL draft: Undrafted
- Playing career: 2013–present

Blair Macaulay (born June 27, 1988) is a Canadian ice hockey player. He currently plays for the Tulsa Oilers in the Central Hockey League (CHL).

For his outstanding play during the 2012-13 season, Macaulay was selected as the CIS West men's hockey most valuable player for the second straight year, and was also named to the CIS All-Canadian First Team.

On September 4, 2013, the Bakersfield Condors of the ECHL announced that brothers Blair and Scott Macaulay were both signed to play the 2013–14 season. After just 1 game with the Condors, Macaulay was released and moved to the CHL with the Tulsa Oilers, alongside Scott.

== Awards and honours ==
Award	Year
CIS (West) Most Valuable Player	2011–12
CIS (West) Most Valuable Player	2012–13
CIS First-Team All-Canadian	2012–13
