= Jiming Bao =

Chinese physicist

Jiming Bao is a Chinese physicist.

Bao studied physics at Zhejiang University, where he earned his bachelor's and master's degrees. He then completed a doctorate in applied physics at the University of Michigan. Bao teaches at the University of Houston. In 2018, Bao was elected a fellow of the Optical Society of America. In 2019, he was granted an equivalent honor by the American Physical Society, "[f]or the discovery of photoacoustic laser streaming, for seminal contributions to the understanding of basic electronic and optical properties of nanostructured materials, and the development of new nanomaterials for applications in solar energy conversions and optoelectronic devices."
