= Budapest Jégkorong Akadémia HC =

Hungarian ice hockey club

Budapest Jégkorong Akadémia Hockey Club
- City: Budapest, Hungary
- League: Erste Liga & OB I Bajnokság
- Founded: 2015; 11 years ago
- Home arena: Vasas Jégcentrum
- Colours: Blue, yellow, white
- Head coach: Balázs Kangyal
- Affiliates: Ferencvárosi TC
- Website: Official website

Franchise history
- 2015–2018: MAC Budapest
- 2018–2020: MAC Újbuda
- 2020–2022: MAC HKB Újbuda
- 2022–: Budapest Jégkorong Akadémia HC

Championships
- OB I Bajnokság: 2018, 2025
- Hungarian Cup: 2017, 2023
- Erste Liga: 2018

Budapest Jégkorong Akadémia Hockey Club (lit. 'Budapest Ice Hockey Academy Hockey Club'), previously known as MAC HKB Újbuda, MAC Újbuda, and MAC Budapest, is a Hungarian ice hockey club in the multi-national Erste Liga and in the OB I Bajnokság, the Hungarian national championship league. They play in Budapest, Hungary at the Vasas Jégcentrum.

== History ==
In their first year of competition they would finish second in the regular season, and would reach the league finals, being swept in 4 games by DVTK Jegesmedvék. In their second season MAC would once again finish the regular season in 2nd place. They won their first playoff series 4-1 over Fehérvári Titanok, as well as their second over Debreceni HK in the semi-final 4-1. In the final they would be swept four games to one by the defending champions DVTK Jegesmedvék to once again finish in second place overall.

MAC Budapest won both the Erste Liga championship and the Hungarian championship in 2018.

The newly renamed MAC Újbuda joined the Slovak Extraliga during the 2018–19 season and 2019–20 season.

The team returned to the Erste Liga ahead of the 2020–21 season under the name MAC HKB Újbuda.

== Arena ==
Vasas Jégcentrum (lit. 'Vasas Ice Center') has served as the Budapest Jégkorong Akadémia HC home venue since 2022.

Prior to the relocation, the team spent seven seasons playing at Tüskecsarnok on the 'Buda' side of Budapest.

== Team ==
=== 2025–26 roster ===
As of 3 March 2026

No.	Nat	Player	Pos	S/G	Age	Acquired	Birthplace
1	(Hungary)	Dániel Péter Kiss	G	L	20	2024	Budapest
5	(Hungary)	Arnold Sándor Varga	D	L	34	2024	Dunaújváros
6	(Hungary)	Gergő Szivák	D	L	19	2024	Budapest
8	(Hungary)	Bence Szabó	D	L	28	2022	Székesfehérvár
9	(Russia)	Valentin Razumnyak	RW	R	29	2025	Magnitogorsk, Russia
14	(Hungary)	Tamás Pozsgai	D	L	38	2015	Dunaújváros
15	(Hungary)	Bence Jurkovics	D	R	21	2025	Budapest
16	(Hungary)	Gergő Dániel Nagy	C	L	36	2024	Dunaújváros
26	(Czech Republic)	Jiří Říha	D	R	33	2025	Opočno, Czechoslovakia
27	(Czech Republic)	Antonín Honejsek	RW	L	34	2025	Prostějov, Czechoslovakia
28	(Hungary)	Dániel Szabó	D	R	30	2024	Székesfehérvár
39	(Hungary)	Attila Marton	G	L	20	2024	Budapest
39	(Hungary)	Ákos Daradics	G	L	20	2024	Budapest
40	(Hungary)	Péter Kornyilov	D	L	17	2025	Budapest
40	(Hungary)	Márton Olivér Nádasy	RW	L	22	2025	Budapest
50	(Hungary)	Boldizsár Péter Dobos	RW	L	20	2025	Budapest
50	(Canada)	Drake Allan Robert Pilon	RW	R	27	2025	Sault Ste. Marie, Canada
50	(Hungary)	Máté Seregély (L)	D	L	26	2025	Budapest
52	(Hungary)	Bálint Horváth	C	L	27	2025	Győr
60	(Hungary)	Barnabás Szamel	D	L	19	2025	Budapest
67	(Hungary)	Bálint Molnár	LW	R	24	2020	Budapest
68	(Hungary)	Dániel Zsolt Zimányi	LW	L	20	2024	Budapest
71	(Hungary)	Nándor Vilmos Banga	LW	L	23	2025	Budapest
74	(Hungary)	Márk Weidemann	C	L	22	2022	Budapest
75	(Hungary)	Dániel László Boros	D	L	29	2024	Budapest
81	(Hungary)	Roland Farkas	G	L	24	2020	Budapest
87	(Hungary)	Levente Keresztes	RW	L	24	2023	Budapest
88	(Hungary)	Martin Zoltán Turbucz	LW	L	31	2025	Budapest
96	(Czech Republic)	Dominik Novotný	C	L	33	2025	Vyškov, Czech Republic
97	(Hungary)	Márk Schlekmann	LW	R	24	2019	Budapest

Coaching staff and team personnel

- Head coach: Balázs Kangyal
- Assistant coach: Tibor Marton
- Goaltending coach: Krisztián Budai
