= David Stach =

Czech ice hockey player

- Born: February 22, 1992 (age 33); Kladno, Czechoslovakia
- Height: 6 ft 0 in (183 cm)
- Weight: 176 lb (80 kg; 12 st 8 lb)
- Position: Left wing
- Shoots: Right
- Czech 1. Liga team Former teams: HC Kladno; Lukko; Piráti Chomutov; HC Plzeň
- Playing career: 2012–present

David Stach (born February 22, 1992) is a Czech ice hockey player who is currently playing for HSC Csíkszereda in the Erste Liga.

Stach has previously played in the Czech Extraliga for Piráti Chomutov, HC Kladno and HC Plzeň as well as in SM-liiga with Lukko.
