= Tüskecsarnok =

Coordinates: 47.4717°N 19.0578°E

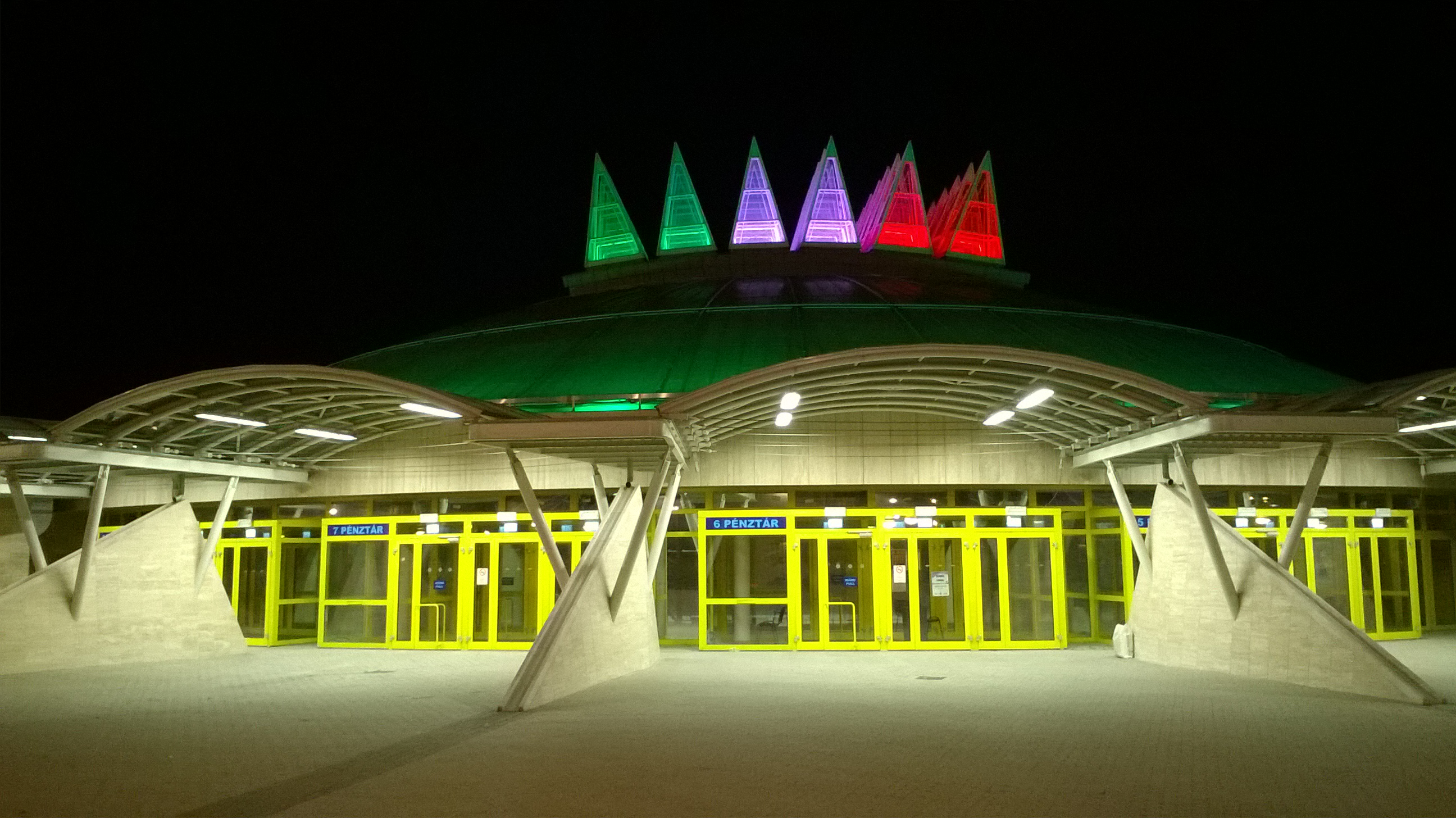
- Interactive map of Tüskecsarnok
- Location: Budapest, Hungary
- Capacity: 2540 (ice hockey); 3908 (basketball)
- Field size: 60 x 30 m

Construction
- Built: 1993–1998; 2012–2014
- Opened: November 27, 2014
- Cost: 4 billion Hungarian Forint (1998) + 5.9 billion Hungarian Forint (2012)

Tenant
- MAC Budapest

Tüskecsarnok is a multi-purpose indoor arena in Budapest, Hungary. It is primarily used for ice sports and is the home arena of Hungarian top division ice hockey club MAC Budapest. It was opened in 2014.
