= 2021–22 ICE Hockey League season =

2021–22 bet-at-home ICE Hockey League
- League: ICE Hockey League
- Sport: Ice hockey
- Duration: Regular season: 16 September 2021 – 1 February 2022
- Games: Regular season: 308
- Teams: 14

Regular season
- Winners: EC Red Bull Salzburg
- Runners-up: EC VSV

Play-offs
- Champions: EC Red Bull Salzburg
- Runners-up: Fehérvár AV19

Austrian Hockey League seasons
- 2020–21 season 2022–23 season

The 2021–22 ICE Hockey League season begin on 16 September 2021. The league's title sponsor was bet-at-home.com. The defending champions were EC KAC. On 11 April 2022, EC Red Bull Salzburg won the Austrian Hockey Championship for the 7th time in their history.

== Teams ==
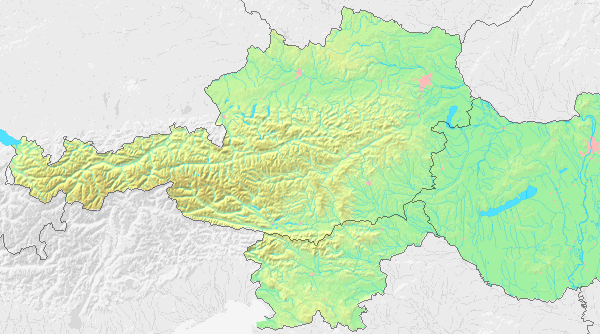
2021–22 ICE Hockey League season teams.

| Team | City | Arena | Capacity |
|---|---|---|---|
| Dornbirn Bulldogs | (Austria) Dornbirn | Messestadion Dornbirn | 4,270 |
| Moser Medical Graz 99ers | (Austria) Graz | Merkur-Eisarena | 4,126 |
| HC TWK Innsbruck | (Austria) Innsbruck | Tiroler Wasserkraft Arena | 3,000 |
| EC KAC | (Austria) Klagenfurt | Stadthalle Klagenfurt | 4,945 |
| Steinbach Black Wings Linz | (Austria) Linz | Keine Sorgen EisArena | 4,865 |
| EC Red Bull Salzburg | (Austria) Salzburg | Eisarena Salzburg | 3,200 |
| Vienna Capitals | (Austria) Vienna | Erste Bank Arena | 7,022 |
| EC GRAND Immo VSV | (Austria) Villach | Villacher Stadthalle | 4,800 |
| HC Orli Znojmo | (Czech Republic) Znojmo | Nevoga Arena | 4,800 |
| Bratislava Capitals | (Slovakia) Bratislava | Ondrej Nepela Arena | 4,800 |
| HK Olimpija | (Slovenia) Ljubljana | Tivoli Hall | 5,000 |
| Hydro Fehérvár AV19 | (Hungary) Székesfehérvár | Ifjabb Ocskay Gábor Ice Hall | 3,500 |
| HCB Südtirol Alperia | (Italy) Bolzano | Eiswelle | 7,200 |
| HC Pustertal Wölfe | (Italy) Bruneck | Rienzstadion | 2,050 |

== Standings ==
=== Regular season ===
| Pos | Team | Pld | W | OTW | OTL | L | GF | GA | GD | PCT | Qualification |
|---|---|---|---|---|---|---|---|---|---|---|---|
| 1 | EC Red Bull Salzburg | 49 | 24 | 9 | 6 | 10 | 162 | 109 | +53 | .653 | Qualified to 2022–23 Champions Hockey League and quarter-finals |
| 2 | EC VSV | 47 | 24 | 6 | 3 | 14 | 180 | 147 | +33 | .617 | Qualified to 2022–23 Champions Hockey League and quarter-finals |
| 3 | Fehérvár AV19 | 48 | 25 | 3 | 3 | 17 | 165 | 133 | +32 | .583 | Qualified to 2022–23 Champions Hockey League and quarter-finals |
| 4 | Vienna Capitals | 48 | 23 | 3 | 5 | 17 | 132 | 122 | +10 | .556 | Qualified to quarter-finals |
| 5 | HC Pustertal Wölfe | 49 | 20 | 6 | 6 | 17 | 146 | 139 | +7 | .531 | Qualified to quarter-finals |
| 6 | HK Olimpija | 46 | 22 | 2 | 3 | 19 | 136 | 140 | −4 | .529 | Qualified to quarter-finals |
| 7 | HC Orli Znojmo | 48 | 21 | 4 | 3 | 20 | 168 | 151 | +17 | .514 | Qualified to pre-playoffs |
| 8 | EC KAC | 49 | 18 | 6 | 9 | 16 | 139 | 117 | +22 | .510 | Qualified to pre-playoffs |
| 9 | HCB Südtirol Alperia | 46 | 19 | 4 | 4 | 19 | 125 | 143 | −18 | .500 | Qualified to pre-playoffs |
| 10 | Graz 99ers | 48 | 20 | 4 | 3 | 21 | 142 | 137 | +5 | .493 | Qualified to pre-playoffs |
| 11 | HC Innsbruck | 49 | 19 | 5 | 1 | 24 | 142 | 156 | −14 | .463 | |
| 12 | Dornbirn Bulldogs | 48 | 10 | 4 | 7 | 27 | 118 | 181 | −63 | .313 | |
| 13 | Steinbach Black Wings 1992 | 49 | 8 | 3 | 7 | 31 | 108 | 185 | −77 | .252 | |
| 14 | Bratislava Capitals | 14 | 5 | 2 | 1 | 6 | 42 | 45 | −3 | .476 | Withdrew from the tournament |

Source: ICE Hockey League
Rules for classification: 1) Points; 2) Head-to-head points.

=== Statistics ===
==== Scoring leaders ====
The following shows the top ten players who led the league in points, at the conclusion of games played on 24 February 2022. If two or more skaters are tied (i.e. same number of points, goals and played games), all of the tied skaters are shown.

| Player | Team | GP | G | A | Pts | +/– | PIM |
|---|---|---|---|---|---|---|---|
| (Czech Republic) Radek Prokes | Orli Znojmo | 46 | 25 | 26 | 51 | +20 | 12 |
| (Canada) Anthony Luciani | Orli Znojmo | 47 | 17 | 34 | 51 | -1 | 14 |
| (Austria) Peter Schneider | EC Red Bull Salzburg | 44 | 28 | 22 | 50 | +19 | 6 |
| (Canada) Tim McGauley | HC Innsbruck | 46 | 19 | 29 | 48 | -4 | 53 |
| (Canada) John Hughes | Villacher SV | 43 | 17 | 31 | 48 | +18 | 16 |
| (United States) T. J. Brennan | EC Red Bull Salzburg | 47 | 20 | 26 | 46 | +32 | 22 |
| (United States) Michael Huntebrinker | HC Innsbruck | 44 | 12 | 34 | 46 | +7 | 8 |
| (Austria) Brian Lebler | Black Wings Linz | 46 | 25 | 20 | 45 | -13 | 48 |
| (Canada) Scott Kosmachuk | Villacher SV | 44 | 24 | 21 | 45 | +14 | 42 |
| (Sweden) Johan Harju | HC Pustertal | 47 | 18 | 25 | 43 | +1 | 18 |

==== Leading goaltenders ====
The following shows the top ten goaltenders who led the league in goals against average, provided that they have played at least 40% of their team's minutes, at the conclusion of games played on 2 October 2021.

| Player | Team(s) | GP | TOI | GA | Sv% | GAA |
|---|---|---|---|---|---|---|
| (Sweden) Christian Engstrand | Graz 99ers | 21 | 1262 | 39 | .931 | 1.86 |
| (United States) Jean-Philippe Lamoureaux | EC Red Bull Salzburg | 16 | 963 | 31 | .931 | 1.93 |
| (Finland) Atte Tolvanen | EC Red Bull Salzburg | 26 | 1592 | 51 | .924 | 1.92 |
| (United States) Tomas Sholl | HC Pustertal | 45 | 2716 | 121 | .924 | 2.67 |
| (Austria) Bernhard Starkbaum | Vienna Capitals | 22 | 1310 | 51 | .923 | 2.34 |
| (Denmark) Sebastian Dahm | EC KAC | 39 | 2377 | 79 | .921 | 1.99 |
| (Finland) Rasmus Tirronen | Fehérvár AV19 | 26 | 1533 | 60 | .916 | 2.35 |
| (Sweden) Niklas Lundström | Graz 99ers | 17 | 937 | 39 | .914 | 2.50 |
| (Italy) Justin Fazio | HC Bolzano | 18 | 1027 | 46 | .912 | 2.69 |
| (Austria) David Kickert | Vienna Capitals | 21 | 1222 | 54 | .909 | 2.65 |

== Playoffs ==
=== Bracket ===
Pre-playoffs (best-of-3)
7 | HC Orli Znojmo | 2
10 | Graz 99ers | 0
8 | EC KAC | 2
9 | HCB Südtirol Alperia | 0

Quarter-finals (best-of-7)
1 | EC Red Bull Salzburg | 4
7 | HC Orli Znojmo | 0
2 | EC VSV | 4
6 | HK Olimpija | 3
3 | Fehérvár AV19 | 4
5 | HC Pustertal Wölfe | 0
4 | Vienna Capitals | 4
8 | EC KAC | 3

Semi-finals (best-of-7)
1 | EC Red Bull Salzburg | 4
4 | Vienna Capitals | 0
(Pairings are re-seeded after the first and second round)
2 | EC VSV | 1
3 | Fehérvár AV19 | 4

Finals (best-of-7)
1 | EC Red Bull Salzburg | 4
3 | Fehérvár AV19 | 0

=== Pre-playoffs ===
==== (7) Orli Znojmo vs. (10) Graz 99ers ====
| 2 March | HC Orli Znojmo | 3–2 | OT | Graz 99ers | Nevoga Arena, Znojmo | Recap |
| Prokeš (Köver, Neumann) - 10:25 | | First period | | 19:55 - Hjalmarsson (Martin, Latta) |
| Hrabal (Brittain, Ahl) - 21:28 | | Second period | | 24:13 - Zalewski (Ograjenšek, Hjalmarsson) |
| No scoring | | Third period | | No scoring |
| Ahl (Luciani, Immo) - 69:32 | | First overtime period | | No scoring |
| Pavel Kantor ( 26 saves / 28 shots ) | | Goalie stats | | Christian Engstrand ( 36 saves / 39 shots ) |

| 4 March | Graz 99ers | 4–5 | OT | HC Orli Znojmo | Eisstadion Graz Liebenau, Graz | Recap |
| No scoring | | First period | | 09:24 - Sedlák (Culkin, Prokeš) (PP2); 10:59 - Culkin (Prokeš, Gorčík) (PP1) |
| Ograjenšek (Zalewski, Kernberger) - 28:37; Blood (Boivin, Ograjenšek) - 34:31 | | Second period | | No scoring |
| Alagic (Grafenthin, Zusevics) - 41:05; Zalewski (Hjalmarsson, Ograjenšek) - 48:30 | | Third period | | 53:45 - Zubov (Ahl, Culkin); 56:43 - Prokeš (Luciani) |
| No scoring | | First overtime period | | 87:44 - Gorčík (Bartko, Prokeš) |
| Christian Engstrand ( 28 saves / 33 shots ) | | Goalie stats | | Pavel Kantor ( 68 saves / 72 shots ) |

| HC Orli Znojmo win the series 2–0 |

==== (8) EC KAC vs. (9) HCB Südtirol Alperia ====
| 2 March | EC KAC | 3–2 | OT | HCB Südtirol Alperia | Stadthalle, Klagenfurt | Recap |
| No scoring | | First period | | 06:03 - Miceli (Halmo, Catenacci) |
| No scoring | | Second period | | No scoring |
| Petersen (Tičar, M. Fraser) - 58:48; Hundertpfund (Haudum, Ganahl) - 59:25 | | Third period | | 59:47 - Gazley (Halmo, Findlay) |
| Tičar (Petersen, Postma) - 74:10 | | First overtime period | | No scoring |
| Sebastian Dahm ( 30 saves / 32 shots ) | | Goalie stats | | Andreas Bernard ( 47 saves / 50 shots ) |

| 4 March | HCB Südtirol Alperia | 0–7 | EC KAC | PalaOnda, Bolzano | Recap |
| No scoring | | First period | 13:08 - Petersen (Tičar, Postma) (PP1) |
| No scoring | | Second period | 26:40 - M. Fraser (Schumnig, Koch) |
| No scoring | | Third period | 41:17 - Obersteiner (Petersen, Tičar); 49:42 - Haudum (Postma); 50:12 - Haudum (M. Fraser, Tavželj); 58:28 - Koch (Petersen, Postma) (PP2); 59:41 - Unterweger (Haudum, Obersteiner) (PP2) |
| Andreas Bernard ( 8 saves / 13 shots ) Justin Fazio ( 9 saves / 11 shots ) | | Goalie stats | Sebastian Dahm ( 35 saves / 35 shots ) |

| EC KAC win the series 2–0 |

=== Quarter-finals ===
==== (1) EC Red Bull Salzburg vs. (7) HC Orli Znojmo ====
| 9 March | EC Red Bull Salzburg | 3–1 | HC Orli Znojmo | Eisarena Salzburg, Salzburg | Recap |
| Loney (Pallestrang, Heinrich) - 06:28; Schneider (Raffl, Nissner) (PP1; EN) - 11:37 | | First period | No scoring |
| No scoring | | Second period | No scoring |
| Raffl (Schneider, Heinrich) (PP1; EN) - 59:53 | | Third period | 43:04 - Svoboda (Kvasnica, Matuš) |
| Jean-Philippe Lamoureux ( 21 saves / 22 shots ) | | Goalie stats | Pavel Kantor ( 32 saves / 34 shots ) |

| 11 March | HC Orli Znojmo | 2–3 | EC Red Bull Salzburg | Nevoga Arena, Znojmo | Recap |
| Prokeš (Gorčík, Luciani) - 06:59 | | First period | 16:57 - Loney (Kanzig) |
| No scoring | | Second period | No scoring |
| Immo (Bartko, Ahl) - 52:59 | | Third period | 48:22 - Lebler (Loney, Järvinen); 58:09 - Lebler (Brennan) |
| Pavel Kantor ( 28 saves / 31 shots ) | | Goalie stats | Jean-Philippe Lamoureux ( 25 saves / 27 shots ) |

| 13 March | EC Red Bull Salzburg | 5–3 | HC Orli Znojmo | Eisarena Salzburg, Salzburg | Recap |
| Nissner (Raffl, Schneider) - 04:50; Dalhuisen - 13:10 | | First period | 17:30 - Svoboda (Kvasnica, Matuš) |
| Brennan (Loney) - 29:35 | | Second period | 27:55 - Younan (Zubov, Ahl) |
| Brennan - 50:51; Baltram (Wukovits, Hochkofler) - 52:26 | | Third period | 48:15 - Gorčík (Prokeš, Luciani) |
| Jean-Philippe Lamoureux ( 16 saves / 19 shots ) | | Goalie stats | Pavel Kantor ( 41 saves / 46 shots ) |

| 15 March | HC Orli Znojmo | 0–1 | EC Red Bull Salzburg | Nevoga Arena, Znojmo | Recap |
| No scoring | | First period | 01:17 - Järvinen (Brennan, Loney) |
| No scoring | | Second period | No scoring |
| No scoring | | Third period | No scoring |
| Pavel Kantor ( 37 saves / 38 shots ) | | Goalie stats | Jean-Philippe Lamoureux ( 36 saves / 36 shots ) |

| EC Red Bull Salzburg win the series 4–0 |

==== (2) EC VSV vs. (6) HK Olimpija ====
| 9 March | EC VSV | 4–6 | HK Olimpija | Stadthalle, Villach | Recap |
| Lindner (Rauchenwald) - 00:28 | | First period | 00:18 - Leclerc (Piché); 04:23 - Jezovšek (Čimžar, Robar) (PP1) |
| Collins (Hughes, Zauner) - 39:28 | | Second period | 25:39 - Maïa (Leclerc); 34:34 - Leclerc (Kapel, Čimžar) (PP2); 39:01 - Koblar (Mušič) |
| Lanzinger (Lindner, Flemming) - 50:10; Schofield (Hughes, Lanzinger) - 59:28 | | Third period | 59:59 - Pance (Mušič, Zajc) |
| Tomi Karhunen ( 23 saves / 28 shots ) | | Goalie stats | Žan Us ( 32 saves / 26 shots ) |

| 11 March | HK Olimpija | 3–4 | EC VSV | Tivoli Hall, Ljubljana | Recap |
| Simsic (Leclerc, Murphy) (PP1) - 03:51 | | First period | 16:03 - Flemming (Rauchenwald, Richter) |
| Leclerc (Murphy, Piché) (PP1) - 32:42 | | Second period | 23:56 - Karlsson (Hughes, Collins); 27:34 - Karlsson (Rauchenwald, J. Fraser) |
| Kapel (Čimžar, Robar) (PP1) - 42:12 | | Third period | 57:34 - Kosmachuk (Schofield) |
| Žan Us ( 25 saves / 29 shots ) | | Goalie stats | Tomi Karhunen ( 31 saves / 34 shots ) |

| 13 March | EC VSV | 8–5 | HK Olimpija | Stadthalle, Villach | Recap |
| Oleksuk (Karlsson, Hughes) (PP1) - 19:45 | | First period | 03:48 - Maïa (Leclerc, Čimžar) |
| Hughes (Oleksuk, Brunner) - 23:52; Bacher (J. Fraser, Maxa) - 34:43; Kosmachuk (Krastenbergs, Joslin) (PP1) - 37:54; Richter (Flemming, Lanzinger) - 39:15 | | Second period | 21:58 - Pance (Tomaževič, Kapel); 22:22 - Zajc (Magovac, Murphy); 28:30 - Pance (Leclerc, Čimžar) |
| Schofield (J. Fraser, Kosmachuk) - 51:42; Joslin (Karlsson, Hughes) - 52:14; Karlsson (Hughes, Flemming) (EN) - 57:21 | | Third period | 46:39 - Leclerc (Pance, Piché) (PP1) |
| Alexander Schmidt (ice hockey) ( 26 saves / 31 shots ) | | Goalie stats | Žan Us ( 34 saves / 41 shots ) |

| 15 March | HK Olimpija | 2–5 | EC VSV | Tivoli Hall, Ljubljana | Recap |
| No scoring | | First period | 08:26 - Kosmachuk (Joslin, Krastenbergs) (PP1); 16:08 - Krastenbergs (Zauner, Schofield) |
| Robar (Tomaževič, Maïa) - 23:33; Koblar (Sodja, Čimžar) - 37:40 | | Second period | 22:36 - Maxa (Lindner, Schmidt) |
| No scoring | | Third period | 45:52 - Krastenbergs (Kosmachuk); 55:42 - Schofield (Krastenbergs, Kosmachuk) |
| Paavo Holsa ( 15 saves / 20 shots ) | | Goalie stats | Alexander Schmidt ( 31 saves / 33 shots ) |

| 18 March | EC VSV | 6–8 | HK Olimpija | Stadthalle, Villach | Recap |
| Kosmachuk (Schofield) - 12:32; Karlsson (Hughes, Oleksuk) (PP1) - 14:25; Oleksuk (Karlsson, Hughes) (PP1) - 16:08 | | First period | 03:56 - Čepon (Maïa); 07:26 - Piché (Pance); 17:35 - Leclerc (Piché, Čimžar); 19:12 - Zajc (Simšič, Magovac) |
| Karlsson (J. Fraser, Hughes) - 28:42 | | Second period | 27:05 - Simšič (Piché, Zajc); 32:25 - Zajc (Tomaževič, Kapel) |
| Lindner (Hughes, Oleksuk) - 42:24; Kosmachuk (Joslin, Rauchenwald) (EN) - 59:59 | | Third period | 46:03 - Koblar (Mušič, Sodja); 51:55 - Pance (Štebih, Zajc) (PP1) |
| Alexander Schmidt ( 14 saves / 18 shots ) Tomi Karhunen ( 14 saves / 17 shots ) | | Goalie stats | Žan Us ( 45 saves / 51 shots ) |

| 20 March | HK Olimpija | 3–2 | OT | EC VSV | Tivoli Hall, Ljubljana | Recap |
| Kapel (Pance, Piché) - 11:51; Čimžar (Maïa, Magovac) - 17:59 | | First period | | No scoring |
| No scoring | | Second period | | 26:29 - Moderer (Schofield, Krastenbergs) |
| No scoring | | Third period | | 54:07 - Kosmachuk (Joslin, Krastenbergs) |
| Tomaževič (Crnovič, Kapel) - 78:02 | | First overtime period | | No scoring |
| Žan Us ( 31 saves / 33 shots ) | | Goalie stats | | Tomi Karhunen ( 32 saves / 35 shots ) |

| 22 March | EC VSV | 4–1 | HK Olimpija | Stadthalle, Villach | Recap |
| Hughes (Karlsson, Oleksuk) - 03:08; Kosmachuk (Schofield) - 07:59 | | First period | 08:36 - Murphy (Simšič) |
| Schofield (J. Fraser, Hughes) (PP1) - 38:11 | | Second period | No scoring |
| Karlsson (Hughes, Oleksuk) - 59:35 | | Third period | No scoring |
| Tomi Karhunen ( 32 saves / 33 shots ) | | Goalie stats | Žan Us ( 27 saves / 30 shots ) |

| EC VSV win the series 4–3 |

==== (3) Fehérvár AV19 vs. (5) HC Pustertal Wölfe ====
| 9 March | Fehérvár AV19 | 8–1 | HC Pustertal Wölfe | Ifjabb Ocskay Gábor Ice Hall, Székesfehérvár | Recap |
| Jacobs (Terbócs, Dahlroth) - 09:42; Németh (Atkinson, Nilsson) - 09:49; Atkinson (Hári, Kuralt) - 13:10; Magosi (Fournier) - 16:14; Kuralt (Shaw, Hari) - 17:34 | | First period | No scoring |
| Jacobs (Terbócs, Sarauer) - 23:51 | | Second period | No scoring |
| Erdély (Bartalis, Petan) - 41:02; Atkinson (Hari, Kuralt) (PP1) - 55:07 | | Third period | 45:36 - Gerlach (Willcox, Hanna) |
| Rasmus Tirronen ( 23 saves / 24 shots ) | | Goalie stats | Tomas Sholl ( 12 saves / 17 shots ) Hannes Stoll ( 16 saves / 19 shots ) |

| 11 March | HC Pustertal Wölfe | 2–6 | Fehérvár AV19 | Rienzstadion, Bruneck | Recap |
| Hannoun (Stukel, Willcox) (PP1) - 05:34; Hanna (Hannoun, Stukel) - 17:18 | | First period | 08:20 - Bartalis (Petan, Erdély); 18:52 - Bartalis (Petan, Atkinson) |
| No scoring | | Second period | 26:00 - Petan |
| No scoring | | Third period | 45:46 - Terbócs (Erdely, Campbell) (PP1); 50:03 - Terbócs (Dahlroth, Jacobs); 57:00 - Hári (Atkinson) (EN) |
| Tomas Sholl ( 20 saves / 25 shots ) | | Goalie stats | Rasmus Tirronen ( 30 saves / 32 shots ) |

| 13 March | Fehérvár AV19 | 5–2 | HC Pustertal Wölfe | Ifjabb Ocskay Gábor Ice Hall, Székesfehérvár | Recap |
| Shaw (Nilsson, Hári) - 00:31; Shaw (Kuralt, Hári) - 03:52; Shaw (Kuralt, Nilsson) - 13:56 | | First period | 13:02 - Bardaro |
| Petan (Campbell, Hari) (PP2) - 39:43 | | Second period | 27:55 - Hannoun (Stukel, Gerlach) |
| Atkinson (Mihály, Németh) (PP1) - 58:08 | | Third period | No scoring |
| Rasmus Tirronen ( 26 saves / 28 shots ) | | Goalie stats | Tomas Sholl ( 29 saves / 34 shots ) |

| 15 March | HC Pustertal Wölfe | 4–5 | Fehérvár AV19 | Rienzstadion, Bruneck | Recap |
| Gerlach (Mantinger) - 07:38; Willcox (Kristensen, Gerlach) - 11:00; Stukel (Gerlach, Willcox) (PP1) - 18:49 | | First period | No scoring |
| No scoring | | Second period | 26:12 - Shaw (Fournier, Hári); 32:45 - Magosi (Mihály, Nilsson); 33:07 - Hari (Kuralt, Fournier); 37:02 - Shaw (Nilsson, Kuralt) |
| Harju (Bardaro, Carey) (PP1) - 59:52 | | Third period | 58:42 - Bartalis (EN) |
| Tomas Sholl ( 34 saves / 38 shots ) | | Goalie stats | Rasmus Tirronen ( 35 saves / 39 shots ) |

| Fehérvár AV19 win the series 4–0 |

==== (4) Vienna Capitals vs. (8) EC KAC ====
| 9 March | Vienna Capitals | 1–2 | OT | EC KAC | Erste Bank Arena, Vienna | Recap |
| No scoring | | First period | | No scoring |
| No scoring | | Second period | | 38:46 - Postma (Unterweger) |
| Hartl (Meyer, Prapavessis) - 58:28 | | Third period | | No scoring |
| No scoring | | First overtime period | | 68:31 - M. Fraser (Koch, Postma) |
| Bernhard Starkbaum ( 22 saves / 24 shots ) | | Goalie stats | | Sebastian Dahm ( 34 saves / 35 shots ) |

| 11 March | EC KAC | 1–4 | Vienna Capitals | Stadthalle, Klagenfurt | Recap |
| Haudum (Petersen, Obersteiner) - 08:29 | | First period | 09:12 - Hartl |
| No scoring | | Second period | 34:57 - Lowry (SH1) |
| No scoring | | Third period | 58:31 - Meyer; 59:15 - Lowry (Moncada, Bradley) |
| Sebastian Dahm ( 16 saves / 18 shots ) | | Goalie stats | Bernhard Starkbaum ( 20 saves / 21 shots ) |

| 13 March | Vienna Capitals | 5–3 | EC KAC | Erste Bank Arena, Vienna | Recap |
| No scoring | | First period | 18:44 - Koch (Obersteiner, M. Fraser) |
| Lowry (PP1) - 22:03; Bauer (Preiser) - 38:04 | | Second period | No scoring |
| Meyer - 45:41; Hartl - 53:24; Meyer (Bradley, Prapavessis) (EN) - 59:25 | | Third period | 41:10 - M. Fraser (Haudum, Petersen) (PP1); 57:45 - M. Fraser (Koch, Petersen) |
| Bernhard Starkbaum ( 21 saves / 24 shots ) | | Goalie stats | Sebastian Dahm ( 23 saves / 27 shots ) |

| 15 March | EC KAC | 2–3 | Vienna Capitals | Stadthalle, Klagenfurt | Recap |
| Postma (Haudum, Koch) (PP2) - 07:46; Haudum (Postma, Petersen) (PP1) - 19:52 | | First period | 14:05 - Dodero (Wall, Hartl); 15:55 - Sutter (Lowry, Prapavessis) |
| No scoring | | Second period | No scoring |
| No scoring | | Third period | 50:47 - Bradley (Sheppard, Meyer) |
| Sebastian Dahm ( 20 saves / 23 shots ) | | Goalie stats | Bernhard Starkbaum ( 34 saves / 36 shots ) |

| 18 March | Vienna Capitals | 2–3 | OT | EC KAC | Erste Bank Arena, Vienna | Recap |
| Meyer (Wall, Lowry) (PP1) - 18:46 | | First period | | No scoring |
| Sheppard (Meyer, Wall) (PP1) - 24:51 | | Second period | | 30:11 - Schumnig (Petersen, Kraus) |
| No scoring | | Third period | | 54:58 - Schumnig (M. Geier, Hundertpfund) |
| No scoring | | First overtime period | | 65:51 - Kraus (Hundertpfund, M. Geier) |
| Bernhard Starkbaum ( 39 saves / 42 shots ) | | Goalie stats | | Sebastian Dahm ( 36 saves / 38 shots ) |

| 20 March | EC KAC | 5–3 | Vienna Capitals | Stadthalle, Klagenfurt | Recap |
| Obersteiner (Postma, Haudum) - 03:38; Postma (Koch, M. Fraser) - 07:55; M. Fraser (Postma, Ganahl) (PP1) - 16:04 | | First period | 00:20 - Sheppard (Wall, Bradley); 00:40 - Hartl (Schwinger, Prapavessis) |
| Haudum (Steffler, M. Geier) - 38:10 | | Second period | No scoring |
| Ganahl (M. Geier, Hundertpfund) (PP2) - 49:45 | | Third period | 54:01 - Prapavessis (PP1) |
| Sebastian Dahm ( 27 saves / 30 shots ) | | Goalie stats | Bernhard Starkbaum ( 33 saves / 38 shots ) |

| 22 March | Vienna Capitals | 3–2 | EC KAC | Erste Bank Arena, Vienna | Recap |
| Moncada) - 06:05 | | First period | 09:00 - Haudum (Ganahl, Obersteiner) |
| No scoring | | Second period | 26:18 - Koch (Petersen, Postma) |
| Sheppard (Wall, Artner) - 42:35; Bradley (Sheppard) - 50:03 | | Third period | No scoring |
| Bernhard Starkbaum ( 23 saves / 25 shots ) | | Goalie stats | Sebastian Dahm ( 27 saves / 30 shots ) |

| Vienna Capitals win the series 4–3 |

=== Semi-finals ===
==== (1) EC Red Bull Salzburg - (4) Vienna Capitals ====
| 24 March | EC Red Bull Salzburg | 4–1 | Vienna Capitals | Eisarena Salzburg, Salzburg | Recap |
| Brennan (Heinrich, Nissner) (PP1) - 03:41; Wukovits (Hochkofler, Baltram) - 09:14; Harnisch (Thaler, Leonhardt) - 16:47 | | First period | 04:06 - Hartl (Moncada) |
| No scoring | | Second period | No scoring |
| Nissner (Raffl, LoVerde) (EN) - 58:03 | | Third period | No scoring |
| Atte Tolvanen ( 23 saves / 24 shots ) | | Goalie stats | Lorenz Widhalm ( 27 saves / 30 shots ) |

| 26 March | Vienna Capitals | 2–3 | OT | EC Red Bull Salzburg | Erste Bank Arena, Vienna | Recap |
| No scoring | | First period | | No scoring |
| Karlsson (Preiser, Hackl) - 28:23; Sheppard (Wall, Bradley) - 39:11 | | Second period | | No scoring |
| No scoring | | Third period | | 59:21 - Leonhardt (Wukovits, Järvinen); 59:52 - Brennan (Heinrich, Schneider) |
| No scoring | | First overtime period | | 76:44 - Nissner (Schneider, Raffl) |
| David Kickert ( 46 saves / 49 shots ) | | Goalie stats | | Atte Tolvanen ( 26 saves / 28 shots ) |

| 28 March | EC Red Bull Salzburg | 4–0 | Vienna Capitals | Eisarena Salzburg, Salzburg | Recap |
| Dalhuisen (Raffl) - 03:53 | | First period | No scoring |
| Raffl (Schneider) - 30:50; Hochkofler - 34:53; Wukovits (Raffl) (PP1) - 39:09 | | Second period | No scoring |
| No scoring | | Third period | No scoring |
| Atte Tolvanen ( 25 saves / 25 shots ) | | Goalie stats | David Kickert ( 42 saves / 46 shots ) |

| 30 March | Vienna Capitals | 1–5 | EC Red Bull Salzburg | Erste Bank Arena, Vienna | Recap |
| Prapavessis (Sutter, Meyer) (PP1) - 15:21 | | First period | 18:01 - Brennan |
| No scoring | | Second period | 25:40 - Wukovits (PP1); 25:40 - Schneider |
| No scoring | | Third period | 42:04 - Lebler (Heinrich, Huber); 54:14 - Raffl (Tolvanen) (EN) |
| Starkbaum Bernhard ( 37 saves / 41 shots ) | | Goalie stats | Atte Tolvanen ( 33 saves / 34 shots ) |

| EC Red Bull Salzburg won the series 4–0 |

==== (2) EC VSV - (3) Fehérvár AV19 ====
| 24 March | EC VSV | 3–2 | OT | Fehérvár AV19 | Stadthalle, Villach | Recap |
| No scoring | | First period | | 01:38 - Nilsson (Mihály); 02:21 - Hári (Kuralt, Shaw) |
| Karlsson (Lindner, Oleksuk) - 28:38; Lindner (Hughes, Karlsson) - 33:11 | | Second period | | No scoring |
| No scoring | | Third period | | No scoring |
| Richter (Rebernig, Hughes) - 61:25 | | First overtime period | | No scoring |
| Tomi Karhunen ( 35 saves / 37 shots ) | | Goalie stats | | Rasmus Tirronen ( 26 saves / 29 shots ) |

| 26 March | Fehérvár AV19 | 6–3 | EC VSV | Ifjabb Ocskay Gábor Ice Hall, Székesfehérvár | Recap |
| Erdély (Bartalis, Petan) - 09:46; Shaw (Hári, Atkinson) - 15:46 | | First period | 03:59 - Brunner (Karlsson, Hughes) |
| Mihály (Atkinson, Magosi) - 25:03; Shaw (Hari, Kuralt) - 25:40; Kuralt (Atkinson, Shaw) (PP1) - 39:59 | | Second period | No scoring |
| Bartalis - 58:48 | | Third period | 40:28 - Flemming (Kosmachuk, Krastenbergs); 50:19 - Tschurnig (Moderer, Maxa) |
| Rasmus Tirronen ( 29 saves / 32 shots ) | | Goalie stats | Tomi Karhunen ( 20 saves / 25 shots ) |

| 28 March | EC VSV | 0–4 | Fehérvár AV19 | Stadthalle, Villach | Recap |
| No scoring | | First period | 03:59 - Atkinson (Magosi) |
| No scoring | | Second period | 27:25 - Sarauer (Kuralt, Hári) (PP1); 27:33 - Campbell (Mihály) |
| No scoring | | Third period | 58:06 - Hari (Kuralt) (EN) |
| Tomi Karhunen ( 27 saves / 30 shots ) | | Goalie stats | Rasmus Tirronen ( 41 saves / 41 shots ) |

| 30 March | Fehérvár AV19 | 5–4 | OT | EC VSV | Ifjabb Ocskay Gábor Ice Hall, Székesfehérvár | Recap |
| Hári (Atkinson) - 02:11; Terbócs (Bartalis, Campbell) (PP1) - 13:08; Terbocs (Fournier, Campbell) - 14:50 | | First period | | 17:39 - Krastenbergs (Joslin, Schofield) |
| Erdély (Petan, Campbell) - 37:16 | | Second period | | 28:03 - Joslin (Krastenbergs, Kosmachuk) (PP1); 28:58 - Krastenbergs (Schofield) |
| No scoring | | Third period | | 58:14 - Schofield (Oleksuk, Joslin) |
| Hari (Fournier, Shaw) - 62:14 | | First overtime period | | No scoring |
| Rasmus Tirronen ( 31 saves / 35 shots ) | | Goalie stats | | Tomi Karhunen ( 18 saves / 23 shots ) |

| 1 April | EC VSV | 1–4 | Fehérvár AV19 | Stadthalle, Villach | Recap |
| No scoring | | First period | No scoring |
| Lanzinger (Krastenbergs, Kosmachuk) (PP1) - 39:46 | | Second period | 23:43 - Horváth (Magosi); 34:06 - Magosi (Fournier) |
| No scoring | | Third period | 47:34 - Erdély (Petan); 59:11 - Erdély (Petan) (EN) |
| Tomi Karhunen ( 19 saves / 22 shots ) | | Goalie stats | Rasmus Tirronen ( 30 saves / 31 shots ) |

| Fehérvár AV19 won the series 4–1 |

=== Final ===
| 5 April | EC Red Bull Salzburg | 2–1 | 2OT | Fehérvár AV19 | Eisarena Salzburg, Salzburg | Recap |
| Lebler (Järvinen, Huber) - 07:27 | | First period | | 10:37 - Erdély (Bartalis, Petan) |
| No scoring | | Second period | | No scoring |
| No scoring | | Third period | | No scoring |
| Leonhardt (Wukovits, Brennan) - 64:56 | | Second overtime period | | No scoring |
| Atte Tolvanen ( 34 saves / 35 shots ) | | Goalie stats | | Rasmus Tirronen ( 37 saves / 39 shots ) |

| 7 April | Fehérvár AV19 | 3–5 | EC Red Bull Salzburg | Ifjabb Ocskay Gábor Ice Hall, Székesfehérvár | Recap |
| Hári (Kuralt, Campbell) - 11:39 | | First period | 18:16 - Brennan |
| Hári (Shaw, Kuralt) - 22:57 | | Second period | 24:44 - Schneider (Heinrich, Wukovits) (PP1); 27:24 - Lebler (Järvinen, Heinrich) |
| Petan (Hari) (PP1) - 53:51 | | Third period | 54:50 - Lebler (Järvinen); 57:08 - Schneider (Raffl, Heinrich) (EN) |
| Rasmus Tirronen ( 27 saves / 31 shots ) | | Goalie stats | Atte Tolvanen ( 14 saves / 17 shots ) |

| 9 April | EC Red Bull Salzburg | 2–1 | Fehérvár AV19 | Eisarena Salzburg, Salzburg | Recap |
| No scoring | | First period | No scoring |
| Raffl (Schneider, Nissner) - 38:20 | | Second period | 25:49 - Fournier (Petan, Sarauer) |
| Järvinen (Lebler, Loney) - 58:24 | | Third period | No scoring |
| Atte Tolvanen ( 22 saves / 23 shots ) | | Goalie stats | Rasmus Tirronen ( 23 saves / 25 shots ) |

| 11 April | Fehérvár AV19 | 1–3 | EC Red Bull Salzburg | Ifjabb Ocskay Gábor Ice Hall, Székesfehérvár | Recap |
| Magosi (Kuralt, Hári) - 07:29 | | First period | 15:01 - Dalhuisen (Raffl) |
| No scoring | | Second period | 32:14 - Raffl (Nissner, Brennan) |
| No scoring | | Third period | 58:48 - Brennan (EN) |
| Rasmus Tirronen ( 32 saves / 34 shots ) | | Goalie stats | Atte Tolvanen ( 21 saves / 22 shots ) |

| EC Red Bull Salzburg won the series 4–0 |
