= Anton Karlsson (ice hockey, born 1993) =

Swedish ice hockey player (born 1993)

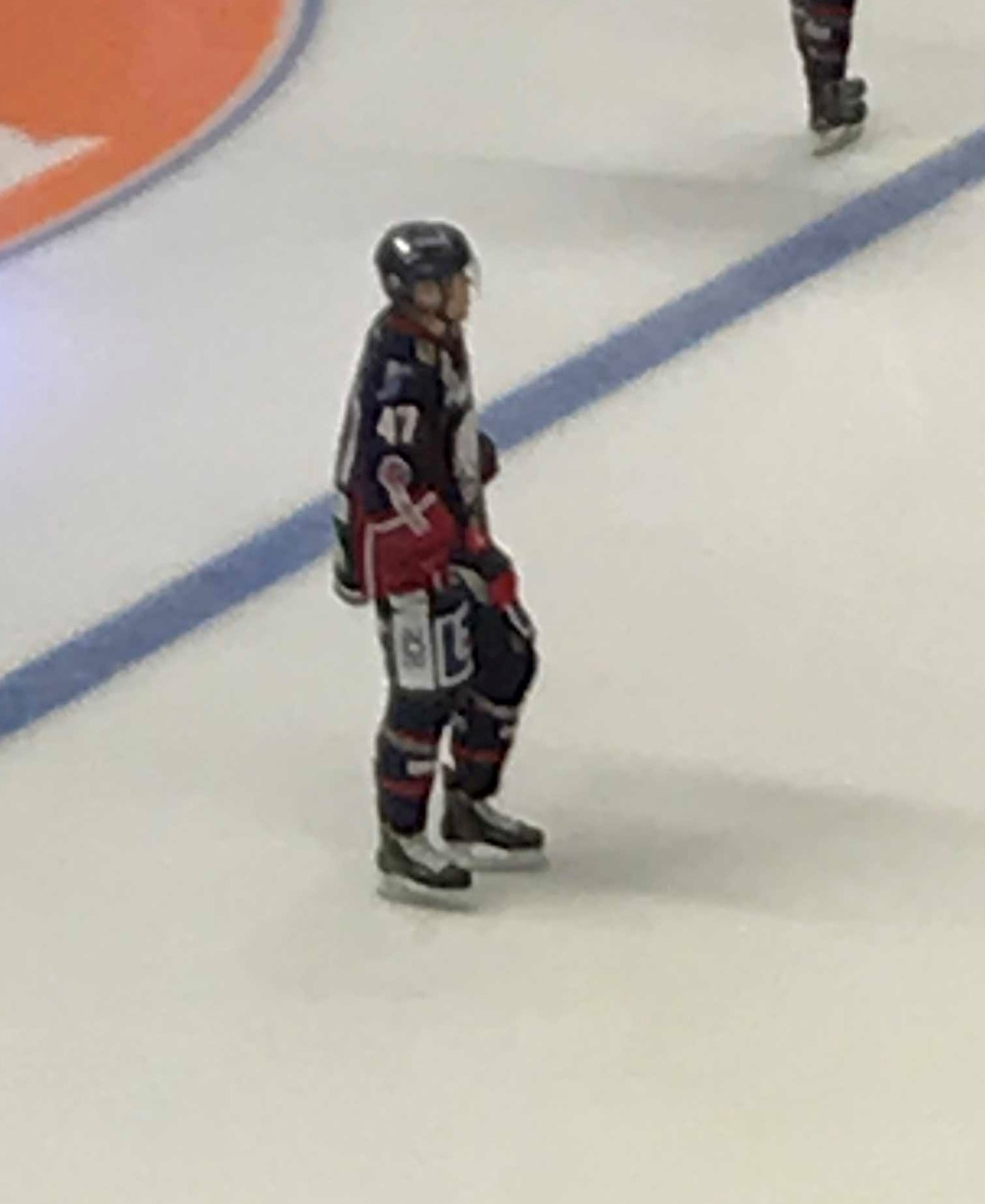
- Born: May 20, 1993 (age 32) Vetlanda, Sweden
- Height: 6 ft 2 in (188 cm)
- Weight: 194 lb (88 kg; 13 st 12 lb)
- Position: Defence
- Shoots: Left
- Liiga team Former teams: KalPa; Linköping HC; Cleveland Monsters; HV71; Vienna Capitals
- NHL draft: Undrafted
- Playing career: 2012–present

Anton Karlsson (born May 20, 1993) is a Swedish professional ice hockey defenceman who is currently playing with KalPa in the Liiga.

== Playing career ==
Karlsson developed as a youth within hometown club, Boro/Vetlanda and later Tingsryds AIF, before securing a move to top flight club, Linköping HC, as a 17-year old in 2010.

Karlsson made his professional Elitserien debut playing with Linköpings HC during the 2012–13 Elitserien season.

In the 2018–19 season, Karlsson posted 4 goals and 13 points in 47 appearances from the blueline for Linköpings. After parts of six seasons with Linköpings HC, he appeared in 247 SHL games registering 12 goals and 40 points before leaving Sweden as a free agent.

On 31 July 2019, Karlsson signed his first North American contract in agreeing to a one-year American Hockey League deal with the Cleveland Monsters, primary affiliate to the Columbus Blue Jackets of the NHL. In his lone season in the AHL in 2019–20, Karlsson made 52 appearances from the blueline posting 2 goals and 11 points before the season was prematurely ended due to the COVID-19 pandemic.

As a free agent, Karlsson opted to return and remain in his native Sweden, agreeing to a one-year contract with HV71 of the SHL, on 15 September 2020.

== Career statistics ==
			Regular season					Playoffs
Season	Team	League	GP	G	A	Pts	PIM	GP	G	A	Pts	PIM
2010–11	Linköping HC	J20	3	0	0	0	0	—	—	—	—	—
2011–12	Linköping HC	J20	48	2	9	11	18	6	0	1	1	2
2011–12	Tranås AIF	Div.1	2	0	0	0	0	—	—	—	—	—
2012–13	Linköping HC	J20	44	2	8	10	40	5	0	1	1	4
2012–13	Linköping HC	SEL	4	0	0	0	2	—	—	—	—	—
2012–13	HC Vita Hästen	Div.1	2	0	0	0	2	—	—	—	—	—
2013–14	Mora IK	Allsv	52	0	3	3	59	6	0	0	0	0
2014–15	Linköping HC	J20	1	0	1	1	0	—	—	—	—	—
2014–15	Linköping HC	SHL	50	0	4	4	28	11	0	0	0	8
2015–16	Linköping HC	SHL	50	4	4	8	18	6	0	2	2	0
2016–17	Linköping HC	SHL	48	2	9	11	8	6	0	1	1	0
2017–18	Linköping HC	SHL	48	2	2	4	36	7	0	0	0	8
2018–19	Linköping HC	SHL	47	4	9	13	51	—	—	—	—	—
2019–20	Cleveland Monsters	AHL	52	2	9	11	32	—	—	—	—	—
2020–21	HV71	SHL	30	0	2	2	8	—	—	—	—	—
2020–21	Linköping HC	SHL	13	0	0	0	4	—	—	—	—	—
2021–22	Vienna Capitals	ICEHL	42	1	6	7	20	11	1	0	1	0
SHL totals			290	12	30	42	155	30	0	3	3	16
