= Matt Bradley (ice hockey, born 1997) =

Canadian-Italian ice hockey player (born 1997)

- Born: 22 January 1997 (age 29) Vancouver, British Columbia, Canada
- Height: 6 ft 0 in (183 cm)
- Weight: 190 lb (86 kg; 13 st 8 lb)
- Position: Centre
- Shoots: Right
- ICEHL team Former teams: HC Bolzano; Toronto Marlies; Milwaukee Admirals; Vienna Capitals; Straubing Tigers
- National team: Italy
- NHL draft: 131st overall, 2015; Montreal Canadiens
- Playing career: 2018–present

Matthew James Bradley (born 22 January 1997) is a Canadian-Italian professional ice hockey player who is a centre for HC Bozen–Bolzano in the ICE Hockey League (ICEHL).

== Playing career ==
Bradley was selected by the Montreal Canadiens in the 2015 NHL entry draft.

In June 2018, he signed with the Toronto Marlies.

In November 2021, he signed a professional try-out contract with the Milwaukee Admirals.

== International play ==
Bradley represented the Italy national team at the 2026 Winter Olympics.

== Personal life ==
Bradley is of Italian descent.

== Career statistics ==
=== Regular season and playoffs ===
			Regular season					Playoffs
Season	Team	League	GP	G	A	Pts	PIM	GP	G	A	Pts	PIM
2011–12	Semiahmoo Ravens U15 A1	PCBHL	46	33	57	90	0	—	—	—	—	—
2012–13	Valley West Hawks U18 AAA	BCEHL U18	25	10	18	28	28	3	1	5	6	0
2013–14	Valley West Hawks U18 AAA	BCEHL U18	37	39	32	71	94	5	7	6	13	10
2013–14	Surrey Eagles	BCHL	8	0	0	0	0	—	—	—	—	—
2013–14	Medicine Hat Tigers	WHL	0	0	0	0	0	17	0	0	0	0
2014–15	Medicine Hat Tigers	WHL	71	17	23	40	24	10	0	2	2	2
2015–16	Medicine Hat Tigers	WHL	68	23	28	51	35	—	—	—	—	—
2016–17	Medicine Hat Tigers	WHL	70	34	43	77	85	11	4	5	9	4
2017–18	Regina Pats	WHL	72	37	42	79	80	7	1	2	3	2
2018–19	Newfoundland Growlers	ECHL	66	15	30	45	47	22	4	3	7	18
2019–20	Toronto Marlies	AHL	2	0	0	0	0	—	—	—	—	—
2019–20	Newfoundland Growlers	ECHL	57	10	24	34	80	—	—	—	—	—
2020–21	Greenville Swamp Rabbits	ECHL	69	21	26	47	85	8	0	2	2	12
2021–22	Greenville Swamp Rabbits	ECHL	9	1	5	6	15	—	—	—	—	—
2021–22	Milwaukee Admirals	AHL	4	0	0	0	4	—	—	—	—	—
2021–22	Vienna Capitals	ICEHL	20	9	14	23	8	11	2	5	7	37
2022–23	Vienna Capitals	ICEHL	47	24	35	59	108	11	6	9	15	8
2023–24	Straubing Tigers	DEL	43	5	13	18	24	10	1	0	1	12
2024–25	HC Bolzano	ICEHL	48	16	25	41	49	11	2	3	5	2
2025–26	HC Bolzano	ICEHL	41	11	29	40	22	5	2	2	4	4
AHL totals			6	0	0	0	4	—	—	—	—	—
ICEHL totals			156	60	103	163	187	38	12	19	31	51

=== International ===
Year	Team	Event	GP	G	A	Pts	PIM
2026	Italy	OG	4	2	0	2	0
2026	Italy	WC	7	0	0	0	2
Senior totals			11	2	0	2	2
