= Jamie Fraser =

Canadian ice hockey player

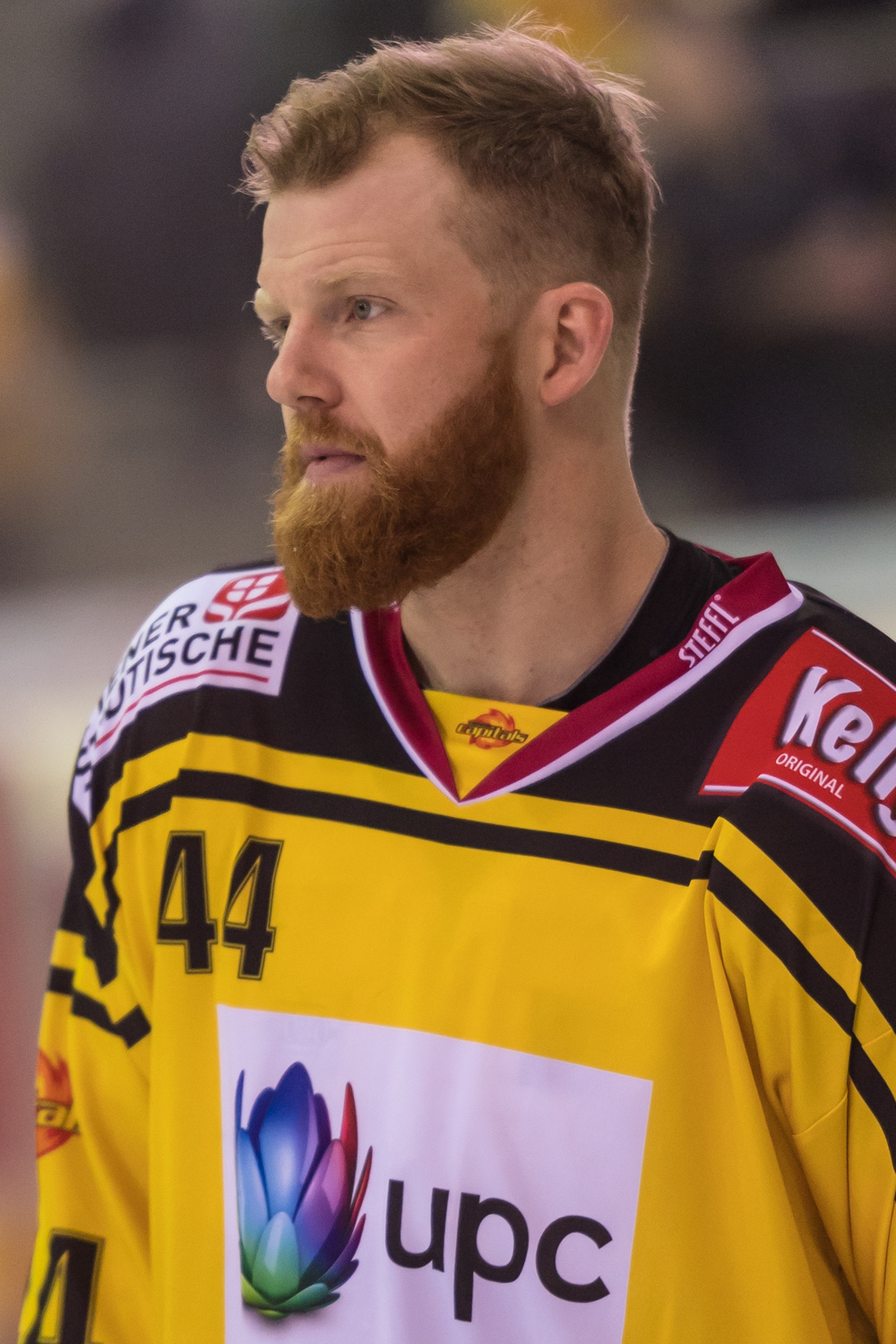
- Fraser with the Vienna Capitals in 2016
- Born: November 17, 1985 (age 40) Sarnia, Ontario, Canada
- Height: 6 ft 0 in (183 cm)
- Weight: 198 lb (90 kg; 14 st 2 lb)
- Position: Defence
- Shot: Left
- Played for: New York Islanders; HDD Olimpija Ljubljana; Vienna Capitals; EC VSV
- NHL draft: Undrafted
- Playing career: 2006–2022

Jamie Fraser (born November 17, 1985) is a Canadian former professional ice hockey defenceman who played one game in the National Hockey League (NHL) with the New York Islanders.

== Playing career ==
Undrafted from the Ontario Hockey League, Fraser signed with the New York Islanders in 2006. After playing a single NHL game with the Islanders in the 2008–09 season, on July 8, 2009, Fraser was signed to a one-year contract with the Minnesota Wild. Assigned to the Wild's American Hockey League affiliate, the Houston Aeros, Fraser finished the 2009–10 season third among Aeros defenseman with 22 points and set a career high with 16 assists.

On July 6, 2010, Fraser was re-signed by the Wild to a one-year contract.

On June 15, 2011, Fraser signed a one-year contract with Slovenian-based team, HDD Olimpija Ljubljana, of the Austrian Erste Bank Hockey Liga. Fraser played a single season with HDD in the 2011–12 season, posting a then professional high 32 points in 49 games before moving to fellow EBEL club, the Vienna Capitals on a multi-year contract on April 25, 2012.

Fraser played six seasons with the Capitals, leaving following the 2017–18 season to sign a contract with his third EBEL club, EC VSV, on May 22, 2018.

Following his fourth season with VSV in 2021–22, Fraser ended his 17-year professional career on April 4, 2022.

== Career statistics ==
			Regular season					Playoffs
Season	Team	League	GP	G	A	Pts	PIM	GP	G	A	Pts	PIM
2002–03	Brampton Battalion	OHL	57	3	11	14	13	10	0	2	2	2
2003–04	Brampton Battalion	OHL	61	4	13	17	36	12	3	1	4	6
2004–05	Sarnia Sting	OHL	66	10	21	31	22	—	—	—	—	—
2005–06	Sarnia Sting	OHL	65	16	26	42	68	—	—	—	—	—
2005–06	South Carolina Stingrays	ECHL	3	1	0	1	2	6	1	1	2	2
2006–07	South Carolina Stingrays	ECHL	27	5	23	28	6	—	—	—	—	—
2006–07	Syracuse Crunch	AHL	2	0	0	0	0	—	—	—	—	—
2006–07	Bridgeport Sound Tigers	AHL	43	3	11	14	16	—	—	—	—	—
2007–08	Bridgeport Sound Tigers	AHL	70	11	13	24	20	—	—	—	—	—
2008–09	Bridgeport Sound Tigers	AHL	66	7	14	21	30	—	—	—	—	—
2008–09	New York Islanders	NHL	1	0	0	0	0	—	—	—	—	—
2009–10	Houston Aeros	AHL	59	6	16	22	36	—	—	—	—	—
2010–11	Houston Aeros	AHL	22	0	1	1	6	—	—	—	—	—
2010–11	Elmira Jackals	ECHL	8	0	4	4	0	—	—	—	—	—
2011–12	HDD Olimpija Ljubljana	EBEL	49	10	22	32	50	11	2	3	5	2
2012–13	Vienna Capitals	EBEL	52	8	26	34	26	15	3	9	12	13
2013–14	Vienna Capitals	EBEL	52	10	25	35	26	5	1	4	5	2
2014–15	Vienna Capitals	EBEL	54	6	28	34	42	15	1	6	7	16
2015–16	Vienna Capitals	EBEL	54	7	22	29	50	5	0	0	0	4
2016–17	Vienna Capitals	EBEL	53	5	19	24	26	12	2	10	12	6
2017–18	Vienna Capitals	EBEL	54	5	29	34	36	11	2	5	7	16
2018–19	EC VSV	EBEL	49	13	25	38	26	—	—	—	—	—
2019–20	EC VSV	EBEL	48	12	26	38	16	—	—	—	—	—
2020–21	EC VSV	ICEHL	34	3	19	22	10	5	2	3	5	2
2021–22	EC VSV	ICEHL	44	7	25	32	10	8	0	5	5	4
NHL totals			1	0	0	0	0	—	—	—	—	—

== See also ==
- List of players who played only one game in the NHL
