= Alex Petan =

Canadian-Italian ice hockey player

- Born: May 2, 1992 (age 34) Delta, British Columbia, Canada
- Height: 5 ft 9 in (175 cm)
- Weight: 181 lb (82 kg; 12 st 13 lb)
- Position: Forward
- Shoots: Right
- ICEHL team Former teams: HK Olimpija; Iowa Wild; Cleveland Monsters; HC Bolzano; Iserlohn Roosters; Fehérvár AV19; HC Pustertal Wölfe
- National team: Italy
- NHL draft: Undrafted
- Playing career: 2016–present

Alexander Franc Petan (born May 2, 1992) is an Italian professional ice hockey player who is a forward for HK Olimpija of the ICE Hockey League (ICEHL) and the Italian national team.

== International career ==
He represented Italy at the 2021 IIHF World Championship and the 2022 IIHF World Championship.

== Personal life ==
Petan was born on May 2, 1992, in Delta, British Columbia to mother Rosanna and father Franc. Alex has a younger brother who is also a hockey player, Nic.

== Career statistics ==
=== Regular season and playoffs ===
			Regular season					Playoffs
Season	Team	League	GP	G	A	Pts	PIM	GP	G	A	Pts	PIM
2009–10	Burnaby Express	BCHL	49	4	3	7	33	—	—	—	—	—
2010–11	Coquitlam Express	BCHL	51	13	20	33	30	4	2	1	3	4
2011–12	Coquitlam Express	BCHL	55	38	50	88	70	6	3	3	6	6
2012–13	Michigan Tech	WCHA	37	15	19	34	32	—	—	—	—	—
2013–14	Michigan Tech	WCHA	39	11	17	28	50	—	—	—	—	—
2014–15	Michigan Tech	WCHA	41	15	25	40	28	—	—	—	—	—
2015–16	Michigan Tech	WCHA	36	18	15	33	22	—	—	—	—	—
2015–16	Iowa Wild	AHL	10	1	3	4	0	—	—	—	—	—
2016–17	Quad City Mallards	ECHL	45	14	19	33	38	5	2	3	5	8
2016–17	Iowa Wild	AHL	5	1	1	2	0	—	—	—	—	—
2016–17	Cleveland Monsters	AHL	14	2	4	6	6	—	—	—	—	—
2017–18	HC Bolzano	EBEL	54	16	31	47	48	18	8	0	8	28
2018–19	HC Bolzano	EBEL	46	17	21	38	77	5	0	2	2	6
2019–20	Iserlohn Roosters	DEL	50	8	19	27	48	—	—	—	—	—
2020–21	Fehérvár AV19	ICEHL	48	18	25	43	46	3	0	1	1	8
2021–22	Fehérvár AV19	ICEHL	44	14	29	43	18	13	3	8	11	12
2022–23	Fehérvár AV19	ICEHL	41	16	19	35	50	4	2	1	3	4
2023–24	HC Pustertal Wölfe	ICEHL	46	14	17	31	38	14	5	5	10	6
2024–25	HC Pustertal Wölfe	ICEHL	46	13	21	34	49	3	1	0	1	2
AHL totals			29	4	8	12	6	—	—	—	—	—

=== International ===
Year	Team	Event	Result	GP	G	A	Pts	PIM
2021	Italy	WC	16th	7	2	1	3	2
2021	Italy	OGQ	DNQ	3	0	0	0	6
2022	Italy	WC	15th	7	2	2	4	6
2023	Italy	WC D1A	19th	5	1	0	1	2
2026	Italy	OG	12th	3	0	0	0	0
Senior totals				25	5	3	8	16

Awards and achievements
Preceded by Tanner Kero	WCHA Player of the Year; 2015–16	Succeeded by Michael Bitzer
