= Reece Willcox =

Canadian ice hockey player

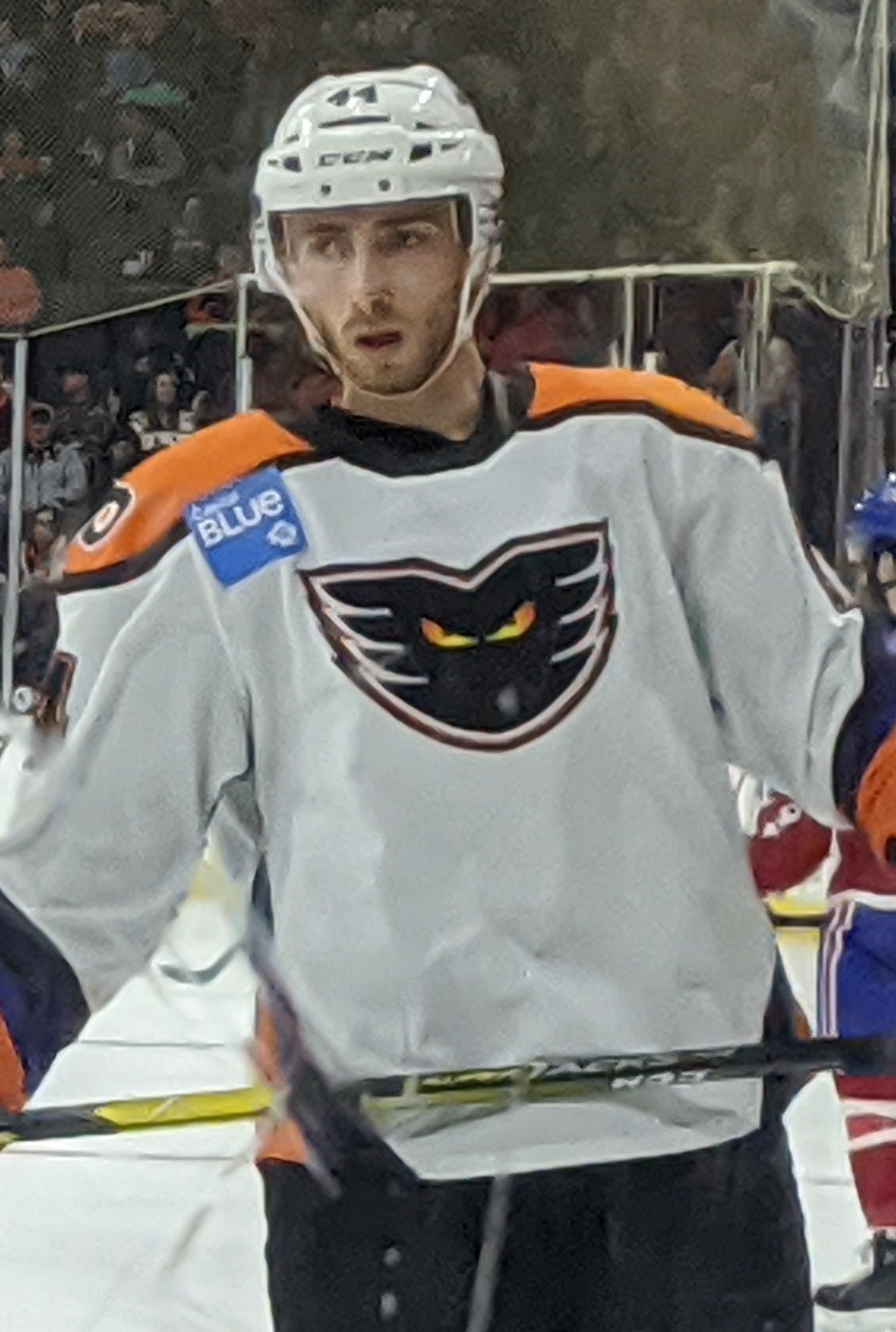
- Reece Willcox on January 11, 2020
- Born: March 20, 1994 (age 32) Surrey, British Columbia, Canada
- Height: 6 ft 3 in (191 cm)
- Weight: 184 lb (83 kg; 13 st 2 lb)
- Position: Defence
- Shot: Right
- Played for: Lehigh Valley Phantoms; Hershey Bears; HC Pustertal Wölfe
- NHL draft: 141st overall, 2012; Philadelphia Flyers
- Playing career: 2016–2023

Reece Kenneth Willcox (born March 20, 1994) is a Canadian former professional ice hockey defenceman who last played for HC Pustertal Wölfe of the ICE Hockey League (ICEHL). He was drafted in the fifth round of the 2012 NHL entry draft by the Philadelphia Flyers.

== Early life ==
Willcox was born on March 20, 1994, in Surrey, British Columbia, Canada to parents Darryl and Barb Wilcox. His younger brother Rhett also plays ice hockey and was drafted by the Western Hockey League's Portland Winterhawks in 2011.

== Playing career ==
Willcox signed a three-year entry-level contract with the Philadelphia Flyers on March 21, 2016. Willcox played for the Lehigh Valley Phantoms of the American Hockey League (AHL) for the duration of his tenure within the Flyers organization.

Leaving as a free agent after parts of five seasons with the Flyers, Willcox opted to continue his career by agreeing to a contract with the Florida Everblades of the ECHL on January 5, 2021. After making 5 appearances with the Everblades into the pandemic delayed 2020–21 season, Willcox was signed to a professional tryout contract to attend the Hershey Bears training camp on January 20, 2021. He remained with the Bears for the duration of the season, registering 5 assists through 27 regular season games.

On July 27, 2021, Wilcox left the AHL as a free agent and signed his first contract abroad in joining Italian club, HC Pustertal Wölfe, for their debut season in the ICE Hockey League.

== Career statistics ==
			Regular season					Playoffs
Season	Team	League	GP	G	A	Pts	PIM	GP	G	A	Pts	PIM
2010–11	Merritt Centennials	BCHL	53	5	9	14	16	4	1	2	3	0
2011–12	Merritt Centennials	BCHL	52	5	18	23	26	9	2	2	4	6
2012–13	Cornell University	ECAC	34	0	5	5	8	—	—	—	—	—
2013–14	Cornell University	ECAC	32	2	5	7	10	—	—	—	—	—
2014–15	Cornell University	ECAC	21	1	3	4	10	—	—	—	—	—
2015–16	Cornell University	ECAC	33	2	11	13	2	—	—	—	—	—
2015–16	Lehigh Valley Phantoms	AHL	6	1	2	3	8	—	—	—	—	—
2016–17	Lehigh Valley Phantoms	AHL	48	3	4	7	12	—	—	—	—	—
2016–17	Reading Royals	ECHL	5	1	1	2	0	1	0	0	0	0
2017–18	Lehigh Valley Phantoms	AHL	57	3	12	15	24	13	0	1	1	4
2018–19	Lehigh Valley Phantoms	AHL	65	3	17	20	25	—	—	—	—	—
2019–20	Lehigh Valley Phantoms	AHL	56	2	11	13	12	—	—	—	—	—
2020–21	Florida Everblades	ECHL	5	0	0	0	2	—	—	—	—	—
2020–21	Hershey Bears	AHL	27	0	5	5	6	—	—	—	—	—
2021–22	HC Pustertal Wölfe	ICEHL	49	5	15	20	18	4	1	3	4	6
2022–23	HC Pustertal Wölfe	ICEHL	48	3	13	16	26	—	—	—	—	—
AHL totals			259	12	51	63	87	13	0	1	1	4
