= Brett Flemming =

Canadian ice hockey player (born 1991)

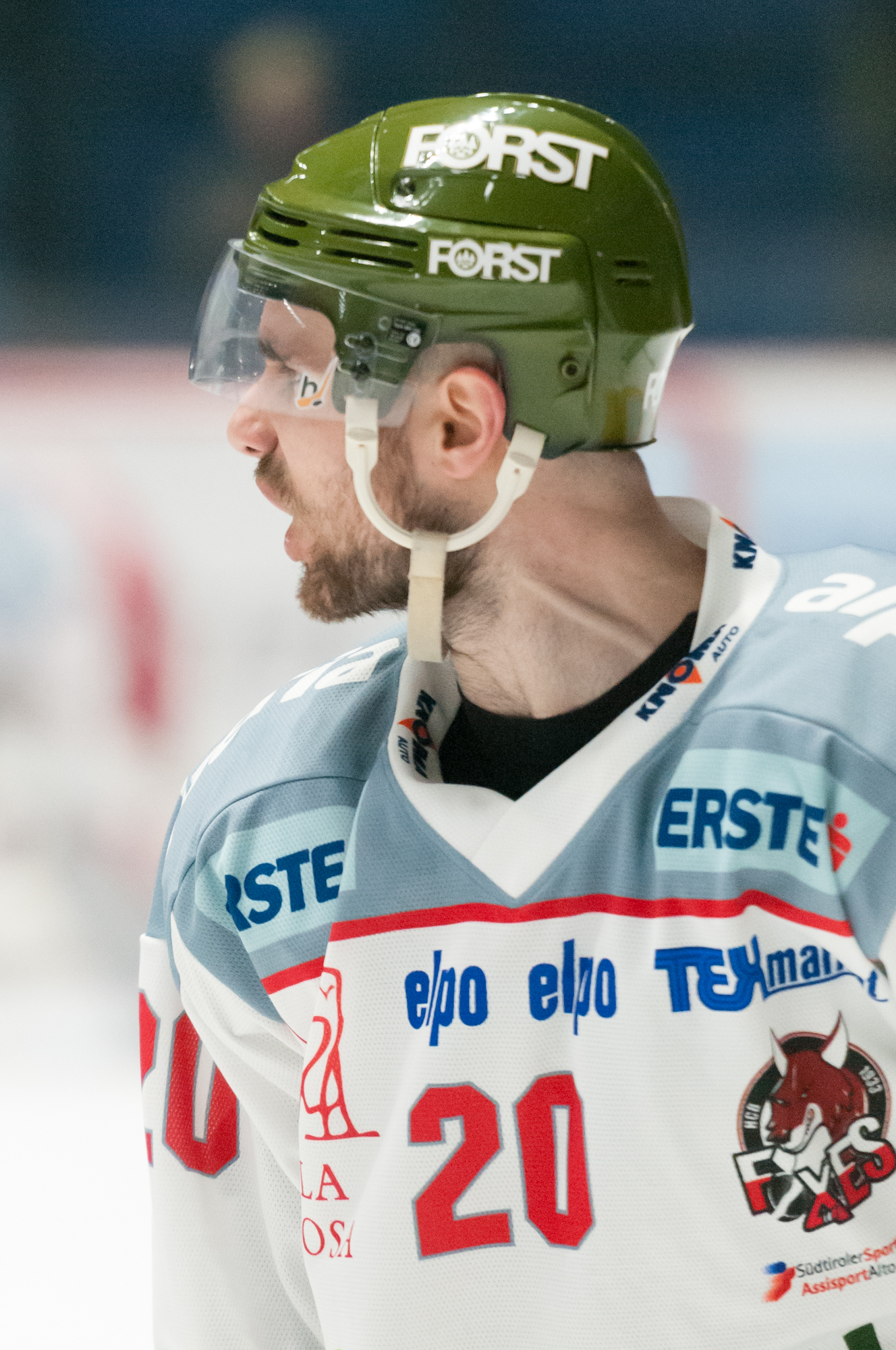
- Born: February 26, 1991 (age 35) Regina, Saskatchewan, Canada
- Height: 5 ft 11 in (180 cm)
- Weight: 184 lb (83 kg; 13 st 2 lb)
- Position: Defence
- Shot: Right
- ACH team Former teams: Wentworth Gryphins; Hershey Bears; Lehigh Valley Phantoms; HC Bolzano; Piráti Chomutov; Vienna Capitals; EC VSV
- NHL draft: 145th overall, 2009; Washington Capitals
- Playing career: 2011–2022

Brett Flemming (born February 26, 1991) is a Canadian former professional ice hockey defenceman. He is currently playing senior men's hockey with the Wentworth Gryphins, competing for the Allan Cup. Flemming was selected by the Washington Capitals in the 5th round (145th overall) of the 2009 NHL entry draft.

== Playing career ==
Flemming played major junior hockey in the Ontario Hockey League (OHL) with the Mississauga St. Michael's Majors.

On December 2, 2010, the Capitals signed Flemming to a three-year entry-level contract. He made his professional debut in the American Hockey League with the Hershey Bears during the 2011–12 season.

After three seasons within the Capitals' minor league affiliates, Flemming left as a free agent and on August 6, 2014, and signed a one-year contract with the Lehigh Valley Phantoms of the AHL.

On September 1, 2015, Flemming signed his first contract abroad, agreeing to a one-year contract with Italian outfit, HCB South Tyrol of the Austrian EBEL. He produced 26 points in 54 games from the blueline for Bolzano in the 2015–16 season. As a free agent following the year, Flemming continued his European career in agreeing to a one-year deal with Czech club, Piráti Chomutov of the Czech Extraliga (ELH), on May 9, 2016.

Following the completion of the 2021–22 season with EC VSV, Flemming announced his retirement from professional hockey after 11 professional seasons on April 26, 2022.

== Career statistics ==
=== Regular season and playoffs ===
			Regular season					Playoffs
Season	Team	League	GP	G	A	Pts	PIM	GP	G	A	Pts	PIM
2007–08	Burlington Cougars	OPJHL	14	0	1	1	12	—	—	—	—	—
2007–08	Mississauga St. Michael's Majors	OHL	47	1	9	10	30	4	0	0	0	6
2008–09	Mississauga St. Michael's Majors	OHL	64	3	25	28	89	10	1	3	4	2
2009–10	Mississauga St. Michael's Majors	OHL	68	1	23	24	90	16	0	5	5	10
2010–11	Mississauga St. Michael's Majors	OHL	68	4	39	43	79	20	1	12	13	28
2011–12	Hershey Bears	AHL	21	2	2	4	31	—	—	—	—	—
2011–12	South Carolina Stingrays	ECHL	41	3	10	13	55	9	2	3	5	8
2012–13	Reading Royals	ECHL	50	2	13	15	77	22	5	7	12	28
2012–13	Hershey Bears	AHL	11	0	1	1	2	—	—	—	—	—
2013–14	Reading Royals	ECHL	52	6	12	18	59	5	0	3	3	6
2013–14	Hershey Bears	AHL	4	0	1	1	2	—	—	—	—	—
2014–15	Reading Royals	ECHL	26	9	14	23	13	7	0	4	4	14
2014–15	Lehigh Valley Phantoms	AHL	37	0	6	6	39	—	—	—	—	—
2015–16	HC Bolzano	EBEL	54	8	18	26	42	6	0	2	2	7
2016–17	Piráti Chomutov	ELH	50	2	11	13	114	17	1	3	4	14
2017–18	Piráti Chomutov	ELH	52	6	13	19	52	—	—	—	—	—
2018–19	Piráti Chomutov	ELH	27	0	9	9	41	—	—	—	—	—
2019–20	HC Bolzano	EBEL	33	6	10	16	45	3	0	3	3	6
2020–21	Vienna Capitals	ICEHL	27	1	9	10	8	—	—	—	—	—
2021–22	EC VSV	ICEHL	38	3	23	26	24	10	2	3	5	6
AHL totals			73	2	10	12	74	—	—	—	—	—

=== International ===
Year	Team	Event	Result	GP	G	A	Pts	PIM
2008	Canada Ontario	U17	1st place, gold medalist(s)	6	0	0	0	0
Junior totals				6	0	0	0	0
