= Gleason Fournier =

Canadian ice hockey player (born 1991)

- Born: September 8, 1991 (age 35) Rimouski, Quebec, Canada
- Height: 6 ft 0 in (183 cm)
- Weight: 191 lb (87 kg; 13 st 9 lb)
- Position: Defence
- Shoots: Left
- EIHL team Former teams: Cardiff Devils; Grand Rapids Griffins; HC Bolzano; Fehérvár AV19
- NHL draft: 90th overall, 2009; Detroit Red Wings
- Playing career: 2011–present

Gleason Fournier (born September 8, 1991) is a Canadian professional ice hockey player, who has played for the Cardiff Devils of the Elite Ice Hockey League (EIHL).

== Playing career ==
Prior to 2009, Fournier played for the Rimouski Océanic of the QMJHL from 2007 to 2011. Fournier was drafted 90th overall by the Detroit Red Wings in the 2009 NHL entry draft.

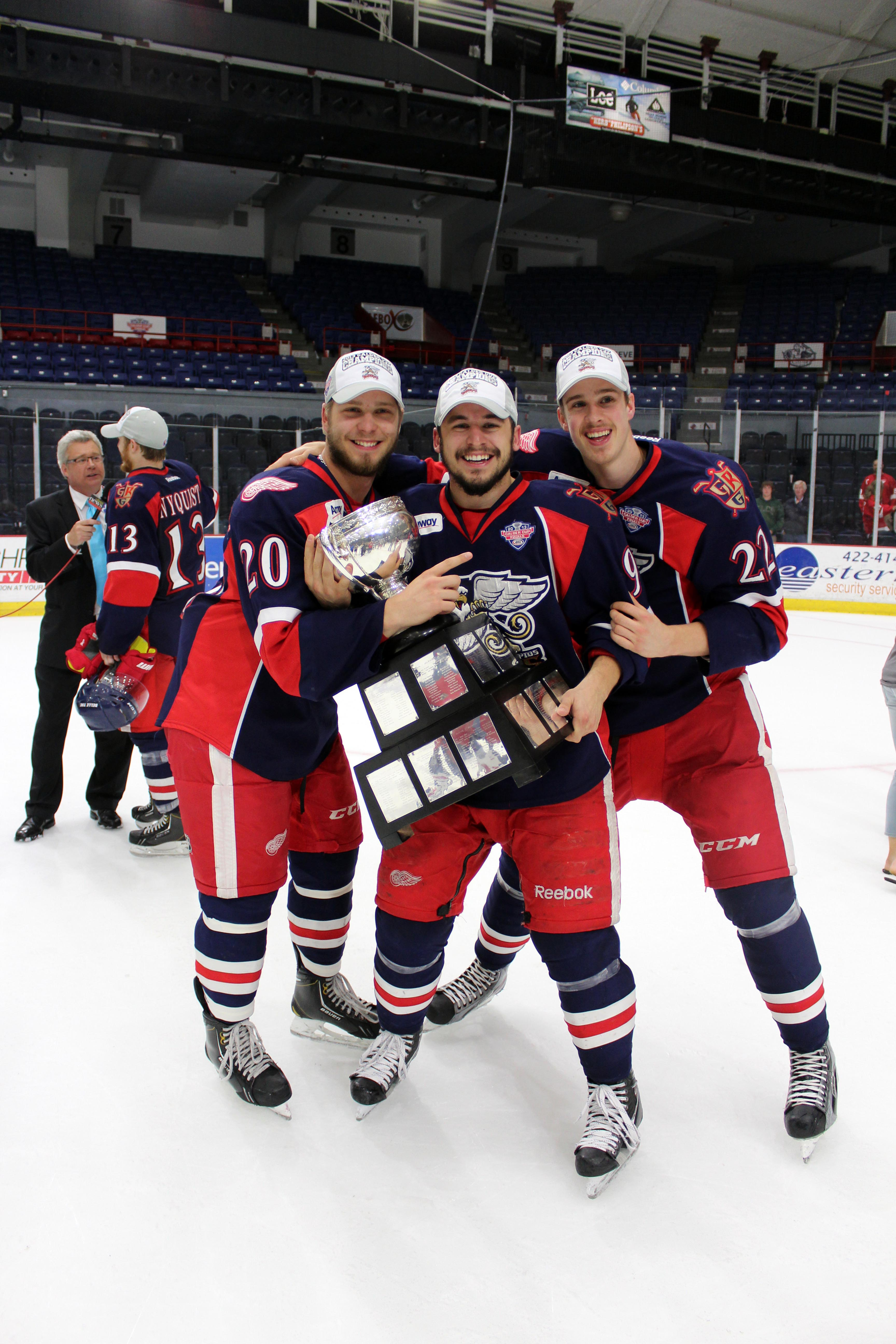
Fournier (#20) with the Calder Cup in 2013.

On November 29, 2010, the Detroit Red Wings signed Fournier to a three-year entry-level contract.

After completing four years with Rimouski Oceanic, Fournier headed to the Toledo Walleye of the ECHL for one year before finally making it to the Grand Rapids Griffins of the AHL for the 2011–2012 season.

At the conclusion of his entry-level contract with the Red Wings, Fournier was released as a free agent and signed a one-year contract with ECHL club, the Orlando Solar Bears on July 29, 2014. Fournier featured in 26 games with the Solar Bears in the 2014–15 season, before he was dealt to the Florida Everblades on January 29, 2015.

On September 30, 2015, prior to the 2015–16 season, Fournier was traded by the Everblades to the Alaska Aces in exchange for Corey Syvret.

== Career statistics ==
=== Regular season and playoffs ===
			Regular season					Playoffs
Season	Team	League	GP	G	A	Pts	PIM	GP	G	A	Pts	PIM
2007–08	Rimouski Océanic	QMJHL	56	3	8	11	26	3	0	0	0	0
2008–09	Rimouski Océanic	QMJHL	66	3	25	28	64	4	0	0	0	0
2009–10	Rimouski Océanic	QMJHL	58	13	37	50	76	12	2	10	12	10
2010–11	Rimouski Océanic	QMJHL	57	12	32	44	58	4	1	1	2	12
2011–12	Grand Rapids Griffins	AHL	13	1	3	4	14	—	—	—	—	—
2011–12	Toledo Walleye	ECHL	55	2	16	18	32	—	—	—	—	—
2012–13	Toledo Walleye	ECHL	15	1	0	1	12	—	—	—	—	—
2012–13	Grand Rapids Griffins	AHL	30	1	5	6	23	6	0	1	1	2
2013–14	Grand Rapids Griffins	AHL	25	0	2	2	4	1	0	1	1	2
2013–14	Toledo Walleye	ECHL	1	0	0	0	0	—	—	—	—	—
2014–15	Orlando Solar Bears	ECHL	26	4	10	14	16	—	—	—	—	—
2014–15	Florida Everblades	ECHL	31	1	9	10	26	7	1	2	3	4
2015–16	Alaska Aces	ECHL	27	8	9	17	20	—	—	—	—	—
2015–16	Cardiff Devils	EIHL	18	2	6	8	10	4	1	1	2	4
2016–17	Cardiff Devils	EIHL	52	7	30	37	79	4	1	2	3	0
2017–18	Cardiff Devils	EIHL	54	12	32	44	30	4	0	3	3	0
2018–19	Cardiff Devils	EIHL	60	24	47	71	28	4	1	1	2	10
2019–20	Cardiff Devils	EIHL	46	13	34	47	18	—	—	—	—	—
2020–21	HC Bolzano	ICEHL	46	5	13	18	24	16	2	5	7	4
2021–22	Fehérvár AV19	ICEHL	46	5	13	18	24	13	1	7	8	4
2022–23	Fehérvár AV19	ICEHL	45	4	11	15	28	6	0	2	2	4
2023–24	Fehérvár AV19	ICEHL	46	5	12	17	57	7	0	0	0	4
2024–25	Cardiff Devils	EIHL	47	3	25	28	41	4	1	2	3	4
2025–26	Cardiff Devils	EIHL	54	9	17	26	47	4	0	2	2	0
ICEHL totals			224	19	49	68	133	42	3	14	17	16

=== International ===
Year	Team	Event	Result	GP	G	A	Pts	PIM
2008	Canada Quebec	U17	7th	5	2	3	5	6
Junior totals				5	2	3	5	6

== Awards and honours ==
Award	Year
AHL
Calder Cup champion (Grand Rapids Griffins)	2013
ECHL
ECHL All-Star Game	2015
EIHL
Defenceman of the Year	2019
EIHL Champion (Cardiff Devils)	2017, 2018
First All-Star Team	2019, 2020
EIHL Playoff Champion (Cardiff Devils)	2026
IIHF Continental Cup
Continental Cup Champion (Cardiff Devils)	2025
