= Dominique Heinrich =

Austrian ice hockey player (born 1990)

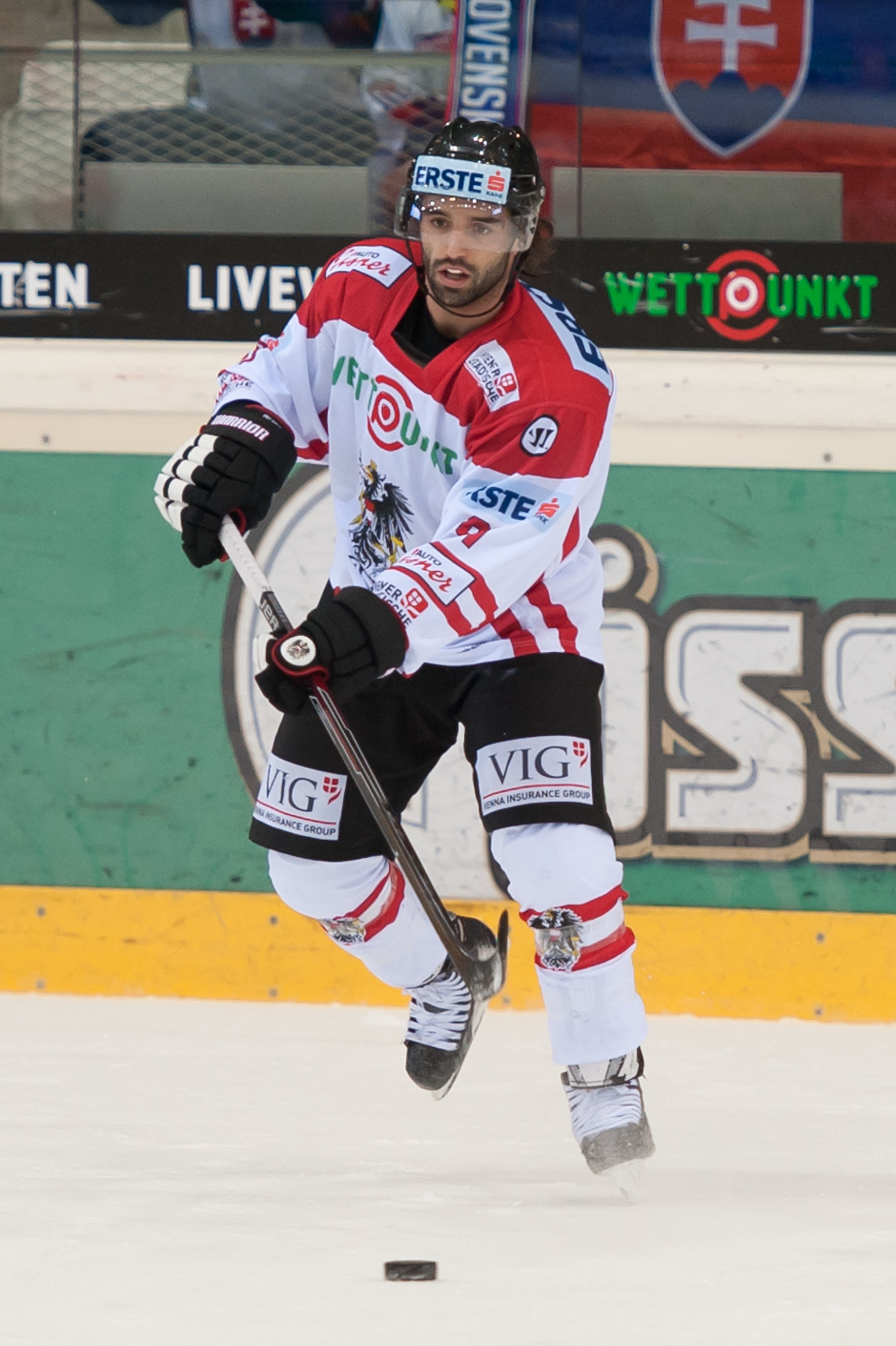
- Born: 31 July 1990 (age 36) Vienna, Austria
- Height: 5 ft 9 in (175 cm)
- Weight: 168 lb (76 kg; 12 st 0 lb)
- Position: Defence
- Shot: Left
- Played for: Wiener Eislöwen; EHC Team Wien; EC Red Bull Salzburg; Örebro HK; Vienna Capitals
- National team: Austria
- Playing career: 2006–2025

Dominique Heinrich (born 31 July 1990) is an Austrian professional ice hockey defenseman who is currently an unrestricted free agent. He most recently played for the Vienna Capitals in the ICE Hockey League (ICEHL).

== Playing career ==
After 9 seasons within Salzburg's organization, Heinrich left as a free agent in order to pursue an SHL career in Sweden, agreeing to a two-year contract with Örebro HK on 27 April 2016. However, in January 2017, he returned to Salzburg.

He participated at the 2015 IIHF World Championship with the Austrian national team.

== Career statistics ==
| | | | Regular season | | | | | Playoffs |
| Season | Team | League | GP | G | A | Pts | PIM | GP | G | A | Pts | PIM |
|---|---|---|---|---|---|---|---|---|---|---|---|---|
| 2005–06 | Wiener Eislöwen U20 | Austria U20 | 11 | 4 | 2 | 6 | 10 | — | — | — | — | — |
| 2006–07 | Wiener Eislöwen U20 | Austria U20 | 27 | 14 | 11 | 25 | 38 | — | — | — | — | — |
| 2006–07 | Wiener Eislöwen | Austria2 | 18 | 2 | 0 | 2 | 10 | — | — | — | — | — |
| 2007–08 | EHC Team Wien | Austria2 | 16 | 4 | 5 | 9 | 2 | — | — | — | — | — |
| 2007–08 | EHC Team Wien U20 | Austria U20 | 3 | 5 | 1 | 6 | 2 | — | — | — | — | — |
| 2007–08 | EC Salzburg U20 | Austria U20 | 4 | 2 | 5 | 7 | 0 | 4 | 1 | 2 | 3 | 4 |
| 2007–08 | EC Salzburg II | Austria2 | 8 | 2 | 3 | 5 | 0 | 4 | 1 | 0 | 1 | 0 |
| 2008–09 | EC Salzburg U20 | Austria U20 | — | — | — | — | — | 1 | 1 | 0 | 1 | 0 |
| 2008–09 | EC Salzburg II | Austria2 | 15 | 9 | 11 | 20 | 10 | 3 | 1 | 3 | 4 | 16 |
| 2008–09 | EC Salzburg | EBEL | 30 | 3 | 2 | 5 | 12 | 14 | 0 | 0 | 0 | 0 |
| 2009–10 | EC Salzburg U20 | Austria U20 | — | — | — | — | — | 1 | 1 | 1 | 2 | 0 |
| 2009–10 | EC Salzburg II | Austria2 | 1 | 0 | 0 | 0 | 12 | — | — | — | — | — |
| 2009–10 | EC Salzburg | EBEL | 30 | 4 | 1 | 5 | 4 | 15 | 1 | 0 | 1 | 2 |
| 2010–11 | EC Salzburg | EBEL | 43 | 6 | 7 | 13 | 12 | 18 | 3 | 2 | 5 | 16 |
| 2011–12 | EC Salzburg | EBEL | 49 | 4 | 15 | 19 | 12 | 6 | 0 | 1 | 1 | 6 |
| 2012–13 | EC Salzburg | EBEL | 54 | 10 | 19 | 29 | 26 | 12 | 2 | 2 | 4 | 14 |
| 2013–14 | EC Salzburg | EBEL | 54 | 8 | 20 | 28 | 20 | 14 | 3 | 6 | 9 | 4 |
| 2014–15 | EC Salzburg | EBEL | 54 | 10 | 25 | 35 | 24 | 13 | 5 | 7 | 12 | 6 |
| 2015–16 | EC Salzburg | EBEL | 53 | 10 | 33 | 43 | 57 | 19 | 2 | 5 | 7 | 2 |
| 2016–17 | Örebro HK | SHL | 22 | 3 | 2 | 5 | 4 | — | — | — | — | — |
| 2016–17 | EC Salzburg | EBEL | 8 | 1 | 5 | 6 | 27 | 11 | 1 | 4 | 5 | 6 |
| 2017–18 | EC Salzburg | EBEL | 30 | 5 | 9 | 14 | 37 | 19 | 2 | 9 | 11 | 4 |
| 2018–19 | EC Salzburg | EBEL | 54 | 14 | 27 | 41 | 20 | 10 | 2 | 7 | 9 | 6 |
| 2019–20 | EC Salzburg | EBEL | 46 | 8 | 16 | 24 | 14 | 3 | 1 | 0 | 1 | 2 |
| 2020–21 | EC Salzburg | ICEHL | 37 | 9 | 21 | 30 | 18 | 11 | 2 | 6 | 8 | 4 |
| 2021–22 | EC Salzburg | ICEHL | 35 | 2 | 14 | 16 | 2 | 12 | 0 | 9 | 9 | 2 |
| 2022–23 | EC Salzburg | ICEHL | 26 | 5 | 9 | 14 | 6 | 16 | 0 | 6 | 6 | 8 |
| 2023–24 | Vienna Capitals | ICEHL | 36 | 4 | 18 | 22 | 10 | — | — | — | — | — |
| 2024–25 | Vienna Capitals | ICEHL | 35 | 1 | 20 | 21 | 4 | 3 | 0 | 0 | 0 | 0 |
| SHL totals | | | 22 | 3 | 2 | 5 | 4 | — | — | — | — | — |
| EBEL/ICEHL totals | | | 674 | 104 | 261 | 365 | 305 | 196 | 24 | 64 | 88 | 82 |
