= Josef Hrabal =

Czech ice hockey player

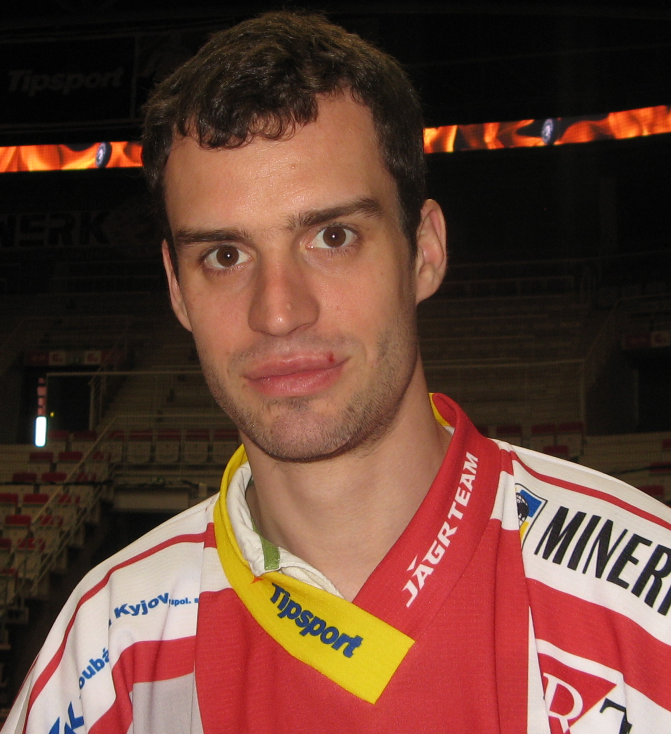
- Josef Hrabal in 2015
- Born: 17 August 1985 (age 40) Přerov, Czechoslovakia
- Height: 6 ft 2 in (188 cm)
- Weight: 190 lb (86 kg; 13 st 8 lb)
- Position: Defence
- Shoots: Left
- IceHL team Former teams: Orli Znojmo; VHK Vsetín; Severstal Cherepovets; Springfield Falcons; Stockton Thunder; Modo Hockey; HC Oceláři Třinec; HC Sibir Novosibirsk; Pelicans; HC Dynamo Pardubice; HC Vítkovice Ridera; EC VSV; Sheffield Steelers; HC ZUBR Přerov
- NHL draft: 248th overall, 2003; Edmonton Oilers
- Playing career: 2002–present

Josef Hrabal (born 17 August 1985) is a Czech ice hockey player who is currently playing for Czech side Orli Znojmo.

== Career ==
Hrabal has played in the Czech Extraliga for VHK Vsetín, HC Oceláři Třinec, HC Dynamo Pardubice and HC Vítkovice Ridera. He also played in the Russian Superleague for Severstal Cherepovets, the Swedish Elitserien for Modo Hockey, the Kontinental Hockey League for HC Sibir Novosibirsk and in the Finnish Liiga for Pelicans.

Hrabal was drafted 248th overall by the Edmonton Oilers in the 2003 NHL entry draft but never played in the NHL.

== Career statistics ==
=== Regular season and playoffs ===
| | | | Regular season | | | | | Playoffs |
| Season | Team | League | GP | G | A | Pts | PIM | GP | G | A | Pts | PIM |
|---|---|---|---|---|---|---|---|---|---|---|---|---|
| 1999–2000 | HC Slovnaft Vsetín | CZE U18 | 32 | 0 | 0 | 0 | 2 | 2 | 0 | 0 | 0 | 0 |
| 1999–2000 | HC Přerov | CZE.2 U18 | 18 | 2 | 1 | 3 | 10 | — | — | — | — | — |
| 2000–01 | HC Slovnaft Vsetín | CZE U18 | 43 | 3 | 5 | 8 | 33 | — | — | — | — | — |
| 2000–01 | HC Minor 2000 Přerov | CZE.2 U18 | 12 | 2 | 8 | 10 | 10 | — | — | — | — | — |
| 2001–02 | HC Vsetín | CZE U18 | 10 | 2 | 5 | 7 | 6 | — | — | — | — | — |
| 2001–02 | HC Minor 2000 Přerov | CZE.2 U18 | 7 | 1 | 4 | 5 | 8 | — | — | — | — | — |
| 2001–02 | HC Vsetín | CZE U20 | 38 | 4 | 2 | 6 | 18 | 2 | 0 | 0 | 0 | 0 |
| 2002–03 | HC Vsetín | CZE U20 | 30 | 6 | 7 | 13 | 12 | 9 | 2 | 4 | 6 | 10 |
| 2002–03 | HC Vsetín | ELH | 6 | 0 | 0 | 0 | 4 | — | — | — | — | — |
| 2003–04 | Vsetínská hokejová | CZE U20 | 46 | 12 | 7 | 19 | 54 | 7 | 1 | 0 | 1 | 2 |
| 2003–04 | Vsetínská hokejová | ELH | 13 | 0 | 0 | 0 | 2 | — | — | — | — | — |
| 2004–05 | Vsetínská hokejová | CZE U20 | 19 | 6 | 8 | 14 | 42 | 8 | 3 | 4 | 7 | 14 |
| 2004–05 | Vsetínská hokejová | ELH | 23 | 0 | 2 | 2 | 8 | — | — | — | — | — |
| 2004–05 | HC Olomouc | CZE.2 | 7 | 0 | 0 | 0 | 6 | — | — | — | — | — |
| 2004–05 | HC Kometa Brno | CZE.2 | 1 | 0 | 0 | 0 | 0 | — | — | — | — | — |
| 2005–06 | Vsetínská hokejová | CZE U20 | 1 | 1 | 0 | 1 | 2 | — | — | — | — | — |
| 2005–06 | Vsetínská hokejová | ELH | 34 | 3 | 9 | 12 | 34 | — | — | — | — | — |
| 2006–07 | Vsetínská hokejová | ELH | 21 | 3 | 7 | 10 | 30 | — | — | — | — | — |
| 2006–07 | Severstal Cherepovets | RSL | 20 | 3 | 4 | 7 | 24 | 5 | 0 | 1 | 1 | 2 |
| 2007–08 | Severstal Cherepovets | RSL | 56 | 3 | 11 | 14 | 73 | 8 | 0 | 1 | 1 | 12 |
| 2008–09 | Springfield Falcons | AHL | 17 | 0 | 1 | 1 | 14 | — | — | — | — | — |
| 2008–09 | Stockton Thunder | ECHL | 8 | 0 | 4 | 4 | 8 | — | — | — | — | — |
| 2008–09 | Modo Hockey | SEL | 6 | 0 | 1 | 1 | 2 | — | — | — | — | — |
| 2009–10 | HC Oceláři Třinec | ELH | 47 | 4 | 8 | 12 | 36 | 5 | 0 | 1 | 1 | 4 |
| 2010–11 | HC Oceláři Třinec | ELH | 48 | 4 | 12 | 16 | 48 | 18 | 3 | 9 | 12 | 16 |
| 2011–12 | HC Oceláři Třinec | ELH | 42 | 7 | 16 | 23 | 44 | 5 | 0 | 3 | 3 | 8 |
| 2012–13 | HC Oceláři Třinec | ELH | 51 | 9 | 27 | 36 | 56 | 13 | 1 | 4 | 5 | 39 |
| 2013–14 | HC Oceláři Třinec | ELH | 37 | 2 | 11 | 13 | 34 | — | — | — | — | — |
| 2013–14 | Sibir Novosibirsk | KHL | 8 | 0 | 2 | 2 | 4 | 3 | 0 | 0 | 0 | 0 |
| 2014–15 | Pelicans | Liiga | 18 | 0 | 1 | 1 | 10 | — | — | — | — | — |
| 2014–15 | HC Oceláři Třinec | ELH | 21 | 4 | 5 | 9 | 24 | 10 | 1 | 0 | 1 | 12 |
| 2015–16 | HC Oceláři Třinec | ELH | 45 | 1 | 5 | 6 | 36 | 5 | 0 | 2 | 2 | 2 |
| 2016–17 | HC Oceláři Třinec | ELH | 44 | 2 | 11 | 13 | 32 | 4 | 0 | 0 | 0 | 4 |
| 2017–18 | HC Dynamo Pardubice | ELH | 22 | 1 | 3 | 4 | 14 | 3 | 0 | 1 | 1 | 6 |
| 2018–19 | HC Dynamo Pardubice | ELH | 30 | 1 | 6 | 7 | 40 | — | — | — | — | — |
| 2018–19 | HC Vítkovice Ridera | ELH | 9 | 0 | 1 | 1 | 0 | 8 | 0 | 1 | 1 | 14 |
| 2019–20 | HC Zubr Přerov | CZE.2 | 8 | 3 | 0 | 3 | 12 | — | — | — | — | — |
| 2019–20 | Sheffield Steelers | EIHL | 19 | 3 | 8 | 11 | 10 | — | — | — | — | — |
| 2020–21 | HC Zubr Přerov | CZE.2 | 25 | 7 | 17 | 24 | 20 | — | — | — | — | — |
| 2020–21 | EC VSV | ICEHL | 10 | 0 | 2 | 2 | 0 | 3 | 0 | 0 | 0 | 27 |
| 2020–21 | Sheffield Steelers | EIHL Series | 16 | 1 | 3 | 4 | 6 | — | — | — | — | — |
| 2021–22 | HC Zubr Přerov | CZE.2 | 25 | 0 | 13 | 13 | 20 | — | — | — | — | — |
| 2021–22 | Orli Znojmo | ICEHL | 15 | 0 | 1 | 1 | 4 | 6 | 1 | 0 | 1 | 5 |
| ELH totals | | | 493 | 41 | 123 | 164 | 442 | 71 | 5 | 21 | 26 | 105 |
| RSL totals | | | 76 | 6 | 15 | 21 | 97 | 13 | 0 | 2 | 2 | 14 |

=== International ===
| Year | Team | Event | GP | G | A | Pts | PIM |
|---|---|---|---|---|---|---|---|
| 2002 | Czech Republic | U18 | 5 | 0 |
| Junior totals |
