= Jan-Mikael Järvinen =

Finnish ice hockey player

- Born: 26 February 1988 (age 38) Pirkkala, Finland
- Height: 5 ft 9 in (175 cm)
- Weight: 176 lb (80 kg; 12 st 8 lb)
- Position: Forward
- Shoots: Left
- Liiga team Former teams: Porin Ässät; Ilves; HPK; Tappara; Adler Mannheim; Malmö Redhawks; EC Salzburg
- Playing career: 2006–present

Jan-Mikael Järvinen (born 26 February 1988) is a Finnish professional ice hockey forward who is currently playing with the Porin Ässät in the Liiga.

== Playing career ==
Järvinen grew up playing as a youth with Ilves Tampere . In 2006, he won the Jr. B Youth Championship and made his professional debut the following 2006–07 SM-liiga season, when he played three league matches. On October 5, 2006, Järvinen played his first SM-liiga game against Lukko. However, he played the majority of the season in the Jr. A with Ilves junior team. He led the team with 15 goals and 42 points.

In April 2007, Järvinen signed a three-year contract with HPK. During his first season in 2007–08, Järvinen played three league matches. For the 2008–09 season, he played with the exception of a handful of Jr. A matches in the second tier Mestis. Järvinen played one game with LeKi and the remaining 32 games with SaPKo. In the 2009–10 season, he was predominately loaned out to continue with SaPKo. Järvinen also played one SM-liiga game with HPK.

In June 2010, Järvinen left HPK and signed a one-year contract extension agreement with SaPKo. During the 2010–11 season, Järvinen, who served as the team's captain, registered 48 points in 54 regular seasonal contests, leading the Mestis in scoring to be awarded the Jouni Rinne Award. He was also awarded as the best player of the season with the Golden Puck, the best Forward with the Mika Helkearo Prize, as a gentleman player with the Waltteri Immonen Prize, and was selected for Mestis First All-Star Team.

In March 2011, Järvinen on the back of his successful season signed an optional two-year contract with Tappara of the SM-liiga. In his first meaningful action in the top league, he contributed with 10 points in 39 games in the 2011–12 season. He also played a total of nine Mestis games during the season on loan with LeKi and KooKoo. On February 13, 2012, Järvinen signed an improved contract extension with Tappara.

In August 2012, Järvinen injured his hand at the European Trophy tournament against Swiss club, SC Bern. Missing several months as a result of a fracture, Järvinen agreed to a conditioning loan with LeKi loan to begin the 2012-13 season, where after rehabilitation, he scored 12 points in 16 matches. Järvinen returned to Tappara in January 2013. During the regular season, he played only 8 games, but rose in the playoffs due to a rash of injuries up to the top-line. At the end of the season, Järvinen won the silver medal. In April 2013, he signed a one-year contract with Tappara before again continuing his tenure with Tappara in October of the same year, for an extended three-years.

In the 2013–14 season, Järvinen broke out offensively, playing alongside, Olli Palola and Pekka Jormakka, recording 8 goals and 30 assists in 60 games. At the end of the season he again won the silver medal. In the 2014-15 season, Järvinen became an Alternate Captain with Tappara. In the Champions League, he was the point leader on Tappara with six points. At the end of the season, Järvinen won his third consecutive Liiga Silver Medal. In the 2015–16 season, he placed third in team scoring with 36 in 59 games. He won his maiden Liiga Championship at the end of the season. In December 2016, Järvinen signed an additional two-year extension agreement with Tappara.

In the 2016–17 season, Järvinen helped Tappara defend their title, winning his second Finnish Championship. In the 2017–18 season, on October 20, 2017, Järvinen registered his first league hat-trick in a local match against former club Ilves, in which Tappara won 8–1. In the playoffs, he scored 10 points in 16 games as Tappara was unable to record a three-peat for the Championship.

In the 2018–19 season, he continued his scoring output, placing second to Kristian Kuusela, with 40 points in 60 games. At the end of the season he won the bronze medal with Tappara.

After spending the first 13 seasons of his career in Finland, in April 2019, Järvinen's contract with Tappara was terminated by mutual consent. In seeking a new challenge, Järvinen signed a one-year contract with new crowned DEL champions, Adler Mannheim on May 3, 2019.

== Personal ==
Järvinen is the second-generation Liiga champion, as his father Kari Järvinen played as a forward with Ilves with over 200 games. Kari coached Jan-Mikael as an assistant coach for Ilves's youth program in 2006–07.

== Awards and honors ==
Award	Year
Mestis
Best Forward	2011
First All-Star Team	2011
Gentleman of the Year	2011
Golden Puck	2011
Liiga
Champion (Tappara)	2016, 2017
ICE Hockey League
Champion (EC Salzburg)	2022
