= Travis Oleksuk =

Canadian ice hockey player

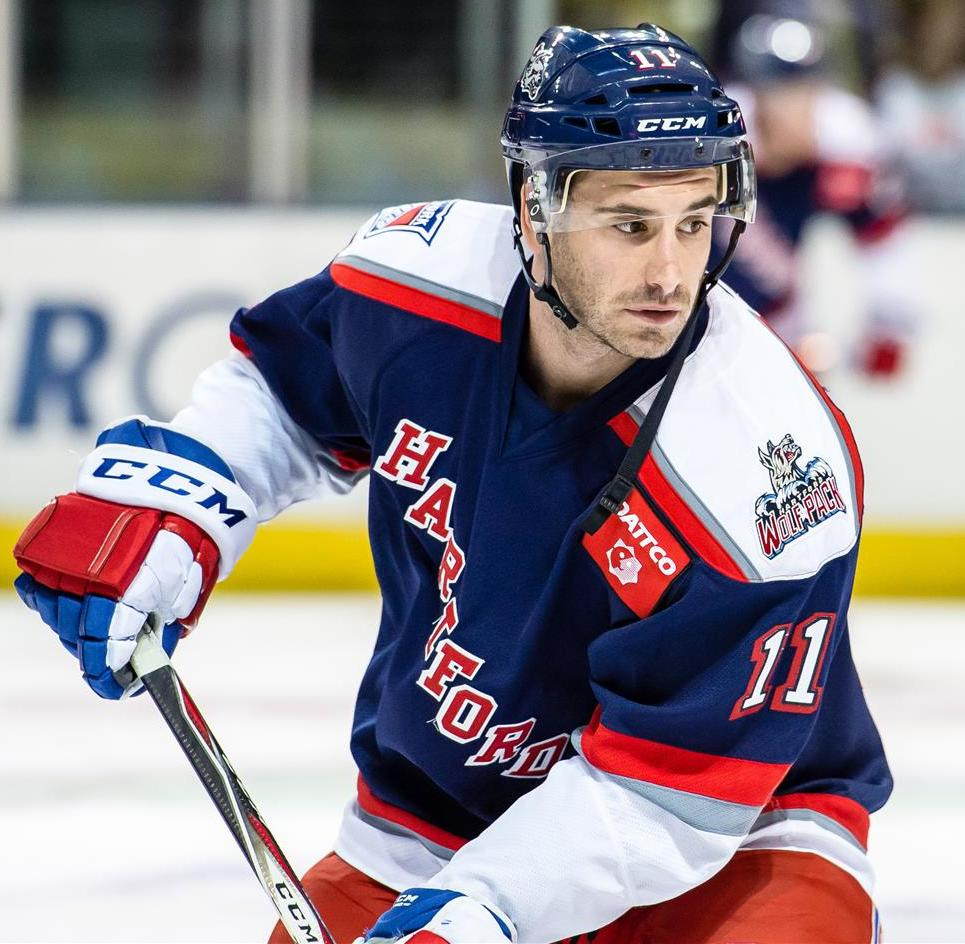
- Oleksuk in 2015
- Born: February 3, 1989 (age 37) Thunder Bay, Ontario, Canada
- Height: 6 ft 0 in (183 cm)
- Weight: 200 lb (91 kg; 14 st 4 lb)
- Position: Centre
- Shoots: Left
- Oberliga team Former teams: Starbulls Rosenheim; Worcester Sharks; Hartford Wolf Pack; HC Bolzano; Graz99ers; Sheffield Steelers; EC VSV
- NHL draft: Undrafted
- Playing career: 2012–present

Travis Oleksuk (born February 3, 1989) is a Canadian professional ice hockey forward. He is currently playing with Starbulls Rosenheim in the German Oberliga. Oleksuk most recently iced with EC VSV in the Austrian IceHL. Before that, Oleksuk had a short spell with Sheffield Steelers of the UK's Elite Ice Hockey League (EIHL). Oleksuk also previously played for Graz99ers of the Austrian Hockey League (IceHL).

== Playing career ==
Oleksuk attended the University of Minnesota Duluth where he played four seasons (2008–2012) of NCAA college hockey with the Minnesota–Duluth Bulldogs, scoring 45 goals and 70 assists for 155 points, and earning 75 penalty minutes, in 133 games played.

On March 30, 2012, the San Jose Sharks of the National Hockey League signed Oleksuk as an unrestricted free agent to an entry-level contract, and he was assigned to play the 2012–13 season with the Worcester Sharks of the American Hockey League.

After three seasons within the Sharks organization, Oleksuk left as a free agent to sign a one-year AHL contract with the Hartford Wolf Pack, an affiliate of the New York Rangers on September 2, 2015. In the 2015–16 season with the Wolf Pack, Oleksuk appeared in 67 games recording 7 goals and 22 points in securing a regular role amongst the checking line.

As a free agent in the following off-season, Oleksuk opted to pursue a European career, agreeing to a one-year contract with Italian based HCB South Tyrol, who compete in the Austrian EBEL on July 28, 2016.

After two seasons with Bolzano and three with Graz 99ers, Oleksuk agreed terms with the Sheffield Steelers for the 2021–22 season. After just 5 games with the Steelers, Oleksuk departed Sheffield in October 2021 for personal reasons. He moved back to Austria to sign for EC VSV.

For the 2022–23 season, Oleksuk continued his career in Europe by moving to German third-tier club, Starbulls Rosenheim of the Oberliga.

== Career statistics ==
			Regular season					Playoffs
Season	Team	League	GP	G	A	Pts	PIM	GP	G	A	Pts	PIM
2006–07	Sioux City Musketeers	USHL	56	6	16	22	35	7	0	2	2	0
2007–08	Sioux City Musketeers	USHL	60	14	30	44	27	4	1	2	3	2
2008–09	U. of Minnesota–Duluth	WCHA	18	0	5	5	10	—	—	—	—	—
2009–10	U. of Minnesota–Duluth	WCHA	33	10	14	24	24	—	—	—	—	—
2010–11	U. of Minnesota–Duluth	WCHA	42	14	19	33	33	—	—	—	—	—
2011–12	U. of Minnesota–Duluth	WCHA	41	21	32	53	6	—	—	—	—	—
2012–13	Worcester Sharks	AHL	60	3	10	13	12	—	—	—	—	—
2013–14	Worcester Sharks	AHL	74	19	21	40	20	—	—	—	—	—
2014–15	Worcester Sharks	AHL	69	10	17	27	18	4	0	1	1	2
2015–16	Hartford Wolf Pack	AHL	67	7	15	22	20	—	—	—	—	—
2016–17	HC Bolzano	EBEL	51	14	19	33	12	9	3	5	8	6
2017–18	HC Bolzano	EBEL	54	10	14	24	18	18	3	1	4	8
2018–19	Graz 99ers	EBEL	47	8	24	32	4	10	2	4	6	2
2019–20	Graz 99ers	EBEL	46	12	20	32	12	1	0	0	0	0
2020–21	Graz99ers	ICEHL	47	8	13	21	10	—	—	—	—	—
2021–22	Sheffield Steelers	EIHL	5	0	2	2	0	—	—	—	—	—
2021–22	EC VSV	ICEHL	30	8	11	19	4	12	2	7	9	0
AHL totals			270	39	63	102	70	4	0	1	1	2

== Awards and honours ==
Award	Year
College
All-WCHA Third Team	2011–12
