= Manuel Ganahl =

Austrian ice hockey player (born 1990)

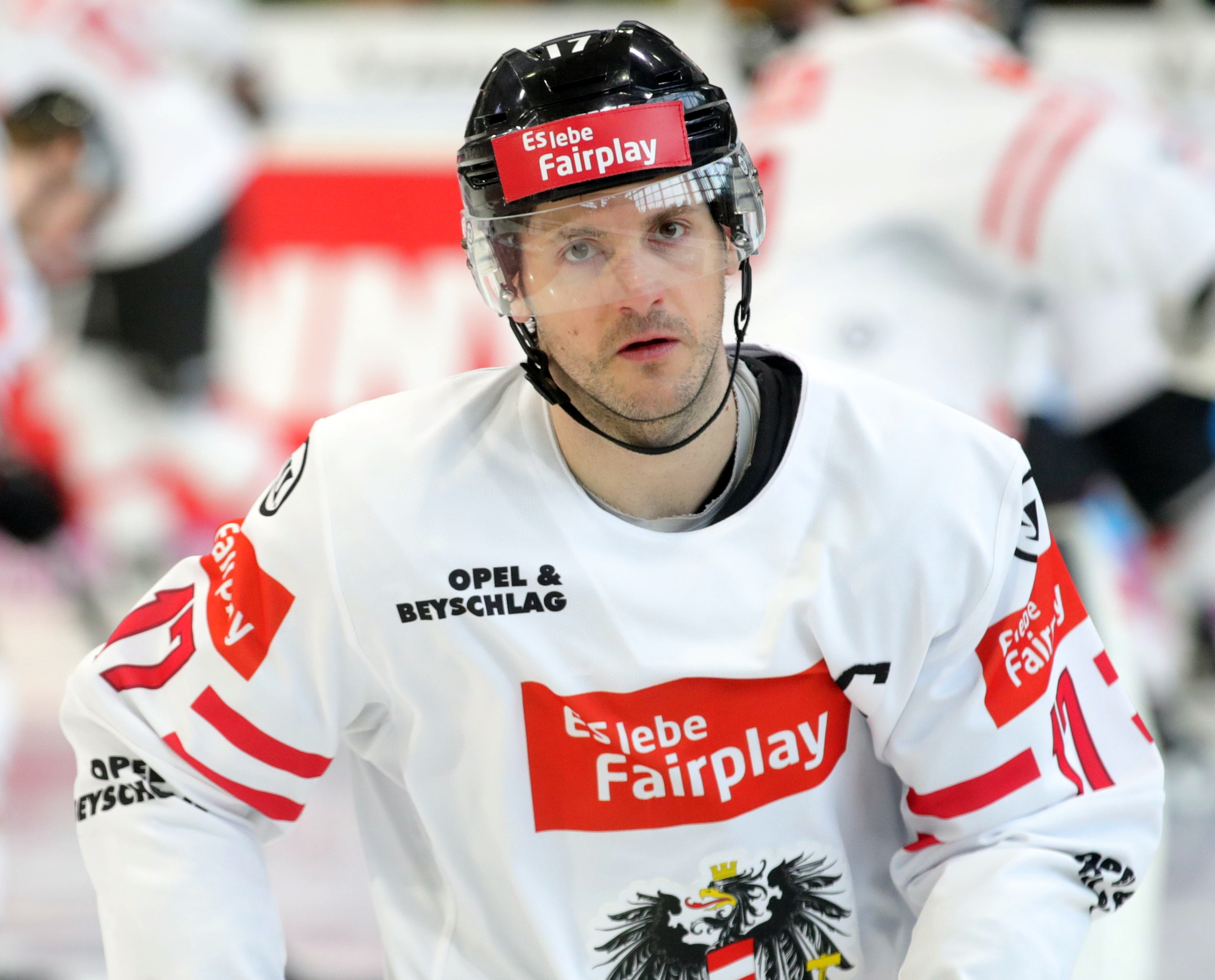
- Ganahl in 2023
- Born: 12 July 1990 (age 36) Bludenz, Austria
- Height: 6 ft 0 in (183 cm)
- Weight: 172 lb (78 kg; 12 st 4 lb)
- Position: Forward
- Shoots: Left
- ICEHL team Former teams: EC KAC; Graz 99ers Lahti Pelicans; Lukko
- National team: Austria
- Playing career: 2008–present

Manuel Ganahl (born 12 July 1990) is an Austrian professional ice hockey forward currently playing for EC KAC of the ICE Hockey League (ICEHL). Ganahl previously played with Graz 99ers before signing a two-year contract with Klagenfurt as an impending free agent on 23 March 2015.

He participated with the Austrian national team at the 2015 IIHF World Championship.
