= Bastien Maïa =

French ice hockey forward

- Born: April 18, 1997 (age 27); Rouen, France
- Height: 6 ft 2 in (188 cm)
- Weight: 176 lb (80 kg; 12 st 8 lb)
- Position: Forward
- Shoots: Right
- Ligue Magnus team Former teams: Dragons de Rouen; SaiPa; Gothiques d'Amiens
- Playing career: 2017–present

Bastien Maïa (born April 18, 1997) is a French professional ice hockey forward currently playing for Dragons de Rouen in the Ligue Magnus.

Maïa previously played 30 games in Liiga for SaiPa, making his debut for the team during the 2017-18 season. On November 26, 2018, Maïa returned to his native France and signed for Gothiques d'Amiens.

On May 10, 2019, Maïa joined fellow Ligue Magnus side Dragons de Rouen.
