= Radim Matuš =

Czech ice hockey player

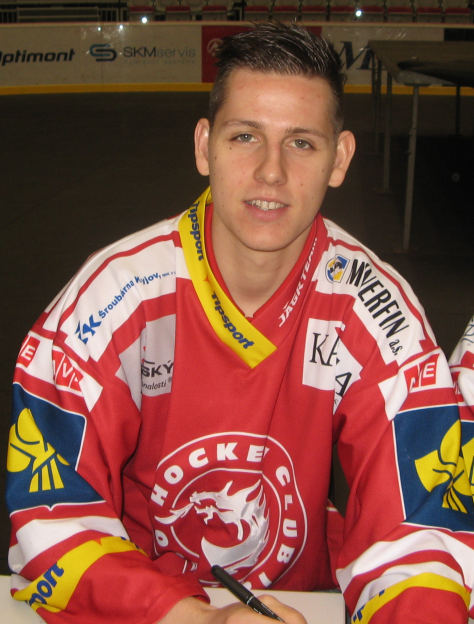
- Born: October 20, 1993 (age 32) Třinec, Czech Republic
- Height: 6 ft 0 in (183 cm)
- Weight: 183 lb (83 kg; 13 st 1 lb)
- Position: Forward
- Shoots: Left
- 2.Liga team Former teams: Orli Znojmo; HC Oceláři Třinec; HC Karlovy Vary
- NHL draft: Undrafted
- Playing career: 2011–present

Radim Matuš (born October 20, 1993) is a Czech professional ice hockey player. He is currently playing for Orli Znojmo of the 2nd Czech Republic Hockey League.

Matuš made his Czech Extraliga debut playing with HC Oceláři Třinec during the 2012–13 Czech Extraliga season.
