= Bálint Magosi =

Hungarian ice hockey player (born 1989)

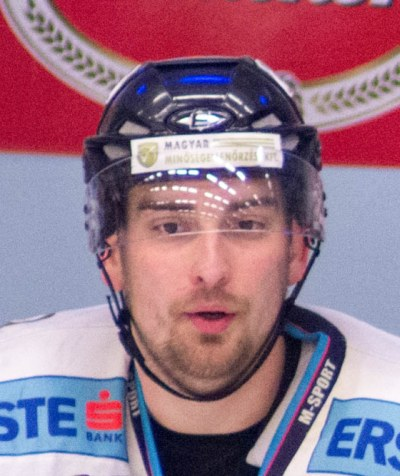
- Born: 15 August 1989 (age 37) Dunaújváros, Hungary
- Height: 6 ft 2 in (188 cm)
- Weight: 198 lb (90 kg; 14 st 2 lb)
- Position: Forward
- Shoots: Left
- MOL Liga team Former teams: DVTK Jegesmedvék; Dunaújvárosi Acélbikák; Alba Volán Székesfehérvár; Diables Rouges de Briançon
- National team: Hungary
- Playing career: 2006–present

Bálint Magosi (born 15 August 1989) is a Hungarian professional ice hockey forward who currently plays for DVTK Jegesmedvék of the MOL Liga. He has formerly played with Austrian Hockey League side Alba Volán Székesfehérvár. Magosi joined the club from county rivals Dunaújvárosi Acélbikák in June 2011.
