= István Bartalis =

Hungarian ice hockey player (born 1990)

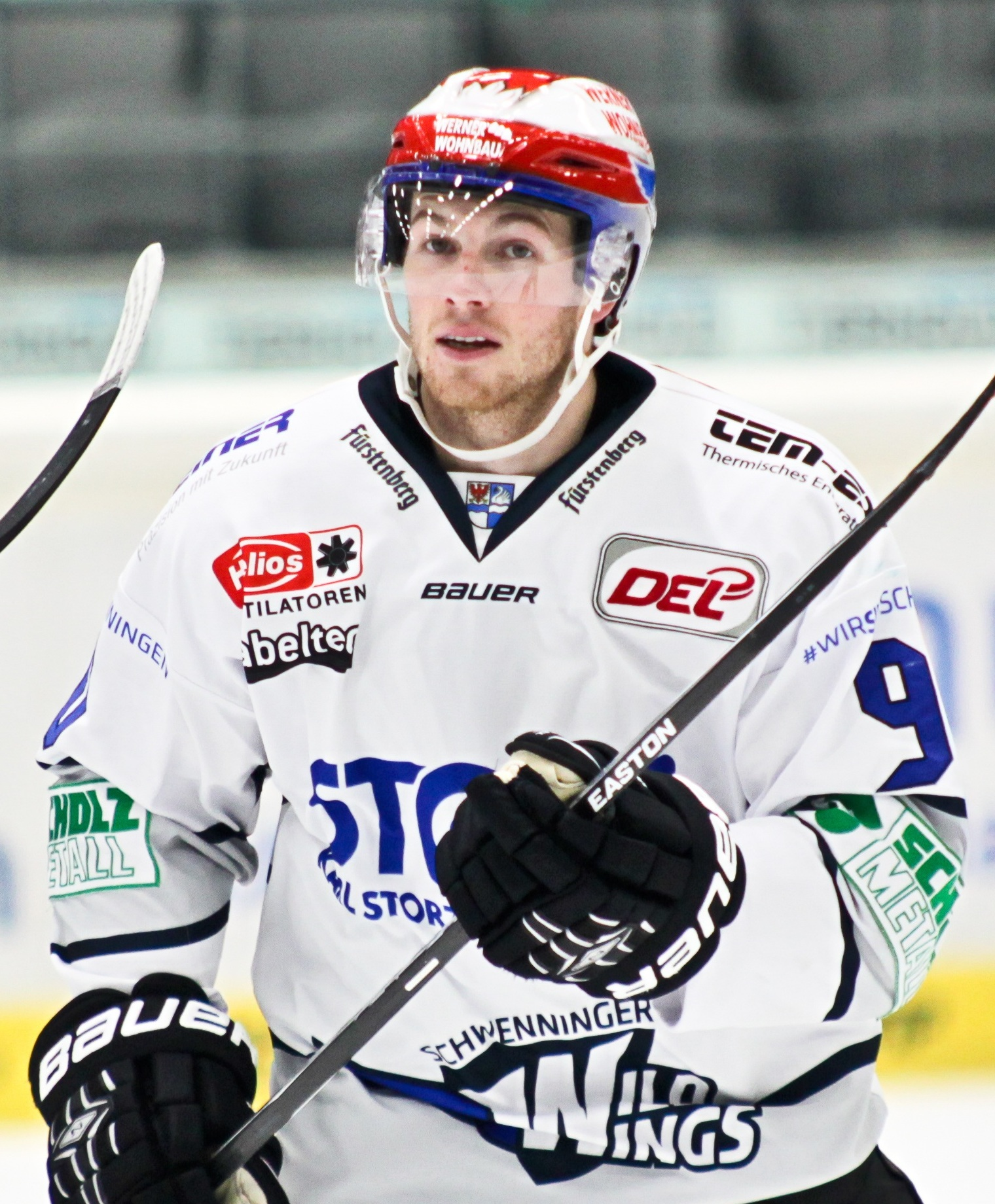
- Born: 7 September 1990 (age 35) Miercurea Ciuc, Romania
- Height: 6 ft 1 in (185 cm)
- Weight: 190 lb (86 kg; 13 st 8 lb)
- Position: Forward
- Shoots: Left
- ICEHL team Former teams: Fehérvár AV19; IF Troja/Ljungby; Schwenninger Wild Wings; HC Vita Hästen
- National team: Hungary
- Playing career: 2009–present

István Bartalis (born 7 September 1990) is a Hungarian professional ice hockey player who is a forward for Fehérvár AV19 of the ICE Hockey League (ICEHL).

== Playing career ==
Bartalis played as a youth in Sweden, playing exclusively within the IF Troja-Ljungby organization. After returning to his native Hungary for two seasons with Fehérvár AV19 of the EBEL, Bartalis opted to move to Germany in signing a one-year deal with top tier DEL club, Schwenninger Wild Wings on 7 July 2016.

Bartalis remained with the Wild Wings for three seasons, leaving out of contract at the conclusion of the 2018–19 season. On 24 June 2019, Bartalis returned to Sweden, agreeing to a one-year contract with HC Vita Hästen of the Allsvenskan.
