= Pavel Kantor =

Czech ice hockey player

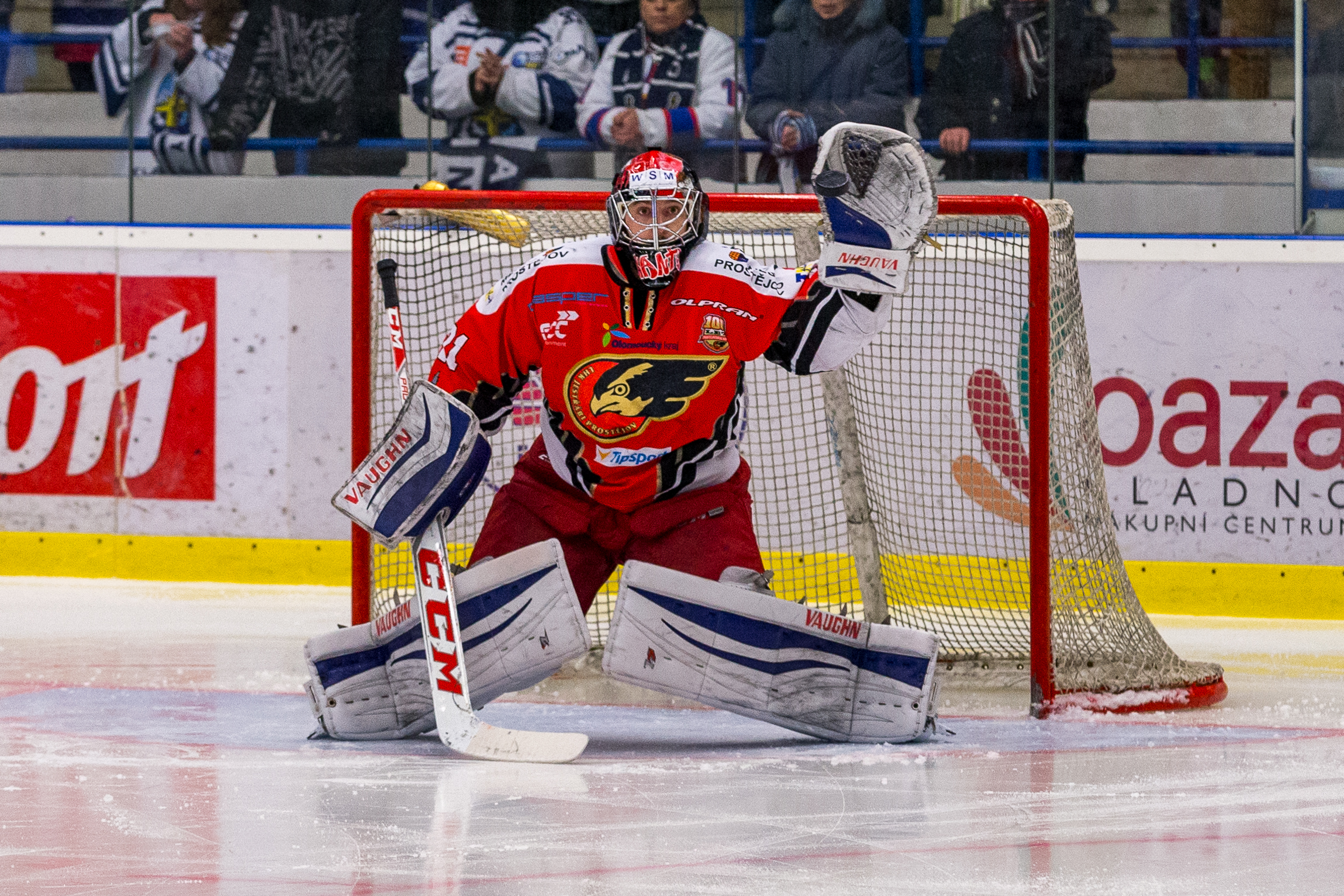
- Born: 17 August 1991 (age 34) České Budějovice, CS
- Height: 6 ft 0 in (183 cm)
- Weight: 176 lb (80 kg; 12 st 8 lb)
- Position: Goalie
- Catches: Left
- Slovak team Former teams: HC Nové Zámky; Mountfield HK; Motor České Budějovice; HC Vítkovice Steel; HC Oceláři Třinec; BK Mladá Boleslav; Sheffield Steelers; HC Dynamo Pardubice; Orli Znojmo
- Playing career: 2011–present

Pavel Kantor (born 17 August 1991) is a Czech professional ice hockey goaltender. He is currently playing for HC Nové Zámky of the Slovak Extraliga.

Kantor previously spent a short stint in 2019 with Elite Ice Hockey League (EIHL) side Sheffield Steelers. Kantor also previously iced for BK Mlada Boleslav of the Czech Extraliga.

Kantor made his Czech Extraliga debut playing with Motor České Budějovice during the 2011-12 Czech Extraliga season.
