= Jesper Dahlroth =

Swedish professional ice hockey player

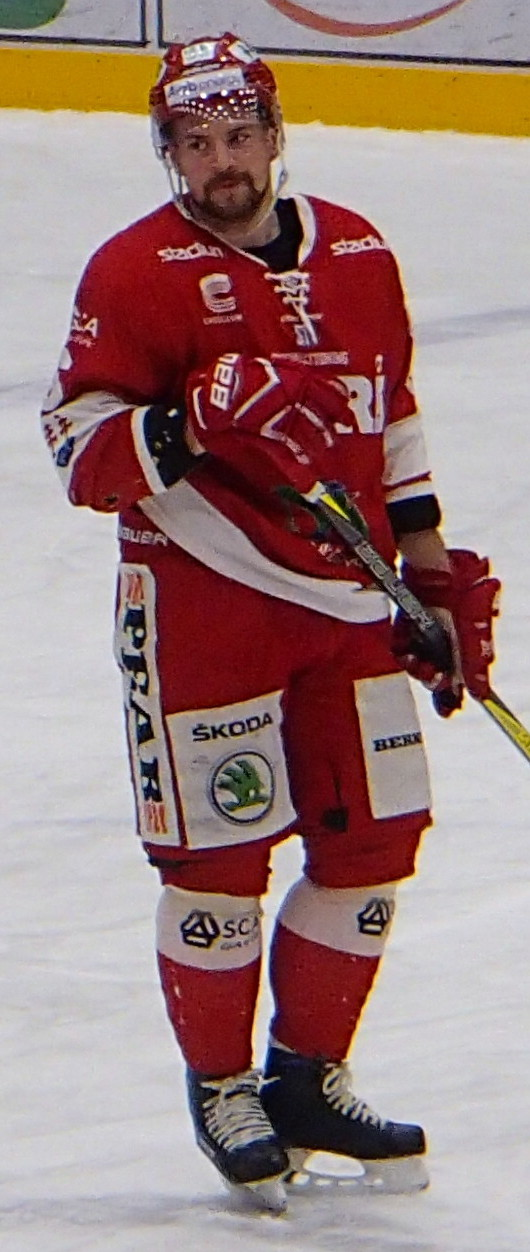
- Born: July 29, 1991 (age 34) Boden, Sweden
- Height: 5 ft 10 in (178 cm)
- Weight: 198 lb (90 kg; 14 st 2 lb)
- Position: Defence
- Shoots: Right
- Norway team Former teams: Frederikshavn White Hawks; Luleå HF; Timrå IK; IK Oskarshamn; Fehérvár AV19
- Playing career: 2010–present

Jesper Dahlroth (born July 29, 1991) is a Swedish professional ice hockey player. He is currently under contract with Frederikshavn White Hawks of the Fjordkraftligaen (Norway).

== Playing career ==
Dahlroth made his professional debut in the Hockeyettan with Bodens HF before moving up the ranks to make his Elitserien debut in the 2009–10 season, playing a single game with Luleå HF. In the following season he moved to continue in the Elitserien with Timrå IK in the during the 2010–11 season.
