= Rick Schofield =

Canadian ice hockey player

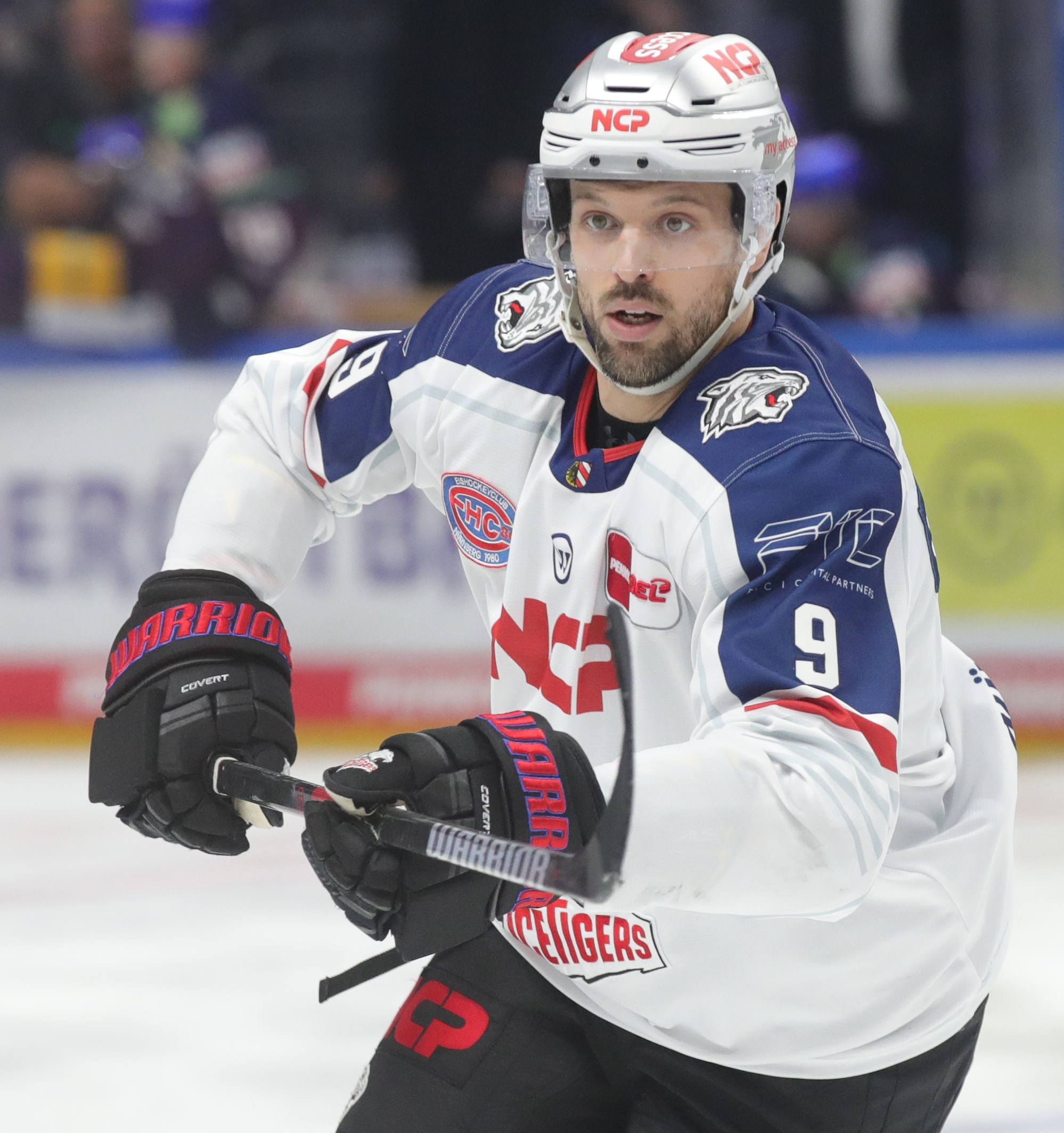
- Born: April 23, 1987 (age 39) Pickering, Ontario, Canada
- Height: 6 ft 2 in (188 cm)
- Weight: 190 lb (86 kg; 13 st 8 lb)
- Position: Centre
- Shoots: Left
- DEL team Former teams: Düsseldorfer EG; Syracuse Crunch; Rochester Americans; HC Bolzano; EC VSV; EHC Black Wings Linz; EC Red Bull Salzburg; Nürnberg Ice Tigers; HC Pustertal Wölfe
- NHL draft: Undrafted
- Playing career: 2011–present

Rick Schofield (born April 23, 1987) is a Canadian professional ice hockey center currently playing for Düsseldorfer EG who compete in the Deutsche Eishockey Liga (DEL).

== Playing career ==
Undrafted, on March 21, 2011, the Anaheim Ducks of the National Hockey League (NHL) signed Schofield as a free agent to a one-year entry-level contract. He was assigned to the American Hockey League, where he played with affiliate the Syracuse Crunch, and later the Rochester Americans.

On August 28, 2013, Schofield opted to pursue a European career, signing a contract with new EBEL entrant HC Bolzano of Italy.

After two successful seasons with Bolzano, including claiming the Austrian Championship in its inaugural season, Schofield left the club as a free agent and signed a one-year contract with fellow EBEL club, EC VSV on April 14, 2015. In the 2015–16 season, Schofield featured in 48 games with Villach, contributing with 34 points.

On April 26, 2016, Schofield joined his third EBEL club in two years, agreeing to a one-year contract with EHC Black Wings Linz.
