= Sebastian Gorčík =

Czech ice hockey player

Sebastián Gorčík
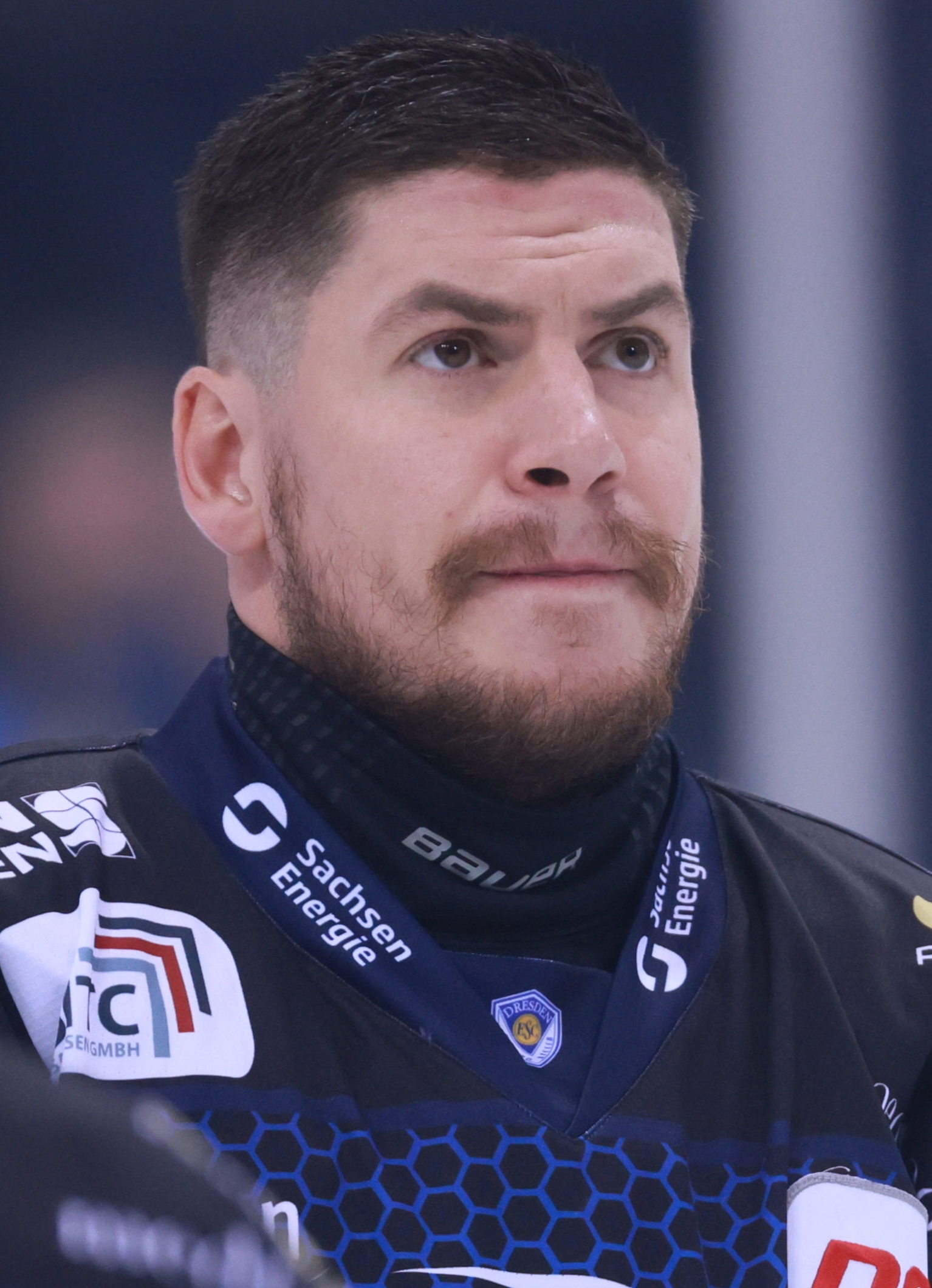
- Sebastian Gorčík, 2025
- Born: September 5, 1995 (age 30) Czech Republic
- Height: 6 ft 0 in (183 cm)
- Weight: 185 lb (84 kg; 13 st 3 lb)
- Position: Forward
- Shoots: Left
- Czech team: HC Karlovy Vary
- Playing career: 2012–present

Sebastián Gorčík (born September 5, 1995) is a Czech professional ice hockey player. He is currently playing for HC Karlovy Vary of the Czech Extraliga.

Gorčík made his Czech Extraliga debut playing with HC Karlovy Vary during the 2014–15 Czech Extraliga season.
