= Alexander Rauchenwald =

Austrian ice hockey player (born 1993)

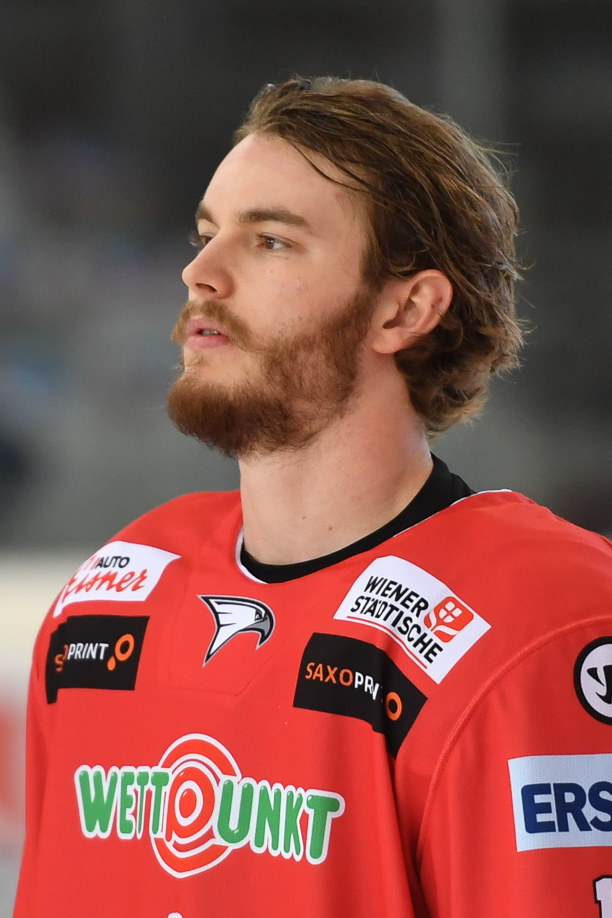
- Born: 11 May 1993 (age 32) Villach, Austria
- Height: 5 ft 10 in (178 cm)
- Weight: 190 lb (86 kg; 13 st 8 lb)
- Position: Centre
- Shoots: Left
- ICEHL team Former teams: EC VSV; EC Red Bull Salzburg; Västerås IK
- National team: Austria
- Playing career: 2012–present

Alexander Rauchenwald (born 11 May 1993) is an Austrian professional ice hockey centre playing for EC VSV of the ICE Hockey League (ICEHL).
