= John Hughes (ice hockey, born 1988) =

Canadian ice hockey player

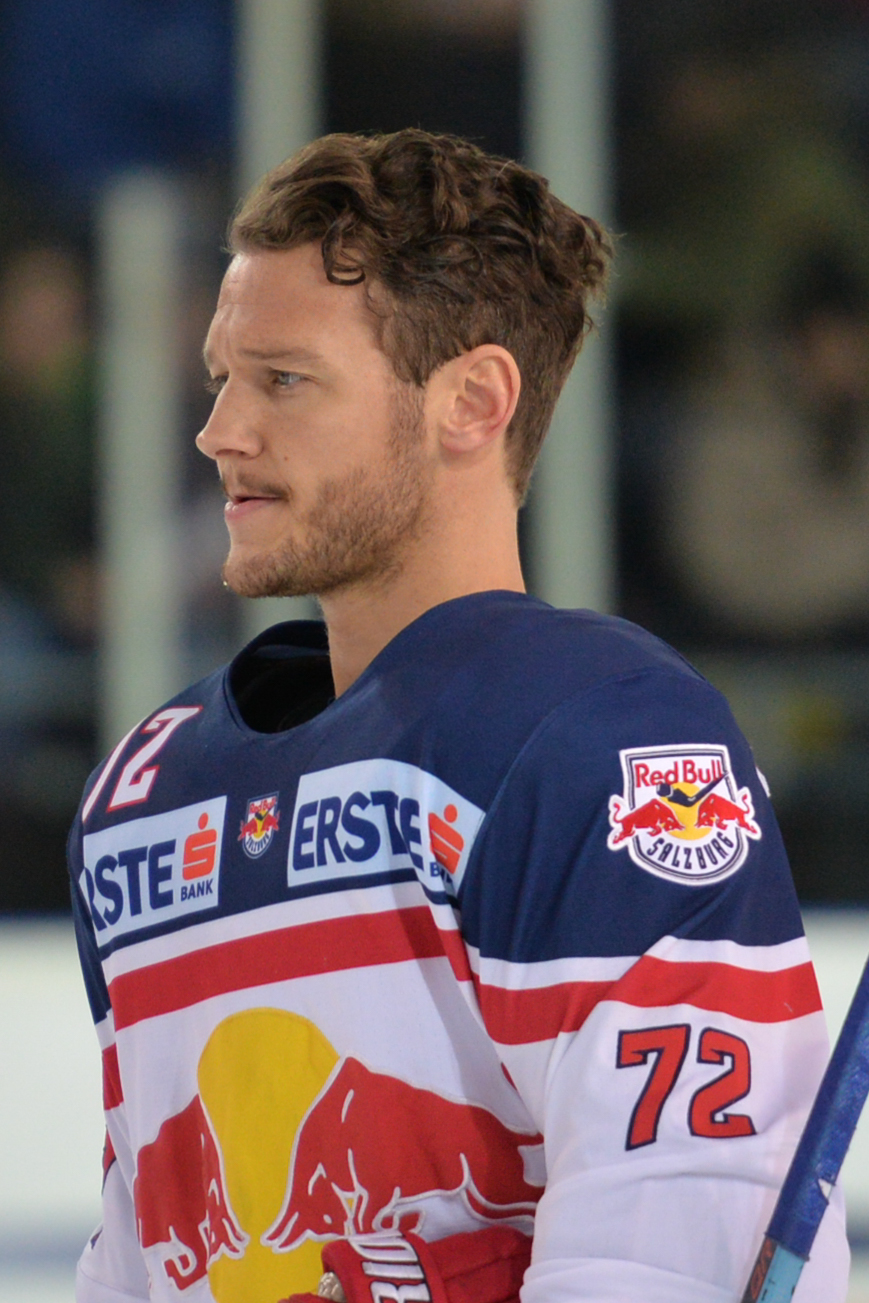
- Born: January 6, 1988 (age 38) Whitby, Ontario, Canada
- Height: 5 ft 11 in (180 cm)
- Weight: 165 lb (75 kg; 11 st 11 lb)
- Position: Centre
- Shoots: Right
- ICEHL team Former teams: EC VSV; Tappara; Hannover Indians; HDD Olimpija Ljubljana; EC Red Bull Salzburg
- NHL draft: Undrafted
- Playing career: 2008–present

John Hughes (born January 6, 1988) is a Canadian professional ice hockey Centre currently playing for EC VSV in the ICE Hockey League.

== Playing career ==
Hughes was taken 1st overall by the Belleville Bulls in the 2004 Ontario Hockey League (OHL) Priority Selection. After completing his major junior career in the OHL with the Bulls, and Brampton Battalion, he was the only player to be a 1st overall OHL Priority Selection to not go on to be picked in the NHL entry draft.

Hughes opted to forge a European career, first signing with the Austrian club, the EC Red Bull Salzburg of the EBEL. After a short stint in Finland and Germany with Tappara and the Hannover Indians, Hughes returned to the EBEL with Slovenian club, HDD Olimpija Ljubljana. In his first full season with Olimpija in the 2010–11 season, the skilled forward posted an impressive 64 points in 53 games, leading the league with 48 points, and to be selected as the EBEL rookie of the year.

Hughes bettered his initial success in the following 2011–12 season, to lead the EBEL in points scoring with 68 points in 50 games, and to be named the EBEL MVP with the Ron Kennedy Trophy. Hughes then signed a lucrative two-year contract with Austrian club, EC VSV, on May 2, 2012.

After leading the league for a second time with 85 points in 54 games in the last year of his contract with VSV in the 2013–14 season, Hughes opted to return to his first professional club, EC Red Bull Salzburg, with the lure of the Champions Hockey League on July 1, 2014.

== Awards and honours ==
Award	Year
OHL
Jack Ferguson Award	2004
Jim Mahon Memorial Trophy	2008
EBEL
Ron Kennedy Trophy	2012
