= 2009 IIHF World U18 Championship Division I =

Tournament details
- Host countries: Belarus; Italy
- Venues: 2 (in 2 host cities)
- Dates: 29 March – 4 April 2009; 6–12 April 2009
- Teams: 12

The 2009 IIHF World U18 Championship Division I was an international under-18 ice hockey competition organised by the International Ice Hockey Federation. Both Division I tournaments made up the second level of the 2009 IIHF World U18 Championships. The Group A tournament was played in Minsk, Belarus, and the Group B tournament was played in Asiago, Italy. Belarus and Latvia won the Group A and B tournaments respectively and gained promotion to the Top Division of the 2010 IIHF World U18 Championships.

== Group A ==
The Group A tournament was played in Minsk, Belarus at the Ice Palace from 6 to 12 April 2009.

=== Final standings ===
Pos	Team	Pld	W	OTW	OTL	L	GF	GA	GD	Pts	Promotion or relegation
1	Belarus	5	4	1	0	0	23	6	+17	14	Promoted to the 2010 Top Division
2	Poland	5	2	2	0	1	25	13	+12	10	
3	Hungary	5	3	0	1	1	19	18	+1	10	
4	Kazakhstan	5	2	0	1	2	16	21	−5	7	
5	Lithuania	5	1	0	1	3	13	16	−3	4	
6	Ukraine	5	0	0	0	5	7	29	−22	0	Relegated to the 2010 Division II

Source: IIHF

=== Results ===
All times are local.

April 6, 2009; 12:00	Ukraine	1–5	Lithuania	Ice Palace; Attendance: 2,900

	Referee: P Mikula (Czech Republic)
D Khanin (EQ) 36:48 / Goals / P Rulevicius (EQ) 05:03; D Streckis (EQ) 05:50; M Cerniauskas (EQ) 07:16; P Rulevicius (PP) 39:49; M Krikstanaitis (EQ) 52:17	Referee: P Mikula (Czech Republic)

April 6, 2009; 15:30	Poland	4–3 (OT)	Kazakhstan	Ice Palace; Attendance: 2,500

	Referee: B Holdsworth (Canada)
D Kapica (EQ) 02:03; P Kosidlo (EQ) 08:58; K Guzik (EQ) 26:49; K Guzik (EQ) 61:28 / Goals / M Zhabunin (PP) 11:11; A Tleubayev (EQ) 22:13; N Sidorenko (EQ) 45:12	Referee: B Holdsworth (Canada)

April 6, 2009; 19:00	Hungary	4–5 (SO)	Belarus	Ice Palace; Attendance: 3,700

	Referee: V Gashilov (Russia)
R Hardi (PP) 10:52; R Hardi (PP) 13:56; J Hari (EQ) 42:17; J Hari (EQ) 59:02 / Goals / E Nogachev (EQ) 17:55; N Suslo (SH) 25:05; A Kobus (EQ) 37:01; E Nogachev (PP) 59:44; A Korogoda (GWS) 65:00	Referee: V Gashilov (Russia)

April 7, 2009; 15:30	Lithuania	3–4	Hungary	Ice Palace; Attendance: 2,500

	Referee: T Salminen (Finland)
S Suchomlinas (EQ) 09:03; S Suchomlinas (PP) 32:39; L Rimkus (PP) 41:09 / Goals / A Pavuk (PP) 16:49; B Somogyi (SH) 35:56; B Nemes (EQ) 36:45; B Nemes (PP) 38:39	Referee: T Salminen (Finland)

April 7, 2009; 19:00	Belarus	4–1	Poland	Ice Palace; Attendance: 3,900

	Referee: P Mikula (Czech Republic)
K Gotovets (PP) 11:59; M Khoromando (EQ) 19:57; N Suslo (EQ) 48:08; A Kobus (PP) 59:59 / Goals / B Bychawski (PP) 56:55	Referee: P Mikula (Czech Republic)

April 8, 2009; 15:30	Kazakhstan	7–3	Ukraine	Ice Palace; Attendance: 2,900

	Referee: B Holdsworth (Canada)
A Petrov (EQ) 01:06; M Zhabunin (EQ) 03:24; T Morev (EQ) 24:07; Y Bondarenko (EQ) 33:27; Vologodsky (EQ) 38:14; A Tleubayev (EQ) 49:30; T Morev (EQ) 56:37 / Goals / S Palamarchuk (PP) 08:06; S Golovanov (EQ) 39:32; D Khanin (PP) 43:31	Referee: B Holdsworth (Canada)

April 9, 2009; 12:00	Hungary	0–9	Poland	Ice Palace; Attendance: 2,900

	Referee: V Gashilov (Russia)
Goals / J Wanacki (EQ) 06:56; D Piotrowicz (EQ) 09:36; K Guzik (PP) 15:52; B Neupauer (EQ) 20:19; M Bober (PP) 33:15; D Kapica (EQ) 46:06; D Kapica (EQ) 48:04; B Neupauer (EQ) 51:32; B Neupauer (EQ) 54:43	Referee: V Gashilov (Russia)

April 9, 2009; 15:30	Kazakhstan	4–2	Lithuania	Ice Palace; Attendance: 2,000

	Referee: B Holdsworth (Canada)
M Rakhmanov (PP) 14:15; V Ivashin (EQ) 17:18; M Zhabunin (EQ) 53:03; T Morev (ENG) 59:44 / Goals / P Rulevicius (PP) 27:31; S Suchomlinas (EQ) 54:59	Referee: B Holdsworth (Canada)

April 9, 2009; 19:00	Belarus	5–0	Ukraine	Ice Palace; Attendance: 3,900

	Referee: T Salminen (Finland)
A Korogoda (EQ) 03:26; R Malinovski (PP) 07:58; N Suslo (EQ) 13:52; I Karabanov (EQ) 56:29; I Sheremetiev (EQ) 56:46 / Goals	Referee: T Salminen (Finland)

April 10, 2009; 15:30	Lithuania	0–3	Belarus	Ice Palace; Attendance: 3,900

	Referee: V Gashilov (Russia)
Goals / V Zankovets (EQ) 03:13; V Markitski (EQ) 33:25; R Malinovski (PP) 53:06	Referee: V Gashilov (Russia)

April 11, 2009; 12:00	Poland	7–3	Ukraine	Ice Palace; Attendance: 2,000

	Referee: T Salminen (Finland)
D Piotrowicz (PP) 14:08; B Neupauer (EQ) 25:36; B Neupauer (EQ) 32:11; K Guzik (EQ) 40:31; K Guzik (EQ) 49:42; A Kowalczyk (EQ) 54:13; L Sosnierz (EQ) 59:05 / Goals / M Popov (PP) 19:07; M Korabchevsky (PP) 23:09; S Golovanov (PP) 48:54	Referee: T Salminen (Finland)

April 11, 2009; 15:30	Kazakhstan	1–6	Hungary	Ice Palace; Attendance: 2,000

	Referee: P Mikula (Czech Republic)
M Zhabunin (PP) 47:46 / Goals / Tamas Erdelyi (EQ) 10:18; B Nemes (EQ) 10:45; B Nemes (PP) 31:52; B Nemes (EQ) 57:08; H Strenk (EQ) 59:13; Tamas Erdelyi (PP) 59:49	Referee: P Mikula (Czech Republic)

April 12, 2009; 12:00	Lithuania	3–4 (OT)	Poland	Ice Palace; Attendance: 2,000

	Referee: V Gashilov (Russia)
D Streckis (PP) 05:33; A Korneiciuk (PP) 34:12; A Bendzuis (EQ) 47:45 / Goals / B Pociecha (PP) 15:57; K Guzik (PP) 18:07; J Wanacki (PP) 25:16; D Maciejewski (EQ) 60:56	Referee: V Gashilov (Russia)

April 12, 2009; 15:30	Ukraine	0–5	Hungary	Ice Palace; Attendance: 2,000

	Referee: T Salminen (Finland)
Goals / J Hari (EQ) 22:01; B Zalavari (PP) 28:06; I Gallo (PP) 41:17; A Nemeth (PP) 43:48; K Hentes (PP) 51:09	Referee: T Salminen (Finland)

April 12, 2009; 19:00	Belarus	6–1	Kazakhstan	Ice Palace; Attendance: 4,100

	Referee: B Holdworth (Canada)
A Korogoda (EQ) 06:24; I Karabanov (EQ) 09:45; E Nogachev (PP) 25:11; V Makritski (SH) 27:40; I Sheremetiev (EQ) 38:33; I Sheremetiev (EQ) 59:56 / Goals / M Rakhmanov (EQ) 47:43	Referee: B Holdworth (Canada)

== Group B ==
The Group B tournament was played in Asiago, Italy at PalaOdegar from 29 March to 4 April 2009.

=== Final standings ===
Pos	Team	Pld	W	OTW	OTL	L	GF	GA	GD	Pts	Promotion or relegation
1	Latvia	5	4	0	0	1	18	10	+8	12	Promoted to the 2010 Top Division
2	Denmark	5	3	0	1	1	15	7	+8	10	
3	Austria	5	2	2	0	1	21	20	+1	10	
4	France	5	1	1	1	2	15	17	−2	6	
5	Japan	5	0	2	1	2	13	16	−3	5	
6	Italy	5	0	0	2	3	8	20	−12	2	Relegated to the 2010 Division II

Source: IIHF

=== Results ===
All times are local.

March 29, 2009; 13:30	Japan	5–6 (OT)	Austria	PalaOdegar; Attendance: 200

	Referee: P Grecko (Slovakia)
Y Takami (EQ) 12:21; T Gorai (SH) 16:39; T Gorai (PP) 47:21; T Obara (PS) 56:24; T Gorai (EQ) 59:43 / Goals / A Haase (PP) 17:27; P Schneider (EQ) 38:17; M Pock (PP) 43:04; P Schneider (EQ) 53:21; M Brucker (EQ) 59:27; K Puschnik (PP) 64:00	Referee: P Grecko (Slovakia)

March 29, 2009; 17:00	France	4–3 (SO)	Denmark	PalaOdegar; Attendance: 600

	Referee: R van der Waarden (Netherlands)
V Barbero (PP) 32:12; T Franck (PP) 41:00; V Barbero (EQ) 55:29; R Gaborit (GWS) 65:00 / Goals / R Damgaard (EQ) 02:45; P Bjorkstrand (PP) 24:22; P Brugisser (EQ) 58:40	Referee: R van der Waarden (Netherlands)

March 29, 2009; 20:30	Italy	3–5	Latvia	PalaOdegar; Attendance: 1,700

	Referee: M Battimo (United States)
P Grandi (PP) 04:40; P Nicolao (EQ) 11:29; P Nicolao (EQ) 24:43 / Goals / N Semjonovs (EQ) 06:13; M Bicecskis (EQ) 22:57; E Biezais (PP) 28:03; A Mickevics (EQ) 30:47; N Kolesnikovs (PP) 45:41	Referee: M Battimo (United States)

March 30, 2009; 13:30	Austria	6–5	France	PalaOdegar; Attendance: 410

	Referee: M Battimo (United States)
J Schernthaner (EQ) 05:02; K Puschnik (PS) 27:20; C Sternat (EQ) 37:40; M Pock (PP) 39:43; K Puschnik (EQ) 44:01; K Puschnit (EQ) 57:43 / Goals / V Claireaux (EQ) 21:04; N Ritz (EQ) 25:40; C Betrand (EQ) 27:57; R Gaborit (EQ) 36:28; V Vitton Mea (PP) 47:01	Referee: M Battimo (United States)

March 30, 2009; 17:00	Latvia	5–2	Japan	PalaOdegar; Attendance: 520

	Referee: R van der Waarden (Netherlands)
E Kalns (PP) 18:31; E Leitans (PP) 25:58; J Upitis (EQ) 28:39; N Semjonovs (PP) 36:49; V Dobrenkijs (PS) 43:18 / Goals / H Satoh (EQ) 55:23; H Satoh (PP) 57:26	Referee: R van der Waarden (Netherlands)

March 30, 2009; 20:30	Denmark	7–0	Italy	PalaOdegar; Attendance: 1,450

	Referee: Viktor Trilar (Slovenia)
F Scheel (EQ) 02:27; M Mieritz (PP) 05:41; S Nielsen (EQ) 06:47; M Mieritz (EQ) 28:11; P Bjorkstrand (EQ) 41:13; A Poulsen (PP) 44:05; J Jensen (EQ) 57:35 / Goals	Referee: Viktor Trilar (Slovenia)

April 1, 2009; 13:30	Denmark	1–0	Japan	PalaOdegar; Attendance: 310

	Referee: P Grecko (Slovakia)
A Poulsen (EQ) 12:11 / Goals	Referee: P Grecko (Slovakia)

April 1, 2009; 17:30	Latvia	3–4	Austria	PalaOdegar; Attendance: 360

	Referee: V Trilar (Slovenia)
R Vigners (PP) 11:53; A Mickevics (PP) 21:41; R. Ķēniņš (EQ) 25:33 / Goals / A Martirosian (PP) 31:43; M Brucker (PP) 32:26; N Hartl (PP) 43:42; A Martirosian (PP) 49:14	Referee: V Trilar (Slovenia)

April 1, 2009; 20:30	France	2–1	Italy	PalaOdegar; Attendance: 1,150

	Referee: R van der Waarden (Netherlands)
R Gutierrez (EQ) 14:22; N Ritz (EQ) 21:23 / Goals / M Presti (SH) 52:39	Referee: R van der Waarden (Netherlands)

April 2, 2009; 13:30	Austria	1–4	Denmark	PalaOdegar; Attendance: 480

	Referee: M Battimo (United States)
G Waldhauser (EQ) 47:28 / Goals / S Pedersen (PP) 34:31; S Svendsen (EQ) 35:43; A Poulsen (EQ) 58:26	Referee: M Battimo (United States)

April 2, 2009; 17:00	Latvia	3–1	France	PalaOdegar; Attendance: 440

	Referee: V Trilar (Slovenia)
M Bicevskis (EQ) 03:28; R. Ķēniņš (EQ) 35:50; R Vigners (ENG) 59:40 / Goals / V Barbero (PP) 06:43	Referee: V Trilar (Slovenia)

April 2, 2009; 20:30	Italy	1–2 (SO)	Japan	PalaOdegar; Attendance: 1550

	Referee: P Grecko (Slovakia)
A Frei (EQ) 18:38 / Goals / J Yamada (EQ) 09:40; T Obara (GWS) 65:00	Referee: P Grecko (Slovakia)

April 4, 2009; 13:30	Denmark	0–2	Latvia	PalaOdegar; Attendance: 800

	Referee: P Grecko (Slovakia)
Goals / E Biezais (EQ) 10:44; R. Ķēniņš (ENG) 59:47	Referee: P Grecko (Slovakia)

April 4, 2009; 17:00	Japan	4–3 (SO)	France	PalaOdegar; Attendance: 570

	Referee: V Trilar (Slovenia)
S Sawazaki (EQ) 16:07; S Iwatsuki (EQ) 30:58; T Gorai (PP) 47:22; J Yamada (GWS) 65:00 / Goals / A Rech (EQ) 13:27; V Barbero (SH) 21:34; V Barbero (PP) 42:27	Referee: V Trilar (Slovenia)

April 4, 2009; 20:30	Austria	4–3 (SO)	Italy	PalaOdegar; Attendance: 2,250

	Referee: Maximiliano Battimo (United States)
K Komarek (EQ) 03:29; P Schneider (EQ) 04:46; M Wilfan (PP) 41:03; P Schneider (GWS) 65:00 / Goals / S Piva (PP) 02:19; M Felderer (EQ); M Presti (EQ) 50:28	Referee: Maximiliano Battimo (United States)

=== Leading scorers ===
Player	Country	GP	G	A	Pts	+/-	PIM
Bartlomiej Neupauer	Poland	5	5	6	11	+8	6
Kacper Guzik	Poland	5	6	4	10	+7	35
Benjamin Nemes	Hungary	5	5	4	9	+1	0
Damian Kapica	Poland	5	3	6	9	+8	2
Kevin Puschnik	Austria	5	4	4	8	+0	4
Richard Hardi	Hungary	5	2	6	8	+0	4
János Hári	Hungary	5	3	4	7	+3	6
Dovydas Streckis	Lithuania	5	2	5	7	+0	10
Victor Barbero	France	5	5	1	6	−1	6
Nikolai Suslo	Belarus	5	3	3	6	+5	6

=== Top goaltenders ===
Player	Country	GP	Min	GAA	SV%	SO
Lasse Jensen	Denmark	4	230:48	0.50	.980	2
Andrei Novikov	Belarus	3	150:19	0.80	.956	2
Bartlomiej Niesluchowski	Poland	3	181:28	1.98	.934	1
Jānis Kalniņš	Latvia	3	144:43	1.66	.933	1
Ren Yamaguchi	Japan	4	253:45	2.60	.929	0

== See also ==
- 2009 IIHF World U18 Championships
- 2009 IIHF World U18 Championship Division II
- 2009 IIHF World U18 Championship Division III
