= 2018 IIHF World Championship rosters =

Championship rosters

Each team's roster consisted of at least 15 skaters (forwards and defencemen) and two goaltenders, and at most 22 skaters and three goaltenders. All 16 participating nations, through the confirmation of their respective national associations, had to submit a roster by the first IIHF directorate meeting.

Age and team as of 4 May 2018.

== Group A ==
=== Austria ===
A 29-player roster was announced on 24 April 2018. It was reduced to 27 on 30 April 2018.

Head coach: Roger Bader

No.	Pos.	Name	Height	Weight	Birthdate	Team
3	F	Peter Schneider	1.82 m (6 ft 0 in)	87 kg (192 lb)	4 April 1991 (aged 27)	(Austria) Vienna Capitals
7	F	Brian Lebler – A	1.91 m (6 ft 3 in)	96 kg (212 lb)	16 July 1988 (aged 29)	(Austria) EHC Black Wings Linz
9	F	Alexander Rauchenwald	1.79 m (5 ft 10 in)	85 kg (187 lb)	11 May 1993 (aged 24)	(Austria) EC Red Bull Salzburg
11	F	Lukas Haudum	1.83 m (6 ft 0 in)	83 kg (183 lb)	May 21, 1997 (aged 20)	(Sweden) Malmö Redhawks
12	F	Michael Raffl	1.84 m (6 ft 0 in)	88 kg (194 lb)	December 1, 1988 (aged 29)	(United States) Philadelphia Flyers
13	F	Patrick Obrist	1.85 m (6 ft 1 in)	90 kg (200 lb)	February 27, 1993 (aged 25)	(Switzerland) Kloten Flyers
14	D	Patrick Peter	1.83 m (6 ft 0 in)	90 kg (200 lb)	January 27, 1994 (aged 24)	(Austria) Vienna Capitals
16	F	Dominic Zwerger	1.83 m (6 ft 0 in)	93 kg (205 lb)	July 16, 1996 (aged 21)	(Switzerland) HC Ambrì-Piotta
17	F	Manuel Ganahl – A	1.82 m (6 ft 0 in)	78 kg (172 lb)	July 12, 1990 (aged 27)	(Austria) EC KAC
22	D	Stefan Ulmer	1.75 m (5 ft 9 in)	81 kg (179 lb)	December 1, 1990 (aged 27)	(Switzerland) HC Lugano
23	F	Fabio Hofer	1.70 m (5 ft 7 in)	75 kg (165 lb)	January 23, 1991 (aged 27)	(Austria) EHC Black Wings Linz
24	D	Steven Strong	1.85 m (6 ft 1 in)	87 kg (192 lb)	February 16, 1993 (aged 25)	(Austria) EC KAC
27	F	Thomas Hundertpfund – C	1.90 m (6 ft 3 in)	97 kg (214 lb)	December 14, 1989 (aged 28)	(Austria) EC KAC
28	D	Martin Schumnig	1.81 m (5 ft 11 in)	78 kg (172 lb)	July 28, 1989 (aged 28)	(Austria) EC KAC
29	G	Bernhard Starkbaum	1.86 m (6 ft 1 in)	89 kg (196 lb)	February 19, 1986 (aged 32)	(Austria) EC Red Bull Salzburg
30	G	David Kickert	1.87 m (6 ft 2 in)	77 kg (170 lb)	March 16, 1994 (aged 24)	(Austria) Vienna Capitals
31	G	David Madlener	1.89 m (6 ft 2 in)	88 kg (194 lb)	March 31, 1992 (aged 26)	(Austria) EC KAC
41	D	Mario Altmann	1.94 m (6 ft 4 in)	98 kg (216 lb)	November 4, 1986 (aged 31)	(Austria) EHC Black Wings Linz
42	D	Layne Viveiros	1.83 m (6 ft 0 in)	88 kg (194 lb)	August 4, 1995 (aged 22)	(Austria) EC Red Bull Salzburg
51	F	Daniel Woger	1.85 m (6 ft 1 in)	82 kg (181 lb)	February 25, 1988 (aged 30)	(Austria) Graz 99ers
61	F	Patrick Spannring	1.83 m (6 ft 0 in)	90 kg (200 lb)	November 6, 1990 (aged 27)	(Austria) EHC Black Wings Linz
63	D	Markus Schlacher	1.85 m (6 ft 1 in)	87 kg (192 lb)	August 23, 1987 (aged 30)	(Austria) EC VSV
67	F	Konstantin Komarek	1.79 m (5 ft 10 in)	88 kg (194 lb)	November 8, 1992 (aged 25)	(Sweden) Karlskrona HK
91	D	Dominique Heinrich	1.75 m (5 ft 9 in)	76 kg (168 lb)	July 31, 1990 (aged 27)	(Austria) EC Red Bull Salzburg
92	D	Clemens Unterweger	1.83 m (6 ft 0 in)	78 kg (172 lb)	April 1, 1992 (aged 26)	(Austria) Graz 99ers

=== Belarus ===
Head coach: Dave Lewis was the acting head coach until 8 May 2018, after that Sergei Pushkov took over.

No.	Pos.	Name	Height	Weight	Birthdate	Team
1	G	Mikhail Karnaukhov	1.85 m (6 ft 1 in)	80 kg (180 lb)	February 22, 1994 (aged 24)	(Belarus) HC Dinamo Minsk
7	D	Vladimir Denisov	1.81 m (5 ft 11 in)	94 kg (207 lb)	June 29, 1984 (aged 33)	(Belarus) HC Dinamo Minsk
9	D	Roman Dyukov	1.87 m (6 ft 2 in)	90 kg (200 lb)	September 29, 1995 (aged 22)	(Kazakhstan) Saryarka Karagandy
10	F	Pavel Razvadovsky	1.77 m (5 ft 10 in)	85 kg (187 lb)	August 7, 1989 (aged 28)	(Belarus) Yunost Minsk
13	F	Sergei Drozd	1.81 m (5 ft 11 in)	77 kg (170 lb)	April 14, 1990 (aged 28)	(Belarus) HC Dinamo Minsk
14	D	Yevgeni Lisovets	1.83 m (6 ft 0 in)	90 kg (200 lb)	November 12, 1994 (aged 23)	(Belarus) HC Dinamo Minsk
15	F	Artyom Demkov	1.74 m (5 ft 9 in)	81 kg (179 lb)	September 26, 1989 (aged 28)	(Belarus) HC Shakhtyor Soligorsk
16	F	Geoff Platt	1.76 m (5 ft 9 in)	82 kg (181 lb)	July 10, 1985 (aged 32)	(Russia) HC CSKA Moscow
17	F	Yegor Sharangovich	1.85 m (6 ft 1 in)	87 kg (192 lb)	June 6, 1998 (aged 19)	(Belarus) HC Dinamo Minsk
18	D	Kristian Khenkel	1.82 m (6 ft 0 in)	85 kg (187 lb)	July 11, 1995 (aged 22)	(Belarus) HC Dinamo Minsk
23	D	Nikita Ustinenko	1.86 m (6 ft 1 in)	78 kg (172 lb)	April 22, 1995 (aged 23)	(Belarus) Yunost Minsk
28	F	Oleksandr Materukhin	1.83 m (6 ft 0 in)	90 kg (200 lb)	October 17, 1981 (aged 36)	(Belarus) HC Shakhtyor Soligorsk
31	G	Ivan Kulbakov	1.85 m (6 ft 1 in)	78 kg (172 lb)	September 18, 1996 (aged 21)	(United States) Cleveland Monsters
51	D	Stepan Falkovsky	2.00 m (6 ft 7 in)	102 kg (225 lb)	December 18, 1996 (aged 21)	(United States) Ontario Reign
55	D	Pavel Vorobey	1.90 m (6 ft 3 in)	90 kg (200 lb)	September 10, 1997 (aged 20)	(China) Kunlun Red Star
70	F	Charles Linglet	1.88 m (6 ft 2 in)	92 kg (203 lb)	June 22, 1982 (aged 35)	(Belarus) HC Dinamo Minsk
71	F	Alexander Pavlovich – C	1.84 m (6 ft 0 in)	86 kg (190 lb)	July 12, 1988 (aged 29)	(Belarus) HC Dinamo Minsk
74	F	Artyom Levsha	1.77 m (5 ft 10 in)	78 kg (172 lb)	September 24, 1992 (aged 25)	(Belarus) HK Neman Grodno
77	F	Alexander Kitarov – A	1.90 m (6 ft 3 in)	96 kg (212 lb)	June 18, 1987 (aged 30)	(Belarus) HC Dinamo Minsk
79	G	Vitali Trus	1.83 m (6 ft 0 in)	80 kg (180 lb)	June 24, 1988 (aged 29)	(Belarus) HK Neman Grodno
82	F	Artyom Kisly	1.76 m (5 ft 9 in)	82 kg (181 lb)	April 28, 1989 (aged 29)	(Belarus) HK Neman Grodno
84	F	Maxim Sushko	1.82 m (6 ft 0 in)	81 kg (179 lb)	February 10, 1999 (aged 19)	(Canada) Owen Sound Attack
88	F	Evgeni Kovyrshin	1.78 m (5 ft 10 in)	78 kg (172 lb)	January 25, 1986 (aged 32)	(Belarus) HC Dinamo Minsk
89	D	Dmitry Korobov – A	1.90 m (6 ft 3 in)	108 kg (238 lb)	March 12, 1989 (aged 29)	(Belarus) HC Dinamo Minsk
91	F	Artur Gavrus	1.79 m (5 ft 10 in)	87 kg (192 lb)	January 3, 1994 (aged 24)	(Belarus) Dinamo-Molodechno

=== Czech Republic ===
A 32-player roster was announced on 26 April 2018. It was down to 26 on 29 April 2018.

Head coach: Josef Jandač

No.	Pos.	Name	Height	Weight	Birthdate	Team
3	D	Radko Gudas – A	1.83 m (6 ft 0 in)	93 kg (205 lb)	June 5, 1990 (aged 27)	(United States) Philadelphia Flyers
8	D	Libor Šulák	1.89 m (6 ft 2 in)	86 kg (190 lb)	March 4, 1994 (aged 24)	(United States) Grand Rapids Griffins
9	D	David Sklenička	1.80 m (5 ft 11 in)	82 kg (181 lb)	September 8, 1996 (aged 21)	(Czech Republic) HC Plzeň
10	F	Roman Červenka – C	1.82 m (6 ft 0 in)	89 kg (196 lb)	December 10, 1985 (aged 32)	(Switzerland) HC Fribourg-Gottéron
11	F	Andrej Nestrašil	1.90 m (6 ft 3 in)	91 kg (201 lb)	February 22, 1991 (aged 27)	(Russia) Neftekhimik Nizhnekamsk
12	F	Radek Faksa	1.91 m (6 ft 3 in)	96 kg (212 lb)	September 1, 1994 (aged 23)	(United States) Dallas Stars
14	F	Tomáš Plekanec – A	1.78 m (5 ft 10 in)	90 kg (200 lb)	October 31, 1982 (aged 35)	(Canada) Montreal Canadiens
17	D	Filip Hronek	1.82 m (6 ft 0 in)	75 kg (165 lb)	November 2, 1997 (aged 20)	(United States) Grand Rapids Griffins
18	F	Dominik Kubalík	1.87 m (6 ft 2 in)	86 kg (190 lb)	August 21, 1995 (aged 22)	(Czech Republic) HC Plzeň
23	F	Dmitrij Jaškin	1.90 m (6 ft 3 in)	90 kg (200 lb)	March 23, 1993 (aged 25)	(United States) St. Louis Blues
26	F	Michal Řepík	1.79 m (5 ft 10 in)	87 kg (192 lb)	December 31, 1988 (aged 29)	(Czech Republic) HC Sparta Praha
30	G	Dominik Hrachovina	1.79 m (5 ft 10 in)	85 kg (187 lb)	August 29, 1994 (aged 23)	(Finland) Tappara
33	G	Pavel Francouz	1.82 m (6 ft 0 in)	81 kg (179 lb)	June 3, 1990 (aged 27)	(Russia) Traktor Chelyabinsk
36	D	Jakub Krejčík	1.87 m (6 ft 2 in)	90 kg (200 lb)	June 25, 1991 (aged 26)	(Czech Republic) HC Kometa Brno
39	G	David Rittich	1.91 m (6 ft 3 in)	92 kg (203 lb)	August 19, 1992 (aged 25)	(Canada) Calgary Flames
46	F	David Krejčí	1.83 m (6 ft 0 in)	80 kg (180 lb)	April 28, 1986 (aged 32)	(United States) Boston Bruins
47	D	Michal Jordán	1.85 m (6 ft 1 in)	90 kg (200 lb)	July 17, 1990 (aged 27)	(Russia) Amur Khabarovsk
51	F	Roman Horák	1.82 m (6 ft 0 in)	74 kg (163 lb)	May 21, 1991 (aged 26)	(Russia) HC Vityaz
60	D	Michal Moravčík	1.94 m (6 ft 4 in)	96 kg (212 lb)	July 12, 1994 (aged 23)	(Czech Republic) HC Plzeň
61	D	Adam Polášek	1.90 m (6 ft 3 in)	94 kg (207 lb)	July 12, 1991 (aged 26)	(Russia) HC Sochi
71	F	Tomáš Hyka	1.80 m (5 ft 11 in)	76 kg (168 lb)	March 23, 1993 (aged 25)	(United States) Vegas Golden Knights
72	F	Filip Chytil	1.84 m (6 ft 0 in)	81 kg (179 lb)	May 9, 1999 (aged 18)	(United States) Hartford Wolf Pack
88	F	David Pastrňák	1.82 m (6 ft 0 in)	82 kg (181 lb)	May 25, 1996 (aged 21)	(United States) Boston Bruins
90	F	Robert Kousal	1.86 m (6 ft 1 in)	90 kg (200 lb)	July 10, 1990 (aged 27)	(Switzerland) HC Davos
98	F	Martin Nečas	1.84 m (6 ft 0 in)	76 kg (168 lb)	January 15, 1999 (aged 19)	(Czech Republic) HC Kometa Brno

=== France ===
A 26-player roster was announced on 28 April 2018.

Head coach: Dave Henderson

No.	Pos.	Name	Height	Weight	Birthdate	Team
3	D	Jonathan Janil	1.89 m (6 ft 2 in)	93 kg (205 lb)	September 24, 1987 (aged 30)	(France) Boxers de Bordeaux
4	D	Antonin Manavian	1.91 m (6 ft 3 in)	98 kg (216 lb)	April 26, 1987 (aged 31)	(Hungary) Alba Volán Székesfehérvár
8	D	Hugo Gallet	1.92 m (6 ft 4 in)	94 kg (207 lb)	June 20, 1997 (aged 20)	(Finland) HC TPS
9	F	Damien Fleury – A	1.80 m (5 ft 11 in)	84 kg (185 lb)	February 1, 1986 (aged 32)	(Germany) Schwenninger Wild Wings
12	F	Valentin Claireaux	1.80 m (5 ft 11 in)	88 kg (194 lb)	April 5, 1991 (aged 27)	(Finland) Lukko
14	F	Stéphane Da Costa – C	1.81 m (5 ft 11 in)	81 kg (179 lb)	July 11, 1989 (aged 28)	(Switzerland) Genève-Servette HC
15	F	Maurin Bouvet	1.82 m (6 ft 0 in)	78 kg (172 lb)	May 28, 1995 (aged 22)	(France) Rapaces de Gap
18	D	Yohann Auvitu	1.82 m (6 ft 0 in)	89 kg (196 lb)	July 27, 1989 (aged 28)	(Canada) Edmonton Oilers
23	F	Guillaume Leclerc	1.73 m (5 ft 8 in)	82 kg (181 lb)	February 20, 1996 (aged 22)	(France) Brûleurs de Loups
25	F	Nicolas Ritz	1.80 m (5 ft 11 in)	87 kg (192 lb)	February 26, 1992 (aged 26)	(France) Dragons de Rouen
27	F	Loïc Lampérier	1.87 m (6 ft 2 in)	90 kg (200 lb)	August 7, 1989 (aged 28)	(France) Dragons de Rouen
28	D	Damien Raux	1.78 m (5 ft 10 in)	82 kg (181 lb)	November 3, 1984 (aged 33)	(France) Rapaces de Gap
29	F	Floran Douay	1.91 m (6 ft 3 in)	98 kg (216 lb)	February 7, 1995 (aged 23)	(Switzerland) Genève-Servette HC
33	G	Ronan Quemener	1.86 m (6 ft 1 in)	86 kg (190 lb)	February 13, 1988 (aged 30)	(France) Boxers de Bordeaux
37	G	Sebastian Ylönen	1.86 m (6 ft 1 in)	84 kg (185 lb)	July 3, 1991 (aged 26)	(Finland) Jokipojat
38	D	Thomas Thiry	1.91 m (6 ft 3 in)	98 kg (216 lb)	September 9, 1997 (aged 20)	(Switzerland) EV Zug
49	G	Florian Hardy	1.83 m (6 ft 0 in)	83 kg (183 lb)	February 8, 1985 (aged 33)	(France) Ducs d'Angers
62	D	Florian Chakiachvili	1.87 m (6 ft 2 in)	87 kg (192 lb)	March 18, 1992 (aged 26)	(France) Dragons de Rouen
63	F	Alexandre Texier	1.85 m (6 ft 1 in)	87 kg (192 lb)	September 13, 1999 (aged 18)	(Finland) KalPa
71	F	Anthony Guttig	1.86 m (6 ft 1 in)	87 kg (192 lb)	October 30, 1988 (aged 29)	(France) Dragons de Rouen
72	F	Jordann Perret	1.78 m (5 ft 10 in)	82 kg (181 lb)	October 15, 1994 (aged 23)	(Czech Republic) HC Dynamo Pardubice
77	F	Sacha Treille	1.94 m (6 ft 4 in)	95 kg (209 lb)	November 6, 1987 (aged 30)	(Czech Republic) HC Dynamo Pardubice
80	F	Teddy Da Costa	1.79 m (5 ft 10 in)	85 kg (187 lb)	February 17, 1986 (aged 32)	(Poland) KS Cracovia
81	F	Anthony Rech	1.80 m (5 ft 11 in)	85 kg (187 lb)	July 9, 1992 (aged 25)	(Germany) Schwenninger Wild Wings
84	D	Kévin Hecquefeuille – A	1.81 m (5 ft 11 in)	84 kg (185 lb)	November 20, 1984 (aged 33)	(Sweden) IK Pantern

=== Russia ===
A 28-player roster was announced on 24 April 2018. It was cut to 25 players on 1 May 2018.

Head coach: Ilya Vorobiev

No.	Pos.	Name	Height	Weight	Birthdate	Team
3	D	Dinar Khafizullin	1.81 m (5 ft 11 in)	84 kg (185 lb)	January 5, 1989 (aged 29)	(Russia) SKA Saint Petersburg
4	D	Vladislav Gavrikov	1.90 m (6 ft 3 in)	97 kg (214 lb)	November 21, 1995 (aged 22)	(Russia) SKA Saint Petersburg
7	F	Kirill Kaprizov	1.78 m (5 ft 10 in)	87 kg (192 lb)	April 26, 1997 (aged 21)	(Russia) CSKA Moscow
11	F	Sergei Andronov – A	1.88 m (6 ft 2 in)	86 kg (190 lb)	July 19, 1989 (aged 28)	(Russia) CSKA Moscow
13	F	Pavel Datsyuk – C	1.80 m (5 ft 11 in)	88 kg (194 lb)	July 20, 1978 (aged 39)	(Russia) SKA Saint Petersburg
15	F	Artem Anisimov	1.93 m (6 ft 4 in)	86 kg (190 lb)	May 24, 1988 (aged 29)	(United States) Chicago Blackhawks
19	F	Pavel Buchnevich	1.88 m (6 ft 2 in)	88 kg (194 lb)	April 17, 1995 (aged 23)	(United States) New York Rangers
22	D	Nikita Zaitsev	1.89 m (6 ft 2 in)	89 kg (196 lb)	October 29, 1991 (aged 26)	(Canada) Ottawa Senators
25	F	Mikhail Grigorenko	1.89 m (6 ft 2 in)	95 kg (209 lb)	May 16, 1994 (aged 23)	(Russia) CSKA Moscow
29	F	Ilya Kablukov	1.89 m (6 ft 2 in)	88 kg (194 lb)	January 18, 1988 (aged 30)	(Russia) SKA Saint Petersburg
30	G	Igor Shestyorkin	1.85 m (6 ft 1 in)	85 kg (187 lb)	December 30, 1995 (aged 22)	(Russia) SKA Saint Petersburg
31	G	Ilya Sorokin	1.88 m (6 ft 2 in)	78 kg (172 lb)	August 4, 1995 (aged 22)	(Russia) CSKA Moscow
41	F	Nikita Soshnikov	1.81 m (5 ft 11 in)	85 kg (187 lb)	October 14, 1993 (aged 24)	(United States) St. Louis Blues
44	D	Egor Yakovlev	1.82 m (6 ft 0 in)	83 kg (183 lb)	September 17, 1991 (aged 26)	(Russia) SKA Saint Petersburg
51	D	Alexei Bereglazov	1.94 m (6 ft 4 in)	92 kg (203 lb)	April 20, 1994 (aged 24)	(Russia) Metallurg Magnitogorsk
55	D	Bogdan Kiselevich	1.84 m (6 ft 0 in)	94 kg (207 lb)	February 14, 1990 (aged 28)	(Russia) CSKA Moscow
63	F	Evgenii Dadonov – A	1.79 m (5 ft 10 in)	84 kg (185 lb)	March 12, 1989 (aged 29)	(United States) Florida Panthers
66	F	Ilya Mikheyev	1.89 m (6 ft 2 in)	88 kg (194 lb)	October 10, 1994 (aged 23)	(Russia) Avangard Omsk
78	F	Maxim Mamin	1.88 m (6 ft 2 in)	91 kg (201 lb)	January 13, 1995 (aged 23)	(United States) Florida Panthers
83	G	Vasily Koshechkin	2.00 m (6 ft 7 in)	110 kg (240 lb)	March 27, 1983 (aged 35)	(Russia) Metallurg Magnitogorsk
87	F	Maxim Shalunov	1.93 m (6 ft 4 in)	90 kg (200 lb)	January 31, 1993 (aged 25)	(Russia) CSKA Moscow
88	D	Nikita Tryamkin	2.02 m (6 ft 8 in)	116 kg (256 lb)	August 30, 1994 (aged 23)	(Russia) Avtomobilist Yekaterinburg
89	D	Nikita Nesterov	1.80 m (5 ft 11 in)	83 kg (183 lb)	March 28, 1993 (aged 25)	(Russia) CSKA Moscow
94	F	Alexander Barabanov	1.79 m (5 ft 10 in)	89 kg (196 lb)	June 17, 1994 (aged 23)	(Russia) SKA Saint Petersburg
97	F	Nikita Gusev	1.78 m (5 ft 10 in)	76 kg (168 lb)	July 8, 1992 (aged 25)	(Russia) SKA Saint Petersburg

=== Slovakia ===
A 27-player roster was announced on 26 April 2018. It was 25 players on 29 April 2018.

Head coach: Craig Ramsay

No.	Pos.	Name	Height	Weight	Birthdate	Team
1	G	Marek Čiliak	1.84 m (6 ft 0 in)	88 kg (194 lb)	April 2, 1990 (aged 28)	(Czech Republic) HC Kometa Brno
2	D	Andrej Sekera – C	1.83 m (6 ft 0 in)	91 kg (201 lb)	June 8, 1986 (aged 31)	(United States) Dallas Stars
3	D	Adam Jánošík	1.80 m (5 ft 11 in)	80 kg (180 lb)	September 7, 1992 (aged 25)	(Czech Republic) HC Bílí Tygři Liberec
6	F	Lukáš Cingeľ	1.86 m (6 ft 1 in)	88 kg (194 lb)	October 6, 1992 (aged 25)	(Czech Republic) Mountfield HK
7	D	Mário Grman	1.85 m (6 ft 1 in)	89 kg (196 lb)	April 11, 1997 (aged 21)	(Czech Republic) Piráti Chomutov
12	F	Dávid Bondra	1.80 m (5 ft 11 in)	86 kg (190 lb)	August 26, 1992 (aged 25)	(Slovakia) HK Poprad
13	F	Tomáš Jurčo	1.88 m (6 ft 2 in)	85 kg (187 lb)	December 28, 1992 (aged 25)	(United States) Rockford IceHogs
17	F	Dávid Buc	1.87 m (6 ft 2 in)	94 kg (207 lb)	January 22, 1987 (aged 31)	(Slovakia) HK Poprad
18	F	Andrej Kudrna	1.89 m (6 ft 2 in)	89 kg (196 lb)	May 11, 1991 (aged 26)	(Czech Republic) HC Sparta Praha
19	F	Michal Krištof	1.76 m (5 ft 9 in)	72 kg (159 lb)	October 11, 1993 (aged 24)	(Slovakia) HK Nitra
25	F	Marek Hovorka	1.78 m (5 ft 10 in)	82 kg (181 lb)	October 8, 1984 (aged 33)	(Slovakia) HC Košice
27	F	Ladislav Nagy – A	1.79 m (5 ft 10 in)	87 kg (192 lb)	June 1, 1979 (aged 38)	(Slovakia) HC Košice
28	F	Pavol Skalický	1.95 m (6 ft 5 in)	94 kg (207 lb)	October 9, 1995 (aged 22)	(Slovakia) HC ’05 Banská Bystrica
30	G	Denis Godla	1.80 m (5 ft 11 in)	79 kg (174 lb)	April 4, 1995 (aged 23)	(Finland) KalPa
33	F	Juraj Mikúš	1.87 m (6 ft 2 in)	91 kg (201 lb)	February 22, 1987 (aged 31)	(Czech Republic) HC Litvínov
42	G	Patrik Rybár	1.90 m (6 ft 3 in)	80 kg (180 lb)	November 9, 1993 (aged 24)	(Czech Republic) Mountfield HK
51	D	Dominik Graňák – A	1.82 m (6 ft 0 in)	81 kg (179 lb)	June 11, 1983 (aged 34)	(Czech Republic) Mountfield HK
56	D	Michal Čajkovský	1.92 m (6 ft 4 in)	107 kg (236 lb)	May 6, 1992 (aged 25)	(Russia) Avtomobilist Yekaterinburg
62	D	Christián Jaroš	1.92 m (6 ft 4 in)	97 kg (214 lb)	April 2, 1996 (aged 22)	(Canada) Ottawa Senators
65	F	Tomáš Marcinko	1.94 m (6 ft 4 in)	96 kg (212 lb)	April 11, 1988 (aged 30)	(Czech Republic) HC Oceláři Třinec
66	D	Martin Fehérváry	1.86 m (6 ft 1 in)	86 kg (190 lb)	October 6, 1999 (aged 18)	(Sweden) IK Oskarshamn
71	D	Marek Ďaloga	1.94 m (6 ft 4 in)	86 kg (190 lb)	March 10, 1989 (aged 29)	(Czech Republic) HC Sparta Praha
83	F	Martin Bakoš	1.88 m (6 ft 2 in)	90 kg (200 lb)	April 18, 1990 (aged 28)	(Czech Republic) HC Bílí Tygři Liberec
87	F	Marcel Haščák	1.82 m (6 ft 0 in)	93 kg (205 lb)	February 3, 1987 (aged 31)	(Czech Republic) HC Kometa Brno
88	F	Patrik Svitana	1.80 m (5 ft 11 in)	88 kg (194 lb)	July 10, 1988 (aged 29)	(Slovakia) HK Poprad

=== Sweden ===
A 25-player roster was announced on 29 April 2018. Filip Forsberg and Mattias Ekholm were added on May 14.

Head coach: Rikard Grönborg

No.	Pos.	Name	Height	Weight	Birthdate	Team
3	D	John Klingberg – A	1.88 m (6 ft 2 in)	82 kg (181 lb)	August 14, 1992 (aged 25)	(United States) Dallas Stars
4	D	Mattias Ekholm	1.93 m (6 ft 4 in)	98 kg (216 lb)	May 24, 1990 (aged 27)	(United States) Nashville Predators
5	D	Mikael Wikstrand	1.88 m (6 ft 2 in)	89 kg (196 lb)	November 5, 1993 (aged 24)	(Sweden) Färjestad BK
6	D	Adam Larsson	1.91 m (6 ft 3 in)	93 kg (205 lb)	November 12, 1992 (aged 25)	(Canada) Edmonton Oilers
9	F	Adrian Kempe	1.87 m (6 ft 2 in)	85 kg (187 lb)	September 13, 1996 (aged 21)	(United States) Los Angeles Kings
11	F	Mikael Backlund – C	1.85 m (6 ft 1 in)	90 kg (200 lb)	March 17, 1989 (aged 29)	(Canada) Calgary Flames
12	F	Johan Larsson	1.82 m (6 ft 0 in)	91 kg (201 lb)	July 25, 1992 (aged 25)	(United States) Buffalo Sabres
13	F	Mattias Janmark-Nylén	1.85 m (6 ft 1 in)	86 kg (190 lb)	December 8, 1992 (aged 25)	(United States) Dallas Stars
14	F	Gustav Nyquist	1.82 m (6 ft 0 in)	83 kg (183 lb)	September 1, 1989 (aged 28)	(United States) Detroit Red Wings
18	F	Dennis Everberg	1.93 m (6 ft 4 in)	95 kg (209 lb)	December 31, 1991 (aged 26)	(Russia) Neftekhimik Nizhnekamsk
23	D	Oliver Ekman-Larsson – A	1.88 m (6 ft 2 in)	91 kg (201 lb)	July 17, 1991 (aged 26)	(United States) Arizona Coyotes
24	F	Lias Andersson	1.81 m (5 ft 11 in)	90 kg (200 lb)	October 13, 1998 (aged 19)	(United States) Hartford Wolf Pack
25	F	Jacob de la Rose	1.90 m (6 ft 3 in)	95 kg (209 lb)	May 20, 1995 (aged 22)	(Canada) Montreal Canadiens
30	G	Filip Gustavsson	1.87 m (6 ft 2 in)	84 kg (185 lb)	June 7, 1998 (aged 19)	(Sweden) Luleå HF
31	G	Anders Nilsson	1.96 m (6 ft 5 in)	104 kg (229 lb)	March 19, 1990 (aged 28)	(Canada) Vancouver Canucks
33	F	Viktor Arvidsson	1.76 m (5 ft 9 in)	82 kg (181 lb)	April 8, 1993 (aged 25)	(United States) Nashville Predators
35	G	Magnus Hellberg	1.95 m (6 ft 5 in)	83 kg (183 lb)	April 4, 1991 (aged 27)	(China) Kunlun Red Star
40	F	Elias Pettersson	1.86 m (6 ft 1 in)	75 kg (165 lb)	November 12, 1998 (aged 19)	(Sweden) Växjö Lakers
47	D	Hampus Lindholm	1.91 m (6 ft 3 in)	93 kg (205 lb)	January 20, 1994 (aged 24)	(United States) Anaheim Ducks
56	D	Erik Gustafsson	1.86 m (6 ft 1 in)	90 kg (200 lb)	March 14, 1992 (aged 26)	(United States) Chicago Blackhawks
67	F	Rickard Rakell	1.88 m (6 ft 2 in)	91 kg (201 lb)	May 5, 1993 (aged 24)	(United States) Anaheim Ducks
72	F	Patric Hörnqvist	1.82 m (6 ft 0 in)	86 kg (190 lb)	January 1, 1987 (aged 31)	(United States) Pittsburgh Penguins
79	F	Filip Forsberg	1.85 m (6 ft 1 in)	93 kg (205 lb)	August 13, 1994 (aged 23)	(United States) Nashville Predators
91	F	Magnus Pääjärvi	1.91 m (6 ft 3 in)	95 kg (209 lb)	April 12, 1991 (aged 27)	(Canada) Ottawa Senators
93	F	Mika Zibanejad	1.88 m (6 ft 2 in)	101 kg (223 lb)	April 18, 1993 (aged 25)	(United States) New York Rangers

=== Switzerland ===
A 26-player roster was announced on 28 April 2018.

Head coach: Patrick Fischer

No.	Pos.	Name	Height	Weight	Birthdate	Team
14	F	Chris Baltisberger	1.83 m (6 ft 0 in)	89 kg (196 lb)	October 31, 1991 (aged 26)	(Switzerland) ZSC Lions
15	F	Grégory Hofmann	1.82 m (6 ft 0 in)	80 kg (180 lb)	November 13, 1992 (aged 25)	(Switzerland) HC Lugano
16	D	Raphael Diaz – C	1.81 m (5 ft 11 in)	88 kg (194 lb)	January 9, 1986 (aged 32)	(Switzerland) EV Zug
19	F	Reto Schäppi	1.93 m (6 ft 4 in)	94 kg (207 lb)	January 27, 1991 (aged 27)	(Switzerland) ZSC Lions
20	G	Reto Berra	1.94 m (6 ft 4 in)	89 kg (196 lb)	January 3, 1987 (aged 31)	(United States) San Diego Gulls
21	F	Kevin Fiala	1.80 m (5 ft 11 in)	85 kg (187 lb)	July 22, 1996 (aged 21)	(United States) Nashville Predators
22	F	Nino Niederreiter – A	1.85 m (6 ft 1 in)	92 kg (203 lb)	September 8, 1992 (aged 25)	(United States) Minnesota Wild
28	F	Timo Meier	1.86 m (6 ft 1 in)	98 kg (216 lb)	October 6, 1996 (aged 21)	(United States) San Jose Sharks
34	D	Dean Kukan	1.87 m (6 ft 2 in)	90 kg (200 lb)	July 8, 1993 (aged 24)	(United States) Cleveland Monsters
38	D	Lukas Frick	1.88 m (6 ft 2 in)	88 kg (194 lb)	September 15, 1994 (aged 23)	(Switzerland) Lausanne HC
41	D	Mirco Müller	1.91 m (6 ft 3 in)	93 kg (205 lb)	March 21, 1995 (aged 23)	(United States) New Jersey Devils
45	D	Michael Fora	1.89 m (6 ft 2 in)	94 kg (207 lb)	October 30, 1995 (aged 22)	(Switzerland) HC Ambrì-Piotta
46	F	Noah Rod	1.84 m (6 ft 0 in)	88 kg (194 lb)	June 7, 1996 (aged 21)	(United States) San Jose Barracuda
60	F	Tristan Scherwey	1.76 m (5 ft 9 in)	80 kg (180 lb)	May 7, 1991 (aged 26)	(Switzerland) SC Bern
62	G	Gilles Senn	1.95 m (6 ft 5 in)	87 kg (192 lb)	March 1, 1996 (aged 22)	(Switzerland) HC Davos
63	G	Leonardo Genoni	1.80 m (5 ft 11 in)	80 kg (180 lb)	August 28, 1987 (aged 30)	(Switzerland) SC Bern
65	D	Ramon Untersander	1.83 m (6 ft 0 in)	88 kg (194 lb)	January 21, 1991 (aged 27)	(Switzerland) SC Bern
71	F	Enzo Corvi	1.83 m (6 ft 0 in)	81 kg (179 lb)	December 23, 1992 (aged 25)	(Switzerland) HC Davos
76	D	Joël Genazzi	1.85 m (6 ft 1 in)	90 kg (200 lb)	February 10, 1988 (aged 30)	(Switzerland) Lausanne HC
79	F	Damien Riat	1.83 m (6 ft 0 in)	78 kg (172 lb)	February 26, 1997 (aged 21)	(Switzerland) Genève-Servette HC
82	F	Simon Moser – A	1.87 m (6 ft 2 in)	95 kg (209 lb)	March 10, 1989 (aged 29)	(Switzerland) SC Bern
83	F	Joël Vermin	1.80 m (5 ft 11 in)	87 kg (192 lb)	February 5, 1992 (aged 26)	(Switzerland) Lausanne HC
85	F	Sven Andrighetto	1.75 m (5 ft 9 in)	83 kg (183 lb)	March 21, 1993 (aged 25)	(United States) Colorado Avalanche
90	D	Roman Josi	1.86 m (6 ft 1 in)	88 kg (194 lb)	June 1, 1990 (aged 27)	(United States) Nashville Predators
92	F	Gaëtan Haas	1.81 m (5 ft 11 in)	80 kg (180 lb)	January 31, 1992 (aged 26)	(Switzerland) SC Bern

== Group B ==
=== Canada ===
An 18-player roster was announced on 12 April 2018, while four more players were added on 27 April 2018. Tyson Jost joined the team on 30 April 2018. Marc-Édouard Vlasic was added to the team 9 May 2018. Kyle Turris was added on 15 May 2018.

Head coach: Bill Peters

No.	Pos.	Name	Height	Weight	Birthdate	Team
1	G	Michael DiPietro	1.83 m (6 ft 0 in)	91 kg (201 lb)	September 6, 1999 (aged 18)	(Canada) Windsor Spitfires
3	D	Joel Edmundson	1.93 m (6 ft 4 in)	98 kg (216 lb)	June 28, 1993 (aged 24)	(United States) St. Louis Blues
5	D	Aaron Ekblad	1.93 m (6 ft 4 in)	98 kg (216 lb)	February 7, 1996 (aged 22)	(United States) Florida Panthers
6	D	Ryan Pulock	1.89 m (6 ft 2 in)	98 kg (216 lb)	October 6, 1994 (aged 23)	(United States) New York Islanders
7	F	Jordan Eberle	1.82 m (6 ft 0 in)	85 kg (187 lb)	May 15, 1990 (aged 27)	(United States) New York Islanders
8	F	Kyle Turris	1.85 m (6 ft 1 in)	86 kg (190 lb)	August 14, 1989 (aged 28)	(United States) Nashville Predators
10	F	Brayden Schenn – A	1.85 m (6 ft 1 in)	86 kg (190 lb)	August 22, 1991 (aged 26)	(United States) St. Louis Blues
11	F	Jean-Gabriel Pageau	1.78 m (5 ft 10 in)	84 kg (185 lb)	November 11, 1992 (aged 25)	(Canada) Ottawa Senators
12	F	Josh Bailey	1.86 m (6 ft 1 in)	92 kg (203 lb)	October 2, 1989 (aged 28)	(United States) New York Islanders
13	F	Mathew Barzal	1.83 m (6 ft 0 in)	86 kg (190 lb)	May 26, 1997 (aged 20)	(United States) New York Islanders
17	F	Jaden Schwartz	1.78 m (5 ft 10 in)	87 kg (192 lb)	June 25, 1992 (aged 25)	(United States) St. Louis Blues
18	F	Pierre-Luc Dubois	1.83 m (6 ft 0 in)	94 kg (207 lb)	June 24, 1998 (aged 19)	(United States) Columbus Blue Jackets
21	F	Tyson Jost	1.80 m (5 ft 11 in)	86 kg (190 lb)	March 17, 1998 (aged 20)	(United States) Colorado Avalanche
25	D	Darnell Nurse	1.93 m (6 ft 4 in)	101 kg (223 lb)	February 4, 1995 (aged 23)	(Canada) Edmonton Oilers
27	D	Ryan Murray	1.83 m (6 ft 0 in)	93 kg (205 lb)	September 27, 1993 (aged 24)	(United States) Columbus Blue Jackets
30	G	Curtis McElhinney	1.87 m (6 ft 2 in)	91 kg (201 lb)	May 23, 1983 (aged 34)	(Canada) Toronto Maple Leafs
35	G	Darcy Kuemper	1.95 m (6 ft 5 in)	97 kg (214 lb)	May 5, 1990 (aged 27)	(United States) Arizona Coyotes
44	D	Marc-Édouard Vlasic	1.85 m (6 ft 1 in)	93 kg (205 lb)	March 30, 1987 (aged 31)	(United States) San Jose Sharks
52	D	Thomas Chabot	1.88 m (6 ft 2 in)	86 kg (190 lb)	January 30, 1997 (aged 21)	(Canada) Ottawa Senators
53	F	Bo Horvat	1.83 m (6 ft 0 in)	101 kg (223 lb)	May 4, 1995 (aged 23)	(Canada) Vancouver Canucks
55	D	Colton Parayko	1.96 m (6 ft 5 in)	97 kg (214 lb)	May 12, 1993 (aged 24)	(United States) St. Louis Blues
72	F	Anthony Beauvillier	1.78 m (5 ft 10 in)	81 kg (179 lb)	June 8, 1997 (aged 20)	(United States) New York Islanders
90	F	Ryan O'Reilly – A	1.83 m (6 ft 0 in)	96 kg (212 lb)	February 7, 1991 (aged 27)	(United States) Buffalo Sabres
93	F	Ryan Nugent-Hopkins	1.83 m (6 ft 0 in)	84 kg (185 lb)	April 12, 1993 (aged 25)	(Canada) Edmonton Oilers
97	F	Connor McDavid – C	1.85 m (6 ft 1 in)	85 kg (187 lb)	January 13, 1997 (aged 21)	(Canada) Edmonton Oilers

=== Denmark ===
A 26-player roster was announced on 30 April 2018. On 2 May, it was announced that Oliver Bjorkstrand would join the team.

Head coach: Janne Karlsson

No.	Pos.	Name	Height	Weight	Birthdate	Team
3	D	Philip Larsen	1.83 m (6 ft 0 in)	86 kg (190 lb)	December 7, 1989 (aged 28)	(Russia) Salavat Yulaev Ufa
5	D	Daniel Nielsen	1.82 m (6 ft 0 in)	83 kg (183 lb)	October 31, 1980 (aged 37)	(Denmark) Herning Blue Fox
6	D	Stefan Lassen	1.90 m (6 ft 3 in)	90 kg (200 lb)	November 1, 1985 (aged 32)	(Finland) Lahti Pelicans
9	F	Frederik Storm	1.80 m (5 ft 11 in)	86 kg (190 lb)	February 20, 1989 (aged 29)	(Sweden) Malmö Redhawks
12	F	Mads Christensen	1.79 m (5 ft 10 in)	80 kg (180 lb)	April 2, 1987 (aged 31)	(Germany) EHC Red Bull München
17	F	Nicklas Jensen	1.91 m (6 ft 3 in)	85 kg (187 lb)	March 6, 1993 (aged 25)	(Finland) Jokerit
25	D	Oliver Lauridsen	1.97 m (6 ft 6 in)	104 kg (229 lb)	March 24, 1989 (aged 29)	(Finland) Jokerit
27	F	Oliver Bjorkstrand	1.83 m (6 ft 0 in)	79 kg (174 lb)	April 10, 1995 (aged 23)	(United States) Columbus Blue Jackets
28	D	Emil Kristensen	1.84 m (6 ft 0 in)	84 kg (185 lb)	September 20, 1992 (aged 25)	(Finland) KooKoo
29	F	Morten Madsen – A	1.90 m (6 ft 3 in)	95 kg (209 lb)	January 16, 1987 (aged 31)	(Sweden) Karlskrona HK
31	G	Frederik Andersen	1.93 m (6 ft 4 in)	100 kg (220 lb)	October 2, 1989 (aged 28)	(Canada) Toronto Maple Leafs
32	G	Sebastian Dahm	1.82 m (6 ft 0 in)	80 kg (180 lb)	February 28, 1987 (aged 31)	(Germany) Iserlohn Roosters
33	F	Julian Jakobsen	1.84 m (6 ft 0 in)	87 kg (192 lb)	April 11, 1987 (aged 31)	(Denmark) Aalborg Pirates
36	F	Jannik Hansen	1.85 m (6 ft 1 in)	92 kg (203 lb)	March 15, 1986 (aged 32)	(United States) San Jose Sharks
39	G	Georg Sørensen	1.76 m (5 ft 9 in)	75 kg (165 lb)	May 15, 1995 (aged 22)	(Sweden) Södertälje SK
40	F	Jesper Jensen	1.83 m (6 ft 0 in)	80 kg (180 lb)	February 5, 1987 (aged 31)	(Sweden) Brynäs IF
41	D	Jesper Jensen Aabo	1.83 m (6 ft 0 in)	86 kg (190 lb)	July 30, 1991 (aged 26)	(Finland) Jokerit
43	F	Nichlas Hardt	1.77 m (5 ft 10 in)	80 kg (180 lb)	July 6, 1988 (aged 29)	(Sweden) Malmö Redhawks
48	D	Nicholas Jensen	1.89 m (6 ft 2 in)	90 kg (200 lb)	April 8, 1989 (aged 29)	(Germany) Fischtown Pinguins
50	F	Mathias Bau Hansen	2.00 m (6 ft 7 in)	108 kg (238 lb)	July 3, 1993 (aged 24)	(United States) Hershey Bears
51	F	Frans Nielsen – A	1.83 m (6 ft 0 in)	84 kg (185 lb)	April 24, 1984 (aged 34)	(United States) Detroit Red Wings
63	F	Patrick Russell	1.86 m (6 ft 1 in)	93 kg (205 lb)	January 4, 1993 (aged 25)	(United States) Bakersfield Condors
89	F	Mikkel Bødker	1.80 m (5 ft 11 in)	88 kg (194 lb)	December 16, 1989 (aged 28)	(United States) San Jose Sharks
93	F	Peter Regin – C	1.87 m (6 ft 2 in)	90 kg (200 lb)	April 16, 1986 (aged 32)	(Finland) Jokerit

=== Finland ===
A 25-player roster was announced on 30 April 2018.

Head coach: Lauri Marjamäki

No.	Pos.	Name	Height	Weight	Birthdate	Team
2	D	Ville Pokka	1.83 m (6 ft 0 in)	89 kg (196 lb)	June 3, 1994 (aged 23)	(Canada) Belleville Senators
4	D	Tommi Kivistö	1.86 m (6 ft 1 in)	95 kg (209 lb)	June 7, 1991 (aged 26)	(Finland) Jokerit
6	D	Julius Honka	1.79 m (5 ft 10 in)	84 kg (185 lb)	December 3, 1995 (aged 22)	(United States) Dallas Stars
7	D	Niko Mikkola	1.94 m (6 ft 4 in)	84 kg (185 lb)	April 27, 1996 (aged 22)	(Finland) Tappara
12	F	Marko Anttila	2.03 m (6 ft 8 in)	104 kg (229 lb)	May 27, 1985 (aged 32)	(Finland) Jokerit
18	F	Saku Mäenalanen	1.90 m (6 ft 3 in)	87 kg (192 lb)	May 29, 1994 (aged 23)	(Finland) Oulun Kärpät
19	F	Veli-Matti Savinainen	1.82 m (6 ft 0 in)	82 kg (181 lb)	January 5, 1986 (aged 32)	(Russia) HC Yugra
20	F	Sebastian Aho – A	1.81 m (5 ft 11 in)	78 kg (172 lb)	July 26, 1997 (aged 20)	(United States) Carolina Hurricanes
22	F	Janne Pesonen	1.80 m (5 ft 11 in)	83 kg (183 lb)	May 11, 1982 (aged 35)	(Sweden) Växjö Lakers
24	F	Kasperi Kapanen	1.83 m (6 ft 0 in)	82 kg (181 lb)	July 23, 1996 (aged 21)	(Canada) Toronto Maple Leafs
25	F	Pekka Jormakka	1.74 m (5 ft 9 in)	80 kg (180 lb)	September 14, 1990 (aged 27)	(Finland) Jokerit
29	G	Harri Säteri	1.84 m (6 ft 0 in)	92 kg (203 lb)	December 29, 1989 (aged 28)	(United States) Florida Panthers
34	F	Olli Palola	1.79 m (5 ft 10 in)	81 kg (179 lb)	April 8, 1988 (aged 30)	(Finland) Jokerit
35	G	Ville Husso	1.91 m (6 ft 3 in)	94 kg (207 lb)	February 26, 1995 (aged 23)	(United States) San Antonio Rampage
37	G	Eero Kilpeläinen	1.82 m (6 ft 0 in)	79 kg (174 lb)	May 7, 1985 (aged 32)	(Sweden) Örebro HK
41	D	Miro Heiskanen	1.82 m (6 ft 0 in)	77 kg (170 lb)	July 18, 1999 (aged 18)	(Finland) HIFK
50	D	Juuso Riikola	1.81 m (5 ft 11 in)	86 kg (190 lb)	November 9, 1993 (aged 24)	(Finland) KalPa
55	D	Miika Koivisto	1.84 m (6 ft 0 in)	88 kg (194 lb)	July 20, 1990 (aged 27)	(Finland) Oulun Kärpät
64	F	Mikael Granlund – C	1.79 m (5 ft 10 in)	83 kg (183 lb)	February 26, 1992 (aged 26)	(United States) Minnesota Wild
65	F	Sakari Manninen	1.70 m (5 ft 7 in)	71 kg (157 lb)	February 10, 1992 (aged 26)	(Sweden) Örebro HK
74	F	Antti Suomela	1.83 m (6 ft 0 in)	78 kg (172 lb)	March 17, 1994 (aged 24)	(Finland) JYP Jyväskylä
77	D	Markus Nutivaara	1.85 m (6 ft 1 in)	87 kg (192 lb)	June 6, 1994 (aged 23)	(United States) Columbus Blue Jackets
81	F	Eeli Tolvanen	1.79 m (5 ft 10 in)	82 kg (181 lb)	April 22, 1999 (aged 19)	(United States) Nashville Predators
86	F	Teuvo Teräväinen	1.80 m (5 ft 11 in)	81 kg (179 lb)	September 11, 1994 (aged 23)	(United States) Carolina Hurricanes
96	F	Mikko Rantanen – A	1.93 m (6 ft 4 in)	96 kg (212 lb)	October 29, 1996 (aged 21)	(United States) Colorado Avalanche

=== Germany ===
A 25-player roster was announced on 30 April 2018. On 1 May 2018, Mirko Höfflin replaced Marcel Müller due to an injury.

Head coach: Marco Sturm

Number	Position	Name	Height	Weight	Birthdate	Team
5	D	Korbinian Holzer – A	1.90 m (6 ft 3 in)	94 kg (207 lb)	February 16, 1988 (aged 30)	(United States) Anaheim Ducks
21	F	Nico Krämmer	1.86 m (6 ft 1 in)	94 kg (207 lb)	October 23, 1992 (aged 25)	(Germany) Kölner Haie
22	F	Matthias Plachta – A	1.88 m (6 ft 2 in)	100 kg (220 lb)	May 16, 1991 (aged 26)	(Germany) Adler Mannheim
24	D	Dennis Seidenberg – C	1.86 m (6 ft 1 in)	95 kg (209 lb)	July 18, 1981 (aged 36)	(United States) New York Islanders
27	F	Sebastian Uvira	1.88 m (6 ft 2 in)	95 kg (209 lb)	January 26, 1993 (aged 25)	(Germany) Kölner Haie
29	F	Leon Draisaitl – A	1.89 m (6 ft 2 in)	96 kg (212 lb)	October 21, 1995 (aged 22)	(Canada) Edmonton Oilers
31	G	Niklas Treutle	1.87 m (6 ft 2 in)	85 kg (187 lb)	April 29, 1991 (aged 27)	(Germany) Thomas Sabo Ice Tigers
32	D	Oliver Mebus	2.06 m (6 ft 9 in)	109 kg (240 lb)	March 30, 1993 (aged 25)	(Germany) Thomas Sabo Ice Tigers
35	G	Mathias Niederberger	1.80 m (5 ft 11 in)	80 kg (180 lb)	November 26, 1992 (aged 25)	(Germany) Düsseldorfer EG
36	D	Yannic Seidenberg – A	1.72 m (5 ft 8 in)	82 kg (181 lb)	January 11, 1984 (aged 34)	(Germany) EHC Red Bull München
40	D	Björn Krupp	1.91 m (6 ft 3 in)	95 kg (209 lb)	March 6, 1991 (aged 27)	(Germany) Grizzlys Wolfsburg
41	D	Jonas Müller	1.83 m (6 ft 0 in)	88 kg (194 lb)	November 19, 1995 (aged 22)	(Germany) Eisbären Berlin
42	F	Yasin Ehliz	1.77 m (5 ft 10 in)	84 kg (185 lb)	December 30, 1992 (aged 25)	(Germany) Thomas Sabo Ice Tigers
50	F	Patrick Hager – A	1.78 m (5 ft 10 in)	82 kg (181 lb)	September 8, 1988 (aged 29)	(Germany) EHC Red Bull München
51	G	Timo Pielmeier	1.83 m (6 ft 0 in)	82 kg (181 lb)	July 7, 1989 (aged 28)	(Germany) ERC Ingolstadt
58	F	Markus Eisenschmid	1.84 m (6 ft 0 in)	82 kg (181 lb)	January 22, 1995 (aged 23)	(Canada) Laval Rocket
59	F	Manuel Wiederer	1.83 m (6 ft 0 in)	82 kg (181 lb)	November 21, 1996 (aged 21)	(United States) San Jose Barracuda
61	F	Mirko Höfflin	1.83 m (6 ft 0 in)	80 kg (180 lb)	June 18, 1992 (aged 25)	(Germany) Schwenninger Wild Wings
65	F	Marc Michaelis	1.77 m (5 ft 10 in)	79 kg (174 lb)	July 31, 1995 (aged 22)	(United States) Minnesota State Univ.
67	D	Bernhard Ebner	1.88 m (6 ft 2 in)	91 kg (201 lb)	September 12, 1990 (aged 27)	(Germany) Düsseldorfer EG
72	F	Dominik Kahun	1.80 m (5 ft 11 in)	80 kg (180 lb)	July 2, 1995 (aged 22)	(Germany) EHC Red Bull München
86	F	Daniel Pietta	1.84 m (6 ft 0 in)	94 kg (207 lb)	December 9, 1986 (aged 31)	(Germany) Krefeld Pinguine
91	D	Moritz Müller – A	1.87 m (6 ft 2 in)	92 kg (203 lb)	November 19, 1986 (aged 31)	(Germany) Kölner Haie
92	F	Marcel Noebels	1.92 m (6 ft 4 in)	92 kg (203 lb)	March 14, 1992 (aged 26)	(Germany) Eisbären Berlin
95	F	Frederik Tiffels	1.85 m (6 ft 1 in)	91 kg (201 lb)	May 20, 1995 (aged 22)	(United States) Wheeling Nailers

=== Latvia ===
A 25-player roster was announced on 18 April 2018.

Head coach: Bob Hartley

No.	Pos.	Name	Height	Weight	Birthdate	Team
3	D	Edgars Siksna	1.87 m (6 ft 2 in)	96 kg (212 lb)	January 15, 1993 (aged 25)	(Kazakhstan) Saryarka Karagandy
10	F	Rihards Bukarts	1.79 m (5 ft 10 in)	84 kg (185 lb)	December 31, 1995 (aged 22)	(Germany) Eisbären Berlin
11	D	Kristaps Sotnieks – A	1.83 m (6 ft 0 in)	94 kg (207 lb)	January 29, 1987 (aged 31)	(Russia) HC Lada Togliatti
15	F	Mārtiņš Karsums	1.77 m (5 ft 10 in)	97 kg (214 lb)	February 26, 1986 (aged 32)	(Russia) HC Dynamo Moscow
18	F	Rodrigo Ābols	1.93 m (6 ft 4 in)	92 kg (203 lb)	January 5, 1996 (aged 22)	(Sweden) Örebro HK
21	F	Rūdolfs Balcers	1.80 m (5 ft 11 in)	75 kg (165 lb)	April 8, 1997 (aged 21)	(United States) San Jose Barracuda
23	F	Teodors Bļugers	1.86 m (6 ft 1 in)	84 kg (185 lb)	August 15, 1994 (aged 23)	(United States) Wilkes-Barre/Scranton Penguins
24	F	Miķelis Rēdlihs	1.81 m (5 ft 11 in)	83 kg (183 lb)	July 1, 1984 (aged 33)	(Latvia) Dinamo Riga
25	D	Andris Džeriņš	1.86 m (6 ft 1 in)	87 kg (192 lb)	February 14, 1988 (aged 30)	(Czech Republic) Mountfield HK
26	D	Uvis Balinskis	1.82 m (6 ft 0 in)	84 kg (185 lb)	August 1, 1996 (aged 21)	(Latvia) Dinamo Riga
27	D	Oskars Cibuļskis	1.88 m (6 ft 2 in)	96 kg (212 lb)	April 9, 1988 (aged 30)	(Czech Republic) Mountfield HK
29	D	Ralfs Freibergs	1.81 m (5 ft 11 in)	84 kg (185 lb)	May 17, 1991 (aged 26)	(Czech Republic) HC Zlín
30	G	Elvis Merzļikins	1.91 m (6 ft 3 in)	85 kg (187 lb)	April 13, 1994 (aged 24)	(Switzerland) HC Lugano
35	G	Matiss Kivlenieks	1.87 m (6 ft 2 in)	86 kg (190 lb)	August 26, 1996 (aged 21)	(United States) Cleveland Monsters
41	F	Frenks Razgals	1.89 m (6 ft 2 in)	88 kg (194 lb)	August 8, 1996 (aged 21)	(Latvia) Dinamo Riga
50	G	Kristers Gudļevskis	1.90 m (6 ft 3 in)	86 kg (190 lb)	July 31, 1992 (aged 25)	(United States) Bridgeport Sound Tigers
58	D	Guntis Galviņš	1.87 m (6 ft 2 in)	98 kg (216 lb)	January 25, 1986 (aged 32)	(Latvia) Dinamo Riga
70	F	Miks Indrašis – A	1.92 m (6 ft 4 in)	88 kg (194 lb)	September 30, 1990 (aged 27)	(Latvia) Dinamo Riga
71	F	Roberts Bukarts – C	1.82 m (6 ft 0 in)	82 kg (181 lb)	June 27, 1990 (aged 27)	(Czech Republic) PSG Zlín
77	D	Kristaps Zīle	1.85 m (6 ft 1 in)	85 kg (187 lb)	December 24, 1997 (aged 20)	(Latvia) Dinamo Riga
79	F	Vitalijs Pavlovs	1.92 m (6 ft 4 in)	101 kg (223 lb)	June 17, 1989 (aged 28)	(Latvia) Dinamo Riga
87	F	Gints Meija	1.85 m (6 ft 1 in)	91 kg (201 lb)	September 4, 1987 (aged 30)	(Latvia) Dinamo Riga
89	F	Ņikita Jevpalovs	1.86 m (6 ft 1 in)	93 kg (205 lb)	September 9, 1994 (aged 23)	(Latvia) Dinamo Riga
91	F	Ronalds Ķēniņš	1.82 m (6 ft 0 in)	91 kg (201 lb)	February 28, 1991 (aged 27)	(Switzerland) ZSC Lions
94	D	Kristiāns Rubīns	1.94 m (6 ft 4 in)	96 kg (212 lb)	December 11, 1997 (aged 20)	(Canada) Medicine Hat Tigers

=== Norway ===
A 27-player roster was announced on 27 April 2018. It was down to 24 players on 30 April 2018.

Head coach: Petter Thoresen

No.	Pos.	Name	Height	Weight	Birthdate	Team
4	D	Johannes Johannesen	1.81 m (5 ft 11 in)	85 kg (187 lb)	March 1, 1997 (aged 21)	(Norway) Stavanger Oilers
6	D	Jonas Holøs – C	1.80 m (5 ft 11 in)	93 kg (205 lb)	August 27, 1987 (aged 30)	(Switzerland) HC Fribourg-Gottéron
8	F	Mathias Trettenes	1.79 m (5 ft 10 in)	76 kg (168 lb)	November 8, 1993 (aged 24)	(Germany) Krefeld Pinguine
12	F	Michael Haga	1.80 m (5 ft 11 in)	77 kg (170 lb)	March 10, 1992 (aged 26)	(Sweden) Mora IK
14	D	Dennis Sveum	1.85 m (6 ft 1 in)	86 kg (190 lb)	November 27, 1986 (aged 31)	(Norway) Stavanger Oilers
15	F	Tommy Kristiansen	1.89 m (6 ft 2 in)	98 kg (216 lb)	May 26, 1989 (aged 28)	(Norway) Sparta Sarpsborg
16	F	Eirik Salsten	1.84 m (6 ft 0 in)	90 kg (200 lb)	June 17, 1994 (aged 23)	(Norway) Stavanger Oilers
17	D	Stefan Espeland	1.84 m (6 ft 0 in)	84 kg (185 lb)	March 24, 1989 (aged 29)	(Norway) Vålerenga Ishockey
18	F	Tobias Lindström	1.77 m (5 ft 10 in)	92 kg (203 lb)	April 20, 1988 (aged 30)	(Norway) Vålerenga Ishockey
20	F	Anders Bastiansen – A	1.90 m (6 ft 3 in)	93 kg (205 lb)	October 31, 1980 (aged 37)	(Norway) Frisk Asker Ishockey
21	F	Steffen Thoresen	1.80 m (5 ft 11 in)	88 kg (194 lb)	June 3, 1985 (aged 32)	(Norway) Storhamar Ishockey
22	F	Martin Røymark	1.84 m (6 ft 0 in)	86 kg (190 lb)	November 10, 1986 (aged 31)	(Sweden) Modo Hockey
26	F	Kristian Forsberg	1.85 m (6 ft 1 in)	88 kg (194 lb)	May 5, 1986 (aged 31)	(Norway) Stavanger Oilers
27	F	Ludvig Hoff	1.83 m (6 ft 0 in)	86 kg (190 lb)	October 16, 1996 (aged 21)	(United States) Univ. of North Dakota
28	F	Niklas Roest	1.74 m (5 ft 9 in)	80 kg (180 lb)	August 3, 1986 (aged 31)	(Norway) Sparta Warriors
30	G	Lars Haugen	1.85 m (6 ft 1 in)	83 kg (183 lb)	March 19, 1987 (aged 31)	(Sweden) Färjestad BK
33	G	Henrik Haukeland	1.86 m (6 ft 1 in)	83 kg (183 lb)	December 6, 1994 (aged 23)	(Sweden) Timrå IK
37	D	Villiam Strøm	1.91 m (6 ft 3 in)	95 kg (209 lb)	December 10, 1990 (aged 27)	(Norway) Stavanger Oilers
38	G	Henrik Holm	1.85 m (6 ft 1 in)	80 kg (180 lb)	September 6, 1990 (aged 27)	(Norway) Stavanger Oilers
40	F	Ken André Olimb	1.79 m (5 ft 10 in)	81 kg (179 lb)	January 21, 1989 (aged 29)	(Sweden) Linköpings HC
43	D	Christian Bull	1.86 m (6 ft 1 in)	90 kg (200 lb)	August 13, 1996 (aged 21)	(Norway) Storhamar Ishockey
46	F	Mathis Olimb – A	1.77 m (5 ft 10 in)	79 kg (174 lb)	February 1, 1986 (aged 32)	(Sweden) Linköpings HC
47	D	Alexander Bonsaksen	1.80 m (5 ft 11 in)	84 kg (185 lb)	January 24, 1987 (aged 31)	(Germany) Iserlohn Roosters
90	D	Daniel Sørvik	1.83 m (6 ft 0 in)	83 kg (183 lb)	March 11, 1990 (aged 28)	(Czech Republic) HC Litvínov
93	F	Thomas Valkvæ Olsen	1.86 m (6 ft 1 in)	88 kg (194 lb)	May 18, 1993 (aged 24)	(Sweden) Södertälje SK

=== South Korea ===
Head coach: Jim Paek

No.	Pos.	Name	Height	Weight	Birthdate	Team
1	G	Matt Dalton	1.89 m (6 ft 2 in)	91 kg (201 lb)	July 4, 1986 (aged 31)	(South Korea) Anyang Halla
3	D	Seo Yeong-jun	1.83 m (6 ft 0 in)	82 kg (181 lb)	March 8, 1995 (aged 23)	(South Korea) Daemyung Killer Whales
5	D	Bryan Young	1.88 m (6 ft 2 in)	88 kg (194 lb)	August 6, 1986 (aged 31)	(South Korea) Daemyung Killer Whales
6	D	Kim Won-jun	1.80 m (5 ft 11 in)	83 kg (183 lb)	May 4, 1991 (aged 27)	(South Korea) Anyang Halla
7	D	Oh Hyon-ho	1.78 m (5 ft 10 in)	80 kg (180 lb)	October 29, 1986 (aged 31)	(South Korea) Daemyung Killer Whales
8	F	Kim Won-jung	1.82 m (6 ft 0 in)	82 kg (181 lb)	December 18, 1984 (aged 33)	(South Korea) Anyang Halla
9	F	Jeon Jung-woo	1.75 m (5 ft 9 in)	75 kg (165 lb)	May 27, 1994 (aged 23)	(South Korea) Daemyung Sangmu
10	F	Michael Swift	1.78 m (5 ft 10 in)	82 kg (181 lb)	March 26, 1987 (aged 31)	(South Korea) High1
11	F	Kim Ki-sung	1.80 m (5 ft 11 in)	85 kg (187 lb)	May 14, 1985 (aged 32)	(South Korea) Anyang Halla
12	D	Song Hyeong-cheol	1.82 m (6 ft 0 in)	80 kg (180 lb)	January 28, 1996 (aged 22)	(South Korea) Anyang Halla
13	F	Lee Young-jun	1.84 m (6 ft 0 in)	75 kg (165 lb)	January 3, 1991 (aged 27)	(South Korea) Daemyung Killer Whales
19	F	Kim Sang-wook	1.82 m (6 ft 0 in)	87 kg (192 lb)	April 21, 1988 (aged 30)	(South Korea) Anyang Halla
23	D	Eric Regan	1.90 m (6 ft 3 in)	97 kg (214 lb)	May 20, 1988 (aged 29)	(South Korea) Anyang Halla
25	F	Brock Radunske	1.96 m (6 ft 5 in)	95 kg (209 lb)	April 5, 1983 (aged 35)	(South Korea) Anyang Halla
27	F	Ahn Jin-hui	1.82 m (6 ft 0 in)	84 kg (185 lb)	March 6, 1991 (aged 27)	(South Korea) Daemyung Sangmu
31	G	Lee Yeon-seung	1.82 m (6 ft 0 in)	77 kg (170 lb)	April 17, 1995 (aged 23)	(South Korea) Daemyung Killer Whales
36	F	Park Woo-sang – C	1.94 m (6 ft 4 in)	90 kg (200 lb)	May 30, 1985 (aged 32)	(South Korea) Anyang Halla
44	D	Alex Plante – A	2.00 m (6 ft 7 in)	106 kg (234 lb)	May 9, 1989 (aged 28)	(South Korea) Anyang Halla
47	F	Shin Sang-hoon	1.73 m (5 ft 8 in)	77 kg (170 lb)	August 1, 1993 (aged 24)	(South Korea) Daemyung Sangmu
50	G	Park Sung-je	1.75 m (5 ft 9 in)	84 kg (185 lb)	August 3, 1988 (aged 29)	(South Korea) High1
61	D	Lee Don-ku	1.82 m (6 ft 0 in)	95 kg (209 lb)	February 7, 1988 (aged 30)	(South Korea) Anyang Halla
63	F	Park Jin-kyu	1.76 m (5 ft 9 in)	83 kg (183 lb)	December 18, 1991 (aged 26)	(South Korea) Daemyung Sangmu
81	F	Lee Chong-hyun	1.86 m (6 ft 1 in)	90 kg (200 lb)	July 11, 1996 (aged 21)	(South Korea) Yonsei Univ.
87	F	Cho Min-ho – A	1.77 m (5 ft 10 in)	85 kg (187 lb)	January 4, 1987 (aged 31)	(South Korea) Anyang Halla
96	F	Shin Sang-woo	1.77 m (5 ft 10 in)	85 kg (187 lb)	December 12, 1987 (aged 30)	(South Korea) Anyang Halla

=== United States ===
A 23-player roster was announced on 28 April 2018.

Head coach: Jeff Blashill

No.	Pos.	Name	Height	Weight	Birthdate	Team
1	G	Keith Kinkaid	1.91 m (6 ft 3 in)	88 kg (194 lb)	July 4, 1989 (aged 28)	(United States) New Jersey Devils
3	F	Nick Bonino	1.85 m (6 ft 1 in)	89 kg (196 lb)	April 20, 1988 (aged 30)	(United States) Nashville Predators
4	D	Will Butcher	1.77 m (5 ft 10 in)	86 kg (190 lb)	January 6, 1995 (aged 23)	(United States) New Jersey Devils
5	D	Connor Murphy – A	1.93 m (6 ft 4 in)	96 kg (212 lb)	March 26, 1993 (aged 25)	(United States) Chicago Blackhawks
7	F	Derek Ryan	1.80 m (5 ft 11 in)	77 kg (170 lb)	December 29, 1986 (aged 31)	(United States) Carolina Hurricanes
12	F	Alex DeBrincat	1.71 m (5 ft 7 in)	75 kg (165 lb)	December 18, 1997 (aged 20)	(United States) Chicago Blackhawks
13	F	Johnny Gaudreau	1.70 m (5 ft 7 in)	71 kg (157 lb)	August 13, 1993 (aged 24)	(Canada) Calgary Flames
14	D	Nick Jensen	1.83 m (6 ft 0 in)	88 kg (194 lb)	September 21, 1990 (aged 27)	(United States) Detroit Red Wings
20	F	Chris Kreider	1.91 m (6 ft 3 in)	103 kg (227 lb)	April 30, 1991 (aged 27)	(United States) New York Rangers
21	F	Dylan Larkin – A	1.85 m (6 ft 1 in)	86 kg (190 lb)	July 30, 1996 (aged 21)	(United States) Detroit Red Wings
22	F	Sonny Milano	1.83 m (6 ft 0 in)	88 kg (194 lb)	May 12, 1996 (aged 21)	(United States) Columbus Blue Jackets
23	D	Alec Martinez	1.85 m (6 ft 1 in)	97 kg (214 lb)	November 28, 1991 (aged 26)	(United States) Los Angeles Kings
25	F	Blake Coleman	1.80 m (5 ft 11 in)	91 kg (201 lb)	November 28, 1991 (aged 26)	(United States) New Jersey Devils
27	F	Anders Lee	1.91 m (6 ft 3 in)	103 kg (227 lb)	July 3, 1990 (aged 27)	(United States) New York Islanders
29	F	Tage Thompson	1.96 m (6 ft 5 in)	91 kg (201 lb)	October 30, 1997 (aged 20)	(United States) St. Louis Blues
33	G	Scott Darling	1.98 m (6 ft 6 in)	105 kg (231 lb)	December 22, 1988 (aged 29)	(United States) Carolina Hurricanes
35	G	Charlie Lindgren	1.88 m (6 ft 2 in)	86 kg (190 lb)	December 18, 1993 (aged 24)	(Canada) Montreal Canadiens
36	F	Colin White	1.85 m (6 ft 1 in)	86 kg (190 lb)	January 30, 1997 (aged 21)	(Canada) Ottawa Senators
39	F	Brian Gibbons	1.73 m (5 ft 8 in)	79 kg (174 lb)	February 26, 1988 (aged 30)	(United States) New Jersey Devils
43	D	Quinn Hughes	1.76 m (5 ft 9 in)	76 kg (168 lb)	October 14, 1999 (aged 18)	(United States) Univ. of Michigan
44	D	Neal Pionk	1.80 m (5 ft 11 in)	82 kg (181 lb)	July 29, 1995 (aged 22)	(United States) New York Rangers
73	D	Charlie McAvoy	1.83 m (6 ft 0 in)	94 kg (207 lb)	December 21, 1997 (aged 20)	(United States) Boston Bruins
82	D	Jordan Oesterle	1.83 m (6 ft 0 in)	83 kg (183 lb)	June 25, 1992 (aged 25)	(United States) Chicago Blackhawks
88	F	Patrick Kane – C	1.80 m (5 ft 11 in)	80 kg (180 lb)	November 19, 1988 (aged 29)	(United States) Chicago Blackhawks
89	F	Cam Atkinson	1.73 m (5 ft 8 in)	81 kg (179 lb)	June 5, 1989 (aged 28)	(United States) Columbus Blue Jackets
