= Mike Muller =

American ice hockey player and coach

- Born: September 18, 1971 (age 54) Edina, Minnesota, USA
- Height: 6 ft 2 in (188 cm)
- Weight: 209 lb (95 kg; 14 st 13 lb)
- Position: Defence
- Shot: Left
- Played for: Russia; HC Dynamo Moscow; AHL; Moncton Hawks; Springfield Falcons; IHL; Minnesota Moose; Grand Rapids Griffins; ECHL; Mississippi Sea Wolves; Baton Rouge Kingfish; UHL; Rockford IceHogs
- NHL draft: 35th overall, 1990; Winnipeg Jets
- Playing career: 1992–2010

Mike Muller (born September 18, 1971) is an American ice hockey coach and a retired ice hockey defenseman. As of 2021, he is the head coach of the Minnesota Loons junior hockey team in the North American 3 Hockey League.

== Playing career ==
=== United States ===
He was drafted in the 2nd round of the 1990 NHL entry draft by the Winnipeg Jets out of Wayzata High School in Plymouth, Minnesota and played for the University of Minnesota between 1990 und 1992.

=== Russia ===
Muller started his professional career in the 1992–93 season playing eleven games for HC Moscow Dynamo of the Russian International Hockey League. He was the first foreign hockey player in the Russian International Hockey League, in which he was a member of the championship team in the 1992–93 season.

=== Germany ===
Until 1997, he played in the AHL, IHL and ECHL, before moving to Germany. Muller represented several second- and third-division teams from Germany, including EHC Neuwied, Iserlohner EC, Bietigheim Steelers, Moskitos Essen, EV Ravensburg and EHF Passau Black Hawks. He retired from playing after the 2009–10 season.

== Coaching career ==
In his early coaching career, Muller worked at the youth level, coaching the under-20 squad of Italian club HC Eppan in 2011–12. He then returned to Ravensburg, where he had spent three years as a player, taking over as youth coach while also serving as assistant on the club's men's team in the second German division.

Prior to the 2015–16 season, Muller was appointed head coach of ESV Kaufbeuren, a member of Germany's second-tier DEL2. In December 2015, he signed a contract extension through the 2016–17 season. On February 16, 2016, Muller was fired by ESV Kaufbeuren after a series of two wins and 13 losses since the beginning of the new year.

In March 2019, Muller was announced as the head coach of the Breezy Point North Stars of the North American 3 Hockey League (NA3HL). The team ceased operations after his first season. When the franchise was re-activated as the Minnesota Loons in 2021, he was brought back as head coach.

== Career statistics ==
| | | | Regular season | | | | | Playoffs |
| Season | Team | League | GP | G | A | Pts | PIM | GP | G | A | Pts | PIM |
|---|---|---|---|---|---|---|---|---|---|---|---|---|
| 1990–91 | University of Minnesota | NCAA | 33 | 4 | 4 | 8 | 44 | — | — | — | — | — |
| 1991–92 | University of Minnesota | NCAA | 44 | 4 | 12 | 16 | 60 | — | — | — | — | — |
| 1992–93 | HC Dynamo Moscow | Russia | 11 | 1 | 0 | 1 | 8 | — | — | — | — | — |
| 1992–93 | HC Dynamo Moscow-2 | Russia2 | 42 | 8 | 5 | 13 | 58 | — | — | — | — | — |
| 1993–94 | Moncton Hawks | AHL | 61 | 2 | 14 | 16 | 88 | — | — | — | — | — |
| 1994–95 | Springfield Falcons | AHL | 64 | 2 | 5 | 7 | 61 | — | — | — | — | — |
| 1995–96 | Minnesota Moose | IHL | 53 | 3 | 7 | 10 | 72 | — | — | — | — | — |
| 1996–97 | Grand Rapids Griffins | IHL | 2 | 0 | 0 | 0 | 4 | — | — | — | — | — |
| 1996–97 | Mississippi Sea Wolves | ECHL | 54 | 15 | 24 | 39 | 36 | — | — | — | — | — |
| 1996–97 | Baton Rouge Kingfish | ECHL | 12 | 1 | 10 | 11 | 2 | — | — | — | — | — |
| 1997–98 | EHC Neuwied | Germany2 | 68 | 22 | 39 | 61 | 42 | — | — | — | — | — |
| 1998–99 | EHC Neuwied | Germany2 | 58 | 6 | 26 | 32 | 42 | — | — | — | — | — |
| 1999–00 | Iserlohner EC | Germany2 | 11 | 2 | 4 | 6 | 12 | — | — | — | — | — |
| 1999–00 | SC Bietigheim-Bissingen | Germany2 | 29 | 1 | 6 | 7 | 57 | — | — | — | — | — |
| 2000–01 | SC Bietigheim-Bissingen | Germany2 | 38 | 4 | 10 | 14 | 50 | 4 | 0 | 3 | 3 | 10 |
| 2001–02 | Rockford IceHogs | UHL | 34 | 1 | 13 | 14 | 25 | — | — | — | — | — |
| 2001–02 | SC Mittelrhein-Neuwied | Germany3 | 21 | 5 | 6 | 11 | 20 | 5 | 0 | 1 | 1 | 8 |
| 2002–03 | SC Mittelrhein-Neuwied | Germany3 | 53 | 21 | 26 | 47 | 60 | 3 | 1 | 2 | 3 | 10 |
| 2003–04 | Moskitos Essen | Germany3 | 53 | 12 | 21 | 33 | 83 | 6 | 3 | 3 | 6 | 6 |
| 2004–05 | EV Ravensburg | Germany3 | 49 | 30 | 30 | 60 | 60 | 3 | 0 | 2 | 2 | 2 |
| 2005–06 | EV Ravensburg | Germany3 | 51 | 26 | 29 | 55 | 106 | 6 | 3 | 5 | 8 | 16 |
| 2006–07 | EV Ravensburg | Germany3 | 47 | 13 | 30 | 43 | 125 | 10 | 1 | 7 | 8 | 47 |
| 2007–08 | EHF Passau Black Hawks | Germany3 | 53 | 9 | 16 | 25 | 99 | — | — | — | — | — |
| 2008–09 | EHF Passau Black Hawks | Germany3 | 61 | 11 | 54 | 65 | 68 | — | — | — | — | — |
| 2009–10 | EHF Passau Black Hawks | Germany3 | 40 | 6 | 18 | 24 | 38 | 5 | 1 | 1 | 2 | 6 |
| AHL totals | | | 125 | 4 | 19 | 23 | 149 | — | — | — | — | — |
