= Kristaps Zīle =

Latvian ice hockey player (born 1997)

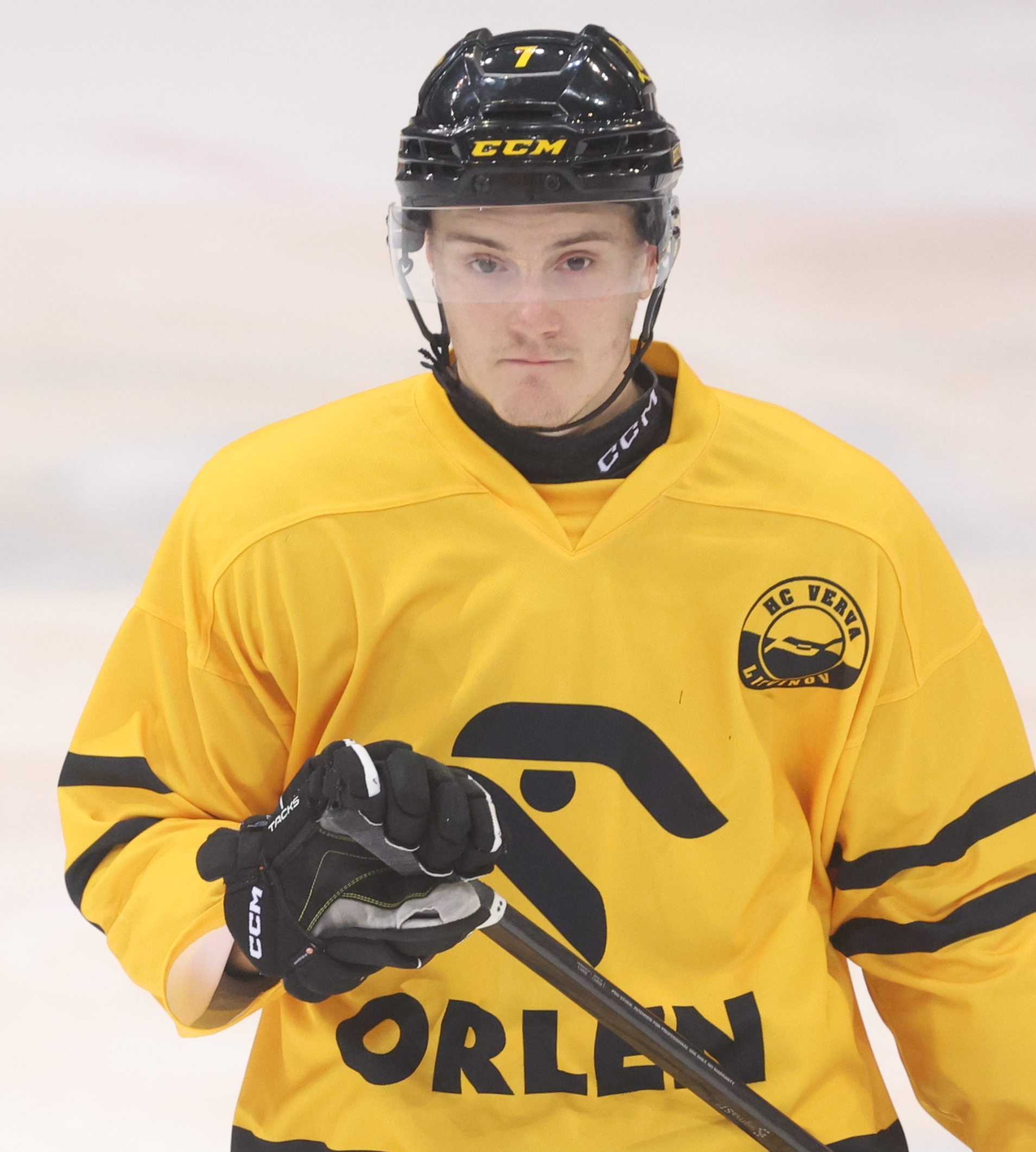
- Born: 24 December 1997 (age 28) Riga, Latvia
- Height: 6 ft 1 in (185 cm)
- Weight: 187 lb (85 kg; 13 st 5 lb)
- Position: Defence
- Shoots: Left
- ELH team Former teams: Bílí Tygři Liberec; Dinamo Riga; Örebro HK; HC Litvínov
- National team: Latvia
- Playing career: 2015–present

Kristaps Roberts Zīle (born 24 December 1997) is a Latvian professional ice hockey player who is a defenceman for Bílí Tygři Liberec of the Czech Extraliga (ELH).

== Playing career ==
Zīle started his junior career in Latvia and joined Dinamo Riga youth club HK Riga of MHL in 2014. Next season on January 17, 2016 he made his KHL debut in 4:2 win against Admiral Vladivostok. He is signed with Dinamo Riga through 2019.

== International play ==
Medal record

Representing Latvia

Ice hockey

World Championships
Bronze medal – third place	2023 Finland/Latvia	

Zīle represented Latvia on junior level. He was selected by Bob Hartley for 2018 world championships roster. He made his WC debut on opening game against Norway.

He represented Latvia at the 2023 IIHF World Championship where he recorded two assists and won a bronze medal, Latvia's first ever IIHF World Championship medal.

== Career statistics ==
=== Regular season and playoffs ===
			Regular season					Playoffs
Season	Team	League	GP	G	A	Pts	PIM	GP	G	A	Pts	PIM
2012–13	SK Rīga 17	LAT U18	20	2	11	13	12	—	—	—	—	—
2013–14	SK Rīga 18	LAT U20	19	6	7	13	10	—	—	—	—	—
2014–15	HS Prizma/Pardaugava	LAT U18	4	3	5	8	4	—	—	—	—	—
2014–15	HK Rīga	MHL	43	1	9	10	40	3	0	0	0	4
2015–16	Dinamo Rīga	KHL	10	0	1	1	0	—	—	—	—	—
2015–16	HK Rīga	MHL	37	7	15	22	42	—	—	—	—	—
2016–17	Dinamo Rīga	KHL	26	0	2	2	6	—	—	—	—	—
2016–17	HK Rīga	MHL	19	6	8	14	32	—	—	—	—	—
2017–18	Dinamo Rīga	KHL	50	1	8	9	28	—	—	—	—	—
2017–18	HK Rīga	MHL	9	5	3	8	6	—	—	—	—	—
2018–19	Dinamo Rīga	KHL	46	3	4	7	19	—	—	—	—	—
2019–20	Dinamo Rīga	KHL	21	0	2	2	4	—	—	—	—	—
2020–21	Dinamo Rīga	KHL	44	2	5	7	36	—	—	—	—	—
2021–22	Dinamo Rīga	KHL	32	3	6	9	8	—	—	—	—	—
2021–22	Örebro HK	SHL	12	0	4	4	2	6	0	0	0	2
2022–23	HC Litvínov	ELH	50	2	15	17	18	3	0	1	1	0
2023–24	HC Litvínov	ELH	50	4	7	11	37	13	2	2	4	2
2024–25	HC Litvínov	ELH	50	3	13	16	45	4	0	3	3	0
KHL totals			229	9	28	37	101	—	—	—	—	—
SHL totals			12	0	4	4	2	6	0	0	0	2
ELH totals			150	9	35	44	100	20	2	6	8	2

=== International ===
Year	Team	Event	Result	GP	G	A	Pts	PIM
2015	Latvia	WJC D1A	13th	5	0	0	0	0
2015	Latvia	WJC18	9th	6	2	1	3	4
2016	Latvia	WJC D1A	11th	5	1	2	3	0
2017	Latvia	WJC	10th	6	0	0	0	6
2018	Latvia	WC	8th	8	0	0	0	0
2019	Latvia	WC	10th	7	0	0	0	0
2021	Latvia	WC	11th	5	0	0	0	0
2022	Latvia	OG	11th	4	0	0	0	0
2022	Latvia	WC	10th	7	0	0	0	2
2023	Latvia	WC	3rd place, bronze medalist(s)	10	0	2	2	4
2024	Latvia	WC	9th	7	0	2	2	4
2024	Latvia	OGQ	Q	3	0	0	0	2
2025	Latvia	WC	10th	7	1	0	1	0
2026	Latvia	OG	10th	4	1	1	2	2
2026	Latvia	WC	6th	8	0	2	2	4
Junior totals				22	3	3	6	10
Senior totals				58	2	7	9	18
