= Ņikita Jevpalovs =

Latvian ice hockey player

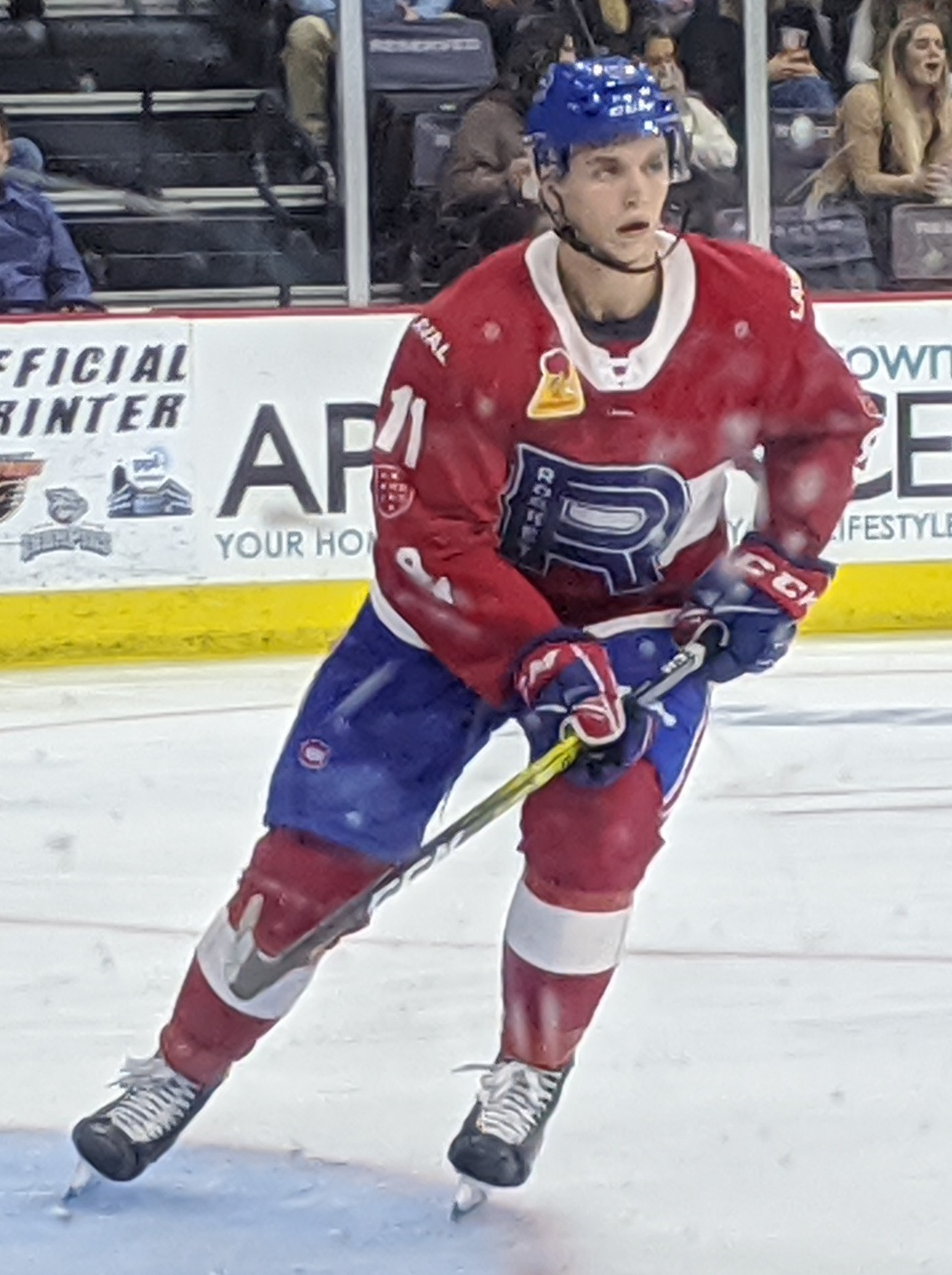
- Ņikita Jevpalovs on 11 January 2020
- Born: 9 September 1994 (age 32) Riga, Latvia
- Height: 6 ft 1 in (185 cm)
- Weight: 205 lb (93 kg; 14 st 9 lb)
- Position: Forward
- Shoots: Right
- Magnus team Former teams: Boxers de Bordeaux; San Jose Barracuda; Dinamo Riga; Laval Rocket; Dornbirn Bulldogs
- National team: Latvia
- NHL draft: Undrafted
- Playing career: 2015–present

Ņikita Jevpalovs (born 9 September 1994) is a Latvian professional ice hockey forward currently playing for the Boxers de Bordeaux in the Ligue Magnus (FRA).

== Playing career ==
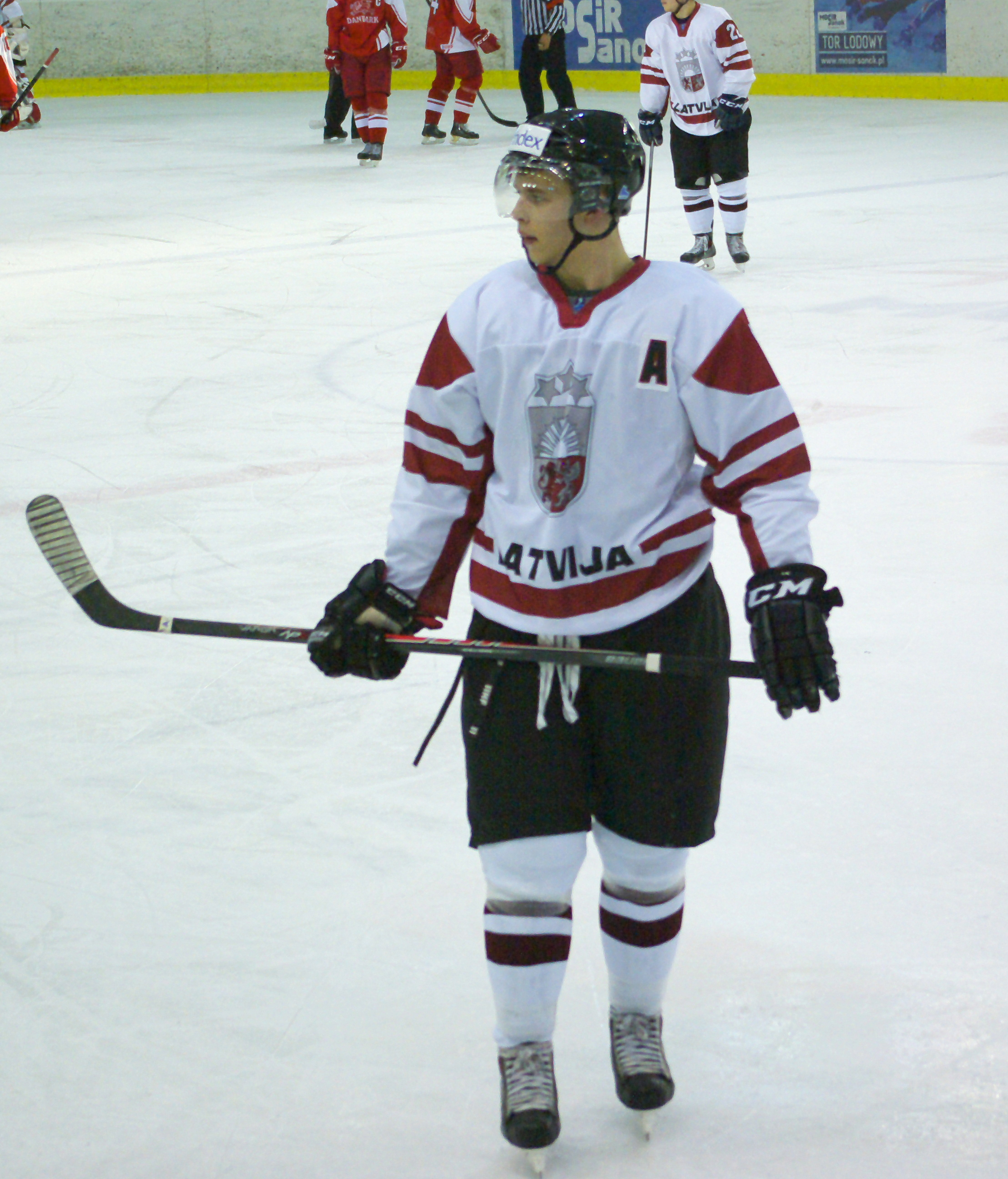
Ņikita Jevpalovs on 19 December 2013.

Jevpavlos spent his junior career between Canada and Latvia, mostly playing in the Quebec Major Junior Hockey League with Blainville-Boisbriand Armada. Undrafted, on 1 January 2015, he was signed by San Jose Sharks to a two-year entry-level agreement.

In his rookie professional season in 2015–16, Jevpavlovs was reassigned by the Sharks between the ECHL and AHL playing for the Allen Americans and San Jose Barracuda. In the following 2016–17 season, he exclusively played with the Barracuda, notching a professional high 13 goals and 21 points in 65 games.

At the expiration of his contract with the Sharks, Jevpalovs was not tendered a qualifying offer and returned to Latvia to play for Dinamo Riga of the Kontinental Hockey League on 4 July 2017. He made his KHL debut in the 2017–18 season opening match against Avangard Omsk, and scored his first goal on 31 August in a defeat to Spartak Moscow. He completed the season scoring just 5 goals and 8 points in 46 games.

As a free agent, Jevpalovs opted for a return to North America, agreeing to a one-year AHL contract with the Laval Rocket, affiliate to the Montreal Canadiens on 1 July 2018. After scoring a career-high 25 points in the AHL, Jevpalovs signed a subsequent one-year, one-way contract with Laval.

Following his second season with the Laval Rocket and with the COVID-19 pandemic delaying the 2020–21 North American season, Jevpalovs opted to remain in Europe by signing a one-year contract with Austrian outfit, the Dornbirn Bulldogs, on 1 September 2020.

== International play ==
Jevpavlos represented Latvia on junior level. He was selected by Bob Hartley for 2018 world championships roster. He made his WC debut on opening game against Norway.

== Career statistics ==
=== Regular season and playoffs ===
			Regular season					Playoffs
Season	Team	League	GP	G	A	Pts	PIM	GP	G	A	Pts	PIM
2010–11	South Muskoka Shield	GMHL	41	48	43	91	28	16	9	18	27	16
2011–12	HK Riga	MHL	58	8	13	21	52	1	1	0	1	2
2012–13	Blainville-Boisbriand Armada	QMJHL	60	18	21	39	26	15	3	5	8	2
2013–14	Blainville-Boisbriand Armada	QMJHL	61	28	26	54	32	20	10	6	16	8
2014–15	Blainville-Boisbriand Armada	QMJHL	64	49	51	100	32	5	1	5	6	4
2015–16	San Jose Barracuda	AHL	60	5	9	14	12	3	1	0	1	0
2015–16	Allen Americans	ECHL	5	1	5	6	2	15	2	6	8	10
2016–17	San Jose Barracuda	AHL	65	13	8	21	41	11	0	0	0	6
2017–18	Dinamo Riga	KHL	46	5	3	8	10	—	—	—	—	—
2018–19	Laval Rocket	AHL	69	13	12	25	38	—	—	—	—	—
2019–20	Laval Rocket	AHL	53	9	13	22	24	—	—	—	—	—
2020–21	Dornbirn Bulldogs	ICEHL	49	15	22	37	22	6	0	1	1	2
2021–22	Dornbirn Bulldogs	ICEHL	38	11	4	15	20	—	—	—	—	—
KHL totals			46	5	8	3	10	—	—	—	—	—

=== International ===
Year	Team	Event	Result	GP	G	A	Pts	PIM
2011	Latvia	WJC18	9th	6	1	2	3	0
2012	Latvia	WJC	9th	6	2	3	5	4
2013	Latvia	WJC	10th	6	2	1	3	8
2014	Latvia	WJC-D1	12th	5	4	5	9	4
2018	Latvia	WC	8th	8	0	0	0	0
Junior totals				23	9	11	20	16
Senior totals				8	0	0	0	0
