= Kristiāns Rubīns =

Latvian ice hockey player (born 1997)

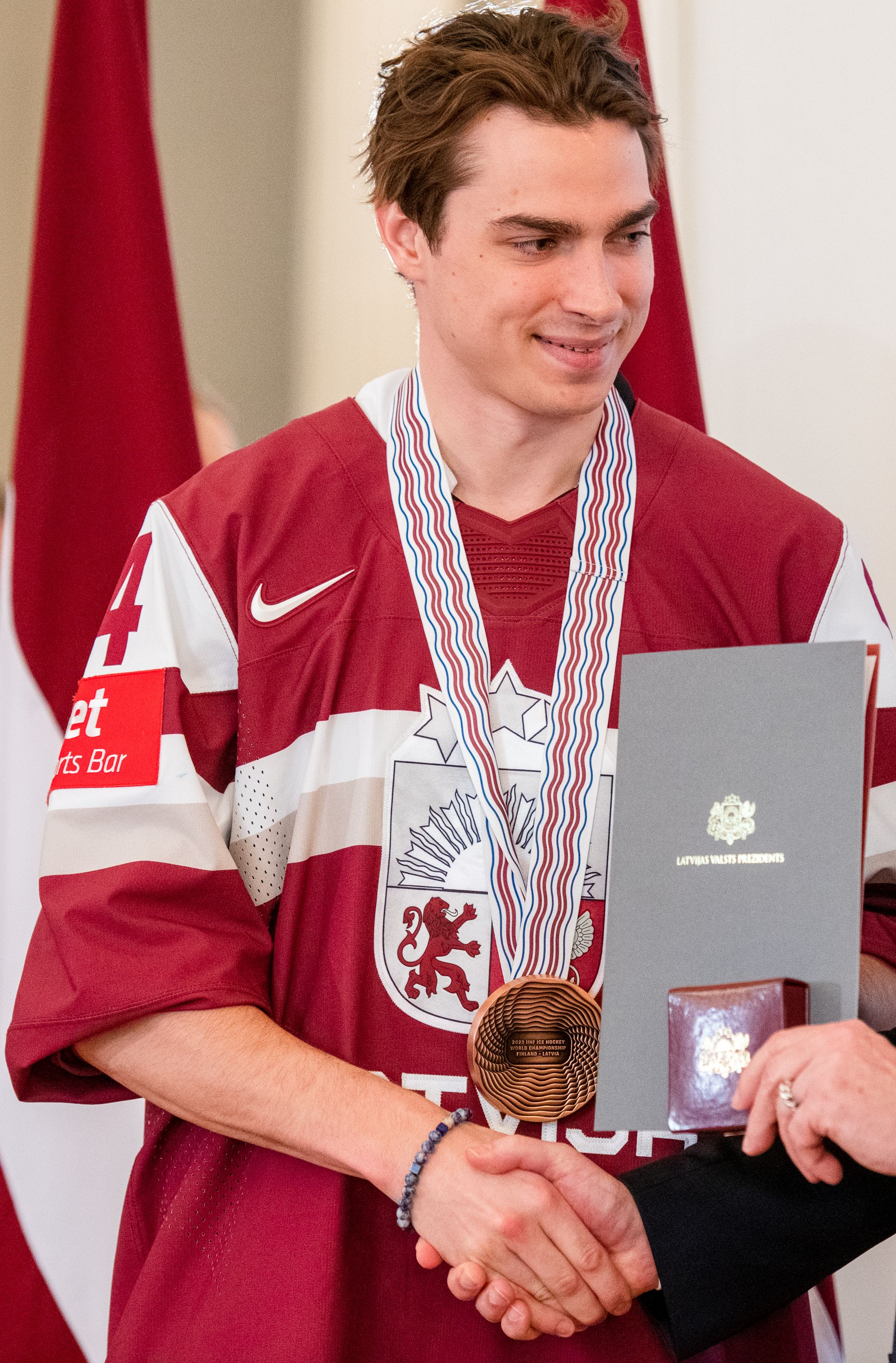
- Kristiāns Rubīns, 2023
- Born: 11 December 1997 (age 28) Riga, Latvia
- Height: 6 ft 5 in (196 cm)
- Weight: 227 lb (103 kg; 16 st 3 lb)
- Position: Defence
- Shoots: Left
- ELH team Former teams: HC Škoda Plzeň; VIK Västerås HK; Frederikshavn White Hawks; Toronto Maple Leafs; Modo Hockey
- National team: Latvia
- NHL draft: Undrafted
- Playing career: 2018–present

Kristiāns Rubīns (born 11 December 1997) is a Latvian professional ice hockey player who is a defenceman for HC Plzeň of the Czech Extraliga (ELH). Playing with the Latvian national team, Rubīns played a central role in the country's first-ever medal at World Championships in 2023.

== Playing career ==
Rubīns played for Latvian junior hockey clubs before departing for Sweden at age 15, joining VIK Västerås HK's junior club. He made his professional debut in the HockeyAllsvenskan with VIK Västerås HK in the 2014–15 season, appearing in ten games, going scoreless. The following season he spent the majority of the season with the junior club, making only four appearances in HockeyAllsvenskan, going scoreless. He was selected by the Medicine Hat Tigers of the Western Hockey League (WHL) in the first round, 16th overall, in the Canadian Hockey League's Import Draft. In his first season with Medicine Hat in 2016–17, he played in 49 games, scoring three goals and 21 assists for 24 points. The Tigers qualified for the playoffs by topping the Central Division but were eventually eliminated by the Lethbridge Hurricanes in the second round. In the playoffs, Rubīns made eleven appearances, recording seven assists. He returned to the Tigers for the 2017–18 season, making 60 appearances and marking seven goals and 27 points. The Tigers made the playoffs and in a rematch of the first round from the previous season, faced the Brandon Wheat Kings. This time, the Wheat Kings got the better of the Tigers, eliminating them. In six playoff games, Rubīns tallied one goal and four points.

On 3 August 2018, he signed a professional contract with the Newfoundland Growlers of the ECHL. He scored the first goal in franchise history in a 3–2 loss to the Florida Everblades. In 56 games in the 2018–19 season with the Growlers, he scored two goals and 16 points. While with the Growlers, he signed a contract with the Toronto Marlies of the American Hockey League (AHL) in October 2018. He made 15 appearances for the Marlies, recording three assists. The Growlers topped the North Division and advanced to the playoffs. He helped the team win the Kelly Cup in the franchise's first season. In 17 playoff games, Rubīns added one goal and three points.

On 3 July 2019, the Marlies re-signed Rubīns. During the 2019–20 season, Rubīns remained in the AHL for the duration of the campaign, posting two goals and 14 points in 47 games before the season was cancelled due to COVID-19 pandemic. On 2 April 2020, Rubīns was signed as an undrafted free agent to a two-year, entry-level contract by the Toronto Maple Leafs of the National Hockey League (NHL).

While the AHL remained shut down, Rubīns returned to Europe and played for the Frederikshavn White Hawks of the Danish Metal Ligaen on loan. In 21 games with the White Hawks, he registered two goals and five points. When AHL play resumed for the 2020–21 season, Rubīns returned to the Marlies where he tallied one goal and three points in 22 games. In the abbreviated season the Marlies finished fouth in the Canadian Division.

He began the 2021–22 season with the Marlies before being recalled by the Maple Leafs on 4 November 2021 with Travis Dermott's ability to play unsure. He did not see any game time until 7 December when he made his NHL debut, a 5–4 win over the Columbus Blue Jackets. He made three appearances for the Maple Leafs going scoreless. In 58 games with the Marlies, he scored one goal and 11 points. The Marlies finished sixth in their division and out of the playoffs.

At the conclusion of his NHL debut season, Rubīns was not extended a qualifying offer by the Maple Leafs to retain his exclusive playing rights, and he was subsequently released to unrestricted free agency. On 13 July 2022, the opening day of free agency, Rubīns signed as a free agent with the Ottawa Senators to a one-year, two way-contract. In the 2022–23 season, Rubīns contributed with two goals and six points through 42 games with Ottawa's AHL affiliate, the Belleville Senators. He missed eight games with a leg injury.

On 10 March 2023, Rubīns was traded by Ottawa to the Calgary Flames in exchange for future considerations. Upon joining the Flames, Rubīns was immediately assigned to the Calgary Wranglers, the team's AHL affiliate for the remainder of the season. He made three regular season appearances with the Wranglers, marking two assists. The Wranglers finished atop the Pacific Division and got a bye to the second round of the playoffs. The Wranglers beat the Abbotsford Canucks to move on to the semifinals but were knocked out by the Coachella Valley Firebirds. Rubīns made six playoff appearances, scoring one goal and three points.

On 6 June 2023, as a pending free agent from the Flames, Rubīns opted to halt his North American career by signing a one-year contract with the newly-promoted Swedish club, Modo Hockey of the Swedish Hockey League (SHL). In his lone season with Modo, he tallied four goals and ten points in 44 games.

In June 2024, Rubīns signed a deal with HC Škoda Plzeň of the Czech Extraliga. On 22 December, he signed a two-year extension with the club. In his first season in the Extraliga, he posted ten goals and 25 points. He added two assists in four playoff games.

== International play ==
Medal record

Representing Latvia

Ice hockey

World Championships
Bronze medal – third place	2023 Finland/Latvia	

Rubīns represented Latvia through the junior level. He was selected by head coach Bob Hartley for Latvia's roster in the 2018 IIHF World Championship. He made his debut in the opening game against Norway. Rubīns was selected to represent the Latvian national team in the 2022 Winter Olympics, but did not play for them when the NHL announced that its players would not be permitted to participate in the 2022 Winter Olympics.

He represented Latvia at the 2023 IIHF World Championship where he recorded two goals, including the game-winning overtime goal to defeat the United States and won a bronze medal, Latvia's first ever IIHF World Championship medal.

== Career statistics ==
=== Regular season and playoffs ===
			Regular season					Playoffs
Season	Team	League	GP	G	A	Pts	PIM	GP	G	A	Pts	PIM
2011–12	Prizma/Pārdaugava	LAT U16	24	6	12	18	20	—	—	—	—	—
2012–13	Prizma/Pārdaugava	LAT U16	—	14	13	27	—	—	—	—	—	—
2012–13	Prizma/Pārdaugava	LAT U18	20	11	7	18	22	—	—	—	—	—
2013–14	VIK Västerås HK	J18	22	5	10	15	22	—	—	—	—	—
2013–14	VIK Västerås HK	J18 Allsv	18	5	3	8	50	5	0	1	1	4
2014–15	VIK Västerås HK	J18	2	0	1	1	0	—	—	—	—	—
2014–15	VIK Västerås HK	J18 Allsv	2	0	1	1	2	—	—	—	—	—
2014–15	VIK Västerås HK	J20	31	4	3	7	14	2	0	0	0	0
2014–15	VIK Västerås HK	Allsv	10	0	0	0	4	—	—	—	—	—
2015–16	VIK Västerås HK	J20	21	3	8	11	14	—	—	—	—	—
2015–16	VIK Västerås HK	Allsv	4	0	0	0	0	—	—	—	—	—
2016–17	Medicine Hat Tigers	WHL	49	3	21	24	14	11	0	7	7	8
2017–18	Medicine Hat Tigers	WHL	60	7	20	27	36	6	1	3	4	2
2018–19	Newfoundland Growlers	ECHL	56	2	16	18	28	17	1	2	3	23
2018–19	Toronto Marlies	AHL	15	0	3	3	4	1	0	0	0	0
2019–20	Toronto Marlies	AHL	47	2	12	14	6	—	—	—	—	—
2020–21	Frederikshavn White Hawks	DEN	21	2	3	5	2	—	—	—	—	—
2020–21	Toronto Marlies	AHL	22	1	2	3	8	—	—	—	—	—
2021–22	Toronto Marlies	AHL	58	1	10	11	24	—	—	—	—	—
2021–22	Toronto Maple Leafs	NHL	3	0	0	0	4	—	—	—	—	—
2022–23	Belleville Senators	AHL	42	2	4	6	25	—	—	—	—	—
2022–23	Calgary Wranglers	AHL	3	0	2	2	0	6	1	2	3	0
2023–24	MoDo Hockey	SHL	44	4	6	10	14	—	—	—	—	—
NHL totals			3	0	0	0	4	—	—	—	—	—
SHL totals			44	4	6	10	14	—	—	—	—	—

=== International ===
Year	Team	Event	Result	GP	G	A	Pts	PIM
2014	Latvia	U18 D1A	11th	5	0	0	0	25
2015	Latvia	WJC D1A	13th	5	0	4	4	2
2015	Latvia	U18	9th	6	0	2	2	2
2016	Latvia	WJC D1A	11th	5	0	1	1	0
2017	Latvia	WJC	10th	6	0	0	0	2
2018	Latvia	WC	8th	8	1	1	2	2
2021	Latvia	WC	11th	6	1	1	2	2
2021	Latvia	OGQ	Q	3	1	1	2	2
2022	Latvia	WC	10th	4	0	0	0	0
2023	Latvia	WC	3rd place, bronze medalist(s)	4	2	0	2	2
2024	Latvia	OGQ	Q	2	1	2	3	0
2025	Latvia	WC	10th	7	1	1	2	2
2026	Latvia	OG	10th	4	0	0	0	2
Junior totals				27	0	7	7	31
Senior totals				38	7	6	13	12

== Awards and honours ==
Award	Year
ECHL
Kelly Cup champion	2019

== Bibliography ==
- Chaimovitch, Jason, ed. (2025). 2025–2026 American Hockey League Official Guide & Record Book. Springfield, Massachusetts: American Hockey League. OCLC 22147888.
