= Minnesota Wilderness (NA3HL) =

- City: Eveleth, Minnesota
- League: North American 3 Hockey League
- Division: West
- Founded: 2012
- Home arena: Eveleth Hippodrome
- Owner: Barry Bohman
- General manager: Dave Boitz
- Head coach: Mike Muller
- Affiliates: Minnesota Wilderness
- Website: wildernesshockey.com

Franchise history
- 2012–2020: Breezy Point North Stars
- 2021–2023: Minnesota Loons
- 2024–present: Minnesota Wilderness

The Minnesota Wilderness are a USA Hockey-sanctioned Tier III Junior ice hockey team playing in the North American 3 Hockey League (NA3HL). The team plays their home games at the Eveleth Hippodrome in Eveleth, Minnesota. The organization was originally known as the Breezy Point North Stars and was founded as a non-profit corporation operated by Whitebirch, Inc. The organization had been re-branded as was formerly known as the "Minnesota Loons".

== History ==
Established in 2012, the North Stars were originally managed by Joe Bergquist. The first head coach was Brian Henrichs. The first victory in franchise history came in their ninth league game, a 3–2 win over the Alexandria Blizzard on October 19, 2012.

After two seasons and just 12 victories, Henrichs was replaced by Jeff Worlton, a former minor league player and head coach in the North American Hockey League. In 2016, Worlton would be hired mid-season by the North American Hockey League's Kenai River Brown Bears and assistant coach Josh Dallman would take over as head coach. At the end of the 2015–16 season, Dallman would also leave to work for Worlton again in Kenai and the North Stars would hire Jon Jonasson, former head coach of the Helena Bighorns, as head coach for 2016–17. Jonasson left after one season and was replaced by DJ Vold. Former professional player Mike Muller was hired as the head coach for the 2019–20 season.

After the 2019–20 season, the team stated it would not be participating in the following season. After one dormant season, the franchise was sold in 2021 to MHCPA, LLC, an ownership group composed of Craig Larson, Anthony Maucieri, and former NHL player Chris Stewart. The franchise was reactivated as the Minnesota Loons for the 2021–22 season and the new management re-hired Muller as head coach.

After the 2023-24 season, the Minnesota Loons moved from Breezy Point to Eveleth, Minnesota, where they went under the umbrella of the Minnesota Wilderness. They will use the same name, colors, logos, and uniforms.

== Season-by-season records ==
| Season | GP | W | L | OTL | SOL | Pts | GF | GA | PIM | Regular season finish | Playoffs |
|---|---|---|---|---|---|---|---|---|---|---|---|
| 2012–13 | 48 | 4 | 43 | 0 | 1 | 9 | 86 | 264 | 868 | 6th of 6, West Div. 17th of 17, NA3HL | Did not qualify |
| 2013–14 | 48 | 8 | 38 | 2 | — | 18 | 107 | 290 | 891 | 6th of 6, West Div. 20th of 21, NA3HL | Did not qualify |
| 2014–15 | 47 | 14 | 30 | 3 | — | 31 | 133 | 167 | 1273 | 5th of 6, West Div. 24th of 31, NA3HL | Did not qualify |
| 2015–16 | 47 | 22 | 17 | 8 | — | 52 | 142 | 151 | 918 | 3rd of 5, West Div. 20th of 34, NA3HL | Lost Div. Semifinals, 1–2 vs. Twin City Steel |
| 2016–17 | 47 | 25 | 19 | 3 | 0 | 53 | 189 | 154 | 1067 | 4th of 5, West Div. 21st of 48, NA3HL | Lost Div. Semifinals, 0–2 vs. Granite City Lumberjacks |
| 2017–18 | 47 | 15 | 30 | 2 | 0 | 32 | 142 | 239 | 856 | 5th of 5, West Div. 33rd of 42, NA3HL | Did not qualify |
| 2018–19 | 47 | 14 | 28 | 3 | 2 | 33 | 132 | 221 | 1191 | 6th of 7, West Div. 26th of 36, NA3HL | Did not qualify |
| 2019–20 | 47 | 9 | 37 | 1 | 0 | 19 | 113 | 344 | 1159 | 6th of 6, West Div. 31st of 34, NA3HL | Did not qualify |
| 2020–21 | Franchise dormant | | | | | | | | | | |
Minnesota Loons
| 2021–22 | 47 | 5 | 42 | 0 | 0 | 10 | 88 | 341 | 1001 | 6th of 6, West Div. 33rd of 34, NA3HL | Did not qualify for post season play |
| 2022–23 | 47 | 13 | 31 | 2 | 1 | 29 | 136 | 198 | 1208 | 6th of 6, West Div. 29th of 34, NA3HL | Did not qualify for post season play |
| 2023–24 | 47 | 3 | 42 | 1 | 1 | 8 | 79 | 367 | 843 | 6th of 6, West Div. 33rd of 34, NA3HL | Did not qualify for post season play |
Minnesota Wilderness
| 2024–25 | 47 | 20 | 23 | 2 | 2 | 44 | 153 | 175 | 682 | 5th of 6, West Div. 33rd of 34, NA3HL | Did not qualify for post season play |
| 2025–26 | 47 | 10 | 36 | 0 | 1 | 21 | 136 | 228 | 658 | 6th of 6, West Div. 35th of 38, NA3HL | Did not qualify for post season play |

== Alumni ==
The North Stars have had a number of alumni move on to collegiate programs and higher levels of junior ice hockey in the United States and Canada.
