= Anders Poulsen (ice hockey) =

Danish ice hockey player

- Born: January 18, 1991 (age 34) Herning, Denmark
- Height: 6 ft 0 in (183 cm)
- Weight: 190 lb (86 kg; 13 st 8 lb)
- Position: Forward
- Shot: Left
- Played for: Herning Blue Fox; IK Oskarshamn; Rungsted Seier Capital; EHF Passau Black Hawks; Comet Halden
- National team: Denmark
- NHL draft: Undrafted
- Playing career: 2009–2023

Anders H. Poulsen (born January 18, 1991) is a Danish ice hockey player. He is currently playing with the IK Oskarshamn of the HockeyAllsvenskan.

== International ==
Poulsen was named to the Denmark men's national ice hockey team for competition at the 2014 IIHF World Championship.

== Career statistics ==
			Regular season					Playoffs
Season	Team	League	GP	G	A	Pts	PIM	GP	G	A	Pts	PIM
2006–07	Herning Blue Fox U20	Denmark U20	2	0	0	0	0	—	—	—	—	—
2007–08	Herning Blue Fox U17	Denmark U17	12	15	16	31	14	—	—	—	—	—
2007–08	Herning Blue Fox U20	Denmark U20	16	2	8	10	2	5	0	3	3	2
2007–08	Herning Blue Fox II	Denmark2	8	0	0	0	2	1	0	0	0	0
2008–09	Malmö Redhawks J18	J18 Elit	17	7	7	14	22	—	—	—	—	—
2008–09	Malmö Redhawks J18	J18 Allsvenskan	3	0	3	3	0	—	—	—	—	—
2008–09	Malmö Redhawks J20	J20 SuperElit	2	0	0	0	0	—	—	—	—	—
2008–09	Herning Blue Fox U20	Denmark U20	7	4	4	8	6	2	3	3	6	14
2008–09	Herning Blue Fox II	Denmark2	4	1	2	3	2	5	0	2	2	2
2009–10	Herning Blue Fox U20	Denmark U20	—	—	—	—	—	1	0	2	2	4
2009–10	Herning Blue Fox	Denmark	33	6	7	13	6	12	0	2	2	8
2010–11	Herning Blue Fox	Denmark	39	7	8	15	10	14	7	2	9	4
2011–12	Herning Blue Fox	Denmark	32	11	7	18	16	17	4	0	4	4
2012–13	Herning Blue Fox	Denmark	40	15	24	39	12	5	2	3	5	0
2013–14	Herning Blue Fox	Denmark	37	18	17	35	2	15	5	4	9	14
2014–15	IK Oskarshamn	HockeyAllsvenskan	52	2	1	3	10	—	—	—	—	—
2015–16	IK Oskarshamn	HockeyAllsvenskan	50	3	9	12	12	5	0	1	1	0
2016–17	IK Oskarshamn	HockeyAllsvenskan	16	0	2	2	4	—	—	—	—	—
2017–18	Herning Blue Fox	Denmark	35	9	13	22	14	10	3	0	3	2
2018–19	Herning Blue Fox	Denmark	18	3	5	8	4	5	1	0	1	0
2019–20	Rungsted Seier Capital	Denmark	19	5	10	15	2	—	—	—	—	—
2020–21	Herning Blue Fox	Denmark	33	8	10	18	8	4	1	0	1	4
2021–22	EHF Passau Black Hawks	Germany3	30	5	22	27	10	—	—	—	—	—
2022–23	Comet Halden	Norway2	24	12	15	27	8	11	3	6	9	8
HockeyAllsvenskan totals			118	5	12	17	26	5	0	1	1	0
Denmark totals			286	82	101	183	74	82	23	11	34	36
