= Minsk Ice Palace =

Indoor sporting arena in Minsk, Belarus

Coordinates: 53°54′27″N 27°29′11″E

Minsk Ice Palace is an indoor sporting arena located in Minsk, Belarus. It is used to host various indoor events. The arena seats 3,000 spectators and opened in 1999.

== History ==
The designers of the project for the Minsk Ice Palace were architects from the Belpromproject Institute: F. Potapov, I. I. Bout and A. S. Shafranovich. The construction of the arena was started by the owners of Tivali Minsk hockey club in 1997. However, the club could not agree on financing for the construction which then had to be stopped with only the foundations being built. The construction of the palace continued later that year with assistance from the Belarusian state assisting with the funding. The facility became fully operational in February 1999. Between 2007 and 2009, it underwent renovations that were also funded by Belarus. In 2014, the Minsk City Council of Deputies announced that the Minsk Ice Palace generated 500,000 Belarusian rubles in turnover.

In 2009, the band Cradle of Filth were scheduled to play a concert at the Minsk Ice Palace, however they were unable to make it due to a breakdown. The Ice Palace director refused to issue refunds that resulted in a lawsuit where the Minsk district court ruled that the organiser was liable and would have to pay 100 million Belarusian rubles in compensation with an extra 50 million to 300 individual fans. In 2015, a Belarusian media report investigated all of Belarus' ice hockey arenas and discovered that out of the ten in the country with a capacity of over 500, the Minsk Ice Arena was the only one of two arenas that were considered to be profitable. This was despite the Minsk Ice Arena no longer hosting professional ice hockey following the folding of Keramin Minsk in 2010.
