= Ronalds Ķēniņš =

Latvian ice hockey player (born 1991)

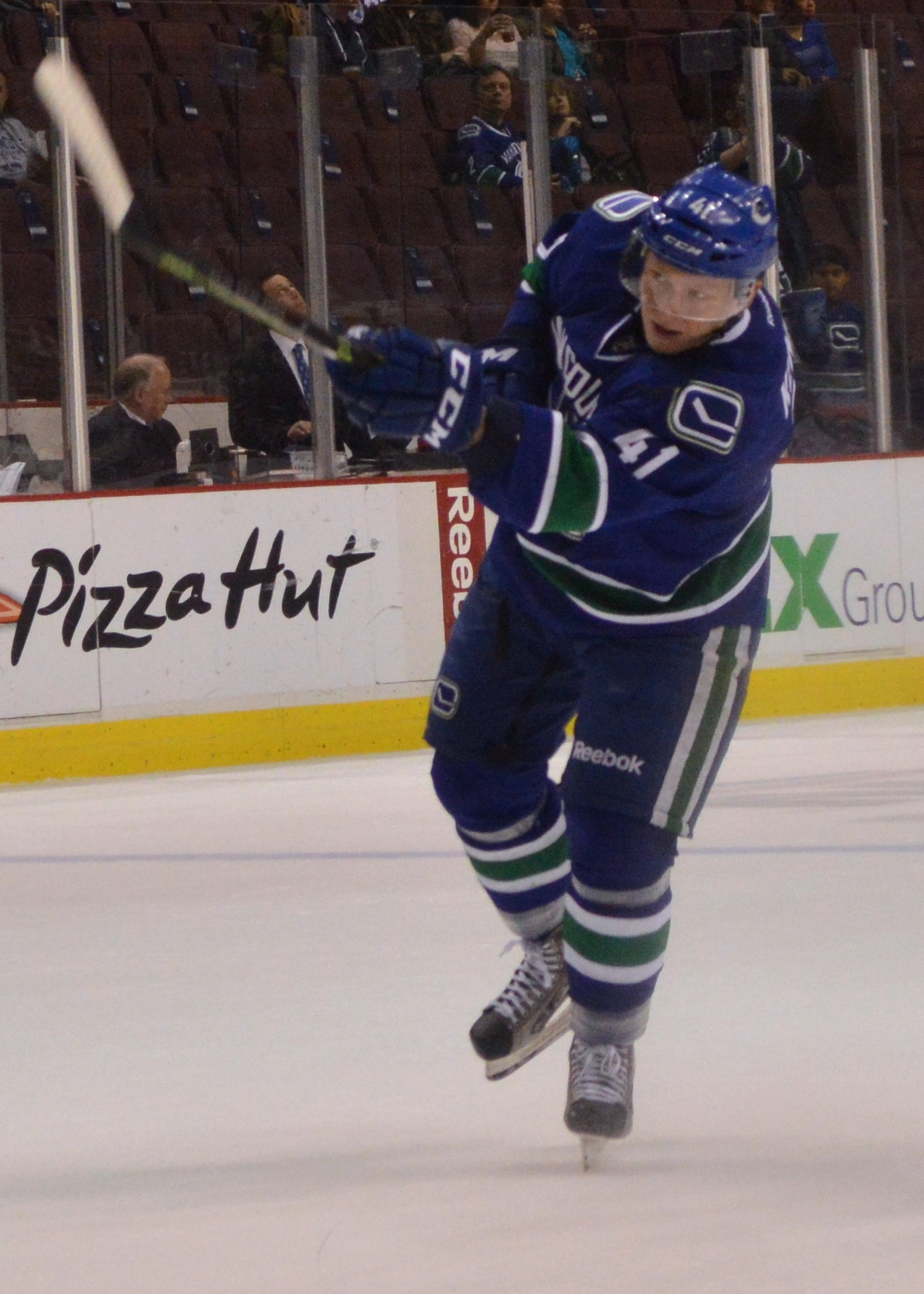
- Ķēniņš with Vancouver Canucks in February 2015
- Born: February 28, 1991 (age 35) Riga, Latvia
- Height: 6 ft 0 in (183 cm)
- Weight: 201 lb (91 kg; 14 st 5 lb)
- Position: Winger
- Shoots: Left
- Latvia team Former teams: Kyiv Capitals; ZSC Lions; Vancouver Canucks; Lausanne HC; HC Martigny; HPK
- National team: Latvia
- NHL draft: Undrafted
- Playing career: 2008–present

Ronalds Ķēniņš (born February 28, 1991) is a Latvian professional ice hockey player who is a winger for the Kyiv Capitals of the Latvian Hockey Higher League. He played 38 games for the Vancouver Canucks of the National Hockey League (NHL) between 2015 and 2016.

== Playing career ==
Ķēniņš played junior ice hockey in Latvia and Switzerland. At 17 years of age, he started his professional career with GCK Lions of the National League B (NLB), Switzerland's second-tier league, in 2008–09. After three seasons with the Lions organization, Ķēniņš joined ZSC Lions of the top-tier National League A (NLA). Following the 2012–13 season, he was signed by the Vancouver Canucks on July 30, 2013. He remained in Switzerland for the 2013–14 season and recorded an NLA career-high eight goals and 25 points in 39 games.

Ķēniņš moved to North America for the 2014–15 season and was assigned to the Canucks' American Hockey League (AHL) affiliate, the Utica Comets. After being called up midway through the season, Ķēniņš made his NHL debut on January 30, 2015, against the Buffalo Sabres (a team that featured fellow Latvian Zemgus Girgensons and the former Latvian national team's head coach, Ted Nolan). The following game, Ķēniņš scored his first career NHL goal against Devan Dubnyk of the Minnesota Wild on February 1. On April 17, Ķēniņš scored his first career Stanley Cup playoff goal on a one-timer assisted by linemate and fellow rookie Bo Horvat.

On August 17, 2016, Ķēniņš agreed as a free agent to a two-year contract with his former team, the ZSC Lions of the National League (NL). Ķēniņš playrd with a Swiss player-licence and was not considered an import player in the NL.

On April 28, 2018, Ķēniņš signed a three-year contract with fellow NL club, Lausanne HC. On May 8, 2021, he signed a five-year contract extension. On December 29, 2022, Ķēniņš was loaned to HC Sierre of the Swiss League (SL).

On November 13, 2024, Ķēniņš and Lausanne HC mutually agreed to terminate the contract. He had not played any games for the team during the 2023–24 season but had played seven games on loan to HC Sierre. The next day, Ķēniņš signed a try-out contract with SC Bern that was valid until December 22, with an option to extend it until the end of the season.

== International play ==
Medal record

Men's ice hockey

Representing Latvia

World Championships
Bronze medal – third place	2023 Finland/Latvia	

At the junior level, Ķēniņš played for Latvia in two World U18 Championships (second tier Division I play) and two World Junior Championships (one year in Division I and another in the top tier). He made his debut with Latvia senior team at the 2011 World Championship and has gone on to play in 2012, 2013 and 2014. In February 2014, he played for Latvia at the 2014 Winter Olympics.

He represented Latvia at the 2023 World Championship where he recorded one assist and won a bronze medal, Latvia's first-ever IIHF World Championship medal.

== Career statistics ==
=== Regular season and playoffs ===
			Regular season					Playoffs
Season	Team	League	GP	G	A	Pts	PIM	GP	G	A	Pts	PIM
2006–07	HK Liepājas Metalurgs	LAT U18	—	1	3	4	12	—	—	—	—	—
2007–08	Pikes Oberthurgau	SUI U17	30	14	21	35	60	4	0	3	3	18
2008–09	GCK Lions II	SUI.2 U20	6	6	6	12	6	—	—	—	—	—
2008–09	GCK Lions	SUI.2	42	2	8	10	24	—	—	—	—	—
2009–10	GCK Lions	SUI U20	30	13	18	31	38	9	0	4	4	10
2009–10	GCK Lions	SUI.2	4	1	3	4	4	—	—	—	—	—
2010–11	GCK Lions	SUI U20	18	7	14	21	45	11	7	13	20	24
2010–11	GCK Lions	SUI.2	11	1	2	3	8	—	—	—	—	—
2011–12	ZSC Lions	NLA	47	6	12	18	48	15	0	4	4	6
2012–13	ZSC Lions	NLA	45	3	14	17	12	12	4	4	8	10
2013–14	ZSC Lions	NLA	39	8	17	25	40	18	4	0	4	6
2014–15	Utica Comets	AHL	36	5	7	12	23	—	—	—	—	—
2014–15	Vancouver Canucks	NHL	30	4	8	12	8	5	1	1	2	4
2015–16	Utica Comets	AHL	41	5	18	23	44	4	0	2	2	2
2015–16	Vancouver Canucks	NHL	8	0	0	0	6	—	—	—	—	—
2016–17	ZSC Lions	NLA	45	6	9	15	65	6	0	1	1	2
2017–18	ZSC Lions	NL	40	1	9	10	57	18	5	5	10	14
2018–19	Lausanne HC	NL	49	10	19	29	47	12	3	3	6	16
2019–20	Lausanne HC	NL	44	5	15	20	34	—	—	—	—	—
2020–21	Lausanne HC	NL	51	9	26	35	49	6	1	2	3	6
2021–22	Lausanne HC	NL	43	7	13	20	24	8	1	2	3	10
2022–23	Lausanne HC	NL	46	3	2	5	32	—	—	—	—	—
2022–23	HC Sierre	SL	2	0	2	2	2	—	—	—	—	—
NL totals			449	58	136	194	408	95	18	21	39	70
NHL totals			38	4	8	12	14	5	1	1	2	4

=== International ===
Year	Team	Event	Result	GP	G	A	Pts	PIM
2008	Latvia	U18 D1	13th	5	0	1	1	2
2009	Latvia	U18 D1	12th	5	3	0	3	4
2010	Latvia	WJC	9th	6	2	2	4	6
2011	Latvia	WJC D1	11th	5	0	3	3	4
2011	Latvia	WC	13th	6	0	0	0	0
2012	Latvia	WC	10th	5	1	2	3	6
2013	Latvia	OGQ	Q	3	1	1	2	2
2013	Latvia	WC	11th	7	0	1	1	6
2014	Latvia	OG	8th	5	0	0	0	2
2014	Latvia	WC	11th	7	0	4	4	4
2016	Latvia	WC	13th	6	1	0	1	27
2016	Latvia	OGQ	DNQ	3	1	2	3	4
2017	Latvia	WC	10th	7	0	0	0	2
2018	Latvia	WC	8th	8	2	1	3	4
2019	Latvia	WC	10th	7	2	2	4	6
2021	Latvia	WC	11th	7	1	3	4	12
2021	Latvia	OGQ	Q	3	2	4	6	0
2022	Latvia	OG	11th	4	1	0	1	0
2022	Latvia	WC	10th	7	0	2	2	2
2023	Latvia	WC	3rd place, bronze medalist(s)	7	0	1	1	0
Junior totals				21	5	6	11	16
Senior totals				92	12	23	35	77
