= Nicolas Ritz =

French ice hockey player (born 1992)

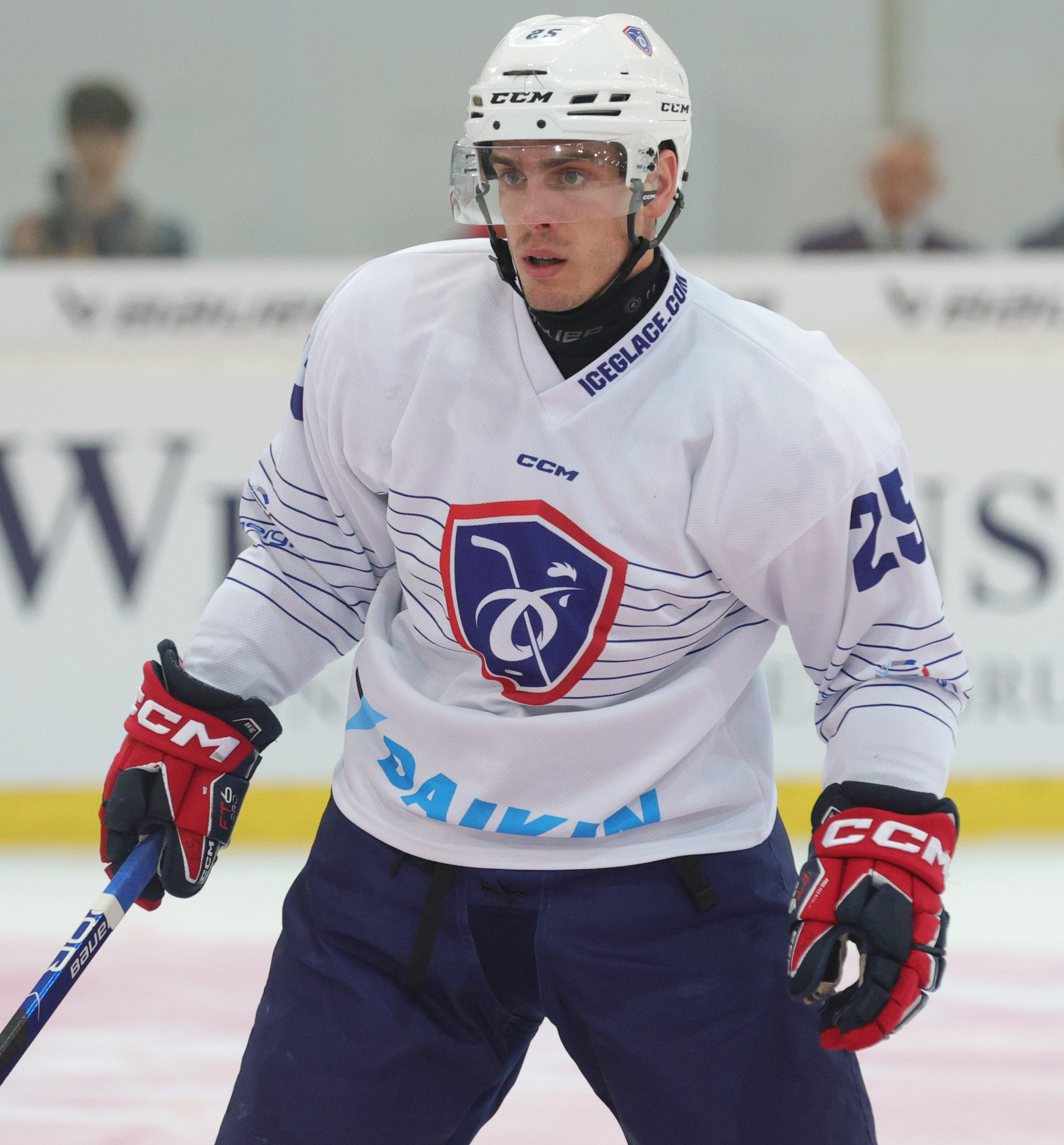
- Ritz with France in 2024
- Born: 26 February 1992 (age 34) Dijon, France
- Height: 5 ft 11 in (180 cm)
- Weight: 176 lb (80 kg; 12 st 8 lb)
- Position: Centre
- Shoots: Left
- LM team Former teams: Ducs d'Angers; Ducs de Dijon; HPK; Rapaces de Gap; Lillehammer IK; Herning Blue Fox; Dragons de Rouen
- National team: France
- Playing career: 2009–present

Nicolas Ritz (born 26 February 1992) is a French professional ice hockey player who is a centre for Ducs d'Angers of Ligue Magnus.

== International play ==
Ritz represented the France national team at the 2026 Winter Olympics and the 2013 and 2014 IIHF World Championships.
