= EHF Passau Black Hawks =

- City: Passau, Germany
- League: Oberliga
- Founded: 1994
- Home arena: Eisarena Passau
- Colours: Red, White, Black

The EHF Passau Black Hawks are an ice hockey team in Passau, Germany. They play in the Oberliga (ice hockey), the third level of German ice hockey. The club was founded in 1994 and has played in the Oberliga since the 2007/08 season.
