= Mario Altmann =

Austrian ice hockey player (born 1986)

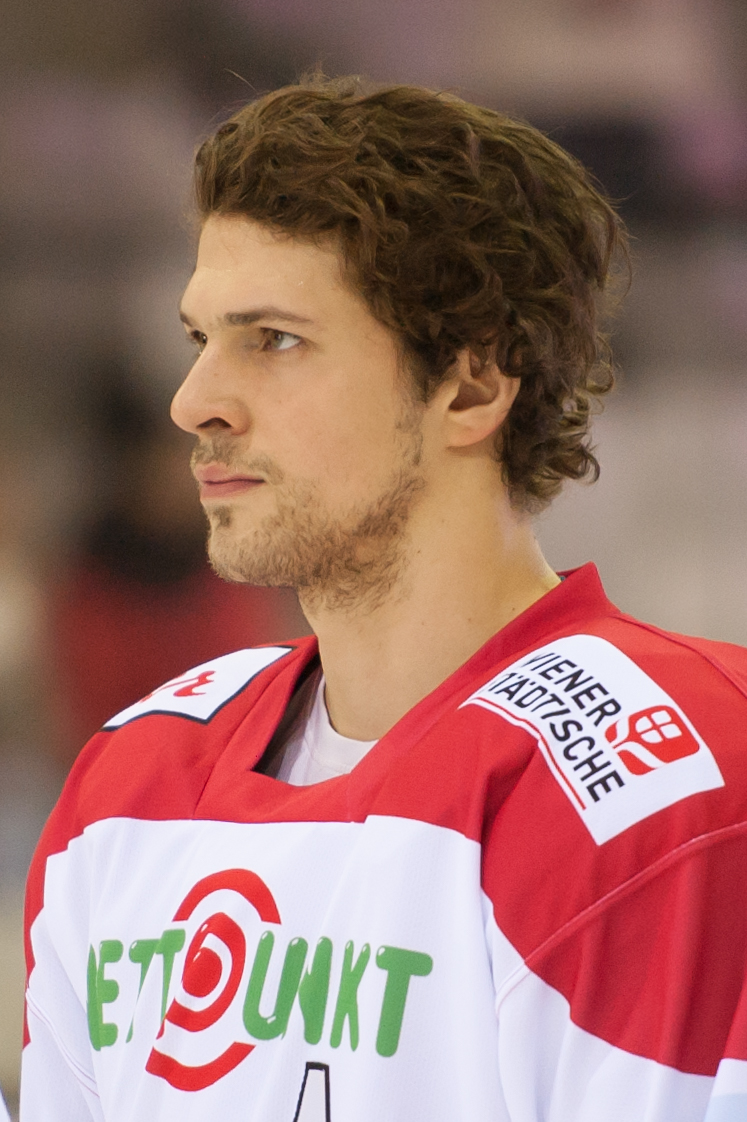
- Born: November 4, 1986 (age 38) Vienna, Austria
- Height: 6 ft 4 in (193 cm)
- Weight: 214 lb (97 kg; 15 st 4 lb)
- Position: Defence
- Shoots: Left
- ICEHL team Former teams: Graz99ers; Vienna Capitals; Örebro HK; EC VSV; EHC Black Wings Linz
- National team: Austria
- Playing career: 2004–present

Mario Altmann (born November 4, 1986) is an Austrian professional ice hockey player. He is currently playing with Graz99ers of the ICE Hockey League (ICEHL).

== Playing career ==
Having previously played five seasons in the EBEL with EC VSV, on April 16, 2015, Altmann signed a one-year contract with Austrian rivals EHC Black Wings Linz.

After five seasons with the Black Wings in Linz, Altmann left as a free agent and signed a one-year contract with Graz99ers on 14 August 2020.

== International play ==
Altmann is a long-time member of the Austria men's national ice hockey team who has participated at the 2009, 2011, and 2011 IIHF World Championships, and also at the 2014 Winter Olympics.

== Career statistics ==
=== Regular season and playoffs ===
			Regular season					Playoffs
Season	Team	League	GP	G	A	Pts	PIM	GP	G	A	Pts	PIM
2001–02	Wiener Eislöwen	AUT U20	6	0	0	0	4	—	—	—	—	—
2003–04	Wiener Eislöwen	AUT U20	13	4	3	7	0	—	—	—	—	—
2003–04	Wiener Eislöwen	AUT.2	18	1	3	4	6	—	—	—	—	—
2004–05	Junior Capitals	AUT U20	7	4	7	11	4	—	—	—	—	—
2004–05	Vienna Capitals	EBEL	42	0	3	3	10	10	0	0	0	2
2005–06	Junior Capitals	AUT U20	3	0	0	0	2	—	—	—	—	—
2005–06	Vienna Capitals	EBEL	32	0	3	3	24	—	—	—	—	—
2006–07	Vienna Capitals	EBEL	56	2	4	6	36	3	0	0	0	0
2007–08	Vienna Capitals	EBEL	46	0	4	4	24	7	0	1	1	2
2008–09	Vienna Capitals	EBEL	32	1	5	6	22	11	2	1	3	6
2009–10	Örebro HK	Allsv	9	0	0	0	4	—	—	—	—	—
2009–10	Karlskrona HK	SWE.3	22	7	5	12	8	3	0	0	0	2
2010–11	EC VSV	EBEL	54	3	6	9	46	10	0	3	3	8
2011–12	EC VSV	EBEL	38	3	7	10	16	—	—	—	—	—
2012–13	EC VSV	EBEL	53	14	31	45	42	7	0	2	2	4
2013–14	EC VSV	EBEL	36	4	8	12	20	9	1	3	4	4
2014–15	EC VSV	EBEL	39	2	11	13	22	5	0	0	0	4
2015–16	EHC Liwest Black Wings Linz	EBEL	54	2	6	8	26	12	3	0	3	8
2016–17	EHC Liwest Black Wings Linz	EBEL	53	2	8	10	20	5	0	0	0	2
2017–18	EHC Liwest Black Wings Linz	EBEL	44	0	12	12	18	12	2	3	5	12
2018–19	EHC Liwest Black Wings Linz	EBEL	29	1	4	5	12	—	—	—	—	—
2019–20	EHC Liwest Black Wings Linz	EBEL	37	0	6	6	26	3	0	0	0	2
2020–21	Graz99ers	ICEHL	50	2	5	7	30	—	—	—	—	—
2021–22	Graz99ers	ICEHL	48	2	9	11	16	1	0	0	0	0
AUT totals			743	38	132	170	410	95	8	13	21	54

=== International ===
Year	Team	Event	GP	G	A	Pts	PIM
2004	Austria	WJC18 D1	5	1	2	3	0
2005	Austria	WJC D1	5	0	0	0	0
2009	Austria	OGQ	1	0	0	0	0
2009	Austria	WC	3	0	0	0	0
2011	Austria	WC	6	0	0	0	0
2012	Austria	WC D1A	5	1	0	1	2
2013	Austria	WC	7	1	1	2	0
2014	Austria	OG	4	0	0	0	6
2014	Austria	WC D1A	5	1	1	2	4
2015	Austria	WC	5	0	0	0	0
2016	Austria	OGQ	3	0	0	0	6
2018	Austria	WC	7	0	0	0	0
Junior totals			10	1	2	3	0
Senior totals			49	3	3	6	20
