= Olivier Magnan =

Canadian ice hockey player (born 1986)

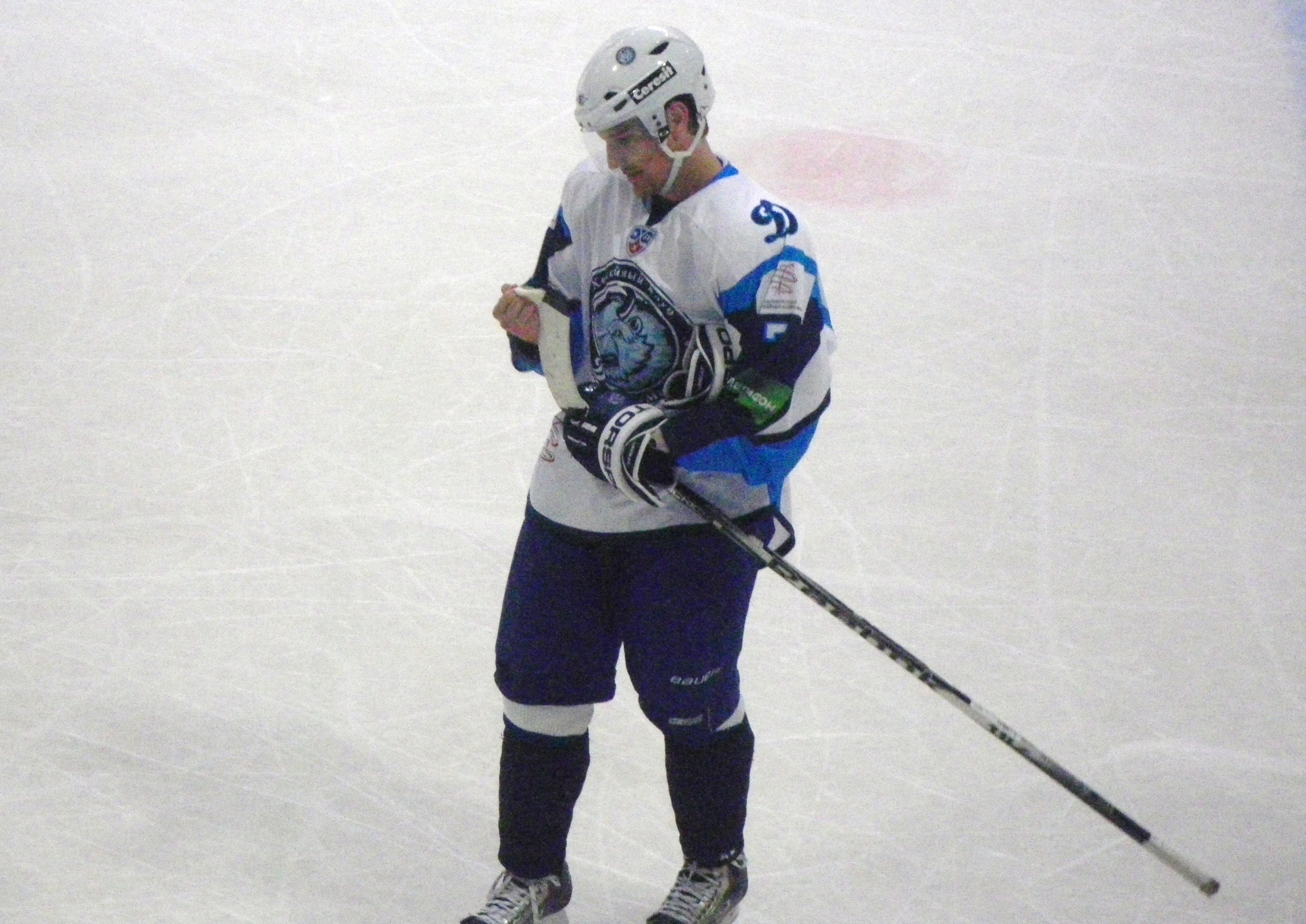
- Born: May 1, 1986 (age 40) Sherbrooke, Quebec, Canada
- Height: 6 ft 2 in (188 cm)
- Weight: 200 lb (91 kg; 14 st 4 lb)
- Position: Defence
- Shot: Left
- Played for: New Jersey Devils; HC Pustertal Wölfe; Dornbirn Bulldogs
- NHL draft: 148th overall, 2006; New Jersey Devils
- Playing career: 2006–2021

Olivier Magnan-Grenier (born May 1, 1986) is a Canadian former professional ice hockey defenceman who played in the National Hockey League (NHL) with the New Jersey Devils.

== Playing career ==
Magnan was born in Sherbrooke, Quebec. As a youth, he played in the 1999 and 2000 Quebec International Pee-Wee Hockey Tournaments with a minor ice hockey team from Sherbrooke. He was drafted by the New Jersey Devils in the 5th Round (148th overall) of the 2006 NHL entry draft, and played 18 National Hockey League games in the 2010–11 season with the Devils.

On July 10, 2012, Magnan joined newly promoted Austrian club, Dornbirner EC, from his first European club abroad in Italy with HC Pustertal Wölfe.

On September 1, 2020, having played eight seasons with Dornbirn and captaining the club, Magnan opted to return by agreeing to a one-year contract extension with the Bulldogs.

Following his ninth season with Dornbirn, and his third as captain in 2020–21, Magnan announced his retirement from professional hockey after 15 years on July 9, 2021.

== Career statistics ==
			Regular season					Playoffs
Season	Team	League	GP	G	A	Pts	PIM	GP	G	A	Pts	PIM
2001–02	Magog Cantonniers	QMAAA	42	3	9	12	50	—	—	—	—	—
2002–03	Val–d'Or Foreurs	QMJHL	2	0	0	0	0	—	—	—	—	—
2002–03	Magog Cantonniers	QMAAA	37	5	15	20	107	—	—	—	—	—
2003–04	Rouyn–Noranda Huskies	QMJHL	69	1	8	9	67	11	0	2	2	6
2004–05	Rouyn–Noranda Huskies	QMJHL	70	5	15	20	82	10	0	2	2	14
2005–06	Rouyn–Noranda Huskies	QMJHL	69	14	27	41	97	5	0	1	1	6
2006–07	Trenton Titans	ECHL	45	1	9	10	63	1	0	0	0	0
2006–07	Lowell Devils	AHL	24	1	1	2	13	—	—	—	—	—
2007–08	Lowell Devils	AHL	75	1	15	16	69	—	—	—	—	—
2008–09	Lowell Devils	AHL	76	2	8	10	66	—	—	—	—	—
2009–10	Lowell Devils	AHL	71	3	16	19	68	5	0	0	0	6
2010–11	Albany Devils	AHL	50	2	11	13	35	—	—	—	—	—
2010–11	New Jersey Devils	NHL	18	0	0	0	4	—	—	—	—	—
2011–12	HC Pustertal Wölfe	ITA	36	5	21	26	80	11	4	3	7	8
2012–13	Dornbirner EC	EBEL	54	4	8	12	68	—	—	—	—	—
2013–14	Dornbirner EC	EBEL	53	4	14	18	95	6	0	0	0	12
2014–15	Dornbirner EC	EBEL	53	3	10	13	75	—	—	—	—	—
2015–16	Dornbirner EC	EBEL	52	4	9	13	76	6	0	0	0	6
2016–17	Dornbirner EC	EBEL	48	3	11	14	47	—	—	—	—	—
2017–18	Dornbirn Bulldogs	EBEL	49	3	20	23	36	6	0	1	1	6
2018–19	Dornbirn Bulldogs	EBEL	50	3	16	19	40	—	—	—	—	—
2019–20	Dornbirn Bulldogs	EBEL	50	2	7	9	36	—	—	—	—	—
2020–21	Dornbirn Bulldogs	ICEHL	45	1	8	9	14	6	0	0	0	10
AHL totals			296	9	51	60	251	5	0	0	0	6
NHL totals			18	0	0	0	4	—	—	—	—	—
EBEL/ICEHL totals			454	27	103	130	487	24	0	1	1	34
