= Colton Yellow Horn =

Canadian ice hockey player (born 1987)

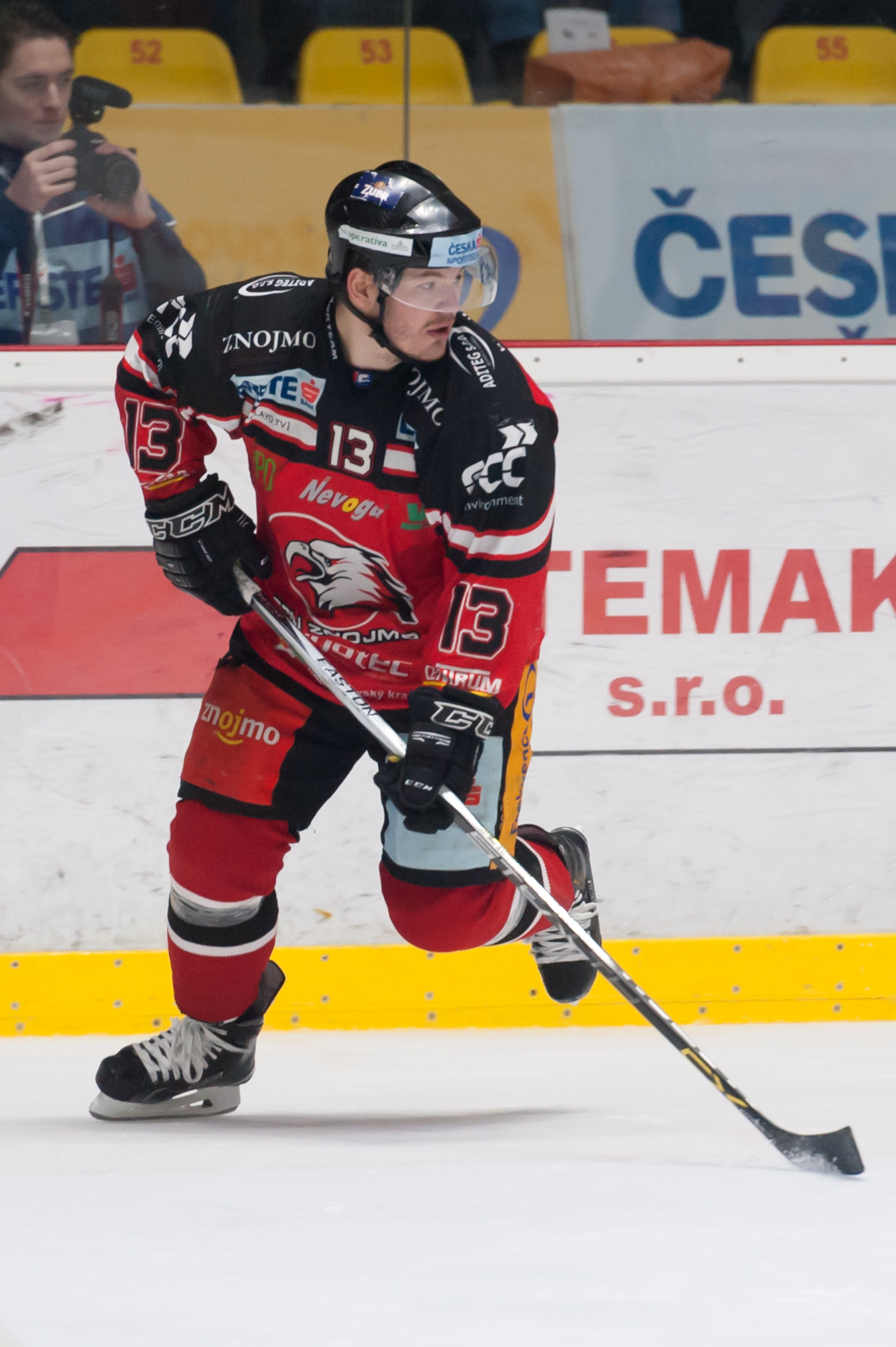
- Born: May 5, 1987 (age 39) Brocket, Alberta, Canada
- Height: 5 ft 9 in (175 cm)
- Weight: 175 lb (79 kg; 12 st 7 lb)
- Position: Left wing
- Shoots: Left
- EIHL team Former teams: Coventry Blaze; EC Red Bull Salzburg; Manchester Monarchs; Alba Volán Székesfehérvár; Nippon Paper Cranes; Orli Znojmo; Plzeň; Graz99ers; HK Nitra; HSC Csíkszereda; Glasgow Clan
- NHL draft: Undrafted
- Playing career: 2008–present

Colton Yellow Horn (born May 5, 1987) is a Canadian professional ice hockey left winger who most recently played for Coventry Blaze in the UK Elite Ice Hockey League (EIHL).

== Playing career ==
Yellow Horn played major junior beginning in 2003–04 in the Western Hockey League (WHL) with the Lethbridge Hurricanes and Tri-City Americans. In five seasons play in the league, he consistently scored beyond a point-per-game pace. In 2007–08, he tallied a league-leading 48 goals and a major junior career-high 97 points (third in league scoring) with the Americans and was named to the WHL West First All-Star Team. Despite Yellow Horn's offensive production as a junior, he went undrafted by an NHL team.

In 2008–09, Yellow Horn turned pro, going overseas to Austria to play for EC Red Bull Salzburg of the Erste Bank Eishockey Liga (EBEL). On January 28, 2009, however, he moved back to North America mid-season, signing with the Elmira Jackals of the minor league ECHL. On October 28, 2009, Yellow Horn was traded to the Stockton Thunder.

In the 2012–13 season, Yellow Horn was called up from the Ontario Reign of the ECHL to the Manchester Monarchs of the AHL on February 7, 2013. After making his long-awaited AHL debut, Yellow Horn proved his scoring prowess by contributing 18 points in just 28 games for Manchester to remain with the club for duration of the year.

On June 27, 2013, Yellow Horn decided to return abroad to the familiar Austrian Hockey League, signing a one-year deal with Hungarian club, SAPA Fehérvár AV19.

On September 3, 2014, Yellow Horn continued his journeyman career in agreeing to a one-year contract with Japanese club, Nippon Paper Cranes of the ALIH.

On June 12, 2015, Yellow Horn signed a contract with the Czech team HC Orli Znojmo of the Austrian Hockey League (EBEL). He made 53 appearances in the 2015-16 regular season, tallying 28 goals and 29 assists and also saw action in 18 playoff-contests with eight goals and 21 assists. Yellow Horn won the Ron Kennedy Trophy as the EBEL Most Valuable Player.

In April 2016, he penned a deal with HC Plzeň of the Czech Extraliga. After just 11 games in the ELH, Yellow Horn returned to previous club, Orli Znojmo, of the EBEL. In April 2018, he signed an initial one-year deal with the Graz 99ers, his fourth club of the EBEL.

After spells with HK Nitra in the Slovak Extraliga and Erste Liga side HSC Csíkszereda, Yellow Horn agreed terms with UK EIHL side Glasgow Clan for the 2021–22 season.

After a season with Glasgow, Yellow Horn agreed terms for the 2022–23 season with fellow Elite League club Coventry Blaze.

== Personal life ==
Yellow Horn grew up in the Piikani Nation tribe of Brocket, Alberta.

== Career statistics ==
=== Regular season and playoffs ===
			Regular season					Playoffs
Season	Team	League	GP	G	A	Pts	PIM	GP	G	A	Pts	PIM
2003–04	Lethbridge Hurricanes	WHL	67	5	9	14	25	—	—	—	—	—
2004–05	Lethbridge Hurricanes	WHL	70	35	51	86	40	5	1	2	3	2
2005–06	Lethbridge Hurricanes	WHL	67	25	50	75	63	6	1	5	6	6
2006–07	Tri-City Americans	WHL	59	40	37	77	57	6	1	2	3	6
2007–08	Tri-City Americans	WHL	67	48	49	97	63	16	10	11	21	18
2008–09	EC Red Bull Salzburg	EBEL	11	1	2	3	2	—	—	—	—	—
2008–09	Elmira Jackals	ECHL	24	5	6	11	10	9	0	4	4	0
2009–10	Elmira Jackals	ECHL	2	0	0	0	0	—	—	—	—	—
2009–10	Stockton Thunder	ECHL	13	2	8	10	10	—	—	—	—	—
2009–10	Allen Americans	CHL	43	10	25	35	41	20	10	10	20	20
2010–11	Allen Americans	CHL	66	33	55	88	54	13	6	10	16	24
2011–12	Allen Americans	CHL	58	24	31	55	35	6	1	4	5	6
2012–13	Ontario Reign	ECHL	48	36	22	58	28	—	—	—	—	—
2012–13	Manchester Monarchs	AHL	28	6	12	18	18	4	1	1	2	0
2013–14	Alba Volán Székesfehérvár	EBEL	43	20	23	43	36	4	0	1	1	2
2014–15	Nippon Paper Cranes	ALIH	47	21	38	59	53	—	—	—	—	—
2015–16	Orli Znojmo	EBEL	53	28	29	57	36	18	8	21	29	8
2016–17	HC Plzeň	ELH	11	4	0	4	4	—	—	—	—	—
2016–17	Orli Znojmo	EBEL	38	19	23	42	28	4	0	3	3	4
2017–18	Orli Znojmo	EBEL	50	15	24	39	22	—	—	—	—	—
2018–19	Graz 99ers	EBEL	51	24	34	58	51	10	2	4	6	2
2019–20	Graz99ers	EBEL	11	0	3	3	6	—	—	—	—	—
2019–20	HK Nitra	Slovak	32	11	23	34	14	—	—	—	—	—
2020–21	HSC Csíkszereda	EL	30	16	29	45	—	4	0	4	4	—
2020–21	HSC Csíkszereda	ROU	16	5	15	20	6	—	—	—	—	—
2021–22	Glasgow Clan	EIHL	54	11	44	55	28	2	0	1	1	6
2022–23	Coventry Blaze	EIHL	47	18	25	43	14	2	0	0	0	0
AHL totals			28	6	12	18	18	4	1	1	2	0

Medal record

Representing Canada

Ice hockey

IIHF U18 Championships
Silver medal – second place	2005 České Budějovice	

=== International ===
Year	Team	Event	Result	GP	G	A	Pts	PIM
2005	Canada	WJC18	2nd place, silver medalist(s)	6	2	0	2	0
Junior totals				6	2	0	2	0

== Awards and honours ==
Award	Year
WHL
East Second All-Star Team	2005
West Second All-Star Team	2007
West First All-Star Team	2008
ECHL
Second all-star team	2013
EBEL
Ron Kennedy Trophy (MVP)	2016
