= Andreas Nödl =

Austrian ice hockey player

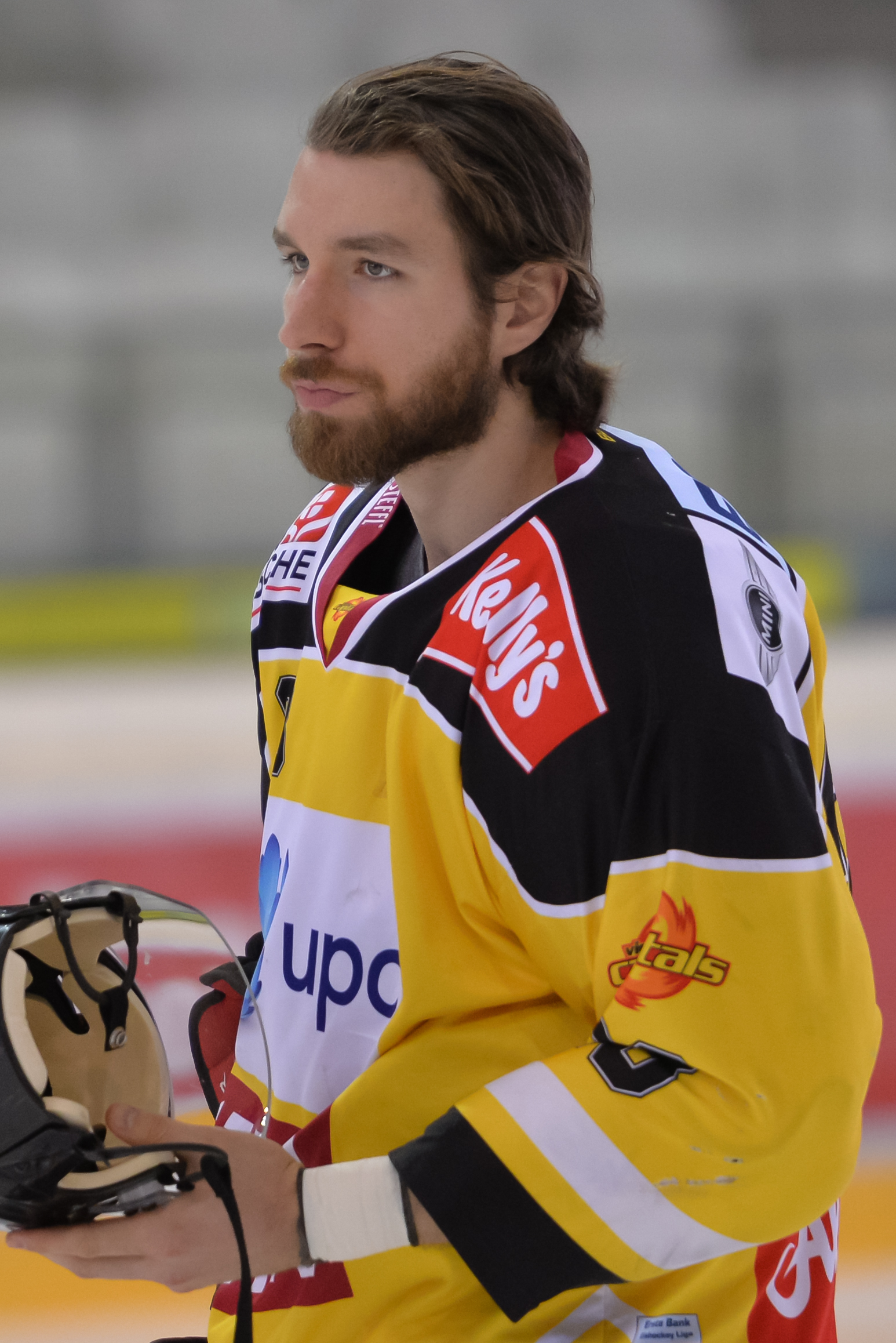
- Nödl with the Vienna Capitals in 2016
- Born: February 28, 1987 (age 39) Vienna, Austria
- Height: 6 ft 2 in (188 cm)
- Weight: 194 lb (88 kg; 13 st 12 lb)
- Position: Right wing
- Shot: Left
- Played for: Philadelphia Flyers; Carolina Hurricanes; HC TWK Innsbruck; EC KAC; EC Red Bull Salzburg; Vienna Capitals
- National team: Austria
- NHL draft: 39th overall, 2006; Philadelphia Flyers
- Playing career: 2008–2019

Andreas Nödl (born February 28, 1987) is an Austrian former professional ice hockey player. He last served as captain of the Vienna Capitals of the Austrian Hockey League (EBEL). He previously played in the National Hockey League (NHL) for the Philadelphia Flyers and Carolina Hurricanes.

== Playing career ==
As a youth, Nödl played in the 2001 Quebec International Pee-Wee Hockey Tournament with a team from Austria.

Nödl played two seasons with the Sioux Falls Stampede of the United States Hockey League (USHL) before moving on to the St. Cloud State University Huskies after being drafted in the second round, 39th overall, of the 2006 NHL entry draft by the Philadelphia Flyers. In his second season with the Stampede, he led the team with 59 points in 58 games. Coincidentally, Nödl is not the only Austrian-born player to play for the Stampede — Thomas Vanek, now of the Detroit Red Wings, spent three years with the club.

After starting the 2008–09 NHL season with the Flyers' farm team, the Philadelphia Phantoms, Nödl was called up to the NHL on October 21, 2008. On December 23, 2008, in a game against the Ottawa Senators, Nödl scored his first career NHL goal in a 6-4 victory.

On November 29, 2011, he was waived by the Flyers and picked up by the Carolina Hurricanes where he played for the rest of the season, as well as the following one.

After failing to secure an NHL contract and initially returning to Europe as a free agent, signing with HC Lausanne of the Swiss National League A, Nödl was released from his tryout contract prior to the season and would split the 2013–14 campaign in his native Austria with EC KAC and EC Red Bull Salzburg.

On October 16, 2014, Nödl belatedly signed on as a free agent with fellow EBEL club, the Vienna Capitals. He served as captain of the team for both the 2017–18 season and 2018–19 season.

== International play ==
In 2009, Nödl represented Austria in the IIHF's World Championship in Switzerland.

== Career statistics ==
=== Regular season and playoffs ===
			Regular season					Playoffs
Season	Team	League	GP	G	A	Pts	PIM	GP	G	A	Pts	PIM
2001–02	Wiener EV	AUT U20	1	0	0	0	0	—	—	—	—	—
2003–04	Wiener EV	AUT U20	15	11	10	21	47	—	—	—	—	—
2003–04	Wiener EV	AUT.2	25	15	22	37	26	—	—	—	—	—
2004–05	Sioux Falls Stampede	USHL	44	7	9	16	24	—	—	—	—	—
2005–06	Sioux Falls Stampede	USHL	58	29	30	59	16	14	6	9	15	6
2006–07	St. Cloud State University	NCHC	40	18	28	46	32	—	—	—	—	—
2007–08	St. Cloud State University	NCHC	40	18	26	44	22	—	—	—	—	—
2007–08	Philadelphia Phantoms	AHL	3	1	0	1	0	10	1	0	1	2
2008–09	Philadelphia Phantoms	AHL	39	6	14	20	20	4	0	1	1	2
2008–09	Philadelphia Flyers	NHL	38	1	3	4	2	—	—	—	—	—
2009–10	Adirondack Phantoms	AHL	65	14	20	34	24	—	—	—	—	—
2009–10	Philadelphia Flyers	NHL	10	0	1	1	0	10	0	0	0	0
2010–11	Philadelphia Flyers	NHL	67	11	11	22	16	2	0	0	0	0
2011–12	Philadelphia Flyers	NHL	12	0	1	1	2	—	—	—	—	—
2011–12	Carolina Hurricanes	NHL	48	3	4	7	6	—	—	—	—	—
2012–13	HC TWK Innsbruck	EBEL	17	4	11	15	26	—	—	—	—	—
2012–13	Charlotte Checkers	AHL	6	1	4	5	0	—	—	—	—	—
2012–13	Carolina Hurricanes	NHL	8	0	1	1	2	—	—	—	—	—
2013–14	EC KAC	EBEL	6	0	4	4	2	—	—	—	—	—
2013–14	EC Red Bull Salzburg	EBEL	31	8	6	14	18	—	—	—	—	—
2014–15	Vienna Capitals	EBEL	42	10	12	22	38	15	2	3	5	24
2015–16	Vienna Capitals	EBEL	54	14	15	29	61	5	1	1	2	6
2016–17	Vienna Capitals	EBEL	54	12	19	31	20	12	2	3	5	0
2017–18	Vienna Capitals	EBEL	53	10	15	25	16	11	6	1	7	8
2018–19	Vienna Capitals	EBEL	47	13	17	30	8	18	1	2	3	6
AHL totals			113	22	38	60	44	14	1	1	2	4
NHL totals			183	15	21	36	28	12	0	0	0	0
EBEL totals			304	71	99	170	189	75	13	12	25	50

=== International ===
Year	Team	Event	Result	GP	G	A	Pts	PIM
2003	Austria	WJC18 D1	19th	5	2	2	4	4
2004	Austria	WJC18 D1	15th	5	2	3	5	26
2004	Austria	WJC	9th	6	0	0	0	0
2005	Austria	WJC18 D1	19th	4	1	1	2	16
2005	Austria	WJC D1	14th	5	2	2	4	39
2009	Austria	WC	14th	4	0	1	1	4
2014	Austria	OG	10th	4	0	0	0	0
Junior totals				25	7	8	15	85
Senior totals				8	0	1	1	4

== Awards and honours ==
Award	Year
College
All-WCHA Rookie Team	2007
All-WCHA Third Team	2007
All-WCHA Second Team	2008
Philadelphia Flyers
Pelle Lindbergh Memorial Trophy	2011

Awards and achievements
Preceded by Phil Kessel	WCHA Rookie of the Year; 2006–07	Succeeded by Richard Bachman
Preceded by Award Created	NCAA Rookie of the Year; 2006–07	Succeeded by Richard Bachman
