= Thomas Koch (ice hockey) =

Austrian ice hockey player

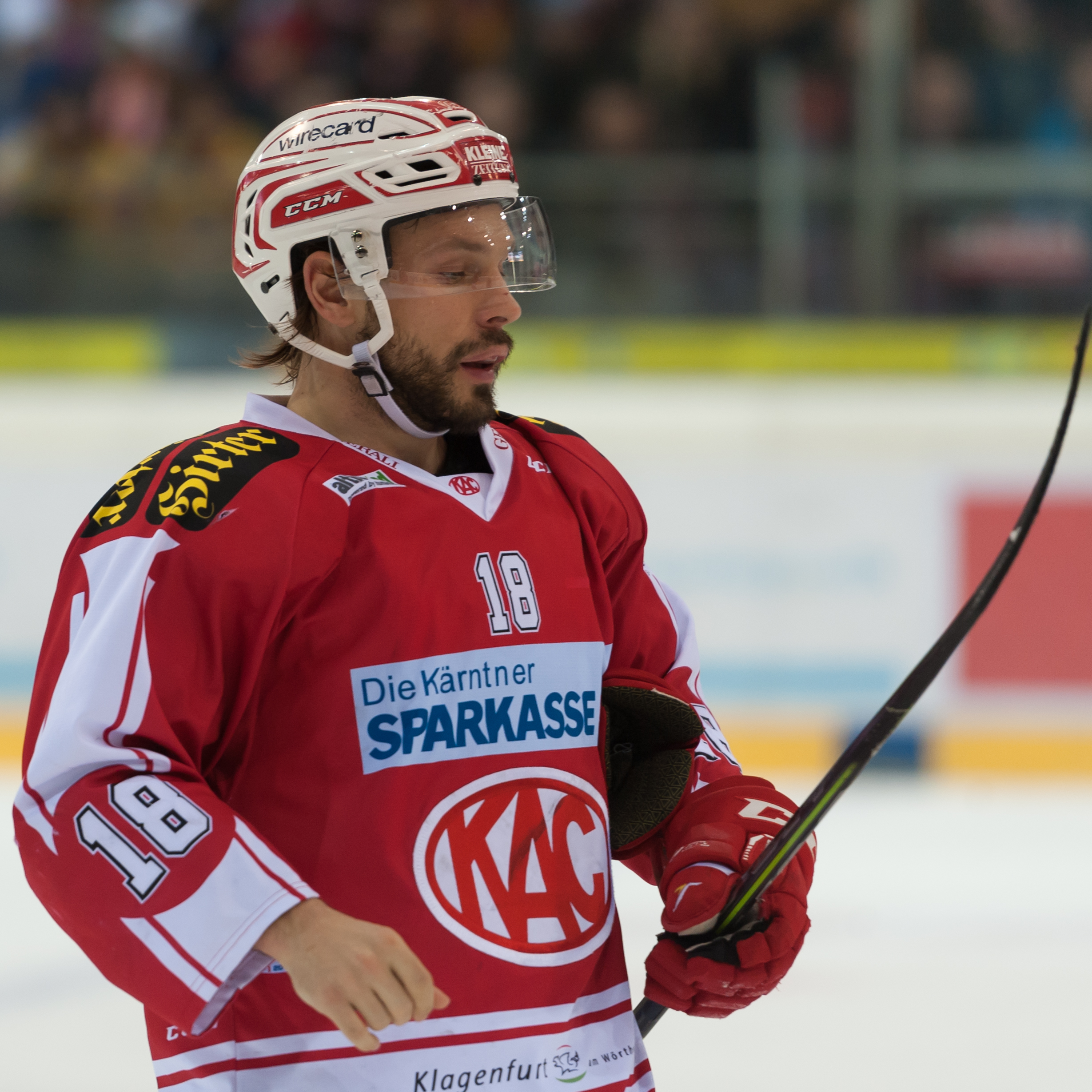
- Koch in 2016
- Born: August 17, 1983 (age 41); Klagenfurt, Austria
- Height: 5 ft 8 in (173 cm)
- Weight: 174 lb (79 kg; 12 st 6 lb)
- Position: Forward
- Shoots: Left
- ICEHL team Former teams: EC KAC; Luleå HF; EC Red Bull Salzburg
- National team: Austria
- Playing career: 1999–present

Thomas Koch (born August 17, 1983) is an Austrian professional ice hockey player. He is currently playing with EC KAC in the ICE Hockey League (ICEHL). He re-joined for his second tenure with Klagenfurt after captaining EC Red Bull Salzburg on April 16, 2011.

Koch played in the 2011 IIHF World Championship as a member of the Austria men's national ice hockey team.

== Career statistics ==
=== Regular season and playoffs ===
			Regular season					Playoffs
Season	Team	League	GP	G	A	Pts	PIM	GP	G	A	Pts	PIM
1999–2000	EC KAC	IEHL	13	1	0	1	2	—	—	—	—	—
1999–2000	EC KAC	EBEL	11	0	0	0	0	—	—	—	—	—
1999–2000	Team Kärnten 2006	AUT.2	17	9	3	12	12	—	—	—	—	—
2000–01	EC KAC	EBEL	49	15	34	49	52	—	—	—	—	—
2001–02	EC KAC	AUT U20	1	0	1	1	0	—	—	—	—	—
2001–02	EC KAC	EBEL	32	12	11	23	40	11	5	3	8	8
2002–03	EC KAC	EBEL	42	17	25	42	26	6	1	7	8	2
2003–04	EC KAC	EBEL	47	22	29	51	34	8	2	5	7	4
2004–05	Luleå HF	SEL	50	9	8	17	22	4	1	0	1	0
2005–06	Luleå HF	SEL	50	7	9	16	34	6	0	2	2	4
2006–07	EC Red Bull Salzburg	EBEL	54	30	46	76	72	8	5	6	11	10
2007–08	EC Red Bull Salzburg	EBEL	46	10	33	43	40	14	6	10	16	4
2008–09	EC Red Bull Salzburg	EBEL	52	20	38	58	34	16	8	11	19	20
2009–10	EC Red Bull Salzburg	EBEL	50	19	43	62	24	18	5	11	16	6
2010–11	EC Red Bull Salzburg	EBEL	49	23	34	57	34	18	5	9	14	16
2011–12	EC KAC	EBEL	48	7	23	30	30	15	3	5	8	10
2012–13	EC KAC	EBEL	44	13	38	51	24	14	4	5	9	12
2013–14	EC KAC	EBEL	47	17	20	36	30	—	—	—	—	—
2014–15	EC KAC	EBEL	54	11	21	32	34	9	3	7	10	12
2015–16	EC KAC	EBEL	50	10	29	39	24	4	1	4	5	2
2016–17	EC KAC	EBEL	51	11	30	41	34	14	3	10	13	6
2017–18	EC KAC	EBEL	53	15	21	36	20	6	0	0	0	2
2018–19	EC KAC	EBEL	54	13	27	40	26	15	3	11	14	12
2019–20	EC KAC	EBEL	48	12	16	28	26	3	1	1	2	6
2020–21	EC KAC	ICEHL	48	11	28	39	18	15	1	11	12	6
2021–22	EC KAC	ICEHL	28	10	10	20	10	9	3	5	8	2
AUT totals			957	297	556	853	632	203	59	121	180	140
SEL totals			100	16	17	33	56	10	1	2	3	4

=== International ===
Year	Team	Event	GP	G	A	Pts	PIM
2000	Austria	WJC C	4	4	2	6	2
2000	Austria	WJC18 B	5	2	5	7	6
2001	Austria	WJC D1	5	2	4	6	4
2002	Austria	WJC D1	5	5	3	8	33
2003	Austria	WJC D1	5	2	6	8	4
2003	Austria	WC	6	0	0	0	0
2004	Austria	WC	6	1	1	2	4
2005	Austria	OGQ	3	3	0	3	0
2006	Austria	WC D1	5	5	5	10	2
2007	Austria	WC	6	2	2	4	0
2008	Austria	WC D1	5	2	7	9	2
2009	Austria	OGQ	3	1	0	1	2
2009	Austria	WC	6	4	3	7	10
2010	Austria	WC D1	5	5	4	9	0
2011	Austria	WC	6	0	2	2	2
2012	Austria	WC D1A	5	1	1	2	2
2013	Austria	OGQ	3	2	2	4	2
2013	Austria	WC	6	0	0	0	2
2014	Austria	OG	4	0	0	0	0
2014	Austria	WC D1A	5	0	10	10	4
Junior totals			24	15	20	35	49
Senior totals			74	26	37	63	32
