= Riley Holzapfel =

Canadian ice hockey player (born 1988)

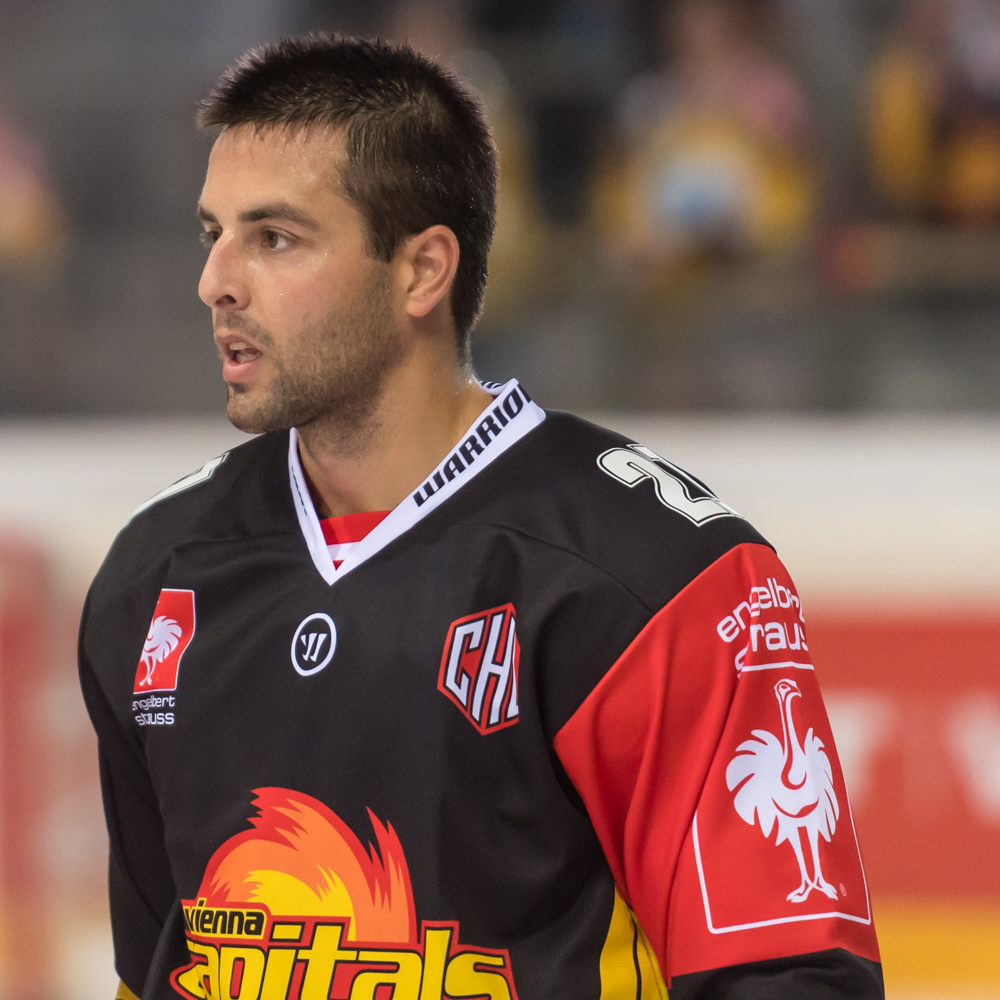
- Born: August 18, 1988 (age 37) Regina, Saskatchewan, Canada
- Height: 6 ft 0 in (183 cm)
- Weight: 185 lb (84 kg; 13 st 3 lb)
- Position: Centre
- Shot: Left
- EBEL team Former teams: Vienna Capitals; Chicago Wolves; St. John's IceCaps; Syracuse Crunch; Wilkes-Barre/Scranton Penguins; HV71; Karlskrona HK
- NHL draft: 43rd overall, 2006; Atlanta Thrashers
- Playing career: 2008–2020

Riley Holzapfel (born August 18, 1988) is a Canadian former professional ice hockey player.

== Playing career ==
Holzapfel played major junior hockey for the Moose Jaw Warriors of the Western Hockey League (WHL). He was drafted by the Atlanta Thrashers at the 2006 NHL entry draft, chosen 43rd overall. On September 6, 2007, Riley signed a three-year entry-level contract with the Thrashers. In 2008, he played for Canada in the IIHF World U20 Championship where Canada went on to win gold in a 3-2 victory over Sweden.

On February 13, 2012, Holzapfel was traded by the Winnipeg Jets to the Anaheim Ducks in exchange for Maxime Macenauer. He was then immediately assigned to Ducks AHL affiliate, the Syracuse Crunch.

He signed a one-year, two-way contract as a free agent with the Pittsburgh Penguins on July 1, 2012, but spent the season in AHL with Wilkes-Barre/Scranton Penguins. In July 2013, he signed a two-year deal with the Swedish Hockey League club HV71.

After a further third season in Sweden with newly promoted Karlskrona HK in 2015–16 season, Holzapfel left as a free agent to sign a one-year deal with Austrian club, the Vienna Capitals of the EBEL on July 20, 2016. After leading the Capitals with 53 points in 54 games in the 2016–17 season, and contributing with 23 points in just 12 post-season games, he received the Ron Kennedy Trophy as the league's Most Valuable Player.

== Career statistics ==
=== Regular season and playoffs ===
			Regular season					Playoffs
Season	Team	League	GP	G	A	Pts	PIM	GP	G	A	Pts	PIM
2004–05	Moose Jaw Warriors	WHL	63	15	13	28	32	5	1	2	3	8
2005–06	Moose Jaw Warriors	WHL	64	19	38	57	46	22	7	9	16	20
2006–07	Moose Jaw Warriors	WHL	72	39	43	82	94	—	—	—	—	—
2007–08	Moose Jaw Warriors	WHL	49	18	23	41	43	6	3	5	8	12
2007–08	Chicago Wolves	AHL	1	0	0	0	0	—	—	—	—	—
2008–09	Chicago Wolves	AHL	73	13	19	32	38	—	—	—	—	—
2009–10	Chicago Wolves	AHL	60	7	16	23	30	14	0	3	3	6
2010–11	Chicago Wolves	AHL	68	12	15	27	20	—	—	—	—	—
2011–12	St. John's Ice Caps	AHL	29	8	7	15	8	—	—	—	—	—
2011–12	Syracuse Crunch	AHL	28	8	14	22	34	4	0	1	1	4
2012–13	Wilkes–Barre/Scranton Penguins	AHL	76	21	30	51	93	15	4	6	10	8
2013–14	HV71	SHL	48	10	12	22	49	4	0	0	0	0
2014–15	HV71	SHL	49	7	6	13	14	6	0	0	0	0
2015–16	Karlskrona HK	SHL	48	9	16	25	24	—	—	—	—	—
2016–17	Vienna Capitals	AUT	54	22	31	53	20	12	12	11	23	8
2017–18	Vienna Capitals	AUT	53	21	26	47	20	2	1	2	3	0
2018–19	Vienna Capitals	AUT	53	19	34	53	24	18	3	6	9	10
2019–20	Vienna Capitals	AUT	48	18	28	46	18	3	2	0	2	0
AHL totals			335	69	101	170	223	33	4	10	14	18
AUT totals			208	80	119	199	82	35	18	19	37	18

Medal record

Representing Canada

Ice hockey

World Junior Championships
Gold medal – first place	2008 Pardubice	

=== International ===
Year	Team	Event	Result	GP	G	A	Pts	PIM
2008	Canada	WJC	1st place, gold medalist(s)	7	0	0	0	8
Junior totals				7	0	0	0	8

== Awards and honours ==
Award	Year
WHL
CHL Top Prospects Game	2006
East First All-Star Team	2007
EBEL
Ron Kennedy Trophy (MVP)	2017
