= Ron Kennedy Trophy =

- Sport: Ice hockey
- Awarded for: Most Valuable Player in Austrian Hockey League

History
- First award: 2009
- Most recent: Peter Schneider

The Ron Kennedy Trophy is awarded to the "player judged most valuable to his team" in the Austrian Hockey League (EBEL). The trophy has been known as the Ron Kennedy Trophy since the 2009–10 Austrian Hockey League season. The trophy is named after Ron Kennedy, who died at 9 July 2009 from cancer. Kennedy played in the Austrian League in the 80's, and was head coach of the Austrian National Team and several teams in the Austrian League.

== List of winners ==
Season	Winner	Team	Position
2008–09	Thomas Koch	EC KAC	C
2009–10	Alex Westlund	EHC Linz	G
2010–11	Benoit Gratton	Vienna Capitals	C
2011–12	John Hughes	EC Red Bull Salzburg	C
2012–13	Jamie Lundmark	EC KAC	C
2013–14	Derek Ryan	EC VSV	C
2014–15	Brian Lebler	EHC Linz	RW
2015–16	Colton Yellow Horn	Orli Znojmo	LW
2016–17	Riley Holzapfel	Vienna Capitals	C
2017–18	Rafael Rotter	Vienna Capitals	RW
2018–19	Peter Schneider	Vienna Capitals	RW
