= Peter Schneider (ice hockey) =

Austrian ice hockey player

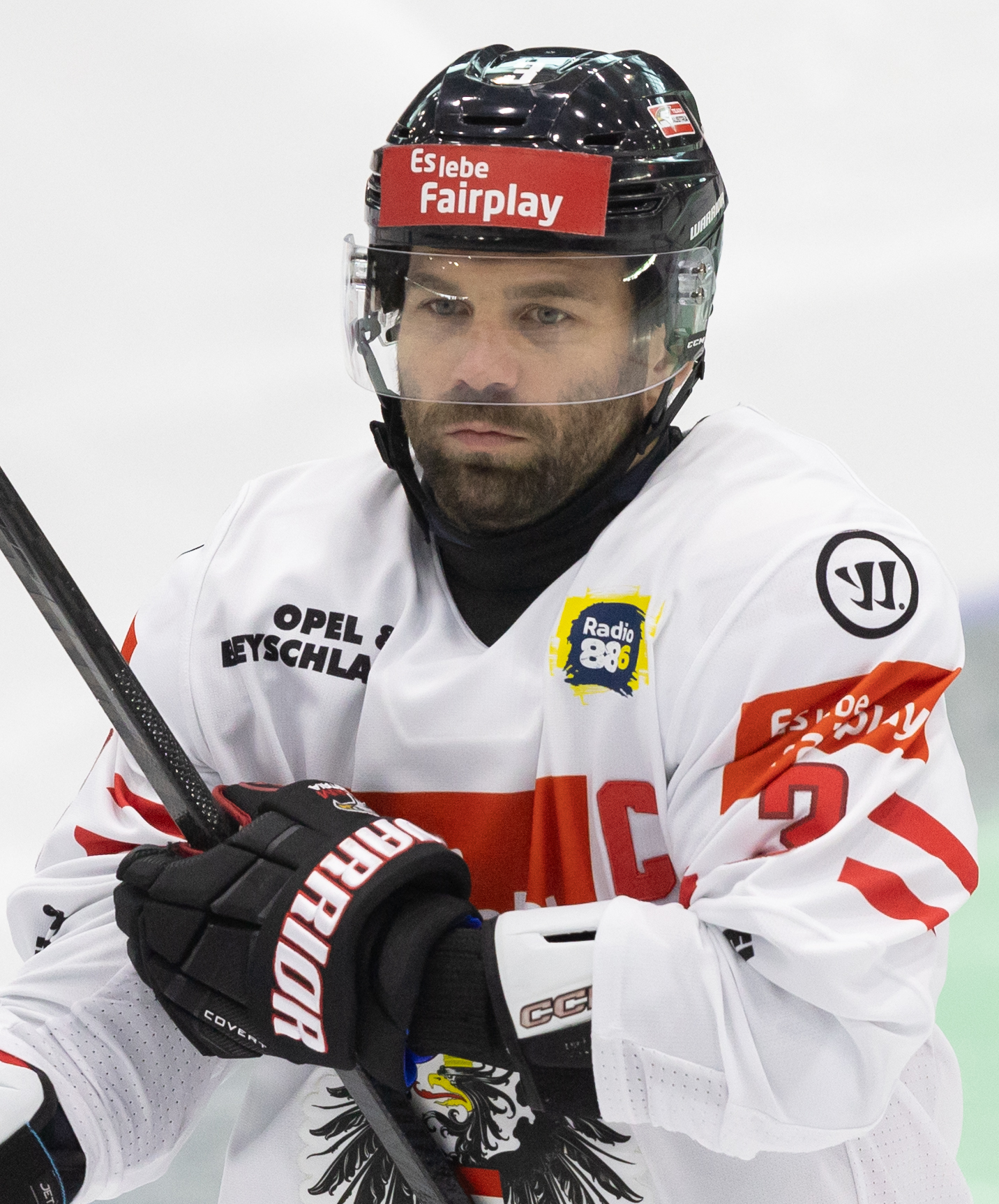
- Schneider with Austria in 2026
- Born: 4 April 1991 (age 35) Klosterneuburg, Austria
- Height: 6 ft 0 in (183 cm)
- Weight: 201 lb (91 kg; 14 st 5 lb)
- Position: Winger
- Shoots: Right
- ICEHL team Former teams: EC Red Bull Salzburg; Indy Fuel; Florida Everblades; Kalamazoo Wings; Vienna Capitals; EHC Biel; HC Kometa Brno
- National team: Austria
- NHL draft: Undrafted
- Playing career: 2015–present

Peter Schneider (born 4 April 1991) is an Austrian professional ice hockey player who is a winger for EC Red Bull Salzburg of the ICE Hockey League (ICEHL).

== Playing career ==
Undrafted, Schneider previously played with the Vienna Capitals of the Austrian Hockey League after spending the first three seasons of his professional career in the ECHL.

On May 2, 2019, Schneider left the Capitals and the EBEL after a dominant season, securing a one-year contract with Swiss NL club, EHC Biel.

== Career statistics ==
=== Regular season and playoffs ===
			Regular season					Playoffs
Season	Team	League	GP	G	A	Pts	PIM	GP	G	A	Pts	PIM
2007–08	HC Mountfield U18	Czech U18	36	11	8	19	12	2	0	0	0	2
2007–08	HC Cesky Krumlov U18	Czech U18	3	4	16	20	4	—	—	—	—	—
2008–09	HC Mountfield U20	Czech U20	20	3	2	5	6	—	—	—	—	—
2008–09	HC Znojemsti Orli U20	Czech U20	22	16	5	21	12	2	0	1	1	0
2009–10	HC Slovan Bratislava U20	Slovak U20	9	1	2	3	0	—	—	—	—	—
2009–10	Orli Znojmo U20	Czech U20	29	17	13	30	26	—	—	—	—	—
2010–11	Indiana Ice	USHL	55	30	23	53	49	5	1	2	3	4
2011–12	University of Notre Dame	NCAA	23	2	4	6	6	—	—	—	—	—
2012–13	University of Notre Dame	NCAA	35	5	4	9	20	—	—	—	—	—
2013–14	University of Notre Dame	NCAA	39	8	8	16	12	—	—	—	—	—
2014–15	University of Notre Dame	NCAA	41	7	9	16	38	—	—	—	—	—
2014–15	Indy Fuel	ECHL	10	4	4	8	11	—	—	—	—	—
2015–16	Indy Fuel	ECHL	64	16	21	37	33	—	—	—	—	—
2016–17	Florida Everblades	ECHL	10	1	4	5	7	—	—	—	—	—
2016–17	Kalamazoo Wings	ECHL	51	20	30	50	33	7	5	4	9	2
2017–18	Kalamazoo Wings	ECHL	5	0	7	7	12	—	—	—	—	—
2017–18	Vienna Capitals	EBEL	38	14	13	27	18	11	1	8	9	8
2018–19	Vienna Capitals	EBEL	54	35	34	69	34	18	5	7	12	14
2019–20	EHC Biel-Bienne	NL	38	12	11	23	18	—	—	—	—	—
2020–21	HC Kometa Brno	ELH	43	20	6	26	16	8	1	0	1	2
2021–22	EC Red Bull Salzburg	ICEHL	45	28	24	52	6	12	4	8	12	2
2022–23	EC Red Bull Salzburg	ICEHL	46	16	26	42	10	16	9	2	11	0
2023–24	EC Red Bull Salzburg	ICEHL	39	17	23	40	2	11	2	8	10	4
2024–25	EC Red Bull Salzburg	ICEHL	40	19	26	45	18	13	7	10	17	6
2025–26	EC Red Bull Salzburg	ICEHL	43	9	18	27	16	4	1	0	1	2
ECHL totals			140	41	66	107	96	7	5	4	9	2
ICEHL (EBEL) totals			305	138	164	302	104	85	29	43	72	36

=== International ===
Year	Team	Event	GP	G	A	Pts	PIM
2009	Austria U18	WJC-18 (D1)	5	4	0	4	2
2010	Austria U20	WJC-20	6	0	1	1	4
2011	Austria U20	WJC-20 (D1)	5	1	3	4	0
2018	Austria	WC	7	1	1	2	0
2019	Austria	WC	6	1	2	3	4
2021	Austria	OGQ	3	0	1	1	0
2022	Austria	WC	7	3	6	9	4
2023	Austria	WC	7	1	4	5	0
2024	Austria	WC	7	4	2	6	2
2024	Austria	OGQ	3	0	0	0	0
2025	Austria	WC	8	2	5	7	4
2026	Austria	WC	7	2	4	6	8
Junior totals			16	5	4	9	6
Senior totals			55	14	25	39	22

== Awards and honours ==
Award	Year
EBEL
Ron Kennedy Trophy (MVP)	2019
