= 2016–17 Austrian Hockey League season =

2016–17 Erste Bank Eishockey Liga
- League: Erste Bank Eishockey Liga
- Sport: Ice hockey
- Duration: 15 September 2016 – 7 April 2017
- Teams: 12

Regular season
- Season champions: Vienna Capitals
- Season MVP: Riley Holzapfel
- Top scorer: Corey Locke
- Finals champions: Vienna Capitals
- Runners-up: EC KAC

Austrian Hockey League seasons
- 2015–16 season 2017–18 season

The 2016–17 Austrian Hockey League season began on 15 September 2016 and ended on 7 April 2017. The defending champion was EC Red Bull Salzburg. On April 7, the Vienna Capitals won the Austrian Hockey Championship for the 2nd time in their history.

== Teams ==
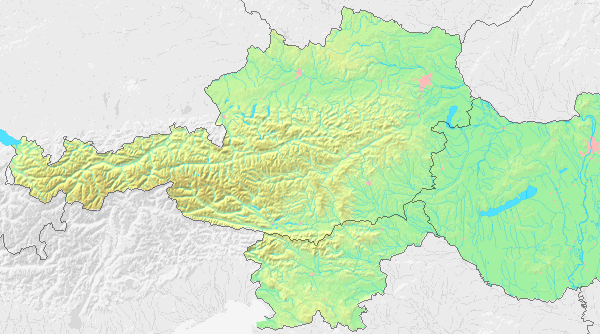
Teams participating in the Erste Bank Eishockey League in 2016-17

Team	City	Arena	Capacity
Dornbirner EC	(Austria) Dornbirn	Messestadion Dornbirn	4,270
Moser Medical Graz 99ers	(Austria) Graz	Merkur-Eisarena	4,126
HC TWK Innsbruck	(Austria) Innsbruck	Tyrolean Ice Arena	3,000
EC KAC	(Austria) Klagenfurt	Stadthalle Klagenfurt	4,945
EHC LIWEST Black Wings Linz	(Austria) Linz	Keine Sorgen EisArena	4,863
EC Red Bull Salzburg	(Austria) Salzburg	Eisarena Salzburg	3,200
UPC Vienna Capitals	(Austria) Vienna	Albert Schultz Eishalle	7,022
EC Villacher SV	(Austria) Villach	Stadthalle Villach	4,500
HC Orli Znojmo	(Czech Republic) Znojmo	Hostan Arena	4,800
SAPA Fehérvár AV19	(Hungary) Székesfehérvár	Ifjabb Ocskay Gábor Ice Hall	3,500
HC Bolzano	(Italy) Bolzano	Eiswelle	7,200
HDD Olimpija Ljubljana	(Slovenia) Ljubljana	Tivoli Hall	4,000

== Standings ==
=== Regular season ===
Rank	Team	GP	W	L	OTW	OTL	Goals	Diff.	Pts
1	Vienna Capitals	44	27	6	6	5	151:95	+56	98
2	EC Red Bull Salzburg	44	22	9	8	5	158:111	+47	87
3	EHC Liwest Linz	44	23	10	6	5	168:127	+41	86
4	HC Bolzano	44	22	13	3	6	137:118	+19	78
5	HC TWK Innsbruck	44	18	17	3	6	148:152	-4	66
6	EC KAC	44	18	18	4	4	128:123	+5	66
7	EC VSV	44	15	18	6	5	136:133	+3	62
8	Graz 99ers	44	18	21	2	3	124:114	+10	61
9	Orli Znojmo	44	15	21	5	3	109:128	-19	58
10	Dornbirner EC	44	15	21	0	8	120:143	-23	53
11	Fehérvár AV19	44	11	21	8	4	119:151	-32	53
12	HDD Olimpija Ljubljana	44	2	32	6	3	85:188	-103	24

=== Placement round ===
Rank	Team	GP	W	L	OTW	OTL	Goals	Diff.	Pts (Bonus)
1	Vienna Capitals	10	6	3	0	1	30:24	+6	25 (6)
2	EC Red Bull Salzburg	10	6	2	1	1	46:31	+15	25 (4)
3	EC KAC	10	7	2	1	0	41:19	+22	23 (0)
4	EHC Black Wings Linz	10	4	6	0	0	29:36	-7	14 (2)
5	HC TWK Innsbruck	10	3	7	0	0	31:45	-14	9 (0)
6	HC Bolzano	10	2	8	0	0	28:50	-22	7 (1)

=== Qualification round ===
Rank	Team	GP	W	L	OTW	OTL	Goals	Diff.	Pts (Bonus)
1	Graz 99ers	10	7	3	0	0	32:21	+11	25 (4)
2	Orli Znojmo	10	7	3	0	0	36:24	+12	23 (2)
3	Dornbirner EC	10	5	3	1	1	32:23	+9	19 (1)
4	EC VSV	10	3	6	1	0	35:37	-2	17 (6)
5	HDD Olimpija Ljubljana	10	2	5	2	1	21:39	-18	11 (0)
6	Fehérvár AV19	10	2	6	0	2	26:38	-12	8 (0)

== Playoffs ==
Quarterfinals
P1	Vienna Capitals	4
P5	HC TWK Innsbruck	0
P4	EHC Liwest Linz	1
P6	HC Bolzano	4
P2	EC Red Bull Salzburg	4
Q1	Graz 99ers	1
Q2	Orli Znojmo	0
P3	EC KAC	4

Semifinals
P1	Vienna Capitals	4
P6	HC Bolzano	0
P2	EC Red Bull Salzburg	2
P3	EC KAC	4

Finals
P1	Vienna Capitals	4
P3	EC KAC	0
