= Richard Bachman (ice hockey) =

American ice hockey player (born 1987)

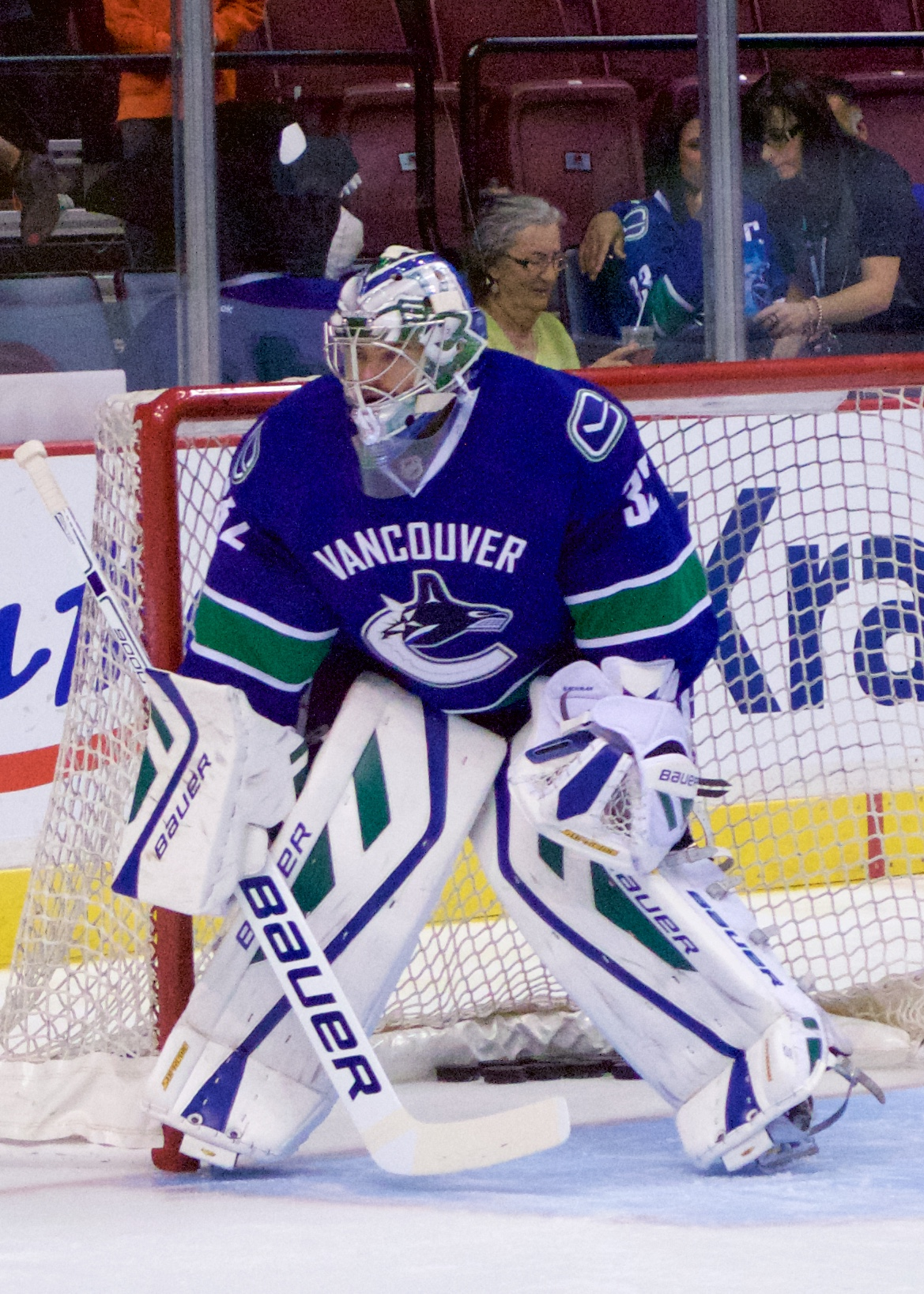
- Bachman with the Vancouver Canucks in 2015
- Born: July 25, 1987 (age 39) Salt Lake City, Utah, U.S.
- Height: 5 ft 10 in (178 cm)
- Weight: 196 lb (89 kg; 14 st 0 lb)
- Position: Goaltender
- Caught: Left
- Played for: Dallas Stars; Edmonton Oilers; Vancouver Canucks; IK Oskarshamn
- National team: United States
- NHL draft: 120th overall, 2006; Dallas Stars
- Playing career: 2009–2020

Richard Harrison Bachman (born July 25, 1987) is an American former professional ice hockey goaltender who is currently the goaltending coach for the Iowa Wild of the American Hockey League (AHL). He played two seasons of college ice hockey at Colorado College before enjoying a career in the National Hockey League with the Dallas Stars, Edmonton Oilers and the Vancouver Canucks. Bachman was born in Salt Lake City, Utah, but grew up in Highlands Ranch, Colorado.

== Playing career ==
=== Early career ===
As a youth, Bachman played in the 2001 Quebec International Pee-Wee Hockey Tournament with the Colorado Junior Avalanche minor ice hockey team from Littleton, Colorado.

During his time at Cushing Academy, Bachman compiled a GAA of 1.28 with 3 shutouts in 28 games He also split this time independently with the Boston Jr. Bruins. While at the Cedar Rapids RoughRiders of the United States Hockey League after a trade from the Chicago Steel, Bachman compiled a .913 save percentage in 26 regular-season starts. Bachman was chosen in the fourth round, 120th overall in the 2006 NHL entry draft by the Dallas Stars.

=== Colorado College ===
During his freshman year, Bachman became the second player in WCHA history to be named Player and Rookie of the Year in the same season.

As a sophomore in the 2008–09 season, Bachman posted a .914 save percentage with a 2.63 GAA.

=== Dallas Stars ===
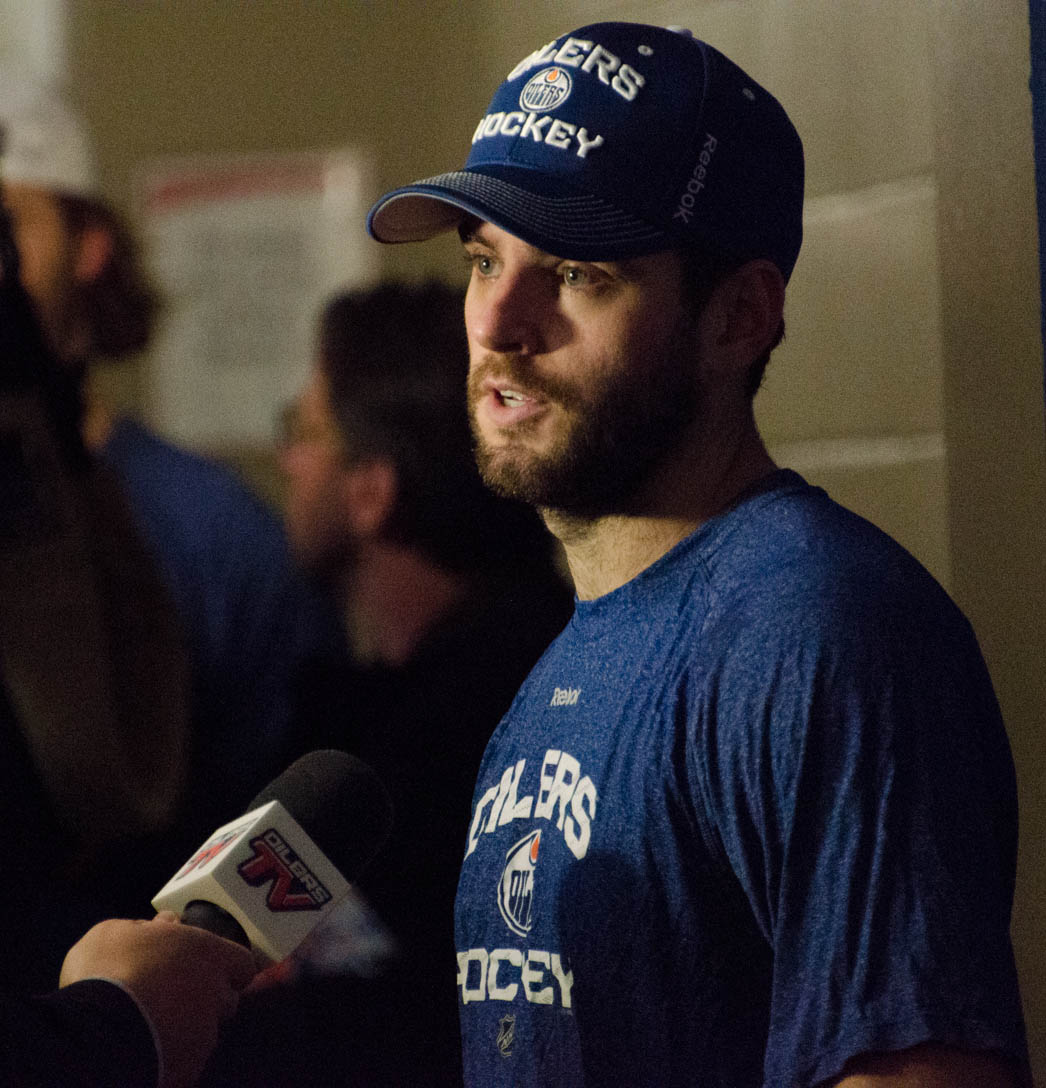
Bachman with the Oilers in 2014

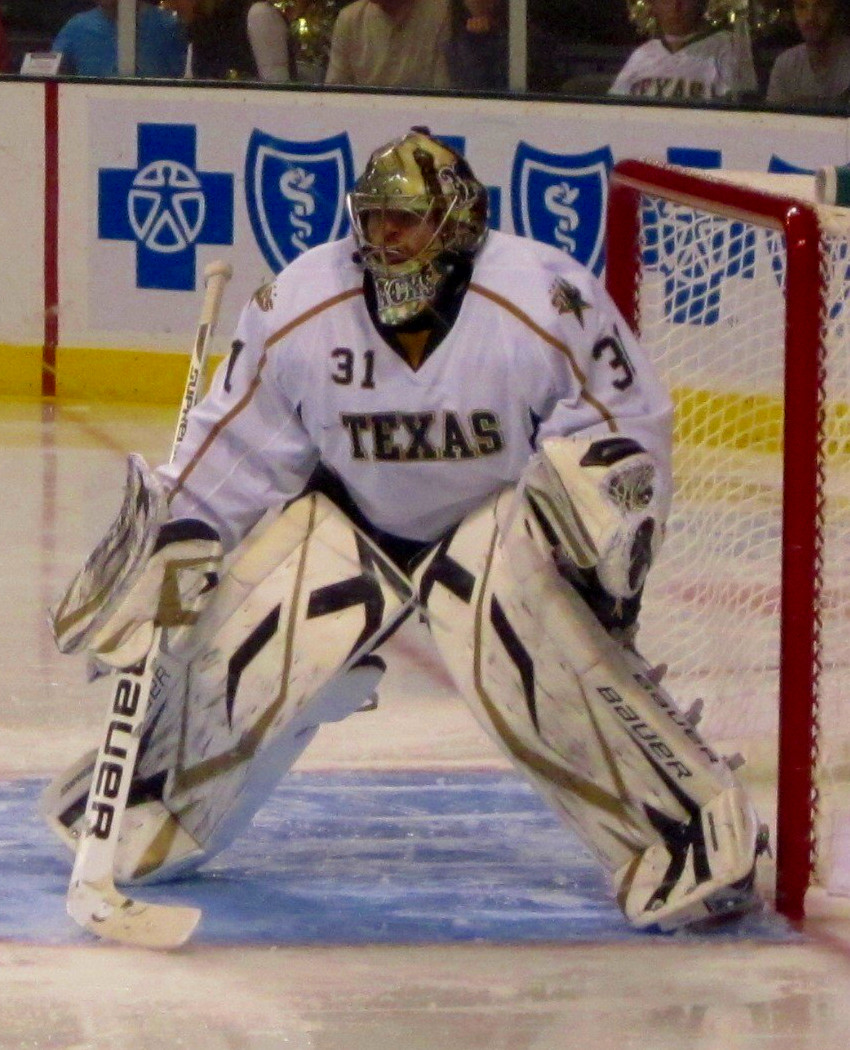
Bachman playing for the Texas Stars in 2011

On March 27, 2009, Bachman signed a three-year entry-level contract with the Dallas Stars, ending his college career. After spending his first professional season with American Hockey League affiliate the Texas Stars, Bachman was called up to Dallas in the following 2010–11 season on December 8, 2011. Bachman was called to back up Andrew Raycroft after the Stars' primary goalie, Kari Lehtonen, was placed on the Injury Reserve. He then made his debut with the Stars that day. With the Stars, Bachman started a trend for his goalie masks to have a theme of The Shining, acknowledging that "Richard Bachman" was also a pen name for Shining author Stephen King.

After he was initially reassigned to the Texas Stars to begin the 2011–12 season, Bachman was recalled a month into the season and replaced Andrew Raycroft as the primary backup to Kari Lehtonen. On December 13, 2011, Bachman earned his first NHL shutout, blanking the New York Rangers 1–0.

=== Edmonton Oilers ===
On July 6, 2013, Bachman signed a one-year deal with the Edmonton Oilers after becoming a free agent. Bachman competed with Jason LaBarbera for the backup goaltender position behind Devan Dubnyk. On October 27, Bachman had his first start with the Edmonton Oilers, making 47 saves but losing in a shootout to the Los Angeles Kings. In the 2013-14 NHL season Bachman suffered a hamstring injury and was eventually sent down to Oklahoma City, where he would play for the remainder of the season.

=== Vancouver Canucks ===
On July 1, 2015, Bachman signed as a free agent to a two-year contract with the Vancouver Canucks. Relegated to third goalie, Bachman only played one game for the Canucks and spent most of the season in the AHL, playing for the Utica Comets; the following season was spent entirely with the Comets.

On July 13, 2016, Bachman signed a contract extension to stay with Vancouver through 2018. On June 20, 2018, Bachman signed a two-year, two-way contract to remain with the Canucks organization through 2020.

While playing with Utica, Bachman suffered an Achilles injury which prematurely ended his 2018–19 AHL season on December 21, 2018.

In the following 2019–20 season, Bachman through injury found himself as the Comet's third choice upon recovery. Limited to just 3 games, while in the final season of his contract, Bachman sought and was loaned by the Canucks to Swedish club, IK Oskarshamn of the Swedish Hockey League, for the remainder of the season on February 12, 2020. He made just 3 appearances in Sweden, going winless before the season was cancelled due to the COVID-19 pandemic.

== Coaching career ==
On October 2, 2020, Bachman announced his retirement from professional hockey after 11 seasons and became the goaltending coach for the Iowa Wild in the AHL.

== Career statistics ==
=== Regular season and playoffs ===
			Regular season									Playoffs
Season	Team	League	GP	W	L	T/OT	MIN	GA	SO	GAA	SV%	GP	W	L	MIN	GA	SO	GAA	SV%
2004–05	Cushing Academy	HSMA	28	—	—	—	1498	53	3	1.89	—	—	—	—	—	—	—	—	—
2005–06	Cushing Academy	HSMA	30	—	—	—	1598	60	4	2.25	—	—	—	—	—	—	—	—	—
2006–07	Chicago Steel	USHL	7	2	5	0	359	29	0	4.85	.888	—	—	—	—	—	—	—	—
2006–07	Cedar Rapids RoughRiders	USHL	26	14	10	2	1565	78	4	2.99	.913	6	4	1	329	7	2	1.28	.951
2007–08	Colorado College	WCHA	35	25	9	1	2103	65	4	1.85	.931	—	—	—	—	—	—	—	—
2008–09	Colorado College	WCHA	35	14	11	10	2073	91	3	2.63	.914	—	—	—	—	—	—	—	—
2009–10	Idaho Steelheads	ECHL	35	22	7	4	2028	77	4	2.28	.910	8	6	1	492	13	1	1.59	.943
2009–10	Texas Stars	AHL	8	4	4	0	446	16	1	2.15	.932	—	—	—	—	—	—	—	—
2010–11	Texas Stars	AHL	55	28	19	5	3191	117	6	2.20	.927	6	2	4	394	15	0	2.29	.917
2010–11	Dallas Stars	NHL	1	0	0	0	10	0	0	0.00	1.000	—	—	—	—	—	—	—	—
2011–12	Texas Stars	AHL	15	7	6	1	844	44	2	3.13	.887	—	—	—	—	—	—	—	—
2011–12	Dallas Stars	NHL	18	8	5	1	933	43	1	2.77	.910	—	—	—	—	—	—	—	—
2012–13	Texas Stars	AHL	6	5	1	0	175	14	0	2.31	.920	—	—	—	—	—	—	—	—
2012–13	Dallas Stars	NHL	13	6	5	0	288	33	0	3.25	.885	—	—	—	—	—	—	—	—
2013–14	Oklahoma City Barons	AHL	52	26	19	6	3074	153	2	2.99	.908	3	0	3	200	9	0	2.70	.914
2013–14	Edmonton Oilers	NHL	3	0	2	1	139	7	0	3.02	.916	—	—	—	—	—	—	—	—
2014–15	Oklahoma City Barons	AHL	23	14	5	3	1338	53	3	2.38	.918	9	5	4	581	15	0	1.55	.953
2014–15	Edmonton Oilers	NHL	7	3	2	0	317	15	1	2.84	.911	—	—	—	—	—	—	—	—
2015–16	Utica Comets	AHL	35	17	12	5	829	92	1	2.75	.900	3	0	2	106	7	0	3.96	.860
2015–16	Vancouver Canucks	NHL	1	1	0	0	60	3	0	3.00	.903	—	—	—	—	—	—	—	—
2016–17	Utica Comets	AHL	27	13	11	3	1584	70	1	2.65	.908	—	—	—	—	—	—	—	—
2016–17	Vancouver Canucks	NHL	5	2	3	0	296	13	0	2.64	.920	—	—	—	—	—	—	—	—
2017–18	Utica Comets	AHL	31	13	13	5	1834	91	0	2.98	.902	—	—	—	—	—	—	—	—
2018–19	Utica Comets	AHL	9	5	4	0	527	33	1	3.76	.884	—	—	—	—	—	—	—	—
2018–19	Vancouver Canucks	NHL	1	0	1	0	60	6	0	6.00	.793	—	—	—	—	—	—	—	—
2019–20	Utica Comets	AHL	3	1	1	1	185	10	0	3.25	.909	—	—	—	—	—	—	—	—
2019–20	IK Oskarshamn	SHL	3	0	2	0	128	7	0	3.29	.863	—	—	—	—	—	—	—	—
NHL totals			49	20	18	2	2422	120	2	2.97	.903	—	—	—	—	—	—	—	—

=== International ===
Year	Team	Event	GP	W	L	T	MIN	GA	SO	GAA	SV%
2012	United States	WC	1	1	0	0	65	2	0	1.86	.894
Senior totals			1	1	0	0	65	2	0	1.86	.894

== Awards and honors ==
Award	Year
College
All-WCHA Rookie Team	2008
All-WCHA First Team	2008
AHCA West First-Team All-American	2008
AHL
All-Star Game	2015

Awards and achievements
Preceded by Andreas Nödl	WCHA Rookie of the Year; 2007–08	Succeeded by Jordan Schroeder
Preceded by Ryan Duncan	WCHA Player of the Year; 2007–08	Succeeded by Jamie McBain
Preceded by Andreas Nödl	NCAA Rookie of the Year; 2007–08	Succeeded by Kieran Millan
