= 2004 IIHF World U18 Championship Division I =

Tournament details
- Host countries: Austria; Italy
- Dates: 27 March – 2 April 2004; 29 March – 4 April 2004
- Teams: 12

The 2004 IIHF World U18 Championship Division I was a pair of international under-18 ice hockey tournaments run by the International Ice Hockey Federation. The Division I tournaments made up the second level of competition at the 2004 IIHF World U18 Championships. The Group A tournament took place between 27 March and 2 April 2004 in Amstetten, Austria and the Group B tournament took place between 29 March and 4 April 2004 in Asiago, Italy. Switzerland and Germany won the Group A and Group B tournaments respectively and gained promotion to the Championship Division for the 2005 IIHF World U18 Championships. While Romania finished last in Group A and South Korea last in Group B and were both relegated to Division II for 2005.

== Group A tournament ==
The Group A tournament began on 27 March 2004 in Amstetten, Austria. Austria, Latvia, Poland and Slovenia all returned to compete in this year's Division I tournament after missing promotion to the Championship Division at the previous years World Championships. Romania gained promotion to Division I after finishing first in lasts years Division II tournament and Switzerland was relegated from the Championship Division after failing to survive the relegation round at the 2003 IIHF World U18 Championship.

Switzerland won the tournament after winning all five of their games, finishing first in the group standings and gained promotion to the Championship Division for the 2005 IIHF World U18 Championships. Slovenia finished in second place and Austria finished third after only losing to Switzerland and Slovenia. Romania finished in last place, managing only to tie one game and lose the other four and were relegated back to Division II for the 2005 IIHF World U18 Championships. Rafael Rotter of Austria finished as the top scorer of the tournament with eleven points including five goals and six assists. Latvia's Kristaps Stigis finished as the tournaments leading goaltender with a save percentage of 92.93.

=== Standings ===
Pos	Team	Pld	W	D	L	GF	GA	GD	Pts	Promotion or relegation
1	Switzerland	5	5	0	0	35	10	+25	10	Promoted to the Championship Division for 2005
2	Slovenia	5	3	1	1	20	13	+7	7	
3	Austria	5	3	0	2	21	18	+3	6	
4	Latvia	5	2	1	2	27	17	+10	5	
5	Poland	5	0	1	4	12	20	−8	1	
6	Romania	5	0	1	4	5	42	−37	1	Relegated to Division II for 2005

=== Fixtures ===
All times local.

27 March 2004; 13:00	Latvia	5 – 2 (2–0, 1–0, 2–2)	Poland	Amstetten; Attendance: 100

Game reference

27 March 2004; 16:30	Romania	1 – 12 (0–2, 0–4, 1–6)	Switzerland	Amstetten; Attendance: 100

Game reference

27 March 2004; 20:00	Austria	2 – 7 (1–3, 0–1, 1–3)	Slovenia	Amstetten; Attendance: 700

Game reference

28 March 2004; 13:00	Slovenia	6 – 1 (3–1, 2–0, 1–0)	Romania	Amstetten; Attendance: 50

Game reference

28 March 2004; 16:30	Switzerland	6 – 2 (4–0, 1–1, 1–1)	Latvia	Amstetten; Attendance: 70

Game reference

28 March 2004; 20:00	Poland	3 – 4 (2–0, 0–3, 1–1)	Austria	Amstetten; Attendance: 210

Game reference

30 March 2004; 13:00	Romania	0 – 14 (0–3, 0–7, 0–4)	Latvia	Amstetten; Attendance: 150

Game reference

30 March 2004; 16:30	Poland	1 – 2 (1–0, 0–1, 0–1)	Slovenia	Amstetten; Attendance: 100

Game reference

30 March 2004; 20:00	Switzerland	4 – 1 (0–1, 3–0, 1–0)	Austria	Amstetten; Attendance: 600

Game reference

31 March 2004; 13:00	Poland	2 – 2 (1–0, 1–1, 0–1)	Romania	Amstetten

Game reference

31 March 2004; 16:30	Slovenia	2 – 6 (1–1, 1–1, 0–4)	Switzerland	Amstetten; Attendance: 150

Game reference

31 March 2004; 20:00	Latvia	3 – 6 (0–1, 0–2, 3–3)	Austria	Amstetten; Attendance: 250

Game reference

2 April 2004; 13:00	Switzerland	7 – 4 (2–1, 2–2, 3–1)	Poland	Amstetten; Attendance: 150

Game reference

2 April 2004; 16:30	Slovenia	3 – 3 (0–1, 2–1, 1–1)	Latvia	Amstetten; Attendance: 200

Game reference

2 April 2004; 20:00	Austria	8 – 1 (1–1, 3–0, 4–0)	Romania	Amstetten; Attendance: 744

Game reference

=== Scoring leaders ===
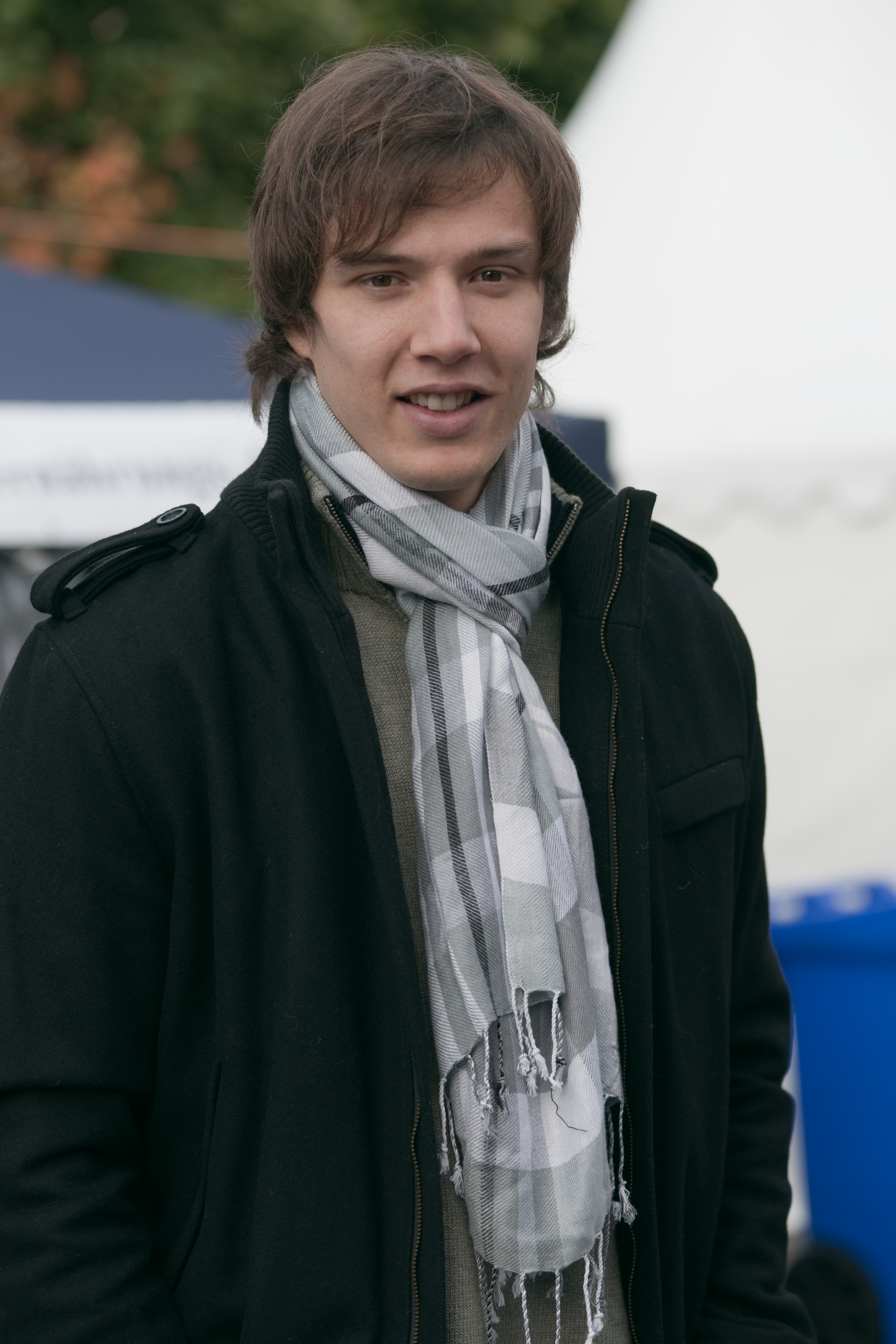
Julien Sprunger scored seven goals and two assists to finish second in scoring.

List shows the top ten skaters sorted by points, then goals.

Player	GP	G	A	Pts	+/-	PIM	POS
(Austria) Rafael Rotter	5	5	6	11	+10	2	F
(Switzerland) Julien Sprunger	5	7	2	9	+7	0	F
(Slovenia) Anze Kopitar	5	6	2	8	+3	0	F
(Latvia) Eduards Bullitis	5	4	4	8	+3	2	F
(Switzerland) Janick Steinmann	5	4	3	7	+7	2	F
(Slovenia) Anze Ahacic	5	2	5	7	+1	0	F
(Latvia) Artjoms Jemeljanenko	5	2	5	7	+4	4	F
(Poland) Jaroslaw Rzeszutko	5	4	2	6	-5	14	F
(Latvia) Jurijs Klujevskis	5	2	4	6	+2	14	F
(Latvia) Elviss Zelubovskis	5	4	1	5	+4	2	F

=== Leading goaltenders ===
Only the top five goaltenders, based on save percentage, who have played 40% of their team's minutes are included in this list.

Player	MIP	SOG	GA	GAA	SVS%	SO
(Latvia) Kristaps Stigis	188:04	103	8	2.55	92.23	1
(Slovenia) Gasper Kroselj	280:00	163	13	2.79	92.02	0
(Switzerland) Leonardo Genoni	234:45	73	6	1.53	91.78	1
(Austria) Stefan Horneber	180:00	103	10	3.33	90.29	0
(Poland) Daniel Kachniarz	266:29	139	17	3.83	87.77	0

== Group B tournament ==
The Group B tournament began on 29 March 2004 in Asiago, Italy. France, Germany, Italy and Japan all returned to compete in this year's Division I tournament after missing promotion to the Championship Division at the previous years World Championships. South Korea gained promotion to Division I after finishing first in lasts years Division II tournament and Kazakhstan was relegated from the Championship Division after failing to survive the relegation round at the 2003 IIHF World U18 Championship.

Germany won the tournament after winning all five of their games, finishing first in the group standings and gained promotion to the Championship Division for the 2005 IIHF World U18 Championships. Japan finished second after losing only to Germany and Italy finished in third place. South Korea finished in last place, managing only to tie one game and lose the other four and were relegated back to Division II for the 2005 IIHF World U18 Championships. Daniel Pietta of Germany finished as the top scorer of the tournament with eleven points including eight goals and three assists. Japan's Yuto Takashima finished as the tournaments leading goaltender with a save percentage of 96.59.

=== Standings ===
Pos	Team	Pld	W	D	L	GF	GA	GD	Pts	Promotion or relegation
1	Germany	5	5	0	0	38	12	+26	10	Promoted to the Championship Division for 2005
2	Japan	5	4	0	1	14	14	0	8	
3	Italy	5	2	1	2	14	16	−2	5	
4	Kazakhstan	5	1	1	3	12	19	−7	3	
5	France	5	1	1	3	14	13	+1	3	
6	South Korea	5	0	1	4	8	26	−18	1	Relegated to Division II for 2005

=== Fixtures ===
All times local.

29 March 2004; 14:00	France	1 – 2 (0–1, 0–1, 1–0)	Germany	Asiago; Attendance: 200

Game reference

29 March 2004; 17:00	South Korea	2 – 2 (1–0, 0–0, 1–2)	Kazakhstan	Asiago; Attendance: 220

Game reference

29 March 2004; 21:00	Japan	2 – 1 (2–0, 0–1, 0–0)	Italy	Asiago; Attendance: 1070

Game reference

30 March 2004; 11:00	Kazakhstan	3 – 2 (0–2, 3–0, 0–0)	France	Asiago; Attendance: 880

Game reference

30 March 2004; 14:00	Italy	5 – 1 (3–0, 1–1, 1–0)	South Korea	Asiago; Attendance: 950

Game reference

30 March 2004; 17:00	Germany	11 – 4 (3–2, 2–1, 6–1)	Japan	Asiago; Attendance: 290

Game reference

1 April 2004; 14:00	Kazakhstan	1 – 2 (0–0, 1–1, 0–1)	Japan	Asiago; Attendance: 250

Game reference

1 April 2004; 17:00	South Korea	2 – 7 (1–4, 1–1, 0–2)	France	Asiago; Attendance: 230

Game reference

1 April 2004; 20:30	Germany	7 – 1 (4–1, 1–0, 2–0)	Italy	Asiago; Attendance: 1610

Game reference

2 April 2004; 14:00	France	0 – 2 (0–0, 0–1, 0–1)	Japan	Asiago; Attendance: 320

Game reference

2 April 2004; 17:00	Germany	8 – 2 (2–2, 3–0, 3–0)	South Korea	Asiago; Attendance: 450

Game reference

2 April 2004; 20:30	Italy	3 – 2 (0–0, 2–0, 1–2)	Kazakhstan	Asiago; Attendance: 1580

Game reference

4 April 2004; 12:00	Kazakhstan	4 – 10 (0–2, 2–3, 2–5)	Germany	Asiago; Attendance: 220

Game reference

4 April 2004; 15:00	Japan	4 – 1 (0–0, 2–1, 2–0)	South Korea	Asiago; Attendance: 650

Game reference

4 April 2004; 18:30	Italy	4 – 4 (3–0, 0–4, 1–0)	France	Asiago; Attendance: 2100

Game reference

=== Scoring leaders ===
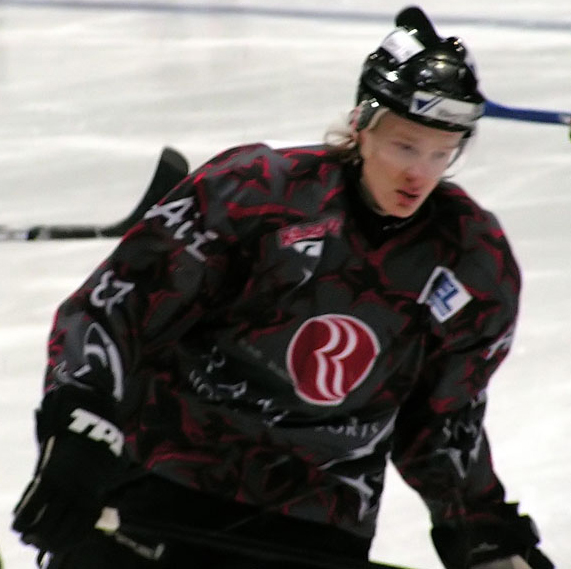
Philip Gogulla finished fifth in scoring after recording two goals and five assists.

List shows the top ten skaters sorted by points, then goals.

Player	GP	G	A	Pts	+/-	PIM	POS
(Germany) Daniel Pietta	5	8	3	11	+5	6	F
(Germany) Thomas Pielmeier	5	8	2	10	+11	4	F
(Germany) Philipp Schlager	5	2	8	10	+8	4	F
(Germany) Andre Schietzold	5	4	5	9	+5	4	F
(Germany) Philip Gogulla	5	2	5	7	+3	16	F
(Germany) Christoph Gawlik	5	2	4	6	+5	27	F
(Germany) Mats Schobel	4	3	2	5	+3	25	F
(Germany) Moritz Muller	5	3	2	5	+2	4	F
(Kazakhstan) Andrei Bordyug	5	3	2	5	+1	6	F
(Germany) Anton Saal	5	2	3	5	+9	0	F

=== Leading goaltenders ===
Only the top five goaltenders, based on save percentage, who have played 40% of their team's minutes are included in this list.

Player	MIP	SOG	GA	GAA	SVS%	SO
(Japan) Yuto Takashima	186:13	88	3	0.97	96.59	1
(Germany) Youri Ziffzer	160:00	85	4	1.50	95.29	0
(Italy) Thomas Tragust	285:56	165	13	2.73	92.12	0
(Kazakhstan) Sergey Khudyakov	280:28	159	13	2.78	91.82	1
(France) Joffrey Pingrit	298:39	133	13	2.61	90.23	0
