= Tipsport Hockey Cup =

The Tipsport Hockey Cup was the national ice hockey cup competition in the Czech Republic. It was first played as the Zepter Hockey Cup in 2000.

== Champions ==
Year	Team 1	Score	Team 2
2000; Details	HC IPB Pojišťovna Pardubice	1 : 2 (0:0,1:2,0:0)	HC České Budějovice
2001; Details	HC Vítkovice	2 : 5 (1:0,1:2,0:3)	HC Sparta Praha
2002; Details	HC Chemopetrol Litvínov	3 : 2 OT (0:1,2:0,0:1,1:0)	HC JME Znojemští Orli
2003; Details	HC JME Znojemští Orli	2 : 1 (1:0,1:1,0:0)	HC Sparta Praha
2007; Details	HC Moeller Pardubice	3 : 2 SO (1:0,0:1,1:1,0:0)	HC Energie Karlovy Vary
2008; Details	HC Znojemští Orli	4 : 5 (2:1,2:1,0:3)	HC Kometa Brno
2009; Details	HC Sparta Praha	2 : 1 (1:0,0:0,1:1)	PSG Zlín
2010; Details	HC Plzeň 1929	3 : 2 OT (0:0, 0:1, 2:1 - 1:0)	Orli Znojmo
2020; Details	HC Dynamo Pardubice	3 : 6 (0:3, 3:3)	HC Oceláři Třinec

== Titles by team ==
Titles	Club	Year
2	HC Sparta Praha	2001, 2009
1	HC České Budějovice	2000
1	HC Moeller Pardubice	2007
1	HC Chemopetrol Litvínov	2002
1	HC JME Znojemští Orli	2003
1	HC Kometa Brno	2008
1	HC Plzeň 1929	2010
1	HC Oceláři Třinec	2020
