= Adam Sedlák =

Czech ice hockey player

- Born: 21 September 1991 (age 33); Ostrava, Czechoslovakia
- Height: 191 cm (6 ft 3 in)
- Weight: 97 kg (214 lb; 15 st 4 lb)
- Position: Defence
- Shoots: Right
- 2.Liga team Former teams: Orli Znojmo; HC Vítkovice; SønderjyskE; Asiago; Dijon; Knoxville Ice Bears; Banská Bystrica
- NHL draft: Undrafted
- Playing career: 2006–present

Adam Sedlák (born 21 September 1991) is a Czech ice hockey defenceman currently playing for Orli Znojmo of the 2nd Czech Republic Hockey League

He joined Znojmo from HC '05 Banská Bystrica of the Slovak Tipsport liga.
