= Rafael Rotter =

Austrian ice hockey player

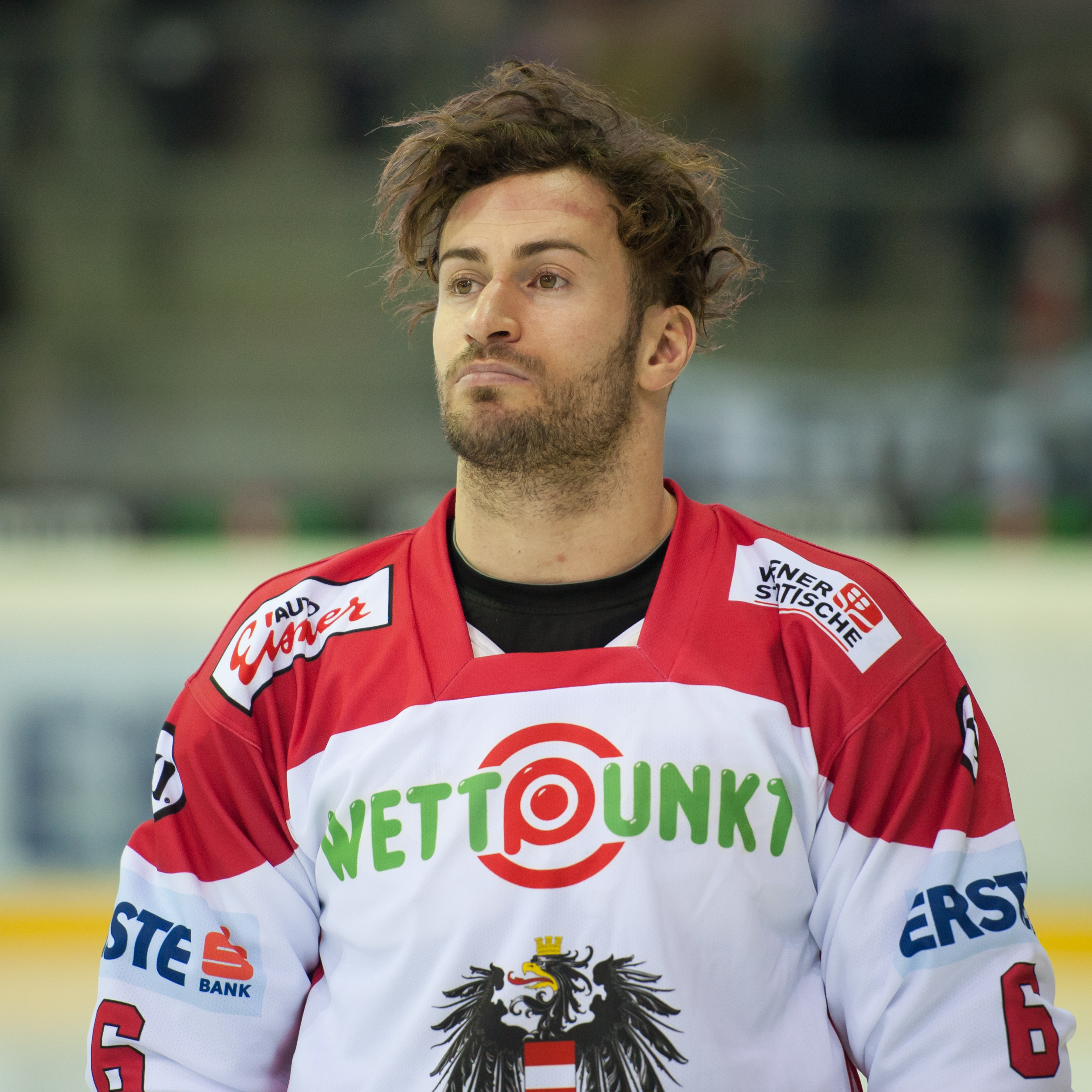
- Born: June 14, 1987 (age 37); Vienna, Austria
- Height: 5 ft 9 in (175 cm)
- Weight: 174 lb (79 kg; 12 st 6 lb)
- Position: Forward
- Shoots: Right
- ICEHL team Former teams: Vienna Capitals; EC Red Bull Salzburg; Black Wings Linz
- National team: Austria
- NHL draft: Undrafted
- Playing career: 2008–present

Rafael Rotter (born June 14, 1987) is an Austrian professional ice hockey forward. He is currently playing for the Vienna Capitals of the ICE Hockey League (ICEHL). On April 30, 2015, in marking his eight year with the club, Rotter was signed to a two-year contract extension with the Capitals.

Rotter participated at the 2011 IIHF World Championship as a member of the Austria men's national ice hockey team.

== Awards and honours ==
Award	Year
EBEL
Ron Kennedy Trophy (MVP)	2018
