= 2019–20 Austrian Hockey League season =

2019–20 Erste Bank Eishockey Liga
- League: Erste Bank Eishockey Liga
- Sport: Ice hockey
- Duration: 13 September 2019 – 3 March 2020
- Teams: 11

Regular season

Austrian Hockey League seasons
- 2018–19 season 2020–21 season

The 2019–20 Austrian Hockey League season began on 13 September 2019. The defending champion's are EC KAC.

Following the conclusion of his previous season Croatian club, KHL Medveščak Zagreb, announced their withdrawal from the EBEL citing financial difficulties. With the reduction to the 11 team league, the EBEL announced changes in the second round of the season, taking place from 26 January 2020.

The placement round will be reduced to a pool of 5 teams, qualifying automatically for the post-season while each playing 8 games for seeding. The bottom placed 6 teams are drawn into the Qualifying round with each team playing 10 games, with the highest 3 ranked clubs advancing to the post-season.

The season was prematurely ended on 3 March 2020 due to concerns about the 2020 coronavirus outbreak in Europe.

== Teams ==
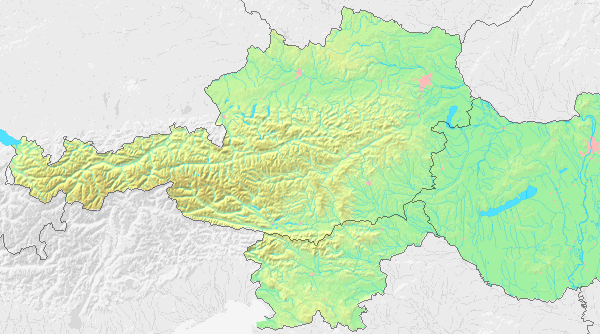
Teams participating in the 2019–20 season

Team	City	Arena	Capacity
Dornbirn Bulldogs	(Austria) Dornbirn	Messestadion Dornbirn	4,270
Moser Medical Graz 99ers	(Austria) Graz	Merkur-Eisarena	4,126
HC TWK Innsbruck	(Austria) Innsbruck	Tiroler Wasserkraft Arena	3,000
EC KAC	(Austria) Klagenfurt	Stadthalle Klagenfurt	4,945
EHC LIWEST Black Wings Linz	(Austria) Linz	Keine Sorgen EisArena	4,863
EC Red Bull Salzburg	(Austria) Salzburg	Eisarena Salzburg	3,200
Vienna Capitals	(Austria) Vienna	Erste Bank Arena	7,022
EC Panaceo VSV	(Austria) Villach	Stadthalle Villach	4,500
HC Orli Znojmo	(Czech Republic) Znojmo	Hostan Arena	4,800
Hydro Fehérvár AV19	(Hungary) Székesfehérvár	Ifjabb Ocskay Gábor Ice Hall	3,500
HCB Südtirol Alperia	(Italy) Bolzano	Eiswelle	7,200

== Standings ==
=== Regular season ===
Legend: Qualified for 2020–21 Champions Hockey League Qualified for placement round Qualified for qualification round

Rank	Team	GP	W	L	OTW	OTL	GF	GA	GD	Points
1	EC Red Bull Salzburg	40	22	7	6	5	138	82	+56	83
2	Vienna Capitals	40	23	10	2	5	130	86	+44	78
3	EC KAC	40	19	14	4	3	110	79	+31	68
4	Graz 99ers	40	18	14	4	4	113	113	0	66
5	HC Bozen	40	18	15	5	2	118	96	+22	66
6	EC VSV	40	17	15	5	3	122	109	+13	64
7	Black Wings Linz	40	17	14	3	6	132	132	0	63
8	Orli Znojmo	40	17	16	3	4	128	133	−5	61
9	Fehérvár AV19	40	13	19	4	4	108	137	−29	51
10	HC Innsbruck	40	7	26	3	4	100	159	−59	31
11	Dornbirn Bulldogs	40	6	27	4	3	84	157	−73	29

=== Placement round ===
Qualified for 2020–21 Champions Hockey League Qualified as higher seed Qualified as lower seed

Rank	Team	GP	W	L	OTW	OTL	GF	GA	GD	Points
1	HC Bozen	8	7	1	0	0	27	11	+16	21 (0)
2	EC Red Bull Salzburg	8	4	2	2	0	22	21	+1	20 (4)
3	Vienna Capitals	8	3	4	1	0	25	24	+1	13 (2)
4	EC KAC	8	2	3	0	3	19	22	−3	10 (1)
5	EC Graz 99ers	8	0	6	1	1	19	34	−15	3 (0)

=== Qualification round ===
Qualified for playoffs Eliminated from playoff contention

Rank	Team	GP	W	L	OTW	OTL	GF	GA	GD	Points
1	EC VSV	10	4	3	2	1	30	27	+3	25 (8)
2	Black Wings Linz	10	5	3	1	1	38	32	+6	24 (6)
3	HC Orli Znojmo	10	4	3	0	3	25	28	−3	19 (4)
4	Fehérvár AV19	10	3	4	2	1	35	29	+6	16 (2)
5	HC Innsbruck	10	4	4	1	1	33	32	+1	16 (1)
6	Dornbirn Bulldogs	10	2	5	2	1	23	36	−13	11 (0)

== Playoffs ==
Quarterfinals
PL1	HC Bozen	1
QU3	HC Orli Znojmo	0
PL2	EC Red Bull Salzburg	0
QU1	EC VSV	1
PL3	Vienna Capitals	1
PL5	EC Graz 99ers	0
PL4	EC KAC	0
QU2	Black Wings Linz	1

Semifinals

Finals
