= 2018–19 Austrian Hockey League season =

2018–19 Erste Bank Eishockey Liga
- League: Erste Bank Eishockey Liga
- Sport: Ice hockey
- Duration: 14 September 2018 – 24 April 2019
- Teams: 12

Regular season
- Season champions: Graz 99ers
- Season MVP: Peter Schneider
- Top scorer: Peter Schneider
- Finals champions: EC KAC
- Runners-up: Vienna Capitals

Austrian Hockey League seasons
- 2017–18 season 2019–20 season

The 2018–19 Austrian Hockey League season began on 14 September 2018 and ended on 24 April 2019. The defending champion were HC Bolzano. On 24 April 2018, EC KAC won the Austrian Hockey Championship for the 31st time in their history.

Following the regular season, bottom placed KHL Medveščak Zagreb announced they would not be participating in the second phase of the season at the qualifying round due to financial and scheduling difficulties on 28 January 2019. The Qualifying round was reduced to a pool of 5 teams each playing 8 games.

== Teams ==
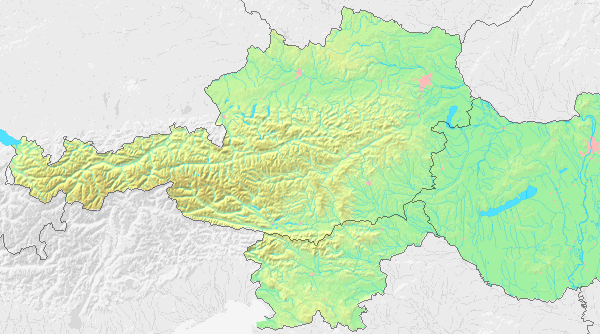
Teams that participated in the 2018–19 season

| Team | City | Arena | Capacity |
| Dornbirn Bulldogs | (Austria) Dornbirn | Messestadion Dornbirn | 4,270 |
| Moser Medical Graz 99ers | (Austria) Graz | Merkur-Eisarena | 4,126 |
| HC TWK Innsbruck | (Austria) Innsbruck | Tyrolean Ice Arena | 3,000 |
| EC KAC | (Austria) Klagenfurt | Stadthalle Klagenfurt | 4,945 |
| EHC LIWEST Black Wings Linz | (Austria) Linz | Keine Sorgen EisArena | 4,863 |
| EC Red Bull Salzburg | (Austria) Salzburg | Eisarena Salzburg | 3,200 |
| Vienna Capitals | (Austria) Vienna | Albert Schultz Eishalle | 7,022 |
| EC Panaceo VSV | (Austria) Villach | Stadthalle Villach | 4,500 |
| HC Orli Znojmo | (Czech Republic) Znojmo | Hostan Arena | 4,800 |
| SAPA Fehérvár AV19 | (Hungary) Székesfehérvár | Ifjabb Ocskay Gábor Ice Hall | 3,500 |
| HCB Alto Adige Alperia | (Italy) Bolzano | Eiswelle | 7,200 |
| Medveščak Zagreb | (Croatia) Zagreb | Dom Sportova & Arena Zagreb | 5,000 & 15,000 |

== Standings ==
=== Regular season ===
| Rank | Team | GP | W | L | OTW | OTL | Goals | Diff. | Pts |
|---|---|---|---|---|---|---|---|---|---|
| 1 | Graz 99ers | 44 | 23 | 11 | 8 | 2 | 170:118 | +52 | 87 |
| 2 | Vienna Capitals | 44 | 24 | 10 | 5 | 5 | 162:117 | +45 | 87 |
| 3 | EC KAC | 44 | 22 | 12 | 7 | 3 | 146:96 | +50 | 83 |
| 4 | EC Red Bull Salzburg | 44 | 21 | 14 | 4 | 5 | 181:125 | +56 | 76 |
| 5 | HC Bolzano | 44 | 22 | 14 | 2 | 6 | 131:108 | +23 | 76 |
| 6 | Fehérvár AV19 | 44 | 19 | 14 | 6 | 5 | 166:148 | +18 | 74 |
| 7 | EHC Black Wings Linz | 44 | 20 | 17 | 2 | 5 | 142:129 | +13 | 69 |
| 8 | Orli Znojmo | 44 | 19 | 21 | 1 | 3 | 164:163 | +1 | 62 |
| 9 | Dornbirn Bulldogs | 44 | 17 | 18 | 2 | 7 | 136:148 | -12 | 62 |
| 10 | HC TWK Innsbruck | 44 | 13 | 19 | 8 | 4 | 148:164 | -16 | 59 |
| 11 | EC VSV | 44 | 8 | 29 | 5 | 2 | 110:158 | -48 | 36 |
| 12 | KHL Medveščak Zagreb | 44 | 6 | 35 | 0 | 3 | 78:260 | -182 | 21 |

=== Placement round ===
| Rank | Team | GP | W | L | OTW | OTL | Goals | Diff. | Pts (Bonus) |
|---|---|---|---|---|---|---|---|---|---|
| 1 | Vienna Capitals | 10 | 8 | 0 | 2 | 0 | 47:21 | +26 | 32 (4) |
| 2 | Graz 99ers | 10 | 6 | 3 | 0 | 1 | 32:28 | +4 | 25 (6) |
| 3 | EC KAC | 10 | 4 | 5 | 1 | 0 | 28:22 | +6 | 16 (2) |
| 4 | Fehérvár AV19 | 10 | 4 | 6 | 0 | 0 | 26:31 | -5 | 12 (0) |
| 5 | EC Red Bull Salzburg | 10 | 2 | 5 | 1 | 2 | 23:39 | -16 | 11 (1) |
| 6 | HC Bolzano | 10 | 2 | 7 | 0 | 1 | 25:40 | -15 | 7 (0) |

=== Qualification round ===
| Rank | Team | GP | W | L | OTW | OTL | Goals | Diff. | Pts (Bonus) |
|---|---|---|---|---|---|---|---|---|---|
| 1 | EHC Black Wings Linz | 8 | 3 | 2 | 0 | 3 | 25:32 | -7 | 18 (6) |
| 2 | Orli Znojmo | 8 | 4 | 3 | 1 | 0 | 37:23 | +14 | 18 (4) |
| 3 | HC TWK Innsbruck | 8 | 4 | 3 | 0 | 1 | 27:24 | +3 | 14 (1) |
| 4 | EC VSV | 8 | 4 | 4 | 0 | 0 | 18:18 | 0 | 12 (0) |
| 5 | Dornbirn Bulldogs | 8 | 1 | 4 | 3 | 0 | 20:30 | -10 | 11 (2) |

== Playoffs ==
Quarterfinals
P1 | Vienna Capitals | 4
Q2 | Orli Znojmo | 1
P4 | Fehérvár AV19 | 2
P5 | EC Red Bull Salzburg | 4
P2 | Graz 99ers | 4
Q1 | EHC Black Wings Linz | 2
P3 | EC KAC | 4
P6 | HC Bolzano | 1

Semifinals
P1 | Vienna Capitals | 4
P5 | EC Red Bull Salzburg | 3
P2 | Graz 99ers | 0
P3 | EC KAC | 4

Finals
P1 | Vienna Capitals | 2
P3 | EC KAC | 4
