= 2017–18 Austrian Hockey League season =

2017–18 Erste Bank Eishockey Liga
- League: Erste Bank Eishockey Liga
- Sport: Ice hockey
- Duration: 8 September 2017 – 20 April 2018
- Teams: 12

Regular season
- Season champions: Vienna Capitals
- Season MVP: Rafael Rotter
- Top scorer: Rafael Rotter
- Finals champions: HC Bolzano
- Runners-up: EC Red Bull Salzburg

Austrian Hockey League seasons
- 2016–17 season 2018–19 season

The 2017–18 Austrian Hockey League season began on 8 September 2017 and ended on 20 April 2018. The defending champion were the Vienna Capitals. On 20 April 2018, HC Bolzano won the Austrian Hockey Championship for the 2nd time in their history.

With Slovenian club, HDD Olimpija Ljubljana ending their tenure in the EBEL having been dissolved due to financial debt. The EBEL continued with 12 teams, following the return of KHL Medveščak Zagreb from a five year stint in the Kontinental Hockey League. The Croatian club had previously participated in the EBEL for four seasons from 2009 to 2013.

== Teams ==
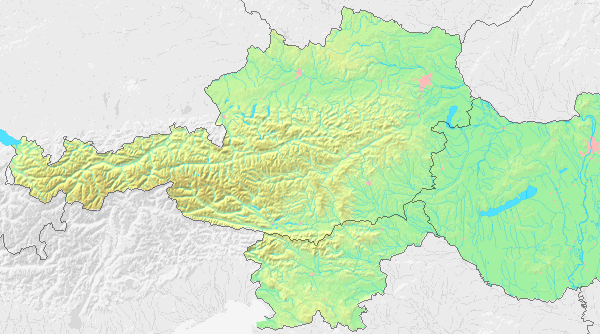
Teams that participated in the 2017–18 season

Team	City	Arena	Capacity
Dornbirn Bulldogs	(Austria) Dornbirn	Messestadion Dornbirn	4,270
Moser Medical Graz 99ers	(Austria) Graz	Merkur-Eisarena	4,126
HC TWK Innsbruck	(Austria) Innsbruck	Tyrolean Ice Arena	3,000
EC KAC	(Austria) Klagenfurt	Stadthalle Klagenfurt	4,945
EHC LIWEST Black Wings Linz	(Austria) Linz	Keine Sorgen EisArena	4,863
EC Red Bull Salzburg	(Austria) Salzburg	Eisarena Salzburg	3,200
Vienna Capitals	(Austria) Vienna	Albert Schultz Eishalle	7,022
EC Villacher SV	(Austria) Villach	Stadthalle Villach	4,500
HC Orli Znojmo	(Czech Republic) Znojmo	Hostan Arena	4,800
SAPA Fehérvár AV19	(Hungary) Székesfehérvár	Ifjabb Ocskay Gábor Ice Hall	3,500
HCB Alto Adige Alperia	(Italy) Bolzano	Eiswelle	7,200
Medveščak Zagreb	(Croatia) Zagreb	Dom Sportova & Arena Zagreb	5,000 & 15,000

== Standings ==
=== Regular season ===
Rank	Team	GP	W	L	OTW	OTL	Goals	Diff.	Pts
1	Vienna Capitals	44	28	9	2	5	146:97	+49	93
2	EC Red Bull Salzburg	44	25	15	3	1	158:116	+42	82
3	EHC Black Wings Linz	44	24	13	3	4	155:122	+33	82
4	EC KAC	44	21	17	2	4	120:112	+8	71
5	HC TWK Innsbruck	44	18	16	7	3	146:132	+14	71
6	KHL Medveščak Zagreb	44	17	19	4	4	139:139	0	63
7	Dornbirn Bulldogs	44	15	18	5	6	127:133	-6	61
8	Graz 99ers	44	16	21	5	2	133:153	-20	60
9	HC Bolzano	44	15	20	4	5	124:125	-1	58
10	Fehérvár AV19	44	12	22	6	4	100:144	-45	52
11	EC VSV	44	14	24	2	4	112:146	-34	50
12	Orli Znojmo	44	11	22	5	6	112:152	-40	49

=== Placement round ===
Rank	Team	GP	W	L	OTW	OTL	Goals	Diff.	Pts (Bonus)
1	Vienna Capitals	10	5	3	1	1	39:28	+11	24 (6)
2	EC Red Bull Salzburg	10	5	2	2	1	41:30	+11	24 (4)
3	EHC Black Wings Linz	10	5	3	1	1	38:36	+2	20 (2)
4	EC KAC	10	4	4	0	2	23:31	-8	15 (1)
5	KHL Medveščak Zagreb	10	3	5	1	1	28:32	-4	12 (0)
6	HC TWK Innsbruck	10	2	7	1	0	28:40	-12	8 (0)

=== Qualification round ===
Rank	Team	GP	W	L	OTW	OTL	Goals	Diff.	Pts (Bonus)
1	Dornbirn Bulldogs	10	6	1	1	2	41:30	+11	28 (6)
2	HC Bolzano	10	5	3	2	0	31:16	+15	21 (2)
3	Fehérvár AV19	10	5	2	1	2	25:23	+2	20 (1)
4	Orli Znojmo	10	3	3	1	3	28:24	+4	14 (0)
5	EC VSV	10	3	5	1	1	25:36	-11	12 (0)
6	Graz 99ers	10	0	8	2	0	21:42	-21	8 (4)

== Playoffs ==
Quarterfinals
P1	Vienna Capitals	4
P6	HC TWK Innsbruck	2
P4	EC KAC	2
Q2	HC Bolzano	4
P2	EC Red Bull Salzburg	4
Q1	Dornbirn Bulldogs	2
P3	EHC Black Wings Linz	4
P5	KHL Medveščak Zagreb	2

Semifinals
P1	Vienna Capitals	1
Q2	HC Bolzano	4
P2	EC Red Bull Salzburg	4
P3	EHC Black Wings Linz	2

Finals
Q2	HC Bolzano	4
P2	EC Red Bull Salzburg	3
