= Stadthalle (Villach) =

Indoor sporting arena in Villach, Austria

Coordinates: 46°36′50″N 13°49′53″E

Stadthalle Villach
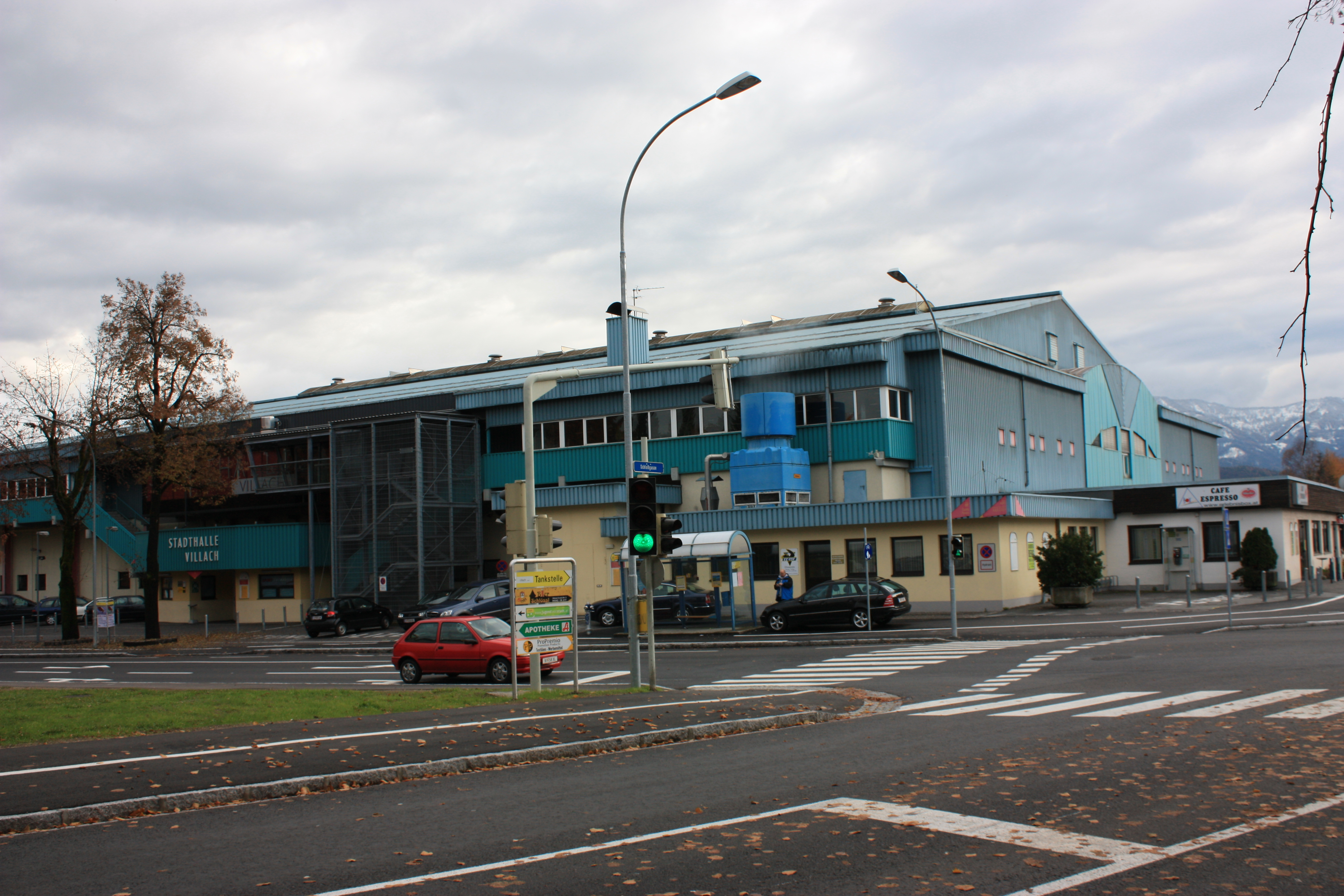
- Interactive map of Stadthalle Villach
- Location: Tiroler Straße 47, 9500 Villach
- Capacity: 4,500

Construction
- Opened: 1969

Tenant
- EC VSV (EBEL)

Stadthalle Villach is an indoor sporting arena located in Villach, Austria. The arena has a capacity of 4,500 people and was built in 1969. It is currently home to the EC VSV ice hockey team of the Austrian Hockey League.
