= Nevoga Arena =

Indoor sporting arena in Znojmo, Czech Republic

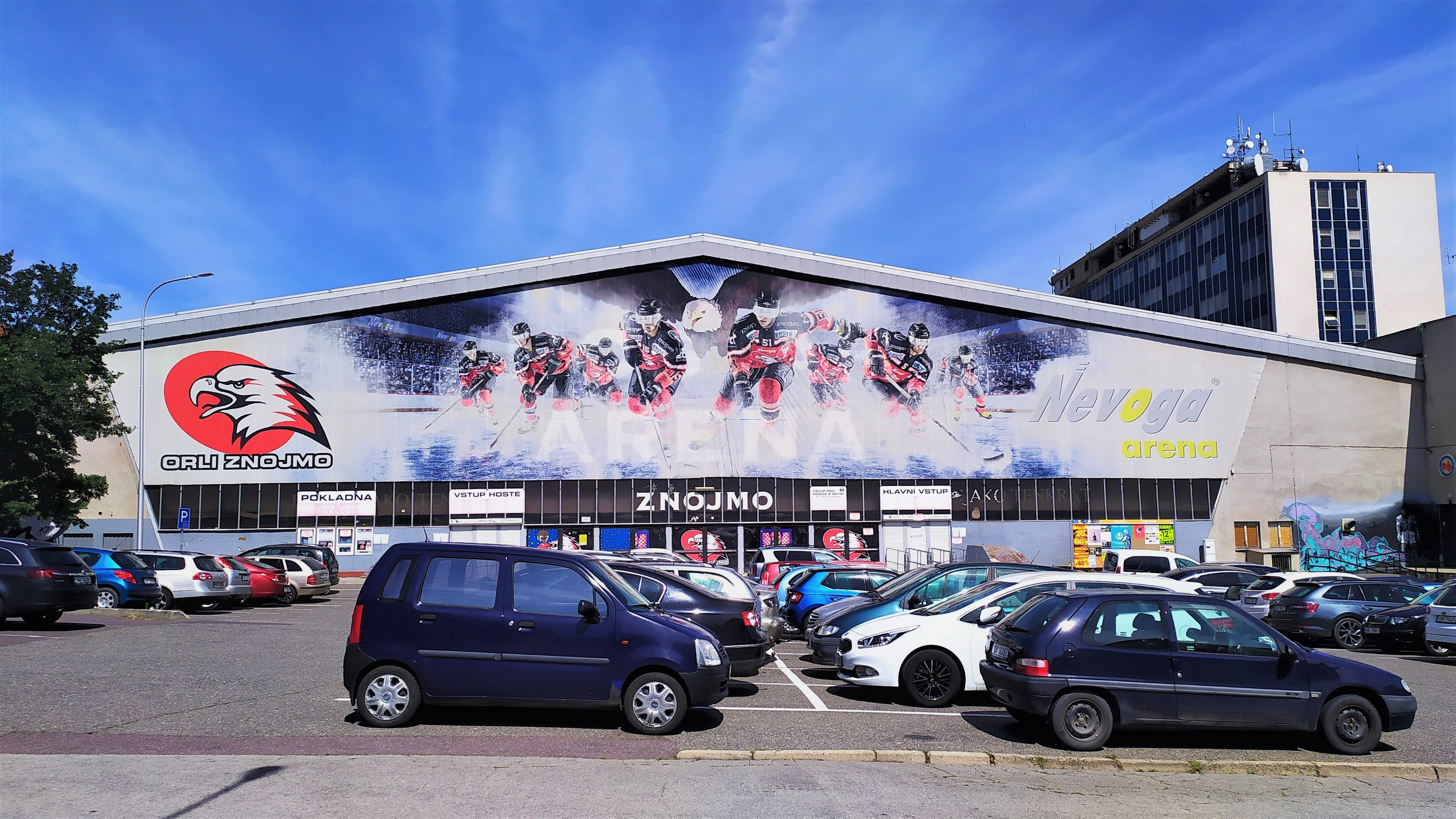
- Interactive map of Nevoga Arena
- Former names: Hostan Arena
- Location: Dvořákova 21, Znojmo, Czech Republic, 669 02
- Coordinates: 48.8603458°N 16.0435688°E
- Capacity: 4,800

Construction
- Opened: 1970
- Renovated: 1996

Tenant
- Orli Znojmo (Chance Liga)

Nevoga Arena, also known as Zimní stadion Znojmo, is an indoor sporting arena located in Znojmo, Czech Republic, which is currently home to the Orli Znojmo ice hockey team of the Chance Liga. The arena has a capacity of 4,800 people and was built in 1970.
