= Eisstadion Liebenau =

Architectural structure

Coordinates: 47°02′41″N 15°27′19″E

Merkur-Eisstadion
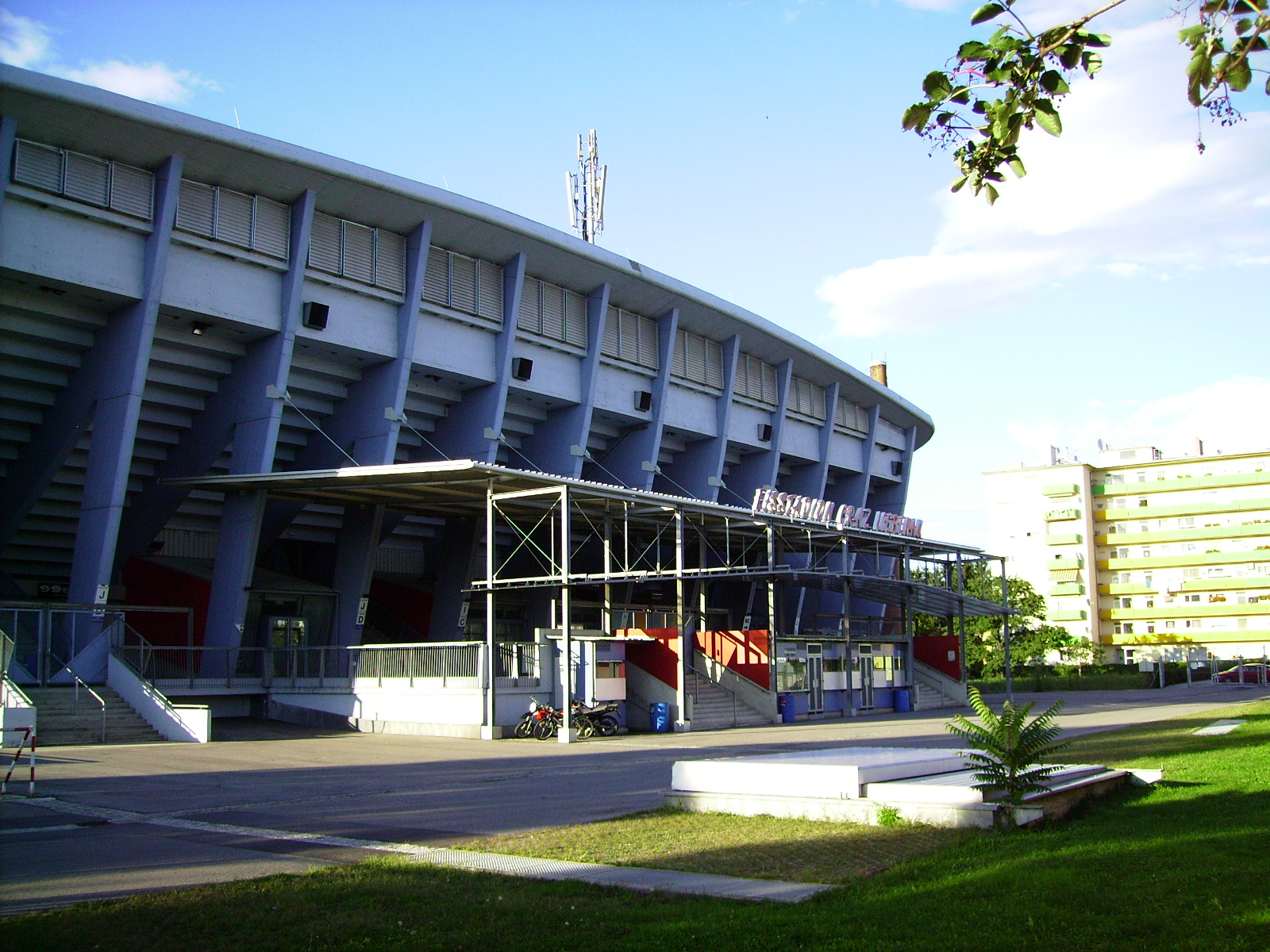
- Eisstadion Liebenau
- Interactive map of Merkur-Eisstadion
- Location: Stadionplatz 1, 8041 Graz
- Capacity: 4,126

Construction
- Opened: 1963

Tenants
- ATSE Graz (1963–1990, 2009–present); Graz 99ers (1999–present)

Eisstadion Liebenau, currently named Merkur Eisstadion for sponsorship reasons, is an indoor sporting arena located in Graz, Austria. The arena was built in 1963 and can accommodate 4,126 spectators. It is home to the Graz 99ers of the ICE Hockey League.
