= Orli Znojmo =

HC LERAM Orli Znojmo
- City: Znojmo, Czech Republic
- League: Czech Extraliga (1999–2009); ICE Hockey League (2011–2020, 2021–2022); 2nd Czech Republic Hockey League (2020–2021, 2022–2023, 2024–present); Chance Liga (2009–2011, 2023–2024)
- Founded: 1933; 93 years ago as TJ Sokol Znojmo
- Home arena: Nevoga Arena (Capacity: 4,500)
- Colors
- Owner: Pavel Ohera
- General manager: Petr Hrachovina
- Head coach: Milan Procházka
- Website: Znojmo

Franchise history
- 1933–1993: TJ Sokol Znojmo
- 1993–1997: SK Agropodnik Znojmo
- 1997–2001: HC Excalibur Znojemští Orli
- 2001–2006: HC JME Znojemští Orli
- 2006–2009: HC Znojemští Orli
- 2009–: Orli Znojmo

Championships
- Czech 1. Liga: 2 (1998, 1999)

Orli Znojmo (in English Znojmo Eagles) is a Czech-based ice hockey team that currently plays in the 2nd Czech Republic Hockey League. The club Orli Znojmo is based in Znojmo and their home arena is Nevoga Arena.

From 1999 to 2009, the club competed in the Czech Extraliga. Their biggest success in that league was a third-place finish in 2005–06. National Hockey League players Patrik Eliáš, Martin Havlát and Tomáš Vokoun played for this club during the 2004–05 NHL lockout. On 1 April 2009, Orli sold its Czech Extraliga license to another South Moravian club, HC Kometa Brno.

After two seasons in the Czech First League, the club announced on 31 May 2011 that they were joining the Austrian-based Erste Bank Hockey League.

== History ==
The club was founded in 1933 originally as TJ Sokol Znojmo and played until the early 1990s, at only a regional level. In 1993, Znojmo entered a sponsorship with Czech-Austrian company Excalibur under Jaroslav Vlasak. With this financial support club moved to become a professional outfit and in 1994 joined the Czech Second League. Renamed SK Agropodnik Znojmo, they competed for the following three seasons in the Second League. From 1996, the club served as an affiliate to Extraliga clubs, HC Pardubice and HC Dukla Jihlava, in order to further establish junior players experience.

In their two seasons in the Czech First League, Znojmo now known as HC Excalibur Znojemští Orli, in reflecting their sponsorship, formed a competitive team and won their first Championship title in 1997–98 before failing to gain promotion in a 4:3 series defeat to HC Slezan Opava. After claiming their second consecutive title in the 1998–99 season, Znojmo were victorious in the promotion playoffs against Dukla Jihlava to celebrate their first entry into the Czech Extraliga.

In the following years, the club was able to hold its own in the Extraliga, but never managed to get past the playoff semi-finals. In 2001 was called again changed their name due to sponsorship to new sponsor in HC JME Znojemští Orli. The club's largest success in the Extraliga came in the achievement of the play-off semi-final in the 2005–06 season.

After two seasons in the First League in the spring of 2011, the club applied for inclusion in the Austrian Erste Bank Eishockey Liga. Under the ambition to give the team a new perspective, without having to take the financial risk of promotion in the Extraliga. On 31 May 2011, the EBEL granted the application after the Czech Ice Hockey Association's consent on the condition that the club continues to participate with a team in the first league. This requirement was not later maintained.

Following the 2021–22 season, the club announced they will compete in the 2nd Czech Republic Hockey League next season, having bought the licence of HC Kometa Brno B. They left the ICE Hockey League owing to economic reasons and the uncertain continuation of the league.

== Honours ==
=== Domestic ===
Czech Extraliga

- (bronze) 3rd place (1): 2005–06

=== International ===
Austrian Hockey League

- (silver) Runners-up (1): 2015–16

=== Pre-season ===
Tipsport Hockey Cup

- (gold) Winners (1): 2003
- (silver) Runners-up (3): 2002, 2008, 2010

== Players ==
=== Current roster ===
Source: hcorli.czSource: eliteprospects.comAs of December 4, 2021.

No.	Nat	Player	Pos	S/G	Age	Acquired	Birthplace
98	(Czech Republic)	Dominik Groh	G	L	28	2019	Vrchlabí, Czech Republic
53	(Czech Republic)	Radim Matuš (C)	RW	L	32	2017	Třinec, Czech Republic
88	(Canada)	Anthony Luciani	RW	R	36	2021	Maple, Ontario, Canada
34	(Czech Republic)	Vladimír Oščádal	F	L	28	2017	Znojmo, Czech Republic
16	(Czech Republic)	Adam Sedlák	D	R	34	2018	Ostrava, Czechoslovakia
23	(Czech Republic)	Tomáš Svoboda	RW	R	39	2019	Litoměřice, Czechoslovakia
7	(Canada)	Ryan Culkin	D	L	32	2021	Montreal, Quebec, Canada
17	(Czech Republic)	Filip Haman	D	R	28	2021	Brno, Czech Republic
