= Steffl Arena =

Indoor sporting arena in Vienna, Austria

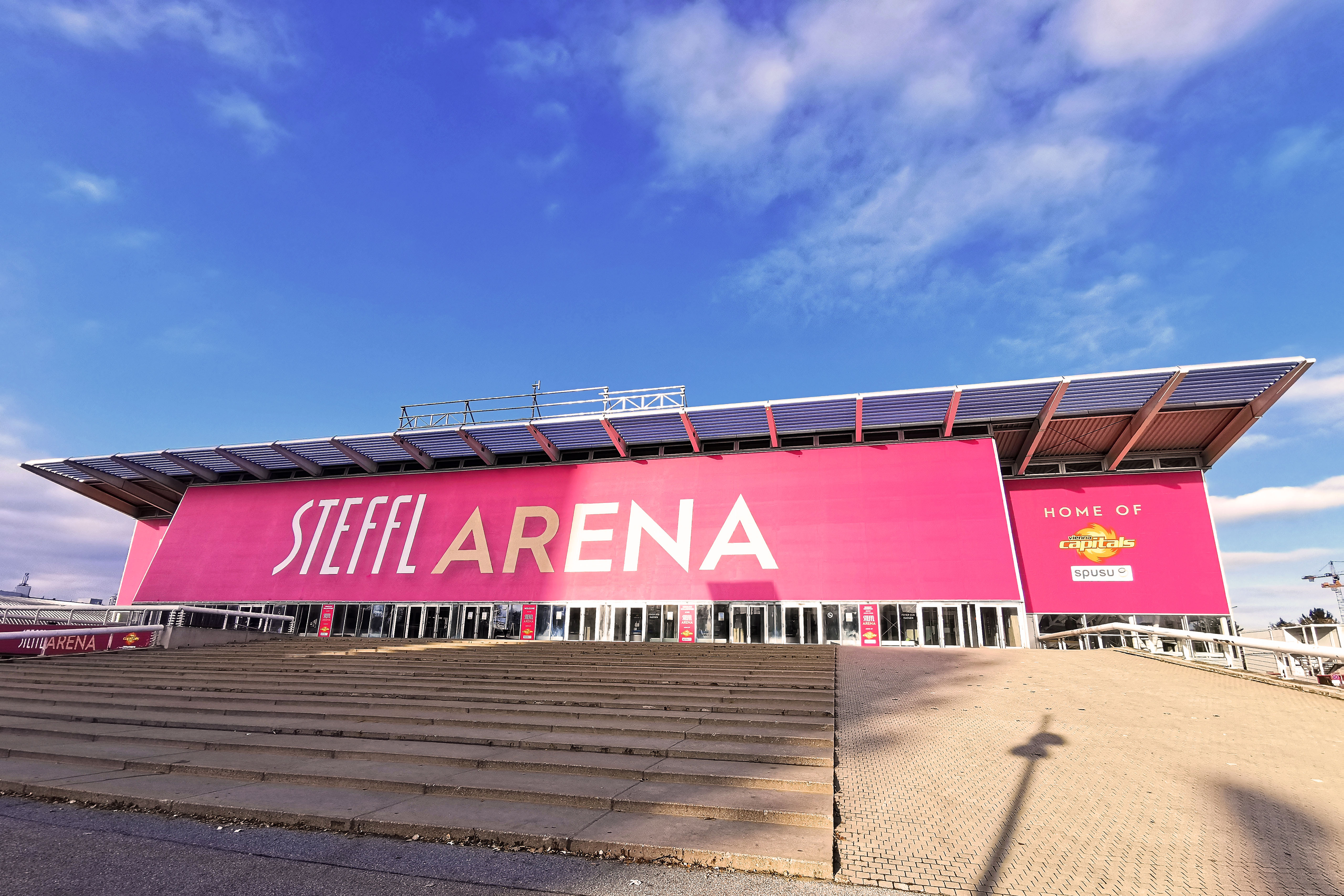
- Steffl Arena in November 2021
- Interactive map of Steffl Arena
- Former names: Albert Schultz Eishalle (1995–2018); Erste Bank Arena (2018–2021)
- Location: Attemsgasse 1, 1220 Vienna, Austria
- Coordinates: 48°14′45″N 16°26′00″E
- Owner: City of Vienna
- Capacity: 7,022

Construction
- Groundbreaking: 1989
- Opened: January 1995
- Renovated: 2010–11
- Expanded: 2011
- Cost: 20.5 million Euro
- Architects: Alfred Berger and Sepp Müller

Tenants
- Vienna Capitals (EBEL); EHV Sabres Wien (EWHL)

Steffl Arena (former names: Albert Schultz Eishalle and Erste Bank Arena) is an indoor sporting arena located in Vienna, Austria. The arena has a capacity of 7,022 people and was opened in January 1995. It underwent major renovations in 2010 and 2011 to increase the capacity from 4,500 to over 7,000.

It has three rinks for hockey, figure skating, and public skating and is currently home to the Vienna Capitals ice hockey team. Slovakia's ColosseoEAS installed audio-visual components into all three upgraded halls and can be used with various sports such as ice hockey, handball, volleyball, basketball or tennis.

== See also ==
- List of indoor arenas in Austria
