= 2015–16 Austrian Hockey League season =

2015–16 Erste Bank Eishockey Liga
- League: Erste Bank Eishockey Liga
- Sport: Ice hockey
- Duration: 11 September 2015 – 12 April 2016
- Teams: 12

Regular season
- Season champions: EC Red Bull Salzburg
- Season MVP: Colton Yellow Horn
- Finals champions: EC Red Bull Salzburg
- Runners-up: Orli Znojmo

Austrian Hockey League seasons
- 2014–15 season 2016–17 season

The 2015–16 Austrian Hockey League season began on 11 September 2015 and ended on 12 April 2016. EC Red Bull Salzburg defended their title, beating Orli Znojmo 4–2 in the finals.

== Standings ==
=== Regular season ===
Rank	Team	GP	W	L	OTW	OTL	Goals	Diff.	Pts
1	EC Red Bull Salzburg	44	26	10	5	3	168:112	+56	91
2	EHC Black Wings Linz	44	23	11	6	4	137:107	+30	85
3	Orli Znojmo	44	22	15	4	3	157:116	+41	77
4	Vienna Capitals	44	20	16	6	2	125:102	+23	74
5	HC Bolzano	44	20	15	4	5	120:111	+9	73
6	Dornbirner EC	44	21	15	2	6	126:108	+18	73
7	EC VSV	44	21	16	2	5	120:106	+14	72
8	EC KAC	44	18	16	4	6	139:142	-3	68
9	Fehérvár AV19	44	14	20	6	4	105:123	-18	58
10	Graz 99ers	44	14	22	4	4	94:123	-29	54
11	HC TWK Innsbruck	44	11	26	2	5	98:152	-54	42
12	HDD Olimpija Ljubljana	44	4	32	5	3	85:172	-87	25

=== Placement round ===
Rank	Team	GP	W	L	OTW	OTL	Goals	Diff.	Pts (Bonus)
1	EC Red Bull Salzburg	10	4	5	1	0	40:35	+5	20 (6)
2	Orli Znojmo	10	5	2	0	3	33:36	-3	20 (2)
3	Vienna Capitals	10	5	4	0	1	30:30	+0	17 (1)
4	HC Bolzano	10	4	4	2	0	38:32	+6	16 (0)
5	EHC Black Wings Linz	10	3	5	1	1	32:35	-3	16 (4)
6	Dornbirner EC	10	2	3	3	2	32:37	-5	14 (0)

=== Qualification round ===
Rank	Team	GP	W	L	OTW	OTL	Goals	Diff.	Pts (Bonus)
1	EC VSV	10	8	0	0	2	34:15	+19	32 (6)
2	EC KAC	10	6	3	1	0	43:32	+11	24 (4)
3	HC TWK Innsbruck	10	5	4	1	0	29:24	+5	17 (0)
4	Fehérvár AV19	10	3	5	1	1	31:31	+0	14 (2)
5	Graz 99ers	10	3	5	1	1	22:31	-9	13 (1)
6	HDD Olimpija Ljubljana	10	0	8	1	1	14:40	-26	3 (0)

== Playoffs ==
Quarterfinals
P1	EC Red Bull Salzburg	4
Q2	EC KAC	3
P3	Vienna Capitals	1
Q1	EC VSV	4
P2	Orli Znojmo	4
P6	Dornbirner EC	2
P4	HC Bolzano	2
P5	EHC Black Wings Linz	4

Semifinals
P1	EC Red Bull Salzburg	4
Q1	EC VSV	2
P2	Orli Znojmo	4
P5	EHC Linz	2

Finals
P1	EC Red Bull Salzburg	4
P2	Orli Znojmo	2
