= Brian Lebler =

Austrian ice hockey player

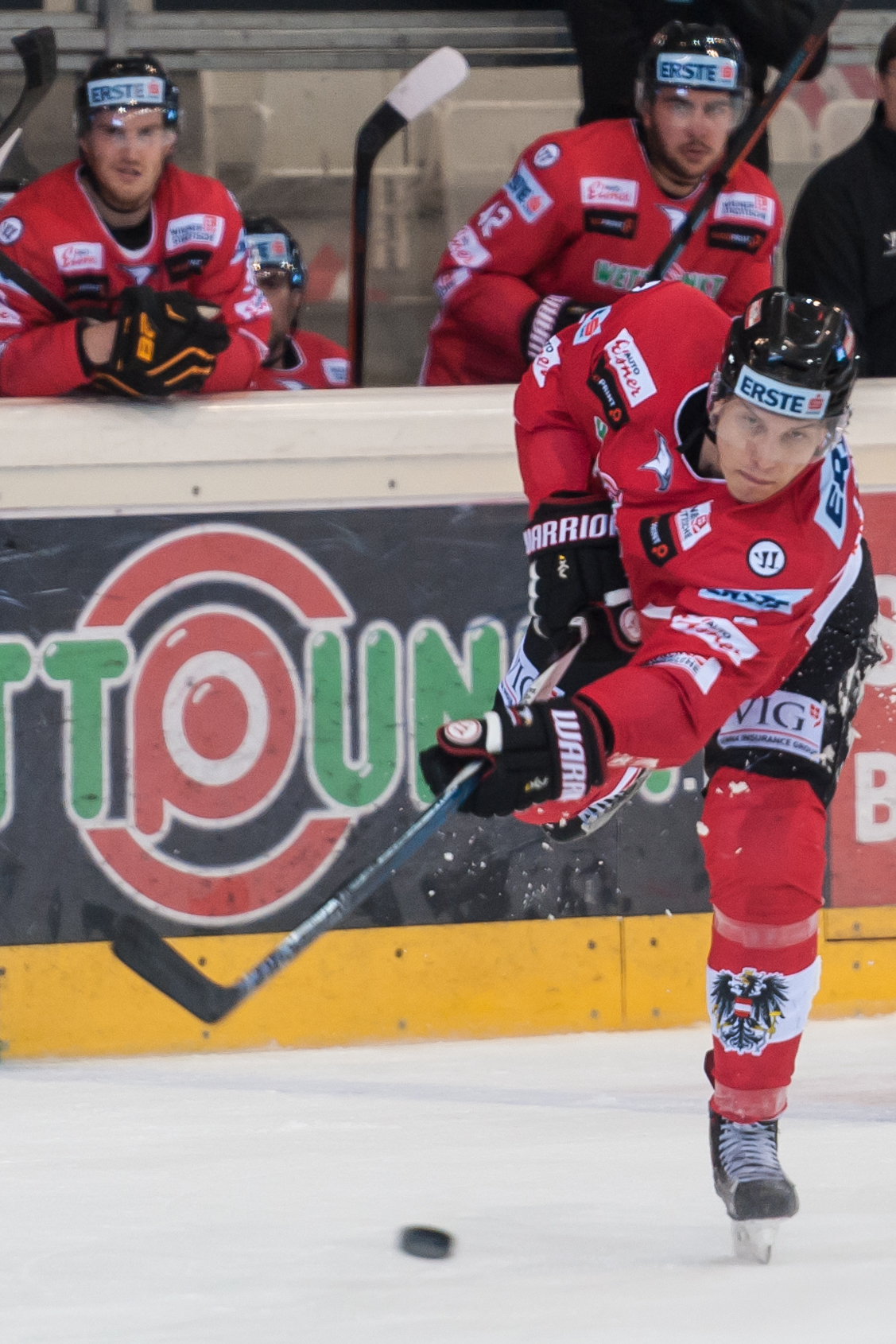
- Born: July 16, 1988 (age 37) Klagenfurt, Austria
- Height: 6 ft 3 in (191 cm)
- Weight: 212 lb (96 kg; 15 st 2 lb)
- Position: Right wing
- Shoots: Left
- ICEHL team Former teams: Black Wings Linz; Syracuse Crunch; ERC Ingolstadt; EC Red Bull Salzburg
- National team: Austria
- NHL draft: Undrafted
- Playing career: 2010–present

Brian Lebler (born July 16, 1988) is an Austrian professional ice hockey right winger, who currently plays for the Steinbach Black Wings Linz of the ICE Hockey League (ICEHL).

== Playing career ==
Lebler began his professional career during the 2010–11 season after playing four years of Division I college hockey with the Michigan Wolverines. He split his first season with the Syracuse Crunch of the American Hockey League and the ECHL's Elmira Jackals. For the 2011–12 season, Lebler joined EHC Black Wings Linz of the Austrian Hockey League (EBEL). He received the Ron Kennedy Trophy as the Most Valuable Player of the 2014-15 EBEL season, after scoring 35 goals and dealing out 18 assists in 54 regular season games. He also made twelve playoff-appearances with six goals and seven assists that season.

On May 27, 2015, Lebler left the Black Wings after four seasons and signed a one-year contract with German club, ERC Ingolstadt of the DEL. He returned to Linz after one season in Germany.

== International play ==
Lebler was named to Team Austria's official 2014 Winter Olympics roster on January 7, 2014.

== Personal ==
Lebler and his wife, Kelsey, had their first child, Blakely, on March 16, 2013. The couple welcomed their second child, Tucker, on March 9, 2015.

== Career statistics ==
=== Regular season and playoffs ===
			Regular season					Playoffs
Season	Team	League	GP	G	A	Pts	PIM	GP	G	A	Pts	PIM
2004–05	Penticton Vees	BCHL	56	21	10	31	58	10	2	3	5	8
2005–06	Penticton Vees	BCHL	54	23	12	35	97	15	3	5	8	33
2006–07	University of Michigan	CCHA	37	7	4	11	34	—	—	—	—	—
2007–08	University of Michigan	CCHA	29	3	5	8	52	—	—	—	—	—
2008–09	University of Michigan	CCHA	37	9	7	16	71	—	—	—	—	—
2009–10	University of Michigan	CCHA	42	14	10	24	59	—	—	—	—	—
2010–11	Syracuse Crunch	AHL	11	0	0	0	22	—	—	—	—	—
2010–11	Elmira Jackals	ECHL	20	2	3	5	45	4	0	1	1	14
2011–12	EHC Black Wings Linz	EBEL	39	11	8	19	81	13	4	7	11	6
2012–13	EHC Black Wings Linz	EBEL	52	31	22	53	79	10	2	7	9	8
2013–14	EHC Black Wings Linz	EBEL	47	27	17	44	78	8	6	4	10	18
2014–15	EHC Black Wings Linz	EBEL	54	35	18	53	64	12	6	7	13	12
2015–16	ERC Ingolstadt	DEL	47	10	15	25	73	2	0	0	0	2
2016–17	EHC Black Wings Linz	EBEL	51	32	25	57	48	5	1	1	2	2
2017–18	EHC Black Wings Linz	EBEL	54	38	27	65	70	12	8	6	14	10
2018–19	EHC Black Wings Linz	EBEL	51	24	17	41	48	6	2	0	2	16
2019–20	EHC Black Wings Linz	EBEL	48	30	29	59	36	3	2	0	2	0
2020–21	Black Wings 1992	ICEHL	50	33	18	51	56	—	—	—	—	—
2021–22	Black Wings Linz	ICEHL	46	25	20	45	48	—	—	—	—	—
2021–22	EC Red Bull Salzburg	ICEHL	2	1	2	3	0	12	6	1	7	6
2022–23	Black Wings Linz	ICEHL	44	19	11	30	51	10	7	2	9	12
2023–24	Black Wings Linz	ICEHL	47	20	26	46	24	5	1	1	2	4
2024–25	Black Wings Linz	ICEHL	48	28	16	44	61	14	5	6	11	10
ICEHL totals			633	354	256	610	744	110	50	42	92	104
DEL totals			47	10	15	25	73	2	0	0	0	2

=== International ===
Year	Team	Event	Result	GP	G	A	Pts	PIM
2014	Austria	OG	10th	4	0	2	2	2
2014	Austria	WC-D1	18th	5	6	3	9	0
2015	Austria	WC	15th	7	2	0	2	4
2016	Austria	WC-D1	20th	5	1	2	3	4
2016	Austria	OGQ	DNQ	3	0	0	0	2
2017	Austria	WC-D1	17th	5	4	1	5	4
2018	Austria	WC	14th	5	1	0	1	2
2021	Austria	OGQ	DNQ	3	5	0	5	2
2022	Austria	WC	11th	7	1	0	1	8
2025	Austria	WC	8th	8	1	2	3	8
Senior totals				52	21	10	31	36
