= János Hári =

Hungarian ice hockey player (born 1992)

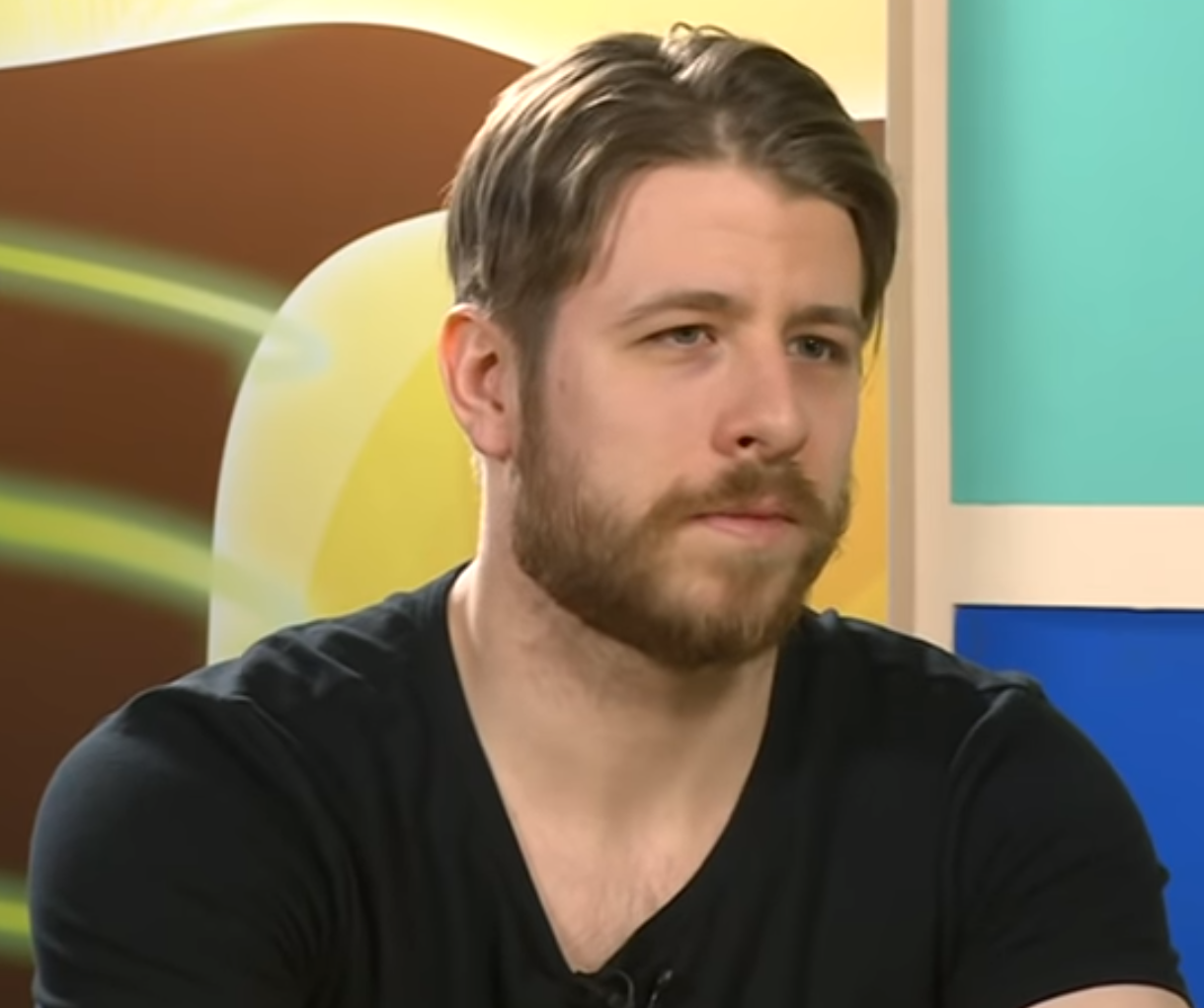
- Born: 3 May 1992 (age 34) Budapest, Hungary
- Height: 5 ft 9 in (175 cm)
- Weight: 170 lb (77 kg; 12 st 2 lb)
- Position: Forward
- Shoots: Left
- ICEHL team Former teams: Fehérvár AV19; HIFK; Leksands IF; Lahti Pelicans; EC Red Bull Salzburg
- National team: Hungary
- NHL draft: Undrafted
- Playing career: 2010–present

János Hári (born 3 May 1992) is a Hungarian professional ice hockey player who is a forward for Fehérvár AV19 of the ICE Hockey League (ICEHL).

== Career statistics ==
=== Regular season and playoffs ===
			Regular season					Playoffs
Season	Team	League	GP	G	A	Pts	PIM	GP	G	A	Pts	PIM
2010–11	Montreal Juniors	QMJHL	23	3	7	10	11	—	—	—	—	—
2010–11	Rouyn-Noranda Huskies	QMJHL	23	1	6	7	8	—	—	—	—	—
2011–12	MoDo Hockey	J20	24	17	24	41	113	8	5	3	8	37
2011–12	MoDo Hockey	SHL	31	5	6	11	33	1	0	0	0	0
2012–13	MoDo Hockey	J20	17	13	18	31	16	—	—	—	—	—
2012–13	MoDo Hockey	SHL	29	0	3	3	2	—	—	—	—	—
2012–13	Asplöven HC	HA	1	0	3	3	2	—	—	—	—	—
2012–13	Djurgårdens IF	HA	14	2	4	6	4	—	—	—	—	—
2013–14	HIFK	Liiga	44	8	11	19	12	1	0	0	0	0
2013–14	HCK	Mestis	3	1	4	5	12	—	—	—	—	—
2014–15	MoDo Hockey	SHL	53	6	15	21	20	4	0	0	0	2
2015–16	Leksands IF	HA	44	10	33	43	26	14	2	9	11	6
2016–17	Leksands IF	SHL	51	5	12	17	14	—	—	—	—	—
2017–18	Fehérvár AV19	EBEL	50	22	24	46	16	—	—	—	—	—
2018–19	Fehérvár AV19	EBEL	53	22	45	67	20	6	1	4	5	2
2019–20	Lahti Pelicans	Liiga	24	2	11	13	14	—	—	—	—	—
2019–20	EC Red Bull Salzburg	EBEL	18	4	12	16	4	—	—	—	—	—
2020–21	Fehérvár AV19	ICEHL	46	15	34	49	28	4	1	1	2	6
2021–22	Fehérvár AV19	ICEHL	36	9	27	36	8	13	8	12	20	2
2022–23	Fehérvár AV19	ICEHL	48	11	22	33	28	6	3	1	4	2
2023–24	Fehérvár AV19	ICEHL	47	19	38	57	12	6	1	5	6	2
2024–25	Fehérvár AV19	ICEHL	48	14	30	44	23	7	0	1	1	2
SHL totals			164	16	36	52	69	11	0	2	2	6
Liiga totals			68	10	22	32	26	1	0	0	0	0
EBEL/ICEHL totals			346	116	232	348	139	42	14	24	38	16

=== International ===
Year	Team	Event	Result	GP	G	A	Pts	PIM
2009	Hungary	U18 (D1)	3rd	5	3	4	7	6
2009	Hungary	U20 (D1)	3rd	3	0	0	0	0
2010	Hungary	U18 (D1)	2nd	5	1	4	5	6
2012	Hungary	U20 (D2A)	3rd	2	0	3	3	2
2012	Hungary	WC D1A	3rd	5	0	1	1	4
2012	Hungary	OGQ	DNQ	3	3	4	7	0
2013	Hungary	WC D1A	3rd	5	1	2	3	2
2014	Hungary	WC D1A	5th	5	0	5	5	0
2015	Hungary	WC D1A	P	5	2	2	4	2
2016	Hungary	OGQ	DNQ	3	1	1	2	2
2017	Hungary	WC D1A	5th	5	1	1	2	4
2018	Hungary	WC D1A	4th	5	1	3	4	0
2019	Hungary	WC D1A	5th	4	1	1	2	27
2020	Hungary	OGQ	FQ	3	4	3	7	12
2021	Hungary	OGQ	DNQ	3	1	1	2	4
2022	Hungary	WC D1A	P	4	1	3	4	0
2023	Hungary	WC	15th	6	0	1	1	2
2024	Hungary	WC D1A	P	5	3	3	6	2
2024	Hungary	OGQ	DNQ	3	2	4	6	0
2025	Hungary	WC	14th	7	1	4	5	0
2026	Hungary	WC	14th	7	1	2	3	2
Junior totals				15	4	11	15	14
Senior totals				81	24	44	68	65
