= Tyler Lewington =

Canadian ice hockey player

- Born: December 5, 1994 (age 31) Edmonton, Alberta, Canada
- Height: 6 ft 2 in (188 cm)
- Weight: 202 lb (92 kg; 14 st 6 lb)
- Position: Defence
- Shoots: Right
- ICEHL team Former teams: EC Red Bull Salzburg; Washington Capitals; Nashville Predators; Boston Bruins
- NHL draft: 204th overall, 2013; Washington Capitals
- Playing career: 2015–present

Tyler Lewington (born December 5, 1994) is a Canadian professional ice hockey defenceman who is currently playing for EC Red Bull Salzburg of the ICE Hockey League (ICEHL). He was drafted 204th overall, in the seventh round of the 2013 NHL entry draft by the Washington Capitals.

== Playing career ==
Lewington played four seasons with the Medicine Hat Tigers of the Western Hockey League (WHL) prior to joining the Capitals' organization. Leading up to the 2013 NHL entry draft, Lewington was ranked 66th overall for North American skaters by the NHL Central Scouting Bureau. While playing with the Tigers, he was drafted 204th overall by the Washington Capitals in the 2013 NHL entry draft. Lewington was named captain of the Tigers for the 2014–15 season and was awarded the team's leadership award.

On March 4, 2015, Lewington signed a three-year, entry-level contract with Washington. Although Lewington had the opportunity to join the Capitals American Hockey League affiliate, the Hershey Bears after the Tigers were eliminated from the WHL playoffs, Lewington needed surgery to repair a shoulder injury. Although Lewington was healed by the time the Capitals 2015 training camp came around, he was assigned to the Hershey Bears to begin the season. Lewington made the Bears opening night roster but before he had a chance to play a game, he was reassigned to their ECHL team on October 15. Lewington spent the season splitting his time playing with the Hershey Bears and the South Carolina Stingrays of the ECHL. The following two seasons Lewington was a steady presence in the AHL, playing in 201 games before making his NHL debut.

Lewington played in 71 games for the Bears during the 2017–18 season. While he played in 71 games, Lewington was suspended twice in March, and once in April. Lewington was re-signed by the Capitals on May 18, 2018 to a two-year, two-way contract.

Lewington attended the Capitals training camp prior to the 2018–19 season. On September 26 he was placed on waivers with the intention of reassigned him to Hershey. After playing in 26 games, Lewington was recalled to the NHL on December 15. On December 22, 2018, he made his NHL debut against the Ottawa Senators. A week later in another game against the Senators, Lewington completed a Gordie Howe hat trick, recording his first NHL goal, assist, and fight in the process. In the same game, fellow rookie defenseman Madison Bowey also scored his first NHL goal, making the two players the first defensemen in Capitals history to score their first NHL goals in the same game. The following day Lewington was returned to Hershey.

After five seasons within the Capitals organization, Lewington left the club as a free agent and agreed to a one-year, two-way contract with the Nashville Predators on October 13, 2020. In the pandemic delayed 2020–21 season, Lewington made two appearances with the Predators registering 1 assist, remaining primarily on the roster as a part of the club's taxi squad.

As a free agent from the Predators, Lewington joined his third NHL organization in signing a one-year, two-way contract with the Boston Bruins on July 28, 2021. Lewington was called up to the Bruins on an emergency basis on January 12, 2022, and made his Bruins debut the following day against the Philadelphia Flyers. During that game, Lewington became the 1,012th player to appear in a game in the 2021–22 season, which broke the record for most players playing in a single season.

As a pending free agent from the Bruins in the off-season, Lewington opted to halt his North American career in agreeing to a one-year contract with Austrian club, EC Red Bull Salzburg of the ICE Hockey League, on June 7, 2022.

== Personal life ==
Lewington was born to Linda and Marshall and grew up in Edmonton with his sister Amanda.

== Career statistics ==
			Regular season					Playoffs
Season	Team	League	GP	G	A	Pts	PIM	GP	G	A	Pts	PIM
2011–12	Medicine Hat Tigers	WHL	44	0	3	3	46	8	0	1	1	2
2012–13	Medicine Hat Tigers	WHL	69	2	24	26	131	8	1	0	1	14
2013–14	Medicine Hat Tigers	WHL	68	7	31	38	121	18	0	3	3	26
2014–15	Medicine Hat Tigers	WHL	69	9	36	45	113	9	1	1	2	10
2015–16	Hershey Bears	AHL	32	3	3	6	89	21	4	1	5	19
2015–16	South Carolina Stingrays	ECHL	14	1	5	6	20	—	—	—	—	—
2016–17	Hershey Bears	AHL	72	4	13	17	142	12	1	3	4	17
2017–18	Hershey Bears	AHL	71	2	9	11	149	—	—	—	—	—
2018–19	Hershey Bears	AHL	65	3	12	15	121	8	0	0	0	20
2018–19	Washington Capitals	NHL	2	1	1	2	7	—	—	—	—	—
2019–20	Washington Capitals	NHL	6	0	0	0	17	—	—	—	—	—
2019–20	Hershey Bears	AHL	43	4	9	13	76	—	—	—	—	—
2020–21	Chicago Wolves	AHL	3	0	0	0	4	—	—	—	—	—
2020–21	Nashville Predators	NHL	2	0	1	1	9	—	—	—	—	—
2021–22	Providence Bruins	AHL	55	2	7	9	66	2	0	0	0	4
2021–22	Boston Bruins	NHL	2	0	0	0	7	—	—	—	—	—
2022–23	EC Red Bull Salzburg	ICEHL	42	5	8	13	47	15	1	1	2	19
2023–24	EC Red Bull Salzburg	ICEHL	43	3	10	13	67	18	0	4	4	18
2024–25	EC Red Bull Salzburg	ICEHL	46	3	10	13	48	13	3	2	5	18
NHL totals			12	1	2	3	40	—	—	—	—	—
