= Clemens Unterweger =

Austrian ice hockey player (born 1992)

- Born: 1 April 1992 (age 34) Lienz, Austria
- Height: 6 ft 0 in (183 cm)
- Weight: 187 lb (85 kg; 13 st 5 lb)
- Position: Defence
- Shoots: Left
- ICEHL team Former teams: EC KAC; Graz 99ers
- National team: Austria
- Playing career: 2012–present

Clemens Unterweger (born 1 April 1992) is an Austrian professional ice hockey player who is a defenceman for EC KAC of the ICE Hockey League (ICEHL).

== International play ==
Unterweger represented the Austria national team at the 2018, 2019, 2022, 2024, and 2025 IIHF World Championship.

== Career statistics ==
=== Regular season and playoffs ===
			Regular season					Playoffs
Season	Team	League	GP	G	A	Pts	PIM	GP	G	A	Pts	PIM
2012–13	Graz 99ers	EBEL	40	0	0	0	2	5	0	0	0	0
2013–14	Graz 99ers	EBEL	2	0	0	0	0	—	—	—	—	—
2013–14	Hokki	Mestis	49	6	11	17	26	12	0	0	0	14
2014–15	Graz 99ers	EBEL	27	1	3	4	6	—	—	—	—	—
2015–16	Graz 99ers	EBEL	47	1	8	9	12	—	—	—	—	—
2016–17	Graz 99ers	EBEL	27	0	3	3	8	—	—	—	—	—
2017–18	Graz 99ers	EBEL	54	6	21	27	16	—	—	—	—	—
2018–19	EC KAC	EBEL	53	5	6	11	12	15	1	0	1	6
2018–19	EC KAC II	AlpsHL	1	0	0	0	0	—	—	—	—	—
2019–20	EC KAC	EBEL	46	2	12	14	14	3	0	0	0	0
2020–21	EC KAC	ICEHL	42	4	11	15	10	15	2	5	7	0
2021–22	EC KAC	ICEHL	46	4	21	25	10	7	1	1	2	4
2022–23	EC KAC	ICEHL	40	3	14	17	14	10	1	2	3	4
2023–24	EC KAC	ICEHL	48	4	21	25	20	17	2	4	6	8
2024–25	EC KAC	ICEHL	41	5	19	24	18	16	0	3	3	14
2025–26	EC KAC	ICEHL	47	6	23	29	16	3	0	1	1	0
ICEHL totals			560	41	162	203	158	91	7	16	23	36

=== International ===
Year	Team	Event	GP	G	A	Pts	PIM
2010	Austria U18	WJC-18 (D1)	5	0	0	0	10
2011	Austria U20	WJC-20 (D1)	5	0	1	1	4
2012	Austria U20	WJC-20 (D1)	5	0	3	3	6
2018	Austria	WC	7	0	2	2	4
2019	Austria	WC	7	0	2	2	2
2021	Austria	OGQ	3	0	0	0	4
2022	Austria	WC	5	0	1	1	4
2024	Austria	WC	7	2	2	4	0
2024	Austria	OGQ	3	0	1	1	2
2025	Austria	WC	8	0	3	3	4
2026	Austria	WC	7	0	2	2	2
Junior totals			15	0	4	4	20
Senior totals			47	2	13	15	22
