= Alexander Pallestrang =

Austrian ice hockey player

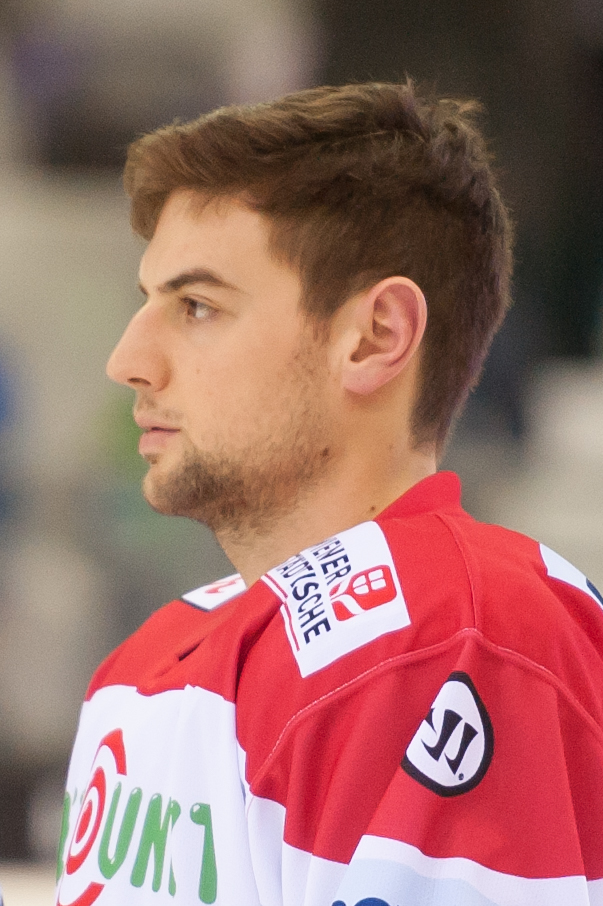
- Born: April 4, 1990 (age 35) Bregenz, Austria
- Height: 6 ft 0 in (183 cm)
- Weight: 198 lb (90 kg; 14 st 2 lb)
- Position: Defence
- Shoots: Left
- ICEHL team Former teams: Pioneers Vorarlberg; EHC Black Wings Linz; EC Red Bull Salzburg
- National team: Austria
- Playing career: 2006–present

Alexander Pallestrang (born April 4, 1990) is an Austrian professional ice hockey player currently Captain for Pioneers Vorarlberg of the ICE Hockey League (ICEHL).

He formerly played with EHC Black Wings Linz and EC Red Bull Salzburg.

Pallestrang participated with the Austrian national team at the 2015 IIHF World Championship.
