= 2024–25 ICE Hockey League season =

2024–25 win2day ICE Hockey League
- League: ICE Hockey League
- Sport: Ice hockey
- Duration: 20 September 2024 – 11 April 2025
- Games: Regular season: 312; Postseason: 44
- Teams: 13

Regular season
- Season champions: EC KAC
- Runners-up: EC Red Bull Salzburg

Playoffs
- Finals champions: EC Red Bull Salzburg
- Runners-up: EC KAC

Austrian Hockey League seasons
- ← 2023–24 2025–26 →

The 2024–25 ICE Hockey League season was the 6th season of the ICE Hockey League and 97th season of professional ice hockey in Austria. The league's title sponsor was the win2day lottery. The regular season ran from 20 September 2024 to 21 February 2025 with EC KAC finishing atop the standings. The postseason ran from 23 February 2025 to 11 April 2025. EC Red Bull Salzburg defeated EC KAC 4 games to 0 for the league championship.

== Teams ==
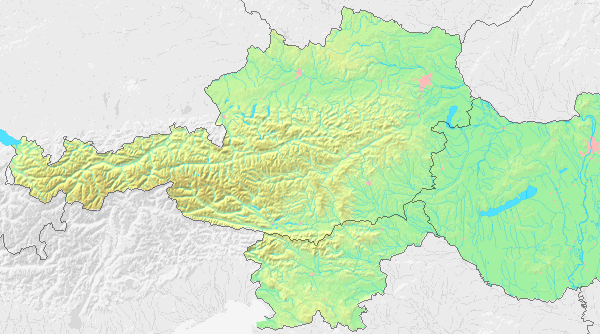
2024–25 ICE Hockey League teams.

| Team | City | Arena | Coach |
|---|---|---|---|
| Asiago Hockey 1935 | (Italy) Asiago | Pala Hodegart | (Italy) Giorgio de Bettin |
| HC Bozen–Bolzano | (Italy) Bolzano | Sparkasse Arena | (Canada) Glen Hanlon |
| HC Pustertal Wölfe | (Italy) Bruneck | Intercable Arena | (Canada) Jason Jaspers |
| Pioneers Vorarlberg | (Austria) Feldkirch | Vorarlberghalle | (Canada) Dylan Stanley |
| Moser Medical Graz99ers | (Austria) Graz | Eisstadion Liebenau | (Austria) Harry Lange |
| HC TWK Innsbruck | (Austria) Innsbruck | TIWAG Arena | (United States) Jordan Smotherman |
| EC KAC | (Austria) Klagenfurt | Eissportzentrum Klagenfurt | (Canada) Kirk Furey |
| Steinbach Black Wings Linz | (Austria) Linz | Linz AG Eisarena | (Austria) Philipp Lukas |
| HK Olimpija | (Slovenia) Ljubljana | Tivoli Hall | (Finland) Antti Karhula, (Slovenia) Andrej Tavželj |
| EC Red Bull Salzburg | (Austria) Salzburg | Eisarena Salzburg | (United States) Oliver David |
| Fehérvár AV19 | (Hungary) Székesfehérvár | AlbaAréna | (Hungary) Dávid Kiss |
| Vienna Capitals | (Austria) Vienna | Steffl Arena | (Canada) Gerry Fleming |
| EC VSV | (Austria) Villach | Villacher Stadthalle | (United States) Tray Tuomie |

== Standings ==
=== Regular season ===
| Pos | Team | Pld | W | OTW | OTL | L | GF | GA | GD | Pts | Qualification |
|---|---|---|---|---|---|---|---|---|---|---|---|
| 1 | EC KAC | 48 | 27 | 5 | 6 | 10 | 183 | 121 | +62 | 97 | Qualified to 2025–26 Champions Hockey League and quarterfinals |
| 2 | EC Red Bull Salzburg | 48 | 27 | 4 | 6 | 11 | 173 | 130 | +43 | 95 | Qualified to 2025–26 Champions Hockey League and quarterfinals |
| 3 | HC Bozen–Bolzano | 48 | 25 | 8 | 2 | 13 | 155 | 113 | +42 | 93 | Qualified to 2025–26 Champions Hockey League and quarterfinals |
| 4 | Steinbach Black Wings Linz | 48 | 24 | 6 | 4 | 14 | 155 | 121 | +34 | 88 | Qualified to quarterfinals |
| 5 | Moser Medical Graz99ers | 48 | 25 | 3 | 5 | 15 | 149 | 121 | +28 | 86 | Qualified to quarterfinals |
| 6 | EC VSV | 48 | 23 | 6 | 5 | 14 | 173 | 143 | +30 | 86 | Qualified to quarterfinals |
| 7 | Fehérvár AV19 | 48 | 27 | 1 | 2 | 18 | 142 | 118 | +24 | 85 | Qualified to eighthfinals |
| 8 | HK Olimpija | 48 | 16 | 9 | 3 | 20 | 129 | 137 | −8 | 69 | Qualified to eighthfinals |
| 9 | HC Pustertal Wölfe | 48 | 15 | 3 | 8 | 22 | 141 | 155 | −14 | 59 | Qualified to eighthfinals |
| 10 | Vienna Capitals | 48 | 15 | 4 | 4 | 25 | 116 | 148 | −32 | 57 | Qualified to eighthfinals |
| 11 | Pioneers Vorarlberg | 48 | 15 | 2 | 4 | 27 | 113 | 151 | −38 | 53 | |
| 12 | Asiago Hockey 1935 | 48 | 8 | 4 | 6 | 30 | 128 | 192 | −64 | 38 | |
| 13 | HC TWK Innsbruck | 48 | 7 | 3 | 3 | 35 | 99 | 206 | −107 | 30 | |

Source: ICE Hockey League
Rules for classification: 1) Points; 2) Head-to-head points.

=== Statistics ===
==== Scoring leaders ====
| Player | Team | Pos | GP | G | A | Pts | PIM |
|---|---|---|---|---|---|---|---|
| (Austria) John Hughes | EC VSV | C/RW | 48 | 12 | 47 | 59 | 14 |
| (Canada) Kevin Hancock | EC VSV | C/LW | 48 | 21 | 32 | 53 | 14 |
| (Canada) Nick Petersen | EC KAC | LW/RW | 44 | 18 | 35 | 53 | 12 |
| (Italy) Matteo Gennaro | Asiago Hockey 1935 | C/LW | 42 | 23 | 28 | 51 | 34 |
| (Canada) Jason Akeson | HC Pustertal Wölfe | LW/RW | 46 | 18 | 32 | 50 | 31 |
| (United States) Josh Passolt | Pioneers Vorarlberg | LW | 47 | 22 | 23 | 45 | 10 |
| (Austria) Benjamin Nissner | EC Red Bull Salzburg | LW | 46 | 21 | 24 | 45 | 34 |
| (Austria) Peter Schneider | EC Red Bull Salzburg | LW/RW | 40 | 19 | 26 | 45 | 18 |
| (Austria) Brian Lebler | Steinbach Black Wings Linz | RW | 48 | 28 | 16 | 44 | 61 |
| (Hungary) János Hári | Fehérvár AV19 | C/LW | 48 | 14 | 30 | 44 | 23 |

==== Leading goaltenders ====
The following goaltenders led the league in goals against average, provided that they have played at least 1/3 of their team's minutes.

| Player | Team | GP | TOI | W | L | GA | SO | SV% | GAA |
|---|---|---|---|---|---|---|---|---|---|
| (Canada) Samuel Harvey | HC Bozen–Bolzano | 37 | 2196 | 24 | 12 | 78 | 7 | .924 | 2.13 |
| (Austria) Atte Tolvanen | EC Red Bull Salzburg | 33 | 1956 | 22 | 10 | 71 | 2 | .917 | 2.18 |
| (Hungary) Dominik Horváth | Fehérvár AV19 | 21 | 1145 | 12 | 6 | 43 | 4 | .922 | 2.25 |
| (Finland) Rasmus Tirronen | Steinbach Black Wings Linz | 38 | 2271 | 22 | 16 | 91 | 2 | .906 | 2.40 |
| (Denmark) Sebastian Dahm | EC KAC | 39 | 2322 | 26 | 13 | 94 | 8 | .911 | 2.43 |

== Playoffs ==
=== Bracket ===
Eighthfinals (best-of-3)
7 | Fehérvár AV19 | 2 | 0 | 3
10 | Vienna Capitals | 1 | 1 | 2
8 | HK Olimpija | 1 | 0 | -
9 | HC Pustertal Wölfe | 2* | 2 | -

Quarterfinals (best-of-7)
1 | EC KAC | 4 | 0 | 6 | 4 | 2 | 3 | -
9 | HC Pustertal Wölfe | 0 | 3 | 2 | 1 | 4 | 1 | -
2 | EC Red Bull Salzburg | 3 | 1 | 2 | 6 | - | - | -
7 | Fehérvár AV19 | 2 | 0 | 0 | 3 | - | - | -
3 | HC Bozen–Bolzano | 4 | 3 | 3 | 3 | 6 | 4 | -
6 | EC VSV | 1 | 4** | 1 | 5 | 1 | 2 | -
4 | Steinbach Black Wings Linz | 6 | 2 | 3** | 4 | 2* | 4* | 3*
5 | Moser Medical Graz99ers | 9 | 3** | 2 | 5* | 1 | 3 | 2

Semifinals (best-of-7)
1 | EC KAC | 2 | 4 | 5 | 1 | 5 | 0 | 2
4 | Steinbach Black Wings Linz | 3*** | 2 | 2 | 3 | 3 | 2 | 0
(Pairings are re-seeded after the first and second round)
2 | EC Red Bull Salzburg | 3 | 3 | 2 | 3** | 4 | - | -
3 | HC Bozen–Bolzano | 1 | 2 | 3* | 2 | 2 | - | -

Championship (best-of-7)
1 | EC KAC | 1 | 0 | 1 | 0 | - | - | -
2 | EC Red Bull Salzburg | 2* | 4 | 3 | 4 | - | - | -

Note: * denotes overtime period(s)
