= Nick Petersen =

Canadian ice hockey player

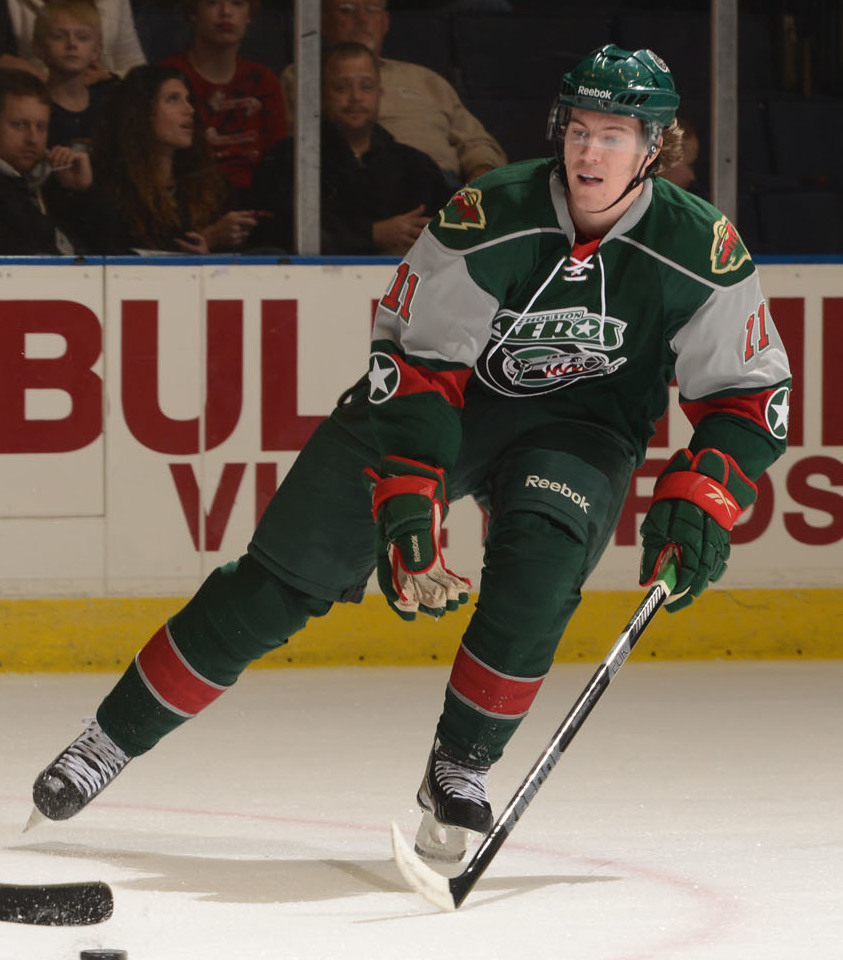
- Petersen with the Houston Aeros in 2013
- Born: May 27, 1989 (age 37) Wakefield, Quebec, Canada
- Height: 6 ft 2 in (188 cm)
- Weight: 186 lb (84 kg; 13 st 4 lb)
- Position: Right wing
- Shoots: Right
- ICEHL team Former teams: EC KAC; WBS Penguins; Houston Aeros; Schwenninger Wild Wings; Iserlohn Roosters; Eisbären Berlin
- NHL draft: 121st overall, 2009; Pittsburgh Penguins
- Playing career: 2010–present

Nick Petersen (born May 27, 1989) is a Canadian professional ice hockey player who is currently playing for EC KAC of the ICE Hockey League (ICEHL). He was selected by the Pittsburgh Penguins in the fourth round (121st overall) of the 2009 NHL entry draft.

== Playing career ==
On May 27, 2010, he was signed by the Pittsburgh Penguins to a three-year entry-level contract.

Upon the final year of his entry-level contract, Petersen was placed on unconditional waivers on September 11, 2012. The termination of the contract and placement of Petersen on unconditional waivers cost the Penguins $125 due to the mutual agreement between the two parties and placed the Penguins' at forty-nine roster players.

On September 28, 2012, Petersen was invited as a free agent to the American Hockey League's Houston Aeros 2012 Training Camp. During training camp he was sent down to their farm team, the Orlando Solar Bears of the ECHL, where on October 11, 2012, he was confirmed on their season starting roster for the 2012–13 season. Petersen split the year between the Solar Bears and the Aeros, contributing with 14 points in 37 games in Houston.

A free agent after the season, Petersen agreed to his first European contract in signing a one-year deal with German club Schwenninger Wild Wings, the newest member of the DEL, on July 11, 2013. After one year with the Schwenningen team, he moved to fellow DEL side Iserlohn Roosters, where he saw the ice in 107 DEL contests, tallying 43 goals and 59 assists during his two-year tenure.

On April 4, 2016, he agreed as a free agent to a two-year deal with fellow German DEL team, Eisbären Berlin. After his two-year tenure with Eisbären Berlin, Petersen left Germany as a free agent to sign a one-year deal in the neighbouring EBEL with EC KAC on May 13, 2018.

== Career statistics ==
			Regular season					Playoffs
Season	Team	League	GP	G	A	Pts	PIM	GP	G	A	Pts	PIM
2007–08	Shawinigan Cataractes	QMJHL	51	11	18	29	38	5	5	1	6	8
2008–09	Shawinigan Cataractes	QMJHL	68	37	53	90	42	21	10	12	22	22
2009–10	Saint John Sea Dogs	QMJHL	59	39	40	79	55	21	7	21	28	14
2010–11	Wilkes-Barre/Scranton Penguins	AHL	23	5	9	14	4	11	2	0	2	6
2010–11	Wheeling Nailers	ECHL	40	24	33	57	30	—	—	—	—	—
2011–12	Wilkes-Barre/Scranton Penguins	AHL	52	11	16	27	25	3	0	0	0	2
2011–12	Wheeling Nailers	ECHL	7	4	5	9	2	—	—	—	—	—
2012–13	Orlando Solar Bears	ECHL	22	12	14	26	20	—	—	—	—	—
2012–13	Houston Aeros	AHL	37	6	8	14	20	—	—	—	—	—
2013–14	Schwenninger Wild Wings	DEL	46	17	16	33	40	—	—	—	—	—
2014–15	Iserlohn Roosters	DEL	51	22	31	53	60	2	0	4	4	2
2015–16	Iserlohn Roosters	DEL	48	21	21	42	16	6	0	3	3	2
2016–17	Eisbären Berlin	DEL	45	13	22	35	36	14	3	5	8	8
2017–18	Eisbären Berlin	DEL	48	16	27	43	42	18	10	12	22	2
2018–19	EC KAC	EBEL	54	26	39	65	41	12	5	10	15	2
2019–20	EC KAC	EBEL	23	4	12	16	10	—	—	—	—	—
2020–21	EC KAC	ICEHL	48	20	30	50	36	15	10	13	23	8
2021–22	EC KAC	ICEHL	18	10	9	19	2	9	2	9	11	2
2022–23	EC KAC	ICEHL	30	10	16	26	20	10	1	4	5	6
2023–24	EC KAC	ICEHL	47	18	31	49	16	17	5	7	12	2
2024–25	EC KAC	ICEHL	44	18	35	53	12	15	6	2	8	13
2025–26	EC KAC	ICEHL	35	15	20	35	14	5	3	5	8	34
AHL totals			112	22	33	55	49	14	2	0	2	8
ICEHL totals			299	121	192	313	151	83	32	50	82	67

== Awards and honours ==
Award	Year
QMJHL
Second All-Star Team	2010
