= Michael Mayr (ice hockey) =

Austrian ice hockey player

- Born: August 20, 1984 (age 40); Linz, AUT
- Height: 6 ft 0 in (183 cm)
- Weight: 201 lb (91 kg; 14 st 5 lb)
- Position: Defence
- Played for: EHC Black Wings Linz
- Playing career: 2001–2014

Michael Mayr (born August 20, 1984 in Linz) is an Austrian former professional ice hockey defenceman who played his entire career with the EHC Black Wings Linz in the Erste Bank Eishockey Liga. He played for his hometown team from 2001 to 2014 totalling 555 games for them in the EBEL.
