= 2023–24 ICE Hockey League season =

2023–24 win2day ICE Hockey League
- League: ICE Hockey League
- Sport: Ice hockey
- Duration: 15 September 2023 – 19 April 2024
- Games: Regular season: 312; Postseason: 46
- Teams: 13

Regular season
- Season champions: EC KAC
- Runners-up: Fehérvár AV19

Playoffs
- Finals champions: EC Red Bull Salzburg
- Runners-up: EC KAC

Austrian Hockey League seasons
- ← 2022–23 2024–25 →

The 2023–24 ICE Hockey League season was the 5th season of the ICE Hockey League and 96th season of professional ice hockey in Austria. The league's title sponsor was the win2day lottery. The regular season ran from 15 September 2023 to 23 February 2024 with EC KAC finishing atop the standings. The postseason ran from 25 February 2024 to 19 April 2024. EC Red Bull Salzburg defeated EC KAC 4 games to 3 for the league championship.

== Teams ==
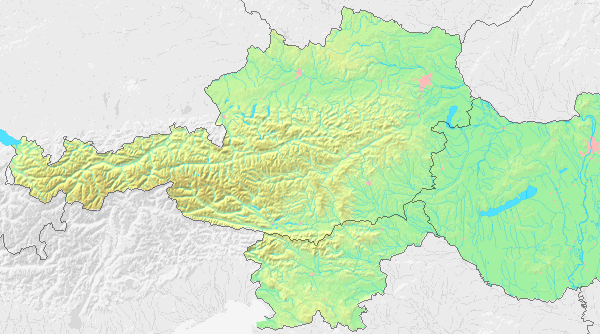
2023–24 ICE Hockey League teams.

Team	City	Arena	Coach
Migross Supermercati Asiago Hockey	(Italy) Asiago	Pala Hodegart	(Italy) Giorgio de Bettin
HCB Südtirol Alperia	(Italy) Bolzano	Sparkasse Arena	(Canada) Glen Hanlon
HC Pustertal Wölfe	(Italy) Bruneck	Intercable Arena	(Canada) Jason Jaspers
Pioneers Vorarlberg	(Austria) Feldkirch	Vorarlberghalle	(Canada) Dylan Stanley
Moser Medical Graz99ers	(Austria) Graz	Eisstadion Liebenau	(Austria) Harry Lange
HC TIWAG Innsbruck - Die Haie	(Austria) Innsbruck	TIWAG Arena	(United States) Jordan Smotherman
EC-KAC	(Austria) Klagenfurt	Eissportzentrum Klagenfurt	(Canada) Kirk Furey
Steinbach Black Wings Linz	(Austria) Linz	Linz AG Eisarena	(Austria) Philipp Lukas
Olimpija Ljubljana	(Slovenia) Ljubljana	Tivoli Hall	(Finland) Antti Karhula, (Slovenia) Andrej Tavželj
EC Red Bull Salzburg	(Austria) Salzburg	Eisarena Salzburg	(United States) Oliver David
Hydro Fehervar AV 19	(Hungary) Székesfehérvár	AlbaAréna	(Hungary) Dávid Kiss
Vienna Capitals	(Austria) Vienna	Steffl Arena	(Canada) Gerry Fleming
EC iDM Wärmepumpen VSV	(Austria) Villach	Villacher Stadthalle	(United States) Tray Tuomie

== Standings ==
=== Regular season ===
Pos	Team	Pld	W	OTW	OTL	L	GF	GA	GD	Pts	Qualification
1	EC KAC	48	30	3	6	9	183	104	+79	102	Qualified to 2024–25 Champions Hockey League and quarterfinals
2	Fehérvár AV19	48	29	2	4	13	161	130	+31	95	Qualified to 2024–25 Champions Hockey League and quarterfinals
3	EC Red Bull Salzburg	48	24	7	4	13	150	111	+39	90	Qualified to 2024–25 Champions Hockey League and quarterfinals
4	HC Bozen–Bolzano	48	24	5	0	19	147	125	+22	82	Qualified to quarterfinals
5	Steinbach Black Wings Linz	48	21	5	8	14	156	122	+34	81	Qualified to quarterfinals
6	EC VSV	48	22	5	4	17	160	139	+21	80	Qualified to quarterfinals
7	HC TWK Innsbruck	48	18	8	7	15	139	132	+7	77	Qualified to eighthfinals
8	HC Pustertal Wölfe	48	20	5	5	18	145	139	+6	75	Qualified to eighthfinals
9	HK Olimpija	48	17	5	5	21	150	157	−7	66	Qualified to eighthfinals
10	Pioneers Vorarlberg	48	18	4	3	23	153	157	−4	65	Qualified to eighthfinals
11	Vienna Capitals	48	9	7	7	25	114	173	−59	48	
12	Asiago Hockey 1935	48	8	5	9	26	121	197	−76	43	
13	Moser Medical Graz99ers	48	6	5	4	33	89	182	−93	32	

Source: ICE Hockey League
Rules for classification: 1) Points; 2) Head-to-head points.

=== Statistics ===
==== Scoring leaders ====
Player	Team	Pos	GP	G	A	Pts	PIM
(Canada) Steven Owre	Pioneers Vorarlberg	C/RW	48	31	31	62	10
(United States) Trevor Gooch	HK Olimpija	C/W	48	24	36	60	20
(Canada) John Hughes	EC VSV	C/RW	45	15	45	60	10
(Canada) Kevin Roy	HC TWK Innsbruck	C/LW	47	25	33	58	14
(Canada) Graham Knott	Steinbach Black Wings Linz	LW/C	45	23	35	58	30
(Hungary) János Hári	Fehérvár AV19	LW/C	47	19	38	57	12
(Netherlands) Guus van Ness	Pioneers Vorarlberg	LW/RW	48	19	33	52	37
(Canada) Shawn St-Amant	Steinbach Black Wings Linz	LW/RW	42	17	33	50	12
(Canada) Nick Petersen	EC KAC	RW/LW	47	18	31	49	16
(Canada) Jason Akeson	HC Pustertal Wölfe	RW/LW	47	12	36	48	10

==== Leading goaltenders ====
The following goaltenders led the league in goals against average, provided that they have played at least 1/3 of their team's minutes.

Player	Team	GP	TOI	W	L	GA	SO	SV%	GAA
(Denmark) Sebastian Dahm	EC KAC	29	1713	22	6	47	3	.932	1.65
(Finland) Rasmus Tirronen	Steinbach Black Wings Linz	36	2178	20	16	76	2	.924	2.09
(Austria) Atte Tolvanen	EC Red Bull Salzburg	32	1900	20	12	67	1	.916	2.12
(Hungary) Dominik Horváth	Fehérvár AV19	21	1152	15	4	44	1	.922	2.29
(Canada) Evan Buitenhuis	HC TWK Innsbruck	44	2656	23	21	110	1	.913	2.49

== Playoffs ==
=== Bracket ===
Eighthfinals (best-of-3)
7	HC TIWAG Innsbruck - Die Haie	3	2	-
10	Pioneers Vorarlberg	6	5	-
8	HC Pustertal Wölfe	3	2	4*
9	Olimpija Ljubljana	0	6	3

Quarterfinals (best-of-7)
1	EC KAC	0	1	7	3	1	5	-
10	Pioneers Vorarlberg	2	0	0	1	6	1	-
2	Fehérvár AV19	3*	3	3	1	5	2	1
8	HC Pustertal Wölfe	2	2	4*	2	3	4	4
3	EC Red Bull Salzburg	4	2	5	3	5	-	-
5	Steinbach Black Wings Linz	0	3	1	2	1	-	-
4	HCB Südtirol Alperia	5	4	6	1	2	-	-
6	EC iDM Warmepumpen VSV	2	2	1	6	1	-	-

Semifinals (best-of-7)
1	EC KAC	7	4	3	5	-	-	-
8	HC Pustertal Wölfe	1	2	1	3	-	-	-
(Pairings are re-seeded after the first and second round)
3	EC Red Bull Salzburg	0	3	4	2	2	4	3*
4	HCB Südtirol Alperia	2	1	3	3	3	1	2

Championship (best-of-7)
1	EC KAC	0	5	4	5	2	4	2
3	EC Red Bull Salzburg	1*	2	2	6*	3*	1	6

Note: * denotes overtime period(s)
