= Pioneers Vorarlberg =

Austrian ice hockey club

- City: Feldkirch, Austria
- League: ICE Hockey League
- Founded: 2022
- Home arena: Vorarlberghalle (capacity: 5,200)
- Colors
- General manager: Pit Gleim
- Head coach: Marko Ojanen
- Website: www.pioneers.hockey

Pioneers Vorarlberg is an Austrian professional ice hockey team in the ICE Hockey League. The team plays their home games in Feldkirch, Vorarlberg, Austria at the Vorarlberghalle. It is the top-level team of VEU Feldkirch.

== History ==
Feldkirch is one of the most traditional ice hockey locations in Austria. VEU Feldkirch first joined the country's top division for the 1951/52 season. Prior to the club's bankruptcy in 2000, the team won the first division championship nine times and won the European Hockey League in 1997–98. From 2000 the club underwent several name changes and competed in various leagues.

In 2022, VEU Feldkich began planning "Team Vorarlberg" in preparation to join the ICE Hockey League, including renovations to the Vorarlberghalle and acquiring players. In June 2022, the team was admitted as a new member of the league, set to begin play in the 2022/2023 season. After finishing at the bottom of the table in the main stage of the league their first season, the club hired Canadian Dylan Stanley as head coach and replaced half the roster going into its second season.

== Players ==
=== Current roster ===
Updated 2 September 2024

No.	Nat	Player	Pos	S/G	Age	Acquired	Birthplace
30	(Italy)	Alex Caffi	G	L	36	2022	Varese, Italy
17	(Canada)	Oliver Cooper	C	L	31	2024	Fredericton, New Brunswick, Canada
22	(Austria)	Luca Erne	W	R	22	2022	Lustenau, Austria
2	(Canada)	Jacob Friend	D	L	29	2024	Bowmanville, Ontario, Canada
19	(Canada)	Brady Gilmour	C	L	27	2024	Cobourg, Ontario, Canada
7	(United States)	David Keefer	RW	R	28	2024	Howell, Michigan, United States
77	(Czech Republic)	Ivan Korecký	D	L	27	2022	Freistadt, Austria
11	(Austria)	Yannik Lebeda	W	L	23	2022	Hohenems, Austria
5	(Sweden)	Jacob Lundegård	D	L	29	2024	Växjö, Sweden
28	(Canada)	Ross MacDougall	D	R	29	2024	St. Stephen, New Brunswick, Canada
71	(Austria)	Kevin Macierzynski (A)	RW	L	34	2022	Feldkirch, Austria
31	(Austria)	David Madlener	G	L	34	2022	Feldkirch, Austria
46	(Austria)	Oskar Maier	W	L	24	2023	Wels, Austria
25	(Austria)	Julian Metzler	W	R	26	2022	Dornbirn, Austria
15	(Austria)	Mark Mussbacher	D	L	23	2023	Feldkirch, Austria
19	(Canada)	Joseph Nardi	LW	L	29	2024	Edmonton, Alberta, Canada
90	(Austria)	Alexander Pallestrang (C)	D	L	36	2022	Bregenz, Austria
12	(United States)	Josh Passolt	LW	L	30	2024	Hayward, Wisconsin, United States
44	(Austria)	Tobias Reinbacher	D	L	24	2022	Dornbirn, Austria
4	(Austria)	Ramón Schnetzer	D	L	30	2024	Feldkirch, Austria
86	(United States)	Lucas Sowder	LW	L	27	2024	Trinity, Florida, United States
33	(Austria)	Aron Summer	D	L	22	2022	Hohenems, Austria
91	(Austria)	Marlon Tschofen	W	R	24	2024	Schruns, Austria
64	(Austria)	Janick Wernicke	C	R	22	2023	Vienna, Austria
51	(Austria)	Daniel Woger	LW	R	38	2023	Bregenz, Austria
