= Unterweger =

Unterweger is a German surname common in Austria. Notable people with the surname include:

- Clemens Unterweger (born 1992), Austrian ice hockey player
- Jack Unterweger (1950–1994), Austrian serial killer
- Lisa Unterweger (born 1995), Austrian cross-country skier
