= Raphael Wolf (ice hockey) =

Austrian ice hockey player

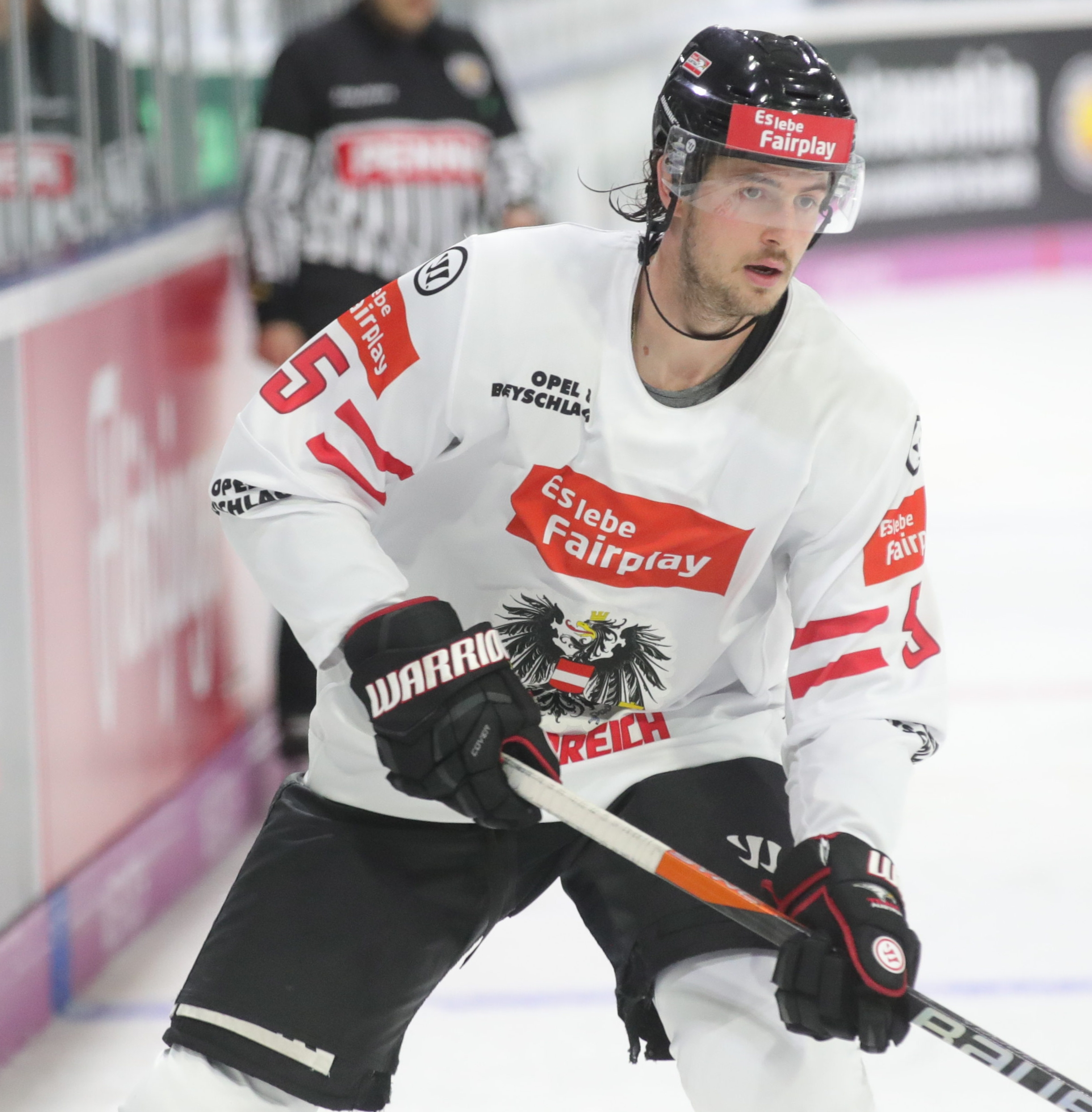
- Wolf with Austria in 2023
- Born: 29 December 1995 (age 30) Salzburg, Austria
- Height: 6 ft 6 in (198 cm)
- Weight: 223 lb (101 kg; 15 st 13 lb)
- Position: Defence
- Shoots: Left
- ICEHL team Former teams: Black Wings Linz; Dornbirn Bulldogs; EC VSV
- National team: Austria
- Playing career: 2015–present

Raphael Wolf (born 29 December 1995) is an Austrian professional ice hockey defenceman for Black Wings Linz in the ICE Hockey League (ICEHL) and the Austrian national team.

Wolf played two seasons with the Dornbirn Bulldogs before leaving as a free agent and signing a one-year contract with fellow EBEL club, EHC Black Wings Linz on 27 May 2019.

He represented Austria at the 2019 IIHF World Championship.
