= David Madlener =

Austrian ice hockey player

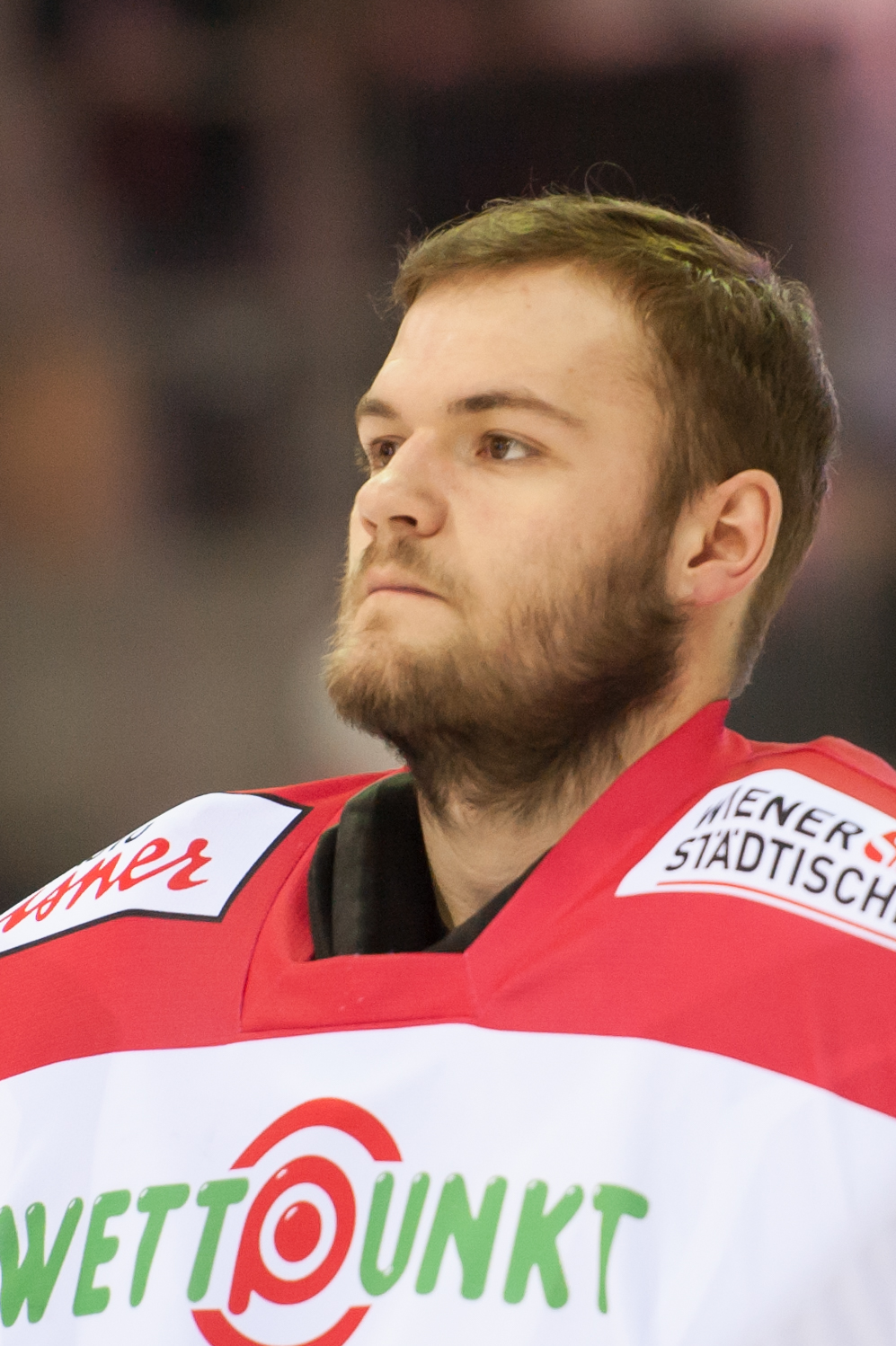
- Born: March 31, 1992 (age 34) Feldkirch, Austria
- Height: 6 ft 2 in (188 cm)
- Weight: 194 lb (88 kg; 13 st 12 lb)
- Position: Goaltender
- Catches: Left
- ICEHL team Former teams: Pioneers Vorarlberg; Dornbirn Bulldogs; EC KAC
- National team: Austria
- Playing career: 2009–present

David Madlener (born March 31, 1992) is an Austrian professional ice hockey goaltender who currently plays for Pioneers Vorarlberg in the ICE Hockey League (ICEHL). He formerly played with fellow Austrian clubs, Dornbirn Bulldogs and EC KAC. He served as the extra backup to the Austrian national team at the 2015 IIHF World Championship. On April 22, 2016, Madlener left Dornbirn and signed a one-year deal with EC KAC.
