= 2022–23 ICE Hockey League season =

2022–23 win2day ICE Hockey League
- League: ICE Hockey League
- Sport: Ice hockey
- Duration: 16 September 2022 – 21 April 2023
- Games: Regular season: 312; Postseason: 44
- Teams: 13

Regular season
- Season champions: HCB Südtirol Alperia
- Runners-up: EC Red Bull Salzburg

Playoffs
- Finals champions: EC Red Bull Salzburg
- Runners-up: HCB Südtirol Alperia

Austrian Hockey League seasons
- ← 2021–22 2023–24 →

The 2022–23 ICE Hockey League season was the 4th season of the ICE Hockey League and 95th season of professional ice hockey in Austria. The league's title sponsor was the win2day lottery. The regular season ran from 16 September 2022 to 26 February 2023 with HCB Südtirol Alperia finishing atop the standings. The postseason ran from 28 February 2023 to 21 April 2023. EC Red Bull Salzburg defeated HCB Südtirol Alperia 4 games to 3 for the league championship.

== Teams ==
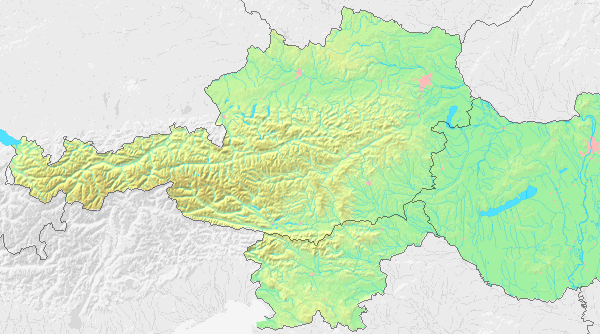
2022–23 ICE Hockey League teams.

Team	City	Arena	Coach
Migross Supermercati Asiago Hockey	(Italy) Asiago	Pala Hodegart	(Italy) Giorgio de Bettin
HCB Südtirol Alperia	(Italy) Bolzano	Sparkasse Arena	(Canada) Glen Hanlon
HC Pustertal Wölfe	(Italy) Bruneck	Intercable Arena	(Canada) Jason Jaspers
Pioneers Vorarlberg	(Austria) Feldkirch	Vorarlberghalle	(Canada) Dylan Stanley
Moser Medical Graz99ers	(Austria) Graz	Eisstadion Liebenau	(Austria) Harry Lange
HC TIWAG Innsbruck - Die Haie	(Austria) Innsbruck	TIWAG Arena	(United States) Jordan Smotherman
EC-KAC	(Austria) Klagenfurt	Eissportzentrum Klagenfurt	(Canada) Kirk Furey
Steinbach Black Wings Linz	(Austria) Linz	Linz AG Eisarena	(Austria) Philipp Lukas
Olimpija Ljubljana	(Slovenia) Ljubljana	Tivoli Hall	(Finland) Antti Karhula, (Slovenia) Andrej Tavželj
EC Red Bull Salzburg	(Austria) Salzburg	Eisarena Salzburg	(United States) Oliver David
Hydro Fehervar AV 19	(Hungary) Székesfehérvár	AlbaAréna	(Hungary) Dávid Kiss
Vienna Capitals	(Austria) Vienna	Steffl Arena	(Canada) Gerry Fleming
EC iDM Wärmepumpen VSV	(Austria) Villach	Villacher Stadthalle	(United States) Tray Tuomie

== Standings ==
=== Regular season ===
Pos	Team	Pld	W	OTW	OTL	L	GF	GA	GD	Pts	Qualification
1	HCB Südtirol Alperia	48	32	5	0	11	175	105	+70	106	Qualified to 2023–24 Champions Hockey League and quarterfinals
2	EC Red Bull Salzburg	48	29	4	3	12	147	97	+50	98	Qualified to 2023–24 Champions Hockey League and quarterfinals
3	HC TIWAG Innsbruck - Die Haie	48	30	1	2	15	186	150	+36	94	Qualified to 2023–24 Champions Hockey League and quarterfinals
4	EC iDM Wärmepumpen VSV	48	27	4	1	16	178	147	+31	90	Qualified to quarterfinals
5	EC KAC	48	19	8	6	15	139	120	+19	79	Qualified to quarterfinals
6	Vienna Capitals	48	22	2	7	17	156	142	+14	77	Qualified to quarterfinals
7	Steinbach Black Wings Linz	48	21	3	4	20	133	131	+2	73	Qualified to eighthfinals
8	Hydro Fehervar AV 19	48	17	4	8	19	123	125	−2	67	Qualified to eighthfinals
9	Migross Supermercati Asiago Hockey	48	18	5	2	23	146	155	−9	66	Qualified to eighthfinals
10	Moser Medical Graz99ers	48	14	5	5	24	106	135	−29	57	Qualified to eighthfinals
11	HC Pustertal Wölfe	48	15	3	5	25	125	136	−11	56	
12	Olimpija Ljubljana	48	11	2	3	32	113	192	−79	40	
13	Pioneers Vorarlberg	48	8	3	3	34	92	184	−92	33	

Source: ICE Hockey League
Rules for classification: 1) Points; 2) Head-to-head points.

=== Statistics ===
==== Scoring leaders ====
Player	Team	Pos	GP	G	A	Pts	PIM
(Canada) Brady Shaw	HC TWK Innsbruck	RW/LW	48	26	43	69	30
(Canada) Adam Helewka	HC TWK Innsbruck	LW/C	43	28	39	67	45
(Canada) Allan McShane	Asiago Hockey 1935	C	48	25	34	59	2
(Canada) Matt Bradley	Vienna Capitals	C	47	24	35	59	108
(Canada) (Italy) Daniel Leavens	HC TWK Innsbruck	RW	42	22	34	56	16
(Canada) (Italy) Giordano Finoro	Asiago Hockey 1935	RW	48	28	26	54	27
(United States) Mitch Hults	HC Bozen-Bolzano	C	48	20	34	54	24
(United States) Max Zimmer	Vienna Capitals	LW	48	28	25	53	34
(Slovenia) Robert Sabolic	EC VSV	RW	48	18	33	51	18
(United States) (Italy) Dustin Gazley	HC Bozen-Bolzano	LW/RW	47	17	31	48	14

==== Leading goaltenders ====
The following goaltenders led the league in goals against average, provided that they have played at least 1/3 of their team's minutes.

Player	Team	GP	TOI	W	L	GA	SO	SV%	GAA
(Austria) David Kickert	EC Red Bull Salzburg	21	1217	13	8	38	2	.916	1.87
(Austria) Atte Tolvanen	EC Red Bull Salzburg	28	1673	20	7	53	3	.921	1.90
(Canada) Samuel Harvey	HC Bozen-Bolzano	34	2013	28	6	69	3	.922	2.06
(Denmark) Sebastian Dahm	EC KAC	45	2730	27	18	101	3	.918	2.22
(Austria) Thomas Höneckl	Steinbach Black Wings Linz	20	1121	12	7	42	1	.920	2.25

== Playoffs ==
=== Bracket ===
Eighthfinals (best-of-3)
7	Steinbach Black Wings Linz	2	6	3
10	Moser Medical Graz99ers	4	2	0
8	Fehérvár AV19	4	5	-
9	Migross Supermercati Asiago Hockey	0	4	-

Quarterfinals (best-of-7)
1	HCB Südtirol Alperia	2	1	1	5	7	1	2*
7	Steinbach Black Wings Linz	0	2	2	1	1	2*	1
2	EC Red Bull Salzburg	3	2	2*	6	-	-	-
8	Fehérvár AV19	2	1	1	1	-	-	-
3	HC TIWAG Innsbruck - Die Haie	4	4	2	2*	1	1	-
6	Vienna Capitals	6	0	5	1	4	5	-
4	EC iDM Warmepumpen VSV	0	4	3	1	2	-	-
5	EC KAC	4	0	4	3	3*	-	-

Semifinals (best-of-7)
1	HCB Südtirol Alperia	2*	3	1	5	3	-	-
6	Vienna Capitals	1	2	2	2	2	-	-
(Pairings are re-seeded after the first and second round)
2	EC Red Bull Salzburg	5	2	5	3	4	-	-
5	EC KAC	1	6	1	1	0	-	-

Championship (best-of-7)
1	HCB Südtirol Alperia	1	0	1	0	4*	4	1
2	EC Red Bull Salzburg	0	1	4	3	3	3	2

Note: * denotes overtime period(s)
