= 2020–21 ICE Hockey League season =

2020–21 bet-at-home ICE Hockey League
- League: ICE Hockey League
- Sport: Ice hockey
- Duration: Regular season: 25 September 2020 – 7 February 2021; Placement round and Qualification round: 12 February – 7 March 2021; Play-offs: 12 March – 25 April 2021 (7th game)
- Games: Regular season: 220; Placement round: 20; Qualification round: 30
- Teams: 11

Regular season
- Winners: HCB Südtirol Alperia
- Runners-up: EC KAC

Placement round
- Winners: HCB Südtirol Alperia
- Runners-up: EC KAC

Play-offs
- Champions: EC KAC
- Runners-up: HCB Südtirol Alperia

Austrian Hockey League seasons
- 2019–20 season 2021–22 season

The 2020–21 ICE Hockey League season began on 25 September 2020. The league's new title sponsor is bet-at-home.com. Due cancelling last season in the quarter-finals, there was no defending champion. On 20 April 2021, EC KAC won the Austrian Hockey Championship for the 32nd time in their history.

== Teams ==
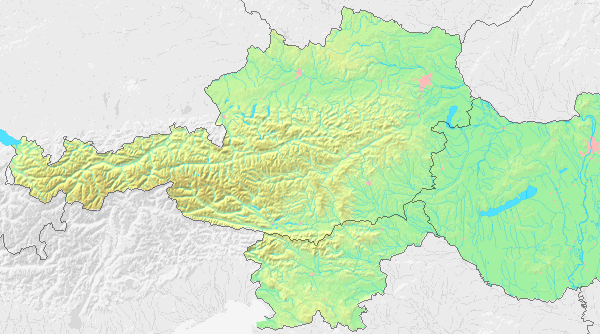
Teams currently participating in the ICEHL.

Team	City	Arena	Capacity
Dornbirn Bulldogs	(Austria) Dornbirn	Messestadion Dornbirn	4,270
Moser Medical Graz 99ers	(Austria) Graz	Merkur-Eisarena	4,126
HC TWK Innsbruck	(Austria) Innsbruck	Tiroler Wasserkraft Arena	3,000
EC KAC	(Austria) Klagenfurt	Stadthalle Klagenfurt	4,945
EC GRAND Immo VSV	(Austria) Villach	Villacher Stadthalle	4,800
EC Red Bull Salzburg	(Austria) Salzburg	Eisarena Salzburg	3,200
Vienna Capitals	(Austria) Vienna	Erste Bank Arena	7,022
Steinbach Black Wings 1992	(Austria) Linz	Keine Sorgen EisArena	4,865
Bratislava Capitals	(Slovakia) Bratislava	Ondrej Nepela Arena	10,055
Hydro Fehérvár AV19	(Hungary) Székesfehérvár	Ifjabb Ocskay Gábor Ice Hall	3,500
HCB Südtirol Alperia	(Italy) Bolzano	Eiswelle	7,200

== Standings ==
=== Regular season ===
Legend: Qualified for 2021–22 Champions Hockey League Qualified for placement round Qualified for qualification round

Rank	Team	GP	W	L	OTW	OTL	GF	GA	GD	Points
1	HCB Südtirol Alperia	40	23	8	4	5	128	78	+50	82
2	EC KAC	40	23	10	3	4	122	80	+42	79
3	Fehérvár AV19	40	20	10	5	5	136	115	+25	75
4	Vienna Capitals	40	17	12	7	4	129	109	+20	69
5	EC Red Bull Salzburg	40	19	13	3	5	120	105	+15	68
6	Dornbirn Bulldogs	40	15	16	6	3	123	112	+11	60
7	Bratislava Capitals	40	14	20	3	3	104	133	-29	51
8	Graz 99ers	40	13	19	4	4	109	135	−26	51
9	HC Innsbruck	40	13	19	3	5	130	140	−10	50
10	EC VSV	40	9	22	5	4	93	135	−42	41
11	Steinbach Black Wings 1992	40	10	27	1	2	81	133	−52	34

=== Placement round ===
Qualified for 2021–22 Champions Hockey League Qualified as higher seed Qualified as lower seed

Rank	Team	GP	W	L	OTW	OTL	GF	GA	GD	Points
1	HCB Südtirol Alperia	8	4	3	1	0	27	23	+4	18 (4)
2	EC KAC	8	4	2	1	1	28	24	+4	17 (2)
3	EC Red Bull Salzburg	8	4	3	1	0	27	22	+5	14 (1)
4	Vienna Capitals	8	2	2	1	3	29	27	+2	11 (0)
5	Fehérvár AV19	8	2	6	0	0	25	40	−15	3 (0)

=== Qualification round ===
Qualified for playoffs Eliminated from playoff contention

Rank	Team	GP	W	L	OTW	OTL	GF	GA	GD	Points
1	Dornbirn Bulldogs	10	3	3	1	3	32	34	-2	22 (8)
2	Bratislava Capitals	10	4	3	1	2	26	26	+0	22 (6)
3	EC VSV	10	5	3	2	0	38	30	+8	20 (1)
4	Steinbach Black Wings 1992	10	6	3	1	0	36	28	+8	20 (0)
5	HC Innsbruck	10	3	5	1	1	30	34	-4	14 (2)
6	Graz 99ers	10	3	7	0	0	22	32	−10	13 (4)

== Playoffs ==
Quarterfinals
PL1	HCB Südtirol Alperia	4
QU2	Bratislava Capitals	1
PL2	EC KAC	4
QU3	EC VSV	1
(Pairings are reseeded after the first round)
PL3	EC Red Bull Salzburg	4
QU1	Dornbirn Bulldogs	2
PL4	Vienna Capitals	4
PL5	Fehérvár AV19	0

Semifinals
PL1	HCB Südtirol Alperia	4
PL4	Vienna Capitals	2
PL2	EC KAC	4
PL3	EC Red Bull Salzburg	1

Finals
PL1	HCB Südtirol Alperia	1
PL2	EC KAC	4
