= Steinbach Black Wings Linz =

- City: Linz, Austria
- League: Austrian National League; 1997–2000; ICE Hockey League; 2000–present
- Founded: 1992
- Home arena: Linz AG Eisarena (Capacity: 4,865)
- Colors: Black, cerulean, orange
- Owner: Dr Peter Nader
- Head coach: Philipp Lukas
- Captain: Brian Lebler
- Website: www.blackwings.at

Franchise history
- 1992–2005: EHC Black Wings Linz
- 2005–2020: EHC LIWEST Black Wings Linz
- 2020–2021: Steinbach Black Wings 1992
- 2021–: Steinbach Black Wings Linz

Championships
- Austrian Champions: 2 (2003, 2012)

The Steinbach Black Wings Linz are an Austrian professional ice hockey team based in Linz, Austria. They currently play in the ICE Hockey League (ICEHL). They play their home games at the Linz AG Eisarena.

== History ==
The EHC Black Wings Linz was founded in 1992. After several years in the Austrian minor leagues 2000 the Black Wings started in the highest league Erste Bank Eishockey Liga. In their inaugural season in 2000–01 the Black Wings reached third place in the regular season before suffering elimination in the playoffs. The season 2001–02 they just lost the finals and finished the season as vice champion. In only their third season, in 2002–03, the Black Wings won the Austrian championship, their first.

After the EHC Black Wings Linz went bankrupt in 2005 they were re-established as EHC LIWEST Black Wings Linz through sponse LIWEST. Since under the new ownership, the Black Wings have had their best result to date in the championship in season 2006–07 as they became vice champion once more. One year later, the Black Wings unexpectedly won the regular season but failed in the playoffs.

In 2012, the Black Wings defeated EC KAC in five games to claim their second EBEL championship in franchise history.

== Honours ==
- ICE Hockey League:

Winners (2): 2002–03, 2011–12
Runners-up (2): 2001–02, 2009–10

== Players and personnel ==
=== Current roster ===
Updated on 2 September 2024

No.	Nat	Player	Pos	S/G	Age	Acquired	Birthplace
9	(Austria)	Niklas Bretschneider	RW	L	26	2020	Vienna, Austria
81	(Canada)	Sean Collins (A)	C	L	37	2023	Saskatoon, Saskatchewan, Canada
66	(Austria)	Stefan Gaffal	F	R	29	2011	Linz, Austria
74	(Austria)	Nico Feldner	C	R	27	2023	Hall in Tirol, Austria
33	(Austria)	Thomas Höneckl	G	L	36	2021	Schwarzach, Austria
49	(Canada)	Graham Knott	LW	L	29	2022	Etobicoke, Ontario, Canada
13	(Austria)	Gerd Kragl (A)	D	L	29	2014	Linz, Austria
37	(Austria)	Andreas Kristler	LW	L	36	2017	Lienz, Austria
7	(Austria)	Brian Lebler (C)	RW	L	38	2016	Klagenfurt, Austria
92	(Austria)	Lorenz Lindner	D	R	23	2023	Spittal an der Drau, Austria
86	(Austria)	Jakob Mitsch	F	L	27	2020	Graz, Austria
3	(Canada)	Greg Moro	D	R	30	2024	Edmonton, Alberta, Canada
14	(Austria)	Henrik Neubauer	RW	R	29	2024	Sunne, Sweden
80	(Austria)	Julian Pusnik	C	L	26	2019	Villach, Austria
20	(Austria)	Kilian Rappold	W	R	24	2022	Graz, Austria
45	(Austria)	Martin Reder	G	L	21	2024	Wels, Austria
47	(United States)	Logan Roe	D	L	34	2022	Cape Coral, Florida, United States
9	(Austria)	Emil Romig	LW	L	33	2021	Vienna, Austria
39	(United States)	Ian Scheid	D	R	31	2024	Coon Rapids, Minnesota, United States
27	(Canada)	Shawn St-Amant	RW	R	29	2022	Le Gardeur, Quebec, Canada
11	(Canada)	Brodi Stuart	LW	L	26	2022	Langley, British Columbia, Canada
23	(Austria)	Patrick Söllinger	D	L	22	2021	Linz, Austria
96	(Austria)	Christoph Tialler	D	R	23	2024	St. Veit an der Glan, Austria
32	(Finland)	Rasmus Tirronen	G	L	35	2022	Espoo, Finland
15	(Austria)	Marcel Witting	RW	L	30	2024	Hall in Tirol, Austria
5	(Austria)	Raphael Wolf	D	L	30	2019	Salzburg, Austria
46	(Austria)	Niklas Würschl	D	R	27	2023	Klagenfurt, Austria

=== Head coaches ===
- Stanislav Barda, 2001–04
- Kurt Harand, 2004–06
- Mike Zettel, 2006
- Bill Stewart, 2006
- Jim Boni, 2007–09
- Kim Collins, 2009–11
- Rob Daum, 2011–17
- Troy Ward, 2017–19
- Tom Rowe, 2019–20
- Pierre Beaulieu, 2020–21
- Dan Ceman, 2021–22
- Philipp Lukas, 2022–present

== Franchise records and leaders ==
=== Single season ===
Goals: 38 Brian Lebler (2017–18)
Assists: 47 Corey Locke (2017–18)
Points: 72 Rob Shearer (2006–07)
Penalty Minutes: 151 Reid Simonton (2003–04)

=== Career ===
Career Goals: 198 Brian Lebler
Career Assists: 300 Philipp Lukas
Career Points: 457 Philipp Lukas
Career Penalty Minutes: 885 Philipp Lukas
Career Games: 790 Philipp Lukas

== Arena data ==
The home arena of the Black Wings is the Linz AG Eisarena. It was built in 1986 and was renovated at least two times since that. In 2014 a new stand has been added, increasing its capacity to 4,865 people.

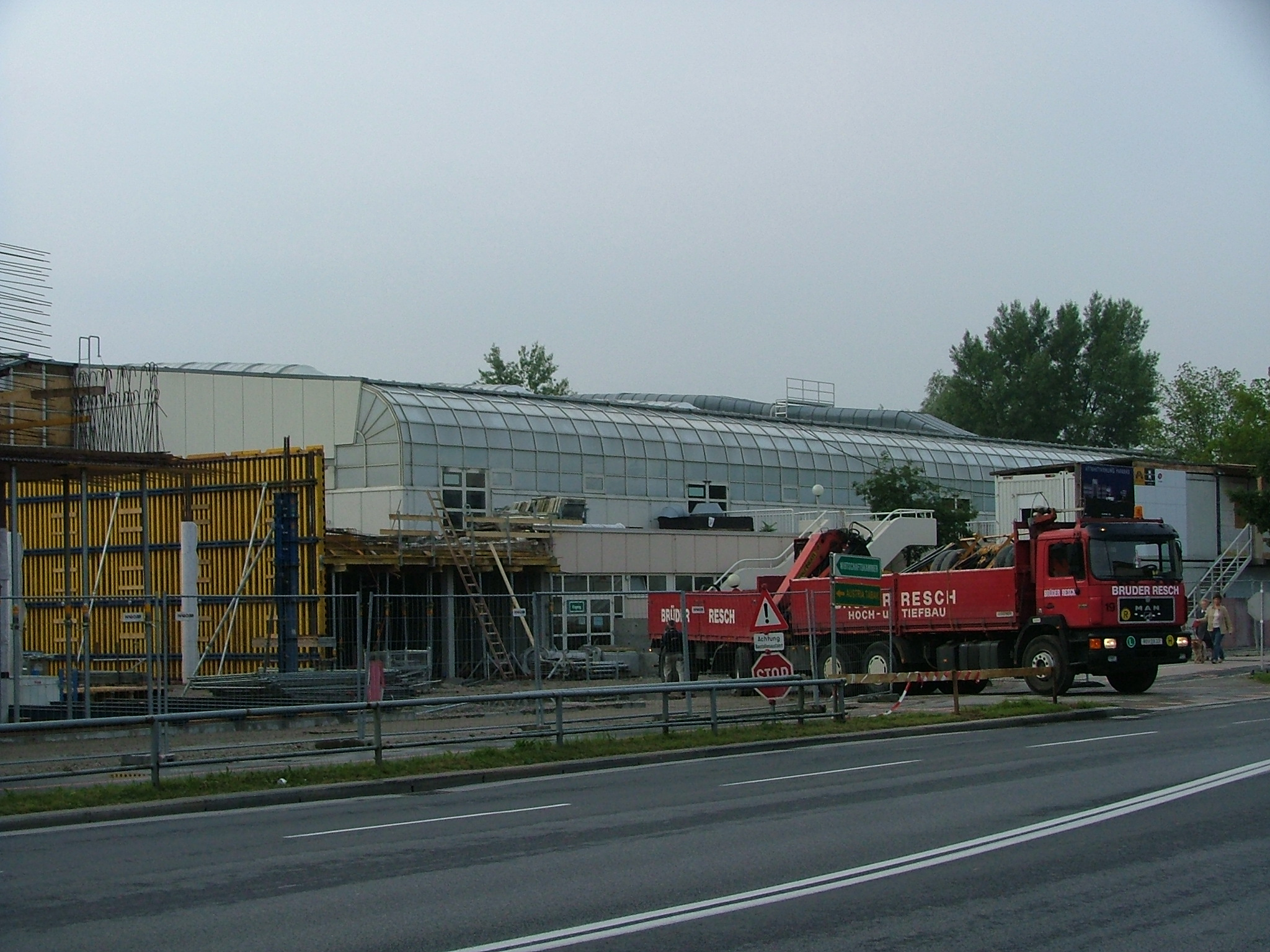
Keine Sorgen Ice Arena Linz

=== Average of attendances ===
- 2003–04: 3,712 visitors per home game
- 2004–05: 3,068 visitors per home game
- 2005–06: 3,125 visitors per home game
- 2006–07: 2,707 visitors per home game
- 2007–08: 2,615 visitors per home game
- 2008–09: 2,584 visitors per home game
- 2009–10: 2,676 visitors per home game
- ...
- 2015–16: 4,642 visitors per home game
- 2016–17: 4,679 visitors per home game
- 2017–18: 4,709 visitors per home game

== Fanclubs ==
The club have four official fanclubs: Stahlhart Linz, Overtime, Powerplay Enns and bully:absolut. In 2007 they consolidated and founded the head club Wings United what makes it easier to organize trips to away games and several events. The head club ended their work in 2013. In 2025 the organized again under the same name, with new persons in charge.
