= Philipp Lukas =

Austrian ice hockey player

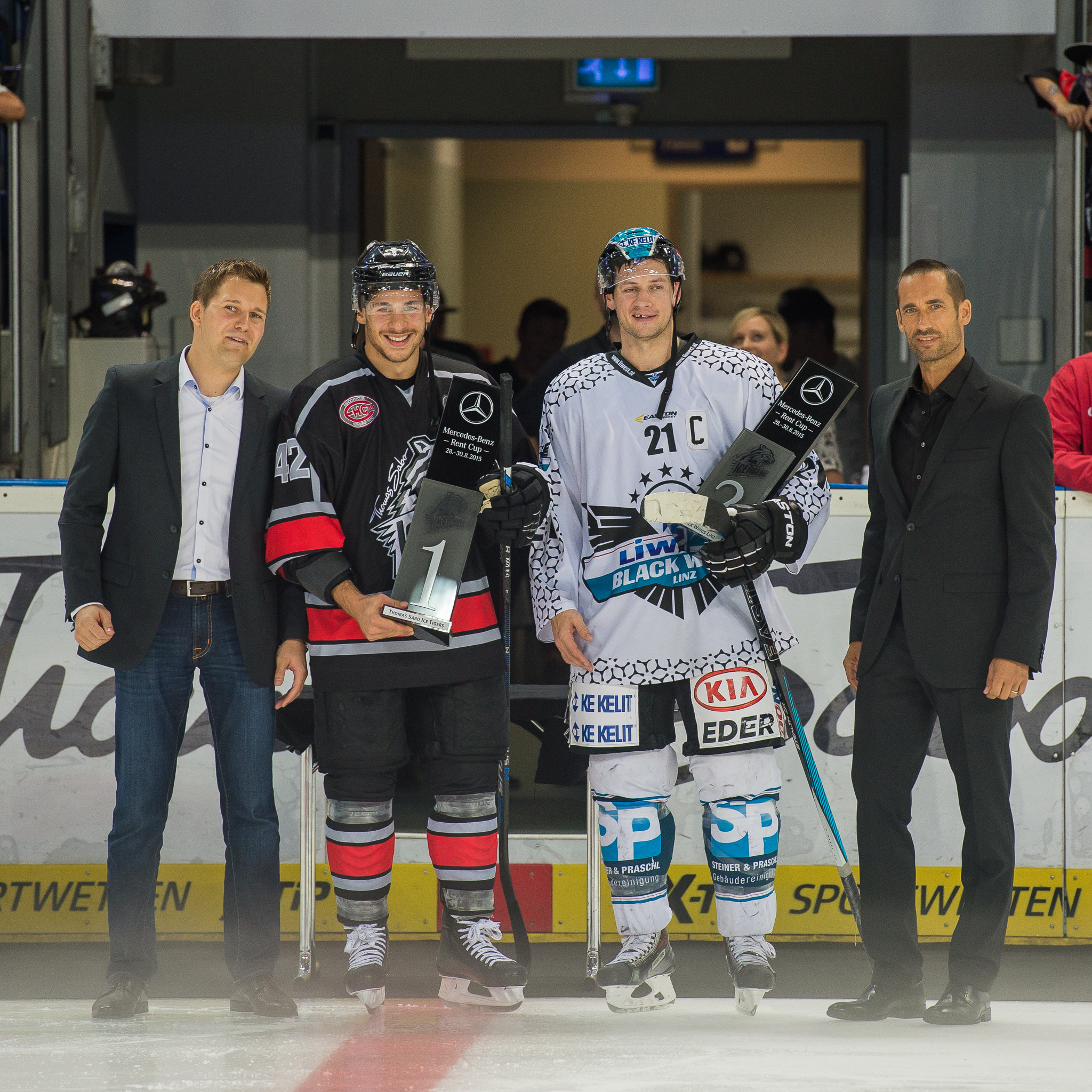
- Born: December 4, 1979 (age 46) Vienna, Austria
- Height: 5 ft 10 in (178 cm)
- Weight: 190 lb (86 kg; 13 st 8 lb)
- Position: Forward
- Shot: Right
- Played for: Wiener EV; VEU Feldkirch; EHC Black Wings Linz
- National team: Austria
- Playing career: 1996–2018

Philipp Lukas (born December 4, 1979) is an Austrian former professional ice hockey player and current Head Coach of Black Wings Linz of the ICE Hockey League (ICEHL). He formerly Captained the EHC Black Wings Linz of the then Austrian Hockey League (EBEL) for 10 seasons.

Lukas was a long-time member of the Austria men's national ice hockey team who has participated at the 2000, 2001, 2002, 2004, 2007, and 2011 IIHF World Championships.

He is the brother of ice hockey player Robert Lukas. The two played extensively together through their career with the Black Wings.
