= Kirk Furey =

Canadian retired ice hockey defenceman (born 1976)

- Born: January 28, 1976 (age 50) Glace Bay, Nova Scotia, Canada
- Height: 5 ft 11 in (180 cm)
- Weight: 200 lb (91 kg; 14 st 4 lb)
- Position: Defence
- Shot: Left
- Played for: Philadelphia Phantoms; EC Kassel Huskies; Iserlohn Roosters; EC KAC
- NHL draft: Undrafted
- Playing career: 2001–2015

Kirk Furey (born January 28, 1976) is a Canadian former professional ice hockey defenceman who is head coach of EC KAC of the ICE Hockey League.

== Playing career ==
After three years in the Ontario Hockey League (OHL) with the Owen Sound Platers, Furey played a year with the Cape Breton Islanders of the Maritime Junior Hockey League before attending Acadia University where he starred with the Acadia Axemen. In his rookie year at Acadia in 1997–98, the Axemen reached the national final, only to lose to the UNB Varsity Reds. In 2001, Furey won a silver medal with the Canadian national team at the 2001 Winter Universiade in Zakopane, Poland.

Furey turned professional in 2001 and spent the next three seasons dividing his time between the ECHL's Atlantic City Boardwalk Bullies and the American Hockey League's (AHL) Philadelphia Phantoms. In 2003, he helped the Boardwalk Bullies capture the Kelly Cup as ECHL champions. The Bullies defeated the Columbia Inferno in five games in the best-of-seven series. Furey finished tied for second in playoff scoring among defencemen with a goal and 10 assists. His 10 assists were the most by a defenseman.

In 2004, Furey's hockey career took him to Europe. He played for the Kassel Huskies of the Deutsche Eishockey Liga (DEL) in Germany and later the Iserlohn Roosters from 2005 to 2007. He played the last eight years of his career with EC KAC of the Erste Bank Eishockey Liga (EBEL) in Austria, winning the championship in 2009 and 2013. He retired after the 2014–15 season.

== Coaching career ==
After retiring in 2015, Furey remained with EC KAC and was named assistant coach of the team. He joined the coaching staff of the club's youth ranks in April 2016.

== Career statistics ==
			Regular season					Playoffs
Season	Team	League	GP	G	A	Pts	PIM	GP	G	A	Pts	PIM
1993–94	Owen Sound Platers	OHL	10	0	1	1	2	—	—	—	—	—
1994–95	Owen Sound Platers	OHL	34	1	1	2	14	—	—	—	—	—
1995–96	Owen Sound Platers	OHL	4	0	2	2	4	—	—	—	—	—
1998–99	Acadia University	CIAU	26	8	10	18	38	—	—	—	—	—
1999–2000	Acadia University	CIAU	23	3	7	10	24	—	—	—	—	—
2000–01	Acadia University	CIAU	20	1	9	10	26	—	—	—	—	—
2001–02	Atlantic City Boardwalk Bullies	ECHL	64	5	13	18	67	12	2	6	8	29
2002–03	Atlantic City Boardwalk Bullies	ECHL	44	4	25	29	70	17	1	10	11	8
2002–03	Philadelphia Phantoms	AHL	31	0	7	7	17	—	—	—	—	—
2003–04	Atlantic City Boardwalk Bullies	ECHL	11	0	10	10	31	—	—	—	—	—
2003–04	Philadelphia Phantoms	AHL	63	9	21	30	60	6	0	1	1	4
2004–06	Kassel Huskies	DEL	51	12	13	25	77	7	2	1	3	16
2005–06	Iserlohn Roosters	DEL	48	8	14	22	100	—	—	—	—	—
2006–07	Iserlohn Roosters	DEL	50	7	20	27	121	—	—	—	—	—
2007–08	Klagenfurter AC	EBEL	45	8	15	23	111	3	0	0	0	4
2008–09	Klagenfurter AC	EBEL	52	7	28	35	42	17	1	9	10	36
2009–10	Klagenfurter AC	EBEL	53	8	23	31	122	7	1	1	2	14
2010–11	Klagenfurter AC	EBEL	54	9	37	46	93	15	1	13	14	12
2011–12	Klagenfurter AC	EBEL	47	3	27	30	34	11	0	6	6	6
2012–13	Klagenfurter AC	EBEL	54	7	14	21	92	15	0	3	3	10
2013–14	Klagenfurter AC	EBEL	52	2	15	17	43	—	—	—	—	—
2014–15	Klagenfurter AC	EBEL	54	5	15	20	30	9	0	3	3	8
AHL totals			94	9	28	37	77	6	0	1	1	4
DEL totals			149	27	47	74	298	7	2	1	3	16
EBEL totals			411	49	174	223	567	77	3	35	38	90
