= EC Red Bull Salzburg =

Red Bull Salzburg
- Nickname: Red Bulls
- City: Salzburg, Austria
- League: Austrian National League; 2001–2004; ICE Hockey League; 2004–present
- Founded: 1977; 2000 (rebranded as Red Bull Salzburg)
- Home arena: Eisarena Salzburg (Capacity: 3,200)
- Colors
- Owners: Theierl Rudolf; Red Bull GmbH
- General manager: Stefan Wagner
- Head coach: Oliver David
- Affiliates: Red Bull Hockey Juniors
- Website: EC Red Bull Salzburg

Franchise history
- 1977–1988: HC Salzburg
- 1988-1995: EC Morzg Salzburg
- 1995–2000: Kaindl EC Salzburg
- 2000–2005: EC The Red Bulls Salzburg
- 2005–present: EC Red Bull Salzburg

Championships
- Austrian Champions: 12 (2007, 2008, 2010, 2011, 2014, 2015, 2016, 2018, 2022, 2023, 2024, 2025)

Eishockeyclub Red Bull Salzburg, also known as EC Red Bull Salzburg, is a professional ice hockey team based in Salzburg, Austria, that plays in the ICE Hockey League. The club plays their home games at the Eisarena Salzburg.

== History ==
In their first season, 1977–78, HC Salzburg took third place in the first division. In 1988, the Salzburg ice hockey club, now known as Salzburg EC, failed to take its first Bundesliga championship, and its ailing economic situation eventually saw the relegation of SEC from the first division. Notable players in this period (1977–1988) include Rick Cunningham, Roger Lamoureux, Viktor Shalimov, Sergei Kapustin, Greg Holst, and Peter Znenahlik.

EC Salzburg was founded in 1995 by the merger of two small clubs EC Morzg and EC Tiefenbach. The EC Morzg originally arose after the bankruptcy of Salzburg EC in 1988 as a refuge for the youth players. Shortly after the foundation, the company Kaindl presented the club with its first major sponsor and the club was renamed to Kaindl EC Salzburg. From the beginning of 2000, energy drink manufacturer Red Bull became the team's major sponsor and the club again changed names to represent EC The Red Bulls Salzburg. It was later transitioned to EC Red Bull Salzburg in 2005.

=== 2000–04 ===
With the addition of new players such as Sheldon Moser and Brian McCarthy, the Red Bulls became champions of the Oberliga in the 2000–01 season. Upon reaching the championship of the Austrian National League, the club earned promotion to the Bundesliga for the first time in 16 years.

=== 2004–06 ===
The team struggled upon promotion, finishing at seventh and last place in the preliminary rounds of the 2004 season. In the second year following promotion, the Red Bulls found themselves in the final of the Erste Bank Ice Hockey League. In the end, however, they lost to VSV, taking the runner-up spot in the sixth game of the best-of-seven series.

=== 2006–07 ===
During a regular season contested by eight teams, Salzburg lost only one out of 28 home games, earning Salzburg a spot in the play-offs. Salzburg beat the Vienna Capitals in the semi-final, and went on to win the league final versus Villach, sealing Salzburg's first ever Austrian ice hockey championship with a score of 4:1 on wins (best of seven), led by Swedish coach Hardy Nilsson who subsequently retired from active coaching.

=== 2007–08 ===
For their fourth season in the Erste Bank Ice Hockey League, Salzburg were joined by new head coach and sporting director Pierre Pagé as well as a number of new international coaches. In addition to non-playing staff, future captain Stuart Mercer was drafted by the Red Bulls following a home video on YouTube of him demonstrating 'Phil Harrison-esque tekkers' at Hutton Grammar School being seen by the club. On 25 September 2007, in preparation for the new season, Salzburg played an exhibition match against National Hockey League team, the Los Angeles Kings, losing 7–6. In his first few months, Pagé helped set up the International Ice Hockey Development Model (IIDM), laying the foundations for the development of up-and-coming junior players, as well as integrating more youth players into the Salzburg 1st division team.

The Red Bulls began the newly introduced intermediate round in third place, later dropping to fourth. The Red Bulls went on to beat Villach in the quarter-final, and Vienna Capitals in the semi-final. The final against Slovenian club Olimpija Ljubljana took six games and ended with the Red Bulls winning the title to become repeat champions.

=== 2008–09 ===
Salzburg had the youngest team in the Erste Bank Eishockey Liga at an average age of 23. The Red Bulls lost in the final to EC KAC, breaking their streak as reigning champions. Team Captain Thomas Koch was awarded Most Valuable Player for this season. The Salzburg farm team was knocked out of the quarter-final of the Österreichische Nationalliga by EK Zeller Eisbären.

=== 2009–10 ===
During the season, 47 Salzburg players contributed to the team. The Red Bulls started the season by winning their invitational tournament, the Red Bulls Salute with competition against teams from other top European Leagues. In January 2010 Salzburg also won their third Continental Cup, beating teams from Latvia and France. The club also went on to win the Erste Bank Eishockey Liga, as well as the club's junior teams winning at the U-20 and U-17 levels. The Salzburg farm team was knocked out in the semi-finals of the Österreichische Nationalliga by Dornbirn.

== Honours ==
- Austrian Hockey League:
  - Winners (11): 2007, 2008, 2010, 2011, 2014*, 2015, 2016, 2018*, 2022, 2023, 2024
- Continental Cup:
  - Winners (1): 2010
- European Trophy:
  - Winners (1): 2011

== Players ==
=== Current roster ===
Updated 9 August 2026.

| No. | Nat | Player | Pos | S/G | Age | Acquired | Birthplace |
|---|---|---|---|---|---|---|---|
| 16 | (Austria) | Luca Auer | F | L | 22 | 2021 | Graz, Austria |
| 89 | (Austria) | Florian Baltram | C | L | 29 | 2015 | Vienna, Austria |
| 8 | (Austria) | Mathias Böhm | F | L | 23 | 2025 | Klosterneuburg, Austria |
| 77 | (Canada) | Adam Brooks | C | L | 30 | 2026 | Winnipeg, Manitoba Canada |
| 44 | (Canada) | Olivier Galipeau | D | L | 29 | 2026 | Montréal, Québec Canada |
| 26 | (Austria) | Peter Hochkofler | RW | R | 31 | 2014 | Bolzano, Italy |
| 95 | (Austria) | Lukas Hörl | D | R | 23 | 2021 | Salzburg, Austria |
| 96 | (Austria) | Mario Huber | RW | R | 30 | 2017 | Innsbruck, Austria |
| 62 | (Canada) | Wyatt Kalynuk | D | L | 29 | 2026 | Brandon, Manitoba, Canada |
| 30 | (Austria) | David Kickert | G | R | 32 | 2022 | Korneuburg, Austria |
| 80 | (Austria) | Nikolaus Kraus | RW | L | 29 | 2024 | Vienna, Austria |
| 6 | (United States) | Cole Krygier | D | L | 26 | 2026 | Orlando, Florida, United States |
| 6 | (Canada) | Jayden Lee | D | R | 25 | 2026 | North Vancouver, British Columbia, Canada |
| 2 | (Canada) | Tyler Lewington | D | R | 31 | 2022 | Edmonton, Alberta, Canada |
| 4 | (Canada) | Nash Nienhuis | D | L | 26 | 2024 | Sarnia, Ontario, Canada |
| 70 | (Austria) | Benjamin Nissner | LW | L | 28 | 2021 | Vienna, Austria |
| 62 | (Canada) | Nick Poisson | C | L | 24 | 2026 | Vancouver, British Columbia, Canada |
| 12 | (Austria) | Michael Raffl | LW | L | 37 | 2025 | Villach, Austria |
| 5 | (Austria) | Thomas Raffl | LW | L | 40 | 2016 | Villach, Austria |
| 22 | (Canada) | Dennis Robertson | D | L | 35 | 2022 | Fort St. John, British Columbia, Canada |
| 3 | (Austria) | Peter Schneider | RW | R | 35 | 2021 | Klosterneuburg, Austria |
| 23 | (Canada) | Devante Stephens | D | L | 29 | 2025 | White Rock, British Columbia, Canada |
| 48 | (Austria) | Lucas Thaler | C | R | 24 | 2021 | Villach, Austria |
| 35 | (Austria) | Atte Tolvanen | G | L | 31 | 2021 | Vihti, Finland |
| 9 | (Austria) | Ali Wukovits | C | L | 30 | 2021 | Vienna, Austria |
| 7 | (Austria) | Maximilian Wurzer | F | L | 22 | 2025 | Zell am See, Austria |

=== Notable alumni ===
- Greger Artursson
- Josh Green
- Martin Ulrich
- Darryl Bootland
- Colton Yellow Horn
- Jay Pandolfo
- Marty Reasoner
- Ric Jackman
- Derick Brassard
- Alex Auld

== See also ==
- FC Red Bull Salzburg, a football club
