= Linz AG Eisarena =

Indoor ice hockey rink in Linz, Austria

Coordinates: 48°18′47″N 14°17′50″E

Linz AG EisArena
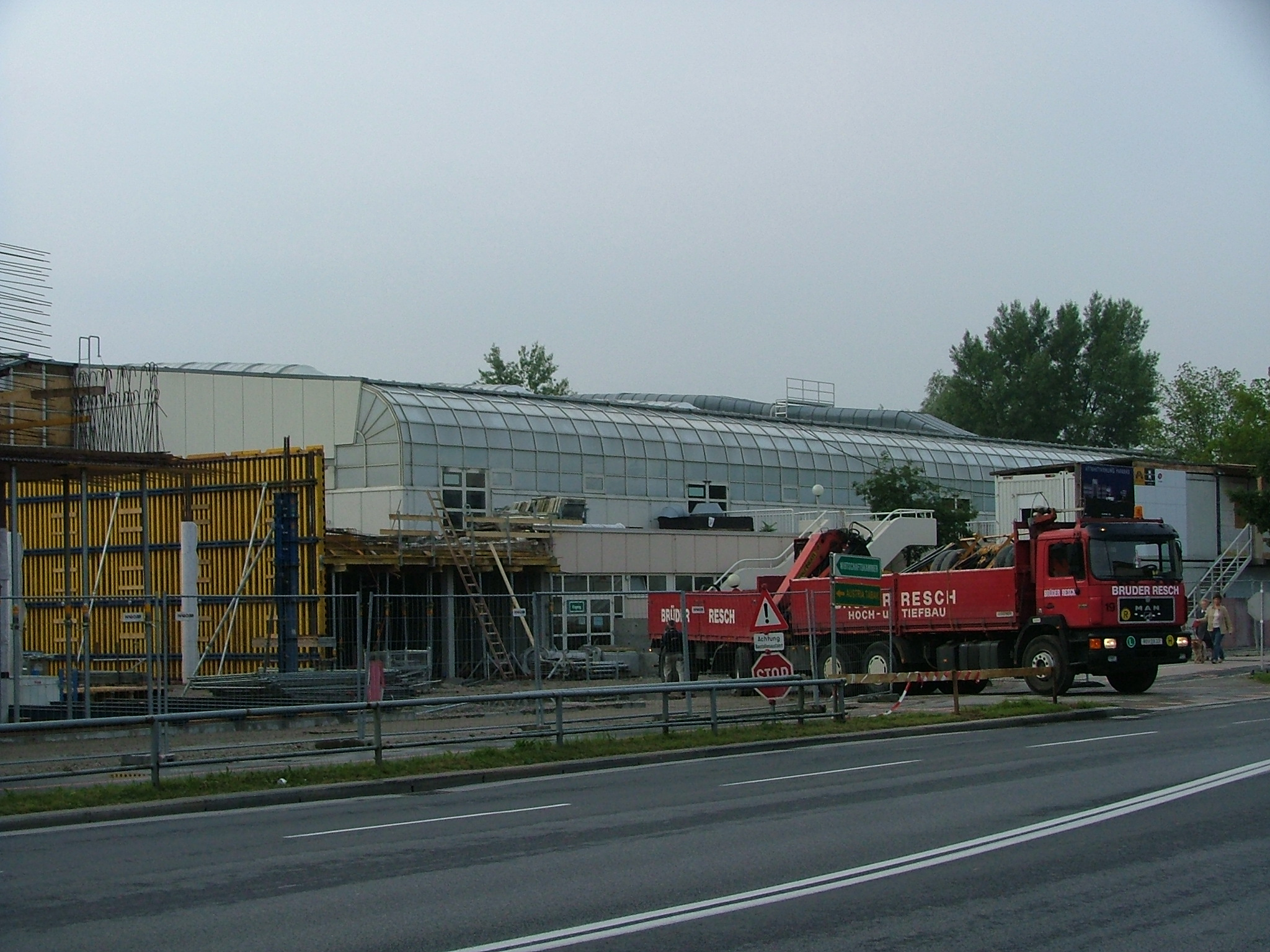
- Interactive map of Linz AG EisArena
- Former names: Donauhalle
- Location: Untere Donaulände 11, 4020 Linz
- Capacity: 4,863

Construction
- Opened: 1986

Tenant
- EHC Black Wings Linz (EBEL)

Linz AG Eisarena (formerly Donauhalle) is an indoor sporting arena located in Linz, Austria. The Linz AG Eisarena has been called the "Keine Sorgen EisArena" since 2008 as a result of a sponsorship deal with an Austrian insurance group. The arena has a capacity of 4,863 people, with around 1,000 seats and was built in 1986. It is currently home of the EHC Black Wings Linz ice hockey team.

Donauhalle also refers to an exhibition complex in Ulm, Germany.
