= Vorarlberghalle =

Indoor sporting arena in Feldkirch, Austria

Coordinates: 47°14′26.40″N 9°35′16.21″E

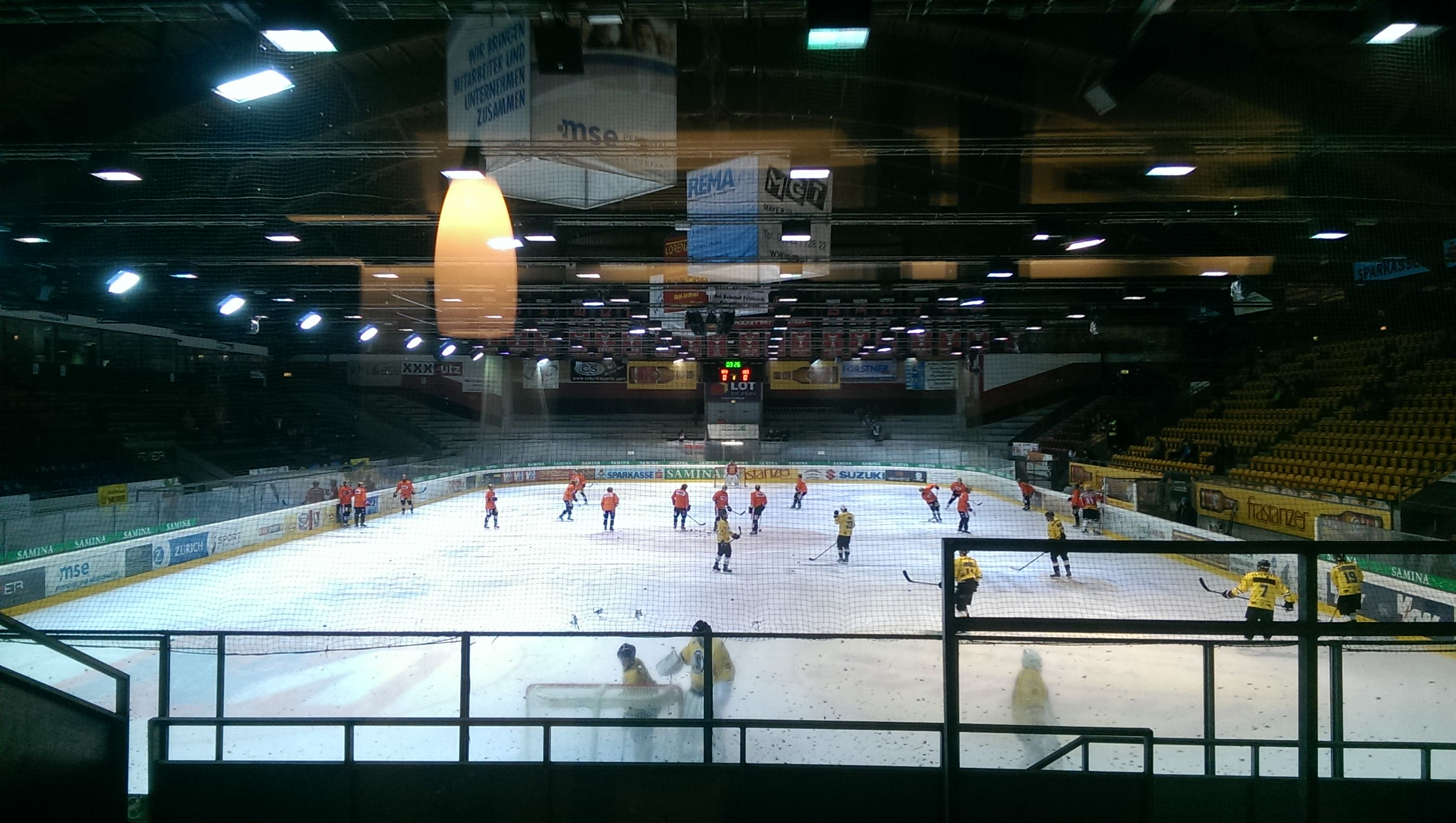
- Interactive map of Vorarlberghalle
- Location: Feldkirch, Austria
- Operator: Kultur Kongress Freizeit – Betriebe Feldkirch GmbH
- Capacity: 5,200

Construction
- Opened: 1977

Tenant
- Feldkirch

Vorarlberghalle is an indoor sporting arena located in Feldkirch, Austria. The capacity of the arena is 5,200 people (2000) and was built in 1977. It is currently home of the VEU Feldkirch ice hockey team.
