= ICE Hockey League =

European sports league

Coordinates: 47.0446°N 15.4553°E

- Current season, competition or edition: 2026–27 ICE Hockey League season
- Sport: Ice hockey
- Founded: 1923; 103 years ago
- CEO: Karl Safron
- No. of teams: 13
- Country: Austria (8 teams); Italy (2 teams); Hungary (2 teams); Slovenia (1 team)
- Most recent champions: Red Bull Salzburg (10th title)
- Most titles: EC KAC (31)
- Broadcaster: Puls 24
- International cup: Champions Hockey League
- Website: www.ice.hockey/en

The ICE Hockey League (International Central European Hockey League, ICEHL), known as the win2day ICE Hockey League for sponsorship reasons, is a Central European hockey league that also serves as the top-tier ice hockey league in Austria. It currently features additional teams from Hungary, Italy, and Slovenia. The league was known as the Erste Bank Eishockey Liga (EBEL) from 2003 until 2020 and as the bet-at-home ICE Hockey League during the 2021–22 season.

Until 2005–06, the league consisted solely of Austrian teams. Since then, the league has added teams from Slovenia (from 2006 to 2017 and from 2021 onwards), Hungary (starting 2007–08), Croatia (from 2009–10 through 2012–13, and again from 2017–18 through 2018–19), the Czech Republic (starting in 2011–12 through 2019–20 and again from 2021-22 onwards), Italy (starting in 2013–14), and Slovakia (starting in 2020–21 through the start of 2021–22).

The non-Austrian teams are competing for the "League Champion" title. Only Austrian teams in this league are additionally eligible for the "Austrian Champion" title. The league has had different sponsors, and the current naming rights have been held by win2day.at since 2022.

Teams from the ICEHL participate in the IIHF's annual Champions Hockey League (CHL), competing for the European Trophy. Participation is based on the strength of the various leagues in Europe (excluding the European/Asian Kontinental Hockey League). Going into the 2022–23 CHL season, the ICEHL was ranked the No. 6 league in Europe, allowing them to send their top three teams to compete in the CHL.

== History ==
=== Foundation ===
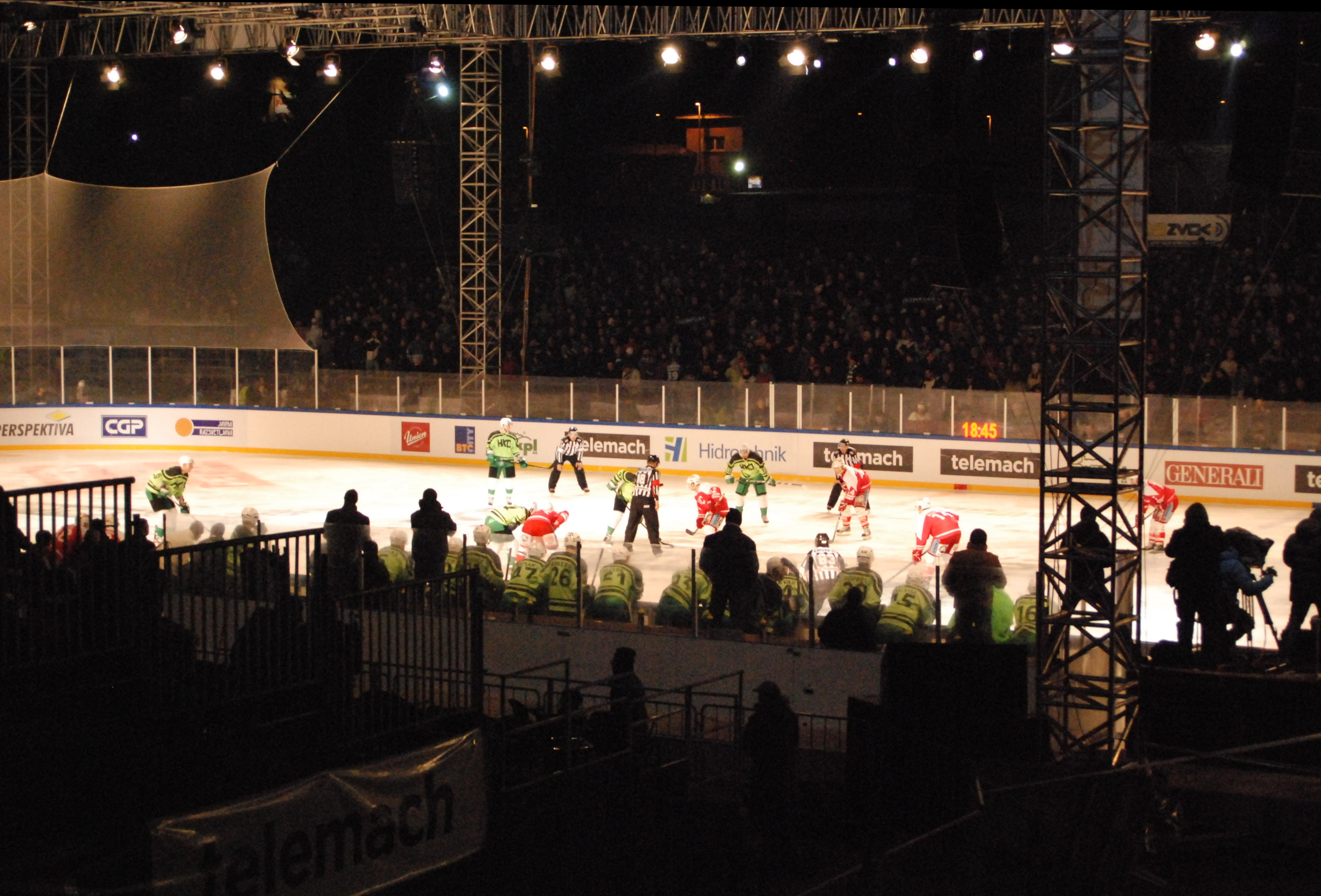
HDD Olimpija vs EC KAC at Bežigrad Stadium during the 2012–13 Austrian Hockey League season

The roots of the league go back to 1923 and various Championships, whose winner is officially recognized as the Austrian Champion. There was no Austrian competition between 1939 and 1945. During World War II, a number of Austrian teams competed in the German Ice Hockey Championship, which is why the EK Engelmann Wien and Vienna EV list German Championships in their history.

=== 1965–1990 ===
The Bundesliga, as it was called, was incepted for the 1965–66 season by EC KAC from Klagenfurt, IEV from Innsbruck, WEVg from Vienna, and KEC from Kitzbühel. EC KAC won the championship 8 times in the 1970s.

When the Austrian national hockey team earned promotion into the Group B of the IIHF, it led to a boom in spectators. Three foreign players were allowed and first signs of financial hiccups came. SV Kapfenberg went bankrupt, and WAT Stadlau abstained from participating in the Bundesliga for financial reasons.

=== 1990–2003 ===
A first step in internationalization was undertaken as the clubs, in addition to the national championship, participated in the Alpenliga. The Alpenliga was formed with clubs from Italy and Slovenia. After making Ralph Krueger their manager in 1991 VEU Feldkirch won five championships from 1994 to 1998. Rising budgets caused more and more clubs to abstain from participation. In 1997 SV Kapfenberg went bankrupt during the season, and the championship was down to only four clubs. In 2000 VEU Feldkirch went bankrupt. The league was named after its sponsor, Uniqua.

=== 2003–2020 ===
In 2003 Erste Bank became sponsor and the league was named Erste Bank Eishockey Liga. In 2013–14, Italy's Bolzano Foxes became the first non-Austrian team to win the EBEL title when they beat the Salzburg Red Bulls 3 games to 2 in their best-of-five final series. Such success is not unheard of for an Italian outfit, but previous similar results took place in the Alpenliga and the Cup of the European Leagues, standalone competitions whose postseason tournaments were distinct from the Austrian playoffs. One year after rejoining the league from the Kontinental Hockey League, KHL Medveščak Zagreb once again withdrew from the EBEL, this time citing the difficult economic situation of the club.

=== 2020–present ===
In 2020, the league was renamed to ICE Hockey League. "ICE" refers to the league's locale – International Central European – and the surface of an ice hockey rink. At the same time, bet-at-home.com became the title sponsor of the league. From the 2021–22 season onwards the league will expand to 14 teams, with reigning champions Olimpija Ljubljana and Pustertal Wölfe joining from the Alps Hockey League and Orli Znojmo returning after a one-year absence. Austrian online betting platform and casino win2day.at became the league's title sponsor in 2022.

== Teams ==
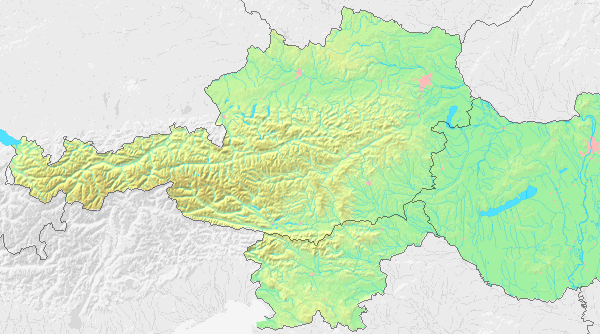
Teams currently participating in the ICEHL.

Team	City	Arena	Capacity	Founded	Joined ICEHL	Left ICEHL
Current teams
EC iDM Wärmepumpen VSV	(Austria) Villach	Villacher Stadthalle	4,800	1923	1977–78	
EC KAC	(Austria) Klagenfurt	Stadthalle Klagenfurt	5,500	1909	1923–24	
EC Red Bull Salzburg	(Austria) Salzburg	Eisarena Salzburg	3,600	1977	2004–05	
Fehérvár AV19	(Hungary) Székesfehérvár	Alba Aréna	6,000	1960	2007–08	
Ferencvárosi TC	(Hungary) Budapest	Tüskecsarnok	2,540	1928	2025–26	
Graz99ers	(Austria) Graz	Eisstadion Liebenau	4,050	1999	2000–01	
HC Bozen–Bolzano	(Italy) Bolzano	Sparkasse Arena	7,220	1933	2013–14	
HC Pustertal Wölfe	(Italy) Bruneck	Intercable Arena	3,100	1954	2021–22	
HC TWK Innsbruck	(Austria) Innsbruck	TIWAG Arena	3,200	1994	2012–13	
HK Olimpija Ljubljana	(Slovenia) Ljubljana	Tivoli Hall	6,800	2004	2021–22	
Steinbach Black Wings Linz	(Austria) Linz	Linz AG Eisarena	3,800	1992	2000–01	
Vienna Capitals	(Austria) Vienna	Erste Bank Arena	7,022	2000	2001–02	
Pioneers Vorarlberg	(Austria) Feldkirch	Vorarlberghalle	5,200	2022	2022–23	
Former teams (since introduction of current league format)
Asiago Hockey 1935	(Italy) Asiago	Pala Hodegart	3,000	1935	2022–23	2024–25
Bratislava Capitals	(Slovakia) Bratislava	Ondrej Nepela Arena	10,055	2015	2020–21	2021–22
VEU Feldkirch	(Austria) Feldkirch	Vorarlberghalle	5,200	1945	1967–68	2003–04
HK Jesenice	(Slovenia) Jesenice	Podmežakla Hall	4,500	1948	2006–07	2011–12
HDD Olimpija Ljubljana	(Slovenia) Ljubljana	Tivoli Hall	7,000	1928	2007–08	2016–17
Medveščak Zagreb	(Croatia) Zagreb	Dom Sportova, Arena Zagreb	5,000; 15,000	1961	2009–10; 2017–18	2012–13; 2018–19
Orli Znojmo	(Czech Republic) Znojmo	Nevoga Arena	5,500	1933	2011–12; 2021–22	2019–20; 2021–22
Dornbirn Bulldogs	(Austria) Dornbirn	Messestadion	4,270	1992	2012–13	2021–22

== Playoffs ==
With their victory in the finals of the 2013–14 season, HC Bolzano became the first non-Austrian team to claim the league title. Previously, the best result from a non-Austrian team was when HDD Olimpija Ljubljana made the finals in the 2007–08 season, losing the eventual champions EC Red Bull Salzburg.

== Outdoor games ==
Event	Date	Site	Home team	Away team	Score	Attendance
Klagenfurt 2015	2015-01-03	Wörthersee Stadion (football)	KAC	**VSV**	1–4	29,700
Šalata 2013	2013-02-01	Šalata (hockey)	Medveščak	**Capitals**	1–2	5,120
Šalata 2010	2010-01-31	Šalata (hockey)	**Medveščak**	Capitals	4–3 (OT)	4,600
Šalata 2010	2010-01-29	Šalata (hockey)	Medveščak	**VSV**	2–3	4,600
Pula 2012	2012-09-16	Pula Arena (amphitheatre)	**Medveščak**	Capitals	4–1	7,130
Pula 2012	2012-09-14	Pula Arena (amphitheatre)	Medveščak	**Olimpija**	1–2	7,022
Klagenfurt 2010	2010-01-09	Wörthersee Stadion (football)	KAC	**VSV**	1–3	30,500

Bolded teams denote winners

== Austrian Champions ==
- 1923 Wiener EV
- 1924 Wiener EV
- 1925 Wiener EV
- 1926 Wiener EV
- 1927 Wiener EV
- 1928 Wiener EV
- 1929 Wiener EV
- 1930 Wiener EV
- 1931 Wiener EV
- 1932 Pötzleinsdorfer SK
- 1933 Wiener EV
- 1934 Klagenfurter
- 1935 EC KAC Klagenfurter
- 1936 EK Engelmann
- 1937 Wiener EV
- 1938 EK Engelmann
- 1939 Not played due to World War II
- 1940 Not played due to World War II
- 1941 Not played due to World War II
- 1942 Not played due to World War II
- 1943 Not played due to World War II
- 1944 Not played due to World War II
- 1945 Not played due to World War II
- 1946 EK Engelmann
- 1947 Wiener EV
- 1948 Wiener EV
- 1949 Wiener EG
- 1950 Wiener EG
- 1951 Wiener EG
- 1952 EC KAC Klagenfurter
- 1953 Innsbrucker EV
- 1954 Innsbrucker EV
- 1955 EC KAC Klagenfurter
- 1956 EK Engelmann
- 1957 EK Engelmann
- 1958 Innsbrucker EV
- 1959 Innsbrucker EV
- 1960 EC KAC
- 1961 Innsbrucker EV
- 1962 Wiener EV
- 1963 Innsbrucker EV
- 1964 EC KAC
- 1965 EC KAC
- 1966 EC KAC
- 1967 EC KAC
- 1968 EC KAC
- 1969 EC KAC
- 1970 EC KAC
- 1971 EC KAC
- 1972 EC KAC
- 1973 EC KAC
- 1974 EC KAC
- 1975 ATSE Graz
- 1976 EC KAC
- 1977 EC KAC
- 1978 ATSE Graz
- 1979 EC KAC
- 1980 EC KAC
- 1981 Villacher SV
- 1982 VEU Feldkirch
- 1983 VEU Feldkirch
- 1984 VEU Feldkirch
- 1985 EC KAC
- 1986 EC KAC
- 1987 EC KAC
- 1988 EC KAC
- 1989 GEV Innsbruck
- 1990 VEU Feldkirch
- 1991 EC KAC
- 1992 Villacher SV
- 1993 Villacher SV
- 1994 VEU Feldkirch
- 1995 VEU Feldkirch
- 1996 VEU Feldkirch
- 1997 VEU Feldkirch
- 1998 VEU Feldkirch
- 1999 Villacher SV
- 2000 EC KAC
- 2001 EC KAC
- 2002 Villacher SV
- 2003 Black Wings Linz
- 2004 EC KAC
- 2005 Vienna Capitals
- 2006 Villacher SV
- 2007 Red Bull Salzburg
- 2008 Red Bull Salzburg
- 2009 EC KAC
- 2010 Red Bull Salzburg
- 2011 Red Bull Salzburg
- 2012 Black Wings Linz
- 2013 EC KAC
- 2014 Red Bull Salzburg (EBEL title winner HC Bozen–Bolzano)
- 2015 Red Bull Salzburg
- 2016 Red Bull Salzburg
- 2017 Vienna Capitals
- 2018 Red Bull Salzburg (EBEL title winner HC Bozen–Bolzano)
- 2019 EC KAC
- 2020 N/A
- 2021 EC KAC
- 2022 Red Bull Salzburg
- 2023 Red Bull Salzburg
- 2024 Red Bull Salzburg
- 2025 Red Bull Salzburg
- 2026 Graz 99ers

Club	Winners	Winning years
EC KAC	32	1934, 1935, 1952, 1955, 1960, 1964, 1965, 1966, 1967, 1968, 1969, 1970, 1971, 1972, 1973, 1974, 1976, 1977, 1979, 1980, 1985, 1986, 1987, 1988, 1991, 2000, 2001, 2004, **2009**, **2013**, **2019**, **2021**
Wiener EV / EG	17	1923, 1924, 1925, 1926, 1927, 1928, 1929, 1930, 1931, 1933, 1937, 1947, 1948, 1949, 1950, 1951, 1962
Red Bull Salzburg	12	**2007**, **2008**, **2010**, **2011**, **2014**^{[*]}, **2015**, **2016**, **2018**^{[*]}, **2022**, **2023**, **2024**, **2025**
VEU Feldkirch	9	1982, 1983, 1984, 1990, 1994, 1995, 1996, 1997, 1998
Innsbrucker EV (also known as GEV Innsbruck)	7	1953, 1954, 1958, 1959, 1961, 1963, 1989
Villacher SV	6	1981, 1992, 1993, 1999, 2002, 2006
EK Engelmann (earlier known as Pötzleinsdorfer SK)	6	1932, 1936, 1938, 1946, 1956, 1957
ATSE Graz	2	1975, 1978
Black Wings Linz	2	2003, **2012**
Vienna Capitals	2	2005, **2017**
Graz 99ers	1	**2026**

bold – seasons in which league had teams outside Austria

^{[*]} – seasons in which the Austrian Champion didn't win the ICEHL title

== See also ==
- Austrian champions (ice hockey)
- Austrian National League, (German: Österreichische Eishockey-Nationalliga) 2nd league in Austria
- Inter-National League
- Alps Hockey League
- Players in the Austrian Hockey League
- Erste Bank Eishockey Liga Playoffs
- Hockey Europe
