= 2006 IIHF World U18 Championships =

2006 IIHF World U18 Championship

Tournament details
- Host country: Sweden
- Venues: 2 (in 2 host cities)
- Dates: April 12–22, 2006
- Teams: 10

Final positions
- Champions: United States (3rd title)
- Runners-up: Finland
- Third place: Czech Republic
- Fourth place: Canada

Tournament statistics
- Games played: 31
- Goals scored: 190 (6.13 per game)
- Attendance: 11,798 (381 per game)
- Scoring leader: (United States) Patrick Kane (12 points)

The 2006 IIHF World U18 Championships were held in Ängelholm and Halmstad, Sweden. The championships began on April 12, 2006 and finished on April 22, 2006. Games were played at Ängelholms Ishall in Ängelholm and Sannarps Isstadion in Halmstad. The United States to claim the gold medal, after defeated Finland 3–1 in the final, while the Czech Republic defeated Canada 4–1 to capture the bronze medal.

== Championship results ==
=== Preliminary round ===
==== Group A ====
| Pos | Team | Pld | W | L | D | GF | GA | GD | Pts |
|---|---|---|---|---|---|---|---|---|---|
| 1 | United States | 4 | 4 | 0 | 0 | 30 | 3 | +27 | 8 |
| 2 | Russia | 4 | 3 | 1 | 0 | 21 | 9 | +12 | 6 |
| 3 | Czech Republic | 4 | 2 | 2 | 0 | 9 | 11 | −2 | 4 |
| 4 | Germany | 4 | 1 | 3 | 0 | 12 | 23 | −11 | 2 |
| 5 | Belarus | 4 | 0 | 4 | 0 | 4 | 30 | −26 | 0 |

==== Results ====
| April 12, 2006 | Czech Republic | 4–2 | Germany | Ängelholms Ishall, Ängelholm; Attendance: 263 |

| | Referee: Derek Zalaski (Canada) |
| J. Voráček (PP) 10:07; M. Bartoš (ES) 22:25; J. Tlustý (SH) 45:38; J. Voráček (ES) 52:01 / Goals / 37:54 (ES) E. Ostwald; 56:05 (ES) M. Brandl | Referee: Derek Zalaski (Canada) |

| April 12, 2006 | Russia | 2–4 | United States | Ängelholms Ishall, Ängelholm; Attendance: 447 |

| | Referee: Soeren Persson (Sweden) |
| E. Bodrov (ES) 01:16; A. Anisimov (SH) 06:25 / Goals / 04:01 (PP) J. McBain; 43:21 (PS) B. Sweatt; 54:30 (ES) B. Sweatt; 59:59 (EN) R. Flynn | Referee: Soeren Persson (Sweden) |

| April 13, 2006 | Russia | 8–0 | Belarus | Ängelholms Ishall, Ängelholm; Attendance: 203 |

| | Referee: Juraj Konc (Slovakia) |
| A. Glovatsky (ES) 03:35; A. Popov (PP) 09:15; S. Zachupeyko (PP) 11:34; Y. Alexandrov (ES) 18:32; A. Vasyunov (ES) 21:45; A. Vasyunov (PP) 24:30; M. Glukhov (PP) 35:05; R. Bashkirov (PP) 43:39 / Goals | Referee: Juraj Konc (Slovakia) |

| April 13, 2006 | Germany | 0–9 | United States | Ängelholms Ishall, Ängelholm; Attendance: 159 |

| | Referee: Sami Partanen (Finland) |
| Goals / 04:27 (ES) P. Kane; 07:56 (ES) P. Kane; 08:59 (ES) L. Popko; 21:46 (ES) J. O'Brien; 23:30 (PP) M. Carman; 27:52 (PP) P. Kane; 38:42 (ES) L. Popko; 46:42 (ES) B. Sweatt; 58:44 (PP) B. Geoffrion | Referee: Sami Partanen (Finland) |

| April 14, 2006 | Belarus | 2–5 | Czech Republic | Ängelholms Ishall, Ängelholm; Attendance: 151 |

| | Referee: Soeren Persson (Sweden) |
| A. Syrei (PP) 30:55; D. Korobov (ES) 41:56 / Goals / 10:16 (PP) D. Růžička; 24:34 (ES) M. Frolík; 24:48 (ES) D. Květoň; 36:01 (ES) M. Látal; 55:27 (PP) M. Frolík | Referee: Soeren Persson (Sweden) |

| April 15, 2006 | Germany | 5–9 | Russia | Ängelholms Ishall, Ängelholm; Attendance: 239 |

| | Referee: Soeren Persson (Sweden) |
| M. Endrass (PP) 03:19; T. Weiszdorn (SH) 27:48; M. Garten (PP) 49:34; C. Braun (PP) 56:19; M. Endrass (PP) 59:59 / Goals / 02:09 (SH) S. Zachupeyko; 05:05 (ES) R. Bashkirov; 17:07 (SH) R. Bashkirov; 21:53 (ES) R. Bashkirov; 31:14 (PP) A. Ryabev; 31:38 (ES) R. Bashkirov; 34:18 (ES) A. Glovatsky; 40:26 (ES) E. Bodrov; 41:27 (ES) A. Glovatsky | Referee: Soeren Persson (Sweden) |

| April 15, 2006 | United States | 5–0 | Czech Republic | Ängelholms Ishall, Ängelholm; Attendance: 307 |

| | Referee: Sami Partanen (Finland) |
| R. Rakhshani (PP) 18:27; R. Rakhshani (PP) 31:35; P. Kane (ES) 37:01; M. Carman (ES) 43:06; B. Sweatt (PP) 48:43 / Goals | Referee: Sami Partanen (Finland) |

| April 16, 2006 | Belarus | 1–5 | Germany | Ängelholms Ishall, Ängelholm; Attendance: 141 |

| | Referee: Derek Zalaski (Canada) |
| A. Karatkevich (ES) 29:21 / Goals / 01:01 (ES) E. Ostwald; 14:01 (ES) T. Weiszdorn; 22:33 (ES) P. Hager; 23:02 (PP) K. Holzer; 53:43 (PP) C. Braun | Referee: Derek Zalaski (Canada) |

| April 17, 2006 | Czech Republic | 0–2 | Russia | Ängelholms Ishall, Ängelholm; Attendance: 381 |

| | Referee: Derek Zalaski (Canada) |
| Goals / 24:58 (PP) A. Anisimov; 59:42 (EN) A. Glovatsky | Referee: Derek Zalaski (Canada) |

| April 17, 2006 | United States | 12–1 | Belarus | Ängelholms Ishall, Ängelholm; Attendance: 140 |

| | Referee: Nadir Mandioni (Switzerland) |
| E. Johnson (PP) 04:30; E. Johnson (PP) 08:38; R. Rakhshani (PP) 09:34; P. Kane (ES) 21:02; P. Kane (PP) 23:15; J. O'Brien (PP) 23:32; E. Johnson (PP) 27:06; M. Carman (ES) 28:56; J. O'Brien (PP) 31:11; B. Sweatt (ES) 31:33; E. Johnson (ES) 35:33; R. Hayes (ES) 57:01 / Goals / 33:44 (PP) D. Shumski | Referee: Nadir Mandioni (Switzerland) |

==== Group B ====
| Pos | Team | Pld | W | L | D | GF | GA | GD | Pts |
|---|---|---|---|---|---|---|---|---|---|
| 1 | Finland | 4 | 3 | 0 | 1 | 12 | 7 | +5 | 7 |
| 2 | Sweden | 4 | 3 | 1 | 0 | 15 | 8 | +7 | 6 |
| 3 | Canada | 4 | 2 | 1 | 1 | 12 | 5 | +7 | 5 |
| 4 | Slovakia | 4 | 1 | 3 | 0 | 11 | 16 | −5 | 2 |
| 5 | Norway | 4 | 0 | 4 | 0 | 7 | 21 | −14 | 0 |

==== Results ====
| April 12, 2006 | Slovakia | 1–3 | Canada | Sannarps Isstadion, Halmstad; Attendance: 197 |

| | Referee: Sami Partanen (Finland) |
| R. Konečný (PP) 26:53 / Goals / 21:23 (ES) J. Azevedo; 30:01 (PP) F. Bouchard; 59:28 (EN) B. Sutter | Referee: Sami Partanen (Finland) |

| April 12, 2006 | Sweden | 5–2 | Norway | Sannarps Isstadion, Halmstad; Attendance: 369 |

| | Referee: Nadir Mandioni (Switzerland) |
| N. Andersen (PP) 05:24; P. Berglund (ES) 07:21; T. Larsson (PP) 27:23; P. Berglund (PP) 44:47; T. Lagerström (ES) 45:11 / Goals / 06:06 (ES) P. Molberg; 30:28 (PP) L. Mengshoel | Referee: Nadir Mandioni (Switzerland) |

| April 13, 2006 | Norway | 2–9 | Canada | Sannarps Isstadion, Halmstad |

| | Referee: Alexey Ravodin (Russia) |
| P. Rohn (PP) 05:10; R. Dahlstrøm (PP) 26:38 / Goals / 12:03 (PP) J. Azevedo; 15:35 (PP) F. Bouchard; 24:10 (ES) J. Tavares; 29:09 (PP) J. Azevedo; 32:28 (PP) J. Azevedo; 37:22 (PP) L. Pyett; 38:45 (ES) B. Maxwell; 42:04 (ES) V. Bartley; 51:45 (ES) C. Emmerton | Referee: Alexey Ravodin (Russia) |

| April 13, 2006 | Slovakia | 3–6 | Finland | Sannarps Isstadion, Halmstad; Attendance: 235 |

| | Referee: Robert Ritchie (United States) |
| R. Konečný (PP) 37:01; M. Jurík (ES) 41:42; R. Konečný (ES) 47:51 / Goals / 06:01 (ES) J. Juutilainen; 09:52 (PP) J. Puustinen; 18:42 (ES) J. Juutilainen; 21:58 (PP) J. Juutilainen; 22:10 (ES) J. Lehtivuori; 52:40 (PP) J. Savolainen | Referee: Robert Ritchie (United States) |

| April 14, 2006 | Finland | 4–3 | Sweden | Sannarps Isstadion, Halmstad; Attendance: 1,135 |

| | Referee: Alexey Ravodin (Russia) |
| M. Warn (ES) 01:19; R. Nyholm (PP) 14:16; J. Jalvanti (ES) 17:56; M. Warn (EN) 59:14 / Goals / 38:10 (ES) M. Backlund; 54:07 (ES) P. Berglund; 59:40 (ES) E. Moe | Referee: Alexey Ravodin (Russia) |

| April 15, 2006 | Norway | 2–5 | Slovakia | Sannarps Isstadion, Halmstad; Attendance: 231 |

| | Referee: Nadir Mandioni (Switzerland) |
| M. Ylven (PP) 21:07; P. Bovim (PP) 36:41 / Goals / 08:07 (PP) I. Roháč; 09:06 (ES) J. Šinkovič; 23:29 (ES) L. Zeliska; 33:18 (PP) I. Roháč; 39:22 (ES) I. Roháč | Referee: Nadir Mandioni (Switzerland) |

| April 15, 2006 | Canada | 0–2 | Sweden | Sannarps Isstadion, Halmstad; Attendance: 764 |

| | Referee: Robert Ritchie (United States) |
| Goals / 52:05 (ES) T. Lagerström; 59:50 (EN) T. Lagerström | Referee: Robert Ritchie (United States) |

| April 16, 2006 | Finland | 2–1 | Norway | Sannarps Isstadion, Halmstad; Attendance: 291 |

| | Referee: Juraj Konc (Slovakia) |
| J. Savolainen (ES) 09:04; I. Heikkila (ES) 58:24 / Goals / 56:53 (ES) M. Weberg | Referee: Juraj Konc (Slovakia) |

| April 17, 2006 | Canada | 0–0 | Finland | Sannarps Isstadion, Halmstad; Attendance: 424 |

| Referee: Alexey Ravodin (Russia) |

| April 17, 2006 | Sweden | 5–2 | Slovakia | Sannarps Isstadion, Halmstad; Attendance: 713 |

| | Referee: Robert Ritchie (United States) |
| V. Sjödin (ES) 11:07; R. Figren (PP) 12:52; T. Larsson (PP) 14:11; P. Berglund (SH) 24:16; R. Figren (PP) 30:40 / Goals / 39:14 (PP) M. Bališ; 42:07 (PP) M. Jurík | Referee: Robert Ritchie (United States) |

=== Relegation round ===
| Pos | Team | Pld | W | L | D | GF | GA | GD | Pts |
|---|---|---|---|---|---|---|---|---|---|
| 1 | Slovakia | 3 | 2 | 1 | 0 | 7 | 5 | +2 | 4 |
| 2 | Germany | 3 | 1 | 1 | 1 | 8 | 5 | +3 | 3 |
| 3 | Belarus | 3 | 1 | 1 | 1 | 9 | 11 | −2 | 3 |
| 4 | Norway | 3 | 0 | 1 | 2 | 10 | 13 | −3 | 2 |

==== Results ====
Note: The following matches from the preliminary round carry forward to the relegation round:
- April 15, 2006: Norway 2–5 Slovakia
- April 16, 2006: Belarus 1–5 Germany

| April 19, 2006 | Germany | 2–2 | Norway | Sannarps Isstadion, Halmstad; Attendance: 51 |

| | Referee: Robert Ritchie (United States) |
| T. Weiszdorn (ES) 32:13; C. Braun (PP) 37:46 / Goals / 11:12 (PP) P. Bovim; 11:40 (PP) K. Olimb | Referee: Robert Ritchie (United States) |

| April 19, 2006 | Slovakia | 0–2 | Belarus | Sannarps Isstadion, Halmstad; Attendance: 45 |

| | Referee: Derek Zalaski (Canada) |
| Goals / 35:46 (PP) M. Stsefanovich; 44:48 (ES) M. Stsefanovich | Referee: Derek Zalaski (Canada) |

| April 20, 2006 | Belarus | 6–6 | Norway | Sannarps Isstadion, Halmstad; Attendance: 51 |

| | Referee: Juraj Konc (Slovakia) |
| A. Karatkevich (PP) 00:53; A. Demkov (ES) 03:57; V. Sachko (ES) 05:47; V. Mikhailov (ES) 34:28; D. Korobov (PP) 39:52; I. Voroshilov (PP) 45:37 / Goals / 24:17 (PP) M. Ylven; 33:50 (PP) P. Bovim; 43:31 (ES) T. Kristiansen; 55:19 (SH) R. Dahlstrøm; 56:18 (ES) P. Rohn; 56:43 (ES) P. Rohn | Referee: Juraj Konc (Slovakia) |

| April 20, 2006 | Germany | 1–2 | Slovakia | Sannarps Isstadion, Halmstad; Attendance: 46 |

| | Referee: Soeren Persson (Sweden) |
| M. Endrass (PP) 22:03 / Goals / 40:15 (PP) T. Marčinko; 43:53 (ES) E. Čaládi | Referee: Soeren Persson (Sweden) |

=== Final round ===
Quarterfinals
A2 | Russia | 1
B3 | Canada | 4
B2 | Sweden | 0
A3 | Czech Republic | 3

Semifinals
B1 | Finland | 3
QF1 | Canada | 2
A1 | United States | 4
QF2 | Czech Republic | 3

Final
SF1 | Finland | 1
SF2 | United States | 3

==== Quarterfinals ====
| April 19, 2006 | Russia | 1–4 | Canada | Ängelholms Ishall, Ängelholm; Attendance: 417 |

| | Referee: Sami Partanen (Finland) |
| S. Zachupeyko (PP) 09:29 / Goals / 38:24 (PP) J. Tavares; 45:02 (PP) J. McGinn; 57:31 (PP) J. McGinn; 58:03 (ES) S. Matthias | Referee: Sami Partanen (Finland) |

| April 19, 2006 | Sweden | 0–3 | Czech Republic | Ängelholms Ishall, Ängelholm; Attendance: 878 |

| | Referee: Alexey Ravodin (Russia) |
| Goals / 38:05 (PP) J. Tlustý; 58:16 (ES) M. Bartoš; 59:04 (EN) D. Květoň | Referee: Alexey Ravodin (Russia) |

==== Semifinals ====
| April 20, 2006 | Finland | 3 – 2 OT | Canada | Ängelholms Ishall, Ängelholm; Attendance: 438 |

| | Referee: Robert Ritchie (United States) |
| R. Nyholm (PP) 24:45; J. Jalvanti (ES) 42:06; J. Jarvinen (ES) 61:22 / Goals / 13:32 (ES) F. Bouchard; 28:33 (ES) B. Maxwell | Referee: Robert Ritchie (United States) |

| April 20, 2006 | Czech Republic | 3 – 4 OT | United States | Ängelholms Ishall, Ängelholm; Attendance: 369 |

| | Referee: Nadir Mandioni (Switzerland) |
| B. Višňák (PP) 25:00; M. Bartoš (PP) 43:38; J. Tlustý (ES) 52:47 / Goals / 04:22 (ES) R. Flynn; 17:04 (PP) J. McBain; 18:47 (PP) R. Rakhshani; 66:50 (ES) P. Kane | Referee: Nadir Mandioni (Switzerland) |

==== Fifth place game ====
| April 21, 2006 | Russia | 5–2 | Sweden | Ängelholms Ishall, Ängelholm; Attendance: 333 |

| | Referee: Juraj Konc (Slovakia) |
| R. Bashkirov (ES) 14:27; A. Anisimov (ES) 29:45; A. Popov (ES) 33:23; V. Zharkov (EN) 59:01; A. Popov (EN) 59:52 / Goals / 03:30 (PP) D. Persson; 34:46 (PP) R. Figren | Referee: Juraj Konc (Slovakia) |

==== Bronze medal game ====
| April 22, 2006 | Canada | 1–4 | Czech Republic | Ängelholms Ishall, Ängelholm; Attendance: 875 |

| | Referee: Sami Partanen (Finland) |
| B. Sutter (PP) 43:44 / Goals / 27:07 (PP) J. Voráček; 30:21 (PP) J. Tlustý; 36:44 (PP) M. Kazatel; 53:52 (PP) L. Lang | Referee: Sami Partanen (Finland) |

==== Gold medal game ====
| April 22, 2006 | United States | 3–1 | Finland | Ängelholms Ishall, Ängelholm; Attendance: 1,221 |

| | Referee: Nadir Mandioni (Switzerland) |
| R. Rakhshani (ES) 25:24; C. Summers (PP) 39:59; M. Carman (EN) 59:58 / Goals / 15:27 (ES) J. Kemppainen | Referee: Nadir Mandioni (Switzerland) |

=== Final standings ===
| Rk. | Team |
|---|---|
| 1st place, gold medalist(s) | United States |
| 2nd place, silver medalist(s) | Finland |
| 3rd place, bronze medalist(s) | Czech Republic |
| 4 | Canada |
| 5 | Russia |
| 6 | Sweden |
| 7 | Slovakia |
| 8 | Germany |
| 9 | Belarus |
| 10 | Norway |

Belarus and Norway are relegated to Division I for the 2007 IIHF World U18 Championships.

=== Scoring leaders ===
| Player | Country | GP | G | A | Pts | PIM |
|---|---|---|---|---|---|---|
| Patrick Kane | United States | 6 | 7 | 5 | 12 | 2 |
| Jamie McBain | United States | 6 | 2 | 9 | 11 | 0 |
| Erik Johnson | United States | 6 | 4 | 6 | 10 | 27 |
| Ruslan Bashkirov | Russia | 6 | 6 | 2 | 8 | 4 |
| Mike Carman | United States | 6 | 4 | 4 | 8 | 10 |
| Justin Azevedo | Canada | 7 | 4 | 4 | 8 | 20 |
| François Bouchard | Canada | 7 | 3 | 5 | 8 | 6 |
| Bill Sweatt | United States | 6 | 5 | 2 | 7 | 4 |
| Jiří Tlustý | Czech Republic | 7 | 4 | 3 | 7 | 8 |
| Martin Ylven | Norway | 6 | 2 | 5 | 7 | 4 |
| David Kveton | Czech Republic | 7 | 2 | 5 | 7 | 2 |
| Ben Maxwell | Canada | 7 | 2 | 5 | 7 | 10 |

=== Goaltending leaders ===
(Minimum 60 minutes played)

| Player | Country | MINS | GA | Sv% | GAA | SO |
|---|---|---|---|---|---|---|
| Stanislav Galimov | Russia | 60:00 | 0 | 1.000 | 0.00 | 1 |
| Brett Bennett | United States | 120:00 | 1 | .969 | 0.50 | 1 |
| Jakub Kovář | Czech Republic | 105:08 | 2 | .964 | 1.14 | 0 |
| Joe Palmer | United States | 246:50 | 6 | .949 | 1.46 | 1 |
| Jonathan Bernier | Canada | 420:32 | 12 | .943 | 1.71 | 1 |

== Division I ==
Division I consisted of two separate tournaments. The Group A tournament was held between 3 and 9 April 2006 in Miskolc, Hungary and the Group B tournament was held between 2 and 8 April 2006 in Riga, Latvia. Switzerland and Latvia won the Group A and Group B tournaments respectively and gained promotion to the Championship Division for the 2007 IIHF World U18 Championships. While Hungary finished last in Group A and South Korea last in Group B and were both relegated to Division II for 2007.

Group standings

Group A

1. Switzerland — promoted to Championship Division for 2007
2. Slovenia
3. Kazakhstan
4. France
5. Austria
6. Hungary — relegated to Division II for 2007

Group B

1. Latvia — promoted to Championship Division for 2007
2. Denmark
3. Japan
4. Poland
5. Ukraine
6. South Korea — relegated to Division II for 2007

== Division II ==
Division II consisted of two separate tournaments. The Group A tournament was held between 2 and 8 April 2006 in Merano, Italy and the Group B tournament was held between 15 and 21 March 2006 in Elektrėnai and Kaunas, Lithuania. Italy and Great Britain won the Group A and Group B tournaments respectively and gained promotion to Division I for the 2007 IIHF World U18 Championships. While Spain finished last in Group A and Iceland last in Group B and were both relegated to Division III for 2007.

Group standings

Group A

1. Italy — promoted to Division I for 2007
2. Netherlands
3. Estonia
4. Belgium
5. Serbia and Montenegro
6. Spain — relegated to Division III for 2007

Group B

1. Great Britain — promoted to Division I for 2007
2. Lithuania
3. Australia
4. Croatia
5. Mexico
6. Iceland — relegated to Division III for 2007

== Division III ==
The Division III tournament was held between 13 and 19 March 2006 in Miercurea-Ciuc, Romania. Romania and Israel finished first and second respectively and both gained promotion to Division II for the 2007 IIHF World U18 Championships. While Bulgaria finished fifth and Turkey sixth and were relegated to the 2007 Division III Qualification tournament.

Group standings

1. Romania — promoted to Division II for 2007
2. Israel — promoted to Division II for 2007
3. South Africa
4. New Zealand
5. Bulgaria — relegated to Division III Qualification for 2007
6. Turkey — relegated to Division III Qualification for 2007
