= Jan-Mikael Juutilainen =

Finnish ice hockey player

- Born: January 5, 1988 (age 38) Espoo, Finland
- Height: 5 ft 11 in (180 cm)
- Weight: 182 lb (83 kg; 13 st 0 lb)
- Position: Forward
- Shot: Left
- Played for: Jokerit; HPK; KooKoo
- NHL draft: 156th overall, 2006; Chicago Blackhawks
- Playing career: 2006–2018

Jan-Mikael Juutilainen (born January 5, 1988) is a Finnish former professional ice hockey player who played with Jokerit, HPK and KooKoo of the Finnish Liiga. He was originally selected by the Chicago Blackhawks in the 6th round (156th overall) of the 2006 NHL entry draft.

== Career statistics ==
=== Regular season and playoffs ===
| | | | Regular season | | | | | Playoffs |
| Season | Team | League | GP | G | A | Pts | PIM | GP | G | A | Pts | PIM |
|---|---|---|---|---|---|---|---|---|---|---|---|---|
| 2004–05 | Jokerit | FIN U18 | 30 | 15 | 6 | 21 | 4 | 7 | 1 | 1 | 2 | 0 |
| 2004–05 | Jokerit | FIN U20 | 1 | 0 | 0 | 0 | 0 | — | — | — | — | — |
| 2005–06 | Jokerit | FIN U18 | 12 | 7 | 7 | 14 | 26 | 6 | 6 | 7 | 13 | 2 |
| 2005–06 | Jokerit | FIN U20 | 36 | 3 | 12 | 15 | 35 | 4 | 0 | 0 | 0 | 2 |
| 2005–06 | Suomi U20 | Mestis | 1 | 0 | 0 | 0 | 0 | — | — | — | — | — |
| 2006–07 | Waterloo Black Hawks | USHL | 46 | 9 | 10 | 19 | 18 | 5 | 0 | 0 | 0 | 0 |
| 2007–08 | Waterloo Black Hawks | USHL | 44 | 6 | 7 | 13 | 16 | 11 | 4 | 2 | 6 | 4 |
| 2007–08 | Suomi U20 | Mestis | 2 | 0 | 0 | 0 | 0 | — | — | — | — | — |
| 2008–09 | Jokerit | FIN U20 | 30 | 9 | 22 | 31 | 39 | 4 | 2 | 0 | 2 | 2 |
| 2008–09 | Jokerit | SM-liiga | 21 | 1 | 0 | 1 | 6 | — | — | — | — | — |
| 2009–10 | Jokerit | FIN U20 | 13 | 9 | 13 | 22 | 8 | — | — | — | — | — |
| 2009–10 | Jokerit | SM-liiga | 40 | 0 | 0 | 0 | 2 | — | — | — | — | — |
| 2010–11 | Jokerit | SM-liiga | 42 | 3 | 1 | 4 | 6 | 1 | 0 | 0 | 0 | 0 |
| 2010–11 | Kiekko–Vantaa | Mestis | 1 | 0 | 1 | 1 | 0 | — | — | — | — | — |
| 2011–12 | HPK | SM-liiga | 36 | 7 | 2 | 9 | 8 | — | — | — | — | — |
| 2012–13 | KooKoo | Mestis | 34 | 12 | 13 | 25 | 20 | 11 | 2 | 4 | 6 | 0 |
| 2013–14 | KooKoo | Mestis | 51 | 21 | 16 | 37 | 8 | 10 | 1 | 2 | 3 | 2 |
| 2014–15 | KooKoo | Mestis | 45 | 10 | 23 | 33 | 6 | 19 | 2 | 5 | 7 | 4 |
| 2015–16 | KooKoo | Liiga | 54 | 6 | 6 | 12 | 4 | — | — | — | — | — |
| 2016–17 | KooKoo | Liiga | 55 | 7 | 5 | 12 | 8 | — | — | — | — | — |
| 2017–18 | KooKoo | Liiga | 45 | 2 | 2 | 4 | 14 | — | — | — | — | — |
| Mestis totals | | | 134 | 43 | 53 | 96 | 34 | 40 | 5 | 11 | 16 | 6 |
| Liiga totals | | | 293 | 26 | 16 | 42 | 48 | 1 | 0 | 0 | 0 | 0 |

=== International ===
| Year | Team | Event | GP | G | A | Pts | PIM |
|---|---|---|---|---|---|---|---|
| 2005 | Finland | U17 | 5 | 2 | 4 | 6 | 0 |
| 2005 | Finland | U18 | 5 | 3 | 1 | 4 | 0 |
| 2006 | Finland | WJC18 | 6 | 3 | 2 | 5 | 0 |
| 2008 | Finland | WJC | 5 | 1 | 5 | 6 | 2 |
| Junior totals | | | 21 | 9 | 12 | 21 | 2 |
