= Constantin Braun =

German ice hockey player (born 1988)

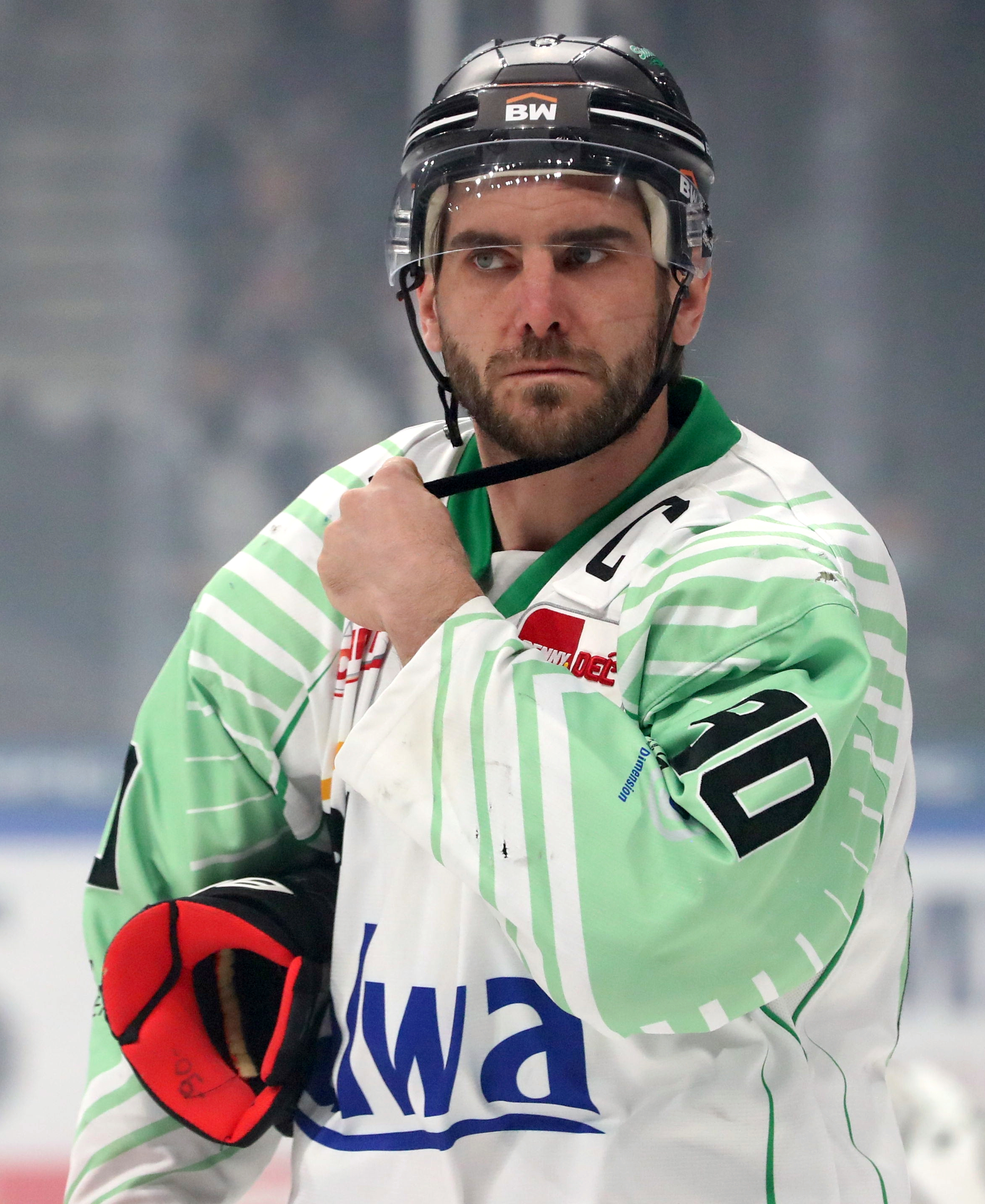
- Born: 11 March 1988 (age 38) Lampertheim, West Germany
- Height: 6 ft 3 in (191 cm)
- Weight: 196 lb (89 kg; 14 st 0 lb)
- Position: Defence
- Shoots: Left
- DEL team Former teams: Nürnberg Ice Tigers; Eisbären Berlin; Krefeld Pinguine; Bietigheim Steelers
- National team: Germany
- NHL draft: 164th overall, 2006; Los Angeles Kings
- Playing career: 2005–present

Constantin Braun (born 11 March 1988) is a German professional ice hockey defenceman who is currently playing for the Nürnberg Ice Tigers of the Deutsche Eishockey Liga (DEL).

== Playing career ==
Braun was drafted by the Los Angeles Kings in the 2006 NHL entry draft in the sixth round, 164th overall, and began playing professionally with Berlin in the 2005–06 season.

As a five-time German champion, following his 15th season with Eisbären Berlin, Braun was reunited with his brother Laurin, as he was loaned to the Krefeld Pinguine for the following 2020–21 season on 9 December 2020.

== International play ==
Braun has played internationally for the German national team. Braun was named to the Germany men's national ice hockey team for competition at the 2014 IIHF World Championship.

== Family ==
His younger brother, Laurin, also plays for the Eisbären. His older brother, Simon coaches the Eisbären junior team. Constantin Braun is a father of 3.

== Career statistics ==
=== Regular season and playoffs ===
			Regular season					Playoffs
Season	Team	League	GP	G	A	Pts	PIM	GP	G	A	Pts	PIM
2003–04	Jungadler Mannheim	DNL	30	12	5	17	42	—	—	—	—	—
2004–05	Eisbären Juniors Berlin	DNL	39	14	20	34	125	6	4	5	9	16
2004–05	Eisbären Juniors Berlin	GER.3	1	0	0	0	0	—	—	—	—	—
2005–06	Eisbären Juniors Berlin	DNL	7	8	4	12	14	1	1	0	1	6
2005–06	Eisbären Berlin	DEL	6	0	0	0	0	—	—	—	—	—
2005–06	Eisbären Juniors Berlin	GER.3	14	5	5	10	18	—	—	—	—	—
2006–07	Eisbären Berlin	DEL	34	1	3	4	14	—	—	—	—	—
2006–07	Eisbären Juniors Berlin	GER.3	10	4	3	7	37	—	—	—	—	—
2007–08	Eisbären Berlin	DEL	50	4	7	11	32	14	3	7	10	2
2007–08	Eisbären Juniors Berlin	GER.3	2	0	0	0	0	—	—	—	—	—
2008–09	Eisbären Berlin	DEL	43	6	9	15	20	12	0	2	2	2
2008–09	Eisbären Juniors Berlin	GER.3	2	1	4	5	2	—	—	—	—	—
2009–10	Eisbären Berlin	DEL	40	6	12	18	24	5	0	2	2	2
2010–11	Eisbären Berlin	DEL	51	6	12	18	48	12	2	3	5	8
2011–12	Eisbären Berlin	DEL	37	5	13	18	14	13	2	1	3	8
2012–13	Eisbären Berlin	DEL	40	8	18	26	26	13	2	10	12	8
2013–14	Eisbären Berlin	DEL	30	2	11	13	26	3	0	1	1	0
2014–15	Eisbären Berlin	DEL	13	2	9	11	6	—	—	—	—	—
2015–16	Eisbären Berlin	DEL	52	7	12	19	34	7	1	2	3	8
2016–17	Eisbären Berlin	DEL	52	1	11	12	42	13	0	3	3	20
2017–18	Eisbären Berlin	DEL	24	2	6	8	4	—	—	—	—	—
2018–19	Eisbären Berlin	DEL	11	0	1	1	2	8	0	0	0	0
2019–20	Eisbären Berlin	DEL	38	0	7	7	10	—	—	—	—	—
2020–21	Krefeld Pinguine	DEL	37	0	6	6	14	—	—	—	—	—
2021–22	Bietigheim Steelers	DEL	51	6	23	29	10	—	—	—	—	—
2022–23	Bietigheim Steelers	DEL	47	4	22	26	14	—	—	—	—	—
2023–24	Nürnberg Ice Tigers	DEL	47	1	11	12	20	2	1	1	2	2
2024–25	Nürnberg Ice Tigers	DEL	51	0	5	5	12	9	2	2	4	0
DEL totals			754	61	198	259	372	111	13	34	47	60

=== International ===
Year	Team	Event	GP	G	A	Pts	PIM
2005	Germany	U17	4	0	0	0	4
2005	Germany	WJC18	6	1	2	3	12
2006	Germany	WJC18	6	2	4	6	4
2007	Germany	WJC	6	1	0	1	18
2008	Germany	WJC D1	5	4	2	6	8
2010	Germany	WC	9	0	0	0	4
2011	Germany	WC	7	0	2	2	4
2013	Germany	OGQ	3	0	2	2	2
2014	Germany	WC	7	0	0	0	2
2016	Germany	WC	6	1	1	2	4
Junior totals			27	8	8	16	46
Senior totals			32	1	5	6	16

== Awards and honors ==
Award	Year
DEL
Champion (Eisbären Berlin)	2008, 2009, 2011, 2012, 2013
