= Květoň =

Květoň is a Czech surname, which is derived from the given name Květoň, from the Czech kvet, meaning "flower". Notablem individuals with this surname include:

- David Květoň (born 1988), Czech ice hockey player
- Lukáš Květoň (born 1982), Czech ice hockey player
