= Elia Ostwald =

German ice hockey player

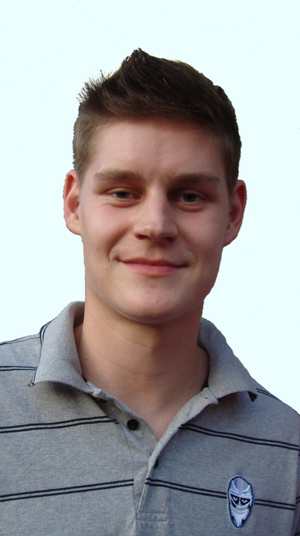
- Born: March 17, 1988 (age 37); Bad Muskau, East Germany
- Height: 6 ft 7 in (201 cm)
- Weight: 243 lb (110 kg; 17 st 5 lb)
- Position: Forward
- Shoots: Left
- DEL team (P) Cur. team Former teams: Hamburg Freezers; ETC Crimmitschau (2.GBun); Eisbären Berlin
- National team: Germany
- Playing career: 2005–present

Elia Ostwald (born March 17, 1988) is a German professional ice hockey forward who currently plays on loan with Eispiraten Crimmitschau of the 2.GBun from the Hamburg Freezers of the Deutsche Eishockey Liga (DEL) .

== Career statistics ==
=== Regular season and playoffs ===
			Regular season					Playoffs
Season	Team	League	GP	G	A	Pts	PIM	GP	G	A	Pts	PIM
2005–06	Lausitzer Füchse	2.GBun	20	0	1	1	2	—	—	—	—	—
2006–07	Eisbären Berlin	DEL	5	0	0	0	2	—	—	—	—	—
2006–07	Eisbären Junior Berlin	3.GBun	42	4	11	15	10	—	—	—	—	—
2007–08	Eisbären Berlin	DEL	30	2	2	4	14	14	0	1	1	2
2007–08	Eisbären Junior Berlin	3.GBun	24	5	13	18	61	—	—	—	—	—
2008–09	Hamburg Freezers	DEL	49	4	8	12	39	9	0	0	0	2
2009–10	Hamburg Freezers	DEL	56	6	9	15	28	—	—	—	—	—
2010–11	Hamburg Freezers	DEL	20	0	1	1	2	—	—	—	—	—
2010–11	ETC Crimmitschau	2.GBun	30	4	5	9	10	—	—	—	—	—
DEL totals			160	12	20	32	85	23	0	1	1	4

=== International ===
Year	Team	Comp	GP	G	A	Pts	PIM
2005	Germany	U17	5	0	0	0	4
2005	Germany	WJC18	6	1	1	2	0
2006	Germany	WJC18	6	2	2	4	0
2007	Germany	WJC	6	0	1	1	2
2008	Germany	WJC-D1	5	1	3	4	0
Junior int'l totals			28	4	7	11	6
