= Joonas Lehtivuori =

Finnish ice hockey player

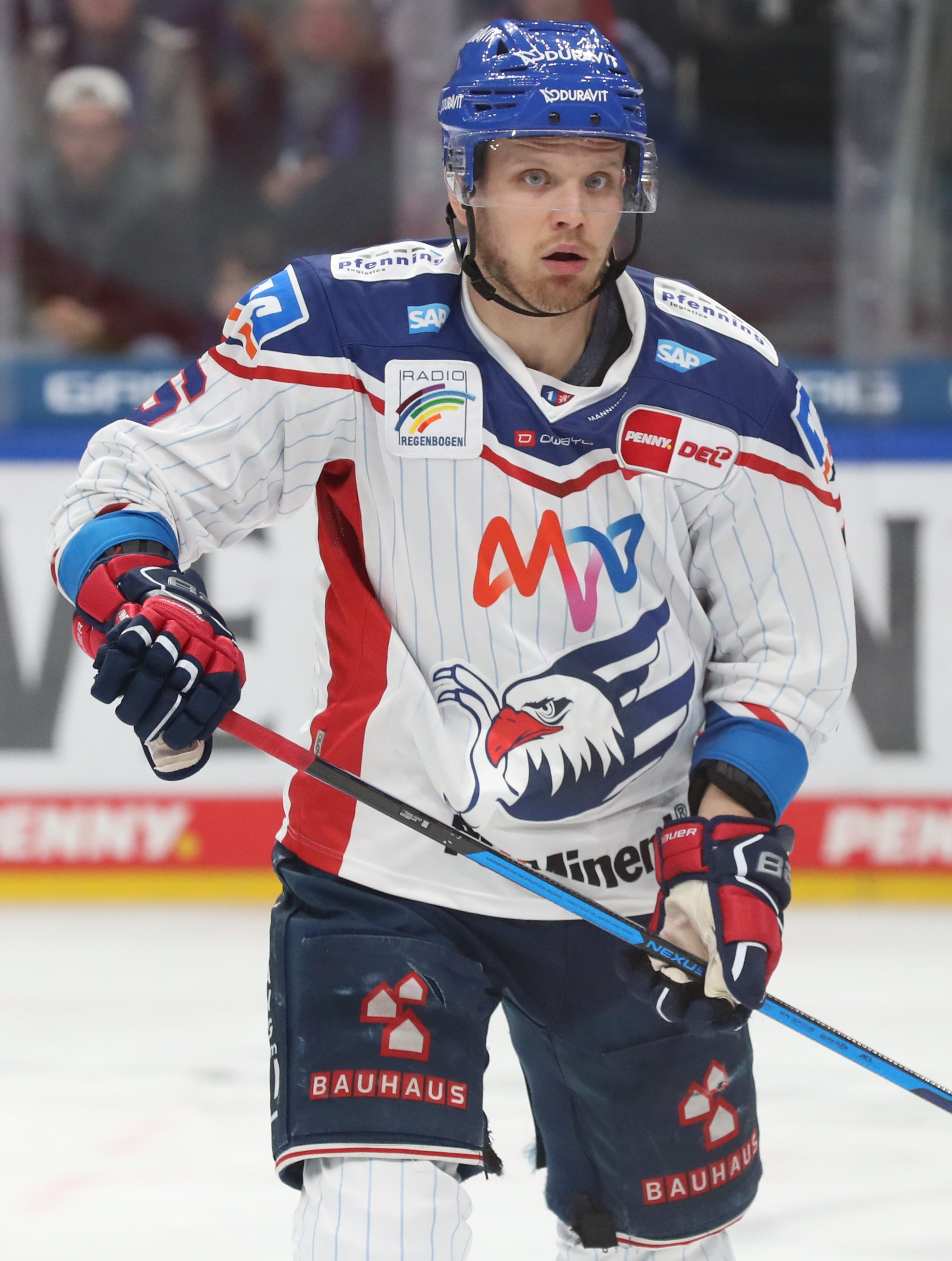
- Lehtivuori playing for Adler Mannheim in April 2022
- Born: July 19, 1988 (age 37) Tampere, Finland
- Height: 5 ft 11 in (180 cm)
- Weight: 167 lb (76 kg; 11 st 13 lb)
- Position: Defence
- Shoots: Left
- Liiga team Former teams: KooKoo; Ilves; Adirondack Phantoms; KalPa; Modo Hockey; HPK; Adler Mannheim
- NHL draft: 101st overall, 2006; Philadelphia Flyers
- Playing career: 2006–present

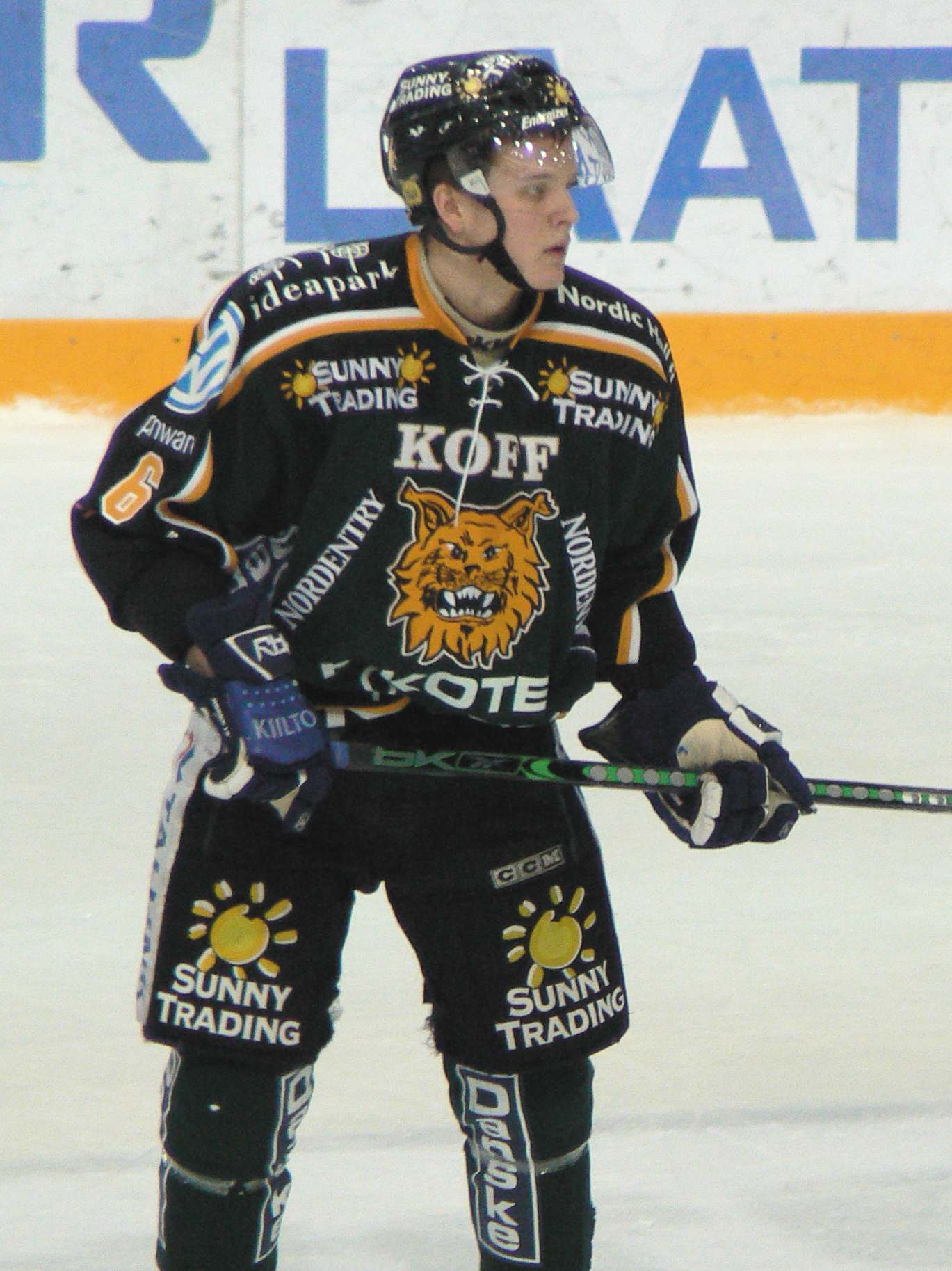
Lehtivuori playing for Ilves in 2008.

Joonas Lehtivuori (born July 19, 1988) is a Finnish professional ice hockey defenceman. He is currently playing for KooKoo of the Liiga. Lehtivuori was selected by the Philadelphia Flyers in the 4th round (101st overall) of the 2006 NHL entry draft.

== Playing career ==
Lehtivuori began his professional career with Ilves. He left Ilves on April 27, 2009, and joined the National Hockey League (NHL) club Philadelphia Flyers.

Lehtivuori did not play any games for the Philadelphia Flyers organization in the 2008–09 season. However, in the 2009–10 season, Lehtivuori was assigned to the Adirondack Phantoms, the Flyers' relocated team affiliate, of the American Hockey League (AHL). Playing in 66 games, he scored 5 goals and 23 points. Halfway through his second season with the Phantoms, Lehtivuori was loaned out to KalPa of the SM-liiga. On August 18, 2011, Lehtivuori signed a one-week try-out contract with the Modo Hockey of the Elitserien (SEL).

Lehtivuori played three seasons with HPK in the Liiga, before opting to leave as a free agent to sign a two-year contract with German outfit, Adler Mannheim of the DEL, on April 13, 2018.

== Career statistics ==
=== Regular season and playoffs ===
			Regular season					Playoffs
Season	Team	League	GP	G	A	Pts	PIM	GP	G	A	Pts	PIM
2004–05	Ilves	FIN U18	25	5	11	16	12	5	1	1	2	8
2005–06	Ilves	FIN U18	2	0	1	1	0	6	1	4	5	4
2005–06	Ilves	FIN U20	39	9	16	25	22	3	0	0	0	4
2005–06	Ilves	SM-liiga	1	0	0	0	0	—	—	—	—	—
2006–07	Ilves	FIN U20	15	3	8	11	51	5	0	1	1	2
2006–07	Ilves	SM-liiga	40	0	0	0	18	4	0	0	0	0
2006–07	Suomi U20	Mestis	2	0	0	0	0	—	—	—	—	—
2007–08	Ilves	SM-liiga	48	8	13	21	10	9	1	1	2	2
2007–08	Suomi U20	Mestis	2	0	1	1	2	—	—	—	—	—
2008–09	Ilves	SM-liiga	44	4	8	12	16	3	0	0	0	0
2009–10	Adirondack Phantoms	AHL	66	5	18	23	18	—	—	—	—	—
2010–11	Adirondack Phantoms	AHL	32	2	7	9	24	—	—	—	—	—
2010–11	KalPa	SM-liiga	19	0	2	2	14	4	0	1	1	2
2011–12	Modo Hockey	SEL	54	3	9	12	18	6	0	0	0	4
2012–13	Modo Hockey	SEL	55	3	15	18	16	5	0	0	0	2
2013–14	Modo Hockey	SHL	38	5	1	6	18	2	0	0	0	0
2014–15	Modo Hockey	SHL	52	3	4	7	40	—	—	—	—	—
2015–16	HPK	Liiga	27	2	4	6	28	—	—	—	—	—
2016–17	HPK	Liiga	56	7	18	25	22	7	2	4	6	16
2017–18	HPK	Liiga	52	8	26	34	26	—	—	—	—	—
2018–19	Adler Mannheim	DEL	41	8	23	31	26	14	0	3	3	12
2019–20	Adler Mannheim	DEL	45	3	17	20	22	—	—	—	—	—
2020–21	Adler Mannheim	DEL	28	4	12	16	14	—	—	—	—	—
2021–22	Adler Mannheim	DEL	46	2	20	22	32	9	0	4	4	0
2022–23	Adler Mannheim	DEL	17	1	5	6	8	10	0	1	1	12
Liiga totals			287	29	71	100	134	27	3	6	9	20
SHL totals			199	14	29	43	92	13	0	0	0	6
DEL totals			177	18	77	95	102	33	0	8	8	24

=== International ===
Year	Team	Event	Result	GP	G	A	Pts	PIM
2005	Finland	WHC17	6th	5	0	2	2	0
2005	Finland	U18	3rd place, bronze medalist(s)	5	0	1	1	4
2006	Finland	WJC18	2nd place, silver medalist(s)	6	1	2	3	12
2007	Finland	WJC	6th	6	0	0	0	4
2008	Finland	WJC	6th	6	0	1	1	6
Junior totals				28	1	6	7	26

== Awards and honours ==
Award	Year
DEL
Defenseman of the Year	2019
Champion (Adler Mannheim)	2019
