= Jamie McBain =

American ice hockey player (born 1988)

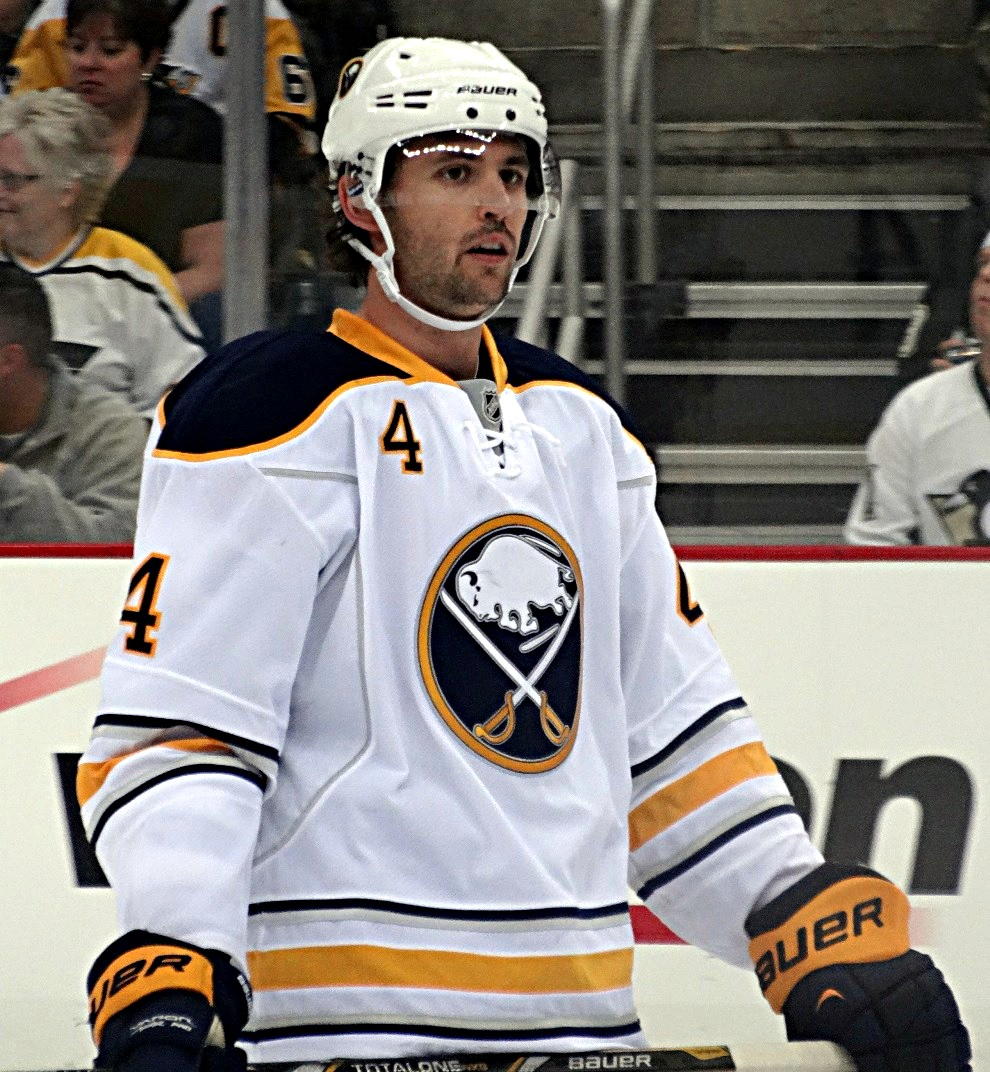
- McBain with the Buffalo Sabres in 2013
- Born: February 25, 1988 (age 38) Edina, Minnesota, U.S.
- Height: 6 ft 2 in (188 cm)
- Weight: 200 lb (91 kg; 14 st 4 lb)
- Position: Defense
- Shot: Right
- Played for: Carolina Hurricanes; Lahti Pelicans; Buffalo Sabres; Los Angeles Kings; Arizona Coyotes
- National team: United States
- NHL draft: 63rd overall, 2006; Carolina Hurricanes
- Playing career: 2010–2018

James Michael McBain (born February 25, 1988) is an American former professional ice hockey defenseman who played in the National Hockey League (NHL). McBain was born in Edina, Minnesota, but grew up in Faribault, Minnesota. He attended college at the University of Wisconsin-Madison.

== Playing career ==
McBain was drafted in the third round, 63rd overall, in the 2006 NHL entry draft by the Carolina Hurricanes. On March 26, 2009, he signed a three-year, $1.8 million, entry-level contract with the Hurricanes.

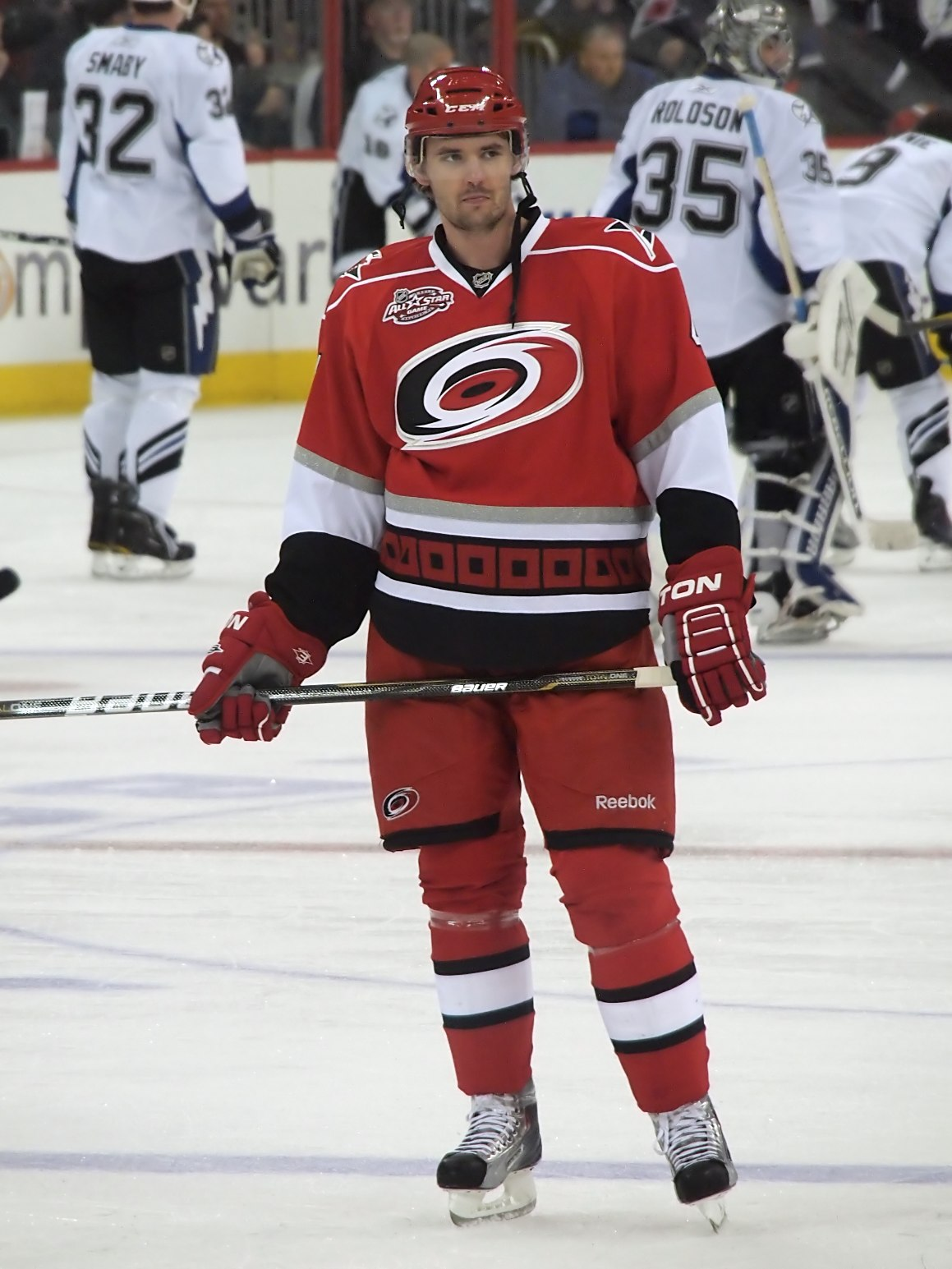
With the Hurricanes

McBain scored his first career NHL goal on March 20, 2010, with one second remaining in overtime against Marc-André Fleury of the Pittsburgh Penguins.

Upon the start of the 2010–11 season, McBain began wearing the number 4 jersey instead of number 28, which he had previously worn during the 2009–10 season. McBain was selected to participate in the 2011 NHL All-Star Game, as a replacement for Jordan Eberle. He played in the All-Star game along with teammates Eric Staal, Jeff Skinner, and Cam Ward.

On May 21, 2012, Carolina announced that McBain had agreed to a two-year contract extension worth US$3.6 million after an impressive season in which he led all Hurricanes defensemen with 19 assists and 27 points. The contract was structured so that McBain will make $1.7 million in 2012–13 and $1.9 million in 2013–14. In the statement announcing the contract extension, then-Hurricanes General Manager Jim Rutherford said, "Jamie is still a very young player who has established himself as an NHL defenseman. He moves the puck well and has shown that he can contribute offensively, especially on the power play."

During the 2012–13 NHL lockout, McBain signed a temporary contract with Finnish club Lahti Pelicans of the SM-liiga on November 2, 2012. He participated in seven games for the Pelicans for one assist before returning to North America for the shortened 2012–13 season.

On June 30, 2013, during the 2013 NHL entry draft, McBain was traded to the Buffalo Sabres, along with Carolina's second-round pick, in exchange for defenseman Andrej Sekera. After one season with the Sabres, the Sabres declined to offer him a contract extension.

As a free agent, McBain attended the Arizona Coyotes' training camp on a player-tryout offer, but was ultimately released by the team, unsigned. On October 31, 2014, McBain belatedly began the 2014–15 season by agreeing to a professional try-out contract with the Manchester Monarchs of the American Hockey League (AHL). After six games with the Monarchs, McBain was signed to a one-year, two-way contract with the team's NHL affiliate, the Los Angeles Kings, on November 11, 2014. McBain wore number 5 for Los Angeles.

On July 1, 2016, McBain signed as a free agent to a one-year, two-way contract with the Arizona Coyotes. He made the opening night roster for the Coyotes and appeared in 3 scoreless games to begin the 2016–17 season. He was then placed on waivers and assigned to AHL affiliate, the Tucson Roadrunners, for the remainder of the year. He contributed with 43 points in 64 games.

On July 1, 2017, McBain left the Coyotes as a free agent and signed a one-year, two-way contract with the Tampa Bay Lightning. After appearing at training camp, McBain was assigned to their AHL affiliate, the Syracuse Crunch, to start the season. McBain was made one of seven alternative captains for Syracuse at the beginning of the 2017–18 season.

== Personal ==
McBain married Elizabeth Milner on July 5, 2014, in North Carolina. Their son was born on November 2, 2015, in the Los Angeles area.

== Career statistics ==
=== Regular season and playoffs ===
			Regular season					Playoffs
Season	Team	League	GP	G	A	Pts	PIM	GP	G	A	Pts	PIM
2003–04	Shattuck–Saint Mary's	Midget	73	6	27	33	32	—	—	—	—	—
2004–05	U.S. NTDP U17	USDP	14	1	6	7	16	—	—	—	—	—
2004–05	U.S. NTDP Juniors	NAHL	38	2	7	9	22	10	0	3	3	4
2005–06	U.S. NTDP U18	USDP	41	9	16	25	35	—	—	—	—	—
2005–06	U.S. NTDP U18	NAHL	14	0	5	5	6	—	—	—	—	—
2006–07	University of Wisconsin	WCHA	36	3	15	18	36	—	—	—	—	—
2007–08	University of Wisconsin	WCHA	35	5	19	24	18	—	—	—	—	—
2008–09	University of Wisconsin	WCHA	40	7	30	37	30	—	—	—	—	—
2008–09	Albany River Rats	AHL	10	1	1	2	2	—	—	—	—	—
2009–10	Albany River Rats	AHL	68	7	33	40	10	8	4	2	6	8
2009–10	Carolina Hurricanes	NHL	14	3	7	10	0	—	—	—	—	—
2010–11	Carolina Hurricanes	NHL	76	7	23	30	32	—	—	—	—	—
2011–12	Carolina Hurricanes	NHL	76	8	19	27	4	—	—	—	—	—
2012–13	Pelicans	SM-l	7	0	1	1	6	—	—	—	—	—
2012–13	Carolina Hurricanes	NHL	40	1	7	8	12	—	—	—	—	—
2013–14	Buffalo Sabres	NHL	69	6	11	17	14	—	—	—	—	—
2014–15	Manchester Monarchs	AHL	5	1	2	3	2	—	—	—	—	—
2014–15	Los Angeles Kings	NHL	26	3	6	9	4	—	—	—	—	—
2015–16	Ontario Reign	AHL	3	1	1	2	0	—	—	—	—	—
2015–16	Los Angeles Kings	NHL	44	2	7	9	6	4	0	0	0	2
2016–17	Arizona Coyotes	NHL	3	0	0	0	0	—	—	—	—	—
2016–17	Tucson Roadrunners	AHL	64	8	35	43	48	—	—	—	—	—
2017–18	Syracuse Crunch	AHL	60	5	19	24	30	7	1	3	4	0
AHL totals			210	23	91	114	92	15	5	5	10	8
NHL totals			348	30	80	110	72	4	0	0	0	2

=== International ===
Medal record

Representing the United States

Ice hockey

Ice Hockey World Championships
Bronze medal – third place	2013 Sweden/Finland	

World Junior Championships
Bronze medal – third place	2007 Mora	

Year	Team	Event	Result	GP	G	A	Pts	PIM
2005	United States	U17	5th	5	1	3	4	4
2006	United States	WJC18	1st place, gold medalist(s)	6	2	9	11	0
2007	United States	WJC	3rd place, bronze medalist(s)	7	0	0	0	2
2008	United States	WJC	4th	6	0	1	1	0
2013	United States	WC	3rd place, bronze medalist(s)	10	0	2	2	2
Junior totals				24	3	13	16	6
Senior totals				10	0	2	2	2

== Awards and honors ==
Award	Year
College
All-WCHA Rookie Team	2006–07
All-WCHA Third Team	2007–08
All-WCHA First Team	2008–09
AHCA West First-Team All-American	2008–09

Awards and achievements
Preceded by Richard Bachman	WCHA Player of the Year; 2008–09	Succeeded by Marc Cheverie
