= Ryan Flynn =

Ryan Flynn may refer to:

- Ryan Flynn (footballer) (born 1988), Scottish footballer
- Ryan Flynn (ice hockey) (born 1988), American ice hockey player
- Ryan Flynn, fictional character in the 2004 film The Dust Factory
