= Lukáš Zeliska =

Slovak ice hockey player

Lukas Zeliska
- Born: 8 October 1988 (age 37) Třinec, Czechoslovakia
- Height: 6 ft 0 in (183 cm)
- Weight: 212 lb (96 kg; 15 st 2 lb)
- Position: Centre
- Shoots: Left
- FFHG Division 3 team Former teams: Graoullys de Metz; HC Oceláři Třinec; MHC Martin
- NHL draft: 204th overall, 2006; New York Rangers
- Playing career: 2006–present

Lukas Zeliska (born 8 January 1988) is a Slovak professional ice hockey player who is currently under contract with Graoullys de Metz in the FFHG Division 3 in France. He previously played in the Czech Extraliga with HC Oceláři Třinec. He was selected by the New York Rangers in the 7th round (204th overall) of the 2006 NHL entry draft.

== Career statistics ==
=== Regular season and playoffs ===
			Regular season					Playoffs
Season	Team	League	GP	G	A	Pts	PIM	GP	G	A	Pts	PIM
2003–04	HC Oceláři Třinec	CZE U18	48	39	41	80	168	5	2	2	4	4
2003–04	HC Oceláři Třinec	CZE U20	7	1	1	2	2	—	—	—	—	—
2004–05	HC Oceláři Třinec	CZE U18	11	7	11	18	40	—	—	—	—	—
2004–05	HC Oceláři Třinec	CZE U20	13	1	2	3	6	—	—	—	—	—
2005–06	HC Oceláři Třinec	CZE U20	29	8	3	11	81	7	4	1	5	22
2005–06	HC Oceláři Třinec	ELH	1	0	0	0	0	—	—	—	—	—
2006–07	Prince Albert Raiders	WHL	61	4	25	29	77	5	4	1	5	4
2007–08	HC Oceláři Třinec	CZE U20	38	23	29	52	236	7	2	4	6	10
2008–09	HC Oceláři Třinec	ELH	14	0	0	0	0	—	—	—	—	—
2007–08	HC Havířov Panthers	CZE.2	32	10	5	15	52	4	0	1	1	6
2009–10	HC Havířov Panthers	CZE.2	28	4	5	9	26	—	—	—	—	—
2009–10	MHC Martin	SVK	13	1	0	1	2	12	0	0	0	0
2009–10	MHK Dolný Kubín	SVK.2	1	1	1	2	0	—	—	—	—	—
2010–11	MHK Dolný Kubín	SVK.2	17	8	10	18	22	—	—	—	—	—
2010–11	MHC Mountfield Martin	SVK	37	0	10	10	22	—	—	—	—	—
2011–12	MHC Mountfield Martin	SVK	44	7	5	12	16	—	—	—	—	—
2012–13	Boxers de Bordeaux	FRA.2	24	12	15	27	50	4	0	0	0	4
2013–14	Boxers de Bordeaux	FRA.2	26	13	25	38	18	9	3	4	7	14
2014–15	Boxers de Bordeaux	FRA.2	24	4	11	15	12	6	3	6	9	29
2015–16	Anglet Hormadi Élite	FRA.2	26	16	19	35	16	11	2	5	7	8
2016–17	Dogs de Cholet	FRA.2	24	9	8	17	12	2	2	2	4	2
2017–18	Corsaires de Dunkerque	FRA.2	26	5	6	11	12	—	—	—	—	—
2018–19	MHC Martin	SVK.2	43	18	19	37	18	16	0	3	3	4
2019–20	MHC Martin	SVK.2	13	1	3	4	16	—	—	—	—	—
2020–21	HC Metz	FRA.4	1	1	1	2	0	—	—	—	—	—
2021–22	HC Metz	FRA.4	10	9	6	15	20	4	5	6	11	8
2022–23	HC Metz	FRA.4	12	14	22	36	10	4	9	5	14	4
ELH totals			15	0	0	0	0	—	—	—	—	—
SVK.2 totals			74	28	33	61	56	16	0	3	3	4
FRA.2 totals			150	59	84	143	120	32	10	17	27	57

=== International ===
Year	Team	Event	GP	G	A	Pts	PIM
2005	Slovakia	U17	5	1	1	2	8
2006	Slovakia	WJC18	6	1	1	2	10
Junior totals			11	2	2	4	18
