= François Bouchard (ice hockey, born 1988) =

Canadian ice hockey player

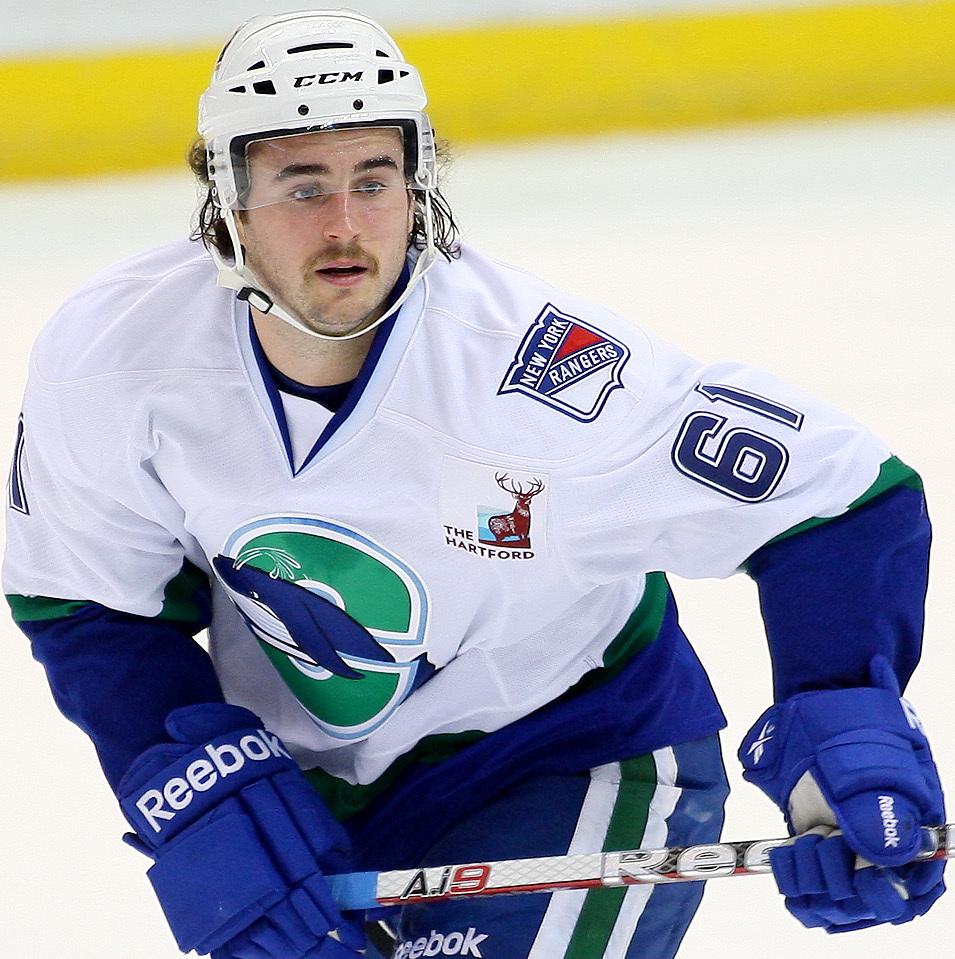
- Bouchard with the Connecticut Whale in 2011
- Born: April 26, 1988 (age 38) Sherbrooke, Quebec, Canada
- Height: 6 ft 0 in (183 cm)
- Weight: 188 lb (85 kg; 13 st 6 lb)
- Position: Right wing
- Shot: Left
- team Former teams: Free Agent; Hershey Bears; Connecticut Whale; KHL Medveščak Zagreb; IK Oskarshamn; Södertälje SK; HC Pustertal Wölfe; Boxers de Bordeaux; Dundee Stars
- NHL draft: 35th overall, 2006; Washington Capitals
- Playing career: 2008–2022

François Bouchard (born April 26, 1988) is a Canadian professional ice hockey player who is currently an unrestricted free agent. He most recently played for Les Pétroliers du Nord in the Ligue Nord-Américaine de Hockey (LNAH). He is the younger brother of Pierre-Marc Bouchard who also played in the NHL.

== Playing career ==
Bouchard was drafted in the second round, 35th overall in the 2006 NHL entry draft by the Washington Capitals. During the 2006–07 QMJHL season, Bouchard led the league in points with 125 for Baie-Comeau Drakkar.

On July 15, 2011, Bouchard signed a one-year contract with the Washington Capitals. In the preceding 2011–12 season, on November 8, 2011, Bouchard was traded to the New York Rangers in exchange for Tomas Kundratek.

On December 18, 2012, Bouchard joined to the KHL Medvescak in Austrian Hockey League (EBEL). On June 7, 2013, Bouchard signed a contract with Swedish team IK Oskarshamn in HockeyAllsvenskan.

Bouchard has since had spells with Södertälje SK, HC Pustertal Wölfe, Boxers de Bordeaux and Dundee Stars.

== Career statistics ==
=== Regular season and playoffs ===
			Regular season					Playoffs
Season	Team	League	GP	G	A	Pts	PIM	GP	G	A	Pts	PIM
2003–04	Collège Charles–Lemoyne	QMAAA	11	1	1	2	6	1	0	0	0	0
2004–05	Baie–Comeau Drakkar	QMJHL	54	11	13	24	13	6	1	1	2	2
2005–06	Baie–Comeau Drakkar	QMJHL	69	33	69	102	66	4	1	0	1	6
2006–07	Baie-Comeau Drakkar	QMJHL	68	45	80	125	72	11	7	11	18	4
2007–08	Baie-Comeau Drakkar	QMJHL	68	36	56	92	70	5	1	1	2	8
2007–08	Hershey Bears	AHL	4	1	0	1	2	1	0	0	0	2
2008–09	Hershey Bears	AHL	64	14	20	34	34	11	1	2	3	8
2009–10	Hershey Bears	AHL	77	21	31	52	55	21	5	5	10	28
2010–11	Hershey Bears	AHL	74	12	12	24	30	6	1	0	1	0
2011–12	Hershey Bears	AHL	9	0	0	0	8	—	—	—	—	—
2011–12	Connecticut Whale	AHL	34	3	7	10	20	—	—	—	—	—
2012–13	Cincinnati Cyclones	ECHL	20	5	6	11	16	—	—	—	—	—
2012–13	KHL Medveščak Zagreb	AUT	19	4	8	12	12	—	—	—	—	—
2013–14	IK Oskarshamn	Allsv	50	18	15	33	48	—	—	—	—	—
2014–15	Södertälje SK	Allsv	47	7	3	10	28	—	—	—	—	—
2015–16	HC Pustertal Wölfe	ITA	42	34	29	63	40	15	5	13	18	14
2016–17	Boxers de Bordeaux	FRA	44	13	27	40	51	11	2	2	4	6
2018–19	Dundee Stars	EIHL	39	14	21	35	16	—	—	—	—	—
2019–20	Les Pétroliers du Nord	LNAH	34	13	31	44	18	—	—	—	—	—
2021–22	Les Pétroliers du Nord	LNAH	20	7	19	26	20	15	1	6	7	12
AHL totals			261	51	70	121	147	39	7	7	14	38

=== International ===
Year	Team	Event	GP	G	A	Pts	PIM
2005	Canada Quebec	U17	5	2	3	5	2
2006	Canada	WJC18	7	3	5	8	6
Junior totals			12	5	8	13	8
