= Chris Summers (ice hockey) =

American ice hockey player (born 1988)

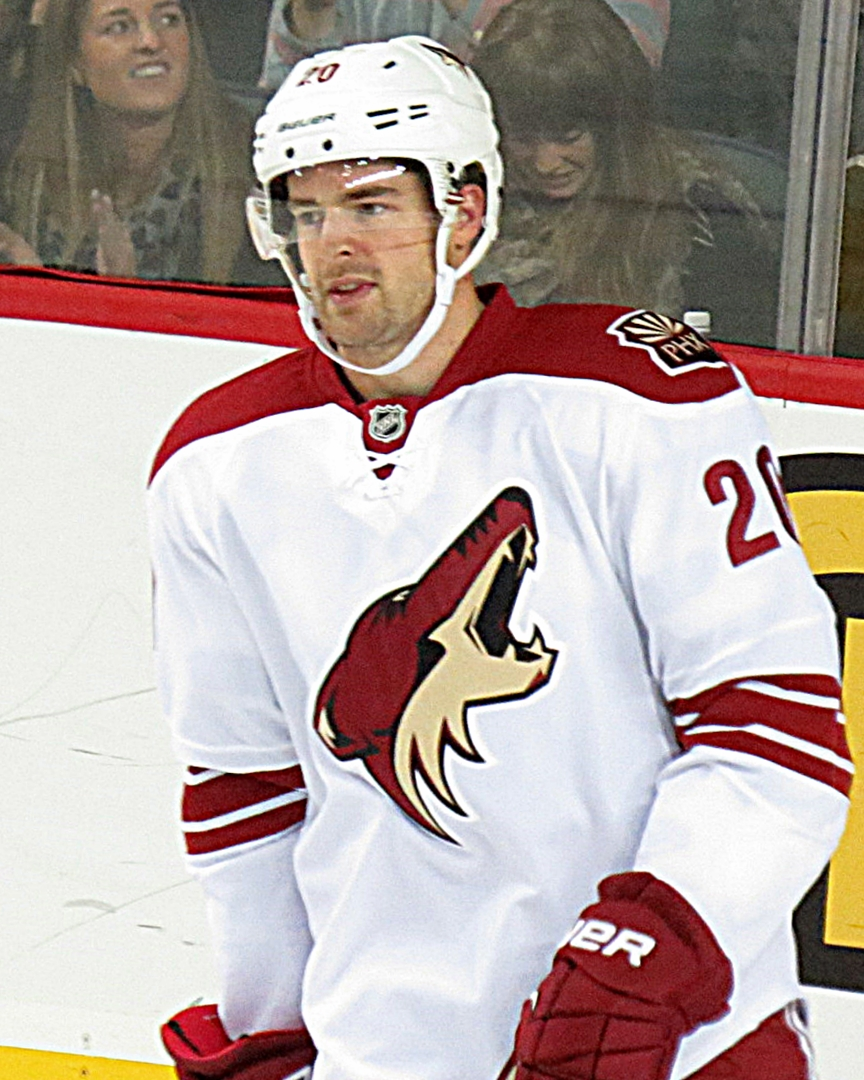
- Summers with the Phoenix Coyotes in 2014
- Born: February 5, 1988 (age 38) Ann Arbor, Michigan, U.S.
- Height: 6 ft 2 in (188 cm)
- Weight: 205 lb (93 kg; 14 st 9 lb)
- Position: Defense
- Shot: Left
- Played for: Arizona Coyotes; New York Rangers; Thomas Sabo Ice Tigers
- NHL draft: 29th overall, 2006; Phoenix Coyotes
- Playing career: 2010–2020

Christopher C. Summers (born February 5, 1988) is an American former professional ice hockey defenseman who played in the National Hockey League (NHL) with the Arizona Coyotes and New York Rangers. He played out his career with the Thomas Sabo Ice Tigers of the Deutsche Eishockey Liga (DEL).

== Playing career ==
As a youth, Summers played in the 2002 Quebec International Pee-Wee Hockey Tournament with the Detroit Honeybaked minor ice hockey team.

A native of Milan, Michigan, graduating Milan High School in 2006, Summers was drafted by the Phoenix Coyotes in the first round, 29th overall, in the 2006 NHL entry draft. Drafted from the USA Hockey National Team Development Program in Ann Arbor, Summers was recruited to play collegiate hockey with the University of Michigan. During the 2008–09 season, Summers was named an Alternate Captain for the Wolverines, but was promoted to co-captain after Mark Mitera was injured. The following season, his last season with the Wolverines, Summers was named team captain.

After his senior year in 2009–10, Summers signed a two-year entry-level contract with the Coyotes on March 31, 2010. He was then assigned to AHL affiliate, the San Antonio Rampage on an amateur try out contract for the remainder of the season.

During the 2013–14 season, Summers scored his first NHL goal on March 15, 2014, against Joni Ortio of the Calgary Flames.

On March 1, 2015, Summers was included in a trade by the Coyotes to the New York Rangers along with defenseman Keith Yandle and a 2015 fourth round pick in exchange for defenseman John Moore, Anthony Duclair, and two draft picks (2016 first round and 2015 second round).

On April 20, 2016, Summers was recalled by the New York Rangers from the team's AHL affiliate, the Hartford Wolf Pack.

On July 1, 2017, Summers left the Rangers as a free agent and signed a two-year, two-way $650,000 contract with the Pittsburgh Penguins. Summers played the duration of his contract exclusively with AHL affiliate, the Wilkes-Barre/Scranton Penguins.

As a free agent from the Penguins, Summers signed his first contract abroad, agreeing to a two-year deal with German club, Thomas Sabo Ice Tigers of the DEL, on July 24, 2019.

== Career statistics ==
=== Regular season and playoffs ===
			Regular season					Playoffs
Season	Team	League	GP	G	A	Pts	PIM	GP	G	A	Pts	PIM
2004–05	U.S. NTDP U17	USDP	13	2	2	4	10	—	—	—	—	—
2004–05	U.S. NTDP U18	USDP	1	0	1	1	0	—	—	—	—	—
2004–05	U.S. NTDP Juniors	NAHL	31	2	5	7	20	7	1	0	1	0
2005–06	U.S. NTDP U18	USDP	42	4	9	13	67	—	—	—	—	—
2005–06	U.S. NTDP U18	NAHL	17	2	2	4	20	—	—	—	—	—
2006–07	University of Michigan	CCHA	41	6	8	14	58	—	—	—	—	—
2007–08	University of Michigan	CCHA	41	2	11	13	65	—	—	—	—	—
2008–09	University of Michigan	CCHA	41	4	13	17	40	—	—	—	—	—
2009–10	University of Michigan	CCHA	40	4	12	16	28	—	—	—	—	—
2009–10	San Antonio Rampage	AHL	6	1	0	1	0	—	—	—	—	—
2010–11	San Antonio Rampage	AHL	75	1	9	10	54	—	—	—	—	—
2010–11	Phoenix Coyotes	NHL	2	0	0	0	4	—	—	—	—	—
2011–12	Portland Pirates	AHL	28	0	2	2	37	—	—	—	—	—
2011–12	Phoenix Coyotes	NHL	21	0	3	3	11	—	—	—	—	—
2012–13	Portland Pirates	AHL	60	2	10	12	53	3	0	0	0	0
2012–13	Phoenix Coyotes	NHL	6	0	0	0	9	—	—	—	—	—
2013–14	Portland Pirates	AHL	48	2	7	9	47	—	—	—	—	—
2013–14	Phoenix Coyotes	NHL	18	2	1	3	15	—	—	—	—	—
2014–15	Arizona Coyotes	NHL	17	0	3	3	8	—	—	—	—	—
2014–15	Portland Pirates	AHL	7	0	1	1	6	—	—	—	—	—
2014–15	Hartford Wolf Pack	AHL	13	0	1	1	17	—	—	—	—	—
2014–15	New York Rangers	NHL	3	0	0	0	0	—	—	—	—	—
2015–16	Hartford Wolf Pack	AHL	74	3	8	11	51	—	—	—	—	—
2015–16	New York Rangers	NHL	3	0	0	0	4	—	—	—	—	—
2016–17	Hartford Wolf Pack	AHL	74	4	8	12	71	—	—	—	—	—
2017–18	Wilkes–Barre/Scranton Penguins	AHL	64	1	10	11	51	3	0	0	0	4
2018–19	Wilkes–Barre/Scranton Penguins	AHL	59	3	13	16	54	—	—	—	—	—
2019–20	Thomas Sabo Ice Tigers	DEL	52	1	8	9	34	—	—	—	—	—
AHL totals			509	17	69	86	441	6	0	0	0	4
NHL totals			70	2	7	9	51	—	—	—	—	—

=== International ===
Year	Team	Event	Result	GP	G	A	Pts	PIM
2005	United States	U17	5th	5	2	0	2	2
2006	United States	WJC18	1st place, gold medalist(s)	6	1	0	1	37
2008	United States	WJC	4th	6	0	1	1	2
Junior totals				17	3	1	4	41

Awards and achievements
Preceded by Peter Mueller	Phoenix Coyotes first-round draft pick 2006	Succeeded by Kyle Turris
