= Max Wärn =

Finnish ice hockey player

- Born: 10 June 1988 (age 38) Helsinki, Finland
- Height: 6 ft 2 in (188 cm)
- Weight: 207 lb (94 kg; 14 st 11 lb)
- Position: Right wing
- Shot: Left
- Played for: HIFK; HPK; Lahti Pelicans; JYP Jyväskylä; HC Sochi; Kunlun Red Star; HV71; Jokerit; Lausanne HC
- NHL draft: 150th overall, 2006; Dallas Stars
- Playing career: 2006–2020

Max Wärn (born 10 June 1988) is a Finnish former professional ice hockey forward who played extensively in Europe.

== Playing career ==
Wärn first played as a youth and senior level with HIFK in the Finnish SM-liiga. He was selected by the Dallas Stars in the 5th round (150th overall) of the 2006 NHL entry draft. After two seasons with JYP in the Liiga. Wärn left his native Finland to sign a one-year contract with Russian expansion club, HC Sochi of the KHL on 21 May 2014.

Wärn played just two games in the 2019–20 season with Swiss National League club, Lausanne HC, before he was released from his 1-month contract. On 14 February 2020, Wärn confirmed his retirement from professional hockey after 14 seasons.

== Career statistics ==
=== Regular season and playoffs ===
			Regular season					Playoffs
Season	Team	League	GP	G	A	Pts	PIM	GP	G	A	Pts	PIM
2004–05	HIFK	FIN U18	22	6	9	15	30	7	1	3	4	4
2004–05	HIFK	FIN U20	4	0	0	0	0	2	0	0	0	0
2005–06	HIFK	FIN U18	7	5	4	9	6	7	4	2	6	6
2005–06	HIFK	FIN U20	24	3	10	13	39	—	—	—	—	—
2006–07	HIFK	FIN U20	13	5	6	11	10	10	4	6	10	6
2006–07	HIFK	SM-liiga	1	0	0	0	0	—	—	—	—	—
2007–08	HIFK	FIN U20	14	3	3	6	12	—	—	—	—	—
2007–08	HIFK	SM-liiga	23	0	0	0	4	5	0	0	0	0
2007–08	HPK	SM-liiga	4	0	0	0	0	—	—	—	—	—
2007–08	Kiekko–Vantaa	Mestis	1	2	0	2	0	—	—	—	—	—
2007–08	Suomi U20	Mestis	4	0	0	0	4	—	—	—	—	—
2008–09	HIFK	SM-liiga	51	5	11	16	26	2	0	0	0	0
2009–10	HIFK	SM-liiga	35	5	6	11	43	3	0	0	0	0
2009–10	Kiekko–Vantaa	Mestis	4	2	1	3	2	—	—	—	—	—
2010–11	HIFK	SM-liiga	43	6	6	12	31	10	1	2	3	6
2010–11	Kiekko–Vantaa	Mestis	1	0	0	0	2	—	—	—	—	—
2011–12	Pelicans	SM-liiga	35	9	7	16	39	17	2	0	2	8
2012–13	JYP	SM-liiga	46	7	5	12	14	10	4	4	8	8
2013–14	JYP	Liiga	60	14	21	35	44	4	1	3	4	4
2014–15	HC Sochi	KHL	60	12	7	19	43	4	0	0	0	0
2015–16	HC Sochi	KHL	43	3	8	11	27	4	0	0	0	0
2016–17	Kunlun Red Star	KHL	32	10	7	17	28	5	0	1	1	2
2017–18	HV71	SHL	49	10	8	18	16	2	1	1	2	4
2018–19	Jokerit	KHL	25	4	0	4	20	—	—	—	—	—
2019–20	Lausanne HC	NL	2	0	0	0	2	—	—	—	—	—
Liiga totals			298	46	56	102	201	51	8	9	17	26
KHL totals			160	29	22	51	118	13	0	1	1	2

=== International ===
Year	Team	Event	GP	G	A	Pts	PIM
2005	Finland	WJC18	6	1	1	2	16
2006	Finland	WJC18	5	2	1	3	6
2008	Finland	WJC	6	1	1	2	6
Junior totals			17	4	3	7	28
