= Andrei Popov (ice hockey) =

Russian ice hockey player

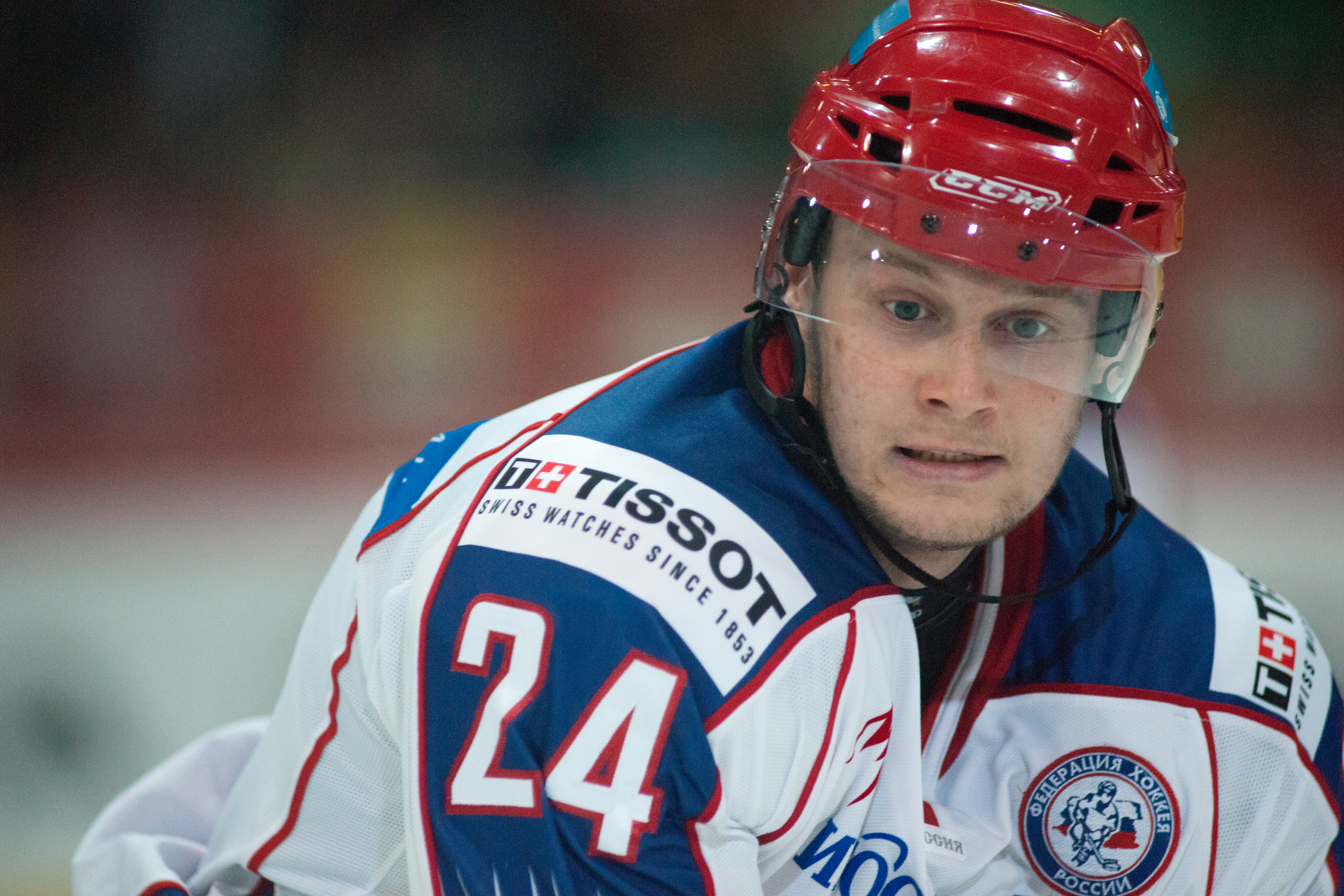
- Born: 15 July 1988 (age 37) Chelyabinsk, Russian SFSR, USSR
- Height: 6 ft 0 in (183 cm)
- Weight: 187 lb (85 kg; 13 st 5 lb)
- Position: Right wing
- Shoots: Left
- KHL team Former teams: Free Agent; Traktor Chelyabinsk; Ak Bars Kazan
- NHL draft: 205th overall, 2006; Philadelphia Flyers
- Playing career: 2003–present

Andrei Vladislavovich Popov (Russian: Андрей Владиславович Попов; born 15 July 1988) is a Russian professional ice hockey right winger who is currently an unrestricted free agent. He most recently played for Traktor Chelyabinsk of the Kontinental Hockey League (KHL).

== Playing career ==
Popov was selected by the Philadelphia Flyers in the 7th round (205th overall) of the 2006 NHL entry draft. He made his professional debut with Traktor Chelyabinsk in the Russian Superleague during the 2006–07 season.

Popov spent the entirety of his first 13 seasons of his career within Traktor Chelyabinsk, before leaving as a free agent following the 2015–16 season. On June 1, 2016, Popov agreed to an initial two-year contract to continue in the KHL with Ak Bars Kazan.

After helping Ak Bars claim the Gagarin Cup in 2018, Popov left after three seasons and returned to original club, Traktor Chelyabinsk, on a one-year contract on 10 July 2019.

== Career statistics ==
=== Regular season and playoffs ===
			Regular season					Playoffs
Season	Team	League	GP	G	A	Pts	PIM	GP	G	A	Pts	PIM
2003–04	Traktor–2 Chelyabinsk	RUS.3	6	3	0	3	4	—	—	—	—	—
2004–05	Traktor–2 Chelyabinsk	RUS.3	18	6	2	8	6	—	—	—	—	—
2005–06	Traktor Chelyabinsk	RUS.2	37	8	8	16	26	5	2	0	2	2
2005–06	Traktor–2 Chelyabinsk	RUS.3	2	1	4	5	0	—	—	—	—	—
2006–07	Traktor Chelyabinsk	RSL	44	2	10	12	36	—	—	—	—	—
2006–07	Traktor–2 Chelyabinsk	RUS.3	4	1	1	2	0	—	—	—	—	—
2007–08	Traktor Chelyabinsk	RSL	33	5	2	7	12	2	0	0	0	4
2007–08	Traktor–2 Chelyabinsk	RUS.3	11	6	4	10	8	—	—	—	—	—
2008–09	Traktor Chelyabinsk	KHL	54	4	5	9	38	3	0	0	0	0
2008–09	Traktor–2 Chelyabinsk	RUS.3	5	1	3	4	0	—	—	—	—	—
2009–10	Traktor Chelyabinsk	KHL	50	15	11	26	24	4	0	1	1	2
2009–10	Belye Medvedi	MHL	5	6	6	12	4	9	5	9	14	8
2010–11	Traktor Chelyabinsk	KHL	54	10	13	23	30	—	—	—	—	—
2011–12	Traktor Chelyabinsk	KHL	54	6	10	16	38	16	5	1	6	4
2012–13	Traktor Chelyabinsk	KHL	51	7	6	13	14	21	3	1	4	4
2013–14	Traktor Chelyabinsk	KHL	50	11	8	19	14	—	—	—	—	—
2014–15	Traktor Chelyabinsk	KHL	51	18	12	30	14	6	1	1	2	0
2015–16	Traktor Chelyabinsk	KHL	55	13	12	25	20	—	—	—	—	—
2016–17	Ak Bars Kazan	KHL	59	11	4	15	24	13	2	2	4	18
2017–18	Ak Bars Kazan	KHL	18	4	2	6	4	2	0	0	0	0
2018–19	Ak Bars Kazan	KHL	44	2	4	6	8	2	0	0	0	0
2018–19	Bars Kazan	VHL	3	1	3	4	0	—	—	—	—	—
2019–20	Traktor Chelyabinsk	KHL	39	5	3	8	16	—	—	—	—	—
2022–23	Dubai White Bears	UAE	7	4	7	11	10	2	2	0	2	2
RSL totals			77	7	12	19	48	2	0	0	0	4
KHL totals			579	106	91	197	244	67	11	6	17	28

=== International ===
Year	Team	Event	Result	GP	G	A	Pts	PIM
2005	Russia	U18	4th	5	1	3	4	0
2006	Russia	WJC18	5th	6	3	2	5	8
Junior totals				11	4	5	9	8

== Awards and honours ==
Award	Year
KHL
Gagarin Cup (Ak Bars Kazan)	2018
