= Ruslan Bashkirov =

- Born: 7 March 1989 (age 37) Moscow, U.S.S.R.
- Height: 5 ft 11 in (180 cm)
- Weight: 182 lb (83 kg; 13 st 0 lb)
- Position: Left wing
- Shot: Left
- Played for: Amur Khabarovsk; Khimik Moscow Oblast; Lada Togliatti
- NHL draft: 60th overall, 2007; Ottawa Senators
- Playing career: 2007–2016

Ruslan Bashkirov (born March 7, 1989) is a Russian former professional ice hockey player. Bashkirov was most recently a member of Amur Khabarovsk of the Russian KHL. On June 23, 2007, he was drafted in the second round, 60th overall, by the Ottawa Senators in the 2007 NHL entry draft held in Columbus, Ohio, but did not sign with Ottawa. He is the twin brother of ice hockey player Roman Bashkirov.

== Playing career ==
In the 2005–06 season, he played for the HC Spartak Moscow in the Russian Super League. In 2006–07, he was drafted by the Quebec Remparts of the Quebec Major Junior Hockey League. Scouts reported that he has an impressive scoring touch, and they were also impressed with his aggressiveness and competitiveness. Ruslan played with his brother Roman in Quebec. Ruslan was drafted by the Ottawa Senators in the second round of the 2007 Draft but Roman was not. Unable to play together, Ruslan and Roman returned to Russia, where they both played mostly in the Russian minor leagues. Since that time, the Ottawa Senators have not drafted any Russians in the NHL Entry Draft.

Since 2007, Bashkirov has played for Kristall Elektrostal, Khimik Mytischy in 2007–08, and HK Rys and HC Lada Togliatti in 2008–09. He retired in 2016.

== Career statistics ==
=== Regular season and playoffs ===
			Regular season					Playoffs
Season	Team	League	GP	G	A	Pts	PIM	GP	G	A	Pts	PIM
2005–06	Spartak-2 Moscow	RUS-3	35	16	9	25	44	—	—	—	—	—
2006–07	Quebec Remparts	QMJHL	64	30	37	67	117	5	1	3	4	6
2007–08	Kristall Elektrostal	RUS-2	12	4	0	4	22	—	—	—	—	—
2007–08	Khimik Moscow Oblast	RSL	4	0	0	0	0	—	—	—	—	—
2007–08	Khimik-2 Moscow Oblast	RUS-3	29	22	16	38	26	—	—	—	—	—
2008–09	Lada Togliatti	KHL	2	0	0	0	2	—	—	—	—	—
2008–09	Lada-2 Togliatti	RUS-3	6	3	3	6	6	—	—	—	—	—
2008–09	Rys Podolsk	RUS-2	48	9	8	17	20	3	1	3	4	2
2009–10	Oktan Perm	RUS-3	2	4	2	6	0	—	—	—	—	—
2009–10	Molot-Prikamye Perm	RUS-2	37	10	8	18	12	10	2	3	5	4
2010–11	Molot-Prikamye Perm	VHL	8	1	0	1	2	—	—	—	—	—
2010–11	HC Ryazan	VHL	28	8	10	18	12	3	0	0	0	12
2011–12	HC Ryazan	VHL	20	5	5	10	14	—	—	—	—	—
2012–13	HC Ryazan	VHL	17	7	2	9	4	—	—	—	—	—
2013–14	HC Ryazan	VHL	48	19	27	46	16	—	—	—	—	—
2014–15	Amur Khabarovsk	KHL	46	6	4	10	41	—	—	—	—	—
2015–16	Amur Khabarovsk	KHL	20	2	0	2	8	—	—	—	—	—
2015–16	Buran Voronezh	VHL	17	4	3	7	14	—	—	—	—	—
KHL totals			68	8	4	12	51	—	—	—	—	—

=== International ===
Year	Team	Event	Result	GP	G	A	Pts	PIM
2006	Russia	WJC18	5th	6	6	2	8	4
Junior totals				6	6	2	8	4

== Awards and honours ==
Award	Year
CHL
Top Prospects Game MVP	2007
