= Ryan Flynn (ice hockey) =

American ice hockey player

- Born: March 22, 1988 (age 38) Saint Paul, Minnesota, U.S.
- Height: 6 ft 3 in (191 cm)
- Weight: 209 lb (95 kg; 14 st 13 lb)
- Position: Right wing
- Shot: Left
- Played for: Milwaukee Admirals; HC Bolzano; Ilves
- NHL draft: 176th overall, 2006; Nashville Predators
- Playing career: 2010–2014

Ryan Flynn (born March 22, 1988) is an American former professional ice hockey player. He most notably played with Ilves of the Finnish Liiga. He was selected by the Nashville Predators in the 6th round (176th overall) of the 2006 NHL entry draft.

== Early life ==
Flynn was born in Saint Paul, Minnesota. Prior to turning professional, he attended the University of Minnesota, where he played four seasons with the Minnesota Golden Gophers men's ice hockey team.

== Career ==
Flynn began his professional career with the Milwaukee Admirals of the American Hockey League.

For the 2012–13 season he played in Italy with HC Bolzano, scoring 28 goals and 20 assists for 48 points in 42 games played, and on September 7, 2013, it was announced that Flynn would be joining Ilves to play in the Finnish SM-liiga.

Flynn competed at the 2006 IIHF World U18 Championships where he won a gold medal as a member of Team USA.

== Career statistics ==
=== Regular season and playoffs ===
			Regular season					Playoffs
Season	Team	League	GP	G	A	Pts	PIM	GP	G	A	Pts	PIM
2004–05	US NTDP U17	USDP	64	17	17	34	50	—	—	—	—	—
2004–05	US NTDP Juniors	NAHL	41	11	8	19	31	9	2	4	6	7
2005–06	US NTDP U18	USDP	42	10	12	22	57	—	—	—	—	—
2005–06	US NTDP U18	NAHL	17	6	5	11	20	—	—	—	—	—
2006–07	University of Minnesota	WCHA	43	5	8	13	58	—	—	—	—	—
2007–08	University of Minnesota	WCHA	38	4	11	15	51	—	—	—	—	—
2008–09	University of Minnesota	WCHA	37	6	13	19	62	—	—	—	—	—
2009–10	University of Minnesota	WCHA	38	2	8	10	36	—	—	—	—	—
2009–10	Milwaukee Admirals	AHL	2	0	0	0	0	1	0	0	0	0
2010–11	Milwaukee Admirals	AHL	65	6	6	12	41	9	0	0	0	4
2011–12	Milwaukee Admirals	AHL	70	9	15	24	34	3	0	0	0	6
2012–13	HC Bolzano	ITA	42	28	20	48	73	6	2	2	4	10
2013–14	Ilves	Liiga	13	0	1	1	20	—	—	—	—	—
AHL totals			137	15	21	36	75	13	0	0	0	10

=== International ===
Year	Team	Event	Result	GP	G	A	Pts	PIM
2005	United States	U17	5th	5	2	3	5	4
2006	United States	WJC18	1st place, gold medalist(s)	6	2	1	3	4
2008	United States	WJC	4th	6	0	0	0	16
Junior totals				17	4	4	8	24

== Awards and honors ==
Award	Year
College
WCHA All-Academic Team	2009–10
