= Ben Maxwell =

Canadian ice hockey player (born 1988)

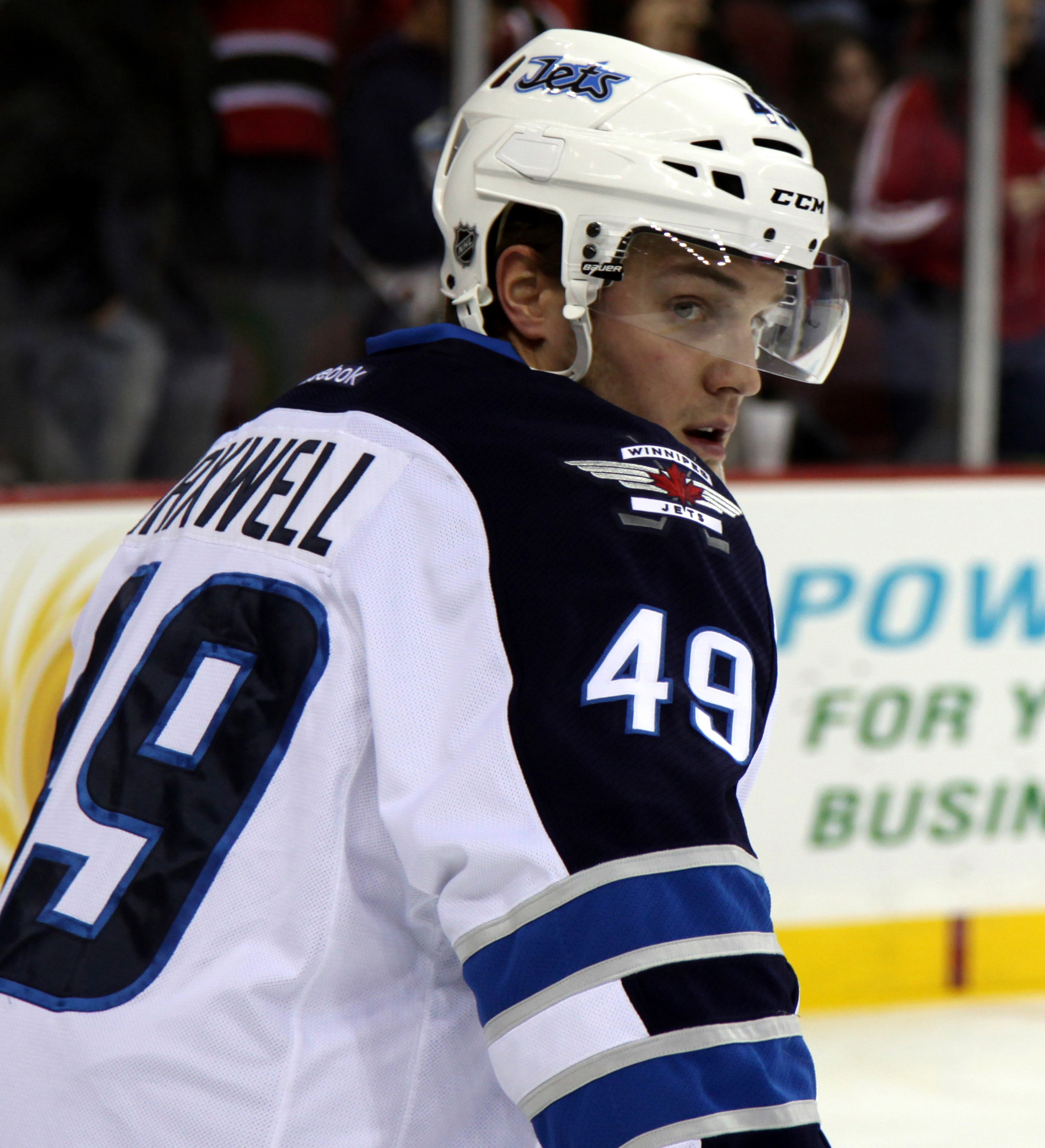
- Maxwell with the Winnipeg Jets in November 2011
- Born: March 30, 1988 (age 38) North Vancouver, British Columbia, Canada
- Height: 6 ft 0 in (183 cm)
- Weight: 177 lb (80 kg; 12 st 9 lb)
- Position: Centre
- Shot: Left
- Played for: Montreal Canadiens; Atlanta Thrashers; Winnipeg Jets; Anaheim Ducks; Oulun Kärpät; HC Yugra; HC Sochi; Spartak Moscow; SCL Tigers; Linköping HC
- NHL draft: 49th overall, 2006; Montreal Canadiens
- Playing career: 2008–2023

Benjamin Jeffrey Maxwell (born March 30, 1988) is a Canadian former professional ice hockey centre. He was selected in the second round, 49th overall, by the Montreal Canadiens in the 2006 NHL entry draft. Maxwell also played for the Anaheim Ducks, Atlanta Thrashers and Winnipeg Jets during his National Hockey League career.

== Playing career ==
As a youth, Maxwell played in the 2001 and 2002 Quebec International Pee-Wee Hockey Tournaments with a minor ice hockey team from North Vancouver.

Maxwell was selected 49th overall in the second round of the 2006 NHL entry draft by the Montreal Canadiens. While playing with the Kootenay Ice of the Western Hockey League, Maxwell signed a three-year entry-level contract with the Canadiens on March 1, 2008.

Maxwell was called up on December 12, 2008, from the American Hockey League (AHL)'s Hamilton Bulldogs to replace the injured Saku Koivu in the lineup. Maxwell made his NHL debut on December 13, 2008, against the Washington Capitals.

On February 24, Maxwell was traded along with a 4th round pick in the 2011 NHL entry draft, to the Atlanta Thrashers for Brent Sopel and Nigel Dawes. He scored his first NHL goal on March 27, 2011, against Craig Anderson of the Ottawa Senators. He was also named first star of that game. On July 18, 2011, Maxwell signed a one-year $715,000 contract with the Winnipeg Jets. On November 10, 2011, Maxwell was claimed off waivers by the Anaheim Ducks. When the Ducks placed Maxwell on waivers on December 6, he was re-claimed by the Jets.

On July 6, 2012, Maxwell re-signed to a one-year contract extension with the Jets. In the 2012–13 season, Maxwell was assigned directly to AHL affiliate, the St. John's IceCaps. He remained there for the duration of the year, scoring 11 goals and 40 points in 74 games. On August 11, 2013, Maxwell with the intention to regain NHL interest, Maxwell signed a one-year contract abroad in the Finnish SM-liiga with Kärpät Oulu where he won the Finnish championship in April, 2014.

On May 29, 2014, Maxwell moved to the Kontinental Hockey League's HC Yugra based in Khanty-Mansiysk on a one-year deal. On February 12, 2015, Maxwell returned to Finland when signed a deal with Oulun Kärpät. He moved back to KHL with HC Sochi for the following two seasons, prior signing a contract with HC Spartak Moscow for 2017–18.

After five seasons in the KHL, Maxwell left Russia to sign a one-year contract as a free agent with Swiss club, SCL Tigers of the National League (NL), on July 12, 2019.

Maxwell then spent two years with Swedish club, Linköping HC of the SHL, before leaving at the conclusion of his contract following the 2022–23 season on March 14, 2023.

== Career statistics ==
=== Regular season and playoffs ===
			Regular season					Playoffs
Season	Team	League	GP	G	A	Pts	PIM	GP	G	A	Pts	PIM
2003–04	North Delta Flyers	PIJHL	40	17	28	45	46	5	3	6	9	0
2003–04	Surrey Eagles	BCHL	2	0	0	0	0	—	—	—	—	—
2003–04	Kootenay Ice	WHL	3	0	1	1	2	1	0	0	0	0
2004–05	Kootenay Ice	WHL	68	8	10	18	37	16	0	1	1	6
2005–06	Kootenay Ice	WHL	69	28	32	60	52	6	3	5	8	0
2006–07	Kootenay Ice	WHL	39	19	34	53	42	7	1	4	5	21
2007–08	Kootenay Ice	WHL	31	9	18	27	26	10	6	3	9	14
2008–09	Hamilton Bulldogs	AHL	73	22	36	58	58	6	3	1	4	4
2008–09	Montreal Canadiens	NHL	7	0	0	0	2	—	—	—	—	—
2009–10	Hamilton Bulldogs	AHL	57	16	28	44	22	1	0	0	0	0
2009–10	Montreal Canadiens	NHL	13	0	0	0	6	1	0	0	0	0
2010–11	Hamilton Bulldogs	AHL	47	11	29	40	32	—	—	—	—	—
2010–11	Chicago Wolves	AHL	2	0	1	1	0	—	—	—	—	—
2010–11	Atlanta Thrashers	NHL	12	1	1	2	9	—	—	—	—	—
2011–12	Winnipeg Jets	NHL	9	1	4	5	0	—	—	—	—	—
2011–12	Anaheim Ducks	NHL	6	0	1	1	2	—	—	—	—	—
2011–12	St. John's IceCaps	AHL	43	8	17	25	35	15	3	4	7	4
2012–13	St. John's IceCaps	AHL	74	11	29	40	52	—	—	—	—	—
2013–14	Kärpät	Liiga	49	16	26	42	56	16	3	4	7	6
2014–15	HC Yugra	KHL	46	14	13	27	48	—	—	—	—	—
2014–15	Kärpät	Liiga	12	3	3	6	8	19	7	5	12	8
2015–16	HC Sochi	KHL	52	14	18	32	57	3	0	0	0	4
2016–17	HC Sochi	KHL	48	8	7	15	34	—	—	—	—	—
2017–18	Spartak Moscow	KHL	39	12	16	28	16	4	0	0	0	2
2018–19	Spartak Moscow	KHL	59	11	12	23	20	—	—	—	—	—
2019–20	SCL Tigers	NL	48	16	17	33	34	—	—	—	—	—
2020–21	SCL Tigers	NL	50	10	17	27	14	—	—	—	—	—
2021–22	Linköping HC	SHL	38	6	6	12	8	—	—	—	—	—
2022–23	Linköping HC	SHL	43	0	7	7	20	—	—	—	—	—
AHL totals			296	68	140	208	199	22	6	5	11	8
NHL totals			47	2	6	8	19	1	0	0	0	0
KHL totals			244	59	66	125	175	7	0	0	0	6

=== International ===
Year	Team	Event	Result	GP	G	A	Pts	PIM
2005	Canada Pacific	U17	2nd place, silver medalist(s)	6	2	7	9	4
2005	Canada	U18	1st place, gold medalist(s)	5	0	4	4	6
2006	Canada	WJC18	4th	7	2	5	7	10
Junior totals				18	4	16	20	20
