= Robert Nyholm =

Finnish ice hockey player

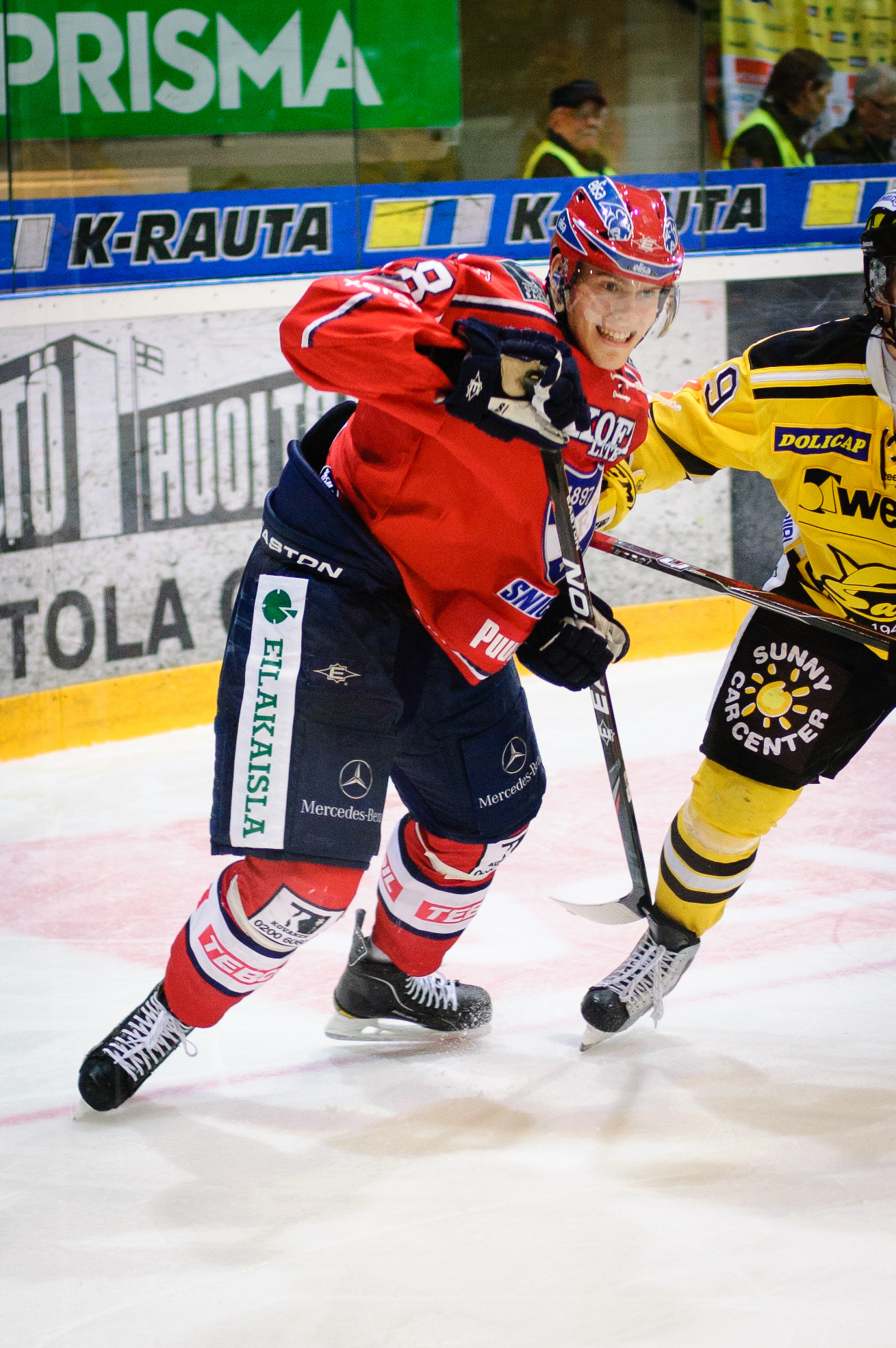
- Born: March 7, 1988 (age 38) Jakobstad, Finland
- Height: 6 ft 1 in (185 cm)
- Weight: 196 lb (89 kg; 14 st 0 lb)
- Position: Right wing
- Shot: Left
- Played for: HIFK; Espoo Blues
- NHL draft: 129th overall, 2006; Columbus Blue Jackets
- Playing career: 2008–2015

Robert Nyholm (born March 7, 1988) is a Finnish former professional ice hockey forward who played in the Finnish Liiga for HIFK and the Espoo Blues. He was selected by the Columbus Blue Jackets in the 5th round (129th overall) of the 2006 NHL entry draft.

== Career statistics ==
=== Regular season and playoffs ===
			Regular season					Playoffs
Season	Team	League	GP	G	A	Pts	PIM	GP	G	A	Pts	PIM
2004–05	HIFK	FIN U18	1	1	0	1	2	3	0	2	2	6
2004–05	HIFK	FIN U20	33	6	5	11	35	—	—	—	—	—
2005–06	HIFK	FIN U18	2	2	3	5	4	7	4	3	7	4
2005–06	HIFK	FIN U20	39	9	11	20	24	—	—	—	—	—
2006–07	Kingston Frontenacs	OHL	66	13	21	34	29	5	0	3	3	2
2007–08	Kingston Frontenacs	OHL	27	1	4	5	6	—	—	—	—	—
2008–09	HIFK	FIN U20	6	2	2	4	2	—	—	—	—	—
2008–09	HIFK	SM-liiga	17	0	0	0	2	—	—	—	—	—
2008–09	Kiekko–Vantaa	Mestis	25	7	4	11	10	—	—	—	—	—
2009–10	HIFK	SM-liiga	28	2	6	8	14	—	—	—	—	—
2009–10	Kiekko–Vantaa	Mestis	5	2	2	4	0	—	—	—	—	—
2010–11	HIFK	FIN U20	2	0	1	1	0	—	—	—	—	—
2010–11	HIFK	SM-liiga	23	5	1	6	10	15	4	1	5	6
2010–11	Kiekko–Vantaa	Mestis	4	1	2	3	0	—	—	—	—	—
2011–12	HIFK	SM-liiga	42	4	3	7	20	3	0	0	0	2
2011–12	Kiekko–Vantaa	Mestis	4	1	2	3	0	—	—	—	—	—
2012–13	HIFK	SM-liiga	1	0	0	0	0	—	—	—	—	—
2012–13	HCK	Mestis	27	11	2	13	10	—	—	—	—	—
2012–13	Blues	SM-liiga	9	0	1	1	2	—	—	—	—	—
2013–14	Sport	Mestis	49	7	11	18	53	7	0	1	1	2
2014–15	IFL Lepplax	FIN.5	6	11	8	19	4	—	—	—	—	—
SM-liiga totals			120	11	11	22	48	18	4	1	5	8
Mestis totals			120	34	25	59	79	7	0	1	1	2

=== International ===
Year	Team	Event	Result	GP	G	A	Pts	PIM
2005	Finland	WJC18	7th	4	0	0	0	0
2005	Finland	U18	3rd place, bronze medalist(s)	5	1	0	1	4
2006	Finland	WJC18	2nd place, silver medalist(s)	5	2	1	3	2
Junior totals				14	3	1	4	6
