= Anton Glovatsky =

Russian ice hockey player (born 1988)

- Born: August 6, 1988 (age 36); Magnitogorsk, USSR
- Height: 5 ft 11 in (180 cm)
- Weight: 181 lb (82 kg; 12 st 13 lb)
- Position: Right wing
- Shoots: Left
- VHL team Former teams: Buran Voronezh; Metallurg Magnitogorsk; Atlant Moscow Oblast; Traktor Chelyabinsk
- Playing career: 2005–present

Anton Glovatsky (born August 6, 1988) is a Russian professional ice hockey winger currently playing for Buran Voronezh in the VHL. He has previously played in the Kontinental Hockey League (KHL) with Metallurg Magnitogorsk, Atlant Moscow Oblast and Traktor Chelyabinsk.
