= Joonas Jalvanti =

Finnish ice hockey player

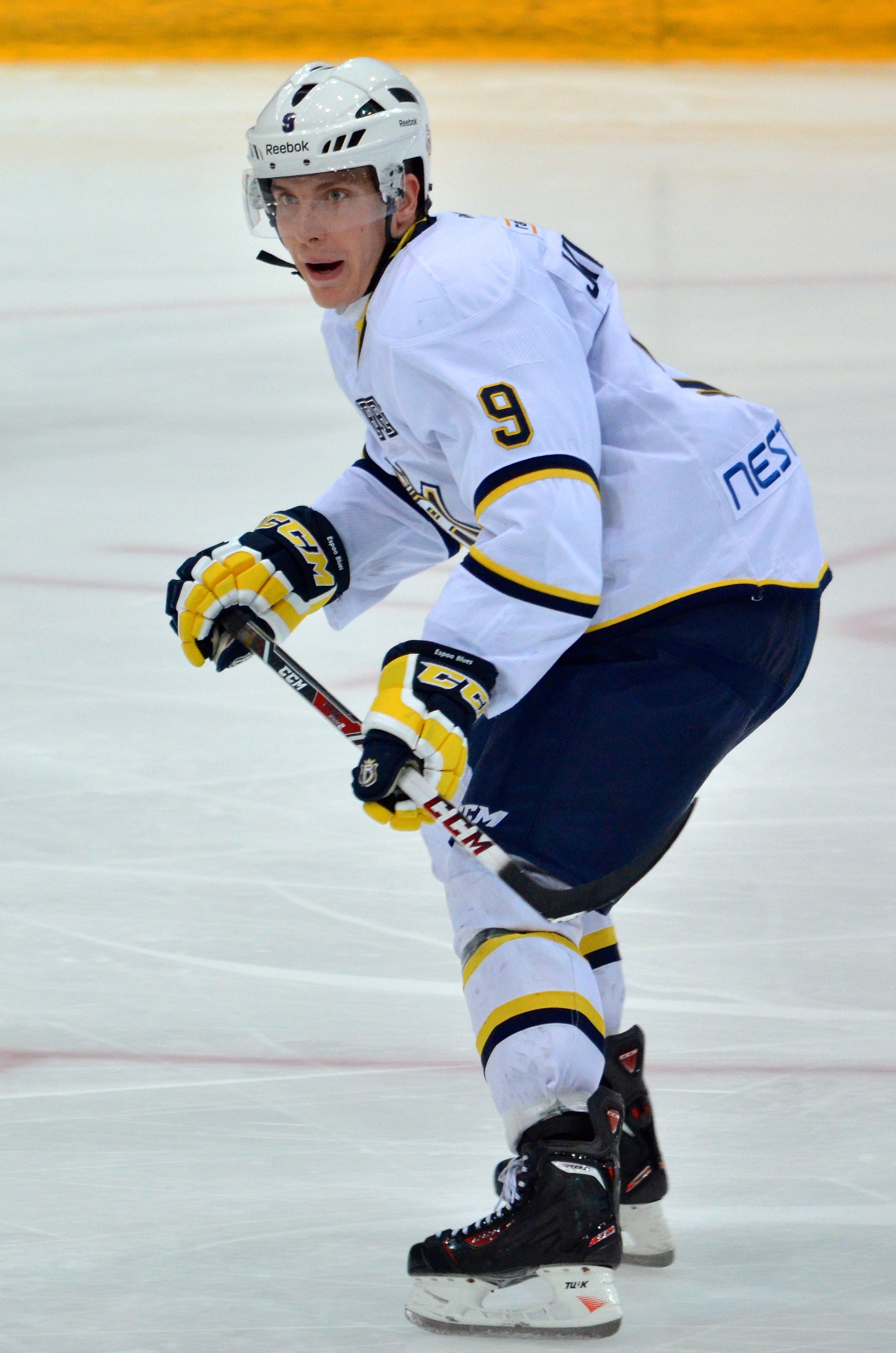
- Born: 9 September 1988 (age 37) Lahti, Finland
- Height: 6 ft 0 in (183 cm)
- Weight: 196 lb (89 kg; 14 st 0 lb)
- Position: Defence
- Shot: Left
- Played for: Lahti Pelicans; Peliitat Heinola; Espoo Blues; Örebro HK; Jokerit; Luleå HF
- Playing career: 2006–2022

Joonas Jalvanti (born 9 September 1988) is a Finnish former professional ice hockey defenceman. He most recently played for Lahti Pelicans in the Liiga.

Jalvanti formerly played two seasons in the SHL after joining Örebro HK from Finnish club, Espoo Blues of the Liiga on 10 April 2014.

In 2023, Jalvanti announced his retirement from professional hockey, citing lingering effects from multiple brain injuries.

== Career statistics ==
			Regular season					Playoffs
Season	Team	League	GP	G	A	Pts	PIM	GP	G	A	Pts	PIM
2003–04	Kiekkoreipas U16	U16 SM-sarja	18	6	4	10	31	—	—	—	—	—
2003–04	Kiekkoreipas U18	U18 SM-sarja	3	0	1	1	2	—	—	—	—	—
2004–05	Kiekkoreipas U18	U18 SM-sarja	30	2	10	12	8	3	0	2	2	0
2005–06	Kiekkoreipas U18	U18 SM-sarja	4	2	1	3	0	—	—	—	—	—
2005–06	Lahti Pelicans U20	U20 SM-liiga	35	2	7	9	10	—	—	—	—	—
2006–07	Lahti Pelicans U20	U20 SM-liiga	32	7	21	28	10	15	1	5	6	8
2006–07	Lahti Pelicans	SM-liiga	7	0	1	1	2	—	—	—	—	—
2006–07	Suomi U20	Mestis	9	0	1	1	2	—	—	—	—	—
2007–08	Lahti Pelicans U20	U20 SM-liiga	11	0	4	4	12	—	—	—	—	—
2007–08	Lahti Pelicans	SM-liiga	45	1	3	4	10	6	0	1	1	0
2007–08	Suomi U20	Mestis	2	0	0	0	0	—	—	—	—	—
2008–09	Lahti Pelicans	SM-liiga	58	3	12	15	24	10	0	1	1	2
2009–10	Lahti Pelicans	SM-liiga	58	6	6	12	34	—	—	—	—	—
2010–11	Lahti Pelicans	SM-liiga	54	2	5	7	24	—	—	—	—	—
2010–11	HeKi	Mestis	2	0	0	0	2	—	—	—	—	—
2011–12	Lahti Pelicans	SM-liiga	60	2	10	12	30	17	0	4	4	8
2012–13	Espoo Blues	SM-liiga	60	5	18	23	22	—	—	—	—	—
2013–14	Espoo Blues	Liiga	56	2	10	12	40	7	0	1	1	0
2014–15	Örebro HK	SHL	52	2	4	6	20	6	0	1	1	0
2015–16	Örebro HK	SHL	49	0	8	8	6	2	0	0	0	0
2016–17	Jokerit	KHL	37	0	6	6	8	1	0	0	0	0
2017–18	Jokerit	KHL	2	0	0	0	0	—	—	—	—	—
2017–18	Luleå HF	SHL	44	1	8	9	16	3	0	0	0	0
2018–19	Luleå HF	SHL	51	0	6	6	16	7	0	0	0	0
2019–20	Luleå HF	SHL	44	1	4	5	4	—	—	—	—	—
2020–21	Lahti Pelicans	Liiga	37	4	6	10	18	5	0	2	2	2
2021–22	Lahti Pelicans	Liiga	10	2	2	4	8	—	—	—	—	—
KHL totals			39	0	6	6	8	1	0	0	0	0
SHL totals			240	4	30	34	62	18	0	1	1	0
SM-liiga totals			445	27	73	100	212	47	0	9	9	16
