= Milan Jurík =

Slovak ice hockey player

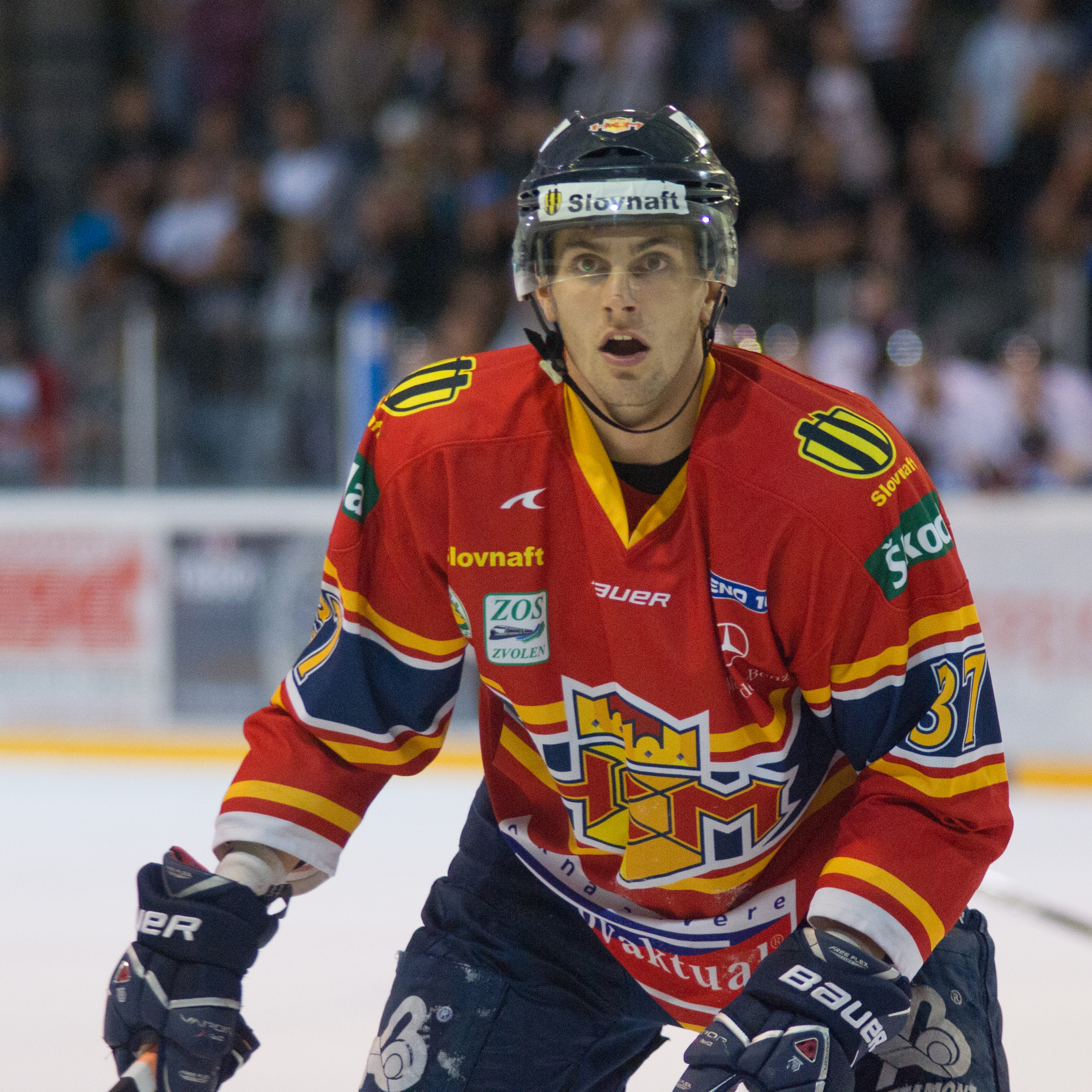
- Born: February 28, 1988 (age 37); Zvolen, Czechoslovakia
- Height: 6 ft 3 in (191 cm)
- Weight: 201 lb (91 kg; 14 st 5 lb)
- Position: Forward
- Shoots: Left
- Ligue Magnus team Former teams: Scorpions de Mulhouse; HKm Zvolen
- Playing career: 2004–present

Milan Jurík (born February 28, 1988) is a Slovak professional ice hockey player who is currently playing for Scorpions de Mulhouse in the Ligue Magnus.
