= Jani Savolainen =

Finnish ice hockey right winger

- Born: October 5, 1988 (age 37) Kuopio, Finland
- Height: 5 ft 11 in (180 cm)
- Weight: 192 lb (87 kg; 13 st 10 lb)
- Position: Right wing
- Shot: Right
- Played for: KalPa; LHC Les Lions
- Playing career: 2007–2016

Jani Savolainen (born October 5, 1988) is a Finnish former professional ice hockey right winger.

Savolainen played five games for KalPa during the 2007–08 SM-liiga season, scoring one assist. He would then play in Mestis for Jokipojat, Hokki and Mikkelin Jukurit. He also played in the Ligue Magnus for LHC Les Lions and the Hockeyettan for Piteå HC.
