= James McGinn =

Scottish footballer

Personal information
- Full name: James McGinn
- Date of birth: 27 June 1868
- Place of birth: Renfrew, Scotland
- Date of death: 1932 (aged 63–64)
- Position: Inside forward

Senior career*
Years	Team	Apps	(Gls)
1891–1892	Baillieston		
1892–1894	Mossend Celtic		
1893–1894	Celtic	2	(0)
1894	Airdrieonians		
1894–1895	Bolton Wanderers	15	(3)
1895	Airdrieonians		
Total		17	(3)
- * Club domestic league appearances and goals

James McGinn (27 June 1868 – 1932) was a Scottish footballer who played in the Football League for Bolton Wanderers.
