= David Květoň =

Czech ice hockey player

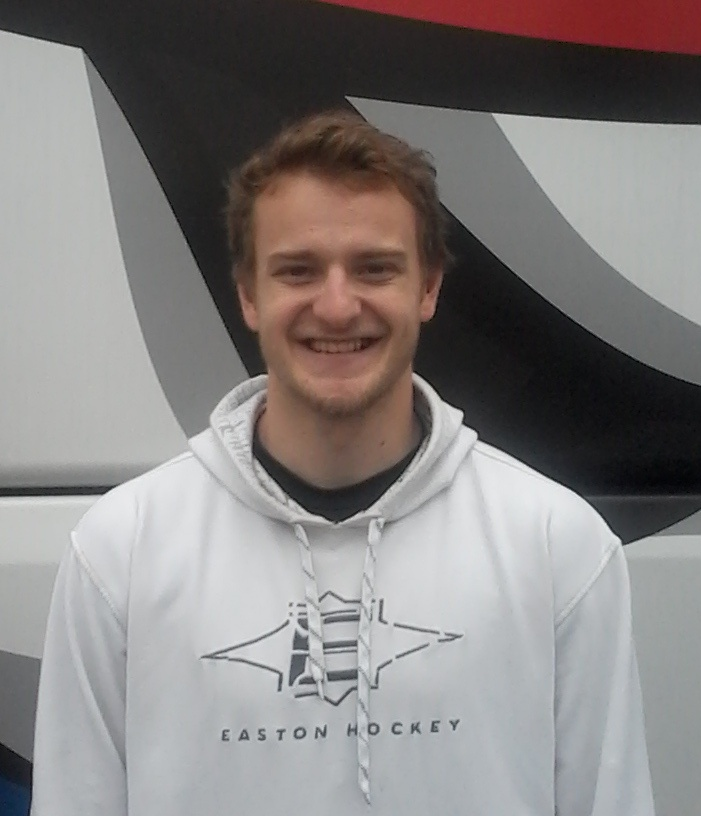
- Born: 3 January 1988 (age 38) Nový Jičín, Czechoslovakia
- Height: 5 ft 11 in (180 cm)
- Weight: 180 lb (82 kg; 12 st 12 lb)
- Position: Forward
- Shot: Left
- Played for: Vsetínská hokejová HC Oceláři Třinec; Oulun Kärpät; BK Mladá Boleslav; Piráti Chomutov; HC Vítkovice Ridera; HC Košice
- NHL draft: 104th overall, 2006; New York Rangers
- Playing career: 2003–2024

David Květoň (born 3 January 1988) is a former Czech professional ice hockey forward.

He was selected by the New York Rangers in the 4th round (104 overall) of the 2006 NHL entry draft but did not play.

== Career statistics ==
=== Regular season and playoffs ===
			Regular season					Playoffs
Season	Team	League	GP	G	A	Pts	PIM	GP	G	A	Pts	PIM
2001–02	HC Nový Jičín	CZE.2 U18	14	9	9	18	4	—	—	—	—	—
2003–04	Vsetínská hokejová	CZE U18	14	9	11	20	35	—	—	—	—	—
2003–04	Vsetínská hokejová	CZE U20	41	12	11	23	14	5	2	3	5	2
2003–04	Vsetínská hokejová	ELH	1	0	0	0	0	—	—	—	—	—
2003–04	HC Nový Jičín	CZE.3	1	0	1	1	0	—	—	—	—	—
2004–05	Vsetínská hokejová	CZE U18	1	1	0	1	0	—	—	—	—	—
2004–05	Vsetínská hokejová	CZE U20	35	19	27	46	66	8	6	5	11	4
2004–05	Vsetínská hokejová	ELH	6	1	0	1	0	—	—	—	—	—
2004–05	HC Nový Jičín	CZE.3	7	0	1	1	6	—	—	—	—	—
2005–06	Vsetínská hokejová	CZE U20	1	1	1	2	0	1	0	1	1	0
2005–06	Vsetínská hokejová	ELH	45	6	4	10	28	—	—	—	—	—
2005–06	HC Sareza Ostrava	CZE.2	7	2	1	3	2	—	—	—	—	—
2005–06	HC Nový Jičín	CZE.3	—	—	—	—	—	5	5	0	5	18
2006–07	Gatineau Olympiques	QMJHL	31	5	27	32	17	5	0	0	0	4
2006–07	Vsetínská hokejová	ELH	19	2	0	2	8	—	—	—	—	—
2007–08	HC Oceláři Třinec	ELH	28	10	5	15	10	—	—	—	—	—
2008–09	HC Oceláři Třinec	ELH	46	22	22	44	20	5	3	2	5	16
2008–09	KLH Chomutov	CZE.2	—	—	—	—	—	5	2	2	4	0
2009–10	HC Oceláři Třinec	ELH	52	18	17	35	59	5	1	1	2	24
2010–11	HC Oceláři Třinec	ELH	52	14	18	32	26	18	7	12	19	8
2011–12	HC Oceláři Třinec	ELH	52	14	15	29	40	5	0	1	1	4
2012–13	HC Oceláři Třinec	ELH	52	17	21	38	20	13	3	1	4	4
2013–14	Oulun Kärpät	Liiga	5	0	1	1	0	—	—	—	—	—
2013–14	HC Oceláři Třinec	ELH	39	8	11	19	16	11	1	2	3	6
2014–15	BK Mladá Boleslav	ELH	4	0	0	0	0	—	—	—	—	—
2014–15	Piráti Chomutov	CZE.2	35	8	17	25	20	20	5	7	12	16
2015–16	Piráti Chomutov	ELH	39	8	4	12	22	8	1	1	2	2
2016–17	HC Vítkovice Ridera	ELH	52	14	10	24	59	5	0	1	1	2
2017–18	HC Vítkovice Ridera	ELH	43	16	9	25	58	4	0	0	0	2
2018–19	HC Vítkovice Ridera	ELH	50	8	11	19	28	8	2	2	4	2
2019–20	HC Oceláři Třinec	ELH	1	0	0	0	0	—	—	—	—	—
2019–20	HC Frýdek–Místek	CZE.2	16	4	10	14	10	—	—	—	—	—
2019–20	HC Košice	Slovak	22	4	13	17	10	—	—	—	—	—
2021–22	HK Nový Jičín	CZE.3	4	1	3	4	2	12	2	5	7	31
2022–23	HK Nový Jičín	CZE.3	31	16	21	37	10	3	1	1	2	2
2023–24	HK Nový Jičín	CZE.3	34	14	23	37	24	4	2	5	7	2
ELH totals			581	158	147	305	384	82	18	23	41	70
Liiga totals			5	0	1	1	0	—	—	—	—	—
Slovak totals			22	4	13	17	10	—	—	—	—	—

=== International ===
Year	Team	Event	GP	G	A	Pts	PIM
2005	Czech Republic	WJC18	7	4	2	6	4
2006	Czech Republic	WJC18	7	2	5	7	2
2006	Czech Republic	U18	5	0	1	1	0
2007	Czech Republic	WJC	6	0	0	0	0
2008	Czech Republic	WJC	1	0	0	0	2
Junior totals			21	6	7	13	8
