= Thomas Larsson (ice hockey) =

Swedish ice hockey player

- Born: January 16, 1988 (age 38) Skellefteå, Sweden
- Height: 5 ft 11 in (180 cm)
- Weight: 185 lb (84 kg; 13 st 3 lb)
- Position: Center
- Shoots: Left
- Played for: Skellefteå AIK; Malmö Redhawks; Diables Rouges de Briançon
- Playing career: 2006–present

Thomas Larsson (born January 16, 1988, in Skellefteå) is a Swedish ice hockey player. Thomas Larsson played in two leagues over the course of his career. He is currently playing with the Malmö Redhawks in the Swedish HockeyAllsvenskan. He has formerly played for Skellefteå AIK.

== Career statistics ==
			Regular season					Playoffs
Season	Team	League	GP	G	A	Pts	PIM	GP	G	A	Pts	PIM
2004–05	Skellefteå AIK J18	J18 Allsvenskan	2	1	0	1	14	—	—	—	—	—
2004–05	Skellefteå AIK J20	J20 SuperElit	18	2	4	6	80	—	—	—	—	—
2004–05	Skellefteå AIK	Allsvenskan	—	—	—	—	—	1	1	0	1	2
2005–06	Skellefteå AIK J20	J20 SuperElit	37	18	11	29	223	—	—	—	—	—
2005–06	Skellefteå AIK	HockeyAllsvenskan	10	0	0	0	12	—	—	—	—	—
2006–07	Skellefteå AIK J20	J20 SuperElit	4	2	2	4	49	—	—	—	—	—
2006–07	Skellefteå AIK	Elitserien	46	5	5	10	12	—	—	—	—	—
2006–07	IF Sundsvall Hockey	HockeyAllsvenskan	5	0	0	0	6	—	—	—	—	—
2007–08	Skellefteå AIK J20	J20 SuperElit	1	1	1	2	0	—	—	—	—	—
2007–08	Skellefteå AIK	Elitserien	34	1	6	7	42	5	1	0	1	28
2007–08	Rögle BK	HockeyAllsvenskan	2	0	1	1	12	—	—	—	—	—
2007–08	IF Sundsvall Hockey	HockeyAllsvenskan	9	1	1	2	56	—	—	—	—	—
2008–09	Skellefteå AIK	Elitserien	38	0	4	4	37	—	—	—	—	—
2008–09	Malmö Redhawks	HockeyAllsvenskan	12	0	3	3	18	—	—	—	—	—
2009–10	Malmö Redhawks	HockeyAllsvenskan	50	5	8	13	95	4	1	0	1	29
2010–11	Malmö Redhawks	HockeyAllsvenskan	46	2	9	11	126	—	—	—	—	—
2011–12	Tingsryds AIF	HockeyAllsvenskan	47	7	13	20	42	—	—	—	—	—
2012–13	Tingsryds AIF	HockeyAllsvenskan	43	7	6	13	88	4	1	0	1	2
2013–14	Mora IK	HockeyAllsvenskan	20	3	5	8	42	2	1	0	1	0
2014–15	Mora IK	HockeyAllsvenskan	14	0	0	0	14	—	—	—	—	—
2014–15	Asplöven HC	HockeyAllsvenskan	10	0	0	0	2	—	—	—	—	—
2015–16	Diables Rouges de Briançon	Ligue Magnus	2	0	1	1	2	—	—	—	—	—
Elitserien totals			118	6	15	21	91	5	1	0	1	28
Ligue Magnus totals			2	0	1	1	2	—	—	—	—	—
HockeyAllsvenskan totals			268	25	46	71	513	10	3	0	3	31
