= Milan Bališ =

Slovak ice hockey player

- Slovak Extraliga team: HC Slovan Bratislava
- Playing career: 2006–present

Milan Bališ is a Slovak professional ice hockey player who played with HC Slovan Bratislava in the Slovak Extraliga.
