= Michael Endrass =

German professional ice hockey player

- Born: September 18, 1988 (age 36); Füssen, West Germany
- Height: 5 ft 8 in (173 cm)
- Weight: 163 lb (74 kg; 11 st 9 lb)
- Position: Left wing
- Shoots: Left
- DEL team Former teams: Straubing Tigers; Krefeld Pinguine
- NHL draft: Undrafted
- Playing career: 2008–present

Michael Endrass (born September 18, 1988) is a German professional ice hockey player. He played for the Straubing Tigers in the Deutsche Eishockey Liga (DEL). He joined the Tigers from fellow DEL club, the Krefeld Pinguine.
