= 2005 World U-17 Hockey Challenge =

The 2005 World U-17 Hockey Challenge was an ice hockey tournament held in Lethbridge, Alberta, Canada between December 29, 2004 and January 4, 2005. The venues used for the tournament were the ENMAX Centre and the Nicholas Sheran Arena. Team Western defeated Pacific 3-1 in the final to claim the gold medal, while Canada Atlantic defeated Canada Ontario to capture the bronze medal.

== Challenge results ==
=== Preliminary round ===
==== Group A ====
| Team | Pld | W | L | D | GF | GA | GD | Pts |
|---|---|---|---|---|---|---|---|---|
| Canada West | 4 | 3 | 1 | 0 | 17 | 9 | +8 | 6 |
| Canada Ontario | 4 | 3 | 1 | 0 | 24 | 10 | +14 | 6 |
| United States | 4 | 2 | 1 | 1 | 15 | 12 | +3 | 5 |
| Slovakia | 4 | 1 | 2 | 1 | 7 | 14 | −7 | 3 |
| Germany | 4 | 0 | 4 | 0 | 4 | 22 | −18 | 0 |

==== Group B ====
| Team | Pld | W | L | D | GF | GA | GD | Pts |
|---|---|---|---|---|---|---|---|---|
| Canada Pacific | 4 | 2 | 0 | 2 | 17 | 13 | +4 | 6 |
| Canada Atlantic | 4 | 3 | 1 | 0 | 19 | 9 | +10 | 6 |
| Finland | 4 | 2 | 1 | 1 | 17 | 16 | +1 | 5 |
| Czech Republic | 4 | 1 | 2 | 1 | 12 | 18 | −6 | 3 |
| Canada Quebec | 4 | 0 | 4 | 0 | 12 | 21 | −9 | 0 |

=== Final round ===
Semi finals
A1 | Canada West | 7
B2 | Canada Atlantic | 3
B1 | Canada Pacific | 9
A2 | Canada Ontario | 1

Final
SF1 | Canada West | 3
SF2 | Canada Pacific | 1

=== Final standings ===
| | Team |
|---|---|
| 1 | Canada West |
| 2 | Canada Pacific |
| 3 | Canada Atlantic |
| 4 | Canada Ontario |
| 5 | United States |
| 6 | Finland |
| 7 | Czech Republic |
| 8 | Slovakia |
| 9 | Canada Quebec |
| 10 | Germany |

== Scoring leaders ==
| Player | Country | GP | G | A | Pts | PIM |
|---|---|---|---|---|---|---|
| Jonathan Toews | Canada West | 6 | 8 | 4 | 12 | 2 |
| Kyle Bortis | Canada West | 6 | 5 | 6 | 11 | 0 |
| Ryan McDonough | Canada Ontario | 6 | 5 | 6 | 11 | 2 |
| Brad Marchand | Canada Atlantic | 6 | 5 | 6 | 11 | 10 |
| Ryan White | Canada West | 6 | 2 | 9 | 11 | 6 |
| James Sheppard | Canada Atlantic | 6 | 6 | 2 | 10 | 6 |
| Tyler Swystun | Canada Pacific | 6 | 6 | 3 | 9 | 4 |
| Jiří Tlustý | Czech Republic | 5 | 5 | 4 | 9 | 4 |
| Ben Maxwell | Canada Pacific | 6 | 2 | 7 | 9 | 4 |
| Blake Gallagher | Canada Atlantic | 6 | 7 | 1 | 8 | 2 |
| Mitch Fadden | Canada Pacific | 6 | 6 | 2 | 8 | 4 |
| Patrick Kane | United States | 6 | 1 | 7 | 8 | 0 |

== Goaltending leaders ==
(Minimum 60 minutes played)

| Player | Country | MINS | GA | Sv% | GAA | SO |
|---|---|---|---|---|---|---|
| Joseph Palmer | United States | 180:00 | 5 | .923 | 1.67 | 0 |
| Leland Irving | Canada Pacific | 305:00 | 9 | .942 | 1.77 | 0 |
| Ryan Nieszner | Canada West | 333:00 | 12 | .916 | 2.16 | 0 |
| Roger Kennedy | Canada Atlantic | 360:00 | 9 | .892 | 3.33 | 1 |
| Jason Guy | Canada Ontario | 195:00 | 11 | .906 | 3.69 | 1 |
