= 2008 World Junior Ice Hockey Championships rosters =

== Top Division ==
=== Group A ===
==== Canada ====
Coach - Craig Hartsburg

Pos.	No.	Player	Team	NHL rights
GK	1	Jonathan Bernier	(United States) Lewiston Maineiacs
GK	30	Steve Mason	(Canada) London Knights/Kitchener Rangers
D	27	Karl Alzner	(Canada) Calgary Hitmen
D	8	Drew Doughty	(Canada) Guelph Storm	Draft-Eligible 2008
D	2	Josh Godfrey	(Canada) Sault Ste. Marie Greyhounds
D	4	Thomas Hickey	(United States) Seattle Thunderbirds	Los Angeles Kings
D	3	Logan Pyett	(Canada) Regina Pats	Detroit Red Wings
D	23	P. K. Subban	(Canada) Belleville Bulls	Montreal Canadiens
D	15	Luke Schenn	(Canada) Kelowna Rockets	Draft-Eligible 2008
F	11	Zach Boychuk	(Canada) Lethbridge Hurricanes
F	18	Colton Gillies	(Canada) Saskatoon Blades	Minnesota Wild
F	28	Claude Giroux	(Canada) Gatineau Olympiques	Philadelphia Flyers
F	32	Matthew Halischuk	(Canada) Kitchener Rangers	New Jersey Devils
F	21	Riley Holzapfel	(Canada) Moose Jaw Warriors	Atlanta Thrashers
F	7	Stefan Legein	(Canada) Niagara IceDogs	Columbus Blue Jackets
F	17	Brad Marchand	(Canada) Halifax Mooseheads	Boston Bruins
F	22	Shawn Matthias	(Canada) Belleville Bulls	Detroit Red Wings
F	34	Wayne Simmonds	(Canada) Sault Ste. Marie Greyhounds	Los Angeles Kings
F	10	Steven Stamkos	(Canada) Sarnia Sting	Draft-Eligible 2008
F	12	Brandon Sutter	(Canada) Red Deer Rebels	Carolina Hurricanes
F	20	John Tavares	(Canada) Oshawa Generals	Draft-Eligible 2009
F	19	Kyle Turris	(United States) University of Wisconsin	Phoenix Coyotes

==== Czech Republic ====
Pos.	No.	Player	Team	NHL rights
GK	30	Jakub Kovář	(Canada) Oshawa Generals
GK	29	Michal Neuvirth	(Canada) Windsor Spitfires	Washington Capitals
D	15	Antonín Bořuta	(Czech Republic) HC Zlín
D	9	Michal Jordán	(United States) Plymouth Whalers
D	23	Tomáš Kundrátek	(Czech Republic) HC Oceláři Třinec
D	6	Martin Parýzek	(Canada) Ottawa 67s
D	5	Jan Piskáček	(Canada) Cape Breton Screaming Eagles
D	4	Patrik Prokop	(Czech Republic) HC Vítkovice
D	3	Jiří Suchý	(Czech Republic) HC Sareza Ostrava
F	11	Daniel Bártek	(Canada) Brandon Wheat Kings
F	14	Michael Frolík	(Canada) Rimouski Océanic	Florida Panthers
F	21	Zbyněk Hampl	(Czech Republic) HC Oceláři Třinec
F	13	Pavel Kuběna	(Czech Republic) HC Energie Karlovy Vary
F	17	David Květoň	(Czech Republic) HC Oceláři Třinec
F	12	Martin Látal	(Canada) P.E.I. Rocket
F	18	Radek Meidl	(Czech Republic) HC Olomouc
F	24	Jiří Ondráček	(Czech Republic) HC Zlín
F	25	Jan Semorád	(Czech Republic) HC Moeller Pardubice
F	16	Jakub Sklenář	(Czech Republic) HC Slavia Praha
F	27	Petr Strapáč	(Czech Republic) HC Vítkovice
F	28	Roman Szturc	(Czech Republic) HC Vítkovice
F	20	Jakub Voráček	(Canada) Halifax Mooseheads	Columbus Blue Jackets

==== Denmark ====
Pos.	No.	Player	Team	NHL rights
GK	1	Frederik Andersen	(Denmark) Herning Blue Fox
GK	2	Christian Møller	(Denmark) Herlev Hornets
D	6	Emil Bigler	(Denmark) Rødovre Mighty Bulls
D	7	Simon Grønvaldt	(Denmark) Rødovre Mighty Bulls
D	24	John Jensen	(Denmark) Rødovre Mighty Bulls
D	3	Philip Larsen	(Sweden) Frölunda HC	Draft-Eligible 2008
D	4	Oliver Lauridsen	(Sweden) Linköpings HC
D	5	Christoffer Rasmussen	(Denmark) Nordsjælland Cobras
D	17	Mathias Pedersen	(Denmark) Herning Blue Fox
F	8	Mikkel Bødker	(Canada) Kitchener Rangers	Draft Eligible 2008
F	16	Lars Eller	(Sweden) Borås HC	St. Louis Blues
F	22	Nichlas Hardt	(Denmark) Herlev Hornets
F	12	Jeppe Henriksen	(Denmark) Herlev Hornets
F	20	Sune Hjulmand	(Denmark) Esbjerg IK
F	10	Lasse Holgaard	(Denmark) Esbjerg IK
F	15	Alexander Jensen	(Sweden) Linköpings HC
F	13	Nicholas Jensen	(Sweden) Linköpings HC
F	14	Lasse Lassen	(Denmark) Herning Blue Fox
F	25	Kevin Leder	(Denmark) Herlev Hornets
F	11	Mads Lund	(Denmark) SønderjyskE Vojens
F	18	Morten Poulsen	(Denmark) Herning Blue Fox
F	28	Sebastian Svendsen	(Sweden) Frölunda HC

==== Slovakia ====
Pos.	No.	Player	Team	NHL rights
GK	30	Tomáš Hiadlovský	(Slovakia) HK SR 20 Puchov
GK	1	Július Hudáček	(Slovakia) HK SR 20 Puchov
D	23	Milan Bališ	(Slovakia) HK SR 20 Puchov
D	17	Adam Beňa	(Slovakia) HK SR 20 Puchov
D	8	Marek Biro	(Canada) Windsor Spitfires
D	7	Marek Ďaloga	(Slovakia) HK SR 20 Puchov
D	4	Michal Kozák	(Slovakia) HK SR 20 Puchov
D	3	Kristian Krajčík	(Slovakia) HK SR 20 Puchov
D	26	Juraj Mikuš	(Slovakia) HK SR 20 Puchov	Toronto Maple Leafs
D	5	Marek Zúkal	(Slovakia) HK SR 20 Puchov
F	18	Radoslav Illo	(Slovakia) HK SR 20 Puchov
F	22	Matej Češík	(Slovakia) HK SR 20 Puchov
F	28	Oliver Ďuriš	(Slovakia) HK SR 20 Puchov
F	25	Dalibor Jančovič	(Slovakia) HK SR 20 Puchov
F	15	Milan Jurík	(Slovakia) HK SR 20 Puchov
F	14	Patrik Lušňák	(Canada) Sudbury Wolves
F	6	Tomáš Marcinko	(Canada) Barrie Colts	New York Islanders
F	12	Ivan Roháč	(Canada) Kamloops Blazers
F		Ondrej Rusnák	(Slovakia) HK SR 20 Puchov
F	29	Július Šinkovič	(Canada) Val-d'Or Foreurs
F	19	Dávid Skokan	(Canada) Rimouski Océanic New York Rangers
F	9	Marek Slovák	(Slovakia) HK SR 20 Puchov
F	11	Jakub Suja	(Slovakia) HK SR 20 Puchov

==== Sweden ====
Pos.	No.	Player	Team	NHL rights
GK	1	Jhonas Enroth	(Sweden) Södertälje SK	Buffalo Sabres
GK	30	Stefan Ridderwall	(Sweden) Djurgårdens IF Hockey	New York Islanders
D	9	Niclas Andersén	(Sweden) Brynäs IF	Los Angeles Kings
D	4	Kristofer Berglund	(Sweden) IF Björklöven
D	7	Jonathan Carlsson	(Sweden) Brynäs IF
D	8	Oscar Eklund	(Sweden) Djurgårdens IF Hockey
D	6	Victor Hedman	(Sweden) Modo Hockey	Draft-Eligible 2009
D	2	Eric Moe	(Sweden) Timrå IK
D	3	Johan Motin	(Sweden) Bofors IK
F	29	Johan Alcén	(Sweden) Brynäs IF	Colorado Avalanche
F	18	Joakim Andersson	(Sweden) Borås HC	Detroit Red Wings
F	22	Mikael Backlund	(Sweden) VIK Västerås HK	Calgary Flames
F	15	Patrik Berglund	(Sweden) VIK Västerås HK	St. Louis Blues
F	23	Robin Figren	(Canada) Edmonton Oil Kings	New York Islanders
F	16	Tobias Forsberg	(Sweden) Modo Hockey
F	12	Carl Hagelin	(United States) University of Michigan	New York Rangers
F	10	Mario Kempe	(Canada) St. John's Fog Devils	Philadelphia Flyers
F	25	Tony Lagerström	(Sweden) Södertälje SK	Chicago Blackhawks
F	24	Thomas Larsson	(Sweden) Skellefteå AIK
F	17	Patrik Lundh	(Sweden) Malmö Redhawks
F	26	Oscar Möller	(Canada) Chilliwack Bruins	Los Angeles Kings
F	21	Magnus Pääjärvi-Svensson	(Sweden) Timrå IK

=== Group B ===
==== Finland ====
Pos.	No.	Player	Team	NHL rights
GK	1	Riku Helenius	(United States) Seattle Thunderbirds	Tampa Bay Lightning
GK	30	Harri Säteri	(Finland) Tappara
D	7	Joonas Jalvanti	(Finland) Pelicans
D	3	Joonas Järvinen	(Finland) TPS
D	8	Mikko Kousa	(Finland) Pelicans
D	9	Ville Lajunen	(Finland) Blues
D	6	Joonas Lehtivuori	(Finland) Ilves	Philadelphia Flyers
D	4	Miko Malkamäki	(Finland) Tappara
D	2	Juha-Petteri Purolinna	(Finland) HIFK
F	21	Nico Aaltonen	(Finland) Lukko
F	27	Jan-Mikael Juutilainen	(United States) Waterloo Blackhawks
F	24	Joonas Kemppainen	(Finland) Ässät
F	28	Nestori Lähde	(Finland) Tappara
F	14	Siim Liivik	(United States) Waterloo Blackhawks
F	26	Niclas Lucenius	(Finland) Tappara	Atlanta Thrashers
F	15	Jarkko Malinen	(Finland) KalPa
F	19	Harri Pesonen	(Finland) JYP
F	16	Eetu Pöysti	(Finland) HIFK
F	10	Juuso Puustinen	(Canada) Kamloops Blazers Calgary Flames
F	20	Tomi Sallinen	(Finland) Espoo Blues
F	23	Sakari Salminen	(Finland) Ässät
F	18	Max Wärn	(Finland) HIFK

==== Kazakhstan ====
Pos.	No.	Player	Team
GK	30	Sergei Rudolf	(Kazakhstan) Barys Astana
GK	1	Mikhail Smolnikov	(Kazakhstan) Kazzinc-Torpedo
D	14	Evgeny Bolyakin	(Kazakhstan) Irtysh Pavlodar
D	16	Konstantin Fast	(Kazakhstan) Kazakhmys Satpaev
D	13	Aleksandr Gerasimov	(Kazakhstan) Irtysh Pavlodar
D	9	Aleksandr Kurshuk	(Kazakhstan) Kazzinc-Torpedo
D	23	Damir Ramazanov	(Kazakhstan) Kazzinc-Torpedo
D	4	Roman Savchenko	(Kazakhstan) Kazzinc-Torpedo
D	15	Dmitri Tikhonov	(Kazakhstan) Irtysh Pavlodar
D	28	Evgeny Tumashov	(Kazakhstan) Kazzinc-Torpedo
F	19	Evgeny Gasnikov	(Kazakhstan) Kazzinc-Torpedo
F	8	Nikita Ivanov	(Kazakhstan) Barys Astana
F	11	Mikhail Kachulin	(Kazakhstan) Kazzinc-Torpedo
F	7	Aleksandr Kaznacheyev	(Kazakhstan) Kazzinc-Torpedo
F	25	Kirill Kitsyn	(Russia) Metallurg Novokuznetsk
F	17	Rostislav Koreshkov	(Kazakhstan) Barys Astana
F	24	Eduard Mazula	(Kazakhstan) Irtysh Pavlodar
F	29	Semen Paramzin	(Kazakhstan) Kazzinc-Torpedo
F	18	Evgeny Rymarev	(Kazakhstan) Kazzinc-Torpedo
F	26	Konstantin Savenkov	(Kazakhstan) Kazzinc-Torpedo
F	21	Stanislav Vitoshkin	(Kazakhstan) Barys Astana
F	12	Yakov Vorobiev	(Kazakhstan) Kazzinc-Torpedo

==== Russia ====
Pos.	No.	Player	Team	NHL rights
GK	1	Sergei Bobrovsky	(Russia) Metallurg Novokuznetsk
GK	30	Stanislav Galimov	(Russia) AK Bars Kazan
D	23	Yuri Alexandrov	(Russia) Severstal Cherepovets	Boston Bruins
D	28	Maxim Chudinov	(Russia) Severstal Cherepovets
D	3	Pavel Doronin	(Russia) Salavat Yulaev Ufa
D	6	Marat Kalimulin	(Russia) HC Lada Togliatti
D	8	Evgeni Kurbatov	(Russia) Avangard Omsk
D	20	Yakov Seleznev	(Russia) Neftyanik Almetyevsk
D	24	Vyacheslav Voinov	(Russia) Traktor Chelyabinsk	Draft-Eligible 2008
F	12	Artem Anisimov	(United States) Hartford Wolf Pack	New York Rangers
F	10	Evgeny Bodrov	(Russia) HC Lada Togliatti
F	7	Alexei Cherepanov	(Russia) Avangard Omsk	New York Rangers
F	27	Evgeny Dadonov	(Russia) Traktor Chelyabinsk
F	21	Nikita Filatov	(Russia) CSKA Moscow	Draft-Eligible 2008
F	16	Vadim Golubtsov	(Russia) Amur Khabarovsk
F	9	Artyom Gordeyev	(Russia) Salavat Yulaev Ufa
F	13	Anton Korolev	(Russia) Neftyanik Leninogorsk
F	18	Dmitri Kugryshev	(Russia) CSKA Moscow
F	15	Maxim Mamin	(Russia) Metallurg Magnitogorsk
F	29	Mikhail Milekhin	(Russia) Krylia Sovetov Moscow
F	17	Dmitri Sayustov	(Russia) Torpedo Nizhny Novgorod
F	11	Viktor Tikhonov	(Russia) Severstal Cherepovets	Draft-Eligible 2008

==== Switzerland ====
Pos.	No.	Player	Team	NHL rights
GK	30	Lukas Flueler	(Switzerland) GCK Lions
GK	20	Robert Mayer	(Canada) Saint John Sea Dogs
D	3	Patrick Geering	(Switzerland) GCK Lions
D	27	Roman Josi	(Switzerland) SC Bern	Draft-Eligible 2008
D	4	Marco Maurer	(Switzerland) EV Zug
D	22	Luca Sbisa	(Canada) Lethbridge Hurricanes	Draft-Eligible 2008
D	5	Lukas Stoop	(Switzerland) HC Davos
D	7	Yannick Weber	(Canada) Kitchener Rangers	Montreal Canadiens
D	2	Marc Welti	(Switzerland) Kloten Flyers
F	29	Gaetan Augsburger	(Switzerland) Genève-Servette HC
F	25	Pascal Berger	(Switzerland) SC Bern
F	19	Andrei Bykov	(Switzerland) HC Fribourg-Gottéron
F	15	Gianni Donati	(Switzerland) HC Davos
F	10	Etienne Froidevaux	(Switzerland) SC Bern
F	11	Denis Hollenstein	(Canada) Guelph Storm
F	17	Arnauld Jacquemet	(Canada) Kootenay Ice
F	23	Aurelio Lemm	(Switzerland) ZSC Lions
F	13	Kevin Lotscher	(Switzerland) Lausanne HC
F	18	Gregory Sciaroni	(Switzerland) HC Ambri-Piotta
F	8	Roman Schlagenhauf	(Switzerland) Kloten Flyers
F	24	Reto Suri	(Switzerland) Kloten Flyers
F	6	Dino Wieser	(Switzerland) HC Davos

==== United States ====
Pos.	No.	Player	Team	NHL rights
GK	34	Joe Palmer	(United States) Ohio State Buckeyes
GK	30	Jeremy Smith	(United States) Plymouth Whalers	Nashville Predators
D	24	Jonathon Blum	(Canada) Vancouver Giants	Nashville Predators
D	28	Ian Cole	(United States) Notre Dame Fighting Irish	St. Louis Blues
D	27	Cade Fairchild	(United States) University of Minnesota
D	4	Jamie McBain	(United States) Wisconsin Badgers	Carolina Hurricanes
D	23	Kevin Montgomery	(Canada) London Knights	Colorado Avalanche
D	20	Bobby Sanguinetti	(Canada) Brampton Battalion	New York Rangers
D	7	Brian Strait	(United States) Boston University	Pittsburgh Penguins
D	24	Chris Summers	(United States) Michigan Wolverines	Phoenix Coyotes
F	19	Mike Carman	(United States) University of Minnesota
F	22	Ryan Flynn	(United States) University of Minnesota
F	5	Blake Geoffrion	(United States) Wisconsin Badgers	Nashville Predators
F	9	Kyle Okposo	(United States) University of Minnesota	New York Islanders
F	17	Max Pacioretty	(United States) University of Michigan	Montreal Canadiens
F	10	Rhett Rakhshani	(United States) University of Denver
F	15	Tyler Ruegsegger	(United States) University of Denver
F	11	Matt Rust	(United States) Michigan Wolverines	Columbus Blue Jackets
F	29	Jordan Schroeder	(United States) U.S. National Team
F	21	Bill Sweatt	(United States) Colorado College	Chicago Blackhawks
F	12	James van Riemsdyk	(United States) University of New Hampshire	Philadelphia Flyers
F	33	Colin Wilson	(United States) Boston University

== See also ==
- 2008 World Junior Ice Hockey Championships
- 2008 World Junior Ice Hockey Championships - Division I
- 2008 World Junior Ice Hockey Championships - Division II
- 2008 World Junior Ice Hockey Championships - Division III
