= 2008 World Junior Ice Hockey Championships =

World Junior Ice Hockey Championships

2008 IIHF World U20 Championship

Tournament details
- Host country: Czech Republic
- Cities: Pardubice, Liberec
- Venue(s): ČEZ Arena and Tipsport Arena (in 2 host cities)
- Dates: 26 December 2007 – 5 January 2008
- Teams: 10

Final positions
- Champions: Canada (14th title)
- Runners-up: Sweden
- Third place: Russia
- Fourth place: United States

Tournament statistics
- Games played: 31
- Goals scored: 197 (6.35 per game)
- Attendance: 103,179 (3,328 per game)
- Scoring leader(s): (United States) James van Riemsdyk (11 points)

Awards
- MVP: (Canada) Steve Mason

The 2008 IIHF World U20 Championship, commonly referred to as the 2008 World Junior Ice Hockey Championships (2008 WJHC), was the 32nd edition of the Ice Hockey World Junior Championship. The tournamement was held in Pardubice and Liberec, Czech Republic, between 26 December 2007 and 5 January 2008. Canada won the gold medal for the fourth consecutive time. Sweden earned its first World Junior medal since 1996 by reaching the final.

== Top Division ==
=== Venues ===
| ČEZ Aréna Capacity: 10,194 | Tipsport Arena Capacity: 7,500 |
| Czech Republic – Pardubice | Czech Republic – Liberec |

=== Preliminary round ===
All times are local (UTC+1).

==== Group A ====
| Pos | Team | Pld | W | OTW | OTL | L | GF | GA | GD | Pts | Qualification |
|---|---|---|---|---|---|---|---|---|---|---|---|
| 1 | Sweden | 4 | 4 | 0 | 0 | 0 | 22 | 9 | +13 | 12 | Semifinals |
| 2 | Canada | 4 | 3 | 0 | 0 | 1 | 12 | 5 | +7 | 9 | Quarterfinals |
| 3 | Czech Republic (H) | 4 | 2 | 0 | 0 | 2 | 12 | 11 | +1 | 6 | Quarterfinals |
| 4 | Slovakia | 4 | 1 | 0 | 0 | 3 | 9 | 14 | −5 | 3 | Relegation round |
| 5 | Denmark | 4 | 0 | 0 | 0 | 4 | 7 | 23 | −16 | 0 | Relegation round |

Source: IIHF
(H) Host

| 26 December 2007; 16:00 | Sweden | 4–3 (2–1, 0–0, 2–2) | Slovakia | ČEZ Arena, Pardubice; Attendance: 7,692 |

Game reference
Robin Figren 10:20 (SH); Patrik Berglund 16:14 (PP); Robin Figren 48:05 (PP); Johan Alcén 55:03 (PP) / Goals / Milan Bališ 02:10 (PP2); Ivan Roháč 48:56; Tomáš Marcinko 50:15

| 26 December 2007; 20:00 | Czech Republic | 0–3 (0–0, 0–1, 0–2) | Canada | ČEZ Arena, Pardubice; Attendance: 10,057 |

Game reference
Goals / John Tavares 31:21 (PP); Matthew Halischuk 43:57; John Tavares 51:53 (PP)

| 27 December 2007; 16:00 | Slovakia | 0–2 (0–0, 0–1, 0–1) | Canada | ČEZ Arena, Pardubice; Attendance: 3,657 |

Game reference
Goals / Kyle Turris 20:54 (PP2), 53:20 (PP)

| 27 December 2007; 20:00 | Czech Republic | 5–2 (3–0, 1–2, 1–0) | Denmark | ČEZ Arena, Pardubice; Attendance: 3,260 |

Game reference
Michael Frolík 00:22, 03:26 (PP), 13:09; Jakub Sklenář 23:30; Petr Strapáč 51:41 (PP) / Goals / Kevin Leder 28:00; Sune Hjulmand 33:09 (PP)

| 28 December 2007; 18:00 | Denmark | 1–10 (1–2, 0–4, 0–4) | Sweden | ČEZ Arena, Pardubice; Attendance: 654 |

Game reference
Morten Poulsen 01:06 / Goals / Oscar Möller 07:19; Tobias Forsberg 09:56; Mikael Backlund 26:20 (SH), 32:43 (SH); Tony Lagerström 30:12, 46:29; Robin Figren 34:20; Patrik Berglund 51:58; Magnus Pääjärvi-Svensson 52:30; Patrik Lundh 54:25

| 29 December 2007; 16:00 | Slovakia | 2–5 (0–2, 1–2, 1–1) | Czech Republic | ČEZ Arena, Pardubice; Attendance: 10,194 |

Game reference
Oliver Ďuriš 38:17; Erik Čaládi (PP2) 52:20 / Goals / Jakub Sklenář 7:11, 26:10; Michael Frolík 19:59; Daniel Bártek 24:45; Martin Látal 54:27 (SH)

| 29 December 2007; 20:00 | Canada | 3–4 (1–0, 0–0, 2–4) | Sweden | ČEZ Arena, Pardubice; Attendance: 8,547 |

Game reference
Brad Marchand 19:05; Shawn Matthias 42:17; Claude Giroux 56:18 (PP2) / Goals / Eric Moe 45:14 (PP); Tony Lagerström 46:45; Oscar Möller 49:09 (PP); Tobias Forsberg 59:53

| 31 December 2007; 14:00 | Sweden | 4–2 (1–0, 2–0, 1–2) | Czech Republic | ČEZ Arena, Pardubice; Attendance: 6,272 |

Game reference
Oscar Möller 4:11; Patrik Berglund 23:37 (PP2); Thomas Larsson 24:42; Robin Figren 41:26 / Goals / Antonín Bořuta 40:44 (PP); Jakub Sklenář 50:10

| 31 December 2007; 18:00 | Canada | 4–1 (2–0, 1–0, 1–1) | Denmark | ČEZ Arena, Pardubice; Attendance: 1,158 |

Game reference
Shawn Matthias 12:44 (PP); John Tavares 18:08; Kyle Turris 28:18, 54:42 (PP) / Goals / Mikkel Bødker 49:36 (PP2)

| 30 December 2007; 18:00 | Denmark | 3–4 (0–1, 0–2, 3–1) | Slovakia | ČEZ Arena, Pardubice; Attendance: 468 |

Game reference
Mikkel Bødker 43:36 (PP); Nichlas Hardt 48:01; Morten Poulsen 59:35 (PP) / Goals / Ivan Roháč 8:25 (PP); Matej Češík 27:43; Erik Čaládi 31:06 (PP2); Marek Slovák 48:24

==== Group B ====
| Pos | Team | Pld | W | OTW | OTL | L | GF | GA | GD | Pts | Qualification |
|---|---|---|---|---|---|---|---|---|---|---|---|
| 1 | United States | 4 | 4 | 0 | 0 | 0 | 17 | 8 | +9 | 12 | Semifinals |
| 2 | Russia | 4 | 3 | 0 | 0 | 1 | 18 | 14 | +4 | 9 | Quarterfinals |
| 3 | Finland | 4 | 1 | 1 | 0 | 2 | 16 | 15 | +1 | 5 | Quarterfinals |
| 4 | Kazakhstan | 4 | 1 | 0 | 0 | 3 | 8 | 16 | −8 | 3 | Relegation round |
| 5 | Switzerland | 4 | 0 | 0 | 1 | 3 | 9 | 15 | −6 | 1 | Relegation round |

Source: IIHF

| 26 December 2007; 16:00 | United States | 5–1 (1–1, 2–0, 2–0) | Kazakhstan | Tipsport Arena, Liberec; Attendance: 1,029 |

Game reference
James van Riemsdyk 19:57; Rhett Rakhshani 24:58; Mike Carman 26:23; Colin Wilson 44:11 (PP); Kyle Okposo 57:43 / Goals / Alexandr Kurshuk 14:46 (PP)

| 26 December 2007; 20:00 | Finland | 4–7 (2–1, 0–4, 2–2) | Russia | Tipsport Arena, Liberec; Attendance: 1,720 |

Game reference
Nico Aaltonen 07:20 (PP); Joonas Jalvanti 15:02 (PP); Juuso Puustinen 43:33; Max Wärn 43:59 / Goals / Marat Kalimulin 11:47 (PP); Yevgeni Bodrov 26:26; Vadim Golubtsov 27:32 (PP); Artem Anisimov 32:34; Anton Korolev 34:32; Viktor Tikhonov 40:25 (PP); Dmitri Kugryshev 56:22

| 27 December 2007; 16:00 | Kazakhstan | 4–5 (2–0, 1–4, 1–1) | Russia | Tipsport Arena, Liberec; Attendance: 796 |

Game reference
Evgeny Rymarev 03:58; Konstantin Savenkov 14:21; Yakov Vorobyov 35:47 (PP); Mikhail Kachulin 53:10 / Goals / Viktor Tikhonov 20:25 (PP); Alexei Cherepanov 21:19; Evgenij Kurbatov 31:37; Artyom Gordeyev 36:27; Yuri Alexandrov 53:30

| 27 December 2007; 20:00 | Finland | 4–3 GWS (1–2, 1–0, 1–1) (OT: 0–0) (SO: 1–0) | Switzerland | Tipsport Arena, Liberec; Attendance: 980 |

Game reference
Juuso Puustinen 17:36 (PP); Harri Pesonen 22:45; Jarkko Malinen 43:05; Sakari Salminen GWG / Goals / Kevin Lotscher 09:37; Reto Suri 14:47; Gregory Sciaroni 59:14

| 28 December 2007; 18:00 | Switzerland | 2–4 (0–1, 1–1, 1–2) | United States | Tipsport Arena, Liberec; Attendance: 1,222 |

Game reference
Andrej Bykov 24:17; Arnaud Jacquemet 55:45 (PP) / Goals / Colin Wilson 05:08 (PP), 49:30 (PP2); Bobby Sanguinetti 22:57(PP); James van Riemsdyk 42:27 (PP2)

| 29 December 2007; 16:00 | Kazakhstan | 0–5 (0–1, 0–2, 0–2) | Finland | Tipsport Arena, Liberec; Attendance: 1,354 |

Game reference
Goals / Nico Aaltonen 02:59; Joonas Kemppainen 23:37 (PP), 26:37; Niclas Lucenius 46:17 (PP2); Juuso Puustinen 48:30

| 29 December 2007; 20:00 | Russia | 2–3 (0–1, 1–0, 1–2) | United States | Tipsport Arena, Liberec; Attendance: 4,654 |

Game reference
Alexei Cherepanov 28:36; Viktor Tikhonov 54:36 / Goals / Tyler Ruegsegger 11:31 (PP2); James van Riemsdyk 43:01 (PP); Mike Carman 47:44

| 30 December 2007; 18:00 | Switzerland | 1–3 (0–1, 0–1, 1–1) | Kazakhstan | Tipsport Arena, Liberec; Attendance: 513 |

Game reference
Yannick Weber 53:49 (PP) / Goals / Yakov Vorobiev 7:39, 28;19 (PP); Evgeny Rymarev 59:07

| 31 December 2007; 14:00 | Russia | 4–3 (1–1, 2–1, 1–1) | Switzerland | Tipsport Arena, Liberec; Attendance: 551 |

Game reference
Anton Korolev 1:31; Dmitri Sayustov 20:46 (PP2); Artyom Gordeyev 37:49; Viktor Tikhonov 55:31 / Goals / Arnauld Jacquemet 9:41 (PP); Dino Wieser 28:45; Marco Maurer 57:40

| 31 December 2007; 18:00 | United States | 5–3 (2–0, 3–0, 0–3) | Finland | Tipsport Arena, Liberec; Attendance: 1,133 |

Game reference
Colin Wilson 9:29, 13:20 (PP), 21:43; Tyler Ruegsegger 24:44; James van Riemsdyk 29:14 / Goals / Nico Aaltonen 50:52 (PP); Mikko Kousa 55:21 (PP); Niclas Lucenius 59:14

=== Relegation round ===
| Pos | Team | Pld | W | OTW | OTL | L | GF | GA | GD | Pts | Relegation |
|---|---|---|---|---|---|---|---|---|---|---|---|
| 7 | Slovakia | 3 | 3 | 0 | 0 | 0 | 17 | 5 | +12 | 9 | |
| 8 | Kazakhstan | 3 | 2 | 0 | 0 | 1 | 9 | 12 | −3 | 6 | |
| 9 | Switzerland | 3 | 1 | 0 | 0 | 2 | 8 | 10 | −2 | 3 | Relegated to the 2009 Division I |
| 10 | Denmark | 3 | 0 | 0 | 0 | 3 | 8 | 15 | −7 | 0 | Relegated to the 2009 Division I |

Source: IIHF

| 2 January 2008; 16:00 | Slovakia | 5–2 (1–0, 2–0, 2–2) | Switzerland | Tipsport Arena, Liberec; Attendance: 564 |

Game reference
Marek Slovák 5:50 (PP); Dalibor Jančovič 31:13; Tomáš Marcinko 39:48; Erik Čaládi 58:54 (ENG); Juraj Mikuš 59:51 (ENG) / Goals / Étienne Froidevaux 40:40; Aurelio Lemm 46:07 (PP)

| 2 January 2008; 20:00 | Kazakhstan | 6–3 (1–0, 2–2, 3–1) | Denmark | Tipsport Arena, Liberec; Attendance: 149 |

Game reference
Evgeny Gasnikov 08:53 (PP); Yakov Vorobiev 33:42; Evgeny Rymarev 38:36 (SH), 52:08 (PP), 59:11 (ENG), 59:25 (ENG) / Goals / Lars Eller 22:38 (PP), 38:59 (PP); Nichlas Hardt 43:43 (PP)

| 3 January 2008; 16:00 | Switzerland | 5–2 (1–1, 2–1, 2–0) | Denmark | Tipsport Arena, Liberec; Attendance: 251 |

Game reference
Yannick Weber 15:31; Aurelio Lemm 32:36, 39:29 (PP); Reto Suri 43:12; Roman Schlagenhauf 58:37 (PP) / Goals / Lars Eller 04:38; Philip Larsen 26:57 (PP)

| 3 January 2008; 20:00 | Slovakia | 8–0 (4–0, 3–0, 1–0) | Kazakhstan | Tipsport Arena, Liberec; Attendance: 359 |

Game reference
Oliver Ďuriš 6:40; Dávid Skokan 14:00 (PP), 19:39 (PP2); Ivan Roháč 15:45; Erik Čaládi 32:33 (PP); Patrik Lušňák 35:13 (PP), 37:32; Dalibor Jančovič 50:05 / Goals

=== Final round ===
==== Bracket ====
Quarter-Finals
B2 | Russia | 4
A3 | Czech Republic | 1
A2 | Canada | 4
B3 | Finland | 2

Semi-Finals
A1 | Sweden (OT) | 2
B2 | Russia | 1
B1 | United States | 1
A2 | Canada | 4

Gold Medal Game
A1 | Sweden | 2
A2 | Canada (OT) | 3
Bronze Medal Game
B1 | United States | 2
B2 | Russia | 4

==== Quarterfinals ====
| 2 January 2008; 16:00 | Canada | 4–2 (0–1, 1–0, 3–1) | Finland | ČEZ Arena, Pardubice; Attendance: 5,187 |

Game reference
John Tavares 27:23 (PP); Steven Stamkos 42:20; Brad Marchand 50:32; Stefan Legein 59:30 (ENG) / Goals / Juuso Puustinen 7:23; Jan-Mikael Juutilainen 45:42

| 2 January 2008; 20:00 | Russia | 4–1 (0–0, 3–1, 1–0) | Czech Republic | ČEZ Arena, Pardubice; Attendance: 8,420 |

Game reference

Sergei Bobrovsky
Goalies
Michal Neuvirth
Referees:
(Switzerland) Danny Kurmann
(United States) Thomas Stearns
Linesmen:
(United States) Peter Feola
(Germany) Felix Winnekens

| Seleznev (Filatov, Mamin) – 27:58 | 1–0 |
| Tikhonov (Golubtsov) (PP) – 35:04 | 2–0 |
| Filatov (Anisimov, Kugryshev) – 36:57 | 3–0 |
| | 3–1 | 37:20 – Meidl (Voráček) |
| Korolev (Bodrov) – 50:10 | 4–1 |

14 min
Penalties
16 min
25
Shots
13

==== Fifth place game ====
| 3 January 2008; 18:00 | Czech Republic | 5–1 (0–1, 3–0, 2–0) | Finland | ČEZ Arena, Pardubice; Attendance: 483 |

Game reference
Daniel Bártek 26:44; Michael Frolík 27:59; Tomáš Kundrátek 39:20 (PP); Zbyněk Hampl 47:46; Martin Látal 57:07 (ENG) / Goals / Harri Pesonen

==== Semifinals ====
| 4 January 2008; 16:00 | Sweden | 2–1 OT (0–0, 0–1, 1–0) (OT: 1–0) | Russia | ČEZ Arena, Pardubice; Attendance: 3,286 |

Game reference

Jhonas Enroth
Goalies
Sergei Bobrovsky
Referees:
(Switzerland) Danny Kurmann
(Czech Republic) Vladimír Šindler
Linesmen:
(Czech Republic) Petr Blümel
(Canada) Jeff Jobson

| | 0–1 | 38:27 – Filatov (Cherepanov) |
| Figren (Andersson, Moe) (PP) – 51:50 | 1–1 |
| Backlund (Pääjärvi, Moe) – 66:18 | 2–1 |

8 min
Penalties
12 min
38
Shots
24

| 4 January 2008; 20:00 | United States | 1–4 (0–0, 0–2, 1–2) | Canada | ČEZ Arena, Pardubice; Attendance: 5,621 |

Game reference
James van Riemsdyk 53:26 / Goals / Shawn Matthias 22:46; Karl Alzner 30:00 (PP); Colton Gillies 47:04; Brad Marchand 47:24

==== Bronze medal game ====
| 5 January 2008; 16:00 | United States | 2–4 (0–3, 1–1, 1–0) | Russia | ČEZ Arena, Pardubice; Attendance: 5,468 |

Game reference

Jeremy Smith
Joe Palmer
Goalies
Sergei Bobrovsky
Referees:
(Switzerland) Danny Kurmann
(Finland) Jyri Petteri Ronn
Linesmen:
(Canada) Jeff Jobson
(Germany) Felix Winnekens

| | 0–1 | 03:59 – Cherepanov (Filatov, Mamin) |
| | 0–2 | 11:04 – Kurbatov (Tikhonov) (PP) |
| | 0–3 | 16:57 – Filatov (Cherepanov) |
| | 0–4 | 21:30 – Filatov (Mamin, Cherepanov) (PP) |
| Rakhshani (Okposo) – 30:47 | 1–4 |
| Schroeder (Sanguinetti) (PP2) – 53:39 | 2–4 |

24 min
Penalties
12 min
21
Shots
25

==== Final ====
| 5 January 2008; 20:00 | Sweden | 2–3 OT (0–2, 0–0, 2–0) (OT: 0–1) | Canada | ČEZ Arena, Pardubice; Attendance: 7,480 |

Game reference

Jhonas Enroth
Goalies
Steve Mason
Referees:
(Russia) Vyacheslav Bulanov
(Czech Republic) Vladimír Šindler
Linesmen:
(United States) Peter Feola
(Slovakia) Milan Mášik

| | 0–1 | 01:27 – Marchand |
| | 0–2 | 17:01 – Giroux (Marchand, Turris) (PP) |
| Carlsson (Alcén, P. Berglund) (PP) – 45:13 | 1–2 |
| Larsson (EA) – 59:22 | 2–2 |
| | 2–3 | 63:36 – Halischuk |

10 min
Penalties
8 min
28
Shots
21

=== Scoring leaders ===
| Pos | Player | Country | GP | G | A | Pts | +/− | PIM |
|---|---|---|---|---|---|---|---|---|
| 1 | James van Riemsdyk | United States | 6 | 5 | 6 | 11 | +4 | 2 |
| 2 | Nikita Filatov | Russia | 7 | 4 | 5 | 9 | +7 | 10 |
| 3 | Marek Slovák | Slovakia | 6 | 2 | 7 | 9 | +2 | 12 |
| 4 | Kyle Turris | Canada | 7 | 4 | 4 | 8 | +3 | 2 |
| 5 | Arnaud Jacquemet | Switzerland | 6 | 2 | 6 | 8 | +1 | 4 |
| 5 | Dávid Skokan | Slovakia | 6 | 2 | 6 | 8 | +1 | 6 |
| 7 | Jordan Schroeder | United States | 6 | 1 | 7 | 8 | +1 | 2 |
| 8 | Yevgeni Rymarev | Kazakhstan | 6 | 6 | 1 | 7 | +2 | 0 |
| 8 | Colin Wilson | United States | 5 | 6 | 1 | 7 | +2 | 4 |
| 10 | Robin Figren | Sweden | 6 | 5 | 2 | 7 | +4 | 2 |

GP = Games played; G = Goals; A = Assists; Pts = Points; +/− = Plus–minus; PIM = Penalties In Minutes
Source: IIHF

==== Goaltending leaders ====
(minimum 40% team's total ice time)

| Pos | Player | Country | TOI | GA | GAA | SA | Sv% | SO |
|---|---|---|---|---|---|---|---|---|
| 1 | Steve Mason | Canada | 303:36 | 6 | 1.19 | 123 | 95.12 | 1 |
| 2 | Július Hudáček | Slovakia | 359:08 | 16 | 2.67 | 202 | 92.08 | 1 |
| 3 | Sergei Bobrovsky | Russia | 366:07 | 15 | 2.46 | 184 | 91.85 | 0 |
| 4 | Michal Neuvirth | Czech Republic | 240:00 | 10 | 2.50 | 111 | 90.99 | 0 |
| 5 | Jhonas Enroth | Sweden | 308:56 | 12 | 2.33 | 126 | 90.48 | 0 |

TOI = Time on ice (minutes:seconds); GA = Goals against; GAA = Goals against average; SA = Shots against; Sv% = Save percentage; SO = Shutouts
Source: IIHF

=== Awards ===
- Best players selected by the Directorate:
  - Best Goaltender: (Canada) Steve Mason
  - Best Defenceman: (Canada) Drew Doughty
  - Best Forward: (Russia) Viktor Tikhonov
  - MVP: (Canada) Steve Mason

Source: IIHF

- Media All-Stars:
  - Goaltender: (Canada) Steve Mason
  - Defencemen: (Sweden) Victor Hedman / (Canada) Drew Doughty
  - Forwards: (Sweden) Patrik Berglund / (Russia) Viktor Tikhonov / (United States) James van Riemsdyk

Source: IIHF

=== Final standings ===
| | Team |
|---|---|
| 1st place, gold medalist(s) | Canada |
| 2nd place, silver medalist(s) | Sweden |
| 3rd place, bronze medalist(s) | Russia |
| 4th | United States |
| 5th | Czech Republic |
| 6th | Finland |
| 7th | Slovakia |
| 8th | Kazakhstan |
| 9th | Switzerland |
| 10th | Denmark |

Relegated to the 2009 Division I

== Division I ==
The Division I Championships were played from 9 to 15 December 2007 in Bad Tölz, Germany (Group A), and from 12 to 18 December 2007 in Riga, Latvia (Group B).

=== Group A ===
| Pos | Team | Pld | W | OTW | OTL | L | GF | GA | GD | Pts | Promotion or relegation |
|---|---|---|---|---|---|---|---|---|---|---|---|
| 1 | Germany (H) | 5 | 5 | 0 | 0 | 0 | 42 | 6 | +36 | 15 | Promoted to the 2009 Top Division |
| 2 | Austria | 5 | 4 | 0 | 0 | 1 | 36 | 11 | +25 | 12 | |
| 3 | Norway | 5 | 3 | 0 | 0 | 2 | 19 | 16 | +3 | 9 | |
| 4 | Poland | 5 | 1 | 0 | 1 | 3 | 7 | 24 | −17 | 4 | |
| 5 | Ukraine | 5 | 0 | 1 | 1 | 3 | 10 | 26 | −16 | 3 | |
| 6 | Lithuania | 5 | 0 | 1 | 0 | 4 | 8 | 39 | −31 | 2 | Relegated to the 2009 Division II |

Source: IIHF
(H) Host

=== Group B ===
| Pos | Team | Pld | W | OTW | OTL | L | GF | GA | GD | Pts | Promotion or relegation |
|---|---|---|---|---|---|---|---|---|---|---|---|
| 1 | Latvia (H) | 5 | 4 | 0 | 0 | 1 | 28 | 9 | +19 | 12 | Promoted to the 2009 Top Division |
| 2 | Belarus | 5 | 4 | 0 | 0 | 1 | 21 | 8 | +13 | 12 | |
| 3 | Slovenia | 5 | 3 | 1 | 0 | 1 | 17 | 8 | +9 | 11 | |
| 4 | Hungary | 5 | 2 | 0 | 0 | 3 | 17 | 21 | −4 | 6 | |
| 5 | France | 5 | 1 | 0 | 0 | 4 | 14 | 29 | −15 | 3 | |
| 6 | Great Britain | 5 | 0 | 0 | 1 | 4 | 8 | 30 | −22 | 1 | Relegated to the 2009 Division II |

Source: IIHF
(H) Host

== Division II ==
The Division II Championships were played from 9 to 15 December 2007 in Canazei, Italy (Group A), and from 10 to 16 December 2007 in Tallinn, Estonia (Group B).

=== Group A ===
| Pos | Team | Pld | W | OTW | OTL | L | GF | GA | GD | Pts | Promotion or relegation |
|---|---|---|---|---|---|---|---|---|---|---|---|
| 1 | Italy (H) | 5 | 5 | 0 | 0 | 0 | 37 | 8 | +29 | 15 | Promoted to the 2009 Division I |
| 2 | Japan | 5 | 4 | 0 | 0 | 1 | 37 | 7 | +30 | 12 | |
| 3 | South Korea | 5 | 3 | 0 | 0 | 2 | 18 | 11 | +7 | 9 | |
| 4 | Belgium | 5 | 1 | 1 | 0 | 3 | 12 | 21 | −9 | 5 | |
| 5 | Romania | 5 | 1 | 0 | 1 | 3 | 13 | 30 | −17 | 4 | |
| 6 | Iceland | 5 | 0 | 0 | 0 | 5 | 7 | 47 | −40 | 0 | Relegated to the 2009 Division III |

Source: IIHF
(H) Host

=== Group B ===
| Pos | Team | Pld | W | OTW | OTL | L | GF | GA | GD | Pts | Promotion or relegation |
|---|---|---|---|---|---|---|---|---|---|---|---|
| 1 | Estonia (H) | 5 | 4 | 1 | 0 | 0 | 35 | 8 | +27 | 14 | Promoted to the 2009 Division I |
| 2 | Netherlands | 5 | 4 | 0 | 1 | 0 | 36 | 5 | +31 | 13 | |
| 3 | Croatia | 5 | 3 | 0 | 0 | 2 | 24 | 19 | +5 | 9 | |
| 4 | Spain | 5 | 2 | 0 | 0 | 3 | 24 | 27 | −3 | 6 | |
| 5 | Mexico | 5 | 1 | 0 | 0 | 4 | 8 | 27 | −19 | 3 | |
| 6 | China | 5 | 0 | 0 | 0 | 5 | 8 | 49 | −41 | 0 | Relegated to the 2009 Division III |

Source: IIHF
(H) Host

== Division III ==
The Division III Championship was played from 16 to 24 January 2008 in Belgrade, Serbia.

| Pos | Team | Pld | W | OTW | OTL | L | GF | GA | GD | Pts | Promotion |
|---|---|---|---|---|---|---|---|---|---|---|---|
| 1 | New Zealand | 6 | 6 | 0 | 0 | 0 | 66 | 15 | +51 | 18 | Promoted to the 2009 Division II |
| 2 | Serbia (H) | 6 | 5 | 0 | 0 | 1 | 55 | 7 | +48 | 15 | Promoted to the 2009 Division II |
| 3 | Armenia | 6 | 4 | 0 | 0 | 2 | 47 | 23 | +24 | 12 | |
| 4 | Australia | 6 | 3 | 0 | 0 | 3 | 44 | 23 | +21 | 9 | |
| 5 | South Africa | 6 | 2 | 0 | 0 | 4 | 26 | 52 | −26 | 6 | |
| 6 | Turkey | 6 | 1 | 0 | 0 | 5 | 18 | 62 | −44 | 3 | |
| 7 | Bulgaria | 6 | 0 | 0 | 0 | 6 | 10 | 84 | −74 | 0 | |

Source: IIHF
(H) Host

== See also ==
- 2008 World Junior Ice Hockey Championships
- 2008 World Junior Ice Hockey Championships – Division I
- 2008 World Junior Ice Hockey Championships – Division II
- 2008 World Junior Ice Hockey Championships – Division III
- 2008 World Junior Ice Hockey Championships rosters

| Preceded by 2007 World Juniors | World Junior Ice Hockey Championships See also: 2008 World Championships | Succeeded by 2009 World Juniors |
