= Eric Moe =

Eric Moe may refer to:

- Eric Moe (ice hockey) (born 1988), Swedish ice hockey player
- Eric Moe (composer) (born 1954), American composer and pianist
