= Maxim Mamin =

Maxim Mamin may refer to:

- Maxim Mamin (ice hockey, born 1988), Russian ice hockey player
- Maxim Mamin (ice hockey, born 1995), Russian ice hockey player
