= Johan Alcén =

Swedish ice hockey player (born 1988)

- Born: 11 March 1988 (age 38) Sandviken, Sweden
- Height: 6 ft 2 in (188 cm)
- Weight: 189 lb (86 kg; 13 st 7 lb)
- Position: Centre
- Shot: Left
- Played for: Brynäs IF; Rögle BK
- NHL draft: 195th overall, 2007; Colorado Avalanche
- Playing career: 2006–2021

Johan Alcén (born 11 March 1988) is a Swedish former professional ice hockey centre (previously a winger) who played with Brynäs IF and Rögle BK in the Swedish Hockey League (SHL).

== Playing career ==
Alcén was drafted by the Colorado Avalanche in the seventh round of the 2007 NHL entry draft, 195th overall. He was drafted from Swedish club, Brynäs IF, where he spent time between the J20 SuperElit and the Elitserien. Alcén played with Brynäs for another two seasons, however, after recording only 2 points in 50 games in 2008–09 he signed with Rögle BK on 16 April 2009.

In the 2009–10 season, Johan was again unable to replicate his J20 performances in the SEL as he posted a modest 8 points in 47 games as Rögle succumbed to relegation to the second tier, HockeyAllsvenskan.

On 5 May 2010, Alcén signed a two-year contract with fellow Allsvenskan team, Leksands IF. After one season with Leksands, Alcén was released to join Mora IK on 11 September 2011. Alcén recorded a professional high of 25 points during the 2011–12 season and was rewarded with a two-year contract extension to remain with Mora on 16 April 2012.

After four seasons with Mora, Alcén made a return to the SHL in signing for a second stint with Brynäs IF on 20 August 2015.

On 22 June 2021, after 15 seasons, Alcén announced his retirement from professional hockey, remaining within the Brynäs IF organization as a sports manager.

== Career statistics ==
=== Regular season and playoffs ===
			Regular season					Playoffs
Season	Team	League	GP	G	A	Pts	PIM	GP	G	A	Pts	PIM
2004–05	Brynäs IF	J20	30	9	12	21	16	—	—	—	—	—
2005–06	Brynäs IF	J18 Allsv	2	1	3	4	4	—	—	—	—	—
2005–06	Brynäs IF	J20	39	16	19	35	48	2	0	2	2	0
2005–06	Brynäs IF	SEL	3	0	0	0	0	—	—	—	—	—
2006–07	Brynäs IF	J20	26	17	29	46	46	4	1	1	2	0
2006–07	Brynäs IF	SEL	32	0	0	0	0	1	0	0	0	0
2006–07	IFK Arboga IK	Allsv	2	0	0	0	2	—	—	—	—	—
2007–08	Brynäs IF	J20	7	12	9	21	6	—	—	—	—	—
2007–08	Brynäs IF	SEL	39	4	6	10	14	—	—	—	—	—
2008–09	Brynäs IF	J20	1	3	4	7	0	—	—	—	—	—
2008–09	Brynäs IF	SEL	50	1	1	2	20	4	0	0	0	2
2009–10	Rögle BK	SEL	47	2	6	8	26	—	—	—	—	—
2010–11	Leksands IF	Allsv	31	4	7	11	37	—	—	—	—	—
2010–11	HC Vita Hästen	SWE.3	6	2	5	7	0	1	0	0	0	0
2011–12	Mora IK	Allsv	50	8	17	25	16	—	—	—	—	—
2012–13	Mora IK	Allsv	44	11	14	25	40	—	—	—	—	—
2013–14	Mora IK	Allsv	50	12	26	38	20	—	—	—	—	—
2014–15	Mora IK	Allsv	32	5	4	9	24	5	1	0	1	2
2015–16	Brynäs IF	SHL	50	3	2	5	34	3	0	0	0	2
2016–17	Brynäs IF	SHL	48	5	2	7	4	19	2	8	10	8
2017–18	Brynäs IF	SHL	51	8	5	13	38	5	2	0	2	0
2018–19	Brynäs IF	SHL	50	5	5	10	16	—	—	—	—	—
2019–20	Brynäs IF	SHL	50	1	3	4	10	—	—	—	—	—
2020–21	Brynäs IF	SHL	51	2	2	4	12	—	—	—	—	—
SHL totals			471	31	32	63	174	32	4	8	12	12

Medal record

Ice hockey

Representing Sweden

World Junior Championships
Silver medal – second place	2008 Pardubice	

=== International ===
Year	Team	Event	Result	GP	G	A	Pts	PIM
2008	Sweden	WJC	2nd place, silver medalist(s)	6	1	3	4	2
Junior totals				6	1	3	4	2
