= Shawn Matthias =

Canadian ice hockey player (born 1988)

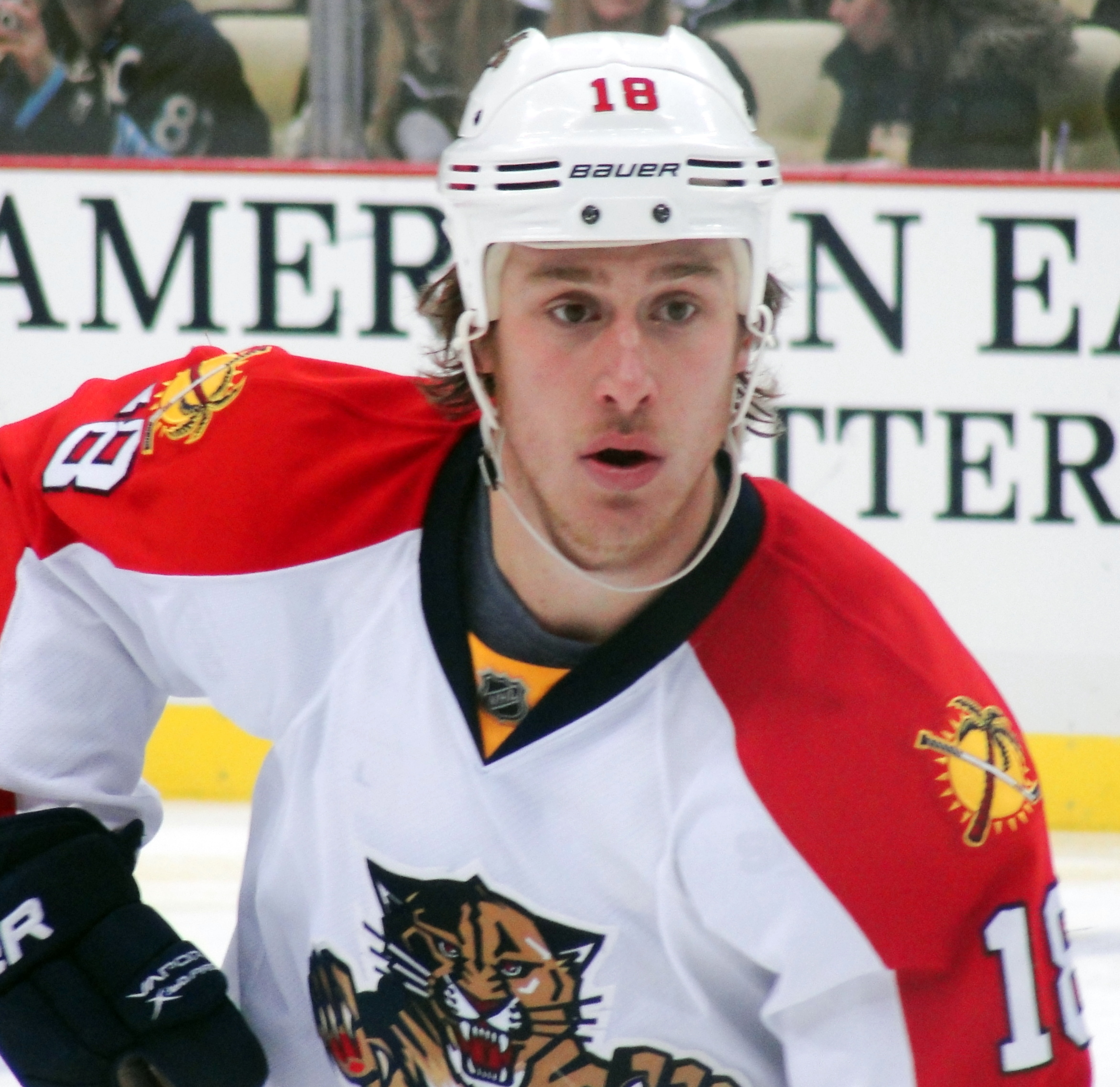
- Matthias skating against the Pittsburgh Penguins in 2012
- Born: February 19, 1988 (age 38) Mississauga, Ontario, Canada
- Height: 6 ft 3 in (191 cm)
- Weight: 231 lb (105 kg; 16 st 7 lb)
- Position: Forward
- Shot: Left
- Played for: Florida Panthers; Vancouver Canucks; Toronto Maple Leafs; Colorado Avalanche; Winnipeg Jets
- NHL draft: 47th overall, 2006; Detroit Red Wings
- Playing career: 2008–2018

Shawn Matthias (born February 19, 1988) is a Canadian former professional ice hockey forward. Matthias played in the NHL, making appearances with the Florida Panthers, Vancouver Canucks, Toronto Maple Leafs, Colorado Avalanche, and Winnipeg Jets. He was originally drafted by the Detroit Red Wings in the second round, 47th overall, at the 2006 NHL entry draft. Matthias was a natural centre early in his career; however, he made the transition to being able to play the wings as well.

== Playing career ==
=== Junior ===
Matthias played his major junior ice hockey career with the Belleville Bulls of the Ontario Hockey League (OHL) before he was drafted by the Detroit Red Wings in the second round, 47th overall, in the 2006 NHL entry draft. In his first season in the OHL, Matthias stood at 6'2 and 170 pounds. During the following season, 2006–07, his rights were traded, along with conditional draft picks to the Florida Panthers in exchange for Todd Bertuzzi on February 27, 2007.

=== Professional ===
On January 18, 2008, the Panthers called up Matthias from Belleville. In his second NHL game on January 19, 2008, he scored his first two goals, both against goaltender Brent Johnson of the Washington Capitals.

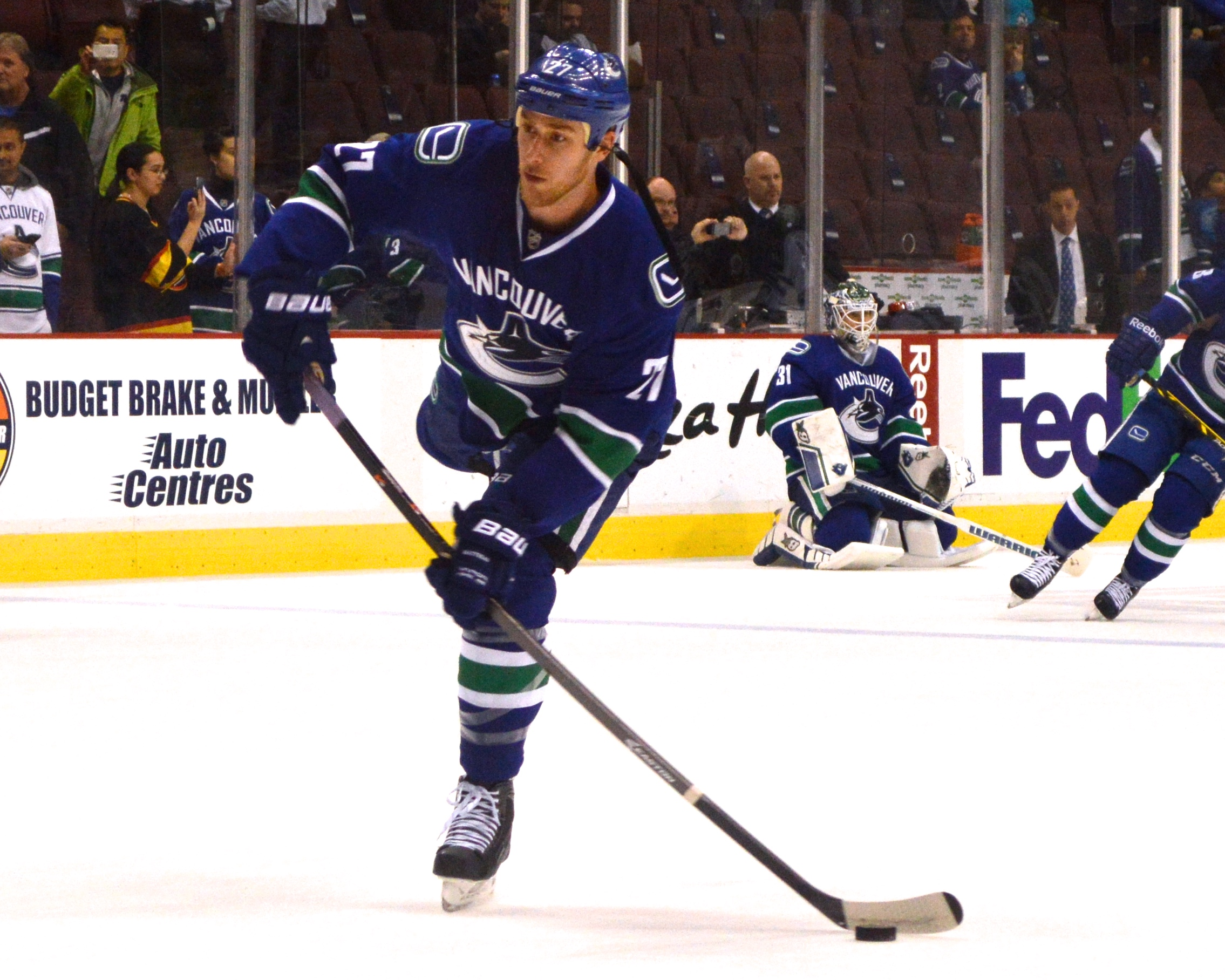
Matthias with the Vancouver Canucks in 2015

On March 4, 2014, Matthias was traded, along with goaltender Jacob Markström, to the Vancouver Canucks in exchange for goaltender Roberto Luongo and Steven Anthony.

On February 13, 2015, Matthias recorded his first career NHL hat-trick in a 5–2 Canucks win over the Boston Bruins.

Despite posting a career-high in goals (18) and points (27) during the 2014–15 season, the Canucks opted not to re-sign Matthias after the expiration of his contract, whereupon on July 6, 2015, he signed a one-year, $2.3 million deal with the Toronto Maple Leafs as an unrestricted free agent. Following the signing, Matthias expressed via Twitter that he was a Maple Leafs fan growing up and that he "couldn't be happier to play for [his] hometown team."

In the 2015–16 season, Matthias made his Maple Leaf debut on opening night in a 3-1 defeat to the Montreal Canadiens on October 7, 2015. Throughout the year, Matthias failed to score at a pace similar to his prior season in Vancouver, but was still seen as a decent producer given his role on the team. After contributing with 17 points in 51 games, on February 21, 2016, Matthias was traded by the rebuilding Maple Leafs to the Colorado Avalanche in exchange for a 4th round pick in the 2016 Entry Draft (Keaton Middleton) and prospect Colin Smith to bolster Colorado's depth for a playoff push, although the team would ultimately not qualify for the post-season.

On July 1, 2016, Matthias left the Avalanche organization as a free agent, agreeing to a two-year deal with Central Division competitors, the Winnipeg Jets.

== International play ==
Medal record

Representing Canada

Ice hockey

World Junior Championships
Gold medal – first place	2008 Pardubice	

Matthias played for Canada at the 2008 World Juniors, where he helped his team win the gold medal.

== Career statistics ==
=== Regular season and playoffs ===
			Regular season					Playoffs
Season	Team	League	GP	G	A	Pts	PIM	GP	G	A	Pts	PIM
2004–05	Belleville Bulls	OHL	37	1	1	2	15	3	0	0	0	0
2005–06	Belleville Bulls	OHL	67	13	21	34	42	6	3	0	3	2
2006–07	Belleville Bulls	OHL	64	38	35	73	61	15	13	5	18	10
2007–08	Belleville Bulls	OHL	53	32	47	79	50	1	1	0	1	0
2007–08	Florida Panthers	NHL	4	2	0	2	2	—	—	—	—	—
2008–09	Florida Panthers	NHL	16	0	2	2	2	—	—	—	—	—
2008–09	Rochester Americans	AHL	61	10	10	20	16	—	—	—	—	—
2009–10	Florida Panthers	NHL	55	7	9	16	10	—	—	—	—	—
2009–10	Rochester Americans	AHL	27	6	7	13	12	7	2	5	7	7
2010–11	Florida Panthers	NHL	51	6	10	16	16	—	—	—	—	—
2011–12	Florida Panthers	NHL	79	10	14	24	49	7	0	1	1	6
2012–13	EHC Liwest Black Wings Linz	EBEL	4	1	2	3	0	—	—	—	—	—
2012–13	Florida Panthers	NHL	48	14	7	21	16	—	—	—	—	—
2013–14	Florida Panthers	NHL	59	9	7	16	14	—	—	—	—	—
2013–14	Vancouver Canucks	NHL	18	3	4	7	12	—	—	—	—	—
2014–15	Vancouver Canucks	NHL	78	18	9	27	16	6	1	1	2	10
2015–16	Toronto Maple Leafs	NHL	51	6	11	17	12	—	—	—	—	—
2015–16	Colorado Avalanche	NHL	20	6	5	11	8	—	—	—	—	—
2016–17	Winnipeg Jets	NHL	45	8	4	12	13	—	—	—	—	—
2017–18	Winnipeg Jets	NHL	27	1	2	3	10	—	—	—	—	—
NHL totals			551	90	84	174	180	13	1	2	3	16

=== International ===
Year	Team	Event	Result	GP	G	A	Pts	PIM
2006	Canada	WJC18	4th	7	1	0	1	2
2008	Canada	WJC	1st place, gold medalist(s)	7	3	1	4	4
Junior totals				14	4	1	5	6
