= Erik Čaládi =

Slovak ice hockey center

- Born: 1 April 1988 (age 37) Nitra, Czechoslovakia
- Height: 5 ft 11 in (180 cm)
- Weight: 176 lb (80 kg; 12 st 8 lb)
- Position: Center
- Shot: Left
- Played for: HK Nitra; HK Levice; HK Orange 20; ŠHK 37 Piešťany; HC Topoľčany; HC Nové Zámky; UTE
- Playing career: 2004–2022

Erik Čaládi (born 1 April 1988) is a Slovak former professional ice hockey center. Currently is the head coach of HK Dukla Michalovce in Tipsport liga.

== Career ==
Čaládi began his career with HK Nitra, playing three games for the team during 2004–05 season. In 2006, he played in the Ontario Hockey League for the Belleville Bulls but would return to Nitra the following year. He remained with Nitra until 2012 when he moved to France to sign for FFHG Division 1 side LHC Les Lions.

Čaládi signed for HC Nové Zámky of the MOL Liga. He stayed for four seasons before moving to HK Poprad on May 4, 2017. However, he never played for the team and he instead signed for UTE of Erste Liga. On April 29, 2018, Čaládi returned to HK Nitra.

He became the inaugural coach of the United States Premier Hockey League team Presque Isle Frontiers in July 2025, but due to visa issues was unable to move to the United States and was ultimately replaced following an ownership change.
