= Viktor Tikhonov (ice hockey, born 1988) =

Russian ice hockey player (born 1988)

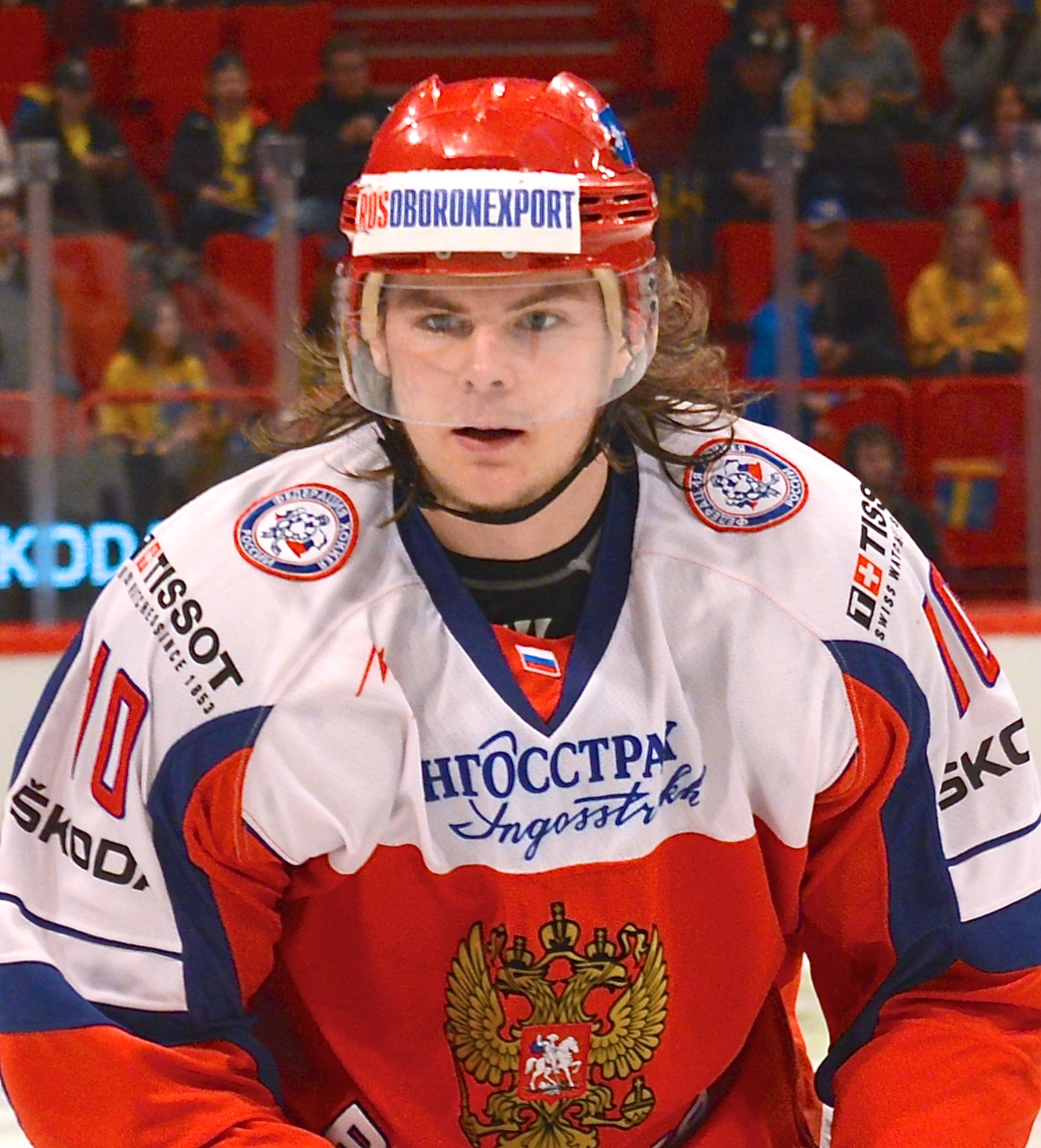
- Tikhonov with Russia in 2014
- Born: 12 May 1988 (age 38) Riga, Latvian SSR, Soviet Union
- Height: 6 ft 2 in (188 cm)
- Weight: 183 lb (83 kg; 13 st 1 lb)
- Position: Center
- Shot: Right
- Played for: Severstal Cherepovets; Arizona Coyotes; SKA Saint Petersburg; Chicago Blackhawks; Ak Bars Kazan; Salavat Yulaev Ufa
- National team: Russia
- NHL draft: 28th overall, 2008; Phoenix Coyotes
- Playing career: 2004–2022

Viktor Vasilievich Tikhonov (Russian: Виктор Васильевич Тихонов; born 12 May 1988) is a Russian former professional ice hockey forward. Tikhonov was originally selected 28th overall in the 2008 NHL entry draft, by the Phoenix Coyotes. After several years in the National Hockey League (NHL) with the Coyotes, Tikhonov moved to the Kontinental Hockey League (KHL) in Russia, where he spent four years with SKA St. Petersburg. In 2015, he returned to the NHL, signing a contract with the Chicago Blackhawks, appearing in 11 games for them before he was claimed on waivers by the Coyotes.

He was named after his grandfather, Viktor Vasilyevich Tikhonov, the late Soviet ice hockey player and coach. His father was Vasili Tikhonov, who was also an ice hockey coach. Born in Latvia while it was still a member of the USSR, Tikhonov has represented Russia internationally, participating in several World Championships and the 2014 Winter Olympics in Sochi, Russia.

== Playing career ==
As a youth, Tikhonov played in the 1999 Quebec International Pee-Wee Hockey Tournament with a minor ice hockey team from Santa Clara.

Tikhonov was drafted 28th overall by the Phoenix Coyotes in the 2008 NHL entry draft from Russian team Severstal Cherepovets. This was his third time entering the draft as he was passed over in his two previous years of eligibility. On 1 July 2008 he was signed by the Coyotes to a three-year entry-level contract. In the following 2008–09 season Tikhonov made the Coyotes' opening-night roster making his NHL debut on 12 October 2008, against the Columbus Blue Jackets. He played in 61 games scoring 8 goals and 16 points before he was assigned to American Hockey League affiliate, the San Antonio Rampage.

Tikhonov started the 2009–10 season in the AHL with the Rampage and played in 18 games before opting to take up a loan to regain form with Severstal Cherepovets of the KHL for the remainder of the season on 27 November 2009. After scoring 14 goals in 25 games, tied for second among Severstal, Tikhonov was recalled by the Coyotes on 13 March 2010. He rejoined the Coyotes as a part of the practice squad as they reached the first round of the playoffs.

In the 2010–11 season, he failed to make the Coyotes' roster for opening night, spending the duration of the year again with the Rampage, posting a then professional high of 33 points in 60 contests.

On 10 August 2011 the Phoenix Coyotes re-signed Tikhonov to a one-year deal. Tikhonov returned to the KHL to play four seasons for SKA Saint Petersburg, helping capture the Gagarin Cup in his final season with Saint Petersburg in 2014–15 season.

As a free agent, Tikhonov returned to play in North America, signing alongside SKA teammate Artemi Panarin, a one-year contract with the defending Stanley Cup Champions, the Chicago Blackhawks on 1 July 2015. He made the Blackhawks squad to open the 2015–16 season, playing his first game in the NHL since 2009 in a 3–2 overtime victory against the New York Islanders on 9 October 2015. Used in a depth role, Tikhonov went scoreless with the Blackhawks in 11 games before he was placed on waivers on 5 December 2015. The following day he was claimed off waivers by his former club, the Arizona Coyotes.

Unable to reach his offensive upside in the NHL, Tikhonov was not tendered a new contract to remain in Arizona, and as a free agent he opted to return to his native Russia, for a second stint with SKA St. Petersburg on a one-year deal on July 17, 2016.

During his eighth season with SKA Saint Petersburg in the 2019–20 season, Tikhonov was traded alongside Roman Rukavishnikov to Ak Bars Kazan in exchange for Igor Ozhiganov on 7 November 2019.

Following two seasons with Ak Bars, Tikhonov left as a free agent and was signed to a two-year contract with Salavat Yulaev Ufa on 2 May 2021.

After 17 seasons, Tikonov announced his retirement from professional hockey due to injury on 4 July 2022.

== International play ==
Medal record

Representing Russia

Men's ice hockey

World Championships
Gold medal – first place	2014 Belarus	
Silver medal – second place	2015 Czech Republic	

World Junior Championships
Bronze medal – third place	2008 Czech Republic	

He won a bronze medal in the 2008 IIHF World Junior Championships with the Russian squad, in a game versus Team USA. He finished the tournament with five goals and two assists in seven games, and was named the Best Forward.

In July 2013 he was named to the preliminary 35-man roster for the Russian 2014 Olympic team. Russia placed 5th with Tikhonov making one assist. He later won a gold medal in the 2014 IIHF World Championship with Russia and led the tournament in scoring.

== Personal life ==
Tikhonov was born in Riga, and grew up in Los Gatos, California and, in 1994, moved with his family to Lexington, Kentucky. He is named after his grandfather, Viktor Tikhonov, who was the head coach of CSKA and the Soviet national team throughout the 1970s and 1980s. His father, Vasili, was the assistant coach for the San Jose Sharks' American Hockey League (AHL) affiliate, the Kentucky Thoroughblades. Viktor was heavily involved in the Santa Clara Valley Blackhawks youth hockey program.

Tikhonov now resides in Brentwood, Tennessee with his wife Genia and two children Lev and Sofia and is currently the Skills Coach for the Nashville Spartans.

== Career statistics ==
=== Regular season and playoffs ===
			Regular season					Playoffs
Season	Team	League	GP	G	A	Pts	PIM	GP	G	A	Pts	PIM
2004–05	CSKA–2 Moscow	RUS.3	59	21	28	49	24	—	—	—	—	—
2005–06	HK Dmitrov	RUS.2	36	6	8	14	10	—	—	—	—	—
2005–06	HK Dmitrov–2	RUS.3	16	5	9	14	6	—	—	—	—	—
2006–07	Severstal–2 Cherepovets	RUS.3	21	14	16	30	20	—	—	—	—	—
2006–07	Severstal Cherepovets	RSL	4	0	0	0	0	—	—	—	—	—
2007–08	Severstal Cherepovets	RSL	43	6	6	12	43	8	0	1	1	4
2008–09	Phoenix Coyotes	NHL	61	8	8	16	20	—	—	—	—	—
2008–09	San Antonio Rampage	AHL	4	2	1	3	0	—	—	—	—	—
2009–10	San Antonio Rampage	AHL	18	2	6	8	12	—	—	—	—	—
2009–10	Severstal Cherepovets	KHL	25	14	1	15	12	—	—	—	—	—
2010–11	San Antonio Rampage	AHL	60	10	23	33	26	—	—	—	—	—
2011–12	SKA Saint Petersburg	KHL	42	17	13	30	18	10	4	2	6	4
2012–13	SKA Saint Petersburg	KHL	39	12	15	27	16	15	10	8	18	20
2013–14	SKA Saint Petersburg	KHL	52	18	16	34	20	10	2	1	3	2
2014–15	SKA Saint Petersburg	KHL	49	8	16	24	29	15	1	1	2	4
2015–16	Chicago Blackhawks	NHL	11	0	0	0	6	—	—	—	—	—
2015–16	Arizona Coyotes	NHL	39	3	3	6	14	—	—	—	—	—
2016–17	SKA Saint Petersburg	KHL	36	6	4	10	13	2	0	0	0	2
2017–18	SKA Saint Petersburg	KHL	45	8	8	16	24	12	3	1	4	16
2018–19	SKA Saint Petersburg	KHL	38	5	7	12	24	16	1	2	3	18
2019–20	SKA Saint Petersburg	KHL	9	1	0	1	6	—	—	—	—	—
2019–20	Ak Bars Kazan	KHL	23	6	4	10	8	4	0	1	1	0
2020–21	Ak Bars Kazan	KHL	42	11	12	23	28	15	3	2	5	0
2021–22	Salavat Yulaev Ufa	KHL	25	5	10	15	12	11	3	3	6	14
NHL totals			111	11	11	22	40	—	—	—	—	—
KHL totals			425	111	106	217	210	110	27	21	48	80

=== International ===
Year	Team	Event	Result	GP	G	A	Pts	PIM
2008	Russia	WJC	3rd place, bronze medalist(s)	7	5	2	7	6
2014	Russia	OG	5th	2	0	1	1	0
2014	Russia	WC	1st place, gold medalist(s)	10	8	8	16	10
2015	Russia	WC	2nd place, silver medalist(s)	10	1	2	3	4
Junior totals				7	5	2	7	6
Senior totals				22	9	11	20	14

== Awards and honors ==
Award	Year
KHL
First All-Star Team	2013
All-Star Game	2014
Gagarin Cup (SKA Saint Petersburg)	2015, 2017
International
WC Leading Scorer	2014
WC Best Forward	2014
WC All-Star Team	2014

Awards and achievements
Preceded by Mikkel Bødker	Phoenix Coyotes first-round draft pick 2008	Succeeded by Oliver Ekman-Larsson
