= Martin Látal =

Czech ice hockey player

- Born: March 17, 1988 (age 38) Kladno, Czechoslovakia
- Height: 6 ft 0 in (183 cm)
- Weight: 176 lb (80 kg; 12 st 8 lb)
- Position: Forward
- Shoots: Left
- EIHL team Former teams: Fife Flyers; HC Kladno; HC Škoda Plzeň; HC Sparta Praha; HC Karlovy Vary; BK Mladá Boleslav; Mountfield HK; HC Dynamo Pardubice; HC Litvinov; Sheffield Steelers; Cracovia Krakow; Brûleurs de Loups
- NHL draft: 131st overall, 2006; Phoenix Coyotes
- Playing career: 2005–present

Martin Látal (born March 17, 1988) is a Czech professional ice hockey forward who last played for the Fife Flyers of the UK Elite Ice Hockey League (EIHL). He was selected by the Phoenix Coyotes in the 5th round (131st overall) of the 2006 NHL entry draft.

Látal first played with HC Kladno in the Czech Extraliga during the 2005–06 Czech Extraliga season.

== Career statistics ==
=== Regular season and playoffs ===
| | | | Regular season | | | | | Playoffs |
| Season | Team | League | GP | G | A | Pts | PIM | GP | G | A | Pts | PIM |
|---|---|---|---|---|---|---|---|---|---|---|---|---|
| 2002–03 | HC Sparta Praha | CZE U18 | 24 | 2 | 6 | 8 | 12 | 2 | 0 | 0 | 0 | 0 |
| 2003–04 | HC Rabat Kladno | CZE U18 | 48 | 15 | 16 | 31 | 69 | 2 | 0 | 1 | 1 | 0 |
| 2003–04 | HC Rabat Kladno | CZE U20 | 1 | 0 | 0 | 0 | 0 | — | — | — | — | — |
| 2004–05 | HC Rabat Kladno | CZE U18 | 3 | 3 | 3 | 6 | 22 | 4 | 3 | 1 | 4 | 10 |
| 2004–05 | HC Rabat Kladno | CZE U20 | 41 | 7 | 8 | 15 | 86 | 6 | 1 | 1 | 2 | 12 |
| 2005–06 | HC Rabat Kladno | CZE U20 | 24 | 14 | 9 | 23 | 62 | 7 | 4 | 1 | 5 | 8 |
| 2005–06 | HC Rabat Kladno | ELH | 20 | 0 | 0 | 0 | 0 | — | — | — | — | — |
| 2005–06 | HC Lasselsberger Plzeň | CZE U20 | 6 | 2 | 1 | 3 | 2 | — | — | — | — | — |
| 2005–06 | HC Lasselsberger Plzeň | ELH | 5 | 0 | 0 | 0 | 4 | — | — | — | — | — |
| 2006–07 | PEI Rocket | QMJHL | 66 | 18 | 28 | 46 | 90 | 7 | 3 | 4 | 7 | 8 |
| 2007–08 | PEI Rocket | QMJHL | 57 | 17 | 28 | 45 | 65 | 3 | 0 | 0 | 0 | 2 |
| 2008–09 | HC Sparta Praha | ELH | 50 | 4 | 6 | 10 | 6 | 7 | 0 | 0 | 0 | 2 |
| 2008–09 | HC Slovan Ústečtí Lvi | CZE.2 | 2 | 0 | 1 | 1 | 0 | — | — | — | — | — |
| 2009–10 | HC Sparta Praha | ELH | 45 | 2 | 7 | 9 | 16 | 7 | 0 | 1 | 1 | 0 |
| 2010–11 | HC Vagnerplast Kladno | ELH | 46 | 4 | 9 | 13 | 16 | — | — | — | — | — |
| 2011–12 | Rytíři Kladno | ELH | 33 | 7 | 9 | 16 | 16 | 3 | 0 | 1 | 1 | 2 |
| 2012–13 | Rytíři Kladno | ELH | 38 | 1 | 4 | 5 | 18 | 9 | 0 | 1 | 1 | 2 |
| 2013–14 | HC Energie Karlovy Vary | ELH | 21 | 0 | 2 | 2 | 4 | — | — | — | — | — |
| 2013–14 | BK Mladá Boleslav | CZE.2 | 10 | 3 | 5 | 8 | 0 | 20 | 3 | 6 | 9 | 12 |
| 2014–15 | BK Mladá Boleslav | ELH | 46 | 10 | 16 | 26 | 32 | 9 | 2 | 2 | 4 | 2 |
| 2015–16 | BK Mladá Boleslav | ELH | 35 | 3 | 8 | 11 | 55 | 8 | 1 | 0 | 1 | 2 |
| 2016–17 | BK Mladá Boleslav | ELH | 51 | 10 | 8 | 18 | 34 | 5 | 1 | 1 | 2 | 4 |
| 2017–18 | BK Mladá Boleslav | ELH | 7 | 0 | 3 | 3 | 12 | — | — | — | — | — |
| 2017–18 | Mountfield HK | ELH | 38 | 5 | 7 | 12 | 10 | 9 | 0 | 0 | 0 | 2 |
| 2018–19 | BK Mladá Boleslav | ELH | 46 | 2 | 10 | 12 | 37 | 10 | 1 | 1 | 2 | 0 |
| 2019–20 | HC Dynamo Pardubice | ELH | 46 | 7 | 8 | 15 | 10 | — | — | — | — | — |
| 2020–21 | HC Verva Litvínov | ELH | 41 | 2 | 3 | 5 | 8 | 3 | 0 | 0 | 0 | 0 |
| 2021–22 | Sheffield Steelers | EIHL | 50 | 21 | 28 | 49 | 28 | 2 | 1 | 0 | 1 | 0 |
| 2022–23 | Sheffield Steelers | EIHL | 51 | 17 | 21 | 38 | 8 | 4 | 1 | 2 | 3 | 2 |
| 2023-24 | Cracovia Krakow | PHL | 32 | 14 | 17 | 31 | 28 | – | – | – | – | – |
| 2023-24 | Brûleurs de Loups | Ligue Magnus | 6 | 2 | 3 | 5 | 4 | 9 | 2 | 2 | 4 | 0 |
| 2024–25 | Fife Flyers | EIHL | 6 | 0 | 1 | 1 | 2 | – | – | – | – | – |
| ELH totals | | | 568 | 57 | 100 | 157 | 278 | 70 | 5 | 7 | 12 | 14 |

=== International ===
| Year | Team | Event | GP | G | A | Pts | PIM |
|---|---|---|---|---|---|---|---|
| 2005 | Czech Republic | U17 | 5 | 2 | 5 | 7 | 4 |
| 2005 | Czech Republic | U18 | 5 | 2 | 2 | 4 | 0 |
| 2006 | Czech Republic | WJC18 | 7 | 1 | 2 | 3 | 37 |
| 2008 | Czech Republic | WJC | 6 | 2 | 0 | 2 | 4 |
| Junior totals | | | 23 | 7 | 9 | 16 | 45 |
