= Jonathan Carlsson =

Swedish ice hockey defenceman

- Born: August 5, 1988 (age 38) Uppsala, Sweden
- Height: 6 ft 1 in (185 cm)
- Weight: 201 lb (91 kg; 14 st 5 lb)
- Position: Defence
- Shoots: Left
- Allsvenskan team Former teams: Timrå IK; Brynäs IF; Rockford IceHogs; HC ’05 Banská Bystrica; Graz 99ers HC TWK Innsbruck; Mora IK
- NHL draft: 162nd overall, 2008; Chicago Blackhawks
- Playing career: 2007–present

Jonathan Carlsson (born August 5, 1988) is a Swedish ice hockey defenceman. He is currently playing with Timrå IK in the HockeyAllsvenskan. Carlsson was selected by the Chicago Blackhawks in the sixth round of the 2008 NHL entry draft.

== Playing career ==
For the beginning of the 2010–11 season, Carlsson was assigned to the Rockford IceHogs in the American Hockey League.

Carlsson spent the 2014–15 season, with Södertälje SK in the Allsvenskan before opting to return to North America in agreeing to a one-year ECHL contract with the Evansville IceMen on September 8, 2015.

In the 2016–17 season, his second successive year spent within the Chicago Blackhawks affiliates in the AHL and ECHL, Carlsson was released by the Rockford IceHogs on February 11, 2017, after securing a contract for the remainder of the campaign in Slovakia with HC ’05 Banská Bystrica.

== Career statistics ==
=== Regular season and playoffs ===
			Regular season					Playoffs
Season	Team	League	GP	G	A	Pts	PIM	GP	G	A	Pts	PIM
2004–05	Brynäs IF	J20	19	1	0	1	6	—	—	—	—	—
2005–06	Brynäs IF	J20	37	2	9	11	24	2	0	1	1	0
2006–07	Brynäs IF	J20	39	12	5	17	16	4	2	1	3	6
2006–07	Brynäs IF	SEL	6	1	0	1	2	—	—	—	—	—
2007–08	Brynäs IF	J20	8	3	2	5	6	4	2	0	2	0
2007–08	Brynäs IF	SEL	26	0	0	0	27	—	—	—	—	—
2007–08	IF Björklöven	Allsv	16	2	3	5	6	—	—	—	—	—
2008–09	Brynäs IF	SEL	55	0	1	1	78	4	0	0	0	4
2009–10	Rockford IceHogs	AHL	19	1	0	1	8	—	—	—	—	—
2009–10	Toledo Walleye	ECHL	27	4	6	10	13	3	0	0	0	0
2010–11	Brynäs IF	SEL	46	4	2	6	12	2	0	0	0	0
2011–12	Brynäs IF	SEL	51	0	1	1	4	9	0	0	0	0
2012–13	Timrå IK	SEL	45	0	5	5	6	—	—	—	—	—
2013–14	Timrå IK	Allsv	49	3	5	8	20	—	—	—	—	—
2014–15	Södertälje SK	Allsv	44	3	3	6	20	—	—	—	—	—
2015–16	Evansville IceMen	ECHL	46	1	4	5	20	—	—	—	—	—
2015–16	Rockford IceHogs	AHL	25	2	7	9	6	2	1	0	1	0
2016–17	Indy Fuel	ECHL	42	2	11	13	6	—	—	—	—	—
2016–17	Rockford IceHogs	AHL	2	0	0	0	2	—	—	—	—	—
AHL totals			46	3	7	10	16	2	1	0	1	0

Medal record

Representing Sweden

Ice hockey

World Junior Championships
Silver medal – second place	2008 Pardubice	

=== International ===
Year	Team	Event	Result	GP	G	A	Pts	PIM
2008	Sweden	WJC	2nd place, silver medalist(s)	6	1	1	2	2
Junior totals				6	1	1	2	2
