= Nico Aaltonen =

Finnish ice hockey player

- Born: June 15, 1988 (age 37) Lappeenranta, Finland
- Height: 5 ft 10 in (178 cm)
- Weight: 181 lb (82 kg; 12 st 13 lb)
- Position: Left wing
- Shot: Left
- Played for: Lukko Rauma; Porin Ässät; HPK; Espoo Blues; Arlan Kokshetau
- Playing career: 2006–2016

Nico Aaltonen (born June 15, 1988) is a Finnish former professional ice hockey player. He played in the SM-liiga with Lukko, Ässät, HPK and Espoo Blues.

== Playing career ==
Aaltonen joined Espoo Blues on a try-out contract on August 1, 2014 which was followed by him joining Arlan Kokshetau in 2015. The same year, he joined the Manchester Phoenix of the English Premier Ice Hockey League.

== Career statistics ==
=== Regular season and playoffs ===
			Regular season					Playoffs
Season	Team	League	GP	G	A	Pts	PIM	GP	G	A	Pts	PIM
2006–07	Lukko	SM-l	8	0	0	0	0	3	0	0	0	0
2007–08	Lukko	SM-l	8	1	0	1	0	—	—	—	—	—
2007–08	Hokki	Mestis	4	1	3	4	2	—	—	—	—	—
2007–08	Mikkelin Jukurit	Mestis	6	3	1	4	2	—	—	—	—	—
2008–09	Lukko	SM-l	40	5	1	6	4	—	—	—	—	—
2008–09	Hokki	Mestis	5	4	0	4	0	—	—	—	—	—
2009–10	Lukko	SM-l	35	3	5	8	14	3	0	0	0	0
2010–11	Lukko	SM-liiga	22	1	4	5	31	10	0	0	0	0
2010–11	Hokki	Mestis	14	1	8	9	16	—	—	—	—	—
2010–11	LeKi	Mestis	6	2	2	4	0	—	—	—	—	—
2011–12	Ässät	SM-l	33	4	5	9	6	4	0	0	0	4
2011–12	HPK	SM-l	8	2	2	4	0	—	—	—	—	—
2012–13	Ässät	SM-l	35	2	5	7	8	16	1	2	3	4
2013–14	Sport	Mestis	28	2	8	10	6	7	0	1	1	2
Liiga totals			189	18	22	40	63	39	2	3	5	8

=== International ===
Year	Team	Event	Result	GP	G	A	Pts	PIM
2005	Finland	WHC17	6th	5	1	1	2	2
2006	Finland	WJC18	2nd place, silver medalist(s)	5	0	1	1	4
2007	Finland	WJC	6th	5	0	0	0	0
2008	Finland	WJC	6th	6	3	1	4	0
Junior totals				21	4	3	7	6
