= Mikkel Bødker =

Danish ice hockey player (born 1989)

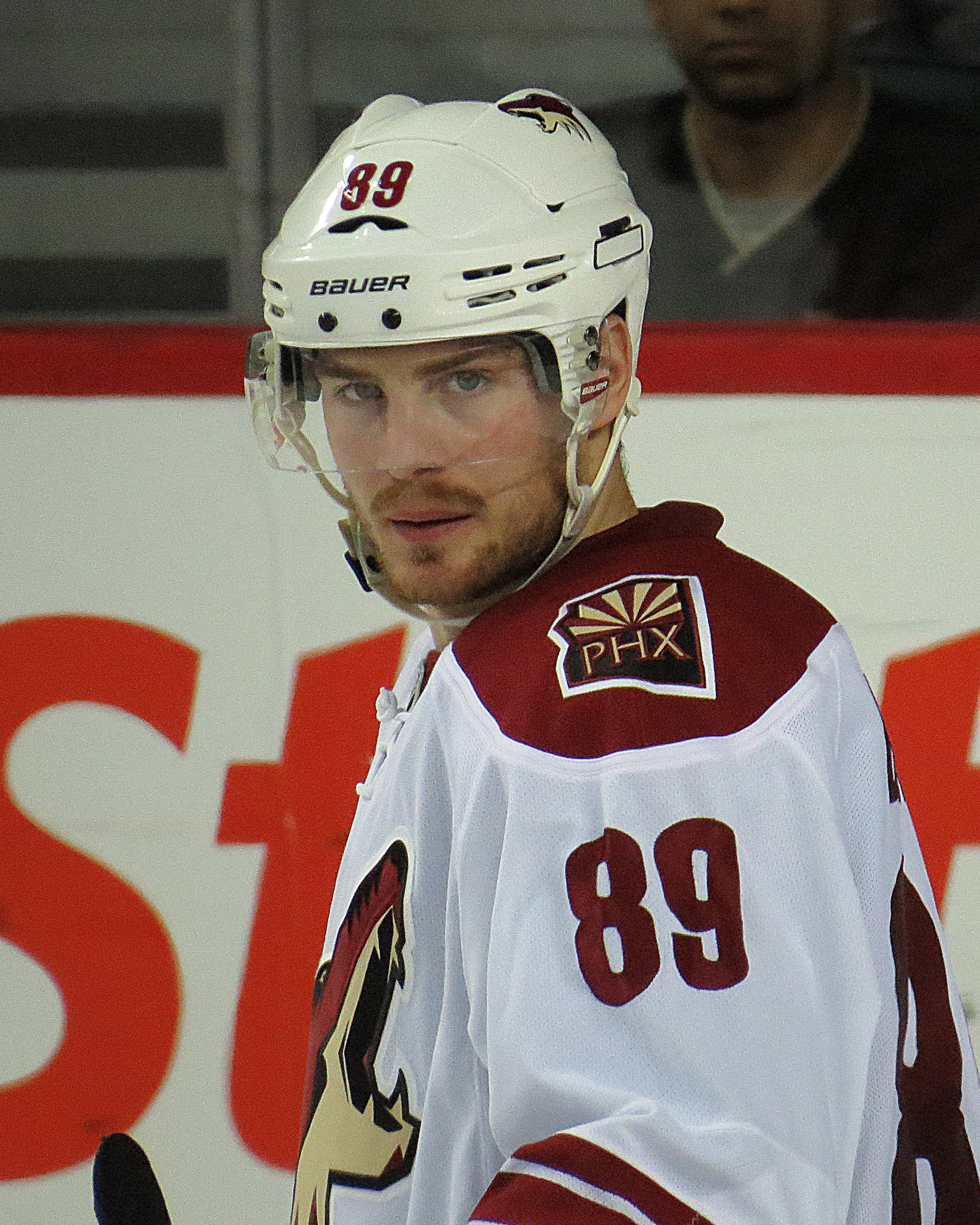
- Bødker with the Phoenix Coyotes in 2014
- Born: 16 December 1989 (age 36) Brøndby, Denmark
- Height: 6 ft 0 in (183 cm)
- Weight: 210 lb (95 kg; 15 st 0 lb)
- Position: Right wing
- Shot: Left
- Played for: Frölunda HC; Arizona Coyotes; Lukko; Colorado Avalanche; San Jose Sharks; Ottawa Senators; HC Lugano; HV71
- National team: Denmark
- NHL draft: 8th overall, 2008; Phoenix Coyotes
- Playing career: 2006–2023

Mikkel Bødker (surname alternately spelled Boedker; born 16 December 1989) is a Danish former professional ice hockey right winger. He was selected eighth overall by the Phoenix Coyotes in the 2008 NHL entry draft, making him the highest-ever drafted Danish player. He also featured on the cover of the video game NHL 10 in Denmark and Norway.

== Playing career ==
Bødker was brought up in the highly regarded youth hockey program of Rødovre SIK. In 2005, at the age of 15, he moved to Frölunda HC in Sweden, where he played on Frölunda's junior team. He had an impressive 2006–07 season with 49 points (19 goals and 30 assists) in 39 games. The team won the national junior championships, and Bødker also made his debut with the men's team in the Swedish Elite League.

After the season, Bødker was drafted by the Kitchener Rangers in the 2007 Canadian Hockey League (CHL) Import Draft, and he joined the team for the 2007–08 season. He had a successful first season in the Ontario Hockey League (OHL), where he played on the Rangers' second line. He scored 29 goals and 44 assists for a total of 73 points in 62 regular season games. He enjoyed even more success in the playoffs, with 35 points in 20 games en route to helping the Rangers win the OHL playoff championship. In the Memorial Cup, he had six points in five games as the Rangers finished runner-up, losing in the finals to the Western Hockey League (WHL)'s Spokane Chiefs.

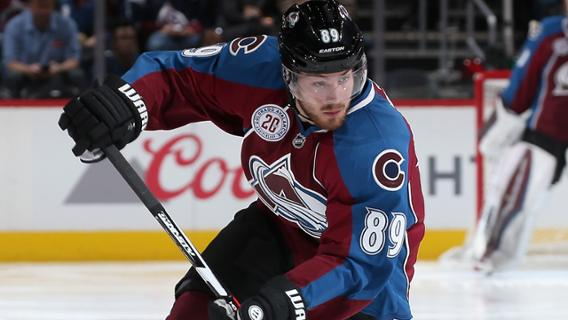
Bødker pictured during his time with the Colorado Avalanche

Bødker was selected 8th overall by the National Hockey League (NHL)'s Arizona Coyotes in the first round of the 2008 NHL entry draft. He made his Coyotes debut in the 2008–09 season and scored his first NHL goal on 12 October 2008, against Jean-Sébastien Giguère of the Anaheim Ducks. Bødker also played in the NHL YoungStars Game in 2009 at the year's All-Star weekend festivities in Montreal, Quebec.

In the 2012 Stanley Cup playoffs, Bødker had an impressive showing, scoring two straight overtime-winning goals in Games 3 and 4 of the first-round series against the Chicago Blackhawks. The Coyotes would go on to a franchise-record-setting playoff run to the Western Conference Finals, where the team ultimately lost to the eventual Stanley Cup champion Los Angeles Kings in five games. Bødker scored four goals and four assists during the Coyotes' playoff run. Due to the 2012–13 NHL lockout, Bødker went overseas to find work and signed with Rauman Lukko of the Finnish League.

In the following lockout-shortened 2012–13 season, Bødker had seven goals and 26 points. A restricted free agent following the season's end, Bødker signed a two-year agreement to keep him in Arizona. In the first year of his new contract, the 2013–14 season, he established career-highs in goals, assists and points (19, 32, and 51 respectively) in 82 games. On 15 October 2014, Bødker scored his first career NHL hat-trick against the Edmonton Oilers to lead the Coyotes to a 7–4 victory. He finished the season with 14 goals and 28 points in 45 games before undergoing surgery to have his spleen removed that ended his season.

Following the 2014–15 NHL season, Bødker became a restricted free agent under the NHL Collective Bargaining Agreement. The Arizona Coyotes made him a qualifying offer to retain his NHL rights and, on 5 July 2015, Bødker filed for salary arbitration. However, on 7 July 2015, the Coyotes and Bødker reached a one-year agreement that avoided going to arbitration.

In the 2015–16 season, Bødker became the first player in franchise history to record two hat tricks in one season against the same team, Bødker's target being the Ottawa Senators. His first came against the Senators in Ottawa on 24 October 2015 in a 4–1 win, ending the Coyotes four-game winless streak. His second hat trick against the Senators came on 28 November 2015 in Arizona in a 4–3 win. A possible free agent in the offseason, on 29 February 2016, Bødker was traded to the Colorado Avalanche in exchange for Alex Tanguay, Conner Bleackley and prospect Kyle Wood, to assist the Avalanche in their playoff pursuit. At the time of the trade, Bødker was fifth in team goals with 13 and third in points with 39. Ultimately though, Colorado would not qualify for the postseason. He added four goals and 12 points with the Avalanche.

With the Avalanche unable to come to terms with Bødker, he left as an unrestricted free agent in the off-season, signing a four-year $16 million contract with Stanley Cup finalists, the San Jose Sharks on 1 July 2016. In the following season Bødker scored a hat trick in a 5–3 over the Edmonton Oilers on 10 January 2017. In the 2017–18 season he had a two-goal game that helped the Sharks beat the Dallas Stars on 18 February 2018. On 8 March he scored the Sharks first power play goal in two months in a 2–0 win over the St. Louis Blues.

On 19 June 2018, he was traded by the Sharks alongside Julius Bergman and a sixth-round pick of the 2020 NHL entry draft to the Ottawa Senators in exchange for Mike Hoffman, Cody Donaghey and a fifth-round pick in the 2020 Draft. Bødker saw reduced use in Ottawa. In the 2019–20 season, his final season with the Senators, he appeared in only 20 games before the season ended early due to the COVID-19 pandemic.

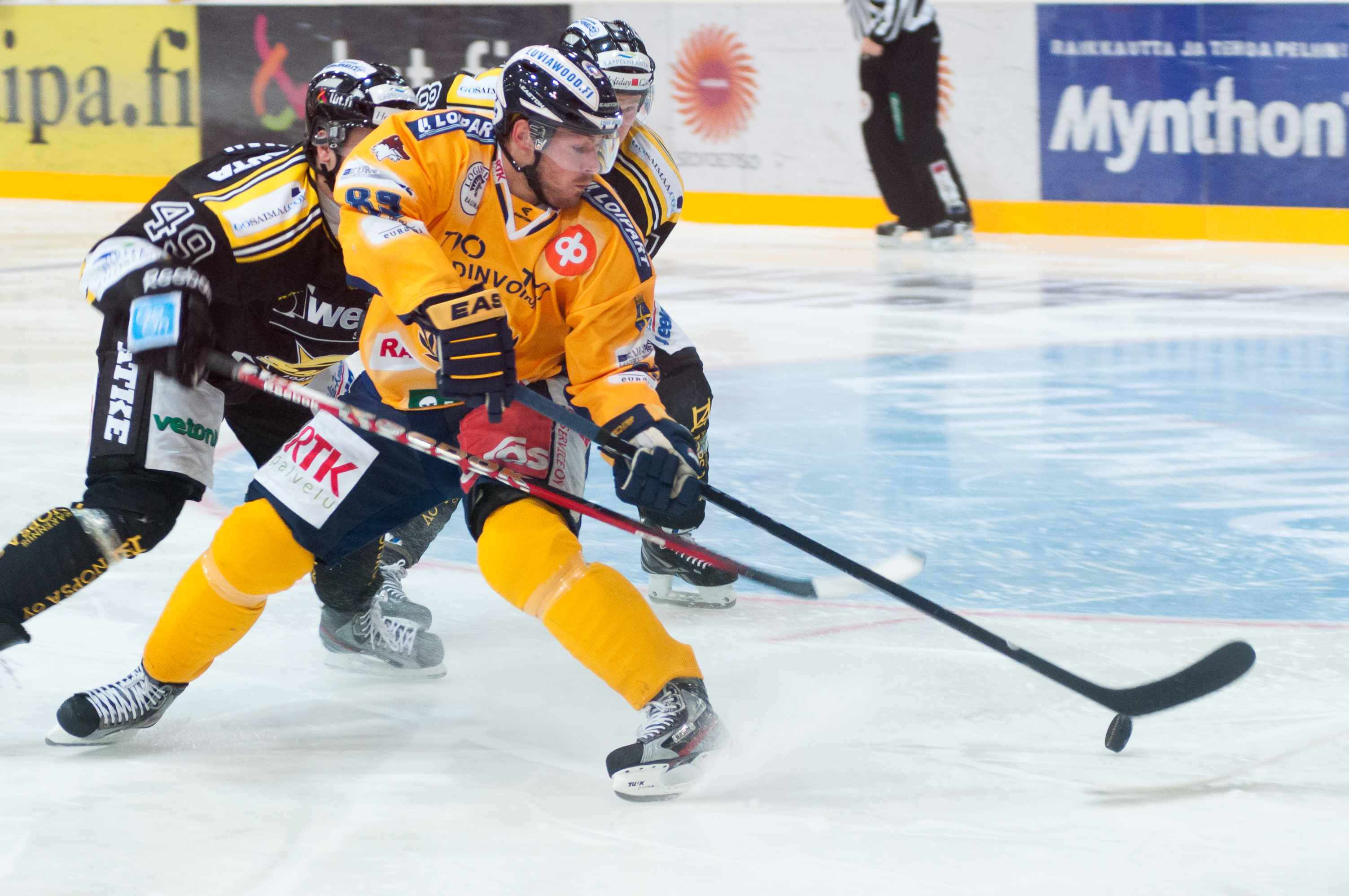
Bødker playing for Lukko in 2012

On 19 May 2020, Bødker agreed to a two-year deal with HC Lugano of the National League (NL), beginning in the 2020–21 season. He then signed a one-year contract with HV71 of the Swedish Hockey League (SHL), as announced by the club on 26 June 2022. Bødker announced his retirement from professional ice hockey on 23 May 2023.

== International play ==
Bødker's older brother Mads is a former defenceman with SønderjyskE Ishockey in the Danish league Metal Ligaen and a regular player with the Danish national team. The two brothers teamed up on the Danish junior national team at the 2007 Division I World Junior Championships and helped Denmark gain promotion to the top division for the first time. Playing against opponents up to two years older, Mikkel Bødker scored one goal in five games.

Bødker again played for Denmark at the 2008 World Junior Ice Hockey Championships. He finished second in team scoring behind Lars Eller, notching two goals and four assists in six games.

== Career statistics ==
=== Regular season and playoffs ===
			Regular season					Playoffs
Season	Team	League	GP	G	A	Pts	PIM	GP	G	A	Pts	PIM
2004–05	Rødovre SIK	DNK.2	1	0	1	1	0	—	—	—	—	—
2005–06	Frölunda HC	J18 Allsv	5	2	0	2	0	2	0	1	1	0
2005–06	Frölunda HC	J20	37	9	8	17	22	2	1	2	3	0
2006–07	Frölunda HC	J18 Allsv	3	3	2	5	2	6	5	4	9	2
2006–07	Frölunda HC	J20	39	19	30	49	14	8	6	5	11	6
2006–07	Frölunda HC	SEL	2	0	0	0	0	—	—	—	—	—
2007–08	Kitchener Rangers	OHL	62	29	44	73	14	20	9	26	35	2
2008–09	Phoenix Coyotes	NHL	78	11	17	28	18	—	—	—	—	—
2009–10	Phoenix Coyotes	NHL	14	1	2	3	0	—	—	—	—	—
2009–10	San Antonio Rampage	AHL	64	11	27	38	4	—	—	—	—	—
2010–11	San Antonio Rampage	AHL	36	12	22	34	8	—	—	—	—	—
2010–11	Phoenix Coyotes	NHL	34	4	10	14	8	4	0	1	1	2
2011–12	Phoenix Coyotes	NHL	82	11	13	24	12	16	4	4	8	0
2012–13	Lukko	SM-l	29	21	12	33	10	—	—	—	—	—
2012–13	Phoenix Coyotes	NHL	48	7	19	26	12	—	—	—	—	—
2013–14	Phoenix Coyotes	NHL	82	19	32	51	20	—	—	—	—	—
2014–15	Arizona Coyotes	NHL	45	14	14	28	6	—	—	—	—	—
2015–16	Arizona Coyotes	NHL	62	13	26	39	10	—	—	—	—	—
2015–16	Colorado Avalanche	NHL	18	4	8	12	2	—	—	—	—	—
2016–17	San Jose Sharks	NHL	81	10	16	26	10	4	1	1	2	2
2017–18	San Jose Sharks	NHL	74	15	22	37	12	10	1	5	6	6
2018–19	Ottawa Senators	NHL	71	7	28	35	6	—	—	—	—	—
2019–20	Ottawa Senators	NHL	20	2	2	4	0	—	—	—	—	—
2020–21	HC Lugano	NL	51	18	17	35	18	4	0	0	0	4
2021–22	HC Lugano	NL	44	4	20	24	8	—	—	—	—	—
2022–23	HV71	SHL	41	5	6	11	8	—	—	—	—	—
NHL totals			709	118	209	327	116	34	6	11	17	10

=== International ===
Year	Team	Event	Result	GP	G	A	Pts	PIM
2005	Denmark	WJC18	10th	6	1	1	2	6
2006	Denmark	WJC D1	14th	5	1	3	4	2
2006	Denmark	WJC18 D1	13th	5	2	2	4	4
2007	Denmark	WJC D1	11th	5	1	0	1	14
2007	Denmark	WJC18 D1	11th	5	4	7	11	4
2008	Denmark	WJC	10th	6	2	4	6	2
2009	Denmark	WC	13th	6	3	1	4	4
2011	Denmark	WC	11th	6	3	1	4	2
2013	Denmark	WC	12th	7	0	3	3	0
2014	Denmark	WC	13th	7	2	2	4	2
2016	Denmark	OGQ	DNQ	3	1	1	2	4
2016	Team Europe	WCH	2nd	2	0	0	0	0
2018	Denmark	WC	10th	4	0	4	4	2
2019	Denmark	WC	11th	7	1	4	5	2
2021	Denmark	WC	12th	3	0	4	4	0
2021	Denmark	OGQ	Q	3	0	0	0	0
2022	Denmark	OG	7th	5	1	1	2	0
2023	Denmark	WC	10th	7	1	0	1	0
Junior totals				26	9	13	22	30
Senior totals				60	12	21	33	16

Awards and achievements
Preceded by Nick Ross	Phoenix Coyotes first-round draft pick 2008	Succeeded by Viktor Tikhonov
