= Maxim Mamin (ice hockey, born 1988) =

Russian ice hockey player

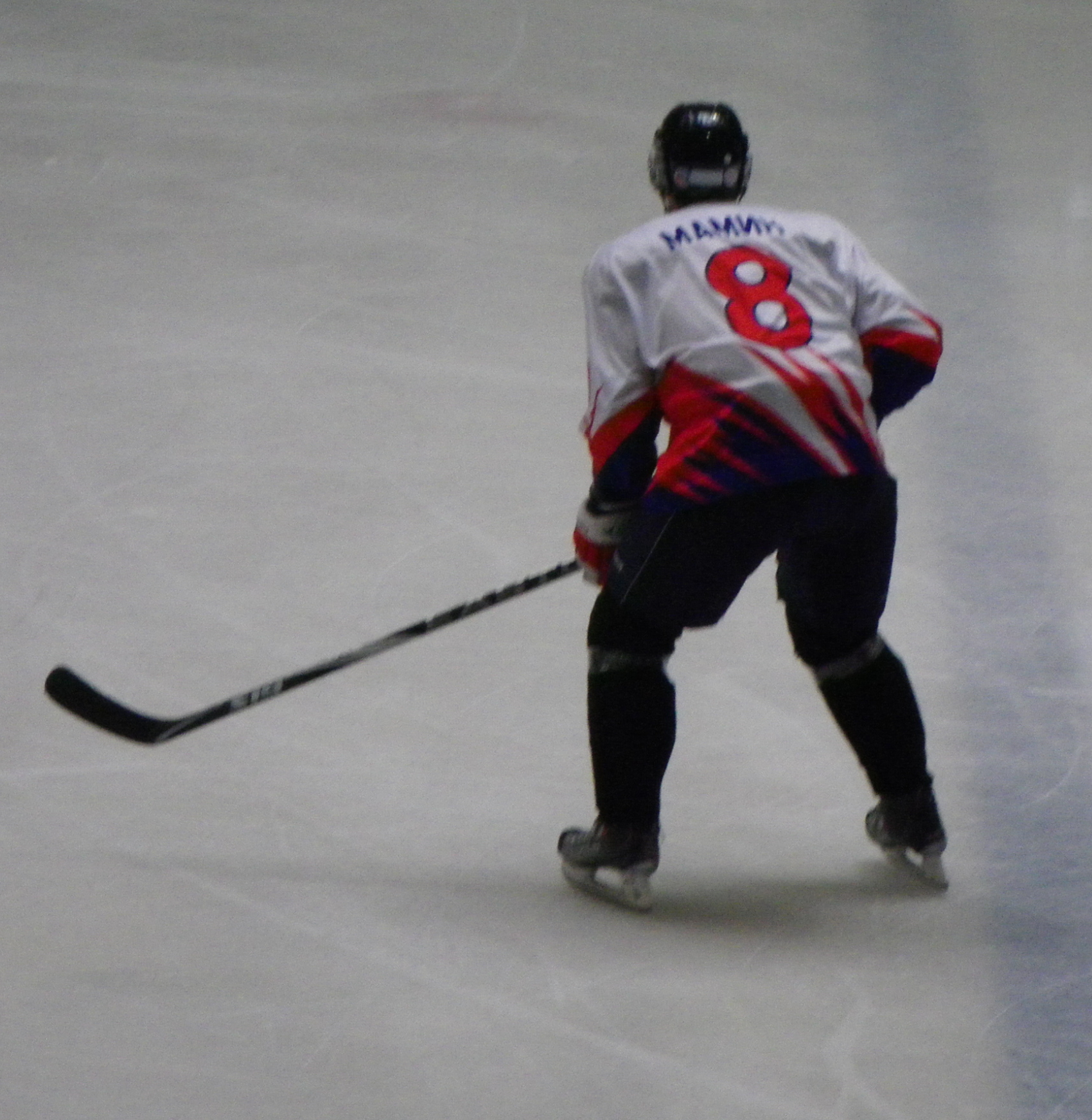
- Mamin in 2010
- Born: 17 May 1988 (age 38) Marneuli, Georgian SSR, Soviet Union
- Height: 6 ft 0 in (183 cm)
- Weight: 198 lb (90 kg; 14 st 2 lb)
- Position: Centre
- Shot: Left
- Played for: Metallurg Magnitogorsk; Salavat Yulaev Ufa; Traktor Chelyabinsk; HC Vityaz; Admiral Vladivostok; Gornyak Rudny
- Playing career: 2006–2018

Maxim Eduardovich Mamin (Russian: Максим Эдуардович Мамин; born 17 May 1988) is a Russian former professional ice hockey centre.

In June 2008, after failing a drug test at the 2008 World Junior Ice Hockey Championships, the International Ice Hockey Federation (IIHF) suspended Mamin for two years.

== Career statistics ==
			Regular season					Playoffs
Season	Team	League	GP	G	A	Pts	PIM	GP	G	A	Pts	PIM
2004–05	Metallurg Magnitogorsk-2	Russia3	37	4	10	14	32	—	—	—	—	—
2005–06	Metallurg Magnitogorsk-2	Russia3	42	13	13	26	62	—	—	—	—	—
2006–07	Metallurg Magnitogorsk	Russia	12	1	2	3	2	7	0	1	1	0
2006–07	Metallurg Magnitogorsk-2	Russia3	40	12	22	34	52	—	—	—	—	—
2007–08	Metallurg Magnitogorsk	Russia	21	0	2	2	6	6	1	0	1	2
2007–08	Metallurg Magnitogorsk-2	Russia3	7	1	7	8	4	—	—	—	—	—
2009–10	Stalnye Lisy Magnitogorsk	MHL	12	4	4	8	38	15	5	4	9	22
2010–11	Metallurg Magnitogorsk	KHL	36	2	3	5	24	—	—	—	—	—
2011–12	Salavat Yulaev Ufa	KHL	3	0	0	0	0	—	—	—	—	—
2011–12	Traktor Chelyabinsk	KHL	32	0	3	3	21	15	0	0	0	6
2013–14	HC Vityaz Podolsk	KHL	32	1	2	3	18	—	—	—	—	—
2013–14	Titan Klin	VHL	11	1	2	3	10	—	—	—	—	—
2014–15	HC Vityaz Podolsk	KHL	26	5	1	6	21	—	—	—	—	—
2014–15	THK Tver	VHL	5	0	1	1	25	—	—	—	—	—
2015–16	Admiral Vladivostok	KHL	37	3	5	8	78	3	0	0	0	27
2016–17	Admiral Vladivostok	KHL	33	1	1	2	16	—	—	—	—	—
2017–18	Gornyak Rudny	Kazakhstan	20	2	4	6	39	4	0	0	0	2
KHL totals			199	12	15	27	178	18	0	0	0	33
