= Eric Moe (ice hockey) =

Swedish ice hockey player

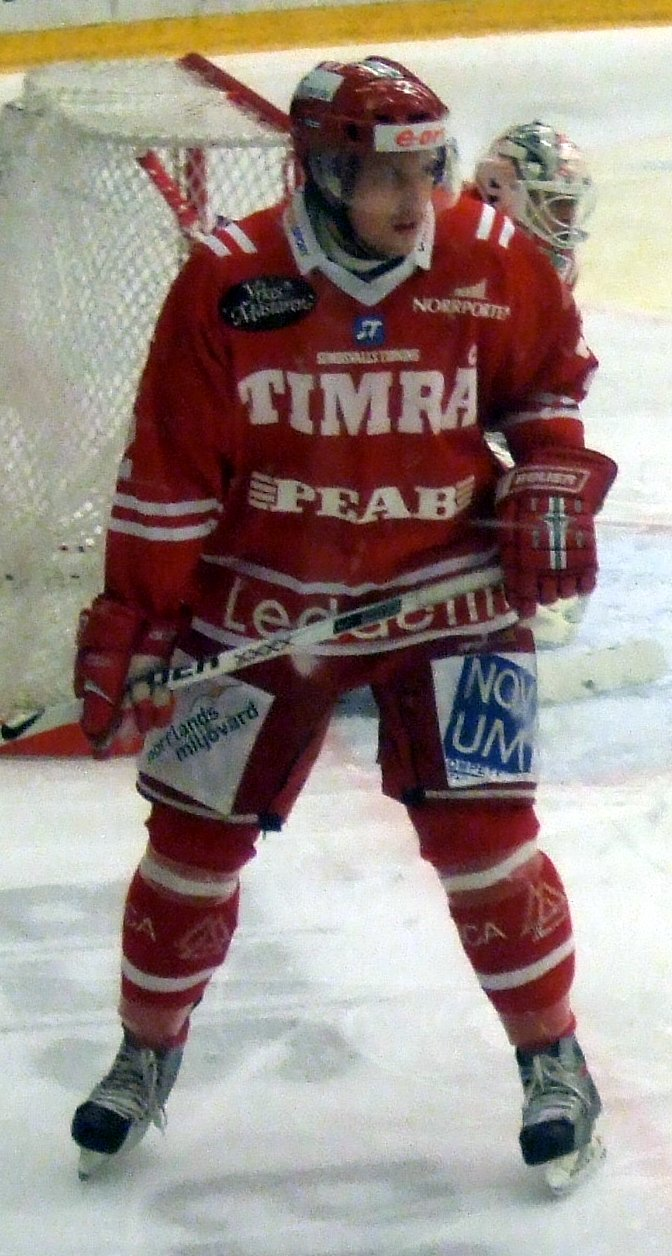
- Born: March 6, 1988 (age 37); Timrå, SWE
- Height: 5 ft 11 in (180 cm)
- Weight: 182 lb (83 kg; 13 st 0 lb)
- Position: Defence
- Shoots: Right
- HA team: Leksands IF
- Playing career: 2006–present

Eric Moe (born March 6, 1988, in Timrå, Sweden) is a defenceman playing for Leksands IF hockey team in the Swedish second league, HockeyAllsvenskan.

== Career statistics ==
			Regular season					Playoffs
Season	Team	League	GP	G	A	Pts	PIM	GP	G	A	Pts	PIM
2005–06	Timrå IK	SEL	2	0	0	0	0	--	--	--	--	--
2006–07	Timrå IK	SEL	44	0	1	1	12	6	0	0	0	0
2007–08	Timrå IK	SEL	19	0	4	4	4	10	0	0	0	4
2008–09	Timrå IK	SEL	42	5	19	24	20	5	0	1	1	0
2009–10	Timrå IK	SEL	43	0	11	11	16	5	0	0	0	2
2010–11	Leksands IF	HA	34	3	6	9	12	6	0	0	0	0
2010–11	Sundsvall Hockey (on loan)	HA	40	6	6	12	22	6	0	5	5	2
2010–11	Modo Hockey (on loan)	SEL	2	0	0	0	0	-	-	-	-	-

== International play ==
Played for Sweden in:

- 2006 World U18 Championships
- 2008 World Junior Championships (silver medal)

=== International statistics ===
Year	Team	Comp	GP	G	A	Pts	PIM
2006	Sweden	U18	6	1	2	3	0
2008	Sweden	WJC	6	1	3	4	0
