= Antonín Bořuta =

Czech ice hockey player

- Born: 26 October 1988 (age 36); Gottwaldov, Czechoslovakia
- Height: 6 ft 1 in (185 cm)
- Weight: 176 lb (80 kg; 12 st 8 lb)
- Position: Defence
- Shoots: Left
- EBEL team Former teams: HC TWK Innsbruck; HC Zlín; HC Olomouc; Orli Znojmo
- Playing career: 2007–present

Antonín Bořuta (born 26 October 1988) is a Czech professional ice hockey defenceman currently playing with UK EIHL side Sheffield Steelers, on loan from HC TWK Innsbruck of the Austrian Hockey League (EBEL). He played with HC Zlín in the Czech Extraliga during the 2010–11 Czech Extraliga season.
