= Dmitri Sayustov =

Russian ice hockey player

- Born: February 13, 1988 (age 37); Chelyabinsk, Russian SFSR
- Height: 6 ft 1 in (185 cm)
- Weight: 187 lb (85 kg; 13 st 5 lb)
- Position: Centre
- Shot: Left
- Played for: Torpedo Nizhny Novgorod; CSKA Moscow; Traktor Chelyabinsk; Admiral Vladivostok; Salavat Yulaev Ufa; Sibir Novosibirsk
- Playing career: 2004–2023

Dmitri Sayustov (born February 13, 1988) is a Russian former professional ice hockey centre who played with Torpedo Nizhny Novgorod, HC CSKA Moscow, Traktor Chelyabinsk, Admiral Vladivostok, Salavat Yulaev Ufa and HC Sibir Novosibirsk in the Kontinental Hockey League (KHL).

== Career statistics ==
			Regular season					Playoffs
Season	Team	League	GP	G	A	Pts	PIM	GP	G	A	Pts	PIM
2004–05	Metallurg Magnitogorsk-2	Russia3	36	1	5	6	10	—	—	—	—	—
2005–06	Metallurg Magnitogorsk-2	Russia3	45	19	14	33	28	—	—	—	—	—
2006–07	Metallurg Magnitogorsk-2	Russia3	64	35	39	74	48	—	—	—	—	—
2007–08	Torpedo Nizhny Novgorod	Russia	40	3	9	12	8	—	—	—	—	—
2008–09	Torpedo Nizhny Novgorod	KHL	27	2	1	3	6	—	—	—	—	—
2008–09	Torpedo Nizhny Novgorod-2	Russia3	3	1	1	2	4	7	0	6	6	4
2009–10	HC CSKA Moscow	KHL	52	4	1	5	12	—	—	—	—	—
2010–11	HC CSKA Moscow	KHL	26	0	1	1	6	—	—	—	—	—
2010–11	Traktor Chelyabinsk	KHL	16	0	4	4	16	—	—	—	—	—
2011–12	Traktor Chelyabinsk	KHL	20	3	2	5	4	8	0	0	0	0
2012–13	Traktor Chelyabinsk	KHL	12	0	0	0	2	—	—	—	—	—
2012–13	Chelmet Chelyabinsk	VHL	5	2	2	4	2	—	—	—	—	—
2013–14	Traktor Chelyabinsk	KHL	12	1	1	2	2	—	—	—	—	—
2013–14	Chelmet Chelyabinsk	VHL	27	8	9	17	36	—	—	—	—	—
2014–15	Traktor Chelyabinsk	KHL	10	0	1	1	2	—	—	—	—	—
2014–15	Chelmet Chelyabinsk	VHL	35	10	8	18	44	6	1	2	3	6
2015–16	Admiral Vladivostok	KHL	57	10	9	19	18	4	0	0	0	27
2016–17	Admiral Vladivostok	KHL	44	12	9	21	32	2	0	0	0	0
2017–18	Admiral Vladivostok	KHL	30	12	5	17	37	—	—	—	—	—
2017–18	Salavat Yulaev Ufa	KHL	10	1	1	2	0	8	0	1	1	4
2018–19	HC Sibir Novosibirsk	KHL	54	12	19	31	16	—	—	—	—	—
2019–20	HC Sibir Novosibirsk	KHL	56	7	4	11	22	5	1	0	1	0
2020–21	HC Sibir Novosibirsk	KHL	51	11	3	14	24	—	—	—	—	—
2021–22	Admiral Vladivostok	KHL	40	7	3	10	16	—	—	—	—	—
2022–23	Admiral Vladivostok	KHL	41	3	4	7	6	—	—	—	—	—
KHL totals			558	85	68	153	221	27	1	1	2	31
