= Anton Korolyov =

Russian ice hockey player

- Born: 26 January 1988 (age 38) Moscow, Russian SFSR, Soviet Union
- Height: 6 ft 0 in (183 cm)
- Weight: 183 lb (83 kg; 13 st 1 lb)
- Position: Right wing
- Shoots: Left
- KHL team Former teams: Free Agent; SKA Saint Petersburg; HC Vityaz; HC Yugra; Admiral Vladivostok
- Playing career: 2007–present

Anton Sergeyevich Korolyov (Russian: Антон Сергеевич Королёв; born 26 January 1988) is a Russian professional ice hockey player. He is currently an unrestricted free agent who was most recently under contract with Admiral Vladivostok of the Kontinental Hockey League (KHL).

Korolyov played with HC Vityaz Podolsk of the KHL during the 2012–13 season.
