= Radek Meidl =

Czech ice hockey player

- Born: November 25, 1988 (age 37) Prostějov, Czechoslovakia
- Height: 6 ft 3 in (191 cm)
- Weight: 194 lb (88 kg; 13 st 12 lb)
- Position: Forward
- Shoots: Left
- NIHL team Former teams: Leeds Chiefs; TMH Polonia Bytom; HC Oceláři Třinec; HK Dukla Trenčín; Orlik Opole; Milton Keynes Lightning
- Playing career: 2006–present

Radek Meidl (born November 25, 1988) is a Czech professional ice hockey player. He is currently playing for Leeds Chiefs of the National Ice Hockey League (NIHL).

Meidl made his Czech Extraliga debut playing with HC Oceláři Třinec during the 2015-16 Czech Extraliga season.

He is the younger brother of Václav Meidl.
