= Petr Strapáč =

Czech ice hockey player

- Born: October 11, 1989 (age 35); Ostrava, Czechoslovakia
- Height: 6 ft 0 in (183 cm)
- Weight: 183 lb (83 kg; 13 st 1 lb)
- Position: Forward
- Shoots: left
- Czech Extraliga team: HC Vítkovice
- Playing career: 2007–present

Petr Strapáč (born October 11, 1989) is a Czech professional ice hockey player. He played with HC Vítkovice in the Czech Extraliga during the 2010–11 Czech Extraliga season.
