= Zbyněk Hampl =

Czech ice hockey player

- Born: March 22, 1988 (age 37) Přerov, Czechoslovakia
- Height: 6 ft 2 in (188 cm)
- Weight: 185 lb (84 kg; 13 st 3 lb)
- Position: Left wing
- Shot: Left
- Played for: HC Oceláři Třinec
- Playing career: 2007–2019

Zbyněk Hampl (born March 22, 1988) is a Czech former professional ice hockey left winger. He played with HC Oceláři Třinec in the Czech Extraliga during the 2010–11 Czech Extraliga season.

== Career statistics ==
			Regular season					Playoffs
Season	Team	League	GP	G	A	Pts	PIM	GP	G	A	Pts	PIM
2002–03	HC Minor 2000 Přerov U18	Czech U18	2	0	0	0	2	—	—	—	—	—
2003–04	HC Minor 2000 Přerov U18	Czech U18	55	15	21	36	118	—	—	—	—	—
2004–05	HC Oceláři Třinec U18	Czech U18	42	31	36	67	119	7	3	3	6	12
2004–05	HC Oceláři Třinec U20	Czech U20	8	3	0	3	4	—	—	—	—	—
2005–06	HC Oceláři Třinec U20	Czech U20	43	10	13	23	113	7	1	1	2	8
2006–07	HC Oceláři Třinec U20	Czech U20	42	23	37	60	121	5	4	3	7	4
2006–07	HC Oceláři Třinec	Czech	2	0	0	0	0	—	—	—	—	—
2007–08	HC Oceláři Třinec U20	Czech U20	17	5	19	24	69	3	0	1	1	2
2007–08	HC Oceláři Třinec	Czech	17	2	0	2	10	—	—	—	—	—
2007–08	HK Jestřábi Prostějov	Czech2	7	2	3	5	8	—	—	—	—	—
2008–09	HC Oceláři Třinec	Czech	44	3	2	5	20	—	—	—	—	—
2008–09	HC Havířov Panthers	Czech2	14	3	6	9	16	4	0	0	0	0
2009–10	HC Oceláři Třinec	Czech	34	0	3	3	16	—	—	—	—	—
2009–10	HC Sumperk	Czech2	2	0	0	0	2	—	—	—	—	—
2010–11	HC Oceláři Třinec	Czech	7	0	0	0	2	—	—	—	—	—
2010–11	SK Horácká Slavia Třebíč	Czech2	4	2	0	2	12	—	—	—	—	—
2010–11	HC Slovan Ústečtí Lvi	Czech2	19	3	8	11	69	14	1	2	3	6
2011–12	HC Oceláři Třinec	Czech	15	5	4	9	4	2	1	0	1	0
2011–12	HC Slovan Ústečtí Lvi	Czech2	14	4	4	8	47	3	0	3	3	4
2012–13	HC Oceláři Třinec	Czech	3	0	0	0	0	—	—	—	—	—
2012–13	HC Olomouc	Czech2	43	8	20	28	64	6	1	1	2	28
2013–14	Anglet Hormadi Élite	France2	22	12	23	35	58	3	1	4	5	22
2014–15	Boxers de Bordeaux	France2	23	7	11	18	43	8	3	5	8	8
2015–16	Nice hockey Côte d'Azur	France2	26	13	28	41	68	7	2	1	3	4
2016–17	Nice hockey Côte d'Azur	Ligue Magnus	42	10	24	34	20	—	—	—	—	—
2017–18	Nice hockey Côte d'Azur	Ligue Magnus	42	9	15	24	59	—	—	—	—	—
2018–19	Nice hockey Côte d'Azur	Ligue Magnus	25	2	8	10	34	—	—	—	—	—
Czech totals			122	10	9	19	52	2	1	0	1	0
Czech2 totals			103	22	41	63	218	27	2	6	8	38
Ligue Magnus totals			109	21	47	68	113	—	—	—	—	—
