= Tobias Forsberg =

Swedish ice hockey player

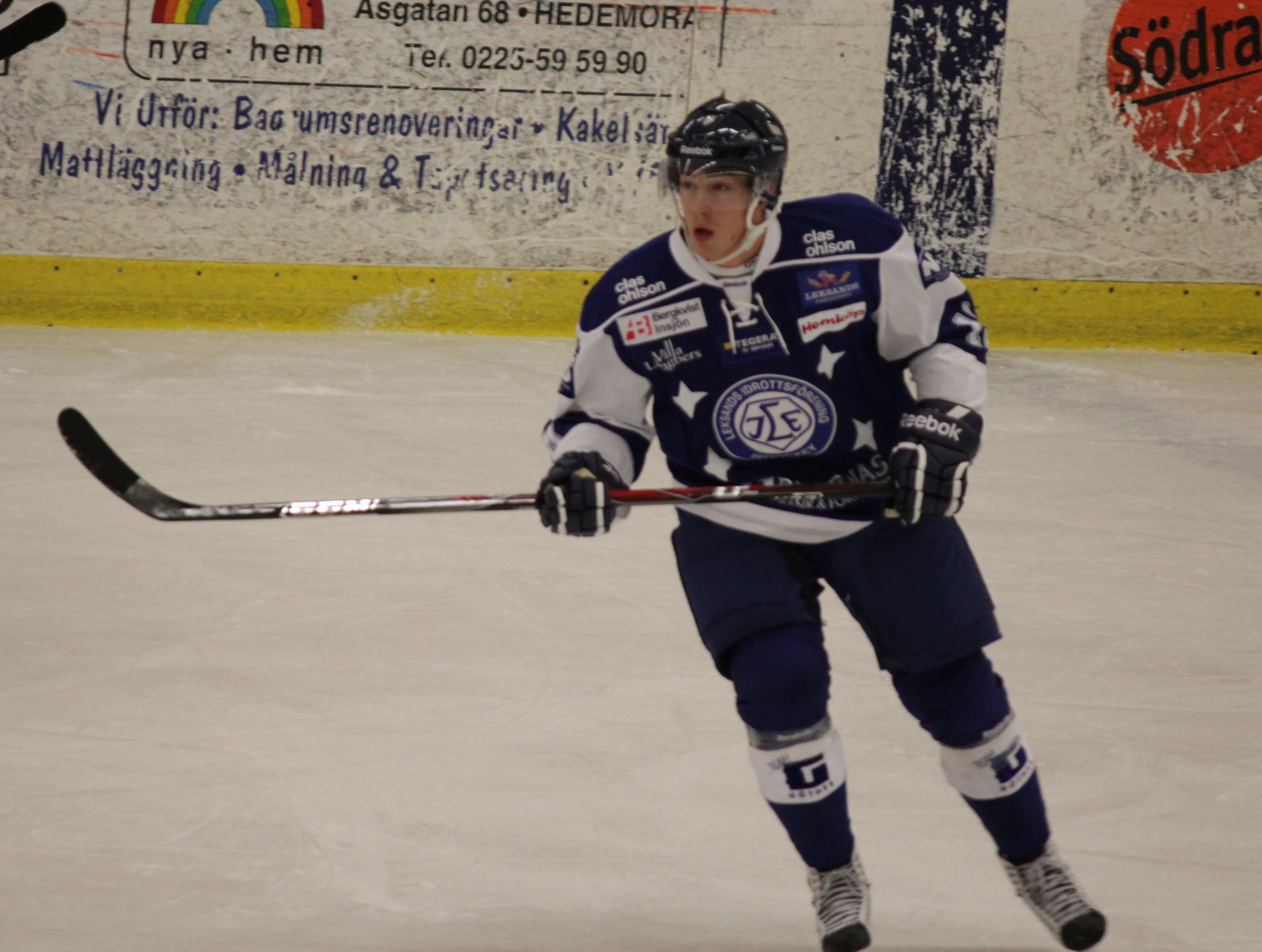
- Born: April 5, 1988 (age 36); Piteå, Sweden
- Height: 6 ft 1 in (185 cm)
- Weight: 192 lb (87 kg; 13 st 10 lb)
- Position: Right wing
- Shot: Right
- Played for: Modo Hockey; Leksands IF
- Playing career: 2007–2019

Hans Tobias Forsberg (born April 5, 1988) is a former professional ice hockey player from Sweden. He played in the Swedish Hockey League (SHL) with Modo Hockey and Leksands IF.

== Playing career ==
Forsberg is the brother of Johan Forsberg. Forsberg joined IF Björklöven on January 30, 2009, from Modo Hockey of the Elitserien and left the team after only four months to sign with VIK Västerås HK on 11 May 2009. Prior to the 2011–12 season he signed with Leksands IF.

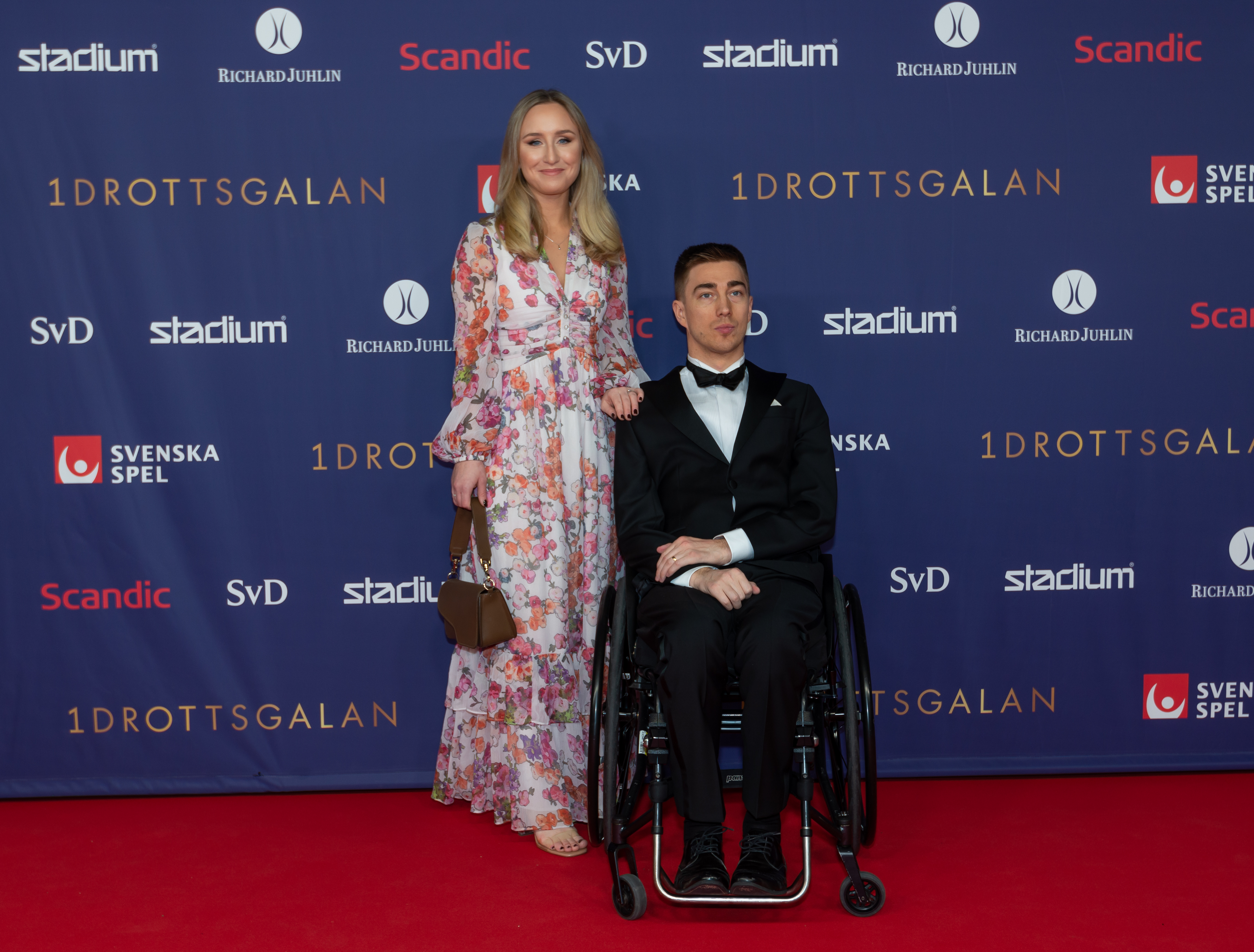
Tobias Forsberg and Filippa Norr Richlow at Swedish Sports Awards 2023.

In the 2018–19 season, while playing with Leksands in the Allsvenskan, Forsberg suffered a career-ending injury in a game against Almtuna IS on December 26, 2018. Crashing into the boards head first, he fractured his neck in multiple places, suffering an injury to his spinal cord. As a result he was paralysed below the chest and has limited function of his arms. With Leksands later regaining promotion to the SHL, the club set up a fund to support Forsberg in his ongoing rehabilitation.
