= Jakub Sklenář (ice hockey) =

Czech ice hockey player

- Born: March 20, 1988 (age 38)
- Height: 5 ft 10 in (178 cm)
- Weight: 168 lb (76 kg; 12 st 0 lb)
- Position: Forward
- Shoots: Left
- Extraliga team: HC Slavia Praha
- NHL draft: Undrafted
- Playing career: 2007–present

Jakub Sklenář (born March 20, 1988) is a Czech professional ice hockey forward who currently plays for HC Slavia Praha of the Czech Extraliga.

Sklenář played previously for HC Havlíčkův Brod.
