= Vadim Golubtsov =

Russian ice hockey player

- Born: January 2, 1988 (age 37)
- KHL team: Metallurg Novokuznetsk
- Playing career: 2003–2017

Vadim Golubtsov (born 1988) is a retired professional ice hockey player who played the 2010–11 season in the Kontinental Hockey League with Metallurg Novokuznetsk.

== Early career ==
Golubtsov began his hockey career in his hometown, playing for the youth team of HK Lipetsk. He quickly advanced through the ranks and began his professional career in the Russian First League with Samara CSK VVS during the 2005-2006 season.

== Professional career ==
Golubtsov's career highlights include playing in the KHL for teams such as Tolyatti Lada and Metallurg Novokuznetsk. His tenure with Tolyatti Lada was particularly notable, where he spent multiple seasons and contributed significantly to the team’s efforts. In the 2009-2010 season, he played 46 games, scoring 7 goals and making 8 assists.

Golubtsov also represented Russia at the international level, including participation in the 2008 World Junior U-20 Championships, where he played 7 games and recorded 3 points.

== Retirement ==
Golubtsov retired from professional ice hockey in 2017. During his career, he played a total of 233 professional games across various leagues, contributing 16 goals and 26 assists. Post-retirement, Golubtsov's contributions to the sport, particularly in the KHL, are remembered by hockey enthusiasts.
