= Evgeny Kurbatov =

Russian ice hockey player

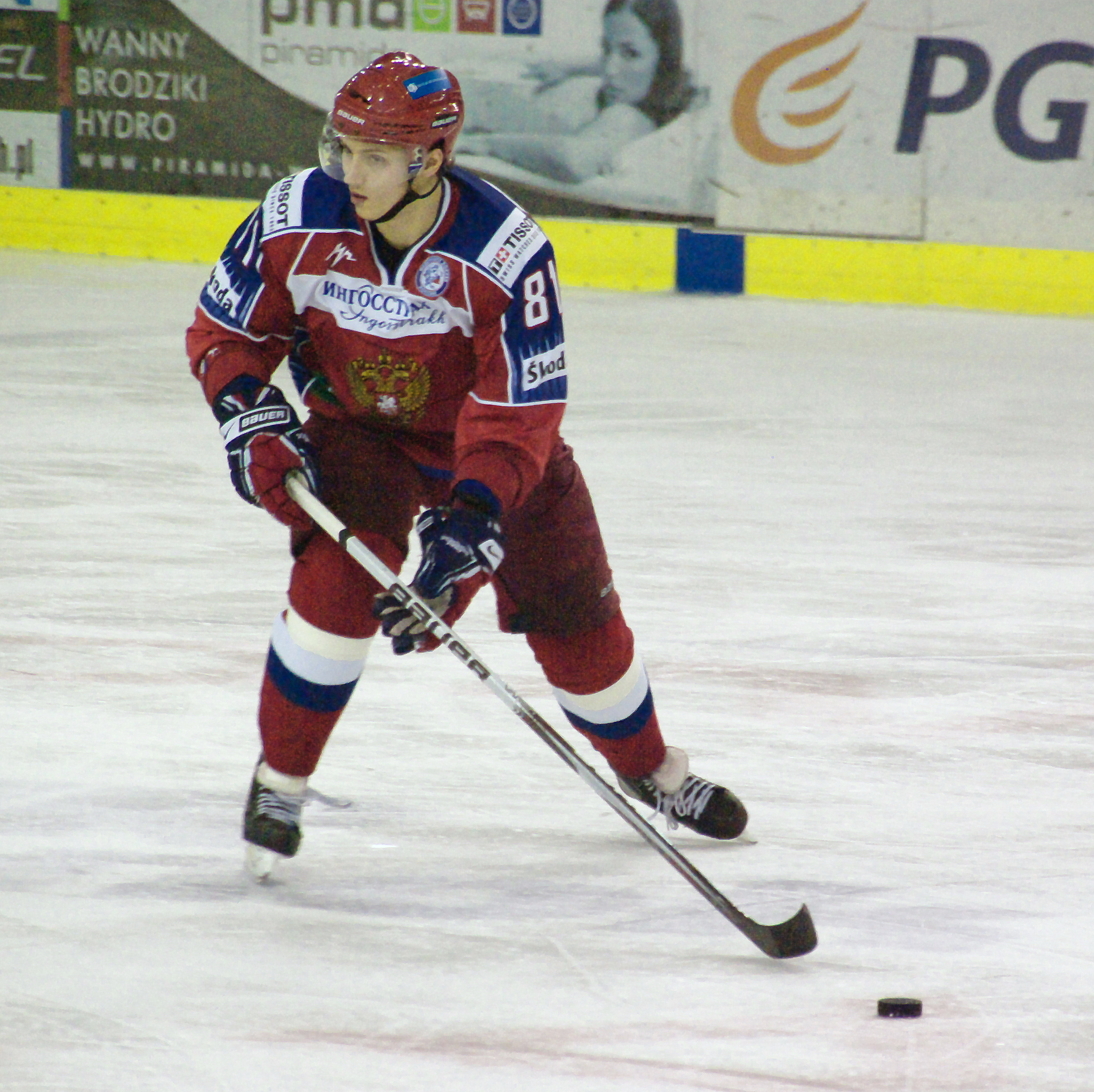
- Born: May 18, 1988 (age 37) Ekaterinburg, Russian SFSR
- Height: 6 ft 0 in (183 cm)
- Weight: 201 lb (91 kg; 14 st 5 lb)
- Position: Defence
- Shoots: Left
- VHL team Former teams: Lada Togliatti; Avangard Omsk; HC CSKA Moscow; Avtomobilist Yekaterinburg; Neftekhimik Nizhnekamsk; Amur Khabarovsk; Torpedo Nizhny Novgorod
- Playing career: 2005–present

Evgeny Kurbatov (born May 18, 1988) is a Russian professional ice hockey defenceman who currently plays for HC Lada Togliatti of the Supreme Hockey League (VHL).
