= Patrik Berglund =

Swedish ice hockey player (born 1988)

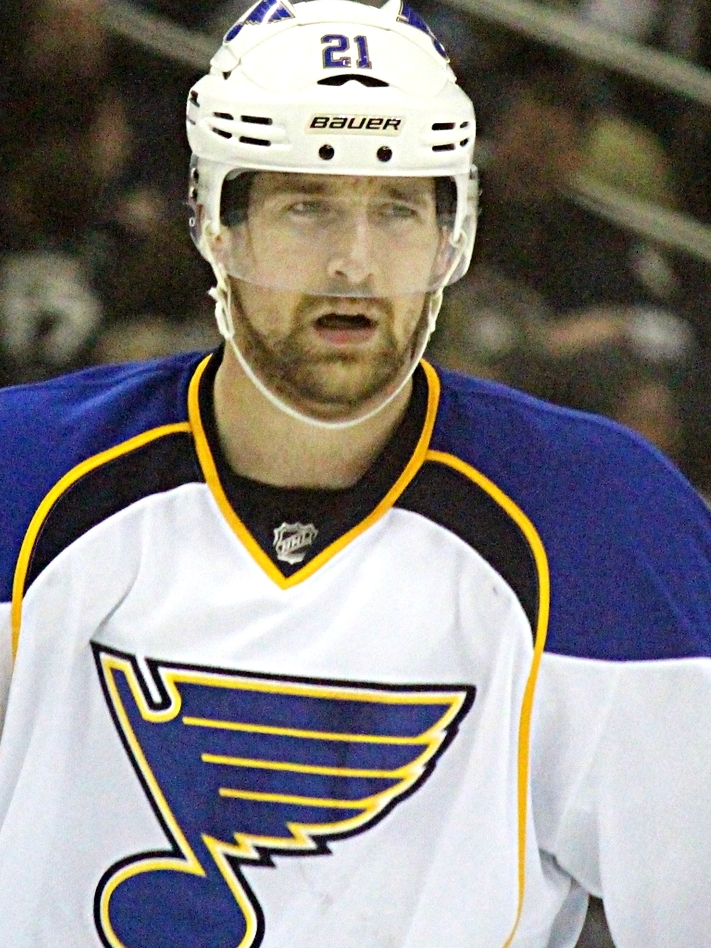
- Berglund with the St. Louis Blues in 2014
- Born: 2 June 1988 (age 38) Västerås, Sweden
- Height: 6 ft 4 in (193 cm)
- Weight: 216 lb (98 kg; 15 st 6 lb)
- Position: Centre
- Shot: Left
- Played for: St. Louis Blues; Buffalo Sabres; Djurgårdens IF; Brynäs IF
- National team: Sweden
- NHL draft: 25th overall, 2006; St. Louis Blues
- Playing career: 2005–2021

Patrik Berglund (born 2 June 1988) is a Swedish former professional ice hockey centre who played in the National Hockey League (NHL) with the St. Louis Blues and Buffalo Sabres. He was drafted 25th overall by the St. Louis Blues in the 2006 NHL entry draft. Internationally, Berglund represented Team Sweden on both the junior and senior levels, including playing on the team that won silver at the 2014 Winter Olympics.

== Playing career ==
In the 2005–06 season, Berglund played for VIK Västerås HK in the HockeyAllsvenskan, the second highest league in Sweden. He was a top prospect in the 2006 NHL entry draft and was drafted 25th overall by the St. Louis Blues.

He scored his first NHL goal on 13 October 2008 against Vesa Toskala of the Toronto Maple Leafs. Paired on a line (called the "Kid Line" by Blues fans, due to the oldest player on the line being 22) with David Perron and his roommate. T. J. Oshie, Berglund became a scoring threat in St. Louis' surprise 2008–09 season, finishing the year with 21 goals and 26 assists for 47 points in 76 games.

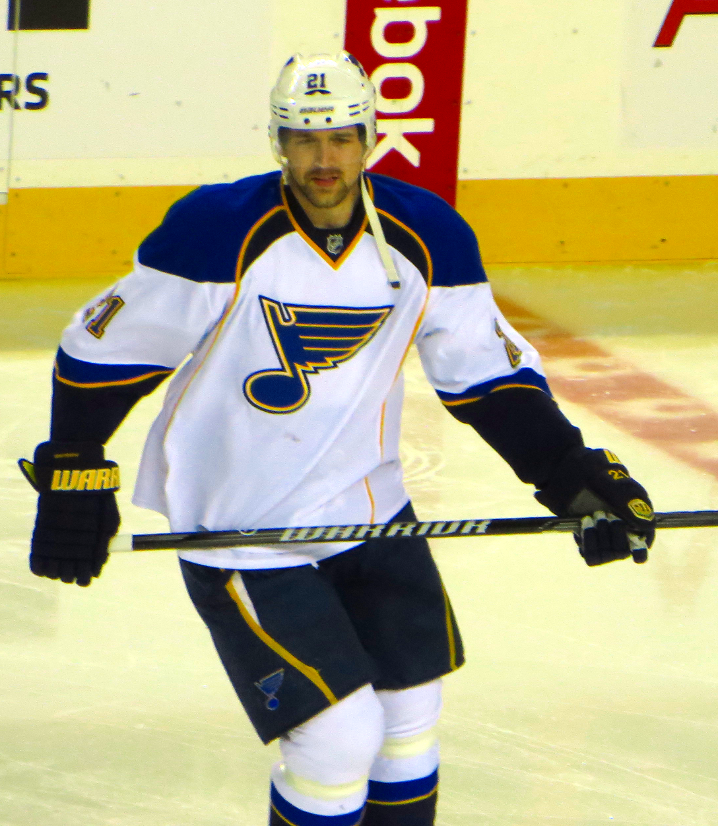
Berglund with the Blues in 2014.

During the 2012–13 NHL lockout, Berglund returned to Sweden to play for VIK Västerås HK.

On 25 June 2013 Berglund signed a one-year $3.25 million contract extension with the Blues. On 26 June 2014, Berglund signed an $11.1 million contract to continue playing with the Blues for 3 more years.

In the midst of the 2016–17 season, Berglund signed a five-year $19.25 million contract extension with the Blues on 24 February 2017.

During the off-season before the 2017–18 season, Berglund was injured while training and was expected to be out of the Blues lineup until December. He was activated off injured reserve on 29 November, and he made his season debut against the Anaheim Ducks that night.

On 1 July 2018, Berglund, along with Tage Thompson, Vladimír Sobotka, a first-round pick in the 2019 NHL entry draft and a second-round pick in the 2021 NHL Entry Draft, were traded by the Blues to the Buffalo Sabres in exchange for Ryan O'Reilly. Berglund could have blocked the trade, but his agent failed to submit paperwork by the deadline.

On 15 December, Berglund was suspended indefinitely by the Sabres for failure to report to the team. At the time of the suspension, Berglund had missed the previous two games with what was said to be an illness, but Sabres' head coach, Phil Housley, commented that "obviously it developed into something different." On 19 December, the Sabres terminated Berglund's contract. Berglund later said in an interview that he was no longer happy playing professional hockey and was taking a hiatus from the game to improve his mental health. At the time of his suspension and subsequent release, Berglund was on track to set career-low offensive statistics with just 2 goals and 4 points in 23 games, and had been made a healthy scratch several times throughout the season.

On 1 July 2019, Berglund returned to resume his professional career in Sweden, agreeing to a one-year contract with Djurgårdens IF of the SHL. In making his long-awaited SHL debut in the 2019–20 season, Berglund regained his offensive touch, registering 17 goals and 31 points in 49 regular season games before the playoffs were cancelled due to the COVID-19 pandemic.

As a free agent and speculation of a return to the NHL, Berglund opted to remain in Sweden, agreeing to a two-year contract with Brynäs IF on 15 July 2020.

== Career statistics ==
=== Regular season and playoffs ===
			Regular season					Playoffs
Season	Team	League	GP	G	A	Pts	PIM	GP	G	A	Pts	PIM
2004–05	Västerås IK Ungdom	J18 Allsv	5	2	1	3	4	3	0	1	1	6
2004–05	Västerås IK Ungdom	J20	25	5	5	10	14	—	—	—	—	—
2005–06	VIK Västerås HK	J20	27	17	12	29	38	—	—	—	—	—
2005–06	VIK Västerås HK	Allsv	21	3	1	4	4	—	—	—	—	—
2006–07	VIK Västerås HK	Allsv	35	21	27	48	30	1	0	0	0	2
2006–07	VIK Västerås HK	J20	—	—	—	—	—	5	4	5	9	6
2007–08	VIK Västerås HK	Allsv	36	21	24	45	18	15	2	10	12	14
2008–09	St. Louis Blues	NHL	76	21	26	47	16	4	0	0	0	2
2009–10	St. Louis Blues	NHL	71	13	13	26	16	—	—	—	—	—
2010–11	St. Louis Blues	NHL	81	22	30	52	26	—	—	—	—	—
2011–12	St. Louis Blues	NHL	82	19	19	38	30	9	3	4	7	6
2012–13	VIK Västerås HK	Allsv	30	20	12	32	20	—	—	—	—	—
2012–13	St. Louis Blues	NHL	48	17	8	25	12	6	1	1	2	2
2013–14	St. Louis Blues	NHL	78	14	18	32	38	4	0	0	0	0
2014–15	St. Louis Blues	NHL	77	12	15	27	26	6	2	2	4	0
2015–16	St. Louis Blues	NHL	42	10	5	15	16	20	4	5	9	4
2016–17	St. Louis Blues	NHL	82	23	11	34	32	11	0	4	4	10
2017–18	St. Louis Blues	NHL	57	17	9	26	30	—	—	—	—	—
2018–19	Buffalo Sabres	NHL	23	2	2	4	6	—	—	—	—	—
2019–20	Djurgårdens IF	SHL	49	17	14	31	22	—	—	—	—	—
2020–21	Brynäs IF	SHL	45	13	14	27	20	—	—	—	—	—
NHL totals			717	170	156	326	248	60	10	16	26	24

=== International ===
Medal record

Representing Sweden

Men's ice hockey

Olympic Games
Silver medal – second place	2014 Sochi	

World Championships
Silver medal – second place	2011 Bratislava	
Bronze medal – third place	2009 Bern	

World Junior Championships
Silver medal – second place	2008 Pardubice	

Year	Team	Event	Result	GP	G	A	Pts	PIM
2005	Sweden	U18	7th	5	0	2	2	8
2006	Sweden	WJC18	6th	6	4	1	5	2
2007	Sweden	WJC	4th	7	1	2	3	0
2008	Sweden	WJC	2nd place, silver medalist(s)	6	3	4	7	14
2009	Sweden	WC	3rd place, bronze medalist(s)	7	0	1	1	0
2011	Sweden	WC	2nd place, silver medalist(s)	9	8	2	10	8
2014	Sweden	OG	2nd place, silver medalist(s)	6	2	1	3	4
2016	Sweden	WCH	3rd	2	1	0	1	0
Junior totals				24	8	9	17	24
Senior totals				24	11	4	15	12

== Awards and honors ==
Award	Year
NHL
NHL All-Rookie Team	2009
International
WJC All-Star Team	2008

Awards and achievements
Preceded by Erik Johnson	St. Louis Blues first-round draft pick 2006	Succeeded by Lars Eller
