= Per Johnsson =

Swedish ice hockey player

- Born: April 20, 1988 (age 38) Karlstad, Sweden
- Height: 6 ft 1 in (185 cm)
- Weight: 181 lb (82 kg; 12 st 13 lb)
- Position: Forward
- Shot: left
- Div.3 team Former teams: Sunne IK; Färjestad BK; HC TPS; EfB Ishockey
- NHL draft: 209th overall, 2006; Calgary Flames
- Playing career: 2005–2017

Per Johnsson (born April 20, 1988) is a Swedish professional ice hockey player who is currently playing with Sunne IK in the Hockeytvåan (Div.3). He was drafted by the Calgary Flames in the 2006 NHL entry draft as the 209th pick overall.

== Playing career ==
Johnsson played as a youth within Färjestad BK before making his professional and senior debut during the 2006–07 season. His father, Per-Erik Johnsson, was the coach of Färjestad BK when he made his debut, finishing with 1 point in 11 games.

Unsigned from the Calgary Flames, Johnsson also played in the Finnish SM-liiga with HC TPS.

== Career statistics ==
			Regular season					Playoffs
Season	Team	League	GP	G	A	Pts	PIM	GP	G	A	Pts	PIM
2004–05	Färjestad BK	J18 Allsv	12	2	2	4	10	2	0	0	0	2
2005–06	Färjestad BK	J18 Allsv	14	3	1	4	38	8	1	1	2	22
2006–07	Färjestad BK	SEL	11	0	1	1	0	—	—	—	—	—
2006–07	Skåre BK	SWE.3	25	3	4	7	42	—	—	—	—	—
2007–08	Färjestad BK	SEL	16	0	1	1	0	—	—	—	—	—
2007–08	Skåre BK	SWE.3	38	3	15	18	102	—	—	—	—	—
2008–09	Bofors IK	Allsv	14	1	1	2	22	—	—	—	—	—
2008–09	Malmö Redhawks	Allsv	28	1	1	2	12	—	—	—	—	—
2008–09	Färjestad BK	SEL	—	—	—	—	—	1	0	0	0	0
2009–10	Färjestad BK	SEL	29	0	3	3	14	—	—	—	—	—
2009–10	TPS	SM-liiga	7	0	2	2	2	—	—	—	—	—
2009–10	Örebro HK	Allsv	10	0	2	2	4	—	—	—	—	—
2010–11	Esbjerg fB Ishockey	DEN	28	3	6	9	52	—	—	—	—	—
2011–12	IF Troja/Ljungby	Allsv	45	0	3	3	28	—	—	—	—	—
2012–13	Mariestad BoIS HC	SWE.3	36	6	8	14	20	—	—	—	—	—
2013–14	Kils AIK	SWE.5	19	11	9	20	49	8	2	6	8	6
2014–15	Kils AIK	SWE.4	20	9	11	20	22	1	0	0	0	2
2015–16	IFK Munkfors	SWE.4	19	2	10	12	24	11	4	4	8	6
2016–17	Kils AIK	SWE.5	18	9	12	21	16	4	3	2	5	2
SEL totals			56	0	5	5	14	1	0	0	0	0
Allsv totals			97	2	7	9	66	—	—	—	—	—
