= Timo Seppänen =

Finnish ice hockey player

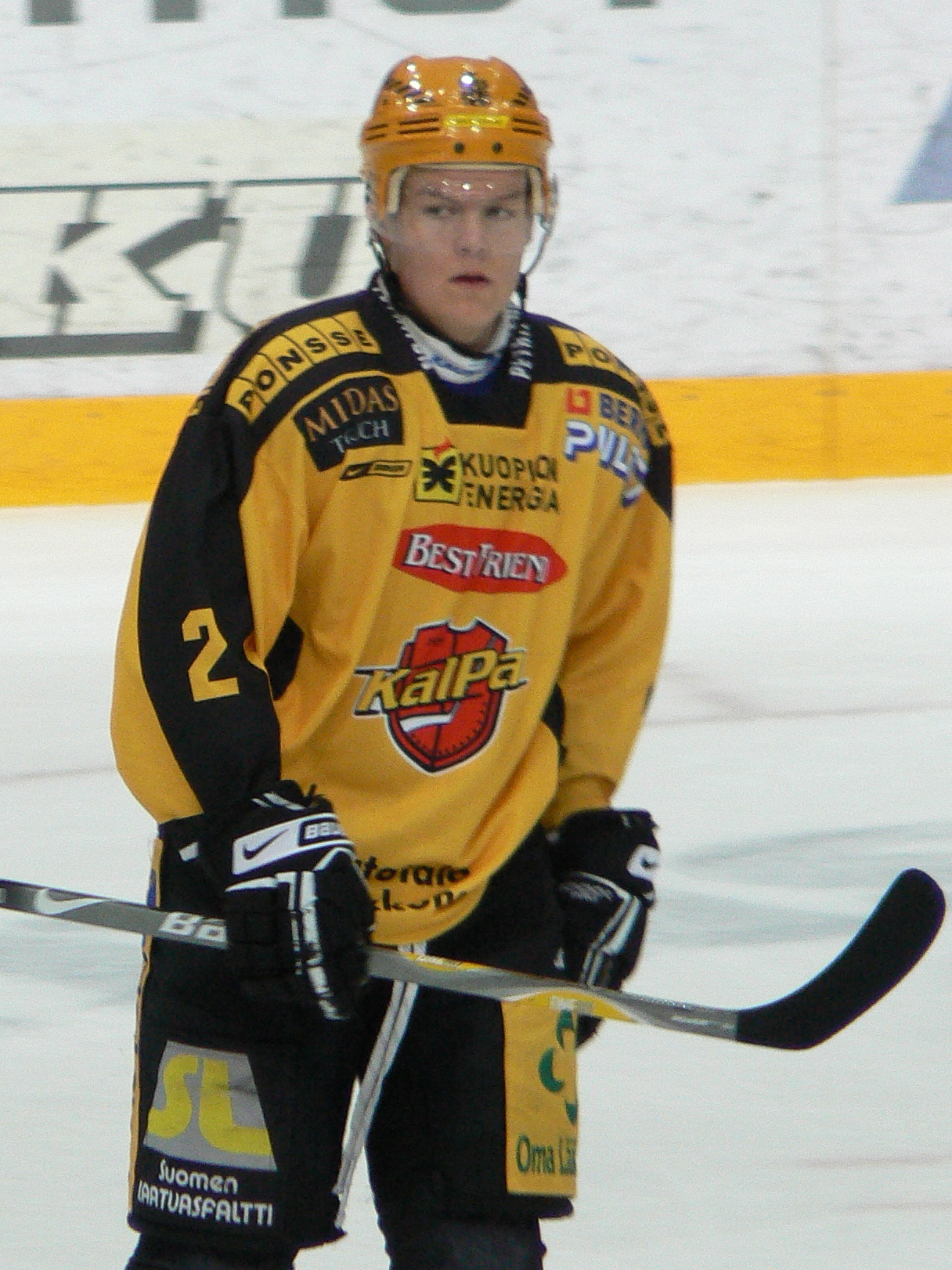
- Born: 22 July 1987 (age 38) Helsinki, Finland
- Height: 6 ft 1 in (185 cm)
- Weight: 210 lb (95 kg; 15 st 0 lb)
- Position: defence
- Shot: Left
- Played for: HIFK; HPK; KalPa; Södertälje SK; HC TPS
- NHL draft: 185th overall, 2006; Pittsburgh Penguins
- Playing career: 2005–2013

Timo Seppänen (born 22 July 1987) is a Finnish former professional ice hockey defenseman who most notably played in the Liiga and Elitserien. Seppänen was drafted 185th overall in the 2006 NHL entry draft by the Pittsburgh Penguins.

== Playing career ==
He began his professional career in 2005 with HIFK in the SM-liiga. Un-signed by the Penguins, Seppänen continued his career in the SM-liiga playing with HPK and KalPa.

Following the 2012–13 season, going scoreless in 26 regular season games with HC TPS, Seppänen ended his eight-year playing career.

== Career statistics ==
=== Regular season and playoffs ===
			Regular season					Playoffs
Season	Team	League	GP	G	A	Pts	PIM	GP	G	A	Pts	PIM
2002–03	HIFK	FIN U18	24	2	5	7	12	2	2	0	2	0
2003–04	HIFK	FIN U18	7	2	5	7	32	4	0	2	2	6
2003–04	HIFK	FIN U20	29	0	4	4	6	7	0	0	0	2
2004–05	HIFK	FIN U18	—	—	—	—	—	7	2	3	5	26
2004–05	HIFK	FIN U20	39	3	4	7	32	3	0	0	0	4
2005–06	HIFK	FIN U20	30	7	11	18	65	—	—	—	—	—
2005–06	HIFK	SM-liiga	21	0	0	0	2	5	0	1	1	0
2005–06	Suomi U20	Mestis	6	2	2	4	10	—	—	—	—	—
2006–07	HIFK	FIN U20	12	2	2	4	10	—	—	—	—	—
2006–07	HIFK	SM-liiga	12	0	0	0	10	—	—	—	—	—
2006–07	HPK	FIN U20	5	1	1	2	6	—	—	—	—	—
2006–07	HPK	SM-liiga	16	2	1	3	10	—	—	—	—	—
2006–07	Suomi U20	Mestis	6	1	0	1	6	—	—	—	—	—
2007–08	HIFK	FIN U20	1	0	1	1	2	—	—	—	—	—
2007–08	HIFK	SM-liiga	3	0	0	0	0	—	—	—	—	—
2007–08	KalPa	SM-liiga	49	6	6	12	30	—	—	—	—	—
2008–09	KalPa	SM-liiga	57	3	7	10	42	12	2	2	4	12
2009–10	KalPa	FIN U20	2	2	3	5	2	—	—	—	—	—
2009–10	KalPa	SM-liiga	44	1	4	5	34	12	1	0	1	10
2010–11	Södertälje SK	SEL	48	1	3	4	22	—	—	—	—	—
2011–12	TPS	SM-liiga	57	2	5	7	49	2	0	0	0	0
2012–13	TPS	SM-liiga	26	0	0	0	16	—	—	—	—	—
SM-liiga totals			285	14	23	37	193	31	3	3	6	22

=== International ===
Year	Team	Event	GP	G	A	Pts	PIM
2004	Finland	U17	5	0	1	1	6
2005	Finland	WJC18	6	2	1	3	0
2006	Finland	WJC	7	2	2	4	4
2007	Finland	WJC	6	0	3	3	10
Junior totals			24	4	7	11	20
