= Yuri Alexandrov (ice hockey) =

Russian ice hockey player (born 1988)

Yury Alexandrov
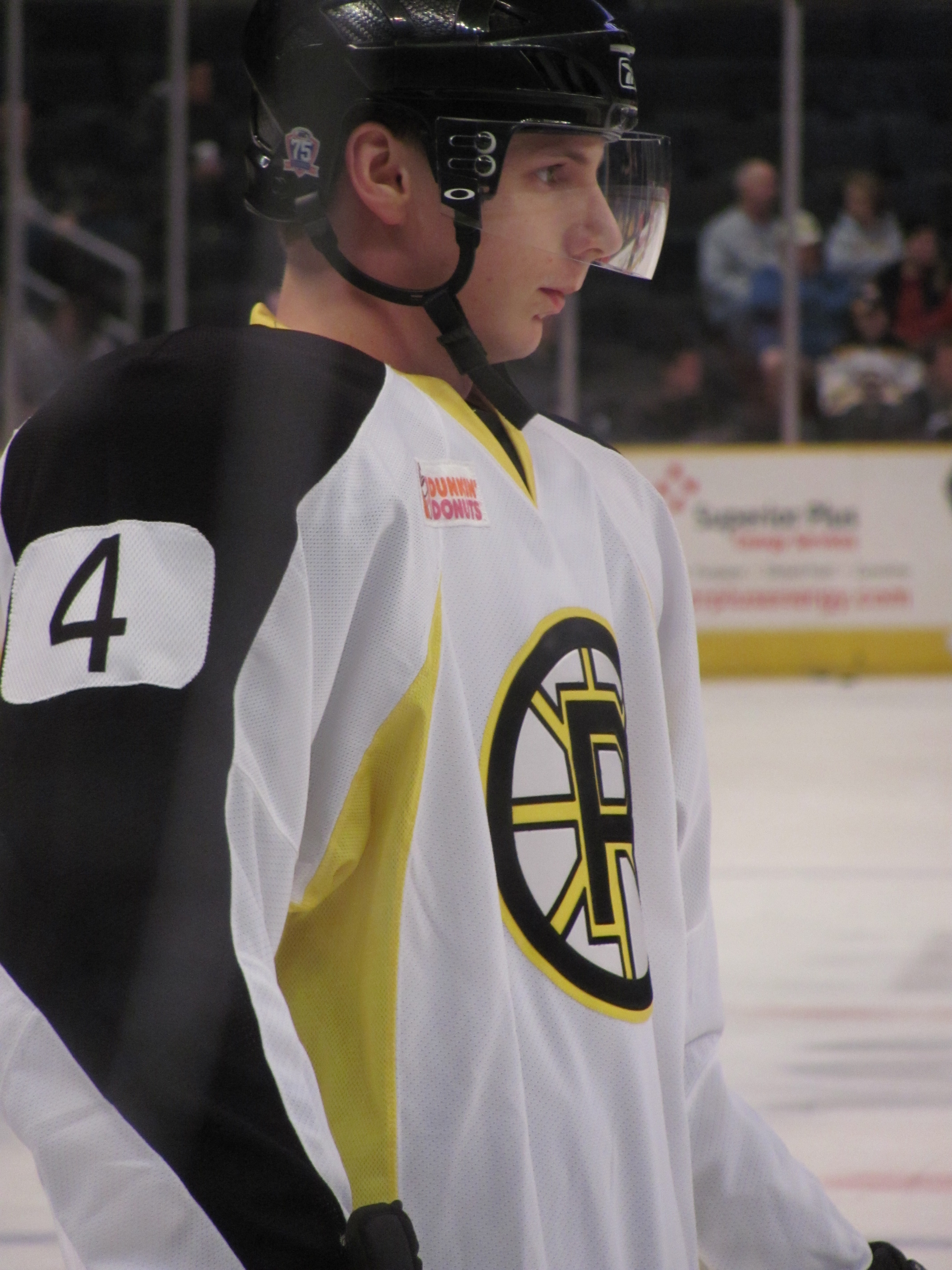
- Born: June 24, 1988 (age 37) Cherepovets, Russian SFSR, Soviet Union
- Height: 6 ft 1 in (185 cm)
- Weight: 185 lb (84 kg; 13 st 3 lb)
- Position: Defence
- Shoots: Left
- KHL team Former teams: Free agent Severstal Cherepovets; Providence Bruins; SKA Saint Petersburg; Avangard Omsk; HC Sochi
- NHL draft: 37th overall, 2006; Boston Bruins
- Playing career: 2003–present

Yury Alexandrovich Alexandrov (Russian: Юрий Александров, Russian pronunciation: [ˈjʉrʲij ɐlʲɪˈksandrəf]; born June 24, 1988) is a Russian professional ice hockey defenceman currently an unrestricted free agent. He most recently played as an alternate captain for HC Sochi in the Kontinental Hockey League (KHL).

== Playing career ==
A defenceman, Alexandrov was drafted 37th overall by the Boston Bruins in the second round of the 2006 NHL entry draft. He debuted with his hometown Severstal Cherepovets of the then-Russian Hockey Super League in their 2005–06 season. On May 30, 2010, Alexandrov signed a two-year $1.5 million, entry level, two-way contract with the Boston Bruins of the National Hockey League. Alexandrov played the 2010–11 season in the American Hockey League with the Providence Bruins.

On August 29, 2011, Alexandrov opted to end his North American career, and returned to the KHL in signing a multi-year contract with SKA Saint Petersburg.

== Career statistics ==
=== Regular season and playoffs ===
			Regular season					Playoffs
Season	Team	League	GP	G	A	Pts	PIM	GP	G	A	Pts	PIM
2003–04	Severstal–2 Cherepovets	RUS.3	32	0	2	2	10	4	0	0	0	0
2004–05	Severstal–2 Cherepovets	RUS.3	27	2	0	2	18	—	—	—	—	—
2005–06	Severstal Cherepovets	RSL	37	1	0	1	18	2	0	0	0	2
2005–06	Severstal–2 Cherepovets	RUS.3	2	0	0	0	4	—	—	—	—	—
2006–07	Severstal Cherepovets	RSL	45	1	1	2	38	5	0	0	0	8
2007–08	Severstal Cherepovets	RSL	45	5	4	9	32	8	0	0	0	8
2008–09	Severstal Cherepovets	KHL	26	3	5	8	40	—	—	—	—	—
2008–09	Severstal–2 Cherepovets	RUS.3	6	5	6	11	0	12	2	6	8	18
2009–10	Severstal Cherepovets	KHL	56	6	15	21	56	—	—	—	—	—
2009–10	Almaz Cherepovets	MHL	—	—	—	—	—	3	0	1	1	2
2010–11	Providence Bruins	AHL	66	6	13	19	44	—	—	—	—	—
2011–12	SKA Saint Petersburg	KHL	14	1	1	2	8	—	—	—	—	—
2011–12	Avangard Omsk	KHL	23	2	3	5	8	11	2	4	6	4
2012–13	SKA Saint Petersburg	KHL	50	3	14	17	34	15	1	3	4	6
2013–14	SKA Saint Petersburg	KHL	52	2	6	8	46	10	1	4	5	27
2014–15	SKA Saint Petersburg	KHL	52	3	4	7	52	13	0	1	1	2
2015–16	Avangard Omsk	KHL	60	6	8	14	22	11	2	3	5	4
2016–17	HC Sochi	KHL	37	3	4	7	16	—	—	—	—	—
2017–18	HC Sochi	KHL	26	1	1	2	12	—	—	—	—	—
2018–19	HC Sochi	KHL	40	2	7	9	8	6	0	0	0	2
2019–20	HC Sochi	KHL	61	5	15	20	30	—	—	—	—	—
2020–21	HC Sochi	KHL	60	3	14	17	52	—	—	—	—	—
2021–22	HC Sochi	KHL	29	2	9	11	14	—	—	—	—	—
2022–23	HC Sochi	KHL	62	2	10	12	18	—	—	—	—	—
RSL totals			127	7	5	12	88	15	0	0	0	18
KHL totals			648	44	116	160	428	66	6	15	21	45

Medal record

Representing Russia

Ice hockey

World Junior Championships
Silver medal – second place	2007 Sweden	
Bronze medal – third place	2008 Czech Republic	

=== International ===
Year	Team	Event	Result	GP	G	A	Pts	PIM
2005	Russia	U18	4th	5	2	0	2	2
2006	Russia	WJC18	5th	6	1	2	3	10
2007	Russia	WJC	2nd place, silver medalist(s)	6	0	0	0	4
2008	Russia	WJC	3rd place, bronze medalist(s)	7	1	0	1	4
Junior totals				24	4	2	6	20
