= 2006 NHL entry draft =

2006 ice hockey draft

General information
- Date: June 24, 2006
- Location: General Motors Place; Vancouver, British Columbia, Canada

Overview
- 213 total selections in 7 rounds
- First selection: (United States) Erik Johnson (St. Louis Blues)

The 2006 NHL entry draft was the 44th draft for the National Hockey League. It was held at General Motors Place in Vancouver on June 24, 2006.

The draft order for the first 14 picks was decided during a lottery held on April 20. The draft was televised in Canada on TSN and RDS, with the first three hours simulcast in the United States on OLN.

As of 2026, the six remaining active players in the NHL from this draft are Nick Foligno, Claude Giroux, Brad Marchand, Jeff Petry, James Reimer, Jordan Staal and Semyon Varlamov.

== Draft day trades ==
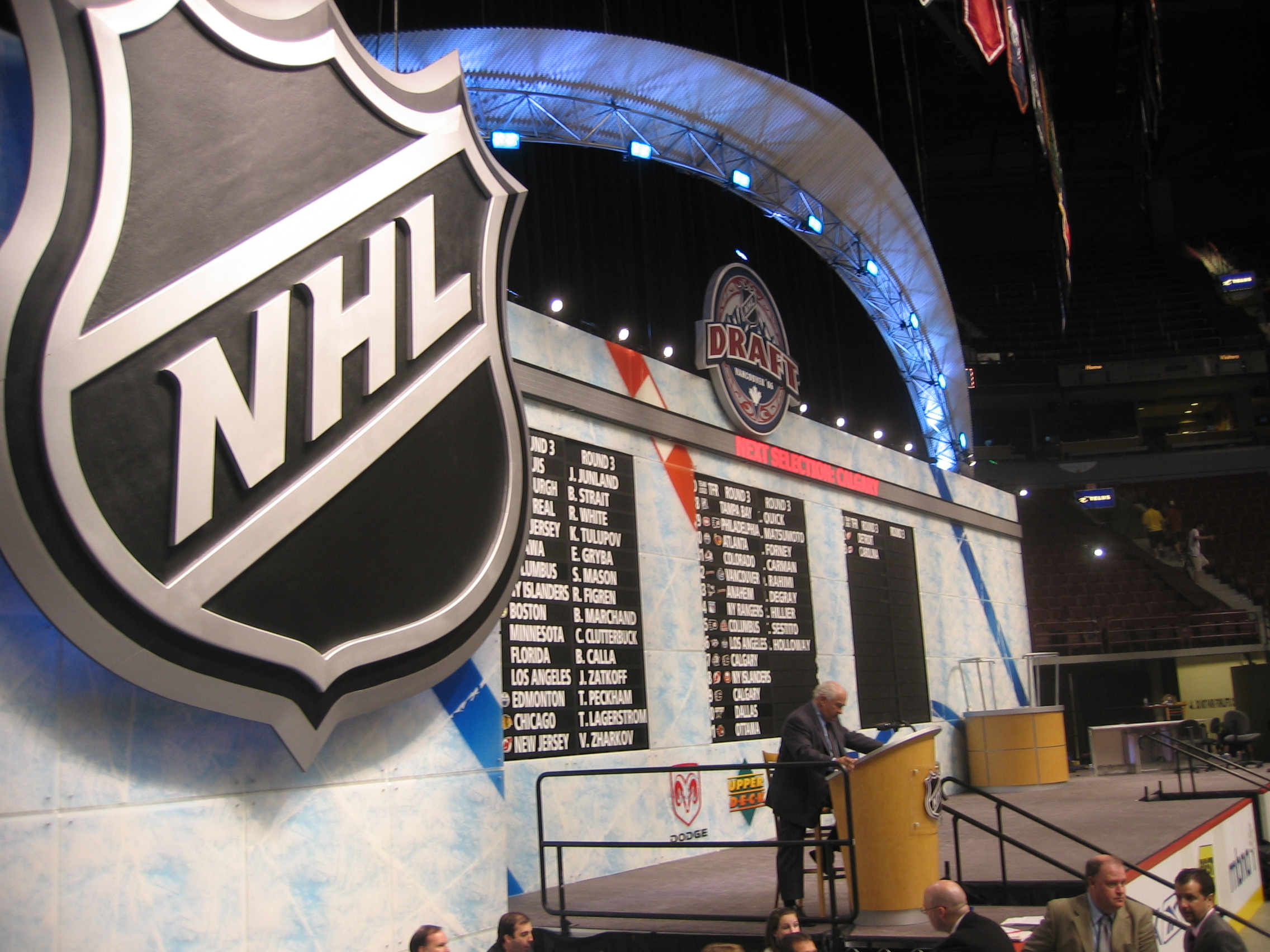
Draft stage

- The Florida Panthers traded Roberto Luongo, Lukas Krajicek and the 163rd pick (Sergei Shirokov) to the Vancouver Canucks for Todd Bertuzzi, Alex Auld and Bryan Allen. (This trade was completed two days prior to the draft, and officially announced the day before it.)
- The Atlanta Thrashers traded Patrik Stefan and Jaroslav Modry to the Dallas Stars for Niko Kapanen and the 210th pick (Will O'Neill).
- The Colorado Avalanche traded Alex Tanguay to the Calgary Flames for Jordan Leopold, the 59th pick (Codey Burki) and a conditional draft pick in 2007 or 2008.
- The Montreal Canadiens traded the 16th pick (Ty Wishart) to the San Jose Sharks for the 20th pick (David Fischer) and the 53rd pick (Mathieu Carle).
- The Los Angeles Kings traded Pavol Demitra to the Minnesota Wild for Patrick O'Sullivan and the 17th pick (Trevor Lewis).
- The Boston Bruins traded Andrew Raycroft to the Toronto Maple Leafs for Tuukka Rask.

== Final central scouting rankings ==
=== Skaters ===
	North American	European
1	(United States) Erik Johnson (D)	(Sweden) Nicklas Backstrom (C)
2	(Canada) Jordan Staal (C)	(Czech Republic) Michael Frolik (RW)
3	(Canada) Jonathan Toews (C)	(Czech Republic) Jiri Tlusty (LW)
4	(Canada) Derick Brassard (C)	(Russia) Yuri Alexandrov (D)
5	(United States) Phil Kessel (C/RW)	(Czech Republic) Tomas Kana (C)
6	(United States) Peter Mueller (C)	(Russia) Artem Anisimov (C)
7	(Canada) Bryan Little (C)	(Russia) Alexander Vasyunov (LW)
8	(Canada) Chris Stewart (RW)	(Sweden) Patrik Berglund (C)
9	(Canada) James Sheppard (C/LW)	(Russia) Andrei Popov (RW)
10	(Canada) Cory Emmerton (LW/C)	(Sweden) Jonas Ahnelov (D)

=== Goaltenders ===
	North American	European
1	(Canada) Jonathan Bernier	(Sweden) Jhonas Enroth
2	(Canada) Leland Irving	(Russia) Semyon Varlamov
3	(United States) Jeff Zatkoff	(Switzerland) Reto Berra

== Selections by round ==
= NHL All-Star team ·	= NHL All-Star (Note: Players are identified as an All-Star if they were selected for the All-Star game at any time in their career.) ·	= NHL All-Star and NHL All-Star team ·

=== Round one ===
#	Player	Nationality	NHL team	College/junior/club team
1	Erik Johnson (D)	United States	St. Louis Blues	US NTDP (NAHL)
2	Jordan Staal (C)	Canada	Pittsburgh Penguins	Peterborough Petes (OHL)
3	Jonathan Toews (C)	Canada	Chicago Blackhawks	University of North Dakota (WCHA)
4	Nicklas Backstrom (C)	Sweden	Washington Capitals	Brynas IF (Sweden)
5	Phil Kessel (RW)	United States	Boston Bruins	University of Minnesota (WCHA)
6	Derick Brassard (C)	Canada	Columbus Blue Jackets	Drummondville Voltigeurs (QMJHL)
7	Kyle Okposo (RW)	United States	New York Islanders	Des Moines Buccaneers (USHL)
8	Peter Mueller (C)	United States	Phoenix Coyotes	Everett Silvertips (WHL)
9	James Sheppard (C/LW)	Canada	Minnesota Wild	Cape Breton Screaming Eagles (QMJHL)
10	Michael Frolik (RW)	Czech Republic	Florida Panthers	HC Rabat Kladno (Czech Republic)
11	Jonathan Bernier (G)	Canada	Los Angeles Kings	Lewiston Maineiacs (QMJHL)
12	Bryan Little (C)	Canada	Atlanta Thrashers	Barrie Colts (OHL)
13	Jiri Tlusty (LW)	Czech Republic	Toronto Maple Leafs	HC Rabat Kladno (Czech Republic)
14	Michael Grabner (RW)	Austria	Vancouver Canucks	Spokane Chiefs (WHL)
15	Riku Helenius (G)	Finland	Tampa Bay Lightning	Ilves Jr. (Finland)
16	Ty Wishart (D)	Canada	San Jose Sharks (from Montreal)	Prince George Cougars (WHL)
17	Trevor Lewis (C)	United States	Los Angeles Kings (from Edmonton via Minnesota)	Des Moines Buccaneers (USHL)
18	Chris Stewart (RW)	Canada	Colorado Avalanche	Kingston Frontenacs (OHL)
19	Mark Mitera (D)	United States	Anaheim Ducks	University of Michigan (CCHA)
20	David Fischer (D)	United States	Montreal Canadiens (from San Jose)	Apple Valley High School (USHS–MN)
21	Bobby Sanguinetti (D)	United States	New York Rangers	Owen Sound Attack (OHL)
22	Claude Giroux (C/RW)	Canada	Philadelphia Flyers	Gatineau Olympiques (QMJHL)
23	Semyon Varlamov (G)	Russia	Washington Capitals (from Nashville)	Lokomotiv Yaroslavl (Russia)
24	Dennis Persson (D)	Sweden	Buffalo Sabres	VIK Vasteras HK (Sweden)
25	Patrik Berglund (C)	Sweden	St. Louis Blues (from New Jersey)	VIK Vasteras HK (Sweden)
26	Leland Irving (G)	Canada	Calgary Flames	Everett Silvertips (WHL)
27	Ivan Vishnevskiy (D)	Russia	Dallas Stars	Rouyn-Noranda Huskies (QMJHL)
28	Nick Foligno (LW)	United States	Ottawa Senators	Sudbury Wolves (OHL)
29	Chris Summers (D)	United States	Phoenix Coyotes (from Detroit)	US NTDP (NAHL)
30	Matt Corrente (D)	Canada	New Jersey Devils (from Carolina via St. Louis)	Saginaw Spirit (OHL)

=== Round two ===
#	Player	Nationality	NHL team	College/junior/club team
31	Tomas Kana (C)	Czech Republic	St. Louis Blues	HC Vitkovice (Czech Republic)
32	Carl Sneep (D)	United States	Pittsburgh Penguins	Brainerd High School (USHS–MN)
33	Igor Makarov (RW)	Russia	Chicago Blackhawks	Krylya Sovetov (Russia)
34	Michal Neuvirth (G)	Czech Republic	Washington Capitals	Sparta Prague (Czech Republic)
35	Francois Bouchard (RW)	Canada	Washington Capitals (from Boston)	Baie-Comeau Drakkar (QMJHL)
36	Jamie McGinn (LW)	Canada	San Jose Sharks (from Columbus)	Ottawa 67's (OHL)
37	Yuri Alexandrov (D)	Russia	Boston Bruins (compensatory)	Severstal Cherepovets (Russia)
38	Bryce Swan (RW)	Canada	Anaheim Ducks (from New York Islanders via Vancouver)	Halifax Mooseheads (QMJHL)
39	Andreas Nodl (RW)	Austria	Philadelphia Flyers (from Phoenix)	Sioux Falls Stampede (USHL)
40	Ondrej Fiala (C)	Czech Republic	Minnesota Wild	Everett Silvertips (WHL)
41	Cory Emmerton (C/LW)	Canada	Detroit Red Wings (from Phoenix via Florida and Philadelphia)	Kingston Frontenacs (OHL)
42	Mike Ratchuk (D)	United States	Philadelphia Flyers (from Los Angeles)	US NTDP (NAHL)
43	Riley Holzapfel (C)	Canada	Atlanta Thrashers	Moose Jaw Warriors (WHL)
44	Nikolay Kulemin (F)	Russia	Toronto Maple Leafs	Metallurg Magnitogorsk (Russia)
45	Jeff Petry (D)	United States	Edmonton Oilers (compensatory)	Des Moines Buccaneers (USHL)
46	Jhonas Enroth (G)	Sweden	Buffalo Sabres (from Vancouver)	Sodertalje SK (Sweden)
47	Shawn Matthias (C)	Canada	Detroit Red Wings (from Phoenix via Tampa Bay and Philadelphia)	Belleville Bulls (OHL)
48	Joey Ryan (D)	United States	Los Angeles Kings (compensatory)	Quebec Remparts (QMJHL)
49	Ben Maxwell (C)	Canada	Montreal Canadiens	Kootenay Ice (WHL)
50	Milan Lucic (LW)	Canada	Boston Bruins (from Edmonton)	Vancouver Giants (WHL)
51	Nigel Williams (D)	United States	Colorado Avalanche	US NTDP (NAHL)
52	Keith Seabrook (D)	Canada	Washington Capitals (from Anaheim)	Burnaby Express (BCHL)
53	Mathieu Carle (D)	Canada	Montreal Canadiens (from San Jose)	Acadie-Bathurst Titan (QMJHL)
54	Artem Anisimov (C)	Russia	New York Rangers	Lokomotiv Yaroslavl (Russia)
55	Denis Bodrov (D)	Russia	Philadelphia Flyers	Lada Togliatti (Russia)
56	Blake Geoffrion (LW)	United States	Nashville Predators	US NTDP (NAHL)
57	Mike Weber (D)	United States	Buffalo Sabres	Windsor Spitfires (OHL)
58	Alexander Vasyunov (LW)	Russia	New Jersey Devils	Lokomotiv Yaroslavl (Russia)
59	Codey Burki (C)	Canada	Colorado Avalanche (from Calgary)	Brandon Wheat Kings (WHL)
60	Jesse Joensuu (F)	Finland	New York Islanders (from Dallas)	Assat (Finland)
61	Simon Danis-Pepin (D)	Canada	Chicago Blackhawks (from Ottawa)	University of Maine (Hockey East)
62	Dick Axelsson (F)	Sweden	Detroit Red Wings	Huddinge IK (Sweden)
63	Jamie McBain (D)	United States	Carolina Hurricanes	US NTDP (NAHL)

=== Round three ===
#	Player	Nationality	NHL team	College/junior/club team
64	Jonas Junland (D)	Sweden	St. Louis Blues	Linkopings HC (Sweden)
65	Brian Strait (D)	United States	Pittsburgh Penguins	US NTDP (NAHL)
66	Ryan White (C)	Canada	Montreal Canadiens (from Chicago via Philadelphia)	Calgary Hitmen (WHL)
67	Kirill Tulupov (D)	Russia	New Jersey Devils (from Washington)	Alemetjevsk (Russia)
68	Eric Gryba (D)	Canada	Ottawa Senators (from Boston)	Green Bay Gamblers (USHL)
69	Steve Mason (G)	Canada	Columbus Blue Jackets	London Knights (OHL)
70	Robin Figren (F)	Sweden	New York Islanders	Frolunda HC (Sweden)
71	Brad Marchand (LW)	Canada	Boston Bruins (from Phoenix via New York Islanders)	Halifax Mooseheads (QMJHL)
72	Cal Clutterbuck (RW)	Canada	Minnesota Wild	Oshawa Generals (OHL)
73	Brady Calla (RW)	Canada	Florida Panthers	Everett Silvertips (WHL)
74	Jeff Zatkoff (G)	United States	Los Angeles Kings	Miami University (CCHA)
75	Theo Peckham (D)	Canada	Edmonton Oilers (from Atlanta)	Owen Sound Attack (OHL)
76	Tony Lagerstrom (C)	Sweden	Chicago Blackhawks (from Toronto)	Sodertalje SK (Sweden)
77	Vladimir Zharkov (RW)	Russia	New Jersey Devils (from Vancouver via St. Louis)	CSKA Moscow (Russia)
78	Kevin Quick (D)	United States	Tampa Bay Lightning	Salisbury School (USHS–CT)
79	Jonathan Matsumoto (C)	Canada	Philadelphia Flyers (from Montreal)	Bowling Green University (CCHA)
80	Michael Forney (LW)	United States	Atlanta Thrashers (from Edmonton)	Thief River Falls (USHS–MN)
81	Mike Carman (C)	United States	Colorado Avalanche	US NTDP (NAHL)
82	Daniel Rahimi (D)	Sweden	Vancouver Canucks (from Anaheim)	IF Bjorkloven Jr. (Sweden)
83	John de Gray (D)	Canada	Anaheim Ducks (from San Jose via New York Rangers)	Brampton Battalion (OHL)
84	Ryan Hillier (LW)	Canada	New York Rangers	Halifax Mooseheads (QMJHL)
85	Tom Sestito (LW)	United States	Columbus Blue Jackets (from San Jose via Philadelphia)	Plymouth Whalers (OHL)
86	Bud Holloway (C/RW)	Canada	Los Angeles Kings (from Nashville via Philadelphia)	Seattle Thunderbirds (WHL)
87	John Armstrong (C/RW)	Canada	Calgary Flames (from Buffalo)	Plymouth Whalers (OHL)
88	Jonas Ahnelov (D)	Sweden	Phoenix Coyotes (from New York Islanders via New Jersey)	Frolunda HC (Sweden)
89	Aaron Marvin (C/W)	United States	Calgary Flames	Warroad High School (USHS–MN)
90	Aaron Snow (LW)	Canada	Dallas Stars	Brampton Battalion (OHL)
91	Kaspars Daugavins (LW)	Latvia	Ottawa Senators	HK Riga 2000 (Latvia)
92	Daniel Larsson (G)	Sweden	Detroit Red Wings	Hammarby IF (Sweden)
93	Harrison Reed (RW)	Canada	Carolina Hurricanes	Sarnia Sting (OHL)

=== Round four ===
#	Player	Nationality	NHL team	College/junior/club team
94	Ryan Turek (C)	United States	St. Louis Blues	Omaha Lancers (USHL)
95	Ben Shutron (D)	Canada	Chicago Blackhawks (from Pittsburgh)	Kingston Frontenacs (OHL)
96	Joe Palmer (G)	United States	Chicago Blackhawks	US NTDP (NAHL)
97	Oskar Osala (LW)	Finland	Washington Capitals	Mississauga IceDogs (OHL)
98	James DeLory (D)	Canada	San Jose Sharks (from Boston via Edmonton, Boston and New York Islanders)	Oshawa Generals (OHL)
99	James Reimer (G)	Canada	Toronto Maple Leafs (from Columbus via Carolina and Chicago)	Red Deer Rebels (WHL)
100	Rhett Rakhshani (RW)	United States	New York Islanders	US NTDP (NAHL)
101	Joonas Lehtivuori (D)	Finland	Philadelphia Flyers (from Phoenix)	Ilves (Finland)
102	Kyle Medvec (D)	United States	Minnesota Wild	University of Vermont (Hockey East)
103	Michael Caruso (D)	Canada	Florida Panthers	Guelph Storm (OHL)
104	David Kveton (RW)	Czech Republic	New York Rangers (from Los Angeles)	Vsetínska Hokejova (Czech Republic)
105	Niko Snellman (F)	Finland	Nashville Predators (from Atlanta)	Ilves (Finland)
106	Reto Berra (G)	Switzerland	St. Louis Blues (from Toronto via Carolina)	ZSC Lions (NLA)
107	T. J. Miller (D)	United States	New Jersey Devils (from Vancouver)	Penticton Vees (BCHL)
108	Jase Weslosky (G)	Canada	New York Islanders (from Tampa Bay via San Jose)	Sherwood Park Crusaders (AJHL)
109	Jakub Kovar (G)	Czech Republic	Philadelphia Flyers (from Montreal)	HC Ceske Budejovice Jr. (Czech Republic)
110	Kevin Montgomery (D)	United States	Colorado Avalanche (from Edmonton via New York Islanders)	US NTDP (NAHL)
111	Korbinian Holzer (D)	Germany	Toronto Maple Leafs (from Colorado via Chicago)	EC Bad Tolz (Germany)
112	Matt Beleskey (LW)	Canada	Anaheim Ducks	Belleville Bulls (OHL)
113	Ben Wright (D)	Canada	Columbus Blue Jackets (from San Jose)	Lethbridge Hurricanes (WHL)
114	Niclas Andersen (D)	Sweden	Los Angeles Kings (from New York Rangers)	Leksands IF (Sweden)
115	Tomas Marcinko (C)	Slovakia	New York Islanders (from Philadelphia via Phoenix)	HC Kosice (Slovakia)
116	Derrick LaPoint (D)	United States	Florida Panthers (from Nashville via Pittsburgh)	North High School (USHS–WI)
117	Felix Schutz (C)	Germany	Buffalo Sabres	Saint John Sea Dogs (QMJHL)
118	Hugo Carpentier (C)	Canada	Calgary Flames (from New Jersey)	Rouyn-Noranda Huskies (QMJHL)
119	Doug Rogers (C)	United States	New York Islanders (from Calgary via Phoenix)	Saint Sebastian's School (ISL)
120	Richard Bachman (G)	United States	Dallas Stars	Cushing Academy (USHS–MA)
121	Pierre-Luc Lessard (D)	Canada	Ottawa Senators	Gatineau Olympiques (QMJHL)
122	Luke Lynes (C/LW)	United States	Washington Capitals (from Detroit)	Brampton Battalion (OHL)
123	Bobby Hughes (C)	Canada	Carolina Hurricanes	Kingston Frontenacs (OHL)

=== Round five ===
#	Player	Nationality	NHL team	College/junior/club team
124	Andy Sackrison (C/LW)	United States	St. Louis Blues	Saint Louis Park High School (USHS–MN)
125	Chad Johnson (G)	Canada	Pittsburgh Penguins	University of Alaska Fairbanks (CCHA)
126	Shane Sims (D)	United States	New York Islanders (from Chicago via Boston)	Des Moines Buccaneers (USHL)
127	Maxime Lacroix (LW)	Canada	Washington Capitals	Quebec Remparts (QMJHL)
128	Andrew Bodnarchuk (D)	Canada	Boston Bruins	Halifax Mooseheads (QMJHL)
129	Robert Nyholm (RW)	Finland	Columbus Blue Jackets	HIFK (Finland)
130	Brett Bennett (G)	United States	Phoenix Coyotes (from New York Islanders)	US NTDP (NAHL)
131	Martin Latal (RW)	Czech Republic	Phoenix Coyotes	HC Rabat Kladno (Czech Republic)
132	Niko Hovinen (G)	Finland	Minnesota Wild	Jokerit (Finland)
133	Bryan Pitton (G)	Canada	Edmonton Oilers (from Florida)	Brampton Battalion (OHL)
134	David Meckler (C)	United States	Los Angeles Kings	Yale University (ECAC)
135	Alex Kangas (G)	United States	Atlanta Thrashers	Sioux Falls Stampede (USHL)
136	Nick Sucharski (LW)	Canada	Columbus Blue Jackets (from Toronto)	Michigan State University (CCHA)
137	Tomas Zaborsky (F)	Slovakia	New York Rangers (from Vancouver via Washington)	Dukla Trencin (Slovakia)
138	David McIntyre (C)	Canada	Dallas Stars (from Tampa Bay)	Newmarket Hurricanes (OPJHL)
139	Pavel Valentenko (D)	Russia	Montreal Canadiens	Neftekhimik Nizhnekamsk (Russia)
140	Cody Wild (D)	United States	Edmonton Oilers	Providence College (Hockey East)
141	Kim Johansson (F)	Sweden	New York Islanders (from Colorado)	Malmo Jr. (Sweden)
142	Maxim Frechette (D)	Canada	Columbus Blue Jackets (from Anaheim)	Drummondville Voltigeurs (QMJHL)
143	Ashton Rome (RW)	Canada	San Jose Sharks	Kamloops Blazers (WHL)
144	Martin Nolet (D)	Canada	Los Angeles Kings (from New York Rangers)	Champlain Cougars (QJAAAHL)
145	Jon Rheault (RW)	United States	Philadelphia Flyers	Providence College (Hockey East)
146	Mark Dekanich (G)	Canada	Nashville Predators	Colgate University (ECAC)
147	Alex Biega (D)	Canada	Buffalo Sabres	Salisbury School (USHS–CT)
148	Olivier Magnan (D)	Canada	New Jersey Devils	Rouyn-Noranda Huskies (QMJHL)
149	Juuso Puustinen (RW)	Finland	Calgary Flames	KalPa (Finland)
150	Max Warn (LW)	Finland	Dallas Stars	HIFK (Finland)
151	Ryan Daniels (G)	Canada	Ottawa Senators	Saginaw Spirit (OHL)
152	Jordan Bendfeld (D)	Canada	Phoenix Coyotes (from Detroit)	Medicine Hat Tigers (WHL)
153	Stefan Chaput (C)	Canada	Carolina Hurricanes	Lewiston Maineiacs (QMJHL)

=== Round six ===
#	Player	Nationality	NHL team	College/junior/club team
154	Matthew McCollem (LW)	United States	St. Louis Blues	Belmont Hill (ISL)
155	Peter Aston (D)	Canada	Florida Panthers (from Pittsburgh)	Windsor Spitfires (OHL)
156	Jan-Mikael Juutilainen (C)	Finland	Chicago Blackhawks	Jokerit (Finland)
157	Brent Gwidt (C)	United States	Washington Capitals	Lakeland High School (USHS–WI)
158	Levi Nelson (C)	Canada	Boston Bruins	Swift Current Broncos (WHL)
159	Jesse Dudas (D)	Canada	Columbus Blue Jackets	Prince George Cougars (WHL)
160	Andrew MacDonald (D)	Canada	New York Islanders	Moncton Wildcats (QMJHL)
161	Viktor Stalberg (LW)	Sweden	Toronto Maple Leafs (from Phoenix)	University of Vermont (Hockey East)
162	Julian Walker (F)	Switzerland	Minnesota Wild	EHC Basel (Switzerland)
163	Sergei Shirokov (F)	Russia	Vancouver Canucks (from Florida)	CSKA Moscow (Russia)
164	Constantin Braun (LW)	Germany	Los Angeles Kings	Eisbaren Berlin (Germany)
165	Jonas Enlund (C)	Finland	Atlanta Thrashers	HIFK (Finland)
166	Tyler Ruegsegger (C)	United States	Toronto Maple Leafs	Shattuck-Saint Mary's (Midget Major AAA)
167	Juraj Simek (LW)	Switzerland	Vancouver Canucks	Kloten Flyers (Switzerland)
168	Dane Crowley (D)	Canada	Tampa Bay Lightning	Swift Current Broncos (WHL)
169	Chris Auger (C)	Canada	Chicago Blackhawks (from Montreal)	Wellington Dukes (OPJHL)
170	Alexander Bumagin (LW)	Russia	Edmonton Oilers	Lada Togliatti (Russia)
171	Brian Day (RW)	United States	New York Islanders (from Colorado)	Governor Dummer Academy (USHS–MA)
172	Petteri Wirtanen (C)	Finland	Anaheim Ducks	HPK (Finland)
173	Stefan Ridderwall (G)	Sweden	New York Islanders (from San Jose)	Djurgardens IF Jr. (Sweden)
174	Eric Hunter (C)	Canada	New York Rangers	Prince George Cougars (WHL)
175	Michael Dupont (G)	Switzerland	Philadelphia Flyers	Baie-Comeau Drakkar (QMJHL)
176	Ryan Flynn (RW)	United States	Nashville Predators	US NTDP (NAHL)
177	Mathieu Perreault (C)	Canada	Washington Capitals (from Buffalo)	Acadie-Bathurst Titan (QMJHL)
178	Tony Romano (C)	United States	New Jersey Devils	New York Bobcats (AMHL)
179	Jordan Fulton (C)	United States	Calgary Flames	Breck School (USHS–MN)
180	Leo Komarov (C)	Finland	Toronto Maple Leafs (from Dallas)	Assat (Finland)
181	Kevin Koopman (D)	Canada	Ottawa Senators	Beaver Valley Nitehawks (KIJHL)
182	Jan Mursak (LW)	Slovenia	Detroit Red Wings	HC Ceske Budejovice Jr. (Czech Republic)
183	Nick Dodge (RW)	Canada	Carolina Hurricanes	Clarkson University (ECAC)

=== Round seven ===
#	Player	Nationality	NHL team	College/junior/club team
184	Alexander Hellstrom (D)	Sweden	St. Louis Blues	IF Bjorkloven (Sweden)
185	Timo Seppanen (D)	Finland	Pittsburgh Penguins	HIFK (Finland)
186	Peter LeBlanc (C/LW)	Canada	Chicago Blackhawks	Hamilton Red Wings (OPJHL)
187	Devin DiDiomete (LW)	Canada	Calgary Flames (from Washington)	Sudbury Wolves (OHL)
188	Chris Frank (D)	United States	Phoenix Coyotes (from Boston via Toronto)	Western Michigan University (CCHA)
189	Derek Dorsett (RW)	Canada	Columbus Blue Jackets	Medicine Hat Tigers (WHL)
190	Troy Mattila (LW)	United States	New York Islanders	Springfield Jr. Blues (NAHL)
191	Nick Oslund (RW)	United States	Detroit Red Wings (from Phoenix)	Burnsville High School (USHS–MN)
192	Chris Hickey (C)	United States	Minnesota Wild	Cretin-Derham Hall (USHS–MN)
193	Marc Cheverie (G)	Canada	Florida Panthers	Nanaimo Clippers (BCHL)
194	Matt Marquardt (LW)	Canada	Columbus Blue Jackets (from Los Angeles)	Moncton Wildcats (QMJHL)
195	Jesse Martin (C)	Canada	Atlanta Thrashers	Spruce Grove Saints (AJHL)
196	Benn Ferriero (C/RW)	United States	Phoenix Coyotes (from Toronto)	Boston College (Hockey East)
197	Evan Fuller (RW)	Canada	Vancouver Canucks	Prince George Cougars (WHL)
198	Denis Kazionov (LW)	Russia	Tampa Bay Lightning	MVD Tver (Russia)
199	Cameron Cepek (D)	United States	Montreal Canadiens	Portland Winterhawks (WHL)
200	Arturs Kulda (D)	Latvia	Atlanta Thrashers (from Edmonton)	CSKA Moscow (Russia)
201	Billy Sauer (G)	United States	Colorado Avalanche	University of Michigan (CCHA)
202	John McCarthy (LW)	United States	San Jose Sharks (from Anaheim)	Boston University (Hockey East)
203	Jay Barriball (F)	United States	San Jose Sharks	Sioux Falls Stampede (USHL)
204	Lukas Zeliska (C)	Slovakia	New York Rangers	Ocelari Trinec Jr. (Slovakia)
205	Andrei Popov (RW)	Russia	Philadelphia Flyers	Traktor Chelyabinsk (Russia)
206	Viktor Sjodin (F)	Sweden	Nashville Predators	VIK Vasteras HK Jr. (Sweden)
207	Benjamin Breault (C)	Canada	Buffalo Sabres	Baie-Comeau Drakkar (QMJHL)
208	Kyell Henegan (D)	Canada	New Jersey Devils	Shawinigan Cataractes (QMJHL)
209	Per Johnsson (F)	Sweden	Calgary Flames	Farjestad BK Jr. (Sweden)
210	Will O'Neill (D)	United States	Atlanta Thrashers (from Dallas)	Tabor Academy (USHS–MA)
211	Erik Condra (RW)	Canada	Ottawa Senators	University of Notre Dame (CCHA)
212	Logan Pyett (D)	Canada	Detroit Red Wings	Regina Pats (WHL)
213	Justin Krueger (D)	Germany	Carolina Hurricanes	Cornell University (ECAC)

== Draftees based on nationality ==
Rank	Country	Picks	Percent	Top selection
	North America	144	67.6%	
1	Canada	84	39.4%	Jordan Staal, 2nd
2	United States	60	28.2%	Erik Johnson, 1st
	Europe	70	32.4%	
3	Sweden	17	8.0%	Nicklas Backstrom, 4th
4	Russia	15	7.0%	Semyon Varlamov, 23rd
5	Finland	14	6.6%	Riku Helenius, 15th
6	Czech Republic	8	3.8%	Michael Frolik, 10th
7	Germany	4	1.9%	Korbinian Holzer, 111th
7	Switzerland	4	1.9%	Reto Berra, 106th
9	Slovakia	3	1.4%	Tomas Marcinko, 115th
10	Austria	2	0.9%	Michael Grabner, 14th
10	Latvia	2	0.9%	Kaspars Daugavins, 91st
12	Slovenia	1	0.4%	Jan Mursak, 182nd

=== North American draftees by province/state ===
Rank	State/province	Selections	Top selection
1	Ontario	32	Jordan Staal, 2nd
2	Quebec	16	Derick Brassard, 6th
3	Minnesota	15	Erik Johnson, 1st
4	New York	10	Nick Foligno, 28th
5	British Columbia	9	Ty Whishart, 16th
6	Michigan	8	Peter Mueller, 8th
6	Alberta	8	Leland Irving, 26th
6	Massachusetts	8	Joey Ryan, 48th
9	Manitoba	7	Jonathan Toews, 3rd
9	Nova Scotia	7	James Sheppard, 9th
11	Saskatchewan	5	Riley Holzapfel, 43rd
12	Wisconsin	3	Phil Kessel, 5th
12	Illinois	3	Nigel Williams, 51st
14	Utah	2	Trevor Lewis, 17th
14	California	2	Rhett Rakhshani, 100th
16	New Jersey	1	Bobby Sanguinetti, 21st
16	Tennessee	1	Blake Geoffrion, 56th
16	Pennsylvania	1	Mike Weber, 57th
16	Rhode Island	1	Cody Wild, 140th
16	New Hampshire	1	Jon Rheault, 145th
16	Colorado	1	Tyler Ruegsegger, 166th
16	Washington	1	Chris Frank, 188th

== See also ==
- 2006–07 NHL season
- List of NHL first overall draft choices
- List of NHL players
