= Erik Johnson =

American ice hockey player (born 1988)

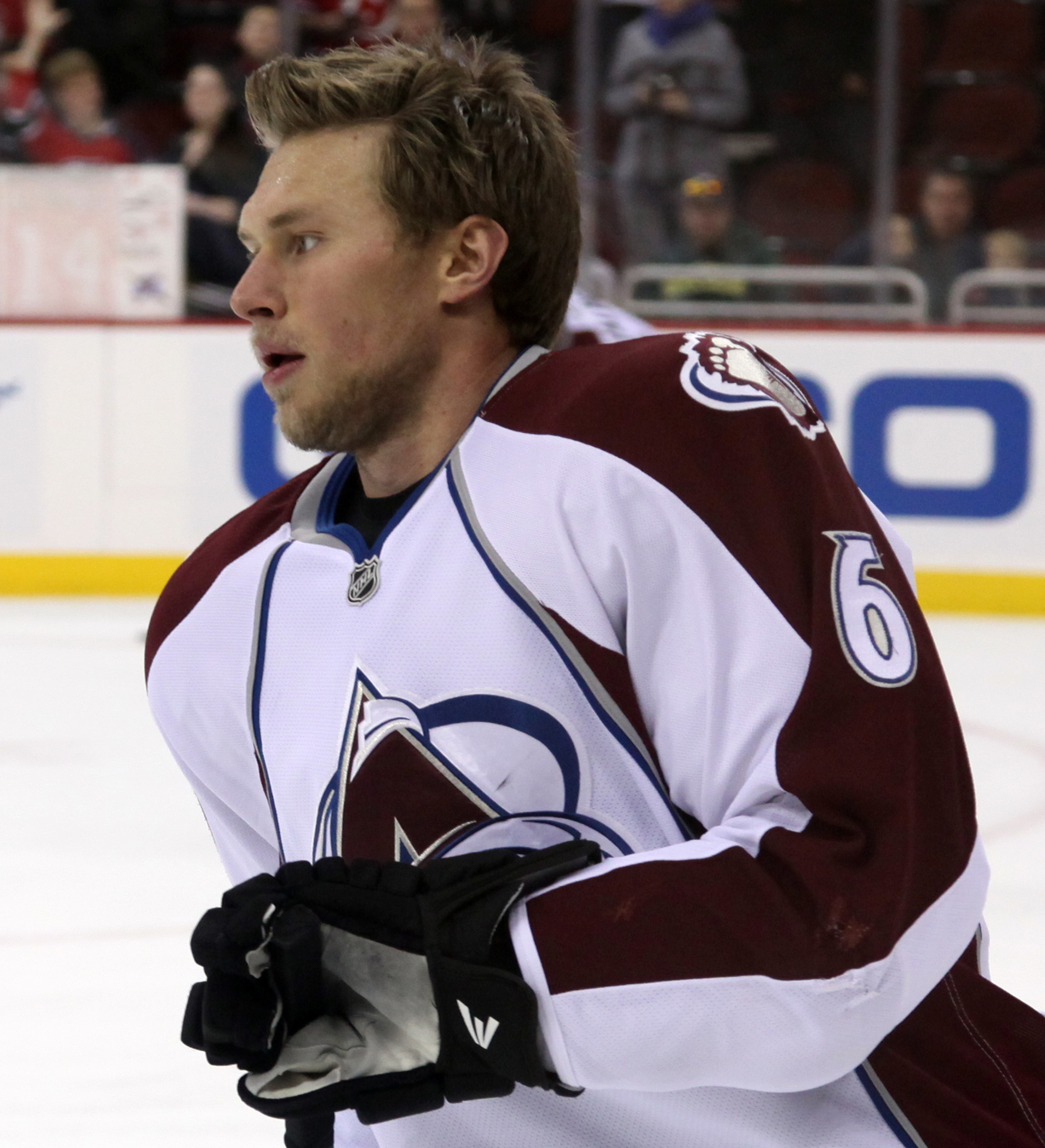
- Johnson with the Colorado Avalanche in November 2014
- Born: March 21, 1988 (age 38) Bloomington, Minnesota, U.S.
- Height: 6 ft 4 in (193 cm)
- Weight: 231 lb (105 kg; 16 st 7 lb)
- Position: Defense
- Shot: Right
- Played for: St. Louis Blues; Colorado Avalanche; Buffalo Sabres; Philadelphia Flyers
- National team: United States
- NHL draft: 1st overall, 2006; St. Louis Blues
- Playing career: 2007–2025

Erik Robert Johnson (born March 21, 1988) is an American former professional ice hockey defenseman who played 17 seasons in the National Hockey League (NHL) for the St. Louis Blues, Colorado Avalanche, Buffalo Sabres and the Philadelphia Flyers. Nicknamed the "Condor", Johnson was selected with the first overall pick by the Blues in the 2006 NHL entry draft. Johnson won the Stanley Cup with the Avalanche in 2022. Additionally, he has represented the United States in numerous tournaments.

Johnson was drafted from USA Hockey's National Team Development Program and played one season at the University of Minnesota before joining the NHL with St. Louis in 2007. In 2011, he was traded to Colorado, where he played for 13 seasons until signing with the Buffalo Sabres for the 2023–2024 NHL season. On March 7, 2025, he returned to the Colorado Avalanche organization in a trade between the Avalanche and the Philadelphia Flyers.

== Playing career ==
=== Junior ===
Johnson played hockey for the Academy of Holy Angels in Richfield, Minnesota, where he starred in his two seasons as a freshman and sophomore at the prep school. In the 2003–04 season he led all defenseman in scoring with 13 goals and 34 points to be selected to the Missota All-Conference Team. As a 16-year old, Johnson transferred to Ann Arbor, Michigan to play for the USA Hockey National Team Development Program (NTDP).

In the 2004–05 season, he split time between the U.S. National under-17 and under-18 squads, compiling 26 points in 57 games, tops amongst defenseman. Having been scouted as being tailored to suit the professional ranks with his hybrid two-way style and physicality, Johnson continued his rise in development the following season with a team-leading 49 points in 47 games with the under-18's. While also having a major impact at the junior international stage, Johnson was selected first overall in the 2006 NHL entry draft by the St. Louis Blues. He became the first American-born defenseman to be selected first overall without having played Canadian major junior or collegiate hockey. He joined a select group of five (now eight following Patrick Kane, Auston Matthews, and Jack Hughes) Americans to have been chosen first overall in an NHL entry draft, along with Rick DiPietro (2000), Bryan Berard (1995), Mike Modano (1988), and Brian Lawton (1983).

Having committed to the University of Minnesota, Johnson also became the first Golden Gopher and Minnesotan to be taken first overall. Despite the willingness to turn professional, Johnson was not signed to a professional contract with the Blues, becoming the first player in 44 years to play college hockey after being selected No.1 overall. In his freshman campaign with the Golden Gophers during the 2006–07 season, Johnson quickly established a top defensive role and accumulated 4 goals and 24 points in 41 contests to lead all WCHA rookie defenseman and earn a selection to the WCHA All-Rookie Team. Johnson concluded his collegiate career after his freshman year when he was signed by the St. Louis Blues to a three-year, entry-level contract on April 20, 2007.

=== Professional ===
==== St. Louis Blues (2007–2011) ====
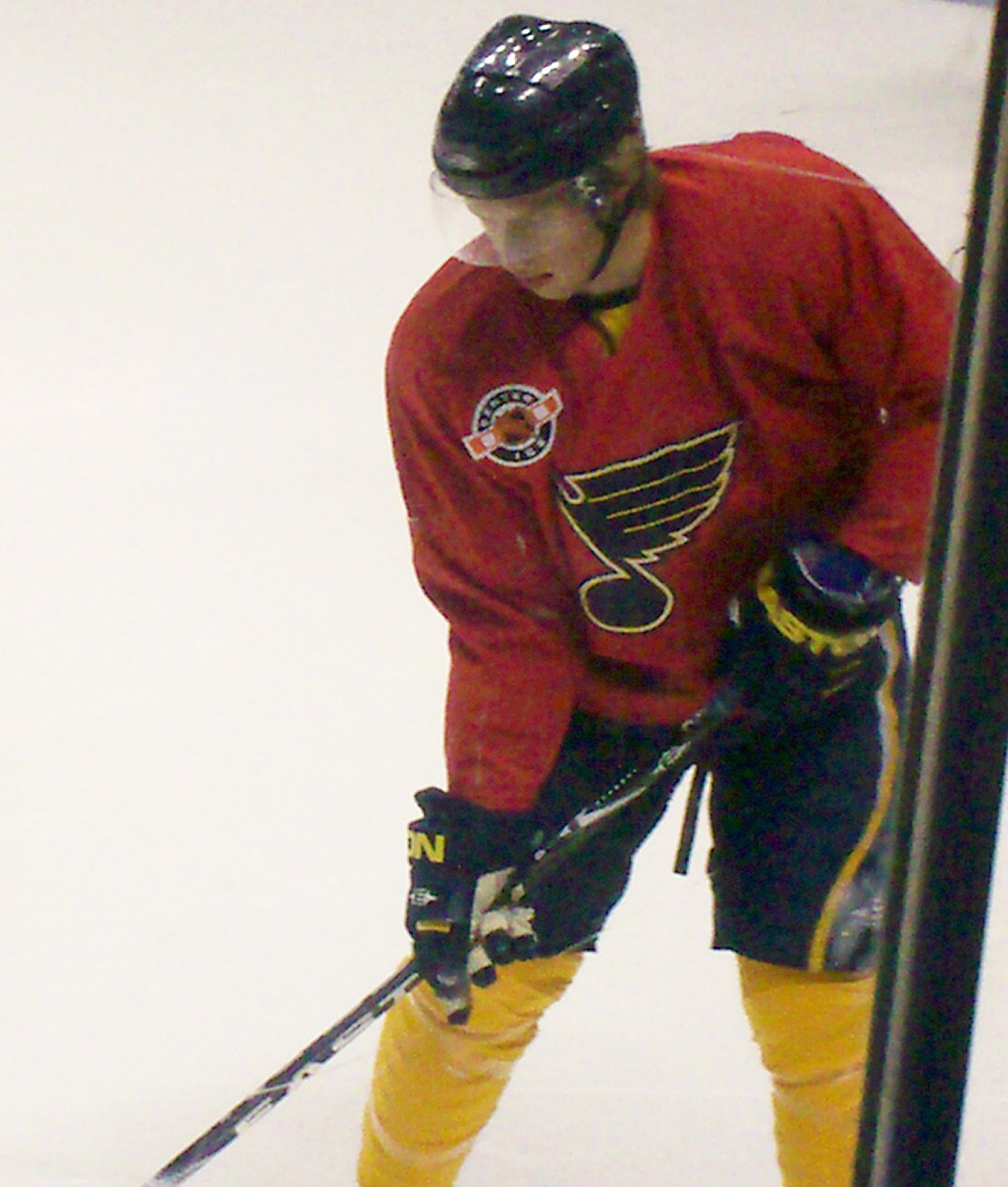
Johnson in January 2009

Upon concluding his collegiate career, Johnson attended the Blues' Development Camp and 2007 Prospects Tournament. His first career NHL goal came on October 6 in a 5–3 win over the Los Angeles Kings. The goal was scored on a power play with 7:17 left in the third period and became the game-winning goal. After playing three games with the Blues, Johnson suffered a slight bone fracture in his foot. As a result, he was re-assigned to the Peoria Rivermen of the American Hockey League (AHL) on a conditioning stint. Johnson re-joined the Blues on November 7 but struggled to get back into the lineup. However, once he became a mainstay in the Blues' lineup he began a productive rookie campaign. By January, he tallied 16 points to tie for 10th amongst all NHL rookies and fourth on the team with a plus-10 rating. As such, he was selected for the NHL's 2008 YoungStars Game. As the season continued, his ice time fluctuated from a season high 22:0 to a season-low 11 minutes although he typically averaged 17 minutes per game. He finished his rookie season averaging over 18 minutes of ice-time per game to go with 5 goals and 28 assists in 69 games.

Following his rookie season, Johnson injured his right knee during the 2008 offseason which sidelined him for the first three days of training camp. It was later confirmed by the team's orthopedic surgeon that Johnson had torn his ACL and MCL. In November, Johnson underwent surgery successful right knee ACL surgery, causing him to miss the entire 2008-09 season. Johnson returned for the 2009–10 season strong by setting new career-highs with 10 goals, 29 assists for 39 points. On August 2, 2010, as a restricted free agent, Johnson re-signed with the Blues with a two-year, $5.2 million contract.

In the first year of his newest contract, Johnson was named an alternate captain alongside David Backes, Barret Jackman, and Alexander Steen. Johnson tallied one goal and nine assists in 29 games before suffering a knee injury in December 2010.

==== Colorado Avalanche (2011–2023) ====
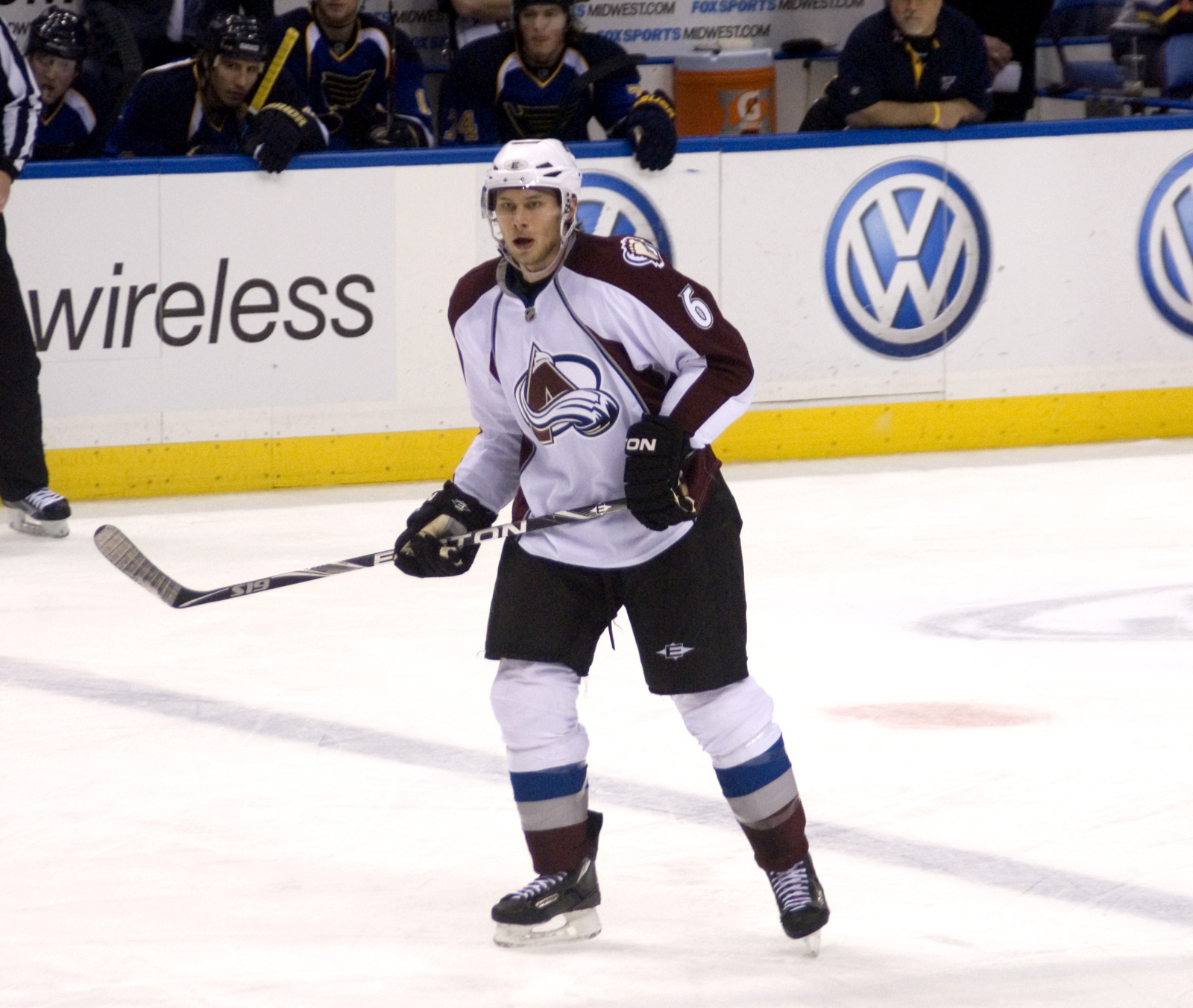
Johnson with the Colorado Avalanche in February 2011

Upon returning from his knee injury, Johnson was traded to the Colorado Avalanche, along with Jay McClement and a conditional first-round pick, in exchange for Chris Stewart, Kevin Shattenkirk and a conditional second-round pick on February 19, 2011. Later that day, Johnson made his Avalanche debut at the HP Pavilion at San Jose in a 4–0 loss to the San Jose Sharks. In his second game, Johnson faced his former team and posted his first goal as a member of the Avalanche in a 4–3 win. As a result of his goal against St. Louis, Johnson earned the Avalanche "Play of the Week" award. He finished the rest of the season with three goals and seven assists for 10 points through 22 games.

Johnson began the 2011–12 season healthy but was shortly placed on injured reserve in November due to a groin injury. Upon returning to the lineup in January, Johnson extended his assist/point streak to three games and led all Avalanche defensemen with 18 assists. As he remained healthy for the remainder of the season, Johnson finished the season by leading all Colorado defensemen in scoring with 26 points while averaging 20:50 of ice time per game. After signing Johnson to a four-year, $15 million extension, General Manager/Executive Vice President Greg Sherman said: "Since Erik’s arrival in Colorado, he has provided stability, size, and an offensive presence to our blueline...At only 24 years of age, we believe that Erik will continue to grow his game and we are thrilled to have him under contract."

On January 23, 2013, Johnson played in his 300th career NHL game. A few weeks later, it was announced that Johnson would remain out indefinitely after he suffered a head injury in a game against the Phoenix Coyotes. Upon returning to the lineup, Johnson recorded a career-high eight hits against the Dallas Stars, becoming the second Avalanche to reach this milestone since the league began tracking the stat in 2005.

Prior to the conclusion of the 2013–14 offseason, Johnson was told by head coach Patrick Roy to come back with less bulk and less weight. As such, he focused on mobility and agility and dropped 10 pounds. Upon returning for the 2014–15 season, analyst Ray Ferraro praised Johnson for becoming "aggressive without being careless." He continued to produce offensively and led all NHL defensemen with a career-high 12 goals by January. He also ranked first on the Avalanche in goals, average ice time, blocked shots, and power-play goals. As such, he became the first Avalanche defenseman to be selected for the NHL All-Star Game since Rob Blake in 2003-04. However, Johnson did not compete in the All-Star Game nor the final 34 games of the season due to a knee injury. Despite this, Johnson signed a seven-year, $42 million extension with the Avalanche.

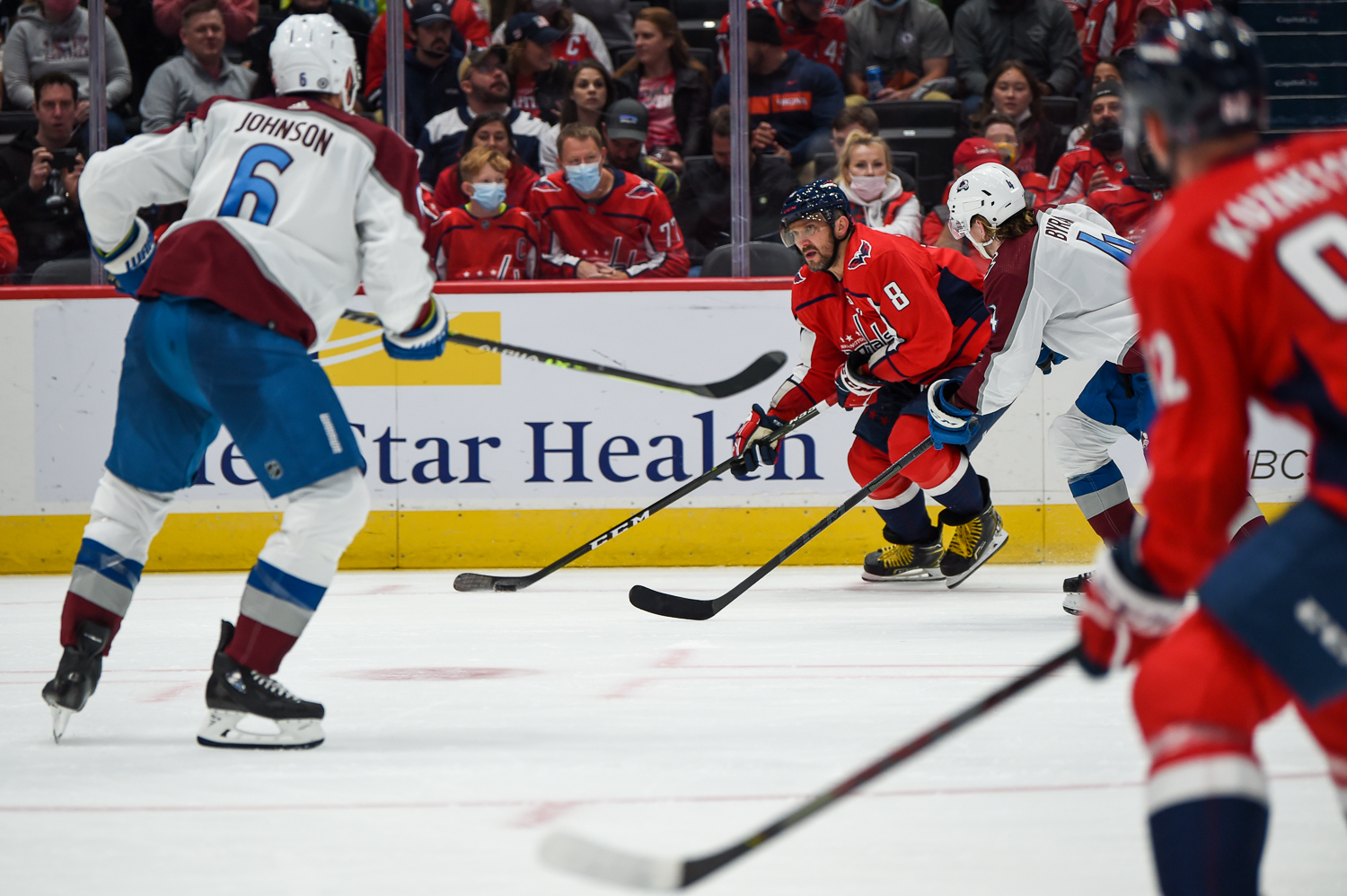
Johnson and Bowen Byram defend against Alexander Ovechkin and Evgeny Kuznetsov in October 2021

Upon recovering from his knee injury, Johnson remained relatively healthy for the 2015–16 season and played in 73 games to reach the 500-game mark. He reached numerous milestones throughout the season including scoring his 50th career goal against the Dallas Stars on October 10, 2015. Nearly a month later, Johnson also reached 200 career points with an assist on François Beauchemin's goal against the Boston Bruins. He finished the regular season with 11 goals and 16 assists for third amongst Avalanche blueliners in scoring with 27 points. This marked the third straight season in which he ended the year as one of the top three scoring defenders on the team.

During the 2017–18 season Johnson played in his 600th NHL game on December 3, 2017, in a 7–2 loss to the Dallas Stars. At the time, Johnson led the team, and was the fifth highest in the league, in average ice time at 26:24 minutes. Johnson was suspended for two games on December 17, 2017, for boarding Tampa Bay Lightning forward Vladislav Namestnikov.

On February 29, 2020, Johnson became the first defenseman from the 2006 draft to reach 300 points, and the 37th United States-born defenseman in NHL history to hit the 300-point mark.

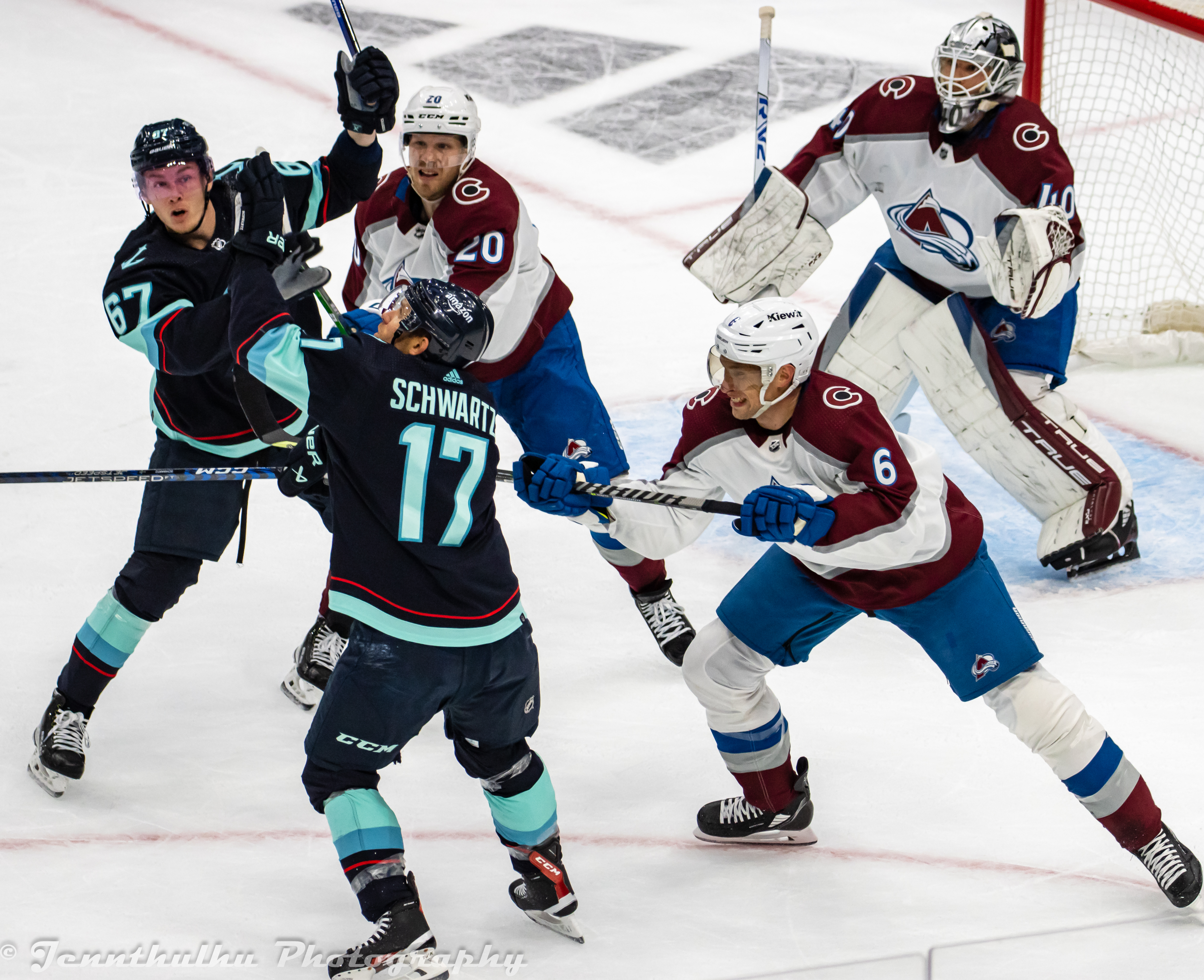
Johnson defending against Jaden Schwartz and Morgan Geekie with teammates Lars Eller and Alexandar Georgiev in April 2023 during the first round of the 2023 Stanley Cup playoffs

Four games into the 2020–21 season, Johnson sustained a concussion after a hit from Minnesota Wild forward Jordan Greenway caused his head to make contact with the ice. He missed the remainder of the regular season, and while he returned to practice during the 2021 Stanley Cup playoffs, Johnson was unable to play before the Avalanche were eliminated in the second round by the Vegas Golden Knights.

With the addition of the Seattle Kraken to the NHL in advance of the 2021–22 season, the 2021 NHL expansion draft was scheduled to be held. Each team had the opportunity to protect only a certain number of players, and Johnson was among the Colorado players contractually guaranteed protection in such a scenario. However, he announced that he would waive his no-movement clause, allowing the Avalanche to protect more of their younger defencemen from being selected. The Kraken did not take Johnson, opting instead for Joonas Donskoi. Due to a bout of COVID-19, Johnson missed the beginning of the season. On October 31, 2021, Johnson scored the game-winning goal of a 4–1 win against the Minnesota Wild to mark his 12th with the team. Upon reaching this milestone, he moved into second place in franchise history in game-winning goals scored by a defenseman. After three consecutive seasons of being eliminated in the second round of the playoffs, in the 2022 playoffs the Avalanche reached the Western Conference Final for the first time since 2002. Facing the Edmonton Oilers, the Avalanche won the series in four games, advancing to the 2022 Stanley Cup Final against the two time defending Stanley Cup champion Tampa Bay Lightning. The Avalanche ultimately defeated the Lightning in six games to win the Stanley Cup championship on June 26, 2022. Johnson was first in line in the cup handoff process, honouring his long tenure with the Avalanche organization.

==== Buffalo Sabres (2023–2024) ====
At the conclusion of the 2022–23 season, Johnson left the Avalanche as a free agent following 13 seasons with the club and was signed to a one-year, $3.25 million contract with the Buffalo Sabres on July 1, 2023. By his own admission, Johnson had a disappointing season with the underperforming Sabres, which he partially attributed to difficulty in adjusting to a new market after spending 13 seasons with the Avalanche, and his age as a veteran defenceman.

==== Philadelphia Flyers (2024–2025) ====
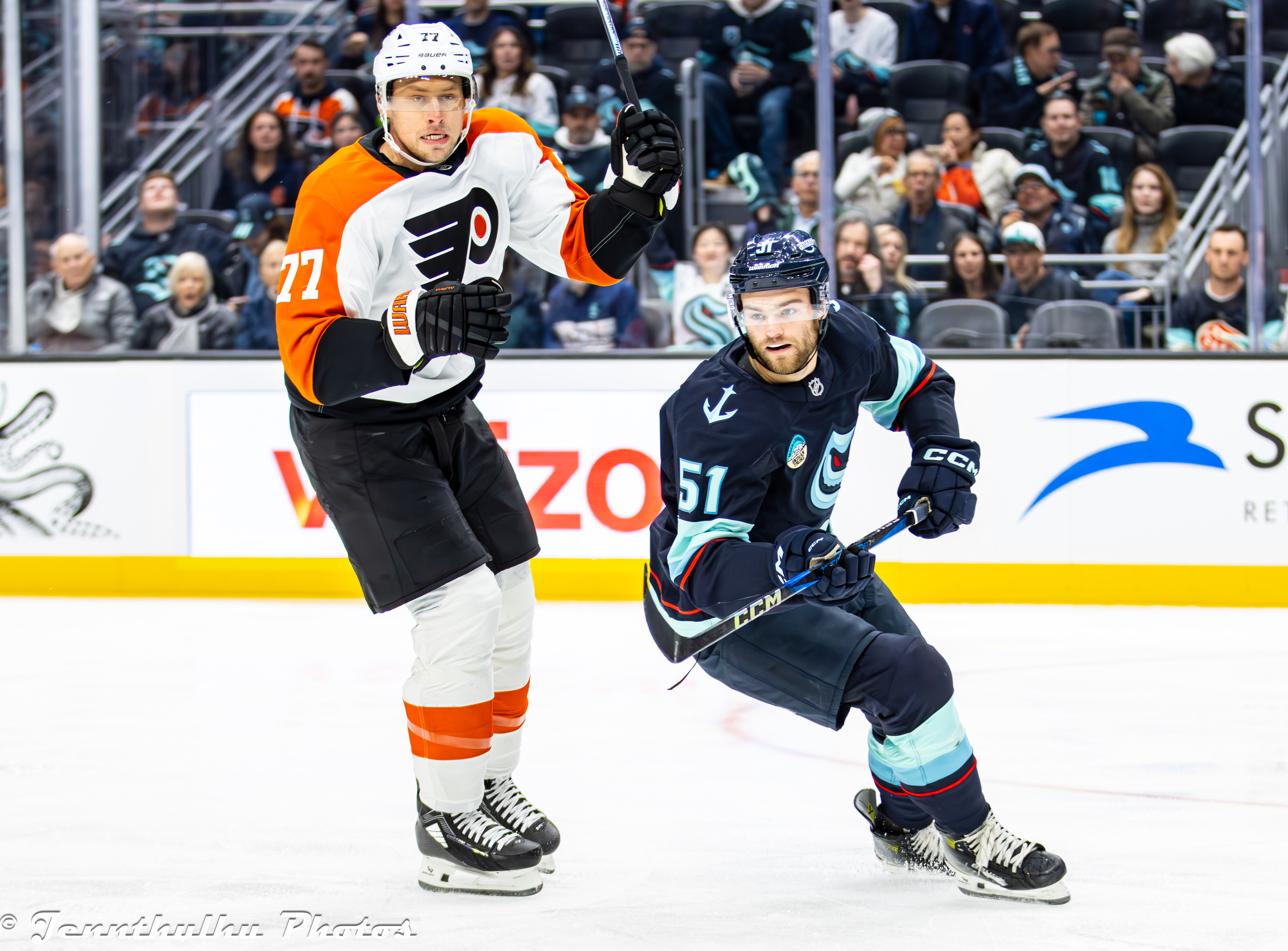
Johnson (left) against with the Philadelphia Flyers in October 2024

On March 8, 2024, with the struggling Sabres out of playoff contention, Johnson was traded to the Philadelphia Flyers in exchange for a 2024 fourth-round pick. The Flyers, who were in the midst of a surprising season where they had exceeded general public expectations, were in the midst of a push for the playoffs, while also dealing with several injuries to their defence at the time of the trade. Ultimately, the Flyers would miss the postseason by five points.

On July 1, after testing the market on the opening day of free agency, Johnson opted to return to the Flyers on a one-year, $1 million contract. Johnson subsequently played his 1,000th NHL game on November 16, becoming just the 25th United States-born defenseman to achieve the milestone, and also just the 403rd player in NHL history and 16th Flyer to reach the mark.

==== Return to Colorado and retirement (2025) ====
On March 7, 2025, at the NHL trade deadline, Johnson was traded back to the Colorado Avalanche in exchange for Givani Smith.

Entering the 2025–26 season, Johnson reportedly had several professional tryout offers from teams other than Colorado; however, he instead opted to announce his retirement from hockey on October 1, 2025.

== International play ==
Medal record

Representing United States

Men's ice hockey

Olympic Games
Silver medal – second place	2010 Vancouver	

World Championships
Bronze medal – third place	2013 Stockholm/Helsinki	

World Junior Championships
Bronze medal – third place	2007 Leksand	

World U18 Championships
Gold medal – first place	2005 České Budějovice	
Gold medal – first place	2006 Halmstad	

As a product of the US NTDP, Johnson first made his international debut for the United States at the 2005 World U17 Hockey Challenge. In the same year, he captured a gold medal as a 17-year-old at the 2005 World Under-18 Championships. Johnson scored ten points in six games the 2006 World Under-18 championships to help the U.S. retain the gold medal, and was selected as the Bob Johnson Award winner as the Best American player in international competition.

Johnson was a member of the U.S. junior team that won a bronze medal in the 2007 World Junior Ice Hockey Championships. He was named to the tournament's All-Star Team and was named the tournament's Best Defenseman. Johnson finished the tournament with four goals and six assists for ten points, becoming the first defenseman to lead the tournament in scoring.

Representing the senior U.S. team at the 2010 Winter Olympics in Vancouver, Johnson received a silver medal after losing in overtime to Canada in the final.

Johnson was chosen to participate in the 2016 World Cup of Hockey for the United States team.

== Personal life ==
Johnson's uncle is Sean Duffy, the United States Secretary of Transportation, a Republican politician, and a former U.S. Representative for Wisconsin's 7th Congressional district.

In addition to his accomplished career as an NHL defenseman, Johnson is a proprietor and commercial racehorse breeder for ERJ Racing, LLC. He refers to his racing business as "my outlet away from hockey and my passion." One of his racehorses, Landeskog, is named after his teammate Gabriel Landeskog.

Johnson is a minority shareholder in the Premier League soccer club Leeds United.

== Career statistics ==
=== Regular season and playoffs ===
			Regular season					Playoffs
Season	Team	League	GP	G	A	Pts	PIM	GP	G	A	Pts	PIM
2002–03	Academy of Holy Angels	HSMN	31	2	9	11	20	—	—	—	—	—
2003–04	Academy of Holy Angels	HSMN	31	13	23	36	26	—	—	—	—	—
2004–05	U.S. NTDP Juniors	NAHL	31	6	6	12	12	—	—	—	—	—
2004–05	U.S. NTDP U17	USDP	26	5	9	14	14	—	—	—	—	—
2004–05	U.S. NTDP U18	USDP	15	1	2	3	4	—	—	—	—	—
2005–06	U.S. NTDP U18	USDP	36	12	22	34	78	—	—	—	—	—
2005–06	U.S. NTDP U18	NAHL	11	4	11	15	10	—	—	—	—	—
2006–07	University of Minnesota	WCHA	41	4	20	24	50	—	—	—	—	—
2007–08	St. Louis Blues	NHL	69	5	28	33	30	—	—	—	—	—
2007–08	Peoria Rivermen	AHL	1	0	0	0	2	—	—	—	—	—
2009–10	St. Louis Blues	NHL	79	10	29	39	79	—	—	—	—	—
2010–11	St. Louis Blues	NHL	55	5	14	19	37	—	—	—	—	—
2010–11	Colorado Avalanche	NHL	22	3	7	10	19	—	—	—	—	—
2011–12	Colorado Avalanche	NHL	73	4	22	26	26	—	—	—	—	—
2012–13	Colorado Avalanche	NHL	31	0	4	4	18	—	—	—	—	—
2013–14	Colorado Avalanche	NHL	80	9	30	39	61	7	1	1	2	2
2014–15	Colorado Avalanche	NHL	47	12	11	23	33	—	—	—	—	—
2015–16	Colorado Avalanche	NHL	73	11	16	27	50	—	—	—	—	—
2016–17	Colorado Avalanche	NHL	46	2	15	17	9	—	—	—	—	—
2017–18	Colorado Avalanche	NHL	62	9	16	25	58	—	—	—	—	—
2018–19	Colorado Avalanche	NHL	80	7	18	25	38	12	2	1	3	4
2019–20	Colorado Avalanche	NHL	59	3	13	16	20	9	0	2	2	0
2020–21	Colorado Avalanche	NHL	4	0	1	1	2	—	—	—	—	—
2021–22	Colorado Avalanche	NHL	77	8	17	25	24	20	1	4	5	4
2022–23	Colorado Avalanche	NHL	63	0	8	8	12	7	1	0	1	0
2023–24	Buffalo Sabres	NHL	50	3	0	3	24	—	—	—	—	—
2023–24	Philadelphia Flyers	NHL	17	2	1	3	2	—	—	—	—	—
2024–25	Philadelphia Flyers	NHL	22	1	2	3	11	—	—	—	—	—
2024–25	Colorado Avalanche	NHL	14	1	1	2	4	2	0	0	0	0
NHL totals			1,023	95	253	348	555	57	5	8	13	10

=== International ===
Year	Team	Event	Result	GP	G	A	Pts	PIM
2005	United States	U17	5th	5	2	0	2	4
2005	United States	WJC18	1st place, gold medalist(s)	6	0	0	0	0
2006	United States	WJC	4th	7	1	3	4	18
2006	United States	WJC18	1st place, gold medalist(s)	6	4	6	10	27
2007	United States	WJC	3rd place, bronze medalist(s)	7	4	6	10	16
2007	United States	WC	5th	7	0	2	2	4
2010	United States	OG	2nd place, silver medalist(s)	6	1	0	1	4
2013	United States	WC	3rd place, bronze medalist(s)	10	2	2	4	20
2016	United States	WCH	7th	2	0	0	0	2
Junior totals				31	11	15	26	65
Senior totals				25	3	4	7	30

== Awards and honors ==
Award	Year	Ref
College
WCHA Rookie Team	2007	
NHL
NHL YoungStars Game	2008	
NHL All-Star Game	2015	
Stanley Cup champion	2022	
International
WJC Best Defenseman Directorate Award	2007	
WJC All-Star Team	2007	

Awards and achievements
Preceded by Sidney Crosby	NHL first overall draft pick 2006	Succeeded by Patrick Kane
Preceded by T. J. Oshie	St. Louis Blues first-round draft pick 2006	Succeeded by Patrik Berglund
Preceded by Marc Staal	World Junior Best Defenceman; 2007	Succeeded by Drew Doughty
