= Denis Bodrov =

Russian ice hockey player (born 1986)

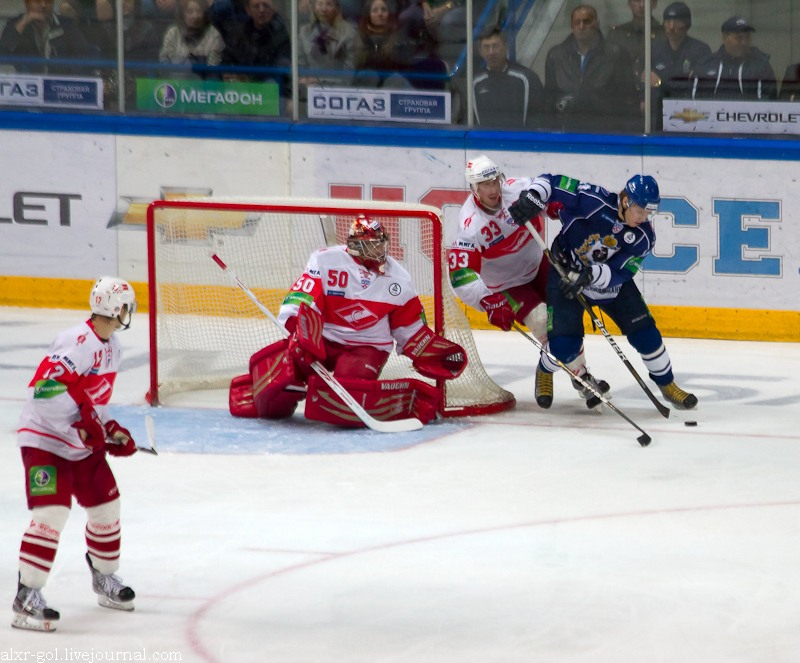
- Born: August 22, 1986 (age 39) Moscow, USSR
- Height: 6 ft 1 in (185 cm)
- Weight: 205 lb (93 kg; 14 st 9 lb)
- Position: Defense
- Shoots: Left
- KHL team Former teams: Free Agent; Lada Togliatti; Atlant Moscow Oblast; Spartak Moscow; Salavat Yulaev Ufa; Avtomobilist Yekaterinburg; Traktor Chelyabinsk; Sibir Novosibirsk
- NHL draft: 55th overall, 2006; Philadelphia Flyers
- Playing career: 2005–present

Denis Bodrov (born August 22, 1986) is a former Russian professional ice hockey defenseman. He most recently played for HC Sibir Novosibirsk of the Kontinental Hockey League (KHL).

== Playing career ==
Bodrov was drafted by the Philadelphia Flyers in the second round, 55th overall, of the 2006 NHL entry draft. He played three seasons for Lada Togliatti in the Russian Superleague and split the 2008–09 KHL season with Lada Togliatti and Atlant Moscow Oblast.

After three seasons with Salavat Yulaev Ufa, Bodrov left as a free agent and signed a two-year contract with Avtomobilist Yekaterinburg prior to the 2017–18 season, on May 8, 2017.

In the midst of his fourth year with Avtomobilist during the 2020–21 season, Bodrov left the club after 12 games and signed for the remainder of the year with Traktor Chelyabinsk on 17 December 2020.

After concluding his contract with Traktor, Bodrov left as a free agent in the off-season, securing a one-year contract with HC Sibir Novosibirsk on 11 May 2021.

== Career statistics ==
=== Regular season and playoffs ===
			Regular season					Playoffs
Season	Team	League	GP	G	A	Pts	PIM	GP	G	A	Pts	PIM
2001–02	Lada–2 Togliatti	RUS.3	2	0	0	0	0	—	—	—	—	—
2002–03	Lada–2 Togliatti	RUS.3	21	0	0	0	6	—	—	—	—	—
2003–04	Lada–2 Togliatti	RUS.3	46	3	4	7	58	—	—	—	—	—
2004–05	Lada–2 Togliatti	RUS.3	24	1	5	6	50	—	—	—	—	—
2004–05	CSK VVS Samara	RUS.2	33	1	6	7	57	—	—	—	—	—
2004–05	CSK VVS–2 Samara	RUS.3	1	0	0	0	0	—	—	—	—	—
2005–06	Lada Togliatti	RSL	35	2	2	4	42	8	0	0	0	8
2006–07	Lada Togliatti	RSL	49	1	5	6	70	3	0	1	1	6
2006–07	Lada–2 Togliatti	RUS.3	7	3	4	7	14	—	—	—	—	—
2007–08	Lada Togliatti	RSL	46	2	9	11	74	4	1	0	1	2
2007–08	Lada–2 Togliatti	RUS.3	8	3	4	7	38	—	—	—	—	—
2008–09	Lada Togliatti	KHL	24	1	5	6	20	—	—	—	—	—
2008–09	Atlant Moscow Oblast	KHL	21	1	4	5	24	4	0	1	1	0
2009–10	Atlant Moscow Oblast	KHL	12	1	0	1	6	—	—	—	—	—
2009–10	Adirondack Phantoms	AHL	17	1	3	4	6	—	—	—	—	—
2010–11	Spartak Moscow	KHL	45	3	8	11	46	4	0	2	2	4
2011–12	Spartak Moscow	KHL	53	6	14	20	32	—	—	—	—	—
2012–13	Spartak Moscow	KHL	38	4	12	16	29	—	—	—	—	—
2013–14	Spartak Moscow	KHL	54	3	15	18	30	—	—	—	—	—
2014–15	Salavat Yulaev Ufa	KHL	43	1	4	5	57	5	0	0	0	4
2015–16	Salavat Yulaev Ufa	KHL	50	1	8	9	40	9	1	2	3	6
2016–17	Salavat Yulaev Ufa	KHL	37	1	2	3	93	5	0	0	0	2
2017–18	Avtomobilist Yekaterinburg	KHL	2	0	0	0	0	—	—	—	—	—
2018–19	Avtomobilist Yekaterinburg	KHL	48	3	11	14	32	7	1	0	1	12
2019–20	Avtomobilist Yekaterinburg	KHL	50	2	9	11	45	2	0	1	1	6
2020–21	Avtomobilist Yekaterinburg	KHL	12	2	1	3	18	—	—	—	—	—
2020–21	Traktor Chelyabinsk	KHL	22	2	1	3	16	5	0	1	1	0
2021–22	Sibir Novosibirsk	KHL	30	2	3	5	20	5	0	0	0	2
RSL totals			130	5	16	21	186	15	1	1	2	16
KHL totals			541	33	97	130	508	46	2	7	9	36

=== International ===
Year	Team	Event	Result	GP	G	A	Pts	PIM
2006	Russia	WJC	2nd place, silver medalist(s)	6	0	3	3	2
Junior totals				6	0	3	3	2
