= Dmitri Kazionov =

Russian ice hockey player

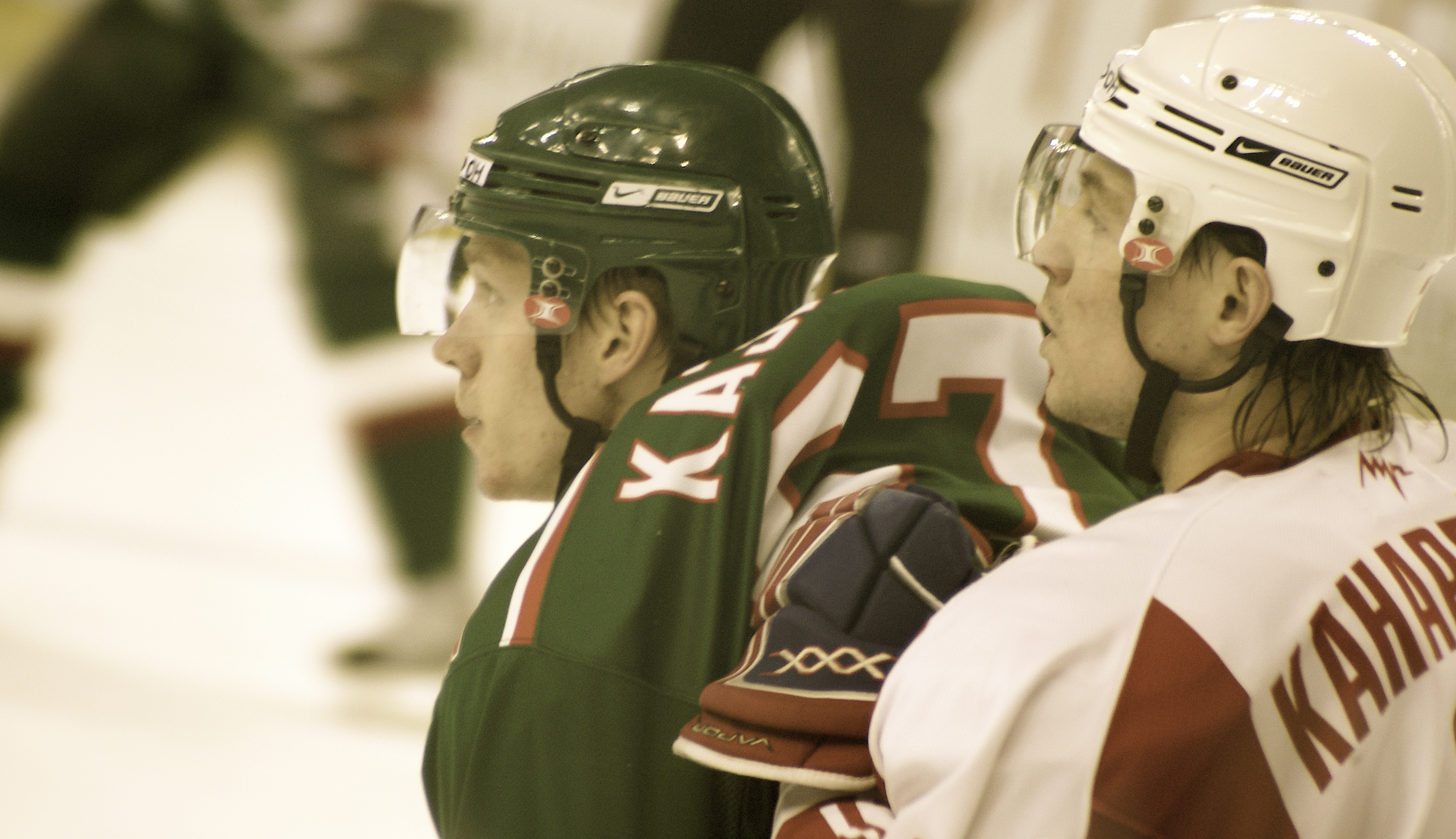
- Born: May 13, 1984
- Height: 6 ft 4 in (193 cm)
- Weight: 184 lb (83 kg; 13 st 2 lb)
- Position: Centre
- Shot: Left
- KHL team Former teams: Free Agent; HC Lada Togliatti; Ak Bars Kazan; Metallurg Magnitogorsk; Torpedo Nizhny Novgorod; HC Sochi; Dynamo Moscow; Severstal Cherepovets
- NHL draft: 100th overall, 2002; Tampa Bay Lightning
- Playing career: 2002–2019

Dmitri Aleksandrovich Kazionov (Russian: Дмитрий Александрович Казионов; born May 13, 1984) is a Russian professional ice hockey forward. He currently playing on a tryout for HC Neftekhimik Nizhnekamsk of the Kontinental Hockey League (KHL). Kazionov was selected by Tampa Bay Lightning in the 4th round (100th overall) of the 2002 NHL entry draft. He formerly played alongside younger brother and fellow former Tampa Bay draft pick Denis in Metallurg Magnitogorsk.

Kazionov made his Kontinental Hockey League debut playing with Ak Bars Kazan during the inaugural 2008–09 KHL season.

== Career statistics ==
=== Regular season and playoffs ===
| | | | Regular season | | | | | Playoffs |
| Season | Team | League | GP | G | A | Pts | PIM | GP | G | A | Pts | PIM |
|---|---|---|---|---|---|---|---|---|---|---|---|---|
| 1999–2000 | Dynamo–2 Moscow | RUS.3 | 2 | 1 | 0 | 1 | 0 | — | — | — | — | — |
| 2000–01 | Dynamo–2 Moscow | RUS.3 | 6 | 0 | 1 | 1 | 4 | — | — | — | — | — |
| 2000–01 | THK Tver | RUS.2 | 33 | 1 | 1 | 2 | 4 | — | — | — | — | — |
| 2001–02 | CSKA Moscow | RUS.2 | 2 | 0 | 1 | 1 | 0 | — | — | — | — | — |
| 2001–02 | CSKA–2 Moscow | RUS.3 | 11 | 1 | 1 | 2 | 4 | — | — | — | — | — |
| 2001–02 | Lada Togliatti | RSL | 3 | 0 | 0 | 0 | 0 | — | — | — | — | — |
| 2001–02 | Lada–2 Togliatti | RUS.3 | 21 | 7 | 8 | 15 | 24 | — | — | — | — | — |
| 2002–03 | Lada Togliatti | RSL | 5 | 0 | 1 | 1 | 4 | — | — | — | — | — |
| 2002–03 | Lada–2 Togliatti | RUS.3 | 34 | 11 | 10 | 21 | 26 | — | — | — | — | — |
| 2003–04 | Lada Togliatti | RSL | 47 | 5 | 5 | 10 | 34 | 5 | 0 | 0 | 0 | 4 |
| 2003–04 | Lada–2 Togliatti | RUS.3 | 13 | 5 | 3 | 8 | 0 | — | — | — | — | — |
| 2004–05 | Lada Togliatti | RSL | 46 | 3 | 7 | 10 | 32 | 2 | 0 | 0 | 0 | 0 |
| 2004–05 | Lada–2 Togliatti | RUS.3 | 9 | 1 | 6 | 7 | 22 | — | — | — | — | — |
| 2005–06 | Lada Togliatti | RSL | 13 | 0 | 3 | 3 | 18 | — | — | — | — | — |
| 2005–06 | Dynamo Moscow | RSL | 27 | 2 | 2 | 4 | 24 | 4 | 1 | 0 | 1 | 6 |
| 2006–07 | Ak Bars Kazan | RSL | 48 | 10 | 11 | 21 | 34 | 13 | 2 | 3 | 5 | 4 |
| 2006–07 | Ak Bars–2 Kazan | RUS.3 | 1 | 0 | 0 | 0 | 0 | — | — | — | — | — |
| 2007–08 | Ak Bars Kazan | RSL | 56 | 7 | 13 | 20 | 46 | 10 | 0 | 3 | 3 | 16 |
| 2007–08 | Ak Bars–2 Kazan | RUS.3 | 2 | 1 | 2 | 3 | 4 | — | — | — | — | — |
| 2008–09 | Ak Bars Kazan | KHL | 55 | 9 | 11 | 20 | 30 | 21 | 2 | 6 | 8 | 12 |
| 2009–10 | Ak Bars Kazan | KHL | 52 | 18 | 9 | 27 | 18 | 22 | 3 | 5 | 8 | 12 |
| 2010–11 | Ak Bars Kazan | KHL | 44 | 2 | 5 | 7 | 32 | 5 | 0 | 0 | 0 | 4 |
| 2011–12 | Ak Bars Kazan | KHL | 13 | 1 | 2 | 3 | 10 | — | — | — | — | — |
| 2011–12 | Metallurg Magnitogorsk | KHL | 30 | 4 | 3 | 7 | 16 | 10 | 0 | 0 | 0 | 8 |
| 2012–13 | Metallurg Magnitogorsk | KHL | 52 | 16 | 8 | 24 | 36 | 7 | 1 | 0 | 1 | 2 |
| 2013–14 | Metallurg Magnitogorsk | KHL | 48 | 1 | 7 | 8 | 22 | 19 | 1 | 2 | 3 | 20 |
| 2014–15 | Torpedo Nizhny Novgorod | KHL | 52 | 2 | 9 | 11 | 81 | 5 | 0 | 1 | 1 | 6 |
| 2015–16 | HC Sochi | KHL | 55 | 2 | 8 | 10 | 67 | 4 | 0 | 1 | 1 | 4 |
| 2016–17 | Metallurg Magnitogorsk | KHL | 53 | 1 | 8 | 9 | 59 | 5 | 0 | 0 | 0 | 2 |
| 2017–18 | Dynamo Moscow | KHL | 47 | 2 | 5 | 7 | 40 | — | — | — | — | — |
| 2018–19 | Severstal Cherepovets | KHL | 2 | 0 | 0 | 0 | 4 | — | — | — | — | — |
| RSL totals | | | 245 | 27 | 42 | 69 | 192 | 34 | 3 | 6 | 9 | 30 |
| KHL totals | | | 509 | 58 | 75 | 133 | 415 | 98 | 7 | 15 | 22 | 70 |

=== International ===
| Year | Team | Event | GP | G | A | Pts | PIM |
|---|---|---|---|---|---|---|---|
| 2001 | Russia | U17 | 5 | 0 | 3 | 3 | 0 |
| 2001 | Russia | U18 | 5 | 0 | 2 | 2 | 2 |
| 2002 | Russia | WJC18 | 1 | 0 | 0 | 0 | 0 |
| 2004 | Russia | WJC | 6 | 1 | 1 | 2 | 2 |
| Junior totals | | | 17 | 1 | 6 | 7 | 4 |
