= Kirill Tulupov =

Russian ice hockey player (born 1988)

- Born: April 23, 1988 (age 38) Khmelnitsky, Soviet Union
- Height: 6 ft 4 in (193 cm)
- Weight: 230 lb (104 kg; 16 st 6 lb)
- Position: Defence
- Shot: Right
- Played for: HC Slovan Bratislava; HC Spartak Moscow; Oklahoma City Barons; Avtomobilist Yekaterinburg; Amur Khabarovsk; Frederikshavn White Hawks; HC Vityaz; HPK
- NHL draft: 67th overall, 2006; New Jersey Devils
- Playing career: 2005–2016

Kirill Tulupov (born April 23, 1988) is a Russian former professional ice hockey player who last played under contract with HPK of the Finnish Liiga. He ended his career in October 2016.

== Playing career ==
Tulupov played in his native Russia before taking his game to Canada. He appeared in 172 games in the Quebec Major Junior Hockey League (QMJHL) with the Chicoutimi Saguenéens and Victoriaville Tigres between 2006 and 2009. He spent the 2009–10 season in Slovakia, turning out for HC Slovan Bratislava. In 2010–11, he had a brief stint at KHL side Spartak Moskva and also played in the VHL as well as in Kazakhstan.

In 2011, Tulupov returned to North America, joining the Oklahoma City Barons of the American Hockey League (AHL). He made 33 AHL appearances for the team, before splitting the 2012–13 season between the KHL (representing Avtomobilist Yekaterinburg and Amur Khabarovsk) and the CHL (playing for the Arizona Sundogs). In 2013–14, Tulupov made 33 ECHL appearances for the Gwinnett Gladiators and later signed with the Frederikshavn White Hawks of Denmark.

He continued his hockey journey at KHL's Vityaz Podolsk, where he had a short stint during the 2014-15 campaign, before being snapped up by ECHL's Wichita Thunder.

After he was traded by the ECHL Orlando Solar Bears, to the Rapid City Rush, Tulupov was later re-signed to a one-year contract for the following season on July 2, 2015. Tulupov appeared in the opening game of the 2015–16 season with the Rush, recording an assist, before he was released by the club on October 21, 2015.

In April 2016, he joined HPK of the Finnish top-flight Liiga.

== Career statistics ==
=== Regular season and playoffs ===
			Regular season					Playoffs
Season	Team	League	GP	G	A	Pts	PIM	GP	G	A	Pts	PIM
2005–06	Toronto Rattlers			16	28	44		—	—	—	—	—
2005–06	Neftyanik Leninogorsk	RUS.2	8	1	1	2	14	3	0	2	2	8
2006–07	Chicoutimi Saguenéens	QMJHL	54	8	20	28	88	2	1	1	2	2
2007–08	Chicoutimi Saguenéens	QMJHL	14	2	2	4	15	—	—	—	—	—
2007–08	Victoriaville Tigres	QMJHL	45	0	11	11	61	5	0	0	0	4
2008–09	Victoriaville Tigres	QMJHL	59	5	16	21	32	—	—	—	—	—
2009–10	HC Slovan Bratislava	SVK	45	1	7	8	30	14	1	0	1	2
2010–11	Spartak Moscow	KHL	4	0	0	0	8	—	—	—	—	—
2010–11	Krylia Sovetov Moscow	VHL	9	1	1	2	18	—	—	—	—	—
2010–11	Molot–Prikamie Perm	VHL	7	0	1	1	6	—	—	—	—	—
2010–11	Saryarka Karagandy	KAZ	6	0	1	1	10	7	0	0	0	29
2011–12	Oklahoma City Barons	AHL	33	1	7	8	71	—	—	—	—	—
2012–13	Avtomobilist Yekaterinburg	KHL	3	0	0	0	0	—	—	—	—	—
2012–13	Amur Khabarovsk	KHL	16	0	2	2	10	—	—	—	—	—
2012–13	Arizona Sundogs	CHL	15	3	1	4	4	4	0	1	1	6
2013–14	Gwinnett Gladiators	ECHL	33	0	3	3	14	—	—	—	—	—
2013–14	Frederikshavn White Hawks	DEN	2	0	0	0	0	10	3	1	4	57
2014–15	Vityaz Podolsk	KHL	1	0	1	1	4	—	—	—	—	—
2014–15	Wichita Thunder	ECHL	63	7	14	21	85	—	—	—	—	—
2015–16	Rapid City Rush	ECHL	1	0	1	1	0	—	—	—	—	—
2015–16	Rivière–du–Loup 3L	LNAH	9	1	5	6	13	8	2	2	4	12
2016–17	HPK	Liiga	7	0	1	1	2	—	—	—	—	—
KHL totals			24	0	3	3	22	—	—	—	—	—
ECHL totals			97	7	18	25	99	—	—	—	—	—

=== International ===
Year	Team	Event	Result	GP	G	A	Pts	PIM
2006	Russia	WJC18	5th	6	0	2	2	8
Junior totals				6	0	2	2	8
