= Ondřej Fiala =

Czech ice hockey player (born 1987)

- Born: 4 November 1987 (age 38) Šternberk, Czechoslovakia
- Height: 6 ft 02 in (188 cm)
- Weight: 190 lb (86 kg; 13 st 8 lb)
- Position: Left wing
- Shot: Left
- Played for: HC Oceláři Třinec; HC Spartak Moscow; Orli Znojmo
- NHL draft: 40th overall, 2006; Minnesota Wild
- Playing career: 2008–2018

Ondřej Fiala (born 4 November 1987, Šternberk) is a Czech former professional ice hockey player, who most notably played for Orli Znojmo in the Austrian Hockey League (EBEL).

== Playing career ==
After playing in the Czech league he went to North America and played in the Western Hockey League for three years with the Everett Silvertips and the Saskatoon Blades. Fiala was selected 40th overall in the second round of the 2006 NHL entry draft by the Minnesota Wild. Fiala featured in his native Czech Republic, with HC Oceláři Třinec in the Czech Extraliga and also endured a short stint in the Russian Kontinental Hockey League with HC Spartak Moscow.

On April 28, 2012, Fiala left KLH Chomutov of the 1. národní hokejová liga and joined Czech based, Orli Znojmo of the EBEL.

== Career statistics ==
=== Regular season and playoffs ===
			Regular season					Playoffs
Season	Team	League	GP	G	A	Pts	PIM	GP	G	A	Pts	PIM
2000–01	HC MBL Olomouc	CZE U18	6	1	2	3	2	1	0	0	0	0
2001–02	HC Havířov Panthers	CZE U18	16	6	9	15	8	—	—	—	—	—
2001–02	HC Oceláři Třinec	CZE U18	27	6	12	18	16	6	2	2	4	2
2002–03	HC Oceláři Třinec	CZE U18	40	26	30	56	58	2	1	1	2	2
2002–03	HC Oceláři Třinec	CZE U20	2	0	0	0	0	6	1	0	1	2
2003–04	HC Oceláři Třinec	CZE U18	3	1	0	1	4	2	1	0	1	0
2003–04	HC Oceláři Třinec	CZE U20	28	9	7	16	16	2	0	0	0	0
2004–05	HC Oceláři Třinec	CZE U20	3	1	0	1	4	2	1	0	1	0
2004–05	HC Oceláři Třinec	ELH	3	0	0	0	0	—	—	—	—	—
2004–05	HC Rabat Kladno	CZE U20	11	3	5	8	12	10	2	3	5	7
2005–06	Everett Silvertips	WHL	51	21	14	35	26	8	4	4	8	4
2006–07	Everett Silvertips	WHL	39	12	21	33	26	—	—	—	—	—
2007–08	Everett Silvertips	WHL	3	0	1	1	2	—	—	—	—	—
2007–08	Saskatoon Blades	WHL	58	20	32	52	54	—	—	—	—	—
2008–09	Spartak Moscow	KHL	2	0	1	1	0	—	—	—	—	—
2008–09	Molot–Prikamye Perm	RUS.2	56	12	7	19	36	9	0	3	3	8
2009–10	KLH Chomutov	CZE.2	28	5	3	8	24	—	—	—	—	—
2009–10	SK Kadaň	CZE.2	5	1	0	1	2	—	—	—	—	—
2009–10	HC Děčín	CZE.3	6	3	1	4	31	3	0	1	1	0
2010–11	SK Kadaň	CZE.2	25	3	5	8	18	4	1	1	2	2
2011–12	Piráti Chomutov	CZE.2	18	2	2	4	14	8	0	2	2	33
2011–12	SK Kadaň	CZE.2	23	13	10	23	28	—	—	—	—	—
2012–13	Orli Znojmo	AUT	48	10	18	28	36	5	1	4	5	2
2013–14	Orli Znojmo	AUT	48	13	20	33	42	5	2	0	2	8
2014–15	Orli Znojmo	AUT	49	8	10	18	26	5	3	0	3	2
2015–16	Orli Znojmo	AUT	29	4	12	16	18	15	0	4	4	16
2016–17	LHK Jestřábi Prostějov	CZE.2	32	7	3	10	20	4	0	0	0	2
2017–18	LHK Jestřábi Prostějov	CZE.2	44	3	10	13	26	6	0	0	0	6
CZE.2 totals			175	34	33	67	132	22	1	3	4	43
AUT totals			174	35	60	95	122	30	6	8	14	28

=== International ===
Year	Team	Event	Result	GP	G	A	Pts	PIM
2005	Czech Republic	WJC18	4th	7	2	1	3	8
Junior totals				7	2	1	3	8
