= Denis Kazionov =

Russian ice hockey player

- Born: 8 December 1987 (age 38) Perm, Russian SFSR, Soviet Union
- Height: 6 ft 2 in (188 cm)
- Weight: 212 lb (96 kg; 15 st 2 lb)
- Position: Left wing
- Shot: Left
- Played for: HK MVD; Metallurg Novokuznetsk; Avangard Omsk; Amur Khabarovsk; BK Mladá Boleslav; Avtomobilist Yekaterinburg; HC Traktor Chelyabinsk; Severstal Cherepovets; Torpedo Nizhny Novgorod; HC Sochi; Metallurg Magnitogorsk; HC Dinamo Minsk; Neftekhimik Nizhnekamsk
- NHL draft: 198th overall, 2006; Tampa Bay Lightning
- Playing career: 2005–2020

Denis Aleksandrovich Kazionov (Russian: Денис Александрович Казионов; born 8 December 1987) is a Russian former professional ice hockey winger. His career, which lasted from 2003 to 2020, was mainly spent in the Kontinental Hockey League. His brother Dmitri also played professionally.

He was selected by the Tampa Bay Lightning in the 7th round (198th overall) of the 2006 NHL entry draft.

== Career statistics ==
			Regular season					Playoffs
Season	Team	League	GP	G	A	Pts	PIM	GP	G	A	Pts	PIM
2003–04	CSKA–2 Moscow	RUS.3	2	0	1	1	2	—	—	—	—	—
2004–05	Dynamo–2 Moscow	RUS.3	40	2	9	11	16	—	—	—	—	—
2005–06	HC MVD	RSL	26	0	0	0	12	3	0	0	0	0
2005–06	HC MVD–HK Tver	RUS.3	31	4	13	17	34	—	—	—	—	—
2006–07	HC MVD	RSL	24	2	0	2	8	2	0	0	0	2
2006–07	HC–2 MVD	RUS.4	13	21	16	37	28	—	—	—	—	—
2007–08	Metallurg Novokuznetsk	RSL	8	0	0	0	8	—	—	—	—	—
2007–08	Metallurg–2 Novokuznetsk	RUS.3	5	3	1	4	14	—	—	—	—	—
2007–08	Avangard Omsk	RSL	18	0	0	0	4	3	0	0	0	6
2007–08	Avangard–2 Omsk	RUS.3	13	10	6	16	18	—	—	—	—	—
2008–09	Amur Khabarovsk	KHL	6	0	0	0	6	—	—	—	—	—
2008–09	Amur–2 Khabarovsk	RUS.3	1	0	1	1	0	—	—	—	—	—
2008–09	BK Mladá Boleslav	KHL	24	3	4	7	95	—	—	—	—	—
2009–10	Avtomobilist Yekaterinburg	KHL	51	5	4	9	20	4	0	0	0	6
2010–11	Metallurg Novokuznetsk	KHL	4	0	1	1	29	—	—	—	—	—
2010–11	Traktor Chelyabinsk	KHL	3	0	0	0	0	—	—	—	—	—
2010–11	Izhstal Izhevsk	VHL	33	10	7	17	48	—	—	—	—	—
2011–12	Avtomobilist Yekaterinburg	KHL	47	3	6	9	81	—	—	—	—	—
2011–12	Sputnik Nizhny Tagil	VHL	3	1	0	1	4	—	—	—	—	—
2012–13	Severstal Cherepovets	KHL	45	14	8	22	30	9	2	1	3	56
2013–14	Avangard Omsk	KHL	38	5	4	9	41	—	—	—	—	—
2014–15	Torpedo Nizhny Novgorod	KHL	48	5	3	8	44	5	0	0	0	4
2015–16	HC Sochi	KHL	50	13	8	21	94	4	1	0	1	8
2016–17	Metallurg Magnitogorsk	KHL	57	9	7	16	90	13	1	2	3	16
2017–18	Metallurg Magnitogorsk	KHL	46	7	5	12	40	11	0	0	0	6
2018–19	Dinamo Minsk	KHL	29	5	3	8	28	—	—	—	—	—
2018–19	Shakhtyor Soligorsk	BLR	2	0	0	0	2	—	—	—	—	—
2018–19	Avtomobilist Yekaterinburg	KHL	19	4	4	8	8	6	0	0	0	16
2019–20	Neftekhimik Nizhnekamsk	KHL	41	4	5	9	20	—	—	—	—	—
RSL totals			76	2	0	2	32	8	0	0	0	8
KHL totals			484	74	58	132	531	52	4	3	7	112
