= Jonas Ahnelöv =

Swedish ice hockey player (born 1987)

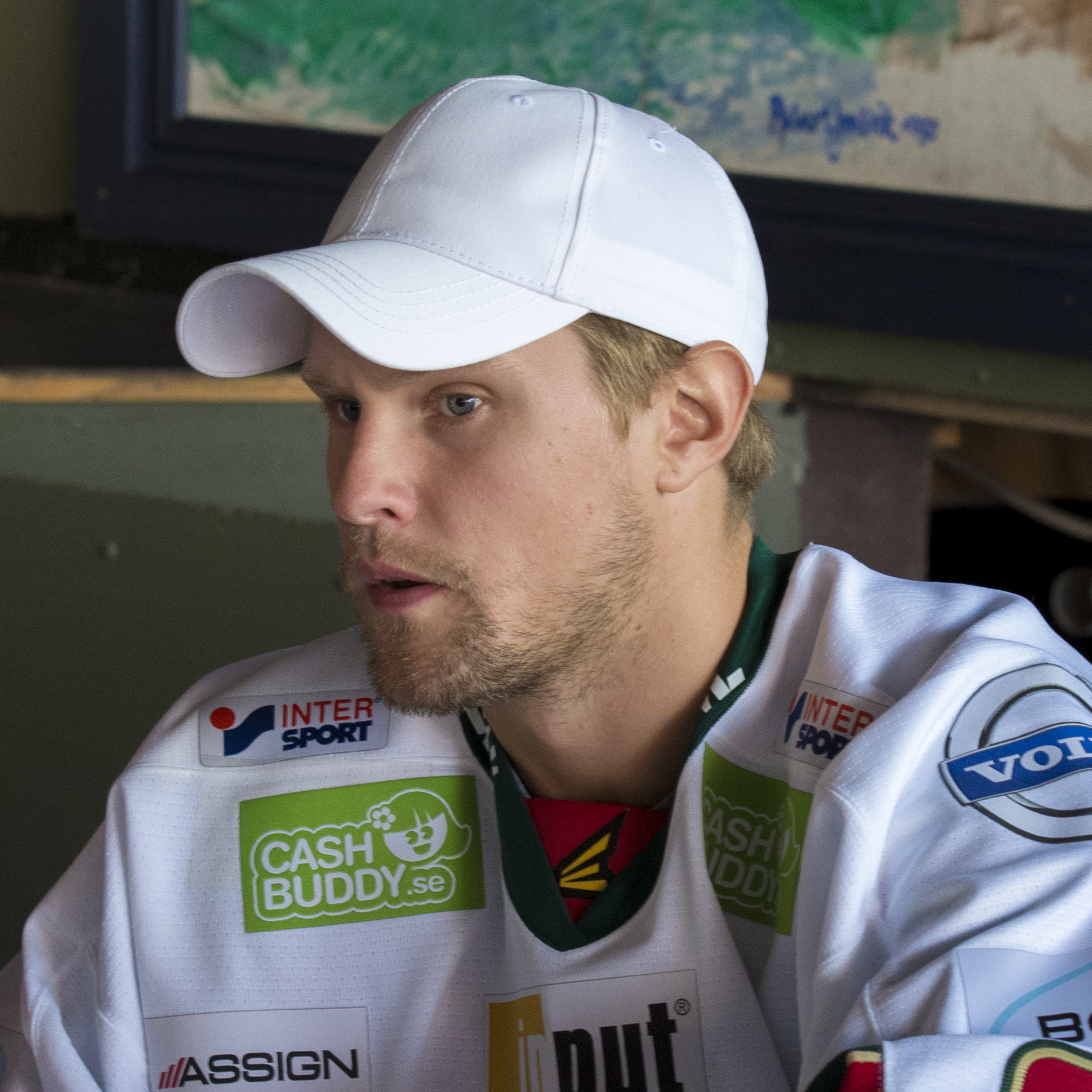
- Born: 11 December 1987 (age 38) Huddinge, Sweden
- Height: 6 ft 2 in (188 cm)
- Weight: 220 lb (100 kg; 15 st 10 lb)
- Position: Defence
- Shoots: Left
- Allsvenskan team Former teams: Södertälje SK; Frölunda HC; San Antonio Rampage; Modo Hockey; Avangard Omsk; Rögle BK; Leksands IF; HC Slovan Bratislava
- National team: Sweden
- NHL draft: 88th overall, 2006; Phoenix Coyotes
- Playing career: 2005–present

Jonas Peter Ahnelöv (born 11 December 1987) is a Swedish professional ice hockey defenceman who plays for Södertälje SK of HockeyAllsvenskan. He was originally selected by the Phoenix Coyotes, 88th overall, in the 2006 NHL entry draft.

== Playing career ==
After his entry-level contract with the Coyotes concluded, Ahnelöv returned to the Swedish Hockey League with Modo Hockey. He later re-joined for his second stint with Modo Hockey from Frölunda HC on 29 April 2014.

On 20 May 2015, Ahnelöv signed a lucrative one-year contract with Russian club, Avangard Omsk of the KHL. After his first year in the KHL, he extended for another two-year contract with Avangard.

At the conclusion of his three-year tenure with Avangard, Ahnelöv opted to return to his native Sweden, securing a one-year deal with Rögle BK for the 2018–19 season on 6 September 2018. In his lone season with Rögle, Ahnelöv contributed with 3 goals and 7 points in 39 games from the blueline.

On 1 May 2019, Ahnelöv continued in Sweden, signing as a free agent on a two-year contract with newly promoted Leksands IF.

== International play ==
Ahnelöv played for Team Sweden at the 2007 World Junior Ice Hockey Championships in Mora and Leksand, Sweden. He also represented his country at the 2014 and 2015 World Championship in Minsk and the Czech Republic and the 2018 Olympic Games.

== Career statistics ==
=== Regular season and playoffs ===
			Regular season					Playoffs
Season	Team	League	GP	G	A	Pts	PIM	GP	G	A	Pts	PIM
2003–04	Huddinge IK	J18 Allsv	6	0	3	3	8	—	—	—	—	—
2003–04	Huddinge IK	J20	9	0	1	1	6	—	—	—	—	—
2004–05	Huddinge IK	J18 Allsv	2	0	0	0	2	—	—	—	—	—
2004–05	Huddinge IK	J20	29	3	3	6	94	3	0	0	0	2
2005–06	Frölunda HC	J20	29	4	11	15	84	7	2	4	6	22
2005–06	Frölunda HC	SEL	15	0	0	0	2	—	—	—	—	—
2006–07	Frölunda HC	J20	9	4	5	9	22	8	2	3	5	8
2006–07	Frölunda HC	SEL	46	1	3	4	20	—	—	—	—	—
2007–08	Frölunda HC	SEL	51	3	4	7	30	6	0	0	0	0
2007–08	Borås HC	Allsv	1	0	0	0	0	—	—	—	—	—
2008–09	San Antonio Rampage	AHL	43	1	6	7	35	—	—	—	—	—
2009–10	San Antonio Rampage	AHL	11	0	1	1	2	—	—	—	—	—
2010–11	San Antonio Rampage	AHL	42	2	2	4	10	—	—	—	—	—
2011–12	Modo Hockey	SEL	54	2	9	11	16	6	0	0	0	0
2012–13	Modo Hockey	SEL	53	2	6	8	22	5	1	0	1	2
2013–14	Frölunda HC	SHL	52	5	9	14	61	7	0	2	2	2
2014–15	Modo Hockey	SHL	37	3	8	11	12	—	—	—	—	—
2015–16	Avangard Omsk	KHL	54	2	7	9	8	7	0	1	1	2
2016–17	Avangard Omsk	KHL	44	4	6	10	28	12	3	2	5	4
2017–18	Avangard Omsk	KHL	42	3	7	10	8	—	—	—	—	—
2018–19	Rögle BK	SHL	39	3	4	7	20	—	—	—	—	—
2019–20	Leksands IF	SHL	37	7	9	16	8	—	—	—	—	—
2020–21	Leksands IF	SHL	40	6	9	15	14	4	0	0	0	0
2021–22	Leksands IF	SHL	38	1	7	8	15	3	0	2	2	0
2022–23	Leksands IF	SHL	48	2	6	8	18	3	0	0	0	4
SHL totals			510	35	74	109	238	34	1	4	5	8
KHL totals			140	9	20	29	44	19	3	3	6	6

Medal record

Ice hockey

Representing Sweden

World Championships
Bronze medal – third place	2014 Belarus	

=== International ===
Year	Team	Event	Result	GP	G	A	Pts	PIM
2007	Sweden	WJC	4th	7	0	1	1	6
2014	Sweden	WC	3rd place, bronze medalist(s)	3	0	0	0	0
2015	Sweden	WC	5th	7	0	1	1	4
2018	Sweden	OG	5th	3	0	0	0	2
Junior totals				7	0	1	1	6
Senior totals				13	0	1	1	6
