= 2007 Super Series =

2007 junior ice hockey series between Canada and Russia

Logo for the 2007 Super Series

The 2007 Super Series (Russian: Суперсерия 2007; French: 2007 Super Série) was an eight-game Under-20 ice hockey challenge between Russia and Canada. The series was won by Canada, who shocked the Russians with seven wins and one tie (there was no overtime in this series). Over the course of the eight games, Canada outscored Russia 39–13. The Series was held from August 27 to September 9 in various venues in both countries. The event commemorated the 35th anniversary of the 1972 Summit Series between the USSR and Canada.

It was reported on March 28, 2007, in a Moscow-based daily newspaper that Russian prime minister Mikhail Fradkov was keen for a third Summit Series to mark the 35th anniversary of the original 1972 series. According to the paper, Fradkov called upon Canadian prime minister Stephen Harper to support consideration for another Summit Series. Journalist Vsevolod Kukushkin, an interpreter for the Soviet team in the 1972 series, reported that the first to suggest a new Series was Hockey Canada president Bob Nicholson. Kukushkin wrote in his article:

In Nicholson's opinion the situation is very good now for such a series. Since the 1972 series, which was one of the most important sports events of the last century, a generation of players and fans have come and gone ... and a new generation of fans and players in both countries deserve to see such a great product.

Canada raised some eyebrows in Russia when head coach Brent Sutter had all his players 'run the gauntlet' during a practice before the first game.

The first four games were played in Russia where Canada won all four games, and the next four games were in Canada where the Canadian team had three wins and tied the Russians in the seventh game.

The Super Series' Most Valuable Player and leading scorer was Canada's Sam Gagner. Canada's Kyle Turris was the top goal scorer in the series.

== Ufa Arena fog issues ==
There were issues with fog on the ice during some of the games in the newly built Ufa Arena. The Russian rinks used were very new, and some issues with the air conditioning still needed to be worked out. When the fog got severe, the on ice officials would have the players skate around the rink during stoppages in play to attempt to disperse the fog. This caused some issues, when Canada's Brad Marchand took a misconduct penalty while skating around his zone.

== Schedule ==
Date	Local Time	UTC	Location	Score	Winner
August 27	19:00	13:00	Ufa Arena, Ufa	(Canada) 4 - 2 (Russia)	Canada
August 29	19:00	13:00	Ufa Arena, Ufa	(Canada) 3 - 0 (Russia)	Canada
August 31	19:00	12:00	Omsk Arena, Omsk	(Canada) 6 - 2 (Russia)	Canada
September 1	17:00	10:00	Omsk Arena, Omsk	(Canada) 4 - 2 (Russia)	Canada
September 4	19:00	00:00	MTS Centre, Winnipeg	(Russia) 1 - 8 (Canada)	Canada
September 5	19:00	00:00	Credit Union Centre, Saskatoon	(Russia) 1 - 4 (Canada)	Canada
September 7	20:00	02:00	Enmax Centrium, Red Deer	(Russia) 4 - 4 (Canada)	Draw
September 9	17:00	00:00	General Motors Place, Vancouver	(Russia) 1 - 6 (Canada)	Canada

=== Team records ===
Russia: 0 W - 7 L - 1 T
Canada: 7 W - 0 L - 1 T

== Game summaries ==
=== Game one ===
==== Game summary ====
The Russians got off to a flying start, as the Canadians seemed sluggish to begin the series, turning the puck over in the neutral zone many times early in the first period. Viacheslav Solodukhin of Russia scored the first goal of the tournament, giving the home team a 1–0 lead at 6:46. Alexander Ryabev made the game 2–0 with a power play goal three minutes and 13 seconds later, on a shot that could have been easily stopped by Canadian goalie Steve Mason. Canada's Stefan Legein replied at 15:47 to make it 2–1 Russia with a slap shot right through the wickets of Russian goaltender Semyon Varlamov. Kyle Turris scored on a penalty shot 41 seconds after that, after being tripped on a two-on-one.

Canada opened the scoring in the second period, when Brad Marchand bulged the twine 58 seconds in on a nice play set up by Sam Gagner. They made it 4–2 with 1:10 left in the period when Gagner scored after making a great play behind the net to bring it out front and slide it through the Russian goalie.

In the third period, Canada was able to hold on to the lead despite taking another five penalties to add to their high penalty count. The penalty kill was led by the strong play of coach Brent Sutter's son, Brandon.

Also contributing to the win was the solid play of Mason, who bounced back from giving up two early goals and finished the game with a total of 40 saves. Canada's penalty kill played extremely well, holding the Russians to only one power play goal on a shocking 13 power-play opportunities and leaving them scoreless on two 5-on-3s.

Karl Alzner was named player of the game for Canada.

==== Scoring summary ====
Period	Goals
First Period	06:46 RUS Viacheslav Solodukhin (Ilya Kablukov); 09:59 RUS Alexander Ryabev (Alexander Vasyunov) (power play); 15:47 CAN Stefan Legein (Brandon Sutter); 16:28 CAN Kyle Turris (penalty shot)
Second Period	00:58 CAN Brad Marchand (Sam Gagner, Claude Giroux); 18:50 CAN Sam Gagner (Brad Marchand)
Third Period	None

=== Game two ===
==== Game summary ====
Both sides switched their goaltenders for the second game. Canada opted for Jonathan Bernier, while Russia went with Sergei Bobrovsky. Canada was the home team in game two, allowing coach Brent Sutter to make the last change and get the line match-ups he wanted. About ten minutes into the game, Brandon Sutter delivered a devastating hit to Russian star Alexei Cherepanov, as the Russian tried to cut into the middle of the Canadian zone. Cherepanov suffered a concussion and would not return in the series. Sutter's hit set the tone for the Canadians and started what would become a chippy affair. On a Canadian power play later in the first period, Kyle Turris finished off a give-and-go with David Perron with a nifty backhand upstairs into the Russian goal.

As the second period began, fog began to become a factor in the game. The newly opened Ufa Arena did not have air conditioning, and because of the heat, a thick cloud of fog formed on the ice. Both teams were sent to skate around to try to clear the fog. The Canadians dominated the second period physically, very much due to Canada's checking line of Sutter, Legein, and Lucic. They smothered Cherepanov all game long, and also chipped in with a goal by Legein in the final minute of the second, one-timing a pass from Sutter.

Canada dominated the third as well, despite having to delay the game again to try to clear the fog. The game continued to be a heated affair, as there were scrums after many whistles, resulting in penalties for both teams. With 2:01 left, David Perron scored a terrific goal, as he dangled the Russian defender, then using a spin move and backhanding the puck through his legs into the net.

Jonathan Bernier earned the shutout in the 3–0 win.

==== Scoring summary ====
Period	Goals
First Period	14:42 CAN Kyle Turris (David Perron, John Tavares) (power play)
Second Period	19:45 CAN Stefan Legein (Brandon Sutter)
Third Period	17:59 CAN David Perron (Zachary Boychuk)

=== Game three ===
==== Game summary ====
Leland Irving got the start for Team Canada as the Super Series moved to Omsk for games three and four. Canada's powerplay was very effective, scoring four goals on nine chances. Semyon Varlamov started the game for the Russian squad, but was replaced after the first intermission by Vadim Zhelobnyuk. The game was closer than the final score indicated, as the Canadians only led by a goal heading into the third.

==== Scoring summary ====
Period	Goals
First Period	07:48 CAN Sam Gagner (David Perron) (power play); 09:40 CAN Kyle Turris (John Tavares, David Perron) (power play); 13:24 RUS Pavel Doronin (Viacheslav Solodukhin) (shorthanded); 15:11 CAN Colton Gillies
Second Period	04:33 RUS Alexander Ryabev
Third Period	05:28 CAN Claude Giroux (Stefan Legein, Milan Lucic) (power play); 06:14 CAN Stefan Legein (Keaton Ellerby); 17:00 CAN Zachary Boychuk (Josh Godfrey, Thomas Hickey) (power play/two-man)

=== Game four ===
==== Game summary ====
Brad Marchand opened the scoring in the final stages of the first period to give Canada a 1–0 lead. In the second period, Sam Gagner scored a goal and an assist on John Tavares' first goal of the series.

Facing a 3–0 deficit in the third period, Russia scored two quick goals in 36 seconds to open the final frame, cutting the lead down to one. Brent Sutter called a timeout after the two Russian goals and Marchand scored his second goal of the game on the next shift to halt the comeback.

The final score was 4–2 as Canada swept the first leg of the series in Russia.

==== Scoring summary ====
Period	Goals
First Period	18:16 CAN Brad Marchand
Second Period	01:43 CAN Sam Gagner (Brad Marchand); 12:19 CAN John Tavares (Sam Gagner, Claude Giroux) (power play)
Third Period	02:29 RUS Alexei Grishin (Igor Zubov, Maxim Mayorov); 02:56 RUS Maxim Chudinov; 03:45 CAN Brad Marchand (Keaton Ellerby)

=== Game five ===
==== Scoring summary ====
Period	Goals
First Period	None
Second Period	03:18 CAN Claude Giroux (Sam Gagner, Josh Godfrey) (power play); 06:05 CAN Claude Giroux (Sam Gagner); 08:56 RUS Alexander Vasyunov (power play); 11:52 CAN Logan Pyett (Kyle Turris) (shorthanded); 15:15 CAN David Perron (John Tavares, Drew Doughty) (power play); 16:21 CAN Sam Gagner (Josh Godfrey, Claude Giroux) (power play)
Third Period	06:53 CAN Zachary Boychuk (David Perron, Logan Pyett); 13:07 CAN Zach Hamill (Brad Marchand, Thomas Hickey) (power play); 15:31 CAN Kyle Turris (John Tavares)

=== Game six ===
==== Scoring summary ====
Period	Goals
First Period	19:23 CAN Sam Gagner (Drew Doughty, Claude Giroux) (four-on-four)
Second Period	04:17 RUS Ivan Vishnevsky (Artem Anisimov, Alexander Ryabev) (power play)
Third Period	07:06 CAN Dana Tyrell (Zach Hamill); 13:05 CAN Brandon Sutter (Karl Alzner) (shorthanded); 18:04 CAN Zachary Boychuk (Karl Alzner, Zach Hamill) (power play)

=== Game seven ===
==== Scoring summary ====
Period	Goals
First Period	01:17 RUS Vyacheslav Voynov (Maxim Mamin, Evgeny Kurbatov) (power play); 17:10 RUS Evgeny Bodrov; 19:28 CAN Kyle Turris (Thomas Hickey, John Tavares) (power play)
Second Period	12:35 CAN Logan Pyett (John Tavares, David Perron); 16:31 CAN Brandon Sutter (Sam Gagner, Claude Giroux) (power play); 16:48 RUS Maxim Mamin (Ruslan Bashkirov, Maxim Mayorov); 19:31 RUS Alexander Vasyunov (Ruslan Bashkirov, Vyatcheslav Voynov) (power play)
Third Period	01:32 CAN Sam Gagner (Josh Godfrey, Thomas Hickey) (power play)

=== Game eight ===
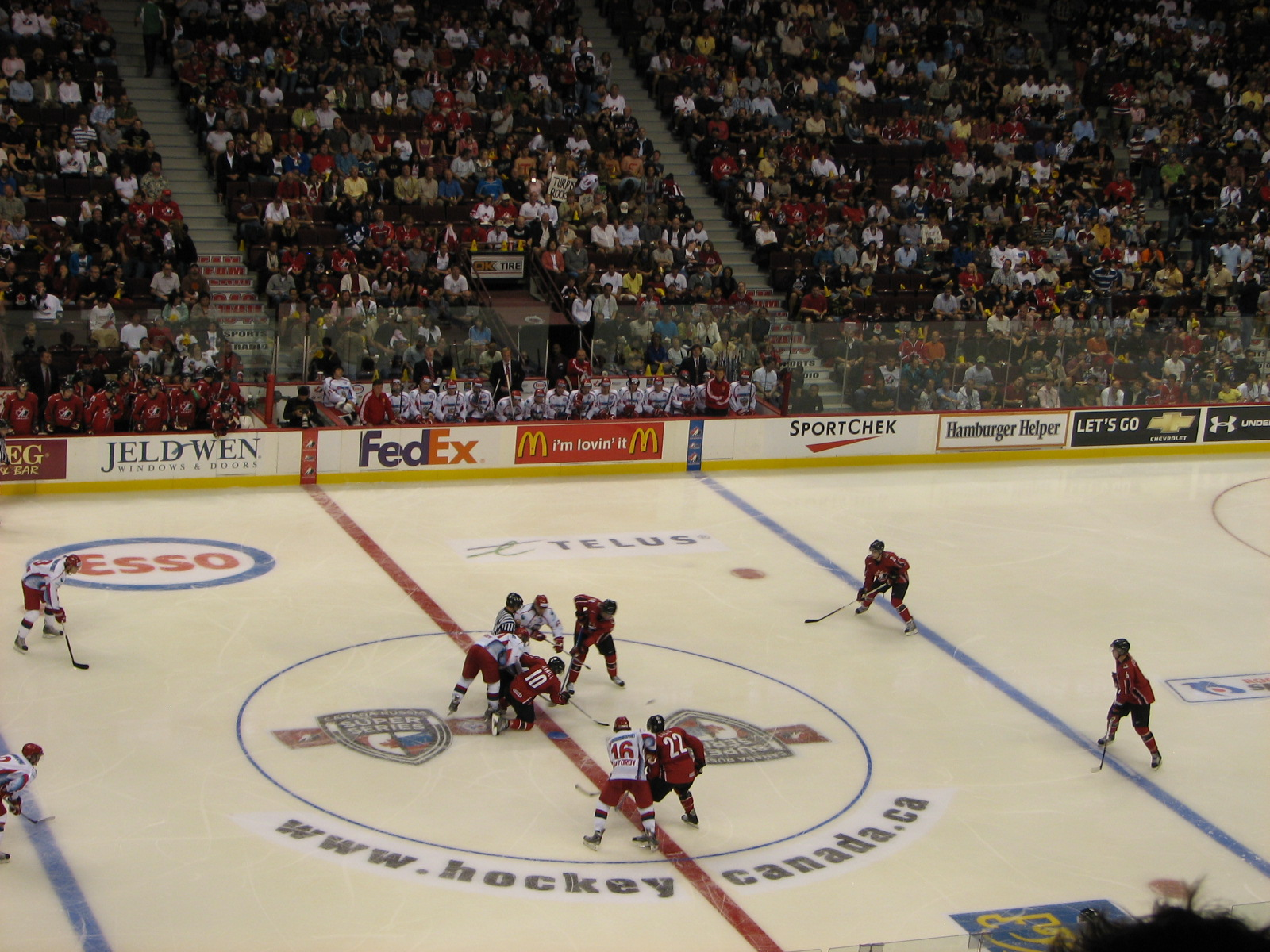
Game eight of the Super Series at General Motors Place in Vancouver

==== Scoring summary ====
Period	Goals
First Period	None
Second Period	03:43 CAN Karl Alzner (Claude Giroux, Sam Gagner) (power play); 11:13 CAN Brandon Sutter (Sam Gagner, Karl Alzner) (power play/two-man); 13:08 CAN Zachary Boychuk (Zach Hamill) (power play)
Third Period	09:57 CAN Kyle Turris (Zachary Boychuk, Zach Hamill) (power play); 15:46 CAN Kyle Turris (John Tavares, Josh Godfrey) (power play); 16:08 CAN Colton Gillies (Logan Pyett, Milan Lucic); 17:20 RUS Evgeni Dadonov (Alexander Ryabev)

== Leading scorers ==
	Player	GP	G	A	Pts	PIM
(Canada)	Sam Gagner	8	6	9	15	8
(Canada)	John Tavares	8	1	8	9	26
(Canada)	Kyle Turris	8	7	1	8	6
(Canada)	Claude Giroux	8	3	5	8	22
(Canada)	David Perron	7	2	5	7	6
(Canada)	Zachary Boychuk	7	4	2	6	12
(Canada)	Brad Marchand	6	3	3	6	26
(Canada)	Zach Hamill	6	1	5	6	4
(Canada)	Josh Godfrey	6	0	6	6	2
(Canada)	Brandon Sutter	8	3	2	5	6

== Goaltenders ==
	Player	MINS	GA	GAA	Sv%
(Canada)	Jonathan Bernier	151	3	1.19	.956
(Canada)	Leland Irving	180	4	1.33	.955
(Canada)	Steve Mason	149	6	2.42	.938
(Russia)	Vadim Zhelobnyuk	100	7	4.20	.879
(Russia)	Semyon Varlamov	140	11	4.71	.861
(Russia)	Sergei Bobrovsky	240	21	5.25	.853

== Rosters ==
=== Canada ===
Head coach: Brent Sutter
Assistant coaches: Benoit Groulx, Peter DeBoer

Goaltenders
#	Player	Catches	2006–07 team	Hometown	NHL rights
1	Jonathan Bernier	L	Lewiston Maineiacs	Laval, Quebec	Los Angeles Kings, 11th (2006)
30	Steve Mason	R	London Knights	Oakville, Ontario	Columbus Blue Jackets, 69th (2006)
31	Leland Irving	L	Everett Silvertips	Swan Hills, Alberta	Calgary Flames, 26th (2006)

Defencemen
#	Player	Shoots	2006–07 team	Hometown	NHL rights
2	Josh Godfrey	R	Sault Ste. Marie Greyhounds	Kingston, Ontario	Washington Capitals, 34th (2007)
3	Logan Pyett	R	Regina Pats	Milestone, Saskatchewan	Detroit Red Wings, 212th (2006)
4	Thomas Hickey	L	Seattle Thunderbirds	Calgary, Alberta	Los Angeles Kings, 4th (2007)
5	Keaton Ellerby	L	Kamloops Blazers	Calgary, Alberta	Florida Panthers, 10th (2007)
6	Ty Wishart	L	Prince George Cougars	Comox, British Columbia	San Jose Sharks, 16th (2006)
8	Drew Doughty	R	Guelph Storm	London, Ontario	Los Angeles Kings, 2nd (2008)
15	Luke Schenn	R	Kelowna Rockets	Saskatoon, Saskatchewan	Toronto Maple Leafs, 5th (2008)
27	Karl Alzner– A	L	Calgary Hitmen	Burnaby, British Columbia	Washington Capitals, 5th (2007)

Forwards
#	Player	Shoots	2006–07 team	Hometown	NHL rights
9	Sam Gagner– A	R	London Knights	Oakville, Ontario	Edmonton Oilers, 6th (2007)
10	Zach Hamill	R	Everett Silvertips	Port Coquitlam, British Columbia	Boston Bruins, 8th (2007)
11	Zachary Boychuk	L	Lethbridge Hurricanes	Airdrie, Alberta	Carolina Hurricanes, 14th (2008)
12	Brandon Sutter– A	R	Red Deer Rebels	Red Deer, Alberta	Carolina Hurricanes, 11th (2007)
14	Dana Tyrell	L	Prince George Cougars	Airdrie, Alberta	Tampa Bay Lightning, 47th (2007)
16	David Perron	R	Lewiston Maineiacs	Sherbrooke, Quebec	St. Louis Blues, 26th (2007)
17	Brad Marchand	L	Val-d'Or Foreurs	Hammonds Plains, Nova Scotia	Boston Bruins, 71st (2006)
18	Colton Gillies	L	Saskatoon Blades	Surrey, British Columbia	Minnesota Wild, 16th (2007)
19	Kyle Turris	R	Burnaby Express	New Westminster, British Columbia	Phoenix Coyotes, 3rd (2007)
20	John Tavares	L	Oshawa Generals	Oakville, Ontario	New York Islanders, 1st (2009)
21	Stefan Legein	R	Niagara IceDogs	Oakville, Ontario	Columbus Blue Jackets, 37th (2007)
22	Milan Lucic – C	L	Vancouver Giants	Vancouver, British Columbia	Boston Bruins, 50th (2006)
25	Cory Emmerton	L	Kingston Frontenacs	St. Thomas, Ontario	Detroit Red Wings, 41st (2006)
28	Claude Giroux	R	Gatineau Olympiques	Hearst, Ontario	Philadelphia Flyers, 22nd (2006)

=== Russia ===
Head coach: Sergei Nemchinov
Assistant coaches: Vladimir Popov, Yuri Leonov

Goaltenders
#	Player	Catches	2006–07 team	Hometown	NHL rights
1	Semyon Varlamov	L	Lokomotiv Yaroslavl	Samara	Washington Capitals, 23rd (2006)
31	Vadim Zhelobnyuk	L	HC Dynamo Moscow	Moscow
35	Sergei Bobrovsky	L	Metallurg Novokuznetsk

Defencemen
#	Player	Shoots	2006–07 team	Hometown	NHL rights
2	Pavel Doronin	L	Ufa Salavat	Ufa
3	Alexei Grishin	R	Vityaz Chekhov
4	Igor Zubov	R	Lokomotiv Yaroslavl	Tolyatti
5	Valeri Zhukov	L	Torpedo Nizhny Novgorod
20	Konstantin Alexeev	R	HC Sibir Novosibirsk
23	Yuri Alexandrov – C	L	Severstal Cherepovets	Cherepovets	Boston Bruins, 37th (2006)
27	Maxim Chudinov	R	Severstal Cherepovets	Cherepovets	Boston Bruins, 195th (2010)
29	Ivan Vishnevskiy	L	Rouyn-Noranda Huskies	Barnaul	Dallas Stars, 27th (2006)
30	Vyacheslav Voinov	L	Traktor Chelyabinsk	Chelyabinsk	Los Angeles Kings, 32nd (2008)

Forwards
#	Player	Shoots	2006–07 team	Hometown	NHL rights
7	Alexei Cherepanov	L	Avangard Omsk	Barnaul	New York Rangers, 17th (2007)
8	Konstantin Kulikov		HC Neftekhimik Nizhnekamsk
10	Evgeny Bodrov	L	HC Lada Togliatti
12	Artem Anisimov	L	Lokomotiv Yaroslavl	Yaroslavl	New York Rangers, 54th (2006)
14	Alexander Ryabev	L	Lokomotiv Yaroslavl	Yaroslavl
15	Maxim Mamin	L	Metallurg Magnitogorsk
16	Maxim Mayorov	L	AK Bars Kazan	Leninogorsk	Columbus Blue Jackets, 94th (2007)
17	Viacheslav Solodukhin	L	SKA St. Petersburg
18	Sergei Zachupeiko	L	Ufa Salavat	Orsk
19	Egor Averin	L	Avangard Omsk	Omsk
22	Ilya Kablukov	L	HC CSKA Moscow	Moscow	Vancouver Canucks, 146th (2007)
24	Alexander Vasyunov	R	Lokomotiv Yaroslavl	Yaroslavl	New Jersey Devils, 58th (2006)
25	Nikita Filatov	R	HC CSKA Moscow	Moscow	Columbus Blue Jackets, 6th (2008)
26	Evgeni Dadonov	L	Traktor Chelyabinsk	Chelyabinsk	Florida Panthers, 71st (2007)
28	Anton Glovatsky	L	Metallurg Magnitogorsk	Magnitogorsk

Added due to injuries for Game 5-8
#	Player	Shoots	2006–07 team	Hometown	NHL rights
6	Kirill Tulupov (D)	R	Chicoutimi Saguenéens	Moscow	New Jersey Devils, 67th (2006)
34	Ruslan Bashkirov (F)	L	Quebec Remparts	Moscow	Ottawa Senators, 60th (2007)
37	Viktor Tikhonov (F)	R	Severstal Cherepovets	Moscow	Phoenix Coyotes, 28th (2008)

== See also ==
- 1974 Summit Series
- 2007 in ice hockey
- 2008 World Junior Ice Hockey Championships
- 2012 Canada–Russia Challenge
- IIHF World Junior Championship
- Super Series
