= Dana Tyrell =

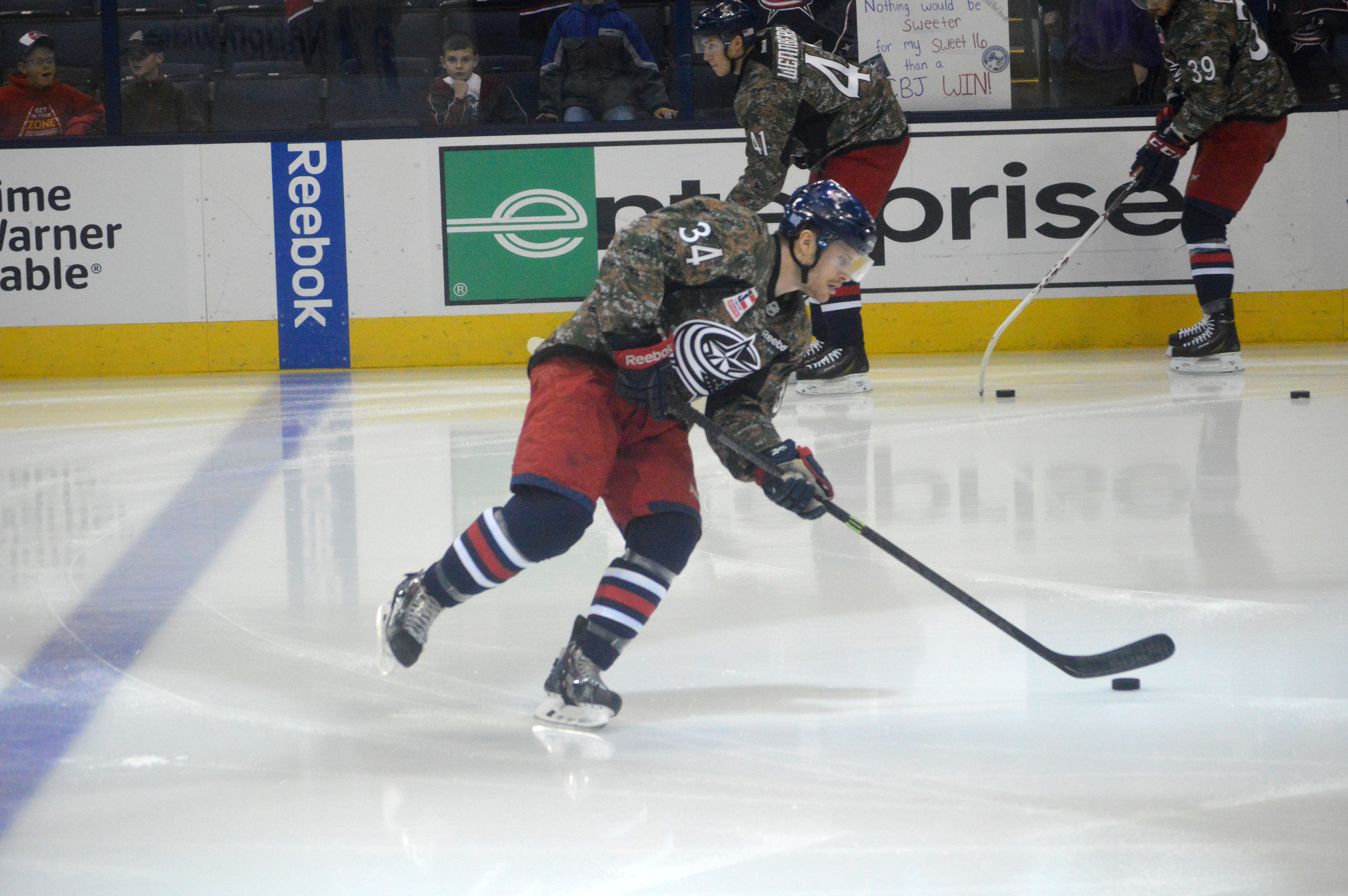
- Tyrell with the Columbus Blue Jackets in 2014
- Born: April 23, 1989 (age 36) Airdrie, Alberta, Canada
- Height: 5 ft 10 in (178 cm)
- Weight: 185 lb (84 kg; 13 st 3 lb)
- Position: Centre
- Shot: Left
- Played for: Tampa Bay Lightning; Columbus Blue Jackets
- NHL draft: 47th overall, 2007; Tampa Bay Lightning
- Playing career: 2008–2015; 2017

Dana Tyrell (born April 23, 1989) is a Canadian former professional ice hockey centre who played five seasons in the National Hockey League (NHL), primarily for the Tampa Bay Lightning. He was selected in the second round (47th overall) by the Lightning in the 2007 NHL entry draft. He also played for the Columbus Blue Jackets.

== Playing career ==
=== Early career ===
Tyrell was a fifth-round selection of the Prince George Cougars in the Western Hockey League (WHL) Bantam Draft in 2004. He appeared in one game that season before establishing himself as a regular with the Cougars in 2005–06. He scored 30 goals in his second full season, and was selected in the second round of the 2007 NHL entry draft by the Tampa Bay Lightning. Additionally, he made his international debut for the Canadian junior team at the 2007 Super Series, scoring one goal in eight games, but failed to make the team for the 2008 World Junior Ice Hockey Championships.

=== Professional career ===
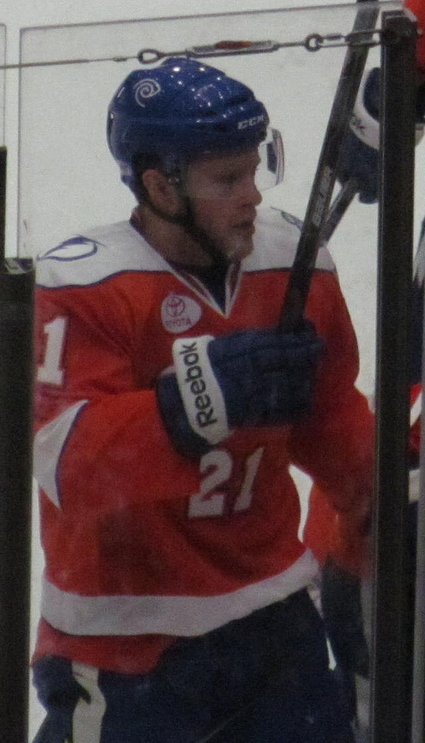
Tyrell with the Syracuse Crunch in 2013

After completing a 65-point season for the Cougars in 2007–08, Tyrell was assigned to Tampa's American Hockey League (AHL) affiliate, the Norfolk Admirals. He appeared in 11 games for Norfolk, scoring one goal and five assists to complete his season. The Lightning returned him to junior to complete his 19-year-old season in 2008–09, and with 40 points in 30 games, was named to the Canadian team for the 2009 World Junior Ice Hockey Championships. He never appeared in a tournament game, however, suffering a knee injury in an exhibition game against Sweden prior to the tournament. The injury required surgery to repair torn ligaments, and ended his season.

Assigned to Norfolk for the 2009–10 AHL season, Tyrell struggled early, failing to score a goal in his first 38 games, but improved in the last half of the season, scoring nine goals and 27 points in the final 36 games of his season. He earned a spot with the Lightning to begin the 2010–11 season, and made his NHL debut in Tampa's opening game against the Atlanta Thrashers. Tyrell scored his first NHL goal on October 27, 2010, against Marc-André Fleury of the Pittsburgh Penguins.

At the 2013–14 trade deadline, on March 5, 2014, Tyrell was traded by the Lightning, along with Matt Taormina, to the Columbus Blue Jackets in exchange for Jonathan Marchessault and Dalton Smith.

Tyrell took a two-year hiatus from playing professionally before accepting an invitation to try out for the AHL's Bakersfield Condors training camp for the 2017–18 season, on September 25, 2017. He was later signed to a contract with ECHL affiliate, the Wichita Thunder, on October 11, 2017. He appeared in 4 games with the Thunder in the 2017–18 season, before opting to retire abruptly from professional hockey on December 21, 2017.

== Personal life ==
He is the son of Ray and Dawn Tyrell. He has two sisters, Kaitlyn and Sarah, who is his twin, and a brother, Corey. His childhood friend Zach Boychuk plays for Eisbären Berlin of the Deutsche Eishockey Liga (DEL); both grew up in Airdrie, Alberta.

== Career statistics ==
=== Regular season and playoffs ===
			Regular season					Playoffs
Season	Team	League	GP	G	A	Pts	PIM	GP	G	A	Pts	PIM
2004–05	Prince George Cougars	WHL	1	0	0	0	2	—	—	—	—	—
2005–06	Prince George Cougars	WHL	69	7	11	18	44	5	0	0	0	2
2006–07	Prince George Cougars	WHL	72	30	26	56	51	15	1	6	7	4
2007–08	Prince George Cougars	WHL	68	25	40	65	47	—	—	—	—	—
2007–08	Norfolk Admirals	AHL	11	1	5	6	6	—	—	—	—	—
2008–09	Prince George Cougars	WHL	30	19	21	40	27	—	—	—	—	—
2009–10	Norfolk Admirals	AHL	74	9	27	36	22	—	—	—	—	—
2010–11	Tampa Bay Lightning	NHL	78	6	9	15	12	7	0	0	0	2
2011–12	Tampa Bay Lightning	NHL	26	0	5	5	6	—	—	—	—	—
2011–12	Norfolk Admirals	AHL	18	4	5	9	8	—	—	—	—	—
2012–13	Tampa Bay Lightning	NHL	21	1	3	4	4	—	—	—	—	—
2012–13	Syracuse Crunch	AHL	15	5	3	8	11	—	—	—	—	—
2013–14	Syracuse Crunch	AHL	44	9	12	21	20	—	—	—	—	—
2013–14	Tampa Bay Lightning	NHL	7	0	0	0	4	—	—	—	—	—
2013–14	Springfield Falcons	AHL	19	6	6	12	0	5	1	2	3	4
2014–15	Springfield Falcons	AHL	51	13	13	26	34	—	—	—	—	—
2014–15	Columbus Blue Jackets	NHL	3	0	0	0	0	—	—	—	—	—
2017–18	Wichita Thunder	ECHL	4	0	1	1	11	—	—	—	—	—
NHL totals			135	7	17	24	26	7	0	0	0	2

=== International ===
Year	Team	Event	Result	GP	G	A	Pts	PIM
2006	Canada Pacific	U17	4th	6	3	5	8	0
2007	Canada	SS	1st place, gold medalist(s)	8	1	0	1	2
Junior totals				14	4	5	9	2
