= Sam Gagner =

Canadian ice hockey player (born 1989)

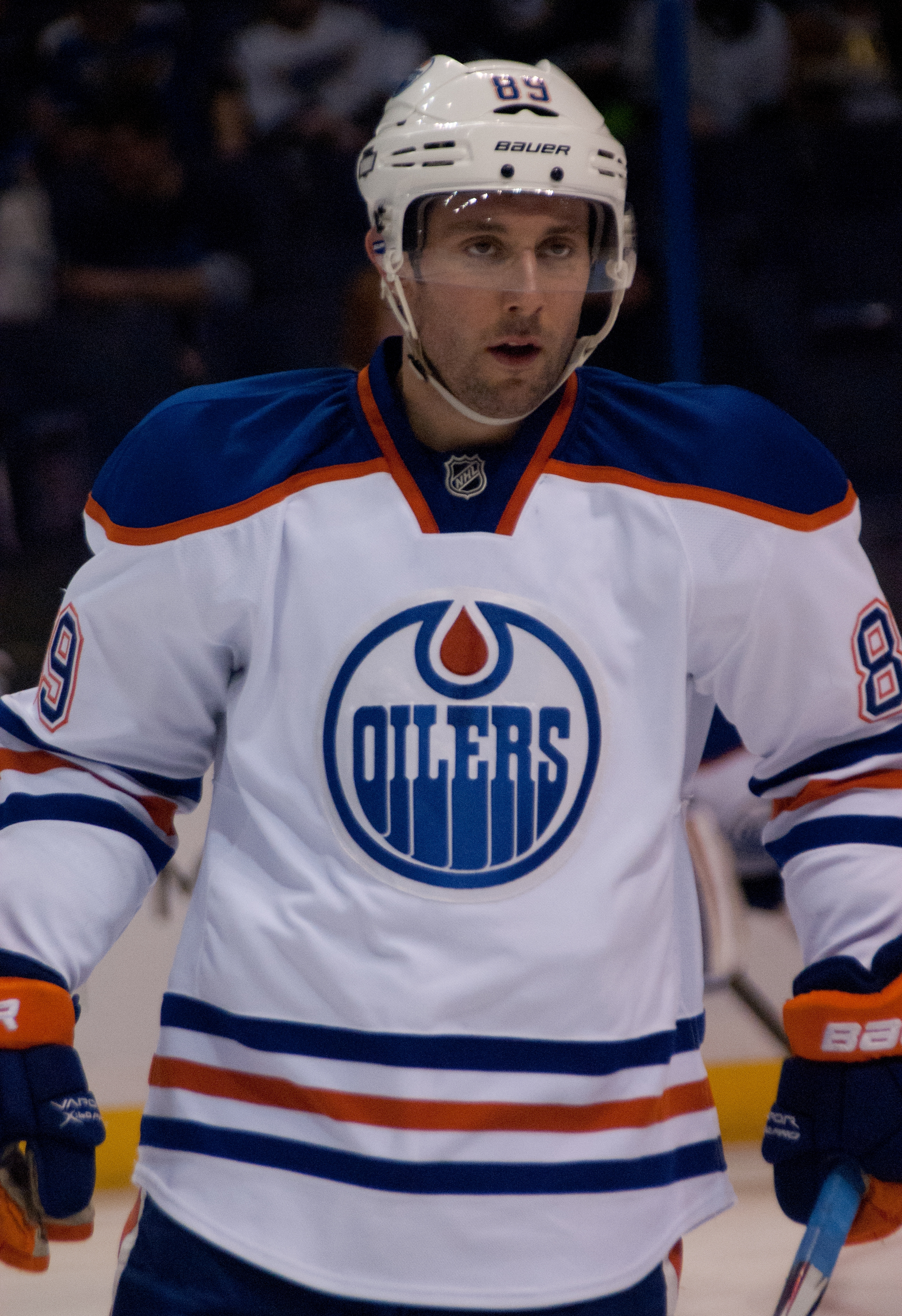
- Gagner with the Edmonton Oilers in 2012
- Born: 10 August 1989 (age 36) London, Ontario, Canada
- Height: 5 ft 11 in (180 cm)
- Weight: 200 lb (91 kg; 14 st 4 lb)
- Position: Centre
- Shot: Right
- Played for: Edmonton Oilers; EC KAC; Arizona Coyotes; Philadelphia Flyers; Columbus Blue Jackets; Vancouver Canucks; Detroit Red Wings; Winnipeg Jets
- National team: Canada
- NHL draft: 6th overall, 2007; Edmonton Oilers
- Playing career: 2007–2025

Sam William Gagner (born 10 August 1989) is a Canadian former professional ice hockey forward who played 17 seasons in the National Hockey League (NHL) for the Edmonton Oilers, Arizona Coyotes, Philadelphia Flyers, Columbus Blue Jackets, Vancouver Canucks, Detroit Red Wings, and Winnipeg Jets.

Gagner was drafted by the Oilers in the first round, sixth overall, of the 2007 NHL entry draft, and played there for the first seven years of his NHL career. He also played one season each for the Coyotes, Flyers, Blue Jackets, and Canucks before returning to Edmonton in 2019; he was then traded to the Red Wings in 2020. After three years in Detroit followed by a season with the Jets, Gagner returned to Edmonton for a third tenure in 2023.

== Playing career ==
=== Amateur ===
Gagner played midget hockey with the Toronto Marlboros of the Greater Toronto Hockey League (GTHL) in 2004–05. He scored 173 points and was awarded the Buck Houle Award, a Marlboros team award given for outstanding on-ice performance and leadership. The same season, he made his junior debut, playing 13 games for the Milton Icehawks of the OPJHL, scoring 15 points. His dad was the coach of his minor hockey career. In 2005–06, he joined the Sioux City Musketeers of the United States Hockey League (USHL) and scored 46 points in 56 games, second in team scoring. Along the way, Gagner played with future NHLer John Tavares on the Marlboros and later the Icehawks. As early as 2002, the pair also honed their skills and became friends on a backyard rink built by Sam's dad Dave in Oakville.

Gagner originally committed to play hockey at the collegiate level for the University of Wisconsin–Madison, but later decided to stay closer to home by playing for a Canadian major junior hockey team. Considered a first-round talent, the Ontario Hockey League (OHL)'s London Knights selected him in the fourth round of the 2005 OHL entry draft on a flyer, as his commitment to play college hockey deterred many OHL teams from drafting him. Joined by future NHL stars Patrick Kane and Sergei Kostitsyn on the Knights' top line in 2006–07, Gagner scored 118 points in 53 games, fifth in OHL scoring. He also captained Team Burns/Bergeron (Red) in the 2007 CHL Top Prospects Game to a 5–3 victory over Team Bowman/Demers (White).

=== Professional ===
==== Edmonton Oilers ====
Gagner was drafted in the first round, sixth overall by the Edmonton Oilers in the 2007 NHL entry draft. On 1 October 2007, he was then signed to a three-year, entry-level contract with the Oilers. He played his first NHL game on 4 October in a 3–2 shootout victory over the San Jose Sharks and earned his first NHL point, assisting on a goal scored by defenceman Tom Gilbert. On 20 October, Gagner scored his first career NHL goal against Miikka Kiprusoff of the Calgary Flames.

As the NHL's youngest player in 2007–08, he tallied 49 points in 79 games playing between wingers and fellow rookies Andrew Cogliano and Robert Nilsson on a combination dubbed the "Kid Line." During the season, Gagner participated in the 2008 NHL YoungStars Game in Atlanta as part of All-Star weekend and was also named the NHL Rookie of the Month for February. As part of a month-long scoring stretch in which he scored 13 points in 12 games, he also established an Oilers team record for the longest assists streak by a rookie with nine in eight straight games.

The next season, 2008–09, Gagner recorded his first career NHL hat-trick and added an assist for a four-point game in an 8–1 win against the Colorado Avalanche on 19 March 2009. He finished his sophomore season with 16 goals and 41 points in 76 games. In the following two campaigns, he posted 41- and 42-point efforts.

On 9 March 2011, Gagner severed a tendon in his left hand while facing the Washington Capitals when teammate Ryan Jones caught him with a skate blade while jumping over the boards. Requiring surgery, Gagner was sidelined for the remainder of the 2010–11 season, as well as one month into the following campaign, making his return to the Oilers line-up on 22 October 2011. Several months later, on 2 February 2012, Gagner scored four goals and four assists against the Chicago Blackhawks, tying the team record of eight points in a game, previously set by Wayne Gretzky and Paul Coffey. The feat also made him the eighth NHL player of all time to score eight or more points in a single game, and the first since Mario Lemieux did it in 1989. Two days later, Gagner scored two goals and added an assist in the first period against the Detroit Red Wings, setting a new Oilers record with 11 consecutive points, previously held by Gretzky, who scored ten consecutive points twice his career. Gagner finished the season with 47 points over 75 games, with nearly a quarter of his output having occurred in that two-game stretch.

During the 2012–13 NHL lock-out, Gagner signed with Klagenfurter AC of the Eishockey Liga in Austria. On 22 July 2013, shortly after the end of the 2012–13 season, the Oilers signed Gagner to a three-year contract extension worth an average annual value of $4.8 million.

==== Trade to Arizona ====
On 29 June 2014, the Tampa Bay Lightning acquired Gagner in exchange for Teddy Purcell. Gagner, however, only spent an hour as a member of the Lightning before then being acquired by the Arizona Coyotes, along with B. J. Crombeen, in exchange for a sixth-round pick in the 2015 NHL entry draft.

During the Coyotes' training camp ahead of the 2014–15 season, Arizona head coach Dave Tippett experimented utilizing Gagner on the right wing instead of his natural centre position, where he played in a pre-season, 5–4 shootout victory over the Los Angeles Kings. With a fresh start, former with Arizona, Gagner found chemistry playing on a line with centre Martin Hanzal; the two combined for 16 points in just five games in December and January 2015.

==== Philadelphia Flyers/Columbus Blue Jackets ====
On 27 June 2015, Gagner was traded to the Philadelphia Flyers along with a conditional third (2017) or fourth (2016) round draft pick in return for Nicklas Grossmann and the contract of Chris Pronger. Coyotes general manager Don Maloney explained the trade as being due to a belief in the organization that Gagner "couldn't play centre at the NHL level".

On 1 August 2016, Gagner signed a one-year deal with the Columbus Blue Jackets. Following a resurgent season with the Blue Jackets where he set a career-high in points with 50, Gagner signed a 3-year $9.45 million contract with the Vancouver Canucks.

==== Vancouver Canucks and return to Edmonton ====
Prior to the 2018–19 season, after attending the Canucks training camp and pre-season Gagner was placed on waivers by the Canucks on 1 October 2018. He cleared waivers the next day, and was loaned in order to be closer to his family to the Toronto Marlies, affiliate of the Toronto Maple Leafs. Gagner scored 15 points in 15 games with the Marlies before he was recalled by the injury-struck Canucks on 18 November 2018. He registered 1 goal and 3 points in 7 games before Vancouver returned to health and he was returned to the Marlies on 4 December 2018.

Through 43 games with the Marlies, Gagner was among the team's top scorers with 37 points. He was traded by the Canucks in return to his original draft club, the Edmonton Oilers, in exchange for Ryan Spooner on 16 February 2019. During the 2019–20 season, Gagner recorded five goals and seven assists in 36 games for the Oilers.

==== Detroit Red Wings ====
On 24 February 2020, Gagner was traded at the NHL trade deadline from the Oilers, along with second-round draft picks in 2020 and 2021, to the Detroit Red Wings in exchange for Andreas Athanasiou and Ryan Kuffner. He added one goal in 6 games with the Red Wings before their season was prematurely ended due to the COVID-19 pandemic suspending play.

On 26 September 2020, the Red Wings signed Gagner to a one-year, $850,000 contract extension. On 28 July 2021, the Red Wings signed Gagner to a one-year contract extension.

==== Winnipeg Jets ====
As a free agent from the Red Wings, Gagner continued his career by signing for his 16th season in the NHL in agreeing to a one-year, league minimum $750,000 contract with the Winnipeg Jets on 2 September 2022. In a depth forward role for the Jets in the 2022–23 season, Gagner played his 1,000th NHL career game on 29 December 2022, against the Vancouver Canucks. He contributed with 8 goals and 6 assists for 14 points in 48 regular season games before he was ruled out for the remainder of the campaign with season ending surgery to both hips on 16 March 2023.

==== Third tenure with Edmonton ====
As a free agent following his lone season with the Jets, Gagner opted to extend his career by accepting an invitation to return to the Oilers on a professional tryout contract in preparation for the 2023–24 NHL season on 29 August 2023. Continuing his rehab from his double hip surgery, Gagner did not appear in any pre-season games with the Oilers, and was later signed to a one-year AHL contract with the Oilers' affiliate, the Bakersfield Condors, for the 2023–24 AHL season on 23 October 2023. However, just eight days after signing with Bakersfield, Gagner was signed to a one-year, two-way NHL contract by the Oilers on 31 October, marking his third tenure with the team. In his first game with Edmonton since 2020, Gagner scored two goals, but the Oilers lost to the Dallas Stars 4–3.

==== Belleville Senators and retirement ====
As an unsigned free agent leading into the mid-point of the 2024–25 season, Gagner opted to continue his professional career by signing a professional tryout (PTO) contract with AHL outfit, the Belleville Senators, affiliate to the Ottawa Senators, on 24 January 2025.

Several months later, on 15 May, Gagner joined the Ottawa Senators' front office as director of player development, ending his playing career.

== International play ==
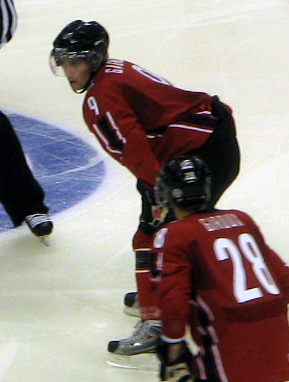
- Gagner with Canada at the 2007 Super Series

Medal record

Representing Canada

Ice hockey

World Championship
Silver medal – second place	2008 Canada	

World Junior Championship
Gold medal – first place	2007 Sweden	

Spengler Cup
Gold medal – first place	2012 Davos	

Gagner competed for Canada at the 2007 World Junior Championships in Sweden, playing in all six games as the youngest player on the team, helping Canada to their third of five-straight gold medals.

Later that year, upon being selected in the 2007 NHL entry draft, Gagner competed in the 2007 Super Series, an eight-game series between Canada's and Russia's national junior teams commemorating the 1972 Summit Series. He scored 15 points and was named series MVP, as Canada defeated Russia 7–0–1 in the series.

After Gagner's 2007–08 rookie season with the Oilers, he made his senior international debut with Canada in the 2008 World Championships in Canada as a reserve. Gagner played in one preliminary game as Canada was defeated in the gold medal game by Russia.

In December 2024, Gagner was selected for Canada's squad for the 2024 Spengler Cup in Davos, Switzerland. Gagner played in both of Canada's group stage games, registering an assist in the opener against the tournament hosts, HC Davos, before featuring in their semi-final loss to Straubing Tigers.

== Personal life ==
In his rookie year, Gagner lived in a house provided by Oilers captain Ethan Moreau, along with teammates Andrew Cogliano and Tom Gilbert. In the summer of 2009, Gilbert bought his own house while Gagner and Cogliano each got apartments in Edmonton in the same complex. During the off-season, Gagner goes back to his hometown of London, Ontario.

Gagner is the son of former NHL player Dave Gagner, who spent 15 seasons with the Rangers, North Stars/Stars, Flames, Maple Leafs, Panthers and Canucks. Due to his dad's career, Sam Gagner grew up in Minneapolis, Dallas, Toronto, Calgary, Miami, Vancouver and Oakville. His sister, Jessica Gagner, played hockey for the Dartmouth Big Green women's ice hockey program.

Gagner married longtime girlfriend Dr. Rachel Linke in Muskoka, Ontario, on 12 July 2014. They have three children.

== Career statistics ==
=== Regular season and playoffs ===
			Regular season					Playoffs
Season	Team	League	GP	G	A	Pts	PIM	GP	G	A	Pts	PIM
2004–05	Toronto Marlboros AAA	GTHL U16	89	63	110	173	56	—	—	—	—	—
2004–05	Milton Icehawks	OPJHL	13	5	10	15	10	—	—	—	—	—
2005–06	Sioux City Musketeers	USHL	56	11	35	46	60	—	—	—	—	—
2006–07	London Knights	OHL	53	35	83	118	36	16	7	22	29	22
2007–08	Edmonton Oilers	NHL	79	13	36	49	23	—	—	—	—	—
2008–09	Edmonton Oilers	NHL	76	16	25	41	51	—	—	—	—	—
2009–10	Edmonton Oilers	NHL	68	15	26	41	33	—	—	—	—	—
2010–11	Edmonton Oilers	NHL	68	15	27	42	37	—	—	—	—	—
2011–12	Edmonton Oilers	NHL	75	18	29	47	36	—	—	—	—	—
2012–13	EC KAC	EBEL	21	10	10	20	8	—	—	—	—	—
2012–13	Edmonton Oilers	NHL	48	14	24	38	23	—	—	—	—	—
2013–14	Edmonton Oilers	NHL	67	10	27	37	41	—	—	—	—	—
2014–15	Arizona Coyotes	NHL	81	15	26	41	28	—	—	—	—	—
2015–16	Philadelphia Flyers	NHL	53	8	8	16	25	6	0	2	2	8
2015–16	Lehigh Valley Phantoms	AHL	9	1	5	6	4	—	—	—	—	—
2016–17	Columbus Blue Jackets	NHL	81	18	32	50	22	5	0	2	2	2
2017–18	Vancouver Canucks	NHL	74	10	21	31	35	—	—	—	—	—
2018–19	Toronto Marlies	AHL	43	12	25	37	12	—	—	—	—	—
2018–19	Vancouver Canucks	NHL	7	1	2	3	4	—	—	—	—	—
2018–19	Edmonton Oilers	NHL	25	5	5	10	10	—	—	—	—	—
2019–20	Bakersfield Condors	AHL	4	2	2	4	5	—	—	—	—	—
2019–20	Edmonton Oilers	NHL	36	5	7	12	10	—	—	—	—	—
2019–20	Detroit Red Wings	NHL	6	1	0	1	2	—	—	—	—	—
2020–21	Detroit Red Wings	NHL	42	7	8	15	15	—	—	—	—	—
2021–22	Detroit Red Wings	NHL	81	13	18	31	32	—	—	—	—	—
2022–23	Winnipeg Jets	NHL	48	8	6	14	13	—	—	—	—	—
2023–24	Bakersfield Condors	AHL	15	3	6	9	0	—	—	—	—	—
2023–24	Edmonton Oilers	NHL	28	5	5	10	10	—	—	—	—	—
2024–25	Belleville Senators	AHL	19	0	10	10	4	—	—	—	—	—
NHL totals			1,043	197	332	529	450	11	0	4	4	10

=== International ===
Year	Team	Event	Result	GP	G	A	Pts	PIM
2006	Canada Ontario	U17	5th	5	6	7	13	0
2007	Canada	WJC	1st place, gold medalist(s)	6	0	0	0	8
2008	Canada	WC	2nd place, silver medalist(s)	1	0	0	0	0
Junior totals				19	12	16	28	16
Senior totals				1	0	0	0	0

== Awards and honours ==
Award	Year
Toronto Marlboros
Buck Houle Award	2004
USHL
All-Rookie Team	2006
OHL
CHL/NHL Top Prospects Game	2007
First All-Rookie Team	2007
Third All-Star Team	2007
CHL All-Rookie Team	2007
NHL
NHL YoungStars Game	2008
Rookie of the Month (February)	2008
International
Super Series MVP	2007

== Records ==
- Edmonton Oilers most points in a single game – 8 (shared with Wayne Gretzky and Paul Coffey)
- Edmonton Oilers most points in a single period – 5 (shared with Jari Kurri)

Awards and achievements
Preceded by Andrew Cogliano	Edmonton Oilers first-round draft pick 2007 (first of three)	Succeeded by Alex Plante
