= Drew Doughty =

Canadian ice hockey player (born 1989)

- Doughty with the Los Angeles Kings in October 2022
- Born: December 8, 1989 (age 36) London, Ontario, Canada
- Height: 6 ft 1 in (185 cm)
- Weight: 210 lb (95 kg; 15 st 0 lb)
- Position: Defence
- Shoots: Right
- NHL team: Los Angeles Kings
- National team: Canada
- NHL draft: 2nd overall, 2008; Los Angeles Kings
- Playing career: 2008–present

Andrew Phillip "Drew" Doughty (born December 8, 1989) is a Canadian professional ice hockey player who is a defenceman and captain for the Los Angeles Kings of the National Hockey League (NHL). He was selected second overall by the Kings in the 2008 NHL entry draft from the Guelph Storm of the Ontario Hockey League (OHL), where he was twice voted the league's top offensive defenceman. He is considered to be one of the NHL's top defencemen of the 2010s.

Doughty made his NHL debut in 2008 as an 18-year-old and was named to the All-Rookie Team. He is a two-time Stanley Cup champion with the Kings in 2012 and 2014, two-time Olympic gold medallist with the Canadian national team in 2010 and 2014, 2009 World Championship silver medallist, 2008 World Junior Championship gold medalist, and a Norris Trophy finalist in 2010, 2015, 2016 and 2018, winning the trophy in 2016.

== Early life ==
Doughty was born in London, Ontario, the son of Paul and Connie Doughty. He was introduced to hockey when he was given a mini stick for his first birthday, was skating by the age of two and was playing before he was four. Doughty also played soccer in his youth as a goalkeeper – his father had a history with the game and his sister Chelsea is named after the English team of the same name. He was considered for a provincial under-14 team, but gave up the sport at 16 to focus on hockey. Nonetheless, Doughty felt that his time playing goal in soccer helped him develop an awareness of the players and the game in hockey.

== Playing career ==
=== Major junior ===
Doughty was selected by the Guelph Storm fifth overall in the 2005 Ontario Hockey League (OHL) Priority Selection draft. He scored five goals and 33 points for the Storm in 2005–06 and was named to the OHL All-Rookie Team on defence. Doughty played in the 2007 OHL All-Star Game and was voted the top offensive defenceman in the league by the coaches following a 74-point season in 2006–07. He again won both honours in 2007–08 with a 50-point season, and was awarded the Max Kaminsky Trophy as the OHL's outstanding defenceman. National Hockey League (NHL) Central Scouting ranked Doughty as the third best North American prospect for the 2008 NHL entry draft. He was selected second overall by the Los Angeles Kings, a choice that excited Doughty as he grew up a Kings fan and wanted to play in Los Angeles.

=== Los Angeles Kings (2008–present) ===
==== Early success in Los Angeles (2008–2011) ====
Doughty made the Kings opening day roster to start the 2008–09 season, one of eight 18-year-olds to do so across the league. Earning a spot on the Kings roster overwhelmed Doughty, who did not expect to play in the NHL so quickly. He made his NHL debut on October 11, 2008, against the San Jose Sharks, and scored his first goal on October 20 against the Colorado Avalanche. The Kings had the option of returning him to junior without using up one year of his rookie contract if they did so before he played his tenth NHL game. However, they chose to keep him on the roster for the season. His defensive partner, Sean O'Donnell agreed with the decision, praising Doughty's maturity. On November 6, in a game against the Florida Panthers, Doughty recorded his first NHL assist on a goal scored by Tom Preissing. He played 81 games in his rookie season, finishing with six goals and 21 assists, earning a spot on the NHL All-Rookie Team, while also playing in the Youngstars Game as part of the 2009 All-Star festivities.

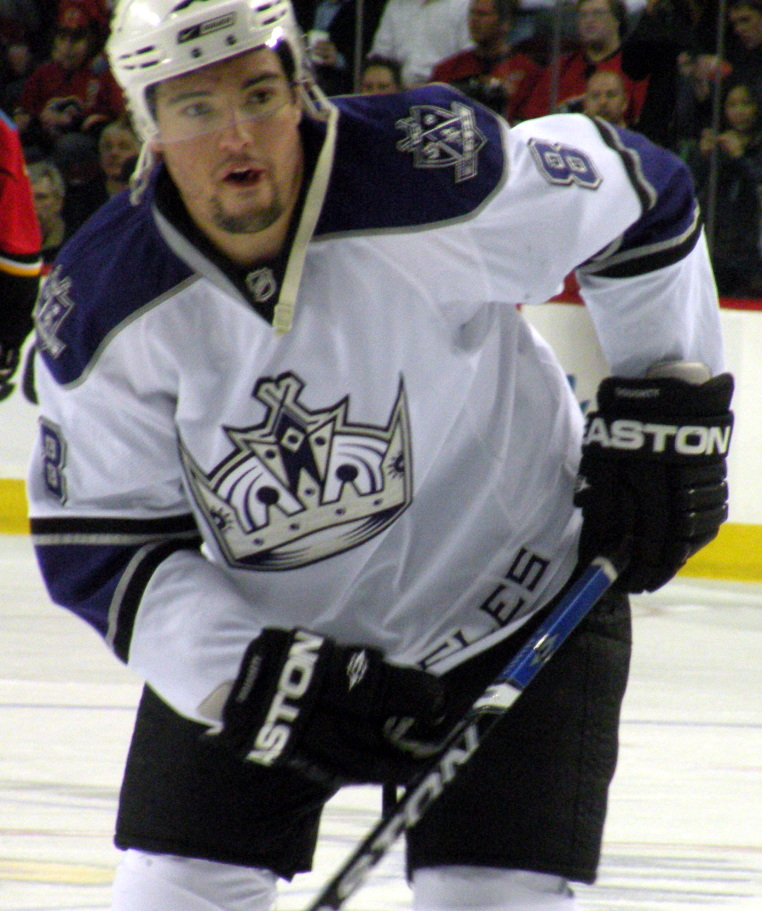
Doughty with the Kings in April 2009. The 2008–09 season was his rookie season in the NHL.

Doughty improved to 59 points in his sophomore season of 2009–10 and finished third in the league in scoring amongst defencemen. He was named to the second all-star team for the first time and was named a finalist for the Norris Trophy as the league's top defenceman, which was eventually awarded to Chicago Blackhawks defenceman Duncan Keith. His coach, Terry Murray, praised Doughty for his improvement during the season. Doughty helped lead the Kings into the playoffs for the first time since 2002, though they lost their first round series in six games to the Vancouver Canucks. He played all six games of the series and recorded his first career playoff goal in game three against goaltender Roberto Luongo despite suffering a wrist injury in the first game that forced him to decline an invitation to play for Canada at the 2010 World Championships.

The Kings' media voted Doughty the team's outstanding defenceman for the third consecutive season in 2010–11. His offensive output fell from 59 points the previous season to 40, but he scored his 100th career point on December 21, 2010, against the Colorado Avalanche. A restricted free agent following the 2010–11 season, Doughty and the Kings initially struggled to agree on a new contract. The Kings offered $6.8 million per season over seven years, but Doughty rejected the offer.

==== Stanley Cup titles (2011–2015) ====
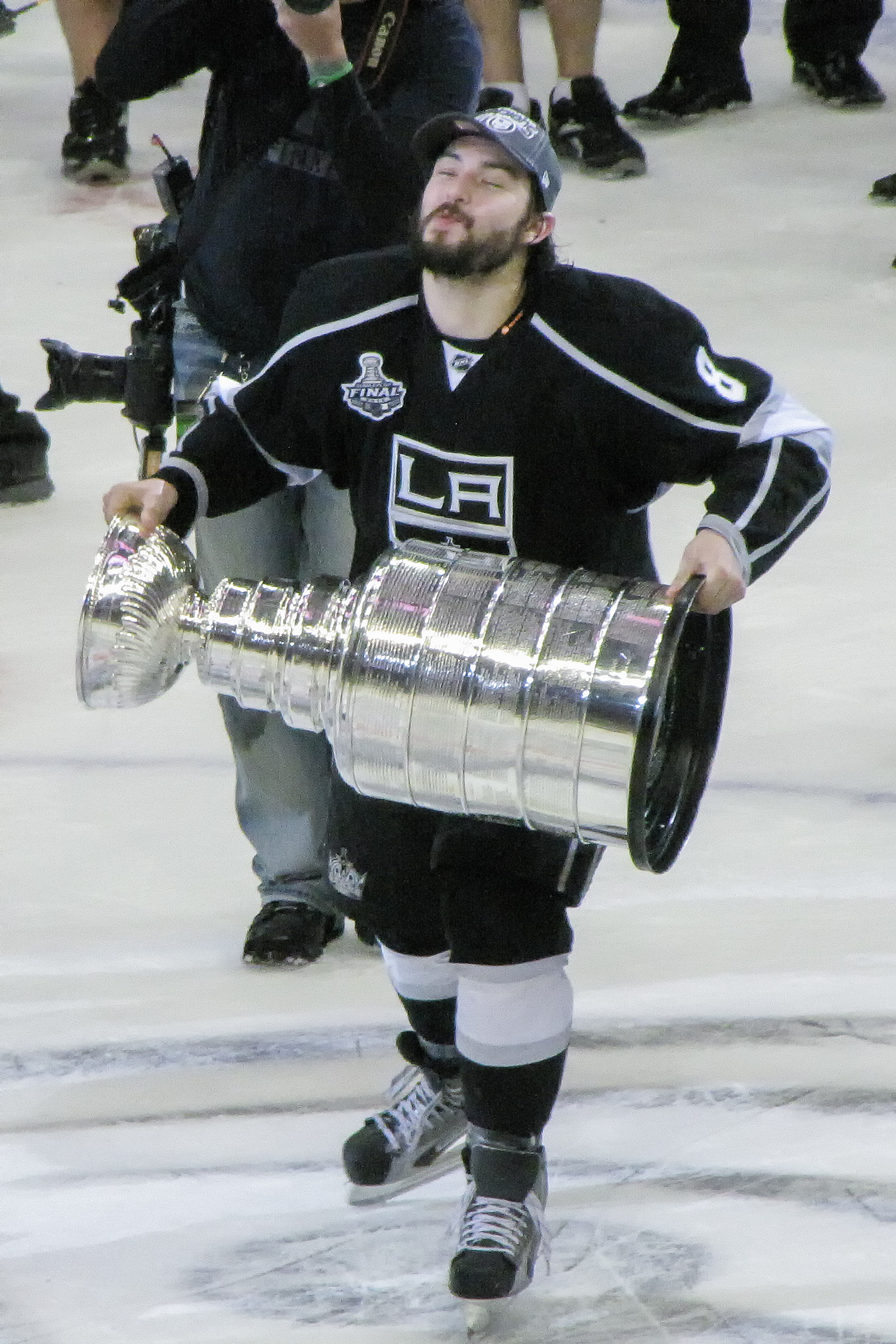
Doughty with the Stanley Cup after the Kings won Game six of the 2012 Stanley Cup Final

On September 29, 2011, Doughty and the Kings agreed on an eight-year, $56 million contract that made Doughty the highest paid player on the team at an average of $7 million per season. Doughty missed the majority of Los Angeles' training camp as a holdout, including five pre-season games, before signing the contract. In addition to missing training camp for the 2011–12 season, Doughty suffered a concussion early in the season against the Philadelphia Flyers on October 15, that forced him onto injured reserve for five games. He struggled upon his return from the injury and faced criticism that he had allowed his physical conditioning to lapse. Doughty himself admitted that he was not enjoying the game early in the season. On December 15, Doughty recorded his 100th career assist on a goal by captain Dustin Brown in a 2–1 win over the Columbus Blue Jackets. Despite his early season struggles, his season turned a corner when the team replaced Terry Murray with Darryl Sutter in December 2011 as head coach, a coach who preached the need for preparation. Doughty was elevated into a role where he was expected to shut down the opposition's top forwards, forcing him to focus more on his defensive play than his offensive. Consequently, Doughty's 36 points (10 goals, 26 assists) on the season was his lowest total in three years and the Kings would narrowly qualify for the 2012 playoffs as the eighth and final seed in the Western Conference. In the opening round of the playoffs, Doughty and the Kings defeated the back-to-back Presidents' Trophy winning Vancouver Canucks in five games before ultimately sweeping the St. Louis Blues in four games in the second round. The Kings would then defeat the Phoenix Coyotes in five games for a spot in the Stanley Cup Final for the second time in franchise history and for first time since 1993. He ended the playoffs was the top-scoring defenceman after recording four goals and 12 assists for 16 points in all 20 games to help the Kings win their first Stanley Cup championship in franchise history. Doughty was praised as the top player for either team in the 2012 Stanley Cup Final, a six-game series victory over the New Jersey Devils.

After recording six goals and 16 assists for 22 points in all 48 games and the defending Stanley Cup champion Kings as a team finished as the fifth seed in the Western Conference in the lockout-shortened 2012–13 season, Doughty and the Kings would make another lengthy playoff run in the 2013 playoffs by defeating the St. Louis Blues in the first round in six games and the San Jose Sharks in seven games before being defeated in the Western Conference Finals by the Presidents' Trophy-winning and eventual Stanley Cup champion Chicago Blackhawks in five games.

Doughty won his second Stanley Cup championship in 2014 after he and the Kings defeated the San Jose Sharks in seven games in the first round (after initially trailing 3–0 earlier in the series), the Anaheim Ducks in the second round in seven games (after initially trailing 3–2 earlier in the series) and the defending Stanley Cup Champion Chicago Blackhawks in the third round in seven games before eventually defeating the New York Rangers in five games in the Stanley Cup Final. In doing so, Doughty (along with teammate Jeff Carter) became the seventh and eighth players in league history to win both an Olympic hockey gold medal and the Stanley Cup in the same year.

On February 21, 2015 in a 2–1 win against the San Jose Sharks in the 2015 NHL Stadium Series, Doughty played his 500th NHL game. Although the defending Stanley Cup champion Kings missed the 2015 playoffs entirely by just four points, Doughty ended the 2014–15 season playing in all 82 contests with seven goals, 39 assists and 46 points and was named a finalist for the James Norris Memorial Trophy for the second time in his career with the award eventually being given to Erik Karlsson of the Ottawa Senators.

==== Norris Trophy win and continued success (2015–2023) ====
During the 2015–16 season, Doughty had a career-high plus 24 rating, while also leading the league in shot attempts and ranking third in average ice time for the Kings and played in all 82 games with 51 points (14 goals, 37 assists). At the end of the year, Doughty won the James Norris Memorial Trophy as the NHL's top defenceman. It was his second consecutive time and third time altogether for being a nominated as he finished second in voting in 2015 and third in 2010, respectively.

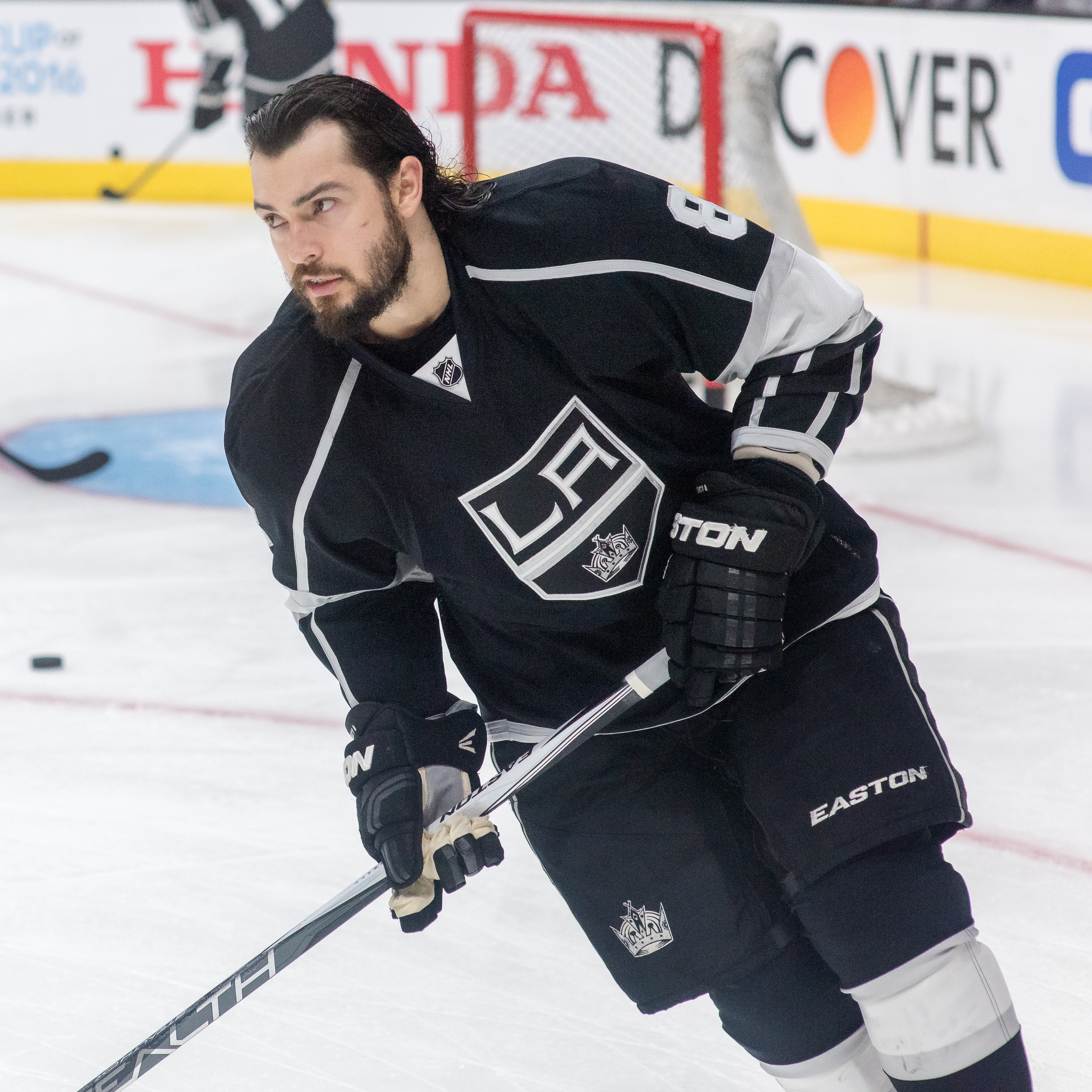
Doughty warming up prior to a playoff game in April 2016

During the 2016–17 season Doughty was selected to participate in the 2017 NHL All-Star Game (along with teammate Jeff Carter) after leading the team's defence in goals and coming in second in points.

In the 2017–18 season, Doughty was again selected to participate in the All-Star Game, marking his fourth consecutive selection. Doughty was also named a finalist for the Norris Trophy again which was eventually given to Victor Hedman of the Tampa Bay Lightning. During a game against the Dallas Stars on January 30, 2018, Doughty recorded his 100th NHL goal against Stars' goaltender Ben Bishop. During the first round of the 2018 playoffs, Doughty was suspended for one game for an illegal hit to the head during game 1 against the Vegas Golden Knights. He returned to the Kings lineup for games three and four as the Kings were eventually swept.

On July 1, 2018, Doughty agreed to an 8-year, $88 million contract extension with the Kings, which will see him signed through until the 2026–27 season.

On October 8, 2019, Doughty scored the winning goal in a game against the Calgary Flames, but it was his post-goal celebration that received media attention. Doughty allegedly yelled an expletive at Flames' fans at ice level, while performing a "crotch chop" motion made famous in professional wrestling circles.

After starting the 2021–22 season with seven points leading all NHL defencemen in scoring, on October 22, 2021, Doughty collided knee-to-knee with Dallas Stars defenceman Jani Hakanpää, suffering a tibial plateau contusion. He missed 16 games as a result, returning to game action on November 30. On January 27, 2022, Doughty played his 1,000th NHL game, in a match against the New York Islanders in which the Kings would win 3–2. He would be injured again on March 7, against the Boston Bruins, requiring season ending wrist surgery. In 39 games played, Doughty recorded seven goals, 24 assists and 31 points.

In 2022–23, Doughty rebounded from the previous injury-riddled season by recording nine goals, 43 assists and 52 points in 81 contests played. He would also record three assists but was goalless in the Kings first round exit in the 2023 playoffs by the Edmonton Oilers for the second straight season, this time in six games.

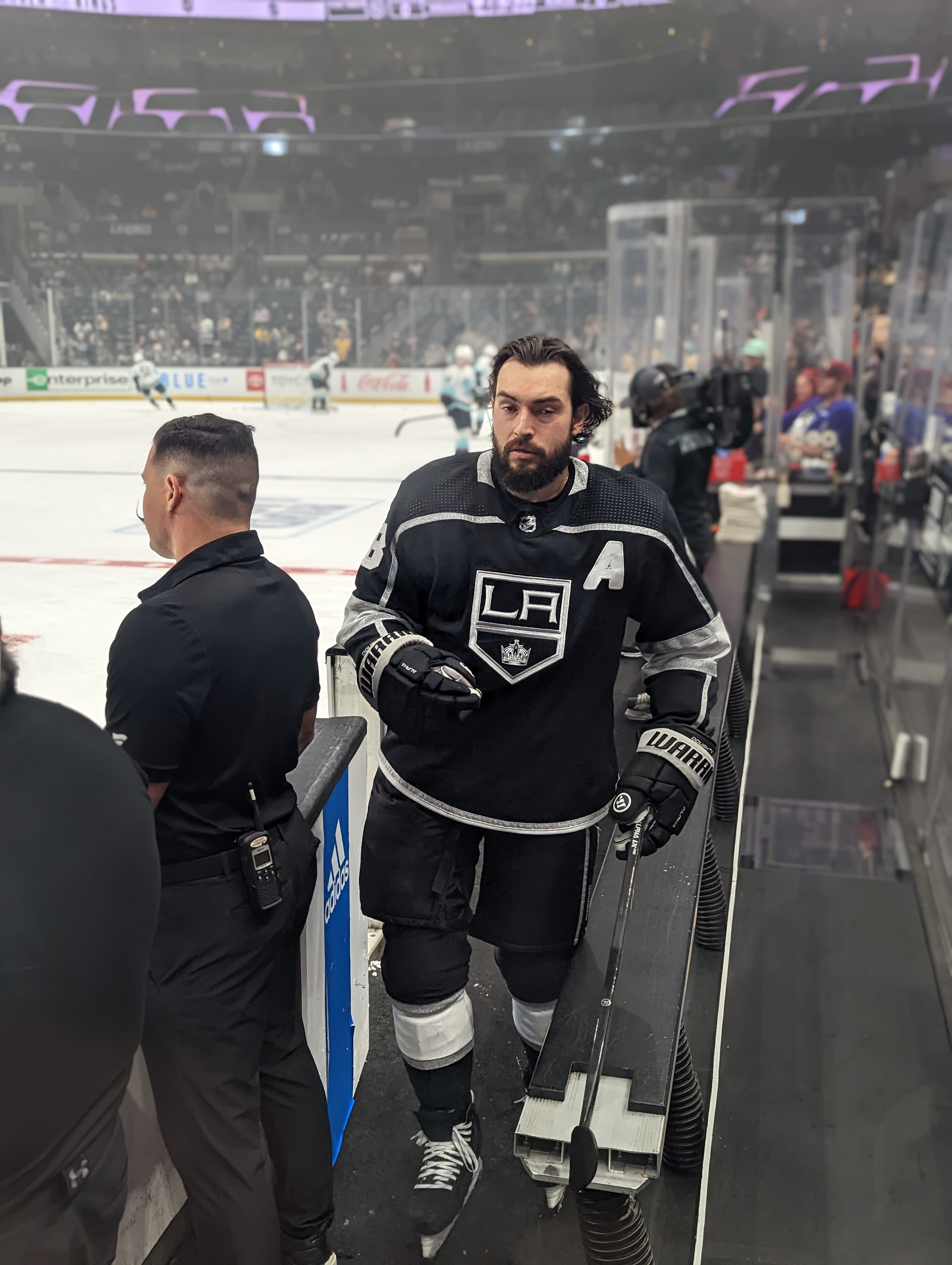
Doughty during warmups in the 2022-23 season.

==== Recent years (2023–present) ====
On October 21, 2023, in a 4–2 win over the Boston Bruins, Doughty played his 1,100th NHL game, becoming the fourth player in Kings history to hit the mark with the club. He recorded his 500th assist on February 29, 2024, on goal by Anže Kopitar in a 5–1 win over the Vancouver Canucks. Doughty ended the 2023–24 season with 15 goals and 35 assists for 50 points in all 82 contests played. As the Kings matched up against the Edmonton Oilers in the first round of the playoffs for the third straight year where the Kings would lose once more this time in five games, Doughty would record two goals and an assist for three points in all five games.

On September 25, 2024, in a pre-season game against the Vegas Golden Knights, Doughty suffered an ankle fracture after he got tied up with Knights' forward and former teammate Tanner Pearson. This injury would require surgery and would lead to him missing the majority of the 2024–25 regular season due to his recovery. On January 29, 2025, the 48th game of the season, Doughty made his season debut in a 3–0 shutout loss to the Florida Panthers.

On September 16, 2026, Doughty was named captain of the Kings, succeeding the recently-retired Kopitar.

== International play ==
Medal record

Men's ice hockey

Representing Canada

Winter Olympics
Gold medal – first place	2010 Vancouver	
Gold medal – first place	2014 Sochi	
Silver medal – second place	2026 Milano Cortina	

World Championships
Silver medal – second place	2009 Switzerland	

Canada Cup/World Cup
Gold medal – first place	2016 Toronto	

4 Nations Face-Off
Winner	2025 Canada/United States	

World Junior Championships
Gold medal – first place	2008 Czech Republic	

In 2006, Doughty played with Team Ontario at the World U-17 Hockey Challenge, finishing fifth, then won a gold medal with the national under-18 team at the Ivan Hlinka Memorial Tournament. He participated the 2007 World U18 Championships, scoring five points in six games for the fourth place Canadians, and while he was considered for the Canadian junior team for the 2007 World Junior Ice Hockey Championships, he did not make the cut. Doughty was named to participate in the 2007 Super Series, an eight-game tournament against the Russian juniors meant to commemorate the 35th anniversary of the 1972 Summit Series.

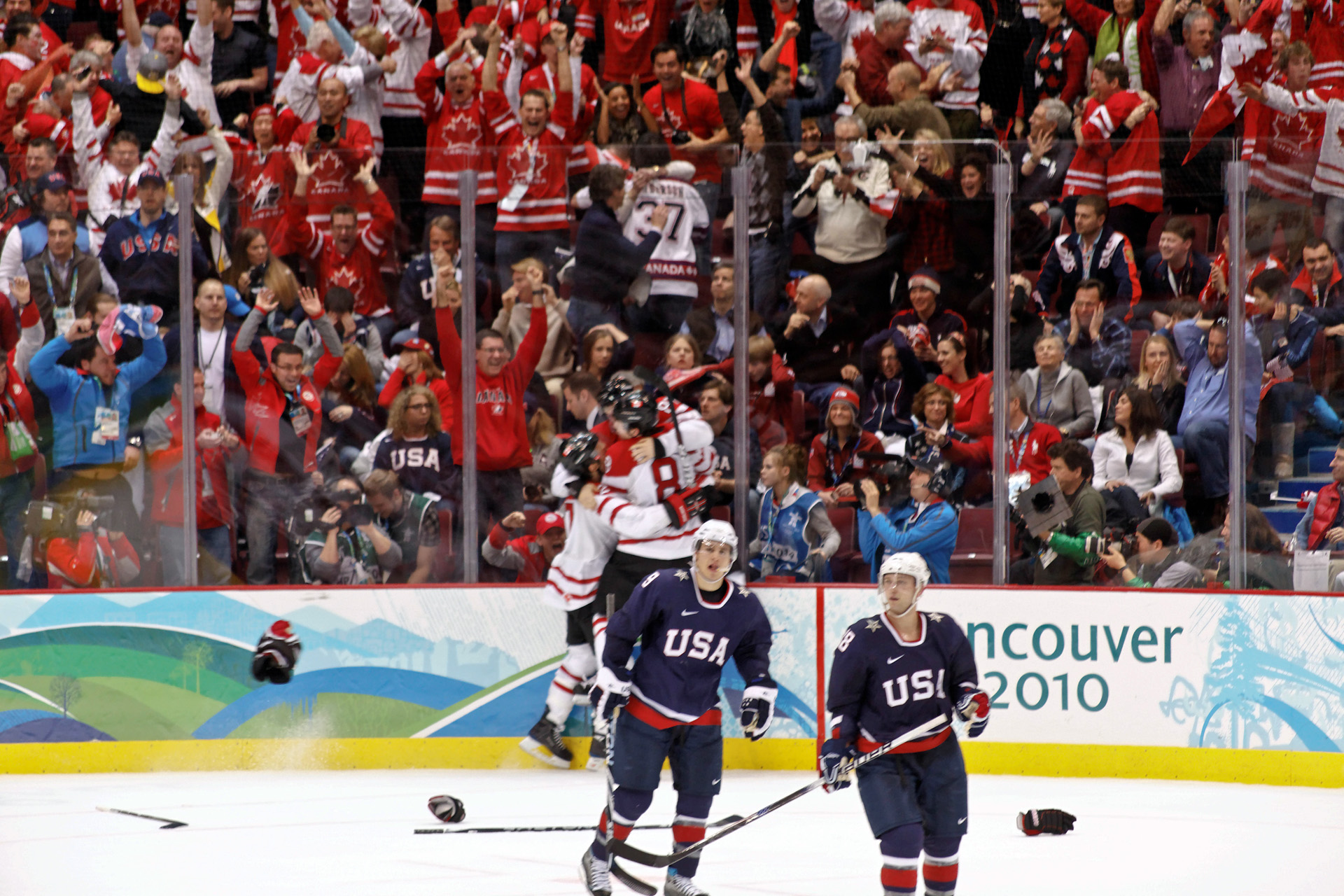
Doughty (number 8) celebrates moments after Sidney Crosby's gold-medal winning goal at the 2010 Winter Olympics over the United States.

He played in all eight games, recording two assists, as Canada finished the series unbeaten with seven wins and a tie. He then earned a spot on the roster for the 2008 World Junior Ice Hockey Championships. Doughty was named a tournament all-star, and given the Directorate Award for Best Defenceman after helping lead the Canadians to their fourth consecutive gold medal at the tournament.

Following his rookie season in the NHL, Doughty made his debut with the senior team, playing in the 2009 World Championships. He scored one goal and added six assists in nine games, however the Canadians settled for silver after losing the championship game to Russia, 2–1. His strong play in the World Championships earned Doughty an invitation to Canada's summer orientation camp for the 2010 Winter Olympics. Doughty earned one of the final spots on the Canadian defence, beating out established players such as Dion Phaneuf, Jay Bouwmeester and Mike Green. Doughty became the youngest player to represent Canada in a major best-on-best tournament since Eric Lindros participated in the 1991 Canada Cup at the age of 18. He emerged as one of the top defenders on the team, and won the gold medal as Canada defeated the United States in the final game. He was on the ice when Sidney Crosby scored the tournament-winning goal in overtime. Doughty was a star at the 2014 Winter Olympics, where Canada defended its gold medal title. He led the team with four goals and featured prominently on a defensive core which allowed only three goals in six games en route to being undefeated, one of the best team performances in Olympic history.

On December 31, 2025, he was named to Canada's roster to compete at the 2026 Winter Olympics.

== Personal life ==
Doughty's maternal grandparents immigrated to Canada from Portugal in the 1950s and his paternal grandparents immigrated to Canada from England in the 1970s.

Doughty married his high school sweetheart Nicole Arruda on August 8, 2018 in Muskoka, Ontario. Arruda later filed for divorce from Doughty on September 1, 2023, citing irreconcilable differences.

== Career statistics ==
=== Regular season and playoffs ===
			Regular season					Playoffs
Season	Team	League	GP	G	A	Pts	PIM	GP	G	A	Pts	PIM
2005–06	Guelph Storm	OHL	65	5	28	33	40	14	0	13	13	18
2006–07	Guelph Storm	OHL	67	21	53	74	76	4	2	3	5	8
2007–08	Guelph Storm	OHL	58	13	37	50	68	10	3	6	9	14
2008–09	Los Angeles Kings	NHL	81	6	21	27	56	—	—	—	—	—
2009–10	Los Angeles Kings	NHL	82	16	43	59	54	6	3	4	7	4
2010–11	Los Angeles Kings	NHL	76	11	29	40	68	6	2	2	4	8
2011–12	Los Angeles Kings	NHL	77	10	26	36	69	20	4	12	16	14
2012–13	Los Angeles Kings	NHL	48	6	16	22	36	18	2	3	5	8
2013–14	Los Angeles Kings	NHL	78	10	27	37	64	26	5	13	18	30
2014–15	Los Angeles Kings	NHL	82	7	39	46	56	—	—	—	—	—
2015–16	Los Angeles Kings	NHL	82	14	37	51	52	5	0	1	1	2
2016–17	Los Angeles Kings	NHL	82	12	32	44	46	—	—	—	—	—
2017–18	Los Angeles Kings	NHL	82	10	50	60	54	3	0	0	0	0
2018–19	Los Angeles Kings	NHL	82	8	37	45	44	—	—	—	—	—
2019–20	Los Angeles Kings	NHL	67	7	28	35	36	—	—	—	—	—
2020–21	Los Angeles Kings	NHL	56	8	26	34	26	—	—	—	—	—
2021–22	Los Angeles Kings	NHL	39	7	24	31	30	—	—	—	—	—
2022–23	Los Angeles Kings	NHL	81	9	43	52	34	6	0	3	3	4
2023–24	Los Angeles Kings	NHL	82	15	35	50	44	5	2	1	3	14
2024–25	Los Angeles Kings	NHL	30	4	13	17	20	6	1	3	4	6
2025–26	Los Angeles Kings	NHL	72	5	18	23	40	4	0	0	0	0
NHL totals			1,279	165	544	709	829	105	19	42	61	90

=== International ===
Year	Team	Event	Result	GP	G	A	Pts	PIM
2006	Canada	IH18	1st place, gold medalist(s)	4	0	4	4	6
2007	Canada	U18	4th	6	2	3	5	8
2007	Canada	SS	1st place, gold medalist(s)	8	0	2	2	4
2008	Canada	WJC	1st place, gold medalist(s)	7	0	4	4	0
2009	Canada	WC	2nd place, silver medalist(s)	9	1	6	7	4
2010	Canada	OG	1st place, gold medalist(s)	7	0	2	2	2
2014	Canada	OG	1st place, gold medalist(s)	6	4	2	6	0
2016	Canada	WCH	1st place, gold medalist(s)	6	0	2	2	2
2025	Canada	4NF	1st place, gold medalist(s)	4	0	1	1	0
2026	Canada	OG	2nd place, silver medalist(s)	6	0	1	1	0
Junior totals				25	2	13	15	18
Senior totals				38	5	14	19	8

== Awards and honours ==
Award	Year	Ref
OHL
OHL All-Rookie Team	2006	
OHL First All-Star team	2007, 2008	
Max Kaminsky Trophy	2008	
CHL first All-Star team	2008	
NHL
NHL All-Rookie Team	2009	
NHL second All-Star team	2010, 2015	
Stanley Cup champion	2012, 2014	
NHL All-Star Game	2015, 2016, 2017, 2018, 2019	
James Norris Memorial Trophy	2016	
NHL first All-Star team	2016, 2018	
International
Super Series champion	2007	
World Junior Championship Best Defenceman	2008	
World Junior Championship All-Star team	2008	
Olympic All-Star team	2014	

Awards and achievements
Preceded by Erik Karlsson	James Norris Memorial Trophy winner 2016	Succeeded by Brent Burns
Sporting positions
Preceded by Thomas Hickey	Los Angeles Kings first-round draft pick 2008	Succeeded by Colten Teubert
Preceded by Anže Kopitar	Los Angeles Kings captain 2026–present	Incumbent
