= Zach Boychuk =

Canadian ice hockey player (born 1989)

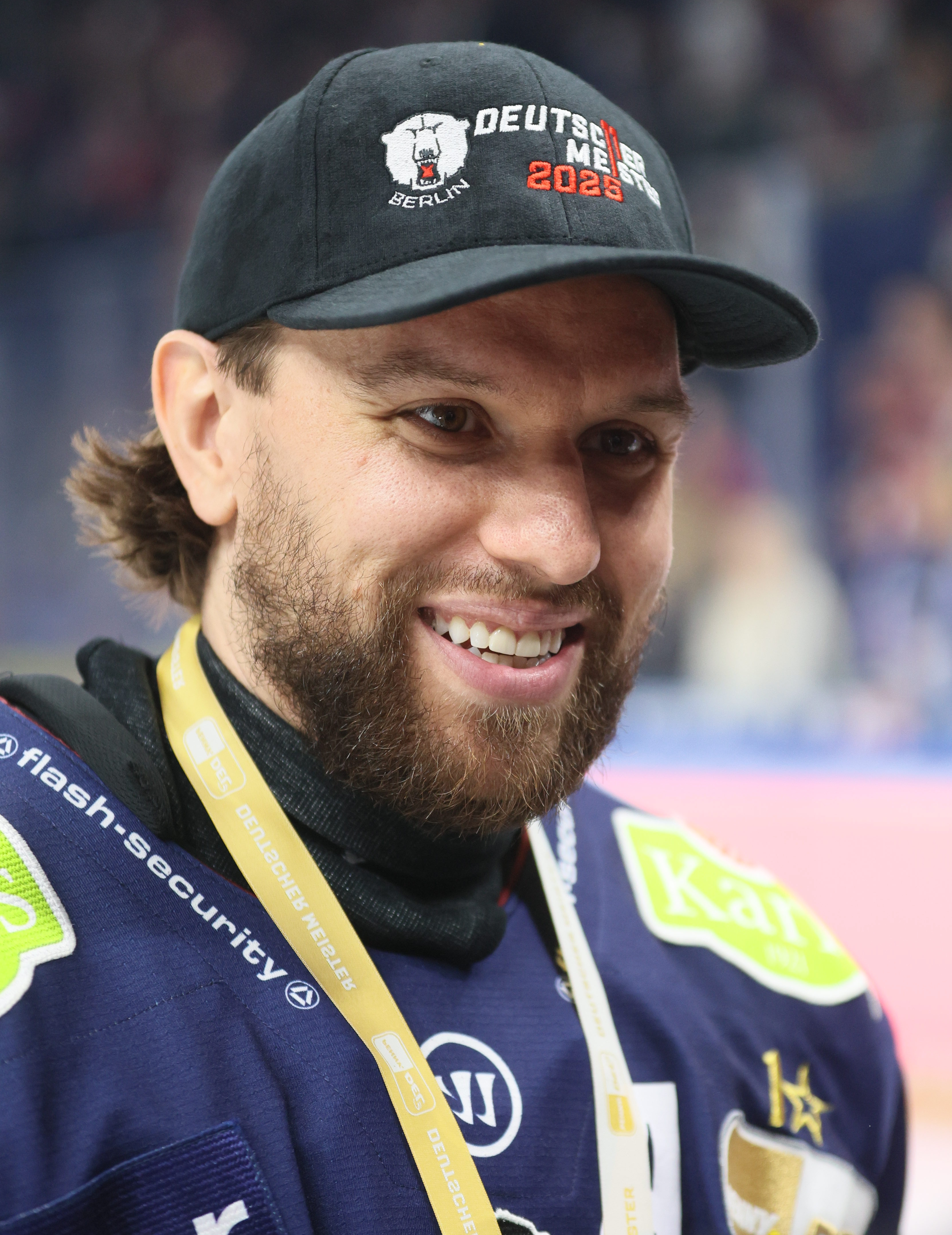
- Boychuk with the Eisbären Berlin in 2025
- Born: October 4, 1989 (age 36) Calgary, Alberta, Canada
- Height: 5 ft 10 in (178 cm)
- Weight: 176 lb (80 kg; 12 st 8 lb)
- Position: Centre
- Shoots: Left
- ICEHL team Former teams: HK Olimpija; Carolina Hurricanes; Pittsburgh Penguins; Nashville Predators; Sibir Novosibirsk; Slovan Bratislava; Severstal Cherepovets; SC Bern; Fribourg-Gottéron; Eisbären Berlin
- NHL draft: 14th overall, 2008; Carolina Hurricanes
- Playing career: 2008–present

Zachary Boychuk (born October 4, 1989) is a Canadian professional ice hockey centre for HK Olimpija Ljubljana of the ICE Hockey League (ICEHL). He was drafted by the Carolina Hurricanes in the first round, 14th overall, in the 2008 NHL entry draft and played parts of seven seasons in the NHL with Carolina Hurricanes, Pittsburgh Penguins and Nashville Predators.

He played major junior with the Lethbridge Hurricanes of the Western Hockey League (WHL). Boychuk has had a three-year career in the Kontinental Hockey League (KHL) with Sibir Novosibirsk and before moving on to Europe having won titles in Switzerland and Germany with SC Bern (2018–19), and Eisbären Berlin (2020–21, 2021–22 and 2023–24) respectively.

He has represented Canada in three Spengler Cup tournaments, winning the 2017 and 2019 editions.

== Playing career ==
=== Junior ===
Boychuk began his major junior career in 2005–06 with the Lethbridge Hurricanes of the WHL. After recording 51 points in 64 games in his rookie season, he improved to 31 goals and 91 points in 69 games the next season, third overall in the WHL.

In Boychuk's draft year, he finished with 33 goals and 72 points, good for WHL East Second All-Star honours. Leading the Hurricanes to the 2008 WHL Finals – he had 21 points in 18 playoff games – Lethbridge was, however, swept by eventual Memorial Cup winners, the Spokane Chiefs. Heading into the 2008 NHL entry draft, Boychuk was ranked eighth by the Central Scouting Service among North American skaters. He was chosen fourteenth overall by the Carolina Hurricanes.

After attending the Hurricanes' prospect camp in July, he went into surgery for his left wrist, which he had injured during the 2008 WHL playoffs. He was cleared to play during the 2008–09 NHL preseason and on October 4, 2008, the Hurricanes signed him to a three-year, entry-level contract.

=== Professional ===
==== NHL ====
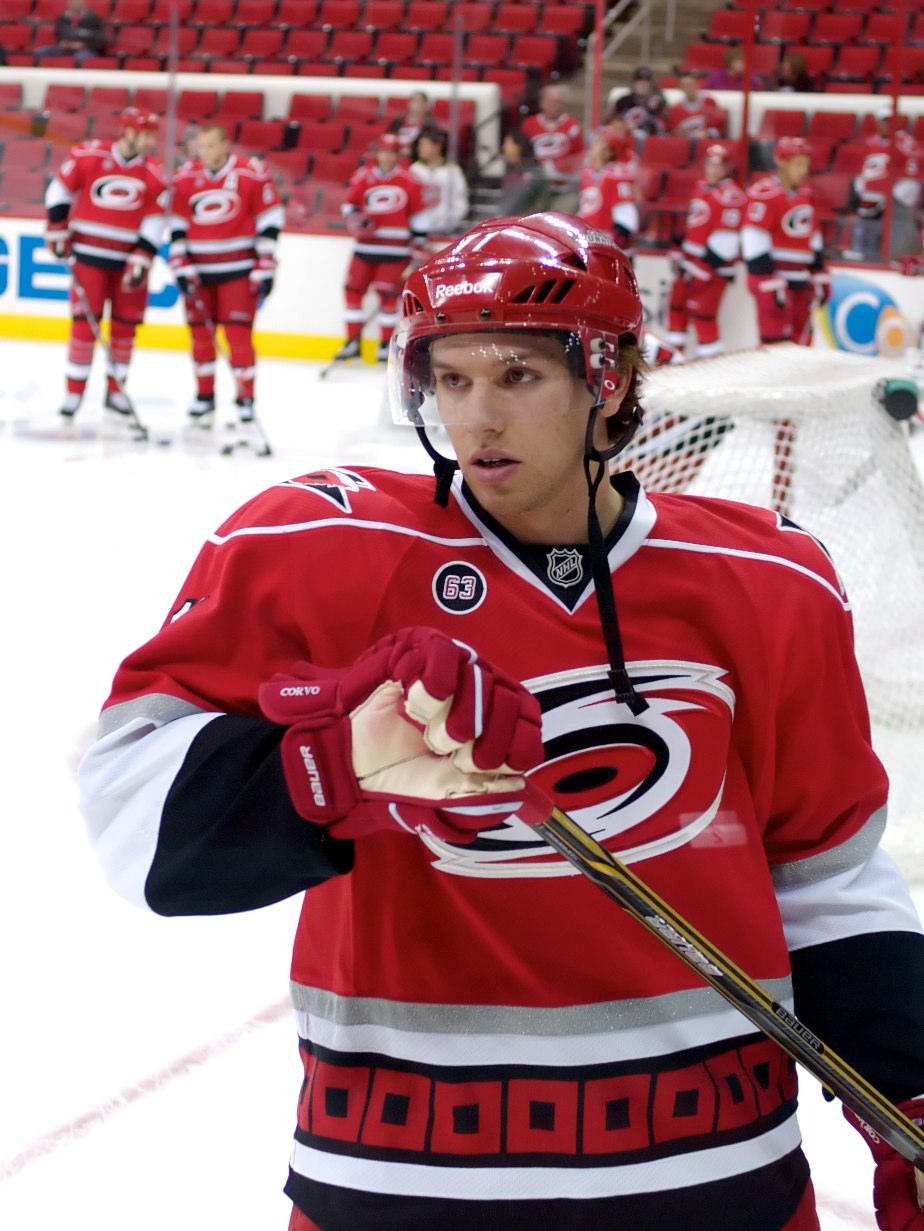
Boychuk with the Carolina Hurricanes in 2011

He made his NHL debut against the Los Angeles Kings on October 17, 2008, becoming the first Hurricanes player since Eric Staal in 2003 to make his NHL debut in his draft year. He was returned to Lethbridge after appearing in two NHL games. Upon being sent down, Boychuk completed his fourth season of WHL hockey by registering 57 points (28g, 29a) in 43 regular-season games and leading the team with 13 points (7g, 6a) in 11 playoff contests.

He shared the Harry Ingarfield Memorial Award as Lethbridge's team MVP and won the team's plus/minus award.

He was reassigned by Carolina from Lethbridge (WHL) to the Albany River Rats on April 10, 2009. At the beginning of the 2009–10 he attended the Carolina Hurricanes training camp. He made his AHL debut with Albany and recorded one assist for his first career professional point at WBS on April 10, 2009.

Boychuk registered his first NHL goal on February 13, 2010, assisted by Brandon Sutter and Brett Carson against the New Jersey Devils. It was the opening goal of the game and scored against goaltender Martin Brodeur at the 16:47 mark of the first period.

On December 29, 2010, he had his first multi-goal NHL game, with two goals, against the Ottawa Senators.

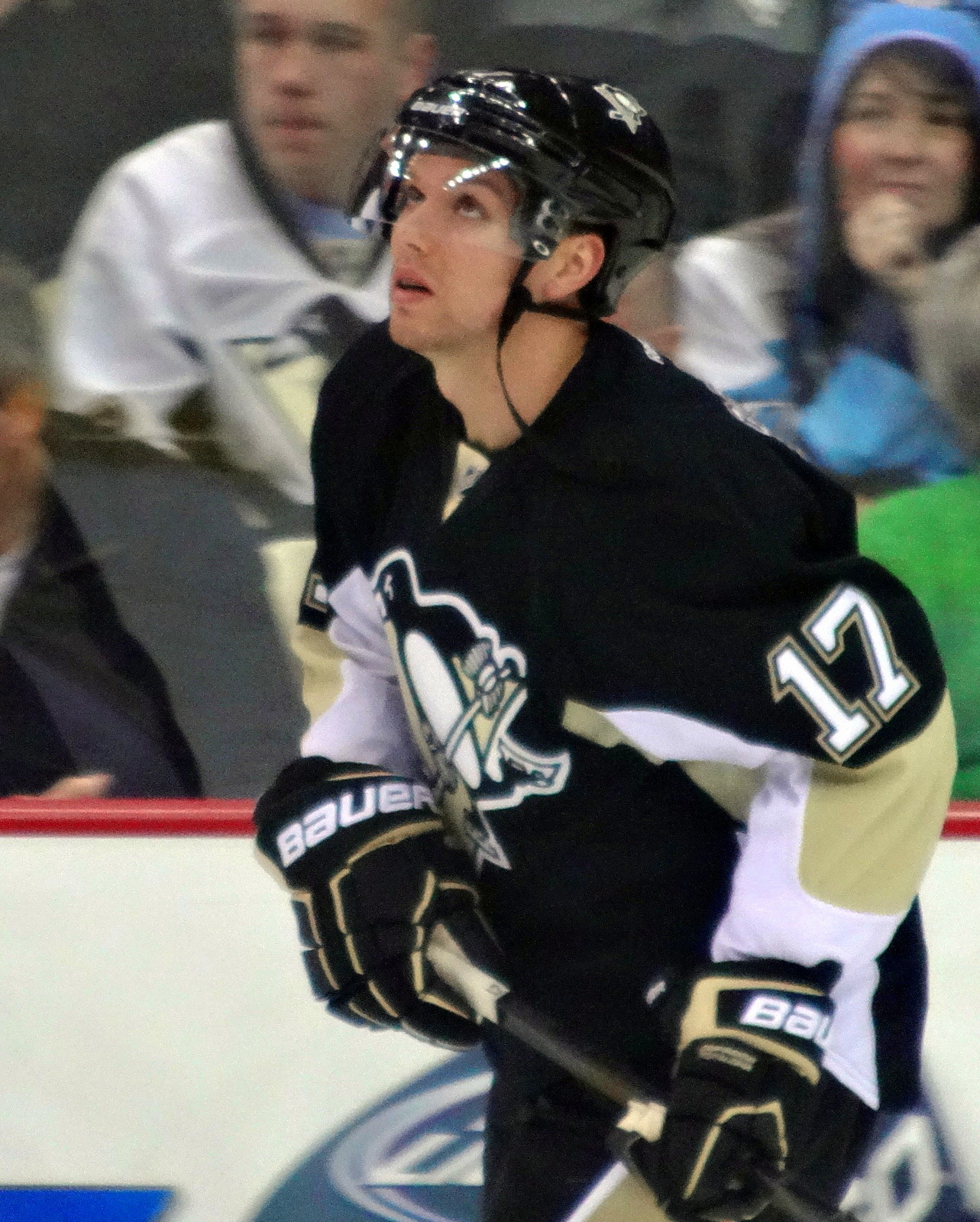
Boychuk during his first game with the Pittsburgh Penguins in 2013

During the shortened 2012–13 season, on January 31, 2013, he was claimed off waivers from the Hurricanes by the Pittsburgh Penguins. In going scoreless in seven games with the Penguins, he was again placed on waivers and subsequently claimed by the Nashville Predators on March 5, 2013. On March 21, 2013, he was re-claimed by the Hurricanes on waivers. On December 6, 2013, after starting the season in the AHL, Boychuk was recalled by the Hurricanes after an injury to veteran defenseman Mike Komisarek.

On July 7, 2015, Boychuk continued his tenure with the Hurricanes in signing a one-year, two-way contract with the club which paid him $600,000 in the NHL or $200,000 in the AHL, with his salary being guaranteed at $250,000. In the 2015–16 season, Boychuk was directly assigned to the AHL with the Checkers. Boychuk was unable to assert the impact from previous seasons with the Checkers and after producing 25 points in 56 games he was loaned by the Hurricanes to the Bakersfield Condors, the AHL affiliate to the Edmonton Oilers in exchange for Andrew Miller on March 7, 2016.

As a free agent at the expiration of his NHL contract with the Hurricanes, on September 8, 2016, Boychuk agreed to a professional try-out contract from the Arizona Coyotes to attend their training camp.

==== Europe ====
In October 2016, he agreed to his first contract abroad, playing in the Russian-based Kontinental Hockey League (KHL), one season for Sibir Novosibirsk, followed by a season tenure with Slovak entrant, Slovan Bratislava.

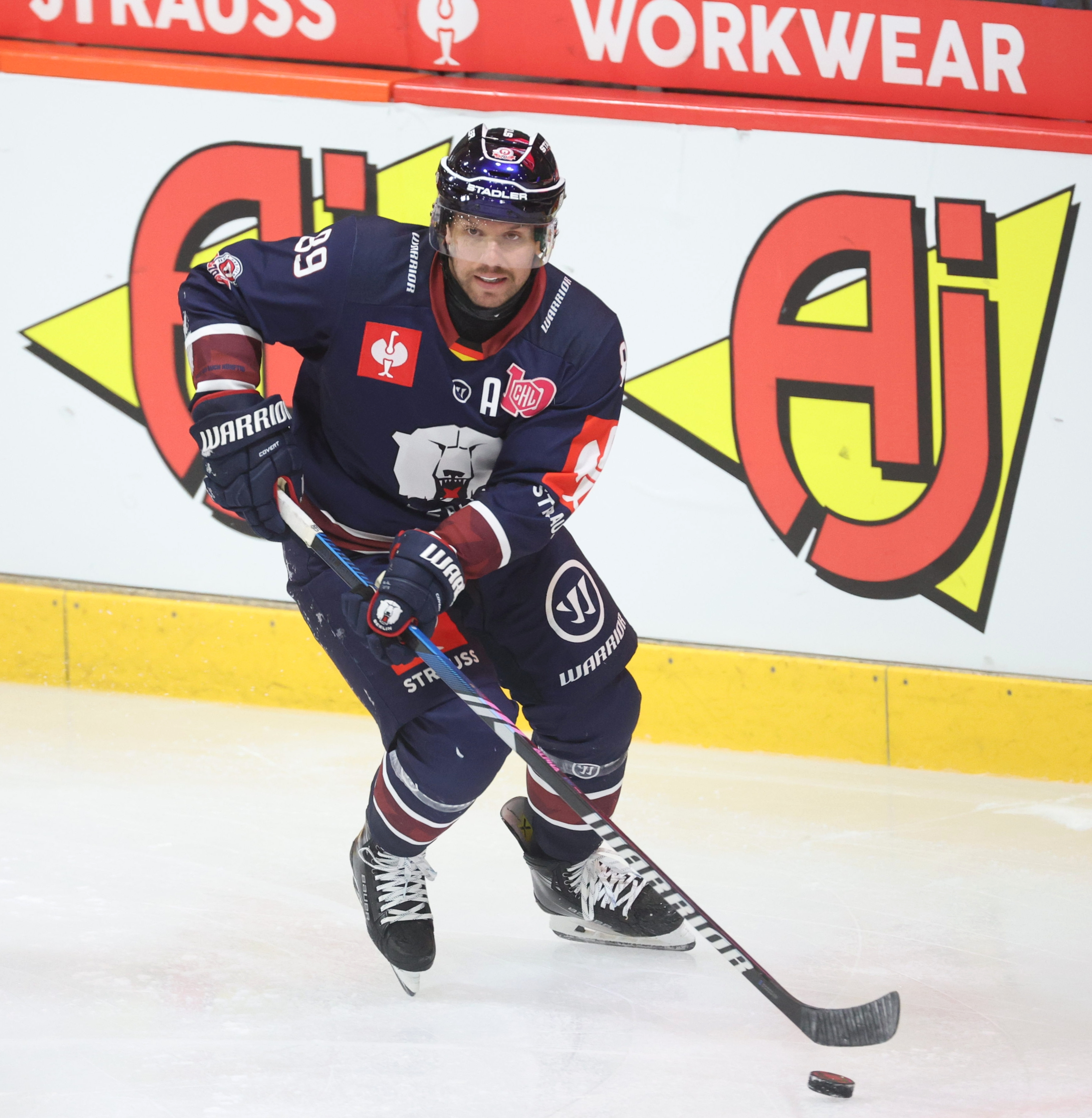
Boychuk with the Eisbären Berlin in 2024

On June 1, 2018, Boychuk joined his third KHL club in as many seasons, agreeing to a one-year deal with Russian club, Severstal Cherepovets. In the ensuing 2018–19 season, Boychuk struggled to find his place with Severstal, posting just 4 points in 25 games. On November 19, he left the KHL and signed for the remainder of the season with Swiss club, SC Bern of the National League (NL). SC Bern won the NL championship in 2019 and Boychuk assisted on the championship-winning goal scored by Eric Blum.

On December 27, 2019, Boychuk joined Switzerland's Fribourg-Gottéron of the NL for the remainder of the 2019–20 season as a replacement for injured David Desharnais.

On January 20, 2021, Boychuk signed a contract to play with Eisbären Berlin of the German DEL for the rest of the 2020–21 season. Boychuk went on to play five seasons with Eisbären, winning four DEL titles during his time in Berlin.

On May 19, 2025, Boychuk signed a one-year contract with HK Olimpija Ljubljana, a Slovenian-based club in the International Central European Hockey League, or ICEHL.

== International play ==
Medal record

Representing Canada

Ice hockey

World Junior Championships
Gold medal – first place	2008 Czech Republic	
Gold medal – first place	2009 Canada	

Spengler Cup
Gold medal – first place	2017 Davos	
Gold medal – first place	2019 Davos	

Prior to Boychuk's draft year in 2007–08, he competed in the 2007 Super Series, an under-20 eight-game series between Russia and Canada junior team. The series marked the 35th anniversary of the 1972 Summit Series between Canada senior team and the Soviet Union senior team. Boychuk contributed four goals and two assists in seven games as Canada dominated and eventually won the series 7–0–1.

Boychuk also competed for Canada in the 2008 and 2009 World Junior Championships, serving as alternate captain in the 2009 tournament, helping Canada to a fourth and fifth straight gold medal.

In late December 2017, he helped Canada win the 2017 Spengler Cup, scoring one goal in the championship game.

== Personal life ==
Boychuk's twin sister Corissa Boychuk was an international trampolinist who won medals at world championships between 2009 and 2013. She retired after the 2013 world championship. They also have a younger sister Chelsie who does competitive gymnastics.

Boychuk is known for his social media presence, boasting a high number of followers on platforms like X and Instagram, and has more followers than several ice hockey stars despite his limited NHL playing career. He intentionally follows hundreds of thousands of people and follows up to several thousand new people per day on X, under the expectation that following more people will increase the number of followers he has, which he in turn uses to secure sponsorships to promote products as an influencer. Boychuk is also an active cryptocurrency trader.

== Career statistics ==
=== Regular season and playoffs ===
			Regular season					Playoffs
Season	Team	League	GP	G	A	Pts	PIM	GP	G	A	Pts	PIM
2004–05	UFA Bisons AAA	AMHL	36	13	27	18	16	10	5	15	0
2005–06	Lethbridge Hurricanes	WHL	64	18	33	51	30	6	0	5	5	2
2006–07	Lethbridge Hurricanes	WHL	69	31	60	91	52	—	—	—	—	—
2007–08	Lethbridge Hurricanes	WHL	61	33	39	72	80	18	13	8	21	6
2008–09	Carolina Hurricanes	NHL	2	0	0	0	0	—	—	—	—	—
2008–09	Lethbridge Hurricanes	WHL	43	28	29	57	22	11	7	6	13	12
2008–09	Albany River Rats	AHL	2	0	1	1	2	—	—	—	—	—
2009–10	Carolina Hurricanes	NHL	31	3	6	9	2	—	—	—	—	—
2009–10	Albany River Rats	AHL	52	15	21	36	24	8	3	2	5	4
2010–11	Charlotte Checkers	AHL	60	22	43	65	48	16	3	6	9	14
2010–11	Carolina Hurricanes	NHL	23	4	3	7	4	—	—	—	—	—
2011–12	Charlotte Checkers	AHL	64	21	23	44	46	—	—	—	—	—
2011–12	Carolina Hurricanes	NHL	16	0	2	2	0	—	—	—	—	—
2012–13	Charlotte Checkers	AHL	49	23	20	43	16	5	3	3	6	4
2012–13	Carolina Hurricanes	NHL	1	0	0	0	0	—	—	—	—	—
2012–13	Pittsburgh Penguins	NHL	7	0	0	0	2	—	—	—	—	—
2012–13	Nashville Predators	NHL	5	1	1	2	4	—	—	—	—	—
2013–14	Charlotte Checkers	AHL	69	36	38	74	55	—	—	—	—	—
2013–14	Carolina Hurricanes	NHL	11	1	3	4	0	—	—	—	—	—
2014–15	Carolina Hurricanes	NHL	31	3	3	6	4	—	—	—	—	—
2014–15	Charlotte Checkers	AHL	39	12	12	24	14	—	—	—	—	—
2015–16	Charlotte Checkers	AHL	56	9	16	25	24	—	—	—	—	—
2015–16	Bakersfield Condors	AHL	16	3	2	5	16	—	—	—	—	—
2016–17	Sibir Novosibirsk	KHL	35	7	8	15	20	—	—	—	—	—
2017–18	Slovan Bratislava	KHL	35	11	13	24	38	—	—	—	—	—
2018–19	Severstal Cherepovets	KHL	25	2	2	4	8	—	—	—	—	—
2018–19	SC Bern	NL	22	5	6	11	12	8	0	3	3	4
2019–20	HC Fribourg–Gottéron	NL	15	3	10	13	2	—	—	—	—	—
2020–21	Eisbären Berlin	DEL	26	12	13	25	20	8	3	6	9	4
2021–22	Eisbären Berlin	DEL	36	15	10	25	32	11	7	2	9	8
2022–23	Eisbären Berlin	DEL	56	17	29	46	56	—	—	—	—	—
2023–24	Eisbären Berlin	DEL	51	23	21	44	61	15	3	8	11	12
2024–25	Eisbären Berlin	DEL	46	12	23	35	32	10	4	1	5	31
NHL totals			127	12	18	30	16	—	—	—	—	—
KHL totals			95	20	24	44	66	—	—	—	—	—
NL totals			37	8	16	24	14	8	0	3	3	4
DEL totals			215	79	96	175	201	44	17	17	34	57

=== International ===
Year	Team	Event	Result	GP	G	A	Pts	PIM
2006	Canada Pacific	U17	4th	6	1	3	4	4
2006	Canada	IH18	1st place, gold medalist(s)	4	0	2	2	4
2007	Canada	WJC18	4th	6	4	3	7	4
2007	Canada	SS	1st place, gold medalist(s)	7	4	2	6	12
2008	Canada	WJC	1st place, gold medalist(s)	7	0	0	0	2
2009	Canada	WJC	1st place, gold medalist(s)	6	3	4	7	0
Junior totals				29	8	12	20	14

== Awards and honours ==
Award	Year	Ref
WHL
East Second All-Star Team	2007, 2008	
AHL
Second All-Star Team	2014	
NL
Champion	2019	
DEL
Champion	2021, 2022, 2024	

Awards and achievements
Preceded by Brandon Sutter	Carolina Hurricanes first-round draft pick 2008	Succeeded by Philippe Paradis
