= Ufa Arena =

Multi-purpose arena in Ufa, Russia

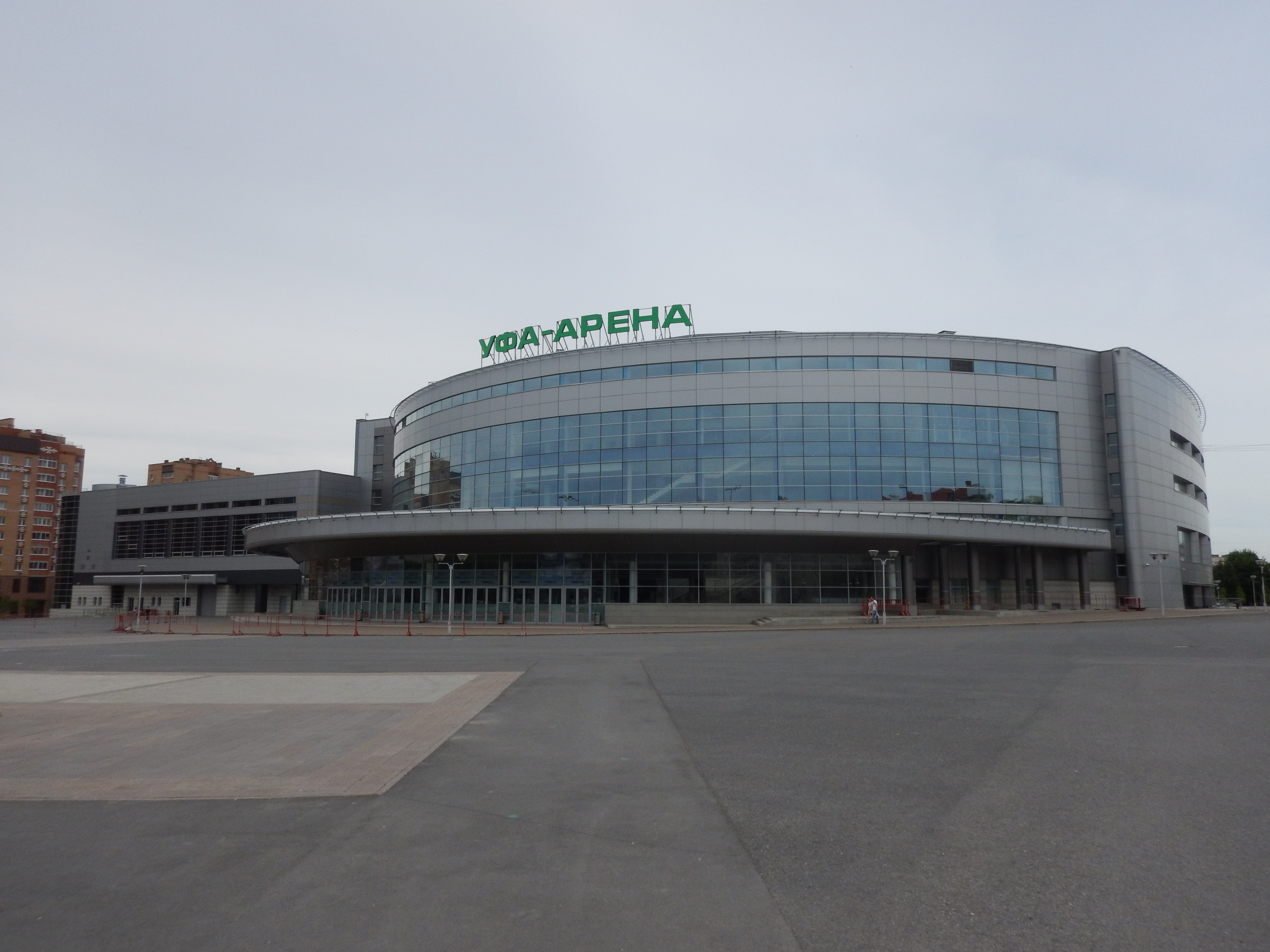
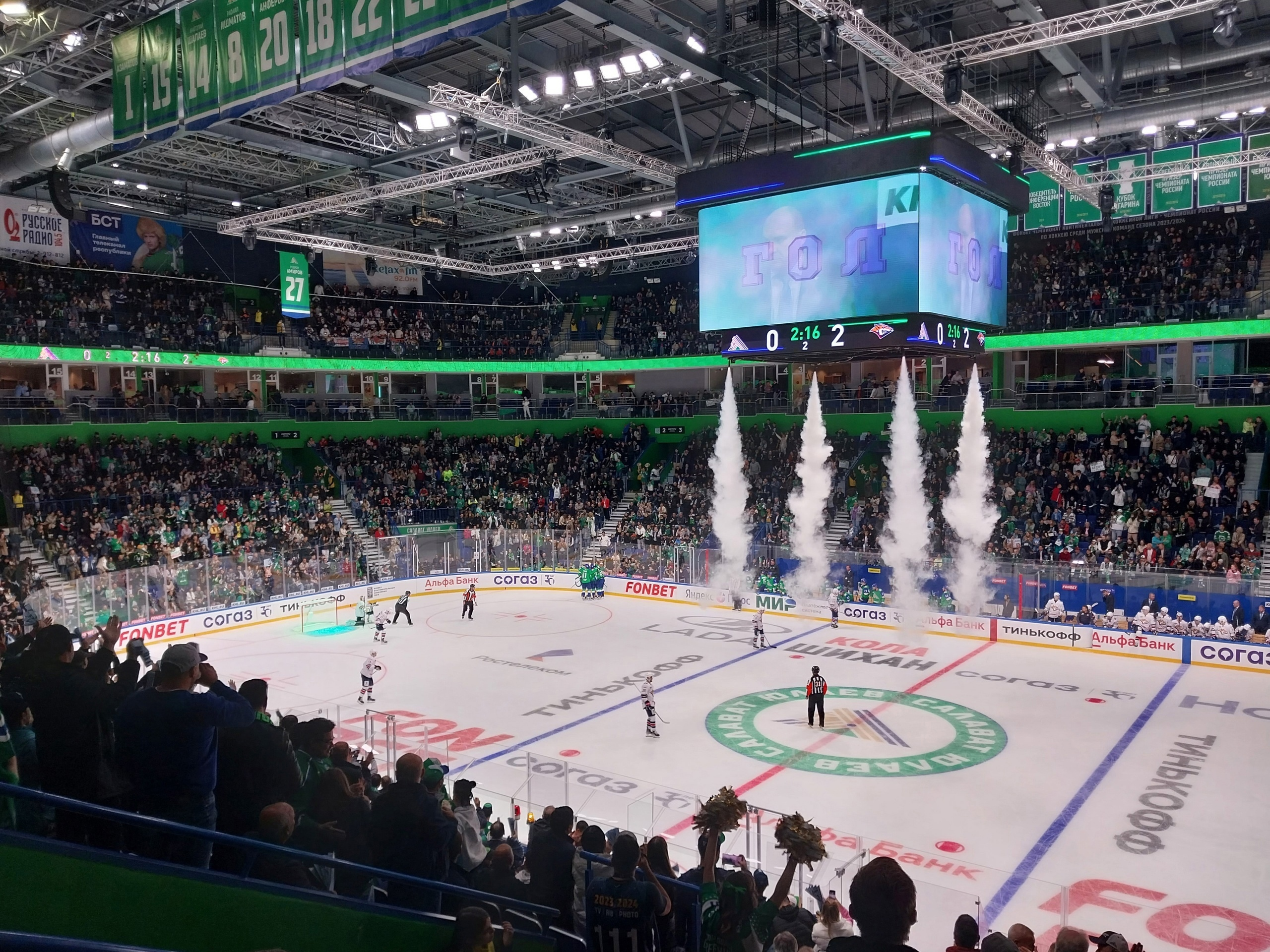
- Interactive map of Ufa Arena
- Location: 114 Lenin Street, Ufa, Bashkortostan, Russia
- Coordinates: 54°44′22″N 55°57′26″E
- Elevation: (Floor count; 5)
- Owner: Government of Bashkortostan
- Capacity: 8 522; 640 (small ice rink)
- Type: Multifunctional ice Arena
- Field size: 60 × 28 m (2020 – present); 60 × 30 m (2007-2020); 60 × 30 m (small ice rink)
- Acreage: 29 070 sq.m 8 300 sq.m (small ice rink)
- Parking: 996 cars (ground); 222 cars (small ice rink)

Construction
- Built: February 2006 – August 2007; April 2010 – November 2011 (small ice rink)
- Opened: 27 August 2007; 19 years ago 20 November 2011; 14 years ago (small ice rink)
- Renovated: December 2016; September 2019; August 2020; December 2022
- Cost: ₽ 2,4 billion (€ 68,5 million in 2007) Renovated 2016: ₽ 103 million (€ 1,4 million in 2016) Small ice rink: ₽ 562 million (€ 13,9 million in 2011)
- Architects: Ildar Ibragimov and Vladimir Savenko of Architectural Workshop No. 1 (Bashkirgrazhdanproekt Design Institute)
- Builder: Government of Bashkortostan
- General contractors: Сonstruction trust of JSC KPD; Municipal Unitary Enterprise Ufa Investment and Construction Committee(small ice rink)

Tenants
- Salavat Yulaev Ufa (KHL) (2007–present); Tolpar Ufa (MHL) (2009-present)

Website
- Venue Website

The Ufa Arena is an 8,522-seat multi-purpose arena in Ufa, Russia that opened in 2007. It was built on the site of the Trud Stadium (Ufa), which was demolished in 2005. The Ufa Arena replaced Ice Palace Salavat Yulaev as the home of Kontinental Hockey League ice hockey team, Salavat Yulaev Ufa.

The first events in the arena were the first two games of the 2007 Super Series, a hockey series between Canada and Russia juniors. Due to the incomplete construction of the arena, issues arose regarding paint fumes, melting ice, and fog

The arena was the primary venue for the 2013 World Junior Ice Hockey Championships, which was played from the last week of December, 2012 until the first week of January, 2013.

== See also ==
- List of indoor arenas in Russia
