= List of players with eight or more points in an NHL game =

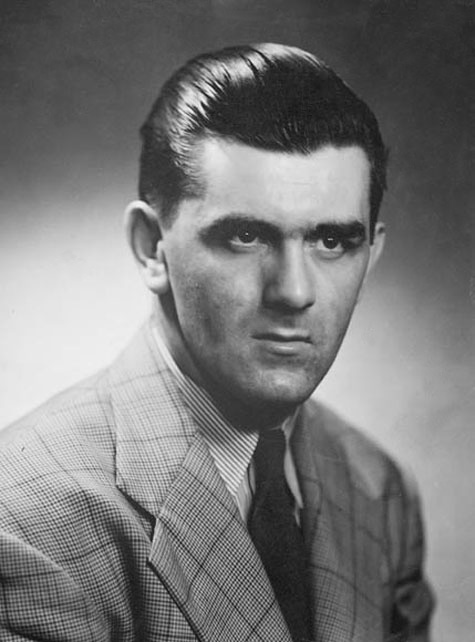
Maurice "Rocket" Richard recorded the first eight-point game in league history.

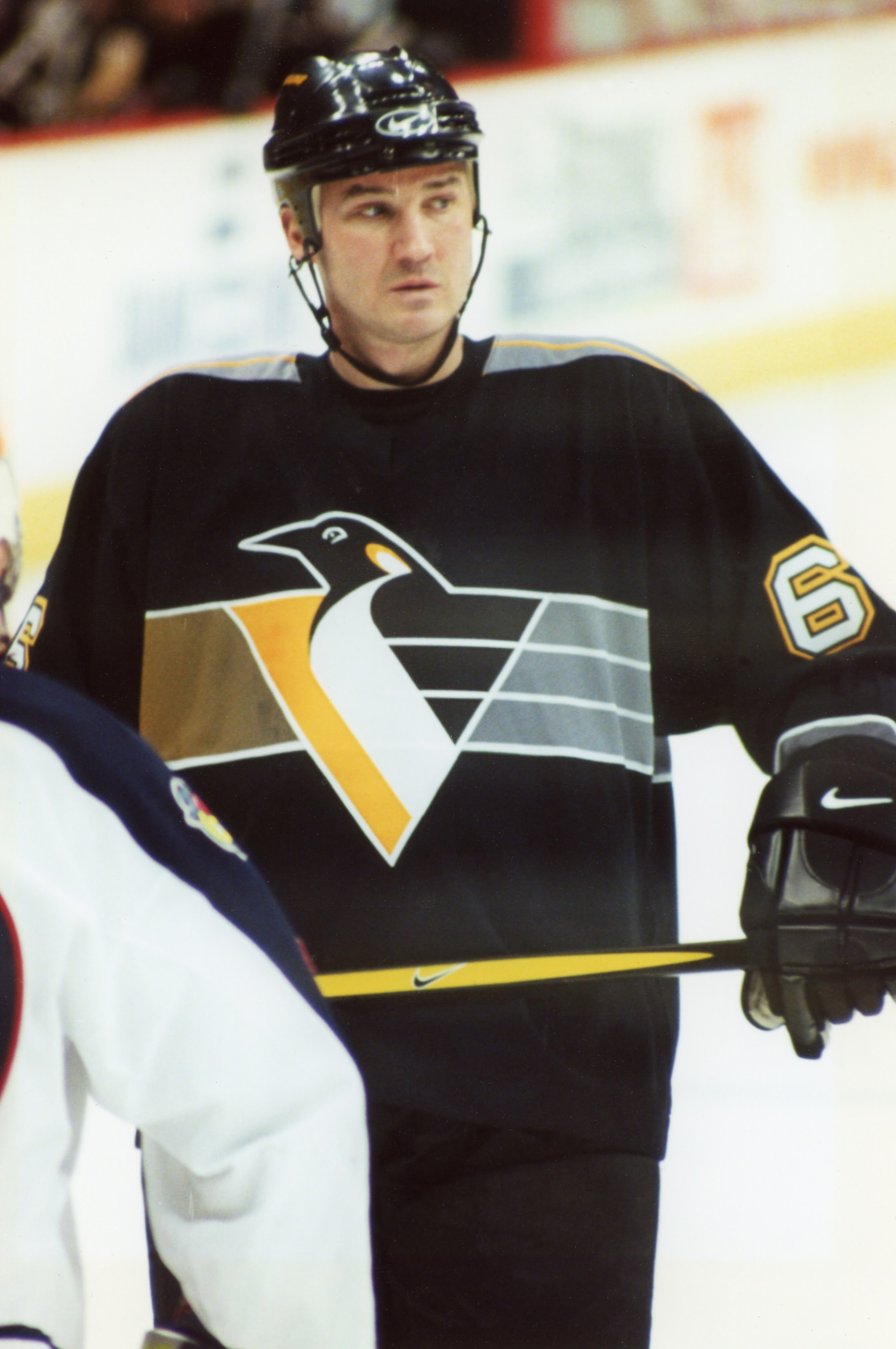
Mario Lemieux recorded three eight-point games.

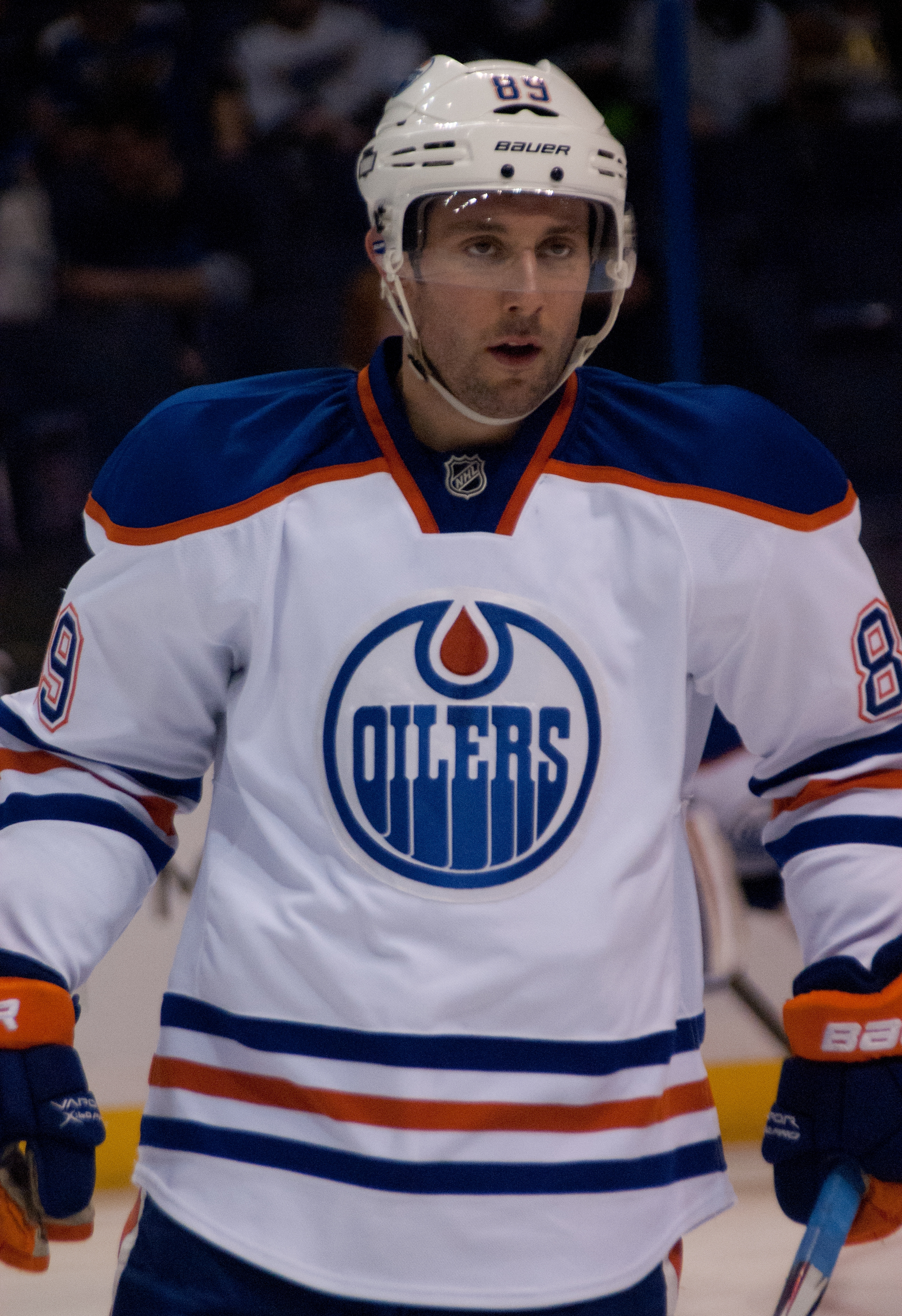
Sam Gagner is the most recent NHL player to have an eight-point game.

This is a list of players who have scored eight or more points in a National Hockey League game. Scoring eight or more points in a single game is considered a great feat and has happened only 16 times, by 13 players. Only one player, Darryl Sittler, scored more than eight points in a game, setting the NHL record with 10 while playing for the Toronto Maple Leafs in 1976. Paul Coffey and Tom Bladon are the only defensemen to have scored eight points. The feat of scoring eight points in a game was mostly achieved in the 1980s, with 10 out of the 16 instances happening in that decade. Mario Lemieux has the most games with at least eight points, scoring eight points in three separate games (in one season). Wayne Gretzky is the only other player to attain the feat more than once (twice, in one season). The most recent player to do so was Sam Gagner of the Edmonton Oilers, who scored eight points against the Chicago Blackhawks on 2 February 2012; Gagner's 8-point night was also the first eight-point game for a player since the 1980s.

== Scorers ==
Legend

Player is still active in the NHL
Points were scored in a playoff game

Name	Position	Team	Date	Goals	Assists	Points
(Canada) Maurice Richard	Right wing	Montreal Canadiens	28 December 1944	5	3	8
(Canada) Bert Olmstead	Left wing	Montreal Canadiens	9 January 1954	4	4	8
(Canada) Darryl Sittler	Center	Toronto Maple Leafs	7 February 1976	6	4	10
(Canada) Tom Bladon	Defense	Philadelphia Flyers	11 December 1977	4	4	8
(Canada) Bryan Trottier	Center	New York Islanders	23 December 1978	5	3	8
(Slovakia) Peter Šťastný	Center	Quebec Nordiques	22 February 1981	4	4	8
(Slovakia) Anton Šťastný	Left wing	Quebec Nordiques	22 February 1981	3	5	8
(Canada) Wayne Gretzky	Center	Edmonton Oilers	19 November 1983	3	5	8
(Canada) Wayne Gretzky	Center	Edmonton Oilers	4 January 1984	4	4	8
(Canada) Paul Coffey	Defense	Edmonton Oilers	14 March 1986	2	6	8
(Sweden) Patrik Sundström	Center	New Jersey Devils	22 April 1988	3	5	8
(Canada) Mario Lemieux	Center	Pittsburgh Penguins	15 October 1988	2	6	8
(Canada) Bernie Nicholls	Center	Los Angeles Kings	1 December 1988	2	6	8
(Canada) Mario Lemieux	Center	Pittsburgh Penguins	31 December 1988	5	3	8
(Canada) Mario Lemieux	Center	Pittsburgh Penguins	25 April 1989	5	3	8
(Canada) Sam Gagner	Center	Edmonton Oilers	2 February 2012	4	4	8
