= Valeri Zhukov =

Russian ice hockey player

- Born: February 8, 1988 (age 37); Nizhny Novgorod, Russian SFSR, Soviet Union
- Height: 6 ft 0 in (183 cm)
- Weight: 203 lb (92 kg; 14 st 7 lb)
- Position: Defence
- Shoots: Left
- ALIH team Former teams: PSK Sakhalin; Torpedo Nizhny Novgorod
- Playing career: 2003–present

Valeri Zhukov (sometimes listed as Valery Zhukov) (born February 8, 1988) is a professional ice hockey player who plays for PSK Sakhalin in the Asia League Ice Hockey (ALIH). He has formerly played with Torpedo Nizhny Novgorod in the Kontinental Hockey League (KHL).
