= Vyacheslav Solodukhin =

Russian ice hockey player (1950–1979)

- Born: November 11, 1950 Leningrad, Russian SFSR, Soviet Union
- Died: December 1979 (age 29) Leningrad, Russian SFSR, Soviet Union
- Height: 5 ft 11 in (180 cm)
- Weight: 187 lb (85 kg; 13 st 5 lb)
- Position: Centre
- Shot: Left
- Played for: SKA Leningrad
- National team: Soviet Union
- Playing career: 1967–1979

Viacheslav Solodukhin (November 11, 1950 in Leningrad, Russia – December 1979) was a professional ice hockey player who played in the Soviet Hockey League. He played for SKA St. Petersburg. He also played for the Soviet team during the 1972 Summit Series against Canada.

Solodukhin committed suicide in 1979 in his car by carbon monoxide poisoning.
