= 2006 World U-17 Hockey Challenge =

The 2006 World U-17 Hockey Challenge was an ice hockey tournament for under-17 players held in Saskatchewan, Canada between December 29, 2005 and January 4, 2006. Canada Quebec defeated the United States 5–2 in the final to claim the gold medal, while the Czech Republic defeated Canada Pacific 5–4 in a shootout to capture the bronze medal.

Games were held in Balgonie, Fort Qu'Appelle, Indian Head, Milestone, Moose Jaw, Regina, Southey, and Weyburn.

== Challenge results ==
=== Preliminary round ===
==== Group A ====
Team	Pld	W	L	D	GF	GA	GD	Pts
Canada Quebec	4	3	1	0	14	15	−1	9
United States	4	2	1	1	15	11	+4	7
Canada Ontario	4	2	2	0	24	16	+8	6
Canada West	4	1	2	1	8	13	−5	4
Slovakia	4	1	3	0	10	16	−6	3

==== Group B ====
Team	Pld	W	L	D	GF	GA	GD	Pts
Canada Pacific	4	4	0	0	32	11	+21	12
Czech Republic	4	1	1	2	13	14	−1	5
Canada Atlantic	4	1	1	2	17	20	−3	5
Finland	4	0	2	2	5	11	−6	2
Germany	4	0	2	2	10	21	−11	2

=== Final round ===
Semi finals
A1	Canada Quebec	2
B2	Czech Republic	1
B1	Canada Pacific	4
A2	United States	8

Final
SF1	Canada Quebec	5
SF2	United States	2

=== Final standings ===
	Team
1	Canada Quebec
2	United States
3	Czech Republic
4	Canada Pacific
5	Canada Ontario
6	Canada Atlantic
7	Canada West
8	Finland
9	Slovakia
10	Germany
