= 2018 IIHF World Championship Division I =

International ice hockey tournament

Tournament details
- Host countries: Hungary; Lithuania
- Venues: 2 (in 2 host cities)
- Dates: 22–28 April
- Teams: 12

The 2018 IIHF World Championship Division I was an international ice hockey tournament run by the International Ice Hockey Federation.

The Group A tournament was held in Budapest, Hungary and the Group B tournament was held in Kaunas, Lithuania from 22 to 28 April 2018. Warsaw, Poland planned on bidding for the tournament, but as Poland had hosted both the 2015 and 2016 tournaments, decided to apply for a later year.

Great Britain and Italy were promoted to the Top Division, while Poland was relegated to Division I B. The Group B tournament was won by Lithuania, who moved up to Group A and Croatia was relegated to Division II.

== Group A tournament ==
2018 IIHF World Championship Division I A

Tournament details
- Host country: Hungary
- Venue: 1 (in 1 host city)
- Dates: 22–28 April
- Teams: 6

Tournament statistics
- Games played: 15
- Goals scored: 84 (5.6 per game)
- Attendance: 52,065 (3,471 per game)
- Scoring leader: (Kazakhstan) Roman Starchenko (8 points)

Official website
- IIHF.com

=== Participants ===
Team	Qualification
Slovenia	Placed 15th in the Elite Division and was relegated.
Italy	Placed 16th in the Elite Division and was relegated.
Kazakhstan	Placed 3rd in Division I A last year.
Poland	Placed 4th in Division I A last year.
Hungary	Host, placed 5th in Division I A last year.
Great Britain	Placed 1st in Division I B last year and was promoted.

=== Match officials ===
7 referees and 7 linesmen were selected for the tournament.

Referees

- (Switzerland) Alex Dipietro
- (Finland) Lasse Heikkinen
- (Czech Republic) Oldřich Hejduk
- (Canada) Jeff Ingram
- (Germany) Marc Iwert
- (Croatia) Trpimir Piragić
- (Austria) Ladislav Smetana

Linesmen

- (France) Thomas Caillot
- (Canada) Michael Harrington
- (Sweden) Ludvig Lundgren
- (Hungary) Márton Németh
- (Switzerland) Marc-Henri Progin
- (Hungary) Daniel Soós
- (Czech Republic) Josef Špůr

=== Standings ===
Pos	Team	Pld	W	OTW	OTL	L	GF	GA	GD	Pts	Qualification or relegation
1	Great Britain (P)	5	3	1	0	1	16	15	+1	11	2019 IIHF World Championship
2	Italy (P)	5	3	0	0	2	15	11	+4	9 (Note: Italy 3–0 Kazakhstan)	2019 IIHF World Championship
3	Kazakhstan	5	3	0	0	2	18	10	+8	9	
4	Hungary (H)	5	2	0	1	2	9	14	−5	7	
5	Slovenia	5	2	0	0	3	15	15	0	6	
6	Poland (R)	5	1	0	0	4	11	19	−8	3	Relegation to 2019 Division I B

Source: IIHF
Rules for classification: 1) points; 2) head-to-head points; 3) head-to-head goal difference; 4) head-to-head number of goals scored; 5) result against closest best-ranked team outside tied teams; 6) result against second-best ranked team outside tied teams; 7) seeding before tournament.
(H) Host; (P) Promoted; (R) Relegated

=== Results ===
All times are local (UTC+2).

22 April 2018; 12:30	Great Britain	3–1 (1–1, 1–0, 1–0)	Slovenia	László Papp Budapest Sports Arena, Budapest; Attendance: 1,545

Game reference

Ben Bowns
Goalies
Gašper Krošelj
Referees:
(Germany) Marc Iwert
(Croatia) Trpimir Piragić
Linesmen:
(France) Thomas Caillot
(Hungary) Daniel Soós

O'Connor (Perlini, Shields) (PP) – 06:04	1–0
	1–1	12:22 – Gregorc (Urbas, Verlič)
Dowd (Ehrhardt) – 35:59	2–1
Perlini (Hammond, O'Connor) (PP) – 44:50	3–1

6 min
Penalties
8 min
15
Shots
35

22 April 2018; 16:00	Hungary	0–3 (0–0, 0–0, 0–3)	Kazakhstan	László Papp Budapest Sports Arena, Budapest; Attendance: 7,170

Game reference

Ádám Vay
Goalies
Henrik Karlsson
Referees:
(Finland) Lasse Heikkinen
(Czech Republic) Oldřich Hejduk
Linesmen:
(Canada) Michael Harrington
(Switzerland) Marc-Henri Progin

0–1	43:38 – Orekhov (Grents)
0–2	44:35 – Rymarev (Starchenko)
0–3	47:42 – Rymarev (Semyonov) (PP)

14 min
Penalties
8 min
28
Shots
27

22 April 2018; 19:30	Poland	1–3 (1–0, 0–2, 0–1)	Italy	László Papp Budapest Sports Arena, Budapest; Attendance: 1,100

Game reference

John Murray
Goalies
Marco De Filippo
Referees:
(Canada) Jeff Ingram
(Austria) Ladislav Smetana
Linesmen:
(Sweden) Ludvig Lundgren
(Czech Republic) Josef Špůr

Zapała – 05:27	1–0
	1–1	33:21 – Scandella (Andergassen, Hochkofler)
	1–2	38:34 – Helfer (Andergassen, Hofer) (PP)
	1–3	59:43 – Deluca (Andergassen, Felicetti) (ENG)

8 min
Penalties
4 min
21
Shots
32

23 April 2018; 16:00	Slovenia	2–4 (0–1, 1–2, 1–1)	Poland	László Papp Budapest Sports Arena, Budapest; Attendance: 930

Game reference

Gašper Krošelj
Goalies
Przemysław Odrobny
Referees:
(Finland) Lasse Heikkinen
(Austria) Ladislav Smetana
Linesmen:
(Hungary) Márton Németh
(Czech Republic) Josef Špůr

	0–1	02:49 – Kapica (Dziubiński, Chmielewski) (PP)
Drozg (Vidmar) – 24:30	1–1
	1–2	27:29 – Neupauer (Pociecha, Witecki)
	1–3	36:09 – Kolusz (PS)
	1–4	51:25 – Chmielewski (Rompkowski, Dziubiński)
Urbas (Verlič) (EA) – 58:33	2–4

10 min
Penalties
12 min
38
Shots
27

23 April 2018; 19:30	Italy	2–3 (1–0, 1–2, 0–1)	Hungary	László Papp Budapest Sports Arena, Budapest; Attendance: 7,150

Game reference

Andreas Bernard
Goalies
Ádám Vay
Referees:
(Switzerland) Alex Dipietro
(Germany) Marc Iwert
Linesmen:
(France) Thomas Caillot
(Switzerland) Marc-Henri Progin

Traversa (S. Kostner, Zanatta) – 04:52	1–0
	1–1	21:17 – Sarauer (Sofron, Galló)
Larkin (Kostner, Deluca) (SH) – 31:37	2–1
	2–2	32:32 – Vas (Sebők, Galló) (PP)
	2–3	41:06 – Sebők (Wehrs)

6 min
Penalties
6 min
39
Shots
22

24 April 2018; 16:00	Kazakhstan	6–1 (1–1, 2–0, 3–0)	Great Britain	László Papp Budapest Sports Arena, Budapest; Attendance: 1,345

Game reference

Henrik Karlsson
Goalies
Ben Bowns
Jackson Whistle
Referees:
(Czech Republic) Oldřich Hejduk
(Croatia) Trpimir Piragić
Linesmen:
(Canada) Michael Harrington
(Sweden) Ludvig Lundgren

	0–1	02:33 – Ferrara (Brooks)
Grents (Yevdokimov, Mikhailis) (PP) – 14:28	1–1
Sagadeyev (Lakiza) – 32:22	2–1
Starchenko (Kuchin) – 34:20	3–1
Starchenko (Rymarev) – 41:58	4–1
Mikhailis (Lakiza) – 45:55	5–1
Asetov – 46:44	6–1

8 min
Penalties
14 min
42
Shots
25

25 April 2018; 12:30	Italy	3–0 (2–0, 1–0, 0–0)	Kazakhstan	László Papp Budapest Sports Arena, Budapest; Attendance: 1,325

Game reference

Andreas Bernard
Goalies
Henrik Karlsson
Referees:
(Finland) Lasse Heikkinen
(Germany) Marc Iwert
Linesmen:
(Sweden) Ludvig Lundgren
(Hungary) Daniel Soós

Hochkofler (Goi, McMonagle) – 05:18	1–0
D. Kostner (Insam, Gander) – 09:37	2–0
McMonagle (Deluca, Lambacher) – 25:26	3–0

12 min
Penalties
10 min
40
Shots
29

25 April 2018; 16:00	Great Britain	5–3 (2–1, 0–2, 3–0)	Poland	László Papp Budapest Sports Arena, Budapest; Attendance: 1,435

Game reference

Ben Bowns
Goalies
John Murray
Referees:
(Switzerland) Alex Dipietro
(Czech Republic) Oldřich Hejduk
Linesmen:
(Hungary) Márton Németh
(Switzerland) Marc-Henri Progin

Perlini (Richardson, Farmer) – 03:02	1–0
	1–1	12:21 – Dronia (Chmielewski, Kapica) (PP)
Shields (Farmer, Perlini) (PP) – 18:37	2–1
	2–2	23:31 – Kapica (Pociecha, Chmielewski)
	2–3	29:42 – Zapała (Malasiński, Murray)
Brooks (Dowd, Lee) – 44:56	3–3
O'Connor (Hammond, Shields) (PP2) – 46:40	4–3
J. Phillips (Lachowicz) (ENG) – 59:29	5–3

8 min
Penalties
10 min
34
Shots
39

25 April 2018; 19:30	Slovenia	4–1 (1–0, 1–1, 2–0)	Hungary	László Papp Budapest Sports Arena, Budapest; Attendance: 7,460

Game reference

Gašper Krošelj
Goalies
Ádám Vay
Referees:
(Canada) Jeff Ingram
(Austria) Ladislav Smetana
Linesmen:
(Canada) Michael Harrington
(Czech Republic) Josef Špůr

Magovac (Mušič, Ograjenšek) – 06:57	1–0
	1–1	25:07 – Sebők (Hári, Wehrs) (PP)
Urbas (Goličič, Verlič) – 29:35	2–1
Goličič (Kuralt) – 55:06	3–1
Kovačević (Kuralt) (ENG) – 56:52	4–1

14 min
Penalties
12 min
47
Shots
33

26 April 2018; 19:00	Poland	2–3 (0–2, 2–0, 0–1)	Hungary	László Papp Budapest Sports Arena, Budapest; Attendance: 7,370

Game reference

Przemysław Odrobny
Goalies
Ádám Vay
Referees:
(Canada) Jeff Ingram
(Croatia) Trpimir Piragić
Linesmen:
(France) Thomas Caillot
(Sweden) Ludvig Lundgren

	0–1	01:04 – Sebők (Galló, Hári) (PP)
	0–2	09:17 – Benk (Magosi)
Komorski (Dronia) – 25:21	1–2
Chmielewski (Kolusz, Pociecha) – 32:13	2–2
	2–3	40:30 – Hári (Sebők)

8 min
Penalties
8 min
34
Shots
36

27 April 2018; 16:00	Kazakhstan	3–5 (2–2, 1–2, 0–1)	Slovenia	László Papp Budapest Sports Arena, Budapest; Attendance: 1,645

Game reference

Henrik Karlsson
Goalies
Gašper Krošelj
Referees:
(Switzerland) Alex Dipietro
(Canada) Jeff Ingram
Linesmen:
(Hungary) Márton Németh
(Hungary) Daniel Soós

	0–1	05:17 – Verlič (Urbas, Goličič)
Petukhov (Asetov) – 06:37	1–1
Grents (Metalnikov, Yevdokimov) – 10:48	2–1
	2–2	15:47 – Urbas (Verlič, Goličič)
	2–3	27:28 – Verlič (Magovac, Sabolič) (PP)
	2–4	37:50 – Kovačević (Ograjenšek, Podlipnik) (PP)
Asetov (Petukhov, Polokhov) – 38:04	3–4
	3–5	53:56 – Verlič

8 min
Penalties
18 min
23
Shots
36

27 April 2018; 19:30	Italy	3–4 (2–2, 0–1, 1–1)	Great Britain	László Papp Budapest Sports Arena, Budapest; Attendance: 1,750

Game reference

Andreas Bernard
Marco De Filippo
Goalies
Ben Bowns
Referees:
(Finland) Lasse Heikkinen
(Austria) Ladislav Smetana
Linesmen:
(France) Thomas Caillot
(Switzerland) Marc-Henri Progin

	0–1	07:01 – Perlini (Lee, Swindlehurst)
Lambacher (Deluca, Helfer) – 07:23	1–1
	1–2	08:07 – Dowd (Brooks, O'Connor)
Larkin (Hofer, Goi) – 13:30	2–2
	2–3	22:10 – O'Connor (Richardson)
Scandella (Hochkofler, Pavlu) – 45:08	3–3
	3–4	48:44 – Perlini

4 min
Penalties
8 min
33
Shots
17

28 April 2018; 12:30	Kazakhstan	6–1 (2–0, 2–1, 2–0)	Poland	László Papp Budapest Sports Arena, Budapest; Attendance: 1,505

Game reference

Henrik Karlsson
Goalies
Przemysław Odrobny
John Murray
Referees:
(Switzerland) Alex Dipietro
(Germany) Marc Iwert
Linesmen:
(Canada) Michael Harrington
(Hungary) Daniel Soós

Starchenko (Rymarev) – 12:20	1–0
Akolzin (Orekhov) – 13:34	2–0
Starchenko (Semyonov, Dallman) (PP) – 24:34	3–0
	3–1	27:19 – Zapała (Łyszczarczyk)
Starchenko (Dallman, Semyonov) (PP) – 39:13	4–1
Kuchin (Starchenko, Rymarev) – 46:03	5–1
Starchenko (Rymarev, Semyonov) (PP2) – 59:08	6–1

4 min
Penalties
33 min
31
Shots
30

28 April 2018; 16:00	Slovenia	3–4 (1–1, 2–2, 0–1)	Italy	László Papp Budapest Sports Arena, Budapest; Attendance: 2,465

Game reference

Gašper Krošelj
Goalies
Marco De Filippo
Referees:
(Czech Republic) Oldřich Hejduk
(Croatia) Trpimir Piragić
Linesmen:
(Hungary) Márton Németh
(Switzerland) Marc-Henri Progin

	0–1	01:39 – Gander (D. Kostner, McMonagle) (PP)
Podlipnik (Mušič, Kovačevič) – 17:11	1–1
Tičar (Urbas, Verlič) (PP) – 23:55	2–1
	2–2	29:26 – Sullivan (D. Kostner, Deluca) (PP)
	2–3	33:43 – Trivellato (Deluca, Lambacher)
Kovačevič (Tičar, Magovac) – 38:52	3–3
	3–4	59:58 – D. Kostner (Sullivan, Scandella) (ENG)

12 min
Penalties
10 min
34
Shots
33

28 April 2018; 19:30	Hungary	2–3 GWS (1–0, 0–0, 1–2); OT: (0–0) (SO: 0–1)	Great Britain	László Papp Budapest Sports Arena, Budapest; Attendance: 7,870

Game reference

Ádám Vay
Goalies
Ben Bowns
Referees:
(Finland) Lasse Heikkinen
(Canada) Jeff Ingram
Linesmen:
(Sweden) Ludvig Lundgren
(Czech Republic) Josef Špůr

Bodó (Nagy, Sarauer) (PP) – 03:31	1–0
Erdély (Hári) – 41:53	2–0
	2–1	50:55 – Dowd (Brooks, Richardson)
	2–2	59:45 – Farmer (EA)

Erdély (miss)
Bodó
Sarauer (miss)
Sebők (miss)
Hári (miss)
Shootout
Farmer
O'Connor
(miss) Kirk
(miss) Dowd
10 min
Penalties
8 min
33
Shots
43

=== Awards and statistics ===
==== Awards ====
- Best players selected by the directorate:
  - Best Goaltender: (Hungary) Ádám Vay
  - Best Defenseman: (United Kingdom) Ben O'Connor
  - Best Forward: (Slovenia) Jan Urbas

Source: IIHF.com

- Media All-Stars:
  - MVP: (United Kingdom) Brett Perlini
  - Goaltender: (Hungary) Ádám Vay
  - Defenceman: (United Kingdom) Ben O'Connor / (Slovenia) Sabahudin Kovačević
  - Forwards: (United Kingdom) Brett Perlini / (Kazakhstan) Roman Starchenko / (Hungary) Balázs Sebők

Source: IIHF.com

==== Scoring leaders ====
List shows the top skaters sorted by points, then goals.

Player	GP	G	A	Pts	+/−	PIM	POS
(Kazakhstan) Roman Starchenko	5	6	2	8	0	4	F
(Slovenia) Miha Verlič	5	3	4	7	+4	2	F
(United Kingdom) Ben O'Connor	5	4	2	6	+2	2	D
(United Kingdom) Brett Perlini	5	4	2	6	+2	2	F
(Slovenia) Jan Urbas	5	3	3	6	+3	0	F
(Kazakhstan) Evgeni Rymarev	5	2	4	6	+2	2	F
(Italy) Ivan Deluca	5	1	5	6	+2	2	F
(Hungary) Balázs Sebők	5	3	2	5	+1	2	F
(Poland) Aron Chmielewski	5	2	3	5	0	2	F
(United Kingdom) Robert Dowd	5	3	1	4	−1	0	F

GP = Games played; G = Goals; A = Assists; Pts = Points; +/− = Plus/minus; PIM = Penalties in minutes; POS = Position
Source: IIHF.com

==== Leading goaltenders ====
Only the top five goaltenders, based on save percentage, who have played at least 40% of their team's minutes, are included in this list.

Player	TOI	GA	GAA	SA	Sv%	SO
(Kazakhstan) Henrik Karlsson	300:00	10	2.00	159	93.71	1
(Hungary) Ádám Vay	304:46	13	2.56	189	93.12	0
(Italy) Marco De Filippo	157:33	5	1.90	66	92.42	0
(United Kingdom) Ben Bowns	290:13	14	2.89	173	91.91	0
(Poland) Przemysław Odrobny	159:18	9	3.39	93	90.32	0

TOI = Time on Ice (minutes:seconds); SA = Shots against; GA = Goals against; GAA = Goals against average; Sv% = Save percentage; SO = Shutouts
Source: IIHF.com

== Group B tournament ==
2018 IIHF World Championship Division I B

Tournament details
- Host country: Lithuania
- Venue: 1 (in 1 host city)
- Dates: 22–28 April
- Teams: 6

Tournament statistics
- Games played: 15
- Goals scored: 86 (5.73 per game)
- Attendance: 46,040 (3,069 per game)
- Scoring leader: (Japan) Ryo Hashimoto (8 points)

Official website
- IIHF.com

=== Participants ===
Team	Qualification
Ukraine	Placed 6th in Division I A and was relegated.
Japan	Placed 2nd in Division I B last year.
Lithuania	Host, placed 3rd in Division I B last year.
Estonia	Placed 4th in Division I B last year.
Croatia	Placed 5th in Division I B last year.
Romania	Placed 1st in Division II A last year and was promoted.

=== Match officials ===
4 referees and 7 linesmen were selected for the tournament.

Referees

- (France) Damien Bliek
- (Slovenia) Miha Bulovec
- (Norway) Stian Halm
- (United Kingdom) Liam Sewell

Linesmen

- (Lithuania) Karolis Janušauskas
- (Denmark) Andreas Kroyer
- (Serbia) Ivan Nedeljković
- (Finland) Tommi Niittylä
- (Austria) Elias Seewald
- (Lithuania) Laurynas Stepankevičius
- (Slovakia) Roman Výleta

=== Standings ===
Pos	Team	Pld	W	OTW	OTL	L	GF	GA	GD	Pts	Qualification or relegation
1	Lithuania (H, P)	5	4	1	0	0	26	9	+17	14	Promoted to 2019 Division I A
2	Japan	5	2	2	0	1	17	13	+4	10 (Note: Estonia 1–2 Japan)	
3	Estonia	5	3	0	1	1	10	7	+3	10	
4	Ukraine	5	1	0	1	3	10	18	−8	4 (Note: Romania 0–3 Ukraine)	
5	Romania	5	1	0	1	3	12	18	−6	4	
6	Croatia (R)	5	1	0	0	4	11	21	−10	3	Relegation to 2019 Division II A

Source: IIHF
Rules for classification: 1) points; 2) head-to-head points; 3) head-to-head goal difference; 4) head-to-head number of goals scored; 5) result against closest best-ranked team outside tied teams; 6) result against second-best ranked team outside tied teams; 7) seeding before tournament.
(H) Host; (P) Promoted; (R) Relegated

=== Results ===
All times are local (UTC+3).

22 April 2018; 12:30	Estonia	1–2 OT (1–0, 0–1, 0–0); OT: (0–1)	Japan	Žalgiris Arena, Kaunas; Attendance: 700

Game reference

Roman Šumihhin
Goalies
Yutaka Fukufuji
Referee:
(France) Damien Bliek
Linesmen:
(Lithuania) Karolis Janušauskas
(Austria) Elias Seewald

Petrov (Arrak, Makrov) – 10:55	1–0
	1–1	38:03 – Terao (Hashimoto)
	1–2	60:53 – T. Kawai (Sato, Furuhashi)

16 min
Penalties
8 min
12
Shots
42

22 April 2018; 16:00	Romania	0–3 (0–1, 0–2, 0–0)	Ukraine	Žalgiris Arena, Kaunas; Attendance: 1,545

Game reference

Patrik Polc
Goalies
Sergei Gaiduchenko
Referee:
(United Kingdom) Liam Sewell
Linesmen:
(Denmark) Andreas Kroyer
(Lithuania) Laurynas Stepankevičius

0–1	13:52 – Katrych (Nimenko, Butsenko)
0–2	28:55 – Nimenko (Babynets)
0–3	38:49 – Butsenko (Babynets, Tolstushko)

12 min
Penalties
22 min
39
Shots
32

22 April 2018; 19:30	Croatia	0–3 (0–1, 0–2, 0–0)	Lithuania	Žalgiris Arena, Kaunas; Attendance: 6,050

Game reference

Mate Tomljenović
Goalies
Mantas Armalis
Referee:
(Norway) Stian Halm
Linesmen:
(Finland) Tommi Niittyla
(Slovakia) Roman Výleta

0–1	19:54 – Kumeliauskas (Bogdziul, Kieras) (PP)
0–2	22:23 – Krakauskas (Čypas, Gintautas)
0–3	34:59 – Cetvertak (Rybakov, Kieras)

10 min
Penalties
35 min
26
Shots
33

23 April 2018; 12:30	Ukraine	0–2 (0–2, 0–0, 0–0)	Estonia	Žalgiris Arena, Kaunas; Attendance: 160

Game reference
Sergei Gaiduchenko	Goalies	Villem-Henrik Koitmaa	Referee: (Norway) Stian Halm; Linesmen: (Serbia) Ivan Nedeljković (Finland) Tommi Niittyla
0–1 / 00:39 – Rooba (Makrov, Lahesalu); 0–2 / 09:03 – Vasjonkin (Kettunen, Gornostajev)			Referee: (Norway) Stian Halm; Linesmen: (Serbia) Ivan Nedeljković (Finland) Tommi Niittyla
8 min	Penalties	2 min	Referee: (Norway) Stian Halm; Linesmen: (Serbia) Ivan Nedeljković (Finland) Tommi Niittyla
33	Shots	33	Referee: (Norway) Stian Halm; Linesmen: (Serbia) Ivan Nedeljković (Finland) Tommi Niittyla

23 April 2018; 16:00	Japan	4–3 (1–0, 1–3, 2–0)	Croatia	Žalgiris Arena, Kaunas; Attendance: 292

Game reference

Yuta Narisawa
Goalies
Mate Tomljenović
Referee:
(Slovenia) Miha Bulovec
Linesmen:
(Lithuania) Laurynas Stepankevičius
(Slovakia) Roman Výleta

Hashimoto (Furuhashi) – 15:17	1–0
	1–1	22:03 – Rendulić (Senzel, Blagus) (PP)
	1–2	24:21 – Rendulić (Šijan)
	1–3	27:13 – Jazbec (Blagus, Šijan)
Furuhashi – 36:19	2–3
Sato (Miura, Hashimoto) – 42:50	3–3
Hashimoto (Tanaka, Furuhashi) – 52:53	4–3

10 min
Penalties
6 min
31
Shots
26

23 April 2018; 19:30	Lithuania	8–3 (3–1, 3–1, 2–1)	Romania	Žalgiris Arena, Kaunas; Attendance: 5,760

Game reference

Mantas Armalis
Goalies
Zoltán Tőke
Referee:
(France) Damien Bliek
Linesmen:
(Denmark) Andreas Kroyer
(Austria) Elias Seewald

Rybakov (Ališauskas, Kasparaitis) – 02:38	1–0
Verenis (Kumeliauskas, Bogdziul) – 03:47	2–0
Rybakov (Gintautas, Kasparaitis) – 10:55	3–0
	3–1	16:04 – G. Bíró (Gliga, Molnár)
Bogdziul (Kumeliauskas, Verenis) (PP) – 23:04	4–1
	4–2	28:03 – G. Bíró (Gliga)
Kaleinikovas (Zubrus) – 34:48	5–2
Bosas – 39:39	6–2
Bosas (Kaleinikovas, Zubrus) (PP) – 42:53	7–2
Čižas (Jasinevičius) – 46:42	8–2
	8–3	48:52 – G. Bíró (Salló, Constantin)

35 min
Penalties
6 min
29
Shots
42

25 April 2018; 12:30	Ukraine	2–4 (0–3, 0–0, 2–1)	Croatia	Žalgiris Arena, Kaunas; Attendance: 221

Game reference

Bogdan Dyachenko
Sergei Gaiduchenko
Goalies
Mate Tomljenović
Referee:
(Norway) Stian Halm
Linesmen:
(Lithuania) Karolis Janušauskas
(Denmark) Andreas Kroyer

	0–1	04:36 – Janković (Senzel, Blagus) (PP)
	0–2	11:51 – Zanoški (SH)
	0–3	13:06 – Kanaet (Tadić)
Katrych (Butsenko, Babynets) (PP) – 46:56	1–3
Nimenko (Mikhnov, Ignatenko) – 53:00	2–3
	2–4	59:58 – Vedlin (ENG)

10 min
Penalties
22 min
33
Shots
39

25 April 2018; 16:00	Romania	0–1 (0–0, 0–0, 0–1)	Estonia	Žalgiris Arena, Kaunas; Attendance: 452

Game reference
Patrik Polc	Goalies	Villem-Henrik Koitmaa	Referee: (Slovenia) Miha Bulovec; Linesmen: (Austria) Elias Seewald (Slovakia) Roman Výleta
0–1 / 59:07 – Embrich (Makrov, Lahesalu)			Referee: (Slovenia) Miha Bulovec; Linesmen: (Austria) Elias Seewald (Slovakia) Roman Výleta
6 min	Penalties	8 min	Referee: (Slovenia) Miha Bulovec; Linesmen: (Austria) Elias Seewald (Slovakia) Roman Výleta
29	Shots	25	Referee: (Slovenia) Miha Bulovec; Linesmen: (Austria) Elias Seewald (Slovakia) Roman Výleta

25 April 2018; 19:30	Japan	1–6 (0–2, 0–2, 1–2)	Lithuania	Žalgiris Arena, Kaunas; Attendance: 7,010

Game reference

Yutaka Fukufuji
Goalies
Mantas Armalis
Referee:
(United Kingdom) Liam Sewell
Linesmen:
(Serbia) Ivan Nedeljković
(Finland) Tommi Niittylä

	0–1	02:30 – Rybakov (Cetvertak, Laukaitis)
	0–2	03:03 – Bosas (Kaleinikovas)
	0–3	26:04 – Bosas (Zubrus, Aliukonis) (PP)
	0–4	27:56 – Verenis (Kumeliauskas, Čypas)
Hashimoto (Miura) – 40:41	1–4
	1–5	44:48 – Bogdziul (Kumeliauskas, Verenis)
	1–6	55:42 – Bosas (Kaleinikovas, Kieras)

14 min
Penalties
12 min
25
Shots
25

27 April 2018; 12:30	Japan	3–2 OT (1–1, 0–1, 1–0); OT: (1–0)	Romania	Žalgiris Arena, Kaunas; Attendance: 290

Game reference

Yutaka Fukufuji
Goalies
Patrik Polc
Referee:
(France) Damien Bliek
Linesmen:
(Denmark) Andreas Kroyer
(Lithuania) Laurynas Stepankevičius

Takagi (Miura, Sato) (PP) – 02:48	1–0
	1–1	08:09 – Fodor (O. Bíró, Bors) (PP)
	1–2	21:01 – Részegh (Tranca, Salló)
Echigo (Nakajima, Furuhashi) – 52:53	2–2
Nakajima (Sato, Furuhashi) – 62:29	3–2

14 min
Penalties
8 min
50
Shots
29

27 April 2018; 16:00	Estonia	5–1 (2–0, 1–1, 2–0)	Croatia	Žalgiris Arena, Kaunas; Attendance: 1,200

Game reference

Villem-Henrik Koitmaa
Goalies
Mate Tomljenović
Referee:
(United Kingdom) Liam Sewell
Linesmen:
(Lithuania) Karolis Janušauskas
(Serbia) Ivan Nedeljković

Rooba (Petrov, Makrov) – 04:01	1–0
Andrejev (Embrich) (SH) – 19:49	2–0
	2–1	25:17 – Rendulić (Blagus) –
Embrich (Gornostajev, Vasjonkin) – 28:23	3–1
Arrak (Sibirtsev, Ossipov) – 53:49	4–1
Embrich (Parras) (SH) – 56:15	5–1

10 min
Penalties
6 min
32
Shots
34

27 April 2018; 19:30	Lithuania	5–4 OT (1–1, 1–1, 2–2); OT: (1–0)	Ukraine	Žalgiris Arena, Kaunas; Attendance: 7,850

Game reference

Mantas Armalis
Goalies
Bogdan Dyachenko
Referee:
(Slovenia) Miha Bulovec
Linesmen:
(Austria) Elias Seewald
(Slovakia) Roman Výleta

Bogdziul (Kaleinikovas, Zubrus) – 08:14	1–0
	1–1	11:54 – Zakharov (Mikhnov) (SH)
	1–2	21:01 – Butsenko (Babynets, Zhovnir) (PP)
Gintautas (Katulis) (PP) – 28:48	2–2
Gintautas (Katulis, Kieras) – 45:39	3–2
Čižas (Ališauskas, Gintautas) (PP) – 49:00	4–2
	4–3	55:20 – Petrukhno (Mikhnov)
	4–4	59:23 – Nimenko (Tolstushko, Mikhnov) (EA)
Bosas (Kaleinikovas, Zubrus) – 61:04	5–4

8 min
Penalties
6 min
42
Shots
20

28 April 2018; 12:30	Croatia	3–7 (0–2, 1–2, 2–3)	Romania	Žalgiris Arena, Kaunas; Attendance: 920

Game reference

Mate Tomljenović
Vito Nikolić
Goalies
Patrik Polc
Referee:
(France) Damien Bliek
Linesmen:
(Finland) Tommi Niittylä
(Austria) Elias Seewald

	0–1	05:25 – Molnár (Tranca, Fodor)
	0–2	11:31 – Tranca (Fodor, Bors)
	0–3	27:39 – Fodor (Részegh, Bors)
	0–4	33:07 – Gliga (Molnár, Tranca)
Vedlin (Šakić, Miličić) – 37:21	1–4
	1–5	42:21 – G. Bíró (Gecse, Salló) (PP)
	1–6	43:36 – Z. Péter (B. Péter, Constantin)
Brine (Šakić, Jarčov) – 51:29	2–6
	2–7	52:41 – Részegh (Tranca, Fodor)
Brine (Janković, Zanoški) (PP2) – 55:23	3–7

6 min
Penalties
18 min
43
Shots
37

28 April 2018; 16:00	Ukraine	1–7 (0–2, 1–2, 0–3)	Japan	Žalgiris Arena, Kaunas; Attendance: 3,420

Game reference

Bogdan Dyachenko
Sergei Gaiduchenko
Goalies
Yutaka Fukufuji
Referee:
(Norway) Stian Halm
Linesmen:
(Lithuania) Karolis Janušauskas
(Lithuania) Laurynas Stepankevičius

	0–1	02:38 – Nakayashiki (Hayata, Ito)
	0–2	07:47 – Hashimoto (Terao, Ushu) (PP)
Mikhnov (Zakharov, Ignatenko) (PP) – 22:19	1–2
	1–3	27:05 – Hashimoto (Hamada, Ushu) (PP)
	1–4	35:19 – Echigo (Nakajima)
	1–5	43:22 – Ito (Miura)
	1–6	45:28 – Sato (Echigo, Nakajima)
	1–7	50:56 – Takagi (Sato)

12 min
Penalties
12 min
28
Shots
32

28 April 2018; 19:30	Lithuania	4–1 (2–1, 1–0, 1–0)	Estonia	Žalgiris Arena, Kaunas; Attendance: 10,170

Game reference

Mantas Armalis
Goalies
Villem-Henrik Koitmaa
Referee:
(United Kingdom) Liam Sewell
Linesmen:
(Serbia) Ivan Nedeljković
(Slovakia) Roman Výleta

	0–1	04:20 – Rooba (Petrov)
Ališauskas (Zubrus) – 07:38	1–1
Jasinevičius (Bogdziul) – 15:42	2–1
Verenis (Kumeliauskas) – 35:58	3–1
Verenis (Kumeliauskas) (ENG) – 57:39	4–1

10 min
Penalties
12 min
43
Shots
27

=== Awards and statistics ===
==== Awards ====
- Best players selected by the directorate:
  - Best Goaltender: (Estonia) Villem-Henrik Koitmaa
  - Best Defenseman: (Japan) Ryo Hashimoto
  - Best Forward: (Lithuania) Arnoldas Bosas

Source: IIHF.com

==== Scoring leaders ====
List shows the top skaters sorted by points, then goals.

Player	GP	G	A	Pts	+/−	PIM	POS
(Japan) Ryo Hashimoto	5	5	3	8	+4	0	D
(Lithuania) Arnoldas Bosas	5	6	0	6	+2	4	F
(Lithuania) Povilas Verenis	5	4	2	6	+4	4	F
(Lithuania) Daniel Bogdziul	5	3	3	6	+5	2	F
(Japan) Hiroto Sato	5	2	4	6	+4	0	D
(Japan) Makuru Furuhashi	5	1	5	6	+8	0	F
(Lithuania) Mark Kaleinikovas	5	1	5	6	+3	4	F
(Lithuania) Tadas Kumeliauskas	5	1	5	6	+3	6	F
(Lithuania) Dainius Zubrus	5	0	6	6	+4	2	F
(Romania) Csanád Fodor	5	2	3	5	+1	6	F
(Lithuania) Paulius Gintautas	5	2	3	5	+2	29	F

GP = Games played; G = Goals; A = Assists; Pts = Points; +/− = Plus/minus; PIM = Penalties in minutes; POS = Position
Source: IIHF.com

==== Leading goaltenders ====
Only the top five goaltenders, based on save percentage, who have played at least 40% of their team's minutes, are included in this list.

Player	TOI	GA	GAA	SA	Sv%	SO
(Estonia) Villem-Henrik Koitmaa	239:40	4	1.00	138	97.10	2
(Lithuania) Mantas Armalis	301:04	9	1.79	140	93.57	1
(Ukraine) Sergei Gaiduchenko	147:38	6	2.44	90	93.33	1
(Romania) Patrik Polc	242:24	10	2.48	150	93.33	0
(Japan) Yuta Narisawa	122:29	5	2.45	55	90.91	0

TOI = Time on Ice (minutes:seconds); SA = Shots against; GA = Goals against; GAA = Goals against average; Sv% = Save percentage; SO = Shutouts
Source: IIHF.com
