= 2017 World Junior Ice Hockey Championships – Division I =

International ice hockey tournament

2017 IIHF U20 World Championship Division I

Tournament details
- Host countries: Germany; Hungary
- Venues: 2 (in 2 host cities)
- Dates: 11–17 December 2016
- Teams: 12

The 2017 World Junior Ice Hockey Championship Division I was a pair of international under-20 ice hockey tournaments organized by the International Ice Hockey Federation. In each of the two groups, six teams played a round-robin tournament; the first-placed team was promoted to a higher level, while the last-placed team was relegated to a lower level. Divisions I A and I B represent the second and third tier of the World Junior Ice Hockey Championships. To be eligible as a "junior" a player couldn't be born earlier than 1997.

== Division I A ==
2017 IIHF U20 World Championship Division I A
Tournament details
- Host country: Germany
- City: Bremerhaven
- Venue: 1 (in 1 host city)
- Dates: 11–17 December 2016
- Teams: 6

Tournament statistics
- Games played: 15
- Goals scored: 92 (6.13 per game)
- Attendance: 22,487 (1,499 per game)
- Scoring leader: (France) Gabin Ville (12 points)

Official website
- www.iihf.com

The Division I A tournament was played in Bremerhaven, Germany, from 11 to 17 December 2016.

=== Participating teams ===
Team	Qualification
Belarus	placed 10th in Top Division last year and were relegated
Austria	placed 2nd in Division I A last year
Kazakhstan	placed 3rd in Division I A last year
Norway	placed 4th in Division I A last year
Germany	hosts; placed 5th in Division I A last year
France	placed 1st in Division I B last year and were promoted

=== Final standings ===
Pos	Team	Pld	W	OTW	OTL	L	GF	GA	GD	Pts	Promotion or relegation
1	Belarus	5	4	0	1	0	20	10	+10	13	Promoted to the 2018 Top Division
2	Germany (H)	5	3	1	0	1	17	13	+4	11	
3	France	5	2	0	0	3	16	19	−3	6 (Note: In head-to-head games, France had 6 Pts, Kazakhstan had 3 Pts, and Austria 0 Pts.)	
4	Kazakhstan	5	2	0	0	3	14	16	−2	6	
5	Austria	5	2	0	0	3	15	17	−2	6	
6	Norway	5	1	0	0	4	10	17	−7	3	Relegated to the 2018 Division I B

Source: IIHF
Rules for classification: 1) points; 2) head-to-head points; 3) head-to-head goal difference; 4) head-to-head number of goals scored; 5) result against closest best-ranked team outside tied teams; 6) result against second-best-ranked team outside tied teams; 7) seeding before tournament.
(H) Host

=== Match results ===
All times are local (Central European Time – UTC+1).

11 December 2016; 13:00	France	3–6 (1–2, 1–3, 1–1)	Belarus	Arena BHV, Bremerhaven; Attendance: 1,742

Game reference

Raphael Garnier
Quentin Papillon
Goalies
Alexander Osipkov
Referee:
(Canada) Oliver Gouin
Linesmen:
(Poland) Wojciech Moszczynski
(Sweden) Tobias Nordlander

	0–1	06:19 – Belevich (Chaika, Sharangovich)
	0–2	07:16 – M. Sushko (Sharangovich)
Ville (Melin) – 07:40	1–2
Maia (Ville) – 20:27	2–2
	2–3	22:20 – Belevich (Vasilchuk)
	2–4	35:57 – Belevich
	2–5	39:05 – Kutsyr (Belevich, Vasilchuk)
	2–6	52:40 – Martynyuk (Astankov, Vasilchuk) (PP)
Ville (Maia, Thiry) (PP) – 59:12	3–6

18 min
Penalties
30 min
15
Shots
41

11 December 2016; 16:30	Germany	5–3 (2–0, 2–2, 1–1)	Kazakhstan	Arena BHV, Bremerhaven; Attendance: 1,829

Game reference

Cody Brenner
Goalies
Nikita Boyarkin
Referee:
(Denmark) Rasmus Toppel
Linesmen:
(Italy) Nicola Basso
(Switzerland) Marc-Henri Progin

Napravnik (Mayenschein) (PP) – 01:50	1–0
Napravnik (Jahnke) – 18:05	2–0
	2–1	21:46 – Gabdullin (PP)
	2–2	26:13 – Demyanov (PS)
Kopp (PP) – 32:24	3–2
Mannes (Mayenschein, Eder) – 37:52	4–2
	4–3	52:18 – Panyukov (Polokhov, Saburov) (PP)
Mayenschein (ENG) – 59:11	5–3

16 min
Penalties
14 min
36
Shots
18

11 December 2016; 20:00	Norway	3–6 (1–2, 1–2, 1–2)	Austria	Arena BHV, Bremerhaven; Attendance: 1,838

Game reference

Jens Kristian Lillegrend
Goalies
Jakob Holzer
Referee:
(Poland) Przemyslav Kepa
Linesmen:
(Germany) Thorsten Lajoie
(Germany) Jan-Christian Muller

Christensen (Gronstad) (PP) – 02:40	1–0
	1–1	04:29 – Maxa (Kernberger)
	1–2	19:23 – Wappis (Wolf, Maxa)
S. Johansen (Karlsen) (PP) – 32:05	2–2
	2–3	35:09 – Haudum
	2–4	39:28 – Wachter (Wappis, Matzka)
	2–5	46:51 – Kromp (Poschmann) (PP)
Kjellesvik (Kaasastul) – 47:49	3–5
	3–6	56:23 – Kragl (Kromp, Poschmann) (PP2)

14 min
Penalties
12 min
15
Shots
30

12 December 2016; 13:00	Kazakhstan	1–3 (0–0, 1–1, 0–2)	France	Arena BHV, Bremerhaven; Attendance: 1,609

Game reference

Nikita Boyarkin
Goalies
Raphael Garnier
Referee:
(Czech Republic) Daniel Prazak
Linesmen:
(Germany) Thorsten Lajoie
(Poland) Wojciech Moszczynski

Bykov (Solodovnikov) – 23:11	1–0
	1–1	33:54 – Maia (Texier, Ville)
	1–2	59:15 – Pascal (Texier)
	1–3	59:35 – Ville (Texier, Maia)

6 min
Penalties
8 min
31
Shots
28

12 December 2016; 16:30	Belarus	4–2 (1–1, 0–1, 3–0)	Norway	Arena BHV, Bremerhaven; Attendance: 1,637

Game reference

Alexander Osipkov
Goalies
Jens Kristian Lillegrend
Referee:
(Denmark) Rasmus Toppel
Linesmen:
(Germany) Jan-Christian Muller
(Netherlands) Stef Oosterling

	0–1	13:36 – S. Johansen (Gronstad)
Vasilchuk (Martynyuk) (PP) – 15:48	1–1
	1–2	21:55 – Karlsen (S. Johansen, Christensen) (PP)
Belevich (Martynyuk, Vorobei) (PP) – 45:10	2–2
Yeryomenko (Buinitski, Zaichyk) (PP) – 47:21	3–2
Vasilchuk (Astankov) (ENG) – 59:54	4–2

14 min
Penalties
16 min
37
Shots
18

12 December 2016; 20:00	Austria	3–0 (1–0, 2–0, 0–0)	Germany	Arena BHV, Bremerhaven; Attendance: 1,714

Game reference

Dominic Divis
Goalies
Cody Brenner
Mirko Pantkowski
Referee:
(Canada) Oliver Gouin
Linesmen:
(Sweden) Tobias Nordlander
(Switzerland) Marc-Henri Progin

Birnbaum (Haudum, Poschmann) – 09:11	1–0
Wachter (Wolf, Wappis) – 27:09	2–0
Haudum (Poschmann, Kromp) (PP) – 28:37	3–0

10 min
Penalties
18 min
19
Shots
23

14 December 2016; 13:00	Austria	3–6 (2–2, 1–1, 0–3)	Kazakhstan	Arena BHV, Bremerhaven; Attendance: 1,590

Game reference

Dominic Divis
Goalies
Nikita Boyarkin
Referee:
(Poland) Przemyslav Kepa
Linesmen:
(Italy) Nicola Basso
(Sweden) Tobias Norlander

Kernberger (Wappis, Wolf) – 04:59	1–0
Poschmann (Kromp, Haudum) – 14:42	2–0
	2–1	15:57 – Parkhomenko (Orekhov, Panyukov)
	2–2	17:34 – Melikhov (Demyanov, Panyukov)
	2–3	26:19 – Khrestyanoski (Gabdullin)
Kromp (Haudum, Birnbaum) (PP) – 32:39	3–3
	3–4	50:49 – Panyukov (Say. Daniyar) (PP)
	3–5	53:26 – Borisevich (Panyukov, Polokhov) (PP)
	3–6	58:08 – Khrestyanoski (Melikhov)

18 min
Penalties
30 min
28
Shots
23

14 December 2016; 16:30	France	2–3 (1–2, 0–0, 1–1)	Norway	Arena BHV, Bremerhaven; Attendance: 1,666

Game reference

Raphael Garnier
Goalies
Jens Kristian Lillegrend
Referee:
(Canada) Oliver Gouin
Linesmen:
(Germany) Thorsten Lajoie
(Poland) Wojciech Moszczynski

Maia (Ville, Thiry) – 00:20	1–0
	1–1	01:30 – S. Johansen (Gronstad, Marthinsen)
	1–2	19:58 – Ellingsen (Dahl, Noer)
	1–3	52:51 – Marthinsen (Christensen, S. Johansen)
Gallet (Maia, Texier) (PP) – 59:48	2–3

10 min
Penalties
6 min
32
Shots
26

14 December 2016; 20:00	Belarus	3–4 GWS (2–2, 0–0, 1–1) (OT: 0–0) (SO: 0–2)	Germany	Arena BHV, Bremerhaven; Attendance: 1,792

Game reference

Alexander Osipkov
Goalies
Mirko Pantkowski
Referee:
(Czech Republic) Daniel Prazak
Linesmen:
(Netherlands) Stef Oosterling
(Switzerland) Marc-Henri Progin

Belevich (Yeryomenko, Vasilchuk) – 05:08	1–0
	1–1	13:13 – Mayenschein (Eder, Dumont)
	1–2	16:11 – Dumont (Eder, Mayenschein)
I. Sushko (Yeryomenko) (PP2) – 18:57	2–2
Vasilchuk (Astankov) – 50:08	3–2
	3–3	54:02 – Eder (Napravnik, Kopp (PP)

Buinitski (miss)
Sushko (miss)
Shootout
(miss) Napravnik
Mayenschein
Kopp
8 min
Penalties
22 min
26
Shots
26

15 December 2016; 13:00	Austria	3–4 (0–1, 0–2, 3–1)	France	Arena BHV, Bremerhaven; Attendance: 471

Game reference

Jakob Holzer
Goalies
Quentin Papillon
Referee:
(Czech Republic) Daniel Prazak
Linesmen:
(Germany) Thorston Lajoie
(Netherlands) Stef Oosterling

	0–1	13:53 – Texier (Guebey, Ville) (PP)
	0–2	29:14 – Guebey (Maia, Ville)
	0–3	39:38 – Ville (Texier, Maia)
Wappis (Wachter) – 43:53	1–3
Winkler (Feldner) – 45:23	2–3
Nissner – 48:12	3–3
	3–4	54:29 – Maia (Gallet, Ville) (PP)

42 min
Penalties
16 min
33
Shots
17

15 December 2016; 16:30	Kazakhstan	1–3 (0–2, 0–1, 1–0)	Belarus	Arena BHV, Bremerhaven; Attendance: 518

Game reference

Nikita Boyarkin
Goalies
Alexander Osipkov
Referee:
(Denmark) Rasmus Toppel
Linesmen:
(Italy) Nicola Basso
(Germany) Jens-Christian Muller

	0–1	04:51 – Buinitski (Savinau, Vorobei)
	0–2	12:03 – Farafontov (Martynov, Martynyuk)
	0–3	36:25 – Pishuk (Martynov, Buinitski) (PP)
Khrestyanoski (PP) – 54:38	1–3

30 min
Penalties
14 min
17
Shots
35

15 December 2016; 20:00	Norway	0–2 (0–0, 0–0, 0–2)	Germany	Arena BHV, Bremerhaven; Attendance: 609

Game reference
Jens Kristian Lillegrend	Goalies	Mirko Pantkowski	Referee: (Poland) Przemyslav Kepa; Linesmen: (Poland) Wojciech Moszczynski (Sweden) Tobias Norlander
0–1 / 51:42 – Korner (Glassl) (PP); 0–2 / 59:59 – Drews (ENG)			Referee: (Poland) Przemyslav Kepa; Linesmen: (Poland) Wojciech Moszczynski (Sweden) Tobias Norlander
10 min	Penalties	2 min	Referee: (Poland) Przemyslav Kepa; Linesmen: (Poland) Wojciech Moszczynski (Sweden) Tobias Norlander
14	Shots	30	Referee: (Poland) Przemyslav Kepa; Linesmen: (Poland) Wojciech Moszczynski (Sweden) Tobias Norlander

17 December 2016; 13:00	Kazakhstan	3–2 (0–0, 2–0, 1–2)	Norway	Arena BHV, Bremerhaven; Attendance: 1,766

Game reference

Nikita Boyarkin
Goalies
Jens Kristian Lillegrend
Referee:
(Czech Republic) Daniel Prazak
Linesmen:
(Poland) Wojciech Moszczynski
(Sweden) Tobias Nordlander

Say. Daniyar (Sam. Daniyar) (PP) – 23:21	1–0
Orekhov (Borisevich, Medvedev) (PP) – 27:04	2–0
Khrestyanoski (Say. Daniyar) – 41:35	3–0
	3–1	45:44 – Homdrom (Dahl, Ronnild)
	3–2	58:43 – Karlsen (Ellingsen) (EA)

12 min
Penalties
22 min
22
Shots
20

17 December 2016; 16:30	Belarus	4–0 (1–0, 2–0, 1–0)	Austria	Arena BHV, Bremerhaven; Attendance: 1,804

Game reference

Alexander Osipkov
Goalies
Dominic Divis
Jakob Holzer
Referee:
(Canada) Oliver Gouin
Linesmen:
(Italy) Nicola Basso
(Germany) Jan-Christian Muller

Belevich (Astankov, Zhukovski) – 15:41	1–0
Vorobei (Belevich, Vasilchuk) (PP) – 31:46	2–0
Vasilchuk (Astankov, Belevich) (PP) – 34:20	3–0
Astankov (Vorobei, Vasilchuk) (PP) – 49:19	4–0

6 min
Penalties
12 min
37
Shots
10

17 December 2016; 20:00	Germany	6–4 (2–0, 2–2, 2–2)	France	Arena BHV, Bremerhaven; Attendance: 1,902

Game reference

Mirko Pantowski
Goalies
Quentin Papillon
Referee:
(Poland) Przemyslav Kepa
Linesmen:
(Netherlands) Stef Oosterling
(Switzerland) Marc-Henri Progin

Korner – 04:51	1–0
Busch (Korner, Daubner) – 12:15	2–0
	2–1	24:58 – Maia (Texier, Ville) (PP)
Busch (Korner) – 26:36	3–1
	3–2	32:58 – Matima (Suire)
Drews (Korner, Eder) – 35:59	4–2
	4–3	41:24 – Gallet (Texier, Ville) (PP)
Eder (Schutz, Napravnik) (PP) – 47:35	5–3
Kalble (Spitzner) – 48:11	6–3
	6–4	51:09 – Torres (Pascal)

10 min
Penalties
6 min
32
Shots
17

=== Statistics ===
==== Top 10 scorers ====
Pos	Player	Country	GP	G	A	Pts	+/-	PIM
1	Gabin Ville	France	5	4	8	12	+1	0
2	Bastien Maia	France	5	5	5	10	+2	2
3	Ruslan Vasilchuk	Belarus	5	4	6	10	+7	2
4	Andrei Belevich	Belarus	5	6	3	9	+5	6
5	Alexandre Texier	France	5	1	7	8	+1	4
6	Jakob Mayenschein	Germany	5	3	3	6	+4	16
7	Tobias Eder	Germany	5	2	4	6	+4	8
8	Yevgeni Astankov	Belarus	5	1	5	6	+5	0
9	Sebastian Johansen	Norway	5	3	2	5	–1	4
10	Lukas Haudum	Austria	5	2	3	5	–1	12
10	Christoph Korner	Germany	5	2	3	5	+4	2
10	Christof Kromp	Austria	5	2	3	5	–2	4
10	Kirill Panyukov	Kazakhstan	5	2	3	5	–4	28
10	Christof Wappis	Austria	5	2	3	5	+5	4

source:IIHF

==== Goaltending leaders ====
(minimum 40% team's total ice time)

Pos	Player	Country	MINS	GA	Sv%	GAA	SO
1	Jens Kristian Lillegrend	Norway	296:39	15	89.93	3.03	0
2	Raphael Garnier	France	159:53	9	89.77	3.38	0
3	Nikita Boyarkin	Kazakhstan	299:23	15	89.73	3.01	0
4	Mirko Pantkowski	Germany	216:23	7	89.71	1.94	1
5	Alexander Osipkov	Belarus	305:00	10	88.37	1.97	1

source:IIHF

=== Awards ===
==== Best Players Selected by the Directorate ====
- Goaltender: (Germany) Mirko Pantkowski
- Defenceman: (Belarus) Pavel Vorobei
- Forward: (Belarus) Andrei Belevich

== Division I B ==
2017 IIHF U20 World Championship Division I B
Tournament details
- Host country: Hungary
- City: Budapest
- Venue: 1 (in 1 host city)
- Dates: 11–17 December 2016
- Teams: 6

Tournament statistics
- Games played: 15
- Goals scored: 92 (6.13 per game)
- Attendance: 5,373 (358 per game)
- Scoring leader: (Poland) Alan Lyszczarczyk (11 points)

Official website
- www.iihf.com

The Division I B tournament was played in Budapest, Hungary, from 11 to 17 December 2016.

=== Participating teams ===
Team	Qualification
Italy	placed 6th in Division I A last year and were relegated
Poland	placed 2nd in Division I B last year
Great Britain	placed 3rd in Division I B last year
Ukraine	placed 4th in Division I B last year
Slovenia	placed 5th in Division I B last year
Hungary	hosts; placed 1st in Division II A last year and were promoted

=== Final standings ===
Pos	Team	Pld	W	OTW	OTL	L	GF	GA	GD	Pts	Promotion or relegation
1	Hungary (H)	5	4	0	0	1	21	12	+9	12	Promoted to the 2018 Division I A
2	Poland	5	3	1	0	1	21	16	+5	11	
3	Slovenia	5	2	1	0	2	21	13	+8	8	
4	Italy	5	2	0	1	2	12	19	−7	7	
5	Ukraine	5	1	1	0	3	9	13	−4	5	
6	Great Britain	5	0	0	2	3	8	19	−11	2	Relegated to the 2018 Division II A

Source: IIHF
Rules for classification: 1) points; 2) head-to-head points; 3) head-to-head goal difference; 4) head-to-head number of goals scored; 5) result against closest best-ranked team outside tied teams; 6) result against second-best ranked team outside tied teams; 7) seeding before tournament.
(H) Host

=== Match results ===
All times are local (Central European Time – UTC+1).

11 December 2016; 13:00	Ukraine	2–4 (0–1, 0–1, 2–2)	Poland	Icecenter, Budapest; Attendance: 42

Game reference

Bogdan Dyachenko
Goalies
Mateusz Stuszinski
Referee:
(Slovakia) Tomas Orolin
Linesmen:
(Austria) Elias Seewald
(Hungary) David Vaczi

	0–1	19:11 – Wrobel (Krezolek)
	0–2	25:10 – Lyszczarczyk (Jeziorski, Skokan)
Kovalenko (Aleksandrov, Denyskin) (PP) – 47:51	1–2
	1–3	49:01 – Jeziorski (Lyszczarczyk) (PP)
Svishev (Denyskin, Rubin) – 51:55	2–3
	2–4	53:14 – Pas (Krezolk, Goscinski)

10 min
Penalties
12 min
27
Shots
42

11 December 2016; 16:30	Hungary	5–2 (1–0, 4–1, 0–1)	Italy	Icecenter, Budapest; Attendance: 1,382

Game reference

David Mark Kovacs
Goalies
Hannes Treibenreif
Referee:
(Norway) Per Gustav Solem
Linesmen:
(France) Yann Furet
(Latvia) Maris Locans

Sagi (R. Kiss) – 00:40	1–0
Kreisz (Szabad) – 24:12	2–0
Nagy (Z. Kiss, Vizi) – 26:44	3–0
Molnar (P. Kiss) – 29:08	4–0
	4–1	30:21 – de Lorenzo Meo (Gasser, Dal Sasso)
R. Kiss (Z. Kiss) (PP) – 34:20	5–1
	5–2	49:16 – Vinatzer (Pitschieler, Moroder)

6 min
Penalties
14 min
43
Shots
30

11 December 2016; 20:00	Slovenia	4–3 OT (0–0, 2–1, 1–2) (OT: 1–0)	Great Britain	Icecenter, Budapest; Attendance: 100

Game reference

Mark Vlahovic
Goalies
Renny Marr
Referee:
(Russia) Yuriy Oskirko
Linesmen:
(Norway) Havar Dahl
(Hungary) Norbert Muzsik

Maver (Orehek, Kuzman) – 23:19	1–0
	1–1	24:08 – Kirk
Simsic (Maver, Kuzman) – 38:05	2–1
	2–2	45:54 – Pound (Kirk) (PP2)
	2–3	47:10 – Duggan (Pound, Kirk) (PP)
Potocnik (Grahut) (PP) – 54:25	3–3
Tomazevic – 62:21	4–3

20 min
Penalties
10 min
39
Shots
20

12 December 2016; 13:00	Italy	1–2 OT (1–1, 0–0, 0–0) (OT: 0–1)	Ukraine	Icecenter, Budapest; Attendance: 48

Game reference

Peiti
Goalies
Mykyta Petlenko
Referee:
(France) Laurent Garbay
Linesmen:
(Hungary) Norbert Muzsik
(Serbia) Ivan Nedeljkovic

Pitschieler (Bernard, Moroder) (PP) – 03:47	1–0
	1–1	14:35 – Sherbakov (Mostovi, Kachan)
	1–2	60:46 – Denyskin (Grygoryev, Ordynsky) (PP)

10 min
Penalties
8 min
29
Shots
41

12 December 2016; 16:30	Great Britain	1–5 (0–3, 1–1, 0–1)	Hungary	Icecenter, Budapest; Attendance: 520

Game reference

Renny Marr
Goalies
David Mark Kovacs
Referee:
(Slovakia) Tomas Orolin
Linesmen:
(Norway) Havar Dahl
(Austria) Elias Seewald

	0–1	12:19 – Sagi (Revesz, Z. Kiss) (PP)
	0–2	12:45 – Molnar (P. Kiss, Vertes)
	0–3	13:20 – Sagi (SH)
	0–4	22:42 – P. Kiss (Fejes) (PP)
Glossop (Buesa) – 29:37	1–4
	1–5	59:43 – Z. Kiss (Nagy, Stipsicz)

12 min
Penalties
12 min
32
Shots
43

12 December 2016; 20:00	Poland	5–3 (1–0, 2–1, 2–2)	Slovenia	Icecenter, Budapest; Attendance: 38

Game reference

Mateusz Studzinski
Goalies
Tilen Spreitzer
Referee:
(Norway) Per Gustav Solem
Linesmen:
(France) Yann Furet
(Hungary) David Vaczi

Lyszczarczyk (PP) – 05:23	1–0
Krezolek (Wrobel) – 26:25	2–0
	2–1	27:51 – Potocnik (Grahut)
Wrobel (Goscinski) – 35:02	3–1
	3–2	42:31 – Jezovsek (Simsic, Petek) (PP)
Kameneu (Lyszczarczyk, Skokan) (PP2) – 44:29	4–2
	4–3	53:27 – Drozg (Zibelnik)
Jeziorski (Lyszczarcyk, Chorazyczewski) (ENG) – 59:31	5–3

12 min
Penalties
12 min
21
Shots
41

14 December 2016; 13:00	Italy	0–7 (0–2, 0–1, 0–4)	Slovenia	Icecenter, Budapest; Attendance: 36

Game reference

Simone Peiti
Goalies
Mark Vlahovic
Referee:
(Russia) Yuriy Oskirko
Linesmen:
(Norway) Havar Dahl
(Austria) Elias Seewald

0–1	08:36 – Jezovsek (Petek, Simsic)
0–2	18:49 – Simsic (Tomazevic, Jezovsek) (PP)
0–3	31:19 – Zorko (Maver, Macuh)
0–4	51:03 – Jeklic (Jezovsek, Simsic)
0–5	51:31 – Jeklic (Glavic, Simsic)
0–6	52:52 – Markic (Ban, Ulamec)
0–7	Macuh (Tomazevic, Grahut)

8 min
Penalties
16 min
27
Shots
36

14 December 2016; 16:30	Hungary	3–1 (1–1, 0–0, 2–0)	Ukraine	Icecenter, Budapest; Attendance: 349

Game reference

David Mark Kovacs
Goalies
Bogdan Dyachenko
Referee:
(Norway) Per Gustav Solem
Linesmen:
(France) Yann Furet
(Serbia) Ivan Nedeljkovic

Peter (Revesz, Stipsicz) – 02:58	1–0
	1–1	07:05 – Svishev (Aleksandrov, Vorona) (PP)
Sagi (Stipsicz) – 40:16	2–1
Revesz (Peter, R. Kiss) – 47:57	3–1

27 min
Penalties
6 min
41
Shots
26

14 December 2016; 20:00	Poland	3–2 GWS (0–1, 1–1, 1–0) (OT: 0–0) (SO: 1–0)	Great Britain	Icecenter, Budapest; Attendance: 86

Game reference

Mateusz Studzinski
Goalies
Renny Marr
Referee:
(France) Laurent Garbay
Linesmen:
(Latvia) Maris Locans
(Hungary) Norbert Muzsik

	0–1	11:30 – Billing (Pound, Speirs) (PP)
	0–2	31:12 – Kirk (Plews, Kelsall)
Lyszczarczyk (Jeziorski, Skokan) (PP) – 35:12	1–2
Goscinski (Kameneu, Krezolek) – 50:42	2–2

Wrobel
Lyszczarczyk (miss)
Krezolek (miss)
Shootout
(miss) Kirk
(miss) Duggan
(miss) Billing
4 min
Penalties
4 min
42
Shots
26

15 December 2016; 13:00	Ukraine	1–4 (1–2, 0–2, 0–0)	Slovenia	Icecenter, Budapest; Attendance: 38

Game reference

Mykyta Petlenko
Goalies
Mark Vlahovic
Referee:
(Slovakia) Tomas Orolin
Linesmen:
(Latvia) Maris Locans
(Hungary) David Vaczi

	0–1	01:38 – Ban (Zorko)
	0–2	13:45 – Jezovsek (Simsic, Tomazevic)
Mazur (Svishev) (PP) – 15:39	1–2
	1–3	29:19 – Jezovsek (Simsic, Petek)
	1–4	36:31 – Glavic (Potocnik, Petek) (SH)

25 min
Penalties
10 min
19
Shots
35

15 December 2016; 16:30	Poland	5–4 (4–0, 1–0, 0–4)	Hungary	Icecenter, Budapest; Attendance: 1,120

Game reference

Mateusz Studzinski
Goalies
Bence Kiss
David Mark Kovacs
Referee:
(Russia) Yuriy Oskirko
Linesmen:
(Norway) Havar Dahl
(Austria) Elias Seewald

Jeziorski (Filip, Skokan) (PP) – 05:42	1–0
Zielinski (Jeziorski, Lyszczarczyk) (PP) – 07:33	2–0
Jeziorski (Lyszczarczyk) (PP) – 08:19	3–0
Goscinski (Musiol) – 11:38	4–0
Sroka (Pas) – 28:18	5–0
	5–1	40:32 – Peter (Revesz Sagi) (PP)
	5–2	50:15 – Revesz (Peter)
	5–3	51:51 – Sagi (Peter, Fejes) (PP)
	5–4	59:14 – Szabad (Stipsicz, Peter) (EA)

16 min
Penalties
31 min
32
Shots
44

15 December 2016; 20:00	Great Britain	1–4 (0–3, 1–1, 0–0)	Italy	Icecenter, Budapest; Attendance: 54

Game reference

Renny Marr
Goalies
Hannes Treibenreif
Referee:
(Norway) Per Gustav Solem
Linesmen:
(France) Yann Furet
(Serbia) Ivan Nedeljkovic

	0–1	02:14 – Marzolini (Tschimben)
	0–2	06:41 – March (Pitschieler) (PP)
	0–3	17:49 – Moroder (Gasser)
Buesa – 22:46	1–3
	1–4	30:31 – Laner (Thum, Marzolini)

6 min
Penalties
6 min
33
Shots
30

17 December 2016; 13:00	Italy	5–4 (3–1, 1–1, 1–2)	Poland	Icecenter, Budapest; Attendance: 38

Game reference

Hannes Treibenreif
Goalies
Mateusz Studzinski
Referee:
(Slovakia) Tomas Orolin
Linesmen:
(Norway) Havar Dahl
(Serbia) Ivan Nedeljkovic

Gasser – 07:37	1–0
	1–1	10:18 – Jeziorski (Filip, Lyszczarczyk) (PP)
Berger (Spornberger, Cordiano) – 13:46	2–1
Deluca (March, Dal Sasso) (PP) – 15:19	3–1
	3–2	26:50 – Jeziorski (Lyszczarczyk)
Deluca – 28:35	4–2
	4–3	46:54 – Wrobel (Goscinski)
Tschimben (Gasser, Laner) – 53:37	5–3
	5–4	59:22 – Lyszczarczyk (EA)

20 min
Penalties
6 min
30
Shots
37

17 December 2016; 16:30	Slovenia	3–4 (0–1, 3–0, 0–3)	Hungary	Icecenter, Budapest; Attendance: 1,480

Game reference

Mark Vlahovic
Goalies
Bence Kiss
Referee:
(France) Laurent Garbay
Linesmen:
(Latvia) Maris Locans
(Austria) Elias Seewald

	0–1	09:02 – Peter (Revesz)
Zorko (Jeklic, Glavic) (PP) – 27:17	1–1
Maver (Orehek, Ulamec) – 33:12	2–1
Tomazevic (Drozg, Zan Jezovsek) (PP) – 39:42	3–1
	3–2	41:41 – Revesz (Peter, Sandor)
	3–3	42:27 – Stipsicz (Garat, Z. Kiss)
	3–4	44:07 – Sagi (Revesz, P. Kiss) (PP)

4 min
Penalties
10 min
33
Shots
39

17 December 2015; 20:00	Great Britain	1–3 (0–1, 0–1, 1–1)	Ukraine	Icecenter, Budapest; Attendance: 42

Game reference

Renny Marr
Goalies
Bogdan Dyachenko
Referee:
(Russia) Yuriy Oskirko
Linesmen:
(Hungary) Norbert Muzsik
(Hungary) David Vaczi

	0–1	04:06 – Ruban
	0–2	37:03 – Kovalenko (Ruban, Denyskin)
Speirs (Billing, Bonner) – 50:56	1–2
	1–3	59:19 – Svishev (ENG)

4 min
Penalties
14 min
25
Shots
32

=== Statistics ===
==== Top 10 scorers ====
Pos	Player	Country	GP	G	A	Pts	+/-	PIM
1	Alan Łyszczarczyk	Poland	5	4	7	11	0	6
2	Bartłomiej Jeziorski	Poland	5	6	4	10	+2	2
3	Andor Peter	Hungary	5	3	5	8	+5	0
3	Marcell Revesz	Hungary	5	3	5	8	+6	2
5	Nik Simsic	Slovenia	5	2	6	8	+3	12
6	Martin Sagi	Hungary	5	6	1	7	+8	2
7	Zan Jezovsek	Slovenia	5	4	3	7	+3	16
8	Blaz Tomazevic	Slovenia	5	2	4	6	+3	2
9	Kamil Wróbel	Poland	5	4	1	5	+7	2
10	Luka Maver	Slovenia	5	2	3	5	+3	4
10	Mateusz Gościński	Poland	5	2	3	5	+7	4

GP = Games played; G = Goals; A = Assists; Pts = Points; +/− = P Plus–minus; PIM = Penalties In Minutes Source: IIHF.com

==== Goaltending leaders ====
(minimum 40% team's total ice time)

Pos	Player	Country	MINS	GA	Sv%	GAA	SO
1	Bogdan Dyachenko	Ukraine	180:00	8	92.59	2.67	0
2	Mark Vlahovic	Slovenia	241:41	8	92.38	1.99	1
3	Mykyta Petlenko	Ukraine	120:46	5	92.19	2.48	0
4	David Mark Kovacs	Hungary	191:38	8	91.75	2.50	0
5	Hannes Treibenreif	Italy	180:00	10	91.15	3.33	0

Source: IIHF.com

=== Awards ===
==== Best Players Selected by the Directorate ====
- Goaltender: (Slovenia) Mark Vlahovic
- Defenceman: (Hungary) Bence Stipsicz
- Forward: (Poland) Alan Lyszczarczyk
