= Garnet Hathaway =

American ice hockey player (born 1991)

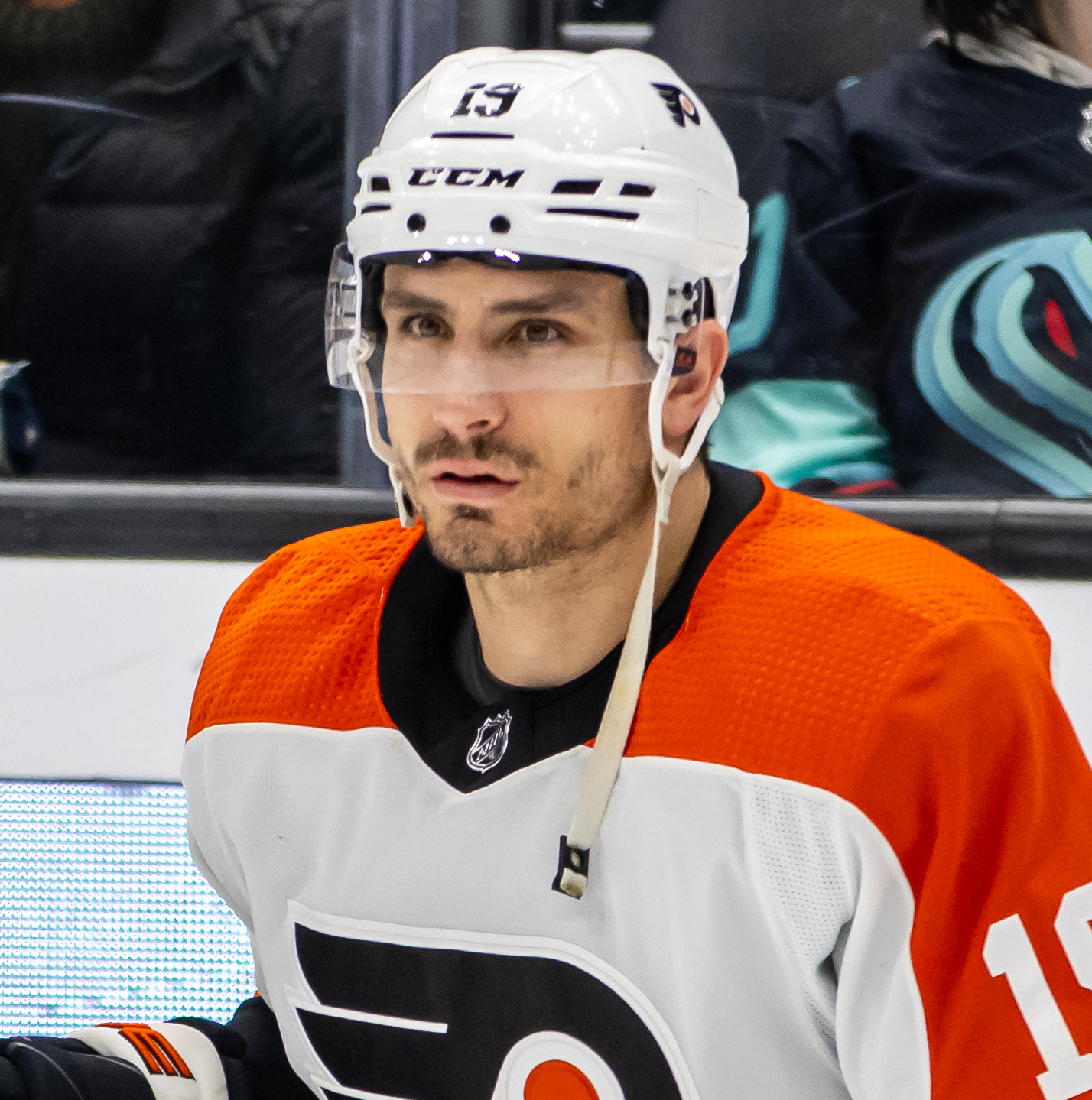
- Hathaway with the Philadelphia Flyers in 2023
- Born: November 23, 1991 (age 34) Naples, Florida, U.S.
- Height: 6 ft 2 in (188 cm)
- Weight: 210 lb (95 kg; 15 st 0 lb)
- Position: Forward
- Shoots: Right
- NHL team Former teams: Florida Panthers; Calgary Flames; Washington Capitals; Boston Bruins; Philadelphia Flyers
- NHL draft: Undrafted
- Playing career: 2014–present

John Garnet Hathaway (born November 23, 1991) is an American professional ice hockey player who is a forward for the Florida Panthers of the National Hockey League (NHL).

== Early life ==
Hathaway was born in Naples, Florida, but moved to Kennebunkport, Maine, with his family when he was six months old. He began playing hockey in Maine around the age of three with his older brother, and would practice at home when the pond by the family house froze over in the winter. In 1999, when he was seven years old, Hathaway and his family spent three months traveling around the world, a trip that his father John had planned to help "really give them the experience" of world travel.

Growing up, Hathaway and his older brother Ephraim were fans of the Washington Capitals of the National Hockey League (NHL), as their uncle, Greg Shove, had once worked with Capitals owner Ted Leonsis. Hathaway played hockey all four years at Phillips Academy Andover, a college-preparatory school in Andover, Massachusetts, where he played on a line with future New York Rangers skater Chris Kreider. Hathaway served as one of the Phillips Academy team captains during his senior season in 2010, and led the team in scoring with 37 points.

== Playing career ==
=== Amateur ===
Mike Addesa, who coached Hathaway in the Hockey Night in Boston Elite Tournament in 2009, suggested that Mark White, the assistant coach for the Brown Bears men's ice hockey team, take a look at the player. While attending Brown University, Hathaway studied business, entrepreneurship and organizations. During the summer after his sophomore year, Hathaway and his Bears teammate Mike Juola purchased and operated a lobster roll cart.

Hathaway was part of a team of freshmen, also including Dennis Robertson, Matt Wahl, Marco de Filippo Roia, Mark Hourihan, and Jake Goldberg, that was expected to play a key role with the Bears in the 2010–11 season. He scored his first collegiate point on November 5, 2010, assisting David Brownschidle in the second period of a 3–3 tie against the Quinnipiac Bobcats. Hathaway later earned his first career goal in a 7–3 loss to Minnesota State at the 2011 Shillelagh Tournament championship game on January 2, 2011. At the end of the season, Hathaway was one of 23 Bears, including eight freshmen, named to the 2011 ECAC Hockey All-Academic Team, given to student-athletes with at least a 3.00 cumulative grade point average on a 4.00 scale.

As a sophomore during the 2011–12 season, Hathaway scored his first goal of the year on October 29, 2011, in a 3–2 victory over the Princeton Tigers. He missed six games due to illness, and finished the season with only three goals and five assists. On May 8, 2012, Hathaway was named one of four assistant captains for the Bears, and on June 26, he was named to the ECAC Hockey All-Academic Team for the second year in a row.

On May 14, 2014, Hathaway was awarded the Patrick S. Jones Memorial Trophy, a coaches' award given to the "member of the team who generates the most spark and enthusiasm in building team spirit". Across his collegiate hockey career, Hathaway totaled 58 points (20 goals and 38 assists) and 178 penalty minutes in 121 games with the Bears.

=== Professional ===
==== Calgary Flames ====
Following his junior year at Brown, Hathaway was invited to attend summer development camps with the Boston Bruins and Pittsburgh Penguins. On March 14, 2014, he signed a minor league deal with the Abbotsford Heat, the American Hockey League (AHL) affiliate of the Calgary Flames. Hathaway finished out the 2013–14 AHL season with the Heat, appearing in eight regular-season games and one playoff game. In his AHL debut, Hathaway fought with Jamie Devane, then with the Toronto Marlies.

The following season he remained in the AHL, relocating with his team to play as a member of the Adirondack Flames. During the 2014–15 season, Hathaway played 72 games with Adirondack, where his 19 goals and 36 points impressed the Calgary Flames' general manager Brad Treliving. On April 13, 2015, the Calgary Flames of the National Hockey League (NHL) signed Hathaway to a two-year two-way contract.

After spending much of the 2015–16 season with the Stockton Heat, Hathaway earned his first recall and made his NHL debut for the Flames on February 29, 2016, in a 4–3 loss to the Philadelphia Flyers.

Hathaway scored his first career NHL goal on November 20, 2016, against the Detroit Red Wings.

==== Washington Capitals ====
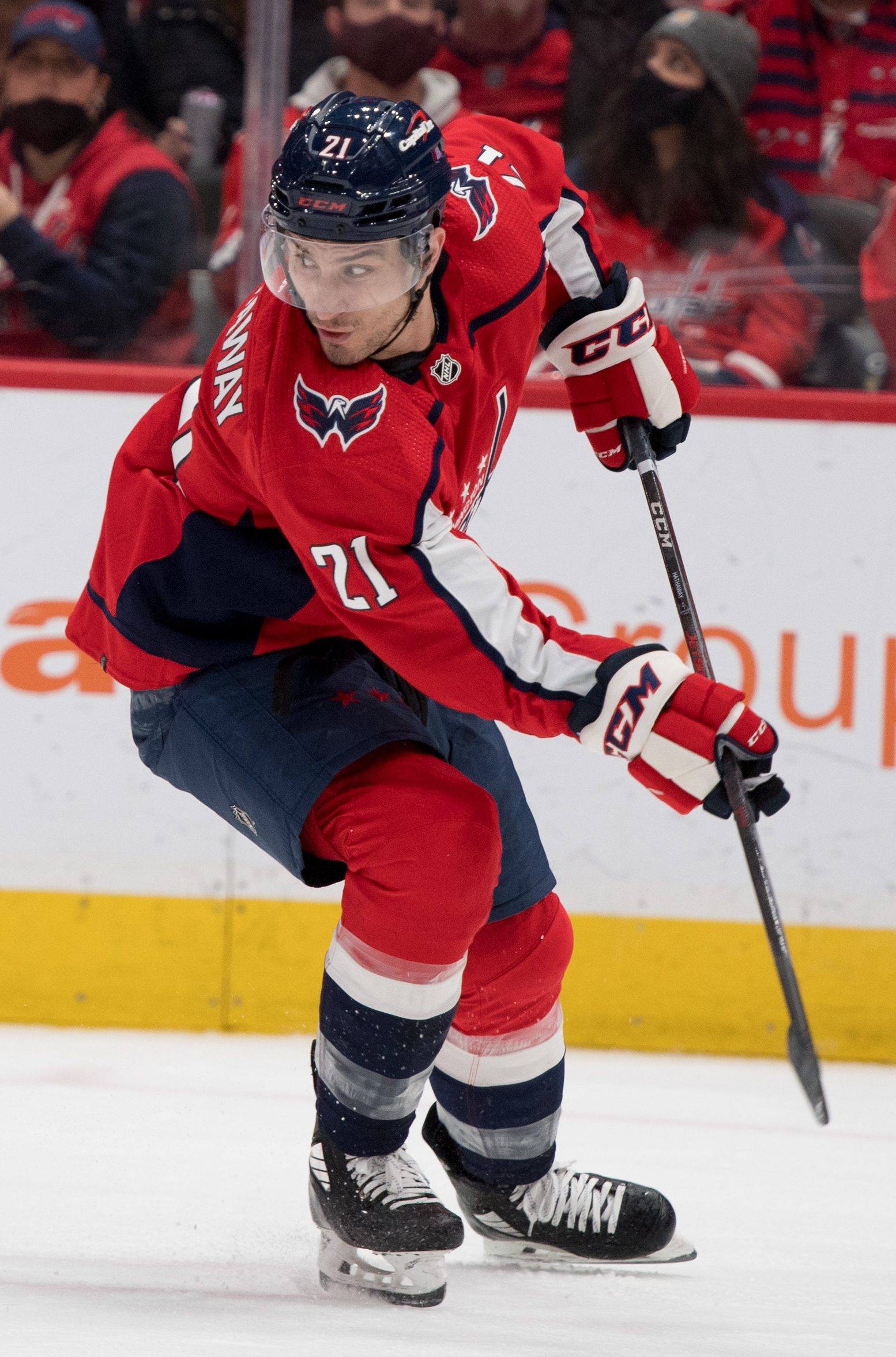
Hathaway with the Washington Capitals in 2021

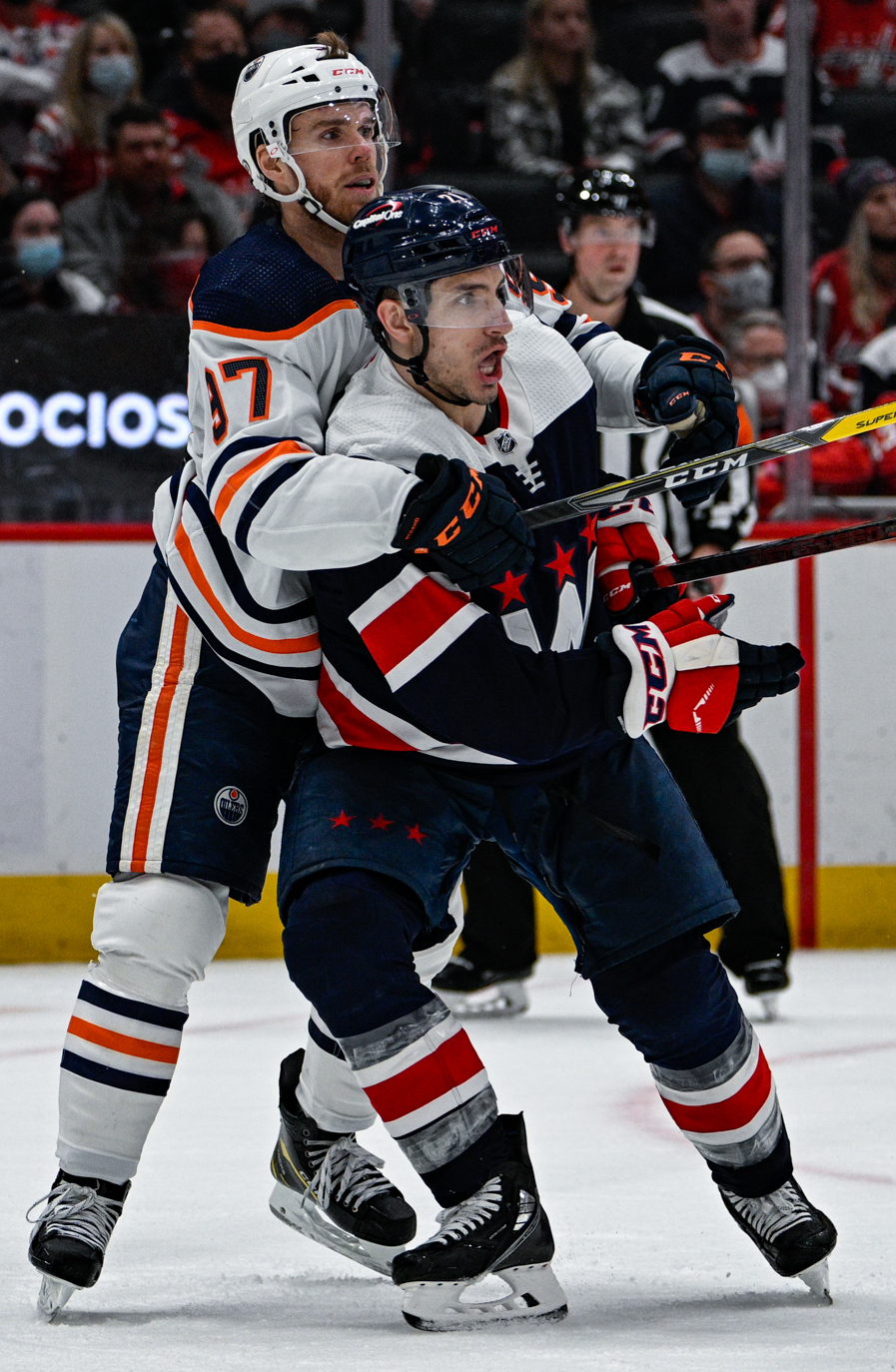
Hathaway (right) being defended by Connor McDavid in 2022

On July 1, 2019, Hathaway signed a four-year, $6 million contract with the Washington Capitals.

On November 18, 2019, Hathaway was given a match penalty and was ejected from a game against the Anaheim Ducks when he intentionally spat on skater Erik Gudbranson during a fight. Following the game ejection, the NHL suspended Hathaway for three games without pay, and announced that he would forfeit $24,193 to the Players' Emergency Assistance Fund as part of his punishment. The Ducks' reaction to the spitting incident was vitriolic, with Gudbranson saying, "It's something you just don't do in our game, and he did it". Teammate Derek Grant added, "At the end of the day, it's probably the least respectful thing you can ever do to somebody."

When the NHL returned to play, Hathaway was one of the 31 Capitals invited to Toronto for the 2020 Stanley Cup playoffs.

Hathaway played on the fourth line with Nic Dowd and Carl Hagelin throughout the 2020-21 NHL season.

==== Boston Bruins ====
On February 23, 2023, Hathaway and Dmitry Orlov were traded from the Capitals to the Boston Bruins in exchange for Craig Smith, a 2023 first-round pick, a 2025 second-round pick and a 2024 third-round pick.

==== Philadelphia Flyers ====
Leaving the Bruins at the conclusion of his contract, Hathaway was signed on the opening day of free agency to a two-year, $4.75 million contract with the Philadelphia Flyers on July 1, 2023.

One year prior to the conclusion of his initial contract with them, the Flyers signed Hathaway to a two-year extension worth $4.8 million. He will be an unrestricted free agent (UFA) after the conclusion of the 2026-27 season.

==== Florida Panthers ====
On June 25, 2026, Hathaway, along with a 2026 sixth-round pick, was traded to the Florida Panthers, in exchange for a 2026 fifth-round pick and a 2027 fourth-round pick.

== Personal life ==
In October 2019, Hathaway and his Capitals linemate Nic Dowd started a podcast called "Between Two Blue Lines". Rather than discussing hockey, Hathaway and Dowd use the podcast to talk about their families and other off-ice activities.

== Career statistics ==
			Regular season					Playoffs
Season	Team	League	GP	G	A	Pts	PIM	GP	G	A	Pts	PIM
2008–09	Phillips Andover	USHS	26	16	13	29	14	—	—	—	—	—
2009–10	Phillips Andover	USHS	28	17	20	37	32	—	—	—	—	—
2010–11	Brown University	ECAC	31	5	9	14	42	—	—	—	—	—
2011–12	Brown University	ECAC	26	3	5	8	48	—	—	—	—	—
2012–13	Brown University	ECAC	33	6	15	21	47	—	—	—	—	—
2013–14	Brown University	ECAC	31	6	9	15	41	—	—	—	—	—
2013–14	Abbotsford Heat	AHL	8	0	0	0	10	1	0	0	0	10
2014–15	Adirondack Flames	AHL	72	19	17	36	77	—	—	—	—	—
2015–16	Stockton Heat	AHL	44	8	13	21	39	—	—	—	—	—
2015–16	Calgary Flames	NHL	14	0	3	3	31	—	—	—	—	—
2016–17	Stockton Heat	AHL	31	8	12	20	67	5	2	2	4	2
2016–17	Calgary Flames	NHL	26	1	4	5	44	—	—	—	—	—
2017–18	Stockton Heat	AHL	18	11	8	19	30	—	—	—	—	—
2017–18	Calgary Flames	NHL	59	4	9	13	88	—	—	—	—	—
2018–19	Calgary Flames	NHL	76	11	8	19	56	5	0	0	0	14
2019–20	Washington Capitals	NHL	66	9	7	16	79	8	0	0	0	12
2020–21	Washington Capitals	NHL	56	6	12	18	66	5	2	1	3	4
2021–22	Washington Capitals	NHL	76	14	12	26	57	6	1	1	2	16
2022–23	Washington Capitals	NHL	59	9	7	16	52	—	—	—	—	—
2022–23	Boston Bruins	NHL	25	4	2	6	17	7	0	1	1	10
2023–24	Philadelphia Flyers	NHL	82	7	10	17	132	—	—	—	—	—
2024–25	Philadelphia Flyers	NHL	67	10	11	21	58	—	—	—	—	—
2025–26	Philadelphia Flyers	NHL	66	1	2	3	59	8	1	1	2	14
NHL totals			672	76	87	163	739	39	4	4	8	70
