= Maxim Semyonov =

Kazakhstani ice hockey player

- Born: 9 February 1984 (age 42) Ust-Kamenogorsk, Kazakh SSR, Soviet Union
- Height: 6 ft 1 in (185 cm)
- Weight: 183 lb (83 kg; 13 st 1 lb)
- Position: Defence
- Shot: Left
- KHL team Former teams: Free Agent; Lada Togliatti; Atlant Moscow Oblast; Lokomotiv Yaroslavl; Barys Nur-Sultan
- National team: Kazakhstan
- NHL draft: 220th overall, 2004; Toronto Maple Leafs
- Playing career: 2003–2020

Maxim Petrovich Semyonov (Russian: Максим Петрович Семёнов; born 9 February 1984) is a Kazakhstani professional ice hockey defenceman who is currently an unrestricted free agent. He most recently played for Barys Nur-Sultan in the KHL. He participated at the 2010 IIHF World Championship as a member of the Kazakhstan men's national ice hockey team.

== Playing career ==
Maxim Semyonov is a Kazakhstan native who got his start in big hockey as a 19-year-old skating for Lada Togliatti of the Russian Superleague during the 2003–04 season. The young player stuck in the lineup and was drafted by the Toronto Maple Leafs with the 220th overall selection of the 2004 NHL entry draft.

During the 2005–06 season, Semyonov moved to play for Khimik Moscow Oblast and remained with the team when it was adopted into the Kontinental Hockey League in 2008.

Following the 2012–13 season, in which he split between Atlant Moscow Oblast and Lokomotiv Yaroslavl, Semyonov returned to Kazakhstan signing with hometown KHL entrant Barys Astana on June 20, 2013.

== Career statistics ==
=== Regular season and playoffs ===
			Regular season					Playoffs
Season	Team	League	GP	G	A	Pts	PIM	GP	G	A	Pts	PIM
2000–01	Sibir–2 Novosibirsk	RUS.3	38	0	2	2	16	—	—	—	—	—
2001–02	Lada–2 Togliatti	RUS.3	66	6	12	18	114	—	—	—	—	—
2002–03	Lada Togliatti	RSL	24	0	0	0	16	6	0	1	1	10
2002–03	Lada–2 Togliatti	RUS.3	18	0	5	5	28	—	—	—	—	—
2003–04	Lada Togliatti	RSL	59	2	5	7	50	6	0	0	0	0
2003–04	Lada–2 Togliatti	RUS.3	4	0	1	1	29	—	—	—	—	—
2004–05	Lada Togliatti	RSL	59	2	4	6	79	9	0	0	0	6
2005–06	Lada Togliatti	RSL	23	0	2	2	24	—	—	—	—	—
2005–06	Khimik Moscow Oblast	RSL	28	2	8	10	76	9	1	0	1	8
2006–07	Khimik Moscow Oblast	RSL	52	3	7	10	58	9	0	2	2	14
2007–08	Khimik Moscow Oblast	RSL	51	4	11	15	44	5	0	0	0	0
2008–09	Atlant Moscow Oblast	KHL	54	5	13	18	40	5	1	1	2	2
2009–10	Atlant Moscow Oblast	KHL	51	3	3	6	28	4	1	1	2	4
2010–11	Atlant Moscow Oblast	KHL	49	3	7	10	30	20	0	1	1	12
2011–12	Atlant Moscow Oblast	KHL	20	3	8	11	14	12	0	3	3	28
2012–13	Atlant Moscow Oblast	KHL	22	0	4	4	12	—	—	—	—	—
2012–13	Lokomotiv Yaroslavl	KHL	3	0	0	0	2	6	0	1	1	4
2013–14	Barys Astana	KHL	44	0	10	10	59	9	0	1	1	14
2014–15	Barys Astana	KHL	49	2	3	5	54	4	0	0	0	4
2015–16	Barys Astana	KHL	59	2	4	6	40	—	—	—	—	—
2016–17	Barys Astana	KHL	60	0	10	10	60	10	0	1	1	12
2017–18	Barys Astana	KHL	55	0	11	11	24	—	—	—	—	—
2018–19	Barys Astana	KHL	48	1	2	3	16	11	0	0	0	27
2019–20	Barys Nur–Sultan	KHL	17	0	1	1	12	—	—	—	—	—
2019–20	Nomad Nur–Sultan	VHL	13	1	4	5	12	—	—	—	—	—
RSL totals			296	13	37	50	347	44	1	3	4	38
KHL totals			531	19	77	96	391	81	2	9	11	107

Medal record

Representing Kazakhstan

Ice hockey

Asian Winter Games
Gold medal – first place	2011 Astana-Almaty	Ice hockey

=== International ===
Year	Team	Event	Result	GP	G	A	Pts	PIM
2001	Kazakhstan	WJC18 D1	15th	5	0	0	0	10
2010	Kazakhstan	WC	16th	6	0	1	1	4
2011	Kazakhstan	AWG	1st place, gold medalist(s)	3	1	0	1	0
2011	Kazakhstan	WC D1	17th	4	1	0	1	2
2013	Kazakhstan	WC D1A	17th	1	0	0	0	0
2014	Kazakhstan	WC	16th	7	0	1	1	0
2015	Kazakhstan	WC D1A	17th	5	0	1	1	0
2016	Kazakhstan	WC	16th	7	1	1	2	2
2016	Kazakhstan	OGQ	DNQ	3	0	0	0	2
2017	Kazakhstan	WC D1A	19th	5	0	1	1	4
2018	Kazakhstan	WC D1A	19th	5	0	4	4	0
2019	Kazakhstan	WC D1A	17th	5	0	0	0	2
Junior totals				5	0	0	0	10
Senior totals				51	3	9	12	16
