= Kirill Polokhov =

Kazakhstani ice hockey player

- Born: 23 March 1998 (age 27) Qaraghandy, Kazakhstan
- Height: 1.91 m (6 ft 3 in)
- Weight: 89 kg (196 lb; 14 st 0 lb)
- Position: Defence
- Shoots: Left
- KAZ team Former teams: Nomad Astana; Barys Astana
- National team: Kazakhstan
- Playing career: 2014–present

Kirill Vladimirovich Polokhov (Russian: Кирилл Владимирович Полохов; born 23 March 1998) is a Kazakh professional ice hockey defenceman who currently plays for Nomad Astana of the Kazakhstan Hockey Championship (KAZ).

== Playing career ==
Polokhov began his hockey development with Yunost Karagandy and Tyumensky Legion in the Russian Junior Hockey League. At just 16 years old, he made the jump to senior-level play by joining Arystan Temirtau in the Kazakhstan Hockey Championship in 2014, where he tallied 3 assists across 34 games. The following year, he signed with Barys Astana of the Kontinental Hockey League. He was assigned to their junior affiliate, Snezhnye Barsy, competing in the Junior Hockey League (MHL). During his debut MHL season, he registered 1 goal and 1 assist in 41 games with a +9 rating. In the 2016–17 campaign, he earned a spot in the MHL All-Star Game and concluded the season with 13 points over 50 games.

In the 2017 pre-season, Yevgeni Koreshkov chose Polokhov to join Barys Astana in the Kontinental Hockey League (KHL). Polokhov netted his first goal for Barys on August 18, 2017, during the Viktor Blinov Memorial Tournament in a game against Amur Khabarovsk. He made his official KHL debut shortly after, on August 24, in a matchup against Spartak Moscow. Just over a month later, on September 25, he scored his first KHL goal in a game against SKA Saint Petersburg.

== International play ==
He competed for Kazakhstan at the 2023 Winter World University Games, where he helped the team secure a bronze medal.

== Career statistics ==
=== Regular season and playoffs ===
| | | | Regular season | | | | | Playoffs |
| Season | Team | League | GP | G | A | Pts | PIM | GP | G | A | Pts | PIM |
|---|---|---|---|---|---|---|---|---|---|---|---|---|
| 2014–15 | Arystan Temirtau | KAZ | 30 | 0 | 3 | 3 | 39 | 4 | 0 | 0 | 0 | 0 |
| 2015–16 | Snezhnye Barsy Astana | MHL | 41 | 1 | 1 | 2 | 71 | 7 | 0 | 0 | 0 | 4 |
| 2016–17 | Snezhnye Barsy Astana | MHL | 50 | 4 | 9 | 13 | 22 | — | — | — | — | — |
| 2017–18 | Barys Astana | KHL | 52 | 1 | 1 | 2 | 12 | — | — | — | — | — |
| 2017–18 | Snezhnye Barsy Astana | MHL | 7 | 0 | 2 | 2 | 0 | — | — | — | — | — |
| 2018–19 | Barys Astana | KHL | 52 | 0 | 1 | 1 | 6 | 4 | 0 | 0 | 0 | 0 |
| 2018–19 | Snezhnye Barsy Astana | MHL | 7 | 1 | 2 | 3 | 4 | — | — | — | — | — |
| 2018–19 | Nomad Astana | KAZ | 2 | 0 | 2 | 2 | 0 | — | — | — | — | — |
| 2019–20 | Nomad Nur-Sultan | KAZ | 41 | 2 | 2 | 4 | 16 | — | — | — | — | — |
| 2019–20 | Barys Nur-Sultan | KHL | 8 | 0 | 1 | 1 | 5 | — | — | — | — | — |
| 2020–21 | Nomad Nur-Sultan | KAZ | 9 | 0 | 5 | 5 | 4 | — | — | — | — | — |
| 2020–21 | HC Tambov | VHL | 25 | 0 | 3 | 3 | 19 | 4 | 0 | 0 | 0 | 2 |
| 2021–22 | Saryarka Karaganda | KAZ | 39 | 2 | 5 | 7 | 39 | 16 | 3 | 2 | 5 | 6 |
| 2022–23 | Arlan Kokshetau | KAZ | 34 | 2 | 21 | 23 | 16 | 7 | 0 | 1 | 1 | 4 |
| 2023–24 | Barys Astana | KHL | 17 | 0 | 0 | 0 | 2 | — | — | — | — | — |
| 2023–24 | Arlan Kokshetau | KAZ | 7 | 0 | 1 | 1 | 6 | 4 | 0 | 0 | 0 | 0 |
| KHL totals | | | 129 | 1 | 3 | 4 | 25 | 4 | 0 | 0 | 0 | 0 |

=== International ===
| Year | Team | Event | Result | GP | G | A | Pts | PIM |
|---|---|---|---|---|---|---|---|---|
| 2015 | Kazakhstan | WJC18-D1 | 13th | 5 | 0 | 1 | 1 | 4 |
| 2016 | Kazakhstan | WJC18-D1 | 15th | 5 | 0 | 1 | 1 | 0 |
| 2016 | Kazakhstan | WJC-D1 | 17th | 5 | 0 | 0 | 0 | 2 |
| 2017 | Kazakhstan | WJC-D1 | 13th | 5 | 0 | 2 | 2 | 2 |
| 2017 | Kazakhstan | WC-D1 | 19th | 5 | 0 | 0 | 0 | 2 |
| 2018 | Kazakhstan | WJC-D1 | 11th | 5 | 0 | 1 | 1 | 0 |
| 2018 | Kazakhstan | WC-D1 | 19th | 5 | 0 | 1 | 1 | 2 |
| 2023 | Kazakhstan | WC | 11th | 7 | 0 | 0 | 0 | 2 |
| Junior totals | | | | 25 | 0 | 5 | 5 | 8 |
| Senior totals | | | | 17 | 0 | 1 | 1 | 6 |
