= Thomas Thiry =

French ice hockey player (born 1997)

- Born: 9 September 1997 (age 29) Saint-Germain-en-Laye, France
- Height: 6 ft 3 in (191 cm)
- Weight: 220 lb (100 kg; 15 st 10 lb)
- Position: Defence
- Shoots: Right
- NL team Former teams: HC Ajoie; EV Zug; SC Bern
- National team: France
- Playing career: 2017–present

Thomas Thiry (born 9 September 1997) is a French professional ice hockey player who is a defenceman for HC Ajoie of the National League (NL). He previously played with EV Zug and SC Bern. Thiry plays with a Swiss-player license in the NL.

== Playing career ==
Thiry made his National League debut during the 2017–18 season with EV Zug.

On November 25, 2019, Thiry signed a two-year contract with SC Bern, starting with the 2020/21 season and through the 2021/22 season.

== International play ==
He represented France at the 2019 IIHF World Championship.

== Career statistics ==
=== Regular season and playoffs ===
			Regular season					Playoffs
Season	Team	League	GP	G	A	Pts	PIM	GP	G	A	Pts	PIM
2017–18	EVZ Academy	SL	10	1	0	1	2	—	—	—	—	—
2017–18	EV Zug	NL	35	0	3	3	8	2	0	0	0	0
2018–19	EV Zug	NL	49	3	3	6	32	14	0	1	1	6
2018–19	EVZ Academy	SL	1	0	1	1	2	—	—	—	—	—
2019–20	EV Zug	NL	46	1	4	5	16	—	—	—	—	—
2019–20	EVZ Academy	SL	2	0	0	0	0	—	—	—	—	—
2020–21	SC Bern	NL	42	0	5	5	34	8	0	0	0	6
2021–22	SC Bern	NL	48	2	6	8	51	—	—	—	—	—
2022–23	HC Ajoie	NL	50	1	3	4	19	5	0	0	0	4
2023–24	HC Ajoie	NL	52	0	6	6	18	-	-	-	-	-
NL totals			322	7	30	37	178	29	0	1	1	16
SL totals			13	1	1	2	4	–	–	–	–	–

=== Tournament ===
Year	Team	Event	Result	GP	G	A	Pts	PIM
2016	Genève-Servette HC	Swiss Cup	Round of 16	1	0	1	1	0
2016	France U20	Coupe de la Ligue	Regulation Round	4	0	0	0	0
2017	Genève-Servette HC	Swiss Cup	2nd place, silver medalist(s)	1	0	1	1	0
2018	EVZ Academy	Swiss Cup	Round of 32	1	0	0	0	2
2017–18	EV Zug	CHL	Round of 16	2	0	0	0	0
2018	EV Zug	Swiss Cup	Quarter-finals	2	0	0	0	0
2018–19	EV Zug	CHL	Round of 16	8	0	0	0	2
2019	EV Zug	Swiss Cup	1st place, gold medalist(s)	5	0	0	0	2
2019–20	EV Zug	CHL	Quarter-finals	10	0	0	0	0
2020	EV Zug	Swiss Cup	Quarter-finals	3	0	1	1	0
2021	SC Bern	Swiss Cup	1st place, gold medalist(s)	4	0	0	0	0
2022–23	HC Ajoie	NL Qualification	Maintain in NL	4	0	1	1	4

=== International ===
Year	Team	Event	Result	GP	G	A	Pts	PIM
2014	France	WJC-18 D1A	5th	5	0	0	0	0
2015	France	WJC-18 D1A	3rd place, bronze medalist(s)	5	0	0	0	2
2015	France	WJC 1B	4th	5	0	0	0	0
2016	France	WJC 1B	Promoted to the 2017 Division I A	4	0	1	1	2
2017	France	WJC 1A	3rd place, bronze medalist(s)	5	0	2	2	4
2018	France	WC	12th	5	0	0	0	0
2019	France	WC	15th – Relegation to Division I A	7	0	0	0	2
2021	France	OG DNQ	Final Round	3	0	0	0	2
2022	France	WC	12th	7	0	0	0	4
2023	France	WC	12th	5	0	0	0	2
2024	France	WC	14th	6	0	0	0	0
2026	France	OG	11th	3	0	0	0	0
2026	France	WC D1A	3rd	5	0	1	1	0
Junior totals				24	0	3	3	8
Senior totals				41	0	1	1	10

== Awards and honours ==
Award	Year	Ref
Swiss Cup
Champion	2019–2021	
International
WJC-18 D1A (bronze)	2015	
WJC-18 D1A Top Player on Team	2015	
WJC 1B (gold)	2016	
WJC 1B Best Plus/Minus	2016	
WJC 1A (bronze)	2017	
