= Henrik Karlsson =

Swedish-Kazakhstani ice hockey player

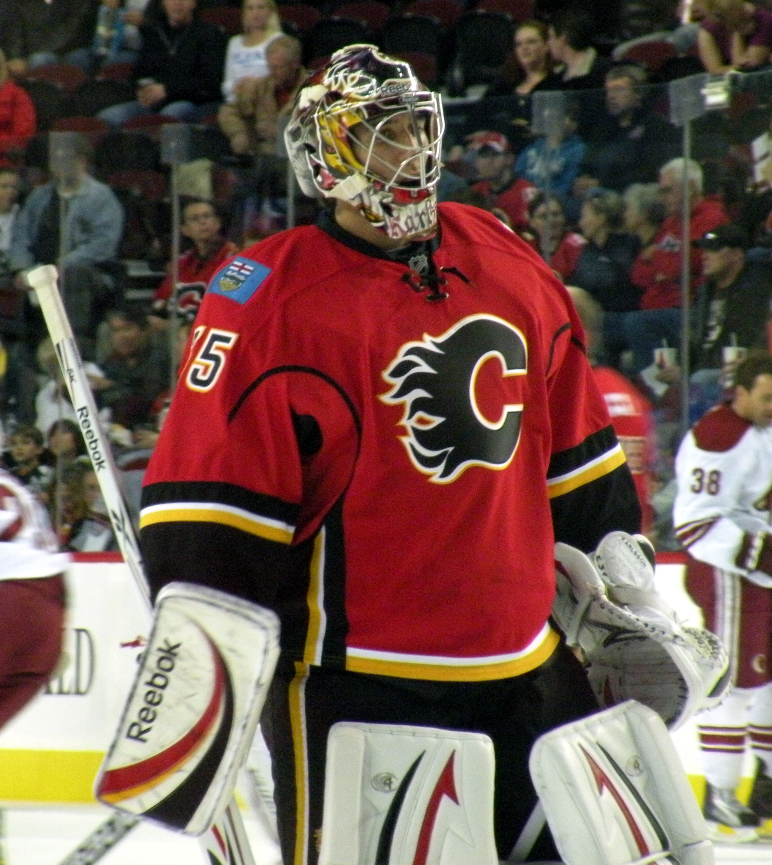
- Karlsson with the Calgary Flames in 2010
- Born: 27 November 1983 (age 42) Stockholm, Sweden
- Height: 6 ft 5 in (196 cm)
- Weight: 215 lb (98 kg; 15 st 5 lb)
- Position: Goaltender
- Caught: Left
- Played for: Södertälje SK; Färjestads BK; Calgary Flames; Skellefteå AIK; Avangard Omsk; Jokerit; Barys Astana
- National team: Kazakhstan
- NHL draft: Undrafted
- Playing career: 2002–2021

Henrik Bjorn Karlsson (born 27 November 1983) is a Swedish-Kazakhstani former professional ice hockey goaltender. He played 26 games in the National Hockey League with the Calgary Flames during the 2010–11 and 2011–12 seasons. The rest of his career, which lasted from 2002 to 2021, was spent in Sweden and then in the Kontinental Hockey League. Internationally Karlsson, who was born in Sweden, played for the Kazakhstani national team at two World Championships.

== Playing career ==
A player undrafted in the NHL, Karlsson spent the majority of the 2008–09 season in the HockeyAllsvenskan with the Malmö Redhawks, but appeared in seven games in the Elitserien with Södertälje. He was signed as a free agent by the San Jose Sharks before the 2009–10 season, but was returned to Sweden and took up starting duties with Färjestad. Karlsson appeared in 34 games, posting four shutouts and a 2.45 goals against average. He suffered an injury late in the season that prevented him from playing in the playoffs as Färjestad was eliminated in the first round. He finished fourth in the league save percentage and tied for second in shutouts.

Facing bleak prospects of playing with the Sharks in 2010–11, he contemplated signing with a team in the Kontinental Hockey League before his NHL rights were dealt by the Sharks to the Calgary Flames for a sixth-round pick at the 2010 NHL entry draft. The Flames quickly signed Karlsson to a new one-year contract, and was expected to compete for the backup role to starter Miikka Kiprusoff. He described the chance to play in the NHL as "a dream come true".

Karlsson made his NHL debut on 22 October 2010, a 6–2 victory over the Columbus Blue Jackets. He became only the third goaltender in Flames' franchise history (after Jim Craig and Tyler Moss) to win his first game. He appeared in 17 games as the Flames' backup, finishing with a 4–5–6 record and a goals against average of 2.38. Following the season, he re-signed with the team, agreeing to a two-year deal worth $1.725 million. Karlsson struggled early in the 2011–12 NHL season, failing to win his first five decisions before suffering a torn medial collateral ligament in a game against the Vancouver Canucks on 4 December that caused him to miss two months of play. When he returned to action, he was often passed over for third goaltender Leland Irving when the team wanted to rest Kiprusoff and consequently appeared in only nine games during the season. He started the final game of the year, a 5–2 victory over the Anaheim Ducks. It was his only win of the season, and his first since 21 January 2011.

On 21 January 2013, Karlsson was traded by the Flames to the Chicago Blackhawks for a seventh-round pick in the 2013 NHL entry draft. The Blackhawks immediately assigned him to their AHL affiliate, the Rockford IceHogs. He was recalled that season during the playoffs. The Blackhawks won the Stanley Cup that season, but he did not qualify to have his name on the Stanley Cup even though he dressed for the first 5 playoff games. He was awarded a Stanley Cup for his efforts.

On 25 June 2013, Karlsson left North America and returned to Sweden signing a one-year contract with Skellefteå AIK of the SHL. However, he left during the 2013-14 season and accepted an offer from Avangard Omsk of the Kontinental Hockey League (KHL), where he stayed for the remainder of the campaign. Karlsson then embarked on a two-year stint with fellow KHL side Jokerit of Helsinki, Finland. After the conclusion of the 2015–16 season, he moved on to Barys Astana, also competing in the KHL.

== Career statistics ==
=== Regular season and playoffs ===
			Regular season										Playoffs
Season	Team	League	GP	W	L	T	OTL	MIN	GA	SO	GAA	SV%	GP	W	L	MIN	GA	SO	GAA	SV%
2000–01	Hammarby IF J18	SWE U18	2	—	—	—	—	120	7	0	3.50	.883	—	—	—	—	—	—	—	—
2000–01	Hammarby IF U20	SWE U20	13	—	—	—	—	706	56	0	4.76	.893	—	—	—	—	—	—	—	—
2001–02	Hammarby IF U20	SWE U20	23	—	—	—	—	1356	97	0	4.34	.886	—	—	—	—	—	—	—	—
2002–03	Botkyrka HC	SWE-3	—	—	—	—	—	—	—	—	2.58	.913	—	—	—	—	—	—	—	—
2003–04	Botkyrka HC	SWE-3	21	—	—	—	—	—	—	—	2.49	.914	—	—	—	—	—	—	—	—
2004–05	IK Oskarshamn	SWE-2	11	—	—	—	—	613	25	1	2.45	.914	—	—	—	—	—	—	—	—
2004–05	Olofströms IK	SWE-3	1	—	—	—	—	60	0	1	0.00	1.000	—	—	—	—	—	—	—	—
2005–06	IK Oskarshamn	SWE-2	1	0	1	0	—	25	2	0	4.54	.850	—	—	—	—	—	—	—	—
2006–07	IF Hammarby	SWE-2	35	11	17	—	4	1893	111	1	3.52	.895	—	—	—	—	—	—	—	—
2007–08	IF Hammarby	SWE-2	29	4	24	—	1	1692	109	1	3.86	.902	—	—	—	—	—	—	—	—
2007–08	Malmö Redhawks	SWE-2	3	3	0	—	0	180	8	0	2.67	.913	—	—	—	—	—	—	—	—
2008–09	Malmö Redhawks	SWE-2	32	16	15	—	0	1888	77	4	2.38	.923	—	—	—	—	—	—	—	—
2008–09	Södertälje SK	SWE	7	3	3	—	0	410	17	0	2.49	.929	—	—	—	—	—	—	—	—
2009–10	Färjestad BK	SWE	34	18	15	—	0	1934	79	3	2.45	.914	—	—	—	—	—	—	—	—
2010–11	Calgary Flames	NHL	17	4	5	—	6	838	36	0	2.58	.908	—	—	—	—	—	—	—	—
2011–12	Calgary Flames	NHL	9	1	4	—	2	455	24	0	3.17	.900	—	—	—	—	—	—	—	—
2011–12	Abbotsford Heat	AHL	4	2	2	—	0	239	9	0	2.26	.903	—	—	—	—	—	—	—	—
2012–13	Rockford IceHogs	AHL	18	11	5	—	0	1007	48	0	2.86	.898	—	—	—	—	—	—	—	—
2013–14	Skellefteå AIK	SWE	19	11	5	—	0	1044	37	3	2.13	.917	—	—	—	—	—	—	—	—
2013–14	Avangard Omsk	KHL	8	2	4	—	0	357	13	0	2.18	.917	—	—	—	—	—	—	—	—
2014–15	Jokerit	KHL	39	24	13	—	2	2340	82	3	2.10	.922	9	4	5	549	20	1	2.18	.924
2015–16	Jokerit	KHL	45	25	14	—	4	2579	89	4	2.07	.924	6	2	4	360	17	0	2.83	.894
2016–17	Barys Astana	KHL	46	25	19	—	1	2604	110	7	2.53	.920	10	4	6	638	28	0	2.64	.917
2017–18	Barys Astana	KHL	45	18	22	—	3	2437	110	4	2.71	.912	—	—	—	—	—	—	—	—
2018–19	Barys Astana	KHL	45	25	13	—	4	2549	86	5	2.02	.928	11	4	5	565	24	0	2.55	.911
2019–20	Barys Nur-Sultan	KHL	20	12	5	—	0	1014	37	2	2.19	.925	1	0	0	20	0	0	0.00	1.000
2020–21	Barys Nur-Sultan	KHL	29	16	10	—	3	1674	64	3	2.29	.927	2	0	1	77	6	0	4.72	.854
NHL totals			26	5	9	—	8	1292	60	0	2.79	.905	—	—	—	—	—	—	—	—

=== International ===
Year	Team	Event	GP	W	L	T	MIN	GA	SO	GAA	SV%
2018	Kazakhstan	WC IA	5	3	2	0	300	10	1	2.00	.937
2019	Kazakhstan	WC IA	4	4	0	0	244	6	0	1.48	.916
Senior totals			9	7	2	0	544	16	5	1.76	.930
