= Ivan Deluca =

Italian ice hockey player (born 1997)

- Born: 28 July 1997 (age 28) Vipiteno, Italy
- Height: 1.93 m (6 ft 4 in)
- Weight: 100 kg (220 lb; 15 st 10 lb)
- Position: Forward
- Shoots: Left
- ICEHL team Former teams: HC Pustertal Wölfe; WSV Sterzing Broncos; HC Bozen–Bolzano
- National team: Italy
- NHL draft: Undrafted
- Playing career: 2013–present

Ivan Deluca (born 28 July 1997) is an Italian professional ice hockey player who is a forward for HC Pustertal Wölfe of the ICE Hockey League (ICEHL).

== International play ==
He represented Italy national team at the 2019 IIHF World Championship.

== Career statistics ==
=== Regular season and playoffs ===
			Regular season					Playoffs
Season	Team	League	GP	G	A	Pts	PIM	GP	G	A	Pts	PIM
2013–14	Sterzing/Vipiteno U20	Italy U20	16	6	4	10	6	3	0	1	1	0
2013–14	Sterzing/Vipiteno	Italy	9	1	0	1	0	—	—	—	—	—
2014–15	Sterzing/Vipiteno U20	Italy U20	17	10	4	14	12	5	0	1	1	4
2014–15	Sterzing/Vipiteno	Italy	38	1	0	1	10	4	1	0	1	0
2015–16	Sterzing/Vipiteno U20	Italy U20	9	4	3	7	6	1	0	1	1	0
2015–16	Sterzing/Vipiteno	Italy	23	1	0	1	2	9	1	0	1	2
2016–17	Sterzing/Vipiteno	AlpsHL	36	5	12	17	24	—	—	—	—	—
2016–17	Sterzing/Vipiteno II	Italy3	1	2	0	2	0	1	1	0	1	0
2017–18	Sterzing/Vipiteno	AlpsHL	35	10	7	17	26	4	1	1	2	2
2017–18	Sterzing/Vipiteno	Italy	1	0	0	0	0	—	—	—	—	—
2018–19	HC Bolzano	EBEL	54	6	7	13	22	5	1	1	2	2
2019–20	HC Bolzano	EBEL	46	3	4	7	16	1	0	0	0	0
2019–20	Sterzing/Vipiteno	AlpsHL	5	2	4	6	4	—	—	—	—	—
2020–21	HC Bolzano	ICEHL	40	3	6	9	4	14	0	0	0	0
2021–22	HC Pustertal	ICEHL	45	5	5	10	12	4	0	0	0	0
2022–23	HC Pustertal	ICEHL	45	7	2	9	41	—	—	—	—	—
2023–24	HC Pustertal	ICEHL	47	5	3	8	20	14	0	1	1	6
2024–25	HC Pustertal	ICEHL	33	1	3	4	31	8	0	1	1	2
2025–26	HC Pustertal	ICEHL	35	2	2	4	6	13	1	0	1	6
2025–26	Sterzing/Vipiteno	Italy	2	0	0	0	2	—	—	—	—	—
ICEHL (EBEL) totals			345	32	32	64	152	59	2	3	5	16

=== International ===
Year	Team	Event	GP	G	A	Pts	PIM
2014	Italy U18	WJC-18 (D1A)	5	0	0	0	4
2015	Italy U18	WJC-18 (D1B)	5	2	1	3	0
2017	Italy U20	WJC-20 (D1B)	5	2	0	2	4
2018	Italy	WC (D1A)	5	1	5	6	2
2019	Italy	WC	7	0	0	0	0
2021	Italy	WC	7	0	1	1	4
2021	Italy	OGQ	3	0	0	0	0
2022	Italy	WC	7	0	0	0	0
2023	Italy	WC (D1A)	5	0	1	1	4
2024	Italy	WC (D1A)	5	0	0	0	4
2026	Italy	WC	5	0	0	0	2
Junior totals			15	4	1	5	8
Senior totals			44	1	7	8	16
