= Brendan Brooks =

Canadian-British ice hockey player (born 1978)

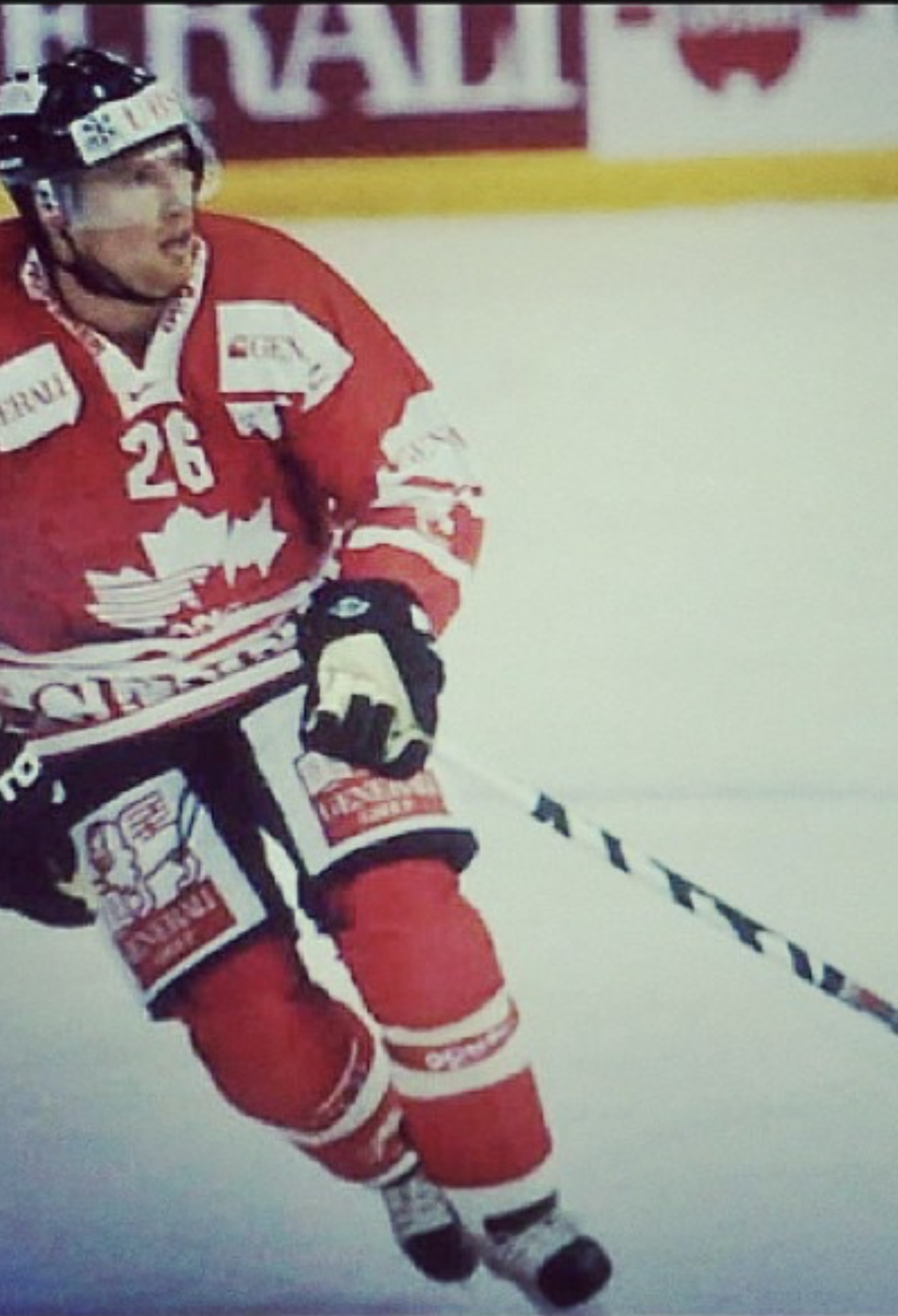
- Born: November 26, 1978 (age 47) St. Catharines, Ontario, Canada
- Height: 5 ft 10 in (178 cm)
- Weight: 185 lb (84 kg; 13 st 3 lb)
- Position: Centre/Right Wing
- Shot: Right
- Played for: Lowell Lock Monsters; Manchester Monarchs; Worcester IceCats; Peoria Rivermen (ECHL); Peoria Rivermen (AHL); Grand Rapids Griffins; Manitoba Moose; Stavanger Oilers; SCL Tigers; Hamburg Freezers; Iserlohn Roosters; Bakersfield Condors; Fife Flyers; Braehead Clan; Sheffield Steelers; Manchester Storm
- National team: Great Britain
- Playing career: 1998–2019

Brendan Brooks (born November 26, 1978) is a retired Canadian-British professional ice hockey player who last played with Manchester Storm.

He previously played in the UK for the Sheffield Steelers, Fife Flyers and Braehead Clan.

He was also formerly a player/assistant coach to head coach John Tripp at Braehead Clan.

Brooks had rejoined Braehead in June 2017 from the Fife Flyers after playing one season, having dressed for Braehead during 2015–16.

Brooks previously played for Stavanger Oilers in the Norwegian GET-ligaen, but the club was no longer able to finance Brooks' contract and the SCL Tigers in the Swiss National League A. He has formerly played several seasons in AHL and played under contract for the Detroit Red Wings and St. Louis Blues. He is known for his speed and goal scoring capability.

Brooks has also played internationally for Great Britain.
