= Balázs Sebők =

Hungarian ice hockey player (born 1994)

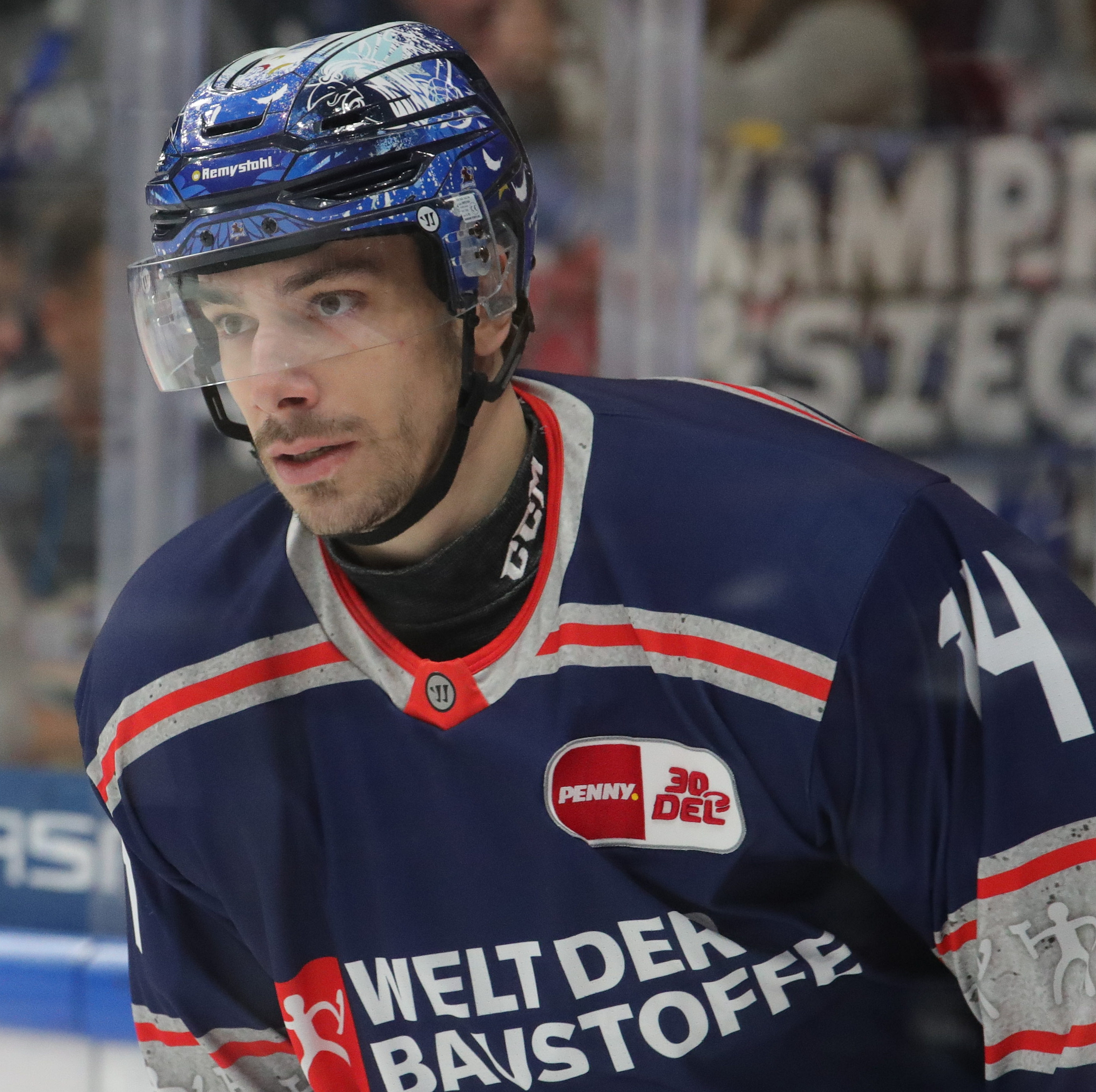
- Sebők in 2023
- Born: 14 December 1994 (age 31) Budapest, Hungary
- Height: 186 cm (6 ft 1 in)
- Weight: 84 kg (185 lb; 13 st 3 lb)
- Position: Forward
- Catches: Right
- Liiga team Former teams: Ässät; KalPa; Ilves; Iserlohn Roosters; Fehérvár AV19
- National team: Hungary
- Playing career: 2014–present

Sebők Balázs (born 14 December 1994) is a Hungarian professional ice hockey player who is a forward for Ässät of the Liiga.

He is fluent in Finnish.
