= Sean McMonagle =

Canadian-born Italian ice hockey player

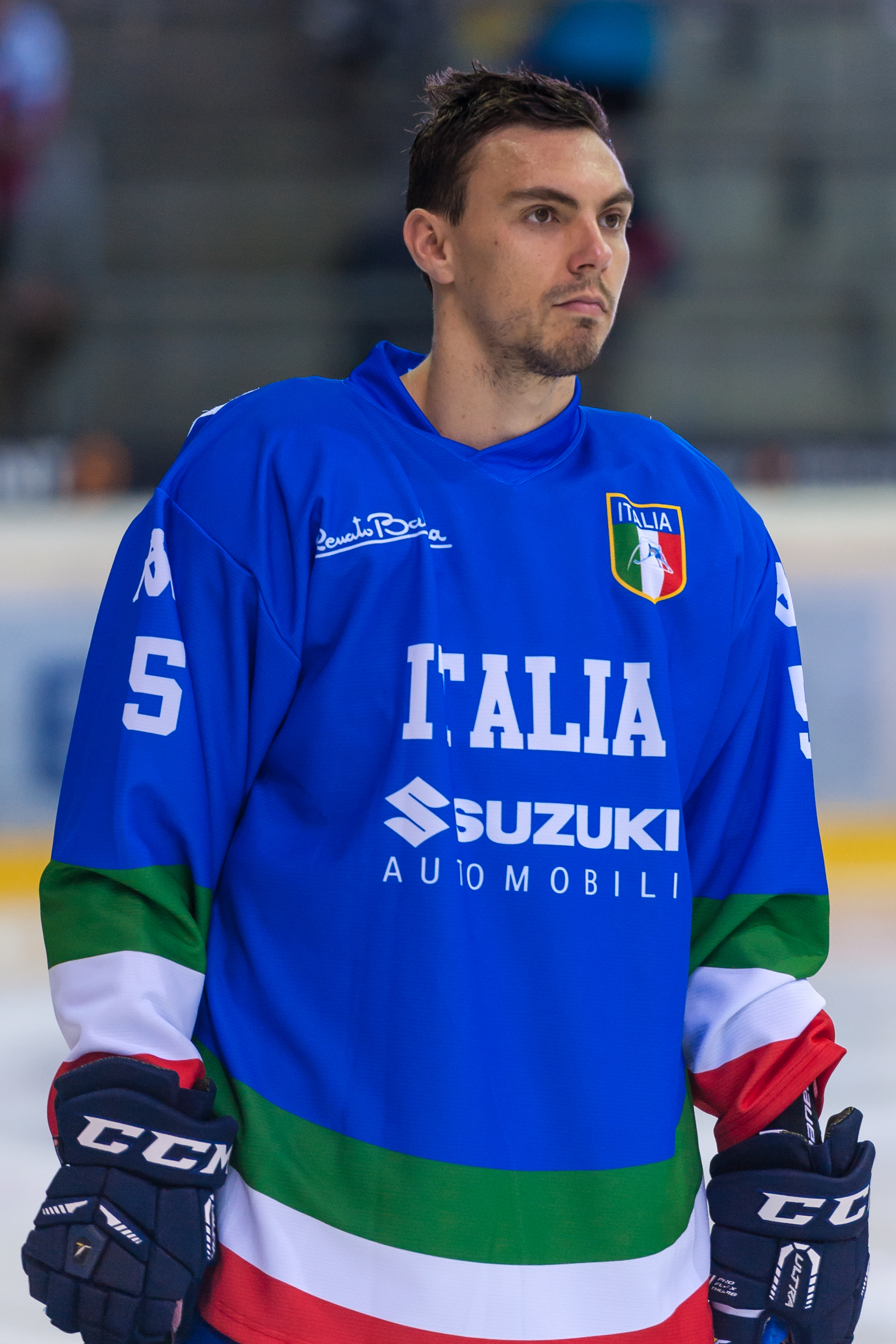
- Born: 19 January 1988 (age 38) Oakville, Ontario, Canada
- Height: 1.85 m (6 ft 1 in)
- Weight: 88 kg (194 lb; 13 st 12 lb)
- Position: Defence
- Shoots: Left
- EIHL team Former teams: Cardiff Devils; Las Vegas Wranglers; Tingsryds AIF; Alleghe Hockey; Rote Teufel Bad Nauheim; HC Bozen–Bolzano; Orli Znojmo; Dornbirner EC; Frisk Asker Ishockey
- National team: Italy
- NHL draft: Undrafted
- Playing career: 2010–present

Sean McMonagle (born 19 January 1988) is a Canadian-born Italian ice hockey player who most recently played for the Cardiff Devils in the Elite Ice Hockey League (EIHL) and the Italian national team.

He represented Italy at the 2019 IIHF World Championship.
