= Tommaso Goi =

Italian ice hockey player

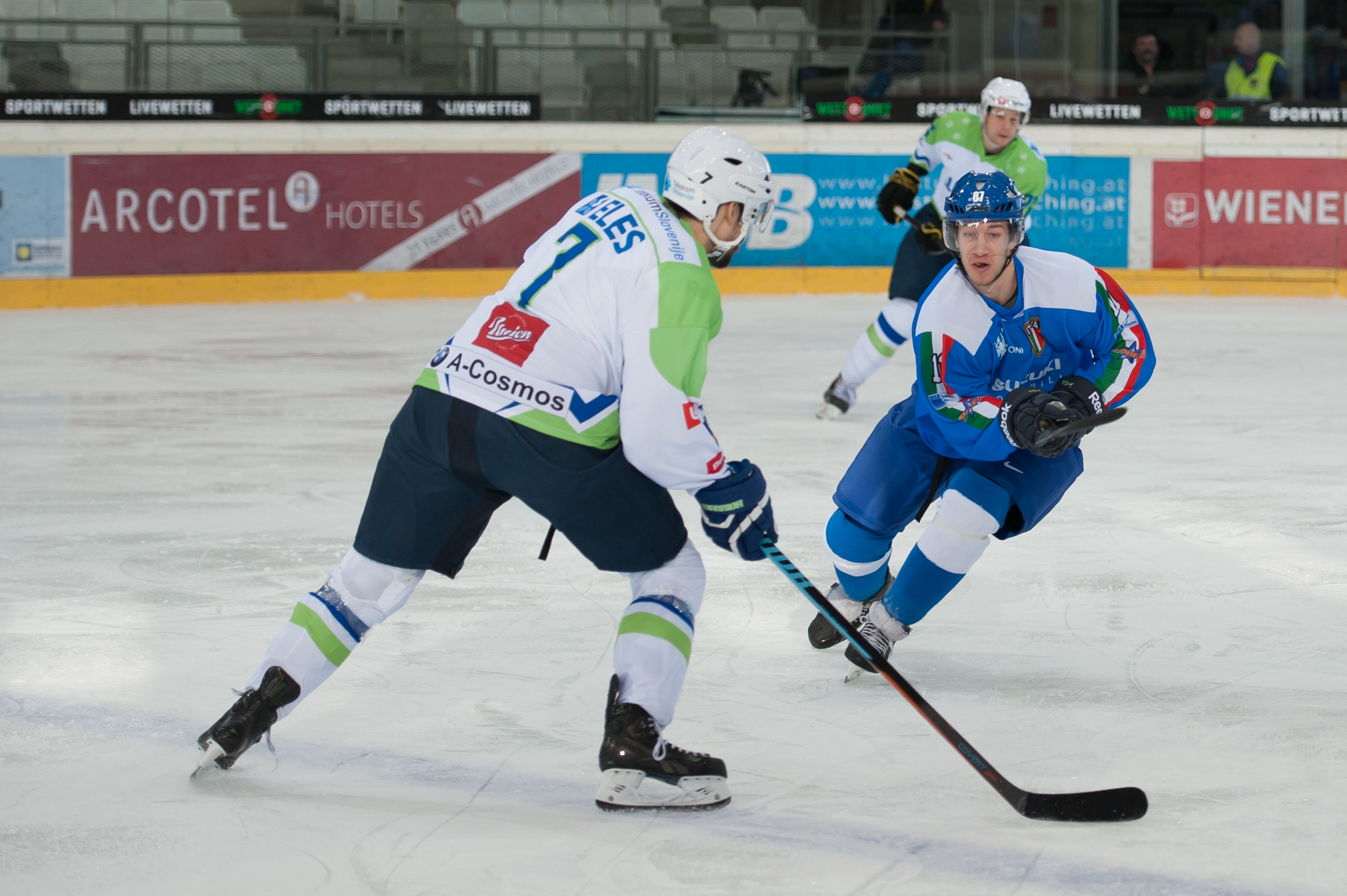
- Born: January 8, 1990 (age 35); Varese, Italy
- Height: 5 ft 11 in (180 cm)
- Weight: 168 lb (76 kg; 12 st 0 lb)
- Position: Forward
- Shot: Left
- Played for: HC Lugano; Hockey Milano Rossoblu; HC Gherdëina; HC Ambrì-Piotta
- National team: Italy
- Playing career: 2006–2021

Tommaso Goi (born January 8, 1990) is an Italian former professional ice hockey player who last played under contract with HC Ambrì-Piotta of the Swiss National League (NL) and the Italian national team.

He participated at the 2017 IIHF World Championship.
