= Ádám Vay =

Hungarian ice hockey player (born 1994)

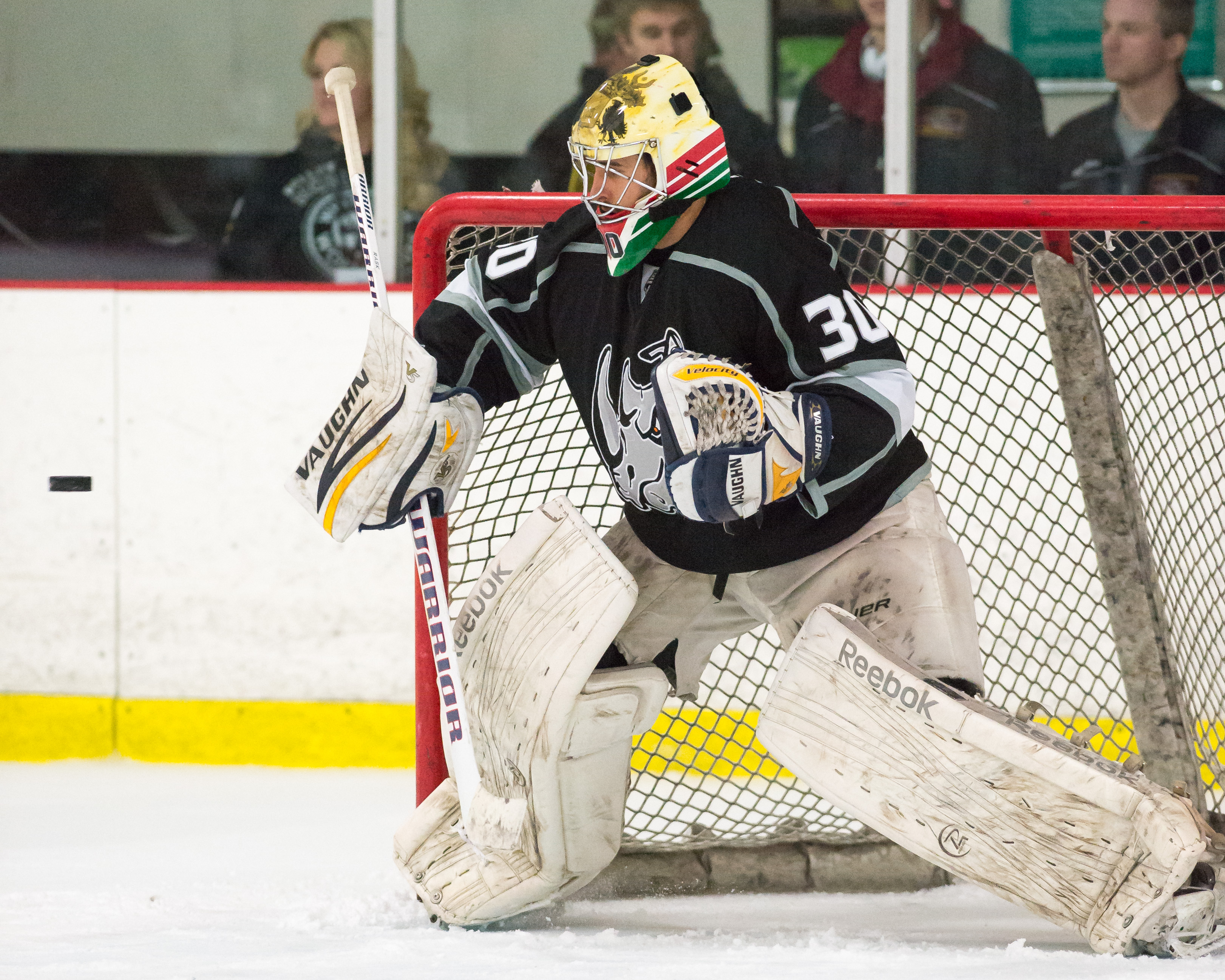
- Vay with the El Paso Rhinos in 2014
- Born: 22 March 1994 (age 32) Budapest, Hungary
- Height: 6 ft 5 in (196 cm)
- Weight: 209 lb (95 kg; 14 st 13 lb)
- Position: Goaltender
- Catches: Left
- 1st.CZE team Former teams: Piráti Chomutov; Székesfehérvár; El Paso Rhinos; Debreceni HK; Iowa Wild; Quad City Mallards; Rapid City Rush; DVTK Jegesmedvék; Västerviks IK; HC '05 Banská Bystrica; HK Poprad; HC Košice; Fassa
- National team: Hungary
- NHL draft: Undrafted
- Playing career: 2010–present

Ádám Vay (born 22 March 1994) is a Hungarian professional ice hockey player who is a goaltender for Piráti Chomutov of the 1st Czech Republic Hockey League.

== Playing career ==
=== Amateur ===
Vay's career began in the 2009–10 season when he was 15 years old. He played for SHK KSK Bratislava in the Slovakian U18 2 league where he played just six games during the regular season. Vay was also chosen to represent Hungary on the IIHF's U18 World Junior Championships D1 tournament where he was between the pipes during two games. In the 2010–11 season, Vay left the SHK KSK Bratislava and joined SAPA AV19 Székesfehérvár II. Vay was again chosen to represent Hungary on the IIHF's U18 World Junior Championships D1 tournament and also one level up on the U20 World Junior Championships D2 tournament. In the 2011–12 season, Vay moved back to the Slovakian junior leagues to play for HK Trnava in the U18 2 and U20 leagues. He played 24 games in the U18 2 league with 1.56 goals allowed on average per game and a save percentage of .950 before being promoted to the U20 team. Vay was yet again chosen to represent Hungary in the IIHF's World Junior Championships, this time in the U18 D1B tournament. By the 2012–13 season, Vay moved up in the junior leagues to join the Patriot Budapest of the Kontinental Hockey League-affiliated Minor Hockey League but only played in nine games during the regular season.

For 2013–14 season, Vay headed to North America and joined the El Paso Rhinos of the non-USA Hockey junior level Western States Hockey League. In his first season with the Rhinos, they won the WSHL and United Hockey Union championships. He also had the best goals allowed average per game (1.76) and best save-percentage (.936) in the league. He returned to the Rhinos for the 2014–15 season where he continued to have good statistics but would lose the WSHL championship series.

=== Professional ===
Having aged out of juniors for the 2015–16 season, Vay moved back to Europe to join the Hungarian Debreceni HK in MOL Liga. He played as the team's top goaltender and after Debreceni HK's season was over Vay was selected to represent Hungary at the 2016 IIHF World Championship. Vay played in just three games at the World Championship where his team would finish 15th of 16 and end up relegated back to Division I but still was able to get noticed by scouts for the National Hockey League. On 18 May 2016, after Hungary's tournament was over, the Minnesota Wild announced that they had signed Ádám Vay to a two-year, entry-level contract and was expected to compete for playing time in one of Minnesota's minor league affiliates, such as the Iowa Wild (AHL) or Quad City Mallards (ECHL). While he spent some time as the backup goaltender with the Iowa Wild during the 2016–17 season, he never appeared in an AHL game and spent most of the season with the Mallards. In 2017–18, he began the season with the AHL Wild and made his first appearance for the team on 28 October 2017. On 11 November 2017, he was assigned to play for the Rapid City Rush in the ECHL.

On 25 May 2018, Vay signed with Saryarka Karagandy of the Supreme Hockey League (VHL), the second highest league in Russia.
