= Andrei Belevich =

Belarusian ice hockey player (born 1997)

- Born: 27 August 1997 (age 29) Grodno, Belarus
- Height: 1.85 m (6 ft 1 in)
- Weight: 95 kg (209 lb; 14 st 13 lb)
- Position: Centre
- Shoots: Left
- KHL team Former teams: Torpedo Nizhny Novgorod; Yunost Minsk; Dinamo-Molodechno
- National team: Belarus
- NHL draft: Undrafted
- Playing career: 2016–present

Andrei Belevich (born 27 August 1997) is a Belarusian ice hockey player for Torpedo Nizhny Novgorod in the Kontinental Hockey League (KHL) and the Belarusian national team.

He represented Belarus at the 2021 IIHF World Championship.
