= Bence Stipsicz =

Hungarian ice hockey player (born 1997)

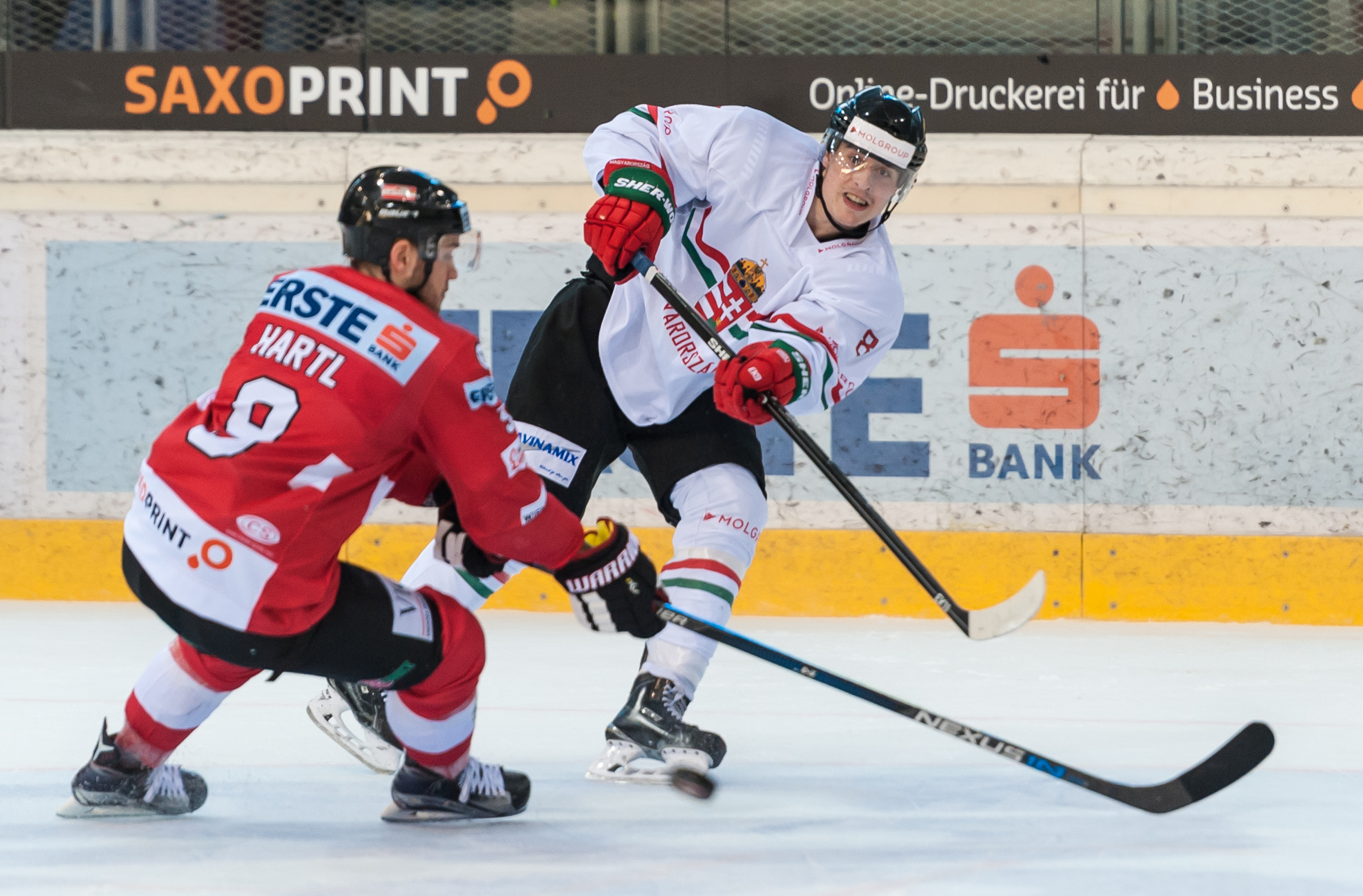
- Born: 3 February 1997 (age 29) Budapest, Hungary
- Height: 6 ft 1 in (185 cm)
- Weight: 190 lb (86 kg; 13 st 8 lb)
- Position: Defence
- Shoots: Left
- ICEHL team Former teams: Fehérvár AV19; MAC Budapest
- National team: Hungary
- NHL draft: Undrafted
- Playing career: 2015–present

Bence Stipsicz (born 3 February 1997) is a Hungarian professional ice hockey player who is a defenceman for Fehérvár AV19 of the ICE Hockey League (ICEHL).
