= Marco De Filippo =

Italian ice hockey player (born 1990)

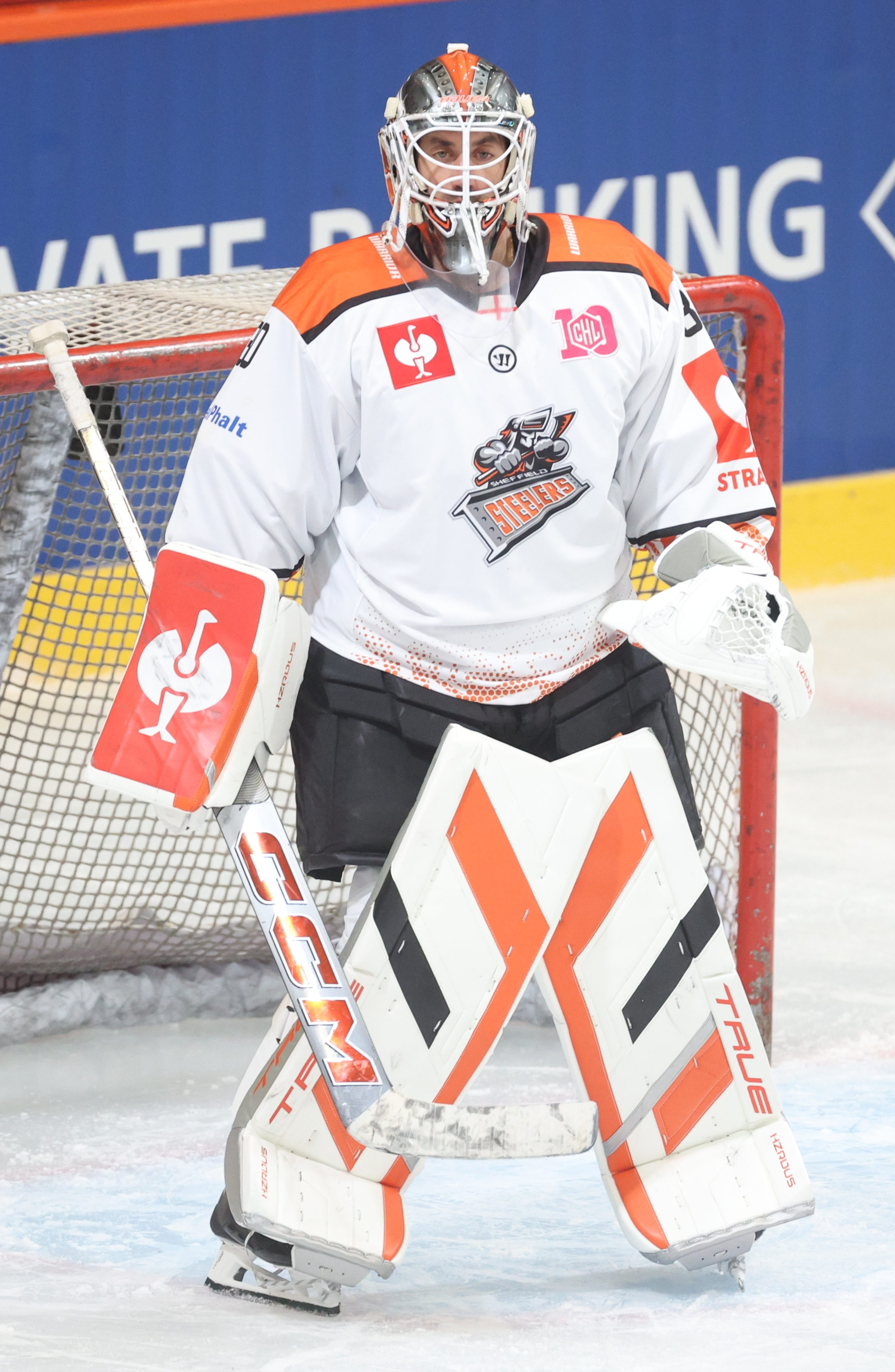
- Marco De Filippo
- Born: 2 August 1990 (age 35) Auronzo di Cadore, Italy
- Height: 1.88 m (6 ft 2 in)
- Weight: 89 kg (196 lb; 14 st 0 lb)
- Position: Goaltender
- Catches: Left
- EIHL team Former teams: Sheffield Steelers; Louisiana IceGators; SG Cortina
- National team: Italy
- NHL draft: Undrafted
- Playing career: 2014–present

Marco De Filippo (born 2 August 1990) is an Italian ice hockey player for Sheffield Steelers and the Italian national team.

He represented Italy at the 2019 IIHF World Championship.
