= 2016 IIHF World U18 Championship Division I =

2016 IIHF U18 World Championship Division I

Tournament details
- Host countries: Belarus; Italy
- Venues: 2 (in 2 host cities)
- Dates: 9–15 April 2016; 18–24 April 2016
- Teams: 12

The 2016 IIHF U18 World Championship Division I was two international under-18 ice hockey tournaments organised by the International Ice Hockey Federation. The Division I A and Division I B tournaments represent the second and the third tier of the IIHF World U18 Championship.

== Division I A ==
The Division I A tournament was played in Minsk, Belarus, from 9 to 15 April 2016.

=== Participants ===
Team	Qualification
Germany	placed 10th in 2015 Top Division and were relegated
Belarus	hosts, placed 2nd in 2015 Division I A
France	placed 3rd in 2015 Division I A
Norway	placed 4th in 2015 Division I A
Kazakhstan	placed 5th in 2015 Division I A
Austria	placed 1st in 2015 Division I B and were promoted

=== Standings ===
Pos	Team	Pld	W	OTW	OTL	L	GF	GA	GD	Pts	Promotion or relegation
1	Belarus	5	4	0	0	1	23	15	+8	12	Promoted to the 2017 Top Division
2	Germany	5	3	1	0	1	20	14	+6	11	
3	Kazakhstan	5	2	1	1	1	17	16	+1	9	
4	France	5	2	0	0	3	18	18	0	6	
5	Norway	5	1	0	1	3	16	22	−6	4	
6	Austria	5	1	0	0	4	11	20	−9	3	Relegated to the 2017 Division I B

Source: IIHF
Rules for classification: 1) points; 2) head-to-head points; 3) head-to-head goal difference; 4) head-to-head number of goals scored; 5) result against closest best-ranked team outside tied teams; 6) result against second-best-ranked team outside tied teams; 7) seeding before tournament.

=== Results ===
All times are local. (Moscow Time – UTC+3)

9 April 2016; 12:00	France	5–2 (1–0, 1–2, 3–0)	Austria	Chizhovka-Arena, Minsk; Attendance: 410

Game reference

Gaetan Richard
Goalies
Jakob Holzer
Referee:
(Czech Republic) Oldrich Hejduk
Linesmen:
(Belarus) Pavel Badyl
(Russia) Stanislav Raming

Addamo (Cantagallo) – 03:06	1–0
	1–1	26:13 – Winkler (Witting, Obersteiner) (PP)
	1–2	34:06 – Winkler (Witting) (PP)
Gleizes (Texier) (PP) – 38:39	2–2
Gleizes (Mathieu) (PP) – 46:29	3–2
Devouassoux (Sarlin) – 52:51	4–2
Munoz (ENG) – 59:42	5–2

10 min
Penalties
8 min
40
Shots
20

9 April 2016; 15:30	Germany	6–3 (2–1, 1–2, 3–0)	Norway	Chizhovka-Arena, Minsk; Attendance: 1200

Game reference

Jonas Steinmann
Goalies
Fredrik Bockmann
Referee:
(Finland) Jari Suorsa
Linesmen:
(Latvia) Maksims Bogdanovs
(Switzerland) Marc-Henri Progin

Kiefersauer – 03:25	1–0
	1–1	08:25 – Karlsen (Ellingsen, Ronnild)
Weyrauch (Latta) – 19:20	2–1
Reichel (Hessler, Jahnke) – 23:47	3–1
	3–2	30:30 – Noer (Ekberg, Harbosen)
	3–3	35:13 – Ekberg (Christensen) (SH)
Latta (Weyrauch, Appendino) – 48:50	4–3
Reichel (Jahnke, Postel) – 52:40	5–3
Latta (Kohler, Weyrauch) – 55:32	6–3

18 min
Penalties
4 min
30
Shots
29

9 April 2016; 19:00	Belarus	5–2 (0–0, 2–2, 3–0)	Kazakhstan	Chizhovka-Arena, Minsk; Attendance: 4700

Game reference

Dzmitry Rodzik
Goalies
Nikita Boyarkin
Referee:
(Latvia) Gints Zviedritis
Linesmen:
(United States) Ryan Daisy
(Czech Republic) Marek Hlavaty

Astashevich (Anosau, Ivanovski) (PP) – 22:14	1–0
	1–1	30:27 – Vakulenko (Sinitsyn, Gabdullin)
Mikalayeu (Bovin) – 30:52	2–1
	2–2	34:43 – Borisevich (Lazarev) (PP)
Sharangovich (Yaromenka, Arlouski) – 41:01	3–2
Mikalayeu (Bovin) – 52:34	4–2
Sushko – 53:08	5–2

10 min
Penalties
6 min
30
Shots
26

10 April 2016; 12:00	Austria	0–2 (0–0, 0–1, 0–1)	Germany	Chizhovka-Arena, Minsk; Attendance: 789

Game reference
Daniel Polzl	Goalies	Mirko Pantkowski	Referee: (Switzerland) Ken Mollard; Linesmen: (Czech Republic) Marek Hlavaty (Switzerland) Mark-Henry Progin
0–1 / 29:49 – Walther (Eder, Busch); 0–2 / 52:01 – Sorames (Postel, Walther)			Referee: (Switzerland) Ken Mollard; Linesmen: (Czech Republic) Marek Hlavaty (Switzerland) Mark-Henry Progin
8 min	Penalties	18 min	Referee: (Switzerland) Ken Mollard; Linesmen: (Czech Republic) Marek Hlavaty (Switzerland) Mark-Henry Progin
17	Shots	25	Referee: (Switzerland) Ken Mollard; Linesmen: (Czech Republic) Marek Hlavaty (Switzerland) Mark-Henry Progin

10 April 2016; 15:30	Kazakhstan	4–3 (1–1, 0–1, 1–1)	France	Chizhovka-Arena, Minsk; Attendance: 530

Game reference

Nikita Boyarkin
Goalies
Gaetan Richard
Referee:
(Finland) Jari Suorsa
Linesmen:
(Latvia) Maksims Bogdanovs
(United States) Ryan Daisy

Pismarkin (Gabdullin, Orekhov) – 04:08	1–0
	1–1	14:54 – Gleizes (Munoz)
	1–2	35:13 – Texier (Robert)
	1–3	45:27 – Texier (Guebey, Prissaint)
Dzhangazinov (Nazarenko) – 47:39	2–3
Sam. Daniyar (Pismarkin, Say. Daniyar) (PP) – 58:13	3–3
Borisevich (Saburov) – 58:46	4–3

0 min
Penalties
12 min
39
Shots
32

10 April 2016; 19:00	Norway	3–6 (3–3, 0–3, 0–0)	Belarus	Chizhovka-Arena, Minsk; Attendance: 5,450

Game reference

Jakob Opsahl
Fredrik Bockmann
Goalies
Dzmitry Rodzik
Aliaksei Patapchanka
Referee:
(Czech Republic) Oldrich Hejduk
Linesmen:
(Japan) Kensuke Kanazawa
(Russia) Stanislav Raming

	0–1	07:19 – Pishchuk (Martyniuk, Sushko) (PP)
Noer (Jessesen) – 14:45	1–1
Pettersen (Johansen) (PP) – 15:25	2–1
Grosvik (Borvik) – 15:42	3–1
	3–2	17:12 – Sokolovski (Arlouski)
	3–3	18:29 – Boubel (Arlouski)
	3–4	20:47 – Martyniuk (Pishchuk)
	3–5	30:56 – Litvinau (Ivanovski)
	3–6	31:40 – Anosau (Bovin)

10 min
Penalties
8 min
19
Shots
37

12 April 2016; 12:00	Germany	4–3 OT (1–1, 1–1, 1–1) (OT 1–0)	Kazakhstan	Chizhovka-Arena, Minsk; Attendance: 789

Game reference

Mirko Pantkowski
Goalies
Nikita Boyarkin
Referee:
(Finland) Jari Suorsa
Linesmen:
(Belarus) Pavel Badyl
(Japan) Kensuke Kanazawa

	0–1	05:16 – Nazarenko (Shulga, Dzhangazinov)
Soramies (Walther, Adam) (PP) – 09:06	1–1
Jahnke (Reichel, Hessler) – 22:48	2–1
	2–2	26:20 – Ponomaryov (Vakulenko, Sinitsyn)
Walther (Soramies, Postel) – 58:39	3–2
	3–3	59:59 – Melikhov (Lazarev) (EA)
Hessler (Jahnke, Appendino) – 61:29	4–3

4 min
Penalties
14 min
44
Shots
24

12 April 2016; 15:30	Austria	2–4 (1–3, 0–1, 1–0)	Norway	Chizhovka-Arena, Minsk; Attendance: 853

Game reference

Jakob Holzer
Daniel Polzl
Goalies
Fredrik Bockmann
Referee:
(Latvia) Gints Zviedritis
Linesmen:
(United States) Ryan Daisy
(Russia) Stanislav Raming

	0–1	02:41 – Harbosen (Ellingsen)
	0–2	10:56 – Karlsen (Borvik, Johansen)
Zitz (Bretschneider, Trothan) – 11:35	1–2
	1–3	18:51 – Pettersen (Johansen) (PP)
	1–4	24:21 – Christensen (Ellingsen, Karlsen) (PP2)
Winkler (Goritschnig, Witting) (PP)	2–4

16 min
Penalties
10 min
15
Shots
34

12 April 2016; 19:00	Belarus	3–2 (1–1, 1–0, 1–1)	France	Chizhovka-Arena, Minsk; Attendance: 6,800

Game reference

Aliaksei Patapchanka
Goalies
Gaetan Richard
Referee:
(Switzerland) Ken Mollard
Linesmen:
(Czech Republic) Marek Hlavaty
(Switzerland) Marc-Henri Progin

Martynau (Martyniuk, Sushko) (PP) – 02:10	1–0
	1–1	15:07 – Guebey (Boudon, Addamo) (PP)
Martyniuk (Mikalayeu) (PP) – 32:35	2–1
Ivanovski (Anosau) – 45:56	3–1
	3–2	47:23 – Mathieu (Bougro, Petit)

8 min
Penalties
59 min
29
Shots
17

13 April 2016; 12:00	Norway	2–3 GWS (2–0, 0–2, 0–0) (OT 0–0) (SO: 0–1)	Kazakhstan	Chizhovka-Arena, Minsk; Attendance: 678

Game reference

Fredrik Bockmann
Goalies
Nikita Boyarkin
Referee:
(Switzerland) Ken Mollard
Linesmen:
(Switzerland) Marc-Henri Progin
(Russia) Stanislav Raming

Johanse (Pettersen, Ekberg) (PP) – 14:34	1–0
Dahl (Ellingsen) – 18:19	2–0
	2–1	21:05 – Daniyar (Gabdullin, Pismarkin)
	2–2	24:15 – Daniyar (Orekhov, Pismarkin)

Karlsen (miss)
Pettersen (miss)
Shootout
Daniyar
Borisevich
10 min
Penalties
12 min
36
Shots
36

13 April 2016; 15:30	France	3–5 (0–1, 2–2, 1–2)	Germany	Chizhovka-Arena, Minsk; Attendance: 630

Game reference

Gaetan Richard
Goalies
Jonas Steinmann
Referee:
(Latvia) Gints Zviedritis
Linesmen:
(Belarus) Pavel Badyl
(United States) Ryan Daisy

	0–1	05:55 – Adam (Postel)
Robert (Berard, Texier) – 20:58	1–1
Bougro (Addamo) (PP) – 24:21	2–1
	2–2	34:12 – Eder (Eckl, Huss)
	2–3	35:08 – Adam (Gawanke, Postel) (PP)
Robert (Texier, Guebey) – 49:26	3–3
	3–4	49:44 – Postel (Busch)
	3–5	59:31 – Kiefersauer (Eder) (ENG)

10 min
Penalties
12 min
34
Shots
41

13 April 2016; 19:00	Belarus	4–5 (2–2, 1–3, 1–0)	Austria	Chizhovka-Arena, Minsk; Attendance: 4,800

Game reference

Dmitri Holzer
Alexei Potapchenko
Goalies
Jakob Holzer
Referee:
(Czech Republic) Oldrich Hejduk
Linesmen:
(Latvia) Maksims Bogdanovs
(Japan) Kensuke Kanazawa

Sushko (Martynyuk, Litvinov) (PP) – 02:45	1–0
	1–1	11:24 – Pusnik (Witting)
	1–2	12:29 – Haberl (Zitz)
Martynov (Martynyuk, Pishuk) (PP) – 16:49	2–2
	2–3	25:59 – Obersteiner (Artner)
	2–4	26:26 – Artner (Maxa)
	2–5	31:39 – Klockl (Demuth)
Sharangovich (Yeryomenko) (PP) – 35:48	3–5
Bovin (Bovbel, Nikolayev) – 43:07	4–5

4 min
Penalties
14 min
38
Shots
16

15 April 2016; 12:00	France	5–4 (1–2, 3–2, 1–0)	Norway	Chizhovka-Arena, Minsk; Attendance: 678

Game reference

Gaetan Richard
Goalies
Fredrik Bockmann
Referee:
(Switzerland) Ken Mollard
Linesmen:
(Latvia) Maksims Bogdanovs
(Czech Republic) Marek Hlavaty

Munoz (Gleizes) – 03:23	1–0
	1–1	14:51 – Karlsen (Pettersen, Borvik)
	1–2	15:38 – Noer (Dahl)
	1–3	21:35 – Pettersen (Karlsen)
Robert (Pascal, Texier) (PP) – 23:23	2–3
Addamo (Bougro) – 31:08	3–3
Munoz (Boudon, Gleizes) – 32:07	4–3
	4–4	33:49 – Karlsen (Ellingsen, Christensen) (PP)
Addamo (Bougro, Guebey) – 40:38	5–4

6 min
Penalties
8 min
27
Shots
28

15 April 2016; 15:30	Kazakhstan	5–2 (1–0, 4–1, 0–1)	Austria	Chizhovka-Arena, Minsk; Attendance: 1000

Game reference

Nikita Boyarkin
Andrei Shutov
Goalies
Jakob Holzer
Daniel Polzl
Referee:
(Finland) Jari Suorsa
Linesmen:
(Belarus) Pavel Badyl
(Japan) Kensuke Kanazawa

Daniyar – 17:18	1–0
Beketayev (Nazarenko) – 21:45	2–0
	2–1	25:29 – Maxa (Goritschnig) (SH)
Dzhangazinov (Shulga) (PP) – 27:49	3–1
Sinitsyn (Durnev) – 32:58	4–1
Borisevich (Polokhov) (PP) – 36:27	5–1
	5–2	55:30 – Konig (Steffler)

10 min
Penalties
6 min
28
Shots
18

15 April 2016; 19:00	Germany	3–5 (1–2, 2–1, 0–2)	Belarus	Chizhovka-Arena, Minsk; Attendance: 9,200

Game reference

Mirko Pantkowski
Goalies
Dmitri Rodik
Referee:
(Czech Republic) Oldrich Hejduk
Linesmen:
(United States) Ryan Daisy
(Russia) Stanislav Raming

	0–1	03:14 – Martynov (Sushko)
	0–2	04:48 – Litvinov (Ivanovski, Deryabin)
Postel – 18:26	1–2
	1–3	23:10 – Ivanovski (Yeryomenko) (PP)
Jahnke (Reichel) – 24:37	2–3
Kiefersauer (Huss, Busch) (PP) – 32:44	3–3
	3–4	44:01 – Pishuk (Yeryomenko)
	3–5	58:12 – Martynov (Sushko)

33 min
Penalties
18 min
18
Shots
25

=== Statistics and awards ===
==== Scoring leaders ====
Pos	Player	Country	GP	G	A	Pts	+/−	PIM
1	Niklas Postel	Germany	5	2	6	8	+3	0
2	Cristoffer Karlsen	Norway	5	4	2	6	0	2
3	Vladislav Martynyuk	Belarus	5	2	4	6	0	4
3	Maksim Sushko	Belarus	5	2	4	6	0	2
3	Alexandre Texier	France	5	2	4	6	+1	6
6	Sayan Daniyar	Kazakhstan	5	4	1	5	+2	0
7	Justin Addamo	France	5	3	2	5	0	27
7	Jean Gleizes	France	5	3	2	5	0	0
7	Mathias Emilio Pettersen	Norway	5	3	2	5	–2	0
10	Leonid Ivanovski	Belarus	5	2	3	5	+2	0
10	Charlie Jahnke	Germany	5	2	3	5	+4	2

GP = Games played; G = Goals; A = Assists; Pts = Points; +/− = P Plus–minus; PIM = Penalties In Minutes

Source: IIHF.com

==== Goaltending leaders ====
(minimum 40% team's total ice time)

Pos	Player	Country	TOI	SA	GA	GAA	Sv%	SO
1	Nikita Boyarkin	Kazakhstan	297:03	151	15	3.03	90.07	0
2	Gaetan Richard	France	297:05	156	17	3.43	89.10	0
3	Mirko Pantkowski	Germany	180:03	66	8	2.67	87.88	1
4	Jakob Holzer	Austria	200:49	122	15	4.48	87.70	0
5	Alexei Potapchenko	Belarus	131:49	38	5	2.28	86.84	0

TOI = Time on ice (minutes:seconds); SA = Shots against; GA = Goals against; GAA = Goals against average; Sv% = Save percentage; SO = Shutouts

Source: IIHF.com

==== IIHF best player awards ====
- Goaltender: (Germany) Mirko Pantkowski
- Defenceman: (Belarus) Vladislav Martynyuk
- Forward: (Kazakhstan) Sayan Daniyar

== Division I B ==
The Division I B tournament was played in Asiago, Italy, from 18 to 24 April 2016.

=== Participants ===
Team	Qualification
Hungary	placed 6th in 2015 Division I A and were relegated
Slovenia	placed 2nd in 2015 Division I B
Japan	placed 3rd in 2015 Division I B
Ukraine	placed 4th in 2015 Division I B
Italy	placed 5th in 2015 Division I B
South Korea	placed 1st in 2015 Division II A and were promoted

=== Standings ===
Pos	Team	Pld	W	OTW	OTL	L	GF	GA	GD	Pts	Promotion or relegation
1	Hungary	5	5	0	0	0	28	11	+17	15	Promoted to the 2017 Division I A
2	Japan	5	4	0	0	1	13	9	+4	12	
3	Ukraine	5	3	0	0	2	17	15	+2	9	
4	Slovenia	5	2	0	0	3	19	17	+2	6	
5	Italy	5	1	0	0	4	12	20	−8	3	
6	South Korea	5	0	0	0	5	10	27	−17	0	Relegated to the 2017 Division II A

Source: IIHF
Rules for classification: 1) points; 2) head-to-head points; 3) head-to-head goal difference; 4) head-to-head number of goals scored; 5) result against closest best-ranked team outside tied teams; 6) result against second-best-ranked team outside tied teams; 7) seeding before tournament.

=== Results ===
All times are local. (Central European Summer Time – UTC+2)

18 April 2016; 13:30	South Korea	2–6 (0–1, 1–1, 1–4)	Hungary	Pala Odegar, Asiago; Attendance: 100

Game reference

Kim Tae-kyung
Goalies
Martin Szeles
Referee:
(Belarus) Vladimir Nalivaiko
Linesmen:
(Germany) Lukas Kohlmuller
(Italy) Ulrich Pardatscher

	0–1	19:14 – Kreisz
Lee C. – 37:07	1–1
	1–2	38:05 – Toth (P. Kiss)
Lee J. (Choi, Lee C.) (PP) – 40:41	2–2
	2–3	44:58 – Szita
	2–4	45:17 – Horvath (R. Kiss, P. Kiss)
	2–5	49:03 – Kreisz (Szita)
	2–6	59:01 – Horvath (P. Kiss)

6 min
Penalties
6 min
31
Shots
47

18 April 2016; 17:00	Ukraine	3–1 (1–1, 1–0, 1–0)	Slovenia	Pala Odegar, Asiago; Attendance: 120

Game reference

Bogdan Dyachenko
Goalies
Luka Sotlar
Referee:
(Poland) Wlodzimierz Marczuk
Linesmen:
(Italy) Christian Cristeli
(Kazakhstan) Mihail Stupak

	0–1	03:58 – Svetina (Brglez)
Stupak (Mazur) (SH) – 15:25	1–1
Stupak (Denyskin, Mazur) – 24:37	2–1
Mazur (Stupak, Shvachka) – 41:49	3–1

10 min
Penalties
14 min
35
Shots
25

18 April 2016; 20:30	Italy	2–3 (2–0, 0–2, 0–1)	Japan	Pala Odegar, Asiago; Attendance: 400

Game reference

Robin Quagliato
Goalies
Ryota Koda
Referee:
(Austria) Stefan Siegel
Linesmen:
(Norway) Havar Dahl
(Austria) Jakob Schauer

de Francesco (Vinatzer, Bergmeister) (PP) – 04:42	1–0
Oberrauch (Spinell, Fink) – 16:32	2–0
	2–1	29:48 – Namae (Takebe, Miura)
	2–2	31:56 – Kobori
	2–3	53:55 – Igari

14 min
Penalties
10 min
33
Shots
30

19 April 2016; 13:30	Hungary	6–2 (2–1, 0–1, 4–0)	Ukraine	Pala Odegar, Asiago; Attendance: 130

Game reference

David Mark Kovacs
Goalies
Bogdan Dyachenko
Referee:
(Austria) Stefan Siegel
Linesmen:
(Italy) Christian Cristeli
(Austria) Jakob Schauer

	0–1	05:16 – Mazur (Merezhko)
Revesz (Szabó) – 06:20	1–1
Almasi (Szita, Peter) (PP) – 13:27	2–1
	2–2	25:47 – Lesnikov (Mkrtchyan)
P. Kiss (Horvath) (PP) – 45:10	3–2
P. Kiss (Toth, Fejes) (PP2) – 55:42	4–2
Kreisz (SH,ENG, AG) – 58:57	5–2
Horvath (SH) – 59:27	6–2

Bruno Kreisz was awarded the goal at 58:57 when Ivan Ganopolsky threw his stick in an attempt to prevent an empty net goal.
16 min
Penalties
16 min
35
Shots
31

19 April 2016; 17:00	Japan	1–0 (1–0, 0–0, 0–0)	South Korea	Pala Odegar, Asiago; Attendance: 100

Game reference
Ryota Koda	Goalies	Kim Tae-kyung	Referee: (Slovakia) Milan Novak; Linesmen: (Italy) Ulrich Pardatscher (France) Gabriel Pointel
Arai (Shimizu) – 10:11 / 1–0			Referee: (Slovakia) Milan Novak; Linesmen: (Italy) Ulrich Pardatscher (France) Gabriel Pointel
12 min	Penalties	16 min	Referee: (Slovakia) Milan Novak; Linesmen: (Italy) Ulrich Pardatscher (France) Gabriel Pointel
25	Shots	21	Referee: (Slovakia) Milan Novak; Linesmen: (Italy) Ulrich Pardatscher (France) Gabriel Pointel

19 April 2016; 20:30	Slovenia	4–2 (0–2, 1–0, 3–0)	Italy	Pala Odegar, Asiago; Attendance: 500

Game reference

Kogovsek
Goalies
Robin Quagliato
Referee:
(Belarus) Vladimir Nalivaiko
Linesmen:
(Germany) Lukas Kohlmuller
(Kazakhstan) Mihail Stupak

	0–1	11:23 – Berger (Gios) (PP)
	0–2	16:27 – Fink (Berger, Oberrauch) (PP)
Sodja (Rajsar) – 33:14	1–2
Ban (Drozg) – 50:53	2–2
Drozg (Klofutar, Ban) – 56:12	3–2
Ban (Matevz, Jugovic) (PP) – 56:46	4–2

37 min
Penalties
12 min
29
Shots
22

21 April 2016; 13:30	Slovenia	1–4 (0–3, 1–0, 0–1)	Japan	Pala Odegar, Asiago; Attendance: 200

Game reference

Luka Sotlar
Goalies
Ryota Koda
Referee:
(Slovakia) Milan Novak
Linesmen:
(Italy) Christian Cristelli
(Italy) Ulrich Padatscher

	0–1	01:58 – Sawade (Yasuda)
	0–2	02:48 – Igari (Kaneko, Aki)
	0–3	08:33 – Iwamura (Sawade, Yasuda)
Svetina (Sturm, Sodja) (PP) – 33:12	1–3
	1–4	41:24 – Sawade

18 min
Penalties
16 min
17
Shots
32

21 April 2016; 17:00	South Korea	3–6 (1–2, 1–2, 1–2)	Ukraine	Pala Odegar, Asiago; Attendance: 150

Game reference

Jong Hun Chun
Goalies
Bogdan Dyachenko
Referee:
(Austria) Stefan Siegel
Linesmen:
(Norway) Havar Dahl
(Germany) Lukas Kohlmuller

	0–1	02:45 – Mazur
Lee J. – 05:40	1–1
	1–2	16:43 – Stupak (Mazur, Grygoryev) (PP)
Kim J. (Lee S., Lee T.) – 27:35	2–2
	2–3	29:11 – Denyskin (Mazur, Stupak)
	2–4	35:18 – Denyskin (Mazur, Merezhko)
	2–5	52:18 – Denyskin (Merezhko, Shevchenko) (PP)
	2–6	55:38 – Ruban (Denyskin)
Lee C. (Chae) – 56:33	3–6

49 min
Penalties
49 min
40
Shots
34

21 April 2016; 20:30	Hungary	7–1 (3–1, 1–0, 3–0)	Italy	Pala Odegar, Asiago; Attendance: 500

Game reference

Martin Szeles
Goalies
Robin Quagliato
Referee:
(Poland) Wlodzimierz Marczuk
Linesmen:
(France) Gabriel Pointel
(Kazakhstan) Mikhail Stupak

Nagy (Szabó) – 02:46	1–0
Szita (Peter, Almasi) – 09:52	2–0
	2–1	17:18 – Spitfaller (Zebetto)
Peter (Almasi, Szita) – 17:57	3–1
Kriesz (Molnar) – 31:40	4–1
Almasi– 45:48	5–1
Horvath (Kiss, Toth) – 46:11	6–1
Revesz – 57:37	7–1

4 min
Penalties
12 min
28
Shots
31

22 April 2016; 13:30	Slovenia	9–3 (3–1, 3–1, 3–1)	South Korea	Pala Odegar, Asiago; Attendance: 150

Game reference

Ziga Kogovsek
Goalies
Kim Tae-kyung
Chun Jong-hun
Referee:
(Poland) Wlodzimierz Marczuk
Linesmen:
(Norway) Havar Dahl
(Germany) Lukas Kohlmuller

	0–1	02:47 – Chae (Lee J.)
Drozg (Petek, Rajsar) (PP) – 08:30	1–1
Sodja (Sturm, Rajsar) – 09:43	2–1
Sturm (Rajsar, Svetina) (PP) – 13:09	3–1
	3–2	25:54 – Lee S. (SH)
Sersen (Brglez, Klofutar) – 27:27	4–2
Petek (Drozg) – 29:25	5–2
Voh – 29:51	6–2
Kujavec (Drozg) – 40:56	7–2
Sturm (Sodja) – 47:40	8–2
Svetina (Brglez) – 56:41	9–2
	9–3	56:57 – Chae (Lee S.)

10 min
Penalties
8 min
39
Shots
21

22 April 2016; 17:00	Japan	2–4 (0–0, 2–2, 0–2)	Hungary	Pala Odegar, Asiago; Attendance: 200

Game reference

Ryota Koda
Goalies
David Mark Kovacs
Referee:
(Belarus) Vladimir Nalivaiko
Linesmen:
(Italy) Christian Cristeli
(Austria) Jakob Schauer

Arai (Kon} – 20:56	1–0
	1–1	23:30 – Szigeti (Vas)
Yasuda (Iwamura, Tokuda) (PP) – 28:04	2–1
	2–2	33:44 – Szita (PS)
	2–3	45:23 – Toth (P. Kiss)
	2–4	59:52 – Horvath (ENG)

6 min
Penalties
8 min
24
Shots
20

22 April 2016; 20:30	Ukraine	4–2 (2–2, 1–0, 1–0)	Italy	Pala Odegar, Asiago; Attendance: 600

Game reference

Bogdan Dyachenko
Goalies
Diego de Silvestro
Referee:
(Slovakia) Milan Novak
Linesmen:
(France) Gabriel Pointel
(Kazakhstan) Mihail Stupak

Stupak (Denyskin, Igor Merezhko) – 12:02	1–0
	1–1	13:33 – Fink (Berger, Spinell)
Grygoryev (Denyskin, Merezhko) – 14:46	2–1
	2–2	15:54 – Topatigh
Grygoryev (Mazur, Merezhko) (PP2) – 24:12	3–2
Chorny (PS) – 47:15	4–2

64 min
Penalties
24 min
36
Shots
24

24 April 2016; 13:30	Japan	3–2 (2–1, 1–1, 0–0)	Ukraine	Pala Odegar, Asiago; Attendance: 150

Game reference

Yasuto Nakajima
Goalies
Bogdan Dyachenko
Referee:
(Belarus) Vladimir Nalivaiko
Linesmen:
(Italy) Ulrich Pardatshcer
(France) Gabriel Pointel

Kobori (Sawade, Tokuda) – 00:58	1–0
Kaneko (Arai, Igari) – 05:19	2–0
	2–1	08:31 – Denyskin (Merezhko, Mazur) (PP)
	2–2	26:17 – Mazur (Denyskin)
Tokuda (Iwamura, Kobori) (PP) – 34:37	3–2

10 min
Penalties
22 min
32
Shots
22

24 April 2016; 17:00	Hungary	5–4 (2–2, 1–1, 2–1)	Slovenia	Pala Odegar, Asiago; Attendance: 250

Game reference

Martin Szeles
David Mark Kovacs
Goalies
Luka Sotlar
Referee:
(Slovakia) Milan Novak
Linesmen:
(Norway) Havar Dahl
(Kazakhstan) Mihail Stupak

Szita (Peter) – 01:19	1–0
Szita (R. Kiss) (PP) – 04:13	2–0
	2–1	14:24 – Tislar (Jugovic, Ban) (PP)
	2–2	17:05 – Urukalo (Rajsar, Svetina) (PP2)
Molnar (Bugar, Szigeti) – 23:46	3–2
	3–3	31:50 – Sodja (Petek) (PP2)
P. Kiss (Horvath) – 51:29	4–3
	4–4	55:46 – Drozg (Ban) (SH)
P. Kiss (Horvath) – 59:37	5–4

14 min
Penalties
6 min
28
Shots
31

24 April 2016; 20:30	Italy	5–2 (1–0, 3–1, 1–1)	South Korea	Pala Odegar, Asiago; Attendance: 1,050

Game reference

Robin Quagliato
Goalies
Kim Tae-kyung
Referee:
(Austria) Stefan Siegel
Linesmen:
(Germany) Lukas Kohlmuller
(Austria) Jakob Schauer

Gios (Berger, Oberrauch) (PP) – 19:38	1–0
Fink (Berger, Oberrauch) (PP) – 24:42	2–0
Fink (Berger, Oberrauch) – 27:22	3–0
	3–1	28:15 – Park M. (Lee H.)
de Francesco (Kasslatter) – 32:09	4–1
Fink (Gios, Berger) (PP) – 40:49	5–1
	5–2	56:02 – Yoon (Chae)

14 min
Penalties
10 min
28
Shots
28

=== Statistics and awards ===
==== Scoring leaders ====
Pos	Player	Country	GP	G	A	Pts	+/−	PIM
1	Vadim Mazur	Ukraine	5	4	7	11	+10	6
2	Andri Denyskin	Ukraine	5	4	5	9	+5	2
2	Patrik Kiss	Hungary	5	4	5	9	+7	4
4	Balint Horvath	Hungary	5	5	3	8	+8	2
4	Donat Szita	Hungary	5	5	3	8	+4	2
6	Jan Drozg	Slovenia	5	3	4	7	–1	2
7	Simon Berger	Italy	5	1	6	7	–2	10
8	Igor Merezhko	Ukraine	5	0	7	7	+7	24
9	Kevin Fink	Italy	5	5	1	6	–2	4
10	Bogdan Stupak	Ukraine	5	4	2	6	+7	14

GP = Games played; G = Goals; A = Assists; Pts = Points; +/− = P Plus–minus; PIM = Penalties In Minutes Source: IIHF.com

==== Goaltending leaders ====
(minimum 40% team's total ice time)

Pos	Player	Country	TOI	SA	GA	GAA	Sv%	SO
1	Martin Szeles	Hungary	151:14	80	5	1.98	93.75	0
2	Ryota Koda	Japan	239:42	91	6	1.50	93.41	1
3	David Mark Kovacs	Hungary	148:46	68	6	2.42	91.18	0
4	Bogdan Dyachennko	Ukraine	299:00	156	14	2.81	91.03	0
5	Ziga Kogovsek	Slovenia	176:47	72	7	2.38	90.28	0

TOI = Time on ice (minutes:seconds); SA = Shots against; GA = Goals against; GAA = Goals against average; Sv% = Save percentage; SO = Shutouts

Source: IIHF.com

==== IIHF best player awards ====
- Goaltender: (Hungary) David Mark Kovacs
- Defenceman: (Japan) Junki Shinoda
- Forward: (Slovenia) Jan Drozg
