= 2019 World Junior Ice Hockey Championships – Division I =

International ice hockey tournament

2019 IIHF U20 World Championship Division I
Tournament details
- Host countries: Germany; Poland
- Venue(s): 2 (in 2 host cities)
- Dates: 9–15 December 2018; 8–14 December 2018
- Teams: 12

The 2019 World Junior Ice Hockey Championship Division I consisted of two tiered groups of six teams each: the second-tier Division I A and the third-tier Division I B. For each tier's tournament, the first-placed team was promoted to a higher division, while the last-placed team was relegated to a lower division.

To be eligible as a junior player in these tournaments, a player couldn't be born earlier than 1999.

== Division I A ==
2019 IIHF U20 World Championship Division I A

Tournament details
- Host country: Germany
- City: Füssen
- Venue(s): 1 (in 1 host city)
- Dates: 9–15 December 2018
- Teams: 6

Tournament statistics
- Games played: 15
- Goals scored: 83 (5.53 per game)
- Attendance: 10,365 (691 per game)
- Scoring leader(s): (Germany) Dominik Bokk (8 points)

Official website
- www.iihf.com

The Division I A tournament was played in Füssen, Germany, from 9 to 15 December 2018.

As a result of the tournament, Germany were promoted to Top Division and France were relegated to Division I B for 2020.

=== Participating teams ===
Team	Qualification
Belarus	placed 10th in Top Division last year and were relegated
Latvia	placed 2nd in Division I A last year
Germany	hosts; placed 3rd in Division I A last year
France	placed 4th in Division I A last year
Austria	placed 5th in Division I A last year
Norway	placed 1st in Division I B last year and were promoted

=== Match officials ===
4 referees and 7 linesmen were selected for the tournament.

Referees

- (Denmark) Thomas Andersen
- (Russia) Denis Naumov
- (Czech Republic) Vladimír Pešina
- (United Kingdom) Liam Sewell

Linesmen

- (France) Thomas Caillot
- (Germany) Gabriel Gaube
- (Denmark) Niklas Knosen
- (Finland) Tommi Niittylä
- (Italy) Ulrich Pardatscher
- (Austria) Elias Seewald
- (Hungary) Dániel Soós

=== Final standings ===
Pos	Team	Pld	W	OTW	OTL	L	GF	GA	GD	Pts	Promotion or relegation
1	Germany (H)	5	4	1	0	0	22	5	+17	14	Promoted to the 2020 Top Division
2	Belarus	5	3	0	0	2	18	13	+5	9	
3	Norway	5	2	1	0	2	15	13	+2	8	
4	Latvia	5	2	0	0	3	11	13	−2	6	
5	Austria	5	1	0	2	2	9	17	−8	5	
6	France	5	1	0	0	4	8	22	−14	3	Relegated to the 2020 Division I B

Source: IIHF
Rules for classification: 1) points; 2) head-to-head points; 3) head-to-head goal difference; 4) head-to-head number of goals scored; 5) result against closest best-ranked team outside tied teams; 6) result against second-best ranked team outside tied teams; 7) seeding before tournament.
(H) Host

=== Match results ===
All times are local (Central European Time – UTC+1).

9 December 2018; 13:00	France	3–1 (1–0, 1–0, 1–1)	Latvia	Füssen Arena; Attendance: 380

Game reference

Gaëtan Richard
Goalies
Niklavs Rauza
Referee:
(Russia) Denis Naumov
Linesmen:
(Austria) Elias Seewald
(Hungary) Dániel Soós

Onno (Mony, Fabre) (PP) – 08:37	1–0
Loizeau (Mony, Onno) – 23:32	2–0
	2–1	57:24 – Smirnovs (Jašunovs) (EA)
Loizeau (Bruche) (ENG) – 58:51	3–1

8 min
Penalties
10 min
18
Shots
34

9 December 2018; 16:30	Austria	2–3 GWS (1–1, 0–1, 1–0) (OT: 0–0) (SO: 0–1)	Germany	Füssen Arena; Attendance: 1,650

Game reference

Paul Mocher
Goalies
Hendrik Hane
Referee:
(Czech Republic) Vladimír Pešina
Linesmen:
(France) Thomas Caillot
(Finland) Tommi Niittylä

	0–1	07:17 – Fischer (Schütz, Seider) (PP)
Lanzinger (Baumgartner, Maier) (PP) – 19:29	1–1
	1–2	28:21 – Seider (Bokk, Appendino)
Schreier – 51:10	2–2

Maxa (miss)
Hochegger
Baumgartner (miss)
Ploner
Würschl (miss)
Shootout
(miss) Gawanke
Brunnhuber
(miss) Jentzsch
Bokk
Ehl
24 min
Penalties
6 min
25
Shots
23

9 December 2018; 20:00	Norway	3–5 (2–0, 1–1, 0–4)	Belarus	Füssen Arena; Attendance: 400

Game reference

Jonas Wikstøl
Goalies
Andrei Grischenko
Referee:
(Denmark) Thomas Andersen
Linesmen:
(Germany) Gabriel Gaube
(Denmark) Niklas Knosen

Solem (Thoresen, Meisingset) (PP) – 08:02	1–0
Solem – 13:23	2–0
Vikingstad (Birkheim, Rødne) – 26:28	3–0
	3–1	39:59 – Drozdov (Martynov, Anosov)
	3–2	42:29 – Sapego (Azhgirei) (PP)
	3–3	46:51 – Baltruk (Azhgirei) (PP)
	3–4	54:25 – Deryabin (Drozdov, Martynov) (PP)
	3–5	59:32 – Anosov (Sushko) (ENG)

10 min
Penalties
10 min
26
Shots
33

10 December 2018; 15:30	Belarus	6–2 (1–0, 1–2, 4–0)	France	Füssen Arena; Attendance: 275

Game reference

Nikita Tolopilo
Goalies
Valentin Duquenne
Referee:
(Russia) Denis Naumov
Linesmen:
(Italy) Ulrich Pardatscher
(Austria) Elias Seewald

Drozdov (PS) – 08:02	1–0
	1–1	36:38 – Bruche (Gallet)
	1–2	39:04 – Sarliève-Fonfraid (Olive)
Oxentyuk (EA) – 39:55	2–2
Protas (Alistrov) – 42:53	3–2
Sapego (Protas, Alistrov) (PP) – 45:52	4–2
Filyayev (Baltruk) – 48:11	5–2
Sushko (Anosov) (SH) – 57:21	6–2

14 min
Penalties
16 min
38
Shots
17

10 December 2018; 19:00	Germany	4–0 (1–0, 2–0, 1–0)	Norway	Füssen Arena; Attendance: 1,030

Game reference

Hendrik Hane
Goalies
Jørgen Hanneborg
Referee:
(United Kingdom) Liam Sewell
Linesmen:
(Denmark) Niklas Knosen
(Hungary) Dániel Soós

Jentzsch (Schütz, Bokk) (PP) – 17:40	1–0
Brunnhuber (Appendino) – 32:03	2–0
Schütz (Bokk, Fischer) – 34:21	3–0
Brunnhuber (Fischer, Seider) – 41:49	4–0

8 min
Penalties
12 min
39
Shots
17

11 December 2018; 19:00	Latvia	4–1 (0–0, 3–0, 1–1)	Austria	Füssen Arena; Attendance: 210

Game reference

Jānis Voris
Goalies
Paul Mocher
Referee:
(Czech Republic) Vladimír Pešina
Linesmen:
(France) Thomas Caillot
(Germany) Gabriel Gaube

Polcs (Ģēģeris, Smirnovs) (PP) – 22:35	1–0
Bērziņš (Melnalksnis, Kārkls) (PP) – 27:37	2–0
Brants (Bērziņš, Jašunovs) (PP) – 35:32	3–0
Vizbelis – 44:33	4–0
	4–1	55:18 – Hochegger (Würschl, Pusnik) (PP2)

14 min
Penalties
8 min
24
Shots
17

12 December 2018; 13:00	Norway	5–0 (0–0, 1–0, 4–0)	France	Füssen Arena; Attendance: 195

Game reference

Jørgen Hanneborg
Goalies
Gaëtan Richard
Referee:
(United Kingdom) Liam Sewell
Linesmen:
(Finland) Tommi Niittylä
(Austria) Elias Seewald

Solem (Pettersen, Thoresen) – 35:04	1–0
Solem (Vaaler, Lilleberg) – 47:12	2–0
Pettersen (Lilleberg, Mathisen) – 51:13	3–0
Marthinsen (Mathisen, Meisingset) (PP) – 58:30	4–0
Lalande (Lilleberg, Paulsen) – 59:07	5–0

10 min
Penalties
20 min
42
Shots
21

12 December 2018; 16:30	Latvia	1–4 (0–1, 0–2, 1–1)	Germany	Füssen Arena; Attendance: 1,095

Game reference

Jānis Voris
Goalies
Hendrik Hane
Referee:
(Russia) Denis Naumov
Linesmen:
(Denmark) Niklas Knosen
(Italy) Ulrich Pardatscher

	0–1	14:25 – Brunnhuber (Gawanke, Wohlgemuth) (PP)
	0–2	32:18 – Appendino (Knobloch)
	0–3	36:21 – Baßler (Valenti, Gawanke)
	0–4	50:29 – Lobach (Seider, Bokk) (PP)
Fjodorovs (Smons) (PP) – 55:36	1–4

12 min
Penalties
16 min
24
Shots
27

12 December 2018; 20:00	Belarus	5–0 (1–0, 1–0, 3–0)	Austria	Füssen Arena; Attendance: 250

Game reference

Andrei Grischenko
Goalies
Florian Vorauer
Referee:
(Denmark) Thomas Andersen
Linesmen:
(Germany) Gabriel Gaube
(Hungary) Dániel Soós

Deryabin (Baltruk, Alistrov) – 12:26	1–0
Alistrov (Protas, Baltruk) (PP) – 23:26	2–0
Martynov (Drozdov, Savritski) – 43:58	3–0
Alistrov (Protas, Baltruk) (PP) – 48:21	4–0
Drozdov (Filyayev) – 58:53	5–0

6 min
Penalties
14 min
27
Shots
16

13 December 2018; 20:00	Germany	5–1 (3–0, 1–1, 1–0)	Belarus	Füssen Arena; Attendance: 1,700

Game reference

Hendrik Hane
Goalies
Andrei Grischenko
Nikita Tolopilo
Referee:
(United Kingdom) Liam Sewell
Linesmen:
(Finland) Tommi Niittylä
(Italy) Ulrich Pardatscher

Schütz (Lobach, Bokk) (PP) – 07:16	1–0
Baßler (Brunnhuber, Wohlgemuth) – 10:50	2–0
Wohlgemuth (Hüttl) – 11:54	3–0
	3–1	28:01 – Drozdov (Sushko, Yeryomenko) (PP)
Valenti (Fischer, Seider) – 31:52	4–1
Bokk (Ehl) – 56:33	5–1

8 min
Penalties
12 min
24
Shots
16

14 December 2018; 13:00	Latvia	2–4 (1–1, 1–1, 0–2)	Norway	Füssen Arena; Attendance: 275

Game reference

Jānis Voris
Goalies
Jørgen Hanneborg
Referee:
(Denmark) Thomas Andersen
Linesmen:
(France) Thomas Caillot
(Italy) Ulrich Pardatscher

Jašunovs (Krollis) – 03:54	1–0
	1–1	06:06 – Pettersen (Meisingset, Mathisen) (PP)
Jašunovs (Smirnovs) – 29:14	2–1
	2–2	38:00 – Marthinsen (Mathisen, Pettersen)
	2–3	52:09 – Mathisen (Solem, Vikingstad) (PP)
	2–4	59:39 – Thoresen (SH, ENG)

8 min
Penalties
8 min
42
Shots
23

14 December 2018; 16:30	France	2–4 (2–1, 0–1, 0–2)	Austria	Füssen Arena; Attendance: 275

Game reference

Gaëtan Richard
Goalies
Paul Mocher
Referee:
(Czech Republic) Vladimír Pešina
Linesmen:
(Germany) Gabriel Gaube
(Denmark) Niklas Knosen

Dair (Fabre) (PP) – 09:04	1–0
	1–1	16:14 – Thaler (Mocher, Hochegger)
Olive (Sarlin) – 16:47	2–1
	2–2	30:31 – Lanzinger (Pusnik, Wallenta) (PP)
	2–3	46:35 – Frowis (Würschl, Baumgartner)
	2–4	58:19 – Hochegger (Würschl, Baumgartner)

10 min
Penalties
4 min
21
Shots
32

15 December 2018; 13:00	Austria	2–3 OT (2–2, 0–0, 0–0) (OT: 0–1)	Norway	Füssen Arena; Attendance: 310

Game reference

Paul Mocher
Goalies
Jonas Wikstøl
Referee:
(United Kingdom) Liam Sewell
Linesmen:
(Germany) Gabriel Gaube
(Finland) Tommi Niittylä

	0–1	02:05 – Thoresen (Birkheim, Edvardsen) (PP)
Ploner (Maxa, Maier) – 09:41	1–1
	1–2	17:02 – Rødne (Mathisen, Pettersen)
Pusnik, Wallenta, Lanzinger) – 17:40	2–2
	2–3	64:18 – Pettersen (Solem, Rødne)

10 min
Penalties
8 min
25
Shots
28

15 December 2018; 16:30	Germany	6–1 (1–0, 2–1, 3–0)	France	Füssen Arena; Attendance: 2,000

Game reference

Hendrik Hane
Goalies
Gaëtan Richard
Referee:
(Russia) Denis Naumov
Linesmen:
(Austria) Elias Seewald
(Hungary) Dániel Soós

Valenti (Gawanke, Wohlgemuth) (PP) – 07:28	1–0
Appendino (Baßler, Seider) – 25:16	2–0
	2–1	33:06 – Plagnat (Schmitt, Bruche) (PP)
Jentzsch (Appendino, Schütz) – 33:49	3–1
Jentzsch (Schütz, Bokk) – 42:29	4–1
Jentzsch (Schütz, Bokk) – 51:37	5–1
Lobach (Seider, Streu) – 56:56	6–1

28 min
Penalties
14 min
43
Shots
16

15 December 2018; 20:00	Belarus	1–3 (0–1, 0–1, 1–1)	Latvia	Füssen Arena; Attendance: 320

Game reference

Nikita Tolopilo
Goalies
Jānis Voris
Referee:
(Czech Republic) Vladimír Pešina
Linesmen:
(France) Thomas Caillot
(Denmark) Nicklas Knosen

	0–1	10:43 – Bērziņš (Jašunovs) (PP)
	0–2	36:43 – Krollis (Ģēģeris)
Protas (Drozdov, Alistrov) (PP) – 43:15	1–2
	1–3	49:48 – Jašunovs (Melnalksnis, Bergmanis)

8 min
Penalties
8 min
24
Shots
27

=== Statistics ===
==== Top 10 scorers ====
Pos	Player	Country	GP	G	A	Pts	+/–	PIM
1	Dominik Bokk	Germany	5	1	7	8	+6	0
2	Ivan Drozdov	Belarus	5	4	3	7	–1	0
3	Justin Schütz	Germany	5	2	5	7	+5	10
4	Moritz Seider	Germany	5	1	6	7	+8	4
5	Samuel Solem	Norway	5	4	2	6	+2	6
6	Mathias Emilio Pettersen	Norway	4	3	3	6	+4	2
7	Viktors Jašunovs	Latvia	5	3	3	6	+3	2
8	Vladimir Alistrov	Belarus	5	2	4	6	–1	4
9	Robin Mathisen	Norway	5	1	5	6	+3	2
10	Nicolas Appendino	Germany	5	2	3	5	+8	4
10	Alexei Protas	Belarus	5	2	3	5	–1	0

GP = Games played; G = Goals; A = Assists; Pts = Points; +/− = Plus–minus; PIM = Penalties In Minutes
Source: IIHF.com

==== Goaltending leaders ====
(minimum 40% team's total ice time)

Pos	Player	Country	TOI	GA	Sv%	GAA	SO
1	Hendrik Hane	Germany	305:00	5	94.90	0.98	1
2	Jørgen Hanneborg	Norway	180:00	6	94.12	2.00	1
3	Jānis Voris	Latvia	238:40	9	89.89	2.26	0
4	Jonas Wikstøl	Norway	123:00	6	89.47	2.93	0
5	Gaëtan Richard	France	239:04	16	89.40	4.02	0

TOI = Time on ice (minutes:seconds); GA = Goals against; GAA = Goals against average; Sv% = Save percentage; SO = Shutouts
Source: IIHF.com

==== Best Players Selected by the Directorate ====
- Goaltender: (Germany) Hendrik Hane
- Defenceman: (Germany) Moritz Seider
- Forward: (Belarus) Ivan Drozdov

== Division I B ==
2019 IIHF U20 World Championship Division I B

Tournament details
- Host country: Poland
- City: Tychy
- Venue(s): 1 (in 1 host city)
- Dates: 8–14 December 2018
- Teams: 6

Tournament statistics
- Games played: 15
- Goals scored: 101 (6.73 per game)
- Attendance: 7,515 (501 per game)
- Scoring leader(s): (Slovenia) Jan Drozg (12 points)

Official website
- www.iihf.com

The Division I B tournament was played in Tychy, Poland, from 8 to 14 December 2018.

As a result of the tournament, Slovenia were promoted to Division I A and Japan were relegated to Division II A for 2020.

=== Participating teams ===
Team	Qualification
Hungary	placed 6th in Division I A last year and were relegated
Poland	hosts; placed 2nd in Division I B last year
Slovenia	placed 3rd in Division I B last year
Ukraine	placed 4th in Division I B last year
Italy	placed 5th in Division I B last year
Japan	placed 1st in Division II A last year and were promoted

=== Match officials ===
4 referees and 7 linesmen were selected for the tournament.

Referees

- (France) Pierre Dehaen
- (Norway) Christian Persson
- (Estonia) Maksim Toode
- (Belgium) Hub Van Grinsven

Linesmen

- (Germany) Andreas Hofer
- (Belarus) Aleh Kliashcheunikau
- (Kazakhstan) Andrei Korovkin
- (Poland) Paweł Kosidło
- (Poland) Rafał Noworyta
- (Austria) Jakob Schauer
- (Russia) Nikita Vilyugin

=== Final standings ===
Pos	Team	Pld	W	OTW	OTL	L	GF	GA	GD	Pts	Promotion or relegation
1	Slovenia	5	3	2	0	0	21	11	+10	13	Promoted to the 2020 Division I A
2	Poland (H)	5	3	0	1	1	19	15	+4	10 (Note: Hungary 2–4 Poland)	
3	Hungary	5	3	0	1	1	24	15	+9	10	
4	Italy	5	1	1	1	2	10	15	−5	6	
5	Ukraine	5	1	1	0	3	14	20	−6	5	
6	Japan	5	0	0	1	4	13	25	−12	1	Relegated to the 2020 Division II A

Source: IIHF
Rules for classification: 1) points; 2) head-to-head points; 3) head-to-head goal difference; 4) head-to-head number of goals scored; 5) result against closest best-ranked team outside tied teams; 6) result against second-best ranked team outside tied teams; 7) seeding before tournament.
(H) Host

=== Match results ===
All times are local (Central European Time – UTC+1).

8 December 2018; 13:00	Japan	1–3 (0–2, 0–1, 1–0)	Hungary	Winter Stadium, Tychy; Attendance: 152

Game reference

Eiki Sato
Goalies
Dávid Kovács
Referee:
(Estonia) Maksim Toode
Linesmen:
(Kazakhstan) Andrei Korovkin
(Poland) Paweł Kosidło

	0–1	01:44 – Mihály (Császár, A. Péter) (PP)
	0–2	06:58 – Seregély (A. Kovács, Bugár)
	0–3	27:53 – Révész (Vas)
Nakajima (Hanzawa, Aoyama) (PP) – 59:07	1–3

12 min
Penalties
14 min
20
Shots
31

8 December 2018; 16:30	Ukraine	2–4 (1–1, 1–1, 0–2)	Poland	Winter Stadium, Tychy; Attendance: 1,232

Game reference

Artur Ohandzhanyan
Goalies
Sebastian Lipiński
Referee:
(Norway) Christian Persson
Linesmen:
(Germany) Andreas Hofer
(Austria) Jakob Schauer

	0–1	16:37 – Paś (Zygmunt, Bizacki) (PP)
Morozov (Buzoverya) – 16:49	1–1
Mateichenko (Kryvoshapkin) – 24:19	2–1
	2–2	32:18 – Tyczyński (Bizacki, Zygmunt) (PP2)
	2–3	40:39 – Kamiński (Paś)
	2–4	45:21 – Wałęga (Brynkus)

12 min
Penalties
6 min
32
Shots
30

8 December 2018; 20:00	Italy	0–3 (0–1, 0–0, 0–2)	Slovenia	Winter Stadium, Tychy; Attendance: 115

Game reference

Davide Fadani
Goalies
Žiga Kogovšek
Referee:
(France) Pierre Dehaen
Linesmen:
(Belarus) Aleh Kliashcheunikau
(Poland) Rafał Noworyta

0–1	16:53 – Stojan (Svetina, Brus) (PP)
0–2	41:09 – Urukalo (Drozg, Predan) (PP)
0–3	43:29 – Stražišar (Brglez)

18 min
Penalties
22 min
22
Shots
42

9 December 2018; 13:00	Slovenia	5–3 (1–2, 1–0, 3–1)	Japan	Winter Stadium, Tychy; Attendance: 125

Game reference

Val Usnik
Goalies
Eiki Sato
Referee:
(Belgium) Hub Van Grinsven
Linesmen:
(Kazakhstan) Andrei Korovkin
(Poland) Paweł Kosidło

	0–1	05:03 – Nakajima (Hanzawa)
Klofutar (Drozg, Urukalo) (PP) – 15:37	1–1
	1–2	18:10 – Hirota (Ishida, Nakajima) (PP)
Kujavec (Kapel, Sodja) – 20:45	2–2
Drozg (Urukalo, Predan) (PP) – 41:49	3–2
Predan (Drozg) – 55:12	4–2
Predan (Stojan, Drozg) (PP) – 59:45	5–2
	5–3	59:55 – Shimanuki (Nakajima, Yasuda)

24 min
Penalties
16 min
29
Shots
28

9 December 2018; 16:30	Poland	1–3 (0–1, 0–0, 1–2)	Italy	Winter Stadium, Tychy; Attendance: 1,538

Game reference

Sebastian Lipiński
Goalies
Davide Fadani
Referee:
(Estonia) Maksim Toode
Linesmen:
(Belarus) Aleh Kliashcheunikau
(Russia) Nikita Vilyugin

	0–1	17:36 – Demetz (Tomasini, Alverà)
	0–2	49:45 – Pechlaner (Spinell, Berger) (PP)
Paś (Noworyta, Tyczyński) (EA) – 59:32	1–2
	1–3	59:57 – Spinell (Leitner) (ENG)

8 min
Penalties
8 min
29
Shots
23

9 December 2018; 20:00	Hungary	9–3 (1–2, 4–0, 4–1)	Ukraine	Winter Stadium, Tychy; Attendance: 215

Game reference

Dávid Kovács
Goalies
Artur Ohandzhanyan
Referee:
(France) Pierre Dehaen
Linesmen:
(Germany) Andreas Hofer
(Poland) Rafał Noworyta

	0–1	01:12 – Morozov (Buzoverya, Danylenko)
	0–2	03:11 – Peresunko (Kruhlyakov)
Vas (Papp, Mihály) – 11:37	1–2
Császár (Dézsi, Sándor) (PP) – 27:59	2–2
A. Péter (Vértes, Horváth) – 31:16	3–2
Papp (Seregély, Mihály) – 36:03	4–2
D. Péter (Dézsi, Kreisz) – 38:06	5–2
Horváth (A. Péter, Vértes) – 40:52	6–2
Császár (Madácsi) – 42:36	7–2
A. Kovács (A. Péter) – 56:53	8–2
	8–3	57:12 – Peresunko (Kryvoshapkin)
Papp (Mihály, Szalma) – 59:35	9–3

29 min
Penalties
49 min
63
Shots
29

11 December 2018; 13:00	Hungary	6–2 (2–1, 3–1, 1–0)	Italy	Winter Stadium, Tychy; Attendance: 237

Game reference

Martin Szeles
Goalies
Davide Fadani
Referee:
(Belgium) Hub Van Grinsven
Linesmen:
(Poland) Paweł Kosidło
(Austria) Jakob Schauer

Papp (Szalma, Bugár) – 01:00	1–0
	1–1	06:05 – Spinell (Berger, Pechlaner)
Császár (Fejes, Szeles) – 06:59	2–1
Császár (Madácsi, Fejes) – 22:54	3–1
	3–2	23:42 – Berger (Pechlaner)
Horváth (Vértes) – 39:09	4–2
Madácsi (Révész) – 39:16	5–2
Dézsi (A. Péter, Horváth) – 59:27	6–2

20 min
Penalties
4 min
39
Shots
29

11 December 2018; 16:30	Poland	3–4 OT (1–0, 1–1, 1–2) (OT: 0–1)	Slovenia	Winter Stadium, Tychy; Attendance: 1,149

Game reference

Sebastian Lipiński
Goalies
Žiga Kogovšek
Referee:
(France) Pierre Dehaen
Linesmen:
(Belarus) Aleh Kliashcheunikau
(Kazakhstan) Andrei Korovkin

Sołtys (Smal, Wałęga) – 08:48	1–0
	1–1	27:10 – Drozg
Sołtys – 36:54	2–1
	2–2	43:33 – Stojan (Drozg)
	2–3	46:49 – Sodja (Kapel, Svetina) (PP)
Brynkus (Wałęga, Khoperia) – 47:28	3–3
	3–4	64:50 – Drozg (Urukalo, Stojan) (PP)

24 min
Penalties
26 min
26
Shots
36

11 December 2018; 20:00	Japan	2–6 (0–1, 0–1, 2–4)	Ukraine	Winter Stadium, Tychy; Attendance: 107

Game reference

Eiki Sato
Toshiki Nakamura
Goalies
Artur Ohandzhanyan
Referee:
(Norway) Christian Persson
Linesmen:
(Germany) Andreas Hofer
(Russia) Nikita Vilyugin

	0–1	18:36 – Peresunko (Kryvoshapkin)
	0–2	35:02 – Firsov (Peresunko, Sukhonos) (PP)
	0–3	41:17 – Danylenko (Morozov, Kozachuk) (PP)
	0–4	44:02 – Shevchenko (Syrotenko, Serednytsky)
	0–5	48:57 – Morozov (Buzoverya, Danylenko) (PP)
Sakuma (SH) – 53:21	1–5
	1–6	54:05 – Danylenko (Buzoverya)
Sugimoto (Sakuma, Hirota) – 57:53	2–6

10 min
Penalties
4 min
24
Shots
43

12 December 2018; 13:00	Ukraine	2–1 GWS (0–1, 1–0, 0–0) (OT: 0–0) (SO: 1–0)	Italy	Winter Stadium, Tychy; Attendance: 118

Game reference
Artur Ohandzhanyan	Goalies	Davide Fadani	Referee: (Estonia) Maksim Toode; Linesmen: (Poland) Paweł Kosidło (Austria) Jakob Schauer
/ 0–1 / 16:30 – Gios (Berger); Shevchenko – 22:11 / 1–1			Referee: (Estonia) Maksim Toode; Linesmen: (Poland) Paweł Kosidło (Austria) Jakob Schauer
Mateichenko (miss); Morozov; Kryvoshapkin (miss); Peresunko	Shootout	(miss) Berger; (miss) Gios; (miss) Deluca; (miss) Tomasini	Referee: (Estonia) Maksim Toode; Linesmen: (Poland) Paweł Kosidło (Austria) Jakob Schauer
20 min	Penalties	6 min	Referee: (Estonia) Maksim Toode; Linesmen: (Poland) Paweł Kosidło (Austria) Jakob Schauer
24	Shots	32	Referee: (Estonia) Maksim Toode; Linesmen: (Poland) Paweł Kosidło (Austria) Jakob Schauer

12 December 2018; 16:30	Poland	7–4 (3–2, 1–1, 3–1)	Japan	Winter Stadium, Tychy; Attendance: 980

Game reference

Sebastian Lipiński
Goalies
Eiki Sato
Referee:
(Belgium) Hub Van Grinsven
Linesmen:
(Germany) Andreas Hofer
(Kazakhstan) Andrei Korovkin

Brynkus (Sołtys, Wałęga) – 01:09	1–0
Paś – 01:29	2–0
	2–1	05:19 – Kobayashi (Sakuma)
Kamiński (Paś, Zygmunt) – 05:53	3–1
	3–2	13:51 – Hanzawa (Takai, Miura)
Bizacki (Smal, Worwa) – 26:15	4–2
	4–3	35:27 – Hanzawa (Hirota, Kimura)
Wałęga (Bizacki, Sołtys) – 44:26	5–3
Tyczyński (Paś) (PP) – 50:29	6–3
Kamiński (Zygmunt) (ENG) – 56:59	7–3
	7–4	59:38 – Sugimoto

6 min
Penalties
10 min
32
Shots
25

12 December 2018; 20:00	Slovenia	5–4 GWS (1–2, 0–2, 3–0) (OT: 0–0) (SO: 1–0)	Hungary	Winter Stadium, Tychy; Attendance: 184

Game reference

Žiga Kogovšek
Goalies
Dávid Kovács
Referee:
(Norway) Christian Persson
Linesmen:
(Poland) Rafał Noworyta
(Russia) Nikita Vilyugin

	0–1	05:12 – Madácsi (Császár, Fejes)
	0–2	07:33 – Papp (Szalma)
Drozg (Svetina, Brus) (PP) – 12:59	1–2
	1–3	28:23 – Császár (Szalma, Mihály)
	1–4	34:47 – Papp (A. Kovács)
Predan (Drozg) (PP) – 47:23	2–4
Kapel (Sodja, Brus) – 50:25	3–4
Sodja (Klofutar, Drozg) – 53:49	4–4

Predan
Drozg (miss)
Tavčar (miss)
Svetina (miss)
Kapel (miss)
Predan
Shootout
Császár
(miss) Papp
(miss) Horváth
(miss) Mihály
(miss) Vértes
(miss) Császár
6 min
Penalties
22 min
34
Shots
31

14 December 2018; 13:00	Slovenia	4–1 (0–0, 2–1, 2–0)	Ukraine	Winter Stadium, Tychy; Attendance: 128

Game reference

Žiga Kogovšek
Goalies
Artur Ohandzhanyan
Referee:
(Estonia) Maksim Toode
Linesmen:
(Belarus) Aleh Kliashcheunikau
(Austria) Jakob Schauer

	0–1	29:19 – Shevchenko (Serednytsky, Syrotenko)
Predan (Kujavec, Drozg) – 30:23	1–1
Šturm (Stojan) – 30:50	2–1
Sodja (Stojan, Kapel) (PP) – 50:04	3–1
Bohinc (Šturm, Stojan) – 57:26	4–1

31 min
Penalties
10 min
44
Shots
26

14 December 2018; 16:30	Hungary	2–4 (0–1, 1–3, 1–0)	Poland	Winter Stadium, Tychy; Attendance: 1,120

Game reference

Dávid Kovács
Goalies
Sebastian Lipiński
Referee:
(France) Pierre Dehaen
Linesmen:
(Kazakhstan) Andrei Korovkin
(Russia) Nikita Vilyugin

	0–1	02:53 – Sołtys (Paś, Libik)
	0–2	24:14 – Olszewski (Wysocki)
	0–3	33:41 – Brynkus (Obłoński)
	0–4	37:39 – Smal (Olszewski)
Horváth (A. Péter) – 38:44	1–4
Papp (Horváth) (PP) – 41:26	2–4

43 min
Penalties
49 min
40
Shots
31

14 December 2018; 20:00	Italy	4–3 OT (1–3, 0–0, 2–0) (OT: 1–0)	Japan	Winter Stadium, Tychy; Attendance: 115

Game reference

Davide Fadani
Goalies
Toshiki Nakamura
Referee:
(Norway) Christian Persson
Linesmen:
(Germany) Andreas Hofer
(Poland) Rafał Noworyta

	0–1	02:24 – Kobayashi (Nakajima) (PP)
	0–2	05:30 – Takai (Kobayashi, Nakajima)
	0–3	09:35 – Aoyama (Kobayashi, Yoneyama) (PP)
Schiavone (Alvera) – 19:01	1–3
Luisetti (Spornberger) – 41:11	2–3
Deluca (SH) – 45:42	3–3
Spornberger (Berger) – 60:30	4–3

22 min
Penalties
6 min
27
Shots
24

=== Statistics ===
==== Top 10 scorers ====
Pos	Player	Country	GP	G	A	Pts	+/–	PIM
1	Jan Drozg	Slovenia	5	4	8	12	+3	14
2	Kristóf Papp	Hungary	5	6	1	7	+2	2
3	Hunor Császár	Hungary	5	5	2	7	+5	12
4	Dominik Paś	Poland	5	3	4	7	+5	14
5	Necj Stojan	Slovenia	5	2	5	7	+2	6
6	Aljaž Predan	Slovenia	5	4	2	6	+2	4
7	Bálint Horváth	Hungary	5	3	3	6	+4	4
8	Teruto Nakajima	Japan	5	2	4	6	–3	4
9	Andor Péter	Hungary	5	1	5	6	+8	2
10	Jaka Sodja	Slovenia	5	3	2	5	0	12
10	Jan Sołtys	Poland	5	3	2	5	+5	25

GP = Games played; G = Goals; A = Assists; Pts = Points; +/− = Plus–minus; PIM = Penalties In Minutes
Source: IIHF.com

==== Goaltending leaders ====
(minimum 40% team's total ice time)

Pos	Player	Country	TOI	GA	Sv%	GAA	SO
1	Žiga Kogovšek	Slovenia	249:50	8	92.38	1.92	1
2	Davide Fadani	Italy	305:30	14	91.08	2.75	0
3	Sebastian Lipiński	Poland	303:44	14	90.97	2.77	0
4	Artur Ohandzhanyan	Ukraine	284:58	16	90.64	3.37	0
5	Dávid Kovács	Hungary	243:48	12	89.38	2.95	0

TOI = Time on ice (minutes:seconds); GA = Goals against; GAA = Goals against average; Sv% = Save percentage; SO = Shutouts
Source: IIHF.com

==== Best Players Selected by the Directorate ====
- Goaltender: (Italy) Davide Fadani
- Defenceman: (Poland) Olaf Bizacki
- Forward: (Slovenia) Jan Drozg
