= 2017 IIHF World U18 Championship Division I =

2017 IIHF U18 World Championship Division I

Tournament details
- Host country: Slovenia
- Venue: 1 (in 1 host city)
- Dates: 7–13 April 2017; 15–21 April 2017
- Teams: 12

The 2017 IIHF U18 World Championship Division I were two international under-18 ice hockey tournaments organised by the International Ice Hockey Federation. The Division I A and Division I B tournaments represent the second and the third tier of the IIHF World U18 Championship. For the 2017 schedule, both tournaments took place at the Bled Ice Hall in Slovenia.

== Division I A ==
2017 IIHF World U18 Championship Division I A
Tournament details
- Host country: Slovenia
- Venue: 1 (in 1 host city)
- Dates: 7–13 April
- Teams: 6

Tournament statistics
- Games played: 15
- Goals scored: 103 (6.87 per game)
- Attendance: 2,830 (189 per game)
- Scoring leader: (Norway) Mathias Emilio Pettersen (12 points)

Official website
- IIHF.com

The Division I A tournament was played in Bled, Slovenia, from 7 to 13 April 2017. As none of the participating countries submitted a bid to host the tournament, Bled was asked to host both the Division IA and IB tournaments.

=== Participants ===
Team	Qualification
Denmark	placed 10th in 2016 Top Division and were relegated
Germany	placed 2nd in 2016 Division I A
Kazakhstan	placed 3rd in 2016 Division I A
France	placed 4th in 2016 Division I A
Norway	placed 5th in 2016 Division I A
Hungary	placed 1st in 2016 Division I B and were promoted

=== Match officials ===
4 referees and 7 linesmen were selected for the tournament.

Referees

- (Italy) Andrea Benvegnu
- (Sweden) Christoffer Holm
- (Poland) Paweł Meszyński
- (Slovenia) Viktor Trilar

Linesmen

- (Slovenia) Anže Bergant
- (Slovenia) Matjaž Hribar
- (Latvia) Raivis Jučers
- (Sweden) Ludvig Lundgren
- (United States) Shaun Morgan
- (Finland) Tommi Niittylä
- (Belarus) Viktor Zinchenko

=== Standings ===
Pos	Team	Pld	W	OTW	OTL	L	GF	GA	GD	Pts	Promotion or relegation
1	France	5	4	0	0	1	17	14	+3	12	Promoted to the 2018 Top Division
2	Kazakhstan	5	3	1	0	1	18	8	+10	11	
3	Denmark	5	3	0	1	1	17	15	+2	10	
4	Norway	5	2	1	0	2	22	13	+9	8	
5	Germany	5	1	0	1	3	23	21	+2	4	
6	Hungary	5	0	0	0	5	6	32	−26	0	Relegated to the 2018 Division I B

Source: IIHF
Rules for classification: 1) points; 2) head-to-head points; 3) head-to-head goal difference; 4) head-to-head number of goals scored; 5) result against closest best-ranked team outside tied teams; 6) result against second-best ranked team outside tied teams; 7) seeding before tournament.

=== Results ===
All times are local. (Central European Summer Time – UTC+2)

7 April 2017; 13:00	France	4–2 (1–2, 1–0, 2–0)	Germany	Bled Ice Hall; Attendance: 140

Game reference

Gaetan Richard
Goalies
Benjamain Beck
Referee:
(Italy) Andrea Benvegnu
Linesmen:
(Finland) Tommi Niittylä
(Belarus) Viktor Zinchenko

Sarlieve-Fonfraid (Rousseau) – 08:14	1–0
	1–1	13:49 – Knobloch (Fischer) (PP)
	1–2	18:23 – Appendino (Schiemenz) (PP)
Loizeau (Koudri) – 33:37	2–2
Gallet (Olive, Texier) – 44:20	3–2
Olive (Texier) – 54:38	4–2

12 min
Penalties
14 min
32
Shots
28

7 April 2017; 16:30	Norway	2–1 (1–0, 1–0, 0–1)	Kazakhstan	Bled Ice Hall; Attendance: 160

Game reference

Jonas Wikstøl
Goalies
Denis Karatayev
Referee:
(Poland) Paweł Meszyński
Linesmen:
(Slovenia) Matjaž Hribar
(Latvia) Raivis Jučers

Pettersen (Ratejczak, Marthinsen) – 09:48	1–0
Pettersen (Meyer, Mathisen) (PP) – 39:12	2–0
	2–1	45:13 – Atakhanov (Muratov, Gatiyatov)

12 min
Penalties
29 min
14
Shots
21

7 April 2017; 20:00	Hungary	1–4 (0–1, 1–2, 0–1)	Denmark	Bled Ice Hall; Attendance: 200

Game reference

Martin Szeles
Goalies
William Rørth
Referee:
(Slovenia) Viktor Trilar
Linesmen:
(Slovenia) Anže Bergant
(Sweden) Ludvig Lundgren

	0–1	09:34 – Setkov (Dietz-Larsen) (PP)
	0–2	21:48 – Philip
	0–3	31:26 –Røndbjerg (Petersen)
Kovács (Kreisz) – 35:22	1–3
	1–4	45:48 – Grundtvig (Madsen, Røndbjerg) (PP)

8 min
Penalties
2 min
14
Shots
39

8 April 2017; 13:00	Germany	5–6 OT (2–2, 1–2, 2–1); OT: (0–1)	Norway	Bled Ice Hall; Attendance: 200

Game reference

Benjamin Beck
Goalies
Jonas Wikstøl
Referee:
(Sweden) Christoffer Holm
Linesmen:
(United States) Shaun Morgan
(Belarus) Viktor Zinchenko

	0–1	02:01 – Marthinsen (Mathisen, Pettersen)
Pietschmann (Gams) – 13:41	1–1
Bappert (Appendino) – 17:47	2–1
	2–2	19:48 – Edvardsen (Meisingset, Solem)
	2–3	26:37 – Marthinsen (Pettersen, Mathisen)
Bokk (Streu, Wohlgemuth) (PP) – 28:55	3–3
	3–4	32:42 – Pettersen (Meyer, Vikingstad) (PP)
Schiemenz (Koziol) – 41:24	4–4
Streu (Bokk) – 49:39	5–4
	5–5	51:32 – Marthinsen (Meyer, Mathisen) (PP)
	5–6	62:20 – Mathisen (Meisingset)

10 min
Penalties
14 min
35
Shots
26

8 April 2017; 16:30	Kazakhstan	2–1 (1–1, 1–0, 0–0)	Hungary	Bled Ice Hall; Attendance: 160

Game reference

Demid Yeremeyev
Goalies
David Mark Kovács
Referee:
(Italy) Andrea Benvegnu
Linesmen:
(Slovenia) Anže Bergant
(Latvia) Raivis Jučers

Vereshagin – 02:51	1–0
	1–1	11:26 – Dézsi (Bugár) (PP)
Shinkaretski (Pavlov, Zhorabek) (PP) – 30:46	2–1

10 min
Penalties
14 min
24
Shots
29

8 April 2017; 20:00	Denmark	2–4 (1–2, 1–0, 0–2)	France	Bled Ice Hall; Attendance: 260

Game reference

Mads Søgaard
Goalies
Gaetan Richard
Referee:
(Poland) Paweł Meszyński
Linesmen:
(Slovenia) Matjaž Hribar
(Finland) Tommi Niittylä

	0–1	05:23 – Sarlin (Berard, Guebey)
D. Andersen (Madsen, Olesen) – 06:55	1–1
	1–2	19:16 – Olive (Gallet, Texier)
Røndbjerg (L. Andersen) – 29:01	2–2
	2–3	58:36 – Texier (Gallet, Sarlin)
	2–4	58:59 – Texier (Sarlin)

6 min
Penalties
10 min
29
Shots
40

10 April 2017; 13:00	Hungary	3–6 (2–3, 1–2, 0–1)	France	Bled Ice Hall; Attendance: 170

Game reference

Martin Szeles
Goalies
Gaetan Richard
Referee:
(Sweden) Christoffer Holm
Linesmen:
(Sweden) Ludvig Lundgren
(United States) Shaun Morgan

Bugar (Lőczi, Horváth) – 02:18	1–0
	1–1	03:36 – Sarlin (Lecomte)
Szigeti – 11:21	2–1
	2–2	14:05 – Loizeau (Lefebvre, Berard)
	2–3	15:25 – Rousseau (Sarliève-Fonfraid)
	2–4	32:16 – Berard (Sarlin, Lecomte)
Kreisz (Mihály) – 35:55	3–4
	3–5	39:33 – Sarlin (Lefebvre, Koudri)
	3–6	59:56 – Gallet (Penz) (ENG)

8 min
Penalties
10 min
40
Shots
35

10 April 2017; 16:30	Denmark	3–2 (2–0, 1–1, 0–1)	Norway	Bled Ice Hall; Attendance: 270

Game reference

Mads Søgaard
Goalies
Jørgen Hanneborg
Referee:
(Slovenia) Viktor Trilar
Linesmen:
(Slovenia) Matjaž Hribar
(Finland) Tommi Niittylä

L. Andersen (Røndbjerg, Grundtvig) (PP) – 07:27	1–0
Røndbjerg (Grundtvig) – 12:28	2–0
	2–1	23:39 – Thoresen (Solem, Edvardsen)
Green (L. Andersen, Wittendorf) – 33:57	3–1
	3–2	56:22 – Mathisen (Marthinsen, Pettersen)

10 min
Penalties
12 min
20
Shots
17

10 April 2017; 20:00	Germany	2–6 (0–1, 0–3, 2–2)	Kazakhstan	Bled Ice Hall; Attendance: 230

Game reference

Mark Arnsperger
Benjamin Beck
Goalies
Demid Yeremeyev
Referee:
(Poland) Paweł Meszyński
Linesmen:
(Latvia) Raivis Jučers
(Belarus) Viktor Zinchenko

	0–1	02:08 – Gatiyatov (Muratov, Atakhanov)
	0–2	22:25 – Demin (Buyalski, Makutski)
	0–3	31:38 – Samat Daniyar (Pryakhin)
	0–4	34:55 – Zhorabek (Pryakhin, Pavlov) (PP)
	0–5	43:18 – Makutski (Buyalski, Neroyev) (SH)
Pietschmann (Ehl, Bappert) – 49:58	1–5
	1–6	50:37 – Muratov (Sayan Daniyar, Vereshagin) (PP)
Bappert (Wohlgemuth) (PP) – 55:47	2–6

8 min
Penalties
12 min
32
Shots
28

11 April 2017; 13:00	Kazakhstan	4–3 OT (1–2, 2–1, 0–0); OT: (1–0)	Denmark	Bled Ice Hall; Attendance: 150

Game reference

Denis Karatayev
Goalies
William Rørth
Referee:
(Sweden) Christoffer Holm
Linesmen:
(United States) Shaun Morgan
(Finland) Tommi Niittylä

	0–1	08:03 – Praem (Grundtvig, L. Andersen) (PP)
	0–2	11:04 – Kragh (Gath, D. Andersen)
Neroyev (Mussabaev, Buyalski) (PP2) – 16:54	1–2
Makutski (Buyalski) (PP) – 23:09	2–2
Muratov (Sayan Daniyar) – 24:57	3–2
	3–3	27:47 – Røndbjerg (L. Andersen) (PP)
Sayan Daniyar (Orekhov, Samat Daniyar) – 62:32	4–3

8 min
Penalties
22 min
28
Shots
18

11 April 2017; 16:30	Germany	10–0 (5–0, 3–0, 2–0)	Hungary	Bled Ice Hall; Attendance: 160

Game reference

Benjamin Beck
Goalies
Martin Szeles
David Mark Kovács
Referee:
(Slovenia) Viktor Trilar
Linesmen:
(Slovenia) Anže Bergant
(Belarus) Viktor Zinchenko

Bokk (Fischer, Bappert) – 05:38	1–0
Fischer (Streu) – 05:48	2–0
Pietschmann (Wohlgemuth, Ehl) – 06:20	3–0
Streu (Fischer, Dersch) – 12:35	4–0
Bokk (Fischer) – 17:48	5–0
Bokk (Schiemenz) – 25:05	6–0
Fischer (Bokk, Schiemenz) – 31:08	7–0
Wohlgemuth (Ehl, Stauffert) – 39:17	8–0
Bokk (Streu, Fischer) – 43:38	9–0
Schiemenz (Bokk, Pietschmann) (PP) – 48:34	10–0

4 min
Penalties
16 min
33
Shots
15

11 April 2017; 20:00	France	3–2 (0–0, 2–1, 1–1)	Norway	Bled Ice Hall; Attendance: 250

Game reference

Gaetan Richard
Goalies
Jonas Wikstøl
Referee:
(Italy) Andrea Benvegnu
Linesmen:
(Latvia) Raivis Jučers
(Sweden) Ludvig Lundgren

Loizeau (Sarlin, Convert) (PP) – 22:02	1–0
	1–1	28:12 – Solem (Hermansen, Thoresen) (PP)
Olive (Rousseau) – 34:13	2–1
	2–2	54:57 – Marthinsen (Pettersen)
Guebey (ENG) – 59:59	3–2

10 min
Penalties
12 min
20
Shots
41

13 April 2017; 13:00	Norway	10–1 (3–0, 4–1, 3–0)	Hungary	Bled Ice Hall; Attendance: 130

Game reference

Jonas Wikstøl
Goalies
Martin Szeles
David Mark Kovács
Referee:
(Poland) Paweł Meszyński
Linesmen:
(Sweden) Ludvig Lundgren
(United States) Shaun Morgan

Hermansen (Billet, Vikingstad) – 01:18	1–0
Vikingstad (Pettersen, Mathisen) (PP) – 05:08	2–0
Meyer (Rekstad, Jenssen) – 09:45	3–0
Marthinsen (Pettersen, Vaaler) – 20:34	4–0
Edvardsen (Thoresen, Meisingset) (PP) – 28:52	5–0
Solem (Edvardsen, Meisingset) (PP) – 33:58	6–0
	6–1	34:12 – Kiss (Nagy, Pokornyi)
Mathisen (Pettersen, Marthinsen) – 36:19	7–1
Mathisen (Pettersen, Vikingstad) (PP) – 47:32	8–1
Pettersen (Meyer, Mathisen) (PP) – 53:29	9–1
Solem (Hermansen, Wikstøl) (SH) – 58:22	10–1

6 min
Penalties
20 min
42
Shots
22

13 April 2017; 16:30	Kazakhstan	5–0 (1–0, 1–0, 3–0)	France	Bled Ice Hall; Attendance: 140

Game reference

Demid Yeremeyev
Goalies
Lucas Mugnier
Referee:
(Slovenia) Viktor Trilar
Linesmen:
(Slovenia) Matjaž Hribar
(Finland) Tommi Niittylä

Orekhov (Makutski) – 19:31	1–0
Pryakhin (Shinkaretski, Vereshagin) (PP) – 28:52	2–0
Sayan Daniyar (Samat Daniyar, Orekhov) – 42:39	3–0
Muratov (Sayan Daniyar, Gatiyatov) – 49:47	4–0
Samat Daniyar (Orekhov, Gatiyatov) – 55:32	5–0

6 min
Penalties
10 min
41
Shots
34

13 April 2017; 20:00	Denmark	5–4 (0–2, 1–1, 4–1)	Germany	Bled Ice Hall; Attendance: 210

Game reference

William Rørth
Goalies
Benjamain Beck
Referee:
(Sweden) Christoffer Holm
Linesmen:
(Slovenia) Anže Bergant
(Latvia) Raivis Jučers

	0–1	04:14 – Koziol (Pietschmann)
	0–2	13:53 – Stauffert (Seider, Fischer) (PP)
	0–3	30:39 – Bokk
Madsen (L. Andersen, Røndbjerg) (PP) – 31:37	1–3
Marcussen (Setkov, Reuter) – 41:55	2–3
	2–4	42:48 – Bokk (Schiemenz, Appendino) (PP)
L. Andersen (D. Andersen, Røndbjerg) – 49:05	3–4
L. Andersen (Rørth) (PP) – 50:46	4–4
Grundtvig (Madsen, Røndbjerg) (PP) – 52:30	5–4

12 min
Penalties
12 min
24
Shots
42

=== Statistics and awards ===
==== Scoring leaders ====
List shows the top skaters sorted by points, then goals.

Pos	Player	Country	GP	G	A	Pts	+/−	PIM	POS
1	Mathias Emilio Pettersen	Norway	5	4	8	12	+5	4	F
2	Dominik Bokk	Germany	5	7	3	10	+4	2	F
3	Robin Mathisen	Norway	5	4	6	10	+6	4	F
4	Jonas Røndbjerg	Denmark	5	4	5	9	–2	2	F
5	Kristian Marthinsen	Norway	5	5	3	8	+5	6	F
6	Lucas Andersen	Denmark	5	3	5	8	–2	4	F
7	Mike Fischer	Germany	5	2	6	8	+6	6	F
8	Hugo Sarlin	France	5	3	4	7	+6	2	F
9	Cedric Schiemenz	Germany	5	2	4	6	–1	2	F
10	Batyrian Muratov	Kazakhstan	5	3	2	5	+7	2	F
10	Max Pietschmann	Germany	5	3	2	5	+2	0	F
10	Samuel Solem	Norway	5	3	2	5	+1	0	F

GP = Games played; G = Goals; A = Assists; Pts = Points; +/− = P Plus–minus; PIM = Penalties in minutes; POS = Position

Source: IIHF.com

==== Leading goaltenders ====
Only the top five goaltenders, based on save percentage, who have played 40% of their team's minutes are included in this list.

Pos	Player	Country	TOI	SA	GA	GAA	Sv%	SO
1	Demid Yeremeyev	Kazakhstan	180:00	95	3	1.00	96.84	1
2	Gaetan Richard	France	240:00	138	9	2.25	93.48	0
3	Jonas Wikstøl	Norway	241:06	96	9	2.24	90.62	0
4	William Rørth	Denmark	182:22	82	9	2.96	89.02	0
5	Denis Karatayev	Kazakhstan	121:45	32	5	2.46	84.38	0

TOI = Time on ice (minutes:seconds); SA = Shots against; GA = Goals against; GAA = Goals against average; Sv% = Save percentage; SO = Shutouts

Source: IIHF.com

==== IIHF best player awards ====
- Goaltender: (Kazakhstan) Demid Yeremeyev
- Defenceman: (Denmark) Daniel Andersen
- Forward: (France) Alexandre Texier

Source: IIHF.com

== Division I B ==
2017 IIHF World U18 Championship Division I B
Tournament details
- Host country: Slovenia
- Venue: 1 (in 1 host city)
- Dates: 15–21 April
- Teams: 6

Tournament statistics
- Games played: 15
- Goals scored: 92 (6.13 per game)
- Attendance: 3,540 (236 per game)
- Scoring leader: (Slovenia) Jan Drozg (13 points)

Official website
- IIHF.com

The Division I B tournament was played in Bled, Slovenia, from 15 to 21 April 2017.

=== Participants ===
Team	Qualification
Austria	placed 6th in 2016 Division I A and were relegated
Japan	placed 2nd in 2016 Division I B
Ukraine	placed 3rd in 2016 Division I B
Slovenia	hosts; placed 4th in 2016 Division I B
Italy	placed 5th in 2016 Division I B
Poland	placed 1st in 2016 Division II A and were promoted

=== Match officials ===
4 referees and 7 linesmen were selected for the tournament.

Referees

- (France) Damian Bliek
- (Norway) Stian Halm
- (Hungary) Miklós Haszonits
- (Kazakhstan) Sergei Sobolev

Linesmen

- (Norway) Knut Einar Bråten
- (Denmark) Andreas Weise Krøyer
- (Slovenia) Gregor Miklič
- (Slovenia) Damir Rakovič
- (Croatia) Marko Šaković
- (Russia) Dmitry Shishlo
- (Hungary) Áron Soltész

=== Standings ===
Pos	Team	Pld	W	OTW	OTL	L	GF	GA	GD	Pts	Promotion or relegation
1	Slovenia (H)	5	4	0	0	1	22	8	+14	12	Promoted to the 2018 Division I A
2	Austria	5	2	2	0	1	14	13	+1	10	
3	Japan	5	1	2	1	1	15	23	−8	8	
4	Italy	5	2	0	1	2	17	17	0	7	
5	Ukraine	5	1	1	1	2	15	15	0	6	
6	Poland	5	0	0	2	3	9	16	−7	2	Relegated to the 2018 Division II A

Source: IIHF
Rules for classification: 1) points; 2) head-to-head points; 3) head-to-head goal difference; 4) head-to-head number of goals scored; 5) result against closest best-ranked team outside tied teams; 6) result against second-best ranked team outside tied teams; 7) seeding before tournament.
(H) Host

=== Results ===
All times are local. (Central European Summer Time – UTC+2)

15 April 2017; 13:00	Italy	2–4 (0–1, 2–0, 0–3)	Ukraine	Bled Ice Hall; Attendance: 100

Game reference

Leo Kostner
Goalies
Mykyta Petlenko
Referee:
(Hungary) Miklós Haszonits
Linesmen:
(Norway) Knut Einar Bråten
(Slovenia) Damir Raković

	0–1	16:43 – Peresunko (Mateichenko, Krivoshapkin)
Glück (Kasslatter, Pföstl) – 22:10	1–1
Forte (Berger, Deluca) – 25:16	2–1
	2–2	43:19 – Firsov (Peresunko, Mateichenko) (PP)
	2–3	48:03 – Danylenko (Lesnikov, Moroz)
	2–4	57:12 – Krivoshapkin (SH)

8 min
Penalties
6 min
34
Shots
32

15 April 2017; 16:30	Slovenia	10–0 (6–0, 1–0, 3–0)	Japan	Bled Ice Hall; Attendance: 400

Game reference

Žiga Kogovšek
Goalies
Kai Tomita
Referee:
(France) Damian Bliek
Linesmen:
(Russia) Dmitry Shishlo
(Hungary) Áron Soltész

Stražišar (Drozg, Kujavec) – 01:01	1–0
Jugovic (Sodja, Drozg) (PP) – 03:06	2–0
Kapel (Sodja, Drozg) (PP) – 05:09	3–0
Stražišar (Drozg) – 09:48	4–0
Šturm (Drozg) (PP2) – 15:24	5–0
Drozg (Kapel) (SH) – 18:31	6–0
Sersen (Brun Rauh, Svetina) (PP) – 25:31	7–0
Drozg (Kapel) (PP) – 43:07	8–0
Drozg (Kujavec) – 45:25	9–0
Kapel – 51:21	10–0

4 min
Penalties
18 min
39
Shots
15

15 April 2017; 20:00	Poland	2–3 OT (0–0, 2–2, 0–0); OT: (0–1)	Austria	Bled Ice Hall; Attendance: 150

Game reference

Oskar Prokop
Goalies
Marvin Kortin
Referee:
(Norway) Stian Halm
Linesmen:
(Denmark) Andreas Weise Krøyer
(Slovenia) Gregor Miklič

	0–1	24:03 – Peskoller (Rossi)
Wysocki (Worwa, Sołtys) – 36:15	1–1
Kiedewicz (Zygmunt) – 36:54	2–1
	2–2	39:18 – Trothan (Maier) (SH)
	2–3	61:54 – Zitz

8 min
Penalties
22 min
19
Shots
38

16 April 2017; 13:00	Ukraine	3–2 OT (0–2, 2–0, 0–0); OT: (1–0)	Poland	Bled Ice Hall; Attendance: 110

Game reference

Mykyta Petlenko
Artur Ohandzhanyan
Goalies
Oskar Prokop
Referee:
(Kazakhstan) Sergei Sobolev
Linesmen:
(Croatia) Marko Šaković
(Russia) Dmitry Shishlo

	0–1	08:17 – Zygmunt (Kiedewicz)
	0–2	09:51 – Duszak (Niedlich)
Stupak (Volobuev, Firsov) (PP) – 24:17	1–2
Moroz (Mateichenko, Horlushko) (PP) – 25:46	2–2
Peresunko – 64:30	3–2

12 min
Penalties
41 min
33
Shots
22

16 April 2017; 16:30	Austria	4–3 (2–1, 0–2, 2–0)	Slovenia	Bled Ice Hall; Attendance: 620

Game reference

Marvin Kortin
Goalies
Žiga Kogovšek
Referee:
(Hungary) Miklós Haszonits
Linesmen:
(Norway) Knut Einar Bråten
(Denmark) Andreas Weise Krøyer

Rossi – 06:57	1–0
	1–1	08:08 – Tišlar (Sodja)
Maier (Gehringer, Zitz) (PP) – 14:54	2–1
	2–2	24:51 – Drozg (Kujavec, Stražišar)
	2–3	39:14 – Kapel (Kujavec, Drozg)
Baumgartner (Schreier) – 43:29	3–3
Rossi (Zitz, Baumgartner) – 53:33	4–3

6 min
Penalties
6 min
33
Shots
25

16 April 2017; 20:00	Japan	5–4 GWS (2–2, 0–0, 2–2); OT: (0–0); SO: (1–0)	Italy	Bled Ice Hall; Attendance: 180

Game reference

Shuto Hatanaka
Goalies
Robin Quagliato
Referee:
(Norway) Stian Halm
Linesmen:
(Slovenia) Gregor Miklič
(Slovenia) Damir Raković

	0–1	02:51 – Berger (SH)
Sakuma (Nakamura, Nagai) – 06:30	1–1
Kume (Kobayashi, Aoyama) – 13:19	2–1
	2–2	17:45 – Deluca (Berger, Defrancesco)
	2–3	43:37 – Kosmac (Kasslatter, Gios) (PP)
	2–4	46:16 – Deluca (Defrancesco)
Aoyama (Kume, Kobayashi) (PP) – 55:13	3–4
Kobori (PS) – 57:01	4–4

Kobori (miss)
Kobayashi
Sugimoto
Sugimoto (miss)
Kobayashi
Shootout
Gluek
Berger
(miss) Kasslatter
(miss) Gluek
(miss) Berger
4 min
Penalties
8 min
44
Shots
21

18 April 2017; 13:00	Japan	5–4 OT (0–2, 2–1, 2–1); OT: (1–0)	Ukraine	Bled Ice Hall; Attendance: 70

Game reference

Kai Tomita
Goalies
Artur Ohandzhanyan
Referee:
(France) Damian Bliek
Linesmen:
(Slovenia) Gregor Miklič
(Hungary) Áron Soltész

	0–1	10:10 – Peresunko (Babchuk, Mateichenko)
	0–2	14:34 – Krivoshapkin (PP)
Kume (Aoyama, Fukuda) (PP) – 24:16	1–2
Sugimoto (Obara, Sakuma) (PP) – 31:41	2–2
	2–3	36:21 – Peresunko (Krivoshapkin)
	2–4	42:00 – Krivoshapkin (Peresunko, Shymansky)
Miura (Sugimoto, Sakuma) – 47:24	3–4
Miura (Aoyama) – 56:29	4–4
Miura (Obara, Kume) – 64:06	5–4

2 min
Penalties
14 min
47
Shots
21

18 April 2017; 16:30	Poland	0–2 (0–1, 0–0, 0–1)	Slovenia	Bled Ice Hall; Attendance: 310

Game reference
Oskar Prokop	Goalies	Žiga Kogovšek	Referee: (Norway) Stian Halm; Linesmen: (Croatia) Marko Šaković (Russia) Dmitry Shishlo
0–1 / 08:21 – Sodja (Drozg, Jugovic); 0–2 / 49:57 – Drozg (Jugovic) (PP)			Referee: (Norway) Stian Halm; Linesmen: (Croatia) Marko Šaković (Russia) Dmitry Shishlo
41 min	Penalties	14 min	Referee: (Norway) Stian Halm; Linesmen: (Croatia) Marko Šaković (Russia) Dmitry Shishlo
21	Shots	43	Referee: (Norway) Stian Halm; Linesmen: (Croatia) Marko Šaković (Russia) Dmitry Shishlo

18 April 2017; 20:00	Austria	2–5 (2–3, 0–2, 0–0)	Italy	Bled Ice Hall; Attendance: 170

Game reference

Marvin Kortin
Alexander Schmidt
Goalies
Robin Quagliato
Referee:
(Kazakhstan) Sergei Sobolev
Linesmen:
(Norway) Knut Einar Bråten
(Slovenia) Damir Raković

	0–1	02:49 – Alvera (Pechlaner, Demetz)
	0–2	15:15 – Spinell (Berger, Deluca)
Zitz (Rossi, Maier) – 16:22	1–2
	1–3	17:48 – Berger (Deluca, Spinell)
Rossi (Vonbun, Zitz) – 18:05	2–3
	2–4	34:55 – Deluca (Defrancesco, Spinell) (PP)
	2–5	36:14 – Kosmac

8 min
Penalties
39 min
35
Shots
17

19 April 2017; 13:00	Japan	3–2 (1–1, 0–0, 2–1)	Poland	Bled Ice Hall; Attendance: 110

Game reference

Shuto Hatanaka
Goalies
Oskar Prokop
Referee:
(Kazakhstan) Sergei Sobolev
Linesmen:
(Denmark) Andreas Weise Krøyer
(Croatia) Marko Šaković

Ishida (Kobayashi, Miura) (PP) – 16:49	1–0
	1–1	19:46 – Jóźwik (Slowakiewicz, Obłoński)
Sakuma (Sugimoto, Obara) – 40:28	2–1
	2–2	48:30 – Obłoński (Slowakiewicz)
Miura (Obara) (PP) – 59:59	3–2

4 min
Penalties
18 min
38
Shots
31

19 April 2017; 16:30	Slovenia	3–1 (1–1, 0–0, 2–0)	Italy	Bled Ice Hall; Attendance: 310

Game reference

Žiga Kogovšek
Goalies
Robin Quagliato
Referee:
(France) Damian Bliek
Linesmen:
(Norway) Knut Einar Bråten
(Russia) Dmitry Shishlo

	0–1	10:24 – Spornberger (Leitner, Deluca) (PP)
Kapel (Sersen) (PP) – 19:59	1–1
Stojan (Drozg) – 48:56	2–1
Šturm (ENG) – 59:32	3–1

4 min
Penalties
10 min
24
Shots
23

19 April 2017; 20:00	Ukraine	1–2 (0–0, 1–1, 0–1)	Austria	Bled Ice Hall; Attendance: 220

Game reference

Mykyta Petlenko
Goalies
Alexander Schmidt
Referee:
(Hungary) Miklós Haszonits
Linesmen:
(Slovenia) Gregor Miklič
(Hungary) Áron Soltész

Morozov (Danylenko) – 20:07	1–0
	1–1	28:04 – Pusnik (Stückler, Wohlfahrt) (PP)
	1–2	40:27 – Rossi (Baumgartner)

4 min
Penalties
10 min
21
Shots
23

21 April 2017; 13:00	Italy	5–3 (2–0, 3–1, 0–2)	Poland	Bled Ice Hall; Attendance: 90

Game reference

Robin Quagliato
Goalies
Oskar Prokop
Paweł Bizub
Referee:
(Norway) Stian Halm
Linesmen:
(Norway) Knut Einar Bråten
(Croatia) Marko Šaković

Deluca – 05:08	1–0
Berger (Spinell) (SH) – 06:35	2–0
Berger (Spinell) – 20:12	3–0
Deluca (Spinell) – 20:38	4–0
	4–1	28:11 – Sołtys (Bizacki, Olszewski)
Kasslatter (Kosmac) (PP) – 31:15	5–1
	5–2	46:09 – Bizacki (PP)
	5–3	50:52 – Obłoński (Wysocki)

24 min
Penalties
6 min
29
Shots
44

21 April 2017; 16:30	Ukraine	3–4 (0–2, 3–1, 0–1)	Slovenia	Bled Ice Hall; Attendance: 520

Game reference

Artur Ohandzhanyan
Mykyta Petlenko
Goalies
Žiga Kogovšek
Referee:
(Hungary) Miklós Haszonits
Linesmen:
(Denmark) Andreas Weise Krøyer
(Russia) Dmitry Shishlo

	0–1	01:16 – Tišlar (Jugovic, Sodja) (PP)
	0–2	01:44 – Šturm (Urukalo, Sersen)
	0–3	21:09 – Kapel (Svetina, Stojan) (PP)
Chorny (Firsov) (PP) – 27:56	1–3
Moroz (Chorny, Shymansky) – 36:12	2–3
Peresunko (Krivoshapkin, Buzoverya) – 36:55	3–3
	3–4	51:17 – Jugovic (Svetina, Urukalo)

10 min
Penalties
4 min
24
Shots
33

21 April 2017; 20:00	Austria	3–2 OT (0–0, 1–0, 1–2); OT: (1–0)	Japan	Bled Ice Hall; Attendance: 180

Game reference

Alexander Schmidt
Goalies
Shuto Hatanaka
Referee:
(France) Damian Bliek
Linesmen:
(Slovenia) Damir Raković
(Hungary) Áron Soltész

Pusnik (Lanzinger, Zitz) (PP) – 29:22	1–0
	1–1	43:03 – Kobori (Kobayashi, Aoyama) (PP)
	1–2	52:04 – Nagai
Rossi (Schreier, Maier) (EA) – 58:26	2–2
Rossi – 62:28	3–2

14 min
Penalties
10 min
36
Shots
36

=== Statistics and awards ===
==== Scoring leaders ====
List shows the top skaters sorted by points, then goals.

Pos	Player	Country	GP	G	A	Pts	+/−	PIM	POS
1	Jan Drozg	Slovenia	5	5	8	13	+7	4	F
2	Stephan Deluca	Italy	5	5	4	9	+4	4	F
3	Marco Rossi	Austria	5	6	2	8	+4	4	F
4	Rok Kapel	Slovenia	5	5	2	7	+4	0	F
4	Olexander Peresunko	Ukraine	5	5	2	7	+5	2	F
6	Simon Berger	Italy	5	4	3	7	+6	6	F
7	Hlib Krivoshapkin	Ukraine	5	3	3	6	+2	2	F
8	Marcel Zitz	Austria	5	2	4	6	+2	4	F
9	Stefan Spinell	Italy	5	1	5	6	+7	2	F
10	Daiki Miura	Japan	5	3	2	5	−1	6	D

GP = Games played; G = Goals; A = Assists; Pts = Points; +/− = P Plus–minus; PIM = Penalties in minutes; POS = Position

Source: IIHF.com

==== Leading goaltenders ====
Only the top five goaltenders, based on save percentage, who have played 40% of their team's minutes are included in this list.

Pos	Player	Country	TOI	SA	GA	GAA	Sv%	SO
1	Žiga Kogovšek	Slovenia	298:21	116	8	1.61	93.10	2
2	Alexander Schmidt	Austria	162:23	66	5	1.85	92.42	0
3	Robin Quagliato	Italy	244:25	146	12	2.95	91.78	0
4	Mykyta Petlenko	Ukraine	195:47	97	8	2.45	91.75	0
5	Oskar Prokop	Poland	265:48	166	14	3.16	91.57	0

TOI = Time on ice (minutes:seconds); SA = Shots against; GA = Goals against; GAA = Goals against average; Sv% = Save percentage; SO = Shutouts

Source: IIHF.com

==== IIHF best player awards ====
- Goaltender: (Slovenia) Žiga Kogovšek
- Defenceman: (Japan) Daiki Miura
- Forward: (Slovenia) Jan Drozg

Source: IIHF.com
