= Jan Drozg =

Slovenian ice hockey player (born 1999)

- Born: 1 April 1999 (age 27) Maribor, Slovenia
- Height: 184 cm (6 ft 0 in)
- Weight: 80 kg (176 lb; 12 st 8 lb)
- Position: Forward
- Shoots: Right
- ICEHL team Former teams: EC KAC; HDK Maribor; WBS Penguins; Grand Rapids Griffins; Amur Khabarovsk; Kunlun Red Star; HK Olimpija
- National team: Slovenia
- NHL draft: 152nd overall, 2017; Pittsburgh Penguins
- Playing career: 2018–present

Jan Drozg (born 1 April 1999) is a Slovenian professional ice hockey player who is a forward for EC KAC of the ICE Hockey League (ICEHL).

== Playing career ==
Drozg was selected by the Pittsburgh Penguins in the 2017 NHL entry draft.

He signed a three-year entry-level contract with the Penguins in March 2019.

In October 2020, he was loaned to HK Olimpija of the Alps Hockey League until training camps in North America opened, after which he re-joined the WBS Penguins.

In March 2022, Drozg was loaned to the Grand Rapids Griffins.

In October 2022, he signed with Amur Khabarovsk.

In November 2024, he was traded to Kunlun Red Star.

In December 2025, Drozg signed with HK Olimpija of the ICE Hockey League.

== International play ==
In 2015, a 15-year-old Drozg helped the Slovenia under-18 national team to a silver medal at the 2015 IIHF U18 World Junior Championship Division I B. The next year, he was named the tournament's best forward as Slovenia finished 4th at the 2016 IIHF U18 World Junior Championship Division I B. In his final year of eligibility for the tournament, Drozg earned best forward honours once again, leading the tournament in points and earning a gold medal at the 2017 IIHF U18 World Junior Championship Division I B.

The same year, 17-year-old Drozg debuted with the Slovenia men's national junior ice hockey team, earning bronze at the 2017 IIHF World Junior Ice Hockey Championships Division I B. Drozg played for the team the next year as well, earning bronze at the 2018 IIHF World Junior Ice Hockey Championship Division I B. At the 2019 IIHF World Junior Ice Hockey Championships Division I, Drozg led the team to gold, and was named the tournament's best forward after leading the tournament in points.

Drozg made his debut for the Slovenia men's national ice hockey team at the 2018 IIHF World Championship Division I A and tied for the tournament lead in points the next year at the 2019 IIHF World Championship Division I A. He earned silver at the 2024 IIHF World Championship Division I A.

Drozg represented the Slovenia national team at the 2023 IIHF World Championship and the 2025 IIHF World Championship.

== Career statistics ==
=== Regular season and playoffs ===
			Regular season					Playoffs
Season	Team	League	GP	G	A	Pts	PIM	GP	G	A	Pts	PIM
2013–14	HDK Maribor U18	EBJL	25	20	11	31	46	—	—	—	—	—
2014–15	HDK Maribor	Slovenia	11	4	3	7	6	—	—	—	—	—
2014–15	HK Celje U18	EBJL	25	47	31	78	37	3	3	2	5	0
2015–16	Leksands IF J18	J18 Elit	22	16	15	31	16	—	—	—	—	—
2015–16	Leksands IF J18	J18 Allsvenskan	16	10	10	20	10	5	0	1	1	0
2015–16	Leksands IF J20	J20 SuperElit	1	0	0	0	2	—	—	—	—	—
2016–17	Leksands IF J18	J18 Elit	18	12	16	28	8	—	—	—	—	—
2016–17	Leksands IF J18	J18 Allsvenskan	17	7	14	21	10	4	1	2	3	8
2016–17	Leksands IF J20	J20 SuperElit	4	3	2	5	0	2	1	0	1	0
2017–18	Shawinigan Cataractes	QMJHL	61	16	34	50	44	—	—	—	—	—
2017–18	Wilkes-Barre/Scranton Penguins	AHL	1	0	1	1	0	—	—	—	—	—
2018–19	Shawinigan Cataractes	QMJHL	60	21	41	62	48	6	4	2	6	8
2018–19	Wilkes-Barre/Scranton Penguins	AHL	2	0	0	0	2	—	—	—	—	—
2019–20	Wilkes-Barre/Scranton Penguins	AHL	32	5	3	8	12	—	—	—	—	—
2019–20	Wheeling Nailers	ECHL	24	13	10	23	16	—	—	—	—	—
2020–21	HK Olimpija	AlpsHL	10	7	10	17	14	—	—	—	—	—
2020–21	HK Olimpija	Slovenia	6	9	2	11	37	—	—	—	—	—
2020–21	Wilkes-Barre/Scranton Penguins	AHL	30	5	2	7	10	—	—	—	—	—
2021–22	Wilkes-Barre/Scranton Penguins	AHL	23	4	6	10	8	—	—	—	—	—
2021–22	Grand Rapids Griffins	AHL	15	0	1	1	4	—	—	—	—	—
2022–23	Amur Khabarovsk	KHL	40	8	13	21	18	—	—	—	—	—
2023–24	Amur Khabarovsk	KHL	49	9	17	26	22	6	3	2	5	6
2024–25	Amur Khabarovsk	KHL	23	2	4	6	12	—	—	—	—	—
2024–25	Kunlun Red Star	KHL	33	6	12	18	41	—	—	—	—	—
2025–26	HK Olimpija	ICEHL	22	10	10	20	6	9	1	6	7	2
AHL totals			103	14	13	27	36	—	—	—	—	—
KHL totals			145	25	46	71	93	6	3	2	5	6

=== International ===
Year	Team	Event	GP	G	A	Pts	PIM
2015	Slovenia U18	WJC-18 (D1B)	5	4	2	6	0
2016	Slovenia U18	WJC-18 (D1B)	5	3	4	7	2
2017	Slovenia U20	WJC-20 (D1B)	3	1	2	3	2
2017	Slovenia U18	WJC-18 (D1B)	5	5	8	13	4
2018	Slovenia U20	WJC-20 (D1B)	5	5	4	9	10
2018	Slovenia	WC (D1A)	5	1	0	1	2
2019	Slovenia U20	WJC-20 (D1B)	5	4	8	12	14
2019	Slovenia	WC (D1A)	5	5	2	7	4
2021	Slovenia	OGQ	3	1	1	2	8
2023	Slovenia	WC	7	3	0	3	0
2024	Slovenia	WC (D1A)	5	1	1	2	4
2024	Slovenia	OGQ	3	2	1	3	4
2025	Slovenia	WC	7	0	1	1	2
2026	Slovenia	WC	7	3	2	5	2
Junior totals			28	22	28	50	32
Senior totals			42	16	8	24	26
