= Maxim Sushko =

Belarusian ice hockey player

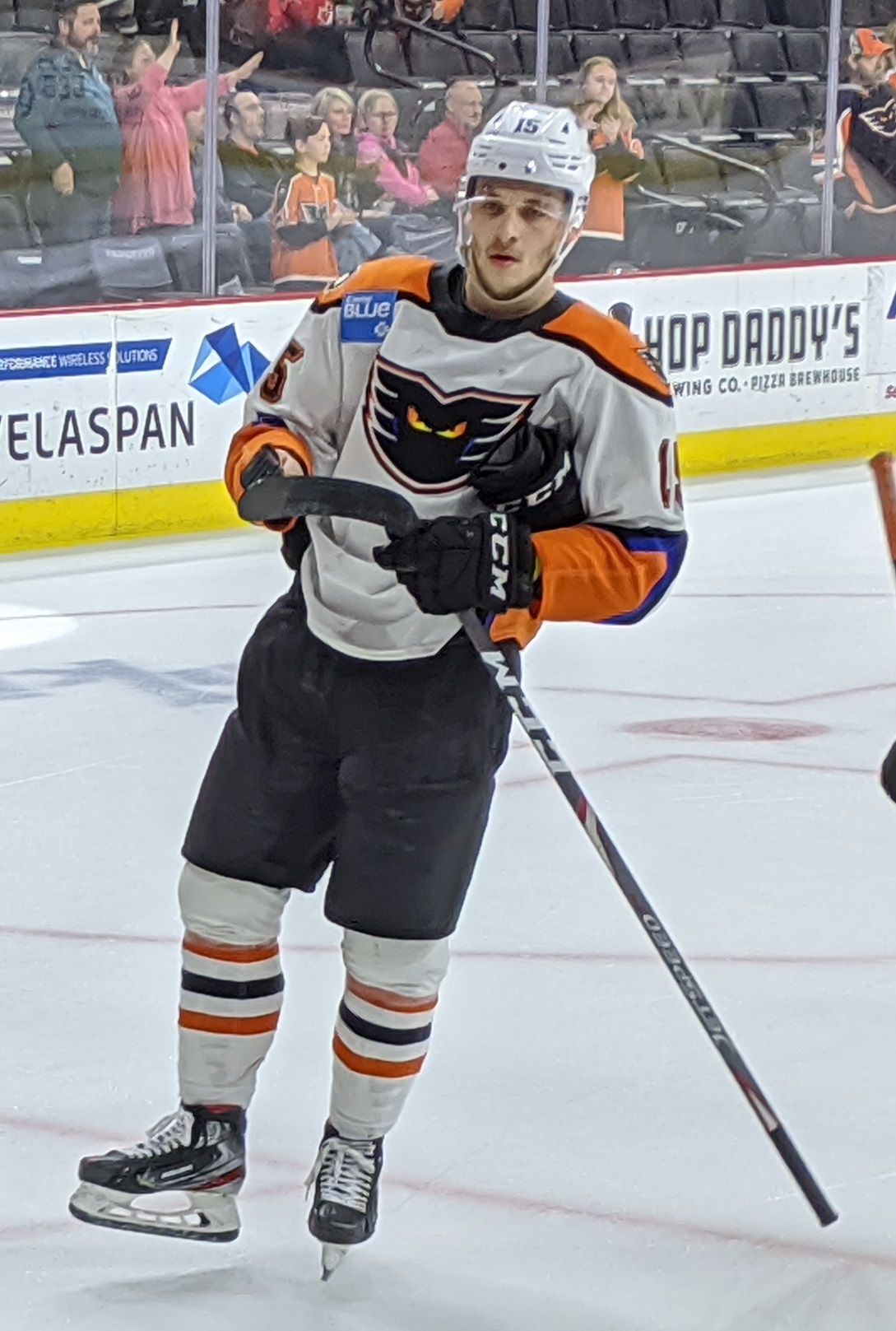
- Sushko with the Lehigh Valley Phantoms in 2020
- Born: 10 February 1999 (age 27) Drahichyn, Brest region, Belarus
- Height: 6 ft 1 in (185 cm)
- Weight: 200 lb (91 kg; 14 st 4 lb)
- Position: Forward
- Shoots: Left
- KHL team Former teams: Sibir Novosibirsk; Dinamo Minsk; Lehigh Valley Phantoms; Philadelphia Flyers; Dynamo Moscow; Neftekhimik Nizhnekamsk
- National team: Belarus
- NHL draft: 107th overall, 2017; Philadelphia Flyers
- Playing career: 2014–present

Maxim Sergeyevich Sushko (Belarusian: Максім Сяргеевіч Сушко; Russian: Максим Сергеевич Сушко; born 10 February 1999) is a Belarusian professional ice hockey forward who is currently playing for Sibir Novosibirsk of the Kontinental Hockey League (KHL). Sushko was selected by the Philadelphia Flyers in the fourth round, 107th overall, of the 2017 NHL entry draft. Internationally he has played for the Belarusian national team at both the junior and senior level.

== Playing career ==
With the 2020–21 NHL season to be delayed due to the COVID-19 pandemic, on 17 July 2020 Sushko opted to return to Belarus and sign with the country's highest ranked professional team, HC Dinamo Minsk of the Kontinental Hockey League on loan from the Flyers, and play until the resumption of the North American season. In 30 contests with Minsk, Sushko added 2 goals and 5 points before returning to the Flyers organization.

On February 18, 2021, Sushko made his NHL debut for the Flyers in a game against the New York Rangers, stepping in as a replacement amid several main roster absences caused by COVID-19 protocols.

Following the conclusion of the 2021–22 season with the Flyers, Sushko, as an impending restricted free agent, opted to halt his NHL career after his KHL rights were dealt from Dinamo Minsk to HC Dynamo Moscow on 20 May 2022. He was immediately signed to a two-year contract with Dynamo to begin in the 2022–23 season. Sushko collected 8 points through 27 regular season games before Dynamo Moscow traded him to Sibir Novosibirsk on 16 December 2022.

Following three seasons with Sibir, Sushko left as a free agent and was signed to a one-year contract with HC Neftekhimik Nizhnekamsk on 26 June 2025. Neftekhimik traded him to Sibir Novosibirsk on 15 December 2025.

== Career statistics ==
=== Regular season and playoffs ===
			Regular season					Playoffs
Season	Team	League	GP	G	A	Pts	PIM	GP	G	A	Pts	PIM
2014–15	Shakhter Soligorsk-2	BEL-2	20	14	16	30	28	8	3	10	13	14
2015–16	Dinamo-Raubichi	BEL-2	8	3	7	10	8	—	—	—	—	—
2015–16	Shakhter Soligorsk-2	BEL-2	21	9	21	30	42	16	3	10	13	18
2016–17	Owen Sound Attack	OHL	54	17	15	32	24	17	3	8	11	10
2017–18	Owen Sound Attack	OHL	60	31	29	60	52	10	2	4	6	6
2018–19	Owen Sound Attack	OHL	62	18	33	51	44	5	2	2	4	9
2019–20	Lehigh Valley Phantoms	AHL	53	11	10	21	32	—	—	—	—	—
2020–21	Dinamo Minsk	KHL	30	2	3	5	20	—	—	—	—	—
2020–21	Lehigh Valley Phantoms	AHL	9	0	0	0	2	—	—	—	—	—
2020–21	Philadelphia Flyers	NHL	2	0	0	0	0	—	—	—	—	—
2021–22	Lehigh Valley Phantoms	AHL	63	10	7	17	31	—	—	—	—	—
2022–23	Dynamo Moscow	KHL	27	4	4	8	12	—	—	—	—	—
2022–23	Sibir Novosibirsk	KHL	24	3	3	6	14	5	0	3	3	2
2023–24	Sibir Novosibirsk	KHL	54	2	1	3	30	—	—	—	—	—
2024–25	Sibir Novosibirsk	KHL	36	2	1	3	6	6	0	0	0	0
2025–26	Neftekhimik Nizhnekamsk	KHL	12	0	2	2	6	—	—	—	—	—
2025–26	Sibir Novosibirsk	KHL	26	2	3	5	6	5	0	0	0	1
KHL totals			209	15	17	32	94	16	0	3	3	4
NHL totals			2	0	0	0	0	—	—	—	—	—

=== International ===
Year	Team	Event	GP	G	A	Pts	PIM
2016	Belarus	U18-IA	5	2	4	6	2
2017	Belarus	WJC-IA	5	1	0	1	0
2018	Belarus	WJC	6	2	6	8	4
2018	Belarus	WC	6	0	1	1	0
2019	Belarus	WJC-IA	4	1	2	3	8
2019	Belarus	WC-IA	5	0	0	0	4
Junior totals			20	6	12	18	14
Senior totals			11	0	1	1	4
