= Justin Addamo =

French ice hockey player (born 1998)

- Born: 27 May 1998 (age 27) Clermont-Ferrand, France
- Height: 1.96 m (6 ft 5 in)
- Weight: 109 kg (240 lb; 17 st 2 lb)
- Position: Forward
- Shoots: Left
- Liiga team Former teams: Mikkelin Jukurit; Wheeling Nailers; WBS Penguins; HC Oceláři Třinec
- National team: France
- NHL draft: Undrafted
- Playing career: 2022–present

Justin Addamo (born 27 May 1998) is a French professional ice hockey player who is a forward for Mikkelin Jukurit of the Liiga. He was a member of the French national team in 2026.

== Career ==
Addamo travelled across the Atlantic to play junior hockey for the Lone Star Brahmas, a rarity for a French national at the time. After helping the Brahmas win a NAHL championship, Addamo joined the program at Robert Morris University in the fall of 2018. Unfortunately, Addamo's time at RMU could not have come at a worse time. After a solid, if unremarkable freshman campaign, Addamo's sophomore year was cut short due to the coronavirus pandemic. The following year, RMU was one of the top team in Atlantic Hockey, despite playing just 21 regular season games (13 fewer than normal). However, despite the team's performance and Addamo's growth as a scoring threat, Robert Morris announced that they were cutting both men's and women's ice hockey from their athletic department in May 2021. While that decision would eventually be reversed, that change would not come soon enough for Addamo's senior season and he transferred to Rensselaer for the 2021–22 season.

His brief time with the Engineers saw Addamo turn into a goal-scoring threat and he finished the season with the second most goals for RPI. While he still had a year of eligibility left at the college level (due to the pandemic), Addamo cashed in on his scoring touch and signed his first professional contract with the Wheeling Nailers. Addamo spent the next two years in the Pittsburgh Penguins organization but had trouble establishing himself at the next level, scoring just 7 goals in 35 games with Wilkes-Barre/Scranton. After 2024, he returned to Europe and joined HC Oceláři Třinec of the Czech Extraliga. The following year, as a member of Mikkelin Jukurit, Addamo was selected as one of the players for the French national team at the 2026 Winter Olympics.

== Career statistics ==
=== Regular season and playoffs ===
			Regular season					Playoffs
Season	Team	League	GP	G	A	Pts	PIM	GP	G	A	Pts	PIM
2016–17	Lone Star Brahmas	NAHL	43	10	10	20	12	1	1	1	0	1
2017–18	Lone Star Brahmas	NAHL	52	15	21	36	10	8	2	2	4	12
2018–19	Robert Morris University	NCAA	39	8	7	15	51	—	—	—	—	—
2019–20	Robert Morris University	NCAA	36	6	13	19	26	—	—	—	—	—
2020–21	Robert Morris University	NCAA	21	8	7	15	53	—	—	—	—	—
2021–22	Rensselaer Polytechnic Institute	NCAA	42	14	5	19	43	—	—	—	—	—
2022–23	Wheeling Nailers	ECHL	42	21	12	33	23	—	—	—	—	—
2022–23	Wilkes-Barre/Scranton Penguins	AHL	14	5	0	5	10	—	—	—	—	—
2023–24	Wilkes-Barre/Scranton Penguins	AHL	21	2	2	4	4	—	—	—	—	—
2023–24	Wheeling Nailers	ECHL	35	13	21	34	26	9	4	7	11	14
2024–25	HC Oceláři Třinec	Czech	27	4	5	9	8	—	—	—	—	—
2025–26	Jukurit	Liiga	44	6	7	13	32	—	—	—	—	—
AHL totals			35	7	2	9	14	—	—	—	—	—

=== International ===
Year	Team	Event	GP	G	A	Pts	PIM
2015	France U18	WJC18 (Div I)	5	3	0	3	2
2016	France U18	WJC18 (Div I)	5	3	2	5	27
2016	France U20	WJC (Div I)	4	1	0	1	4
2017	France U20	WJC (Div I)	5	0	1	1	6
2018	France U20	WJC (Div I)	5	0	0	0	34
2023	France	WC	7	2	0	2	12
2024	France	WC	5	2	1	3	10
2026	France	OLY	4	0	2	2	0
Junior totals			24	7	3	10	73
Senior totals			16	4	3	7	22
