= Valeri Orekhov =

- Born: 17 July 1999 (age 27) Satbayev, Kazakhstan
- Height: 6 ft 1 in (185 cm)
- Weight: 190 lb (86 kg; 13 st 8 lb)
- Position: Defence
- Shoots: Left
- KHL team Former teams: Metallurg Magnitogorsk; Barys Astana; Admiral Vladivostok
- National team: Kazakhstan
- Playing career: 2017–present

Valeri Eduardovich Orekhov (Russian: Валерий Эдуардович Орехов; born 17 July 1999) is a Kazakhstani professional ice hockey defenceman who is currently playing for Metallurg Magnitogorsk in the Kontinental Hockey League (KHL).

== Playing career ==
Following five seasons in the KHL with Kazakh-based, Barys Nur-Sultan, Orekhov left the club as a free agent to continue in the KHL with Russian club, Metallurg Magnitogorsk, after signing a two-year contract on 23 May 2022.

In the 2022–23 season, Orekhov made 14 appearances on the blueline with Metallurg, going scoreless, before he was loaned to fellow KHL club, Admiral Vladivostok, for the remainder of the season on 22 December 2022.

== Career statistics ==
=== Regular season and playoffs ===
			Regular season					Playoffs
Season	Team	League	GP	G	A	Pts	PIM	GP	G	A	Pts	PIM
2016–17	Snezhnye Barsy Astana	MHL	40	6	9	15	22	—	—	—	—	—
2017–18	Snezhnye Barsy Astana	MHL	21	5	8	13	10	—	—	—	—	—
2017–18	Barys Astana	KHL	36	1	0	1	4	—	—	—	—	—
2018–19	Barys Astana	KHL	41	3	3	6	14	11	0	2	2	0
2018–19	Snezhnye Barsy Astana	MHL	2	1	1	2	0	—	—	—	—	—
2019–20	Barys Nur-Sultan	KHL	43	1	4	5	12	1	0	0	0	0
2019–20	Nomad Nur-Sultan	VHL	7	3	3	6	4	—	—	—	—	—
2020–21	Barys Nur-Sultan	KHL	32	2	8	10	6	1	0	1	1	0
2021–22	Barys Nur-Sultan	KHL	41	1	5	6	16	5	0	1	1	6
2022–23	Metallurg Magnitogorsk	KHL	14	0	0	0	4	—	—	—	—	—
2022–23	Admiral Vladivostok	KHL	25	2	1	3	8	11	0	0	0	0
2023–24	Metallurg Magnitogorsk	KHL	55	3	11	14	18	23	0	3	3	10
2024–25	Metallurg Magnitogorsk	KHL	64	10	17	27	21	6	1	1	2	2
2025–26	Metallurg Magnitogorsk	KHL	60	9	22	31	14	15	2	4	6	2
KHL totals			411	32	71	103	117	73	3	12	15	20

=== International ===
Year	Team	Event	Result	GP	G	A	Pts	PIM
2016	Kazakhstan	U18-I	13th	5	0	2	2	4
2017	Kazakhstan	U18-I	12th	4	1	3	4	27
2017	Kazakhstan	WJC-I	14th	5	1	1	2	8
2018	Kazakhstan	WJC-I	17th	5	1	6	7	2
2018	Kazakhstan	WC-I	19th	5	1	1	2	0
2019	Kazakhstan	WJC	15th	6	0	5	5	2
2019	Kazakhstan	WC-I	17th	4	0	0	0	2
2020	Kazakhstan	OGQ	DNQ	3	2	1	3	0
2021	Kazakhstan	WC	10th	3	0	0	0	0
2022	Kazakhstan	WC	14th	7	3	4	7	2
2023	Kazakhstan	WC	11th	7	2	1	3	2
2024	Kazakhstan	WC	12th	7	1	1	2	0
2024	Kazakhstan	OGQ	DNQ	3	0	0	0	0
2025	Kazakhstan	WC	15th	6	1	2	3	2
Junior totals				25	3	17	20	43
Senior totals				45	10	10	20	8

== Awards and honors ==
Award	Year
KHL
Gagarin Cup (Metallurg Magnitogorsk)	2024
