= Gregorio Gios =

Italian ice hockey player

- Born: 29 June 1999 (age 27) Asiago, Italy
- Height: 1.83 m (6 ft 0 in)
- Weight: 79 kg (174 lb; 12 st 6 lb)
- Position: Defence
- Shoots: Right
- AlpsHL team Former teams: HC Fassa; HC Bozen–Bolzano
- National team: Italy
- NHL draft: Undrafted
- Playing career: 2020–present

Gregorio Gios (born 29 June 1999) is an Italian professional ice hockey player who is a defenceman for HC Fassa of the Alps Hockey League (AlpsHL).

== International play ==
He represented Italy national team at the 2021 IIHF World Championship.

== Career statistics ==
=== Regular season and playoffs ===
			Regular season					Playoffs
Season	Team	League	GP	G	A	Pts	PIM	GP	G	A	Pts	PIM
2017–18	Jokerit U20	U20 SM-liiga	29	0	1	1	8	—	—	—	—	—
2018–19	TUTO Hockey U20	U20 SM-liiga	10	1	2	3	4	—	—	—	—	—
2018–19	New Hampshire Junior Monarchs	NCDC	16	2	3	5	2	2	0	0	0	2
2019–20	South Shore Kings	NCDC	17	0	7	7	16	—	—	—	—	—
2019–20	HC Bolzano	EBEL	3	0	0	0	0	—	—	—	—	—
2020–21	HC Bolzano	ICEHL	24	0	1	1	0	—	—	—	—	—
2020–21	HC Fassa Falcons	AlpsHL	20	1	3	4	26	—	—	—	—	—
2021–22	Asiago	AlpsHL	37	0	8	8	47	11	0	1	1	10
2021–22	Asiago	Italy	3	0	0	0	0	—	—	—	—	—
2022–23	Asiago	ICEHL	48	1	5	6	34	2	0	0	0	0
2023–24	Asiago	ICEHL	37	0	5	5	21	—	—	—	—	—
2024–25	Asiago	ICEHL	26	1	2	3	18	—	—	—	—	—
2024–25	HC Pustertal Wölfe	ICEHL	1	0	0	0	0	8	0	0	0	0
2025–26	Asiago	AlpsHL	41	2	9	11	99	6	0	0	0	8
2025–26	Asiago	Italy	2	0	0	0	2	—	—	—	—	—
ICEHL (EBEL) totals			139	2	13	15	73	10	0	0	0	0

=== International ===
Year	Team	Event	GP	G	A	Pts	PIM
2015	Italy U18	WJC-18 (D1B)	5	0	0	0	6
2016	Italy U20	WJC-20 (D1A)	5	0	0	0	2
2016	Italy U18	WJC-18 (D1B)	5	1	2	3	12
2017	Italy U18	WJC-18 (D1B)	5	0	1	1	27
2018	Italy U20	WJC-20 (D1B)	5	0	2	2	2
2019	Italy U20	WJC-20 (D1B)	5	1	0	1	8
2021	Italy	WC	7	0	0	0	2
2021	Italy	OGQ	1	0	0	0	0
2022	Italy	WC	7	0	0	0	2
2023	Italy	WC (D1A)	5	0	0	0	0
2026	Italy	WC	7	0	0	0	0
Junior totals			30	2	5	7	57
Senior totals			27	0	0	0	4
