= Dominik Bokk =

German ice hockey player (born 2000)

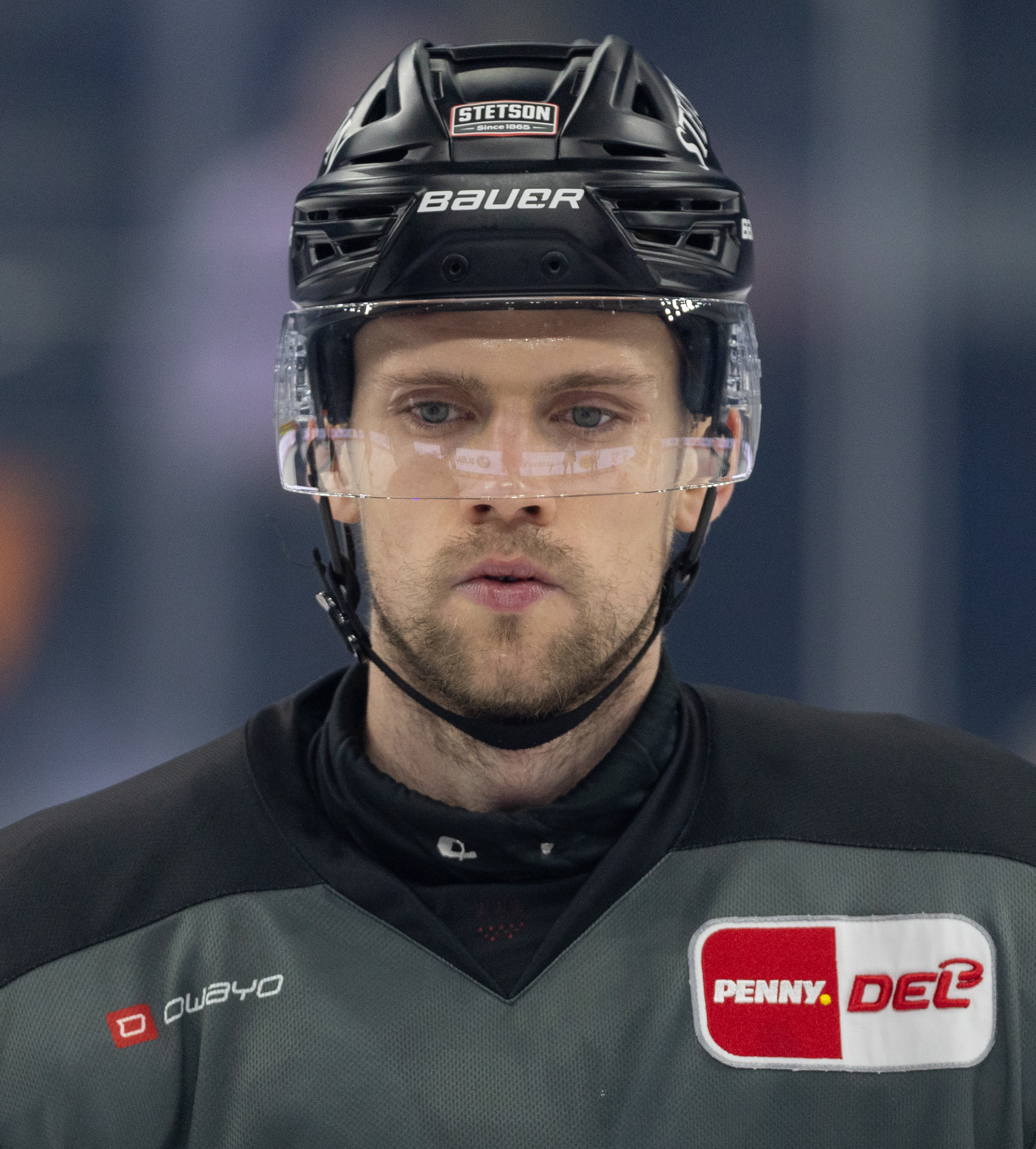
- Bokk with Kölner Haie in 2025
- Born: 3 February 2000 (age 26) Schweinfurt, Germany
- Height: 6 ft 1 in (185 cm)
- Weight: 181 lb (82 kg; 12 st 13 lb)
- Position: Winger
- Shoots: Right
- DEL team Former teams: Kölner Haie: Växjö Lakers; Rögle BK; Djurgårdens IF; Eisbären Berlin; Löwen Frankfurt
- NHL draft: 25th overall, 2018; St. Louis Blues
- Playing career: 2017–present

Dominik Bokk (born 3 February 2000) is a German professional ice hockey forward who currently plays for Kölner Haie of the German Ice Hockey League (DEL). A top prospect going into the 2018 NHL entry draft, Bokk was selected 25th overall by the St. Louis Blues and was traded to the Carolina Hurricanes the following year, but has not played in any NHL games.

Internationally, he has played for the German national team at the 2017 World U18 Championship and the 2018 World Junior Championship, both at the Division I level.

== Playing career ==
Bokk spent time in Germany with the Kölner Haie junior program before moving to Sweden and the Växjö Lakers in 2017. In 2017 he was selected ninth overall by the Prince Albert Raiders in the 2017 CHL Import Draft. Only interested in playing for a team in the Ontario Hockey League, specifically the Windsor Spitfires, Bokk decided against moving to North America and spent the 2017–18 season in the J20 SuperElit, the top junior league in Sweden, finishing with 41 point in 35 games on Växjö's junior affiliate. He also played 15 games for the senior team in the Swedish Hockey League, scoring one goal and one assist.

Regarded as a top draft pick in the 2018 NHL entry draft, Bokk was ranked the twelfth-best European skater by the NHL's Central Scouting Bureau. Bokk was selected by the St. Louis Blues 25th overall. He was then signed to a three-year, entry-level contract with the Blues on 12 July 2018.

On 7 May 2019, after two seasons with the Växjö Lakers, Bokk signed on loan from the St. Louis Blues with fellow SHL club Rögle BK for the 2019–20 season, reuniting with former junior coach Cam Abbott. On 24 September 2019, Bokk was traded, along with Joel Edmundson and a seventh-round pick in 2021, to the Carolina Hurricanes in exchange for Justin Faulk and a fifth-round pick in 2020.

Ending his stint in Sweden, with the Hurricanes and North American seasons set to be delayed due to the COVID-19 pandemic, Bokk remained in Germany loaned by Carolina to join Krefeld Pinguine of the Deutsche Eishockey Liga (DEL) on 12 September 2020. With the league commencement delayed due to the ongoing pandemic, Bokk returned to Sweden and the SHL, agreeing to a loan in joining Djurgårdens IF on 16 October 2020. Bokk made 20 appearances with Djurgårdens in the 2020–21 season, collecting just 3 points, before he was reassigned by the Hurricanes to join primary AHL affiliate, the Chicago Wolves, on 16 January 2021.

In the following 2021–22 season, Bokk remained in North America, assigned by the Hurricanes to continue with the Chicago Wolves. Through 32 regular season games, Bokk compiled 3 goals and 10 points before he was returned by the Hurricanes to continue his development in Germany on loan for the remainder of the season with Eisbären Berlin of the DEL on 24 February 2022. He made 14 appearances to close out the regular season with Eisbären Berlin, collecting 11 points. In the playoffs, Bokk contributed with 2 goals through 12 post-season games to help Eisbären Berlin claim the championship.

Approaching the final season of his entry-level contract, Bokk agreed to remain in Germany, joining newly promoted club, Löwen Frankfurt of the DEL, on loan from the Hurricanes on 13 July 2022. In the 2022–23 season, Bokk found instant success offensively, featuring on Frankfurt's top scoring line alongside Carter Rowney and Brendan Ranford. Emerging as one of the DEL's top-scoring lines, Bokk contributed with 24 goals and 49 points in only 43 regular-season games. On 11 February 2023, Bokk opted to continue his tenure with Löwen Frankfurt, signing a one-year contract extension through 2024.

After three seasons in Frankfurt, Bokk returned to one of his youth clubs on 28 May 2025, signing a two-year contract with Kölner Haie.

== International play ==
Bokk played for Germany in the 2017 IIHF World U18 Championship Division I, where he finished tied for second in scoring with seven goals and three assists. He also played at the 2018 and 2019 World Junior Championships Division IA. At the 2019 tournament, he led Division IA in scoring and helped Germany earn promotion to the 2020 World Junior Championships.

== Career statistics ==
=== Regular season and playoffs ===
			Regular season					Playoffs
Season	Team	League	GP	G	A	Pts	PIM	GP	G	A	Pts	PIM
2014–15	Kölner EC	DNL	0	0	0	0	0	2	0	1	1	0
2015–16	Kölner EC	DNL	32	10	18	28	10	—	—	—	—	—
2016–17	Kölner EC	DNL	41	34	37	71	69	4	5	2	7	4
2017–18	Växjö Lakers	J20	35	14	27	41	12	8	5	6	11	4
2017–18	Växjö Lakers	SHL	15	1	1	2	0	—	—	—	—	—
2018–19	Växjö Lakers	SHL	47	8	15	23	10	6	2	1	3	0
2018–19	Växjö Lakers	J20	1	1	0	1	0	1	0	1	1	0
2019–20	Rögle BK	SHL	45	11	6	17	6	—	—	—	—	—
2020–21	Djurgårdens IF	SHL	20	2	1	3	8	—	—	—	—	—
2020–21	Chicago Wolves	AHL	29	9	9	18	10	—	—	—	—	—
2021–22	Chicago Wolves	AHL	32	3	7	10	8	—	—	—	—	—
2021–22	Eisbären Berlin	DEL	14	3	8	11	4	12	2	1	3	0
2022–23	Löwen Frankfurt	DEL	43	24	25	49	14	1	0	1	1	0
2023–24	Löwen Frankfurt	DEL	52	12	24	36	28	—	—	—	—	—
2024–25	Löwen Frankfurt	DEL	33	13	9	22	18	2	0	0	0	0
2025–26	Kölner Haie	DEL	52	17	23	40	22	10	6	2	8	2
SHL totals			127	22	23	45	24	6	2	1	3	0
DEL totals			194	69	89	158	86	25	8	4	12	2

=== International ===
Year	Team	Event	Result	GP	G	A	Pts	PIM
2017	Germany	U18-D1	15th	5	7	3	10	2
2018	Germany	WJC-D1	13th	5	1	4	5	4
2019	Germany	WJC-D1	11th	5	1	7	8	0
2020	Germany	WJC	9th	7	6	2	8	0
Junior totals				22	15	16	31	6

Awards and achievements
Preceded by Klim Kostin	St. Louis Blues first-round draft pick 2018	Succeeded by Jake Neighbours
