= Fredrik Dahl =

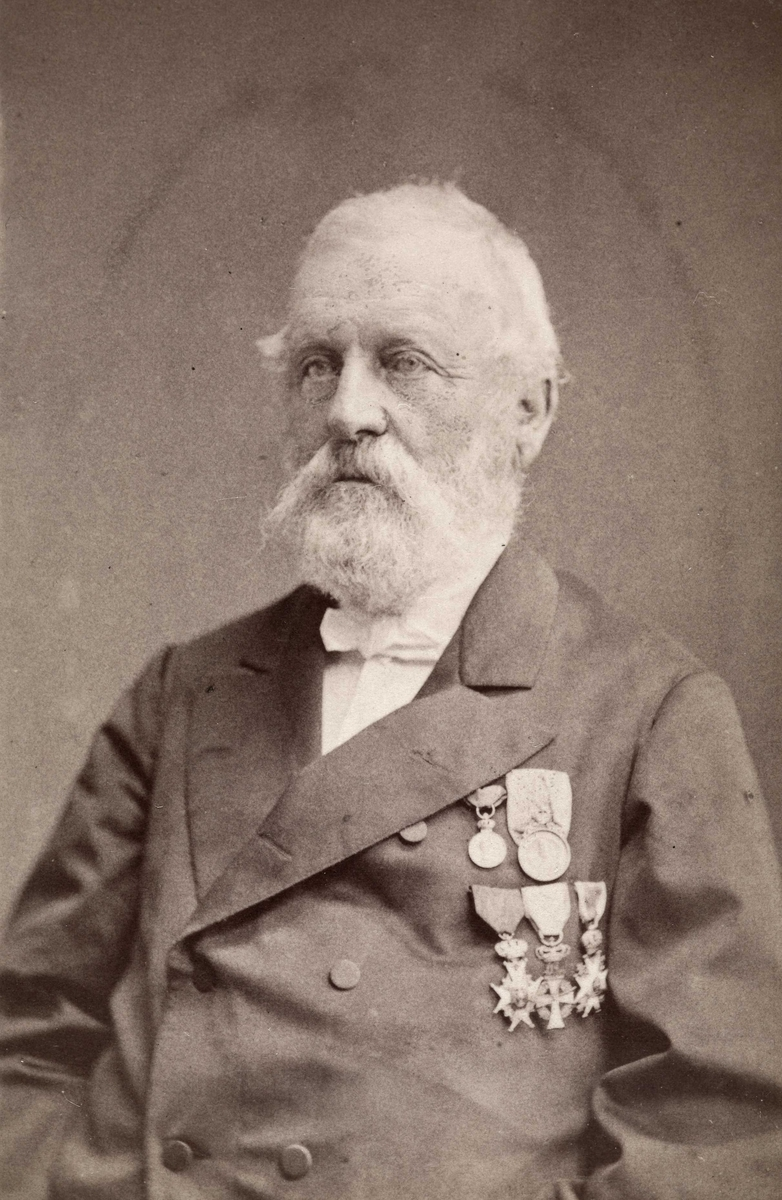

Fredrik August Dahl (23 March 1818 – 29 November 1890) was a Swedish agricultural writer and teacher.

He wrote extensively on agriculture, and was a teacher at Ultuna Agricultural College from 1847. From 1858 to 1880 he was the managing director of the Norwegian College of Agriculture. He remained in Norway after his retirement, dying in November 1890 in Kristiania. He was made a Knight of the Norwegian Order of St. Olav in 1864, Swedish Order of Vasa in 1868 and the Danish Order of the Dannebrog in 1876.
