= Davide Fadani =

Italian ice hockey player (born 2001)

- Born: 3 February 2001 (age 25) Milan, Italy
- Height: 1.82 m (6 ft 0 in)
- Weight: 76 kg (168 lb; 12 st 0 lb)
- Position: Goaltender
- Catches: Left
- NL team (P) Cur. team: HC Ambrì-Piotta; GDT Bellinzona Snakes (SL)
- National team: Italy
- Playing career: 2021–present

Davide Fadani (born 3 February 2001) is an Italian professional ice hockey player who is a goaltender for GDT Bellinzona Snakes of the Swiss League (SL) while under contract to HC Ambrì-Piotta of the National League (NL).

== International play ==
He represented Italy at the 2021 IIHF World Championship.
