= Nikita Boyarkin =

Kazakhstani ice hockey player

- Born: 7 October 1998 (age 27) Karaganda, Kazakhstan
- Height: 1.87 m (6 ft 2 in)
- Weight: 80 kg (176 lb; 12 st 8 lb)
- Position: Goaltender
- Catches: Left
- KHL team Former teams: Admiral Vladivostok; Barys Astana
- National team: Kazakhstan
- Playing career: 2017–present

Nikita Yevgenyevich Boyarkin (Russian: Никита Евгеньевич Бояркин; born 7 October 1998) is a Kazakhstani ice hockey player for Admiral Vladivostok in the Kontinental Hockey League (KHL) and the Kazakhstani national team.

He represented Kazakhstan at the 2021 IIHF World Championship.
