= Sayan Daniyar =

Kazakhstani ice hockey player

- Born: 5 October 1999 (age 27) Astana, Kazakhstan
- Height: 1.80 m (5 ft 11 in)
- Weight: 72 kg (159 lb; 11 st 5 lb)
- Position: Centre
- Shoots: Left
- SHL team Former teams: Saryarka Karaganda; HC Astana; Barys Nur-Sultan
- National team: Kazakhstan
- NHL draft: Undrafted
- Playing career: 2015–present
Medal record
World University Games
| Bronze medal – third place | 2023 Lake Placid | Ice hockey |

Sayan Erlanuly Daniyar (Russian: Саян Ерланулы Данияр; born 5 October 1999) is a Kazakhstani ice hockey player for Saryarka Karaganda and the Kazakhstani national team.

He represented Kazakhstan at the 2021 IIHF World Championship. He represented Kazakhstan at the 2023 Winter World University Games, winning a bronze medal.
