= Leon Gawanke =

German ice hockey player (born 1999)

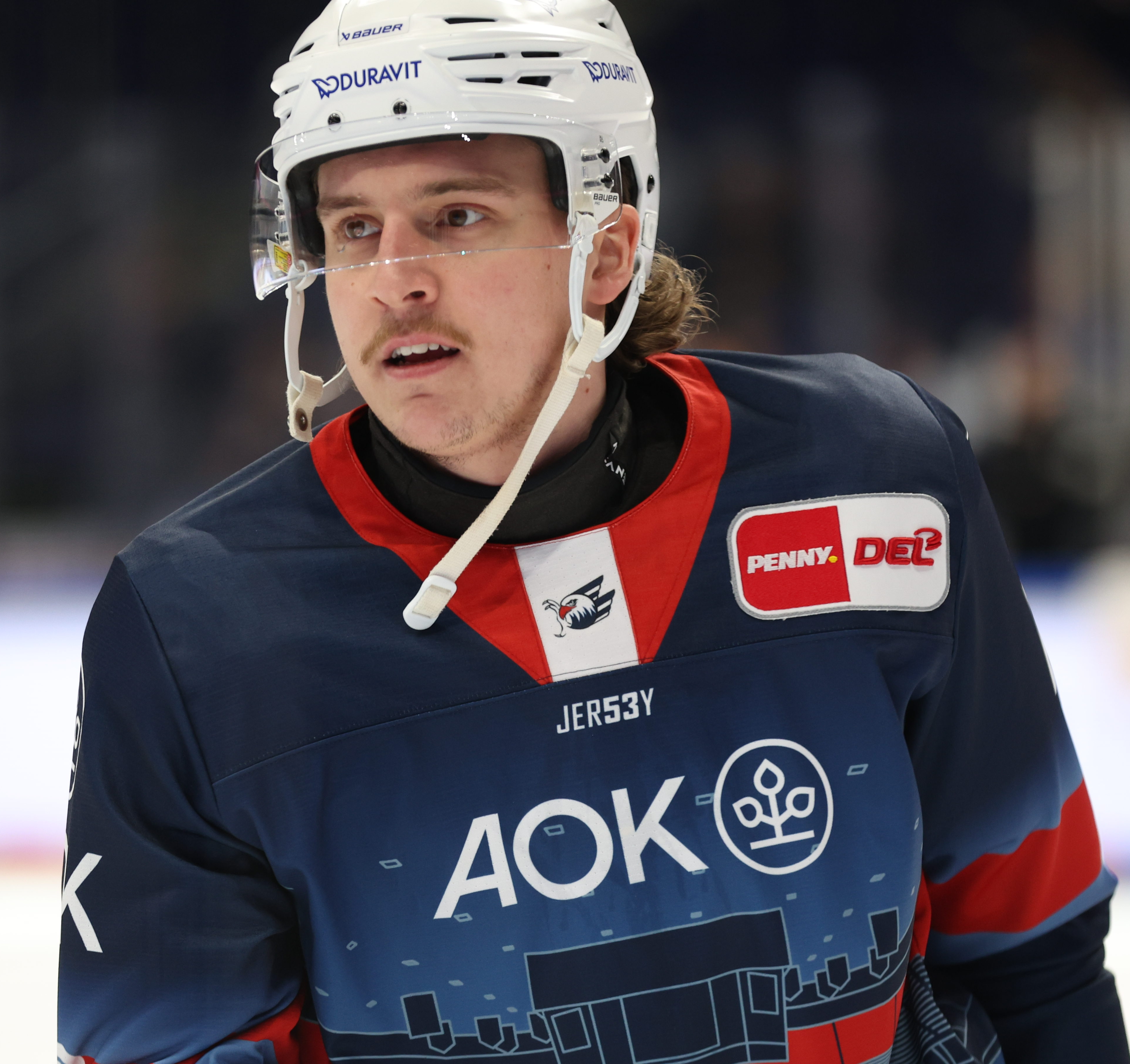
- Leon Gawanke, 2024
- Born: 31 May 1999 (age 27) Berlin, Germany
- Height: 6 ft 2 in (188 cm)
- Weight: 193 lb (88 kg; 13 st 11 lb)
- Position: Defence
- Shoots: Right
- DEL team Former teams: Adler Mannheim; Eisbären Berlin
- National team: Germany
- NHL draft: 136th overall, 2017; Winnipeg Jets
- Playing career: 2019–present

Leon Gawanke (born 31 May 1999) is a German professional ice hockey player who is a defenceman for Adler Mannheim of the Deutsche Eishockey Liga (DEL). He represents the German national team.

== Playing career ==
He was drafted 136th overall in the 2017 NHL entry draft by the Winnipeg Jets and signed an entry-level contract on 23 May 2019.

Gawanke played within the Winnipeg Jets organization for four seasons, featuring exclusively with their American Hockey League (AHL) affiliate, the Manitoba Moose.

As a pending restricted free agent following the 2022–23 season, Gawanke opted to return to Germany in agreeing to a four-year contract with Adler Mannheim of the Deutsche Eishockey Liga (DEL), on 10 May 2023. Two months later, his NHL rights were traded by the Jets to the San Jose Sharks in exchange for Artemi Kniazev. Three days later, he was signed to a one-year, two-way contract by the Sharks. After 38 games in the 2023–24 season with the Sharks' AHL affiliate, the San Jose Barracuda, Gawanke and the organization mutually agreed to terminate his contract on 8 February 2024. After clearing waivers a day later, Gawanke subsequently re-joined Adler Mannheim.

== International play ==
Medal record

Representing Germany

Ice hockey

World Championships
Silver medal – second place	2023 Finland/Latvia	

He represented Germany at the 2021 IIHF World Championship.

== Career statistics ==
=== Regular season and playoffs ===
			Regular season					Playoffs
Season	Team	League	GP	G	A	Pts	PIM	GP	G	A	Pts	PIM
2014–15	Eisbären Juniors Berlin	DNL	2	0	0	0	0	—	—	—	—	—
2015–16	Eisbären Juniors Berlin	DNL	41	11	25	36	18	2	1	3	4	0
2016–17	Cape Breton Screaming Eagles	QMJHL	54	8	24	32	26	11	1	3	4	4
2017–18	Cape Breton Screaming Eagles	QMJHL	62	4	28	32	39	5	1	1	2	5
2018–19	Cape Breton Screaming Eagles	QMJHL	62	17	40	57	26	11	2	5	7	4
2019–20	Manitoba Moose	AHL	48	4	22	26	21	—	—	—	—	—
2020–21	Eisbären Berlin	DEL	6	0	2	2	4	—	—	—	—	—
2020–21	Manitoba Moose	AHL	26	1	6	7	7	—	—	—	—	—
2021–22	Manitoba Moose	AHL	65	10	26	36	19	5	1	3	4	4
2022–23	Manitoba Moose	AHL	68	20	25	45	51	5	0	1	1	6
2023–24	San Jose Barracuda	AHL	38	8	19	27	37	—	—	—	—	—
2023–24	Adler Mannheim	DEL	8	1	9	10	2	7	2	4	6	11
2024–25	Adler Mannheim	DEL	52	8	30	38	40	10	1	1	2	6
2025–26	Adler Mannheim	DEL	49	5	25	30	25	15	2	10	12	12
AHL totals			245	43	98	141	135	10	1	4	5	10
DEL totals			115	14	66	80	71	32	5	15	20	29

=== International ===
Year	Team	Event	Result	GP	G	A	Pts	PIM
2016	Germany	U18 D1	12th	5	0	1	1	0
2017	Germany	WJC D1	12th	4	0	1	1	0
2018	Germany	WJC D1	13th	5	2	3	5	2
2019	Germany	WJC D1	11th	5	0	3	3	2
2021	Germany	WC	4th	10	2	0	2	0
2022	Germany	WC	7th	4	0	1	1	0
2023	Germany	WC	2nd place, silver medalist(s)	8	0	3	3	2
2026	Germany	OG	6th	5	0	0	0	0
2026	Germany	WC	10th	7	4	3	7	2
Junior totals				19	2	8	10	4
Senior totals				34	6	7	13	4
