= Samuel Solem =

Norwegian ice hockey player

- Born: 1 April 1999 (age 27) Lørenskog, Norway
- Height: 1.85 m (6 ft 1 in)
- Weight: 93 kg (205 lb; 14 st 9 lb)
- Position: Left wing
- Shoots: Left
- Allsv team Former teams: Östersunds IK; Brynäs IF; Karlskrona HK; AIK IF; Storhamar Ishockey; Djurgårdens IF
- National team: Norway
- NHL draft: Undrafted
- Playing career: 2018–present

Samuel Solem (born 1 April 1999) is a Norwegian ice hockey player for Östersunds IK of the HockeyAllsvenskan and the Norwegian national team.

Solem had a short stint at Djurgårdens IF during the 2025–26 SHL season.

He represented Norway at the 2021 IIHF World Championship.
