= 2022 IIHF World Championship rosters =

Each team's roster consisted of at least 15 skaters (forwards and defencemen) and two goaltenders, and at most 22 skaters and three goaltenders. All 16 participating nations, through the confirmation of their respective national associations, have to submit a roster by the first IIHF directorate meeting.

Age and team as of 13 May 2022.

== Group A ==
=== Canada ===
The roster was announced on 9 May 2022.

Head coach: Claude Julien

No.	Pos.	Name	Height	Weight	Birthdate	Team
2	D	Zach Whitecloud	1.88 m (6 ft 2 in)	95 kg (209 lb)	28 November 1996 (aged 25)	(United States) Vegas Golden Knights
5	D	Nick Holden	1.93 m (6 ft 4 in)	97 kg (214 lb)	15 May 1987 (aged 34)	(Canada) Ottawa Senators
6	D	Travis Sanheim	1.93 m (6 ft 4 in)	91 kg (201 lb)	29 March 1996 (aged 26)	(United States) Philadelphia Flyers
10	F	Nicolas Roy	1.93 m (6 ft 4 in)	92 kg (203 lb)	5 February 1997 (aged 25)	(United States) Vegas Golden Knights
13	F	Mathew Barzal	1.85 m (6 ft 1 in)	85 kg (187 lb)	26 May 1997 (aged 24)	(United States) New York Islanders
16	F	Morgan Geekie	1.91 m (6 ft 3 in)	87 kg (192 lb)	20 July 1998 (aged 23)	(United States) Seattle Kraken
17	F	Adam Lowry	1.95 m (6 ft 5 in)	97 kg (214 lb)	29 March 1993 (aged 29)	(Canada) Winnipeg Jets
18	F	Dawson Mercer	1.83 m (6 ft 0 in)	82 kg (181 lb)	27 October 2001 (aged 20)	(United States) New Jersey Devils
19	F	Drake Batherson	1.88 m (6 ft 2 in)	85 kg (187 lb)	27 April 1998 (aged 24)	(Canada) Ottawa Senators
22	F	Eric O'Dell	1.85 m (6 ft 1 in)	91 kg (201 lb)	21 June 1990 (aged 31)	(Russia) Dynamo Moscow
24	F	Dylan Cozens	1.91 m (6 ft 3 in)	85 kg (187 lb)	9 February 2001 (aged 21)	(United States) Buffalo Sabres
28	D	Damon Severson	1.88 m (6 ft 2 in)	93 kg (205 lb)	7 August 1994 (aged 27)	(United States) New Jersey Devils
33	D	Ryan Graves	1.95 m (6 ft 5 in)	100 kg (220 lb)	21 May 1995 (aged 26)	(United States) New Jersey Devils
34	F	Cole Sillinger	1.83 m (6 ft 0 in)	85 kg (187 lb)	16 May 2003 (aged 18)	(United States) Columbus Blue Jackets
36	G	Logan Thompson	1.91 m (6 ft 3 in)	82 kg (181 lb)	25 February 1997 (aged 25)	(United States) Vegas Golden Knights
44	F	Max Comtois	1.89 m (6 ft 2 in)	98 kg (216 lb)	8 January 1999 (aged 23)	(United States) Anaheim Ducks
60	G	Chris Driedger	1.93 m (6 ft 4 in)	94 kg (207 lb)	18 May 1994 (aged 27)	(United States) Seattle Kraken
61	D	Dysin Mayo	1.88 m (6 ft 2 in)	88 kg (194 lb)	17 August 1996 (aged 25)	(United States) Arizona Coyotes
72	D	Thomas Chabot – C	1.88 m (6 ft 2 in)	89 kg (196 lb)	30 January 1997 (aged 25)	(Canada) Ottawa Senators
73	F	Noah Gregor	1.90 m (6 ft 3 in)	86 kg (190 lb)	28 July 1998 (aged 23)	(United States) San Jose Sharks
77	F	Josh Anderson – A	1.88 m (6 ft 2 in)	91 kg (201 lb)	7 May 1994 (aged 28)	(Canada) Montreal Canadiens
80	F	Pierre-Luc Dubois – A	1.91 m (6 ft 3 in)	94 kg (207 lb)	24 June 1998 (aged 23)	(Canada) Winnipeg Jets
90	G	Matt Tomkins	1.92 m (6 ft 4 in)	92 kg (203 lb)	19 June 1994 (aged 27)	(Sweden) Frölunda HC
93	F	Kent Johnson	1.85 m (6 ft 1 in)	76 kg (168 lb)	18 October 2002 (aged 19)	(United States) Columbus Blue Jackets

=== Denmark ===
A 26-player roster was announced on 3 May 2022.

Head coach: Heinz Ehlers

No.	Pos.	Name	Height	Weight	Birthdate	Team
1	G	Frederik Dichow	1.95 m (6 ft 5 in)	87 kg (192 lb)	1 March 2001 (aged 21)	(Sweden) Kristianstads IK
9	F	Frederik Storm	1.80 m (5 ft 11 in)	86 kg (190 lb)	20 February 1989 (aged 33)	(Germany) ERC Ingolstadt
15	D	Matias Lassen	1.82 m (6 ft 0 in)	82 kg (181 lb)	15 March 1996 (aged 26)	(Sweden) Malmö Redhawks
19	F	Matthias Asperup	1.82 m (6 ft 0 in)	84 kg (185 lb)	3 March 1995 (aged 27)	(Denmark) Herlev Eagles
22	D	Markus Lauridsen	1.86 m (6 ft 1 in)	87 kg (192 lb)	28 February 1991 (aged 31)	(Sweden) Malmö Redhawks
24	F	Nikolaj Ehlers	1.85 m (6 ft 1 in)	82 kg (181 lb)	14 February 1996 (aged 26)	(Canada) Winnipeg Jets
25	D	Oliver Lauridsen	1.97 m (6 ft 6 in)	93 kg (205 lb)	24 March 1989 (aged 33)	(Sweden) Malmö Redhawks
26	F	Patrick Bjorkstrand	1.88 m (6 ft 2 in)	87 kg (192 lb)	1 July 1992 (aged 29)	(Denmark) Aalborg Pirates
28	D	Emil Kristensen	1.84 m (6 ft 0 in)	81 kg (179 lb)	20 September 1992 (aged 29)	(Italy) HC Pustertal Wölfe
31	G	Mathias Seldrup	1.80 m (5 ft 11 in)	82 kg (181 lb)	21 October 1996 (aged 25)	(Denmark) Frederikshavn White Hawks
32	G	Sebastian Dahm	1.82 m (6 ft 0 in)	83 kg (183 lb)	28 February 1987 (aged 35)	(Austria) EC KAC
33	F	Julian Jakobsen	1.84 m (6 ft 0 in)	87 kg (192 lb)	11 April 1987 (aged 35)	(Denmark) Aalborg Pirates
34	D	Morten Jensen	1.83 m (6 ft 0 in)	82 kg (181 lb)	1 March 1997 (aged 25)	(Denmark) Rungsted Ishockey Klub
38	F	Morten Poulsen	1.86 m (6 ft 1 in)	95 kg (209 lb)	9 September 1988 (aged 33)	(Denmark) Herning Blue Fox
41	D	Jesper B. Jensen – A	1.83 m (6 ft 0 in)	93 kg (205 lb)	30 July 1991 (aged 30)	(Germany) Krefeld Pinguine
42	F	Mikkel Aagaard	1.84 m (6 ft 0 in)	81 kg (179 lb)	18 October 1995 (aged 26)	(Sweden) Modo Hockey
47	D	Oliver Larsen	1.85 m (6 ft 1 in)	94 kg (207 lb)	25 December 1998 (aged 23)	(Finland) Mikkelin Jukurit
48	D	Nicholas Jensen	1.89 m (6 ft 2 in)	102 kg (225 lb)	8 April 1989 (aged 33)	(Germany) Eisbären Berlin
50	F	Mathias Bau Hansen	2.00 m (6 ft 7 in)	108 kg (238 lb)	3 July 1993 (aged 28)	(Denmark) Herning Blue Fox
51	F	Frans Nielsen – A	1.83 m (6 ft 0 in)	84 kg (185 lb)	24 April 1984 (aged 38)	(Germany) Eisbären Berlin
54	F	Felix Scheel	1.83 m (6 ft 0 in)	89 kg (196 lb)	1 September 1992 (aged 29)	(Denmark) Esbjerg Energy
65	F	Christian Wejse	1.86 m (6 ft 1 in)	88 kg (194 lb)	4 December 1998 (aged 23)	(Germany) Fischtown Pinguins
72	F	Nicolai Meyer	1.79 m (5 ft 10 in)	82 kg (181 lb)	21 July 1993 (aged 28)	(Austria) Vienna Capitals
86	F	Joachim Blichfeld	1.87 m (6 ft 2 in)	82 kg (181 lb)	17 July 1998 (aged 23)	(United States) San Jose Barracuda
93	F	Peter Regin – C	1.87 m (6 ft 2 in)	90 kg (200 lb)	16 April 1986 (aged 36)	(Switzerland) HC Ambrì-Piotta

=== France ===
A 27-player roster was announced on 4 May 2022. The final squad was revealed on 9 May 2022.

Head coach: Philippe Bozon

No.	Pos.	Name	Height	Weight	Birthdate	Team
3	F	Charles Bertrand	1.85 m (6 ft 1 in)	91 kg (201 lb)	5 February 1991 (aged 31)	(Finland) Tappara
5	D	Enzo Guebey	1.84 m (6 ft 0 in)	88 kg (194 lb)	6 May 1999 (aged 23)	(Switzerland) ZSC Lions
6	D	Vincent Llorca	1.93 m (6 ft 4 in)	93 kg (205 lb)	16 January 1992 (aged 30)	(France) Ducs d'Angers
7	D	Pierre Crinon	1.95 m (6 ft 5 in)	104 kg (229 lb)	2 August 1995 (aged 26)	(France) Brûleurs de Loups
8	D	Hugo Gallet	1.92 m (6 ft 4 in)	93 kg (205 lb)	20 June 1997 (aged 24)	(Finland) KalPa
9	F	Damien Fleury – C	1.80 m (5 ft 11 in)	84 kg (185 lb)	1 February 1986 (aged 36)	(France) Brûleurs de Loups
12	F	Valentin Claireaux – A	1.80 m (5 ft 11 in)	89 kg (196 lb)	5 April 1991 (aged 31)	(Switzerland) EHC Kloten
18	D	Yohann Auvitu	1.82 m (6 ft 0 in)	89 kg (196 lb)	27 July 1989 (aged 32)	(Finland) HIFK
20	F	Fabien Colotti	1.78 m (5 ft 10 in)	81 kg (179 lb)	27 August 1996 (aged 25)	(France) Rapaces de Gap
22	F	Guillaume Leclerc	1.73 m (5 ft 8 in)	78 kg (172 lb)	20 February 1996 (aged 26)	(Slovenia) HK Olimpija
25	F	Nicolas Ritz	1.80 m (5 ft 11 in)	90 kg (200 lb)	26 February 1992 (aged 30)	(France) Ducs d'Angers
26	D	Romain Bault	1.78 m (5 ft 10 in)	84 kg (185 lb)	29 January 1990 (aged 32)	(France) Gothiques d'Amiens
32	G	Quentin Papillon	1.77 m (5 ft 10 in)	78 kg (172 lb)	7 April 1997 (aged 25)	(Norway) Grüner Ishockey
35	G	Henri-Corentin Buysse	1.86 m (6 ft 1 in)	86 kg (190 lb)	18 March 1988 (aged 34)	(France) Gothiques d'Amiens
37	G	Sebastian Ylönen	1.86 m (6 ft 1 in)	81 kg (179 lb)	3 July 1991 (aged 30)	(France) Jokers de Cergy-Pontoise
42	F	Alexandre Texier	1.85 m (6 ft 1 in)	88 kg (194 lb)	13 September 1999 (aged 22)	(United States) Columbus Blue Jackets
62	D	Florian Chakiachvili	1.86 m (6 ft 1 in)	90 kg (200 lb)	18 March 1992 (aged 30)	(France) Dragons de Rouen
63	F	Louis Boudon	1.79 m (5 ft 10 in)	82 kg (181 lb)	4 October 1998 (aged 23)	(United States) Lake Superior State Lakers
72	F	Jordann Perret	1.79 m (5 ft 10 in)	82 kg (181 lb)	15 October 1994 (aged 27)	(Czech Republic) Mountfield HK
74	D	Thomas Thiry	1.91 m (6 ft 3 in)	101 kg (223 lb)	9 September 1997 (aged 24)	(Switzerland) SC Bern
77	F	Sacha Treille – A	1.93 m (6 ft 4 in)	100 kg (220 lb)	6 November 1987 (aged 34)	(France) Brûleurs de Loups
81	F	Anthony Rech	1.80 m (5 ft 11 in)	87 kg (192 lb)	9 July 1992 (aged 29)	(Germany) Grizzlys Wolfsburg
83	F	Dylan Fabre	1.79 m (5 ft 10 in)	78 kg (172 lb)	10 November 2000 (aged 21)	(France) Brûleurs de Loups
94	F	Tim Bozon	1.86 m (6 ft 1 in)	92 kg (203 lb)	24 March 1994 (aged 28)	(Switzerland) Lausanne HC
95	F	Kévin Bozon	1.87 m (6 ft 2 in)	88 kg (194 lb)	30 December 1995 (aged 26)	(Switzerland) EHC Winterthur

=== Germany ===
A 28-player roster was announced on 5 May 2022. The final squad was revealed on 9 May 2022.

Head coach: Toni Söderholm

No.	Pos.	Name	Height	Weight	Birthdate	Team
1	G	Dustin Strahlmeier	1.90 m (6 ft 3 in)	96 kg (212 lb)	17 May 1992 (aged 29)	(Germany) Grizzlys Wolfsburg
3	D	Dominik Bittner	1.81 m (5 ft 11 in)	76 kg (168 lb)	10 June 1992 (aged 29)	(Germany) Grizzlys Wolfsburg
5	D	Korbinian Holzer – A	1.90 m (6 ft 3 in)	94 kg (207 lb)	16 February 1988 (aged 34)	(Germany) Adler Mannheim
6	D	Kai Wissmann	1.90 m (6 ft 3 in)	88 kg (194 lb)	22 October 1996 (aged 25)	(Germany) Eisbären Berlin
7	F	Maximilian Kastner	1.80 m (5 ft 11 in)	84 kg (185 lb)	3 January 1993 (aged 29)	(Germany) EHC Red Bull München
9	D	Leon Gawanke	1.86 m (6 ft 1 in)	90 kg (200 lb)	31 May 1999 (aged 22)	(Canada) Manitoba Moose
15	F	Stefan Loibl	1.86 m (6 ft 1 in)	83 kg (183 lb)	24 June 1996 (aged 25)	(Sweden) Skellefteå AIK
18	F	Tim Stützle	1.84 m (6 ft 0 in)	87 kg (192 lb)	15 January 2002 (aged 20)	(Canada) Ottawa Senators
22	F	Matthias Plachta	1.88 m (6 ft 2 in)	100 kg (220 lb)	16 May 1991 (aged 30)	(Germany) Adler Mannheim
25	F	Daniel Schmölz	1.80 m (5 ft 11 in)	91 kg (201 lb)	25 January 1992 (aged 30)	(Germany) Nürnberg Ice Tigers
26	F	Samuel Soramies	1.85 m (6 ft 1 in)	88 kg (194 lb)	30 June 1998 (aged 23)	(Germany) ERC Ingolstadt
30	G	Philipp Grubauer	1.85 m (6 ft 1 in)	84 kg (185 lb)	25 November 1991 (aged 30)	(United States) Seattle Kraken
35	G	Mathias Niederberger	1.80 m (5 ft 11 in)	80 kg (180 lb)	26 November 1992 (aged 29)	(Germany) Eisbären Berlin
38	D	Fabio Wagner	1.82 m (6 ft 0 in)	83 kg (183 lb)	17 September 1995 (aged 26)	(Germany) ERC Ingolstadt
40	F	Alexander Ehl	1.75 m (5 ft 9 in)	76 kg (168 lb)	28 November 1999 (aged 22)	(Germany) Düsseldorfer EG
41	D	Jonas Müller	1.83 m (6 ft 0 in)	88 kg (194 lb)	19 November 1995 (aged 26)	(Germany) Eisbären Berlin
42	F	Yasin Ehliz	1.77 m (5 ft 10 in)	84 kg (185 lb)	30 December 1992 (aged 29)	(Germany) EHC Red Bull München
53	D	Moritz Seider	1.92 m (6 ft 4 in)	90 kg (200 lb)	6 April 2001 (aged 21)	(United States) Detroit Red Wings
65	F	Marc Michaelis	1.77 m (5 ft 10 in)	79 kg (174 lb)	31 July 1995 (aged 26)	(Canada) Toronto Marlies
73	F	Lukas Reichel	1.83 m (6 ft 0 in)	78 kg (172 lb)	17 May 2002 (aged 19)	(United States) Rockford IceHogs
77	F	Daniel Fischbuch	1.80 m (5 ft 11 in)	80 kg (180 lb)	19 August 1993 (aged 28)	(Germany) Düsseldorfer EG
83	F	Leonhard Pföderl	1.82 m (6 ft 0 in)	87 kg (192 lb)	1 September 1993 (aged 28)	(Germany) Eisbären Berlin
91	D	Moritz Müller – C	1.87 m (6 ft 2 in)	92 kg (203 lb)	19 November 1986 (aged 35)	(Germany) Kölner Haie
92	F	Marcel Noebels – A	1.92 m (6 ft 4 in)	92 kg (203 lb)	14 March 1992 (aged 30)	(Germany) Eisbären Berlin
94	F	Alexander Karachun	1.88 m (6 ft 2 in)	92 kg (203 lb)	3 March 1995 (aged 27)	(Germany) Schwenninger Wild Wings

=== Italy ===
A 28-player roster was announced on 4 May 2022. The final squad was revealed on 11 May 2022.

Head coach: Greg Ireland

No.	Pos.	Name	Height	Weight	Birthdate	Team
1	G	Andreas Bernard	1.83 m (6 ft 0 in)	80 kg (180 lb)	9 June 1990 (aged 31)	(Italy) HC Bozen–Bolzano
5	F	Marco Sanna	1.88 m (6 ft 2 in)	92 kg (203 lb)	18 December 1997 (aged 24)	(Italy) SG Cortina
8	F	Marco Insam – A	1.88 m (6 ft 2 in)	92 kg (203 lb)	5 June 1989 (aged 32)	(Italy) HC Bozen–Bolzano
9	F	Daniel Mantenuto	1.75 m (5 ft 9 in)	77 kg (170 lb)	18 October 1997 (aged 24)	(Italy) Asiago Hockey
10	D	Peter Spornberger	1.86 m (6 ft 1 in)	90 kg (200 lb)	6 January 1999 (aged 23)	(Germany) Schwenninger Wild Wings
15	D	Enrico Miglioranzi	1.83 m (6 ft 0 in)	86 kg (190 lb)	8 October 1991 (aged 30)	(Italy) Asiago Hockey
17	D	Lorenzo Casetti	1.90 m (6 ft 3 in)	90 kg (200 lb)	14 September 1993 (aged 28)	(Italy) Asiago Hockey
19	F	Alex Petan – A	1.75 m (5 ft 9 in)	82 kg (181 lb)	2 May 1992 (aged 30)	(Hungary) Fehérvár AV19
21	D	Daniel Glira	1.88 m (6 ft 2 in)	87 kg (192 lb)	25 March 1994 (aged 28)	(Italy) Pustertal Wölfe
22	F	Simon Kostner	1.83 m (6 ft 0 in)	82 kg (181 lb)	30 November 1990 (aged 31)	(Italy) Ritten Sport
23	F	Diego Kostner	1.72 m (5 ft 8 in)	77 kg (170 lb)	5 August 1992 (aged 29)	(Switzerland) HC Ambrì-Piotta
32	G	Justin Fazio	1.85 m (6 ft 1 in)	87 kg (192 lb)	3 May 1997 (aged 25)	(Italy) HC Bozen–Bolzano
35	G	Davide Fadani	1.82 m (6 ft 0 in)	76 kg (168 lb)	3 February 2001 (aged 21)	(Switzerland) HC Lugano
37	D	Phil Pietroniro	1.85 m (6 ft 1 in)	80 kg (180 lb)	27 May 1994 (aged 27)	(France) Scorpions de Mulhouse
44	D	Gregorio Gios	1.83 m (6 ft 0 in)	92 kg (203 lb)	29 June 1999 (aged 22)	(Italy) Asiago Hockey
46	F	Ivan Deluca	1.93 m (6 ft 4 in)	93 kg (205 lb)	28 July 1997 (aged 24)	(Italy) HC Pustertal Wölfe
53	D	Alex Trivellato	1.89 m (6 ft 2 in)	83 kg (183 lb)	5 January 1993 (aged 29)	(Italy) HC Bozen–Bolzano
74	F	Brandon McNally	1.88 m (6 ft 2 in)	94 kg (207 lb)	8 February 1992 (aged 30)	(United Kingdom) Cardiff Devils
82	F	Dante Hannoun	1.68 m (5 ft 6 in)	73 kg (161 lb)	2 August 1998 (aged 23)	(Italy) HC Pustertal Wölfe
88	F	Tommaso Traversa	1.71 m (5 ft 7 in)	77 kg (170 lb)	4 August 1990 (aged 31)	(United Kingdom) Sheffield Steelers
90	D	Dylan Di Perna	1.88 m (6 ft 2 in)	92 kg (203 lb)	26 April 1996 (aged 26)	(Italy) Ritten Sport
91	F	Matthias Mantinger	1.79 m (5 ft 10 in)	76 kg (168 lb)	22 April 1996 (aged 26)	(Italy) HC Pustertal Wölfe
93	F	Luca Frigo	1.83 m (6 ft 0 in)	90 kg (200 lb)	30 May 1993 (aged 28)	(Italy) HC Bozen–Bolzano
94	F	Daniel Frank – C	1.87 m (6 ft 2 in)	90 kg (200 lb)	21 March 1994 (aged 28)	(Italy) HC Bozen–Bolzano
95	F	Marco Magnabosco	1.75 m (5 ft 9 in)	76 kg (168 lb)	12 August 1995 (aged 26)	(Italy) Asiago Hockey

=== Kazakhstan ===
A 32-player roster was announced on 2 May 2022. The final squad was revealed on 11 May 2022.

Head coach: Yuri Mikhailis

No.	Pos.	Name	Height	Weight	Birthdate	Team
4	D	Yegor Shalapov	1.79 m (5 ft 10 in)	89 kg (196 lb)	27 January 1995 (aged 27)	(Kazakhstan) Barys Nur-Sultan
7	D	Leonid Metalnikov	1.82 m (6 ft 0 in)	85 kg (187 lb)	25 April 1990 (aged 32)	(Russia) Admiral Vladivostok
9	D	Jesse Blacker	1.85 m (6 ft 1 in)	86 kg (190 lb)	19 April 1991 (aged 31)	(Russia) Avtomobilist Yekaterinburg
10	F	Nikita Mikhailis – A	1.75 m (5 ft 9 in)	70 kg (150 lb)	18 June 1995 (aged 26)	(Kazakhstan) Barys Nur-Sultan
14	F	Curtis Valk – A	1.75 m (5 ft 9 in)	75 kg (165 lb)	8 February 1993 (aged 29)	(Kazakhstan) Barys Nur-Sultan
15	F	Yegor Petukhov	1.80 m (5 ft 11 in)	80 kg (180 lb)	28 February 1994 (aged 28)	(Kazakhstan) Barys Nur-Sultan
18	F	Pavel Akolzin	1.96 m (6 ft 5 in)	100 kg (220 lb)	25 November 1990 (aged 31)	(Russia) Metallurg Magnitogorsk
20	G	Sergei Kudryavtsev	1.88 m (6 ft 2 in)	90 kg (200 lb)	5 April 1995 (aged 27)	(Russia) Yuzhny Ural Orsk
22	F	Kirill Panyukov	1.85 m (6 ft 1 in)	82 kg (181 lb)	22 May 1997 (aged 24)	(Russia) Ak Bars Kazan
26	F	Mikhail Rakhmanov	1.76 m (5 ft 9 in)	77 kg (170 lb)	27 May 1992 (aged 29)	(Kazakhstan) Saryarka Karagandy
28	D	Valeri Orekhov	1.86 m (6 ft 1 in)	76 kg (168 lb)	17 July 1999 (aged 22)	(Kazakhstan) Barys Nur-Sultan
30	G	Ilya Rumyantsev	1.75 m (5 ft 9 in)	70 kg (150 lb)	15 October 1995 (aged 26)	(Kazakhstan) Arlan Kokshetau
43	G	Andrei Shutov	1.88 m (6 ft 2 in)	83 kg (183 lb)	4 March 1998 (aged 24)	(Kazakhstan) Barys Nur-Sultan
44	D	Darren Dietz	1.87 m (6 ft 2 in)	95 kg (209 lb)	17 July 1993 (aged 28)	(Russia) HC CSKA Moscow
48	F	Roman Starchenko – C	1.79 m (5 ft 10 in)	88 kg (194 lb)	12 May 1986 (aged 36)	(Kazakhstan) Barys Nur-Sultan
58	D	Viktor Svedberg	2.04 m (6 ft 8 in)	105 kg (231 lb)	24 May 1991 (aged 30)	(Russia) Avangard Omsk
64	F	Arkadiy Shestakov	1.82 m (6 ft 0 in)	83 kg (183 lb)	24 March 1995 (aged 27)	(Kazakhstan) Barys Nur-Sultan
65	D	Samat Daniyar	1.83 m (6 ft 0 in)	73 kg (161 lb)	24 January 1999 (aged 23)	(Kazakhstan) Barys Nur-Sultan
68	F	Dmitri Gurkov	1.86 m (6 ft 1 in)	80 kg (180 lb)	3 June 1996 (aged 25)	(Kazakhstan) Barys Nur-Sultan
77	F	Sayan Daniyar	1.81 m (5 ft 11 in)	72 kg (159 lb)	5 October 1999 (aged 22)	(Kazakhstan) Saryarka Karagandy
84	F	Kirill Savitski	1.83 m (6 ft 0 in)	87 kg (192 lb)	9 March 1996 (aged 26)	(Kazakhstan) Barys Nur-Sultan
87	D	Adil Beketayev	1.93 m (6 ft 4 in)	94 kg (207 lb)	23 April 1998 (aged 24)	(Kazakhstan) Nomad Nur-Sultan
89	F	Anton Sagadeyev	1.80 m (5 ft 11 in)	86 kg (190 lb)	6 September 1993 (aged 28)	(Kazakhstan) Barys Nur-Sultan
95	F	Dmitri Shevchenko	1.95 m (6 ft 5 in)	103 kg (227 lb)	15 December 1995 (aged 26)	(Russia) Avangard Omsk
96	F	Alikhan Asetov	1.86 m (6 ft 1 in)	91 kg (201 lb)	26 August 1996 (aged 25)	(Kazakhstan) Barys Nur-Sultan

=== Slovakia ===
A 27-player roster was announced on 7 May 2022. The final squad was revealed on 9 May 2022.

Head coach: Craig Ramsay

No.	Pos.	Name	Height	Weight	Birthdate	Team
3	D	Adam Jánošík	1.80 m (5 ft 11 in)	85 kg (187 lb)	7 September 1992 (aged 29)	(Czech Republic) BK Mladá Boleslav
5	D	Šimon Nemec	1.83 m (6 ft 0 in)	87 kg (192 lb)	15 February 2004 (aged 18)	(Slovakia) HK Nitra
6	D	Martin Fehérváry	1.87 m (6 ft 2 in)	92 kg (203 lb)	6 October 1999 (aged 22)	(United States) Washington Capitals
7	D	Mário Grman	1.86 m (6 ft 1 in)	95 kg (209 lb)	11 April 1997 (aged 25)	(Finland) HPK
10	F	Adam Sýkora	1.78 m (5 ft 10 in)	78 kg (172 lb)	7 September 2004 (aged 17)	(Slovakia) HK Nitra
13	F	Michal Krištof – A	1.75 m (5 ft 9 in)	74 kg (163 lb)	11 October 1993 (aged 28)	(Czech Republic) HC Kometa Brno
14	D	Peter Čerešňák – A	1.91 m (6 ft 3 in)	95 kg (209 lb)	26 January 1993 (aged 29)	(Czech Republic) HC Škoda Plzeň
15	F	Jakub Minárik	1.91 m (6 ft 3 in)	95 kg (209 lb)	6 July 2000 (aged 21)	(Slovakia) HK Dukla Trenčín
16	F	Róbert Lantoši	1.80 m (5 ft 11 in)	84 kg (185 lb)	24 September 1995 (aged 26)	(Sweden) Linköping HC
20	F	Juraj Slafkovský	1.92 m (6 ft 4 in)	102 kg (225 lb)	30 March 2004 (aged 18)	(Finland) HC TPS
23	F	Adam Liška	1.80 m (5 ft 11 in)	84 kg (185 lb)	14 October 1999 (aged 22)	(Russia) Severstal Cherepovets
24	G	Patrik Rybár	1.90 m (6 ft 3 in)	85 kg (187 lb)	9 November 1993 (aged 28)	(Belarus) HC Dinamo Minsk
25	F	Alex Tamáši	1.84 m (6 ft 0 in)	85 kg (187 lb)	25 March 1998 (aged 24)	(Slovakia) HC '05 Banská Bystrica
29	D	Michal Ivan	1.85 m (6 ft 1 in)	85 kg (187 lb)	18 November 1999 (aged 22)	(Czech Republic) HC Bílí Tygři Liberec
30	G	Matej Tomek	1.91 m (6 ft 3 in)	83 kg (183 lb)	24 May 1997 (aged 24)	(Czech Republic) HC Kometa Brno
35	G	Adam Húska	1.94 m (6 ft 4 in)	96 kg (212 lb)	12 May 1997 (aged 25)	(United States) Hartford Wolf Pack
40	F	Miloš Roman	1.82 m (6 ft 0 in)	83 kg (183 lb)	6 November 1999 (aged 22)	(Czech Republic) Oceláři Třinec
44	D	Mislav Rosandić	1.81 m (5 ft 11 in)	85 kg (187 lb)	26 January 1995 (aged 27)	(Czech Republic) Bílí Tygři Liberec
47	F	Mário Lunter	1.82 m (6 ft 0 in)	90 kg (200 lb)	20 June 1994 (aged 27)	(Czech Republic) BK Mladá Boleslav
48	D	Daniel Gachulinec	1.80 m (5 ft 11 in)	83 kg (183 lb)	16 February 1994 (aged 28)	(Slovakia) HC Slovan Bratislava
49	F	Samuel Takáč	1.84 m (6 ft 0 in)	92 kg (203 lb)	3 December 1991 (aged 30)	(Slovakia) HC Slovan Bratislava
72	F	Andrej Kollár	1.87 m (6 ft 2 in)	86 kg (190 lb)	4 November 1999 (aged 22)	(Czech Republic) HC Kometa Brno
87	F	Pavol Regenda	1.92 m (6 ft 4 in)	96 kg (212 lb)	7 December 1999 (aged 22)	(Slovakia) HK Dukla Michalovce
88	F	Kristián Pospíšil	1.88 m (6 ft 2 in)	95 kg (209 lb)	22 April 1996 (aged 26)	(Switzerland) HC Davos
90	F	Tomáš Tatar – C	1.78 m (5 ft 10 in)	80 kg (180 lb)	1 December 1990 (aged 31)	(United States) New Jersey Devils

=== Switzerland ===
A 26-player roster was announced on 6 May 2022. It was reduced to 22 on 9 May 2022.

Head coach: Patrick Fischer

No.	Pos.	Name	Height	Weight	Birthdate	Team
9	F	Damien Riat	1.83 m (6 ft 0 in)	78 kg (172 lb)	26 February 1997 (aged 25)	(Switzerland) Lausanne HC
10	F	Andres Ambühl – A	1.76 m (5 ft 9 in)	86 kg (190 lb)	14 September 1983 (aged 38)	(Switzerland) HC Davos
13	F	Nico Hischier – C	1.86 m (6 ft 1 in)	88 kg (194 lb)	4 January 1999 (aged 23)	(United States) New Jersey Devils
14	D	Dean Kukan	1.87 m (6 ft 2 in)	90 kg (200 lb)	8 July 1993 (aged 28)	(United States) Columbus Blue Jackets
20	G	Reto Berra	1.94 m (6 ft 4 in)	99 kg (218 lb)	3 January 1987 (aged 35)	(Switzerland) HC Fribourg-Gottéron
23	F	Philipp Kurashev	1.83 m (6 ft 0 in)	86 kg (190 lb)	12 October 1999 (aged 22)	(United States) Chicago Blackhawks
24	D	Tobias Geisser	1.93 m (6 ft 4 in)	91 kg (201 lb)	13 February 1999 (aged 23)	(United States) Hershey Bears
26	G	Sandro Aeschlimann	1.84 m (6 ft 0 in)	84 kg (185 lb)	26 December 1994 (aged 27)	(Switzerland) HC Davos
28	F	Timo Meier	1.86 m (6 ft 1 in)	98 kg (216 lb)	8 October 1996 (aged 25)	(United States) San Jose Sharks
43	D	Andrea Glauser	1.82 m (6 ft 0 in)	86 kg (190 lb)	3 April 1996 (aged 26)	(Switzerland) Lausanne HC
44	F	Pius Suter	1.80 m (5 ft 11 in)	80 kg (180 lb)	24 May 1996 (aged 25)	(United States) Detroit Red Wings
45	D	Michael Fora – A	1.89 m (6 ft 2 in)	94 kg (207 lb)	30 October 1995 (aged 26)	(Switzerland) HC Davos
54	D	Christian Marti	1.90 m (6 ft 3 in)	95 kg (209 lb)	29 March 1993 (aged 29)	(Switzerland) ZSC Lions
59	F	Dario Simion	1.90 m (6 ft 3 in)	87 kg (192 lb)	22 May 1994 (aged 27)	(Switzerland) EV Zug
60	F	Tristan Scherwey	1.76 m (5 ft 9 in)	85 kg (187 lb)	7 May 1991 (aged 31)	(Switzerland) SC Bern
61	F	Fabrice Herzog	1.89 m (6 ft 2 in)	89 kg (196 lb)	9 December 1994 (aged 27)	(Switzerland) EV Zug
62	F	Denis Malgin	1.75 m (5 ft 9 in)	80 kg (180 lb)	18 January 1997 (aged 25)	(Switzerland) ZSC Lions
63	G	Leonardo Genoni	1.82 m (6 ft 0 in)	87 kg (192 lb)	28 August 1987 (aged 34)	(Switzerland) EV Zug
71	F	Enzo Corvi	1.83 m (6 ft 0 in)	86 kg (190 lb)	23 December 1992 (aged 29)	(Switzerland) HC Davos
72	D	Dominik Egli	1.74 m (5 ft 9 in)	79 kg (174 lb)	20 August 1998 (aged 23)	(Switzerland) HC Davos
79	F	Calvin Thürkauf	1.88 m (6 ft 2 in)	96 kg (212 lb)	27 June 1997 (aged 24)	(Switzerland) HC Lugano
86	D	Janis Moser	1.85 m (6 ft 1 in)	78 kg (172 lb)	6 June 2000 (aged 21)	(United States) Arizona Coyotes
88	F	Christoph Bertschy	1.78 m (5 ft 10 in)	84 kg (185 lb)	5 April 1994 (aged 28)	(Switzerland) Lausanne HC
97	D	Jonas Siegenthaler	1.88 m (6 ft 2 in)	99 kg (218 lb)	6 May 1997 (aged 25)	(United States) New Jersey Devils
98	F	Marco Miranda	1.90 m (6 ft 3 in)	94 kg (207 lb)	2 June 1998 (aged 23)	(Switzerland) Genève-Servette HC

== Group B ==
=== Austria ===
The roster was announced on 9 May 2022.

Head coach: Roger Bader

No.	Pos.	Name	Height	Weight	Birthdate	Team
3	F	Peter Schneider	1.83 m (6 ft 0 in)	91 kg (201 lb)	4 April 1991 (aged 31)	(Austria) Red Bull Salzburg
4	D	Dominic Hackl	1.86 m (6 ft 1 in)	86 kg (190 lb)	8 November 1996 (aged 25)	(Austria) Vienna Capitals
5	F	Thomas Raffl – C	1.94 m (6 ft 4 in)	104 kg (229 lb)	19 June 1986 (aged 35)	(Austria) Red Bull Salzburg
7	F	Brian Lebler	1.91 m (6 ft 3 in)	96 kg (212 lb)	16 July 1988 (aged 33)	(Austria) Red Bull Salzburg
9	F	Ali Wukovits	1.84 m (6 ft 0 in)	83 kg (183 lb)	9 May 1996 (aged 26)	(Austria) Red Bull Salzburg
12	D	David Maier	1.87 m (6 ft 2 in)	83 kg (183 lb)	12 January 2000 (aged 22)	(Austria) EC KAC
13	D	Philipp Wimmer	1.93 m (6 ft 4 in)	93 kg (205 lb)	13 December 2001 (aged 20)	(Austria) Red Bull Salzburg
14	D	Kilian Zündel	1.79 m (5 ft 10 in)	75 kg (165 lb)	17 January 2001 (aged 21)	(Austria) Red Bull Salzburg
17	F	Manuel Ganahl – A	1.82 m (6 ft 0 in)	81 kg (179 lb)	12 July 1990 (aged 31)	(Austria) EC KAC
20	D	Nico Brunner	1.81 m (5 ft 11 in)	78 kg (172 lb)	17 September 1992 (aged 29)	(Austria) EC VSV
21	F	Lukas Haudum	1.83 m (6 ft 0 in)	84 kg (185 lb)	21 May 1997 (aged 24)	(Austria) EC KAC
24	F	Marco Kasper	1.84 m (6 ft 0 in)	80 kg (180 lb)	8 April 2004 (aged 18)	(Sweden) Rögle BK
26	F	Oliver Achermann	1.95 m (6 ft 5 in)	93 kg (205 lb)	16 January 1994 (aged 28)	(Switzerland) HC La Chaux-de-Fonds
29	G	Bernhard Starkbaum	1.86 m (6 ft 1 in)	91 kg (201 lb)	19 February 1986 (aged 36)	(Austria) Vienna Capitals
30	G	David Kickert	1.88 m (6 ft 2 in)	81 kg (179 lb)	16 March 1994 (aged 28)	(Austria) Vienna Capitals
31	G	David Madlener	1.87 m (6 ft 2 in)	88 kg (194 lb)	31 March 1992 (aged 30)	(Austria) Dornbirn Bulldogs
32	D	Bernd Wolf	1.78 m (5 ft 10 in)	84 kg (185 lb)	23 February 1997 (aged 25)	(Switzerland) HC Lugano
36	F	Simeon Schwinger	1.82 m (6 ft 0 in)	75 kg (165 lb)	7 October 1997 (aged 24)	(Austria) Dornbirn Bulldogs
52	F	Paul Huber	1.93 m (6 ft 4 in)	101 kg (223 lb)	10 June 2000 (aged 21)	(Austria) Red Bull Salzburg
70	F	Benjamin Nissner	1.81 m (5 ft 11 in)	80 kg (180 lb)	30 November 1997 (aged 24)	(Austria) Red Bull Salzburg
71	D	Erik Kirchschläger	1.78 m (5 ft 10 in)	79 kg (174 lb)	4 February 1996 (aged 26)	(Austria) Graz 99ers
74	F	Nico Feldner	1.88 m (6 ft 2 in)	88 kg (194 lb)	11 October 1998 (aged 23)	(United Kingdom) Sheffield Steelers
91	D	Dominique Heinrich – A	1.75 m (5 ft 9 in)	76 kg (168 lb)	31 July 1990 (aged 31)	(Austria) Red Bull Salzburg
92	D	Clemens Unterweger	1.83 m (6 ft 0 in)	85 kg (187 lb)	1 April 1992 (aged 30)	(Austria) EC KAC
98	F	Benjamin Baumgartner	1.76 m (5 ft 9 in)	78 kg (172 lb)	22 April 2000 (aged 22)	(Switzerland) Lausanne HC

=== Czechia ===
The roster was announced on 7 May 2022.

Head coach: Kari Jalonen

No.	Pos.	Name	Height	Weight	Birthdate	Team
2	G	Lukáš Dostál	1.85 m (6 ft 1 in)	72 kg (159 lb)	22 June 2000 (aged 21)	(United States) San Diego Gulls
5	D	David Jiříček	1.91 m (6 ft 3 in)	85 kg (187 lb)	28 November 2003 (aged 18)	(Czech Republic) HC Škoda Plzeň
6	D	Michal Kempný	1.83 m (6 ft 0 in)	88 kg (194 lb)	8 September 1990 (aged 31)	(United States) Washington Capitals
9	D	David Sklenička	1.80 m (5 ft 11 in)	82 kg (181 lb)	8 September 1996 (aged 25)	(Finland) Oulun Kärpät
10	F	Roman Červenka – C	1.82 m (6 ft 0 in)	89 kg (196 lb)	10 December 1985 (aged 36)	(Switzerland) SC Rapperswil-Jona Lakers
12	F	Jiří Černoch	1.75 m (5 ft 9 in)	90 kg (200 lb)	1 September 1996 (aged 25)	(Czech Republic) HC Energie Karlovy Vary
13	F	Jakub Vrána	1.83 m (6 ft 0 in)	80 kg (180 lb)	28 February 1996 (aged 26)	(United States) Detroit Red Wings
17	D	Filip Hronek	1.82 m (6 ft 0 in)	75 kg (165 lb)	2 November 1997 (aged 24)	(United States) Detroit Red Wings
19	F	Jakub Flek	1.72 m (5 ft 8 in)	74 kg (163 lb)	24 December 1992 (aged 29)	(Czech Republic) HC Energie Karlovy Vary
20	F	Hynek Zohorna	1.88 m (6 ft 2 in)	94 kg (207 lb)	1 August 1990 (aged 31)	(Sweden) IK Oskarshamn
24	D	Jan Ščotka – A	1.87 m (6 ft 2 in)	91 kg (201 lb)	20 May 1996 (aged 25)	(Finland) JYP Jyväskylä
44	F	Matěj Stránský	1.91 m (6 ft 3 in)	93 kg (205 lb)	11 July 1993 (aged 28)	(Switzerland) HC Davos
46	F	David Krejčí – A	1.83 m (6 ft 0 in)	80 kg (180 lb)	28 April 1986 (aged 36)	(Czech Republic) HC Olomouc
47	D	Michal Jordán	1.85 m (6 ft 1 in)	90 kg (200 lb)	17 July 1990 (aged 31)	(Russia) Amur Khabarovsk
48	F	Tomáš Hertl	1.88 m (6 ft 2 in)	89 kg (196 lb)	12 November 1993 (aged 28)	(United States) San Jose Sharks
50	G	Karel Vejmelka	1.90 m (6 ft 3 in)	90 kg (200 lb)	25 May 1996 (aged 25)	(United States) Arizona Coyotes
51	D	Radim Šimek	1.80 m (5 ft 11 in)	89 kg (196 lb)	20 September 1992 (aged 29)	(United States) San Jose Sharks
52	F	Michael Špaček	1.80 m (5 ft 11 in)	85 kg (187 lb)	9 April 1997 (aged 25)	(Sweden) Frölunda HC
64	F	David Kämpf	1.88 m (6 ft 2 in)	85 kg (187 lb)	12 January 1995 (aged 27)	(Canada) Toronto Maple Leafs
67	F	Jiří Smejkal	1.89 m (6 ft 2 in)	83 kg (183 lb)	5 November 1996 (aged 25)	(Finland) Lahti Pelicans
84	D	Tomáš Kundrátek	1.88 m (6 ft 2 in)	94 kg (207 lb)	26 December 1989 (aged 32)	(Czech Republic) HC Oceláři Třinec
88	F	David Pastrňák	1.82 m (6 ft 0 in)	82 kg (181 lb)	25 May 1996 (aged 25)	(United States) Boston Bruins
91	F	Dominik Simon	1.80 m (5 ft 11 in)	80 kg (180 lb)	8 August 1994 (aged 27)	(United States) Anaheim Ducks
94	G	Marek Langhamer	1.87 m (6 ft 2 in)	85 kg (187 lb)	22 July 1994 (aged 27)	(Finland) Ilves
95	F	Matěj Blümel	1.80 m (5 ft 11 in)	81 kg (179 lb)	31 May 2000 (aged 21)	(Czech Republic) HC Dynamo Pardubice

=== Finland ===
A 26-player roster was announced on 8 May 2022.

Head coach: Jukka Jalonen

No.	Pos.	Name	Height	Weight	Birthdate	Team
2	D	Ville Pokka	1.83 m (6 ft 0 in)	90 kg (200 lb)	3 June 1994 (aged 27)	(Russia) Avangard Omsk
3	D	Niklas Friman	1.89 m (6 ft 2 in)	94 kg (207 lb)	30 August 1993 (aged 28)	(Finland) HPK
4	D	Mikko Lehtonen	1.83 m (6 ft 0 in)	89 kg (196 lb)	16 January 1994 (aged 28)	(Russia) SKA Saint Petersburg
10	F	Joel Armia	1.93 m (6 ft 4 in)	90 kg (200 lb)	31 May 1993 (aged 28)	(Canada) Montreal Canadiens
12	F	Marko Anttila – A	2.03 m (6 ft 8 in)	108 kg (238 lb)	27 May 1985 (aged 36)	(Finland) Ilves
21	F	Jere Innala	1.75 m (5 ft 9 in)	83 kg (183 lb)	17 March 1998 (aged 24)	(Finland) HIFK
23	D	Esa Lindell	1.91 m (6 ft 3 in)	94 kg (207 lb)	23 May 1994 (aged 27)	(United States) Dallas Stars
24	F	Hannes Björninen	1.85 m (6 ft 1 in)	89 kg (196 lb)	19 October 1995 (aged 26)	(Finland) Lahti Pelicans
25	F	Toni Rajala	1.79 m (5 ft 10 in)	76 kg (168 lb)	29 March 1991 (aged 31)	(Switzerland) EHC Biel
29	G	Harri Säteri	1.86 m (6 ft 1 in)	90 kg (200 lb)	29 December 1989 (aged 32)	(United States) Arizona Coyotes
35	G	Frans Tuohimaa	1.88 m (6 ft 2 in)	90 kg (200 lb)	19 August 1991 (aged 30)	(Russia) HC Neftekhimik Nizhnekamsk
38	D	Juuso Hietanen	1.78 m (5 ft 10 in)	83 kg (183 lb)	14 June 1985 (aged 36)	(Switzerland) HC Ambrì-Piotta
41	D	Miro Heiskanen	1.82 m (6 ft 0 in)	77 kg (170 lb)	18 July 1999 (aged 22)	(United States) Dallas Stars
42	D	Sami Vatanen	1.79 m (5 ft 10 in)	84 kg (185 lb)	3 June 1991 (aged 30)	(Switzerland) Genève-Servette HC
45	G	Juho Olkinuora	1.88 m (6 ft 2 in)	91 kg (201 lb)	4 November 1990 (aged 31)	(Russia) Metallurg Magnitogorsk
50	D	Mikael Seppälä	1.88 m (6 ft 2 in)	91 kg (201 lb)	8 March 1994 (aged 28)	(Finland) Tappara
51	F	Valtteri Filppula – C	1.82 m (6 ft 0 in)	86 kg (190 lb)	20 March 1984 (aged 38)	(Switzerland) Genève-Servette HC
55	D	Atte Ohtamaa	1.88 m (6 ft 2 in)	92 kg (203 lb)	6 November 1987 (aged 34)	(Finland) Oulun Kärpät
64	F	Mikael Granlund – A	1.79 m (5 ft 10 in)	84 kg (185 lb)	26 February 1992 (aged 30)	(United States) Nashville Predators
65	F	Sakari Manninen	1.70 m (5 ft 7 in)	71 kg (157 lb)	10 February 1992 (aged 30)	(Russia) Salavat Yulaev Ufa
70	F	Teemu Hartikainen	1.86 m (6 ft 1 in)	91 kg (201 lb)	3 May 1990 (aged 32)	(Russia) Salavat Yulaev Ufa
76	F	Jere Sallinen	1.88 m (6 ft 2 in)	91 kg (201 lb)	26 October 1990 (aged 31)	(Switzerland) EHC Biel
80	F	Saku Mäenalanen	1.92 m (6 ft 4 in)	94 kg (207 lb)	29 May 1994 (aged 27)	(Finland) Oulun Kärpät
82	F	Harri Pesonen	1.82 m (6 ft 0 in)	88 kg (194 lb)	6 August 1988 (aged 33)	(Switzerland) SCL Tigers
91	F	Juho Lammikko	1.90 m (6 ft 3 in)	91 kg (201 lb)	29 January 1996 (aged 26)	(Canada) Vancouver Canucks

=== Great Britain ===
The roster was announced on 22 April 2022.

Head coach: Peter Russell

No.	Pos.	Name	Height	Weight	Birthdate	Team
1	G	Jackson Whistle	1.85 m (6 ft 1 in)	87 kg (192 lb)	9 June 1995 (aged 26)	(United Kingdom) Belfast Giants
2	D	Dallas Ehrhardt	1.93 m (6 ft 4 in)	102 kg (225 lb)	31 July 1992 (aged 29)	(United Kingdom) Manchester Storm
5	F	Ben Davies	1.73 m (5 ft 8 in)	81 kg (179 lb)	18 January 1991 (aged 31)	(United Kingdom) Cardiff Devils
7	F	Robert Lachowicz	1.78 m (5 ft 10 in)	80 kg (180 lb)	8 February 1990 (aged 32)	(United Kingdom) Guildford Flames
8	F	Matthew Myers	1.88 m (6 ft 2 in)	93 kg (205 lb)	6 November 1984 (aged 37)	(United Kingdom) Nottingham Panthers
9	F	Brett Perlini	1.88 m (6 ft 2 in)	91 kg (201 lb)	14 June 1990 (aged 31)	(Norway) Ringerike Panthers
10	F	Scott Conway	1.83 m (6 ft 0 in)	86 kg (190 lb)	9 April 1995 (aged 27)	(United Kingdom) Belfast Giants
13	D	David Phillips	1.91 m (6 ft 3 in)	88 kg (194 lb)	14 August 1987 (aged 34)	(United Kingdom) Sheffield Steelers
16	F	Sam Duggan	1.85 m (6 ft 1 in)	90 kg (200 lb)	13 July 1998 (aged 23)	(United Kingdom) Cardiff Devils
17	D	Mark Richardson – A	1.83 m (6 ft 0 in)	88 kg (194 lb)	3 October 1986 (aged 35)	(United Kingdom) Cardiff Devils
18	F	Lewis Hook	1.83 m (6 ft 0 in)	80 kg (180 lb)	18 August 1996 (aged 25)	(United Kingdom) Belfast Giants
19	F	Luke Ferrara	1.80 m (5 ft 11 in)	89 kg (196 lb)	7 June 1993 (aged 28)	(United Kingdom) Coventry Blaze
20	F	Jonathan Phillips – C	1.81 m (5 ft 11 in)	82 kg (181 lb)	14 July 1982 (aged 39)	(United Kingdom) Sheffield Steelers
24	D	Josh Tetlow	1.98 m (6 ft 6 in)	103 kg (227 lb)	12 January 1998 (aged 24)	(United Kingdom) Nottingham Panthers
26	F	Evan Mosey	1.80 m (5 ft 11 in)	84 kg (185 lb)	17 March 1989 (aged 33)	(United Kingdom) Sheffield Steelers
28	D	Ben O'Connor	1.85 m (6 ft 1 in)	85 kg (187 lb)	21 December 1988 (aged 33)	(Romania) HSC Csíkszereda
33	G	Ben Bowns	1.83 m (6 ft 0 in)	81 kg (179 lb)	21 January 1991 (aged 31)	(Slovakia) HK Dukla Trenčín
34	G	Jordan Hedley	1.91 m (6 ft 3 in)	88 kg (194 lb)	7 August 1996 (aged 25)	(United Kingdom) Coventry Blaze
41	D	Josh Batch	1.93 m (6 ft 4 in)	100 kg (220 lb)	15 January 1991 (aged 31)	(United Kingdom) Cardiff Devils
44	D	Sam Jones	1.88 m (6 ft 2 in)	86 kg (190 lb)	11 November 1997 (aged 24)	(United Kingdom) Sheffield Steelers
58	D	David Clements	1.85 m (6 ft 1 in)	84 kg (185 lb)	20 September 1994 (aged 27)	(United Kingdom) Coventry Blaze
62	F	Joshua Waller	1.78 m (5 ft 10 in)	73 kg (161 lb)	2 June 1999 (aged 22)	(United Kingdom) Cardiff Devils
75	F	Robert Dowd – A	1.78 m (5 ft 10 in)	80 kg (180 lb)	26 May 1988 (aged 33)	(United Kingdom) Sheffield Steelers
91	F	Ben Lake	1.80 m (5 ft 11 in)	77 kg (170 lb)	31 May 1990 (aged 31)	(United Kingdom) Belfast Giants
94	F	Cade Neilson	1.83 m (6 ft 0 in)	88 kg (194 lb)	15 May 2001 (aged 20)	(United States) Aberdeen Wings

=== Latvia ===
A 26-player roster was announced on 29 April 2022.

Head coach: Harijs Vītoliņš

No.	Pos.	Name	Height	Weight	Birthdate	Team
2	D	Kārlis Čukste	1.88 m (6 ft 2 in)	98 kg (216 lb)	17 June 1997 (aged 24)	(Finland) Lahti Pelicans
9	F	Renārs Krastenbergs	1.83 m (6 ft 0 in)	84 kg (185 lb)	26 December 1998 (aged 23)	(Austria) EC VSV
11	D	Kristaps Sotnieks	1.83 m (6 ft 0 in)	94 kg (207 lb)	29 January 1987 (aged 35)	(Latvia) Dinamo Riga
12	F	Rihards Marenis	1.85 m (6 ft 1 in)	91 kg (201 lb)	18 April 1993 (aged 29)	(Sweden) HC Vita Hästen
13	F	Rihards Bukarts	1.80 m (5 ft 11 in)	84 kg (185 lb)	31 December 1995 (aged 26)	(Russia) Admiral Vladivostok
17	F	Mārtiņš Dzierkals	1.83 m (6 ft 0 in)	84 kg (185 lb)	4 April 1997 (aged 25)	(Czech Republic) HC Škoda Plzeň
18	F	Rodrigo Ābols – C	1.93 m (6 ft 4 in)	93 kg (205 lb)	5 January 1996 (aged 26)	(Sweden) Örebro HK
21	F	Rūdolfs Balcers – A	1.80 m (5 ft 11 in)	79 kg (174 lb)	8 April 1997 (aged 25)	(United States) San Jose Sharks
25	F	Andris Džeriņš	1.86 m (6 ft 1 in)	87 kg (192 lb)	14 February 1988 (aged 34)	(Austria) Steinbach Black Wings Linz
31	G	Artūrs Šilovs	1.93 m (6 ft 4 in)	88 kg (194 lb)	22 March 2001 (aged 21)	(Canada) Abbotsford Canucks
32	D	Artūrs Kulda – A	1.88 m (6 ft 2 in)	96 kg (212 lb)	25 July 1988 (aged 33)	(Germany) Krefeld Pinguine
55	D	Roberts Mamčics	1.96 m (6 ft 5 in)	105 kg (231 lb)	6 April 1995 (aged 27)	(Sweden) Linköping HC
65	D	Arvils Bergmanis	1.81 m (5 ft 11 in)	79 kg (174 lb)	29 December 1999 (aged 22)	(United States) Alaska Nanooks
69	F	Nikolajs Jeļisejevs	1.80 m (5 ft 11 in)	82 kg (181 lb)	7 July 1994 (aged 27)	(Sweden) MoDo Hockey
71	F	Roberts Bukarts	1.82 m (6 ft 0 in)	84 kg (185 lb)	27 June 1990 (aged 31)	(Czech Republic) HC Vítkovice Ridera
72	D	Jānis Jaks	1.83 m (6 ft 0 in)	86 kg (190 lb)	22 August 1995 (aged 26)	(Russia) HC Sochi
73	F	Deniss Smirnovs	1.77 m (5 ft 10 in)	80 kg (180 lb)	7 March 1999 (aged 23)	(Switzerland) Genève-Servette HC
77	D	Kristaps Zīle	1.85 m (6 ft 1 in)	86 kg (190 lb)	24 December 1997 (aged 24)	(Sweden) Örebro HK
80	G	Elvis Merzļikins	1.91 m (6 ft 3 in)	87 kg (192 lb)	13 April 1994 (aged 28)	(United States) Columbus Blue Jackets
83	F	Klavs Veinbergs	1.91 m (6 ft 3 in)	90 kg (200 lb)	27 March 2003 (aged 19)	(Latvia) HK Zemgale/LLU
88	G	Gustavs Grigals	1.88 m (6 ft 2 in)	89 kg (196 lb)	22 July 1998 (aged 23)	(United States) Alaska Nanooks
90	D	Sandis Smons	1.78 m (5 ft 10 in)	84 kg (185 lb)	19 May 1999 (aged 22)	(Switzerland) Genève-Servette HC
91	F	Ronalds Ķēniņš	1.82 m (6 ft 0 in)	91 kg (201 lb)	28 February 1991 (aged 31)	(Switzerland) Lausanne HC
94	D	Kristiāns Rubīns	1.94 m (6 ft 4 in)	96 kg (212 lb)	11 December 1997 (aged 24)	(Canada) Toronto Marlies
95	F	Oskars Batņa	1.95 m (6 ft 5 in)	106 kg (234 lb)	7 May 1995 (aged 27)	(Finland) Mikkelin Jukurit

=== Norway ===
The roster was announced on 11 May 2022.

Head coach: Petter Thoresen

No.	Pos.	Name	Height	Weight	Birthdate	Team
4	D	Johannes Johannesen – A	1.81 m (5 ft 11 in)	85 kg (187 lb)	1 March 1997 (aged 25)	(Sweden) Västerviks IK
5	D	Andreas Klavestad	1.85 m (6 ft 1 in)	86 kg (190 lb)	29 November 1995 (aged 26)	(Norway) Stavanger Oilers
8	F	Mathias Trettenes – A	1.80 m (5 ft 11 in)	82 kg (181 lb)	8 November 1993 (aged 28)	(Switzerland) EHC Biel
10	D	Mattias Nørstebø	1.78 m (5 ft 10 in)	82 kg (181 lb)	3 June 1995 (aged 26)	(Sweden) IF Björklöven
11	F	Kristian Jakobsson	1.76 m (5 ft 9 in)	84 kg (185 lb)	18 January 1996 (aged 26)	(Norway) Sparta Warriors
12	D	Daniel Rokseth	1.83 m (6 ft 0 in)	85 kg (187 lb)	15 August 1991 (aged 30)	(Norway) Stavanger Oilers
16	F	Magnus Brekke Henriksen	1.90 m (6 ft 3 in)	85 kg (187 lb)	17 April 1996 (aged 26)	(Norway) Vålerenga Ishockey
19	F	Eirik Salsten	1.84 m (6 ft 0 in)	85 kg (187 lb)	17 June 1994 (aged 27)	(Norway) Storhamar Ishockey
20	F	Ludvig Hoff	1.80 m (5 ft 11 in)	85 kg (187 lb)	16 October 1996 (aged 25)	(Norway) Stavanger Oilers
21	D	Christian Bull	1.87 m (6 ft 2 in)	87 kg (192 lb)	13 August 1996 (aged 25)	(Slovakia) HC Nové Zámky
22	F	Martin Røymark	1.84 m (6 ft 0 in)	86 kg (190 lb)	10 November 1986 (aged 35)	(Norway) Vålerenga Ishockey
23	F	Martin Rønnild	1.85 m (6 ft 1 in)	90 kg (200 lb)	24 January 1996 (aged 26)	(Norway) Storhamar Ishockey
27	F	Andreas Martinsen	1.90 m (6 ft 3 in)	100 kg (220 lb)	13 June 1990 (aged 31)	(Norway) Lillehammer IK
28	F	Magnus Geheb	1.82 m (6 ft 0 in)	86 kg (190 lb)	20 August 1998 (aged 23)	(Norway) Frisk Asker Ishockey
31	G	Jonas Arntzen	1.91 m (6 ft 3 in)	85 kg (187 lb)	21 November 1997 (aged 24)	(Sweden) Örebro HK
33	G	Henrik Haukeland	1.86 m (6 ft 1 in)	83 kg (183 lb)	6 December 1994 (aged 27)	(Germany) EHC Red Bull München
38	G	Henrik Holm	1.85 m (6 ft 1 in)	83 kg (183 lb)	6 September 1990 (aged 31)	(Norway) Stavanger Oilers
40	F	Ken André Olimb	1.79 m (5 ft 10 in)	81 kg (179 lb)	21 January 1989 (aged 33)	(Germany) Schwenninger Wild Wings
43	D	Max Krogdahl	1.87 m (6 ft 2 in)	95 kg (209 lb)	21 October 1998 (aged 23)	(Sweden) Västerviks IK
46	F	Mathis Olimb – C	1.77 m (5 ft 10 in)	80 kg (180 lb)	1 February 1986 (aged 36)	(Norway) Vålerenga Ishockey
49	D	Christian Kåsastul	1.76 m (5 ft 9 in)	86 kg (190 lb)	9 April 1997 (aged 25)	(United States) Ontario Reign
51	F	Mats Rosseli Olsen	1.80 m (5 ft 11 in)	82 kg (181 lb)	29 April 1991 (aged 31)	(Sweden) Frölunda HC
76	D	Emil Lilleberg	1.88 m (6 ft 2 in)	94 kg (207 lb)	2 February 2001 (aged 21)	(Sweden) IK Oskarshamn
85	F	Michael Haga	1.80 m (5 ft 11 in)	80 kg (180 lb)	10 March 1992 (aged 30)	(Finland) Lukko
96	F	Tobias Fladeby	1.85 m (6 ft 1 in)	87 kg (192 lb)	20 May 1996 (aged 25)	(Sweden) Tingsryds AIF

=== Sweden ===
The roster was announced on 11 May 2022.

Head coach: Johan Garpenlöv

No.	Pos.	Name	Height	Weight	Birthdate	Team
6	D	Adam Larsson – A	1.89 m (6 ft 2 in)	94 kg (207 lb)	12 November 1992 (aged 29)	(United States) Seattle Kraken
7	D	Henrik Tömmernes	1.86 m (6 ft 1 in)	84 kg (185 lb)	28 August 1990 (aged 31)	(Switzerland) Genève-Servette HC
8	D	Marcus Pettersson	1.94 m (6 ft 4 in)	80 kg (180 lb)	8 May 1996 (aged 26)	(United States) Pittsburgh Penguins
12	F	Max Friberg	1.79 m (5 ft 10 in)	86 kg (190 lb)	20 November 1992 (aged 29)	(Sweden) Frölunda HC
17	F	Oskar Lang	1.70 m (5 ft 7 in)	75 kg (165 lb)	4 December 1996 (aged 25)	(Sweden) Leksands IF
23	D	Oliver Ekman-Larsson – C	1.87 m (6 ft 2 in)	92 kg (203 lb)	17 July 1991 (aged 30)	(Canada) Vancouver Canucks
26	D	Rasmus Dahlin	1.90 m (6 ft 3 in)	94 kg (207 lb)	13 April 2000 (aged 22)	(United States) Buffalo Sabres
28	F	Anton Bengtsson	1.86 m (6 ft 1 in)	88 kg (194 lb)	13 May 1993 (aged 29)	(Sweden) Rögle BK
32	F	Lucas Wallmark	1.83 m (6 ft 0 in)	83 kg (183 lb)	5 September 1995 (aged 26)	(Russia) CSKA Moscow
35	G	Linus Ullmark	1.93 m (6 ft 4 in)	88 kg (194 lb)	31 July 1993 (aged 28)	(United States) Boston Bruins
40	F	Jacob Peterson	1.86 m (6 ft 1 in)	82 kg (181 lb)	19 July 1999 (aged 22)	(United States) Dallas Stars
42	F	Joakim Nordström – A	1.88 m (6 ft 2 in)	93 kg (205 lb)	25 February 1992 (aged 30)	(Russia) CSKA Moscow
45	G	Magnus Hellberg	1.97 m (6 ft 6 in)	85 kg (187 lb)	4 April 1991 (aged 31)	(United States) Detroit Red Wings
48	F	Carl Klingberg	1.91 m (6 ft 3 in)	102 kg (225 lb)	28 January 1991 (aged 31)	(Switzerland) EV Zug
54	D	Anton Lindholm	1.81 m (5 ft 11 in)	90 kg (200 lb)	29 November 1994 (aged 27)	(Belarus) Dinamo Minsk
56	D	Erik Gustafsson	1.85 m (6 ft 1 in)	90 kg (200 lb)	14 March 1992 (aged 30)	(United States) Chicago Blackhawks
62	F	Joel Kellman	1.79 m (5 ft 10 in)	85 kg (187 lb)	25 May 1994 (aged 27)	(Sweden) Växjö Lakers HC
63	G	Marcus Högberg	1.96 m (6 ft 5 in)	99 kg (218 lb)	25 November 1994 (aged 27)	(Sweden) Linköping HC
64	D	Jonathan Pudas	1.79 m (5 ft 10 in)	81 kg (179 lb)	26 April 1993 (aged 29)	(Sweden) Skellefteå AIK
66	F	Nils Åman	1.89 m (6 ft 2 in)	84 kg (185 lb)	7 February 2000 (aged 22)	(Sweden) Leksands IF
72	F	Emil Bemström	1.82 m (6 ft 0 in)	90 kg (200 lb)	1 June 1999 (aged 22)	(United States) Columbus Blue Jackets
74	F	Rasmus Asplund	1.80 m (5 ft 11 in)	86 kg (190 lb)	3 December 1997 (aged 24)	(United States) Buffalo Sabres
86	F	Mathias Bromé	1.82 m (6 ft 0 in)	82 kg (181 lb)	29 July 1994 (aged 27)	(Switzerland) HC Davos
88	F	William Nylander	1.83 m (6 ft 0 in)	86 kg (190 lb)	1 May 1996 (aged 26)	(Canada) Toronto Maple Leafs
91	F	Carl Grundström	1.84 m (6 ft 0 in)	91 kg (201 lb)	1 December 1997 (aged 24)	(United States) Los Angeles Kings

=== United States ===
A 24-player roster was announced on 5 May 2022.

Head coach: David Quinn

No.	Pos.	Name	Height	Weight	Birthdate	Team
1	G	Jeremy Swayman	1.91 m (6 ft 3 in)	91 kg (201 lb)	24 November 1998 (aged 23)	(United States) Boston Bruins
2	D	Andrew Peeke	1.91 m (6 ft 3 in)	93 kg (205 lb)	17 March 1998 (aged 24)	(United States) Columbus Blue Jackets
4	D	Seth Jones – C	1.93 m (6 ft 4 in)	100 kg (220 lb)	3 October 1994 (aged 27)	(United States) Chicago Blackhawks
5	D	Jon Merrill	1.91 m (6 ft 3 in)	93 kg (205 lb)	3 February 1992 (aged 30)	(United States) Minnesota Wild
7	D	Nick Blankenburg	1.75 m (5 ft 9 in)	79 kg (174 lb)	12 May 1998 (aged 24)	(United States) Columbus Blue Jackets
11	F	Riley Barber	1.83 m (6 ft 0 in)	93 kg (205 lb)	7 February 1994 (aged 28)	(United States) Grand Rapids Griffins
12	F	Matthew Boldy	1.88 m (6 ft 2 in)	91 kg (201 lb)	5 April 2001 (aged 21)	(United States) Minnesota Wild
14	F	T. J. Tynan	1.73 m (5 ft 8 in)	75 kg (165 lb)	25 February 1992 (aged 30)	(United States) Ontario Reign
15	F	John Hayden	1.91 m (6 ft 3 in)	101 kg (223 lb)	14 February 1995 (aged 26)	(United States) Buffalo Sabres
16	F	Austin Watson – A	1.93 m (6 ft 4 in)	93 kg (205 lb)	13 January 1992 (aged 30)	(Canada) Ottawa Senators
17	F	Adam Gaudette	1.85 m (6 ft 1 in)	77 kg (170 lb)	3 October 1996 (aged 25)	(Canada) Ottawa Senators
22	F	Kieffer Bellows	1.85 m (6 ft 1 in)	88 kg (194 lb)	10 June 1998 (aged 23)	(United States) New York Islanders
24	F	Sam Lafferty	1.85 m (6 ft 1 in)	88 kg (194 lb)	6 March 1995 (aged 27)	(United States) Chicago Blackhawks
25	F	Karson Kuhlman	1.78 m (5 ft 10 in)	86 kg (190 lb)	26 September 1995 (aged 26)	(United States) Seattle Kraken
26	F	Sean Farrell	1.75 m (5 ft 9 in)	79 kg (174 lb)	2 November 2001 (aged 20)	(United States) Harvard Crimson
27	F	Alex Galchenyuk	1.85 m (6 ft 1 in)	88 kg (194 lb)	12 February 1994 (aged 28)	(United States) Arizona Coyotes
28	F	Vinni Lettieri	1.80 m (5 ft 11 in)	84 kg (185 lb)	6 February 1995 (aged 27)	(United States) Anaheim Ducks
31	G	Strauss Mann	1.83 m (6 ft 0 in)	79 kg (174 lb)	18 August 1998 (aged 23)	(Sweden) Skellefteå AIK
32	G	Jon Gillies	1.97 m (6 ft 6 in)	101 kg (223 lb)	22 January 1994 (aged 28)	(United States) New Jersey Devils
34	F	Thomas Bordeleau	1.78 m (5 ft 10 in)	79 kg (174 lb)	3 January 2002 (aged 20)	(United States) San Jose Sharks
38	F	Ryan Hartman	1.83 m (6 ft 0 in)	87 kg (192 lb)	20 September 1994 (aged 27)	(United States) Minnesota Wild
43	D	Luke Hughes	1.88 m (6 ft 2 in)	83 kg (183 lb)	9 September 2003 (aged 18)	(United States) Michigan Wolverines
44	D	Jaycob Megna	1.98 m (6 ft 6 in)	100 kg (220 lb)	10 December 1992 (aged 29)	(United States) San Jose Sharks
59	F	Ben Meyers	1.80 m (5 ft 11 in)	91 kg (201 lb)	15 November 1998 (aged 23)	(United States) Colorado Avalanche
88	D	Nate Schmidt – A	1.83 m (6 ft 0 in)	88 kg (194 lb)	16 July 1991 (aged 30)	(Canada) Winnipeg Jets
