= 2024 IIHF World Championship Division I =

Ice hockey world championships

Tournament details
- Host countries: Italy; Lithuania
- Venues: 2 (in 2 host cities)
- Dates: 28 April – 4 May; 27 April – 3 May
- Teams: 12

The 2024 IIHF World Championship Division I was an international ice hockey tournament run by the International Ice Hockey Federation.

The Group A tournament was held in Bolzano, Italy from 28 April to 4 May and the Group B tournament in Vilnius, Lithuania from 27 April to 3 May 2024.

In Group A, Hungary and Slovenia gained promotion to the Top Division and South Korea was relegated. Ukraine won Group B and was promoted, while the Netherlands were relegated to Division II.

== Group A tournament ==
2024 IIHF World Championship Division I A

Tournament details
- Host country: Italy
- Venue: 1 (in 1 host city)
- Dates: 28 April – 4 May
- Teams: 6

Tournament statistics
- Games played: 15
- Goals scored: 83 (5.53 per game)
- Attendance: 35,330 (2,355 per game)
- Scoring leader: (Hungary) János Hári (6 points)

Official website
- Website

=== Participants ===
Team	Qualification
Hungary	Placed 15th in the Elite Division in 2023 and was relegated.
Slovenia	Placed 16th in the Elite Division in 2023 and was relegated.
Italy	Host, placed 3rd in Division I A in 2023.
South Korea	Placed 4th in Division I A in 2023.
Romania	Placed 5th in Division I A in 2023.
Japan	Placed 1st in Division I B in 2023 and was promoted.

=== Match officials ===
Eight referees and seven linesmen were selected for the tournament.

Referees	Linesmen
(Canada) Mike Langin; (Denmark) Mads Frandsen; (France) Geoffrey Barcelo; (Germany) Benjamin Hoppe; (Latvia) Uldis Bušs; (Slovenia) Milan Zrnić; (Slovakia) Peter Staňo; (United States) Sean Fernandez	(Finland) Tommi Niittylä; (France) Clément Goncalves; (Germany) Patrick Laguzov; (United Kingdom) Daniel Beresford; (Italy) Davide Mantovani; (Norway) Knut Bråten; (Slovenia) Gašper Zgonc

=== Standings ===
Pos	Team	Pld	W	OTW	OTL	L	GF	GA	GD	Pts	Promotion or relegation
1	Hungary	5	3	1	0	1	15	8	+7	11	Promoted to the 2025 Top Division
2	Slovenia	5	3	0	0	2	14	8	+6	9 (Note: Head-to-head points: Slovenia 6 Pts, Italy 3 Pts, Romania 0 Pts.)	Promoted to the 2025 Top Division
3	Italy (H)	5	2	1	1	1	20	10	+10	9	
4	Romania	5	3	0	0	2	11	17	−6	9	
5	Japan	5	1	0	1	3	11	17	−6	4	
6	South Korea	5	1	0	0	4	12	23	−11	3	Relegated to the 2025 Division I B

Source: IIHF
Rules for classification: 1) points; 2) head-to-head points; 3) head-to-head goal difference; 4) head-to-head number of goals scored; 5) result against closest best-ranked team outside tied teams; 6) result against second-best ranked team outside tied teams; 7) seeding before tournament.
(H) Host

=== Results ===
All times are local (UTC+2).

28 April 2024; 12:30	South Korea	4–2 (2–1, 0–1, 2–0)	Slovenia	Sparkasse Arena, Bolzano; Attendance: 1,083

Game reference

Lee Yeon-seung
Goalies
Matija Pintarič
Referees:
(United States) Sean Fernandez
(Canada) Mike Langin
Linesmen:
(Norway) Knut Bråten
(Germany) Patrick Laguzov

	0–1	03:34 – Sabolič (Tomaževič, Čepon)
Kong (Kim Sang-w., Lee D.) – 15:43	1–1
Shin (Ahn, Lee Y.) – 16:48	2–1
	2–2	22:25 – Sodja (Beričič, Magovac)
Lee C. (Nam, Lee Y.) (PP) – 48:17	3–2
Kim Sang-y. (Kim Si.) – 55:15	4–2

2 min
Penalties
4 min
25
Shots
32

28 April 2024; 16:00	Japan	1–3 (0–1, 0–0, 1–2)	Hungary	Sparkasse Arena, Bolzano; Attendance: 2,052

Game reference

Yuta Narisawa
Goalies
Bence Bálizs
Referees:
(Latvia) Uldis Bušs
(Denmark) Mads Frandsen
Linesmen:
(United Kingdom) Daniel Beresford
(Slovenia) Gašper Zgonc

	0–1	07:57 – Varga (Szabó, Hári)
	0–2	41:58 – Terbócs (Németh, Ortenszky)
T. Nakajima (Hitosato, Yoneyama) (PP) – 46:52	1–2
	1–3	59:12 – Hári (Galló, Nilsson) (EN)

6 min
Penalties
10 min
31
Shots
19

28 April 2024; 19:30	Romania	1–6 (0–2, 1–2, 0–2)	Italy	Sparkasse Arena, Bolzano; Attendance: 3,011

Game reference

Zoltán Tőke
Goalies
Andreas Bernard
Referees:
(France) Geoffrey Barcelo
(Germany) Benjamin Hoppe
Linesmen:
(France) Clément Goncalves
(Finland) Tommi Niittylä

	0–1	17:03 – Salinitri (Trivellato, Seed)
	0–2	19:46 – Catenacci (Salinitri, Pietroniro)
Részegh (SH) – 26:15	1–2
	1–3	35:27 – Frank
	1–4	38:50 – Salinitri (Frigo) (PP)
	1–5	47:44 – Marchetti
	1–6	51:27 – Kostner (Marchetti, Spornberger)

8 min
Penalties
2 min
20
Shots
55

30 April 2024; 12:30	Slovenia	6–1 (1–1, 3–0, 2–0)	Romania	Sparkasse Arena, Bolzano; Attendance: 1,304

Game reference

Gašper Krošelj
Goalies
Attila Adorján
Referees:
(Latvia) Uldis Bušs
(Slovakia) Peter Staňo
Linesmen:
(Norway) Knut Bråten
(Italy) Davide Mantovani

	0–1	03:40 – Zagidullin (Salló, Bors)
Bohinc (Tomaževič, Macuh) – 15:43	1–1
Tičar (Sabolič) – 20:39	2–1
Török (Sabolič, Podlipnik) (PP) – 36:36	3–1
Mahkovec (Podlipnik, Beričič) – 37:47	4–1
Mahkovec (Crnovič, Ćosić) – 46:35	5–1
Tičar (Sabolič, Podlipnik) (PP) – 48:08	6–1

10 min
Penalties
12 min
47
Shots
10

30 April 2024; 16:00	Hungary	6–2 (2–1, 4–0, 0–1)	South Korea	Sparkasse Arena, Bolzano; Attendance: 1,450

Game reference

Bence Bálizs
Goalies
Ha Jung-ho
Lee Yeon-seung
Referees:
(Denmark) Mads Frandsen
(Slovenia) Milan Zrnić
Linesmen:
(Germany) Patrick Laguzov
(Finland) Tommi Niittylä

	0–1	01:28 – Lee Y. (Shin, Lee S.)
Erdély (Papp, Kiss) – 13:35	1–1
Sofron (Varga, Szabó) – 16:40	2–1
Stipsicz (Sofron, Hári) (PP) – 24:25	3–1
Sebők (Nilsson, Szabó) – 27:31	4–1
Mihály (Ortenszky, Terbócs) – 28:07	5–1
Erdély (Papp, Sebők) – 30:13	6–1
	6–2	48:31 – Shin (Kim Si., Kim Sang-w.) (PP)

31 min
Penalties
35 min
31
Shots
33

30 April 2024; 19:30	Italy	4–3 OT (0–0, 2–2, 1–1) (OT: 1–0)	Japan	Sparkasse Arena, Bolzano; Attendance: 3,437

Game reference

Damian Clara
Goalies
Yuta Narisawa
Referees:
(France) Geoffrey Barcelo
(United States) Sean Fernandez
Linesmen:
(United Kingdom) Daniel Beresford
(France) Clément Goncalves

Gazley (Catenacci, Salinitri) – 15:43	1–0
Kostner (De Luca, Gazley) – 29:48	2–0
	2–1	31:19 – Y. Sato (T. Nakajima, Hanzawa)
	2–2	34:38 – K. Sato (Irikura, Isogai)
	2–3	52:55 – Yoneyama (Irikura, Isogai)
Larkin (Spornberger, Marchetti) – 56:19	3–3
Frigo (Mantenuto) – 60:05	4–3

6 min
Penalties
8 min
35
Shots
19

1 May 2024; 12:30	Hungary	1–2 (0–0, 0–0, 1–2)	Romania	Sparkasse Arena, Bolzano; Attendance: 2,212

Game reference

Bence Bálizs
Goalies
Zoltán Tőke
Referees:
(Germany) Benjamin Hoppe
(Slovenia) Milan Zrnić
Linesmen:
(Italy) Davide Mantovani
(Slovenia) Gašper Zgonc

	0–1	49:29 – Péter
Hári (Hadobás, Stipsicz) – 55:40	1–1
	1–2	59:09 – Sándor-Székely (Gliga, Ferencz-Csibi)

2 min
Penalties
4 min
32
Shots
19

1 May 2024; 16:00	Japan	4–3 (0–1, 2–1, 2–1)	South Korea	Sparkasse Arena, Bolzano; Attendance: 1,738

Game reference

Yutaka Fukufuji
Goalies
Lee Yeon-seung
Referees:
(France) Geoffrey Barcelo
(Canada) Mike Langin
Linesmen:
(Norway) Knut Bråten
(Finland) Tommi Niittylä

	0–1	15:25 – Jee (Kang, Lee C.)
Lawlor (Y. Sato, T. Nakajima) – 21:42	1–1
	1–2	26:56 – Lee C. (Kang, Kim Sang-w.)
Isogai (Y. Otsu) – 36:59	2–2
	2–3	40:14 – Lee D. (Lee C., Kim Sang-w.)
Y. Sato (T. Nakajima) – 51:40	3–3
Isogai (K. Sato, Lawlor) – 53:03	4–3

4 min
Penalties
4 min
31
Shots
46

1 May 2024; 19:30	Slovenia	2–0 (1–0, 0–0, 1–0)	Italy	Sparkasse Arena, Bolzano; Attendance: 4,238

Game reference
Gašper Krošelj	Goalies	Damian Clara	Referees: (Denmark) Mads Frandsen (Slovakia) Peter Staňo; Linesmen: (United Kingdom) Daniel Beresford (Germany) Patrick Laguzov
Tičar (Crnovič, Bohinc) – 15:52 / 1–0; Kuralt (Tomaževič, Mašič) – 44:08 / 2–0			Referees: (Denmark) Mads Frandsen (Slovakia) Peter Staňo; Linesmen: (United Kingdom) Daniel Beresford (Germany) Patrick Laguzov
6 min	Penalties	2 min	Referees: (Denmark) Mads Frandsen (Slovakia) Peter Staňo; Linesmen: (United Kingdom) Daniel Beresford (Germany) Patrick Laguzov
25	Shots	30	Referees: (Denmark) Mads Frandsen (Slovakia) Peter Staňo; Linesmen: (United Kingdom) Daniel Beresford (Germany) Patrick Laguzov

3 May 2024; 12:30	South Korea	2–3 (0–1, 0–1, 2–1)	Romania	Sparkasse Arena, Bolzano; Attendance: 252

Game reference

Lee Yeon-seung
Goalies
Zoltán Tőke
Referees:
(Germany) Benjamin Hoppe
(Slovenia) Milan Zrnić
Linesmen:
(France) Clément Goncalves
(Germany) Patrick Laguzov

	0–1	14:38 – Gliga
	0–2	38:01 – Sándor-Székely
Shin (Lee Y.) – 43:02	1–2
Ahn (Lee Y., Nam) (PP) – 53:58	2–2
	2–3	55:31 – Péter (Részegh) (SH)

2 min
Penalties
8 min
14
Shots
28

3 May 2024; 16:00	Slovenia	3–1 (2–0, 0–1, 1–0)	Japan	Sparkasse Arena, Bolzano; Attendance: 1,750

Game reference

Gašper Krošelj
Goalies
Yuta Narisawa
Referees:
(Latvia) Uldis Bušs
(United States) Sean Fernandez
Linesmen:
(Italy) Davide Mantovani
(Finland) Tommi Niittylä

Mehle (Sodja) – 03:43	1–0
Simšič (Drozg) – 12:40	2–0
	2–1	30:39 – S. Nakajima (K. Otsu, Yoneyama)
Drozg (Macuh, Török) (PP) – 59:32	3–1

6 min
Penalties
8 min
31
Shots
31

3 May 2024; 19:30	Italy	2–3 OT (0–0, 1–1, 1–1) (OT: 0–1)	Hungary	Sparkasse Arena, Bolzano; Attendance: 5,394

Game reference

Damian Clara
Goalies
Bence Bálizs
Referees:
(Canada) Mike Langin
(Slovakia) Peter Staňo
Linesmen:
(Norway) Knut Bråten
(Slovenia) Gašper Zgonc

	0–1	30:27 – Sofron (Varga)
Pietroniro (Trivellato, De Luca) (PP) – 38:56	1–1
	1–2	42:35 – Mihály (Ortenszky)
Frank (Mantenuto, Frigo) – 43:48	2–2
	2–3	63:54 – Varga (Hári, Stipsicz)

10 min
Penalties
16 min
41
Shots
21

4 May 2024; 12:30	Romania	4–2 (2–1, 1–0, 1–1)	Japan	Sparkasse Arena, Bolzano; Attendance: 1,015

Game reference

Zoltán Tőke
Goalies
Yuta Narisawa
Referees:
(France) Geoffrey Barcelo
(United States) Sean Fernandez
Linesmen:
(Italy) Davide Mantovani
(Slovenia) Gašper Zgonc

Gliga (Skachkov, Zagidullin) – 04:26	1–0
	1–1	18:17 – Isogai
Skachkov (Bors) – 18:35	2–1
Rokaly (Részegh, Péter) – 34:15	3–1
	3–2	56:21 – Y. Sato (Hanzawa, Yamada)
Haaranen (Gliga) (EN) – 59:03	4–2

4 min
Penalties
4 min
18
Shots
30

4 May 2024; 16:00	Italy	8–1 (4–0, 0–1, 4–0)	South Korea	Sparkasse Arena, Bolzano; Attendance: 4,225

Game reference

Damian Clara
Goalies
Ha Jung-ho
Referees:
(Latvia) Uldis Bušs
(Slovakia) Peter Staňo
Linesmen:
(United Kingdom) Daniel Beresford
(France) Clément Goncalves

Frigo (Frank, Trivellato) – 00:21	1–0
Mantenuto (Frank, Frigo) – 06:27	2–0
Kostner (Marchetti, Pietroniro) (PP) – 13:21	3–0
Frank (Mantenuto, Larkin) – 19:51	4–0
	4–1	21:10 – Shin (Nam, Ahn)
Catenacci (Larkin, Gazley) (PP) – 41:10	5–1
Mantenuto (PP) – 43:05	6–1
Salinitri (Larkin, Catenacci) (PP) – 43:31	7–1
Marchetti (Kostner, Trivellato) (PP) – 44:00	8–1

10 min
Penalties
29 min
43
Shots
29

4 May 2024; 19:30	Hungary	2–1 (1–0, 0–1, 1–0)	Slovenia	Sparkasse Arena, Bolzano; Attendance: 2,169

Game reference

Bence Bálizs
Goalies
Gašper Krošelj
Referees:
(Denmark) Mads Frandsen
(Canada) Mike Langin
Linesmen:
(Germany) Patrick Laguzov
(Finland) Tommi Niittylä

Hári (Terbócs, Mihály) – 07:09	1–0
	1–1	25:38 – Tičar (Sabolič, Török)
Papp (Varga, Nilsson) (PP) – 57:09	2–1

6 min
Penalties
8 min
29
Shots
36

=== Statistics ===
==== Scoring leaders ====
List shows the top skaters sorted by points, then goals.

Player	GP	G	A	Pts	+/−	PIM	POS
(Hungary) János Hári	5	3	3	6	+5	2	F
(South Korea) Shin Sang-hoon	5	4	1	5	+1	6	F
(Italy) Daniel Frank	5	3	2	5	+5	2	F
(Japan) Sota Isogai	5	3	2	5	+3	0	F
(Italy) Anthony Salinitri	5	3	2	5	−1	0	F
(Italy) Luca Frigo	5	2	3	5	+5	2	F
(Italy) Daniel Mantenuto	5	2	3	5	+6	4	F
(Italy) Michele Marchetti	4	2	3	5	+2	0	F
(Hungary) Balázs Varga	5	2	3	5	+3	6	F
(South Korea) Lee Young-jun	5	1	4	5	−3	0	F
(Slovenia) Robert Sabolič	5	1	4	5	+1	0	F

GP = Games played; G = Goals; A = Assists; Pts = Points; +/− = Plus/Minus; PIM = Penalties in Minutes; POS = Position
Source: IIHF.com

==== Goaltending leaders ====
Only the top five goaltenders, based on save percentage, who have played at least 40% of their team's minutes, are included in this list.

Player	TOI	GA	GAA	SA	Sv%	SO
(Slovenia) Gašper Krošelj	238:20	4	1.01	100	96.00	1
(Hungary) Bence Bálizs	303:09	8	1.58	160	95.00	0
(Romania) Zoltán Tőke	240:00	11	2.75	147	92.52	0
(Italy) Damian Clara	241:12	9	2.24	94	90.43	0
(South Korea) Lee Yeon-seung	209:05	10	2.87	93	89.25	0

TOI = time on ice (minutes:seconds); SA = shots against; GA = goals against; GAA = goals against average; Sv% = save percentage; SO = shutouts
Source: IIHF.com

=== Awards ===
Position	Player
Goaltender	(Slovenia) Gašper Krošelj
Defenceman	(Italy) Thomas Larkin
Forward	(Slovenia) Rok Tičar

== Group B tournament ==
2024 IIHF World Championship Division I B

Tournament details
- Host country: Lithuania
- City: Vilnius
- Venue: 1 (in 1 host city)
- Dates: 27 April – 3 May
- Teams: 6

Tournament statistics
- Games played: 15
- Goals scored: 79 (5.27 per game)
- Attendance: 16,654 (1,110 per game)
- Scoring leader: (Ukraine) Olexander Peresunko (11 points)

Official website
- Website

=== Participants ===
Team	Qualification
Lithuania	Host, placed 6th in Division I A in 2023 and was relegated.
Ukraine	Placed 2nd in Division I B in 2023.
China	Placed 3rd in Division I B in 2023.
Estonia	Placed 4th in Division I B in 2023.
Netherlands	Placed 5th in Division I B in 2023.
Spain	Placed 1st in Division II A in 2023 and was promoted.

=== Match officials ===
Eight referees and seven linesmen were selected for the tournament.

Referees	Linesmen
(Canada) Adam Bloski; (Croatia) Trpimir Piragić; (Denmark) Rasmus Ankersen; (Germany) Bastian Steingross; (Kazakhstan) Anton Boryayev; (Norway) Roy Hansen; (Sweden) Richard Magnusson; (United States) Nolan Bloyer	(Belgium) Frédéric Monnaie; (Canada) Shawn Oliver; (Hungary) Norbert Muzsik; (Latvia) Agris Ozoliņš; (Lithuania) Aleksej Sascenkov; (Sweden) Gustav Jönsson; (United States) John Rey

=== Standings ===
Pos	Team	Pld	W	OTW	OTL	L	GF	GA	GD	Pts	Promotion or relegation
1	Ukraine	5	5	0	0	0	31	2	+29	15	Promoted to the 2025 Division I A
2	Lithuania (H)	5	4	0	0	1	16	7	+9	12	
3	Estonia	5	2	1	0	2	11	20	−9	8	
4	China	5	2	0	0	3	11	16	−5	6	
5	Spain	5	1	0	1	3	6	20	−14	4	
6	Netherlands	5	0	0	0	5	4	14	−10	0	Relegated to the 2025 Division II A

Source: IIHF
Rules for classification: 1) points; 2) head-to-head points; 3) head-to-head goal difference; 4) head-to-head number of goals scored; 5) result against closest best-ranked team outside tied teams; 6) result against second-best ranked team outside tied teams; 7) seeding before tournament.
(H) Host

=== Results ===
All times are local (UTC+3).

27 April 2024; 12:30	Netherlands	0–3 (0–0, 0–1, 0–2)	China	Twinsbet Arena, Vilnius; Attendance: 212

Game reference

Ruud Leeuwesteijn
Goalies
Chen Shifeng
Referees:
(Denmark) Rasmus Ankersen
(Canada) Adam Bloski
Linesmen:
(Sweden) Gustav Jönsson
(Belgium) Frédéric Monnaie

0–1	24:12 – Hou (Chen Z., Chen S.)
0–2	49:35 – Zheng (Hou, Zuo) (PP)
0–3	55:33 – Zhang Z. (EN)

10 min
Penalties
4 min
28
Shots
28

27 April 2024; 16:00	Spain	0–3 (0–0, 0–2, 0–1)	Lithuania	Twinsbet Arena, Vilnius; Attendance: 2,516

Game reference

Raul Barbo
Goalies
Mantas Armalis
Referees:
(United States) Nolan Bloyer
(Kazakhstan) Anton Boryayev
Linesmen:
(Hungary) Norbert Muzsik
(Canada) Shawn Oliver

0–1	22:07 – Kumeliauskas (Četvertak)
0–2	37:09 – Gintautas (Čižas, Rumševičius)
0–3	54:23 – Kudrevičius (Ališauskas, Noreika)

4 min
Penalties
8 min
23
Shots
38

27 April 2024; 19:30	Estonia	0–8 (0–1, 0–3, 0–4)	Ukraine	Twinsbet Arena, Vilnius; Attendance: 227

Game reference

Conrad Mölder
Goalies
Bogdan Dyachenko
Referees:
(Norway) Roy Hansen
(Sweden) Richard Magnusson
Linesmen:
(United States) John Rey
(Lithuania) Aleksej Sascenkov

0–1	11:44 – Peresunko (Ratushny, Mazur)
0–2	21:36 – Sadovikov (Zakharov, Lialka) (PP)
0–3	21:47 – Denyskin (Ratushny, Fadyeyev)
0–4	25:27 – Trakht (Peresunko, Pangelov-Yuldashev)
0–5	47:24 – Kryvoshapkin (Vorona, Yanishevsky)
0–6	52:41 – Merezhko (Peresunko, Tolstushko)
0–7	54:58 – Denyskin (Yanishevsky)
0–8	55:55 – Morozov (Sadovikov)

4 min
Penalties
6 min
16
Shots
34

28 April 2024; 12:30	China	7–1 (2–1, 1–0, 4–0)	Spain	Twinsbet Arena, Vilnius; Attendance: 253

Game reference

Chen Shifeng
Goalies
Raul Barbo
Marco Hernández
Referees:
(Croatia) Trpimir Piragić
(Germany) Bastian Steingross
Linesmen:
(Latvia) Agris Ozoliņš
(Lithuania) Aleksej Sascenkov

Yan J. (Zuo, Zhang P.) – 03:10	1–0
	1–1	Capillas (González, Torralba) – 17:58
Hou (Wang J.) – 19:14	2–1
Guo J. (Wang J., Hou) – 36:51	3–1
Chen Z. (Hou) – 40:53	4–1
Zuo (SH) – 44:43	5–1
Yan J. (Guo S., Zhang P.) – 49:04	6–1
Li Zhih. (Wang G., Zuo) – 56:31	7–1

10 min
Penalties
4 min
30
Shots
31

28 April 2024; 16:00	Lithuania	6–1 (3–1, 1–0, 2–0)	Estonia	Twinsbet Arena, Vilnius; Attendance: 2,545

Game reference

Mantas Armalis
Goalies
Conrad Mölder
Villem-Henrik Koitmaa
Referees:
(Canada) Adam Bloski
(Norway) Roy Hansen
Linesmen:
(Belgium) Frédéric Monnaie
(Canada) Shawn Oliver

Kaleinikovas (Ališauskas, Gintautas) – 00:38	1–0
	1–1	06:03 – Jürgens (Rooba, Kombe)
Gintautas (Grinius, Noreika) (PP) – 07:37	2–1
Verenis (Kumeliauskas) – 13:02	3–1
Kaleinikovas (Krakauskas, Laimutis) – 35:18	4–1
Četvertak (Kumeliauskas) – 40:49	5–1
Verenis (Čižas, Seniut) – 55:45	6–1

4 min
Penalties
12 min
33
Shots
17

28 April 2024; 19:30	Ukraine	4–0 (2–0, 1–0, 1–0)	Netherlands	Twinsbet Arena, Vilnius; Attendance: 283

Game reference

Eduard Zakharchenko
Goalies
Martijn Oosterwijk
Referees:
(United States) Nolan Bloyer
(Sweden) Richard Magnusson
Linesmen:
(Sweden) Gustav Jönsson
(Hungary) Norbert Muzsik

Pangelov-Yuldashev (Sadovikov, Zakharov) (PP) – 07:13	1–0
Merezhko (Yanishevsky, Morozov) – 12:41	2–0
Zakharov (Lialka, Pangelov-Yuldashev) – 33:11	3–0
Peresunko (Morozov, Sysak) – 45:44	4–0

10 min
Penalties
6 min
44
Shots
15

30 April 2024; 12:30	Ukraine	9–0 (4–0, 2–0, 3–0)	China	Twinsbet Arena, Vilnius; Attendance: 175

Game reference

Eduard Zakharchenko
Goalies
Chen Shifeng
Referees:
(Norway) Roy Hansen
(Croatia) Trpimir Piragić
Linesmen:
(Hungary) Norbert Muzsik
(Latvia) Agris Ozoliņš

Merezhko (Vorona, Fadyeyev) – 02:08	1–0
Peresunko (Dakhnovsky, Pangelov-Yuldashev) – 09:46	2–0
Pangelov-Yuldashev (Dakhnovsky, Fadyeyev) – 11:33	3–0
Vorona (Merezhko, Mazur) (PP) – 13:18	4–0
Lialka (Sysak) – 23:38	5–0
Peresunko (Mazur, Merezhko) – 37:04	6–0
Lialka (Kryvoshapkin, Pangelov-Yuldashev) (PP) – 42:11	7–0
Denyskin (Sysak, Fadyeyev) – 51:06	8–0
Merezhko (Zakharov) – 57:46	9–0

6 min
Penalties
12 min
50
Shots
7

30 April 2024; 16:00	Spain	3–4 OT (1–1, 1–2, 1–0) (OT: 0–1)	Estonia	Twinsbet Arena, Vilnius; Attendance: 241

Game reference

Raul Barbo
Goalies
Villem-Henrik Koitmaa
Referees:
(Sweden) Richard Magnusson
(Germany) Bastian Steingross
Linesmen:
(Sweden) Gustav Jönsson
(Lithuania) Aleksej Sascenkov

	0–1	03:02 – Jürgens (Kulintsev, Rooba) (PP)
Baldris (Rubio) (PP) – 08:40	1–1
Zaballa (Donath, Muratet) – 20:18	2–1
	2–2	23:23 – Rooba (Fursa)
	2–3	36:55 – Viitanen (Kombe)
Capillas (Burgos, De Bonilla) (PP) – 41:46	3–3
	3–4	60:46 – Rooba (Kombe, Ossipov)

10 min
Penalties
27 min
16
Shots
25

30 April 2024; 19:30	Lithuania	3–2 (0–0, 2–1, 1–1)	Netherlands	Twinsbet Arena, Vilnius; Attendance: 2,413

Game reference

Faustas Nauseda
Goalies
Ruud Leeuwesteijn
Referees:
(Denmark) Rasmus Ankersen
(Kazakhstan) Anton Boryayev
Linesmen:
(Belgium) Frédéric Monnaie
(United States) John Rey

	0–1	20:59 – Huisman (De Bonth, Sars)
Kaleinikovas (Protčenko, Ališauskas) – 23:01	1–1
Ališauskas (Krakauskas, Čižas) – 35:31	2–1
Čižas (Kaleinikovas, Gintautas) – 48:20	3–1
	3–2	53:26 – Vosmer

4 min
Penalties
6 min
29
Shots
20

1 May 2024; 12:30	Ukraine	6–1 (0–0, 1–1, 5–0)	Spain	Twinsbet Arena, Vilnius; Attendance: 364

Game reference

Bogdan Dyachenko
Goalies
Marco Hernández
Referees:
(Kazakhstan) Anton Boryayev
(Croatia) Trpimir Piragić
Linesmen:
(Canada) Shawn Oliver
(Latvia) Agris Ozoliņš

	0–1	23:13 – González (De Bonilla, Carbonell) (PP)
Trakht (Peresunko) – 36:13	1–1
Sadovikov (Denyskin, Lialka)(PP) – 43:28	2–1
Kryvoshapkin (Dakhnovsky, Denyskin) – 45:12	3–1
Zakharov (Borodai, Dakhnovsky) – 49:25	4–1
Sadovikov (Fadyeyev, Lialka) (PP) – 51:12	5–1
Trakht (Peresunko, Merezhko) – 57:31	6–1

6 min
Penalties
6 min
41
Shots
12

1 May 2024; 16:00	Estonia	3–2 (0–0, 2–1, 1–1)	Netherlands	Twinsbet Arena, Vilnius; Attendance: 195

Game reference

Villem-Henrik Koitmaa
Goalies
Martijn Oosterwijk
Referees:
(Canada) Adam Bloski
(United States) Nolan Bloyer
Linesmen:
(Belgium) Frédéric Monnaie
(Lithuania) Aleksej Sascenkov

Jürgens (Fursa, Kombe) (PP) – 24:44	1–0
	1–1	31:12 – Filippini (Huisman)
Kombe (Kookmaa, Rooba) – 34:05	2–1
	2–2	42:04 – Loginov (Sars, Van Gorp) (PP)
Rooba (Kulintsev, Kombe) – 49:51	3–2

4 min
Penalties
12 min
34
Shots
17

1 May 2024; 19:30	China	0–3 (0–1, 0–0, 0–2)	Lithuania	Twinsbet Arena, Vilnius; Attendance: 2,592

Game reference

Chen Shifeng
Goalies
Mantas Armalis
Referees:
(Denmark) Rasmus Ankersen
(Germany) Bastian Steingross
Linesmen:
(Sweden) Gustav Jönsson
(United States) John Rey

0–1	04:10 – Kaleinikovas (Čižas, Gintautas)
0–2	40:53 – Gintautas (Čižas, Protčenko)
0–3	59:59 – Grinius (PS)

12 min
Penalties
4 min
15
Shots
35

3 May 2024; 12:30	Netherlands	0–1 (0–0, 0–0, 0–1)	Spain	Twinsbet Arena, Vilnius; Attendance: 142

Game reference
Martijn Oosterwijk	Goalies	Raul Barbo	Referees: (United States) Nolan Bloyer (Germany) Bastian Steingross; Linesmen: (Sweden) Gustav Jönsson (Hungary) Norbert Muzsik
0–1 / 41:45 – Torralba (Baldris, Burgos) (PP)			Referees: (United States) Nolan Bloyer (Germany) Bastian Steingross; Linesmen: (Sweden) Gustav Jönsson (Hungary) Norbert Muzsik
8 min	Penalties	8 min	Referees: (United States) Nolan Bloyer (Germany) Bastian Steingross; Linesmen: (Sweden) Gustav Jönsson (Hungary) Norbert Muzsik
15	Shots	30	Referees: (United States) Nolan Bloyer (Germany) Bastian Steingross; Linesmen: (Sweden) Gustav Jönsson (Hungary) Norbert Muzsik

3 May 2024; 16:00	China	1–3 (0–1, 0–0, 1–2)	Estonia	Twinsbet Arena, Vilnius; Attendance: 236

Game reference

Chen Shifeng
Goalies
Villem-Henrik Koitmaa
Referees:
(Denmark) Rasmus Ankersen
(Kazakhstan) Anton Boryayev
Linesmen:
(Latvia) Agris Ozoliņš
(Lithuania) Aleksej Sascenkov

	0–1	13:02 – Rooba (Kombe, Kulintsev) (PP)
	0–2	50:16 – Fursa (Jürgens, Kulintsev) (PP)
Hou (Zhang Z., Wang J.) (PP) – 51:58	1–2
	1–3	58:06 – Rooba (EN)

10 min
Penalties
8 min
13
Shots
31

3 May 2024; 19:30	Lithuania	1–4 (0–1, 0–1, 1–2)	Ukraine	Twinsbet Arena, Vilnius; Attendance: 4,260

Game reference

Mantas Armalis
Goalies
Bogdan Dyachenko
Referees:
(Canada) Adam Bloski
(Sweden) Richard Magnusson
Linesmen:
(Canada) Shawn Oliver
(United States) John Rey

	0–1	09:19 – Trakht (Merezhko, Peresunko) (PP)
	0–2	30:56 – Trakht (Sysak, Peresunko)
	0–3	53:54 – Denyskin (Pangelov-Yuldashev, Merezhko) (PP)
Noreika (Krakauskas, Ališauskas) (PP, EA) – 57:11	1–3
	1–4	57:51 – Peresunko (EN)

10 min
Penalties
6 min
18
Shots
25

=== Statistics ===
==== Scoring leaders ====
List shows the top skaters sorted by points, then goals.

Player	GP	G	A	Pts	+/−	PIM	POS
(Ukraine) Olexander Peresunko	5	5	6	11	+10	0	F
(Ukraine) Igor Merezhko	5	4	5	9	+12	4	D
(Estonia) Robert Rooba	5	5	3	8	−3	2	F
(Ukraine) Pylyp Pangelov-Yuldashev	5	2	5	7	+4	0	D
(Estonia) Kristjan Kombe	5	1	6	7	−2	0	F
(Ukraine) Andri Denyskin	5	4	2	6	+7	0	F
(Lithuania) Paulius Gintautas	5	3	3	6	+6	2	F
(China) Hou Yuyang	4	3	3	6	−1	0	F
(Ukraine) Vitali Lialka	5	2	4	6	+4	0	F
(Lithuania) Ugnius Čižas	5	1	5	6	+6	2	F

GP = Games played; G = Goals; A = Assists; Pts = Points; +/− = Plus/Minus; PIM = Penalties in Minutes; POS = Position
Source: IIHF.com

==== Goaltending leaders ====
Only the top five goaltenders, based on save percentage, who have played at least 40% of their team's minutes, are included in this list.

Player	TOI	GA	GAA	SA	Sv%	SO
(Ukraine) Eduard Zakharchenko	120:00	0	0.00	22	100.00	2
(Ukraine) Bogdan Dyachenko	180:00	2	0.67	46	95.65	1
(Lithuania) Mantas Armalis	238:39	4	1.01	79	94.94	2
(Netherlands) Martijn Oosterwijk	176:09	8	2.72	108	92.59	0
(China) Chen Shifeng	298:24	15	3.02	174	91.38	1

TOI = time on ice (minutes:seconds); SA = shots against; GA = goals against; GAA = goals against average; Sv% = save percentage; SO = shutouts
Source: IIHF.com

=== Awards ===
Position	Player
Goaltender	(Lithuania) Mantas Armalis
Defenceman	(Ukraine) Igor Merezhko
Forward	(Estonia) Robert Rooba
