= Damian Clara =

Italian ice hockey player (born 2005)

- Born: 13 January 2005 (age 21) Bruneck, Italy
- Height: 1.97 m (6 ft 6 in)
- Weight: 97 kg (214 lb; 15 st 4 lb)
- Position: Goaltender
- Catches: Left
- NHL team (P) Cur. team Former teams: Anaheim Ducks; San Diego Gulls (AHL); Färjestad BK; Brynäs IF; Oulun Kärpät
- National team: Italy
- NHL draft: 60th overall, 2023; Anaheim Ducks
- Playing career: 2022–present

Damian Clara (born 13 January 2005) is an Italian professional ice hockey player who is a goaltender for the San Diego Gulls of the American Hockey League (AHL) while under contract to the Anaheim Ducks of the National Hockey League (NHL). He was drafted 60th overall by the Anaheim Ducks in the second round of the 2023 NHL entry draft. He is the first Italian player to be selected in the NHL entry draft.

== Playing career ==
At age 15, Clara played at the Red Bull Hockey Academy in Salzburg, Austria, for two years before joining Färjestad BK's under-20 program in 2022. During the 2022–23 season with Färjestad's under-20 team, he played 35 games and recorded a 17–17–0 record with a 2.79 goals against average and a .903 save percentage.

On 29 June 2023, Clara was drafted 60th overall by the Anaheim Ducks in the 2023 NHL entry draft.

Clara was loaned to Brynäs IF of the HockeyAllsvenskan for the 2023–24 season, where he played 34 games posting a 25–8–0 record with a 2.23 goals against average and a .912 save percentage. In the playoffs, he went 10–1 with a 1.68 goals against average and a .931 save percentage en route to a promotion for Brynäs IF to the Swedish Hockey League (SHL).

On 3 June 2024, Clara signed a three-year, entry-level contract with the Anaheim Ducks, but was loaned back to Färjestad BK for the 2024–25 season.

Clara was the backup goaltender behind Maxime Lagacé for Färjestad BK throughout the 2024–25 SHL season. He played 21 games and had a 9–10–0 record with a 3.19 goals against average and a .878 save percentage. On 14 February 2025, Clara's contract with Färjestad BK was terminated at the recommendation of the Anaheim Ducks, who had his National Hockey League (NHL) rights. On 15 February, he signed with Oulun Kärpät of the Finnish Liiga for the rest of the 2024–25 Liiga season. After Kärpät's season ended, the Anaheim Ducks assigned Clara to the San Diego Gulls, their American Hockey League (AHL) affiliate, where he played two games and went 0–1–0 with a 3.15 goals against average and a .898 save percentage.

Clara played most of the 2025–26 season with Brynäs IF, but was assigned to the San Diego Gulls to start three regular season games and two Calder Cup playoff games. On 26 April 2026, after the Gulls had been eliminated from the Calder Cup playoffs, Clara was called up to the Anaheim Ducks as a black ace for the 2026 Stanley Cup playoffs. He didn't play a game for the Ducks as they were eliminated in the second round by the Vegas Golden Knights.

== International play ==
Clara first played internationally at the 2021 World Championship for Italy, becoming the youngest goaltender to dress at the World Championship. He represented Italy in Division 1B (third level) of the 2022 World U18 Championship where he played four games and had a 2–2 record with a 3.02 goals against average and a .906 save percentage. Later in the same season, he played for Italy in Division 2A (fourth level) of the 2022 IIHF World Junior Championship where he played three games recording a 2–0 record with a 1.20 goals against average and a .942 save percentage. In 2023, he played in three tournaments for Italy; the World U18 Championship, World Junior Championships and World Championship. Italy played in Division 1B for the World U18s and World Juniors, and in Division 1A for the World Championship. Clara played for Italy in both the 2024 IIHF World Championship Division 1A (second level) and the 2025 IIHF World Championship Division 1A, where Italy was promoted to the top division for the 2026 tournament.

On 16 June 2025, Clara was one of the first six players selected to represent Italy in the 2026 Winter Olympics as the host nation. In Italy's opening game against Sweden, Clara made 46 saves before leaving with an injury in the third period of an eventual 5–2 loss. Clara played in three more games for the hosts, who were eliminated by Switzerland in the first round of the knockout stage.

After the Anaheim Ducks were eliminated from the 2026 Stanley Cup playoffs, Clara joined Italy at the 2026 IIHF World Championship. Clara made his top-division debut against Czechia on 20 May, where he made 55 saves on 57 shots, holding the Czechs to no goals in the first two periods in an eventual 3–1 loss.

== Career statistics ==
=== Regular season and playoffs ===
			Regular season									Playoffs
Season	Team	League	GP	W	L	T/OT	MIN	GA	SO	GAA	SV%	GP	W	L	MIN	GA	SO	GAA	SV%
2021–22	Red Bull Hockey Juniors	AlpsHL	1	1	0	0	60	3	0	3.00	.893	—	—	—	—	—	—	—	—
2022–23	Färjestad BK	J20	35	17	17	0	2,065	96	0	2.79	.903	2	0	2	119	9	0	4.54	.883
2022–23	BIK Karlskoga	HA	2	1	1	0	120	5	0	2.50	.935	—	—	—	—	—	—	—	—
2023–24	Brynäs IF	HA	34	25	8	0	1,937	72	4	2.23	.913	11	10	1	679	19	0	1.68	.930
2024–25	Färjestad BK	SHL	21	9	10	0	998	53	1	3.19	.879	—	—	—	—	—	—	—	—
2024–25	Färjestad BK	J20	2	1	1	0	98	6	0	3.67	.878	—	—	—	—	—	—	—	—
2024–25	Oulun Kärpät	Liiga	10	3	7	0	579	24	1	2.49	.910	—	—	—	—	—	—	—	—
2024–25	San Diego Gulls	AHL	2	0	1	0	95	5	0	3.15	.898	—	—	—	—	—	—	—	—
2025–26	Brynäs IF	SHL	33	17	15	0	1,929	81	2	2.52	.887	2	1	1	126	5	0	2.38	.864
2025–26	San Diego Gulls	AHL	3	1	2	0	178	12	0	4.04	.868	2	0	2	118	7	0	3.57	.877
SHL totals			54	26	25	0	2,927	134	3	2.75	.884	2	1	1	126	5	0	2.38	.864
Liiga totals			10	3	7	0	579	24	1	2.49	.910	—	—	—	—	—	—	—	—

=== International ===
Year	Team	Event	Result	GP	W	L	T/OT	MIN	GA	SO	GAA	SV%
2022	Italy	U18 D1B	3rd	4	2	2	0	239	12	0	3.02	.906
2022	Italy	WJC D2A	1st	3	2	0	0	149	3	1	1.20	.942
2023	Italy	U18 D1B	3rd	4	3	1	0	240	5	1	1.25	.954
2023	Italy	WJC D1B	3rd	5	3	2	0	303	13	0	2.58	.917
2023	Italy	WC D1A	3rd	2	2	0	0	120	5	0	2.50	.898
2024	Italy	WC D1A	3rd	4	2	2	0	241	9	0	2.24	.904
2025	Italy	WC D1A	2nd	1	0	0	0	39	2	0	3.06	.818
2026	Italy	OG	12th	4	0	4	0	152	13	0	5.13	.911
2026	Italy	WC	11th	3	0	3	0	179	10	0	3.35	.921
Junior totals				16	10	5	0	931	33	2	2.13	.926
Senior totals				14	4	9	0	731	39	0	3.20	.909
