= Michele Marchetti =

Italian ice hockey player

- Born: September 27, 1994 (age 31) Trento, Italy
- Height: 6 ft 1 in (185 cm)
- Weight: 183 lb (83 kg; 13 st 1 lb)
- Position: Forward
- Shoots: Left
- AHL team Former teams: HCB South Tyrol; SHC Fassa; HC Gherdëina; Alleghe Hockey
- National team: Italy
- Playing career: 2011–present

Michele Marchetti (born September 27, 1994) is an Italian ice hockey player for HCB South Tyrol and the Italian national team.

He participated at the 2017 IIHF World Championship.
