= Peter Spornberger =

Italian ice hockey player

2026-08-30 Bílí Tygři Liberec gegen Iserlohn Roosters (Sachsenlotto-Cup 2026) by Sandro Halank–083.jpg
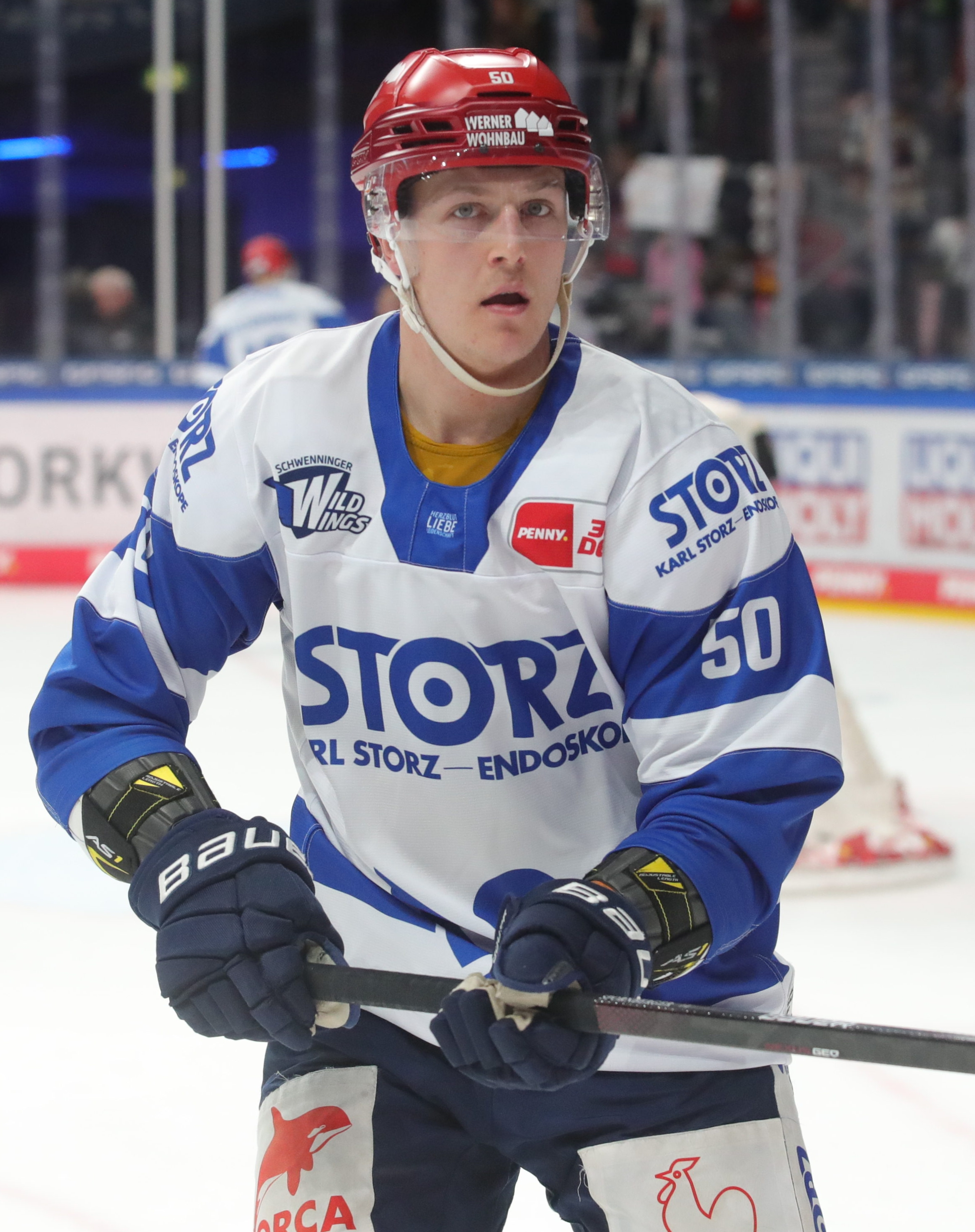
- Spornberger with the Iserlohn Roosters in 2026
- Born: 6 January 1999 (age 27) Bolzano, Italy
- Height: 1.86 m (6 ft 1 in)
- Weight: 94 kg (207 lb; 14 st 11 lb)
- Position: Defence
- Shoots: Left
- DEL team Former teams: ERC Ingolstadt; EHC Freiburg; Schwenninger Wild Wings; HC Bozen–Bolzano
- National team: Italy
- NHL draft: Undrafted
- Playing career: 2019–present

Peter Spornberger (born 6 January 1999) is an Italian professional ice hockey player who is a defenceman for ERC Ingolstadt of the Deutsche Eishockey Liga (DEL).

== Playing career ==
Spornberger developed in the youth systems of Ritten/Renon and the Wipptal Broncos before moving to Germany, where he also played junior hockey for EV Landshut and the Kölner Junghaie.

In 2019, he began his professional career with EHC Freiburg in the DEL2. In May 2021, he signed with the Schwenninger Wild Wings of the DEL. His contract was extended in March 2023.

In May 2024, Spornberger returned to Italy and signed with HC Bozen–Bolzano of the ICE Hockey League. In June 2025, he signed with ERC Ingolstadt, returning to the DEL.

== International play ==
Spornberger represented Italy at the 2021 IIHF World Championship.

He also represented Italy at the 2022 IIHF World Championship, the 2023 IIHF World Championship Division I, and the 2024 IIHF World Championship Division I.

== Personal life ==
His brother, Leo Spornberger, is also an ice hockey player. Spornberger's cousin is ice hockey player Manuel Öhler.

== Career statistics ==
=== Regular season and playoffs ===
			Regular season					Playoffs
Season	Team	League	GP	G	A	Pts	PIM	GP	G	A	Pts	PIM
2018–19	Kölner Junghaie U20	DNL U20	29	4	15	19	20	4	0	1	1	2
2019–20	EHC Freiburg	DEL2	47	2	12	14	10	—	—	—	—	—
2020–21	EHC Freiburg	DEL2	49	2	18	20	16	7	0	2	2	6
2021–22	Schwenninger Wild Wings	DEL	43	2	5	7	16	—	—	—	—	—
2022–23	Schwenninger Wild Wings	DEL	40	0	4	4	32	—	—	—	—	—
2023–24	Schwenninger Wild Wings	DEL	30	1	7	8	6	—	—	—	—	—
2024–25	HC Bolzano	ICEHL	43	1	15	16	16	7	0	0	0	4
2025–26	ERC Ingolstadt	DEL	24	0	2	2	8	4	0	0	0	2
DEL totals			137	3	18	21	62	4	0	0	0	2

=== International ===
Year	Team	Event	GP	G	A	Pts	PIM
2016	Italy U18	WJC-18 (D1B)	5	0	0	0	2
2017	Italy U20	WJC-20 (D1B)	5	0	1	1	0
2017	Italy U18	WJC-18 (D1B)	5	1	0	1	2
2018	Italy U20	WJC-20 (D1B)	5	0	0	0	6
2019	Italy U20	WJC-20 (D1B)	5	1	1	2	0
2021	Italy	WC	7	0	0	0	2
2021	Italy	OGQ	3	0	0	0	2
2022	Italy	WC	7	0	0	0	4
2023	Italy	WC (D1A)	5	0	1	1	2
2024	Italy	WC (D1A)	5	0	2	2	2
2026	Italy	WC	7	0	0	0	2
Junior totals			25	2	2	4	10
Senior totals			34	0	3	3	14
