= Luca Frigo =

Italian ice hockey player (born 1993)

- Born: 30 May 1993 (age 32) Moncalieri, Italy
- Height: 6 ft 0 in (183 cm)
- Weight: 198 lb (90 kg; 14 st 2 lb)
- Position: Left wing
- Shoots: Left
- ICEHL team Former teams: HC Bolzano; HC Valpellice; Kallinge-Ronneby IF
- National team: Italy
- NHL draft: Undrafted
- Playing career: 2009–present

Luca Frigo (born 30 May 1993) is an Italian professional ice hockey player who is a left winger for HC Bolzano of the ICE Hockey League (ICEHL).

== International play ==
Frigo represented the Italy national team at the 2026 Winter Olympics and the 2017 IIHF World Championship.

== Career statistics ==
=== Regular season and playoffs ===
			Regular season					Playoffs
Season	Team	League	GP	G	A	Pts	PIM	GP	G	A	Pts	PIM
2007–08	HC Valpellice U19	Italy U19	15	9	6	15	14	7	4	4	8	12
2009–10	HC Valpellice U18	Italy U18	11	32	18	50	14	1	3	2	5	0
2009–10	HC Varese U20	Italy U20	2	1	0	1	2	—	—	—	—	—
2009–10	HC Valpellice	Italy	38	1	3	4	16	1	0	0	0	0
2010–11	HC Valpellice U18	Italy U18	1	4	1	5	0	3	3	3	6	4
2010–11	HC Valpellice	Italy	36	9	8	17	38	9	0	4	4	2
2010–11	Real Torino HC	Italy2	4	0	0	0	2	—	—	—	—	—
2011–12	HC Valpellice	Italy	35	8	13	21	52	5	1	2	3	14
2012–13	Omaha Lancers	USHL	48	10	8	18	70	—	—	—	—	—
2013–14	Omaha Lancers	USHL	58	19	15	34	92	4	1	1	2	8
2014–15	HC Valpellice	Italy	20	14	13	27	58	5	1	1	2	4
2015–16	Kallinge-Ronneby IF	Hockeyettan	30	9	9	18	28	—	—	—	—	—
2016–17	HC Bolzano	EBEL	54	4	12	16	22	9	1	2	3	0
2017–18	HC Bolzano	EBEL	52	3	7	10	8	18	2	3	5	2
2018–19	HC Bolzano	EBEL	44	6	11	17	14	5	2	1	3	0
2019–20	HC Bolzano	EBEL	48	8	12	20	10	3	0	0	0	4
2020–21	HC Bolzano	ICEHL	45	5	11	16	31	16	4	3	7	10
2021–22	HC Bolzano	ICEHL	42	8	10	18	10	2	0	0	0	0
2022–23	HC Bolzano	ICEHL	47	14	13	27	10	19	5	0	5	4
2023–24	HC Bolzano	ICEHL	46	11	14	25	10	12	4	4	8	2
2024–25	HC Bolzano	ICEHL	46	15	15	30	23	11	0	1	1	2
2025–26	HC Bolzano	ICEHL	47	10	8	18	12	5	0	1	1	2
ICEHL (EBEL) totals			471	84	113	197	150	100	18	15	33	26

=== International ===
Year	Team	Event	GP	G	A	Pts	PIM
2010	Italy U18	WJC-18 (D2)	5	3	4	7	4
2011	Italy U20	WJC-20 (D1)	5	1	0	1	4
2011	Italy U18	WJC-18 (D1)	4	3	1	4	6
2013	Italy U20	WJC-20 (D1)	5	1	2	3	2
2015	Italy	WC (D1A)	5	1	0	1	0
2016	Italy	OGQ	3	1	0	1	2
2016	Italy	WC (D1A)	5	1	2	3	2
2017	Italy	WC	5	1	1	2	0
2021	Italy	WC	7	2	1	3	8
2021	Italy	OGQ	3	0	1	1	2
2022	Italy	WC	7	2	1	3	2
2023	Italy	WC (D1A)	5	2	5	7	0
2024	Italy	WC (D1A)	5	2	3	5	2
2025	Italy	WC (D1A)	5	1	0	1	2
2026	Italy	OG	4	1	0	1	2
2026	Italy	WC	6	0	0	0	2
Junior totals			19	8	7	15	16
Senior totals			60	14	14	28	24
