= Daniel Mantenuto =

Canadian-Italian ice hockey player (born 1997)

- Born: 18 October 1997 (age 28) Thornhill, Ontario, Canada
- Height: 5 ft 10 in (178 cm)
- Weight: 181 lb (82 kg; 12 st 13 lb)
- Position: Centre
- Shoots: Left
- ICEHL team Former teams: HC Bolzano; Asiago
- National team: Italy
- NHL draft: Undrafted
- Playing career: 2020–present

Daniel Thomas Mantenuto (born 18 October 1997) is a Canadian-Italian professional ice hockey player who is a centre for HC Bozen–Bolzano in the ICE Hockey League (ICEHL).

== Playing career ==
Mantenuto played college hockey for the Robert Morris Colonials from 2016 to 2020.

He signed with HC Bozen–Bolzano for the 2022–23 season. He re-signed with Bolzano in May 2024.

== International play ==
Mantenuto represented the Italy national team at the 2026 Winter Olympics and the 2022 IIHF World Championship.

== Personal life ==
Mantenuto gained an Italian passport after his second season playing in Italy.

== Career statistics ==
=== Regular season and playoffs ===
			Regular season					Playoffs
Season	Team	League	GP	G	A	Pts	PIM	GP	G	A	Pts	PIM
2012–13	Markham Majors U16 AAA	GTHL U16	52	14	14	28	24	—	—	—	—	—
2012–13	Markham Majors U18 AAA	GTHL U18	6	0	1	1	2	—	—	—	—	—
2013–14	Markham Majors U18 AAA	GTHL U18	14	2	4	6	0	—	—	—	—	—
2014–15	Aurora Tigers	OJHL	54	13	35	48	16	4	1	1	2	0
2015–16	Aurora Tigers	OJHL	53	21	25	46	24	6	0	4	4	6
2016–17	Robert Morris University	NCAA	36	4	10	14	6	—	—	—	—	—
2017–18	Robert Morris University	NCAA	40	5	7	12	4	—	—	—	—	—
2018–19	Robert Morris University	NCAA	40	8	15	23	12	—	—	—	—	—
2019–20	Robert Morris University	NCAA	24	5	12	17	6	—	—	—	—	—
2020–21	Asiago	AlpsHL	34	13	19	32	4	11	1	8	9	2
2020–21	Asiago	Italy	5	1	5	6	0	—	—	—	—	—
2021–22	Asiago	AlpsHL	39	15	24	39	6	11	1	11	12	4
2021–22	Asiago	Italy	3	2	1	3	0	—	—	—	—	—
2022–23	HC Bolzano	ICEHL	48	6	14	20	2	19	1	6	7	0
2023–24	HC Bolzano	ICEHL	48	15	18	33	8	12	2	3	5	0
2024–25	HC Bolzano	ICEHL	48	5	12	17	6	11	0	1	1	2
2025–26	HC Bolzano	ICEHL	46	7	11	18	12	5	0	1	1	0
AlpsHL totals			73	28	43	71	10	22	2	19	21	6
ICEHL totals			190	33	55	88	28	47	3	11	14	2

=== International ===
Year	Team	Event	GP	G	A	Pts	PIM
2022	Italy	WC	7	1	0	1	2
2023	Italy	WC (D1A)	5	3	4	7	2
2024	Italy	WC (D1A)	5	2	3	5	4
2025	Italy	WC (D1A)	5	2	0	2	0
2026	Italy	OG	4	0	0	0	2
2026	Italy	WC	7	0	1	1	2
Senior totals			33	8	8	16	12
