= Bence Bálizs =

Hungarian ice hockey player (born 1990)

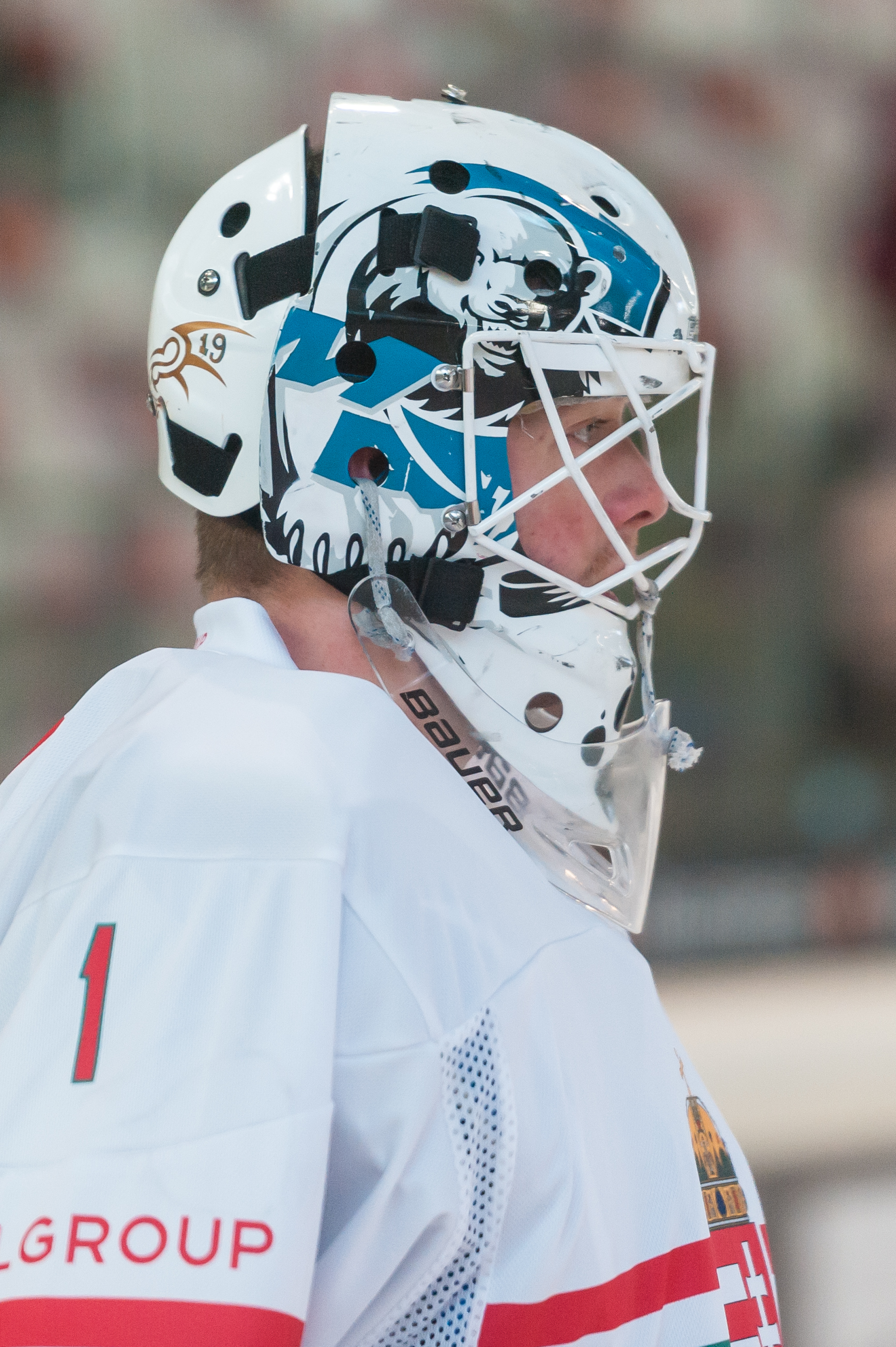
- Born: 30 May 1990 (age 36) Budapest, Hungary
- Height: 193 cm (6 ft 4 in)
- Weight: 95 kg (209 lb; 14 st 13 lb)
- Position: Goaltender
- Catches: Left
- EL team Former teams: MAC Budapest; Alba Volán Székesfehérvár; Miskolci JJSE
- National team: Hungary
- Playing career: 2007–present

Bence Bálizs (born 30 May 1990) is a Hungarian professional ice hockey player who is a goaltender for MAC Budapest of the Erste Liga.
