= Diego Kostner =

Italian ice hockey player (born 1992)

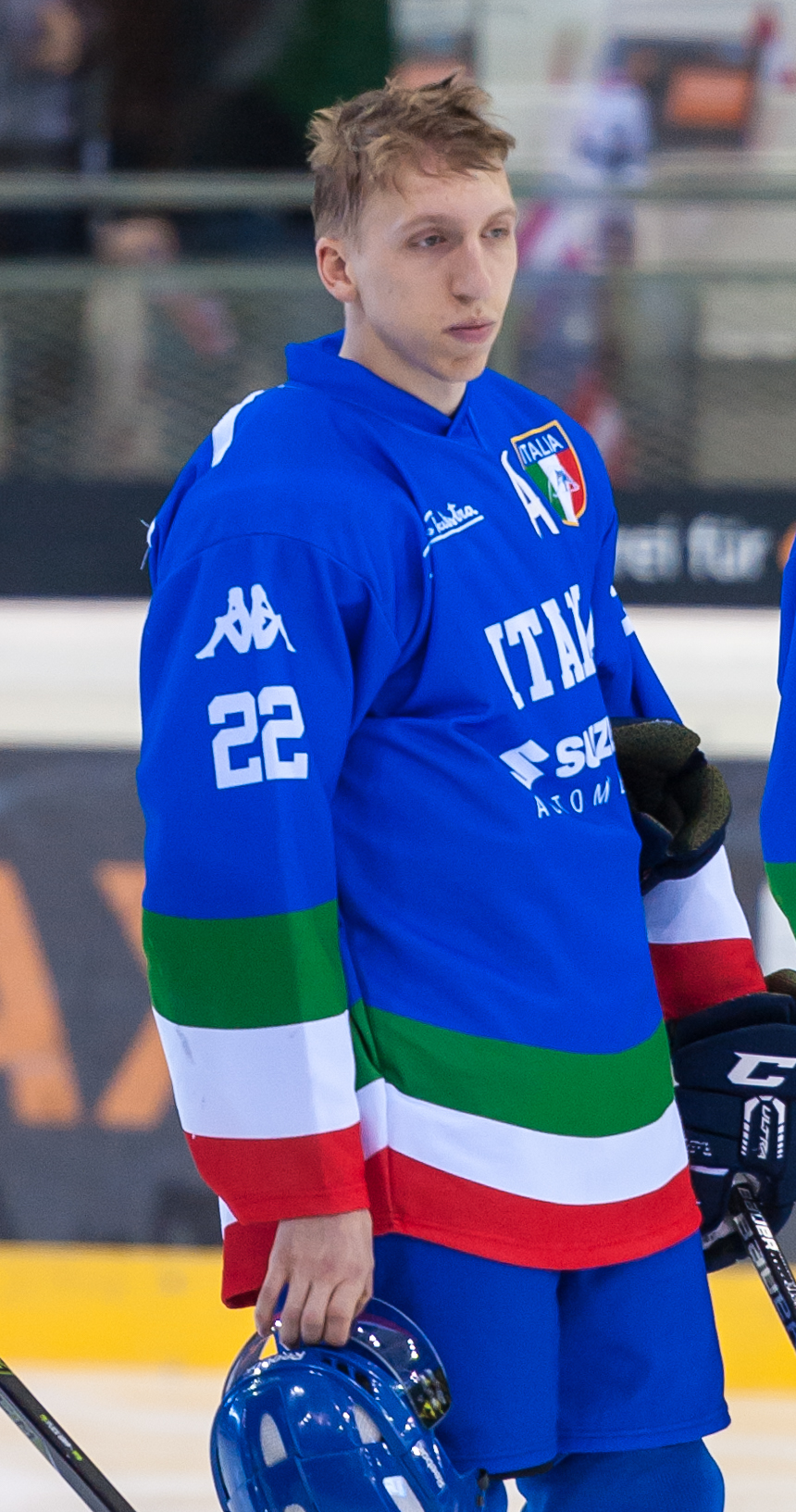
- Born: August 5, 1992 (age 33) Brixen, Italy
- Height: 6 ft 0 in (183 cm)
- Weight: 181 lb (82 kg; 12 st 13 lb)
- Position: Centre
- Shoots: Left
- NL team Former teams: HC Ambrì-Piotta; HC Lugano
- National team: Italy
- Playing career: 2011–present

Diego Kostner (born August 5, 1992) is an Italian professional ice hockey player who is a centre for HC Ambrì-Piotta of the National League (NL).

== Playing career ==
He previously played as a youth and his first five professional years with fellow Swiss club, HC Lugano of the NLA. On February 15, 2016, Kostner agreed to a two-year deal with HC Ambrì-Piotta beginning in the 2016–17 season.

== International play ==
Kostner was named to the Italy national ice hockey team for competition at the 2014 IIHF World Championship.

== Career statistics ==
=== Regular season and playoffs ===
			Regular season					Playoffs
Season	Team	League	GP	G	A	Pts	PIM	GP	G	A	Pts	PIM
2011–12	HC Lugano	NLA	35	2	2	4	2	—	—	—	—	—
2012–13	HC Lugano	NLA	50	6	8	14	8	7	0	0	0	0
2013–14	HC Lugano	NLA	41	6	13	19	16	5	0	0	0	0
2014–15	HC Lugano	NLA	36	3	7	10	20	6	1	2	3	2
2015–16	HC Lugano	NLA	46	1	3	4	8	14	1	1	2	0
2016–17	HC Ambrì-Piotta	NLA	41	1	3	4	18	—	—	—	—	—
2017–18	HC Ambrì-Piotta	NL	50	12	4	16	20	—	—	—	—	—
2018–19	HC Ambrì-Piotta	NL	50	6	7	13	22	5	0	0	0	4
2019–20	HC Ambrì-Piotta	NL	1	1	0	1	0	—	—	—	—	—
2020–21	HC Ambrì-Piotta	NL	50	9	14	23	12	—	—	—	—	—
2021–22	HC Ambrì-Piotta	NL	47	6	7	13	18	3	0	0	0	0
2022–23	HC Ambrì-Piotta	NL	29	1	3	4	10	—	—	—	—	—
2023–24	HC Ambrì-Piotta	NL	32	5	4	9	12	4	0	1	1	0
2024–25	HC Ambrì-Piotta	NL	43	2	1	3	8	4	1	0	1	0
NL totals			551	61	76	137	174	48	3	4	7	6

=== International ===
Year	Team	Event	Result	GP	G	A	Pts	PIM
2009	Italy	WJC18-D1	21st	5	0	0	0	2
2010	Italy	WJC18-D2	24th	5	4	7	11	2
2011	Italy	WJC-D1	17th	5	1	2	3	2
2013	Italy	OGQ	DNQ	3	0	0	0	0
2013	Italy	WC-D1	14th	5	1	2	3	6
2014	Italy	WC	15th	7	1	0	1	6
2015	Italy	WC-D1	19th	3	0	0	0	0
2016	Italy	OGQ	Q	3	2	1	3	0
2016	Italy	WC-D1	18th	5	0	2	2	0
2016	Italy	OGQ	DNQ	3	1	0	1	4
2017	Italy	WC	16th	7	0	0	0	2
2018	Italy	WC-D1	18th	4	2	2	4	0
2019	Italy	WC	14th	5	0	0	0	0
2021	Italy	OGQ	DNQ	3	0	0	0	0
2022	Italy	WC	12th	7	1	0	1	0
2024	Italy	WC-D1	19th	5	3	1	4	0
2025	Italy	WC-D1	18th	5	0	0	0	4
2026	Italy	OG	12th	3	0	0	0	0
Junior totals				15	5	9	14	6
Senior totals				68	11	8	19	22
