= Phil Pietroniro =

Canadian-Italian ice hockey player

- Born: 27 May 1994 (age 32) Saint-Eustache, Quebec, Canada
- Height: 1.85 m (6 ft 1 in)
- Weight: 80 kg (176 lb; 12 st 8 lb)
- Position: Defence
- Shoots: Right
- ELH team Former teams: Rytíři Kladno; Utah Grizzlies; Asiago Hockey 1935; SG Cortina; Scorpions de Mulhouse; HK Dukla Trenčín
- National team: Italy
- NHL draft: Undrafted
- Playing career: 2015–present

Phil Pietroniro (born 27 May 1994) is a Canadian-born Italian professional ice hockey player who is a defenceman for Rytíři Kladno of the Czech Extraliga (ELH).

== International play ==
He represented Italy at the 2021 IIHF World Championship and 2026 Winter Olympics.

== Career statistics ==
=== Regular season and playoffs ===
			Regular season					Playoffs
Season	Team	League	GP	G	A	Pts	PIM	GP	G	A	Pts	PIM
2009–10	PF Changs 16U AAA	T1EHL 16U	38	2	2	4	24	—	—	—	—	—
2010–11	Phoenix Jr. Coyotes 16U AAA	T1EHL 16U	36	4	16	20	28	—	—	—	—	—
2011–12	Corpus Christi IceRays	NAHL	47	5	8	13	66	—	—	—	—	—
2012–13	Corpus Christi IceRays	NAHL	14	3	5	8	31	—	—	—	—	—
2012–13	Shawinigan Cataractes	QMJHL	41	6	5	11	38	—	—	—	—	—
2013–14	Val-d'Or Foreurs	QMJHL	55	6	12	18	61	24	5	3	8	12
2014–15	Gatineau Olympiques	QMJHL	21	2	12	14	12	—	—	—	—	—
2014–15	Victoriaville Tigres	QMJHL	49	3	30	33	69	4	1	4	5	0
2015–16	Utah Grizzlies	ECHL	57	2	14	16	34	10	1	2	3	10
2016–17	Utah Grizzlies	ECHL	68	3	18	21	90	3	0	0	0	2
2017–18	Asiago	AlpsHL	38	6	16	22	69	14	1	8	9	6
2017–18	Asiago	Italy	1	0	1	1	0	—	—	—	—	—
2018–19	Asiago	AlpsHL	26	7	19	26	69	3	0	2	2	12
2018–19	Asiago	Italy	4	0	2	2	6	—	—	—	—	—
2019–20	Asiago	AlpsHL	42	8	30	38	58	—	—	—	—	—
2019–20	Asiago	Italy	6	1	2	3	0	—	—	—	—	—
2020–21	SG Cortina	AlpsHL	36	20	32	52	32	5	1	2	3	4
2020–21	SG Cortina	Italy	2	1	0	1	0	—	—	—	—	—
2021–22	Scorpions de Mulhouse	Ligue Magnus	44	19	20	39	77	6	4	5	9	2
2022–23	HK Dukla Trenčín	Slovak	49	6	18	24	28	5	0	3	3	29
2023–24	HK Dukla Trenčín	Slovak	48	9	28	37	63	5	2	2	4	2
2024–25	Rytíři Kladno	ELH	52	14	11	25	50	—	—	—	—	—
2025–26	Rytíři Kladno	ELH	48	5	13	18	26	5	0	1	1	0
ECHL totals			125	5	32	37	124	13	1	2	3	12
AlpsHL totals			142	41	97	138	228	22	2	12	14	22
Slovak totals			97	15	46	61	91	10	2	5	7	31
ELH totals			100	19	24	43	76	5	0	1	1	0

=== International ===
Year	Team	Event	GP	G	A	Pts	PIM
2021	Italy	WC	7	0	0	0	2
2022	Italy	WC	7	1	2	3	2
2023	Italy	WC (D1A)	5	2	4	6	4
2024	Italy	WC (D1A)	5	1	2	3	0
2025	Italy	WC (D1A)	5	1	3	4	2
2026	Italy	OG	4	0	2	2	0
2026	Italy	WC	7	1	0	1	0
Senior totals			40	6	13	19	10
