= Daniel Frank (ice hockey) =

Italian professional ice hockey player

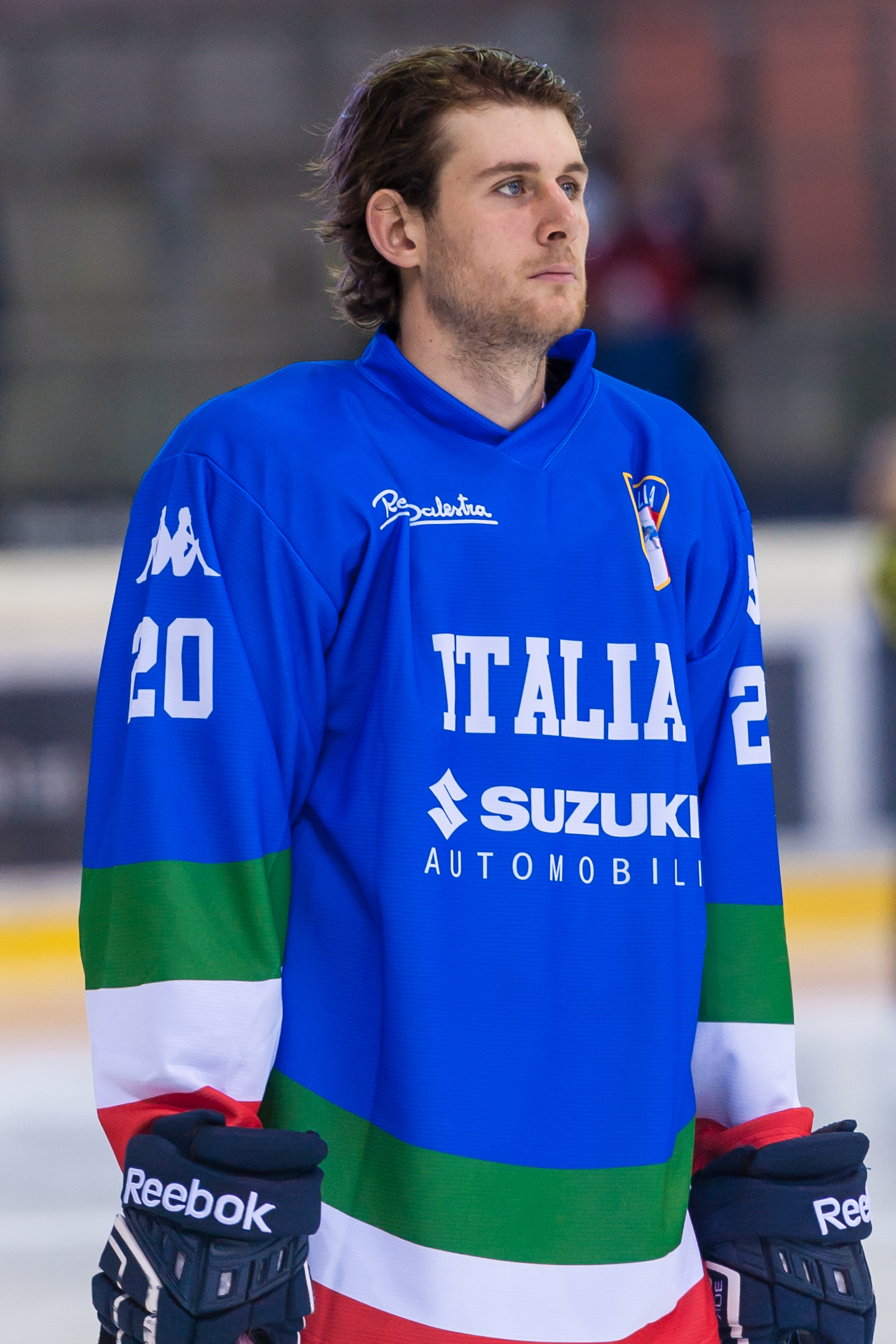
- Born: 21 March 1994 (age 32) Merano, Italy
- Height: 6 ft 2 in (188 cm)
- Weight: 198 lb (90 kg; 14 st 2 lb)
- Position: Forward
- Shoots: Left
- ICEHL team: HC Bolzano
- National team: Italy
- Playing career: 2012–present

Daniel Frank (born 21 March 1994) is an Italian professional ice hockey player. He is currently playing with the HC Bolzano in the ICE Hockey League (ICEHL).

Since 2015 he is also member of the Italy men's national ice hockey team.
