= 2026 IIHF World Championship Group B =

Ice hockey tournament group stage

Group B was one of two groups of the 2026 IIHF World Championship. The four best-placed teams advanced to the playoff round, while the last placed team was relegated to Division I in 2027.

== Standings ==
Pos	Team	Pld	W	OTW	OTL	L	GF	GA	GD	Pts	Qualification or relegation
1	Canada	7	6	1	0	0	33	13	+20	20	Quarterfinals
2	Norway	7	4	1	1	1	25	14	+11	15	Quarterfinals
3	Czechia	7	4	0	1	2	19	17	+2	13	Quarterfinals
4	Sweden	7	4	0	0	3	27	16	+11	12	Quarterfinals
5	Slovakia	7	3	1	0	3	21	19	+2	11	Qualified for the 2027 IIHF World Championship
6	Denmark	7	1	1	1	4	15	26	−11	6 (Note: Denmark 4–0 Slovenia)	Qualified for the 2027 IIHF World Championship
7	Slovenia	7	1	1	1	4	13	25	−12	6	Qualified for the 2027 IIHF World Championship
8	Italy	7	0	0	1	6	5	28	−23	1	Relegated to the 2027 Division I A

Source: IIHF
Rules for classification: 1) points; 2) head-to-head points; 3) head-to-head goal difference; 4) head-to-head number of goals scored; 5) result against closest best-ranked team outside tied teams; 6) seeding before tournament

== Matches ==
All times are local (UTC+2).

=== Canada vs Sweden ===
15 May 2026; 16:20	Canada	5–3 (2–0, 1–3, 2–0)	Sweden	BCF Arena, Fribourg; Attendance: 7,500

Game reference

Jet Greaves
Goalies
Magnus Hellberg
Referees:
(Finland) Riku Brander
(Germany) André Schrader
Linesmen:
(Finland) Onni Hautamäki
(Germany) Patrick Laguzov

Tavares (Nurse, Thomas) – 02:21	1–0
O'Reilly (Vilardi, Rielly) – 16:00	2–0
	2–1	28:21 – Larsson (Berglund)
	2–2	31:04 – Raymond (Ekman-Larsson, Berglund) (PP)
Holloway (Minten, DeMelo) – 34:16	3–2
	3–3	35:33 – Ekholm (Karlsson, Holmström)
Brown (Martone, Minten) – 43:21	4–3
Cozens (Martone, Nurse) – 52:59	5–3

8 min
Penalties
12 min
26
Shots
25

=== Czechia vs Denmark ===
15 May 2026; 20:20	Czechia	4–1 (2–0, 0–0, 2–1)	Denmark	BCF Arena, Fribourg; Attendance: 6,551

Game reference

Josef Kořenář
Goalies
Mads Søgaard
Referees:
(Finland) Mikko Kaukokari
(Austria) Christian Ofner
Linesmen:
(United States) Shane Gustafson
(Switzerland) Dominic Schlegel

Kubalík (Flek) – 08:50	1–0
Voženílek (Tomášek) – 10:00	2–0
Červenka (Blümel, Tomášek) – 43:32	3–0
	3–1	57:30 – Aagaard (Olesen, Blichfeld) (PP)
Blümel (Sedlák, Červenka) (EN) – 59:08	4–1

4 min
Penalties
6 min
29
Shots
20

=== Slovakia vs Norway ===
16 May 2026; 12:20	Slovakia	2–1 (1–0, 0–1, 1–0)	Norway	BCF Arena, Fribourg; Attendance: 4,711

Game reference

Samuel Hlavaj
Goalies
Tobias Normann
Referees:
(United States) Sean MacFarlane
(Switzerland) Michael Tscherrig
Linesmen:
(Finland) Onni Hautamäki
(Finland) Tommi Niittylä

K. Pospíšil (M. Pospíšil, Kňažko) – 08:15	1–0
	1–1	39:47 – Koblar (Bakke Olsen)
Hrivík (Liška, Rosandić) – 48:07	2–1

6 min
Penalties
8 min
19
Shots
23

=== Italy vs Canada ===
16 May 2026; 16:20	Italy	0–6 (0–3, 0–3, 0–0)	Canada	BCF Arena, Fribourg; Attendance: 6,455

Game reference

Davide Fadani
Goalies
Cam Talbot
Referees:
(United States) Nolan Bloyer
(Austria) Christian Ofner
Linesmen:
(United Kingdom) Danny Beresford
(United States) John Rey

0–1	09:21 – Holloway (Tavares, O'Reilly)
0–2	10:08 – Minten (Brown, Mateychuk)
0–3	16:56 – Celebrini (Martone, Nurse)
0–4	22:09 – Celebrini (Cozens, Crosby)
0–5	38:14 – Bouchard (Celebrini, Vilardi) (PP)
0–6	38:39 – O'Reilly (Tavares, Holloway)

4 min
Penalties
6 min
19
Shots
41

=== Slovenia vs Czechia ===
16 May 2026; 20:20	Slovenia	3–2 OT (1–0, 0–2, 1–0) (OT: 1–0)	Czechia	BCF Arena, Fribourg; Attendance: 5,528

Game reference

Lukáš Horák
Goalies
Dominik Pavlát
Referees:
(Switzerland) Cedric Borga
(Germany) André Schrader
Linesmen:
(Latvia) Renārs Davidonis
(Germany) Patrick Laguzov

Török (Drozg, Sabolič) (PP) – 09:49	1–0
	1–1	24:44 – Kaut (Melovský)
	1–2	37:14 – Sedlák (Kempný, Mandát)
Kuralt (Goličič, Tičar) – 48:28	2–2
Mahkovec (Tičar) – 61:14	3–2

8 min
Penalties
6 min
17
Shots
34

=== Italy vs Slovakia ===
17 May 2026; 12:20	Italy	1–4 (0–1, 0–1, 1–2)	Slovakia	BCF Arena, Fribourg; Attendance: 3,881

Game reference

Jacob Smith
Goalies
Adam Gajan
Referees:
(United States) Nolan Bloyer
(Austria) Christian Ofner
Linesmen:
(United Kingdom) Danny Beresford
(United States) John Rey

	0–1	13:31 – Hrivík (Rosandić, Mešár)
	0–2	39:32 – Kmec (Čederle, Faško-Rudáš)
	0–3	40:30 – K. Pospíšil (M. Pospíšil, Faško-Rudáš)
Nitz – 45:03	1–3
	1–4	54:13 – Okuliar (M. Pospíšil, Chromiak) (PP)

8 min
Penalties
4 min
24
Shots
31

=== Denmark vs Sweden ===
17 May 2026; 16:20	Denmark	2–6 (0–2, 1–3, 1–1)	Sweden	BCF Arena, Fribourg; Attendance: 5,095

Game reference

Mads Søgaard
Goalies
Arvid Söderblom
Referees:
(Switzerland) Cedric Borga
(United States) Sean MacFarlane
Linesmen:
(Latvia) Renārs Davidonis
(United States) John Rey

	0–1	09:45 – Ekholm (Björck, Raymond)
	0–2	17:58 – Ekman-Larsson (Raymond, Stenberg)
	0–3	25:52 – Raymond (Persson, De la Rose) (PP)
	0–4	28:09 – Silfverberg (Grundström, Hägg)
Blichfeld (Bruggisser, Olesen) (PP) – 31:38	1–4
	1–5	33:45 – Björck (Stenberg, Ekman-Larsson) (PP)
Aagaard (Blichfeld, Olesen) (PP) – 51:48	2–5
	2–6	55:05 – Karlsson (Holmström, Johansson)

14 min
Penalties
14 min
16
Shots
29

=== Norway vs Slovenia ===
17 May 2026; 20:20	Norway	4–0 (1–0, 3–0, 0–0)	Slovenia	BCF Arena, Fribourg; Attendance: 3,103

Game reference

Henrik Haukeland
Goalies
Žan Us
Referees:
(Finland) Riku Brander
(Switzerland) Michael Tscherrig
Linesmen:
(United Kingdom) Danny Beresford
(Switzerland) Dominic Schlegel

Hurrød (Østby, Salsten) – 07:33	1–0
Berglund (Koblar, Solberg) (PP) – 25:27	2–0
Berglund (Østby, Haukeland) – 29:51	3–0
Berglund (Salsten, Johannesen) – 36:32	4–0

10 min
Penalties
10 min
25
Shots
11

=== Canada vs Denmark ===
18 May 2026; 16:20	Canada	5–1 (0–0, 0–0, 5–1)	Denmark	BCF Arena, Fribourg; Attendance: 6,367

Game reference

Jet Greaves
Goalies
Nikolaj Henriksen
Referees:
(Finland) Mikko Kaukokari
(Austria) Christian Ofner
Linesmen:
(Finland) Onni Hautamäki
(Germany) Patrick Laguzov

Martone (Crosby, Celebrini) – 40:28	1–0
Vilardi (Thomas) – 43:02	2–0
Mateychuk (Crosby, Celebrini) – 43:33	3—0
	3–1	50:12 – Olesen (Aagaard)
O'Reilly (Crosby, Martone) – 51:49	4–1
Wotherspoon (Crosby) – 59:31	5–1

2 min
Penalties
4 min
38
Shots
16

=== Sweden vs Czechia ===
18 May 2026; 20:20	Sweden	3–4 (2–3, 1–1, 0–0)	Czechia	BCF Arena, Fribourg; Attendance: 6,738

Game reference

Magnus Hellberg
Goalies
Josef Kořenář
Referees:
(Finland) Riku Brander
(Germany) André Schrader
Linesmen:
(United States) Shane Gustafson
(Switzerland) Dominic Schlegel

	0–1	03:04 – Blümel (Hronek, Galvas)
	0–2	12:24 – Kubalík (Cibulka, Kaut) (PP)
	0–3	13:00 – Flek (Voženílek, Tomášek)
Persson (Heineman, Holmström) (PP) – 15:34	1–3
Holmström (Persson, Heineman) (PP) – 17:45	2–3
	2–4	23:25 – Černoch (Beránek, Chmelař)
Ekman-Larsson (Raymond, Stenberg) (PP) – 26:00	3–4

10 min
Penalties
33 min
27
Shots
14

=== Italy vs Norway ===
19 May 2026; 16:20	Italy	0–4 (0–1, 0–2, 0–1)	Norway	BCF Arena, Fribourg; Attendance: 4,989

Game reference

Davide Fadani
Goalies
Henrik Haukeland
Referees:
(Canada) Jesse Gour
(Germany) Lukas Kohlmüller
Linesmen:
(Sweden) Gustav Jonsson
(Finland) Tommi Niittylä

0–1	11:32 – Bakke Olsen (Krogdahl, Øby Olsen)
0–2	31:40 – Steen (Salsten)
0–3	38:51 – Kåsastul (Øby Olsen, Krogdahl)
0–4	55:28 – Koblar (Martinsen, Pettersen)

8 min
Penalties
10 min
30
Shots
35

=== Slovenia vs Slovakia ===
19 May 2026; 20:20	Slovenia	4–5 GWS (1–2, 2–2, 1–0) (OT: 0–0) (SO: 0–1)	Slovakia	BCF Arena, Fribourg; Attendance: 3,146

Game reference

Lukáš Horák
Goalies
Adam Gajan
Referees:
(United States) Sean MacFarlane
(Switzerland) Michael Tscherrig
Linesmen:
(Latvia) Renārs Davidonis
(Sweden) Anders Nyqvist

	0–1	01:20 – Liška (Rosandić, Gajdoš)
Ograjenšek (Tičar, Ćosić) (PP2) – 15:17	1–1
	1–2	18:35 – Chromiak (Čederle, Gajdoš)
Tičar (Crnovič, Magovac) – 21:17	2–2
	2–3	25:46 – Mešár (Štrbák, Kňažko)
	2–4	30:09 – Faško-Rudáš (Liška, Mešár) (PP)
Drozg (Gregorc, Sabolič) (PP) – 37:48	3–4
Tičar (Drozg, Gregorc) – 59:29	4–4

Török (miss)
Drozg (miss)
Tičar
Sabolič (miss)
Shootout
(miss) Chromiak
Okuliar
(miss) Faško-Rudáš
K. Pospíšil
Mešár
6 min
Penalties
10 min
23
Shots
38

=== Czechia vs Italy ===
20 May 2026; 16:20	Czechia	3–1 (0–0, 0–1, 3–0)	Italy	BCF Arena, Fribourg; Attendance: 4,517

Game reference

Dominik Pavlát
Goalies
Damian Clara
Referees:
(Finland) Mikko Kaukokari
(Switzerland) Michael Tscherrig
Linesmen:
(Latvia) Renārs Davidonis
(Germany) Patrick Laguzov

	0–1	29:20 – Saracino (Frycklund)
Alscher (Ticháček, Blümel) – 45:14	1–1
Flek (Tomášek, Hronek) – 51:05	2–1
Kubalík (Tomášek) (EN) – 59:05	3–1

2 min
Penalties
8 min
58
Shots
15

=== Sweden vs Slovenia ===
20 May 2026; 20:20	Sweden	6–0 (2–0, 4–0, 0–0)	Slovenia	BCF Arena, Fribourg; Attendance: 4,814

Game reference

Arvid Söderblom
Goalies
Žan Us
Referees:
(Canada) Jesse Gour
(Austria) Christian Ofner
Linesmen:
(United States) Shane Gustafson
(Finland) Tommi Niittylä

Raymond (Grundström, Ekman-Larsson) – 03:26	1–0
De la Rose (Karlsson, Ekholm) – 19:07	2–0
De la Rose (Karlsson) – 25:55	3–0
Hägg (Ekman-Larsson, Frondell) – 26:58	4–0
Raymond (Ekman-Larsson, Stenberg) (PP) – 31:38	5–0
Ekholm (Frondell, Holmström) – 37:23	6–0

0 min
Penalties
6 min
45
Shots
16

=== Canada vs Norway ===
21 May 2026; 16:20	Canada	6–5 OT (2–2, 1–1, 2–2) (OT: 1–0)	Norway	BCF Arena, Fribourg; Attendance: 5,938

Game reference

Cam Talbot
Goalies
Tobias Normann
Referees:
(Slovakia) Tomáš Hronský
(Germany) André Schrader
Linesmen:
(Slovakia) Oto Durmis
(Sweden) Anders Nyqvist

	0–1	05:18 – Bakke Olsen (Vesterheim, Elvsveen)
	0–2	11:37 – Johannesen (Martinsen, Koblar)
Scheifele – 13:30	1–2
Scheifele (Wotherspoon, Vilardi) – 17:50	2–2
	2–3	23:34 – Steen (Vesterheim, Johannesen) (PP)
Vilardi (Scheifele, Bouchard) (PP) – 31:57	3–3
Cozens (Nurse) (SH) – 40:31	4–3
	4–4	48:09 – Kåsastul (Steen)
	4–5	49:57 – Koblar (Pettersen, Johannesen)
O'Reilly (Celebrini, Bouchard) (EA) – 58:21	5–5
Scheifele (Bouchard, Celebrini) – 60:29	6–5

8 min
Penalties
10 min
42
Shots
19

=== Denmark vs Slovakia ===
21 May 2026; 20:20	Denmark	1–5 (0–1, 0–2, 1–2)	Slovakia	BCF Arena, Fribourg; Attendance: 4,734

Game reference

Mads Søgaard
Nicolaj Henriksen
Goalies
Samuel Hlavaj
Referees:
(Sweden) Tobias Björk
(Germany) Lukas Kohlmüller
Linesmen:
(Sweden) Gustav Jonsson
(Norway) Njaal Søstumoen

	0–1	09:28 – Chromiak (Pospíšil, Okuliar) (PP)
	0–2	20:56 – Liška (Okuliar, Hrivík)
	0–3	26:44 – Okuliar (Hrivík, Liška)
Aagaard (Russell, Jensen Aabo) – 41:43	1–3
	1–4	43:51 – Pospíšil (Kmec, Kňažko)
	1–5	53:05 – Čederle (Chromiak)

8 min
Penalties
2 min
14
Shots
44

=== Canada vs Slovenia ===
22 May 2026; 16:20	Canada	3–1 (1–0, 1–0, 1–1)	Slovenia	BCF Arena, Fribourg; Attendance: 6,209

Game reference

Jet Greaves
Goalies
Žan Us
Referees:
(Finland) Mikko Kaukokari
(Germany) Lukas Kohlmüller
Linesmen:
(Sweden) Gustav Jonsson
(Finland) Tommi Niittylä

Mateychuk (Minten, Finnie) – 11:07	1–0
Cozens (Nurse, Crosby) – 33:14	2–0
Finnie (Rielly, Brown) – 46:41	3–0
	3–1	58:55 – Bohinc (Goličič)

2 min
Penalties
2 min
32
Shots
14

=== Sweden vs Italy ===
22 May 2026; 20:20	Sweden	3–0 (2–0, 1–0, 0–0)	Italy	BCF Arena, Fribourg; Attendance: 5,091

Game reference

Magnus Hellberg
Goalies
Damian Clara
Referees:
(Slovakia) Tomáš Hronský
(Switzerland) Michael Tscherrig
Linesmen:
(Slovakia) Oto Durmis
(Germany) Patrick Laguzov

Grundström (Brännström, Berglund) – 09:09	1–0
Stenberg (Björck, Raymond) (PP) – 19:27	2–0
Stenberg (Björck, Raymond) – 28:04	3–0

6 min
Penalties
8 min
34
Shots
12

=== Denmark vs Slovenia ===
23 May 2026; 12:20	Denmark	4–0 (0–0, 2–0, 2–0)	Slovenia	BCF Arena, Fribourg; Attendance: 4,604

Game reference

Mads Søgaard
Goalies
Lukáš Horák
Referees:
(Sweden) Tobias Björk
(Slovakia) Tomáš Hronský
Linesmen:
(Finland) Tommi Niittylä
(Norway) Njaal Søstumoen

Blichfeld (Aagaard, Olesen) (PP) – 34:11	1–0
Russell (Bruggisser, Aagaard) – 38:43	2–0
Russell (Aagaard, Olesen) – 58:13	3–0
Aagaard (Russell, Olesen) (EN) – 59:45	4–0

6 min
Penalties
2 min
30
Shots
13

=== Slovakia vs Czechia ===
23 May 2026; 16:20	Slovakia	2–3 (0–1, 2–1, 0–1)	Czechia	BCF Arena, Fribourg; Attendance: 6,811

Game reference

Samuel Hlavaj
Goalies
Josef Kořenář
Referees:
(Canada) Taylor Burzminski
(Canada) Jesse Gour
Linesmen:
(Canada) Brian Birkhoff
(Sweden) Anders Nyqvist

	0–1	08:09 – Voženílek (Cibulka, Kempný)
Hrivík (Kňažko, Okuliar) – 31:30	1–1
	1–2	34:04 – Kaut (Sedlák, Červenka) (PP)
Chromiak – 37:50	2–2
	2–3	52:02 – Červenka (Kaut)

8 min
Penalties
4 min
30
Shots
18

=== Norway vs Sweden ===
23 May 2026; 20:20	Norway	3–2 (1–0, 1–1, 1–1)	Sweden	BCF Arena, Fribourg; Attendance: 5,417

Game reference

Henrik Haukeland
Goalies
Arvid Söderblom
Referees:
(Finland) Mikko Kaukokari
(Czech Republic) Jiří Ondráček
Linesmen:
(Canada) Mitchell Gibbs
(Germany) Patrick Laguzov

Steen (Bakke Olsen, Vesterheim) (PP) – 09:32	1–0
	1–1	22:23 – Stenberg (Berglund, Björck) (PP)
Steen (H. Østrem Salsten) (SH) – 33:15	2–1
	2–2	43:10 – Raymond
E. Østrem Salsten (Ronnild) (SH) – 49:11	3–2

14 min
Penalties
10 min
14
Shots
34

=== Denmark vs Italy ===
24 May 2026; 16:20	Denmark	3–2 GWS (2–0, 0–2, 0–0) (OT: 0–0) (SO: 1–0)	Italy	BCF Arena, Fribourg; Attendance: 5,157

Game reference

Mads Søgaard
Goalies
Davide Fadani
Referees:
(Canada) Taylor Burzminski
(Canada) Jesse Gour
Linesmen:
(Slovakia) Oto Durmis
(Canada) Mitchell Gibbs

Wejse (Bruggisser, Schmidt-Svejstrup) – 02:33	1–0
Aagaard (Olesen, Larsen) – 02:49	2–0
	2–1	21:17 – Purdeller (Frycklund, Buono) (PP)
	2–2	35:34 – Purdeller (Frycklund, Trivellato)

Olesen (miss)
Blichfeld (miss)
Aagaard (miss)
Russell
Storm (miss)
Shootout
(miss) Mantenuto
(miss) Purdeller
(miss) Misley
(miss) Bradley
(miss) Frycklund
8 min
Penalties
8 min
29
Shots
37

=== Slovakia vs Canada ===
24 May 2026; 20:20	Slovakia	1–5 (0–1, 1–0, 0–4)	Canada	BCF Arena, Fribourg; Attendance: 6,939

Game reference

Samuel Hlavaj
Goalies
Jet Greaves
Referees:
(Sweden) Tobias Björk
(Czech Republic) Jiří Ondráček
Linesmen:
(Sweden) Gustav Jonsson
(Norway) Njaal Søstumoen

	0–1	14:28 – Cozens (Crosby, Celebrini)
Pospíšil (Radivojevič, Rosandić) – 28:47	1–1
	1–2	42:14 – Vilardi (Tavares, Thomas) (PP)
	1–3	44:54 – Tavares (O'Reilly, Rielly)
	1–4	47:36 – O'Reilly (Bouchard) (SH)
	1–5	49:21 – Celebrini (Vilardi, Scheifele)

4 min
Penalties
8 min
32
Shots
29

=== Czechia vs Norway ===
25 May 2026; 16:20	Czechia	1–4 (1–2, 0–0, 0–2)	Norway	BCF Arena, Fribourg; Attendance: 6,210

Game reference

Dominik Pavlát
Goalies
Henrik Haukeland
Referees:
(Sweden) Christoffer Holm
(Slovakia) Tomáš Hronský
Linesmen:
(Canada) Mitchell Gibbs
(Sweden) Gustav Jonsson

	0–1	02:59 – H. Salsten
	0–2	06:49 – Brandsegg-Nygård (Vesterheim)
Chmelař – 15:47	1–2
	1–3	48:10 – Rønnild (E. Salsten, Pettersen)
	1–4	54:17 – Brandsegg-Nygård (Østby, Koblar)

0 min
Penalties
6 min
18
Shots
26

=== Slovenia vs Italy ===
25 May 2026; 20:20	Slovenia	5–1 (0–0, 3–1, 2–0)	Italy	BCF Arena, Fribourg; Attendance: 4,436

Game reference

Lukáš Horák
Goalies
Damian Clara
Referees:
(Germany) Lukas Kohlmüller
(Norway) Marcus Wannerstedt
Linesmen:
(Canada) Brian Birkhoff
(Sweden) Anders Nyqvist

	0–1	22:34 – Pietroniro (Purdeller, Mantenuto)
Török (Mahkovec) – 28:09	1–1
Drozg (Mahkovec, Sabolič) (PP) – 30:03	2–1
Drozg (Mahkovec, Gregorc) (PP) – 39:54	3–1
Mahkovec (Török, Sabolič) – 47:18	4–1
Jezovšek (Ograjenšek, Tičar) (PP2) – 51:24	5–1

6 min
Penalties
10 min
36
Shots
28

=== Norway vs Denmark ===
26 May 2026; 12:20	Norway	4–3 OT (1–0, 2–2, 0–1) (OT: 1–0)	Denmark	BCF Arena, Fribourg; Attendance: 4,062

Game reference

Henrik Haukeland
Goalies
Nicolaj Henriksen
Referees:
(Canada) Taylor Burzminski
(Canada) Jesse Gour
Linesmen:
(Slovakia) Oto Durmis
(Czech Republic) Lukáš Rampir

Koblar (Martinsen, Brandsegg-Nygård) – 11:55	1–0
	1–1	27:53 – Blichfeld
Martinsen (T. Olsen, Hurrod) (PP) – 30:42	2–1
Koblar (Krogdahl, Kåsastul) – 34:00	3–1
	3–2	35:02 – Blichfeld (Olesen, Bruggisser) (PP)
	3–3	59:58 – Russell (True, Aagaard) (EA)
Brandsegg-Nygård (Hurrod, Bakke Olsen) – 60:13	4–3

12 min
Penalties
39 min
26
Shots
21

=== Sweden vs Slovakia ===
26 May 2026; 16:20	Sweden	4–2 (1–1, 2–1, 1–0)	Slovakia	BCF Arena, Fribourg; Attendance: 6,143

Game reference

Magnus Hellberg
Goalies
Samuel Hlavaj
Referees:
(Czech Republic) Jiří Ondráček
(Norway) Marcus Wannerstedt
Linesmen:
(Canada) Brian Birkhoff
(Czech Republic) Jiří Ondráček

	0–1	04:54 – Chromiak (Sýkora, Koch)
Frondell (Persson, Ekholm) (EA) – 16:01	1–1
Silfverberg (Grundström, Larsson) – 22:50	2–1
Stenberg (Raymond, Björck) – 30:56	3–1
	3–2	36:39 – Hrivík (Faško-Rudáš, Rosandić) (PP)
Ekman-Larsson (EN) – 58:45	4–2

8 min
Penalties
6 min
19
Shots
24

=== Czechia vs Canada ===
26 May 2026; 20:20	Czechia	2–3 (1–0, 1–1, 0–2)	Canada	BCF Arena, Fribourg; Attendance: 7,500

Game reference

Dominik Pavlát
Goalies
Jet Greaves
Referees:
(Sweden) Tobias Björk
(Sweden) Christoffer Holm
Linesmen:
(Sweden) Gustav Jonsson
(Sweden) Anders Nyqvist

Alscher (Sedlák, Flek) – 06:03	1–0
Kubalík (Melovský) – 28:18	2–0
	2–1	34:02 – Celebrini (Crosby, Cozens)
	2–2	47:14 – Celebrini (Crosby, Wotherspoon)
	2–3	49:25 – Tavares (Wotherspoon, Bouchard)

4 min
Penalties
6 min
21
Shots
25
