= 2025–26 IIHF European Cup of Nations =

Tournament details
- Host countries: Germany; France; Poland; Lithuania; Estonia; Slovakia; Hungary; Romania
- Venues: 5 (in 5 host cities)
- Dates: 6–9 November 2025; 8–14 December 2025; 2–8 February 2026
- Teams: 18

The 2025–26 IIHF European Cup of Nations was the first edition of the IIHF European Cup of Nations organised by the International Ice Hockey Federation (IIHF).

The 18 teams were split into groups and played in the three international breaks in various venues.

== Group A tournament ==
Group A
Tournament details
- Host country: Germany
- City: Landshut
- Venue: 1 (in 1 host city)
- Dates: 6–9 November
- Teams: 4

Tournament statistics
- Games played: 6
- Goals scored: 34 (5.67 per game)
- Attendance: 13,062 (2,177 per game)
- Scoring leader: (Slovakia) Matúš Sukeľ (5 points)

Official website
- Website

=== Standings ===
Pos	Team	Pld	W	OTW	OTL	L	GF	GA	GD	Pts
1	Germany (H)	3	2	0	0	1	9	6	+3	6 (Note: Germany 3–0 Slovakia)
2	Slovakia	3	2	0	0	1	10	6	+4	6
3	Latvia	3	1	0	0	2	6	10	−4	3 (Note: Latvia 4–2 Austria)
4	Austria	3	1	0	0	2	9	12	−3	3

Source: IIHF
Rules for classification: 1) points; 2) head-to-head points; 3) head-to-head goal difference; 4) head-to-head number of goals scored.
(H) Host

=== Results ===
All times are local (UTC+1).

6 November 2025; 12:15	Austria	2–6 (0–5, 1–0, 1–1)	Slovakia	Fanatec Arena, Landshut; Attendance: 508

Game reference

David Kickert
Goalies
Stanislav Škorvánek
Referees:
(Hungary) Gergely Gebei
(Germany) Sirko Hunnius
Linesmen:
(Germany) Maksim Cepik
(Germany) Jonas Reinold

	0–1	01:50 – Čajkovič (Čederle, Rosandić)
	0–2	04:10 – Cehlárik (Kňažko, Lantoši) (PP)
	0–3	06:40 – Sukeľ (Okuliar, Takáč)
	0–4	10:29 – Čacho (Čiernik, Ivan)
	0–5	18:20 – Sukeľ (Čederle, Takáč) (PP)
Schneider (Zwerger, Schnetzer) – 35:01	1–5
Thaler (Zündel, Schneider) – 48:25	2–5
	2–6	58:17 – Sukeľ (Takáč, Rosandić) (SH)

8 min
Penalties
10 min
29
Shots
22

6 November 2025; 19:45	Germany	4–1 (2–1, 0–0, 2–0)	Latvia	Fanatec Arena, Landshut; Attendance: 2,107

Game reference

Mathias Niederberger
Goalies
Ivars Punnenovs
Referees:
(Norway) Oskar Ovstedal
(Germany) Marian Rohatsch
Linesmen:
(Germany) Vincent Brüggemann
(Germany) Patrick Laguzov

	0–1	05:40 – Smirnovs (Daugaviņš)
Kahun (Fischbuch, Kälble) – 06:16	1–1
Ehliz (Sinn, Müller) – 11:28	2–1
Sinn (Ehliz, Fischbuch) (PP) – 43:55	3–1
Michaelis (Wagner) (EN) – 57:16	4–1

8 min
Penalties
4 min
33
Shots
20

8 November 2025; 11:00	Slovakia	4–1 (2–0, 1–0, 1–1)	Latvia	Fanatec Arena, Landshut; Attendance: 1,514

Game reference

Eugen Rabčan
Goalies
Gustavs Grigals
Referees:
(Norway) Oskar Ovstedal
(Germany) Marian Rohatsch
Linesmen:
(Germany) Maksim Cepik
(Germany) Joshua Römer

Cehlárik (Lantoši, Hrivík) – 02:50	1–0
Ivan (Okuliar, Čacho) – 10:50	2–0
Sukeľ (Takáč, Hrivík) – 34:27	3–0
Sukeľ (Takáč, Okuliar) – 41:22	4–0
	4–1	43:51 – Smirnovs (Krastenbergs, Daugaviņš)

6 min
Penalties
6 min
32
Shots
23

8 November 2025; 18:45	Germany	2–5 (0–1, 1–1, 0–3)	Austria	Fanatec Arena, Landshut; Attendance: 4,200

Game reference

Dustin Strahlmeier
Goalies
Atte Tolvanen
Referees:
(Hungary) Gergely Gebei
(Germany) Christopher Schadewaldt
Linesmen:
(Germany) Patrick Laguzov
(Germany) Jonas Reinold

	0–1	14:25 – Rohrer (Huber) (SH)
Müller (Brunnhuber, Fleischer) – 29:32	1–1
	1–2	31:52 – Huber (Zündel, Wallner)
	1–3	40:49 – Wallner (Rohrer)
	1–4	51:31 – Rohrer (Hackl, Wallner)
	1–5	54:50 – Zwerger (Haudum, Schneider)
Preto (Fleischer, Brunnhuber) – 58:03	2–5

6 min
Penalties
6 min
24
Shots
26

9 November 2025; 11:00	Latvia	4–2 (0–0, 1–0, 3–2)	Austria	Fanatec Arena, Landshut; Attendance: 1,400

Game reference

Ivars Punnenovs
Goalies
Florian Vorauer
Referees:
(Hungary) Gergely Gebei
(Norway) Oskar Ovstedal
Linesmen:
(Germany) Vincent Brüggemann
(Germany) Patrick Laguzov

Smirnovs (Sējējs, Daugaviņš) – 31:05	1–0
Krastenbergs (Šmits, Smirnovs) (PP) – 42:09	2–0
Indrašis (Brunnhuber, Bukarts) – 49:02	3–0
	3–1	51:58 – Söllinger (Kainz)
	3–2	52:41 – Schneider (Wolf, Nickl)
Krastenbergs (Daugaviņš, Smirnovs) (EN) – 59:16	4–2

4 min
Penalties
8 min
35
Shots
21

9 November 2025; 14:45	Germany	3–0 (2–0, 1–0, 0–0)	Slovakia	Fanatec Arena, Landshut; Attendance: 3,333

Game reference

Maximilian Franzreb
Goalies
Stanislav Škorvánek
Referees:
(Germany) Sirko Hunnius
(Germany) Christopher Schadewaldt
Linesmen:
(Germany) Maksim Cepik
(Germany) Joshua Römer

Tuomie – 10:02	1–0
Rossmy (Kastner, Wagner) – 11:10	2–0
Wagner (Hüttl, Fleischer) – 22:59	3–0

10 min
Penalties
14 min
27
Shots
28

== Group B tournament ==
Group B
Tournament details
- Host country: France
- City: Épinal
- Venue: 1 (in 1 host city)
- Dates: 6–8 November
- Teams: 4

Tournament statistics
- Games played: 6
- Goals scored: 33 (5.5 per game)

Official website
- Website

=== Standings ===
Pos	Team	Pld	W	OTW	OTL	L	GF	GA	GD	Pts
1	France (H)	3	2	0	0	1	9	7	+2	6
2	Norway	3	1	1	0	1	7	6	+1	5
3	Denmark	3	1	0	1	1	8	7	+1	4
4	Hungary	3	1	0	0	2	9	13	−4	3

Source: IIHF
Rules for classification: 1) points; 2) head-to-head points; 3) head-to-head goal difference; 4) head-to-head number of goals scored.
(H) Host

=== Results ===
All times are local (UTC+1).

6 November 2025; 16:00	Hungary	2–4 (0–1, 0–1, 1–2)	Norway	Patinoire de Poissompré, Épinal

6 November 2025; 20:45	France	3–1 (1–0, 1–0, 1–1)	Denmark	Patinoire de Poissompré, Épinal

7 November 2025; 16:00	Denmark	5–1 (2–0, 1–0, 2–1)	Hungary	Patinoire de Poissompré, Épinal

7 November 2025; 20:45	Norway	0–2 (0–0, 0–0, 0–2)	France	Patinoire de Poissompré, Épinal

8 November 2025; 15:00	Denmark	2–3 OT (1–0, 0–2, 1–0) (OT: 0–1)	Norway	Patinoire de Poissompré, Épinal

8 November 2025; 19:30	France	4–6 (1–3, 0–2, 3–1)	Hungary	Patinoire de Poissompré, Épinal

== Group C tournament ==
Group C
Tournament details
- Host country: Poland
- City: Sosnowiec
- Venue: 1 (in 1 host city)
- Dates: 6–8 November
- Teams: 4

Tournament statistics
- Games played: 6
- Goals scored: 32 (5.33 per game)

Official website
- Website

=== Standings ===
Pos	Team	Pld	W	OTW	OTL	L	GF	GA	GD	Pts
1	Poland (H)	3	2	0	1	0	7	5	+2	7
2	Italy	3	1	1	0	1	10	10	0	5 (Note: Italy 3–2 Slovenia)
3	Slovenia	3	1	1	0	1	10	6	+4	5
4	Great Britain	3	0	0	1	2	5	11	−6	1

Source: IIHF
Rules for classification: 1) points; 2) head-to-head points; 3) head-to-head goal difference; 4) head-to-head number of goals scored.
(H) Host

=== Results ===
All times are local (UTC+1).

6 November 2025; 16:15	Slovenia	5–1 (3–0, 2–1, 0–0)	Great Britain	Arena Sosnowiec, Sosnowiec

6 November 2025; 19:45	Poland	4–2 (3–1, 1–0, 0–1)	Italy	Arena Sosnowiec, Sosnowiec

7 November 2025; 17:00	Great Britain	4–5 OT (1–1, 2–3, 1–0) (OT: 0–1)	Italy	Arena Sosnowiec, Sosnowiec

7 November 2025; 20:45	Poland	2–3 OT (2–1, 0–0, 0–1) (OT: 0–1)	Slovenia	Arena Sosnowiec, Sosnowiec

8 November 2025; 16:15	Italy	3–2 (1–0, 1–2, 1–0)	Slovenia	Arena Sosnowiec, Sosnowiec

8 November 2025; 19:45	Poland	1–0 (1–0, 0–0, 0–0)	Great Britain	Arena Sosnowiec, Sosnowiec

== Group D tournament ==
Group D
Tournament details
- Host country: Lithuania
- City: Elektrėnai
- Venue: 1 (in 1 host city)
- Dates: 6–8 November
- Teams: 3

Tournament statistics
- Games played: 3
- Goals scored: 11 (3.67 per game)

Official website
- Website

=== Standings ===
Pos	Team	Pld	W	OTW	OTL	L	GF	GA	GD	Pts
1	Lithuania (H)	2	2	0	0	0	4	2	+2	6
2	Ukraine	2	1	0	0	1	5	3	+2	3
3	Romania	2	0	0	0	2	2	6	−4	0

Source: IIHF
Rules for classification: 1) points; 2) head-to-head points; 3) head-to-head goal difference; 4) head-to-head number of goals scored.
(H) Host

=== Results ===
All times are local (UTC+2).

6 November 2025; 18:30	Ukraine	1–2 (1–0, 0–2, 0–0)	Lithuania	Elektrėnai Ice Palace, Elektrėnai

7 November 2025; 18:30	Romania	1–4 (0–0, 1–1, 0–3)	Ukraine	Elektrėnai Ice Palace, Elektrėnai

8 November 2025; 18:30	Lithuania	2–1 (1–0, 1–0, 0–1)	Romania	Elektrėnai Ice Palace, Elektrėnai

== Group E tournament ==
Group E
Tournament details
- Host country: Estonia
- City: Tallinn
- Venue: 1 (in 1 host city)
- Dates: 6–8 November
- Teams: 3

Tournament statistics
- Games played: 3
- Goals scored: 22 (7.33 per game)

Official website
- Website

=== Standings ===
Pos	Team	Pld	W	OTW	OTL	L	GF	GA	GD	Pts
1	Estonia (H)	2	2	0	0	0	14	2	+12	6
2	Spain	2	1	0	0	1	6	10	−4	3
3	Netherlands	2	0	0	0	2	2	10	−8	0

Source: IIHF
Rules for classification: 1) points; 2) head-to-head points; 3) head-to-head goal difference; 4) head-to-head number of goals scored.
(H) Host

=== Results ===
All times are local (UTC+2).

6 November 2025; 18:00	Estonia	8–2 (0–1, 4–1, 4–0)	Spain	Tondiraba Ice Hall, Tallinn

7 November 2025; 18:00	Spain	4–2 (4–0, 0–2, 0–0)	Netherlands	Tondiraba Ice Hall, Tallinn

8 November 2025; 18:00	Netherlands	0–6 (0–1, 0–2, 0–3)	Estonia	Tondiraba Ice Hall, Tallinn

== Group F tournament ==
Group F
Tournament details
- Host country: Slovakia
- City: Banská Bystrica
- Venue: 1 (in 1 host city)
- Dates: 10–12 December
- Teams: 3

Tournament statistics
- Games played: 3
- Goals scored: 20 (6.67 per game)

Official website
- Website

=== Standings ===
Pos	Team	Pld	W	OTW	OTL	L	GF	GA	GD	Pts
1	Slovakia (H)	2	1	1	0	0	10	6	+4	5
2	Latvia	2	1	0	1	0	6	3	+3	4
3	Norway	2	0	0	0	2	4	11	−7	0

Rules for classification: 1) points; 2) head-to-head points; 3) head-to-head goal difference; 4) head-to-head number of goals scored.
(H) Host

=== Results ===
All times are local (UTC+1).

10 December 2025; 18:00	Slovakia	7–4 (3–2, 3–1, 1–1)	Norway	Banská Bystrica Ice Stadium, Banská Bystrica

11 December 2025; 18:00	Norway	0–4 (0–0, 0–1, 0–3)	Latvia	Banská Bystrica Ice Stadium, Banská Bystrica

12 December 2025; 18:00	Slovakia	3–2 OT (0–1, 1–0, 1–1) (OT: 1–0)	Latvia	Banská Bystrica Ice Stadium, Banská Bystrica

== Group G tournament ==
Group G
Tournament details
- Host country: Hungary
- City: Budapest
- Venue: 1 (in 1 host city)
- Dates: 12–14 December
- Teams: 4

Tournament statistics
- Games played: 6
- Goals scored: 33 (5.5 per game)

Official website
- Website

=== Standings ===
Pos	Team	Pld	W	OTW	OTL	L	GF	GA	GD	Pts
1	Poland	3	2	1	0	0	12	7	+5	8
2	France	3	2	0	1	0	10	7	+3	7
3	Italy	3	1	0	0	2	11	12	−1	3
4	Hungary (H)	3	0	0	0	3	5	12	−7	0

Rules for classification: 1) points; 2) head-to-head points; 3) head-to-head goal difference; 4) head-to-head number of goals scored.
(H) Host

=== Results ===
All times are local (UTC+1).

12 December 2025; 15:00	Poland	4–3 GWS (2–1, 0–0, 1–2) (OT: 0–0) (SO: 1–0)	France	Tüskecsarnok, Budapest

12 December 2025; 19:00	Hungary	1–2 (1–1, 0–1, 0–0)	Italy	Tüskecsarnok, Budapest

13 December 2025; 15:00	Italy	2–4 (1–2, 1–2, 0–0)	Poland	Tüskecsarnok, Budapest

13 December 2025; 19:00	Hungary	2–5 (0–0, 2–2, 0–3)	France	Tüskecsarnok, Budapest

14 December 2025; 12:30	France	2–1 (0–0, 1–0, 1–1)	Italy	Tüskecsarnok, Budapest

14 December 2025; 16:30	Hungary	2–5 (0–1, 1–1, 1–3)	Poland	Tüskecsarnok, Budapest

== Group H tournament ==
Group H
Tournament details
- Host country: Romania
- City: Bucharest
- Venue: 1 (in 1 host city)
- Dates: 11–13 December
- Teams: 2

Tournament statistics
- Games played: 3
- Goals scored: 15 (5 per game)

Official website
- Website

=== Standings ===
Pos	Team	Pld	W	OTW	OTL	L	GF	GA	GD	Pts
1	Ukraine	3	2	1	0	0	10	7	+3	8
2	Romania (H)	3	0	0	1	2	7	10	−3	1

Rules for classification: 1) points; 2) head-to-head points; 3) head-to-head goal difference; 4) head-to-head number of goals scored.
(H) Host

=== Results ===
All times are local (UTC+2).

11 December 2025; 19:30	Romania	2–3 (0–0, 0–2, 2–1)	Ukraine	Berceni Arena, Bucharest

12 December 2025; 19:30	Ukraine	2–1 (1–1, 1–0, 0–0)	Romania	Berceni Arena, Bucharest

13 December 2025; 19:30	Romania	4–5 OT (0–2, 4–0, 0–2) (OT: 0–1)	Ukraine	Berceni Arena, Bucharest

== Group I tournament ==
Group I
Tournament details
- Host country: Great Britain
- City: Edinburgh
- Venue: 1 (in 1 host city)
- Dates: 5–7 February
- Teams: 4

Tournament statistics
- Games played: 6
- Goals scored: 39 (6.5 per game)

=== Standings ===
Pos	Team	Pld	W	OTW	OTL	L	GF	GA	GD	Pts
1	Ukraine	3	2	0	1	0	10	7	+3	7
2	Slovenia	3	2	0	0	1	10	9	+1	6
3	Great Britain (H)	3	1	1	0	1	10	10	0	5
4	Poland	3	0	0	0	3	9	13	−4	0

Rules for classification: 1) points; 2) head-to-head points; 3) head-to-head goal difference; 4) head-to-head number of goals scored.
(H) Host

=== Results ===
All times are local (UTC±0).

5 February 2026; 14:00	Poland	3–4 (1–1, 0–3, 2–0)	Slovenia	Murrayfield Ice Rink, Edinburgh

5 February 2026; 18:30	Great Britain	3–2 OT (0–1, 2–1, 0–0) (OT: 0–1)	Ukraine	Murrayfield Ice Rink, Edinburgh

6 February 2026; 14:00	Ukraine	4–2 (1–2, 2–0, 1–0)	Poland	Murrayfield Ice Rink, Edinburgh

6 February 2026; 18:30	Great Britain	2–4 (0–0, 1–1, 1–3)	Slovenia	Murrayfield Ice Rink, Edinburgh

7 February 2026; 14:00	Slovenia	2–4 (0–2, 0–1, 2–1)	Ukraine	Murrayfield Ice Rink, Edinburgh

7 February 2026; 18:30	Great Britain	5–4 (2–0, 1–3, 2–1)	Poland	Murrayfield Ice Rink, Edinburgh

== Group J tournament ==
Group J
Tournament details
- Host country: Norway
- City: Oslo
- Venue: 1 (in 1 host city)
- Dates: 5–7 February
- Teams: 3

Tournament statistics
- Games played: 3
- Goals scored: 21 (7 per game)

=== Standings ===
Pos	Team	Pld	W	OTW	OTL	L	GF	GA	GD	Pts
1	Norway (H)	2	1	1	0	0	10	6	+4	5
2	Austria	2	1	0	0	1	6	6	0	3
3	Hungary	2	0	0	1	1	5	9	−4	1

Rules for classification: 1) points; 2) head-to-head points; 3) head-to-head goal difference; 4) head-to-head number of goals scored.
(H) Host

=== Results ===
All times are local (UTC+1).

5 February 2026; 19:00	Hungary	4–5 OT (1–2, 1–1, 2–1) (OT: 0–1)	Norway	Nye Jordal Amfi, Oslo

6 February 2026; 19:00	Austria	4–1 (1–1, 1–0, 2–0)	Hungary	Nye Jordal Amfi, Oslo

7 February 2026; 16:00	Norway	5–2 (4–1, 1–1, 0–0)	Austria	Nye Jordal Amfi, Oslo

== Group K tournament ==
Group K
Tournament details
- Host country: Romania
- City: Brașov
- Venue: 1 (in 1 host city)
- Dates: 5–7 February
- Teams: 3

Tournament statistics
- Games played: 3
- Goals scored: 17 (5.67 per game)

=== Standings ===
Pos	Team	Pld	W	OTW	OTL	L	GF	GA	GD	Pts
1	Romania (H)	2	2	0	0	0	9	2	+7	6
2	Spain	2	1	0	0	1	5	8	−3	3
3	Lithuania	2	0	0	0	2	3	7	−4	0

Rules for classification: 1) points; 2) head-to-head points; 3) head-to-head goal difference; 4) head-to-head number of goals scored.
(H) Host

=== Results ===
All times are local (UTC+2).

5 February 2026; 18:30	Romania	3–1 (1–0, 1–0, 1–1)	Lithuania	Brașov Olympic Ice Rink, Brașov

6 February 2026; 18:30	Lithuania	2–4 (1–3, 0–1, 1–0)	Spain	Brașov Olympic Ice Rink, Brașov

7 February 2026; 18:30	Spain	1–6 (0–2, 1–2, 0–2)	Romania	Brașov Olympic Ice Rink, Brașov
