= 2018 World Junior Ice Hockey Championships – Division I =

International ice hockey tournament

2018 IIHF U20 World Championship Division I

Tournament details
- Host countries: France; Slovenia
- Venues: 3 (in 3 host cities)
- Dates: 10–16 December 2017; 9–15 December 2017
- Teams: 12

The 2018 World Junior Ice Hockey Championship Division I consisted of two tiered groups of six teams each: the second-tier Division I A and the third-tier Division I B. For each tier's tournament, the first-placed team was promoted to a higher division, while the last-placed team was relegated to a lower division.

The tournaments were played in a round-robin tournament format, with two points allotted for a win, one additional point for a regulation win, and one point for an overtime or game winning shots loss.

To be eligible as a junior player in these tournaments, a player couldn't be born earlier than 1998.

== Division I A ==
2018 IIHF U20 World Championship Division I A
Tournament details
- Host country: France
- Cities: Courchevel, Méribel
- Venues: 2 (in 2 host cities)
- Dates: 10–16 December 2017
- Teams: 6

Tournament statistics
- Games played: 15
- Goals scored: 82 (5.47 per game)
- Attendance: 6,023 (402 per game)
- Scoring leader: (Kazakhstan) Artur Gatiyatov (7 points)

Official website
- www.iihf.com

The Division I A tournament was played in Courchevel and Méribel, France, from 10 to 16 December 2017.

As a result of the tournament, Kazakhstan were promoted to Top Division and Hungary were relegated to Division I B for 2019.

=== Participating teams ===
Team	Qualification
Latvia	placed 10th in Top Division last year and were relegated
Germany	placed 2nd in Division I A last year
France	hosts; placed 3rd in Division I A last year
Kazakhstan	placed 4th in Division I A last year
Austria	placed 5th in Division I A last year
Hungary	placed 1st in Division I B last year and were promoted

=== Final standings ===
Pos	Team	Pld	W	OTW	OTL	L	GF	GA	GD	Pts	Promotion or relegation
1	Kazakhstan	5	3	2	0	0	20	10	+10	13	Promoted to the 2019 Top Division
2	Latvia	5	3	1	1	0	13	5	+8	12	
3	Germany	5	3	0	1	1	17	7	+10	10	
4	France (H)	5	1	1	1	2	11	15	−4	6	
5	Austria	5	1	0	0	4	10	20	−10	3	
6	Hungary	5	0	0	1	4	11	25	−14	1	Relegated to the 2019 Division I B

Source: IIHF
Rules for classification: 1) points; 2) head-to-head points; 3) head-to-head goal difference; 4) head-to-head number of goals scored; 5) result against closest best-ranked team outside tied teams; 6) result against second-best ranked team outside tied teams; 7) seeding before tournament.
(H) Host

=== Match results ===
All times are local (Central European Time – UTC+1).

10 December 2017; 14:30	Kazakhstan	3–2 OT (0–0, 0–1, 2–1) (OT: 1–0)	Germany	Courchevel Arena; Attendance: 103

Game reference

Denis Karatayev
Goalies
Mirko Pantkowski
Referee:
(Slovakia) Miroslav Štefík
Linesmen:
(Belgium) Frédéric Monnaie
(Poland) Mariusz Smura

	0–1	20:58 – Jahnke (Bokk)
Sam. Daniyar (Orekhov) (PP) – 42:43	1–1
Sam. Daniyar (Beketayev) (PP2) – 45:11	2–1
	2–2	58:43 – Gawanke (Walther)
Gatiyatov (Orekhov) – 63:57	3–2

8 min
Penalties
22 min
37
Shots
34

10 December 2017; 18:00	Austria	1–6 (0–2, 1–1, 0–3)	France	Courchevel Arena; Attendance: 695

Game reference

Jakob Holzer
Goalies
Gaëtan Richard
Referee:
(Norway) Roy Stian Hansen
Linesmen:
(Switzerland) David Obwegeser
(Belarus) Victor Zinchenko

	0–1	02:40 – Sarlin (Bougro, Texier) (PP)
	0–2	19:54 – Boudon (Petit, Munoz) (PP)
Rossi (Würschl, Witting) – 21:13	1–2
	1–3	37:24 – Olive (Mermoux, Petit)
	1–4	43:16 – Sarliève-Fonfraid (Munoz, Texier)
	1–5	46:16 – Boudon (Melin, Petit) (PP)
	1–6	53:55 – Bougro (Guebey, Texier)

24 min
Penalties
8 min
19
Shots
53

10 December 2017; 18:00	Hungary	1–4 (0–0, 0–2, 1–2)	Latvia	Méribel Ice Palace; Attendance: 150

Game reference

Károly Tóth
Goalies
Gustavs Grigals
Referee:
(Switzerland) Michael Weber
Linesmen:
(France) Joris Barcelo
(France) Nicolas Constantineau

	0–1	20:58 – Krastenbergs
	0–2	28:10 – Ģēģeris (Svars)
Szalma (Kreisz) – 48:13	1–2
	1–3	50:13 – Bērziņš (Nazarovs, Smons)
	1–4	54:09 – Ģēģeris (Kaļķis, Smirnovs) (PP)

10 min
Penalties
8 min
28
Shots
39

11 December 2017; 13:00	Latvia	2–3 GWS (1–0, 0–2, 1–0) (OT: 0–0) (SO: 0–1)	Kazakhstan	Méribel Ice Palace; Attendance: 600

Game reference

Gustavs Grigals
Goalies
Denis Karatayev
Referee:
(Norway) Roy Stian Hansen
Linesmen:
(France) Nicolas Constantineau
(South Korea) Park Jun-soo

Krastenbergs (Homjakovs, Melnalksnis) – 12:48	1–0
	1–1	27:04 – Ryzhi (Gatiyatov) (PP)
	1–2	36:51 – Gatiyatov (Nazarenko, Mussabayev (SH)
Bērziņš (Ģēģeris, Svars) (EA) – 59:48	2–2

Fjodorovs (miss)
Bļugers (miss)
Krastenbergs (miss)
Ģēģeris (miss)
Homjakovs (miss)
Shootout
(miss) Beketayev
(miss) Melikhov
Gatiyatov
(miss) Mukhametov
(miss) Orekhov
12 min
Penalties
18 min
41
Shots
27

11 December 2017; 19:00	France	4–3 OT (2–2, 0–1, 1–0) (OT: 1–0)	Hungary	Méribel Ice Palace; Attendance: 600

Game reference

Gaëtan Richard
Goalies
Máté Garbacz
Referee:
(Canada) Scott Ferguson
Linesmen:
(Belgium) Frederic Monnaie
(Belarus) Viktor Zinchenko

	0–1	02:39 – Fejes (Vértes)
Olive (Melin, Petit) – 18:12	1–1
Berard (Sarlin, Gleizes) – 18:12	2–1
	2–2	19:27 – Szalma (Fejes)
	2–3	26:19 – Szalma (Horváth, Szita)
Berard (Melin, Sarlin) – 55:43	3–3
Guebey (Texier, Boudon) (PP) – 61:23	4–3

4 min
Penalties
10 min
44
Shots
29

12 December 2017; 19:00	Germany	4–1 (1–1, 2–0, 1–0)	Austria	Méribel Ice Palace; Attendance: 221

Game reference

Mirko Pantkowski
Goalies
Jakob Holzer
Referee:
(Switzerland) Michael Weber
Linesmen:
(Switzerland) David Obwegeser
(Poland) Mariusz Smura

Busch (Glaser, Strodel) – 04:19	1–0
	1–1	15:31 – Baumgartner (Maier)
Walther (Soramies, Postel) – 28:15	2–1
Huß (Bokk, Eder) (PP) – 29:06	3–1
Eder – 51:05	4–1

12 min
Penalties
6 min
33
Shots
26

13 December 2017; 15:30	Hungary	3–5 (1–2, 0–1, 2–2)	Kazakhstan	Courchevel Arena; Attendance: 91

Game reference

Máté Garbacz
Goalies
Denis Karatayev
Referee:
(Norway) Roy Stian Hansen
Linesmen:
(France) Joris Barcelo
(South Korea) Park Jun-soo

Papp (Péter, Szita) (PP) – 07:39	1–0
	1–1	09:54 – Say. Daniyar (Orekhov, Sam. Daniyar) (PP)
	1–2	17:31 – Gatiyatov (Melikhov, Pismarkin)
	1–3	26:41 – Orekhov (Beketayev) (PP)
Molnár (Mihály, Sándor) – 46:13	2–3
Vértes (G. Tóth) – 51:18	3–3
	3–4	55:17 – Beketayev (Muratov, Mukhametov)
	3–5	57:42 – Nazarenko (Beketayev) (ENG)

20 min
Penalties
10 min
26
Shots
25

13 December 2017; 19:00	Germany	4–0 (3–0, 0–0, 1–0)	France	Courchevel Arena; Attendance: 817

Game reference

Mirko Pantkowski
Goalies
Gaëtan Richard
Julian Junca
Referee:
(Slovakia) Miroslav Štefík
Linesmen:
(Switzerland) David Obwegeser
(Belarus) Viktor Zinchenko

Bokk (Gawanke, Huß) (PP) – 04:17	1–0
Seider (Jahnke, Adam) (PP) – 06:46	2–0
Soramies (Postel) – 07:05	3–0
Jahnke (Kiefersauer, Reiter) – 59:16	4–0

10 min
Penalties
10 min
38
Shots
28

13 December 2017; 19:00	Latvia	5–1 (2–0, 0–0, 3–1)	Austria	Méribel Ice Palace; Attendance: 132

Game reference

Gustavs Grigals
Goalies
Jakob Holzer
Referee:
(Canada) Scott Ferguson
Linesmen:
(France) Nicolas Constantineau
(Poland) Mariusz Smura

Ģēģeris (Kārkls, Smirnovs) (PP) – 09:13	1–0
Smirnovs (Svars, Kārkls) (PP) – 09:50	2–0
Bļugers (Svars, Smirnovs) (PP) – 47:18	3–0
Kārkls (Svars, Ģēģeris) (PP) – 49:20	4–0
Krastenbergs (Homjakovs, Smons) – 51:24	5–0
	5–1	57:16 – Feldner (Würschl, Pilgram)

8 min
Penalties
24 min
36
Shots
19

14 December 2017; 19:00	France	0–1 OT (0–0, 0–0, 0–0) (OT: 0–1)	Latvia	Méribel Ice Palace; Attendance: 533

Game reference
Julian Junca	Goalies	Gustavs Grigals	Referee: (Switzerland) Michael Weber; Linesmen: (Belgium) Frederic Monnaie (South Korea) Park Jun-soo
0–1 / 60:06 – Smirnovs			Referee: (Switzerland) Michael Weber; Linesmen: (Belgium) Frederic Monnaie (South Korea) Park Jun-soo
28 min	Penalties	22 min	Referee: (Switzerland) Michael Weber; Linesmen: (Belgium) Frederic Monnaie (South Korea) Park Jun-soo
18	Shots	30	Referee: (Switzerland) Michael Weber; Linesmen: (Belgium) Frederic Monnaie (South Korea) Park Jun-soo

15 December 2017; 13:00	Germany	7–2 (1–0, 2–1, 4–1)	Hungary	Courchevel Arena; Attendance: 482

Game reference

Mirko Pantkowski
Goalies
Károly Tóth
Referee:
(Slovakia) Miroslav Štefík
Linesmen:
(France) Joris Barcelo
(Belgium) Frederic Monnaie

Gawanke (Jahnke, Kiefersauer) – 11:58	1–0
	1–1	22:53 – Majoross (G. Tóth, Szabó)
Busch (Gawanke, Eder) (PP) – 29:15	2–1
Jahnke (Kiefersauer, Hessler) – 36:45	3–1
Eder (Bokk, Huß) – 40:43	4–1
Busch (Eder, Gawanke) (PP) – 43:56	5–1
	5–2	55:54 – Horváth (Szabó, Vértes)
Bindels (Bokk, Eder) – 57:10	6–2
Walther – 59:46	7–2

10 min
Penalties
12 min
32
Shots
33

15 December 2017; 19:00	Kazakhstan	3–2 (3–1, 0–1, 0–0)	Austria	Courchevel Arena; Attendance: 152

Game reference

Denis Karatayev
Nikita Boyarkin
Goalies
Max Zimmermann
Referee:
(Canada) Scott Ferguson
Linesmen:
(Poland) Mariusz Smura
(Belarus) Viktor Zinchenko

	0–1	01:23 – Baumgartner
Pismarkin (Gatiyatov, Nazarenko) – 01:52	1–1
Gusseinov (Polokhov) – 06:28	2–1
Nazarenko (Pismarkin) – 06:51	3–1
	3–2	22:30 – Baumgartner (Klockl, Maier) (PP)

10 min
Penalties
14 min
40
Shots
24

16 December 2017; 14:30	Latvia	1–0 (0–0, 1–0, 0–0)	Germany	Courchevel Arena; Attendance: 187

Game reference
Gustavs Grigals	Goalies	Mirko Pantkowski	Referee: (Slovakia) Miroslav Stefik; Linesmen: (France) Joris Barcelo (Belgium) Frederic Monnaie
Krastenbergs (Komuls) (PP) – 26:06 / 1–0			Referee: (Slovakia) Miroslav Stefik; Linesmen: (France) Joris Barcelo (Belgium) Frederic Monnaie
10 min	Penalties	12 min	Referee: (Slovakia) Miroslav Stefik; Linesmen: (France) Joris Barcelo (Belgium) Frederic Monnaie
26	Shots	33	Referee: (Slovakia) Miroslav Stefik; Linesmen: (France) Joris Barcelo (Belgium) Frederic Monnaie

16 December 2017; 16:00	Austria	5–2 (2–1, 2–1, 1–0)	Hungary	Méribel Ice Palace; Attendance: 250

Game reference

Jakob Holzer
Goalies
Máté Garbacz
Referee:
(Norway) Roy Stian Hansen
Linesmen:
(France) Nicolas Constantineau
(Switzerland) David Obwegeser

Rossi (Feldner) – 07:00	1–0
	1–1	12:16 – Vértes
Feldner (Witting, Rossi) – 13:15	2–1
Baumgartner (Harnisch, Maier) – 27:30	3–1
Rossi (Pilloni, Maier) – 29:36	4–1
	4–2	39:02 – Fejes (Kiss, Horváth) (PP)
Feldner (Rossi, Witting) – 57:21	5–2

8 min
Penalties
10 min
33
Shots
35

16 December 2017; 18:00	France	1–6 (0–1, 1–2, 0–3)	Kazakhstan	Courchevel Arena; Attendance: 1010

Game reference

Julian Junca
Goalies
Nikita Boyarkin
Referee:
(Canada) Scott Ferguson
Linesmen:
(South Korea) Park Jun-soo
(Poland) Mariusz Smura

	0–1	05:49 – Say. Daniyar (Muratov, Orekhov) (PP)
	0–2	27:29 – Melikhov (PS)
	0–3	31:33 – Nazarenko (Gatiyatov, Orekhov) (PP)
Munoz (Boudon) (PP) – 34:58	1–3
	1–4	55:10 – Gusseinov (Melikhov) (PP2)
	1–5	57:56 – Beketayev (Say. Daniyar, Orekhov) (PP2)
	1–6	59:44 – Nazarenko (PP)

96 min
Penalties
51 min
29
Shots
44

=== Statistics ===
==== Top scorers ====
Pos	Player	Country	GP	G	A	Pts	+/–	PIM
1	Artur Gatiyatov	Kazakhstan	5	4	3	7	+5	0
2	Valeri Orekhov	Kazakhstan	5	1	6	7	–3	2
3	Nikita Nazarenko	Kazakhstan	5	4	2	6	+2	4
4	Tobias Eder	Germany	5	2	4	6	+4	4
5	Emīls Ģēģeris	Latvia	5	3	2	5	+3	12
5	Charlie Jahnke	Germany	5	3	2	5	+3	2
5	Marco Rossi	Austria	5	3	2	5	+3	8
8	Adil Beketayev	Kazakhstan	5	2	3	5	+3	2
8	Leon Gawanke	Germany	5	2	3	5	+5	2
8	Deniss Smirnovs	Latvia	5	2	3	5	+3	6

GP = Games played; G = Goals; A = Assists; Pts = Points; +/− = Plus–minus; PIM = Penalties In Minutes
Source:IIHF

==== Goaltending leaders ====
(minimum 40% team's total ice time)

Pos	Player	Country	TOI	GA	Sv%	GAA	SO
1	Gustavs Grigals	Latvia	304:30	5	96.00	0.99	2
2	Mirko Pantkowski	Germany	302:07	7	95.33	1.39	1
3	Julian Junca	France	173:01	8	92.59	2.77	0
4	Denis Karatayev	Kazakhstan	193:46	8	92.58	2.48	0
5	Jakob Holzer	Austria	240:00	17	89.17	4.25	0

TOI = Time on ice (minutes:seconds); GA = Goals against; GAA = Goals against average; Sv% = Save percentage; SO = Shutouts
Source: IIHF

=== Awards ===
==== Best Players Selected by the Directorate ====
- Goaltender: (Germany) Mirko Pantkowski
- Defenceman: (Latvia) Pauls Svars
- Forward: (Kazakhstan) Artur Gatiyatov

== Division I B ==
2018 IIHF U20 World Championship Division I B
Tournament details
- Host country: Slovenia
- City: Bled
- Venue: 1 (in 1 host city)
- Dates: 9–15 December 2017
- Teams: 6

Tournament statistics
- Games played: 15
- Goals scored: 84 (5.6 per game)
- Attendance: 4,040 (269 per game)
- Scoring leader: (Poland) Alan Łyszczarczyk (15 points)

Official website
- www.iihf.com

The Division I B tournament was played in Bled, Slovenia, from 9 to 15 December 2017.

As a result of the tournament, Norway were promoted to Division I A and Lithuania were relegated to Division II A for 2019.

=== Participating teams ===
Team	Qualification
Norway	placed 6th in Division I A last year and were relegated
Poland	placed 2nd in Division I B last year
Slovenia	hosts; placed 3rd in Division I B last year
Italy	placed 4th in Division I B last year
Ukraine	placed 5th in Division I B last year
Lithuania	placed 1st in Division II A last year and were promoted

=== Final standings ===
Pos	Team	Pld	W	OTW	OTL	L	GF	GA	GD	Pts	Promotion or relegation
1	Norway	5	3	2	0	0	18	5	+13	13	Promoted to the 2019 Division I A
2	Poland	5	3	1	1	0	23	14	+9	12	
3	Slovenia (H)	5	3	0	1	1	18	15	+3	10	
4	Ukraine	5	1	1	1	2	9	11	−2	6	
5	Italy	5	0	1	0	4	9	23	−14	2 (Note: Italy defeated Lithuania 2–1)	
6	Lithuania	5	0	0	2	3	7	16	−9	2	Relegated to the 2019 Division II A

Source: IIHF
Rules for classification: 1) points; 2) head-to-head points; 3) head-to-head goal difference; 4) head-to-head number of goals scored; 5) result against closest best-ranked team outside tied teams; 6) result against second-best ranked team outside tied teams; 7) seeding before tournament.
(H) Host

=== Match results ===
All times are local (UTC+1).

9 December 2017; 13:00	Italy	4–9 (1–1, 2–6, 1–2)	Poland	Ice Hall Bled; Attendance: 152

Game reference

Robin Quagliato
Goalies
Kamil Lewartowski
Referee:
(Austria) Christoph Sternat
Linesmen:
(Slovakia) Lukáš Kacej
(Slovenia) Gregor Režek

Leitner (Gasser, Fink) (PP) – 11:05	1–0
	1–1	15:45 – Łyszczarczyk (Jeziorski)
	1–2	22:41 – Jeziorski (Łyszczarczyk)
	1–3	27:00 – Bernacki (Zygmunt, Mi. Rybak)
	1–4	27:47 – Jeziorski (Łyszczarczyk, Paś)
Kasslatter (Reffo) – 28:29	2–4
Gasser (Spinell, Gios) (PP) – 31:13	3–4
	3–5	31:54 – Paś (Łyszczarczyk) (SH)
	3–6	33:29 – Łyszczarczyk (Michałowski)
	3–7	36:45 – Sołtys (Pelaczyk, Jarosz)
	3–8	49:54 – Radzieńciak (Paś, Skokan) (PP2)
Fink (Gasser, Leitner) (PP) – 52:38	4–8
	4–9	54:18 – Bernacki (Zygmunt, Łyszczarczyk) (PP)

24 min
Penalties
16 min
34
Shots
44

9 December 2017; 16:30	Ukraine	1–3 (0–0, 1–2, 0–1)	Slovenia	Ice Hall Bled; Attendance: 523

Game reference

Bogdan Dyachenko
Goalies
Žiga Kogovšek
Referee:
(Germany) Andre Schrader
Linesmen:
(Germany) Jonas Merten
(Austria) Maximilian Verworner

	0–1	21:12 – Drozg (Urukalo, Šturm)
	0–2	26:55 – Drozg (Jugovic, Šturm) (PP)
Sherbakov (Peresunko) (PP) – 37:19	1–2
	1–3	40:27 – Sodja (Kapel)

6 min
Penalties
8 min
26
Shots
39

9 December 2017; 20:00	Lithuania	1–4 (0–1, 0–2, 1–1)	Norway	Ice Hall Bled; Attendance: 157

Game reference

Elvinas Karla
Laurynas Lubys
Goalies
Jørgen Hanneborg
Referee:
(Hungary) Gergely Kincses
Linesmen:
(Sweden) Daniel Persson
(Kazakhstan) Vladimir Suslov

	0–1	12:02 – Karlsen (Nielsen)
	0–2	24:31 – Noer (Meisingset)
	0–3	29:40 – Vikingstad (Nielsen)
Kaleinikovas (Misiuk) (SH) – 52:13	1–3
	1–4	57:09 – Edvardsen (ENG)

37 min
Penalties
6 min
19
Shots
40

10 December 2017; 13:00	Norway	4–0 (2–0, 1–0, 1–0)	Italy	Ice Hall Bled; Attendance: 106

Game reference

Jonas Wikstøl
Goalies
Hannes Stoll
Referee:
(United States) Sean MacFarlane
Linesmen:
(Slovenia) Anže Bergant
(Austria) Maximilian Verworner

Noer (Kjellesvik) – 04:32	1–0
Ellingsen (Noer, Karlsen) – 15:05	2–0
Grøsvik (Solem) – 39:35	3–0
Ellingsen (Karlsen, Noer) – 40:59	4–0

4 min
Penalties
4 min
44
Shots
21

10 December 2017; 16:30	Slovenia	4–3 (1–0, 3–1, 0–2)	Lithuania	Ice Hall Bled; Attendance: 497

Game reference

Žiga Kogovšek
Goalies
Elvinas Karla
Laurynas Lubys
Referee:
(Austria) Christoph Sternat
Linesmen:
(Slovakia) Lukáš Kacej
(Germany) Jonas Merten

Sodja (Brun Rauh, Svetina) (PP) – 16:36	1–0
	1–1	24:07 – Kaleinikovas
Drozg (Kujavec, Brus) – 29:48	2–1
Šturm (Drozg, Sever) (PP) – 33:03	3–1
Svetina (Brun Rauh, Kapel) (PP) – 38:18	4–1
	4–2	46:15 – Washco (Bogdziul, Mukovoz) (PP)
	4–3	58:42 – Ragas (Bogdziul, Žukauskas) (EA)

2 min
Penalties
6 min
38
Shots
10

10 December 2017; 20:00	Poland	3–2 (0–1, 3–1, 0–0)	Ukraine	Ice Hall Bled; Attendance: 102

Game reference

Kamil Lewartowski
Goalies
Bogdan Dyachenko
Referee:
(Hungary) Gergely Kincses
Linesmen:
(Slovenia) Gregor Režek
(Kazakhstan) Vladimir Suslov

	0–1	01:13 – Sherbakov (Ordynsky, Horlushko) (PP)
Łyszczarczyk (Paś, Jeziorski) – 20:48	1–1
Sołtys (Jarosz, Michałowski) – 29:06	2–1
Jeziorski (Radzieńciak) – 31:28	3–1
	3–2	36:17 – Mazur (Horlushko) (PP)

8 min
Penalties
8 min
40
Shots
22

12 December 2017; 13:00	Norway	2–1 GWS (0–0, 0–0, 1–1) (OT: 0–0) (SO: 3–1)	Ukraine	Ice Hall Bled; Attendance: 113

Game reference
Jørgen Hanneborg	Goalies	Bogdan Dyachenko	Referee: (Austria) Christoph Sternat; Linesmen: (Slovenia) Anže Bergant (Slovakia) Lukáš Kacej
/ 0–1 / 44:12 – Kovalenko (Deniskin, Mostovy) (PP); Karlsen (Kjellesvik, Noer) (PP) – 52:18 / 1–1			Referee: (Austria) Christoph Sternat; Linesmen: (Slovenia) Anže Bergant (Slovakia) Lukáš Kacej
Grøsvik; Hermansen (miss); Noer; Ellingsen (miss); Karlsen	Shootout	(miss) Mostovy; (miss) Peresunko; Deniskin; (miss) Mazur	Referee: (Austria) Christoph Sternat; Linesmen: (Slovenia) Anže Bergant (Slovakia) Lukáš Kacej
6 min	Penalties	6 min	Referee: (Austria) Christoph Sternat; Linesmen: (Slovenia) Anže Bergant (Slovakia) Lukáš Kacej
44	Shots	26	Referee: (Austria) Christoph Sternat; Linesmen: (Slovenia) Anže Bergant (Slovakia) Lukáš Kacej

12 December 2017; 16:30	Poland	5–4 GWS (0–1, 4–2, 0–1) (OT: 0–0) (SO: 2–0)	Slovenia	Ice Hall Bled; Attendance: 652

Game reference

Kamil Lewartowski
Goalies
Žiga Kogovšek
Referee:
(United States) Sean MacFarlane
Linesmen:
(Sweden) Daniel Persson
(Austria) Maximillian Verworner

	0–1	12:36 – Sever (Šturm, Drozg) (PP)
Łyszczarczyk (Jeziorski, Bizacki) (PP) – 25:49	1–1
	1–2	26:47 – Svetina (Kapel, Sodja)
Łyszczarczyk (Jeziorski, Bizacki) – 27:51	2–2
Paś (Jeziorski, Łyszczarczyk) – 34:20	3–2
	3–3	37:39 – Kapel (Sodja, Svetina)
Jeziorski (Paś, Łyszczarczyk) – 39:59	4–3
	4–4	40:56 – Šturm (Klofutar, Drozg)

Jeziorski
Łyszczarczyk
Paś (miss)
Sołtys (miss)
Shootout
(miss) Drozg
(miss) Tislar
(miss) Svetina
(miss) Sodja
10 min
Penalties
10 min
36
Shots
34

12 December 2017; 20:00	Lithuania	1–2 OT (0–0, 1–0, 0–1) (OT: 0–1)	Italy	Ice Hall Bled; Attendance: 108

Game reference

Laurynas Lubys
Goalies
Robin Quagliato
Referee:
(Germany) Andre Schrader
Linesmen:
(Germany) Jonas Merten
(Slovenia) Gregor Rezek

Kaleinikovas (Gusevas) – 22:55	1–0
	1–1	51:23 – Kosmac (Galassiti, Berger) (PP)
	1–2	62:54 – Berger (Gios, Kosmac) (PP)

10 min
Penalties
8 min
27
Shots
35

13 December 2017; 13:00	Poland	4–1 (1–0, 2–1, 1–0)	Lithuania	Ice Hall Bled; Attendance: 100

Game reference

Kamil Lewartowski
Goalies
Elvinas Karla
Laurynas Lubys
Referee:
(Hungary) Gergely Kincses
Linesmen:
(Germany) Jonas Merten
(Kazakhstan) Vladimir Suslov

Bernacki (Wysocki, Jeziorski) – 11:45	1–0
Bernacki (Zygmunt, Michałowski) (SH) – 22:43	2–0
	2–1	24:52 – Kaleinikovas (Mukovoz)
Łyszczarczyk (Bizacki) (PP) – 31:01	3–1
Łyszczarczyk (Paś, Skokan) (ENG) – 57:31	4–1

8 min
Penalties
4 min
24
Shots
16

13 December 2017; 16:30	Slovenia	1–5 (0–1, 1–2, 0–2)	Norway	Ice Hall Bled; Attendance: 747

Game reference

Žiga Kogovšek
Uroš Plavc
Goalies
Jonas Wikstøl
Referee:
(Germany) Andre Schrader
Linesmen:
(Slovakia) Lukáš Kacej
(Sweden) Daniel Persson

	0–1	07:56 – Homdrom (Dahl, Edvardsen)
	0–2	20:30 – Kjellesvik (Noer, Ellingsen)
Kujavec (Svetina) – 36:10	1–2
	1–3	36:42 – Ellingsen (Noer, Karlsen)
	1–4	44:54 – Noer (Harbosen)
	1–5	55:49 – Meisingset (Hermansen, Mathisen) (PP2)

14 min
Penalties
12 min
14
Shots
33

13 December 2017; 20:00	Italy	2–3 (0–2, 1–1, 1–0)	Ukraine	Ice Hall Bled; Attendance: 102

Game reference

Robin Quagliato
Goalies
Bogdan Dyachenko
Referee:
(United States) Sean MacFarlane
Linesmen:
(Slovenia) Anže Bergant
(Austria) Maximilian Verworner

	0–1	02:15 – Peresunko (Mostovy)
	0–2	19:17 – Kozachuk (Grigoryev, Sherbakov) (EA)
Berger (Galassiti, Kosmac) – 25:08	1–2
	1–3	37:33 – Danylenko (Grigoryev, Krivoshapkin)
Fink (Deluca, Pechlaner) – 44:46	2–3

6 min
Penalties
8 min
28
Shots
25

15 December 2017; 13:00	Ukraine	2–1 GWS (0–0, 1–1, 0–0) (OT: 0–0) (SO: 2–0)	Lithuania	Ice Hall Bled; Attendance: 116

Game reference
Bogdan Dyachenko	Goalies	Laurynas Lubys	Referee: (Germany) Andre Schrader; Linesmen: (Slovenia) Anže Bergant (Sweden) Daniel Persson
Mostovy (Deniskin, Kovalenko) (PP) – 28:19 / 1–0; / 1–1 / 35:30 – Bučys (Gusevas, Kudrevičius) (PP)			Referee: (Germany) Andre Schrader; Linesmen: (Slovenia) Anže Bergant (Sweden) Daniel Persson
Stupak; Peresunko; Ordynsky (miss); Deniskin (miss)	Shootout	(miss) Kaleinikovas; (miss) Bučys; (miss) Krukovski; (miss) Bogdziul	Referee: (Germany) Andre Schrader; Linesmen: (Slovenia) Anže Bergant (Sweden) Daniel Persson
10 min	Penalties	16 min	Referee: (Germany) Andre Schrader; Linesmen: (Slovenia) Anže Bergant (Sweden) Daniel Persson
30	Shots	24	Referee: (Germany) Andre Schrader; Linesmen: (Slovenia) Anže Bergant (Sweden) Daniel Persson

15 December 2017; 16:30	Slovenia	6–1 (2–0, 1–0, 3–1)	Italy	Ice Hall Bled; Attendance: 412

Game reference

Žiga Kogovšek
Goalies
Hannes Stoll
Referee:
(Austria) Christoph Sternat
Linesmen:
(Kazakhstan) Vladimir Suslov
(Austria) Maximilian Verworner

Tislar (Tavčar, Brglez) – 16:09	1–0
Ban (Drozg, Šturm) (PP) – 18:14	2–0
Svetina (Sodja, Kapel) – 38:17	3–0
	3–1	44:57 – Kasslatter (Gasser, Deluca)
Drozg (Šturm, Brun Rauh) – 46:08	4–1
Drozg (Brus, Kujavec) – 57:23	5–1
Kapel (Kujavec, Svetina) – 59:53	6–1

18 min
Penalties
8 min
33
Shots
32

15 December 2017; 20:00	Norway	3–2 GWS (0–0, 2–1, 0–1) (OT: 0–0) (SO: 2–0)	Poland	Ice Hall Bled; Attendance: 153

Game reference

Jørgen Hanneborg
Goalies
Kamil Lewartowski
Referee:
(United States) Sean Macfarlane
Linesmen:
(Slovakia) Lukas Kacej
(Slovenia) Gregor Rezek

Vold (Solem, Harbosen) – 25:33	1–0
Karlsen (Noer, Nielsen) – 26:37	2–0
	2–1	36:59 – Jarosz (Jeziorski, Łyszczarczyk)
	2–2	59:53 – Łyszczarczyk (Jeziorski, Zygmunt) (PP, EA)

Grøsvik (miss)
Ellingsen
Marthinsen (miss)
Noer
Shootout
(miss) Jeziorski
(miss) Łyszczarczyk
(miss) Paś
(miss) Radzieńciak
6 min
Penalties
10 min
31
Shots
27

=== Statistics ===
==== Top 10 scorers ====
Pos	Player	Country	GP	G	A	Pts	+/–	PIM
1	Alan Łyszczarczyk	Poland	5	8	7	15	+8	6
2	Bartłomiej Jeziorski	Poland	5	5	7	12	+7	2
3	Jacob Noer	Norway	5	4	6	10	+8	0
4	Jan Drozg	Slovenia	5	5	4	9	+3	10
5	Erik Svetina	Slovenia	5	3	4	7	+4	0
6	Dominik Paś	Poland	5	2	5	7	+6	4
6	Jaka Sturm	Slovenia	5	2	5	7	0	0
8	Christoffer Karlsen	Norway	5	3	3	6	+8	2
9	Rok Kapel	Slovenia	5	2	4	6	+2	0
10	Martin Ellingsen	Norway	5	4	1	5	+7	6

GP = Games played; G = Goals; A = Assists; Pts = Points; +/− = Plus–minus; PIM = Penalties In Minutes
Source: IIHF.com

==== Goaltending leaders ====
(minimum 40% team's total ice time)

Pos	Player	Country	TOI	GA	Sv%	GAA	SO
1	Laurynas Lubys	Lithuania	185:27	4	95.29	1.29	0
2	Jørgen Hanneborg	Norway	190:00	4	94.44	1.26	0
3	Bogdan Dyachenko	Ukraine	309:35	11	93.71	2.13	0
4	Kamil Lewartowski	Poland	308:27	14	89.55	2.72	0
5	Žiga Kogovšek	Slovenia	303:30	15	89.05	2.97	0

TOI = Time on ice (minutes:seconds); GA = Goals against; GAA = Goals against average; Sv% = Save percentage; SO = Shutouts
Source: IIHF.com

=== Awards ===
==== Best Players Selected by the Directorate ====
- Goaltender: (Ukraine) Bogdan Dyachenko
- Defenceman: (Slovenia) Nejc Stojan
- Forward: (Poland) Alan Łyszczarczyk
