= Emīls =

Male given name

- Gender: Male
- Name day: 21 June

Origin
- Region of origin: Latvia

Other names
- Related names: Emil

Emīls is a Latvian masculine given name and may refer to:

- Emīls Dārziņš (1875–1910), Latvian composer, conductor and music critic
- Emīls Ģēģeris (born 1999), Latvian ice hockey player
- Emīls Liepiņš (born 1992), Latvian cyclist
- Emīls Urbāns (fl. 1920s), Latvian footballer
