= 2026–27 IIHF European Cup of Nations =

Tournament details
- Host countries: Germany; France; Poland; Estonia
- Venues: 4 (in 4 host cities)
- Dates: 5–8 November 2026
- Teams: 16

The 2026–27 IIHF European Cup of Nations is the second edition of the IIHF European Cup of Nations organised by the International Ice Hockey Federation (IIHF).

The teams will be split into groups and play in the three international breaks in various venues.

== Group A tournament ==
Group A
Tournament details
- Host country: Germany
- City: Düsseldorf
- Venue: 1 (in 1 host city)
- Dates: 5–8 November
- Teams: 4

Tournament statistics
- Games played: 6
- Goals scored: 34 (5.67 per game)

Official website
- Website

=== Standings ===
Pos	Team	Pld	W	OTW	OTL	L	GF	GA	GD	Pts
1	Latvia	3	2	1	0	0	12	5	+7	8
2	Germany (H)	3	2	0	0	1	8	6	+2	6
3	Slovakia	3	1	0	1	1	11	8	+3	4
4	Austria	3	0	0	0	3	3	15	−12	0

Source: IIHF
Rules for classification: 1) points; 2) head-to-head points; 3) head-to-head goal difference; 4) head-to-head number of goals scored.
(H) Host

=== Results ===
All times are local (UTC+1).

5 November 2026; 16:15	Latvia	3–2 OT (1–0, 0–1, 1–1) (OT: 1–0)	Slovakia	PSD Bank Dome, Düsseldorf

5 November 2026; 19:45	Germany	3–0 (0–0 2–0 1–0)	Austria	PSD Bank Dome, Düsseldorf

7 November 2026; 15:00	Slovakia	6–1 (0–0, 4–1, 2–0)	Austria	PSD Bank Dome, Düsseldorf

7 November 2026; 18:30	Germany	1–3 (0–0, 1–2, 0–1)	Latvia	PSD Bank Dome, Düsseldorf

8 November 2026; 11:00	Latvia	6–2 (3–0, 2–2, 1–0)	Austria	PSD Bank Dome, Düsseldorf

8 November 2026; 14:45	Germany	4–3 (0–1, 0–2, 4–0)	Slovakia	PSD Bank Dome, Düsseldorf

== Group B ==
Group B
Tournament details
- Host country: France
- City: Amiens
- Venue: 1 (in 1 host city)
- Dates: 5–7 November
- Teams: 4

Tournament statistics
- Games played: 6
- Goals scored: 27 (4.5 per game)

Official website
- Website

=== Standings ===
Pos	Team	Pld	W	OTW	OTL	L	GF	GA	GD	Pts
1	Norway	3	2	0	1	0	5	4	+1	7
2	France (H)	3	2	0	0	1	9	5	+4	6
3	Slovenia	3	1	1	0	1	10	8	+2	5
4	Hungary	3	0	0	0	3	3	10	−7	0

Source: IIHF
Rules for classification: 1) points; 2) head-to-head points; 3) head-to-head goal difference; 4) head-to-head number of goals scored.
(H) Host

=== Results ===
All times are local (UTC+1).

5 November 2026; 16:00	Hungary	2–5 (2–1, 0–1, 0–3)	Slovenia	Coliséum, Amiens

5 November 2026; 20:00	France	1–2 (1–1, 0–0, 0–1)	Norway	Coliséum, Amiens

6 November 2026; 16:00	Norway	2–1 (1–1, 0–0, 1–0)	Hungary	Coliséum, Amiens

6 November 2026; 20:00	Slovenia	3–5 (0–1, 2–1, 1–3)	France	Coliséum, Amiens

7 November 2026; 15:00	Norway	1–2 GWS (0–0, 1–0, 0–1) (OT: 0–0) (SO: 0–1)	Slovenia	Coliséum, Amiens

7 November 2026; 19:00	France	3–0 (1–0, 0–0, 2–0)	Hungary	Coliséum, Amiens

== Group C ==
Group C
Tournament details
- Host country: Poland
- City: Sosnowiec
- Venue: 1 (in 1 host city)
- Dates: 5–7 November
- Teams: 4

Tournament statistics
- Games played: 6
- Goals scored: 27 (4.5 per game)

Official website
- Website

=== Standings ===
Pos	Team	Pld	W	OTW	OTL	L	GF	GA	GD	Pts
1	Ukraine	3	3	0	0	0	10	4	+6	9
2	Poland (H)	3	1	1	0	1	8	5	+3	5
3	Italy	3	1	0	1	1	7	6	+1	4
4	Great Britain	3	0	0	0	3	2	12	−10	0

Source: IIHF
Rules for classification: 1) points; 2) head-to-head points; 3) head-to-head goal difference; 4) head-to-head number of goals scored.
(H) Host

=== Results ===
All times are local (UTC+1).

5 November 2026; 16:00	Great Britain	0–3 (0–1, 0–0, 0–2)	Italy	ArcelorMittal Park, Sosnowiec

5 November 2026; 19:45	Poland	1–2 (1–0, 0–1, 0–1)	Ukraine	ArcelorMittal Park, Sosnowiec

6 November 2026; 16:00	Ukraine	5–1 (2–0, 1–1, 2–0)	Great Britain	ArcelorMittal Park, Sosnowiec

6 November 2026; 19:45	Poland	3–2 OT (0–0, 2–2, 0–0) (OT: 1–0)	Italy	ArcelorMittal Park, Sosnowiec

7 November 2026; 14:45	Poland	4–1 (2–0, 1–1, 1–0)	Great Britain	ArcelorMittal Park, Sosnowiec

7 November 2026; 18:15	Italy	2–3 (0–1, 2–0, 0–2)	Ukraine	ArcelorMittal Park, Sosnowiec

== Group D ==
Group D
Tournament details
- Host country: Estonia
- City: Tallinn
- Venue: 1 (in 1 host city)
- Dates: 5–7 November
- Teams: 4

Tournament statistics
- Games played: 6
- Goals scored: 38 (6.33 per game)

Official website
- Website

=== Standings ===
Pos	Team	Pld	W	OTW	OTL	L	GF	GA	GD	Pts
1	Estonia (H)	3	3	0	0	0	17	4	+13	9
2	Romania	3	1	1	0	1	11	11	0	5
3	Lithuania	3	0	1	0	2	6	9	−3	2 (Note: Spain 0–1 Lithuania)
4	Spain	3	0	0	2	1	5	15	−10	2

Source: IIHF
Rules for classification: 1) points; 2) head-to-head points; 3) head-to-head goal difference; 4) head-to-head number of goals scored.
(H) Host

=== Results ===
All times are local (UTC+2).

5 November 2026; 15:00	Lithuania	2–4 (0–1, 1–1, 1–2)	Romania	Tondiraba Ice Hall, Tallinn

5 November 2026; 18:30	Estonia	8–0 (4–0, 2–0, 2–0)	Spain	Tondiraba Ice Hall, Tallinn

6 November 2026; 15:00	Spain	0–1 OT (0–0, 0–0, 0–0) (OT: 0–1)	Lithuania	Tondiraba Ice Hall, Tallinn

6 November 2026; 18:30	Romania	1–4 (0–0, 1–1, 0–3)	Estonia	Tondiraba Ice Hall, Tallinn

7 November 2026; 15:00	Romania	6–5 GWS (2–3, 3–2, 0–0) (OT: 0–0) (SO: 1–0)	Spain	Tondiraba Ice Hall, Tallinn

7 November 2026; 18:30	Estonia	5–3 (2–1, 1–1, 2–1)	Lithuania	Tondiraba Ice Hall, Tallinn
