= 2026–27 IIHF Women's European Cup of Nations =

2026–27 IIHF European Cup of Nations
Tournament details
- Host countries: Germany; Slovakia; Poland
- Venues: 2 (in 2 host cities)
- Dates: 20–22 August 2026; 15–17 October 2026
- Teams: 8

The 2026–27 IIHF European Cup of Nations is the second edition of the IIHF European Cup of Nations organised by the International Ice Hockey Federation (IIHF) and the first with a women's tournament.

The teams are split into groups and play in the international breaks in various venues.

== Group A ==
Group A
Tournament details
- Host country: Germany
- City: Füssen
- Venue: 1 (in 1 host city)
- Dates: 20–22 August
- Teams: 4

Tournament statistics
- Games played: 6
- Goals scored: 29 (4.83 per game)

Official website
- Website

=== Standings ===
Pos	Team	Pld	W	OTW	OTL	L	GF	GA	GD	Pts
1	Germany (H)	3	3	0	0	0	8	4	+4	9
2	France	3	2	0	0	1	9	5	+4	6
3	Hungary	3	1	0	0	2	9	3	+6	3
4	Norway	3	0	0	0	3	3	17	−14	0

Source: IIHF
Rules for classification: 1) points; 2) head-to-head points; 3) head-to-head goal difference; 4) head-to-head number of goals scored.
(H) Host

=== Results ===
All times are local (UTC+2).

20 August 2026; 16:00	Norway	0–8 (0–1, 0–1, 0–6)	Hungary	Bundesstützpunkt, Füssen

20 August 2026; 19:30	Germany	3–2 (1–1, 2–0, 0–1)	France	Bundesstützpunkt, Füssen

20 August 2026; 14:30	Hungary	1–2 (0–0, 1–1, 0–1)	France	Bundesstützpunkt, Füssen

20 August 2026; 18:00	Germany	4–2 (1–1, 1–1, 2–0)	Norway	Bundesstützpunkt, Füssen

20 August 2026; 11:00	France	5–1 (2–0, 2–1, 1–0)	Norway	Bundesstützpunkt, Füssen

20 August 2026; 14:30	Germany	1–0 (0–0, 0–0, 1–0)	Hungary	Bundesstützpunkt, Füssen

== Group B ==
Group B
Tournament details
- Host country: Slovakia
- City: Bardejov
- Venue: 1 (in 1 host city)
- Dates: 20–22 August
- Teams: 4

Tournament statistics
- Games played: 6
- Goals scored: 31 (5.17 per game)

Official website
- Website

=== Standings ===
Pos	Team	Pld	W	OTW	OTL	L	GF	GA	GD	Pts
1	Slovakia (H)	3	3	0	0	0	18	3	+15	9
2	Austria	3	2	0	0	1	7	6	+1	6
3	Italy	3	1	0	0	2	5	9	−4	3
4	Netherlands	3	0	0	0	3	1	13	−12	0

Source: IIHF
Rules for classification: 1) points; 2) head-to-head points; 3) head-to-head goal difference; 4) head-to-head number of goals scored.
(H) Host

=== Results ===
All times are local (UTC+2).

20 August 2026; 13:00	Italy	3–1 (1–1, 1–0, 1–0)	Netherlands	Zimný štadión BŠK, Bardejov

20 August 2026; 17:00	Austria	2–5 (0–1, 2–2, 0–2)	Slovakia	Zimný štadión BŠK, Bardejov

20 August 2026; 13:00	Netherlands	0–2 (0–1, 0–0, 0–1)	Austria	Zimný štadión BŠK, Bardejov

20 August 2026; 17:00	Slovakia	5–1 (2–0, 3–1, 0–0)	Italy	Zimný štadión BŠK, Bardejov

20 August 2026; 10:30	Austria	3–1 (1–0, 1–1, 1–0)	Italy	Zimný štadión BŠK, Bardejov

20 August 2026; 14:30	Slovakia	8–0 (4–0, 2–0, 2–0)	Netherlands	Zimný štadión BŠK, Bardejov

== Group C ==
Group C
Tournament details
- Host country: Poland
- City: Sosnowiec
- Venue: 1 (in 1 host city)
- Dates: 15–17 October
- Teams: 4

Tournament statistics
- Games played: 6
- Goals scored: 28 (4.67 per game)

Official website
- Website

=== Standings ===
Pos	Team	Pld	W	OTW	OTL	L	GF	GA	GD	Pts
1	Poland (H)	3	3	0	0	0	11	2	+9	9
2	Great Britain	3	2	0	0	1	11	5	+6	6
3	Spain	3	1	0	0	2	4	7	−3	3
4	Slovenia	3	0	0	0	3	2	14	−12	0

Source: IIHF
Rules for classification: 1) points; 2) head-to-head points; 3) head-to-head goal difference; 4) head-to-head number of goals scored.
(H) Host

=== Results ===
All times are local (UTC+2).

15 October 2026; 15:00	Poland	5–2 (1–1, 3–0, 1–1)	Great Britain	Winter Stadium, Sosnowiec

15 October 2026; 18:30	Spain	4–2 (2–0, 1–1, 1–1)	Slovenia	Winter Stadium, Sosnowiec

16 October 2026; 15:00	Great Britain	3–0 (0–0, 1–0, 2–0)	Spain	Winter Stadium, Sosnowiec

16 October 2026; 18:30	Poland	4–0 (0–0, 3–0, 1–0)	Slovenia	Winter Stadium, Sosnowiec

17 October 2026; 12:00	Slovenia	0–6 (0–5, 0–0, 0–1)	Great Britain	Winter Stadium, Sosnowiec

17 October 2026; 15:30	Poland	2–0 (1–0, 1–0, 0–0)	Spain	Winter Stadium, Sosnowiec

== Group D ==
Group D
Tournament details
- Host country: Romania
- City: Bucharest
- Venue: 1 (in 1 host city)
- Dates: 5–7 November
- Teams: 4

Tournament statistics
- Games played: 6
- Goals scored: 27 (4.5 per game)

Official website
- Website

=== Standings ===
Pos	Team	Pld	W	OTW	OTL	L	GF	GA	GD	Pts
1	Romania (H)	3	2	1	0	0	10	3	+7	8
2	Turkey	3	1	1	0	1	7	9	−2	5
3	Lithuania	3	0	0	3	0	4	7	−3	3
4	Ukraine	3	0	1	0	2	5	7	−2	2

Source: IIHF
Rules for classification: 1) points; 2) head-to-head points; 3) head-to-head goal difference; 4) head-to-head number of goals scored.
(H) Host

=== Results ===
All times are local (UTC+2).

5 November 2026; 12:00	Ukraine	2–1 OT (1–0, 0–1, 0–0) (OT: 1–0)	Lithuania	Allianz-Țiriac Arena Ice Rink, Bucharest

5 November 2026; 15:00	Romania	5–1 (1–0, 2–0, 2–1)	Turkey	Allianz-Țiriac Arena Ice Rink, Bucharest

6 November 2026; 12:00	Turkey	3–2 (1–1, 0–1, 2–0)	Ukraine	Allianz-Țiriac Arena Ice Rink, Bucharest

6 November 2026; 15:00	Lithuania	1–2 OT (1–1, 0–0, 0–0) (OT: 0–1)	Romania	Allianz-Țiriac Arena Ice Rink, Bucharest

7 November 2026; 12:00	Turkey	3–2 OT (0–1, 0–0, 2–1) (OT: 1–0)	Lithuania	Allianz-Țiriac Arena Ice Rink, Bucharest

7 November 2026; 15:00	Romania	3–1 (2–0, 0–1, 1–0)	Ukraine	Allianz-Țiriac Arena Ice Rink, Bucharest
