= IIHF European Cup of Nations =

International ice hockey tournament for men's national teams from Europe

- Current season, competition or edition: 2026–27 IIHF European Cup of Nations; 2026–27 IIHF Women's European Cup of Nations
- Sport: Ice hockey
- Founded: 2025
- Founder: International Ice Hockey Federation
- First season: 2025
- No. of teams: 18
- Continent: Europe

The IIHF European Cup of Nations features several European teams, divided in groups and playing in the international breaks.

== History ==
The European Cup of Nations was created to feature more international games during the three international breaks per year. Teams will compete in groups and will play their games in different venues. In the 2026–27 edition, a women's tournament was added.

=== Men ===
- 2025–26 IIHF European Cup of Nations
- 2026–27 IIHF European Cup of Nations

=== Women ===
- 2026–27 IIHF Women's European Cup of Nations

== See also ==
- Euro Hockey Tour
- Deutschland Cup
- Karjala Tournament
- Euro Ice Hockey Challenge
- Euro Hockey Challenge
- Ice Hockey European Championships
- IIHF European Women Championships
