= Renārs Krastenbergs =

Latvian ice hockey player (born 1998)

- Born: 26 December 1998 (age 27) Jelgava, Latvia
- Height: 6 ft 0 in (183 cm)
- Weight: 185 lb (84 kg; 13 st 3 lb)
- Position: Forward
- Shoots: Left
- ELH team Former teams: HC Olomouc; Dinamo Riga; HK Mogo; EC VSV; Södertälje SK; AIK; HC La Chaux-de-Fonds; Graz99ers; HK Dukla Michalovce
- National team: Latvia
- NHL draft: Undrafted
- Playing career: 2020–present

Renārs Krastenbergs (born 26 December 1998) is a Latvian professional ice hockey player who is a forward for HC Olomouc of the Czech Extraliga (ELH).

== International play ==
Medal record

Representing Latvia

Ice hockey

World Championships
Bronze medal – third place	2023 Finland/Latvia	

Krastenbergs represented Latvia at the 2021 IIHF World Championship. He represented Latvia at the 2023 IIHF World Championship where he won a bronze medal, Latvia's first ever IIHF World Championship medal.

== Career statistics ==
=== Regular season and playoffs ===
			Regular season					Playoffs
Season	Team	League	GP	G	A	Pts	PIM	GP	G	A	Pts	PIM
2013–14	SK Rīga 17	LAT U18	21	7	7	14	10	—	—	—	—	—
2014–15	SK Rīga 17	RUS U17	33	19	16	35	48	—	—	—	—	—
2014–15	SK Rīga 17	LAT.2	26	17	14	31	18	5	2	5	7	4
2015–16	TPH Thunder 18U AAA	T1EHL	30	9	9	18	18	4	0	2	2	0
2016–17	Oshawa Generals	OHL	63	9	15	24	28	11	6	3	9	4
2017–18	Oshawa Generals	OHL	61	21	17	38	32	3	1	0	1	4
2018–19	Wheeling Nailers	ECHL	62	19	25	44	43	—	—	—	—	—
2019–20	Wheeling Nailers	ECHL	52	13	17	30	39	—	—	—	—	—
2020–21	Dinamo Rīga	KHL	6	0	0	0	4	—	—	—	—	—
2020–21	HK Mogo/LSPA	LAT	8	6	6	12	0	—	—	—	—	—
2020–21	EC VSV	ICEHL	12	4	5	9	10	1	0	0	0	0
2021–22	EC VSV	ICEHL	32	15	13	28	37	11	4	8	12	4
2022–23	Södertälje SK	Allsv	27	2	8	10	14	—	—	—	—	—
2022–23	AIK	Allsv	18	5	7	12	12	—	—	—	—	—
2023–24	HC La Chaux-de-Fonds	SL	11	6	6	12	8	—	—	—	—	—
2023–24	Graz99ers	ICEHL	30	13	9	22	8	—	—	—	—	—
2024–25	HK Dukla Michalovce	Slovak	53	31	19	50	34	3	0	1	1	4
KHL totals			6	0	0	0	4	—	—	—	—	—
ICEHL totals			74	32	27	59	55	12	4	8	12	4

=== International ===
Year	Team	Event	Result	GP	G	A	Pts	PIM
2016	Latvia	WJC U18	9th	7	2	6	8	12
2017	Latvia	WJC	10th	6	3	1	4	2
2018	Latvia	WJC D1A	DNQ	5	4	0	4	2
2021	Latvia	WC	11th	6	2	1	3	2
2021	Latvia	OGQ	Q	3	0	0	0	0
2022	Latvia	OG	11th	4	1	4	5	2
2022	Latvia	WC	10th	6	0	0	0	2
2023	Latvia	WC	3rd place, bronze medalist(s)	7	0	0	0	0
2024	Latvia	WC	9th	7	1	0	1	4
2024	Latvia	OGQ	Q	3	0	0	0	0
2026	Latvia	OG	10th	4	2	1	3	2
2026	Latvia	WC	6th	6	2	1	3	6
Junior totals				18	9	7	16	16
Senior totals				46	8	7	15	18
