= Daniels Bērziņš =

Latvian ice hockey player

- Born: February 6, 1999 (age 27) Rīga, Latvia
- Height: 184 cm (6 ft 0 in)
- Weight: 80 kg (176 lb; 12 st 8 lb)
- Position: Center
- Shoots: Left
- KHL team: Dinamo Riga
- Playing career: 2017–present

Daniels Bērziņš (born 6 February 1999) is a Latvian professional ice hockey forward who is currently a playing for Dinamo Riga of the Kontinental Hockey League (KHL).

== Playing career ==
As a junior, Bērziņš played for SK Riga, before joining Dinamo Riga junior club HK Rīga of MHL in 2016. Next season he made his debut at senior level in KHL with Dinamo Riga, in win against Neftekhimik on 4 January 2018. He scored his first KHL goal same season on 1 March against Jokerit

== Career statistics ==
=== Regular season and playoffs ===
			Regular season					Playoffs
Season	Team	League	GP	G	A	Pts	PIM	GP	G	A	Pts	PIM
2014–15	SK Riga 16	Rus.16	35	17	15	32	18	—	—	—	—	—
2014–15	SK Riga 16	Lat.18	24	6	7	13	30	—	—	—	—	—
2015–16	SK Riga 17	Rus.17	28	8	8	17	22	—	—	—	—	—
2015–16	SK Riga 17	LHL	20	4	3	7	8	—	—	—	—	—
2015–16	HS Riga	LHL	5	3	1	4	2	—	—	—	—	—
2016–17	HK Riga	MHL	48	7	1	8	57	—	—	—	—	—
2016–17	HS Riga	LHL	1	0	1	0	0	5	0	2	2	4
2017–18	Dinamo Riga	KHL	7	1	0	1	0	—	—	—	—	—
2017–18	HK Riga	MHL	50	8	6	14	45	—	—	—	—	—
2018–19	Dinamo Riga	KHL	38	0	0	0	8	—	—	—	—	—
2018–19	HK Riga	MHL	11	3	4	7	6	—	—	—	—	—
2019–20	Dinamo Riga	KHL	39	4	2	6	18	—	—	—	—	—
2019–20	HK Liepājas Metalurgs	LHL	1	0	0	0	0	—	—	—	—	—
2020–21	Dinamo Riga	KHL	45	2	2	4	15	—	—	—	—	—
KHL totals			129	7	4	11	41	—	—	—	—	—

=== International ===
Year	Team	Event	Result	GP	G	A	Pts	PIM
2017	Latvia	U18	10th	7	0	2	2	2
2018	Latvia	WJC-D1	12th	5	2	0	2	2
2019	Latvia	WJC-D1	14th	5	2	1	3	4
Junior totals				17	4	3	7	8
