= Deniss Smirnovs =

Latvian ice hockey player

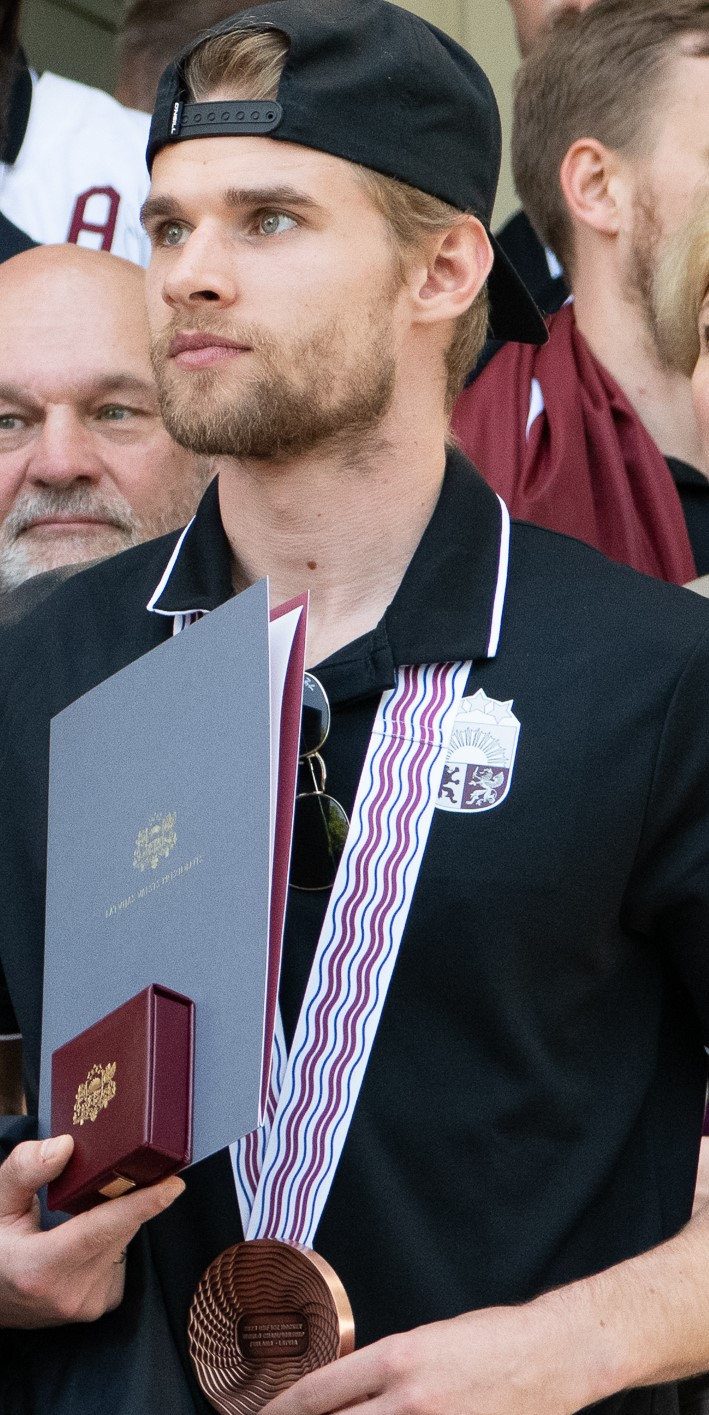
- Deniss Smirnovs, 2023
- Born: March 7, 1999 (age 27) Riga, Latvia
- Height: 5 ft 10 in (178 cm)
- Weight: 180 lb (82 kg; 12 st 12 lb)
- Position: Centre
- Shoots: Left
- NL team Former teams: EHC Kloten; Genève-Servette HC
- National team: Latvia
- Playing career: 2019–present

Deniss Smirnovs (born 7 March 1999) is a Latvian professional ice hockey player who is a centre for EHC Kloten of the National League (NL). He previously played with Genève-Servette HC and won a NL title with the team in 2023.

Smirnovs played his junior hockey in Switzerland which allows him to compete in the NL and the SL with a Swiss player-license.

== Playing career ==
On August 8, 2019, Smirnovs signed his first professional contract with Genève-Servette HC, after having played 5 seasons with the organization's junior teams.

Smirnovs made his National League debut with Genève-Servette HC on September 13, 2019 against the SCL Tigers at the Ilfis Stadium. He scored his first NL goal that day and picked up an assist to become the team's PostFinance Top Scorer for their Home Opener the next day against EHC Biel.

== International play ==
Medal record

Representing Latvia

Ice hockey

World Championships
| Bronze medal – third place | 2023 Finland/Latvia | |

Smirnovs made his debut with Latvia men's national ice hockey team in 2018.

He represented Latvia at the 2023 IIHF World Championship where he recorded one assist and won a bronze medal, Latvia's first ever IIHF World Championship medal.

== Personal life ==
Smirnovs left Latvia and moved to Geneva in 2014 at age 15 to continue his junior career.

He is fluent in Russian, Latvian and French.

== Career statistics ==
=== Regular season and playoffs ===
| | | | Regular season | | | | | Playoffs |
| Season | Team | League | GP | G | A | Pts | PIM | GP | G | A | Pts | PIM |
|---|---|---|---|---|---|---|---|---|---|---|---|---|
| 2013–14 | SK Rīga 16 | LAT U16 | | 14 | 32 | 46 | | — | — | — | — | — |
| 2013–14 | SK Rīga 17 | LAT U18 | 8 | 6 | 15 | 21 | 4 | — | — | — | — | — |
| 2014–15 | Genève–Servette HC | SUI U17 | 30 | 17 | 35 | 52 | 10 | 7 | 5 | 8 | 13 | 4 |
| 2014–15 | Genève–Servette HC II | SUI.2 U17 | 1 | 1 | 2 | 3 | 0 | — | — | — | — | — |
| 2015–16 | Genève–Servette HC | SUI U17 | 41 | 25 | 43 | 68 | 18 | 14 | 8 | 14 | 22 | 16 |
| 2016–17 | Genève–Servette HC | SUI U20 | 25 | 7 | 14 | 21 | 16 | 8 | 4 | 5 | 9 | 12 |
| 2017–18 | Genève–Servette HC | SUI U20 | 36 | 21 | 30 | 51 | 14 | 9 | 2 | 4 | 6 | 2 |
| 2018–19 | Genève–Servette HC | SUI U20 | 19 | 10 | 17 | 27 | 28 | 10 | 6 | 4 | 10 | 8 |
| 2019–20 | Genève–Servette HC | NL | 46 | 8 | 11 | 19 | 10 | — | — | — | — | — |
| 2020–21 | Genève–Servette HC | NL | 44 | 2 | 7 | 9 | 14 | 5 | 1 | 1 | 2 | 0 |
| 2021–22 | Genève–Servette HC | NL | 52 | 2 | 9 | 11 | 10 | 2 | 0 | 0 | 0 | 0 |
| NL totals | | | 142 | 12 | 27 | 39 | 34 | 7 | 1 | 1 | 2 | 0 |

=== International ===
| Year | Team | Event | GP | G | A | Pts | PIM |
|---|---|---|---|---|---|---|---|
| 2016 | Latvia | U18 | 7 | 3 | 0 | 3 | 4 |
| 2017 | Latvia | WJC | 6 | 0 | 0 | 0 | 2 |
| 2017 | Latvia | U18 | 7 | 1 | 2 | 3 | 0 |
| 2018 | Latvia | WJC D1A | 5 | 2 | 3 | 5 | 6 |
| 2019 | Latvia | WJC D1A | 5 | 1 | 2 | 3 | 12 |
| 2021 | Latvia | OGQ | 3 | 0 | 0 | 0 | 0 |
| 2022 | Latvia | OG | 4 | 0 | 1 | 1 | 2 |
| 2022 | Latvia | WC | 7 | 0 | 0 | 0 | 0 |
| 2023 | Latvia | WC | 9 | 0 | 1 | 1 | 2 |
| 2024 | Latvia | OGQ | 1 | 0 | 0 | 0 | 0 |
| 2026 | Latvia | WC | 8 | 3 | 6 | 9 | 0 |
| Junior totals | | | 30 | 7 | 7 | 14 | 24 |
| Senior totals | | | 32 | 3 | 8 | 11 | 4 |
