= Gabriel Vilardi =

Canadian ice hockey player (born 1999)

Gabe Vilardi
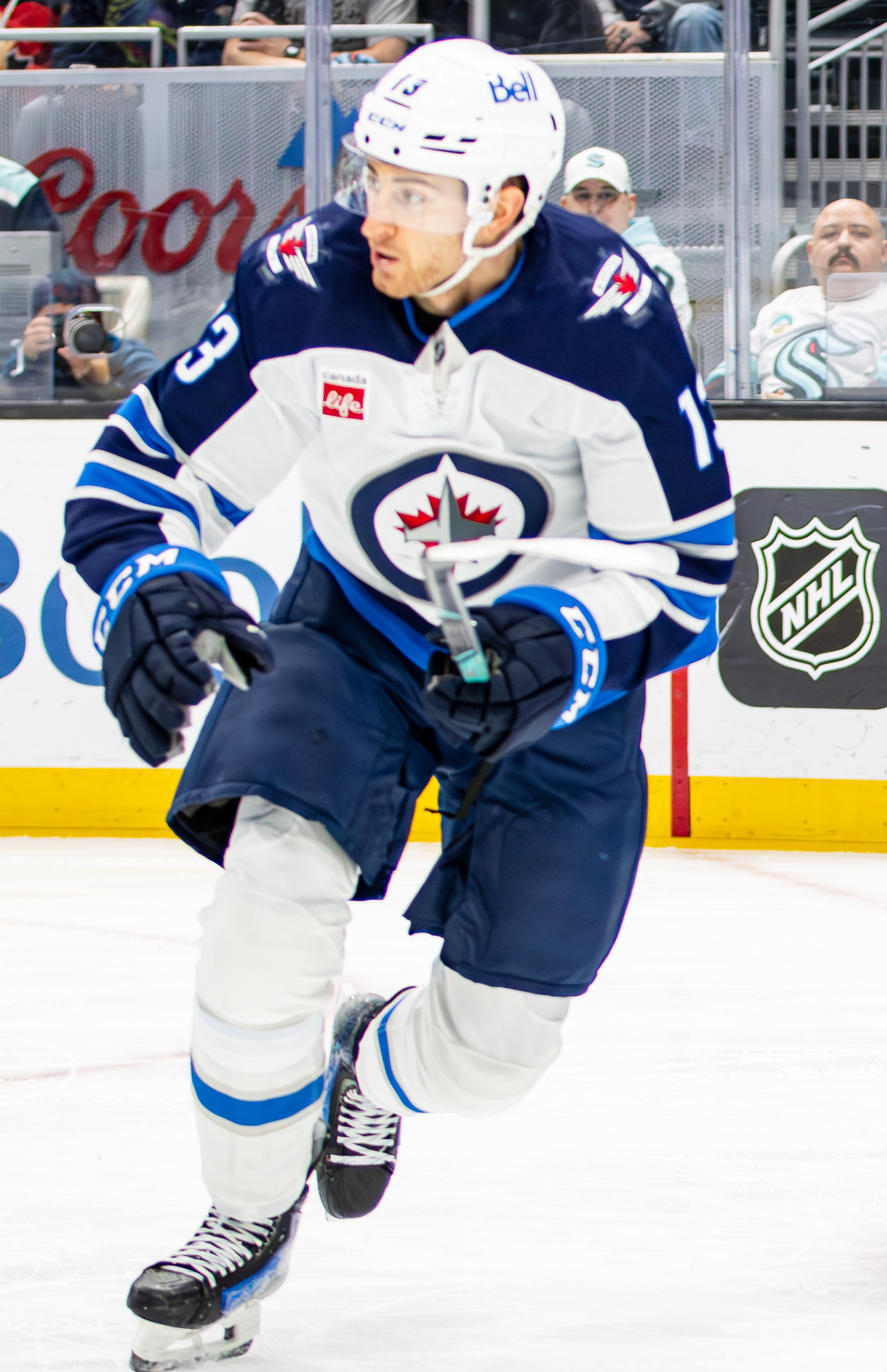
- Vilardi with the Winnipeg Jets in 2025
- Born: August 16, 1999 (age 26) Kingston, Ontario, Canada
- Height: 6 ft 3 in (191 cm)
- Weight: 216 lb (98 kg; 15 st 6 lb)
- Position: Forward
- Shoots: Right
- NHL team Former teams: Winnipeg Jets; Los Angeles Kings
- National team: Canada
- NHL draft: 11th overall, 2017; Los Angeles Kings
- Playing career: 2018–present

Gabriel Vilardi (born August 16, 1999) is a Canadian professional ice hockey player who is a forward for the Winnipeg Jets of the National Hockey League (NHL). He was drafted eleventh overall by the Los Angeles Kings in the 2017 NHL entry draft.

== Playing career ==
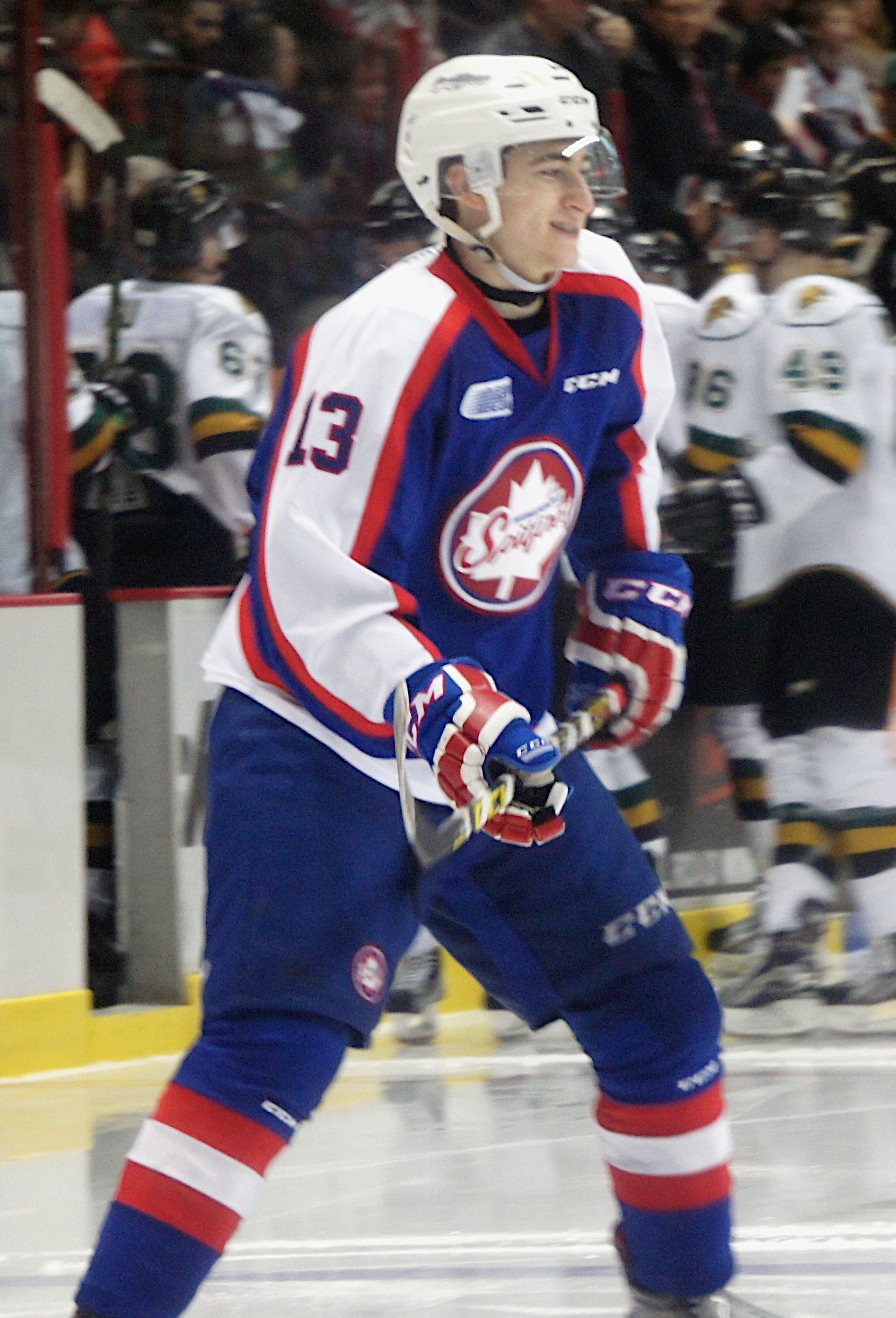
Vilardi with the Windsor Spitfires in 2016.

Vilardi was drafted in the first round, second overall, in the 2015 OHL Priority Selection by the Windsor Spitfires. While Vilardi is a natural centre he primarily played as a winger with Windsor.

Leading up to the NHL draft, Vilardi was seen as a top prospect and was ranked the No. 4 North American skater by NHL Central Scouting Bureau. Craig Button of TSN described him as a big and strong centre with so much offensive upside.

In the 2017–18 season, on January 1, 2018, Vilardi along with Sean Day were traded by the Spitfires to the Kingston Frontenacs in exchange for Cody Morgan and six draft picks. On March 1, 2018, Vilardi signed a three-year entry-level contract with the Los Angeles Kings.

Due to a chronic back issue, Vilardi did not make his professional debut with the Ontario Reign, the Kings' American Hockey League affiliate, until November 29, 2018. He earned his first professional point three days later against the Tucson Roadrunners. On December 10, the Kings loaned Vilardi to Team Canada for a chance to compete at the 2019 World Junior Ice Hockey Championships.

Having recovered from his back issue, Vilardi found a more consistent spot with the Reign, playing 32 games in 2019–20, scoring 9 goals and 16 assists for 25 points. On February 20, 2020, Vilardi was recalled to the Kings from the Ontario Reign. He made his NHL debut later that night against the Florida Panthers. On his first career shot, Vilardi fired a wrist shot past Panthers goaltender Sergei Bobrovsky. Vilardi set a new NHL record, scoring his first career goal 6 seconds into his first career shift. Vilardi added an assist in the second period on a goal scored by Martin Frk.

As a restricted free agent, Vilardi was signed to a one-year, $825,000 contract extension with the Kings on July 23, 2022.

On June 27, 2023, Vilardi was traded by the Kings, alongside Alex Iafallo, Rasmus Kupari, and a 2024 2nd-round draft pick, to the Winnipeg Jets in exchange for Pierre-Luc Dubois. On April 4, 2024, Vilardi scored his first career NHL hat trick in a 5-2 Jets win over the visiting Calgary Flames.

On July 18, 2025, Vilardi signed a six-year, $45 million contract to remain with the Jets.

== Personal life ==
Vilardi was born to Italian parents Natale Vilardi and Giovanna Siviglia who moved from Reggio Calabria to Kingston, Ontario. His older brother Francesco played three seasons in the Ontario Hockey League, and three seasons for the Queen's University hockey team.

== Career statistics ==
=== Regular season and playoffs ===
			Regular season					Playoffs
Season	Team	League	GP	G	A	Pts	PIM	GP	G	A	Pts	PIM
2014–15	CIHA Voyageurs	OEMHL	21	18	21	39	12	—	—	—	—	—
2015–16	Windsor Spitfires	OHL	62	17	21	38	14	5	1	3	4	2
2016–17	Windsor Spitfires	OHL	49	29	32	61	12	7	2	4	6	4
2017–18	Kingston Frontenacs	OHL	32	22	36	58	14	16	11	11	22	14
2018–19	Ontario Reign	AHL	4	0	1	1	0	—	—	—	—	—
2019–20	Ontario Reign	AHL	32	9	16	25	14	—	—	—	—	—
2019–20	Los Angeles Kings	NHL	10	3	4	7	4	—	—	—	—	—
2020–21	Los Angeles Kings	NHL	54	10	13	23	6	—	—	—	—	—
2021–22	Los Angeles Kings	NHL	25	5	2	7	8	2	0	0	0	0
2021–22	Ontario Reign	AHL	39	15	23	38	18	—	—	—	—	—
2022–23	Los Angeles Kings	NHL	63	23	18	41	18	5	2	2	4	0
2023–24	Winnipeg Jets	NHL	47	22	14	36	14	5	0	4	4	6
2024–25	Winnipeg Jets	NHL	71	27	34	61	14	9	1	3	4	4
2025–26	Winnipeg Jets	NHL	82	30	39	69	24	—	—	—	—	—
NHL totals			352	120	124	244	88	21	3	9	12	10

Medal record

Representing Canada

Ice hockey

World Championships
Gold medal – first place	2021 Latvia	

=== International ===
Year	Team	Event	Result	GP	G	A	Pts	PIM
2015	Canada White	U17	1st place, gold medalist(s)	6	4	3	7	0
2021	Canada	WC	1st place, gold medalist(s)	10	0	1	1	6
2026	Canada	WC	4th	10	3	4	7	2
Junior totals				6	4	3	7	0
Senior totals				20	3	5	8	8

Awards and achievements
Preceded by Adrian Kempe	Los Angeles Kings first-round draft pick 2017	Succeeded by Rasmus Kupari
