= BCF Arena =

Ice hockey venue in Switzerland

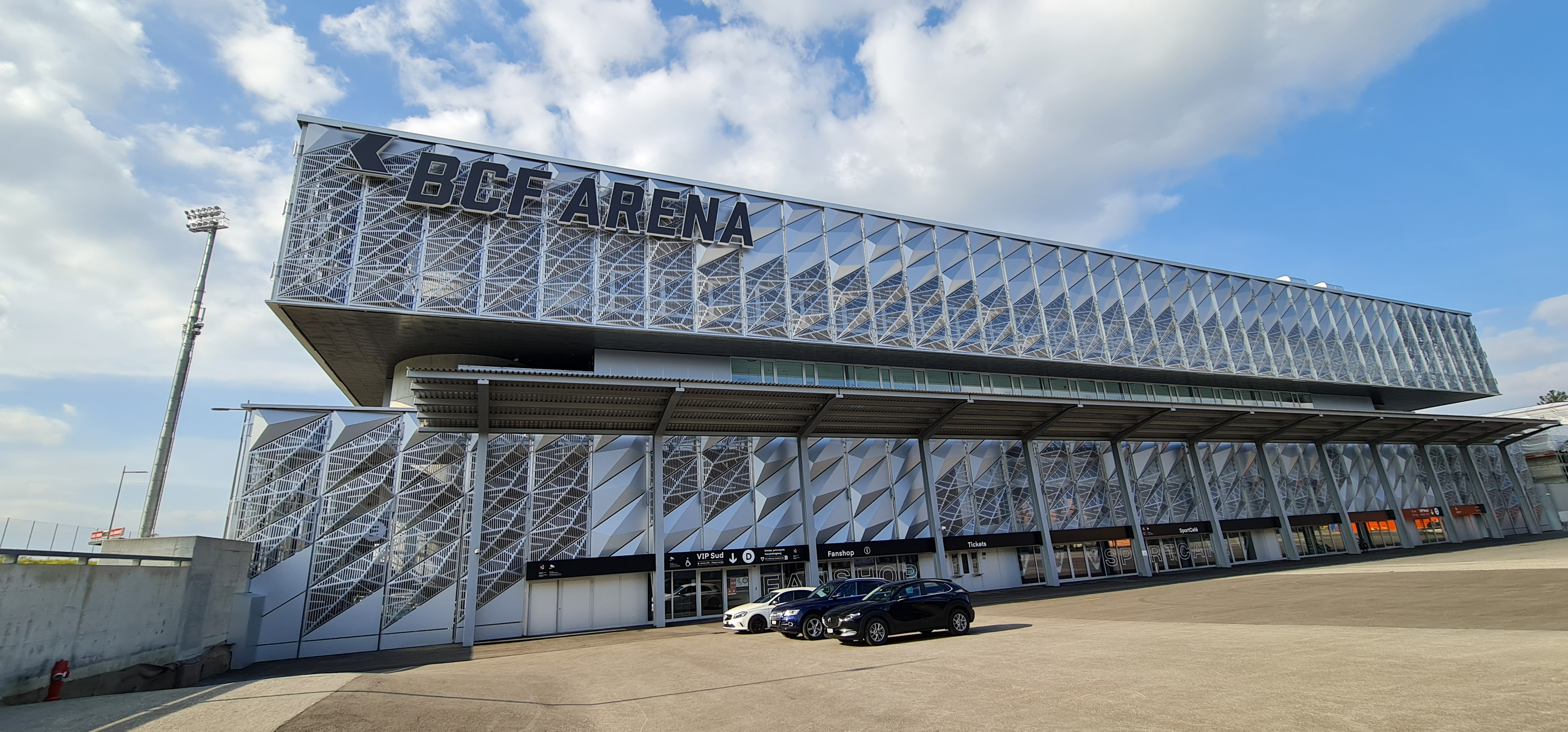
- Interactive map of BCF Arena
- Former names: Patinoire Saint-Léonard
- Location: Fribourg, Switzerland
- Coordinates: 46.8174°N 7.1555°E
- Capacity: 9,372

Construction
- Opened: 1983
- Renovated: 2010, 2018–2020

Tenant
- HC Fribourg-Gottéron (NL) (1983–present)

BCF Arena (formerly Patinoire Saint-Léonard) is an indoor sporting arena in Fribourg, Switzerland. Built in 1983 and then completely rebuilt from 2018 to 2020, the capacity of the arena is 9,262 spectators. It is the home arena of ice hockey team HC Fribourg-Gottéron of the National League.

Major renovations began in the summer of 2018 to increase the arena's capacity from 6,500 to 8,934 and were completed two years later in the summer of 2020. The completely renovated arena features 6,434 seats and a standing capacity of 2,500. There are also 6 restaurants and 12 concessions stands, 336 seats in various suites and 76 Dine & View seats.

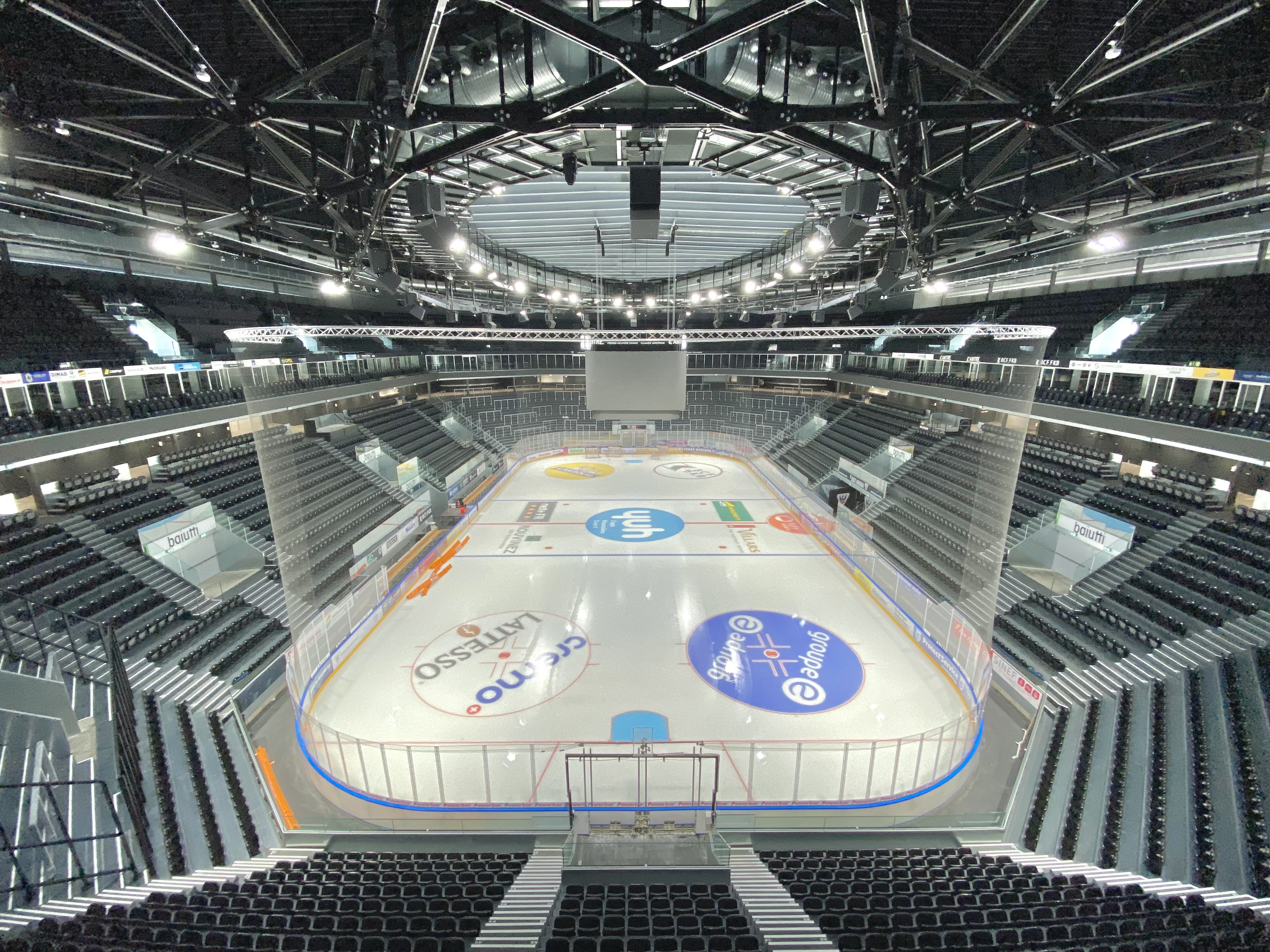
Inside the BCF-Arena in Fribourg.

== See also ==
- List of indoor arenas in Switzerland
