= Sebastián Čederle =

Slovak ice hockey player (born 2000)

- Čederle in 2026
- Born: 21 February 2000 (age 26) Skalica, Slovakia
- Height: 6 ft 2 in (188 cm)
- Weight: 190 lb (86 kg; 13 st 8 lb)
- Position: Forward
- Shoots: Left
- Swedish Hockey League team Former teams: Färjestad BK; HK Nitra; Bílí Tygři Liberec
- National team: Slovakia
- NHL draft: undrafted
- Playing career: 2021–present

Sebastián Čederle (born 21 February 2000) is a Slovak professional ice hockey player who is a forward for Färjestad BK of the Swedish Hockey League.

== Early life ==
Sebastián Čederle was born on 21 February 2000 in Skalica. He never met his biological father. His stepfather introduced him to ice hockey at the age of three.

=== Playing career ===
Čederle played with the local team HK 36 Skalica in junior categories, where he gradually established himself as one of the more prominent talents in the youth ranks. At the age of 15, he won a silver medal in Boys' individual skills challenge at the 2016 Winter Youth Olympics.

He continued his development in the junior team of Rögle BK, where he played and shared a room with Martin Vitaloš, who would later become his teammate at HK Nitra and in the national team. After the start of COVID-19 pandemic, Čederle worked for a month at a supermarket in Skalica to help finance a professional summer training camp.

In 2020, Čederle signed his first professional contract with the Czech outfit Bílí Tygři Liberec. At Liberec, he failed to make a breakthrough and eventually persuaded the team to let him depart for HK Nitra after two years. In Nitra, Čederle, quickly established himself as a team leader by making a major contribution to league title victory in 2024.

Following excellent performances in the 2025 session, Čederle debuted in the national team at the 2025 IIHF World Championship.

In the 2026 session, Nitra won the Slovak championship again with Čederle being named the Most valuable player. Following the session, he transferred to the Swedish outfit Färjestad BK.

== Player statistics ==
			Regular season					Playoffs
Season	Team	League	GP	G	A	Pts	PIM	GP	G	A	Pts	PIM
2021–22	Bílí Tygři Liberec	Czech Republic	8	0	1	1	0	1	0	0	0	0
2022–23	Bílí Tygři Liberec	Czech Republic	7	0	0	0	2	—	—	—	—	—
2022–23	HK Nitra (Loan)	Slovakia	29	5	6	11	4	5	0	0	0	0
2023–24	HK Nitra	Slovakia	41	8	12	20	10	21	5	6	11	0
2024–25	HK Nitra	Slovakia	34	15	9	24	8	20	9	1	10	2
Czech Republic totals			15	0	1	1	2	1	0	0	0	0
Slovakia totals			104	28	27	55	22	46	14	7	21	2

== Awards and honors ==
Award	Year	Ref
Slovak
Champion	2024, 2026	
