= Emīls Ģēģeris =

Latvian ice hockey player

- Born: 23 July 1999 (age 26) Riga, Latvia
- Height: 6 ft 0 in (183 cm)
- Weight: 185 lb (84 kg; 13 st 3 lb)
- Position: Forward
- Shoots: Left
- Czech2 team Former teams: HC Poruba; HS Rīga; Dinamo Riga; HK Zemgale/LBTU; Anglet Hormadi Élite; Scorpions de Mulhouse; Jokers de Cergy-Pontoise; HC Nové Zámky; Boxers de Bordeaux
- National team: Latvia
- Playing career: 2017–present

Emīls Ģēģeris (born 23 July 1999) is a Latvian ice hockey forward playing for the HC RT Torax Poruba in the 1st Czech Republic Hockey League.
