= Samuel Kňažko =

Slovak ice hockey player (born 2002)

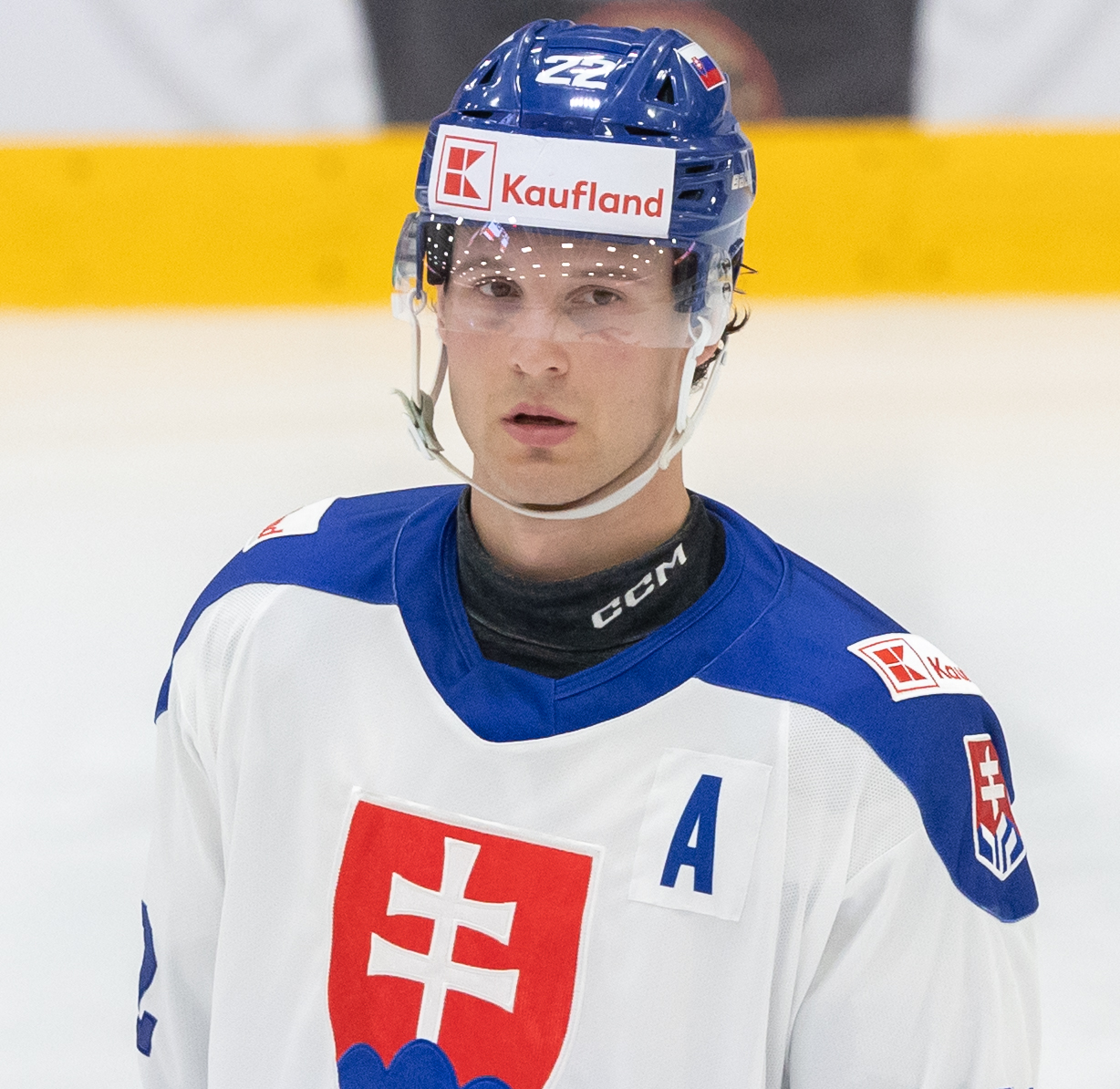
- Kňažko with Slovakia in 2026
- Born: 7 August 2002 (age 23) Trenčín, Slovakia
- Height: 6 ft 1 in (185 cm)
- Weight: 190 lb (86 kg; 13 st 8 lb)
- Position: Defence
- Shoots: Left
- ELH team Former teams: HC Vítkovice; TPS; Columbus Blue Jackets
- National team: Slovakia
- NHL draft: 78th overall, 2020; Columbus Blue Jackets
- Playing career: 2021–present

Samuel Kňažko (born 7 August 2002) is a Slovak professional ice hockey player who is a defenceman for HC Vítkovice in the Czech Extraliga (ELH).

== Playing career ==
Kňažko was selected 78th overall by the Blue Jackets in the 2020 NHL Entry Draft.

After his selection by the Blue Jackets, Kňažko was signed to a three-year, entry-level contract with Blue Jackets on June 9, 2021.

Following three seasons within the Blue Jackets organization, Kňažko left as a free agent and returned to Europe in agreeing to a two-year contract with Czech club, HC Vítkovice of the ELH, on 16 July 2025.

== International play ==
Medal record

Representing Slovakia

Ice hockey

Olympic Games
Bronze medal – third place	2022 Beijing	

Kňažko served as Slovakia's captain in the 2021 and 2022 editions of the IIHF World Junior Championship.

He was selected to make his full IIHF international debut, participating for Slovakia in the 2021 IIHF World Championship.

Kňažko was selected for the 2022 Olympics in Beijing.

== Career statistics ==
=== Regular season and playoffs ===
			Regular season					Playoffs
Season	Team	League	GP	G	A	Pts	PIM	GP	G	A	Pts	PIM
2015–16	HK Dukla Trenčín	SVK U18	4	1	2	3	0	—	—	—	—	—
2016–17	HK Dukla Trenčín	SVK U18	43	7	16	23	8	8	0	3	3	4
2017–18	HK Dukla Trenčín	SVK U18	24	4	18	22	10	5	0	5	5	6
2017–18	HK Dukla Trenčín	SVK U20	21	4	6	10	8	17	1	5	6	4
2018–19	TPS	FIN U18	5	1	1	2	0	1	1	0	1	0
2018–19	TPS	FIN U20	49	2	15	17	8	—	—	—	—	—
2019–20	TPS	FIN U20	48	7	21	28	6	3	1	0	1	0
2020–21	TPS	FIN U20	23	5	10	15	22	2	0	2	2	2
2021–22	TPS	FIN U20	15	4	10	14	4	—	—	—	—	—
2021–22	TPS	Liiga	1	0	0	0	0	—	—	—	—	—
2021–22	Seattle Thunderbirds	WHL	27	5	15	20	12	25	1	5	6	2
2022–23	Cleveland Monsters	AHL	50	1	20	21	17	—	—	—	—	—
2022–23	Columbus Blue Jackets	NHL	2	0	0	0	0	—	—	—	—	—
2023–24	Cleveland Monsters	AHL	44	2	10	12	12	2	0	1	1	2
2024–25	Cleveland Monsters	AHL	55	4	12	16	14	3	0	2	2	0
2025–26	HC Vítkovice Ridera	ELH	42	2	13	15	20	3	1	0	1	2
Liiga totals			1	0	0	0	0	—	—	—	—	—
NHL totals			2	0	0	0	0	—	—	—	—	—

=== International ===
Year	Team	Event	GP	G	A	Pts	PIM
2018	Slovakia	WJC18	5	2	1	3	0
2018	Slovakia	HG18	4	0	2	2	4
2019	Slovakia	WJC18	7	0	0	0	4
2019	Slovakia	HG18	4	0	0	0	2
2020	Slovakia	WJC	5	0	1	1	4
2021	Slovakia	WJC	4	0	1	1	14
2021	Slovakia	WC	8	0	0	0	0
2021	Slovakia	OGQ	3	0	0	0	0
2022	Slovakia	WJC	2	0	1	1	0
2022	Slovakia	OG	7	0	1	1	2
2023	Slovakia	WC	7	0	3	3	2
2024	Slovakia	OGQ	3	0	2	2	2
2025	Slovakia	WC	6	0	2	2	2
2026	Slovakia	WC	7	0	4	4	2
Junior totals			31	2	6	8	26
Senior totals			41	0	12	12	10
