= 2011 World Junior Ice Hockey Championships – Division II =

2011 IIHF U20 World Championship Division II

Tournament details
- Host countries: Estonia; Romania
- Venues: 2 (in 2 host cities)
- Dates: 13–19 December 2010
- Teams: 12

The 2011 World Junior Ice Hockey Championship Division II was a pair of international ice hockey tournaments organized by the International Ice Hockey Federation. Six teams played in each of the two groups. In addition to the usual promotion and relegation, the format (following this year) changed from two parallel tournaments, to two tiered tournaments. This means that the teams who finished 2nd and 3rd will be grouped together with the two relegated teams from Division I, and the teams who finished 4th and 5th will be grouped with the two promoted teams from Division III.

== Group A ==
The Group A tournament was played in Tallinn, Estonia, from 13 to 19 December 2010.

=== Participating teams ===
| Team | Qualification |
|---|---|
| France | Placed 6th in Division I (Group A) last year and were relegated. |
| Netherlands | Placed 2nd in Division II (Group B) last year. |
| Spain | Placed 3rd in Division II (Group A) last year. |
| Belgium | Placed 4th in Division II (Group B) last year. |
| Estonia | Hosts; placed 5th in Division II (Group B) last year. |
| Iceland | Placed 2nd in Division III last year and were promoted. |

=== Final standings ===
| Pos | Team | Pld | W | OTW | OTL | L | GF | GA | GD | Pts | Promotion, qualification or relegation |
|---|---|---|---|---|---|---|---|---|---|---|---|
| 1 | France | 5 | 5 | 0 | 0 | 0 | 49 | 5 | +44 | 15 | Promoted to the 2012 Division I B |
| 2 | Netherlands | 5 | 3 | 0 | 1 | 1 | 19 | 16 | +3 | 10 | Qualified for the 2012 Division II A |
| 3 | Spain | 5 | 3 | 0 | 0 | 2 | 12 | 16 | −4 | 9 | Qualified for the 2012 Division II A |
| 4 | Belgium | 5 | 1 | 1 | 0 | 3 | 17 | 34 | −17 | 5 | Qualified for the 2012 Division II B |
| 5 | Estonia (H) | 5 | 1 | 0 | 0 | 4 | 16 | 29 | −13 | 3 | Qualified for the 2012 Division II B |
| 6 | Iceland | 5 | 1 | 0 | 0 | 4 | 10 | 23 | −13 | 3 | Relegated to the 2012 Division III |

Source: IIHF
(H) Host

=== Match results ===
All times are local (Eastern European Time – UTC+2).

| 13 December 2010; 13:00 | Iceland | 5–1 (1–1, 1–0, 3–0) | Belgium | Arena Premia, Tallinn |

Game reference

| 13 December 2010; 16:30 | Spain | 1–8 (0–2, 0–2, 1–4) | France | Arena Premia, Tallinn |

Game reference

| 13 December 2010; 20:00 | Netherlands | 5–2 (2–2, 0–0, 3–0) | Estonia | Arena Premia, Tallinn |

Game reference

| 14 December 2010; 13:00 | France | 15–0 (5–0, 5–0, 5–0) | Belgium | Arena Premia, Tallinn |

Game reference

| 14 December 2010; 16:30 | Netherlands | 3–1 (1–0, 1–0, 1–1) | Spain | Arena Premia, Tallinn |

Game reference

| 14 December 2010; 20:00 | Estonia | 7–1 (0–1, 4–0, 3–0) | Iceland | Arena Premia, Tallinn |

Game reference

| 16 December 2010; 13:00 | Netherlands | 5–1 (1–1, 1–0, 3–0) | Iceland | Arena Premia, Tallinn |

Game reference

| 16 December 2010; 16:30 | Spain | 5–2 (2–1, 1–0, 2–1) | Belgium | Arena Premia, Tallinn |

Game reference

| 16 December 2010; 20:00 | France | 11–0 (4–0, 4–0, 3–0) | Estonia | Arena Premia, Tallinn |

Game reference

| 17 December 2010; 13:00 | Belgium | 6–5 GWS (2–2, 1–1, 2–2) (0–0, 1–0) | Netherlands | Arena Premia, Tallinn |

Game reference

| 17 December 2010; 16:30 | Iceland | 3–9 (1–2, 0–4, 2–3) | France | Arena Premia, Tallinn |

Game reference

| 17 December 2010; 20:00 | Estonia | 3–4 (1–1, 1–1, 1–2) | Spain | Arena Premia, Tallinn |

Game reference

| 19 December 2010; 13:00 | Spain | 1–0 (1–0, 0–0, 0–0) | Iceland | Arena Premia, Tallinn |

Game reference

| 19 December 2010; 16:30 | France | 6–1 (4–0, 2–1, 0–0) | Netherlands | Arena Premia, Tallinn |

Game reference

| 19 December 2010; 20:00 | Belgium | 8–4 (3–0, 4–3, 1–1) | Estonia | Arena Premia, Tallinn |

Game reference

== Group B ==
The Group B tournament was played in Miercurea Ciuc, Romania, from 13 to 19 December 2010.

=== Participating teams ===
| Team | Qualification |
|---|---|
| Poland | Placed 6th in Division I (Group B) last year and were relegated. |
| Hungary | Placed 2nd in Division II (Group A) last year. |
| Romania | Hosts; placed 3rd in Division II (Group B) last year. |
| South Korea | Placed 4th in Division II (Group A) last year. |
| China | Placed 5th in Division II (Group A) last year. |
| Australia | Placed 1st in Division III last year and were promoted. |

=== Final standings ===
| Pos | Team | Pld | W | OTW | OTL | L | GF | GA | GD | Pts | Promotion, qualification or relegation |
|---|---|---|---|---|---|---|---|---|---|---|---|
| 1 | Poland | 5 | 5 | 0 | 0 | 0 | 61 | 10 | +51 | 15 | Promoted to the 2012 Division I B |
| 2 | Hungary | 5 | 4 | 0 | 0 | 1 | 50 | 16 | +34 | 12 | Qualified for the 2012 Division II A |
| 3 | South Korea | 5 | 3 | 0 | 0 | 2 | 27 | 30 | −3 | 9 | Qualified for the 2012 Division II A |
| 4 | Romania (H) | 5 | 2 | 0 | 0 | 3 | 16 | 24 | −8 | 6 | Qualified for the 2012 Division II B |
| 5 | Australia | 5 | 1 | 0 | 0 | 4 | 21 | 39 | −18 | 3 | Qualified for the 2012 Division II B |
| 6 | China | 5 | 0 | 0 | 0 | 5 | 10 | 66 | −56 | 0 | Relegated to the 2012 Division III |

Source: IIHF
(H) Host

=== Match results ===
All times are local (Eastern European Time – UTC+2).

| 13 December 2010; 13:00 | Australia | 5–7 (0–4, 4–2, 1–1) | South Korea | Lajos Vákár Ice Hall, Miercurea Ciuc |

Game reference

| 13 December 2010; 16:30 | Hungary | 20–0 (11–0, 3–0, 6–0) | China | Lajos Vákár Ice Hall, Miercurea Ciuc |

Game reference

| 13 December 2010; 20:00 | Romania | 1–8 (1–3, 0–2, 0–3) | Poland | Lajos Vákár Ice Hall, Miercurea Ciuc |

Game reference

| 14 December 2010; 13:00 | China | 3–10 (0–2, 0–5, 3–3) | Australia | Lajos Vákár Ice Hall, Miercurea Ciuc |

Game reference

| 14 December 2010; 16:30 | Poland | 10–3 (6–0, 2–1, 2–2) | South Korea | Lajos Vákár Ice Hall, Miercurea Ciuc |

Game reference

| 14 December 2010; 20:00 | Hungary | 7–0 (3–0, 4–0, 0–0) | Romania | Lajos Vákár Ice Hall, Miercurea Ciuc |

Game reference

| 16 December 2010; 13:00 | Poland | 20–0 (4–0, 6–0, 10–0) | China | Lajos Vákár Ice Hall, Miercurea Ciuc |

Game reference

| 16 December 2010; 16:30 | Hungary | 9–4 (4–2, 3–2, 2–0) | Australia | Lajos Vákár Ice Hall, Miercurea Ciuc |

Game reference

| 16 December 2010; 20:00 | Romania | 3–4 (2–1, 1–1, 0–2) | South Korea | Lajos Vákár Ice Hall, Miercurea Ciuc |

Game reference

| 17 December 2010; 13:00 | Australia | 0–14 (0–3, 0–4, 0–7) | Poland | Lajos Vákár Ice Hall, Miercurea Ciuc |

Game reference

| 17 December 2010; 16:30 | South Korea | 3–8 (0–6, 1–2, 2–0) | Hungary | Lajos Vákár Ice Hall, Miercurea Ciuc |

Game reference

| 17 December 2010; 20:00 | China | 3–6 (1–1, 0–2, 2–3) | Romania | Lajos Vákár Ice Hall, Miercurea Ciuc |

Game reference

| 19 December 2010; 13:00 | South Korea | 10–4 (5–2, 2–2, 3–0) | China | Lajos Vákár Ice Hall, Miercurea Ciuc |

Game reference

| 19 December 2010; 16:30 | Poland | 9–6 (4–1, 4–4, 1–1) | Hungary | Lajos Vákár Ice Hall, Miercurea Ciuc |

Game reference

| 19 December 2010; 20:00 | Romania | 6–2 (2–1, 2–0, 2–1) | Australia | Lajos Vákár Ice Hall, Miercurea Ciuc |

Game reference

== Statistics ==
=== Top 10 scorers ===
| Pos | Player | Country | GP | G | A | Pts | +/− | PIM |
|---|---|---|---|---|---|---|---|---|
| 1 | Aron Chmielewski | Poland | 5 | 13 | 7 | 20 | +18 | 25 |
| 2 | Tamas Virag | Hungary | 5 | 10 | 9 | 19 | +14 | 8 |
| 3 | Jinwoo Oh | South Korea | 5 | 8 | 8 | 16 | +4 | 4 |
| 4 | Bong Jin Lee | South Korea | 5 | 3 | 13 | 16 | +7 | 4 |
| 5 | Eliot Berthon | France | 5 | 7 | 8 | 15 | +14 | 2 |
| 6 | Nicolas Ritz | France | 5 | 6 | 9 | 15 | +15 | 6 |
| 7 | Balazs Somogyi | Hungary | 5 | 8 | 6 | 14 | +7 | 12 |
| 8 | Patryk Kogut | Poland | 5 | 7 | 7 | 14 | +16 | 6 |
| 9 | Robin Gaborit | France | 5 | 7 | 6 | 13 | +11 | 12 |
| 9 | Jungyun Yum | South Korea | 5 | 7 | 6 | 13 | +3 | 16 |

=== Goaltending leaders ===
(minimum 40% team's total ice time)

| Pos | Player | Country | MINS | GA | Sv% | GAA | SO |
|---|---|---|---|---|---|---|---|
| 1 | Robert Kowalowka | Poland | 129:39 | 1 | 96.43 | 0.46 | 2 |
| 2 | Sebastian Ylonen | France | 180:00 | 2 | 95.24 | .67 | 1 |
| 3 | Leo Bertein | France | 120:00 | 2 | 92.59 | 1.00 | 1 |
| 4 | Ander Alcaine | Spain | 299:02 | 16 | 92.27 | 3.21 | 1 |
| 5 | Aevar Bjornsson | Iceland | 299:35 | 23 | 90.65 | 4.61 | 0 |
