= Australia men's national junior ice hockey team =

Australia
- Association: Ice Hockey Australia
- Head coach: David Ruck
- Assistants: Jason Kvisle
- Most games: Aubyn Martin (19)
- Most points: Michael Beaton (24)
- Team colors
- IIHF code: AUS

First international
- Romania 10–2 Australia (Bucharest, Romania; 3 March 1983)

Biggest win
- Australia 28–0 South Africa (Istanbul, Turkey; 30 January 2023)

Biggest defeat
- Yugoslavia 21–1 Australia (Esbjerg, Denmark; 22 March 1987)

IIHF World Junior Championship
- Appearances: 27 (first in 1983 Group C)
- Best result: 20th overall (1983)

International record (W–L–T)
- 26–66–1

The Australian men's national under 20 ice hockey team is the national under-20 ice hockey team of Australia. The team represents Australia at the International Ice Hockey Federation's World Junior Hockey Championship Division III.

== History ==
The men's junior team played its first game on 3 March 1983 against Romania which they lost 10 – 2. They played five other games in 1983 against Bulgaria, Hungary and Romania losing every game. The following year Australia played four games, again losing every game and achieving their largest ever loss with a21–1 defeat by Yugoslavia. Australia did not play again until 1987 where they again lost all their games. The team took a longer break, not returning to international play until 2000 where they recorded their first win against Iceland, outscoring them 8 – 4. In 2008 Australia achieved their highest winning margin with a 16 – 0 win over Bulgaria. Australia finished first in the 2010 World Junior Ice Hockey Championships - Division III tournament and gained promotion to Division II of the 2011 tournament.

== International competitions ==
=== World Junior Championships ===
- 1983 – 4th in Pool C (20th overall)
- 1984 – 7th in Pool C (23rd overall)
- 1985 – Did not participate
- 1986 – Did not participate
- 1987 – 6th in Pool C (22nd overall)
- 1988–1999 – Did not participate
- 2000 – 7th in Pool D (33rd overall)
- 2001 – 8th in Division III (34th overall)
- 2002 – Did not participate
- 2003 – 4th in Division III (38th overall)
- 2004 – 1st in Division III (35th overall)
- 2005 – 5th in Division II Group B (31st overall)
- 2006 – 5th in Division II Group A (31st overall)
- 2007 – 6th in Division II Group A (34th overall)
- 2008 – 4th in Division III (38th overall)
- 2009 – Division III tournament cancelled
- 2010 – 1st in Division III (35th overall)
- 2011 – 5th in Division II Group B (32nd overall)
- 2012 – 5th in Division II Group B (33rd overall)
- 2013 – 4th in Division II Group B (32nd overall)
- 2014 – 4th in Division II Group B (32nd overall)
- 2015 – 3rd in Division II Group B (31st overall)
- 2016 – 5th in Division II Group B (33rd overall)
- 2017 – 6th in Division II Group B (34th overall)
- 2018 – 5th in Division III (39th overall)
- 2019 – 2nd in Division III (36th overall)
- 2020 – 2nd in Division III (36th overall)
- 2021 – Cancelled due to COVID-19 pandemic
- 2022 – 3rd in Division III (37th overall)
- 2023 – 1st in Division III (35th overall)
- 2024 – 4th in Division IIB (32nd overall)
- 2025 – 4th in Division IIB (32nd overall)
- 2026 – 2nd in Division IIB (30th overall)
