= 1983 World Junior Ice Hockey Championships =

1983 edition of the World Junior Ice Hockey Championships

1983 IIHF World U20 Championship

Tournament details
- Host country: Soviet Union
- Venue: 1 (in 1 host city)
- Dates: December 26, 1982 – January 4, 1983
- Teams: 8

Final positions
- Champions: Soviet Union (5th title)
- Runners-up: Czechoslovakia
- Third place: Canada
- Fourth place: Sweden

Tournament statistics
- Games played: 28
- Goals scored: 257 (9.18 per game)
- Scoring leader: (Czechoslovakia) Vladimír Růžička (20 points)

The 1983 World Junior Ice Hockey Championships (1983 WJHC) was the seventh edition of the Ice Hockey World Junior Championship and was held in Leningrad, Soviet Union between December 26, 1982, and January 4, 1983. The host Soviet team won the tournament with a perfect 7–0 record.

== Pool A ==
The tournament was a round-robin format, with the top three teams winning gold, silver and bronze medals respectively.

=== Final standings ===
Pos	Team	Pld	W	L	D	GF	GA	GD	Pts
1	Soviet Union	7	7	0	0	50	15	+35	14
2	Czechoslovakia	7	5	1	1	43	22	+21	11
3	Canada	7	4	2	1	39	24	+15	9
4	Sweden	7	4	3	0	35	23	+12	8
5	United States	7	3	4	0	28	29	−1	6
6	Finland	7	3	4	0	35	29	+6	6
7	West Germany	7	1	6	0	14	46	−32	2
8	Norway	7	0	7	0	13	69	−56	0

Source: Hockey Canada

Norway was relegated to Pool B for the 1984 World Junior Ice Hockey Championships.

=== Results ===
December 26, 1982	Canada	4 – 0 (0–0, 3–0, 1–0)	West Germany	Leningrad

December 26, 1982	Soviet Union	10 – 1 (4–0, 3–1, 3–0)	Norway	Leningrad

December 26, 1982	Sweden	4 – 6 (0–0, 2–2, 2-4)	Finland	Leningrad

December 26, 1982	Czechoslovakia	6 – 4 (3–0, 3–1, 0–3)	United States	Leningrad

December 27, 1982	Canada	4 – 2 (2–2, 1–0, 1–0)	United States	Leningrad

December 27, 1982	Soviet Union	4 – 3 (1–0, 2–2, 1–1)	Czechoslovakia	Leningrad

December 27, 1982	Sweden	4 – 3	West Germany	Leningrad

December 27, 1982	Finland	10 – 2 (3–0, 3–0, 4–2)	Norway	Leningrad

December 29, 1982	Canada	6 – 3 (3–1, 1–1, 2–1)	Finland	Leningrad

December 29, 1982	Soviet Union	12 – 2	West Germany	Leningrad

December 29, 1982	Czechoslovakia	9 – 2 (3–2, 2–0, 4–0)	Norway	Leningrad

December 29, 1982	United States	1 – 4 (0–0, 0–1, 1–3)	Sweden	Leningrad

December 30, 1982	Soviet Union	7 – 3 (3–0, 3–1, 1–2	Canada	Leningrad

December 30, 1982	Czechoslovakia	4 – 2 (1–0, 2–1, 1–1)	Sweden	Leningrad

December 30, 1982	West Germany	4 – 2 (1-0, 1–0, 2–2)	Norway	Leningrad

December 30, 1982	Finland	2 – 4 (0–2, 0–1, 1–2)	United States	Leningrad

January 1, 1983	Czechoslovakia	7 – 7 (1–1, 6–5, 0–1)	Canada	Leningrad

January 1, 1983	Finland	9 – 1 (1–0, 5–1, 3–0)	West Germany	Leningrad

January 1, 1983	Sweden	15 – 3 (1–1, 6–2, 8–0)	Norway	Leningrad

January 1, 1983	Soviet Union	5 – 3 (1–0, 2–1, 2–2)	United States	Leningrad

January 2, 1983	Sweden	5 – 2 (3–0, 1–1, 1–1)	Canada	Leningrad

January 2, 1983	Soviet Union	7 – 2 (0–1, 3–1, 4–0)	Finland	Leningrad

January 2, 1983	Czechoslovakia	9 – 0 (2–0, 6–0, 1–0)	West Germany	Leningrad

January 2, 1983	United States	8 – 3 (3–2, 3–0, 2–1)	Norway	Leningrad

January 4, 1983	Canada	13 – 0 (5–0, 6–0, 2–0)	Norway	Leningrad

January 4, 1983	Soviet Union	5 – 1 (1–1, 2–0, 2–0)	Sweden	Leningrad

January 4, 1983	Czechoslovakia	5 – 3 (2–1, 2–0, 1–2)	Finland	Leningrad

January 4, 1983	United States	6 – 5 (1–3, 1–2, 4–0)	West Germany	Leningrad

=== Scoring leaders ===
Rank	Player	Country	G	A	Pts
1	Vladimír Růžička	Czechoslovakia	12	8	20
2	Herman Volgin	Soviet Union	11	3	14
3	Tomas Sandström	Sweden	9	3	12
4	Oleg Starkov	Soviet Union	6	6	12
5	Dave Andreychuk	Canada	6	5	11
6	Sergei Kharin	Soviet Union	8	2	10
7	Jali Wahlsten	Finland	7	3	10
8	Mario Lemieux	Canada	5	5	10
9	Leonid Trukhno	Soviet Union	4	6	10
10	Petr Klima	Czechoslovakia	4	4	8

=== Tournament awards ===
	IIHF Directorate Awards	Media All-Star Team
Goaltender	(Czechoslovakia) Dominik Hašek	(Finland) Matti Rautianen
Defencemen	(Soviet Union) Ilya Byakin	(Soviet Union) Ilya Byakin (Finland) Simo Saarinen
Forwards	(Sweden) Tomas Sandström	(Czechoslovakia) Vladimír Růžička (Sweden) Tomas Sandström (Soviet Union) Herman Volgin

== Pool B ==
The second tier was contested from March 14 to 20, in Anglet, France. Eight teams were divided into two round robin groups where the top two, and bottom two, graduated to meet their respective opponents in a final round robin. Results between competitors who migrated together were carried forward.

=== Preliminary round ===
==== Group A ====
Team	Pld	W	L	D	GF	GA	GD	Pts
Japan	3	2	1	0	22	10	+12	4
Austria	3	2	1	0	18	13	+5	4
Netherlands	3	2	1	0	20	18	+2	4
Italy	3	0	3	0	11	30	−19	0

Austria	8 – 4 (3–1, 4–0, 1–3)	Netherlands	Anglet

Japan	12 – 2 (2–0, 6–1, 4–1)	Italy	Anglet

Japan	4 – 5 (2–4, 0–1, 2–0)	Netherlands	Anglet

Italy	3 – 7 (2–3, 1–2, 0–2)	Austria	Anglet

Austria	3 – 6 (2–3, 0–1, 1–2)	Japan	Anglet

Netherlands	11 – 6 (5–1, 6–3, 0–2)	Italy	Anglet

==== Group B ====
Team	Pld	W	L	D	GF	GA	GD	Pts
Switzerland	3	3	0	0	22	8	+14	6
Poland	3	2	1	0	18	11	+7	4
France	3	1	2	0	19	15	+4	2
Denmark	3	0	3	0	6	31	−25	0

Switzerland	6 – 2 (3–1, 0–1, 3–0)	Poland	Anglet

France	11 – 3 (4–2, 3–1, 4–0)	Denmark	Anglet

Denmark	2 – 10 (1–2, 0–2, 1-6)	Poland	Anglet

France	5 – 6 (1–2, 3–1, 1–3)	Switzerland	Anglet

Switzerland	10 – 1 (1–0, 4–0, 5–1)	Denmark	Anglet

France	3 – 6 (0–1, 0–4, 3–1)	Poland	Anglet

=== Relegation round ===
Results from any games played during the preliminary round were carried forward to the relegation round.

Team	Pld	W	L	D	GF	GA	GD	Pts
France	3	2	0	1	24	9	+15	5
Netherlands	3	1	1	1	20	22	−2	3
Denmark	3	1	1	1	14	21	−7	3
Italy	3	0	2	1	13	19	−6	1

Italy was relegated to Pool C for the 1984 World Junior Ice Hockey Championships.

Netherlands	6 – 6	Denmark	Anglet

France	3 – 3	Italy	Anglet

Denmark	5 – 4 (2–0, 1–1, 2–3)	Italy	Anglet

France	10 – 3 (2–2, 8–1, 0–0)	Netherlands	Anglet

=== Promotion round ===
Results from any games played during the preliminary round were carried forward to the promotion round.

Team	Pld	W	L	D	GF	GA	GD	Pts
Switzerland	3	2	1	0	13	8	+5	4
Japan	3	2	1	0	13	9	+4	4
Poland	3	2	1	0	13	12	+1	4
Austria	3	0	3	0	8	18	−10	0

Switzerland was promoted to Pool A for the 1984 World Junior Ice Hockey Championships.

Japan	3 – 5 (0–2, 1–1, 2–2)	Poland	Anglet

Switzerland	6 – 2 (1–2, 3–0, 2–0)	Austria	Anglet

Poland	6 – 3	Austria	Anglet

Switzerland	1 – 4 (1–2, 0–1, 0–1)	Japan	Anglet

=== Scoring leaders ===
Rank	Player	Country	G	A	Pts
1	Christophe Ville	France	7	4	11
2	Franck Ganis	France	5	5	10
3	Marian Guzy	Poland	8	1	9

== Pool C ==
A double round robin (each team played each other twice) was played in Bucharest, Romania from March 3 to 9. This was the first year of a 'C' pool, and it marked the debut of junior teams from Romania, Bulgaria, and Australia.

Team	Pld	W	L	D	GF	GA	GD	Pts
Romania	6	6	0	0	49	9	+40	12
Bulgaria	6	3	3	0	16	19	−3	6
Hungary	6	3	3	0	21	30	−9	6
Australia	6	0	6	0	12	40	−28	0

Romania was promoted to Pool B for the 1984 World Junior Ice Hockey Championships.

Hungary	3 – 1 (1–1, 2–0, 0–0)	Bulgaria	Bucharest

Romania	10 – 2 (3–0, 4–1, 3–1)	Australia	Bucharest

Australia	1 – 3	Bulgaria	Bucharest

Romania	9 – 3 (3–0, 3–0, 3–3)	Hungary	Bucharest

Hungary	7 – 5 (1–2, 1–1, 5–2)	Australia	Bucharest

Romania	4 – 1 (0–0, 1–0, 3–1)	Bulgaria	Bucharest

Bulgaria	4 – 2 (3-1, 1–1, 0–0)	Hungary	Bucharest

Romania	10 – 1	Australia	Bucharest

Bulgaria	4 – 0 (1–0, 2–0, 1–0)	Australia	Bucharest

Romania	8 – 0 (4–0, 1–0, 3–0)	Hungary	Bucharest

Australia	3 – 6 (1–3, 1–0, 1–3)	Hungary	Bucharest

Romania	8 – 2 (5–0, 2–2, 1–0)	Bulgaria	Bucharest
