= Czechoslovakia men's national junior ice hockey team =

Czechoslovakia
- Most points: Robert Reichel (40)
- IIHF code: TCH
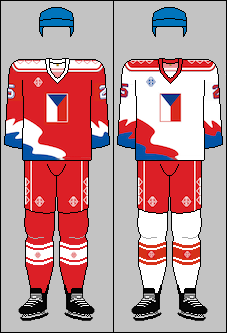

First international
- Czechoslovakia 6 - 4 Sweden (Leningrad, Soviet Union; December 27, 1973); Last international Czechoslovakia 7 - 4 Canada (Gävle, Sweden; January 4, 1993)

Biggest win
- Czechoslovakia 21- 4 Austria (Füssen, Germany; December 28, 1980)

Biggest defeat
- Soviet Union 9 - 1 Czechoslovakia (Karlstad, Sweden; December 30, 1978)

IIHF World U20 Championship
- Appearances: 20 (first in 1974)
- Best result: Silver: 5 – (1979, 1982, 1983, 1985, 1987)

International record (W–L–T)
- 69-43-14

Medal record

IIHF World Junior Championship
Silver medal – second place	1979 Sweden	
Silver medal – second place	1982 USA	
Silver medal – second place	1983 Soviet Union	
Silver medal – second place	1985 Finland	
Silver medal – second place	1987 Czechoslovakia	
Bronze medal – third place	1976 Finland	
Bronze medal – third place	1977 Czechoslovakia	
Bronze medal – third place	1984 Sweden	
Bronze medal – third place	1989 USA	
Bronze medal – third place	1990 Finland	
Bronze medal – third place	1991 Canada	
Bronze medal – third place	1993 Sweden	

The Czechoslovakia men's national under 20 ice hockey team was the national under-20 ice hockey team in Czechoslovakia. The team represented Czechoslovakia at the International Ice Hockey Federation's IIHF World Junior Championship. After the split in Czechoslovakia, the Czech Republic took the lead in the main series and Slovakia had to start the C-League qualifiers.
