= Robert Rooba =

Estonian ice hockey player (born 1993)

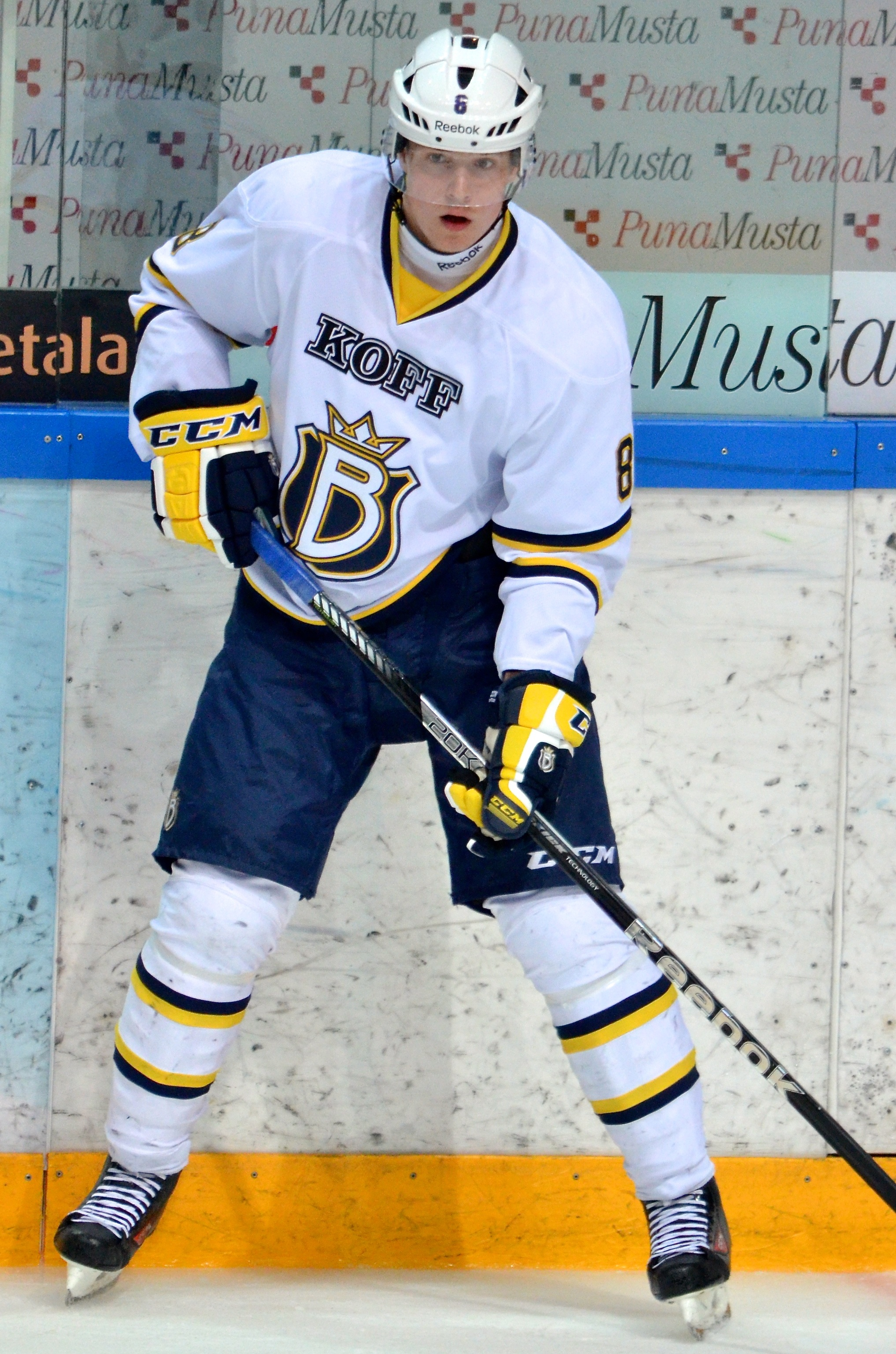
- Rooba with Blues in 2013
- Born: 2 September 1993 (age 33) Tallinn, Estonia
- Height: 1.91 m (6 ft 3 in)
- Weight: 95 kg (209 lb; 14 st 13 lb)
- Position: Left wing
- Shoots: Left
- Liiga team Former teams: KooKoo; Blues; Hermes; JYP; Severstal Cherepovets
- National team: Estonia
- Playing career: 2011–present

Robert Rooba (born 2 September 1993) is an Estonian professional ice hockey left winger who currently plays for KooKoo of the Finnish Liiga.

Internationally, Rooba has represented Estonia on numerous occasions.

== Playing career ==
=== 2000s ===
Raised by HC Purikad, Rooba played his first men's games in the 2007–2008 season in the Estonian League with his junior club and the U20 national team at just 14 years old. At 17, he moved to Espoo with his father Jüri Rooba and joined the Espoo Blues' C-juniors for the 2008–09 season. While living in Finland, Rooba was a distance learning student at Rocca al Mare School^{[ee]} in Tallinn, taking exams every couple of weeks. He was enticed to join the Blues by Hannu Järvenpää, who was the head coach of the Estonian U18 national team at the time. Järvenpää initially invited Rooba to practice with Kiekko-Espoo before he was promoted directly to the higher level with the Blues.

=== 2010s ===
During the 2010–2011 season, Rooba won a silver medal in the A-juniors' SM-liiga and a Finnish championship in the B-juniors. Rooba began the 2011–12 season with the Blues' A-juniors. He made his SM-liiga debut on January 5, 2012, in a home game against Lukko. Rooba started on the fourth line and ultimately played 1 minute and 50 seconds in the game. This was Rooba's only SM-liiga game of the season.

In July 2012, the undrafted Rooba attended the Detroit Red Wings' development camp. For the 2012–13 season, he signed a 1+1-year contract with the Blues. He played in two SM-liiga games that season. Rooba also played three games on loan with the Mestis team KooKoo in January 2013. However, he spent most of his season with the Blues' A-juniors, who won the SM-liiga silver medal. In April 2013, Rooba signed a 1+1-year extension with the Blues.

Rooba scored his first SM-liiga goal on the opening day of the 2013–14 season on September 12, 2013, against TPS. He was named the second star of the game by Ilta-Sanomat. Rooba became the second Estonian goal scorer in SM-liiga history, after his role model Toivo Suursoo. In total, Rooba scored 1+3=4 points in 36 regular-season games and one playoff game that season. In April 2014, he signed a one-year extension with the team. In December of the same year, Rooba signed another 1+1-year extension with the team.

During the 2015–16 season, Rooba went pointless in 30 regular-season games and eight CHL games. In January 2016, he left the financially struggling Blues and joined the Mestis team Hermes for the remainder of the season. In the playoffs, Rooba was the team's top goal scorer with three goals, alongside Jussi Nättinen and Niklas Appelgren.

For the 2016–17 season, Rooba moved to JYP on a 2+1-year contract. He also spent a significant part of the season with the Mestis team JYP-Akatemia. In December 2016, Rooba was sidelined for about two months after suffering a concussion from a hit to the head by Lasse Uusivirta^{[fi]} of Kiekko-Vantaa. After his recovery, Rooba secured a spot in JYP's SM-liiga lineup for the rest of the season, winning a bronze medal at the end of the season. At the beginning of the season, he said he hadn't yet found his playing identity. He set a goal for himself to find it and build the rest of his game around it. Rooba decided to develop his goal-scoring skills and began training with the goal of becoming a versatile scorer.

After the season, he trained with track and field athletes in Tallinn during the summer.

Rooba had a strong start to the 2017–18 season; he was ranked first on the Liiga's traditional "Viikon tulikuumat" (Hot of the Week) list after the first round. After two rounds, he led the entire SM-liiga in points. Rooba finished the SM-liiga regular season with 11 goals and 5 assists for 16 points. In February 2018, he became the first Estonian to win the Champions Hockey League when JYP defeated Växjö Lakers HC 2–0 in the final. In March 2018, JYP exercised the option in Rooba's contract and signed him to a one-year extension. In November, Rooba's contract was extended for two more years until the spring of 2021.

In the 2018–19 season, Rooba set a new personal career high for goals and points in the SM-liiga with 17 goals and 8 assists for 25 points. Rooba was JYP's top goal scorer. He broke the all-time SM-liiga single-season point record for an Estonian player and tied the single-season goal record set by Toivo Suursoo in the 1997–98 season, who had 17 goals and 5 assists for 22 points. In the Champions Hockey League, Rooba tied for the team lead in plus-minus with Jerry Turkulainen at +3.

In the 2019–20 season, Rooba broke his personal single-season plus-minus and assist records. His plus-minus rating was +8 after 51 games, and he recorded 13 assists during the season.

=== 2020s ===
In the 2020–21 season, Rooba received more responsibility at JYP and felt that he had developed as a player. In February 2021, Rooba stated that he had never reached his personal goal for single-season goals. During the season, he said he was living his dream as a hockey player and that his success was a big deal because he was specifically an Estonian hockey player. Rooba eventually surprisingly rose to the SM-liiga elite, scoring 30 goals and 11 assists for 41 points in 59 regular-season games. This broke his own Estonian single-season point record and tied the goal record he shared with Toivo Suursoo. This had previously been his goal. Rooba finished second in the entire SM-liiga goal-scoring race, behind only Sebastian Wännström of Ässät. Rooba also won JYP's internal scoring title. During the season, he also wore the Golden Helmet for the first time. At the end of the season, he had collected 27 Golden Helmets, ranking 11th on the list and as JYP's top player.

In March 2021, Rooba signed a two-year extension with JYP. However, in May, he signed a one-year contract with the KHL club Severstal Cherepovets, becoming the first Estonian player in KHL history. Less than five minutes into the season opener, Rooba, playing as assistant captain, scored the first-ever goal by an Estonian player in the KHL. He played 39 regular-season games with 5 goals and 2 assists for 7 points during the 2021–22 season, but he left the team after the regular season following Russia's invasion of Ukraine in February 2022.

For the 2022–23 season, Rooba returned to JYP on a two-year contract. He was named the team's captain, becoming the first Estonian captain in SM-liiga history. In the 2023–24 season, his role on the team became more defensive, and by early November, he had scored two goals. This shift in playstyle, which emphasized defense, had already begun the previous season, but the change did not mean his importance to the team had diminished. In January 2024, he voluntarily stepped down as JYP's captain, stating that he did not feel he was the right player for the role at the time. He was replaced by Teemu Eronen. In late February 2024, Rooba told the online magazine Jatkoaika.com that his season had been difficult on a personal level and that his confidence had suffered, which also contributed to his decision to step down as captain. At that point, he had only scored 3 goals and 5 assists for 8 points in the regular season. In the interview, he also announced that he would be leaving JYP after the season. In March, the club confirmed that Rooba would not be continuing with the team.

For the 2024–25 season, Rooba moved to KooKoo on a one-year contract. He broke his personal SM-liiga single-season assist record, providing 19 assists in 58 regular-season games. In terms of goals scored, it was Rooba's second-best season in the SM-liiga, as he scored 18 goals. Therefore, the season was his second-best in the SM-liiga in terms of total points (37). He tied with Radek Koblížek for the team lead in goals and finished second in the internal scoring race, tied with Vilmos Galló and David Farrance, behind Koblížek. In January 2025, Rooba signed a one-year contract extension with the club.

== International play ==
=== World Championships ===
Rooba played in the Division II World Championships in 2010, and in the Division II A World Championships in 2012 and 2014. Rooba represented the Estonian national team in the Division I B World Championships in 2011, 2013, 2015, 2016, 2017, *2018, 2019**, 2022, and 2024. The tournaments in 2018 and 2024 both resulted in bronze medals.

The 2012 tournament ended with a gold medal and promotion to Division I B. In the 2013 tournament, Rooba was named to the Estonian captaincy, but the team was relegated to Division II A. In the 2014 tournament, he won the scoring and assist titles with 6 goals and 8 assists for 14 points. Rooba was named the best forward of the tournament and Estonia's best player. The tournament ended with a gold medal and another promotion to Division I B for the following year. In the 2016 tournament, Rooba served as the alternate captain for Estonia and tied for the tournament scoring title with Great Britain's Ben O'Connor (4 goals, 4 assists for 8 points) and for the goal-scoring title with Croatia's Mike Glumac. He was also selected as his team's best player.

In the 2017 tournament, Rooba was Estonia's top point and goal scorer with 4 goals and 3 assists for 7 points. In the 2018 tournament, he served as the team's alternate captain. He was fifth in the tournament's goal-scoring list, despite playing one less game than the others. Rooba scored one game-winning goal and two opening goals in the tournament—all three goals were scored within the first 5 minutes of play. The team fought for promotion to Division I A until the final game but lost to host nation Lithuania, finishing third in Group A. This was Estonia's best placement under the current league system, which has been in place since 2012.

In the 2018 tournament, Rooba tied with Riho Embrich^{[fi]}for the team's top goal scorer with three goals. In the 2022 tournament, he served as the captain of Estonia. Rooba was the team's top scorer and goal scorer with four goals. In 2024, he was the second-best goal scorer of the tournament, scoring five goals in five games. Rooba was also selected as the best forward of the tournament.

=== Olympics ===
Rooba also played in the qualifiers for the 2018 Pyeongchang Winter Olympics, where he rose to the top of the all-time Olympic qualifying goal-scoring list. Rooba also tied the point record of Hungary's Balázs Ladányi, but Ladányi needed 12 games to reach his record points, which included three pre-qualifying tournaments and one preliminary qualifying tournament. Rooba, on the other hand, scored 24 of his points in the preliminary qualifying round in only three games, where Estonia defeated Israel 19–1, Bulgaria 26–0, and Mexico 13–3. In the pre-qualifying round, however, the team only managed to defeat Lithuania, 4–1, and thus Estonia did not advance to the final tournament. In the pre-qualifiers, Rooba tied for the team lead in points with Andrei Makrov and Aleksandr Petrov^{[fi]}, with 1 goal and 3 assists for 4 points. He also played in the qualifiers for the 2026 Milan Winter Olympics.

== Playing style ==
Rooba has been characterized as a power forward. In addition, he has been described as a straightforward and conscientious player who developed into a goal scorer while playing for JYP. With his point totals, Rooba is the most productive Estonian player of all time in the SM-liiga, and he was also the first Estonian player in the KHL.

== Other ==
Rooba's father, Jüri Rooba, is a former Estonian top-tier hockey player who now serves as the General Manager for the Estonian national team. Rooba has said that he draws a positive attitude toward playing by living one day at a time and living in the moment. He has stated that he has set high goals for his career. One of Rooba's role models is the Estonian hockey player Toivo Suursoo, with whom Rooba got to play in one World Championship tournament at the beginning of his career, which Rooba considered very significant.

== Career statistics ==
=== Regular season and playoffs ===
			Regular season					Playoffs
Season	Team	League	GP	G	A	Pts	PIM	GP	G	A	Pts	PIM
2007–08	HC Purikad	EST	9	1	4	5	2	—	—	—	—	—
2007–08	Estonia Jr. Team	EST	5	3	1	4	0	—	—	—	—	—
2008–09	Estonia Jr. Team	EST	4	1	0	1	0	—	—	—	—	—
2009–10	Blues	FIN U18	23	8	13	21	24	10	3	6	9	6
2010–11	Blues	FIN U18	6	2	5	7	20	4	2	6	8	2
2010–11	Blues	FIN U20	34	7	7	14	30	12	1	0	1	2
2011–12	Blues	FIN U20	39	14	16	30	24	4	2	0	2	4
2011–12	Blues	SM-l	1	0	0	0	0	—	—	—	—	—
2012–13	Blues	FIN U20	38	15	8	23	26	12	5	5	10	8
2012–13	Blues	SM-l	2	0	0	0	2	—	—	—	—	—
2012–13	KooKoo	Mestis	3	0	0	0	0	—	—	—	—	—
2013–14	Blues	FIN U20	3	0	2	2	0	1	0	0	0	0
2013–14	Blues	Liiga	36	1	3	4	8	1	0	0	0	0
2013–14	Kiekko-Vantaa	Mestis	4	3	0	3	2	—	—	—	—	—
2014–15	Blues	Liiga	48	5	3	8	6	4	0	0	0	0
2014–15	Kiekko-Vantaa	Mestis	1	2	0	2	2	—	—	—	—	—
2015–16	Blues	Liiga	30	0	0	0	4	—	—	—	—	—
2015–16	Hermes	Mestis	16	5	3	8	6	7	3	3	6	8
2016–17	JYP	Liiga	20	3	2	5	10	6	0	2	2	0
2016–17	JYP-Akatemia	Mestis	12	3	1	4	2	—	—	—	—	—
2017–18	JYP	Liiga	59	11	5	16	8	4	0	1	1	2
2018–19	JYP	Liiga	55	17	8	25	18	3	0	0	0	2
2019–20	JYP	Liiga	51	11	13	24	20	—	—	—	—	—
2020–21	JYP	Liiga	59	30	11	41	54	—	—	—	—	—
2021–22	Severstal Cherepovets	KHL	39	5	2	7	8	—	—	—	—	—
2022–23	JYP	Liiga	59	11	12	23	24	—	—	—	—	—
2023–24	JYP	Liiga	56	4	7	11	26	—	—	—	—	—
2024–25	KooKoo	Liiga	58	18	19	37	10	4	0	2	2	0
2025–26	KooKoo	Liiga	59	15	24	39	20	18	3	4	7	4
Liiga totals			593	126	107	233	210	40	3	9	12	8
KHL totals			39	5	2	7	8	—	—	—	—	—

=== International ===
Year	Team	Event	Result	GP	G	A	Pts	PIM
2009	Estonia	WJC18-D2	26th	5	3	4	7	2
2009	Estonia	WJC-D1	22nd	5	0	1	1	6
2010	Estonia	WJC18-D2	31st	1	2	1	3	0
2010	Estonia	WJC-D2	31st	5	3	0	3	16
2010	Estonia	WC-D2	29th	5	3	2	5	0
2011	Estonia	WJC-D2	31st	5	4	6	10	2
2011	Estonia	WC-D1	27th	5	0	0	0	4
2012	Estonia	WJC-D2	30th	5	13	6	19	0
2012	Estonia	WC-D2	29th	5	3	5	8	6
2013	Estonia	WJC-D2	29th	5	7	14	21	4
2013	Estonia	WC-D1	28th	5	1	3	4	0
2014	Estonia	WC-D2	29th	5	6	8	14	2
2015	Estonia	WC-D1	27th	5	1	3	4	0
2016	Estonia	OGQ	NQ	6	12	16	28	2
2016	Estonia	WC-D1	27th	5	4	4	8	0
2017	Estonia	WC-D1	26th	5	4	3	7	25
2018	Estonia	WC-D1	25th	4	3	0	3	2
2019	Estonia	WC-D1	26th	5	4	1	5	0
2022	Estonia	WC-D1	25th	4	4	0	4	0
2023	Estonia	WC-D1	26th	5	3	0	3	2
2024	Estonia	OGQ	NQ	3	0	2	2	0
2024	Estonia	WC-D1	25th	5	5	3	8	2
2025	Estonia	WC-D1	25th	5	1	6	7	0
Junior totals				31	32	32	64	30
Senior totals				77	54	56	110	45

== Awards and honours ==
Award	Year	Ref
CHL
Champion	2018	
