= Netherlands men's national junior ice hockey team =

Netherlands
- Nickname: Oranje (Orange)
- Association: Netherlands Ice Hockey Association
- General manager: (Netherlands) Theo van Gerwen
- Head coach: (Czech Republic) Bo Subr
- Assistants: (United States) Paul Vincent
- Captain: Reno de Hondt
- Most points: Bob Teunissen (31)
- Team colors
- IIHF code: NED

First international
- Switzerland 10 – 4 Netherlands (Caen, France; 5 March 1979)

Biggest win
- Netherlands 37 – 0 Turkey (Novi Sad, Yugoslavia; 29 December 1998)

Biggest defeat
- Denmark 16 – 2 Netherlands (Gheorgheni/Miercurea Ciuc, Romania; 31 December 1996

IIHF World U20 Championship
- Appearances: 47 (first in 1979)
- Best result: 10th (1985)

International record (W–L–T)
- 83–85–9

The Dutch men's national under 20 ice hockey team is the national under-20 ice hockey team in the Netherlands. The team represents the Netherlands at the International Ice Hockey Federation's IIHF World U20 Championship.

== International competitions ==
=== World Junior Championships ===
- 1979 – 14th overall (6th in Pool B)
- 1980 – 12th overall (4th in Pool B)
- 1981 – 12th overall (4th in Pool B)
- 1982 – 15th overall (7th in Pool B)
- 1983 – 14th overall (6th in Pool B)
- 1984 – 13th overall (5th in Pool B)
- 1985 – 10th overall (2nd in Pool B)
- 1986 – 14th overall (6th in Pool B)
- 1987 – 15th overall (7th in Pool B)
- 1988 – 15th overall (7th in Pool B)
- 1989 – 16th overall (8th in Pool B)
- 1990 – 17th overall (1st in Pool C)
- 1991 – 14th overall (6th in Pool B)
- 1992 – 14th overall (6th in Pool B)
- 1993 – 16th overall (8th in Pool B)
- 1994 – 22nd overall (6th in Pool C)
- 1995 – 23rd overall (7th in Pool C1)
- 1996 – 25th overall (7th in Pool C)
- 1997 – 26th overall (8th in Pool C)
- 1998 – 28th overall (2nd in Pool D)
- 1999 – 28th overall (2nd in Pool D)
- 2000 – 29th overall (3rd in Pool D)
- 2001 – 27th overall (1st in Division III)
- 2002 – 25th overall (7th in Division II)
- 2003 – 26th overall (2nd in Division II, Group B)
- 2004 – 27th overall (3rd in Division II, Group A)
- 2005 – 27th overall (3rd in Division II, Group A)
- 2006 – 25th overall (2nd in Division II, Group A)
- 2007 – 25th overall (2nd in Division II, Group B)
- 2008 – 25th overall (2nd in Division II Group B)
- 2009 – 28th overall (3rd in Division II Group B)
- 2010 – 26th overall (2nd in Division II Group B)
- 2011 – 26th overall (2nd in Division II Group A)
- 2012 – 27th overall (5th in Division IIA)
- 2013 – 26th overall (4th in Division IIA)
- 2014 – 25th overall (3rd in Division IIA)
- 2015 – 26th overall (4th in Division IIA)
- 2016 – 27th overall (5th in Division IIA)
- 2017 – 27th overall (5th in Division IIA)
- 2018 – 28th overall (6th in Division IIA)
- 2019 – 31st overall (3rd in Division IIB)
- 2020 – 30th overall (2nd in Division IIB)
- 2021 –Cancelled due to the COVID-19 pandemic
- 2022 – 30th overall (2nd in Division IIB)
- 2023 – 27th overall (5th in Division IIA)
- 2024 – 27th overall (5th in Division IIA)
- 2025 – 28th overall (6th in Division IIA)
- 2026 – 29th overall (1st in Division IIB)
