= Spain men's national junior ice hockey team =

National men's U20 ice hockey team

Spain
- The coat of arms of Spain is the badge used on players' jerseys.
- Association: Federación Española de Deportes de Hielo
- Head coach: (Spain) Carlos Gordovil
- Assistants: (Spain) Koldo Saenz
- Captain: Pablo Puyuelo
- Most points: Juan Munoz (33)
- Team colors
- IIHF code: ESP

First international
- Spain 7 – 3 Great Britain (Varese, Italy; 25 March 1984)

Biggest win
- Spain 13 – 1 Mexico (Sofia, Bulgaria; 30 December 1996)

Biggest defeat
- Denmark 19 – 0 Spain (Belluno & Feltre, Italy; 21 March 1988)

IIHF World U20 Championship
- Appearances: 38 (first in 1984)
- Best result: 20th (1984, 1992)

International record (W–L–T)
- 47–72–6

The Spain men's national junior ice hockey team (Spanish: Selección Española de Hockey Hielo U20 masculina) is the national men's junior under-20 ice hockey team of Spain. The team is controlled by the Federación Española de Deportes de Hielo, a member of the International Ice Hockey Federation.

== History ==
Spain played its first game in 1984 against Great Britain during the Pool C tournament of the 1984 IIHF World U20 Championship. Spain won the game 7–3 and finished the tournament in fourth place. After competing in their second World U20 Championships in 1985 Spain did not send a team for the 1986 IIHF World U20 Championship. Spain returned to compete in the Pool C tournament at the 1987 IIHF World U20 Championship. During the 1988 tournament Spain had their largest defeat in international participation after being beaten by Denmark 0–19. Spain did not send a team to the following three World U20 Championship and but returned to the Pool C tournament for the 1992 IIHF World U20 Championship. They continued to compete in the Pool C tournament until 1996 when their finished last in the Pool and were relegated to Pool D for the following years World Championships. During the Pool D tournament of the 1997 IIHF World U20 Championship Spain achieved their largest win in international participation when they defeated Mexico 13–1. Spain continued to compete in Pool D until 2001 when the International Ice Hockey Federation changed the format of the World U20 Championship and Spain was reseeded into the Division III tournament. In 2002 Spain was promoted to Division II following the 2002 Division III tournament due to a restructuring which saw all Division III teams promoted to Division II. Spain has continued to compete in Division II and in 2013 finished sixth in the Division II Group A tournament being held in Brașov, Romania. Following their sixth-place finish they were relegated to Division II Group B for the following year.

Juan Munoz currently holds the team record for most points with 33. Munoz competed in four IIHF World U20 Championship from 2007 to 2010 with his best result in 2010 where he scored 11 goals and six assists in the Division II Group A tournament at the 2010 IIHF World U20 Championship.

== International competitions ==
- 1984 – 20th overall (4th in Pool C)
- 1985 – 21st overall (6th in Pool C)
- 1986 – Did not participate
- 1987 – 21st overall (5th in Pool C)
- 1988 – 21st overall (5th in Pool C)
- 1989–1991 – Did not participate
- 1992 – 20th overall (4th in Pool C)
- 1993 – 23rd overall (7th in Pool C)
- 1994 – 23rd overall (7th in Pool C)
- 1995 – 21st overall (5th in Pool C1)
- 1996 – 26th overall (8th in Pool C)
- 1997 – 30th overall (4th in Pool D)
- 1998 – 30th overall (4th in Pool D)
- 1999 – 30th overall (4th in Pool D)
- 2000 – 30th overall (4th in Pool D)
- 2001 – 28th overall (2nd in Division III)
- 2002 – 28th overall (2nd in Division III)
- 2003 – 30th overall (4th in Division II, Group B)
- 2004 – 28th overall (4th in Division II, Group A)
- 2005 – 30th overall (4th in Division II, Group B)
- 2006 – 30th overall (4th in Division II, Group A)
- 2007 – 29th overall (4th in Division II, Group A)
- 2008 – 29th overall (4th in Division II, Group B)
- 2009 – 31st overall (5th in Division II, Group B)
- 2010 – 27th overall (2nd in Division II, Group A)
- 2011 – 28th overall (3rd in Division II, Group A)
- 2012 – 26th overall (4th in Division IIA)
- 2013 – 28th overall (6th in Division IIA)
- 2014 – 30th overall (2nd in Division IIB)
- 2015 – 30th overall (2nd in Division IIB)
- 2016 – 30th overall (2nd in Division IIB)
- 2017 – 30th overall (2nd in Division IIB)
- 2018 – 29th overall (1st in Division IIB)
- 2019 – 27th overall (5th in Division IIA)
- 2020 – 27th overall (5th in Division IIA)
- 2021 – Cancelled due to the COVID-19 pandemic
- 2022 – 26th overall (4th in Division IIA)
- 2023 – 26th overall (4th in Division IIA)
- 2024 – 28th overall (6th in Division IIA)
- 2025 – 29th overall (1st in Division IIB)
- 2026 – 28th overall (6th in Division IIA)
