= 1984 World Junior Ice Hockey Championships =

1984 IIHF World U20 Championship
Tournament details
- Host country: Sweden
- Venues: 2 (in 2 host cities)
- Dates: December 25, 1983 – January 3, 1984
- Teams: 8

Final positions
- Champions: Soviet Union (6th title)
- Runners-up: Finland
- Third place: Czechoslovakia
- Fourth place: Canada

Tournament statistics
- Games played: 28
- Goals scored: 271 (9.68 per game)
- Attendance: 32,384 (1,157 per game)
- Scoring leader: (Finland) Raimo Helminen (24 points)

The 1984 World Junior Ice Hockey Championships (1984 WJHC) was the eighth edition of the Ice Hockey World Junior Championship. It was held from December 25, 1983, to January 3, 1984, in Norrköping and Nyköping, Sweden. The Soviet Union won its second consecutive gold medal and sixth overall. Finland won silver and Czechoslovakia bronze.

== Pool A ==
The 1984 tournament was a round-robin format, with the top three teams winning gold, silver and bronze medals respectively.

=== Final standings ===
Pos	Team	Pld	W	L	D	GF	GA	GD	Pts
1	Soviet Union	7	6	0	1	50	17	+33	13
2	Finland	7	6	1	0	44	21	+23	12
3	Czechoslovakia	7	5	2	0	51	24	+27	10
4	Canada	7	4	2	1	39	17	+22	9
5	Sweden	7	3	4	0	27	28	−1	6
6	United States	7	2	5	0	32	38	−6	4
7	West Germany	7	1	6	0	12	54	−42	2
8	Switzerland	7	0	7	0	16	72	−56	0

Switzerland was relegated to Pool B for the 1985 World Junior Ice Hockey Championships.

== Results ==
December 25, 1983	Canada	2 – 4 (1–3, 0–1, 1–0)	Finland	Nyköping

December 25, 1983	Switzerland	2 – 14 (1–7, 0–6, 1–1)	Soviet Union	Norrköping

December 25, 1983	Czechoslovakia	6 – 1 (1–1, 2–0, 3–0)	West Germany	Nyköping

December 25, 1983	Sweden	4 – 1 (0–0, 3–0, 1–1)	United States	Norrköping

December 26, 1983	United States	2 – 5 (0–3, 2–2, 0–0)	Canada	Nyköping

December 26, 1983	Sweden	5 – 2 (3–0, 0–0, 2–0)	Switzerland	Norrköping

December 26, 1983	West Germany	1 – 9 (0–3, 0–3, 1–3)	Soviet Union	Norrköping

December 26, 1983	Finland	8 – 7 (3–3, 4–2, 2–1)	Czechoslovakia	Norrköping

December 28, 1983	Canada	12 – 0 (1–0, 7–0, 4–0)	Switzerland	Norrköping

December 28, 1983	Soviet Union	3 – 1 (2–0, 0–0, 1–1)	Finland	Nyköping

December 28, 1983	Sweden	11 – 2 (7–1, 3–1, 1–0)	West Germany	Nyköping

December 28, 1983	Czechoslovakia	10 – 1 (4–0, 3–1, 3–0)	United States	Norrköping

December 29, 1983	West Germany	0 – 7 (0–1, 0–5, 0–1)	Canada	Nyköping

December 28, 1983	Czechoslovakia	13 – 2 (3–0, 2–1, 8–1)	Switzerland	Nyköping

December 29, 1983	Finland	4 – 1 (0–0, 1–1, 3–0)	Sweden	Norrköping

December 29, 1983	United States	4 – 7 (3–3, 1–1, 0–3)	Soviet Union	Norrköping

December 31, 1983	Canada	6 – 2 (0–1, 3–1, 3–0)	Sweden	Norrköping

December 31, 1983	Soviet Union	6 – 4 (5–0, 0–1, 1–3)	Czechoslovakia	Nyköping

December 31, 1983	Switzerland	3 – 4 (1–1, 1–1, 1–2)	West Germany	Norrköping

December 31, 1983	United States	2 – 7 (0–0, 2–3, 0–4)	Finland	Nyköping

January 2, 1984	Canada	3 – 3 (0–0, 3–1, 0–0)	Soviet Union	Norrköping

January 2, 1984	Switzerland	4 – 12 (3-4, 1–4, 0–4)	Finland	Nyköping

January 2, 1984	Sweden	2 – 5 (1–2, 0–0, 1–3)	Czechoslovakia	Nyköping

January 2, 1984	West Germany	2 – 10 (0–5, 2–5, 0–0)	United States	Norrköping

January 3, 1984	Czechoslovakia	6 – 4 (1–2, 1–1, 4–1)	Canada	Nyköping

January 3, 1984	Finland	8 – 2 (1–0, 5–0, 2–2)	West Germany	Nyköping

January 3, 1984	Soviet Union	8 – 2 (1–1, 4–0, 3–1)	Sweden	Norrköping

January 3, 1984	Switzerland	3 – 12 (1–2, 0–5, 2–5)	United States	Norrköping

=== Scoring leaders ===
Rank	Player	Country	G	A	Pts
1	Raimo Helminen	Finland	11	13	24
2	Petr Rosol	Czechoslovakia	10	5	15
3	Aleksandr Chernykh	Soviet Union	7	7	14
4	Vladimír Kameš	Czechoslovakia	8	5	13
5	Russ Courtnall	Canada	7	6	13
6	Nikolai Borschevsky	Soviet Union	6	7	13
7	Esa Tikkanen	Finland	8	4	12
8	Esa Keskinen	Finland	4	8	12
9	Libor Dolana	Czechoslovakia	7	4	11
10	Sergei Nemchinov	Soviet Union	5	6	11

=== Tournament awards ===
	IIHF Directorate Awards	Media All-Star Team
Goaltender	(United States) Allan Perry	(Soviet Union) Evgeny Belosheikin
Defencemen	(Soviet Union) Alexei Gusarov	(Soviet Union) Alexei Gusarov (Czechoslovakia) František Musil
Forwards	(Finland) Raimo Helminen	(Czechoslovakia) Petr Rosol (Finland) Raimo Helminen (Soviet Union) Nikolai Borschevsky

== Pool B ==
The second tier was contested from March 19–25, in Caen, France. Eight teams were divided into two round robin groups where the top two, and bottom two, graduated to meet their respective opponents in a final round robin. Results between competitors who migrated together were carried forward.

=== Preliminary round ===
==== Group A ====
Team	Pld	W	L	D	GF	GA	GD	Pts
Austria	3	3	0	0	15	10	+5	6
Norway	3	2	1	0	22	11	+11	4
France	3	1	2	0	19	17	+2	2
Romania	3	0	3	0	9	27	−18	0

Norway	11 – 2 (4–0, 3–0, 4–2)	Romania	Caen

France	4 – 5 (1–2, 3–2, 0–1)	Austria	Caen

Romania	2 – 4 (1–1, 1–0, 0–3)	Austria	Caen

France	3 – 7 (3–5, 0–2, 0–0)	Norway	Caen

Norway	4 – 6 (1–1, 0–3, 3–2)	Austria	Caen

France	12 – 5 (3–1, 5–2, 4–2)	Romania	Caen

==== Group B ====
Team	Pld	W	L	D	GF	GA	GD	Pts
Poland	3	2	0	1	20	12	+8	5
Japan	3	1	0	2	22	13	+9	4
Netherlands	3	1	1	1	13	15	−2	3
Denmark	3	0	3	0	4	19	−15	0

Poland	8 – 4 (4–0, 4–2, 0–2)	Netherlands	Caen

Japan	10 – 1 (2–1, 6–0, 2–0)	Denmark	Caen

Netherlands	6 – 6 (3–1, 1-4, 2–1)	Japan	Caen

Poland	6 – 2 (3-1, 1–1, 2–0)	Denmark	Caen

Denmark	1 – 3	Netherlands	Caen

Japan	6 – 6 (1–1, 4–3, 1–2)	Poland	Caen

=== Final Round ===
Promotion Group

Team	Pld	W	L	D	GF	GA	GD	Pts	Poland men's national junior ice hockey team	Austria men's national junior ice hockey team	Japan men's national junior ice hockey team	Norway men's national junior ice hockey team
Poland	3	2	0	1	15	12	+3	5		4–2	6–6	5–4
Austria	3	2	1	0	13	11	+2	4	2–4		5–3	6–4
Japan	3	1	1	1	14	14	0	3	6–6	3–5		5–3
Norway	3	0	3	0	11	16	−5	0	4–5	4–6	3–5	

Poland was promoted to Pool A for 1985.

Relegation Group

Team	Pld	W	L	D	GF	GA	GD	Pts	Netherlands men's national junior ice hockey team	France men's national junior ice hockey team	Romania men's national junior ice hockey team	Denmark men's national junior ice hockey team
Netherlands	3	3	0	0	12	6	+6	6		6–4	3–1	3–1
France	3	2	1	0	21	13	+8	4	4–6		12–5	5–2
Romania	3	1	2	0	11	18	−7	2	1–3	5–12		5–3
Denmark	3	0	3	0	6	13	−7	0	1–3	2–5	3–5	

Denmark was Demoted to Pool C for 1985.

== Pool C ==
This year, Pool C used the same format as Pool B. It was played in Varese Italy from March 25 to 31. Seven countries participated along with a second Italian team that received no official ranking. British and Spanish junior teams made their debut this year.

Group A

Team	Pld	W	L	D	GF	GA	GD	Pts	Hungary men's national junior ice hockey team	Bulgaria men's national junior ice hockey team	Belgium men's national junior ice hockey team	Italy
Hungary	3	2	0	1	19	6	+13	5		3–3	6–2	10–1
Bulgaria	3	2	0	1	13	6	+7	5	3–3		5–3	5–0
Belgium	3	1	2	0	9	13	−4	2	2–6	3–5		4–2
Italy B	3	0	3	0	3	19	−16	0	1–10	0–5	2–4	

Group B

Team	Pld	W	L	D	GF	GA	GD	Pts	Italy men's national junior ice hockey team	Spain men's national junior ice hockey team	Great Britain men's national junior ice hockey team	Australia men's national junior ice hockey team
Italy	3	2	0	1	30	8	+22	5		2–2	12–4	16–2
Spain	3	2	0	1	14	9	+5	5	2–2		7–3	5–4
Great Britain	3	1	2	0	14	24	−10	2	4–12	3–7		7–5
Australia	3	0	3	0	11	28	−17	0	2–16	4–5	5–7	

=== Final Round ===
Promotion Group

Team	Pld	W	L	D	GF	GA	GD	Pts	Italy men's national junior ice hockey team	Bulgaria men's national junior ice hockey team	Hungary men's national junior ice hockey team	Spain men's national junior ice hockey team
Italy	3	2	0	1	13	8	+5	5		3–1	8–5	2–2
Bulgaria	3	1	1	1	14	9	+5	3	1–3		3–3	10–3
Hungary	3	1	1	1	18	15	+3	3	5–8	3–3		10–4
Spain	3	0	2	1	9	22	−13	1	2–2	3–10	4–10	

Italy was promoted to Pool B for 1985.

Consolation Group

Team	Pld	W	L	D	GF	GA	GD	Pts	Belgium men's national junior ice hockey team	Great Britain men's national junior ice hockey team	Australia men's national junior ice hockey team	Italy
Belgium	3	3	0	0	21	7	+14	6		9–2	8–3	4–2
Great Britain	3	2	1	0	15	17	−2	4	2–9		7–5	6–3
Australia	3	1	2	0	13	16	−3	2	3–8	5–7		5–1
Italy B	3	0	3	0	6	15	−9	0	2–4	3–6	1–5	
