= 1990 World Junior Ice Hockey Championships =

1990 IIHF World U20 Championship

Tournament details
- Host country: Finland
- Venues: 4 (in 4 host cities)
- Dates: December 26, 1989 – January 4, 1990
- Teams: 8

Final positions
- Champions: Canada (4th title)
- Runners-up: Soviet Union
- Third place: Czechoslovakia
- Fourth place: Finland

Tournament statistics
- Games played: 28
- Goals scored: 261 (9.32 per game)
- Scoring leader: (Czechoslovakia) Robert Reichel (21 points)

The 1990 World Junior Ice Hockey Championships (1990 WJHC) was the 14th edition of the Ice Hockey World Junior Championship and was held mainly in Helsinki, Finland. Canada won the gold medal, its fourth world junior championship, while the Soviet Union and Czechoslovakia won silver and bronze, respectively.

== Final standings ==
The 1990 tournament was a round-robin format, with the top three teams winning gold, silver and bronze medals respectively.

Pos	Team	Pld	W	L	D	GF	GA	GD	Pts
1	Canada	7	5	1	1	36	18	+18	11
2	Soviet Union	7	5	1	1	50	23	+27	11
3	Czechoslovakia	7	5	2	0	51	17	+34	10
4	Finland	7	4	2	1	32	21	+11	9
5	Sweden	7	4	2	1	38	29	+9	9
6	Norway	7	2	5	0	25	51	−26	4
7	United States	7	1	6	0	22	37	−15	2
8	Poland	7	0	7	0	7	65	−58	0

Source: Hockey Canada

Poland was relegated to Pool B for 1991.

== Results ==
December 26, 1989	Canada	3 – 2	United States	Turku

December 26, 1989	Soviet Union	11 – 0	Poland	Kerava

December 26, 1989	Sweden	4 – 3	Norway	Kauniainen

December 26, 1989	Czechoslovakia	7 – 1	Finland	Helsinki

December 27, 1989	Soviet Union	12 – 2	Norway	Kauniainen

December 27, 1989	Czechoslovakia	7 – 1	United States	Helsinki

December 28, 1989	Canada	12 – 0	Poland	Kauniainen

December 28, 1989	Finland	5 – 2	Sweden	Turku

December 29, 1989	Canada	6 – 3	Norway	Kerava

December 29, 1989	Soviet Union	3 – 2	Finland	Turku

December 29, 1989	Czechoslovakia	11 – 1	Poland	Kauniainen

December 29, 1989	Sweden	6 – 5	United States	Helsinki

December 30, 1989	Czechoslovakia	13 – 2	Norway	Kauniainen

December 30, 1989	Soviet Union	7 – 3	United States	Helsinki

December 31, 1989	Canada	3 – 3	Finland	Helsinki

December 31, 1989	Sweden	14 – 0	Poland	Turku

January 1, 1990	Canada	6 – 4	Soviet Union	Helsinki

January 1, 1990	Czechoslovakia	7 – 2	Sweden	Turku

January 1, 1990	Finland	8 – 2	Norway	Helsinki

January 1, 1990	United States	3 – 2	Poland	Kerava

January 2, 1990	Soviet Union	8 – 5	Czechoslovakia	Helsinki

January 2, 1990	Norway	6 – 5	United States	Kerava

January 3, 1990	Sweden	5 – 4	Canada	Helsinki

January 3, 1990	Finland	7 – 1	Poland	Helsinki

January 4, 1990	Canada	2 – 1	Czechoslovakia	Turku

January 4, 1990	Soviet Union	5 – 5	Sweden	Helsinki

January 4, 1990	Norway	7 – 3	Poland	Turku

January 4, 1990	Finland	6 – 3	United States	Helsinki

=== Scoring leaders ===
Rank	Player	Country	G	A	Pts
1	Robert Reichel	Czechoslovakia	10	11	21
2	Jaromír Jágr	Czechoslovakia	5	13	18
3	Dave Chyzowski	Canada	9	4	13
4	Patric Englund	Sweden	9	2	11
5	Bobby Holík	Czechoslovakia	6	5	11
6	Andrei Kovalenko	Soviet Union	5	6	11
7	Vyacheslav Kozlov	Soviet Union	4	7	11
8	Pavel Bure	Soviet Union	7	3	10
9	Daniel Rydmark	Sweden	3	7	10
10	Roman Oksiuta	Soviet Union	7	2	9

=== Tournament awards ===
	IIHF Directorate Awards	Media All-Star Team
Goaltender	(Canada) Stéphane Fiset	(Canada) Stéphane Fiset
Defencemen	(Soviet Union) Alexander Godynyuk	(Soviet Union) Alexander Godynyuk (Czechoslovakia) Jiří Šlégr
Forwards	(Czechoslovakia) Robert Reichel	(Canada) Dave Chyzowski (Czechoslovakia) Jaromír Jágr (Czechoslovakia) Robert Reichel

== Pool B ==
Eight teams contested the second tier this year in Bad Tölz West Germany from March 26 to April 4. It was played in a simple round robin format, each team playing seven games.

Standings

Pos	Team	Pld	W	L	D	GF	GA	GD	Pts	Switzerland men's national junior ice hockey team	West Germany men's national junior ice hockey team	Japan men's national junior ice hockey team	Denmark men's national junior ice hockey team	France men's national junior ice hockey team	Austria men's national junior ice hockey team	Romania men's national junior ice hockey team	Yugoslavia men's national junior ice hockey team
1	Switzerland	7	6	1	0	48	14	+34	12		3–0	8–4	7–1	4–6	9–2	6–1	11–0
2	West Germany	7	6	1	0	35	12	+23	12	0–3		5–2	4–2	5–2	4–0	11–1	6–2
3	Japan	7	4	2	1	38	33	+5	9	4–8	2–5		5–3	5–4	9–2	6–4	7–7
4	Denmark	7	2	3	2	26	31	−5	6	1–7	2–4	3–5		6–2	4–4	5–5	5–4
5	France	7	3	4	0	39	30	+9	6	6–4	2–5	4–5	2–6		11–2	4–5	10–3
6	Austria	7	2	4	1	20	43	−23	5	2–9	0–4	2–9	4–4	2–11		3–2	7–4
7	Romania	7	2	4	1	27	39	−12	5	1–6	1–11	4–6	5–5	5–4	2–3		9–4
8	Yugoslavia	7	0	6	1	24	55	−31	1	0–11	2–6	7–7	4–5	3–10	4–7	4–9	

Switzerland was promoted to Pool A and Yugoslavia was relegated to Pool C for 1991.

== Pool C ==
Pool C was contested by seven teams in Eindhoven Netherlands from March 16 to 25. The South Korean juniors made their debut this year.

Standings

Pos	Team	Pld	W	L	D	GF	GA	GD	Pts	Netherlands men's national junior ice hockey team	North Korea men's national junior ice hockey team	Italy men's national junior ice hockey team	Bulgaria men's national junior ice hockey team	South Korea men's national junior ice hockey team	Great Britain men's national junior ice hockey team	Hungary men's national junior ice hockey team
1	Netherlands	6	5	1	0	40	17	+23	10		3–4	4–3	6–2	11–4	7–2	9–2
2	North Korea	6	4	1	1	27	14	+13	9	4–3		3–1	4–4	10–1	2–3	4–2
3	Italy	6	4	2	0	34	11	+23	8	3–4	1–3		6–1	6–0	7–1	11–2
4	Bulgaria	6	3	2	1	26	30	−4	7	2–6	4–4	1–6		7–6	3–2	9–6
5	South Korea	6	2	4	0	24	40	−16	4	4–11	1–10	0–6	6–7		6–4	7–2
6	Great Britain	6	2	4	0	18	30	−12	4	2–7	3–2	1–7	2–3	4–6		6–5
7	Hungary	6	0	6	0	19	46	−27	0	2–9	2–4	2–11	6–9	2–7	5–6	

The Netherlands was promoted to Pool B for 1991.
