= 2012 World Junior Ice Hockey Championships – Division II =

International ice hockey tournament

2012 IIHF U20 World Championship Division II

Tournament details
- Host countries: Ukraine; Estonia
- Venues: 2 (in 2 host cities)
- Dates: 12–18 December 2011; 10–16 December 2011
- Teams: 12

The 2012 World Junior Ice Hockey Championship Division II was a pair of international ice hockey tournaments organized by the International Ice Hockey Federation. In 2012, a new format was introduced to the IIHF World Junior Championships, therefore Division II A and Division II B now represent the fourth and fifth tier of the IIHF World Junior Championship. Division II was played in two groups of six teams each. In each group, the first-placed team is promoted to a higher level, while the last-placed team is relegated to a lower level. This year, for the first time, the winner of Group B is promoted to Group A and the winner of Group A is promoted to the next year's Division I. Previously, the winners of both groups were promoted to the Division I.

== Division II A ==
The Division II A tournament was played in Donetsk, Ukraine, from 12 to 18 December 2011.

=== Participating teams ===
Team	Qualification
Ukraine	Hosts; placed 6th in Division I (Group A) last year and were relegated.
Lithuania	Placed 6th in Division I (Group B) last year and were relegated.
Netherlands	Placed 2nd in Division II (Group A) last year.
Hungary	Placed 2nd in Division II (Group B) last year.
Spain	Placed 3rd in Division II (Group A) last year.
South Korea	Placed 3rd in Division II (Group B) last year.

=== Final standings ===
Pos	Team	Pld	W	OTW	OTL	L	GF	GA	GD	Pts	Promotion or relegation
1	Ukraine (H)	5	3	2	0	0	24	10	+14	13	Promoted to the 2013 Division I B
2	Lithuania	5	3	0	2	0	19	11	+8	11	
3	Hungary	5	2	1	0	2	24	15	+9	8	
4	Spain	5	2	0	0	3	14	22	−8	6	
5	Netherlands	5	1	1	0	3	9	23	−14	5	
6	South Korea	5	0	0	2	3	9	18	−9	2	Relegated to the 2013 Division II B

Source: IIHF
(H) Host

=== Match results ===
All times are local. (Eastern European Time – UTC+2)

12 December 2011; 13:00	Spain	5–0 (2–0, 1–0, 2–0)	Netherlands	Druzhba Arena, Donetsk

Game reference

12 December 2011; 16:30	Hungary	2–1 (GWS) (1–0, 0–0, 0–1) (0–0, 1–0)	Lithuania	Druzhba Arena, Donetsk

Game reference

12 December 2011; 20:00	Ukraine	3–2 (GWS) (0–1, 0–0, 2–1) (0–0, 1–0)	South Korea	Druzhba Arena, Donetsk

Game reference

14 December 2011; 13:00	Lithuania	6–2 (2–1, 1–1, 3–0)	Netherlands	Druzhba Arena, Donetsk

Game reference

14 December 2011; 16:30	South Korea	3–4 (3–1, 0–1, 0–2)	Spain	Druzhba Arena, Donetsk

Game reference

14 December 2011; 20:00	Ukraine	7–6 (3–2, 1–3, 3–1)	Hungary	Druzhba Arena, Donetsk

Game reference

15 December 2011; 13:00	Lithuania	2–0 (0–0, 1–0, 1–0)	South Korea	Druzhba Arena, Donetsk

Game reference

15 December 2011; 16:30	Hungary	3–4 (0–0, 0–3, 3–1)	Netherlands	Druzhba Arena, Donetsk

Game reference

15 December 2010; 20:00	Ukraine	4–0 (0–0, 2–0, 2–0)	Spain	Druzhba Arena, Donetsk

Game reference

17 December 2011; 13:00	South Korea	2–6 (1–2, 0–2, 1–2)	Hungary	Druzhba Arena, Donetsk

Game reference

17 December 2011; 16:30	Spain	4–8 (1–0, 2–5, 1–3)	Lithuania	Druzhba Arena, Donetsk

Game reference

17 December 2011; 20:00	Netherlands	0–7 (0–1, 0–2, 0–4)	Ukraine	Druzhba Arena, Donetsk

Game reference

18 December 2011; 12:00	Hungary	7–1 (3–0, 2–1, 2–0)	Spain	Druzhba Arena, Donetsk

Game reference

18 December 2011; 15:30	Netherlands	3–2 (GWS) (1–0, 1–2, 0–0) (0–0, 1–0)	South Korea	Druzhba Arena, Donetsk

Game reference

18 December 2011; 19:00	Lithuania	2–3 (OT) (0–1, 2–1, 0–0) (0–1)	Ukraine	Druzhba Arena, Donetsk

Game reference

=== Statistics ===
==== Top 10 scorers ====
Pos	Player	Country	GP	G	A	Pts	+/-	PIM
1	Viktor Zakharov	Ukraine	5	7	2	9	+1	4
2	Attila Nemeth	Hungary	5	6	3	9	+6	12
3	Aimas Fiscevas	Lithuania	5	3	5	8	0	2
4	Richard Hardi	Hungary	5	2	6	8	+2	22
5	Pablo Puyelo	Spain	5	3	4	7	+2	6
6	Daniel Bogdziul	Lithuania	5	2	5	7	+1	0
7	Pijus Rulevicius	Lithuania	4	5	1	6	0	0
8	Pavlo Padakin	Ukraine	5	3	3	6	+3	8
8	Gergo Toth	Hungary	5	3	3	6	+6	2
10	Vladislav Kutchevich	Ukraine	5	2	4	6	+6	4

==== Goaltending leaders ====
(minimum 40% team's total ice time)

Pos	Player	Country	MINS	GA	Sv%	GAA	SO
1	Mantas Armalis	Lithuania	309:03	11	94.36	2.14	1
2	Kye Hoon Park	South Korea	275:38	14	92.47	3.05	0
3	Pavlo Yachnyk	Ukraine	309:58	10	92.19	1.94	2
4	Deniz Mollen	Netherlands	229:09	14	90.91	3.67	0
5	Bruno González	Spain	140:00	10	90.00	4.29	1

==== IIHF Best Players awards ====
- Goaltender: (Lithuania) Mantas Armalis
- Defenceman: (Ukraine) Valentyn Sirchenko
- Forward: (Ukraine) Viktor Zakharov

== Division II B ==
The Division II B tournament was played in Tallinn, Estonia, from 10 to 16 December 2011.

=== Participating teams ===
Team	Qualification
Belgium	Placed 4th in Division II (Group A) last year.
Romania	Placed 4th in Division II (Group B) last year.
Estonia	Hosts; placed 5th in Division II (Group A) last year.
Australia	Placed 5th in Division II (Group B) last year.
Mexico	Placed 1st in Division III last year and were promoted.
Serbia	Placed 2nd in Division III last year and were promoted.

=== Final standings ===
Pos	Team	Pld	W	OTW	OTL	L	GF	GA	GD	Pts	Promotion or relegation
1	Romania	5	5	0	0	0	44	9	+35	15	Promoted to the 2013 Division II A
2	Estonia (H)	5	4	0	0	1	51	14	+37	12	
3	Serbia	5	3	0	0	2	18	26	−8	9	
4	Belgium	5	1	1	0	3	17	23	−6	5	
5	Australia	5	1	0	0	4	12	36	−24	3	
6	Mexico	5	0	0	1	4	5	39	−34	1	Relegated to the 2013 Division III

Source: IIHF
(H) Host

=== Match results ===
All times are local. (Eastern European Time – UTC+2)

10 December 2011; 13:00	Belgium	3–2 (GWS) (1–1, 0–1, 1–0) (0–0, 1–0)	Mexico	Arena Premia, Tallinn

Game reference

10 December 2011; 16:30	Serbia	4–2 (2–0, 2–0, 0–2)	Australia	Arena Premia, Tallinn

Game reference

10 December 2011; 20:00	Estonia	2–8 (1–1, 1–2, 0–5)	Romania	Arena Premia, Tallinn

Game reference

11 December 2011; 13:00	Mexico	1–4 (0–0, 1–2, 0–2)	Serbia	Arena Premia, Tallinn

Game reference

11 December 2011; 16:30	Romania	11–1 (2–1, 4–0, 5–0)	Australia	Arena Premia, Tallinn

Game reference

11 December 2011; 20:00	Belgium	2–7 (1–3, 0–3, 1–1)	Estonia	Arena Premia, Tallinn

Game reference

13 December 2011; 13:00	Romania	10–1 (3–0, 6–0, 1–1)	Mexico	Arena Premia, Tallinn

Game reference

13 December 2011; 16:30	Belgium	2–4 (1–2, 1–2, 0–0)	Serbia	Arena Premia, Tallinn

Game reference

13 December 2011; 20:00	Estonia	12–1 (4–0, 5–0, 3–1)	Australia	Arena Premia, Tallinn

Game reference

14 December 2011; 13:00	Serbia	3–9 (1–2, 1–3, 1–4)	Romania	Arena Premia, Tallinn

Game reference

14 December 2011; 16:30	Australia	4–8 (1–1, 1–3, 2–4)	Belgium	Arena Premia, Tallinn

Game reference

14 December 2011; 20:00	Mexico	0–18 (0–6, 0–4, 0–8)	Estonia	Arena Premia, Tallinn

Game reference

16 December 2011; 13:00	Australia	4–1 (0–1, 1–0, 3–0)	Mexico	Arena Premia, Tallinn

Game reference

16 December 2011; 16:30	Romania	6–2 (2–1, 2–1, 2–0)	Belgium	Arena Premia, Tallinn

Game reference

16 December 2011; 20:00	Estonia	12–3 (4–0, 6–1, 2–2)	Serbia	Arena Premia, Tallinn

Game reference

=== Statistics ===
==== Top 10 scorers ====
Pos	Player	Country	GP	G	A	Pts	+/-	PIM
1	Robert Rooba	Estonia	5	13	6	19	+10	0
2	Artjom Gornostajev	Estonia	5	6	13	19	+11	6
3	Matyas Biro	Romania	5	8	9	17	+11	10
3	Roberto Gliga	Romania	5	8	9	17	+12	2
5	Zsombor Molnar	Romania	5	4	9	13	+5	2
6	Anton Gurtovoi	Estonia	5	5	5	10	+8	0
7	Aleksa Lukovic	Serbia	4	5	4	9	-2	18
8	Dimitrije Filipovic	Serbia	5	5	4	9	-2	28
9	Jordan Kyros	Australia	4	7	1	8	-5	6
10	Keven Leppimann	Estonia	4	5	3	8	+6	2

==== Goaltending leaders ====
(minimum 40% team's total ice time)

Pos	Player	Country	MINS	GA	Sv%	GAA	SO
1	Szabolcs Szakacs	Romania	180:00	5	91.38	1.67	0
2	Zoltan Toke	Romania	120:00	4	90.48	2.00	0
3	Aleksei Arno	Estonia	209:33	7	89.23	2.00	0
4	Mike Jansen	Belgium	244:27	19	88.48	4.66	0
5	Jovan Feher	Serbia	264:34	21	86.09	4.76	0

==== IIHF Best Players awards ====
- Goaltender: (Serbia) Jovan Feher
- Defenceman: (Estonia) Ken Kuusk
- Forward: (Romania) Roberto Gliga
