= Romania men's national junior ice hockey team =

Romania
- The Coat of arms of Romania is used as the badge on the team jerseys
- Association: Romanian Ice Hockey Federation
- General manager: (Romania) Attila Ferenc Nagy
- Head coach: (Germany) Otto Keresztes
- Assistants: (Romania) Marius Trandafir
- Captain: Roberto Gliga
- Most games: Roberto Gliga (25)
- Most points: Roberto Gliga (43)
- Team colors
- IIHF code: ROU

First international
- Romania 10 – 2 Australia (Bucharest, Romania; 3 March 1983)

Biggest win
- Romania 25 – 0 Bulgaria (Novi Sad, Yugoslavia; 1 January 1999)

Biggest defeat
- Germany 16 – 3 Romania (Rouen, France; 18 March 1987)

IIHF World U20 Championship
- Appearances: 43 (first in 1983)
- Best result: 10th (1988)

International record (W–L–T)
- 73-92-10

The Romania men's national under 20 ice hockey team is the national under-20 ice hockey team of Romania. The team is controlled by the Romanian Ice Hockey Federation, a member of the International Ice Hockey Federation.

== History ==
Romania played its first game in 1983 against Australia during the Pool C tournament of the 1983 IIHF World U20 Championship. Romania won the game 10–2. Romania also gained promotion to Pool B for 1984 after winning all six of their games and finishing first in the standings. They remained in Pool B up until the 1994 IIHF World U20 Championship where they finished last and were relegated back to Pool C for the 1995 World Championships. Romania competed in the Pool C tournament of the World Championships for the next four years but at the 1998 IIHF World U20 Championship they finished last in the Pool C tournament after losing to Great Britain and were relegated to Pool D. In 2001 after the a change in the format of the World Championships Romania was reseeded into the newly formed Division III tournament. They remained in the Division III tournament for two years before gaining promotion to Division II due to a restructuring which increased the number of teams in Division II to 12. In 2012 they finished first in the Division II Group B tournament being held in Tallinn, Estonia and gained promotion to Division II Group A. Following promotion in 2012 Romania competed in the 2013 IIHF U20 World Championship Division II Group A tournament being held in Brașov, Romania. The team finished third and retained their spot in Division II Group A for the following year.

Roberto Gliga currently holds the team record for most points with 43. Gliga competed at five World Championships for the Romanian under-20 team from 2009 to 2013 with his best result in 2012, when he scored 17 points in the Division II Group B tournament at the 2012 IIHF World U20 Championship.

== International competitions ==
=== World Junior Championships ===
- 1983 – 17th overall (1st in Pool C)
- 1984 – 15th overall (7th in Pool B)
- 1985 – 15th overall (7th in Pool B)
- 1986 – 12th overall (4th in Pool B)
- 1987 – 14th overall (6th in Pool B)
- 1988 – 10th overall (2nd in Pool B)
- 1989 – 11th overall (3rd in Pool B)
- 1990 – 15th overall (7th in Pool B)
- 1991 – 13th overall (5th in Pool B)
- 1992 – 13th overall (5th in Pool B)
- 1993 – 15th overall (7th in Pool B)
- 1994 – 16th overall (8th in Pool B)
- 1995 – 22nd overall (6th in Pool C, Group 1)
- 1996 – 24th overall (6th in Pool C)
- 1997 – 24th overall (6th in Pool C)
- 1998 – 26th overall (8th in Pool C)
- 1999 – 29th overall (3rd in Pool D)
- 2000 – 28th overall (2nd in Pool D)
- 2001 – 29th overall (3rd in Division III)
- 2002 – 30th overall (4th in Division III)
- 2003 – 27th overall (3rd in Division II, Group A)
- 2004 – 26th overall (2nd in Division II, Group A)
- 2005 – 26th overall (2nd in Division II, Group A)
- 2006 – 26th overall (3rd in Division II, Group A)
- 2007 – 26th overall (2nd in Division II Group A)
- 2008 – 31st overall (5th in Division II Group A)
- 2009 – 33rd overall (6th in Division II Group A)
- 2010 – 28th overall (3rd in Division II Group B)
- 2011 – 29th overall (4th in Division II Group B)
- 2012 – 29th overall (1st in Division IIB)
- 2013 – 25th overall (3rd in Division IIA)
- 2014 – 27th overall (5th in Division IIA)
- 2015 – 28th overall (6th in Division IIA)
- 2016 – 29th overall (1st in Division IIB)
- 2017 – 25th overall (3rd in Division IIA)
- 2018 – 27th overall (5th in Division IIA)
- 2019 – 26th overall (4th in Division IIA)
- 2020 – 26th overall (4th in Division IIA)
- 2021 – Cancelled due to the COVID-19 pandemic
- 2022 – 28th overall (6th in Division IIA)
- 2023 – 28th overall (6th in Division IIA)
- 2024 – 29th overall (1st in Division IIB)
- 2025 – 24th overall (2nd in Division IIA)
- 2026 – 26th overall (4th in Division IIA)
