= Estonia men's national junior ice hockey team =

Men's national junior ice hockey team representing Estonia

Estonia
- Association: Estonian Ice Hockey Association
- General manager: (Estonia) Juri Rooba
- Head coach: (Finland) Simo Luukkainen
- Assistants: (Estonia) Otto Myllyen & Turo Teittinen
- Captain: Robert Rooba
- Most games: Robert Rooba & Ken Kuusk (25)
- Top scorer: Aleksandr Petrov (28)
- Most points: Robert Rooba (54)
- IIHF code: EST

First international
- Slovenia 4 – 3 Estonia (Riga, Latvia; November 10, 1992)

Biggest win
- Estonia 34 – 2 Greece (Riga, Latvia; November 12, 1992)

Biggest defeat
- Slovenia 22 – 2 Estonia (Herisau, Switzerland; December 15, 2008)

IIHF World U20 Championship
- Appearances: 33 (first in 1993)
- Best result: 18th (2026)

International record (W–L–T)
- 48–52–4

The Estonian men's national under 20 ice hockey team is the national under-20 ice hockey team in Estonia. The team represents Estonia at the International Ice Hockey Federation's World Junior Hockey Championship Division I.

== World Junior Championships record ==
Year	GP	W	OTW	T	OTL	L	GF	GA	GD	Pts	Rank
1993	4	2	–	0	–	2	46	21	+25	4	4th in Qualif. Pool for Pool C (3rd in Group A)
1994	3	0	–	0	–	3	3	24	−21	0	6th in Qualif. Pool for Pool C (4th in Group A)
1995	5	2	–	2	–	1	24	25	−1	6	3rd in Pool C2
1996	3	2	–	0	–	1	24	5	+19	4	2nd in Pool D
1997	4	4	–	0	–	0	46	11	+35	6	Won Pool D
1998	4	1	–	0	–	3	7	23	−16	2	6th in Pool C (3rd in Group A)
1999	4	2	–	1	–	1	13	11	+2	5	5th in Pool C (3rd in Group B)
2000	4	0	–	1	–	3	11	28	−17	1	6th in Pool C (3rd in Group A)
2001	4	0	–	0	–	4	6	15	−9	0	8th in Division II (4th in Group B)
2002	4	4	–	0	–	0	42	10	+32	6	Won Division III
2003	5	5	–	0	–	0	62	8	+54	10	Won Division II
2004	5	1	–	0	–	4	9	33	−24	2	10th in Division I (5th in Group B)
2005	5	0	–	0	–	5	6	41	−35	0	12th in Division I (6th in Group B)
2006	5	5	–	0	–	0	46	8	+38	10	2nd in Division II (1st in Group B)
2007	5	0	0	–	0	5	5	25	−20	0	12th in Division I (6th in Group A)
2008	5	4	0	–	1	0	35	8	+27	14	2nd in Division II (1st in Group B)
2009	5	0	0	–	0	5	6	76	−70	0	12th in Division I (6th in Group A)
2010	5	0	0	–	3	2	15	24	−9	3	10th in Division II (5th in Group B)
2011	5	1	0	–	0	4	16	29	−13	3	10th in Division II (5th in Group A) – host nation
2012	5	4	0	–	0	1	51	14	+37	12	8th in Division II (2nd in group B)
2013	5	5	0	–	0	0	62	6	+56	15	7th in Division IIB
2014	5	2	0	–	0	3	11	19	−8	6	4th in Division IIA
2015	5	1	0	–	1	3	12	22	−10	4	5th in Division IIA
2016	5	3	0	–	0	2	27	26	+1	9	3rd in Division IIA
2017	5	2	0	–	0	3	18	24	−6	6	4th in Division IIA
2018	5	1	0	–	1	3	20	25	−5	4	4th in Division IIA
2019	5	4	1	–	0	0	25	7	+18	14	1st in Division IIA – host nation
2020	5	1	0	-	0	4	14	27	-13	3	5th in Division IB
2021	Cancelled due to the COVID-19 pandemic										
2022	5	0	1	-	0	4	9	25	-16	2	5th in Division IB
2023	5	1	0	-	1	3	11	14	-3	4	5th in Division IB
2024	5	2	0	-	0	3	15	18	-3	6	4th in Division IB
2025	5	2	0	-	0	3	16	23	-7	6	4th in Division IB – host nation
2026	5	2	1	-	1	1	18	14	+4	9	2nd in Division IB
2027				-							Division IB

== See also ==
- Estonia men's national ice hockey team
- Estonia men's national under-18 ice hockey team
