= Eliot Berthon =

French professional ice hockey player

- Born: April 27, 1992 (age 32); Lyon, France
- Height: 5 ft 7 in (170 cm)
- Weight: 185 lb (84 kg; 13 st 3 lb)
- Position: Forward
- Shot: Left
- Played for: Lausanne HC; EHC Biel; HC Ambrì-Piotta; HC La Chaux-de-Fonds; Genève-Servette HC
- National team: France
- Playing career: 2010–2024

Eliot Berthon (born April 27, 1992) is a French former professional ice hockey forward who spent all of his career in Switzerland in both the National League (NL) and the Swiss League (SL). He played with a Swiss player-license and didn't count as an import player.

== Playing career ==
Berthon has mostly been a journeyman in the National League, failing to establish himself on any team he played for. On January 3, 2016, he was once again shipped from EHC Biel to HC Ambrì-Piotta.

On May 24, 2018, Berthon returned to Genève-Servette HC on a one-year deal worth CHF 350,000 with agreements to play in either the Swiss League or the MySports League, for Geneva's affiliates. Berthon appeared in 22 games for Geneva before being suspended for one game and fined CHF 2,500 on November 25, for an illegal check from behind during a game against HC Fribourg-Gottéron on November 24, 2018.

Berthon had an option for the 2019–20 season on his contract which was activated in the summer of 2019. On November 18, 2019, Berthon was signed to an early two-year contract extension through the 2021–22 season.

== International play ==
Berthon was named to the France men's national ice hockey team for competition at the 2014 IIHF World Championship.

Berthon was a member of the 2019 French team that got relegated to Division I A at the WC.
