= Hungary men's national junior ice hockey team =

Hungary
- Nickname: The Coat of Arms of Hungary is used as the badge on the team jerseys
- Association: Hungarian Ice Hockey Federation
- Head coach: (Canada) Tim Kehler
- Assistants: (Canada) Tyler Dietrich (Hungary) Bence Svasznek
- Captain: Mate Arany
- Most points: Balazs Somogyi (37)
- Team colors
- IIHF code: HUN

First international
- Austria 19 - 3 Hungary (Klagenfurt, Austria; March 7, 1980)

Biggest win
- Hungary 28 - 0 Mexico (Debrecen, Hungary; December 14, 2009)

Biggest defeat
- Austria 19 - 3 Hungary (Klagenfurt, Austria; March 7, 1980

IIHF World U20 Championship
- Appearances: 42 (first in 1980)
- Best result: 14th (1996, 2023)

International record (W–L–T)
- 60–78–8

The Hungarian men's national under 20 ice hockey team is the national under-20 ice hockey team in Hungary. The team represents Hungary at the International Ice Hockey Federation's IIHF World U20 Championship.

== International competitions ==
=== IIHF World U20 Championships ===
- 1980: 16th overall (8th in Pool B)
- 1981: Did not Participate
- 1982: Did not Participate
- 1983: 19th overall (3rd in Pool C)
- 1984: 19th overall (3rd in Pool C)
- 1985: 18th overall (2nd in Pool C)
- 1986: 21st overall (5th in Pool C)
- 1987: Did not Participate
- 1988: 22nd overall (6th in Pool C)
- 1989: Did not Participate
- 1990: 23rd overall (7th in Pool C)
- 1991: 23rd overall (7th in Pool C)
- 1992: 21st overall (5th in Pool C)
- 1993: 19th overall (3rd in Pool C)
- 1994: 21st overall (5th in Pool C)
- 1995: 18th overall (2nd in Pool C1)
- 1996: 14th overall (4th in Pool B)
- 1997: 17th overall (7th in Pool B)
- 1998: 15th overall (5th in Pool B)
- 1999: 18th overall (8th in Pool B)
- 2000: 22nd overall (4th in Pool C)
- 2001: 25th overall (7th in Division II)
- 2002: 24th overall (6th in Division II)
- 2003: 24th overall (1st in Division IIB)
- 2004: 22nd overall (6th in Division IA)
- 2005: 23rd overall (1st in Division IIB)
- 2006: 21st overall (6th in Division IB)
- 2007: 23rd overall (1st in Division IIA)
- 2008: 17th overall (4th in Division IB)
- 2009: 21st overall (6th in Division IB)
- 2010: 25th overall (2nd in Division IIA)
- 2011: 25th overall (2nd in Division IIB)
- 2012: 25th overall (3rd in Division IIA)
- 2013: 24th overall (2nd in Division IIA)
- 2014: 23rd overall (1st in Division IIA)
- 2015: 22nd overall (6th in Division IB)
- 2016: 23rd overall (1st in Division IIA)
- 2017: 17th overall (1st in Division IB)
- 2018: 16th overall (6th in Division IA)
- 2019: 19th overall (3rd in Division IB)
- 2020: 17th overall (1st in Division IB)
- 2021: Cancelled due to the COVID-19 pandemic
- 2022: 16th overall (6th in Division IA)
- 2023: 14th overall (4th in Division IA)
- 2024: 15th overall (5th in Division IA)
- 2025: 16th overall (6th in Division IA)
- 2026: 17th overall (1st in Division IB)
