= 2013 World Junior Ice Hockey Championships – Division II =

International ice hockey tournament

2013 IIHF U20 World Championship Division II

Tournament details
- Host countries: Romania; Serbia
- Venue(s): 2 (in 2 host cities)
- Dates: 9–15 December 2012; 12–18 January 2013
- Teams: 12

The 2013 World Junior Ice Hockey Championship Division II was a pair of international ice hockey tournaments organized by the International Ice Hockey Federation. Each of the two groups consisted of six teams; the first-placed teams were promoted to a higher level, while the last-placed teams were relegated to a lower level. Divisions II A and II B represent the fourth and the fifth tier of the World Junior Ice Hockey Championships.

== Division II A ==
The Division II A tournament was played in Brașov, Romania, from 9 to 15 December 2012.

=== Participating teams ===
| Team | Qualification |
|---|---|
| Japan | Placed 6th in Division I B last year and were relegated. |
| Lithuania | Placed 2nd in Division II A last year. |
| Hungary | Placed 3rd in Division II A last year. |
| Spain | Placed 4th in Division II A last year. |
| Netherlands | Placed 5th in Division II A last year. |
| Romania | Hosts; placed 1st in Division II B last year and were promoted. |

=== Match officials ===
Referees

- (Russia) Alexei Belov
- (Belgium) Chris Deweerdt
- (Norway) Per Gustav Solem
- (Germany) Jens Steinecke

Linesmen

- (Latvia) Edvards Briedis
- (Romania) Mihai Butucel
- (Slovenia) Jan Cerne
- (Belarus) Dmitry Golyak
- (Croatia) Tomislav Grozaj
- (Poland) Wojciech Moszczynski
- (Romania) Adrian Cosmin Toparceanu

=== Final standings ===
| Pos | Team | Pld | W | OTW | OTL | L | GF | GA | GD | Pts | Promotion or relegation |
|---|---|---|---|---|---|---|---|---|---|---|---|
| 1 | Japan | 5 | 5 | 0 | 0 | 0 | 31 | 8 | +23 | 15 | Promoted to the 2014 Division I B |
| 2 | Hungary | 5 | 3 | 1 | 0 | 1 | 22 | 16 | +6 | 11 | |
| 3 | Romania (H) | 5 | 3 | 0 | 0 | 2 | 18 | 19 | −1 | 9 | |
| 4 | Netherlands | 5 | 2 | 0 | 1 | 2 | 17 | 23 | −6 | 7 | |
| 5 | Lithuania | 5 | 1 | 0 | 0 | 4 | 14 | 19 | −5 | 3 | |
| 6 | Spain | 5 | 0 | 0 | 0 | 5 | 12 | 29 | −17 | 0 | Relegated to the 2014 Division II B |

Source: IIHF
(H) Host

=== Match results ===
All times are local. (Eastern European Time – UTC+2)

| 9 December 2012; 13:00 | Lithuania | 1–2 (0–1, 0–0, 1–1) | Netherlands | Brașov Olympic Ice Rink, Brașov; Attendance: 50 |

Game reference

Simas Baltrunas
Goalies
Deniz Mollen
Referee:
(Norway) Per Gustav Solem
Linesmen:
(Latvia) Edvards Briedis
(Romania) Mihai Butucel

| | 0–1 | 19:58 – T. Ras (R. van Haren) |
| D. Bogdziul (A. Fiscevas, D. Mikalauskas (PP) – 50:07 | 1–1 |
| | 1–2 | 53:02 – R. de Hondt (J. Knoren, B. Donders) |

6 min
Penalties
8 min
18
Shots
29

| 9 December 2012; 16:30 | Hungary | 2–7 (1–1, 1–0, 0–6) | Japan | Brașov Olympic Ice Rink, Brașov; Attendance: 200 |

Game reference

Jozsef Pleszkan
Goalies
Shun Hitomi
Referee:
(Belgium) Chris Deweerdt
Linesmen:
(Poland) Wojciech Moszczynski
(Romania) Adrian Cosmin Toparceanu

| | 0–1 | 04:00 – K. Otsu (T. Ishikawa) (PP) |
| K. Nagy (D. Szabo, M. Miskolczi) (PP) – 05:37 | 1–1 |
| T. Sarpatki (C. Erdely, M. Miskolczi) (PP) – 35:56 | 2–1 |
| | 2–2 | 47:04 – S. Tateda (T. Ishikawa, H. Sato) |
| | 2–3 | 49:32 – Y. Osawa (H. Sato, M. Furuhashi) (PP) |
| | 2–4 | 52:20 – Y. Osawa (PP) |
| | 2–5 | 54:20 – S. Nakajima (Y. Yokoyama, J. Hashimot) (PP) |
| | 2–6 | 57:10 – R. Sarashiya (S. Nakajima, Y. Yokoyama) (PP) |
| | 2–7 | 58:16 – K. Sarashiya (M. Furuhashi, K. Takagi) |

53 min
Penalties
18 min
31
Shots
41

| 9 December 2012; 20:00 | Romania | 6–3 (1–1, 1–1, 4–1) | Spain | Brașov Olympic Ice Rink, Brașov; Attendance: 450 |

Game reference

Zoltan Toke
Goalies
Bruno Gonzalez
Referee:
(Germany) Jens Steinecke
Linesmen:
(Slovenia) Jan Cerne
(Belarus) Dimitry Golyak

| H. Marton (A. Sallo, G. Biro) – 06:12 | 1–0 |
| | 1–1 | 07:18 – I. Gainza (A. Carbonell, I. Solorzano) |
| M. Biro (Zs. Molnar, H. Gecse) – 24:33 | 2–1 |
| | 2–2 | 37:36 – D. Alvarez (A. Carbonell, I. Solorzano) |
| | 2–3 | 44:16 – C. Quevedo (P. Puyuelo, A. Ubieto) |
| H. Bors (Z. Molnar) – 44:44 | 3–3 |
| D. Hodos (R. Gliga, D. Tranca) (PP) – 56:06 | 4–3 |
| R. Gliga (Zs. Molnar) (ENG) – 59:18 | 5–3 |
| Zo. Molnar (H. Csergo, G. Biro) – 59:56 | 6–3 |

8 min
Penalties
10 min
43
Shots
17

| 10 December 2012; 13:00 | Lithuania | 1–3 (0–2, 1–1, 0–0) | Hungary | Brașov Olympic Ice Rink, Brașov; Attendance: 50 |

Game reference

Donatas Zukovas
Goalies
Oliver Agoston
Referee:
(Germany) Jens Steinecke
Linesmen:
(Slovenia) Jan Cerne
(Belarus) Dimitry Golyak

| | 0–1 | 05:51 – D. Szabo (C. Erdely) (SH) |
| | 0–2 | 11:22 – S. Hamvai (L. Rito, B. Arkovics) |
| E. Protcenko (D. Bogdziul, A. Fiscevas) (PP) – 23:39 | 1–2 |
| | 1–3 | 37:46 – Z. Fliszar (T. Sarpatki, M. Miskolczi) (PP) |

29 min
Penalties
12 min
24
Shots
26

| 10 December 2012; 16:30 | Japan | 6–1 (2–1, 4–0, 0–0) | Spain | Brașov Olympic Ice Rink, Brașov; Attendance: 50 |

Game reference

Yuya Wakimoto
Goalies
Bruno Gonzalez
Guillermo Sol
Referee:
(Norway) Per Gustav Solem
Linesmen:
(Latvia) Edwards Briedis
(Romania) Adrian cosmin Toparceanu

| | 0–1 | 00:27 – P. Puyuelo |
| S. Nakajima (K. Takagi) – 00:52 | 1–1 |
| T. Ishikawa (H. Sato, Y. Osawa) (PP) – 05:48 | 2–1 |
| K. Otsu (K. Sarashiya, Y. Hirano) – 23:03 | 3–1 |
| H. Sato (M. Furuhashi, Y. Osawa) (PP2) – 25:07 | 4–1 |
| Y. Osawa (PP) – 31:19 | 5–1 |
| Y. Yokoyama (K. Takagi) (PP) – 35:33 | 6–1 |

8 min
Penalties
33 min
51
Shots
13

| 10 December 2012; 20:00 | Netherlands | 4–5 (1–4, 0–1, 3–0) | Romania | Brașov Olympic Ice Rink, Brașov; Attendance: 300 |

Game reference

Deniz Mollen
Goalies
Zoltan Toke
Referee:
(Belgium) Chris Deweerdt
Linesmen:
(Croatia) Tomislav Grozaj
(Poland) Wojciech Moszczynski

| | 0–1 | 07:00 – S. Hildebrand (D. Tranca, G. Biro) |
| | 0–2 | 10:56 – D. Tranca (Zs. Molnar) (PP2) |
| D. Stempher (T. Ras) (PP) – 16:35 | 1–2 |
| | 1–3 | 17:15 – G. Biro (S. Hildebrand, D. Tranca) |
| | 1–4 | 18:05 – A. Sallo |
| | 1–5 | 37:37 – D. Dumitru (R. Gliga (PP) |
| D. Stempher (PP2) – 41:17 | 2–5 |
| D. Stempher (T. Marx, T. Ras) – 47:59 | 3–5 |
| T. Marx (J. Verkiel, T. Ras) – 57:02 | 4–5 |

12 min
Penalties
16 min
32
Shots
29

| 12 December 2012; 13:00 | Hungary | 6–2 (1–1, 3–0, 2–1) | Spain | Brașov Olympic Ice Rink, Brașov; Attendance: 30 |

Game reference

Oliver Agoston
Goalies
Bruno Gonzalez
Referee:
(Belgium) Chris Deweerdt
Linesmen:
(Romania) Mihai Butucel
(Croatia) Tomislav Grozaj

| G. Toth (A. Konczei) (PP) – 04:13 | 1–0 |
| | 1–1 | 17:22 – C. Quevedo (P. Puyuelo) |
| G. Toth (P. Gagyor, B. Arkovics) – 26:48 | 2–1 |
| K. Nagy (D. Szabo, Z. Fliszar) (PP) – 32:33 | 3–1 |
| G. Toth – 38:38 | 4–1 |
| K. Nagy (SH) – 56:54 | 5–1 |
| F. Focsis (P. Vincze) (SH) – 58:01 | 6–1 |
| | 6–2 | 59:36 – P. Fuentes (A.D. Lacasa, P. Puyuelo) |

16 min
Penalties
12 min
39
Shots
21

| 12 December 2012; 16:30 | Japan | 8–1 (0–1, 4–0, 4–0) | Netherlands | Brașov Olympic Ice Rink, Brașov; Attendance: 50 |

Game reference

Shun Hitomi
Goalies
Deniz Mollen
Mike Beeren
Referee:
(Germany) Jens Steinecke
Linesmen:
(Poland) Wojciech Moszczynski
(Romania) Adrian cosmin Toparceanu

| | 0–1 | 08:13 – F. van Lieshout (L. Zwartbol, W. Bless) (SH) |
| K. Sarashiya (M. Kitajima, S. Tateda) – 29:25 | 1–1 |
| M. Furuhashi (R. Nagai, J. Hashimoto) – 30:34 | 2–1 |
| Y. Osawa (Y. Hirano, K. Otsu) – 38:56 | 3–1 |
| M. Furuhashi (S. Tateda, R. Nagai) – 39:38 | 4–1 |
| K. Takagi (R. Sarashiya, K. Koizumi) (SH) – 46:28 | 5–1 |
| H. Sato (M. Furuhashi, Y. Hirano) (PP2) – 51:46 | 6–1 |
| T. Ishikawa (S. Tateda, M. Furuhashi) – 56:12 | 7–1 |
| K. Osawa (M. Omuku, H. Umeno) – 59:03 | 8–1 |

10 min
Penalties
18 min
50
Shots
14

| 12 December 2012; 20:00 | Lithuania | 3–5 (1–1, 2–1, 0–3) | Romania | Brașov Olympic Ice Rink, Brașov; Attendance: 400 |

Game reference

Simas Baltrunas
Goalies
Zoltan Toke
Referee:
(Russia) Alexei Belov
Linesmen:
(Slovenia) Jan Cerne
(Belarus) Dmitry Golyak

| L. Vezelis (S. Gorelis) – 03:25 | 1–0 |
| | 1–1 | 14:37 – G. Biro (D. Tranca) |
| | 1–2 | 24:10 – H. Bors (R. Gliga) |
| A. Fiscevas – 32:59 | 2–2 |
| I. Cervertak (J. Steponaitis) – 34:39 | 3–2 |
| | 3–3 | 40:21 – R. Gliga (M. Biro) |
| | 3–4 | 54:38 – Z. Molnar |
| | 3–5 | 59:19 – M. Biro (R. Gliga) (ENG) |

12 min
Penalties
4 min
32
Shots
35

| 13 December 2012; 13:00 | Netherlands | 5–6 OT (2–1, 1–2, 2–2) (OT: 0–1) | Hungary | Brașov Olympic Ice Rink, Brașov; Attendance: 30 |

Game reference

Deniz Mollen
Goalies
Oliver Agoston
Jozsef Pleszan
Referee:
(Russia) Alexei Belov
Linesmen:
(Latvia) Edvards Briedis
(Slovenia) Jan Cerne

| T. Ras (R. de Hondt) – 03:42 | 1–0 |
| J. Knoren (F. van Lieshout) (PP) – 12:11 | 2–0 |
| | 2–1 | 18:30 – C. Erdely (Z. Fliszar) |
| D. Stempher (L. Heutmekers) (SH) – 25:22 | 3–1 |
| | 3–2 | 25:29 – T. Sarpatki (PP) |
| | 3–3 | 32:58 – L. Rito |
| | 3–4 | 42:36 – D. Szabo (K. Nagy, F. Kocsis) (PP) |
| T. Ras (R. de Hondt, T. Marx) (PP2) – 46:07 | 4–4 |
| D. Stempher (T. Ras) (PP) – 46:41 | 5–4 |
| | 5–5 | 47:17 – K. Nagy (A. Reiter, D. Szabo) (PP) |
| | 5–6 | 61:33 – T. Sarpatki (R. Lerant) (PP) |

16 min
Penalties
35 min
26
Shots
51

| 13 December 2012; 16:30 | Spain | 3–6 (1–3, 0–2, 2–1) | Lithuania | Brașov Olympic Ice Rink, Brașov; Attendance: 70 |

Game reference

Bruno Gonzalez
Goalies
Simas Baltrunas
Referee:
(Norway) Per Gustav Solem
Linesmen:
(Romania) Mihai Butucel
(Romania) Adrian cosmin Toparceanu

| | 0–1 | 05:03 – I. Cetvertak (K. Falkas) |
| | 0–2 | 11:51 – A. Fiscevas (A. Bendzius, D. Bogdziul) (PP) |
| | 0–3 | 13:07 – D. Bogdziul (A. Fiscevas, A. Bendzius) |
| I. Solorzano (P. Puyuelo, P. Fuentes) (PP) – 19:03 | 1–3 |
| | 1–4 | 23:21 – I. Cetvertak (K. Falkas, E. Boroska) |
| | 1–5 | 27:04 – A. Fiscevas (D. Nomanovas, D. Bogdziul) |
| | 1–6 | 56:03 – K. Falkas (D. Nomanovas, I. Cetvertak) |
| C. Rivero (J. Vea, I. Gainza) – 56:46 | 2–6 |
| J. Burgos – 57:31 | 3–6 |

10 min
Penalties
8 min
19
Shots
43

| 13 December 2012; 20:00 | Romania | 1–4 (0–1, 1–0, 0–3) | Japan | Brașov Olympic Ice Rink, Brașov; Attendance: 500 |

Game reference

Zoltan Toke
Goalies
Shun Hitomi:
Referee:
(Belgium) Chris Deweerdt
Linesmen:
(Croatia) Tomislav Grozaj
(Poland) Wojciech Moszczynski

| | 0–1 | 15:36 – Y. Yokoyama (K. Takagi, J. Hashimoto) (PP) |
| D. Dumitru (R. Gliga) – 28:53 | 1–1 |
| | 1–2 | 43:26 – S. Nakajima (Y. Hirano) |
| | 1–3 | 48:53 – K. Sarashiya (R. Nagai, S. Tateda) |
| | 1–4 | 53:45 – H. Sato (S. Tateda, S. Nakajima) |

10 min
Penalties
10 min
15
Shots
41

| 15 December 2012; 13:00 | Japan | 6–3 (1–1, 2–1, 3–1) | Lithuania | Brașov Olympic Ice Rink, Brașov; Attendance: 40 |

Game reference

Yuya Wakimoto
Goalies
Donatas Zukovas
Referee:
(Russia) Alexei Belov
Linesmen:
(Latvia) Edvards Briedis
(Romania) Adrian Cosmin Toparceanu

| | 0–1 | 12:01 PP1 – A. Bendzius (A. Fiscevas, D. Bogdziul) |
| J. Hashimoto (S. Nakajima) – 19:44 | 1–1 |
| S. Nakajima (K. Takagi, J. Hashimoto) – 26:40 PP1 | 2–1 |
| K. Sarashiya (S. Nakajima, M. Furuhashi) – 29:28 | 3–1 |
| | 3–2 | 39:13 PP1 – I. Cetvertak (E. Protcenko, D. Nomanovas) |
| | 3–3 | 41:58 – D. Bogdziul (A. Fiscevas) |
| K. Takagi (M. Furuhashi, S. Nakajima) – 45:51 PP1 | 4–3 |
| Y. Osawa (Y. Hirano) – 58:51 | 5–3 |
| T. Kanemura (M. Kitajima, M. Omuku) – 59:44 | 6–3 |

8 min
Penalties
8 min
43
Shots
13

| 15 December 2012; 16:30 | Spain | 3–5 (0–3, 2–1, 1–1) | Netherlands | Brașov Olympic Ice Rink, Brașov; Attendance: 50 |

Game reference

Guillermo Sol
Goalies
Deniz Mollen
Referee:
(Germany) Jens Steinecke
Linesmen:
(Romania) Mihai Butucel
(Belarus) Dmitry Golyak

| | 0–1 | 03:24 – D. Stempher (T. Ras, R. de Hondt) |
| | 0–2 | 09:26 – R. de Hondt (D. Stempher, T. Ras) |
| | 0–3 | 14:15 – R. de Hondt (T. Ras, D. Stempher) |
| A. Ubieto (C. Rivero) – 23:34 | 1–3 |
| I. Solorzano (P. Puyuelo, P. Fuentes) (PP) – 27:03 | 2–3 |
| | 2–4 | 27:44 – T. Ras (B. Donders, D. Stempher) |
| | 2–5 | 45:13 – R. de Hondt (T. Ras, D. Stempher) |
| P. Fuentes (P. Puyuelo, I. Solorzano) – 51:16 | 3–5 |

14 min
Penalties
10 min
24
Shots
34

| 15 December 2012; 20:00 | Hungary | 5–1 (3–0, 1–1, 1–0) | Romania | Brașov Olympic Ice Rink, Brașov; Attendance: 500 |

Game reference

Oliver Agoston
Goalies
Otto Onodi
Zoltan Toke
Referee:
(Norway) Per Gustav Solem
Linesmen:
(Slovenia) Jan Cerne
(Croatia) Tomislav Grozaj

| K. Nagy (F. Kocsis, P. Vincze) – 04:40 | 1–0 |
| T. Sarpatki (M. Vojtko, M. Miskolczi) – 09:13 | 2–0 |
| P. Vincze (F. Kocsis, G. Toth) – 19:44 | 3–0 |
| L. Rito (M. Miskolczi, P. Vincze) – 26:29 | 4–0 |
| | 4–1 | 34:32 – D. Tranca (PS) |
| C. Erdely (Z. Fliszar, A. Konczei) – 42:15 | 5–1 |

8 min
Penalties
12 min
49
Shots
19

=== Statistics ===
==== Top 10 scorers ====
| Pos | Player | Country | GP | G | A | Pts | +/- | PIM |
|---|---|---|---|---|---|---|---|---|
| 1 | Tony Ras | Netherlands | 5 | 4 | 8 | 12 | +5 | 6 |
| 2 | Danny Stempher | Netherlands | 5 | 6 | 4 | 10 | +3 | 2 |
| 3 | Shogo Nakajima | Japan | 5 | 4 | 5 | 9 | +2 | 0 |
| 4 | Makuru Furuhashi | Japan | 5 | 2 | 7 | 9 | +7 | 6 |
| 5 | Aimas Fiscevas | Lithuania | 5 | 3 | 5 | 8 | −1 | 2 |
| 6 | Yuto Osawa | Japan | 5 | 5 | 2 | 7 | +3 | 4 |
| 7 | Reno de Hondt | Netherlands | 5 | 4 | 3 | 7 | +2 | 10 |
| 8 | Daniel Bogdziul | Lithuania | 5 | 3 | 4 | 7 | −2 | 12 |
| 9 | Roberto Gliga | Romania | 5 | 2 | 5 | 7 | +1 | 2 |
| 9 | Kenta Takagi | Japan | 5 | 2 | 5 | 7 | +1 | 2 |

==== Goaltending leaders ====
(minimum 40% team's total ice time)

| Pos | Player | Country | MINS | GA | Sv% | GAA | SO |
|---|---|---|---|---|---|---|---|
| 1 | Shun Hitomi | Japan | 180:00 | 4 | 93.33 | 1.33 | 0 |
| 2 | Oliver Agoston | Hungary | 229:22 | 7 | 91.67 | 1.83 | 0 |
| 3 | Simas Baltrunas | Lithuania | 179:00 | 9 | 89.16 | 3.02 | 0 |
| 4 | Zoltan Toke | Romania | 260:00 | 17 | 88.36 | 3.92 | 0 |
| 5 | Deniz Mollen | Netherlands | 281:12 | 19 | 87:97 | 4.05 | 0 |

=== Awards ===
==== Best Players Selected by the Directorate ====
- Goaltender: (Romania) Zoltan Toke
- Defenceman: (Japan) Hiroto Sato
- Forward: (Romania) Roberto Gliga

==== Best players of each team selected by the coaches ====
- (Spain) Pablo Puyuelo
- (Hungary) Krisztián Nagy
- (Japan) Yuto Osawa
- (Lithuania) Aimas Fiscevas
- (Netherlands) Danny Stempher
- (Romania) Zsombor Molnar

== Division II B ==
The Division II B tournament was played in Belgrade, Serbia, from 12 to 18 January 2013.

=== Participating teams ===
| Team | Qualification |
|---|---|
| South Korea | Placed 6th in Division II A last year and were relegated. |
| Estonia | Placed 2nd in Division II B last year. |
| Serbia | Hosts; placed 3rd in Division II B last year. |
| Belgium | Placed 4th in Division II B last year. |
| Australia | Placed 5th in Division II B last year. |
| Iceland | Placed 1st in Division III A last year and were promoted. |

=== Match officials ===
Referees

- (Latvia) Aleksandrs Borisovs
- (Netherlands) Jean Paul De Brabander
- (Italy) Michele Gastaldelli
- (Ukraine) Maksyn Urda

Linesmen

- (Serbia) Uros Aleksic
- (Finland) Markus Hagerstrom
- (Germany) Benjamin Hoppe
- (Czech Republic) Miroslav Lhotsky
- (Spain) Rudy Meyer Dainow
- (Serbia) David Parduv
- (Netherlands) Jeroen Van den Berg

=== Final standings ===
| Pos | Team | Pld | W | OTW | OTL | L | GF | GA | GD | Pts | Promotion or relegation |
|---|---|---|---|---|---|---|---|---|---|---|---|
| 1 | Estonia | 5 | 5 | 0 | 0 | 0 | 62 | 6 | +56 | 15 | Promoted to the 2014 Division II A |
| 2 | South Korea | 5 | 4 | 0 | 0 | 1 | 23 | 14 | +9 | 12 | |
| 3 | Serbia (H) | 5 | 2 | 0 | 0 | 3 | 17 | 21 | −4 | 6 | |
| 4 | Australia | 5 | 2 | 0 | 0 | 3 | 12 | 22 | −10 | 6 | |
| 5 | Iceland | 5 | 2 | 0 | 0 | 3 | 12 | 29 | −17 | 6 | |
| 6 | Belgium | 5 | 0 | 0 | 0 | 5 | 13 | 47 | −34 | 0 | Relegated to the 2014 Division III |

Source: IIHF
(H) Host

=== Match results ===
All times are local. (Central European Time – UTC+1)

| 12 January 2013; 13:00 | Iceland | 4–2 (1–0, 2–1, 1–1) | Belgium | Pionir Ice Hall, Belgrade; Attendance: 50 |

Game reference

Einar Eyland
Goalies
Neil Bruyninckx
Referee:
(Latvia) Aleksandrs Borisovs
Linesmen:
(Serbia) Uros Aleksic
(Serbia) David Parduv

| B. Sigurdarson (I. Eliasson) (PP) – 13:13 | 1–0 |
| B. Sigurdarson (SH) – 36:49 | 2–0 |
| | 2–1 | 38:19 – S. McCann-Coppens (A. Milpas (PP) |
| G. Thorsteinsson (B. Sigurdarson) (PP) – 51:48 | 3–1 |
| | 3–2 | 57:42 – M. van Egdom (PP) |
| S. Ingason (ENG) – 59:59 | 4–2 |

16 min
Penalties
16 min
31
Shots
24

| 12 January 2013; 16:30 | Estonia | 8–0 (3–0, 4–0, 1–0) | Australia | Pionir Ice Hall, Belgrade; Attendance: 50 |

Game reference

Aleksei Arno
Keir Vainumae
Goalies
Fraser Carson
Referee:
(Netherlands) Jean Paul De Brabander
Linesmen:
(Finland) Markus Hagerstrom
(Germany) Benjamin Hoppe

| A. Gornostajev (R. Rooba, M. Taru) (PP) – 4:02 | 1–0 |
| A. Gurtovoi (S. Gruznov, M. Terna) – 10:08 | 2–0 |
| K. Ljubobratets (S. Gruznov, P. Kulakov) – 13:02 | 3–0 |
| S. Gruznov (P. Kulakov, M. Terna) (PP) – 22:08 | 4–0 |
| M. Taru (R. Rooba, A. Gornostajev) – 23:14 | 5–0 |
| S. Gruznov (P. Kulakov, K. Ljubobratets) (PP) – 33:07 | 6–0 |
| M Taru (S. Potisepp, A. Gurtovoi) (PP) – 36:21 | 7–0 |
| K. Ljubobratets (S. Gruznov) (PP) – 57:23 | 8–0 |

18 min
Penalties
14 min
51
Shots
12

| 12 January 2013; 20:30 | Serbia | 2–4 (1–1, 1–2, 0–1) | South Korea | Pionir Ice Hall, Belgrade; Attendance: 1500 |

Game reference

Petar Stepanovic
Goalies
Kweonyoung Kim
Referee:
(Italy) Michele Gastaldelli
Linesmen:
(Czech Republic) Miroslav Lhotsky
(Spain) Rudy Meyer

| D. Filipovic (N. Kerezovic) – 1:21 | 1–0 |
| | 1–1 | 7:32 – SW Yoon (SW Lee) |
| | 1–2 | 29:25 – K. Park (J. Kim) |
| A. Zwick (I. Uzelac) (SH) – 35:03 | 2–2 |
| | 2–3 | 36:12 – S. Shin (DG Lee, SW Yoon) (PP) |
| | 2–4 | 46:27 – S. Shin (J. Lee) |

33 min
Penalties
17 min
19
Shots
37

| 13 January 2013; 13:00 | Australia | 3–5 (0–2, 1–3, 2–0) | Iceland | Pionir Ice Hall, Belgrade; Attendance: 35 |

Game reference

Liam Minson
Fraser Carson
Goalies
Einar Eyland
Referee:
(Ukraine) Maksym Urda
Linesmen:
(Germany) Benjamin Hoppe
(Netherlands) Jeroen van den Berg

| | 0–1 | 5:21 – B. Sigurdarson (J. Leifsson, V. Svavarsson) |
| | 0–2 | 7:43 – B. Sigurdarson (I. Eliasson, J. Leifsson) (PP2) |
| | 0–3 | 26:58 – B. Bergmann (I. Eliasson, B. Sigurdarson) (SH) |
| A. McKenzie (M. Wong, M. Humphries) – 28:24 | 1–3 |
| | 1–4 | 33:23 – B. Sigurdarson (J. Leifsson, B. Bergmann) |
| | 1–5 | 36:44 – G. Thorsteinsson (S. Sighvatsson, DS. Magnusson) |
| Scott Clemie (SH) – 53:03 | 2–5 |
| M. Humphries (A. McKenzie, M. Stringer) (PP) – 58:24 | 3–5 |

14 min
Penalties
12 min
38
Shots
26

| 13 January 2013; 16:30 | South Korea | 6–2 (1–1, 1–0, 4–1) | Belgium | Pionir Ice Hall, Belgrade; Attendance: 50 |

Game reference

Yeonseung Lee
Goalies
Neil Bruyninckx
Referee:
(Netherlands) Jean Paul De Brabander
Linesmen:
(Serbia) Uros Aleksic
(Spain) Rudy Meyer

| K. Park (J. Kim, S. Yu) – 10:52 | 1–0 |
| | 1–1 | 18:25 – E. Mondelaers (D. Swinnen) (PP) |
| S. Yu (K. Park, T. Kim) – 23:06 | 2–1 |
| S. Shin (SW. Yoon) (PP) – 40:23 | 3–1 |
| DG. Lee (SW. Yoon, S. Shin) – 48:11 | 4–1 |
| | 4–2 | 49:29 – Y. de Smet (M. van Egdom, D. Swinnen) |
| SW. Yoon (S. Shin, J. Lee) – 50:24 | 5–2 |
| SW. Yoon (J. Lee, S. Shin) – 53:27 | 6–2 |

26 min
Penalties
22 min
66
Shots
22

| 13 January 2013; 20:00 | Estonia | 9–0 (3–0, 2–0, 4–0) | Serbia | Pionir Ice Hall, Belgrade; Attendance: 600 |

Game reference

Aleksei Arno
Keir Vainumae
Goalies
Jovan Feher
Referee:
(Latvia) Aleksandrs Borisovs
Linesmen:
(Finland) Markus Hagerstrom
(Czech Republic) Miroslav Lhotsky

| P. Kulakov (K. Ljubobratets) (PP) – 6:25 | 1–0 |
| A. Gurtovoi – 11:26 | 2–0 |
| A. Gornostajev (M. Taru) – 19:18 | 3–0 |
| A. Gornostajev (SH) – 22:48 | 4–0 |
| R. Rooba (M. Taru, K. Parras) (PP) – 25:53 | 5–0 |
| M. Taru (R. Rooba, S. Kerna) – 43:53 | 6–0 |
| A. Gurtovoi (G. Filippov, A. Gornostajev) – 45:01 | 7–0 |
| A. Gornostajev (A. Maier, G. Filippov) – 45:50 | 8–0 |
| J. Missenjov (R. Rooba) – 50:46 | 9–0 |

46 min
Penalties
14 min
44
Shots
19

| 15 January 2013; 13:00 | South Korea | 5–1 (2–0, 0–1, 3–0) | Australia | Pionir Ice Hall, Belgrade; Attendance: 75 |

Game reference

Kim Kweonyoung
Goalies
Liam Minson
Referee:
(Latvia) Aleksandrs Borisovs
Linesmen:
(Serbia) David Parduv
(Netherlands) Jeroen van den Berg

| Park J. (Kwon S.G., Choi J.) (PP) – 15:13 | 1–0 |
| Shin S. (Lee J.) – 16:07 | 2–0 |
| | 2–1 | 32:06 – S. Cook (J. Woodman) (PP) |
| Yoon S.W. (Shin S.) (PP) – 40:25 | 3–1 |
| Lee D.G. (Yoon S.W.) – 47:19 | 4–1 |
| Yu S. (Park K., Kim J.) – 48:59 | 5–1 |

12 min
Penalties
12 min
32
Shots
18

| 15 January 2013; 16:30 | Estonia | 12–1 (3–1, 2–0, 7–0) | Iceland | Pionir Ice Hall, Belgrade; Attendance: 50 |

Game reference

Aleksei Arno
Goalies
Einar Eyland
Ati Valdimarsson
Referee:
(Italy) Michele Gastaldelli
Linesmen:
(Finland) Markus Hagerstrom
(Spain) Rudy Meyer

| S. Gruznov (P. Kulakov) – 06:42 | 1–0 |
| | 1–1 | 09:16 – B. Sigurdson (D. Magnusson) |
| M. Taru (S. Kerna, R. Rooba) (SH) – 14:50 | 2–1 |
| J. Missenjov (K. Parras, R. Rooba) – 19:14 | 3–1 |
| S. Gruznov (M. Terna, V. Labzin) – 33:03 | 4–1 |
| A. Gornostajev (A. Gurtovoi, R.H. Russ) – 33:14 | 5–1 |
| J. Missenjov (A. Gornostajev, V. Dotskin) – 41:12 | 6–1 |
| A. Gornostajev (P. Kulakov, R.H. Russ) – 44:03 | 7–1 |
| S. Gruznov (P. Kulakov, K. Ljubobratets) – 47:17 | 8–1 |
| R. Rooba – 48:24 | 9–1 |
| R.H. Russ (A. Gurtavoi, A. Gornostajev) – 51:05 | 10–1 |
| R. Rooba – 58:37 | 11–1 |
| M. Punger (M. Tugo) – 59:51 | 12–1 |

12 min
Penalties
16 min
60
Shots
11

| 15 January 2013; 20:00 | Serbia | 7–4 (1–1, 4–1, 2–2) | Belgium | Pionir Ice Hall, Belgrade; Attendance: 1000 |

Game reference

Petar Stepanovic
Goalies
Neil Bruyninckx
Referee:
(Ukraine) Maksym Urda
Linesmen:
(Germany) Benjamin Hoppe
(Czech Republic) Miroslav Lhotsky

| | 0–1 | 10:49 – F. Neven (M. van Egdom, D. Swinnen) (PP) |
| D. Plavsic – 17:02 | 1–1 |
| | 1–2 | 24:13 – D. Swinnen (Y. de Smet) |
| U. Bjelogrlic (P. Podunavac, D. Filipovic) – 25:18 | 2–2 |
| A. Zwick (D. Filipovic, D. Plavsic) – 30:38 | 3–2 |
| A. Babic (N. Kerezovic, U. Novakovic) (PP) – 32:12 | 4–2 |
| D. Plavsic (V. Trajkovic, A. Zwick) – 38:12 | 5–2 |
| A. Zwick (I. Anic, D. Plavsic) (PP) – 52:33 | 6–2 |
| | 6–3 | 52:50 – D. Swinnen (Y. de Smet, M. Mohlin) |
| | 6–4 | 58:28 – D. Swinnen (M. van Egdom, S. McCann-Coppens) (PP) |
| A. Babic (V. Djakovic, P. Podunavac) (EN) – 59:32 | 7–4 |

37 min
Penalties
14 min
34
Shots
26

| 17 January 2013; 13:00 | Belgium | 2–25 (0–4, 1–10, 1–11) | Estonia | Pionir Ice Hall, Belgrade; Attendance: 50 |

Game reference

Maarten Vanthillo
Neil Bruyninckx
Goalies
Erik Gudnov
Aleksei Arno
Referee:
(Italy) Michele Gastaldelli
Linesmen:
(Finland) Markus Hagerstrom
(Serbia) David Parduv

| | 0–1 | 05:20 – S. Gruznov (P. Kulakov, M. Terna) |
| | 0–2 | 06:28 – M. Taru (K. Parras, J. Missenjov) |
| | 0–3 | 11:53 – P. Kulakov (S. Gruznov, K. Ljubobratets) (PP) |
| | 0–4 | 12:32 – R. Rooba (M. Taru, J. Missenjov) (PP) |
| | 0–5 | 21:10 – S. Kerna (R. Rooba, K. Parras) (PP) |
| | 0–6 | 22:05 – M. Tugo (A. Gurtovoi, G. Filippov) |
| | 0–7 | 25:48 – J. Missenjov (R. Rooba) |
| | 0–8 | 26:20 – A. Gurtovoi (A. Gornostajev, V. Zgritsa) |
| | 0–9 | 26:44 – M. Punger (M. Tugo, R.H. Russ) |
| | 0–10 | 27:49 – K. Parras (SH) |
| D. Swinnen (Y. de Smet) (PP) – 29:03 | 1–10 |
| | 1–11 | 30:31 – M. Taru (J. Missenjov, R. Rooba) |
| | 1–12 | 36:09 – A. Gornostajev (M. Terna, P. Kulakov) (PP) |
| | 1–13 | 38:07 – M. Taru (K. Parras, J. Missenjov) |
| | 1–14 | 39:43 – S. Gruznov (P. Kulakov, K. Ljubobratets) |
| | 1–15 | 42:00 – A. Gurtavoi (R.H. Russ, V. Zagritsa) |
| | 1–16 | 43:14 – K. ljubobratets (S. Kerna) (SH) |
| | 1–17 | 44:43 – A. Gornostajev (R.H. Russ, A. Gurtovoi) |
| | 1–18 | 46:42 – R. Rooba (J. Missenjov) |
| | 1–19 | 48:22 – K. Parras (R. Rooba, J. Missenjov) (PP) |
| | 1–20 | 49:06 – A. Gornostajev (M. Terna, S. Gruznov) (PP2) |
| | 1–21 | 49:59 – J. Missenjov (R. Rooba, M. Taru) (PP) |
| | 1–22 | 50:35 – R.H. Russ (A. Gornostajev, A. Gurovoi) |
| | 1–23 | 51:18 – M Punger |
| F. Neven (D. Swinnen) (PP) – 55:28 | 2–23 |
| | 2–24 | 57:05 – S. Gruznov (P. Kulakov) |
| | 2–25 | 57:49 – A. Gornostajev (R.H. Russ, A. Gurtovoi) |

20 min
Penalties
8 min
13
Shots
78

| 17 January 2013; 16:30 | Iceland | 1–5 (1–2, 0–2, 0–1) | South Korea | Pionir Ice Hall, Belgrade; Attendance: 47 |

Game reference

Einar Eyland
Goalies
Lee Yeonseung
Referee:
(Latvia) Aleksandrs Borisovs
Linesmen:
(Serbia) Uros Aleksic
(Czech Republic) Miroslav Lhotsky

| J. Leifsson (F. Gudnason) – 00:29 | 1–0 |
| | 1–1 | 16:26 – Yoon S.W. (Lee H.S., Shin S.) (PP) |
| | 1–2 | 19:25 – Shin S. (Lee J.) |
| | 1–3 | 32:41 – Shin S. (SH) |
| | 1–4 | 33:10 – Shin S. (Yoon S.W., Lee D.G.) |
| | 1–5 | 55:23 – Shin S. |

8 min
Penalties
10 min
14
Shots
49

| 17 January 2013; 20:00 | Australia | 3–1 (0–0, 2–0, 1–1) | Serbia | Pionir Ice Hall, Belgrade; Attendance: 700 |

Game reference

Fraser Carson
Goalies
Jovan Feher
Referee:
(Netherlands) Jean Paul DeBrabander
Linesmen:
(Spain) Rudy Meyer
(Netherlands) Jeroen ban den Berg

| D. Szalinski (M. Wong, C. Todd) – 25:42 | 1–0 |
| M. Stringer (A. McKenzie, M. Humphries) – 33:44 | 2–0 |
| | 2–1 | 55:13 – U. Novakovic (N. Kerezovic, N. Lazarevic) (PP2) |
| M. Humphries (M. Wong) (EN) – 59:45 | 3–1 |

14 min
Penalties
79 min
19
Shots
34

| 18 January 2013; 13:00 | South Korea | 3–8 (0–4, 2–2, 1–2) | Estonia | Pionir Ice Hall, Belgrade; Attendance: 63 |

Game reference

Lee Yeonseung
Kim Kweonyoung
Goalies
Aleksei Arno
Referee:
(Netherlands) Jean Paul DeBrander
Linesmen:
(Czech Republic) Miroslav Lhotsky
(Serbia) David Parduv

| | 0–1 | 06:09 – M. Taru (R. Rooba) |
| | 0–2 | 10:43 – S. Gruznov |
| | 0–3 | 13:59 – R. Rooba (K. Parras, S. Kerna) (PP) |
| | 0–4 | 15:50 – J. Missenjov (R. Rooba) (SH) |
| Park K. (Lee D.G.) (PP) – 20:25 | 1–4 |
| Shin S. (Yoon S.W.) – 22:28 | 2–4 |
| | 2–5 | 24:32 – R.H. Russ (A. Gurtovoi, A. Gornostajev) |
| | 2–6 | 27:57 – R. Rooba |
| | 2–7 | 41:17 – K. Parras (J. Missenjov, S. Kerna) (PP) |
| | 2–8 | 44:29 – S. Kerna (R. Rooba) |
| Lee D.G. (Yoon S.W.) – 54:50 | 3–8 |

83 min
Penalties
16 min
29
Shots
37

| 18 January 2013; 16:30 | Belgium | 3–5 (1–1, 0–2, 2–2) | Australia | Pionir Ice Hall, Belgrade; Attendance: 50 |

Game reference

Maarten Vanthillo
Goalies
Fraser Carson
Referee:
(Ukraine) Maksym Urda
Linesmen:
(Serbia) Uros Aleksic
(Netherlands) Jeroen van der Berg

| | 0–1 | 02:47 – A. McKenzie (M. Stringer, M. Humphries) |
| D. Swinnen (Y. de Smet) – 05:33 | 1–1 |
| | 1–2 | 28:08 – M. Humphries (T. Newmark, F. Carson) |
| | 1–3 | 35:31 – C. Todd (A. Stephenson, D. Szalinski) |
| D. Swinnen (Y. de Smet, F. Neven) (PP2) – 45:06 | 2–3 |
| D. Swinnen (Y. de Smet, S. McCann-Coppens) (PP) – 48:17 | 3–3 |
| | 3–4 | 57:18 – C. Todd (T. Newmark, D. Szalinski) |
| | 3–5 | 59:54 – J. Woodman (EN) |

10 min
Penalties
12 min
32
Shots
41

| 18 January 2013; 20:00 | Serbia | 7–1 (1–0, 4–1, 2–0) | Iceland | Pionir Ice Hall, Belgrade; Attendance: 996 |

Game reference

Peter Stepanovic
Goalies
Einar Eyland
Ati Valdimarsson
Referee:
(Italy) Michele Gataldelli
Linesmen:
(Finland) Markus Hagerstrom
(Spain) Rudy Meyer

| N. Kerezovic (D. Filipovic) (PP) – 19:55 | 1–0 |
| A. Babic (N. Lazarevic) (PP) – 22:14 | 2–0 |
| D. Filipovic (A. Zwick, D. Plavsic) | 3–0 |
| | 3–1 | 33:59 – J. Leifsson (I. Eliasson) |
| D. Plavsic (A. Zwick) (SH) – 38:24 | 4–1 |
| I. Uzelac (N. Lazarevic) (PP) – 39:25 | 5–1 |
| D. Plavsic (A. Zwick) (SH) – 42:44 | 6–1 |
| N. Kerezovic (D. Plavsic, A. Zwick) (PP) – 48:05 | 7–1 |

24 min
Penalties
32 min
28
Shots
25

=== Statistics ===
==== Top 10 scorers ====
| Pos | Player | Country | GP | G | A | Pts | +/- | PIM |
|---|---|---|---|---|---|---|---|---|
| 1 | Robert Rooba | Estonia | 5 | 7 | 14 | 21 | +16 | 4 |
| 2 | Artjom Gornostajev | Estonia | 5 | 10 | 7 | 17 | +16 | 4 |
| 3 | Stanislav Gruznov | Estonia | 5 | 9 | 5 | 14 | +8 | 2 |
| 3 | Shin Sanghoon | South Korea | 5 | 9 | 5 | 14 | +8 | 27 |
| 5 | Mark Taru | Estonia | 5 | 8 | 5 | 13 | +19 | 0 |
| 6 | Jevgeni Missenjov | Estonia | 4 | 6 | 7 | 13 | +15 | 0 |
| 7 | Anton Gurtovoi | Estonia | 5 | 5 | 8 | 13 | +15 | 4 |
| 8 | Yoon Sang Won | South Korea | 5 | 5 | 7 | 12 | +10 | 2 |
| 9 | Pavel Kulakov | Estonia | 5 | 2 | 10 | 12 | +9 | 0 |
| 10 | Dennis Swinnen | Belgium | 5 | 7 | 4 | 11 | −9 | 2 |

==== Goaltending leaders ====
(minimum 40% team's total ice time)

| Pos | Player | Country | MINS | GA | Sv% | GAA | SO |
|---|---|---|---|---|---|---|---|
| 1 | Aleksei Arno | Estonia | 220:00 | 4 | 93.44 | 1.09 | 0 |
| 2 | Fraser Carson | Australia | 199:30 | 12 | 90.08 | 3.61 | 0 |
| 3 | Peter Stepanovic | Serbia | 180:00 | 9 | 89.77 | 3.00 | 0 |
| 4 | Lee Yeonseung | South Korea | 163:10 | 7 | 88.89 | 2.57 | 0 |
| 5 | Neil Bruyninckx | Belgium | 191:46 | 18 | 87:92 | 5.63 | 0 |

=== Awards ===
==== Best Players Selected by the Directorate ====
- Goaltender: (Serbia) Peter Stepanovic
- Defenceman: (Estonia) Mark Taru
- Forward: (Estonia) Robert Rooba
