= Soviet Union men's national junior ice hockey team =

Soviet Union
- Most points: Pavel Bure (39)
- IIHF code: URS

First international
- Soviet Union 6-2 Finland (Leningrad, Soviet Union; December 27, 1973)

Biggest win
- Soviet Union 19-1 Austria (Augsburg, Germany; December 27, 1980)

Biggest defeat
- Canada 7-0 Soviet Union (Winnipeg, Manitoba; December 26, 1981

IIHF World U20 Championship
- Appearances: 15 (first in 1977)
- Best result: Gold: 8 (9) – (1977, 1978, 1979, 1980, 1983, 1984, 1986, 1989, 1992)

Medal record

IIHF World U20 Championship
Gold medal – first place	1977 Czechoslovakia	Soviet Union
Gold medal – first place	1978 Canada	Soviet Union
Gold medal – first place	1979 Sweden	Soviet Union
Gold medal – first place	1980 Finland	Soviet Union
Gold medal – first place	1983 Soviet Union	Soviet Union
Gold medal – first place	1984 Sweden	Soviet Union
Gold medal – first place	1986 Canada	Soviet Union
Gold medal – first place	1989 USA	Soviet Union
Gold medal – first place	1992 Germany	CIS
Silver medal – second place	1988 Soviet Union	Soviet Union
Silver medal – second place	1990 Finland	Soviet Union
Silver medal – second place	1991 Canada	Soviet Union
Bronze medal – third place	1981 West Germany	Soviet Union
Bronze medal – third place	1985 Finland	Soviet Union

The Soviet Union men's national under 20 ice hockey team was the national under-20 ice hockey team in the Soviet Union. The team represented the Soviet Union at the International Ice Hockey Federation's IIHF World U20 Championship. The team has won eleven gold medals (first three unofficial, once more as CIS), three silver medals, and two bronze medals at the World U20 Championships.

At the 1987 World Junior Ice Hockey Championships, the team was disqualified as a result of the Punch-up in Piestany versus the Canada men's national junior ice hockey team. Soviet administrator Yuri Korolev expressed regret that the incident occurred but did not admit any guilt. He felt that the game should have been finished instead of both teams being disqualified from the tournament.

== World Junior Championships ==
- 1974 – Gold (Unofficial tournament)
- 1975 – Gold (Unofficial tournament)
- 1976 – Gold (Unofficial tournament)
- 1977 – Gold
- 1978 – Gold
- 1979 – Gold
- 1980 – Gold
- 1981 – Bronze
- 1982 – 4th place
- 1983 – Gold
- 1984 – Gold
- 1985 – Bronze
- 1986 – Gold
- 1987 – Disqualified
- 1988 – Silver
- 1989 – Gold
- 1990 – Silver
- 1991 – Silver
- 1992 – Gold (as Commonwealth of Independent States)
