= 1985 World Junior Ice Hockey Championships =

1985 IIHF World U20 Championship
Tournament details
- Host country: Finland
- Venue(s): 4 (in 4 host cities)
- Dates: December 23, 1984 – January 1, 1985
- Teams: 8

Final positions
- Champions: Canada (2nd title)
- Runners-up: Czechoslovakia
- Third place: Soviet Union
- Fourth place: Finland

Tournament statistics
- Games played: 28
- Goals scored: 230 (8.21 per game)
- Attendance: 61,023 (2,179 per game)
- Scoring leader(s): (Finland) Esa Keskinen (20 points)

The 1985 World Junior Ice Hockey Championships (1985 WJHC) was the ninth edition of the Ice Hockey World Junior Championship and was held mainly in Turku and Helsinki, Finland. Canada won the gold medal, its second championship, Czechoslovakia silver and the Soviet Union bronze.

== Final standings ==
The 1985 tournament was a round-robin format, with the top three teams winning gold, silver and bronze medals respectively.

Pos	Team	Pld	W	L	D	GF	GA	GD	Pts
1	Canada	7	5	0	2	44	14	+30	12
2	Czechoslovakia	7	5	0	2	32	13	+19	12
3	Soviet Union	7	5	2	0	38	17	+21	10
4	Finland	7	4	1	2	42	20	+22	10
5	Sweden	7	3	4	0	32	26	+6	6
6	United States	7	2	5	0	23	37	−14	4
7	West Germany	7	0	6	1	9	44	−35	1
8	Poland	7	0	6	1	10	59	−49	1

Source: Hockey Canada

Poland was relegated to Pool B for 1986.

== Results ==
December 23, 1984	Canada	8 – 2	Sweden	Helsinki

December 23, 1984	Soviet Union	10 – 0	Poland	Vantaa

December 23, 1984	Finland	9 – 0	West Germany	Turku

December 23, 1984	Czechoslovakia	9 – 1	United States	Turku

December 25, 1984	Canada	12 – 1	Poland	Turku

December 25, 1984	Soviet Union	12 – 1	West Germany	Vantaa

December 25, 1984	Czechoslovakia	4 – 3	Sweden	Helsinki

December 25, 1984	Finland	7 – 4	United States	Turku

December 26, 1984	Canada	6 – 0	West Germany	Helsinki

December 26, 1984	Czechoslovakia	6 – 2	Poland	Espoo

December 26, 1984	Finland	5 – 3	Sweden	Turku

December 26, 1984	Soviet Union	4 – 2	United States	Turku

December 28, 1984	Canada	7 – 5	United States	Turku

December 28, 1984	Soviet Union	5 – 1	Sweden	Turku

December 28, 1984	Czechoslovakia	7 – 3	West Germany	Vantaa

December 28, 1984	Finland	11 – 2	Poland	Helsinki

December 29, 1984	Canada	5 – 0	Soviet Union	Turku

December 29, 1984	Sweden	11 – 0	Poland	Turku

December 29, 1984	Czechoslovakia	1 – 1	Finland	Helsinki

December 29, 1984	United States	2 – 1	West Germany	Helsinki

December 31, 1984	Finland	4 – 4	Canada	Helsinki

December 31, 1984	Sweden	5 – 1	West Germany	Turku

December 31, 1984	Czechoslovakia	3 – 1	Soviet Union	Turku

December 31, 1984	United States	6 – 2	Poland

January 1, 1985	Canada	2 – 2	Czechoslovakia	Helsinki

January 1, 1985	Poland	3 – 3	West Germany	Vantaa

January 1, 1985	Soviet Union	6 – 5	Finland	Helsinki

January 1, 1985	Sweden	7 – 3	United States	Vantaa

=== Scoring leaders ===
Rank	Player	Country	G	A	Pts
1	Esa Keskinen	Finland	6	14	20
2	Esa Tikkanen	Finland	7	12	19
3	Brian Bradley	Canada	9	5	14
4	Peter Andersson	Sweden	4	10	14
5	Mikko Mäkelä	Finland	11	2	13
6	Michal Pivoňka	Czechoslovakia	9	4	13
7	Adam Creighton	Canada	8	4	12
8	Sergei Novosyolov	Soviet Union	3	9	12
9	Alexander Semak	Soviet Union	7	4	11
10	Ravil Khaidarov	Soviet Union	6	3	9

=== Tournament awards ===
	IIHF Directorate Awards	Media All-Star Team
Goaltender	(Canada) Craig Billington	(Finland) Timo Lehkonen
Defencemen	(Finland) Vesa Salo	(Canada) Bobby Dollas (Soviet Union) Mikhail Tatarinov
Forwards	(Czechoslovakia) Michal Pivoňka	(Czechoslovakia) Michal Pivoňka (Finland) Esa Tikkanen (Finland) Mikko Mäkelä

== Pool B ==
Eight teams contested the second tier this year in Sapporo Japan from March 15 to 24. It was played in a simple round robin format, each team playing seven games.

Standings

Pos	Team	Pld	W	L	D	GF	GA	GD	Pts	Switzerland men's national junior ice hockey team	Netherlands men's national junior ice hockey team	Japan men's national junior ice hockey team	Austria men's national junior ice hockey team	Norway men's national junior ice hockey team	Italy men's national junior ice hockey team	Romania men's national junior ice hockey team	France men's national junior ice hockey team
1	Switzerland	7	7	0	0	58	22	+36	14		5–4	5–3	20–7	6–1	7–1	8–6	7–0
2	Netherlands	7	5	1	1	47	14	+33	11	4–5		4–4	8–1	5–1	7–1	7–1	12–1
3	Japan	7	4	2	1	34	23	+11	9	3–5	4–4		10–3	3–1	5–2	3–5	6–3
4	Austria	7	3	3	1	30	53	−23	7	7–20	1–8	3–10		5–5	3–2	7–6	4–2
5	Norway	7	2	4	1	23	28	−5	5	1–6	1–5	1–3	5–5		1–2	7–1	7–6
6	Italy	7	2	5	0	14	28	−14	4	1–7	1–7	2–5	2–3	2–1		5–3	1–2
7	Romania	7	1	5	1	27	42	−15	3	6–8	1–7	5–3	6–7	1–7	3–5		5–5
8	France	7	1	5	1	19	42	−23	3	0–7	1–12	3–6	2–4	6–7	2–1	5–5	

Switzerland was promoted to Pool A and France was relegated to Pool C for 1986.

== Pool C ==
This tournament took place in Belgium from February 22 to 27. It was played in Brussels, Heist-op-den-Berg, Liège, Geel, Deurne and Antwerp.

Standings

Pos	Team	Pld	W	L	D	GF	GA	GD	Pts	Bulgaria men's national junior ice hockey team	Hungary men's national junior ice hockey team	Belgium men's national junior ice hockey team	Denmark men's national junior ice hockey team	Great Britain men's national junior ice hockey team	Spain men's national junior ice hockey team
1	Bulgaria	5	5	0	0	28	17	+11	10		3–2	11–9	5–1	4–1	5–4
2	Hungary	5	4	1	0	35	12	+23	8	2–3		6–1	10–2	11–2	6–4
3	Belgium	5	2	2	1	32	27	+5	5	9–11	1–6		5–5	11–1	6–4
4	Denmark ^{[A]}	5	2	2	1	20	24	−4	5	1–5	2–10	5–5		8–1	4–3
5	Great Britain	5	1	4	0	10	37	−27	2	1–4	2–11	1–11	1–8		5–3
6	Spain	5	0	5	0	18	26	−8	0	4–5	4–6	4–6	3–4	3–5	

Bulgaria was promoted to Pool B for 1986.

A. While Total Hockey lists Denmark in their standings, passionhockey.com states that this was a Netherlands team that does not count in the standings. The IIHF encyclopedia does not include Denmark in the 1985 standings.
