= IIHF World U20 Championship Division II =

Annual ice hockey tournament

- Upcoming season or competition: 2027 IIHF U20 World Championship Division II
- Formerly: C-series (1983–2000)
- Sport: Ice hockey
- Founded: 1983 (C-series); 2001 (Division II)
- No. of teams: 12
- Promotion to: Division I
- Relegation to: Division III
- Website: IIHF.com

The IIHF World U20 Championship Division II is played every year among the ice hockey teams under the age of 20 who were placed in Division II in the previous year.

Until 2001 the tournament was known as the C-series.

== Results ==
Year	Promoted		Relegated	
Year	To IIHF U20 Division I	To Division II A	To Division II B	To IIHF U20 Division III
2001	Slovenia	–	–	Estonia
2002	Japan, Denmark, Latvia, Croatia	–	–	No relegated team
2003	Estonia, Hungary	–	–	Bulgaria, Mexico
2004	Poland, Great Britain	–	–	Iceland, South Africa
2005	Japan, Hungary	–	–	Lithuania, Belgium
2006	Great Britain, Estonia	–	–	New Zealand, China
2007	Hungary, Lithuania	–	–	Australia, Serbia
2008	Italy, Estonia	–	–	Iceland, China
2009	Japan, Croatia	–	–	New Zealand,
2010	Great Britain, Lithuania	–	–	Mexico, Serbia
2011	France, Poland	–	–	Iceland, China
2012	Ukraine	Romania	South Korea	Mexico
2013	Japan	Estonia	Spain	Belgium
2014	Hungary	South Korea	Croatia	China
2015	Great Britain	Croatia	Romania	Iceland
2016	Hungary	Romania	South Korea	China
2017	Lithuania	South Korea	Croatia	Australia
2018	Japan	Spain	Netherlands	Turkey
2019	Estonia	Serbia	South Korea	Mexico
2020	Japan	South Korea	Serbia	Israel
2021	Cancelled due to the COVID-19 pandemic.			
2022	Italy, South Korea	Croatia, Netherlands	No relegated team	No relegated team
2023	Croatia	China	Romania	Mexico
2024	South Korea	Romania	Spain	Chinese Taipei
2025	Lithuania	Spain	Netherlands	Belgium
2026	South Korea	Netherlands	Spain	Iceland

== Pool C ==
=== Results (1983–2000) ===
Year	National team
1983	Romania
1984	Italy
1985	Bulgaria
1986	France
1987	Yugoslavia
1988	Denmark
1989	Austria
1990	Netherlands
1991	North Korea
1992	Italy
1993	Ukraine
1994	Slovakia
1995	Latvia
1996	Kazakhstan
1997	Belarus
1998	Denmark
1999	Italy
2000	Austria
