= 2016 World Junior Ice Hockey Championships – Division II =

International ice hockey tournament

2016 IIHF U20 World Championship Division II

Tournament details
- Host countries: Lithuania; Serbia
- Venue(s): 2 (in 2 host cities)
- Dates: 13–19 December 2015; 17–23 January 2016
- Teams: 12

The 2016 IIHF Ice Hockey U20 World Championship Division II was a pair of international ice hockey tournaments organized by the International Ice Hockey Federation. Division II A was contested in Elektrėnai, Lithuania and Division II B in Novi Sad, Serbia. These tournaments represent the fourth and fifth tiers of the World Junior Ice Hockey Championships.

== Division II A ==
2016 IIHF U20 World Championship Division II A
Tournament details
- Host country: Lithuania
- City: Elektrėnai
- Venue(s): 1 (in 1 host city)
- Dates: 13–19 December 2015
- Teams: 6

Tournament statistics
- Games played: 15
- Goals scored: 123 (8.2 per game)
- Attendance: 14,464 (964 per game)
- Scoring leader(s): (Hungary) Vilmos Galló (Estonia) Vadim Vasjonkin (13 points)

Official website
- www.iihf.com

The Division II A tournament was played in Elektrėnai, Lithuania, from 13 to 19 December 2015.

=== Participating teams ===
Team	Qualification
Hungary	Placed 6th in Division I B last year and were relegated.
Lithuania	Hosts; placed 2nd in Division II A last year.
South Korea	Placed 3rd in Division II A last year.
Netherlands	Placed 4th in Division II A last year.
Estonia	Placed 5th in Division II A last year.
Croatia	Placed 1st in Division II B last year and were promoted.

=== Final standings ===
Pos	Team	Pld	W	OTW	OTL	L	GF	GA	GD	Pts	Promotion or relegation
1	Hungary	5	5	0	0	0	36	9	+27	15	Promoted to the 2017 Division I B
2	Lithuania (H)	5	3	1	0	1	18	16	+2	11	
3	Estonia	5	3	0	0	2	27	26	+1	9	
4	Croatia	5	2	0	0	3	13	21	−8	6	
5	Netherlands	5	0	1	0	4	14	23	−9	2	
6	South Korea	5	0	0	2	3	15	28	−13	2	Relegated to the 2017 Division II B

Source: IIHF
Rules for classification: 1) points; 2) head-to-head points; 3) head-to-head goal difference; 4) head-to-head number of goals scored; 5) result against closest best-ranked team outside tied teams; 6) result against second-best ranked team outside tied teams; 7) seeding before tournament.
(H) Host

=== Match results ===
All times are local (Eastern European Time – UTC+2).

13 December 2015; 13:00	Croatia	5–2 (1–0, 3–0, 1–2)	Netherlands	Elektrėnai Ice Palace, Elektrėnai; Attendance: 304

Game reference

Vilim Rosandic
Goalies
Ruud Leeuwestiejn
Referee:
(Belgium) Chris Deweerdt
Linesmen:
(Lithuania) Deividas Kuneikis
(Romania) Adrian Toparceanu

Pavicevic (Puzic, Matija Milicic) (PP) – 08:44	1–0
Jarcov (Puzic, Milicic) (SH) – 26:26	2–0
Krnic (Plesko, Jovic) – 28:42	3–0
Boric (Smolec) (PP) – 38:28	4–0
	4–1	49:39 – Lambregts (van Nes, Nordemann) (PP)
Jarcov (SH) – 50:48	5–1
	5–2	55:30 – Nordemann (Lambregts, van Nes) (PP)

22 min
Penalties
10 min
39
Shots
30

13 December 2015; 16:30	South Korea	2–8 (0–2, 1–2, 1–4)	Hungary	Elektrėnai Ice Palace, Elektrėnai; Attendance: 1001

Game reference

Kim Donghyun
Yang Heetae
Goalies
Gergely Arany
Referee:
(Belarus) Andrei Shrubok
Linesmen:
(Lithuania) Benas Jaksys
(Sweden) Ludvig Lundgren

	0–1	12:45 – Kiss (Voklar, Terbocs)
	0–2	13:23 – Gallo (Jaszai)
	0–3	33:06 – Erdely (Sagi) (PP)
Lee C. (Kim Y.) (PP) – 38:08	1–3
	1–4	39:43 – Erdely (Gallo, Jaszai)
	1–5	42:10 – Gallo (Szita)
	1–6	45:06 – Keresztury (Erdely, Gallo)
	1–7	45:14 – Szaller (Bodok)
	1–8	49:44 – Bodok (Kiss, Terbocs)
Kim B. (Nam) (PP) – 55:47	2–8

14 min
Penalties
20 min
23
Shots
38

13 December 2015; 20:00	Lithuania	6–5 (2–1, 2–1, 2–3)	Estonia	Elektrėnai Ice Palace, Elektrėnai; Attendance: 1816

Game reference

Artur Pavliukov
Goalies
Daniil Seppenen
Referee:
(Slovenia) Milan Zrnic
Linesmen:
(Belgium) Frederic Monnaie
(Kazakhstan) Roman Voronin

Protcenko (PP) – 03:17	1–0
	1–1	09:50 – Fursa (Kozorev, Vasjonkin) (PP2)
Vitte (I. Cetvertak) (PP) – 16:07	2–1
Kaleinikova (Bogdziul, Jasinevicius) – 20:58	3–1
	3–2	22:24 – Simonov (Minin, Jogi)
I. Cetvertak (SH) – 39:54	4–2
E. Krakauskas (Bogdziul) – 48:27	5–2
	5–3	49:51 – Arrak (Nestertsuk, Petrov) (PP)
	5–4	51:10 – Petrov (Vinogradov) (PP)
I. Cetvertak – 54:56	6–4
	6–5	59:52 – Vasjonkin (Kozorev, Smirnov) (PP, EA)

46 min
Penalties
62 min
36
Shots
34

14 December 2015; 13:00	Hungary	7–5 (1–2, 4–3, 2–0)	Netherlands	Elektrėnai Ice Palace, Elektrėnai; Attendance: 317

Game reference

Gergely Arany
Bence Kiss
Goalies
Bart van Gorp
Referee:
(Japan) Shinichi Takizawa
Linesmen:
(China) Liu Ren
(Belgium) Frederic Monnaie

	0–1	01:29 – Smit (Vogelaar, Boer)
	0–2	11:03 – van Nes (Verkiel)
Erdely (Jaszai, Stipsicz) – 15:14	1–2
	1–3	22:09 – Smit
Szita (Herner, Mazzag) – 22:36	2–3
Terbocs (Z. Kiss) – 23:49	3–3
	3–4	26:55 – Nordemann (van Nes) (PP)
Terbocs (Jaszai, Bodok) – 28:35	4–4
Gallo (Herner, Keresztury) (PP) – 37:53	5–4
	5–5	38:52 – Verkiel (Lambregts)
Bodok (Szaller, Vokla) – 40:52	6–5
Erdely (Garat, Gallo) – 42:04	7–5

12 min
Penalties
12 min
58
Shots
8

14 December 2015; 16:30	Estonia	6–3 (0–0, 4–1, 2–1)	Croatia	Elektrėnai Ice Palace, Elektrėnai; Attendance: 416

Game reference

Daniil Seppenen
Goalies
Vilim Rosandic
Ivan Ruzic
Referee:
(Belarus) Andrei Shrubok
Linesmen:
(Lithuania) Benas Jaksys
(Lithuania) Deividas Kuneikis

Simonov (Nestertsuk) – 23:10	1–0
	1–1	24:14 – Smolec (Gjoni)
Arrak (Teppan, Vinogradov) (PP) – 35:17	2–1
Vasjonkin (Fursa) – 38:33	3–1
Nestertsuk (Vinogradov, Novikov) – 38:46	4–1
	4–2	40:09 – Jarcov (Trstenjak)
Vasjonkin (Sinikas, Vinogradov) (PP) – 45:03	5–2
Minin (Andrejev) (ENG) – 53:47	6–2
	6–3	58:23 – Platuzic (Stancic)

10 min
Penalties
32 min
28
Shots
39

14 December 2015; 20:00	Lithuania	2–1 GWS (0–1, 0–0, 1–0) (OT: 0–0) (SO: 4–3)	South Korea	Elektrėnai Ice Palace, Elektrėnai; Attendance: 1795

Game reference
Artur Pavliukov	Goalies	Kim Donghyun; Yang Heetae	Referee: (Belgium) Chris Deweerdt; Linesmen: (Sweden) Ludvig Lundgren (Romania) Adrian Toparceanu
/ 0–1 / 16:45 – Song; Kaleinikovas (Jasinevicius) (PP) – 45:10 / 1–1			Referee: (Belgium) Chris Deweerdt; Linesmen: (Sweden) Ludvig Lundgren (Romania) Adrian Toparceanu
Protcenko (miss); I. Cetvertak (miss); Kaleinikovas; I. Cetvertak (miss); Kaleinikovas; Protcenko; Kaleinikovas	Shootout	(miss) Kim Y. Choi Ji. (miss) Nam; (miss) Kim B. Choi Ji. Kim Y. (miss) Kim Y.	Referee: (Belgium) Chris Deweerdt; Linesmen: (Sweden) Ludvig Lundgren (Romania) Adrian Toparceanu
10 min	Penalties	12 min	Referee: (Belgium) Chris Deweerdt; Linesmen: (Sweden) Ludvig Lundgren (Romania) Adrian Toparceanu
23	Shots	28	Referee: (Belgium) Chris Deweerdt; Linesmen: (Sweden) Ludvig Lundgren (Romania) Adrian Toparceanu

16 December 2015; 13:00	Hungary	6–0 (3–0, 1–0, 2–0)	Estonia	Elektrėnai Ice Palace, Elektrėnai; Attendance: 271

Game reference

Gergely Arany
Goalies
Daniil Seppenen
Referee:
(Belgium) Chris Deweerdt
Linesmen:
(Lithuania) Deividas Kuneikis
(Romania) Adrian Toparceanu

Stipsicz (Vizi) (SH) – 07:22	1–0
Bodok (Terbocs) – 10:20	2–0
Bodok (Jaszai, Stipsicz) (PP) – 19:05	3–0
Keresztury – 21:08	4–0
Erdely (Keresztury) – 40:32	5–0
Kiss (Bodok, Stipsicz) (PP) – 45:26	6–0

8 min
Penalties
12 min
51
Shots
20

16 December 2015; 16:30	South Korea	2–3 GWS (1–0, 1–1, 0–1) (OT: 0–0) (SO: 1–2)	Netherlands	Elektrėnai Ice Palace, Elektrėnai; Attendance: 361

Game reference

Kim Donghyun
Goalies
Ruud Leeuwesteijn
Referee:
(Slovenia) Milan Zrnic
Linesmen:
(Sweden) Ludvig Lundgren
(Kazakhstan) Roman Voronin

Kim Y. (Lee C.) (PP) – 14:11	1–0
	1–1	27:21 – Lemans (Beeren, de Bonth)
Kim Y. (PP) – 36:33	2–1
	2–2	52:03 – Vogelaar (Kluijtmans)

Lee C.
Kim Y. (miss)
Choi Ji. (miss)
Shootout
(miss) Verkiel
Vogelaar
van Nes
2 min
Penalties
14 min
35
Shots
14

16 December 2015; 20:00	Lithuania	4–1 (0–0, 2–1, 2–0)	Croatia	Elektrėnai Ice Palace, Elektrėnai; Attendance: 1922

Game reference

Artur Pavliukov
Goalies
Vilim Rosandic
Referee:
(Japan) Shinichi Takizawa
Linesmen:
(China) Liu Ren
(Belgium) Frederic Monnaie

E. Krakauskas (Bogdziul) – 27:46	1–0
I. Cetvertak (Vitte, Boroska) – 28:48	2–0
	2–1	39:44 – Kegalj (Gjoni)
D. Cetvertak (Bazys, Benilov) – 45:17	3–1
Jasinevicius (SH, ENG) – 57:57	4–1

8 min
Penalties
8 min
29
Shots
30

18 December 2015; 13:00	Estonia	11–8 (5–3, 3–4, 3–1)	South Korea	Elektrėnai Ice Palace, Elektrėnai; Attendance: 189

Game reference

Daniil Seppenen
Goalies
Yang Heetae
Kim Donghyun
Referee:
(Japan) Shinichi Takizawa
Linesmen:
(Lithuania) Deividas Kuneikis
(Sweden) Ludvig Lundgren

	0–1	05:47 – Song (Lee C.) (PP2)
Vinogradov (Arrak, Teppan) (PP) – 07:37	1–1
Kozorev (Vasjonkin) – 07:52	2–1
Andrejev (Vinogradov) – 08:54	3–1
	3–2	09:40 – Lee C. (Cho J., Song)
	3–3	16:31 – Jaein (Choi W.)
Arrak (Sinikas) – 16:51	4–3
Vasjonkin (Fursa, Kozorev) – 17:53	5–3
Vasjonkin (Kozorev, Slessarevski) – 20:38	6–3
	6–4	24:58 – Cho J. (Lee C., Shin)
Kozorev (Vasjonkin) (PP) – 26:42	7–4
Vinogradov (Nesterstuk) – 36:14	8–4
	8–5	37:38 – Ahn (Lee Je., Choi W.)
	8–6	38:12 – Kim Y. (Cho J.)
	8–7	39:54 – Nam (Kim Y.)
Kozorev (Fursa, Vasjonkin) – 40:19	9–7
	9–8	43:39 – Kim Y. (Cho J., Lee C.)
Vasjonkin – 50:05	10–8
Kozorev (Sinikas) (ENG) – 59:01	11–8

8 min
Penalties
8 min
29
Shots
45

18 December 2015; 16:30	Croatia	0–7 (0–3, 0–2, 0–2)	Hungary	Elektrėnai Ice Palace, Elektrėnai; Attendance: 561

Game reference

Ivan Ruzic
Goalies
Gergely Arany
Bence Kiss
Referee:
(Slovenia) Milan Zrnic
Linesmen:
(Lithuania) Benas Jaksys
(China) Liu Ren

0–1	07:36 – Szaller (Z. Kiss)
0–2	11:00 – Erdely (Terbocs, Herner) (PP2)
0–3	17:22 – Szita (Gallo, Stipsicz)
0–4	31:24 – Keresztury (Gallo, Terbocs) (PP)
0–5	32:37 – Z. Kiss (Terbocs)
0–6	46:23 – Gallo (Erdely, Jaszai)
0–7	50:50 – Gallo (Vizi)

16 min
Penalties
8 min
14
Shots
58

18 December 2015; 20:00	Netherlands	1–4 (0–1, 0–1, 1–2)	Lithuania	Elektrėnai Ice Palace, Elektrėnai; Attendance: 2103

Game reference

Ruud Leeuwesteijn
Goalies
Artur Pavliukov
Referee:
(Belarus) Andrei Shrubok
Linesmen:
(Belgium) Frederic Monnaie
(Kazakhstan) Roman Voronin

	0–1	15:04 – Kaleinikovas (Bogdziul, Protcenko) (PP)
	0–2	22:55 – D. Cetvertak (V. Krakauskas, Protcenko)
	0–3	46:44 – Boroska (Vitte)
van Nes (Vogelaar, Nordemann) (PP) – 47:29	1–3
	1–4	49:15 – Protcenko (Boroska, E. Krakauskas) (PP)

16 min
Penalties
18 min
33
Shots
29

19 December 2015; 13:00	South Korea	2–4 (1–3, 1–0. 0–1)	Croatia	Elektrėnai Ice Palace, Elektrėnai; Attendance: 226

Game reference

Kim Donghyun
Goalies
Vilim Rosandic
Referee:
(Belarus) Andrei Shrubok
Linesmen:
(Lithuania) Benas Jaksys
(Kazakhstan) Roman Voronin

Kim B. (Choi W., Ahn) – 07:41	1–0
	1–1	09:03 – Gjoni (Stancic)
	1–2	12:53 – Jarcov (Platuzic, Gjoni) (PP)
	1–3	13:30 – Gjoni (Stancic)
Song (Lee Je.) — 39:03	2–3
	2–4	59:56 – Jarcov (ENG)

10 min
Penalties
24 min
26
Shots
30

19 December 2015; 16:30	Netherlands	3–5 (1–1, 1–2, 1–1)	Estonia	Elektrėnai Ice Palace, Elektrėnai; Attendance: 721

Game reference

Bart van Gorp
Goalies
Daniil Seppenen
Referee:
(Japan) Shinichi Takizawa
Linesmen:
(China) Liu Ren
(Romania) Adrian Toparceanu

Giovanni Vogelaar (Beeren) (PP) – 10:35	1–0
	1–1	17:08 – Daniil Fursa (Kozorev, Vasjonkin)
	1–2	25:55 – Nestertsuk (Vinogradov)
Nordemann (Vogelaar, Verkiel) (PP) – 33:22	2–2
	2–3	34:51 – Fursa (Vasjonkin) (PP)
Evers (Kluijtmans) – 46:47	3–3
	3–4	50:20 – Minin (Arrak)
	3–5	59:58 – Vinogradov (Arrak, Vasjonkin) (ENG)

2 min
Penalties
8 min
28
Shots
32

19 December 2015; 20:00	Hungary	8–2 (1–1, 4–0, 3–1)	Lithuania	Elektrėnai Ice Palace, Elektrėnai; Attendance: 2461

Game reference

Gergely Arany
Goalies
Artur Pavliukov
Referee:
(Belgium) Chris Deweerdt
Linesmen:
(Sweden) Ludvig Lundgren
(Belgium) Frederic Monnaie

Keresztury (Gallo) – 12:31	1–0
	1–1	14:57 – V. Krakauskas (Bazys)
Erdely (Gallo) – 20:30	2–1
Erdely (Gallo) – 26:20	3–1
Terbocs (Szaller) (PP) – 32:51	4–1
Terbocs (Kiss) – 35:20	5–1
	5–2	44:12 – D. Cetvertak (PP)
Gallo (Terbocs) – 45:03	6–2
Kiss (Jaszai) – 48:50	7–2
Sagi (Antal) – 59:30	8–2

4 min
Penalties
4 min
39
Shots
13

=== Statistics ===
==== Top 10 scorers ====
Pos	Player	Country	GP	G	A	Pts	+/-	PIM
1	Vilmos Gallo	Hungary	5	6	7	13	+14	2
1	Vadim Vasjonkin	Estonia	5	6	7	13	+4	10
3	Csanad Erdely	Hungary	5	8	3	11	+10	6
4	Istvan Terbocs	Hungary	5	4	7	11	+10	6
5	Nikita Kozorev	Estonia	4	4	6	10	+2	25
6	Kim Yeajun	South Korea	5	4	5	9	-2	4
7	Dmitri Vinogradov	Estonia	5	3	6	9	0	2
8	Zsombor Kiss	Hungary	5	4	4	8	+10	0
9	Lee Chonghyun	South Korea	5	2	6	8	-2	4
10	David Jaszai	Hungary	5	0	8	8	+11	2

==== Goaltending leaders ====
(minimum 40% team's total ice time)

Pos	Player	Country	MINS	GA	Sv%	GAA	SO
1	Gergely Arany	Hungary	257:51	6	91.55	1.40	1
2	Artur Pavliukov	Lithuania	305:00	16	90.24	3.15	0
3	Vilim Rosandic	Croatia	219:56	11	89.42	3.00	0
4	Ruud Leeuwesteijn	Netherlands	185:00	11	89.32	3.57	0
5	Daniil Seppenen	Estonia	298:00	26	86.93	5.23	0

=== Awards ===
==== Best Players Selected by the Directorate ====
- Goaltender: (Lithuania) Artur Pavliukov
- Defenceman: (Lithuania) Domanatas Cypas
- Forward: (Hungary) Vilmos Gallo

== Division II B ==
2016 IIHF U20 World Championship Division II B
Tournament details
- Host country: Serbia
- City: Novi Sad
- Venue(s): 1 (in 1 host city)
- Dates: 17–23 January 2016
- Teams: 6

Tournament statistics
- Games played: 15
- Goals scored: 136 (9.07 per game)
- Attendance: 2,436 (162 per game)
- Scoring leader(s): (Romania) Norbert Rokaly (19 points)

Official website
- www.iihf.com

The Division II B tournament was played in Novi Sad, Serbia, from 17 to 23 January 2016.

=== Participating teams ===
Team	Qualification
Romania	Placed 6th in the Division II A last year and were relegated.
Spain	Placed 2nd in Division II B last year.
Australia	Placed 3rd in Division II B last year.
Belgium	Placed 4th in Division II B last year.
Serbia	Hosts; placed 5th in Division II B last year.
China	Placed 1st in Division III last year and were promoted.

=== Final standings ===
Pos	Team	Pld	W	OTW	OTL	L	GF	GA	GD	Pts	Promotion or relegation
1	Romania	5	4	1	0	0	37	14	+23	14	Promoted to the 2017 Division II A
2	Spain	5	4	0	0	1	34	12	+22	12	
3	Serbia (H)	5	3	0	1	1	34	9	+25	10	
4	Belgium	5	2	0	0	3	14	21	−7	6	
5	Australia	5	1	0	0	4	11	35	−24	3	
6	China	5	0	0	0	5	6	45	−39	0	Relegated to the 2017 Division III

Source: IIHF
Rules for classification: 1) points; 2) head-to-head points; 3) head-to-head goal difference; 4) head-to-head number of goals scored; 5) result against closest best-ranked team outside tied teams; 6) result against second-best ranked team outside tied teams; 7) seeding before tournament.
(H) Host

=== Match results ===
All times are local (Central European Time – UTC+1).

17 January 2016; 13:00	Australia	0–8 (0–2, 0–4, 0–2)	Romania	SPC Vojvodina, Novi Sad; Attendance: 35

Game reference

Alex Tetreault
Stephen McCann
Goalies
Attila Adorjan
Referee:
(France) Geoffrey Barcelo
Linesmen:
(Netherlands) Louis Beelen
(South Korea) Chae Youngjin

0–1	10:11 – Gajdo (Grigori)
0–2	18:34 – S. Rokaly (N. Rokaly, Creanga) (PP)
0–3	21:21 – Sandor (Szopos, Gyorgy)
0–4	27:13 – S. Rokaly (N. Rokaly, Orban)
0–5	27:22 – Gyorgy (Creanga, Gyorfy)
0–6	35:39 – Gereb (S. Rokaly, N. Rokaly)
0–7	44:19 – N. Rokaly (S. Rokaly, Gyorgy)
0–8	55:46 – Ferencz-Csibi (N. Rokaly) (PP)

14 min
Penalties
10 min
13
Shots
45

17 January 2016; 16:30	China	0–5 (0–2, 0–2, 0–1)	Belgium	SPC Vojvodina, Novi Sad; Attendance: 47

Game reference

Li Qiuyang
Goalies
Keanu Evers
Referee:
(Italy) Andrea Benvegnu
Linesmen:
(Serbia) Tibor Fazekas
(Ukraine) Anton Gladchenko

0–1	00:38 – van Rooy
0–2	09:30 – Denis (van Espen) (PP2)
0–3	20:21 – Goris (van Rooy)
0–4	38:45 – Franckx (Tambeur) (PP)
0–5	59:17 – van Rooy (Coolen, Goris)

14 min
Penalties
12 min
19
Shots
52

17 January 2016; 20:30	Spain	4–1 (0–0, 1–0, 3–1)	Serbia	SPC Vojvodina, Novi Sad; Attendance: 623

Game reference

Ignacio GarcÍa
Alejandro Reneses
Goalies
Peter Stepanovic
Referee:
(Kazakhstan) Sergei Sobolev
Linesmen:
(Croatia) Marko Sakovic
(Hungary) David Vaczi

Granell (Arrinda, Palacios) – 31:15	1–0
A. García (Cerdá) – 44:22	2–0
	2–1	44:33 – Boskovic (Djumic)
Pantoja (Hernández) – 48:28	3–1
Pantoja (Rubio) (ENG) – 59:51	4–1

14 min
Penalties
8 min
16
Shots
35

18 January 2016; 13:00	Romania	6–2 (1–0, 2–0, 3–2)	Belgium	SPC Vojvodina, Novi Sad; Attendance: 32

Game reference

Attila Adorjan
Goalies
Keanu Evers
Referee:
(Croatia) Vedran Krcelic
Linesmen:
(Ukraine) Anton Gladchenko
(Croatia) Marko Sakovic

Gyorgy (Szopos) – 14:03	1–0
Gereb (S. Rokaly) (PP) – 27:30	2–0
Sandor (Gyorfy, Gereb) – 38:36	3–0
S. Rokaly (N. Rokaly, Gyorfy) (PP) – 45:45	4–0
	4–1	46:07 – Denis (van Espen)
Gereb (Sandor) – 48:15	5–1
	5–2	53:21 – Goris (van Rooy)
Gyorgy (Ferencz-Csibi) – 58:42	6–2

4 min
Penalties
16 min
36
Shots
34

18 January 2016; 16:30	Spain	9–3 (4–1, 4–1, 1–1)	Australia	SPC Vojvodina, Novi Sad; Attendance: 42

Game reference

Ignacio García
Goalies
Alex Tetreault
Stephen McCann
Referee:
(Italy) Andrea Benvegnu
Linesmen:
(Serbia) David Parduv
(Hungary) David Vaczi

Granell (Arrinda, Rubio) – 04:30	1–0
	1–1	06:55 – Hodic (Lodge) (PP)
Lasuen (Cerdá, Paul) – 07:57	2–1
Arrinda (Ruiz) (PP) – 13:04	3–1
Granell (Arrinda, Rubio) – 18:03	4–1
Granell (Rubio, Vicente) (PP2) – 27:11	5–1
Hernández (A. García, Ruiz) (PP) – 27:37	6–1
	6–2	31:16 – C. Kubara
Palacios (Pantoja, Vicente) (PP) – 35:01	7–2
Baldris (Paul) – 35:45	8–2
	8–3	46:55 – Hodic (Pataky) (PP2)
Rubio (Ruiz) – 51:37	9–3

28 min
Penalties
22 min
54
Shots
20

18 January 2016; 20:00	Serbia	10–0 (3–0, 5–0, 2–0)	China	SPC Vojvodina, Novi Sad; Attendance: 178

Game reference

Jovan Feher
Goalies
Li Qiuyang
Referee:
(France) Geoffrey Barcelo
Linesmen:
(Netherlands) Louis Beelen
(South Korea) Chae Youngjin

Anic (Bjelgrlic, Podunavac) (PP) – 07:20	1–0
Bjelogrlic (Boskovic, Nikolic) (SH) – 13:27	2–0
P. Novakovic (Djumic, Vukicevic) (PP) – 17:38	3–0
Djumic (Pajic, P. Novakovic) – 21:38	4–0
Glavonjic (Djumic, Anic) (SH) – 26:18	5–0
Glavonjic (Lestaric, Podunavac) – 27:57	6–0
Lestaric (Podunavac, Anic) – 32:23	7–0
Podunavac (Bjelogrlic, Lestaric) – 38:51	8–0
Lestaric (Bjelogrlic, Anic) – 40:10	9–0
Lestaric (Glavonjic, Bjelogrlic) – 45:23	10–0

28 min
Penalties
26 min
69
Shots
13

20 January 2016; 13:00	Spain	10–1 (3–0, 3–1, 4–0)	China	SPC Vojvodina, Novi Sad; Attendance: 25

Game reference

Alejandro Reneses
Goalies
Chen Xi
Referee:
(Croatia) Vedran Krcelic
Linesmen:
(South Korea) Chae Youngjin
(Hungary) David Vaczi

Rubio (Granell) (PP) – 07:22	1–0
Baldris (Hernández) (SH) – 10:32	2–0
Pantoja (Manero, Vicente) – 12:13	3–0
	3–1	23:29 – Guo (Huang, Song) (PP)
Granell (Hernández) – 28:44	4–1
Pantoja (Granell, Palacios) (PP) – 32:41	5–1
Vicente (Palacios, Pantoja) (PP) – 36:54	6–1
Manero (Pantoja) – 49:45	7–1
Burgos (Manero, Baldris) – 52:11	8–1
G. Torner (A. Torner) – 54:20	9–1
Arrinda (Rubio, Baldris) – 59:58	10–1

12 min
Penalties
14 min
75
Shots
17

20 January 2016; 16:30	Australia	0–6 (0–1, 0–3, 0–2)	Belgium	SPC Vojvodina, Novi Sad; Attendance: 38

Game reference

Alex Tetreault
Goalies
Keanu Evers
Referee:
(Kazakhstan) Sergei Sobolev
Linesmen:
(Serbia) Tibor Fazekas
(Serbia) David Parduv

0–1	04:15 – Swenne (Tambeur)
0–2	23:11 – Delbrassine (Tambeur)
0–3	36:23 – Tambeur (Denis)
0–4	38:37 – Laan (Janssen, Goris) (PP)
0–5	42:26 – Steyaert (Denis, Auger)
0–6	48:06 – van Rooy (Goris, Denis)

12 min
Penalties
30 min
13
Shots
47

20 January 2016; 20:00	Romania	5–4 OT (2–1, 0–1, 2–2) (OT: 1–0)	Serbia	SPC Vojvodina, Novi Sad; Attendance: 576

Game reference

Attila Adorjan
Goalies
Peter Stepnovic
Referee:
(Italy) Andrea Benvegnu
Linesmen:
(Ukraine) Anton Gladchenko
(Croatia) Marko Sakovic

Gereb (Sandor, Gyorfy) (PP) – 01:20	1–0
Gyorgy (N. Rokaly) – 13:47	2–0
	2–1	18:58 – Glavonjic (Lestaric, Boskovic)
	2–2	23:49 – Djumic (SH)
N. Rokaly (SH) – 42:08	3–2
	3–3	47:01 – Glavonjic (SH)
S. Rokaly (N. Rokaly, Gyorgy) – 54:34	4–3
	4–4	56:01 – Pajic (Boskovic) (PP)
S. Rokaly (N. Rokaly) – 63:45	5–4

18 min
Penalties
47 min
31
Shots
40

21 January 2016; 13:00	Belgium	1–6 (1–2, 0–2, 0–2)	Spain	SPC Vojvodina, Novi Sad; Attendance: 37

Game reference

Keanu Evers
Goalies
Ignacio Garcia
Referee:
(France) Geoffrey Barcelo
Linesmen:
(Ukraine) Anton Gladchenko
(Serbia) David Parduv

	0–1	06:33 – Rubio (Baldris, I. García)
	0–2	06:53 – Hernández (Cerdá, Lasuen)
Laan (Goris, van Rooy) (PP) – 12:17	1–2
	1–3	29:44 – Pantoja (Vicente, Rubio)
	1–4	34:04 – Rubio (Palacios, Pantoja) (PP)
	1–5	44:19 – Hernández (Cerdá) (PP)
	1–6	59:02 – Hernández (Arraras, Lasuen)

8 min
Penalties
28 min
29
Shots
40

21 January 2016; 16:30	China	3–12 (1–3, 0–8, 2–1)	Romania	SPC Vojvodina, Novi Sad; Attendance: 26

Game reference

Li Qiuyang
Chen Xi
Goalies
Daniel Uruc
Referee:
(Kazakhstan) Sergei Sobolev
Linesmen:
(Serbia) Tibor Fazekas
(Croatia) Marko Sakovic

	0–1	01:38 – Kollo (Sandor)
He (Zuo) – 11:24	1–1
	1–2	14:47 – Vasile (Antal)
	1–3	16:36 – Sandor (Szopos)
	1–4	22:17 – Gyorgy (Szopos) (PP)
	1–5	25:38 – Ferencz-Csibi
	1–6	26:02 – Gyorgy (Szopos)
	1–7	32:32 – Gajdo (Antal, Vasile) (PP)
	1–8	34:10 – N. Rokaly (S. Rokaly, Creanga)
	1–9	36:24 – S. Rokaly (N. Rokaly) (SH)
	1–10	37:25 – Gyorgy (S. Rokaly)
	1–11	39:12 – Gyorgy (PP)
Ma (Xie) – 41:03	2–11
Guo (Huang) – 42:57	3–11
	3–12	57:42 – N. Rokaly (SH)

12 min
Penalties
8 min
17
Shots
53

21 January 2016; 20:00	Serbia	10–0 (6–0, 3–0, 1–0)	Australia	SPC Vojvodina, Novi Sad; Attendance: 223

Game reference

Jovan Feher
Goalies
Stephen McCann
Alex Tetreault
Referee:
(Croatia) Vedran Krcelic
Linesmen:
(Netherlands) Louis Beelen
(Hungary) David Vaczi

Pajic (Boskovic, Nikolic) (PP) – 04:35	1–0
Markovic (L. Novakovic) – 08:05	2–0
Vukicevic (Pajic) – 11:25	3–0
Glavonjic – 12:26	4–0
Terzic (Bjelogrlic, Djumic) (PP) – 17:18	5–0
Glavonjic (Bjelogrlic) – 18:44	6–0
Terzic (Pajic, Boskovic) – 23:38	7–0
Nikolic (Djumic, Bjelogrlic) – 30:42	8–0
Djumic (Pajic, Anic) – 32:32	9–0
Djumic (Bjelgrlic, Glavonjic) – 48:12	10–0

22 min
Penalties
16 min
43
Shots
22

23 January 2016; 13:00	Australia	8–2 (3–0, 1–2, 4–0)	China	SPC Vojvodina, Novi Sad; Attendance: 29

Game reference

Alex Tetreault
Goalies
Chen Xi
Li Qiuyang
Referee:
(Italy) Andrea Benvegnu
Linesmen:
(Serbia) Tibor Fazekas
(Hungary) David Vaczi

Carini (Pataky) – 02:14	1–0
Lodge (PP) – 03:40	2–0
C. Kubara (Hodic)	3–0
	3–1	23:11 – Guo (Huang)
Lodge – 28:46	4–1
	4–2	33:43 – Guo (Han)
C. Kubara (Carini) – 43:50	5–2
McGuiness (Lodge) – 47:15	6–2
Hodic (Boyle) (SH) – 49:07	7–2
Boyle (C. Kubara) – 52:39	8–2

39 min
Penalties
26 min
42
Shots
23

23 January 2016; 16:30	Romania	6–5 (2–1, 1–1, 3–3)	Spain	SPC Vojvodina, Novi Sad; Attendance: 83

Game reference

Attila Adorjan
Goalies
Ignacio Garcia
Referee:
(Kazakhstan) Sergei Sobolev
Linesmen:
(Netherlands) Louis Beelen
(Serbia) David Parduv

Gereb (N. Rokaly, S. Rokaly) – 03:05	1–0
N. Rokaly – 05:15	2–0
	2–1	16:04 – Pantoja (Vicente, Rubio) (PP2)
Gereb (Ferencz-Csibi, N. Rokaly) (PP) – 20:54	3–1
	3–2	38:06 – Rubio (Cerda)
	3–3	43:04 – Rubio (A. Garcia, Cerda) (PP)
	3–4	46:39 – Pantoja (Rubio)
Sandor (Gyorgy) – 51:05	4–4
	4–5	51:25 – Palacios (PP)
Gereb (Ferencz-Csibi, N. Rokaly) – 52:11	5–5
Sandor (N. Rokaly, Gyorgy) (PP2) – 56:29	6–5

18 min
Penalties
20 min
32
Shots
25

23 January 2016; 20:30	Belgium	0–9 (0–2, 0–3, 0–4)	Serbia	SPC Vojvodina, Novi Sad; Attendance: 442

Game reference

Keanu Evers
Goalies
Petar Stepanovic
Referee:
(France) Geoffrey Barcelo
Linesmen:
(South Korea) Chae Youngjin
(Croatia) Marko Sakovic

0–1	12:34 – Bjelogrlic (Glavonjic) (PP)
0–2	16:59 – Djumic (Glavonjic)
0–3	27:03 – Glavonjic (Anic, Vukicevic)
0–4	29:06 – Djumic (Podunavac)
0–5	33:34 – Boskovic (Nikolic, Pajic)
0–6	42:42 – Nikolic (Terzic, Vukicevic)
0–7	52:14 – Glavonjic (Djumic)
0–8	55:02 – Glavonjic (Djumic, Anic) (PP)
0–9	57:12 – Vukicevic

8 min
Penalties
12 min
17
Shots
40

=== Statistics ===
==== Top 10 scorers ====
Pos	Player	Country	GP	G	A	Pts	+/-	PIM
1	Norbert Rokaly	Romania	5	5	14	19	+12	0
2	Oriol Rubio	Spain	5	6	8	14	+10	0
3	Mirko Djumic	Serbia	5	6	7	13	+11	29
4	Ivan Glavonjic	Serbia	5	9	3	12	+15	0
5	Robert Gyorgy	Romania	5	7	5	12	+9	10
6	Szilard Rokaly	Romania	5	6	6	12	+12	6
7	Pablo Pantoja	Spain	5	7	4	11	+6	4
8	Uros Bjelogrlic	Serbia	5	2	8	10	+10	22
9	Zoltan Sandor	Romania	5	6	2	8	+5	0
10	Ivan Anic	Serbia	5	1	7	8	+11	0

==== Goaltending leaders ====
(minimum 40% team's total ice time)

Pos	Player	Country	MINS	GA	Sv%	GAA	SO
1	Ignacio Garcia	Spain	239:31	11	90.52	2.76	0
2	Attila Adorjan	Romania	243:45	11	90.18	2.71	1
3	Petar Stepanovic	Serbia	182:30	8	87.30	2.63	1
4	Keanu Evers	Belgium	300:00	21	85.81	4.20	2
5	Chen Xi	China	135:33	18	84.87	7.97	0

=== Awards ===
==== Best Players Selected by the Directorate ====
- Goaltender: (Spain) Ignacio Garcia
- Defenceman: (Serbia) Stefan Boskovic
- Forward: (Spain) Pablo Pantoja
