= 2017 World Junior Ice Hockey Championships – Division II =

International ice hockey tournament

2017 IIHF U20 World Championship Division II

Tournament details
- Host countries: Estonia; Spain
- Venues: 2 (in 2 host cities)
- Dates: 11–17 December 2016; 7–13 January 2017
- Teams: 12

The 2017 IIHF Ice Hockey U20 World Championship Division II was a pair of international ice hockey tournaments organized by the International Ice Hockey Federation. Division II A was contested in Tallinn, Estonia and Division II B in Logroño, Spain. These tournaments represent the fourth and fifth tiers of the World Junior Ice Hockey Championships.

== Division II A ==
2017 IIHF U20 World Championship Division II A
Tournament details
- Host country: Estonia
- City: Tallinn
- Venue: 1 (in 1 host city)
- Dates: 11–17 December 2016
- Teams: 6

Tournament statistics
- Games played: 15
- Goals scored: 136 (9.07 per game)
- Attendance: 3,570 (238 per game)
- Scoring leader: (Lithuania) Emilijus Krakauskas (15 points)

Official website
- www.iihf.com

The Division II A tournament was played in Tallinn, Estonia, from 11 to 17 December 2016.

=== Participating teams ===
Team	Qualification
Japan	withdrew from Division I B last year and were relegated
Lithuania	placed 2nd Division II A last year
Estonia	hosts; placed 3rd in Division II A last year
Croatia	placed 4th in Division II A last year
Netherlands	placed 5th in Division II A last year
Romania	placed 1st in Division II B last year and were promoted

=== Final standings ===
Pos	Team	Pld	W	OTW	OTL	L	GF	GA	GD	Pts	Promotion or relegation
1	Lithuania	5	5	0	0	0	42	10	+32	15	Promoted to the 2018 Division I B
2	Japan	5	4	0	0	1	35	13	+22	12	
3	Romania	5	2	0	1	2	21	29	−8	7	
4	Estonia (H)	5	2	0	0	3	18	24	−6	6	
5	Netherlands	5	1	0	0	4	9	24	−15	3	
6	Croatia	5	0	1	0	4	11	36	−25	2	Relegated to the 2018 Division II B

Source: IIHF
Rules for classification: 1) points; 2) head-to-head points; 3) head-to-head goal difference; 4) head-to-head number of goals scored; 5) result against closest best-ranked team outside tied teams; 6) result against second-best ranked team outside tied teams; 7) seeding before tournament.
(H) Host

=== Match results ===
All times are local (Eastern European Time – UTC+2).

11 December 2016; 13:00	Romania	3–4 GWS (0–1, 3–0, 0–2) (OT: 0–0) (SO: 0–2)	Croatia	Tondiraba Ice Hall, Tallinn; Attendance: 105

Game reference

Daniel Uruc
Ors Adorjan
Goalies
Vito Nikolić
Referee:
(Slovenia) Miha Bulovec
Linesmen:
(Iceland) Sindri Gunnarsson
(Estonia) Toivo Tilku

	0–1	06:36 – Cizmadija (Smolec)
Rokaly (Reszegh, Gyorfy) – 26:52	1–1
Sándor (Gajdo, R. Marton) – 29:06	2–1
Szopos (Reszegh, Rokaly) – 34:18	3–1
	3–2	50:31 – Smolec
	3–3	53:05 – Trstenjak (Krikšić)

Szopos (miss)
Reszegh (miss)
Shootout
Smolec
(miss) Ficur
Kopricanec
4 min
Penalties
4 min
30
Shots
31

11 December 2016; 16:30	Estonia	2–6 (1–2, 0–0, 1–4)	Japan	Tondiraba Ice Hall, Tallinn; Attendance: 249

Game reference

Bogdan Valjaikin
Goalies
Yuuki Mizuta
Referee:
(United Kingdom) Dean Smith
Linesmen:
(Finland) Timo Heinonen
(Netherlands) Chris van Grinsven

Smirnov (Petrov) (PP) – 05:06	1–0
	1–1	10:13 – Nakayashiki (Ishikura) (PP)
	1–2	17:32 – Tokoro (Ishikura, Shimizu)
	1–3	40:58 – Saito (W. Matsui, Kon)
	1–4	49:12 – Ikeda (Tokuda) (PP)
	1–5	56:58 – Saito (Sawade, Kon) (PP)
Kuznetsov (Jurgens, Ermel) – 58:06	2–5
	2–6	59:30 – H. Matsui (Watanabe, Tokuda) (PP)

16 min
Penalties
10 min
18
Shots
38

11 December 2016; 20:00	Lithuania	5–0 (2–0, 1–0, 2–0)	Netherlands	Tondiraba Ice Hall, Tallinn; Attendance: 167

Game reference

Artur Pavliukov
Goalies
Ruud Leeuwesteijn
Referee:
(Italy) Alex Lazzeri
Linesmen:
(Estonia) Anton Semjonov
(Slovakia) Malus Stanzel

Misiuk (Ragas) – 07:45	1–0
Kaleinikovas (Bogdziul, Boroska) – 10:04	2–0
Kraskauskas (Cetvertak, Kuzminov) – 38:14	3–0
Bogdziul (Boroska, Jonuska) – 41:46	4–0
Ragas (Domeika, Zukauskas) – 49:46	5–0

10 min
Penalties
4 min
44
Shots
18

12 December 2016; 13:00	Japan	11–2 (5–1, 3–0, 3–1)	Croatia	Tondiraba Ice Hall, Tallinn; Attendance: 108

Game reference

Yujiro Isobe
Goalies
Vito Nikolić
Leon Junker Djurić
Referee:
(Belgium) Tim Tzirtziganis
Linesmen:
(Estonia) Toivo Tilku
(Netherlands) Chris van Grinsven

Nakayashiki (Watanabe, Ikeda) (PP) – 09:01	1–0
	1–1	11:45 – Canić (Cizmadija)
Igari – 12:30	2–1
Namae (Yasuda, Igari) – 15:13	3–1
W. Matsui (Kon, Saito) (PP) – 16:19	4–1
Ikeda (Ishikura) – 17:15	5–1
Saito (Kon) – 21:06	6–1
Koba (Kawaguchi) – 31:50	7–1
Ikeda (Nakayashiki) – 36:33	8–1
	8–2	42:03 – Smolec (PP)
Namae (Igari) – 45:20	9–2
Tokoro (Shimizu, Ishikura) – 46:13	10–2
Shimizu (Ishikura, H. Matsui) – 54:10	11–2

6 min
Penalties
8 min
72
Shots
18

12 December 2016; 16:30	Netherlands	2–6 (1–1, 0–2, 1–3)	Romania	Tondiraba Ice Hall, Tallinn; Attendance: 175

Game reference

Ruud Leeuwesteijn
Goalies
Ors Adorjan
Referee:
(United Kingdom) Dean Smith
Linesmen:
(Iceland) Sindri Gunnarsson
(Estonia) Anton Semjonov

Hermens (Kluijtmans, De Bonth) – 09:47	1–0
	1–1	14:24 – Reszegh (Szopos, Rokaly)
	1–2	24:54 – Sandor (Ferencz-Csibi)
	1–3	31:06 – Vasile (Gajdo, Creanga)
	1–4	42:26 – Creanga (Ferencz-Csibi, Antal)
De Bonth (Hermans, Muller) – 47:07	2–4
	2–5	53:29 – Rokaly (Reszegh, Ferencz-Csibi)
	2–6	57:41 – Reszegh (Rokaly, Gyorfy) (PP)

14 min
Penalties
14 min
23
Shots
48

12 December 2016; 20:00	Lithuania	7–1 (1–1, 2–0, 4–0)	Estonia	Tondiraba Ice Hall, Tallinn; Attendance: 527

Game reference

Artur Pavliukov
Goalies
Bogdan Valjaikin
Referee:
(Slovenia) Miha Bulovec
Linesmen:
(Czech Republic) Josef Spur
(Slovakia) Malus Stanzel

Krakauskas (Jonuska) – 03:30	1–0
	1–1	06:57 – Nestertsuk
Kaleinikovas (Bogdziul) – 26:45	2–1
Krakauskas (Laukaitis) – 32:50	3–1
Misiuk (Protcenko) – 46:14	4–1
Bogdziul (Boroska (PP) – 53:57	5–1
Laukaitis (Cetvertak, Protcenko) – 55:26	6–1
Bogdziul (Protcenko, Motiejunas) – 59:17	7–1

10 min
Penalties
16 min
38
Shots
30

14 December 2016; 13:00	Japan	7–2 (1–0, 1–0, 5–2)	Netherlands	Tondiraba Ice Hall, Tallinn; Attendance: 98

Game reference

Yuuki Mizuta
Goalies
Jorrit Vos
Referee:
(Italy) Alex Lazzeri
Linesmen:
(Iceland) Sindri Gunnarsson
(Finland) Timo Heinonen

Sawade (Saito) – 16:16	1–0
H. Matsui (Ikeda) – 25:36	2–0
Sawade (W. Matsui, Saito) – 41:04	3–0
Ikeda (Nakayashiki) – 42:34	4–0
Tokuda (Nakayshiki, Watanabe) – 44:53	5–0
Tokuda (Watanabe, Ikeda) – 48:56	6–0
	6–1	49:36 – Geurts (Willems, Lambregts)
Sawade (SH) – 55:16	7–1
	7–2	58:47 – De Bonth

37 min
Penalties
8 min
43
Shots
11

14 December 2016; 16:30	Lithuania	11–5 (3–1, 6–2, 2–2)	Romania	Tondiraba Ice Hall, Tallinn; Attendance: 143

Game reference

Artur Pavliukov
Goalies
Daniel Uruc
Ors Adorjan
Referee:
(Belgium) Tim Tzirtziganis
Linesmen:
(Estonia) Anton Semjonov
(Slovakia) Matus Stanzel

Misiuk (Zukauskas) – 01:45	1–0
	1–1	02:11 – Rokaly (Reszegh, Otto Szopos)
Krakauskas (Cetvertak, Laukaitis) – 06:15	2–1
Krakauskas (Cetvertak) (PP) – 18:53	3–1
Krakauskas (Laukaitis, Cetvertak) – 24:07	4–1
Boroska (Bogdziul) – 24:19	5–1
Boroska (PP) – 26:55	6–1
	6–2	28:28 – Reszegh (Rokaly, Gyorfy) (PP)
Krakauskas (Mukovoz) – 29:55	7–2
	7–3	31:20 – Gajdo (Rokaly)
Mukovoz (Kuzminov, Kudrevicius) – 33:39	8–3
Kuzminov (Mukovoz, Kudrevicius) – 37:57	9–3
Misiuk (Zukauskas) – 43:42	10–3
Jonuska (Cetvertak, Krakauskas) (PP) – 48:13	11–3
	11–4	56:54 – Rokaly (Reszegh, Szopos)
	11–5	59:47 – Rokaly (Szopos, K. Marton) (PP)

12 min
Penalties
8 min
45
Shots
30

14 December 2016; 20:00	Estonia	6–3 (1–1, 1–0, 4–2)	Croatia	Tondiraba Ice Hall, Tallinn; Attendance: 385

Game reference

Daniil Erport
Goalies
Vito Nikolić
Referee:
(United Kingdom) Dean Smith
Linesmen:
(Czech Republic) Josef Spur
(Belgium) Chris van Grinsven

Nestertsuk (Sinikas, Kuznetsov) – 07:57	1–0
	1–1	11:53 – Canić (Ficur)
Nestertsuk (Simonov, Barancukov) – 24:26	2–1
Kozorev (Fursa, Arrak) – 43:41	3–1
	3–2	43:56 – Crnec
	3–3	48:05 – Vuglac (Vrbancić)
Arrak (Kozorev, Petrov) (PP) – 51:36	4–3
Sverdlov (Simonov, Sinikas) (PP) – 55:08	5–3
Smirnov (Fursa, Barancukov) (PP) – 56:50	6–3

8 min
Penalties
26 min
57
Shots
17

16 December 2016; 13:00	Croatia	0–13 (0–7, 0–4, 0–2)	Lithuania	Tondiraba Ice Hall, Tallinn; Attendance: 189

Game reference

Leon Junker Djurić
Goalies
Artur Pavliukov
Referee:
(Slovenia) Miha Bulovec
Linesmen:
(Iceland) Sindri Gunnarsson
(Estonia) Anton Semjonov

0–1	04:20 – Kaleinikovas (Bogdziul) (PP)
0–2	05:02 – Protcenko (Laukaitis, Krakauskas) (PP)
0–3	09:10 – Krakauskas (Gusevas) (PP)
0–4	12:50 – Cetvertak (Protcenko, Laukaitis) (PP)
0–5	15:11 Misiuk (Cetvertak) (SH)
0–6	18:07 – Cetvertak (Laukaitis) (PP)
0–7	18:34 – Kudrevicius (Kuzminov, Mukovoz)
0–8	24:33 – Kaleinikovas (Bogdziul, Boroska)
0–9	27:45 – Kaleinikovas (Bogdziul, Boroska)
0–10	29:40 – Cetvertak (Laukaitis, Krukovski)
0–11	31:38 – Cetvertak (Krakauskas, Gusevas)
0–12	55:57 – Laukaitis (Krukovski, Cetvertak)
0–13	56:20 – Boroska (Bogdziul)

32 min
Penalties
6 min
19
Shots
43

16 December 2016; 16:30	Romania	1–7 (1–2, 0–2, 0–3)	Japan	Tondiraba Ice Hall, Tallinn; Attendance: 108

Game reference

Ors Adorjan
Goalies
Yujiro Isobe
Referee:
(United Kingdom) Dean Smith
Linesmen:
(Czech Republic) Josef Spur
(Estonia) Toivo Tilku

	0–1	01:06 – Tokuda (Ikeda, H. Matsui)
Vasile (Timaru, Gajdo) – 05:49	1–1
	1–2	10:54 – Tokoro (Ishikura)
	1–3	30:32 – Kon (Saito, Igari)
	1–4	32:00 – Tokoro (Shimizu, Kawaguchi)
	1–5	49:11 – Namae (Koba, W. Matsui)
	1–6	53:58 – W. Matsui (Yasuda)
	1–7	56:13 – Tokuda (W. Matsui, Ikeda)

6 min
Penalties
16 min
23
Shots
40

16 December 2016; 20:00	Netherlands	2–4 (0–1, 1–3, 1–0)	Estonia	Tondiraba Ice Hall, Tallinn; Attendance: 427

Game reference

Ruud Leeuwesteijn
Goalies
Daniil Erport
Referee:
(Italy) Alex Lazzeri
Linesmen:
(Finland) Timo Heinonen
(Belgium) Chris van Grinsven

	0–1	04:32 – Kororev (Fursa, Arrak) (PP)
Tjin-A-Ton (Willems, Muller) (PP) – 22:21	1–1
	1–2	24:55 – Slessarevski (Jurgens) (SH)
	1–3	32:06 – Volkov (Sverdlov)
	1–4	34:00 – Smirnov (Nestertsuk)
Hermens (PS) – 54:39	2–4

10 min
Penalties
12 min
23
Shots
40

17 December 2016; 13:00	Japan	4–6 (2–2, 1–2, 1–2)	Lithuania	Tondiraba Ice Hall, Tallinn; Attendance: 363

Game reference

Yujiro Isobe
Yuuki Mizuta
Goalies
Artur Pavliukov
Referee:
(Slovenia) Miha Bulovec
Linesmen:
(Czech Republic) Josef Spur
(Belgium) Chris van Grinsven

Ikeda (H. Matsui, Nakayashiki) – 02:57	1–0
Sawade (Saito) (PP) – 09:32	2–0
	2–1	12:03 – Gusevas (Bogdziul)
	2–2	12:38 – Krakauskas (Protcenko, Laukaitis) (PP)
	2–3	20:33 – Krakauskas (Protcenko, Krukovski)
	2–4	22:52 – Krakauskas
Saito – 27:28	3–4
	3–5	46:45 – Laukaitis (Cetvertak, Krakauskas) (PP)
	3–6	59:17 – Bogdziul (Kaleinikovas, Boroska) (ENG)
Igari (Iwamura, Tokuda) – 59:57	4–6

22 min
Penalties
6 min
26
Shots
31

17 December 2016; 16:30	Croatia	2–3 (2–1, 0–2, 0–0)	Netherlands	Tondiraba Ice Hall, Tallinn; Attendance: 98

Game reference

Vito Nikolić
Goalies
Ruud Leeuwesteijn
Referee:
(Belgium) Tim Tzirtziganis
Linesmen:
(Slovakia) Matus Stanzel
(Estonia) Toivo Tilku

Krikšić (Ficur) – 07:24	1–0
Paulović (Smolec) – 07:46	2–0
	2–1	12:22 – Willems (Muller, T. van Soest) (PP)
	2–2	36:02 – T. van Soest (Hermens, De Bonth)
	2–3	39:49 – T. van Soest (Hermens, Muller)

10 min
Penalties
8 min
34
Shots
33

17 December 2016; 20:00	Estonia	5–6 (1–2, 4–1, 0–3)	Romania	Tondiraba Ice Hall, Tallinn; Attendance: 428

Game reference

Daniil Erport
Goalies
Daniel Uruc
Ors Adorjan
Referee:
(Italy) Slex Lazzeri
Linesmen:
(Iceland) Sindri Gunnarsson
(Finland) Timo Heinonen

	0–1	15:50 – Creanga (Kollo, Sandor)
	0–2	15:59 – Szopos (Reszegh, Rokaly)
Nestertsuk (Petrov, Sverdlov) – 18:10	1–2
	1–3	23:15 – Reszegh (Szopos, Antal)
Nestertsuk (Simonov) – 24:15	2–3
Arrak (Fursa, Petrov) – 31:55	3–3
Jurgens (Fursa, Arrak) – 34:03	4–3
Nestertsuk (Simonov) (SH) – 39:29	5–3
	5–4	40:47 – Sandor (Antal, Rokaly)
	5–5	55:44 – Reszegh (Sandor)
	5–6	56:16 – Gajdo (R. Marton, Creanga)

6 min
Penalties
6 min
46
Shots
41

=== Statistics ===
==== Top 10 scorers ====
Pos	Player	Country	GP	G	A	Pts	+/-	PIM
1	Emilijus Krakauskas	Lithuania	5	11	4	15	+10	2
2	Ilja Cetvertak	Lithuania	5	4	9	13	+11	0
3	Szilard Rokaly	Romania	5	5	7	12	+3	4
4	Dominik Bogdziul	Lithuania	5	4	8	12	+7	2
5	Tamas Reszegh	Romania	5	5	6	11	+4	0
6	Arturas Laukaitis	Lithuania	5	3	8	11	+9	4
7	Atsuki Ikeda	Japan	5	5	5	10	+5	2
8	Daichi Saito	Japan	5	4	5	9	+6	4
9	Edvinas Boroska	Lithuania	5	3	6	9	+5	0
10	Vladimir Nestertsuk	Estonia	5	6	1	7	+3	2

source:IIHF

==== Goaltending leaders ====
(minimum 40% team's total ice time)

Pos	Player	Country	MINS	GA	Sv%	GAA	SO
1	Yujiro Isobe	Japan	156:48	4	92.59	1.53	0
2	Artur Pavliukov	Lithuania	300:00	10	91.87	2.00	2
3	Ruud Leeuwesteijn	Netherlands	238:41	17	89.76	4.27	0
4	Vito Nikolić	Croatia	220:02	19	88.62	5.18	0
5	Daniil Erport	Estonia	179:01	11	86.42	3.69	0

source:IIHF

=== Awards ===
==== Best Players Selected by the Directorate ====
- Goaltender: (Lithuania) Artur Pavliukov
- Defenceman: (Japan) Yusuke Kon
- Forward: (Lithuania) Emilijus Krakauskas

== Division II B ==
2017 IIHF U20 World Championship Division II B
Tournament details
- Host country: Spain
- City: Logroño
- Venue: 1 (in 1 host city)
- Dates: 7–13 January 2017
- Teams: 6

Tournament statistics
- Games played: 15
- Goals scored: 125 (8.33 per game)
- Attendance: 3,217 (214 per game)
- Scoring leader: (Spain) Oriol Rubio (11 points)

Official website
- www.iihf.com

The Division II B tournament was played in Logroño, Spain, from 7 to 13 January 2017.

=== Participating teams ===
Team	Qualification
South Korea	placed 6th in the Division II A last year and were relegated
Spain	hosts; placed 2nd in Division II B last year
Serbia	placed 3rd in Division II B last year
Belgium	placed 4th in Division II B last year
Australia	placed 5th in Division II B last year
Mexico	placed 1st in Division III last year and were promoted

=== Final standings ===
Pos	Team	Pld	W	OTW	OTL	L	GF	GA	GD	Pts	Promotion or relegation
1	South Korea	5	4	1	0	0	27	7	+20	14	Promoted to the 2018 Division II A
2	Spain (H)	5	4	0	0	1	38	12	+26	12	
3	Serbia	5	3	0	1	1	23	12	+11	10	
4	Belgium	5	2	0	0	3	15	19	−4	6	
5	Mexico	5	0	1	0	4	13	39	−26	2	
6	Australia	5	0	0	1	4	9	36	−27	1	Relegated to the 2018 Division III

Source: IIHF
Rules for classification: 1) points; 2) head-to-head points; 3) head-to-head goal difference; 4) head-to-head number of goals scored; 5) result against closest best-ranked team outside tied teams; 6) result against second-best ranked team outside tied teams; 7) seeding before tournament.
(H) Host

=== Match results ===
All times are local (Central European Time – UTC+1).

7 January 2017; 13:00	Mexico	3–5 (1–2, 1–1, 1–2)	Belgium	Pista de Hielo Lobete, Logroño; Attendance: 100

Game reference

Sebastian de la Vega
Goalies
Seppe Stroobants
Bruce Hallewaert
Referee:
(Latvia) Andreis Kudrjasovs
Linesmen:
(Spain) Sergio Biec
(Denmark) Kenneth Nielsen

	0–1	05:49 – Ramet
	0–2	11:26 – De Croock (Janssen)
Pérez (Pierce, Bermejo) (PP) – 12:58	1–2
	1–3	31:24 – Op de Beeck (Delmarche, Vriendt)
Urbano (Bermejo) – 35:44	2–3
Perez (Pierce) (PP) – 51:28	3–3
	3–4	56:06 – De Croock (Klijsen) (PP)
	3–5	59:09 – Klijsen (Laan, Ramet)

20 min
Penalties
55 min
27
Shots
39

7 January 2017; 16:30	Serbia	2–3 GWS (0–0, 1–1, 1–1) (OT: 0–0) (SO: 0–2)	South Korea	Pista de Hielo Lobete, Logroño; Attendance: 120

Game reference

Jug Mitić
Goalies
Shim Hyounseop
Referee:
(Germany) Rainer Kottstorfer
Linesmen:
(Croatia) Tomislav Grozaj
(Spain) Carlos Trobajo

	0–1	37:23 – Kim Y. (Park H.)
Nikolić (Vukićević, Đumić) – 38:47	1–1
	1–2	40:45 – Lee Je. (Nam, Shin S.)
Podunavac – 58:06	2–2

Vukićević (miss)
Đumić (miss)
Shootout
Ahn
Lee H.
14 min
Penalties
16 min
27
Shots
49

7 January 2017; 20:00	Spain	15–2 (4–1, 8–1, 3–0)	Australia	Pista de Hielo Lobete, Logroño; Attendance: 570

Game reference

Lucas Serna
Goalies
Alex Tetreault
Stephen McCann
Referee:
(Switzerland) Joris Muller
Linesmen:
(Japan) Kensuke Kanazawa
(Lithuania) Vytautas Lukosevicius

Granell (Or. Rubio, Baldris) – 06:43	1–0
	1–1	06:56 – Webster (Lodge)
Os. Rubio (Burgos, Paul) – 09:40	2–1
Sanchez (Or. Rubio, Garcia) – 10:56	3–1
Royo (Monge) – 15:33	4–1
Or. Rubio (Granell, Garcia) (PP) – 20:32	5–1
Mendizabel – 21:25	6–1
Arraras (Baldris, Royo) – 25:39	7–1
	7–2	26:33 – Webster (Lodge, Ruck)
Os. Rubio (Burgos) – 26:55	8–2
Arraras (Baldris) (SH) – 32:58	9–2
Martin (Granell) – 36:25	10–2
Burgos (Gutierrez) – 38:48	11–2
Arraras (Monge) – 39:59	12–2
Os. Rubio – 40:49	13–2
Or. Rubio (Garcia) (PP) – 51:01	14–2
Puertolas (Royo) – 52:18	15–2

16 min
Penalties
14 min
54
Shots
13

8 January 2017; 13:00	South Korea	3–1 (1–0, 1–1, 1–0)	Belgium	Pista de Hielo Lobete, Logroño; Attendance: 80

Game reference

Shim Hyounseop
Goalies
Bruce Hallewaert
Referee:
(Ukraine) Olexander Govorun
Linesmen:
(Japan) Kensuke Kanazawa
(Spain) Carlos Trobajo

Lee H. (Choi W.) – 04:30	1–0
Lee H. (Nam, Park J.) – 25:06	2–0
	2–1	31:12 – Klijsen (Janssen) (PP)
Lee H. (Nam, Park J.) – 40:22	3–1

10 min
Penalties
12 min
44
Shots
24

8 January 2017; 16:30	Australia	5–6 OT (1–0, 3–3, 1–2) (OT: 0–1)	Mexico	Pista de Hielo Lobete, Logroño; Attendance: 86

Game reference

Alex Tetreault
Goalies
Sebastian de la Vega
Referee:
(Germany) Rainer Kottstorfer
Linesmen:
(Spain) Sergio Biec
(Romania) Botond Redai

Lodge (Webster) – 12:32	1–0
Ruck (Webster) – 20:39	2–0
	2–1	22:19 – Senties (Bermejo, Pérez)
	2–2	35:01 – Pérez (Najera, Pierce) (PP)
Stringer (Carini, Cornford) (PP) – 36:36	3–2
Carini (Cornford, Stringer) (PP) – 39:54	4–2
	4–3	39:54 – Cruz (Hagerman, Bermejo) (PP)
	4–4	44:33 – Najera (Benabib, Cruz)
Ruck (Lodge, Webster) – 45:09	5–4
	5–5	57:22 – Bermejo (Pierce) (PP)
	5–6	60:54 – Perez (Pierce, Bermejo)

12 min
Penalties
26 min
25
Shots
33

8 January 2017; 20:00	Spain	4–2 (2–1, 1–1, 1–0)	Serbia	Pista de Hielo Lobete, Logroño; Attendance: 460

Game reference

Lucas Serna
Goalies
Jug Mitić
Referee:
(Latvia) Andreis Kudrjasovs
Linesmen:
(Croatia) Tomislav Grozaj
(Denmark) Kenneth Nielsen

Or. Rubio (Baldris, Sánchez) – 08:11	1–0
Paul (Granell, Garcia) (PP) – 10:27	2–0
	2–1	16:55 – Đumić (Podunavac)
	2–2	33:46 – Vukićević
Burgos (Mendizabal, Baldris) (PP) – 37:50	3–2
Mendizabal (Baldris, Burgos) (PP) – 57:25	4–2

12 min
Penalties
14 min
44
Shots
23

10 January 2017; 13:00	South Korea	4–1 (1–0, 1–1, 2–0)	Australia	Pista de Hielo Lobete, Logroño; Attendance: 42

Game reference

Kim Tae-kyung
Goalies
Alex Tetreault
Referee:
(Latvia) Andreis Kudrjasovs
Linesmen:
(Spain) Sergio Biec
(Lithuania) Vytautas Lukosevicius

Lee S. (Kim Y.) – 13:00	1–0
Kim B. (Shim W.) – 27:02	2–0
	2–1	30:39 – Sillato (Lewis, Santilli)
Lee K. (Shin, Park H.) (PP) – 46:09	3–1
Lee Je. (Nam) (PP) – 52:16	4–1

12 min
Penalties
20 min
60
Shots
24

10 January 2017; 16:30	Serbia	6–1 (2–0, 3–1, 1–0)	Belgium	Pista de Hielo Lobete, Logroño; Attendance: 76

Game reference

Jug Mitić
Goalies
Bruce Hallewaert
Referee:
(Switzerland) Joris Muller
Linesmen:
(Romania) Botond Redai
(Spain) Carlos Trobajo

Vukićević (Đumić, Lestarić) – 05:23	1–0
Filipović – 17:54	2–0
	2–1	21:59 – De Croock (Janssen)
Đumić (Podunavac, Vukićević) – 24:35	3–1
Janković (Pajević, Španjević) – 25:43	4–1
Vukićević (Đumić) – 38:33	5–1
Vukićević (Lestaric) – 53:27	6–1

22 min
Penalties
10 min
26
Shots
25

10 January 2017; 20:00	Spain	10–0 (4–0, 3–0, 3–0)	Mexico	Pista de Hielo Lobete, Logroño; Attendance: 155

Game reference

Lucas Serna
Goalies
Gerardo García del Valle
Referee:
(Ukraine) Olexander Govorun
Linesmen:
(Japan) Kensuke Kanazawa
(Denmark) Kenneth Nielsen

Granell (Or. Rubio, Baldris) – 00:47	1–0
Os. Rubio (Granell, Baldris) (SH) – 11:21	2–0
Paul (Royo) – 12:51	3–0
Or. Rubio (Puertolas) – 18:12	4–0
Granell (PS) – 23:13	5–0
Arraras (Or. Rubio, Burgos) – 30:53	6–0
Burgos – 31:56	7–0
Burgos (Paul) – 54:05	8–0
Garcia (Mendizabal, Paul) (PP, EA) – 57:27	9–0
Muratet (Paul) – 59:35	10–0

26 min
Penalties
22 min
38
Shots
20

11 January 2017; 13:00	Australia	0–6 (0–2, 0–1, 0–3)	Serbia	Pista de Hielo Lobete, Logroño; Attendance: 48

Game reference

Alex Tetreault
Goalies
Jug Mitić
Referee:
(Ukraine) Olexander Govorun
Linesmen:
(Croatia) Tomislav Grozaj
(Spain) Carlos Trobajo

0–1	08:49 – Kastel (Živić)
0–2	16:28 – Lestarić (Đumić)
0–3	35:06 – Andjelković (Podunavac)
0–4	40:52 – Vukićević (Lestaric)
0–5	51:43 – Janković (Đumić, Nikolić)
0–6	53:27 – Lestaric (Podunavac) (PP)

6 min
Penalties
6 min
18
Shots
69

11 January 2017; 16:30	Mexico	0–12 (0–3, 0–6, 0–3)	South Korea	Pista de Hielo Lobete, Logroño; Attendance: 47

Game reference

Sebastian de la Vega
Gerardo García del Valle
Goalies
Shim Hyounseop
Kim Tae-kyung
Referee:
(Switzerland) Joris Muller
Linesmen:
(Spain) Sergio Biec
(Lithuania) Vytautas Lukosevicius

0–1	14:01 – Park H. (Nam, Choi W.) (PP)
0–2	16:49 – Kim B. (Choi W., Kim Y.)
0–3	17:17 – Park H. (Ahn)
0–4	20:24 – Nam (Park J., Ahn) (PP)
0–5	22:37 – Shim W.
0–6	23:49 – Park H. (Choi W., Park J.)
0–7	25:46 – Kim B. (Kim Y., Choi W.) (PP)
0–8	32:48 – Shin (Lee Je., Lee H.)
0–9	34:55 – Kim B. (Shim W.)
0–10	42:24 – Ryu (Kim D.)
0–11	45:03 – Ahn (Park H., Nam)
0–12	59:11 – Lee J .

16 min
Penalties
8 min
16
Shots
67

11 January 2017; 20:00	Belgium	3–6 (0–2, 0–3, 3–1)	Spain	Pista de Hielo Lobete, Logroño; Attendance: 180

Game reference

Seppe Stroobants
Goalies
Lucas Serna
Referee:
(Germany) Rainer Kottstorfer
Linesmen:
(Japan) Kensuke Kanazawa
(Romania) Botond Redai

	0–1	02:50 – Baldris (O'Hare, A. Martin)
	0–2	18:02 – Monge (Burgos, Baldris) (PP)
	0–3	25:58 – Monge (Baldris, Os. Rubio) (PP)
	0–4	28:37 – Granell (Arraras, Or. Rubio)
	0–5	37:00 – Arraras
Delmarche – 44:27	1–5
Versin (Tambeur, Klijsen) – 47:45	2–5
Delmarche (Kila, De Croock) – 49:07	3–5
	3–6	56:54 – Or. Rubio

6 min
Penalties
2 min
27
Shots
43

13 January 2017; 13:00	Serbia	7–4 (3–0, 1–2, 3–2)	Mexico	Pista de Hielo Lobete, Logroño; Attendance: 38

Game reference

Referee:
(Latvia) Andreis Kudrjasovs
Linesmen:
(Spain) Sergio Biec
(Denmark) Kenneth Nielsen

Lestarić (Đumić) – 02:43	1–0
Lestaric (Đumić, Podunavac) (PP) – 05:47	2–0
Đumić (Nikolić, Lestaric) (PP) – 07:05	3–0
	3–1	21:01 – Perez (Najera, Cruz) (PP)
Vukićević (Đumić) – 21:22	4–1
	4–2	35:23 – Bermejo (Benabib, Colon) (SH)
	4–3	45:22 – Pierce (Bermejo, Cruz) (PP)
	4–4	53:50 – Pierce (Bermejo, Najera) (PP)
Nikolić (Lestaric, Vukićević) (PP2) – 57:08	5–4
V. Dragović (Janković, Živić) (PP) – 57:31	6–4
Spanjević (Filipović, Grković) – 58:02	7–4

12 min
Penalties
22 min
35
Shots
29

13 January 2017; 16:30	Belgium	5–1 (2–0, 2–1, 1–0)	Australia	Pista de Hielo Lobete, Logroño; Attendance: 115

Game reference

Bruce Hallewaert
Seppe Stroobants
Goalies
Alex Tetreault

Op de Beeck (Laan, Janssen) – 17:11	1–0
Versin (Tambeur, Klijsen) – 18:41	2–0
Kila (De Croock) – 26:12	3–0
	3–1	27:35 – Marino (Henning)
De Croock (Delmarche, Kila) – 30:14	4–1
Laan (Delmarche, Huyghe) – 47:16	5–1

4 min
Penalties
18 min
42
Shots
12

13 January 2017; 20:00	South Korea	5–3 (1–1, 1–0, 3–2)	Spain	Pista de Hielo Lobete, Logroño; Attendance: 1,100

Game reference

Shim Hyounseop
Goalies
Lucas Serna

	0–1	15:57 – Granell (Arraras, Garcia)
Lee H. (Lee Je., Shin) – 18:15	1–1
Lee K. (Kim B.) – 38:58	2–1
Lee H. (Lee Je., Eom) – 53:57	3–1
	3–2	57:44 – Granell (Or. Rubio, Garcia) (PP2, EA)
Kim B. (Ahm) (SH) – 57:51	4–2
	4–3	58:06 – Monge (Garcia, Burgos) (PP)
Lee Je. (Nam) (ENG) – 59:51	5–3

10 min
Penalties
4 min
42
Shots
43

=== Statistics ===
==== Top 10 scorers ====
Pos	Player	Country	GP	G	A	Pts	+/-	PIM
1	Oriol Rubio	Spain	5	5	6	11	+3	4
2	Mirko Đjumić	Serbia	5	3	8	11	+12	6
3	Bruno Baldris	Spain	5	1	10	11	+5	2
4	Ignacio Granell	Spain	5	6	4	10	+3	0
5	Alejandro Burgos	Spain	5	4	6	10	+6	6
6	Luka Vukićević	Serbia	5	6	3	9	+8	6
7	Lazar Lestarić	Serbia	5	4	5	9	+7	0
8	Arunas Bermejo	Mexico	5	2	7	9	–6	14
9	Alfonso Garcia	Spain	5	1	7	8	+7	0
9	Nam Heedoo	South Korea	5	1	7	8	+10	0

==== Goaltending leaders ====
(minimum 40% team's total ice time)

Pos	Player	Country	MINS	GA	Sv%	GAA	SO
1	Shim Hyounseop	South Korea	215:35	6	93.68	1.67	0
2	Jug Mitić	Serbia	303:24	12	92.73	2.37	1
3	Lucas Serna	Spain	299:04	11	91.20	2.21	1
4	Alex Tetreault	Australia	266:33	28	87.93	6.30	0
5	Seppe Stroobants	Belgium	149:16	9	87.84	3.62	0

=== Awards ===
==== Best Players Selected by the Directorate ====
- Goaltender: (Serbia) Jug Mitić
- Defenceman: (Spain) Bruno Baldris
- Forward: (Spain) Oriol Rubio
