= Serbia men's national junior ice hockey team =

Serbia
- Association: Serbian Ice Hockey Association
- General manager: (Serbia) Djordje Ljoljić
- Head coach: (Serbia) Dan Kesa
- Assistants: (Serbia) Nemanja Janković
- Captain: Dimitrije Filipovic
- Most points: Aleksa Lukovic (24)
- IIHF code: SRB

First international
- Lithuania 8 – 1 Serbia (Elektrėnai, Lithuania; 10 December 2006)

Biggest win
- Serbia 16 – 0 Bulgaria (Belgrade, Serbia; 16 January 2008); Serbia 17 – 1 Bulgaria (Mexico City, Mexico; 10 January 2010)

Biggest defeat
- Japan 11 – 1 Serbia (Miercurea Ciuc, Romania; 18 December 2008)

IIHF World U20 Championship
- Appearances: 19 (first in 2007)
- Best result: 28th (2020)

International record (W–L–T)
- 51–45–0

The Serbia men's national under-20 ice hockey team is the national under-20 ice hockey team in Serbia. The team represents Serbia at the International Ice Hockey Federation's World Junior Hockey Championship Division II Group B.

== International competitions ==
- 1995–2006 – as Serbia and Montenegro
- 2007 – 33rd overall (6th in Division II, Group B)
- 2008 – 36th overall (2nd in Division III)
- 2009 – 32nd overall (5th in Division II, Group A)
- 2010 – 33rd overall (6th in Division II, Group B)
- 2011 – 36th overall (2nd in Division III)
- 2012 – 31st overall (3rd in Division IIB)
- 2013 – 31st overall (3rd in Division IIB)
- 2014 – 31st overall (3rd in Division IIB)
- 2015 – 33rd overall (5th in Division IIB)
- 2016 – 31st overall (3rd in Division IIB)
- 2017 – 31st overall (3rd in Division IIB)
- 2018 – 30th overall (2nd in Division IIB)
- 2019 – 29th overall (1st in Division IIB)
- 2020 – 28th overall (6th in Division IIA)
- 2021 – Cancelled due to COVID-19 pandemic
- 2022 – 31st overall (3rd in Division IIB)
- 2023 – 31st overall (3rd in Division IIB)
- 2024 – 30th overall (2nd in Division IIB)
- 2025 – 31st overall (3rd in Division IIB)
- 2026 – 32nd overall (4th in Division IIB)
- 2027 – (Division IIB)
