= 2018 World Junior Ice Hockey Championships – Division II =

International ice hockey tournament

2018 IIHF U20 World Championship Division II

Tournament details
- Host countries: United Kingdom; Serbia
- Venue(s): 2 (in 2 host cities)
- Dates: 10–16 December 2017; 10–16 January 2018
- Teams: 12

The 2018 World Junior Ice Hockey Championship Division II consisted of two tiered groups of six teams each: the fourth-tier Division II A and the fifth-tier Division II B. For each tier's tournament, the first-placed team was promoted to a higher division, while the last-placed team was relegated to a lower division.

The tournaments were played in a round-robin tournament format, with two points allotted for a win, one additional point for a regulation win, and one point for an overtime or game winning shots loss.

To be eligible as a junior, a player couldn't be born earlier than 1998.

Division II A was held in Dumfries, United Kingdom, while Division II B was hosted in Belgrade, Serbia.

== Division II A ==
2018 IIHF U20 World Championship Division II A
Tournament details
- Host country: United Kingdom
- City: Dumfries
- Venue(s): 1 (in 1 host city)
- Dates: 10–16 December 2017
- Teams: 6

Tournament statistics
- Games played: 15
- Goals scored: 117 (7.8 per game)
- Attendance: 5,928 (395 per game)
- Scoring leader(s): (United Kingdom) Liam Kirk (14 points)

Official website
- www.iihf.com

The Division II A tournament was played in Dumfries, United Kingdom, from 10 to 16 December 2017.

As a result of the tournament, Japan was promoted to Division I B, and the Netherlands was relegated to Division II B.

=== Participating teams ===
Team	Qualification
Great Britain	hosts; placed 6th in Division I B last year and were relegated
Japan	placed 2nd in Division II A last year
Romania	placed 3rd in Division II A last year
Estonia	placed 4th in Division II A last year
Netherlands	placed 5th in Division II A last year
South Korea	placed 1st in Division II B last year and were promoted

=== Final standings ===
Pos	Team	Pld	W	OTW	OTL	L	GF	GA	GD	Pts	Promotion or relegation
1	Japan	5	4	1	0	0	23	7	+16	14	Promoted to the 2019 Division I B
2	South Korea	5	2	2	0	1	21	19	+2	10 (Note: South Korea defeated Great Britain 5–4)	
3	Great Britain (H)	5	3	0	1	1	23	15	+8	10	
4	Estonia	5	1	0	1	3	20	25	−5	4 (Note: Estonia defeated Romania 8–4)	
5	Romania	5	1	0	1	3	17	20	−3	4	
6	Netherlands	5	1	0	0	4	13	31	−18	3	Relegated to the 2019 Division II B

Source: IIHF
Rules for classification: 1) points; 2) head-to-head points; 3) head-to-head goal difference; 4) head-to-head number of goals scored; 5) result against closest best-ranked team outside tied teams; 6) result against second-best ranked team outside tied teams; 7) seeding before tournament.
(H) Host

=== Match results ===
All times are local (Greenwich Mean Time – UTC+0).

10 December 2017; 13:00	Japan	6–1 (3–1, 2–0, 1–0)	Netherlands	Dumfries Ice Bowl; Attendance: 167

Game reference

Ryota Koda
Goalies
Sander Kosters
Referee:
(Finland) Joonas Kova
Linesmen:
(United Kingdom) Andrew Dalton
(Denmark) Mads Mandrup

Kobori (Aoyama) (PP) – 06:03	1–0
Yoneyama (PP) – 06:47	2–0
Aoyama (Sakuma) (PP) – 12:25	3–0
	3–1	18:23 – J. van Soest
Kobayashi (Tokuda, Shinoda) – 33:51	4–1
Igari (Kaneko, Aiki) – 34:42	5–1
Kobayashi (Tokuda, Sawade) – 41:47	6–1

12 min
Penalties
12 min
51
Shots
8

10 December 2017; 16:30	South Korea	5–4 GWS (0–1, 2–0, 2–3) (OT: 0–0) (SO: 3–1)	Estonia	Dumfries Ice Bowl; Attendance: 236

Game reference

Kim Tae-kyung
Goalies
Oliver Soovik
Referee:
(Czech Republic) Adam Kika
Linesmen:
(Italy) Christian Cristeli
(United Kingdom) Ally Flockhart

	0–1	01:40 – Kuznetsov (Jürgens)
Lee Jo. (Lee T.) (PP) – 25:09	1–1
Lee T. (Lee Ju., Lee Jo.) – 35:00	2–1
	2–2	44:06 – Simonov (Linde)
Lee Jo. (Park M., Lee Ju.) – 55:15	3–2
Kim S. (Chung, Lee H.) – 57:06	4–2
	4–3	58:50 – Linde (Kuznetsov, Simonov) (PP, EA)
	4–4	59:14 – Kuznetsov (Linde, Nestertsuk) (PP, EA)

Park H.
Lee Ju.
Park M. (miss)
Lee Jo.
Shootout
Linde
(miss) Simonov
(miss) K. Jõgi
(miss) Nestertsuk
33 min
Penalties
12 min
33
Shots
37

10 December 2017; 20:00	Great Britain	3–2 (0–0, 1–1, 2–1)	Romania	Dumfries Ice Bowl; Attendance: 418

Game reference

Jordan Lawday
Goalies
Örs Adorjan
Referee:
(Slovenia) Miha Bajt
Linesmen:
(United States) Nicholas Briganti
(Russia) Nikita Vilyugin

Duggan (Shudra, Kirk) – 20:11	1–0
	1–1	38:27 – Sándor (Ferencz-Csibi)
	1–2	43:19 – Reszegh (Casaneanu, Ferencz-Csibi)
Garrigan (Howlett, Gulliver) – 43:35	2–2
Shudra (Kirk, Howlett) (PP) – 52:16	3–2

10 min
Penalties
8 min
38
Shots
32

11 December 2017; 13:00	Netherlands	4–5 (1–2, 3–2, 0–1)	South Korea	Dumfries Ice Bowl; Attendance: 427

Game reference

Jaimy Missler
Goalies
Chun Jong-hun
Referee:
(Lithuania) Andrej Simankov
Linesmen:
(Switzerland) Cedric Borga
(United Kingdom) Ally Flockhart

	0–1	00:58 – Lee Jo. (Park M., Lee Ju.)
	0–2	01:58 – Park K.
Sikma (Muller) (SH) – 14:43	1–2
J. van Soest (T. van Soest, De Bonth) – 22:44	2–2
	2–3	23:10 – Kim Jung. (Park H.)
	2–4	23:57 – Lee Ju. (Park M., Lee Jo.) (PP)
Pohlman (Sikma, Copier) (PP2) – 31:55	3–4
Muller (T. van Soest) (PP) – 32:35	4–4
	4–5	50:11 – Lee H. (Kim S.)

12 min
Penalties
18 min
33
Shots
29

11 December 2017; 16:30	Japan	3–2 OT (1–1, 1–1, 0–0) (OT: 1–0)	Romania	Dumfries Ice Bowl; Attendance: 253

Game reference

Eiki Sato
Goalies
Örs Adorjan
Referee:
(Czech Republic) Adam Kika
Linesmen:
(United Kingdom) Andrew Dalton
(Russia) Nikita Vilyugin

Sawade (Tokuda) – 08:55	1–0
	1–1	14:28 – Ferencz-Csibi (Rokaly)
Kobori (Miura) – 25:50	2–1
	2–2	26:04 – Reszegh (PS)
Kobayashi (Shimizu) – 61:37	3–2

12 min
Penalties
12 min
57
Shots
18

11 December 2017; 20:00	Great Britain	6–2 (0–1, 3–0, 3–1)	Estonia	Dumfries Ice Bowl; Attendance: 487

Game reference

Jordan Lawday
Goalies
Christopher-Kullervo Jõgi
Referee:
(Finland) Joonas Kova
Linesmen:
(United States) Nicholas Briganti
(Italy) Christian Cristeli

	0–1	09:12 – Slessarevski (Linde) (PP2)
Kirk (Shudra, Lawday) (PP) – 24:11	1–1
Knaggs (Kelsall, Kerr) (PP) – 26:33	2–1
Buesa (Gulliver, Garrigan) – 26:48	3–1
Duggan (Kerr, Kirk) – 44:00	4–1
Shudra (Duggan) (PP) – 45:18	5–1
Duggan (Shudra, Kirk) – 50:54	6–1
	6–2	52:41 – Jefremov (Slessarevski) (PP)

10 min
Penalties
14 min
39
Shots
27

13 December 2017; 13:00	Romania	4–8 (2–1, 0–4, 2–3)	Estonia	Dumfries Ice Bowl; Attendance: 547

Game reference

Örs Adorján
Magor Szopos
Goalies
Oliver Soovik
Referee:
(Lithuania) Andrej Simankov
Linesmen:
(United States) Nicholas Briganti
(United Kingdom) Andrew Dalton

Sándor (Ferencz-Csibi, Rokaly) (PP) – 02:26	1–0
	1–1	07:44 – Linde (Jürgens) (PP2)
Ferencz-Csibi (Vasile, Sándor) (SH) – 17:57	2–1
	2–2	23:44 – Simonov (Linde, Laosma)
	2–3	26:48 – Nestertsuk (Linde, Slessarevski) (PP)
	2–4	30:45 – Nestertsuk (K. Jõgi) (SH)
	2–5	37:30 – Kuznetsov (Romanov, Barantsukov)
	2–6	45:53 – Romanov (Saar, Puzakov)
	2–7	46:19 – Kuznetsov (Jürgens, Laosma)
Rokaly – 54:48	3–7
Rokaly (Sándor, Antal) (SH) – 56:41	4–7
	4–8	59:09 – Simonov (Nestertsuk, Linde)

24 min
Penalties
16 min
35
Shots
45

13 December 2017; 16:30	Japan	5–1 (2–1, 0–0, 3–0)	South Korea	Dumfries Ice Bowl; Attendance: 235

Game reference

Eiki Sato
Goalies
Kim Tae-kyung
Referee:
(Slovenia) Miha Bajt
Linesmen:
(United Kingdom) Ally Flockhart
(Denmark) Mads Mandrup

Tokuda (Sawade, Kobayashi) (PP) – 03:54	1–0
	1–1	11:01 – Lee Jo. (Lee S.)
Sawade (Kobayashi, Tokuda) (PP) – 16:20	2–1
Kon (Sawade, Kobayashi) (PP) – 48:15	3–1
Aiki (Igari, Kudo) – 49:06	4–1
Aoyama (Kon, Kobayashi) – 52:18	5–1

6 min
Penalties
20 min
48
Shots
14

13 December 2017; 20:00	Great Britain	8–1 (1–0, 1–1, 6–0)	Netherlands	Dumfries Ice Bowl; Attendance: 527

Game reference

Ethan James
Goalies
Sander Kosters
Referee:
(Czech Republic) Adam Kika
Linesmen:
(Switzerland) Cedric Borga
(Russia) Nikita Vilyugin

Kirk (Duggan) – 17:50	1–0
	1–1	21:51 – Muller (Uytrecht)
Stubley (Gulliver, Buesa) – 26:29	2–1
Gulliver (Kirk) – 43:10	3–1
Kirk (Duggan, Buesa) (PP) – 47:38	4–1
Buesa – 48:36	5–1
Gulliver (Buesa) – 51:45	6–1
Waller (Kirk, Stubley) – 55:43	7–1
Kirk (PP) – 59:57	8–1

12 min
Penalties
12 min
48
Shots
16

14 December 2017; 13:00	Estonia	1–4 (0–1, 1–2, 0–1)	Japan	Dumfries Ice Bowl; Attendance: 473

Game reference

Oliver Soovik
Goalies
Ryota Koda
Referee:
(Finland) Joonas Kova
Linesmen:
(Italy) Christian Cristeli
(United Kingdom) Andrew Dalton

	0–1	05:30 – Kobayashi (Kon, Tokuda) (PP)
Kuznetsov (Anufrijev, Aleksandrov) (PP) – 29:50	1–1
	1–2	31:46 – Aoyama (Miura, Shimizu) (PP)
	1–3	32:48 – Aoyama (Kobori)
	1–4	57:47 – Aiki (Sawade) (ENG)

16 min
Penalties
20 min
24
Shots
34

14 December 2017; 16:30	Netherlands	1–7 (0–1, 0–2, 1–4)	Romania	Dumfries Ice Bowl; Attendance: 196

Game reference

Jaimy Missler
Goalies
Örs Adorján
Referee:
(Slovenia) Miha Bajt
Linesmen:
(United Kingdom) Ally Flockhart
(Russia) Nikita Vilyugin

	0–1	03:45 – Rokaly (PP)
	0–2	20:19 – Sándor (Rokaly)
	0–3	27:00 – Rokaly (Ferencz-Csibi, Gajdo)
	0–4	46:38 – Reszegh (Rokaly, Antal) (PP2)
Smeets (Hessels) – 51:39	1–4
	1–5	52:21 – R. Márton (Timaru)
	1–6	56:37 – Reszegh (Haraga)
	1–7	57:23 – Rokaly (Reszegh, Sándor) (PP)

32 min
Penalties
12 min
16
Shots
49

14 December 2017; 20:00	South Korea	5–4 GWS (0–0, 3–3, 1–1) (OT: 0–0) (SO: 3–1)	Great Britain	Dumfries Ice Bowl; Attendance: 467

Game reference

Chun Jong-hun
Goalies
Jordan Lawday
Ethan James
Referee:
(Lithuania) Andrej Simankov
Linesmen:
(Switzerland) Cedric Borga
(Denmark) Mads Mandrup

Lee H. (Kim S.) – 21:45	1–0
	1–1	27:03 – Shudra (Howlett, Kelsall)
Park H. (Kim Jung.) – 27:50	2–1
	2–2	36:38 – Kirk (Duggan, Shudra)
Lee Ju. (PS) – 38:10	3–2
	3–3	38:40 – Duggan (PS)
Lee Ju. (Lee Jo.) – 51:26	4–3
	4–4	57:33 – Kirk (Buesa, Shudra) (PP)

Park H.
Lee Ju. (miss)
Park M. (miss)
Kim Jo.
Park K.
Shootout
Kirk
(miss) Duggan
(miss) Waller
(miss) Shudra
10 min
Penalties
6 min
31
Shots
42

16 December 2017; 13:00	Romania	2–5 (1–2, 0–1, 1–2)	South Korea	Dumfries Ice Bowl; Attendance: 327

Game reference

Örs Adorjan
Goalies
Kim Tae-kyung
Referee:
(Finland) Joonas Kova
Linesmen:
(Italy) Christian Cristeli
(Denmark) Mads Mandrup

	0–1	01:28 – Lee Jo. (Lee Ju., Park M.)
	0–2	07:32 – Park M. (Chae, Kim Jung.)
Sándor – 10:40	1–2
	1–3	25:46 – Lee Jo. (Park M., Lee Seok-jin)
	1–4	45:39 – Lee Ju. (Park M., Kang) (PP)
Reszegh (Sandor) – 58:44	2–4
	2–5	59:39 – Lee Ju. (Lee Jo., Park M.) (ENG)

4 min
Penalties
8 min
35
Shots
33

16 December 2017; 16:30	Estonia	5–6 (3–0, 1–4, 1–2)	Netherlands	Dumfries Ice Bowl; Attendance: 433

Game reference

Christopher-Kullervo Jõgi
Oliver Soovik
Goalies
Sander Dalton
Jaimy Missler
Referee:
(Czech Republic) Adam Kirk
Linesmen:
(Switzerland) Cedric Borga
(United Kingdom) Andrew Dalton

Koll (Barantsukov) – 04:29	1–0
Nevzorov (Jurgens) – 05:36	2–0
Aleksandrov (Koll, Anufrijev) (PP) – 16:43	3–0
	3–1	22:00 – J. van Soest (T. van Soest, De Bonth)
Nestertsuk (Slessarevski, Aleksandrov) – 29:39	4–1
	4–2	32:48 – J. van Soest (Sikma)
	4–3	33:55 – Coehorst (De Ruiter)
	4–4	38:40 – Muller
	4–5	47:47 – J. van Soest (T. van Soest) (PP)
	4–6	51:19 – Sars (J. van Soest)
Aleksandrov (Linde) – 57:36	5–6

18 min
Penalties
18 min
48
Shots
24

16 December 2017; 20:00	Great Britain	2–5 (0–2, 1–0, 1–3)	Japan	Dumfries Ice Bowl; Attendance: 735

Game reference

Jordan Lawday
Goalies
Eiki Sato
Referee:
(Slovenia) Miha Bajt
Linesmen:
(United States) Nicholas Briganti
(Russia) Nikita Vilyugin

	0–1	04:22 – Kume (Sakuma)
	0–2	08:49 – Miura (Tokoro, Kobori) (PP)
Kirk (Knaggs, Kelsall) (PP2) – 29:21	1–2
	1–3	42:33 – Aiki (Kon)
	1–4	51:09 – Miura (Shimizu, Tokoro) (PP)
Shudra (Kirk, Knaggs) (EA) – 55:37	2–4
	2–5	59:04 – Shinoda (Tokoro, Kobayashi (ENG)

26 min
Penalties
10 min
28
Shots
30

=== Statistics ===
==== Top 10 scorers ====
Pos	Player	Country	GP	G	A	Pts	+/–	PIM
1	Liam Kirk	Great Britain	5	7	7	14	+6	6
2	Lee Jong-min	South Korea	5	6	4	10	+6	4
2	Lee Ju-hyung	South Korea	5	6	4	10	+6	4
4	Tohi Kobayashi	Japan	5	4	6	10	+7	2
5	Szilárd Rokaly	Romania	5	5	4	9	+5	4
6	Samuel Duggan	Great Britain	5	4	5	9	+6	0
6	Zoltán Sándor	Romania	5	4	5	9	+3	4
6	Cole Shudra	Great Britain	5	4	5	9	+6	22
9	Andre Linde	Estonia	5	2	7	9	–1	2
10	Park Min-gyu	South Korea	5	1	7	8	+7	4

GP = Games played; G = Goals; A = Assists; Pts = Points; +/− = Plus–minus; PIM = Penalties In Minutes
Source: IIHF

==== Goaltending leaders ====
(minimum 40% team's total ice time)

Pos	Player	Country	TOI	GA	Sv%	GAA	SO
1	Ryota Koda	Japan	120:56	2	93.75	0.99	0
2	Eiki Sato	Japan	180:41	5	91.67	1.66	0
3	Kim Tae-kyung	South Korea	185:00	11	90.83	3.57	0
4	Örs Adorján	Romania	286:25	17	90.12	3.56	0
5	Jordan Lawday	Great Britain	207:57	10	89.90	2.89	0

TOI = Time on ice (minutes:seconds); GA = Goals against; GAA = Goals against average; Sv% = Save percentage; SO = Shutouts
Source: IIHF

=== Awards ===
==== Best Players Selected by the Directorate ====
- Goaltender: (South Korea) Kim Tae-kyung
- Defenceman: (Japan) Daiki Aoyama
- Forward: (United Kingdom) Liam Kirk

== Division II B ==
2018 IIHF U20 World Championship Division II B
Tournament details
- Host country: Serbia
- City: Belgrade
- Venue(s): 1 (in 1 host city)
- Dates: 10–16 January 2018
- Teams: 6

Tournament statistics
- Games played: 15
- Goals scored: 111 (7.4 per game)
- Attendance: 3,720 (248 per game)
- Scoring leader(s): (Serbia) Luka Vukičević (12 points)

Official website
- www.iihf.com

The Division II B tournament was played in Belgrade, Serbia, from 10 to 16 January 2018.

As a result of the tournament, Spain was promoted to Division II A, and Turkey was relegated to Division III.

=== Participating teams ===
Team	Qualification
Croatia	placed 6th in Division II A last year and were relegated
Spain	placed 2nd in Division II B last year
Serbia	hosts; placed 3rd in Division II B last year
Belgium	placed 4th in Division II B last year
Mexico	placed 5th in Division II B last year
Turkey	placed 1st in Division III last year and were promoted

=== Final standings ===
Pos	Team	Pld	W	OTW	OTL	L	GF	GA	GD	Pts	Promotion or relegation
1	Spain	5	4	1	0	0	26	8	+18	14	Promoted to the 2019 Division II A
2	Serbia (H)	5	4	0	1	0	22	12	+10	13	
3	Croatia	5	3	0	0	2	16	11	+5	9	
4	Belgium	5	1	0	0	4	22	28	−6	3 (Note: Belgium 3 Pts, +4 GD; Mexico 3 Pts, –1 GD; Turkey 3 Pts, –3 GD)	
5	Mexico	5	1	0	0	4	12	22	−10	3	
6	Turkey	5	1	0	0	4	13	30	−17	3	Relegated to the 2019 Division III

Source: IIHF
Rules for classification: 1) points; 2) head-to-head points; 3) head-to-head goal difference; 4) head-to-head number of goals scored; 5) result against closest best-ranked team outside tied teams; 6) result against second-best ranked team outside tied teams; 7) seeding before tournament.
(H) Host

=== Match results ===
All times are local (Central European Time – UTC+1).

10 January 2018; 13:00	Turkey	3–8 (1–2, 2–2, 0–4)	Belgium	Pionir Ice Hall, Belgrade; Attendance: 50

Game reference

Tolga Bozacı
Onurcan Kaya
Goalies
Anthony Gubbels
Referee:
(Netherlands) Ramon Sterkens
Linesmen:
(Serbia) David Perduv
(Netherlands) Nicholas Verbruggen

	0–1	02:34 – Claessens (Cuylaerts)
	0–2	08:28 – Dhondt (Cuylaerts, Tambeur)
Taygar (M. Turan, H. Seçer) – 10:59	1–2
	1–3	25:27 – Dhondt (Tambeur, Auger)
Bingöl (E. Seçer) – 26:42	2–3
K. Salt (Taygar, Kars) (SH) – 33:59	3–3
	3–4	37:27 – Coolen (Dhondt, Auger)
	3–5	50:05 – De Croock (Klijsen) (SH)
	3–6	52:52 – De Croock (Delmarche, Cuylaerts) (PP)
	3–7	55:07 – Ceuster (Coolen, Cuylaerts) (PP)
	3–8	57:58 – Dhondt (Wellens

12 min
Penalties
14 min
27
Shots
44

10 January 2018; 16:30	Spain	4–0 (1–0, 1–0, 2–0)	Mexico	Pionir Ice Hall, Belgrade; Attendance: 40

Game reference

Raul Barbo
Goalies
Gerado García del Valle
Referee:
(Poland) Michal Baca
Linesmen:
(Iceland) Oli Gunnarsson
(Romania) Flavius Crisan Hunor

Gil (Burgos) – 17:58	1–0
Cerda (Mendizabal, Arraras) (PP) – 24:32	2–0
Donath (Rubio, Baldris) (PP) – 46:17	3–0
O'Hare – 58:56	4–0

14 min
Penalties
16 min
54
Shots
9

10 January 2018; 20:00	Serbia	3–2 (1–1, 0–1, 2–0)	Croatia	Pionir Ice Hall, Belgrade; Attendance: 630

Game reference

Jug Mitić
Goalies
Vito Nikolić
Referee:
(Sweden) Paer Daniel Eriksson
Linesmen:
(Canada) Kelsey Mahoney
(Kazakhstan) Timur Morev

Subotić (Ćurčić) – 02:18	1–0
	1–1	17:31 – Kramarić (Fičur, Trstenjak) (PP)
	1–2	28:48 – Čanić (Trstenjak) (PP)
Ćurčić (Subotić) – 41:09	2–2
Vukičević (Đumić) – 48:12	3–2

18 min
Penalties
24 min
28
Shots
15

11 January 2018; 13:00	Mexico	4–6 (2–1, 0–2, 2–3)	Turkey	Pionir Ice Hall, Belgrade; Attendance: 40

Game reference

Gerardo García del Valle
Goalies
Onurcan Kaya
Referee:
(Poland) Michal Baca
Linesmen:
(Serbia) Tibor Fazekas
(Canada) Kelsey Mahoney

	0–1	08:44 – Anlar (Bakal, H. Seçer) (PP)
Nájera (Hagerman) – 10:33	1–1
Ariza (Najera, Gil) – 17:06	2–1
	2–2	26:16 – Kars (SH)
	2–3	37:57 – H. Seçer (Kars)
Cruz (Pérez) – 43:29	3–3
Ramos (Ortiz) – 47:15	4–3
	4–4	48:38 – Bakal
	4–5	52:09 – K. Salt (Taygar, Kahraman) (PP2)
	4–6	52:39 – Bakal (H. Salt, Kars) (PP)

16 min
Penalties
2 min
27
Shots
48

11 January 2018; 16:30	Croatia	4–2 (2–0, 0–1, 2–1)	Belgium	Pionir Ice Hall, Belgrade; Attendance: 30

Game reference

Vito Nikolić
Goalies
Anthony Gubbels
Referee:
(Sweden) Paer Daniel Eriksson
Linesmen:
(Romania) Flavius Crisan Hunor
(Kazakhstan) Timur Morev

Kramarić (Čanić, Paulovic) (PP) – 08:13	1–0
Crnec (Krikšić, Trstenjak) (PP) – 17:06	2–0
	2–1	34:53 – Coolen (Ceuster, Cuylaerts)
Paulovic (Čanić, Fičur) (PP) – 52:19	3–1
	3–2	53:10 – Daems (Klijsen, Coolen)
Paulovic – 56:20	4–2

10 min
Penalties
20 min
32
Shots
33

11 January 2018; 20:00	Spain	3–2 GWS (1–0, 0–0, 1–2) (OT: 0–0) (SO: 2–1)	Serbia	Pionir Ice Hall, Belgrade; Attendance: 720

Game reference

Raul Barbo
Goalies
Jug Mitić
Referee:
(Russia) Alexander Soin
Linesmen:
(Iceland) Oli Gunnarsson
(Netherlands) Nicholas Verbruggen

Sánchez (Cerda, A. Martin) (PP) – 19:01	1–0
	1–1	46:52 – Pejčić (Vukičević) (SH)
	1–2	51:20 – Vukičević (Grković, Subotić) (PP)
A. Garcia (Donath, Cerda) (PP) – 59:01	2–2

Cerda (miss)
Burgos (miss)
O'Hare
Baldris (miss)
Rubio (miss)
Cerda
Shootout
(miss) Grković
(miss) Đumić
(miss) Subotić
(miss) Kastel
Vojinovic
(miss) Đumić
37 min
Penalties
34 min
39
Shots
29

13 January 2018; 13:00	Croatia	5–2 (1–1, 2–1, 2–0)	Mexico	Pionir Ice Hall, Belgrade; Attendance: 20

Game reference

Leon Hergešić-Adamović
Goalies
Gerardo García del Valle
Referee:
(Russia) Alexander Soin
Linesmen:
(Serbia) Tibor Fazekas
(Kazakhstan) Timur Morev

Fičur – 00:34	1–0
	1–1	08:35 – Hagerman
Vuglač (Stančić) – 23:24	2–1
	2–2	30:01 – Linares (Ramos)
Krikšić (Fičur) (SH) – 32:02	3–2
Šutevski – 52:51	4–2
Fičur (Matić) (ENG) – 59:08	5–2

10 min
Penalties
8 min
41
Shots
23

13 January 2018; 16:30	Spain	7–2 (3–1, 2–0, 2–1)	Turkey	Pionir Ice Hall, Belgrade; Attendance: 30

Game reference

Raul Barbo
Goalies
Onurcan Kaya
Referee:
(Netherlands) Ramon Sterkens
Linesmen:
(Serbia) David Perduv
(Netherlands) Nicholas Verbruggen

Burgos (Mendizabal, Cerda) – 04:08	1–0
	1–1	12:31 – Kahraman (Bingöl)
O'Hare (Dorath, Baldris) – 12:48	2–1
A. Martin (Sarmiento, Martinez) – 18:27	3–1
Martinez (P. Garcia, Baldris) – 33:39	4–1
Rubio (O'Hare, Donath) – 38:43	5–1
	5–2	44:16 – Bakal (Kars, K. Salt) (PP2)
Donath (Rubio) – 52:56	6–2
Cerda (Burgos) (PP) – 58:15	7–2

14 min
Penalties
12 min
50
Shots
11

13 January 2018; 20:00	Serbia	7–5 (4–2, 2–0, 1–3)	Belgium	Pionir Ice Hall, Belgrade; Attendance: 720

Game reference

Jug Mitić
Goalies
Anthony Gubbels
Referee:
(Poland) Michal Baca
Linesmen:
(Iceland) Oli Gunnarsson
(Canada) Kelsey Mahoney

Ćurčić (Grković) – 02:16	1–0
Đumić (Vukičević, Španjević) – 02:39	2–0
	2–1	08:12 – Henin (Dhondt)
Kastel (PP) – 10:25	3–1
	3–2	11:54 – Auger (Henin) (PP)
Vojinovic (Dragović, Kastel) (PP) – 18:24	4–2
Đumić (Vukičević) – 24:12	5–2
Vukičević (Đumić) (SH) – 27:27	6–2
	6–3	42:08 Dhondt (Tambeur)
	6–4	47:30 – Swennen (Dhondt)
Vukičević (Đumić) (ENG) – 58:09	7–4
	7–5	58:19 – De Croock (Auger)

36 min
Penalties
47 min
29
Shots
34

15 January 2018; 13:00	Belgium	3–9 (1–1, 2–4, 0–4)	Spain	Pionir Ice Hall, Belgrade; Attendance: 40

Game reference

Anthony Gubbels
Goalies
Raul Barbo
Referee:
(Sweden) Paer Daniel Eriksson
Linesmen:
(Canada) Kelsey Mahoney
(Serbia) David Perduv

Coolen (De Ceuster) – 06:38	1–0
	1–1	19:31 – Rubio (Baldris, O'Hare) (PP)
Compere (Klijsen, Delmarche) (PP) – 24:29	2–1
	2–2	26:25 – Torres (Arraras, Sánchez)
Swennen (Dhondt, Tambeur) – 28:16	3–2
	3–3	36:54 – Cerda (Burgos) (PP)
	3–4	37:23 – Giménez (Arraras)
	3–5	38:06 – Torres (Cerda, Burgos) (PP)
	3–6	44:21 – Torres (Cerda) (PP)
	3–7	49:29 – Cerda (Mendizabal, Torres) (PP)
	3–8	52:38 – Donath
	3–9	59:17 – Arraras (SH2)

68 min
Penalties
10 min
14
Shots
36

15 January 2018; 16:30	Turkey	1–4 (1–0, 0–1, 0–3)	Croatia	Pionir Ice Hall, Belgrade; Attendance: 30

Game reference

Onurcan Kaya
Goalies
Vito Nikolić
Referee:
(Russia) Alexander Soin
Linesmen:
(Serbia) Tibor Fazekas
(Netherlands) Nicholas Verbruggen

Bakal (Kars, E. Seçer) – 18:01	1–0
	1–1	26:45 – Matić (Krikšić)
	1–2	42:38 – Trstenjak (SH)
	1–3	47:52 – Paulovic (PP)
	1–4	58:02 – Krikšić (Matić, Fičur)

10 min
Penalties
6 min
18
Shots
45

15 January 2018; 20:00	Mexico	1–3 (0–0, 1–2, 0–1)	Serbia	Pionir Ice Hall, Belgrade; Attendance: 740

Game reference

Santiago Gómez
Goalies
Jug Mitić
Referee:
(Netherlands) Ramon Sterkens
Linesmen:
(Romania) Flavius Crisan Hunor
(Kazakhstan) Timur Morev

	0–1	29:09 – Filipović (Đumić)
	0–2	36:41 – Vukičević (Subotić, Kastel) (PP)
Pérez (Cruz, Urbano) – 38:02	1–2
	1–3	54:55 – Grković (Subotić, Đumić) (PP)

14 min
Penalties
10 min
9
Shots
38

16 January 2018; 13:00	Croatia	1–3 (0–1, 1–0, 0–2)	Spain	Pionir Ice Hall, Belgrade; Attendance: 50

Game reference

Vito Nikolić
Goalies
Raul Barbo
Referee:
(Sweden) Paer Daniel Eriksson
Linesmen:
(Serbia) Tibor Fazekas
(Canada) Kelsey Mahoney

	0–1	08:21 – Arraras (Rubio, Baldris)
Fičur (Trstenjak, Čanić) – 29:56	1–1
	1–2	47:03 – Donath (PP)
	1–3	59:23 – Donath (A. Garcia) (ENG)

10 min
Penalties
22 min
18
Shots
36

16 January 2018; 16:30	Belgium	4–5 (3–3, 1–2, 0–0)	Mexico	Pionir Ice Hall, Belgrade; Attendance: 20

Game reference

Morgan Schaller
Anthony Gubbels
Goalies
Gerardo García del Valle
Referee:
(Netherlands) Ramon Sterkens
Linesmen:
(Kazakhstan) Timur Morev
(Serbia) David Perduv

De Ceuster (Coolen, Daems) – 08:15	1–0
Versin (De Croock) – 11:35	2–0
	2–1	12:51 – Pierce (Cruz, Pérez) (PP)
	2–2	15:42 – Pérez
Klijsen (De Croock, Versin) (PP) – 16:50	3–2
	3–3	18:34 – Ramos (Gil, Linares) (PP)
Versin (De Croock, Klijsen) – 20:37	4–3
	4–4	22:46 – Urbano (Pérez)
	4–5	32:14 – Pérez (Gil)

20 min
Penalties
10 min
33
Shots
25

16 January 2018; 20:00	Serbia	7–1 (1–1, 4–0, 2–0)	Turkey	Pionir Ice Hall, Belgrade; Attendance: 560

Game reference

Jug Mitić
Goalies
Onurcan Kaya
Referee:
(Poland) Michal Baca
Linesmen:
(Iceland) Oli Gunnarsson
(Netherlands) Nicholas Verbruggen

Vukičević (Đumić, Španjević) – 00:38	1–0
	1–1	19:26 – Kahraman (Bingöl)
Vukičević (Španjević, Đumić) – 24:11	2–1
Grković (Subotić, Kastel) – 24:54	3–1
Vukičević (M. Marković, Đumić) – 26:34	4–1
Đumić (Vukičević, Filipović) – 35:32	5–1
Janković (Kastel) (PP) – 46:55	6–1
Dragović (Zotović) – 58:14	7–1

24 min
Penalties
20 min
47
Shots
14

=== Statistics ===
==== Top 10 scorers ====
Pos	Player	Country	GP	G	A	Pts	+/-	PIM
1	Luka Vukićević	Serbia	5	8	4	12	+8	14
2	Mirko Đjumić	Serbia	5	3	8	11	+7	10
3	Joan Cerda	Spain	5	5	5	10	0	6
4	Dorian Donath	Spain	5	5	3	8	+6	6
5	Rino Dhondt	Belgium	5	4	4	8	+7	18
6	Oliver de Croock	Belgium	5	3	4	7	–3	4
6	Bruno Fičur	Croatia	5	3	4	7	0	2
8	Ben Coolen	Belgium	5	3	3	6	0	24
8	Jorge Pérez	Mexico	5	3	3	6	–3	8
10	Yusuf Kars	Turkey	5	1	5	6	–7	8
10	Srdjan Subotić	Serbia	5	1	5	6	+3	8

==== Goaltending leaders ====
(minimum 40% team's total ice time)

Pos	Player	Country	MINS	GA	Sv%	GAA	SO
1	Vito Nikolić	Croatia	239:20	8	92.98	2.01	0
2	Raul Barbo	Spain	305:00	8	90.12	1.57	1
3	Gerardo García del Valle	Mexico	238:30	18	89.71	4.53	0
4	Jug Mitić	Serbia	305:00	12	89.19	2.36	0
5	Onurcan Kaya	Turkey	260:47	26	85.87	5.98	0

=== Awards ===
==== Best Players Selected by the Directorate ====
- Goaltender: (Spain) Raul Barbo
- Defenceman: (Croatia) Luka Kramarić
- Forward: (Serbia) Luka Vukičević
