= Robert Arrak =

Estonian ice hockey player (born 1999)

- Born: 1 April 1999 (age 27) Tallinn, Estonia
- Height: 1.88 m (6 ft 2 in)
- Weight: 88 kg (194 lb; 13 st 12 lb)
- Position: Centre
- Shoots: Left
- PHL team Former teams: KH Toruń; Sport; Cracovia; JKH GKS Jastrzębie
- National team: Estonia
- Playing career: 2018–present

Robert Arrak (born 1 April 1999) is an Estonian professional ice hockey player who is a centre for KH Toruń of the Polska Hokej Liga (PHL). He previously played professionally in Finland with Sport of the Liiga.

Internationally, Arrak represents Estonia.

== Playing career ==
On 29 March 2018, Arrak signed a one-year contract, with an option of extension for another season, with Sport of the Liiga. He made his Liiga debut on 14 September 2018, in a 4–2 victory over Pelicans. He played four games for Sport before being loaned to Hermes of the second-tier Mestis in November 2018.

== International play ==
Arrak debuted internationally for the Estonia under-18 team at the 2014 World U18 Championships. He recorded three goals and one assist as the team won the Division II Group B tournament.

Arrak first played for the senior team at the 2018 Winter Olympics qualifying tournament.

== Career statistics ==
=== Regular season and playoffs ===
| | | | Regular season | | | | | Playoffs |
| Season | Team | League | GP | G | A | Pts | PIM | GP | G | A | Pts | PIM |
|---|---|---|---|---|---|---|---|---|---|---|---|---|
| 2015–16 | Blues | FIN U18 | 36 | 10 | 10 | 20 | 113 | 4 | 1 | 1 | 2 | 2 |
| 2015–16 | Blues | FIN U20 | 1 | 0 | 0 | 0 | 0 | — | — | — | — | — |
| 2015–16 | Estonia Jr. Team | EST | 2 | 3 | 1 | 4 | 0 | — | — | — | — | — |
| 2016–17 | Blues | FIN U20 | 17 | 3 | 8 | 11 | 6 | — | — | — | — | — |
| 2016–17 | Estonia Jr. Team | EST | 1 | 1 | 1 | 2 | 0 | — | — | — | — | — |
| 2016–17 | Cedar Rapids RoughRiders | USHL | 37 | 3 | 3 | 6 | 8 | — | — | — | — | — |
| 2017–18 | Jokerit | FIN U20 | 48 | 21 | 22 | 43 | 30 | — | — | — | — | — |
| 2017–18 | Kiekko-Vantaa | Mestis | 9 | 1 | 1 | 2 | 2 | 5 | 0 | 2 | 2 | 0 |
| 2018–19 | Sport | FIN U20 | 17 | 3 | 8 | 11 | 8 | 9 | 1 | 2 | 3 | 2 |
| 2018–19 | Sport | Liiga | 4 | 0 | 0 | 0 | 0 | — | — | — | — | — |
| 2018–19 | Hermes | Mestis | 6 | 0 | 0 | 0 | 2 | — | — | — | — | — |
| 2019–20 | Red Bull Hockey Juniors | AlpsHL | 43 | 21 | 22 | 43 | 8 | — | — | — | — | — |
| 2020–21 | Lukko | FIN U20 | 38 | 15 | 15 | 30 | 26 | 8 | 3 | 2 | 5 | 20 |
| 2021–22 | KH Toruń | POL | 37 | 20 | 12 | 32 | 8 | 7 | 4 | 2 | 6 | 4 |
| 2022–23 | Cracovia | POL | 33 | 9 | 7 | 16 | 12 | 4 | 0 | 0 | 0 | 0 |
| 2023–24 | JKH GKS Jastrzębie | POL | 40 | 7 | 5 | 12 | 12 | 13 | 1 | 3 | 4 | 2 |
| 2024–25 | KH Toruń | POL | 36 | 17 | 7 | 24 | 8 | 6 | 2 | 2 | 4 | 2 |
| 2025–26 | KH Toruń | POL | 37 | 15 | 21 | 36 | 4 | 5 | 1 | 0 | 1 | 0 |
| Liiga totals | | | 4 | 0 | 0 | 0 | 0 | — | — | — | — | — |

=== International ===
| Year | Team | Event | Result | GP | G | A | Pts | PIM |
|---|---|---|---|---|---|---|---|---|
| 2014 | Estonia | WJC18-D2 | 29th | 5 | 3 | 1 | 4 | 0 |
| 2015 | Estonia | WJC-D2 | 27th | 5 | 1 | 1 | 2 | 0 |
| 2016 | Estonia | WJC-D2 | 25th | 5 | 2 | 3 | 5 | 0 |
| 2016 | Estonia | OGQ | NQ | 3 | 6 | 0 | 6 | 0 |
| 2017 | Estonia | WJC-D2 | 26th | 3 | 2 | 3 | 5 | 0 |
| 2017 | Estonia | WC-D1 | 26th | 5 | 0 | 0 | 0 | 0 |
| 2018 | Estonia | WC-D1 | 25th | 5 | 1 | 1 | 2 | 0 |
| 2019 | Estonia | WC-D1 | 26th | 5 | 0 | 2 | 2 | 0 |
| 2020 | Estonia | OGQ | NQ | 3 | 0 | 0 | 0 | 0 |
| 2022 | Estonia | WC-D1 | 25th | 4 | 0 | 2 | 2 | 2 |
| 2023 | Estonia | WC-D1 | 26th | 5 | 0 | 0 | 0 | 2 |
| 2024 | Estonia | OGQ | NQ | 6 | 8 | 8 | 16 | 0 |
| 2024 | Estonia | WC-D1 | 25th | 5 | 0 | 0 | 0 | 0 |
| 2025 | Estonia | WC-D1 | 25th | 5 | 3 | 2 | 5 | 0 |
| 2026 | Estonia | WC-D1 | 23rd | 5 | 0 | 6 | 6 | 0 |
| Junior totals | | | | 18 | 8 | 8 | 16 | 0 |
| Senior totals | | | | 51 | 18 | 21 | 39 | 4 |
