= Csanád Erdély =

Hungarian ice hockey player (born 1996)

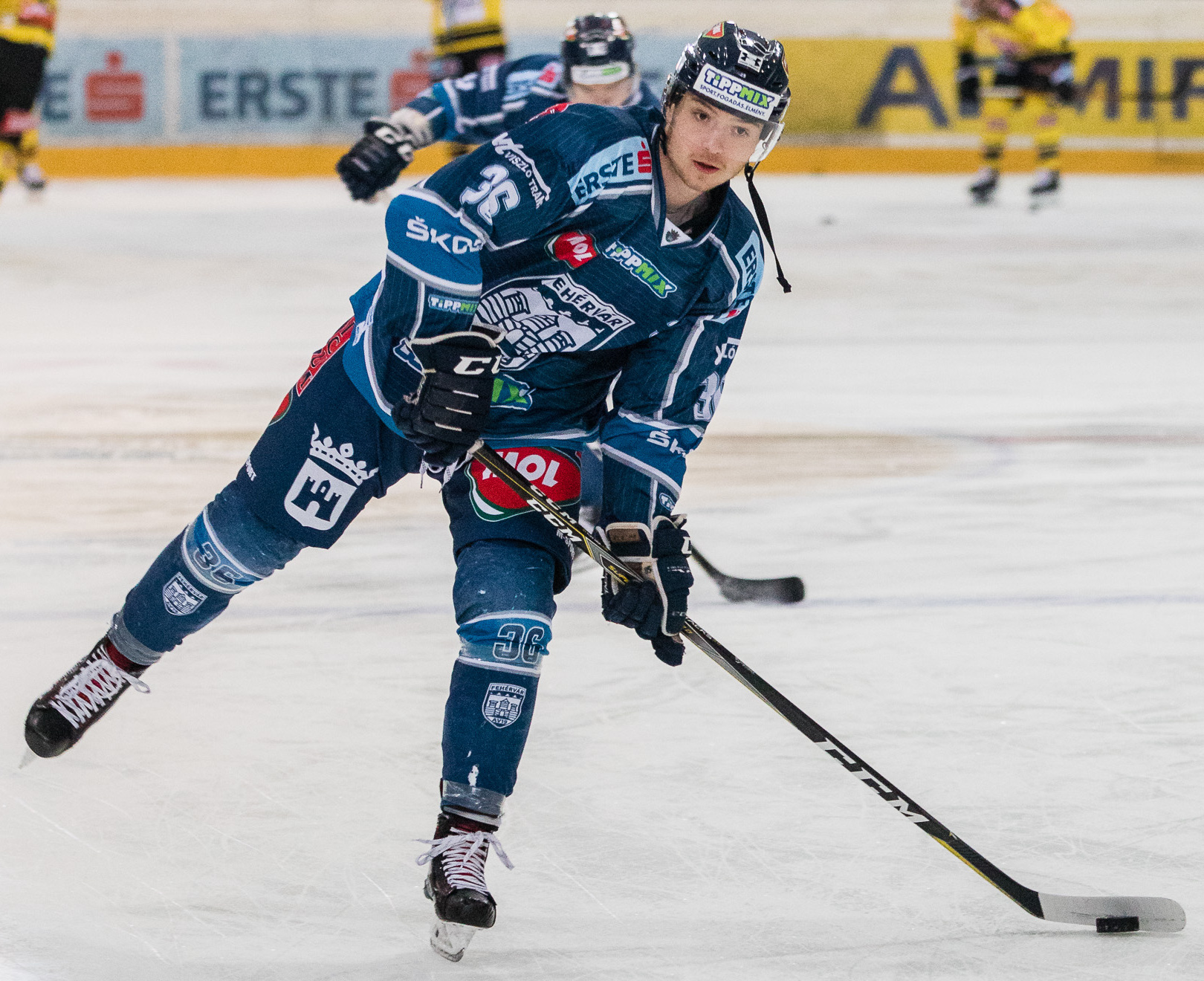
- Born: 5 April 1996 (age 30) Dunaújváros, Hungary
- Height: 6 ft 2 in (188 cm)
- Weight: 194 lb (88 kg; 13 st 12 lb)
- Position: Forward
- Shoots: Left
- ICEHL team: Fehérvár AV19
- National team: Hungary
- NHL draft: Undrafted
- Playing career: 2013–present

Csanád Erdély; (born 5 April 1996) is a Hungarian professional ice hockey player who is a forward for Fehérvár AV19 of the ICE Hockey League (ICEHL).

Erdély opted to play the 2015–16 season, in North America with the Sioux Falls Stampede of the United States Hockey League (USHL). After contributing 14 points in 55 games, he returned to his native Hungary for a second stint with Alba Volán Székesfehérvár on 21 June 2016.
