= Croatia men's national junior ice hockey team =

Men's national junior ice hockey team representing Croatia

Croatia
- The Coat of arms of Croatia is the badge used on the players jerseys.
- Association: Croatian Ice Hockey Federation
- Head coach: (Croatia) Danijel Kolombo
- Assistants: (Croatia) Blagus Mislav
- Captain: Borna Silovic
- Most points: Hrvoje Bozic (25)
- IIHF code: CRO

First international
- Latvia 10 – 0 Croatia (Riga, Latvia; 11 November 1992)

Biggest win
- Croatia 21 – 0 Greece (Riga, Latvia; 13 November 1992); Croatia 22 – 1 Bulgaria (Mexico City, Mexico; 16 January 2000)

Biggest defeat
- Norway 18 – 2 Croatia (Gdańsk, Poland; 15 December 2009)

IIHF World U20 Championship
- Appearances: 33 (first in 1993)
- Best result: 19th (2011)

International record (W–L–T)
- 36–45–7

The Croatian men's national under 20 ice hockey team is the national under-20 ice hockey team in Croatia. The team represents Croatia at the International Ice Hockey Federation's World Junior Hockey Championship Division I.

== International competitions ==
- 1993 – 30th overall (6th in Pool C Qualification)
- 1994 – 29th overall (11th in Pool C Qualification)
- 1995 – 29th overall (5th in Pool C2)
- 1996 – 27th overall (1st in Pool D)
- 1997 – 25th overall (7th in Pool C)
- 1998 – 23rd overall (5th in Pool C)
- 1999 – 26th overall (8th in Pool C)
- 2000 – 27th overall (1st in Pool D)
- 2001 – 24th overall (6th in Division II)
- 2002 – 22nd overall (4th in Division II)
- 2003 – 22nd overall (6th in Division I, Group A)
- 2004 – 29th overall (3rd in Division II, Group B)
- 2005 – 28th overall (3rd in Division II, Group B)
- 2006 – 27th overall (2nd in Division II, Group B)
- 2007 – 28th overall (3rd in Division II, Group A)
- 2008 – 28th overall (3rd in Division II, Group B)
- 2009 – 23rd overall (1st in Division II, Group A)
- 2010 – 20th overall (5th in Division I, Group B)
- 2011 – 19th overall (5th in Division I, Group B)
- 2012 – 21st overall (5th in Division IB)
- 2013 – 22nd overall (6th in Division IB)
- 2014 – 28th overall (6th in Division IIA)
- 2015 – 29th overall (1st in Division IIB)
- 2016 – 26th overall (4th in Division IIA)
- 2017 – 28th overall (6th in Division IIA)
- 2018 – 31st overall (3rd in Division IIB)
- 2019 – 30th overall (2nd in Division IIB)
- 2020 – 32nd overall (4th in Division IIB)
- 2021 – Cancelled due to the COVID-19 pandemic
- 2022 – 29th overall (1st in Division IIB)
- 2023 – 23rd overall (1st in Division IIA)
- 2024 – 22nd overall (6th in Division IB)
- 2025 – 25th overall (3rd in Division IIA)
- 2026 – 25th overall (3rd in Division IIA)
