= 2022 World Junior Ice Hockey Championships – Division II =

International ice hockey tournament

2022 IIHF U20 World Championship Division II
Tournament details
- Host countries: Romania; Serbia
- Venues: 2 (in 2 host cities)
- Dates: 13–19 December 2021; 12–17 September 2022
- Teams: 11

The 2022 World Junior Ice Hockey Championship Division II consisted of two tiered groups of six teams each: the fourth-tier Division II A and the fifth-tier Division II B. Due to the exclusion of Russia and Belarus, the following changes in promotions and relegations were made: The top two teams were promoted to a higher division and no team was relegated to a lower division.

To be eligible as a junior player in these tournaments, a player cannot be born earlier than 2002.

== Division II A ==
2022 IIHF U20 World Championship Division II A

Tournament details
- Host country: Romania
- City: Brașov
- Venue: 1 (in 1 host city)
- Dates: 13–19 December 2021
- Teams: 6

Tournament statistics
- Games played: 15
- Goals scored: 87 (5.8 per game)
- Attendance: 2,740 (183 per game)
- Scoring leader: (United Kingdom) Logan Neilson (8 points)

Official website
- www.iihf.com

The Division II A tournament was played in Brașov, Romania, from 13 to 19 December 2021.

=== Participating teams ===
Team	Qualification
Italy	placed 6th in 2020 Division I B and were relegated
Great Britain	placed 2nd in 2020 Division II A
Lithuania	placed 3rd in 2020 Division II A
Romania	hosts; placed 4th in 2020 Division II A
Spain	placed 5th in 2020 Division II A
South Korea	placed 1st in 2020 Division II B and were promoted

=== Final standings ===
Pos	Team	Pld	W	OTW	OTL	L	GF	GA	GD	Pts	Promotion
1	Italy	5	5	0	0	0	22	4	+18	15	Promoted to the 2023 Division I B
2	South Korea	5	2	2	0	1	17	13	+4	10	Promoted to the 2023 Division I B
3	Great Britain	5	2	0	1	2	21	17	+4	7 (Note: Great Britain 7–2 Spain)	
4	Spain	5	2	0	1	2	7	12	−5	7	
5	Lithuania	5	1	0	0	4	12	22	−10	3 (Note: Lithuania 6–3 Romania)	
6	Romania (H)	5	1	0	0	4	8	19	−11	3	

Source: IIHF
Rules for classification: 1) points; 2) head-to-head points; 3) head-to-head goal difference; 4) head-to-head number of goals scored; 5) result against closest best-ranked team outside tied teams; 6) result against second-best ranked team outside tied teams; 7) seeding before tournament.
(H) Host

=== Match results ===
All times are local (Eastern European Time – UTC+2).

13 December 2021; 13:00	Great Britain	7–2 (1–1, 3–1, 3–0)	Spain	Brașov Olympic Ice Rink, Brașov; Attendance: 35

Game reference
8 min	Penalties	14 min
36	Shots	23

13 December 2021; 16:30	Lithuania	0–7 (0–0, 0–4, 0–3)	Italy	Brașov Olympic Ice Rink, Brașov; Attendance: 25

Game reference
20 min	Penalties	12 min
20	Shots	60

13 December 2021; 20:00	South Korea	4–1 (0–0, 2–0, 2–1)	Romania	Brașov Olympic Ice Rink, Brașov; Attendance: 350

Game reference
6 min	Penalties	12 min
57	Shots	16

14 December 2021; 13:00	Great Britain	5–3 (1–1, 0–1, 4–1)	Lithuania	Brașov Olympic Ice Rink, Brașov; Attendance: 60

Game reference
14 min	Penalties	16 min
46	Shots	32

14 December 2021; 16:30	Spain	1–2 OT (0–0, 0–0, 1–1) (OT: 0–1)	South Korea	Brașov Olympic Ice Rink, Brașov; Attendance: 30

Game reference
18 min	Penalties	16 min
26	Shots	37

14 December 2021; 20:00	Italy	5–0 (4–0, 1–0, 0–0)	Romania	Brașov Olympic Ice Rink, Brașov; Attendance: 400

Game reference
10 min	Penalties	8 min
49	Shots	18

16 December 2021; 13:00	Italy	2–1 (1–1, 1–0, 0–0)	Spain	Brașov Olympic Ice Rink, Brașov; Attendance: 35

Game reference
16 min	Penalties	12 min
30	Shots	27

16 December 2021; 16:30	Great Britain	4–5 GWS (3–1, 1–1, 0–2) (OT: 0–0) (SO: 0–1)	South Korea	Brașov Olympic Ice Rink, Brașov; Attendance: 25

Game reference
14 min	Penalties	35 min
28	Shots	42

16 December 2021; 20:00	Lithuania	6–3 (2–1, 1–1, 3–1)	Romania	Brașov Olympic Ice Rink, Brașov; Attendance: 400

Game reference
14 min	Penalties	34 min
43	Shots	27

17 December 2021; 13:00	South Korea	1–5 (1–1, 0–2, 0–2)	Italy	Brașov Olympic Ice Rink, Brașov; Attendance: 30

Game reference
8 min	Penalties	12 min
20	Shots	28

17 December 2021; 16:30	Spain	2–1 (0–0, 1–1, 1–0)	Lithuania	Brașov Olympic Ice Rink, Brașov; Attendance: 50

Game reference
6 min	Penalties	8 min
34	Shots	24

17 December 2021; 20:00	Romania	4–3 (0–1, 4–1, 0–1)	Great Britain	Brașov Olympic Ice Rink, Brașov; Attendance: 600

Game reference
14 min	Penalties	12 min
32	Shots	47

19 December 2021; 13:00	Lithuania	2–5 (0–2, 2–1, 0–2)	South Korea	Brașov Olympic Ice Rink, Brașov; Attendance: 50

Game reference
35 min	Penalties	14 min
23	Shots	38

19 December 2021; 16:30	Italy	3–2 (1–1, 2–1, 0–0)	Great Britain	Brașov Olympic Ice Rink, Brașov; Attendance: 50

Game reference
16 min	Penalties	10 min
38	Shots	22

19 December 2021; 20:00	Romania	0–1 (0–0, 0–1, 0–0)	Spain	Brașov Olympic Ice Rink, Brașov; Attendance: 600

Game reference
6 min	Penalties	6 min
24	Shots	27

=== Statistics ===
==== Top 10 scorers ====
Pos	Player	Country	GP	G	A	Pts	+/–	PIM
1	Logan Neilson	Great Britain	5	6	2	8	+3	2
2	Finley Howells	Great Britain	5	3	5	8	0	4
3	Jack Hopkins	Great Britain	5	2	5	7	+4	6
4	Thomas Galimberti	Italy	5	4	2	6	+3	2
5	Alex Graham	Great Britain	5	3	3	6	–1	4
6	Jang Hee-gon	South Korea	5	3	2	5	+2	4
6	Eimantas Noreika	Lithuania	5	3	2	5	–7	31
8	Tommy Purdeller	Italy	5	2	3	5	+3	10
9	Enrico Larcher	Italy	5	1	4	5	+7	2
9	Lee Yun-suk	South Korea	5	1	4	5	+3	0

GP = Games played; G = Goals; A = Assists; Pts = Points; +/− = Plus–minus; PIM = Penalties In Minutes
Source: IIHF

==== Goaltending leaders ====
(minimum 40% team's total ice time)

Pos	Player	Country	TOI	GA	Sv%	GAA	SO
1	Carlo Muraro	Italy	150:35	1	98.18	0.40	1
2	Sergi Reina	Spain	182:04	3	96.47	0.99	1
3	Damian Clara	Italy	149:25	3	94.23	1.20	1
4	Lucas Brine	Great Britain	281:05	13	91.50	2.77	0
5	David Ors Mag	Romania	297:50	19	91.48	3.83	0

TOI = Time on ice (minutes:seconds); GA = Goals against; GAA = Goals against average; Sv% = Save percentage; SO = Shutouts
Source: IIHF

==== Best Players Selected by the Directorate ====
- Goaltender: (Italy) Carlo Muraro
- Defenceman: (South Korea) Park Jun-seo
- Forward: (United Kingdom) Finley Howells

Source: IIHF

== Division II B ==
2022 IIHF U20 World Championship Division IIB

Tournament details
- Host country: Serbia
- City: Belgrade
- Venue: 1 (in 1 host city)
- Dates: 12–17 September 2022
- Teams: 5

Tournament statistics
- Games played: 10
- Goals scored: 67 (6.7 per game)
- Attendance: 3,576 (358 per game)
- Scoring leader: (Croatia) Vito Idžan (9 points)

Official website
- www.iihf.com

The Division II B tournament was originally supposed to be played in Belgrade, Serbia, from 10 to 15 January 2022. On 24 December 2021, it was cancelled due to the COVID-19 pandemic and the rapid spread of the Omicron variant. The tournament was rescheduled and was played from 12 to 17 September 2022.

=== Participating teams ===
Team	Qualification
Serbia	hosts; placed 6th in 2020 Division II A and were relegated
Netherlands	placed 2nd in 2020 Division II B
~~China~~	placed 3rd in 2020 Division II B
Croatia	placed 4th in 2020 Division II B
Belgium	placed 5th in 2020 Division II B
Iceland	placed 1st in 2020 Division III and were promoted

=== Final standings ===
Pos	Team	Pld	W	OTW	OTL	L	GF	GA	GD	Pts	Promotion
1	Croatia	4	4	0	0	0	18	8	+10	12	Promoted to the 2023 Division II A
2	Netherlands	4	3	0	0	1	16	10	+6	9	Promoted to the 2023 Division II A
3	Serbia (H)	4	1	0	1	2	12	12	0	4	
4	Belgium	4	1	0	0	3	11	21	−10	3	
5	Iceland	4	0	1	0	3	10	16	−6	2	
6	~~China~~	0	0	0	0	0	0	0	0	0	Withdrew

Source: IIHF
Rules for classification: 1) points; 2) head-to-head points; 3) head-to-head goal difference; 4) head-to-head number of goals scored; 5) result against closest best-ranked team outside tied teams; 6) result against second-best ranked team outside tied teams; 7) seeding before tournament.
(H) Host

=== Match results ===
All times are local (Central European Time – UTC+1).

12 September 2022; 16:30	Iceland	3–5 (3–1, 0–1, 0–3)	Netherlands	Pionir Ice Hall, Belgrade; Attendance: 42

Game reference
12 min	Penalties	10 min
27	Shots	43

12 September 2022; 20:00	Serbia	1–3 (1–2, 0–0, 0–1)	Croatia	Pionir Ice Hall, Belgrade; Attendance: 967

Game reference
12 min	Penalties	14 min
23	Shots	28

13 September 2022; 20:00	Belgium	3–2 (2–0, 0–1, 1–1)	Iceland	Pionir Ice Hall, Belgrade; Attendance: 63

Game reference
4 min	Penalties	4 min
18	Shots	51

14 September 2022; 16:30	Netherlands	2–4 (0–2, 1–1, 1–1)	Croatia	Pionir Ice Hall, Belgrade; Attendance: 39

Game reference
6 min	Penalties	10 min
27	Shots	28

14 September 2022; 20:00	Belgium	3–10 (1–3, 0–3, 2–4)	Serbia	Pionir Ice Hall, Belgrade; Attendance: 824

Game reference
22 min	Penalties	6 min
22	Shots	56

15 September 2022; 20:00	Iceland	2–1 GWS (0–0, 1–1, 0–0) (OT: 0–0) (SO: 2–1)	Serbia	Pionir Ice Hall, Belgrade; Attendance: 623

Game reference
8 min	Penalties	6 min
32	Shots	33

16 September 2022; 16:30	Croatia	7–3 (2–0, 1–2, 4–1)	Iceland	Pionir Ice Hall, Belgrade; Attendance: 41

Game reference
31 min	Penalties	8 min
32	Shots	17

16 September 2022; 20:00	Netherlands	5–3 (1–1, 1–1, 3–1)	Belgium	Pionir Ice Hall, Belgrade; Attendance: 69

Game reference
12 min	Penalties	10 min
34	Shots	20

17 September 2022; 16:30	Croatia	4–2 (3–1, 1–1, 0–0)	Belgium	Pionir Ice Hall, Belgrade

Game reference
6 min	Penalties	10 min
36	Shots	26

17 September 2022; 20:00	Serbia	0–4 (0–0, 0–2, 0–2)	Netherlands	Pionir Ice Hall, Belgrade

Game reference
2 min	Penalties	10 min
28	Shots	20

=== Statistics ===
==== Top 10 Scorers ====
Pos	Player	Country	GP	G	A	Pts	+/–	PIM
1	Vito Idžan	Croatia	4	4	5	9	+6	4
2	Jay Huisman	Netherlands	4	5	3	8	+6	4
3	Lowie Vreys	Belgium	4	5	1	6	+1	0
4	Marvin Timmer	Netherlands	4	2	4	6	+6	2
4	Tijs Vreys	Belgium	4	2	4	6	0	12
6	Ante Bebek	Croatia	4	3	2	5	+7	2
6	Bruno Idžan	Croatia	4	3	2	5	+6	4
8	Mike Collard	Netherlands	4	2	3	5	+4	6
8	Matija Dinić	Serbia	4	2	3	5	+1	2
8	Viggó Hlynsson	Iceland	4	2	3	5	−3	2

GP = Games played; G = Goals; A = Assists; Pts = Points; +/− = Plus–minus; PIM = Penalties In Minutes
Source: IIHF

==== Goaltending leaders ====
(minimum 40% team's total ice time)

Pos	Player	Country	TOI	GA	Sv%	GAA	SO
1	Almer de Boer	Netherlands	120:00	3	93.75	1.50	1
2	Ivan Mikulić	Croatia	180:00	6	91.04	2.00	0
3	Akim Padalica	Serbia	244:07	10	90.00	2.46	0
4	Johann Ragnarsson	Iceland	182:25	12	88.79	3.95	0
5	Jelle Lievens	Belgium	240:00	21	88.14	5.25	0

TOI = Time on ice (minutes:seconds); GA = Goals against; GAA = Goals against average; Sv% = Save percentage; SO = Shutouts
Source: IIHF

==== Best Players Selected by the Directorate ====
- Goaltender: (Serbia) Akim Padalica
- Defenceman: (Netherlands) Wesley de Bruijn
- Forward: (Croatia) Vito Idžan
