= Belgium men's national junior ice hockey team =

Belgium
- Association: Royal Belgian Ice Hockey Federation
- Head coach: (Belgium) Domin van der Locht
- Assistants: (Belgium) Peter van Eemeren
- Captain: Sebastien Bollue
- Most points: Bryan Kolodziejczyk (21)
- IIHF code: BEL

First international
- Poland 23 – 2 Belgium (Caen, France; March 5, 1979)

Biggest win
- Belgium 14 – 0 Luxembourg (İzmit, Turkey; January 24, 2003)

Biggest defeat
- Estonia 25 – 2 Belgium (Novi Sad, Serbia; January 17, 2013)

IIHF World Junior Championship
- Appearances: 27 (first in 1979)
- Best result: 16th (1979)

International record (W–L–T)
- 22–44–1

The Belgian men's national under 20 ice hockey team is the national under-20 ice hockey team in Belgium. The team represents Belgium at the International Ice Hockey Federation's World Junior Hockey Championship Division II.

== International competitions ==
- 1979 – 16th overall (8th in Pool B)
- 1980–1983 – Did not participate
- 1984 – 21st overall (5th in Pool C)
- 1985 – 19th overall (3rd in Pool C)
- 1986 – 22nd overall (6th in Pool C)
- 1987 – Did not participate
- 1988 – 24th overall (8th in Pool C)
- 1989–2002 – Did not participate
- 2003 – 36th overall (2nd in Division III)
- 2004 – 32nd overall (5th in Division II, Group A)
- 2005 – 33rd overall (6th in Division II, Group B)
- 2006 – Did not participate
- 2007 – 36th overall (2nd in Division III)
- 2008 – 30th overall (4th in Division II, Group A)
- 2009 – 29th overall (4th in Division II, Group A)
- 2010 – 30th overall (4th in Division II, Group B)
- 2011 – 30th overall (4th in Division II, Group A)
- 2012 – 32nd overall (4th in Division IIB)
- 2013 – 34th overall (6th in Division IIB)
- 2014 – 35th overall (1st in Division III)
- 2015 – 32nd overall (4th in Division IIB)
- 2016 – 32nd overall (4th in Division IIB)
- 2017 – 32nd overall (4th in Division IIB)
- 2018 – 32nd overall (4th in Division IIB)
- 2019 – 32nd overall (4th in Division IIB)
- 2020 – 33rd overall (5th in Division IIB)
- 2021 – Cancelled
- 2022 – 32nd overall (4th in Division IIB)
- 2023 – 30th overall (2nd in Division IIB)
- 2024 – 33rd overall (5th in Division IIB)
- 2025 – 34th overall (6th in Division IIB)
- 2026 – 37th overall (3rd in Division IIIA)
