= Dušan Janković =

Serbian artist

Dušan Janković (1894-1950) was a Serbian avant-garde artist.

Dušan Janković was born in Niš in 1894. After joining the Serbian army in late 1914, he participated in the Great Retreat during the winter of 1915 across the Albanian mountains to the port of Skadar, where an awaiting Italian passenger ship evacuated him with the rest of the military personnel to Bari, Italy, and eventually to Rouen in France, where he would spend a significant part of his early youth. From 1916 he lived in Paris, where he studied at the École nationale supérieure des arts décoratifs from 1918 to 1921. The greatest number of his drawings, graphics and paintings was developed in Paris and in 1923 in Belgrade, he continued to devote himself to applied graphics and prints. Later, he returned to France where he continued painting. Upon his return to Belgrade in 1935, he again devoted himself to applied graphics and ceramics and porcelain which was the vogue during the all-media encompassing Art Deco period. In 1948 he became a part-time professor of applied graphics and decorative script at the Academy of Applied Arts in Belgrade.

He died in Belgrade in 1950.
