= Lithuania men's national junior ice hockey team =

Lithuania
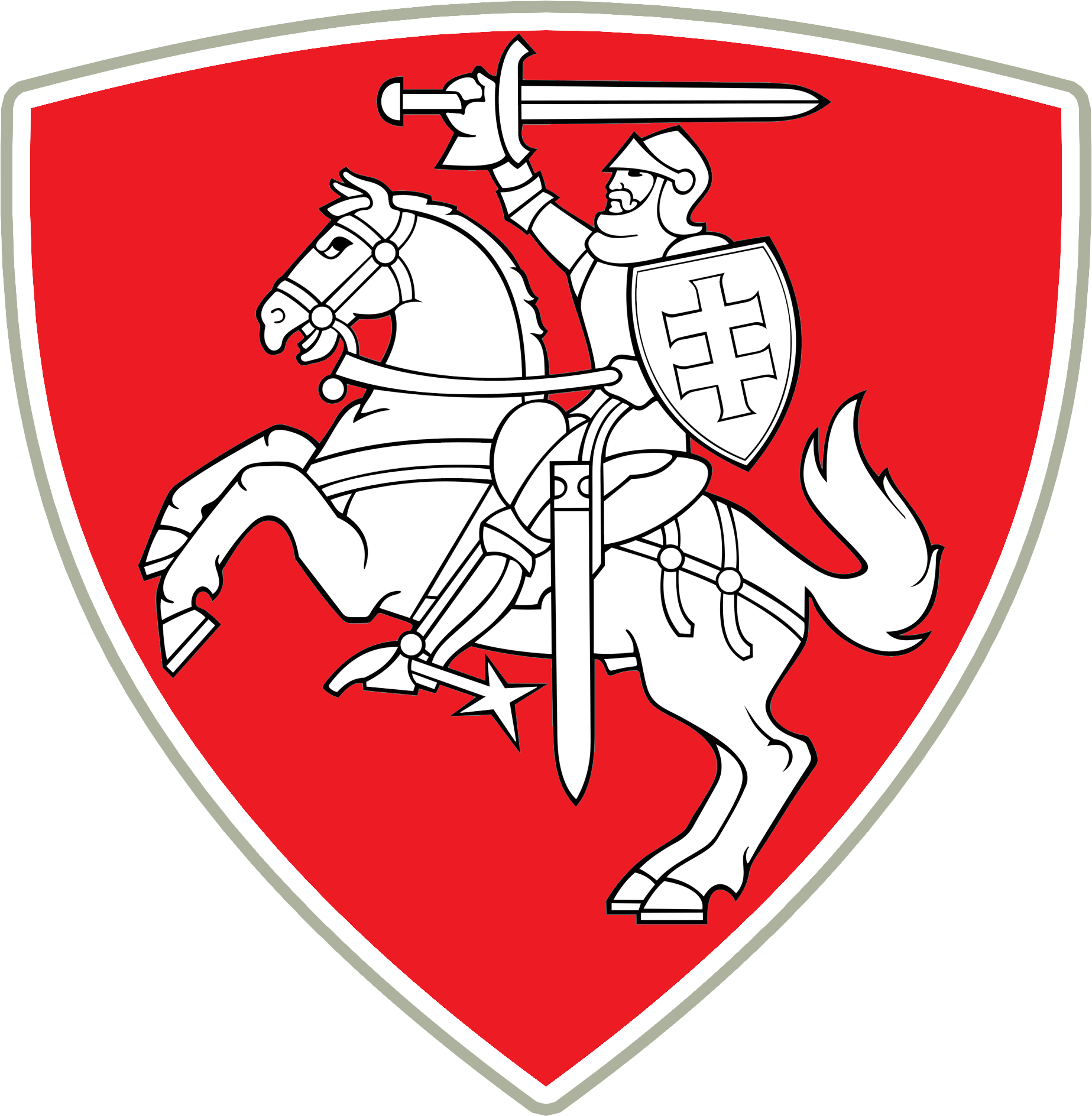
- The Lithuanian badge features Vytis ("the Chaser") who is also featured on the Coat of arms of Lithuania.
- Association: Lithuanian Ice Hockey Federation
- General manager: (Lithuania) Petras Nauseda
- Head coach: (Lithuania) Andrejus Jadkauskas
- Assistants: (Germany) Bernd Haake (Belarus) Gennadi Khutartsov
- Captain: Aivaras Bendzius
- Most points: Tadas Kumeliauskas (50)
- Team colors
- IIHF code: LTU

First international
- Ukraine 20 – 0 Lithuania (Riga, Latvia; 10 November 1992)

Biggest win
- Lithuania 47 – 1 Armenia (Elektrenai, Lithuania; 7 January 2006)

Biggest defeat
- Ukraine 20 – 0 Lithuania (Riga, Latvia; 10 November 1992)

IIHF World U20 Championship
- Appearances: 32 (first in 1993)
- Best result: 19th (2026)

International record (W–L–T)
- 41–42–1

The Lithuanian men's national under 20 ice hockey team is the national under-20 ice hockey team in Lithuania. The team represents Lithuania at the International Ice Hockey Federation's IIHF World U20 Championship.

== International competitions ==
- 1993 – 32nd overall (8th in Pool C Qualification)
- 1994 – Did not participate
- 1995 – 28th overall (4th in Pool C2)
- 1996 – 28th overall (8th in Pool D)
- 1997 – 28th overall (2nd in Pool D)
- 1998 – 25th overall (1st in Pool D)
- 1999 – 22nd overall (6th in Pool C)
- 2000 – 25th overall (7th in Pool C)
- 2001 – 21st overall (3rd in Division II)
- 2002 – 26th overall (8th in Division II)
- 2003 – 29th overall (4th in Division II, Group A)
- 2004 – 31st overall (5th in Division II, Group B)
- 2005 – 35th overall (1st in Division III)
- 2006 – 30th overall (4th in Division II, Group A)
- 2007 – 24th overall (1st in Division II, Group B)
- 2008 – 21st overall (6th in Division I, Group A)
- 2009 – 25th overall (2nd in Division II, Group A)
- 2010 – 23rd overall (1st in Division II, Group B)
- 2011 – 21st overall (6th in Division I, Group B)
- 2012 – 24th overall (2nd in Division IIA)
- 2013 – 27th overall (5th in Division IIA)
- 2014 – 24th overall (2nd in Division IIA)
- 2015 – 24th overall (2nd in Division IIA)
- 2016 – 24th overall (2nd in Division IIA)
- 2017 – 23rd overall (1st in Division IIA)
- 2018 – 22nd overall (6th in Division IB)
- 2019 – 24th overall (2nd in Division IIA)
- 2020 – 25th overall (3rd in Division IIA)
- 2021 – Cancelled due to the COVID-19 pandemic
- 2022 – 27th overall (5th in Division IIA)
- 2023 – 25th overall (3rd in Division IIA)
- 2024 – 24th overall (2nd in Division IIA)
- 2025 – 23rd overall (1st in Division IIA)
- 2026 – 19th overall (3rd in Division IB)
