= Mirko Djumic =

Serbian ice hockey player (born 1999)

- Born: 19 January 1999 (age 27) Budapest, Hungary
- Height: 183 cm (6 ft 0 in)
- Weight: 88 kg (194 lb; 13 st 12 lb)
- Position: Right wing
- Shoots: Right
- Erste Liga team Former teams: DVTK Jegesmedvék; HDD Jesenice; Budapest Jégkorong Akadémia HC; KH Energa Toruń; KH Zagłębie Sosnowiec; Dunaújvárosi Acélbikák
- National team: Serbia
- Playing career: 2017–present

Mirko Đumić (born 19 January 1999) is a Hungarian born Serbian professional ice hockey forward who plays for DVTK Jegesmedvék in the Erste Liga.
