= 2016 World Junior Ice Hockey Championships – Division I =

International ice hockey tournament

2016 IIHF U20 World Championship Division I

Tournament details
- Host countries: Austria; France
- Venues: 2 (in 2 host cities)
- Dates: 13–19 December 2015; 12–18 December 2015
- Teams: 11

The 2016 World Junior Ice Hockey Championship Division I was a pair of international under-20 ice hockey tournaments organized by the International Ice Hockey Federation. In each of the two groups, the participating teams played a round-robin tournament; the first-placed team was promoted to a higher level, while the last-placed team was relegated to a lower level. Divisions I A and I B represent the second and third tier of the World Junior Ice Hockey Championships. To be eligible as a "junior" a player couldn't be born earlier than 1996.

The winners of Division I A, Latvia, were promoted to the 2017 Top Division and the winners of Division I B, France, were promoted to the 2017 Division I A.

== Division I A ==
2016 IIHF U20 World Championship Division I A
Tournament details
- Host country: Austria
- City: Vienna
- Venue: 1 (in 1 host city)
- Dates: 13–19 December 2015
- Teams: 6

Tournament statistics
- Games played: 15
- Goals scored: 95 (6.33 per game)
- Attendance: 10,062 (671 per game)
- Scoring leader: (Austria) Dominic Zwerger (7 points)

Official website
- www.iihf.com

The Division I A tournament was played in Vienna, Austria, from 13 to 19 December 2015.

=== Participating teams ===
Team	Qualification
Germany	placed 10th in Top Division last year and were relegated
Norway	placed 2nd in Division I A last year
Latvia	placed 3rd in Division I A last year
Italy	placed 4th in Division I A last year
Austria	hosts; placed 5th in Division I A last year
Kazakhstan	placed 1st in Division I B last year and were promoted

=== Final standings ===
Pos	Team	Pld	W	OTW	OTL	L	GF	GA	GD	Pts	Promotion or relegation
1	Latvia	5	4	1	0	0	20	7	+13	14	Promoted to the 2017 Top Division
2	Austria (H)	5	3	0	0	2	18	18	0	9	
3	Kazakhstan	5	2	1	0	2	21	13	+8	8	
4	Norway	5	1	1	2	1	21	14	+7	7	
5	Germany	5	2	0	1	2	10	14	−4	7	
6	Italy	5	0	0	0	5	5	29	−24	0	Relegated to the 2017 Division I B

Source: IIHF
(H) Host

=== Match results ===
All times are local (Central European Time – UTC+1).

13 December 2015; 13:00	Kazakhstan	2–3 (0–0, 1–2, 1–1)	Germany	Eissportzentrum Kagran, Vienna; Attendance: 350

Game reference

Anton Bruyev
Goalies
Daniel Fiessinger
Referee:
(United Kingdom) Liam Sewell
Linesmen:
(Canada) Michael Johnstone
(Slovenia) Gasper Jaka Zganc

Asetov (Panyukov, Grents) – 23:20	1–0
	1–1	24:24 – Wissmann (Loibl, A. Eder) (PP)
	1–2	28:36 – A. Eder (Loibl, Mayenschein)
Presnov (Volkov) – 48:12	2–2
	2–3	58:05 – Wissmann (Loibl, A. Eder)

4 min
Penalties
12 min
29
Shots
21

13 December 2015; 16:30	Italy	1–10 (1–3, 0–2, 0–5)	Norway	Eissportzentrum Kagran, Vienna; Attendance: 325

Game reference

Simone Armand-Pilon
Goalies
Jonas Arntzen
Referee:
(Poland) Pawel Meszynski
Linesmen:
(Poland) Slawomir Szachniewicz
(Slovakia) Roman Vyleta

Mantinger (Marzolini) – 02:36	1–0
	1–1	11:03 – Ekaas (Jorgensen, Ostby)
	1–2	12:32 – Gulliksen (Gronstad, Bull)
	1–3	19:06 – Olsen (Nipe)
	1–4	23:41 – Nystuen
	1–5	29:03 – Ronnild (Berg)
	1–6	41:48 – Jorgensen (Bull, Nipe)
	1–7	43:38 – Knold (Gulliksen)
	1–8	52:17 – Johannesen (Ostby, Gulliksen)
	1–9	54:56 – Hoff (Nystuen, Gran)
	1–10	55:50 – Hoff (Kaasastul, Sateraas) (EA)

12 min
Penalties
14 min
17
Shots
60

13 December 2015; 20:00	Austria	2–6 (0–3, 1–3, 1–0)	Latvia	Eissportzentrum Kagran, Vienna; Attendance: 1048

Game reference

Stefan Muller
Goalies
Matiss Kivlenieks
Referee:
(Slovakia) Robert Mullner
Linesmen:
(United Kingdom) Ally Flockhart
(Belarus) Vasili Kaliada

	0–1	00:56 – Balcers (Zile, Cukste)
	0–2	09:43 – Sislannikovs (Razgals)
	0–3	16:49 – Zile (Puide, Buncis) (PP)
	0–4	22:43 – Galoha (Sislannikovs, Balcers)
Baltram (Zwerger, Kittinger) – 24:14	1–4
	1–5	32:03 – Sprukts (Razgals, Minajevs) (SH)
	1–6	38:32 – Buncis (Cukste)
Antonitsch (Hagen, Nussbaumer) – 53:15	2–6

8 min
Penalties
12 min
37
Shots
24

14 December 2015; 13:00	Germany	2–1 (1–0, 1–1, 0–0)	Italy	Eissportzentrum Kagran, Vienna; Attendance: 352

Game reference

Maximillian Franzreb
Goalies
Hannes Treibenreif
Referee:
(United States) Andrew Wilk
Linesmen:
(Belarus) Vasili Kaliada
(Slovakia) Roman Vyleta

A. Eder (Mayenschein) – 07:14	1–0
Mayenschein (Loibl, Rogl) – 25:09	2–0
	2–1	32:07 – Conci (Zanatta, Cordin)

6 min
Penalties
8 min
49
Shots
12

14 December 2015; 16:30	Latvia	5–3 (0–2, 1–0, 4–1)	Kazakhstan	Eissportzentrum Kagran, Vienna; Attendance: 253

Game reference

Matiss Kivlenieks
Goalies
Anton Bruyev
Referee:
(Poland) Pawel Meszynski
Linesmen:
(Canada) Michael Johnstone
(Poland) Slawomir Szachniewicz

	0–1	05:22 – Presnov (Volkov)
	0–2	09:03 – Grents (Panyukov) (PP)
Ponomarenko (Abols, Dzierkals) (PP) – 39:47	1–2
Dzierkals (Jansons) – 42:28	2–2
Razgals (Zile, Cukste) – 46:19	3–2
Lazarevs (Galoha) – 55:59	4–2
	4–3	57:08 – Asitov
Razgals (Sprukts) – 58:18	5–3

37 min
Penalties
10 min
30
Shots
29

14 December 2015; 20:00	Norway	3–4 (3–2, 0–0, 0–2)	Austria	Eissportzentrum Kagran, Vienna; Attendance: 914

Game reference

Jonas Arntzen
Goalies
Thomas Stroj
Referee:
(United Kingdom) Liam Sewell
Linesmen:
(Japan) Sotaro Yamaguchi
(Slovenia) Gasper Jaka Zganc

Ronnild (Olsen) – 01:55	1–0
	1–1	02:39 – Haudum (Wachter, Wolf)
	1–2	04:46 – Lahoda (Jakubitzka)
Jorgensen (Ekaas, Fladeby) – 13:58	2–2
Hoff (Johannesen, Ostby) (PP) – 15:30	3–2
	3–3	47:32 – Zwerger (Huber, Winkler)
	3–4	54:47 – Baltram (Zwerger) (PP)

8 min
Penalties
12 min
32
Shots
25

16 December 2015; 13:00	Norway	1–2 GWS (1–0, 0–1, 0–0) (OT: 0–0) (SO: 0–1)	Latvia	Eissportzentrum Kagran, Vienna; Attendance: 558

Game reference
Fredrik Gronstrand	Goalies	Matiss Kivlenieks	Referee: (United States) Andrew Wilk; Linesmen: (Canada) Michael Johnstone (Belarus) Vasili Kaliada
Knold (Nystuen, Ronnild) (PP) – 17:23 / 1–0; / 1–1 / 31:44 – Buncis (Puide, Cukste)			Referee: (United States) Andrew Wilk; Linesmen: (Canada) Michael Johnstone (Belarus) Vasili Kaliada
Hoff (miss); Knold (miss); Ekaas; Johannesen (miss); Ekaas (miss)	Shootout	(miss) Buncis; (miss) Dzierkals; Razgals; (miss) Egle; Abols	Referee: (United States) Andrew Wilk; Linesmen: (Canada) Michael Johnstone (Belarus) Vasili Kaliada
8 min	Penalties	8 min	Referee: (United States) Andrew Wilk; Linesmen: (Canada) Michael Johnstone (Belarus) Vasili Kaliada
31	Shots	36	Referee: (United States) Andrew Wilk; Linesmen: (Canada) Michael Johnstone (Belarus) Vasili Kaliada

16 December 2015; 16:30	Kazakhstan	7–0 (1–0, 5–0, 1–0)	Italy	Eissportzentrum Kagran, Vienna; Attendance: 346

Game reference

Anton Bruyev
Goalies
Hannes Treibenreif
Referee:
(Slovakia) Robert Mullner
Linesmen:
(United Kingdom) Ally Flockhart
(Japan) Sotaro Yamaguchi

Asetov (Grents, Panyukov) (PP) – 09:31	1–0
Lobanov (Grents) (PP2) – 26:47	2–0
Sentyushkin (Volkov) (PP) – 28:57	3–0
Asetov (Grents) (PP) – 34:13	4–0
Tolepbergen (Volkov) (PP) – 35:45	5–0
Neznamov (Panyukov) (SH) – 39:38	6–0
Borovikov (Shtefan, Volkov) – 45:00	7–0

6 min
Penalties
39 min
46
Shots
11

16 December 2015; 20:00	Germany	1–3 (0–1, 1–0, 0–2)	Austria	Eissportzentrum Kagran, Vienna; Attendance: 2246

Game reference

Daniel Fiessinger
Goalies
Thomas Stroj
Referee:
(Poland) Pawel Meszynski
Linesmen:
(Poland) Slawomir Szachniewicz
(Slovakia) Roman Vyleta

	0–1	16:28 – Zwerger (Huber, Baltram)
Loibl (Mayenschein, Schutz) – 28:18	1–1
	1–2	40:37 – Baltram (Huber) (SH)
	1–3	59:51 – Zwerger (Baltram) (EN)

2 min
Penalties
4 min
33
Shots
22

17 December 2015; 13:00	Norway	3–4 GWS (2–0, 1–2, 0–1) (OT: 0–0) (SO: 0–1)	Kazakhstan	Eissportzentrum Kagran, Vienna; Attendance: 168

Game reference

Fredrik Gronstrand
Goalies
Anton Bruyev
Referee:
(United Kingdom) Liam Sewell
Linesmen:
(Canada) Michael Johnstone
(Slovakia) Roman Vyleta

Nipe (Gronstad) – 05:37	1–0
Henriksen (Fladeby, Gronstad) – 16:05	2–0
	2–1	29:24 – Asetov
Jorgensen (Sateraas, Gulliksen) – 29:42	3–1
	3–2	32:59 – Asetov
	3–3	59:40 – Tolepbergen (Bykov, Lobanov) (EA)

Gulliksen
Hoff (miss)
Ekaas (miss)
Gulliksen (miss)
Olsen (miss)
Shootout
(miss) Grents
Asetov
(miss) Tolepbergen
(miss) Asetov
Volkov
2 min
Penalties
2 min
33
Shots
27

17 December 2015; 16:30	Latvia	4–1 (2–0, 1–1, 1–0)	Germany	Eissportzentrum Kagran, Vienna; Attendance: 307

Game reference

Matiss Kivlenieks
Goalies
Maximillian Franzreb
Referee:
(Slovakia) Robert Mullner
Linesmen:
(Belarus) Vasili Kaliada
(Slovenia) Gasper Jaka Zganc

Abols (Egle) – 03:15	1–0
Abols (Dzierkals) (PP) – 19:24	2–0
	2–1	29:20 – T. Eder (Napravnik, Schutz)
Buss (Minajevs) – 38:46	3–1
Lazarevs (Balinskis) (EN) – 58:57	4–1

2 min
Penalties
6 min
22
Shots
22

17 December 2015; 20:00	Italy	3–7 (0–1, 0–4, 3–2)	Austria	Eissportzentrum Kagran, Vienna; Attendance: 865

Game reference

Simone Armand Pilon
Hannes Treibenreif
Goalies
Stefan Muller
Referee:
(United States) Andrew Wilk
Linesmen:
(United Kingdom) Ally Flockhart
(Japan) Sotaro Yamaguchi

	0–1	05:15 – Wachter (Winkler, Haudum)
	0–2	22:24 – Lahoda (Maxa)
	0–3	24:23 – Gaffal (Kittinger, Kragl) (PP2)
	0–4	25:34 – Jakubitzka (Baltram, Zwerger)
	0–5	28:23 – Lahoda (Antonitsch, Maxa)
	0–6	42:49 – Antonitsch (Maxa, Lahoda)
Conci (Moroder, Zanatta) – 45:39	1–6
Thum (Basso) – 50:01	2–6
	2–7	53:13 – Antonitsch
Conci (Moroder, Zanatta) – 59:29	3–7

18 min
Penalties
22 min
13
Shots
30

19 December 2015; 13:00	Latvia	3–0 (1–0, 0–0, 2–0)	Italy	Eissportzentrum Kagran, Vienna; Attendance: 170

Game reference

Gustavs Grigals
Goalies
Hannes Treibenreif
Referee:
(Poland) Pawel Meszynski
Linesmen:
(United Kingdom) Ally Flockhart
(Japan) Sotaro Yamaguchi

Egle (Jansons) – 03:24	1–0
Galoha (Razgals) – 52:54	2–0
Abols (Dzierkals) (SH, EN) – 59:21	3–0

4 min
Penalties
10 min
51
Shots
6

19 December 2015; 16:30	Germany	3–4 GWS (0–0, 3–0, 0–3) (OT: 0–0) (SO: 0–1)	Norway	Eissportzentrum Kagran, Vienna; Attendance: 810

Game reference

Daniel Fiessinger
Goalies
Fredrik Gronstad
Referee:
(United States) Andrew Wilk
Linesmen:
(Canada) Michael Johnstone
(Poland) Slawomir Szachniewicz

Korner – 27:21	1–0
Edfelder (Wiederer, Haase) – 33:26	2–0
Napravnik (Korner, T. Eder) – 39:36	3–0
	3–1	45:01 – Knold (Gulliksen, Jorgensen)
	3–2	49:51 – Knold (Gulliksen, Sateraas)
	3–3	59:58 – Olsen (EA)

A. Eder (miss)
Kammmerer (miss)
Shootout
Knold
(miss) Jorgensen
Gulliksen
8 min
Penalties
12 min
25
Shots
20

19 December 2015; 20:00	Austria	2–5 (1–2, 0–2, 1–1)	Kazakhstan	Eissportzentrum Kagran, Vienna; Attendance: 1350

Game reference

Thomas Stroj
Goalies
Anton Bruyev
Referee:
(United Kingdom) Liam Sewell
Linesmen:
(Slovakia) Roman Vyleta
(Slovenia) Gaspar Jaka Zganc

	0–1	00:20 – Gents
	0–2	01:32 – Shtefan
Huber (Zwerger, Kirchschlager) – 19:40	1–2
	1–3	29:38 – Volkov (Neznamov, Tolepbergen) (PP)
	1–4	36:19 – Borovikov (Shtefan)
	1–5	47:58 – Shtefan (Demyanov) (PP)
Haudum (Wolf, Wachter) – 48:55	2–5

6 min
Penalties
6 min
21
Shots
20

=== Statistics ===
==== Top 10 scorers ====
Pos	Player	Country	GP	G	A	Pts	+/-	PIM
1	Dominic Zwerger	Austria	5	3	4	7	+2	2
2	Vladimir Volkov	Kazakhstan	5	2	5	7	–1	0
3	Alikhan Asetov	Kazakhstan	5	6	0	6	+2	0
4	Florian Baltram	Austria	5	3	3	6	+4	4
5	Dmitri Grents	Kazakhstan	5	2	4	6	+1	2
6	Anders Gulliksen	Norway	5	1	5	6	+4	0
7	Henrik Knold	Norway	5	5	0	5	+5	2
8	Rodrigo Ābols	Latvia	5	4	1	5	+1	0
9	Fredrik Jorgensen	Norway	5	3	2	5	+4	2
10	Frenks Razgals	Latvia	5	2	3	5	+5	0

==== Goaltending leaders ====
(minimum 40% team's total ice time)

Pos	Player	Country	MINS	GA	Sv%	GAA	SO
1	Matiss Kivlenieks	Latvia	245:00	7	94.12	1.71	0
2	Hannes Treibenreif	Italy	214:02	14	91.30	3.92	0
3	Fredrik Gronstrand	Norway	194:24	9	89.77	2.78	0
4	Thomas Stroj	Austria	180:00	9	89.41	3.00	0
5	Anton Bruyev	Kazakhstan	303:56	13	88.79	2.57	1

=== Awards ===
==== Best Players Selected by the Directorate ====
- Goaltender: (Latvia) Matiss Kivlenieks
- Defenceman: (Latvia) Karlis Cukste
- Forward: (Austria) Florian Baltram

== Division I B ==
2016 IIHF U20 World Championship Division I B
Tournament details
- Host country: France
- City: Megève
- Venue: 1 (in 1 host city)
- Dates: 12–18 December 2015
- Teams: 5

Tournament statistics
- Games played: 10
- Goals scored: 60 (6 per game)
- Attendance: 5,585 (559 per game)
- Scoring leader: (France) Bastien Maia (11 points)

Official website
- www.iihf.com

The Division I B tournament was played in Megève, France, from 12 to 18 December 2015.

On 10 December, it was announced that Japan had withdrawn, and would be automatically relegated for the 2017 tournament.

=== Participating teams ===
Team	Qualification
Slovenia	placed 6th in Division I A last year and were relegated
Ukraine	placed 2nd in Division I B last year
Poland	placed 3rd in Division I B last year
France	hosts; placed 4th in Division I B last year
~~Japan~~	placed 5th in Division I B last year; withdrew this year
Great Britain	placed 1st in Division II A last year and were promoted

=== Final standings ===
Pos	Team	Pld	W	OTW	OTL	L	GF	GA	GD	Pts	Promotion or relegation
1	France (H)	4	2	1	0	1	17	9	+8	8	Promoted to the 2017 Division I A
2	Poland	4	2	1	0	1	15	10	+5	8	
3	Great Britain	4	2	1	0	1	13	16	−3	8	
4	Ukraine	4	1	0	2	1	9	10	−1	5	
5	Slovenia	4	0	0	1	3	6	15	−9	1	
6	~~Japan~~	0	0	0	0	0	0	0	0	0	Withdrawn; relegated to the 2017 Division II A

Source: IIHF
(H) Host

=== Match results ===
All times are local (Central European Time – UTC+1).

12 December 2015; 15:30	Great Britain	3–2 OT (0–0, 0–1, 2–1) (OT: 1–0)	Slovenia	Palais des Sports, Megève; Attendance: 206

Game reference

Jordan Hedley
Goalies
Mark Vlahovic
Referee:
(Latvia) Juris Balodis
Linesmen:
(France) Thomas Caillot
(Czech Republic) Jiri Ondracek

	0-1	26:53 – Orehek (Macuh)
Keywood (Billing) (PP) – 43:43	1-1
Griffiths (Keywood, Bonner) – 44:56	2-1
	2-2	50:30 - Tarman (Unuk, Jezovsek)
Hook (Buglass, Stead) – 60:37	3-2

2 min
Penalties
10 min
34
Shots
35

12 December 2015; 19:00	France	3–2 OT (1–0, 1–2, 0–0) (OT: 1–0)	Ukraine	Palais des Sports, Megève; Attendance: 700

Game reference

Quentin Papillon
Goalies
Bogdan Dyachenko
Referee:
(Austria) Kristijan Nikolic
Linesmen:
(Kazakhstan) Vladimir Efremov
(Switzerland) Michael Tscherrig

Bastien Maia (LeClerc) – 19:49	1–0
	1–1	32:46 – Mazur (Aleksandrov, Tymchenko)
	1–2	33:17 – Radetsky (Svyshev, Vorona)
Colotti (Guillaume, Loic Chapelier) (SH) – 38:05	2–2
Colotti (Gallet, Maia) (PP) – 64:36	3–2

43 min
Penalties
8 min
44
Shots
22

13 December 2015; 15:30	Poland	9–3 (3–0, 3–1, 3–2)	Great Britain	Palais des Sports, Megève; Attendance: 128

Game reference

Michal Czernik
Goalies
Jordan Hedley
Ben Churchfield
Referee:
(Netherlands) Ramon Sterkens
Linesmen:
(France) Yann Furet
(Latvia) Viesturs Levalds

Sikora – 01:15	1–0
Lorek (Horzelski, Paszek) – 15:48	2–0
Krzemien (Jeziorski, Jaskiewicz) (PP) – 19:35	3–0
Horzelski (Paszek, Sikora) (PP) – 27:24	4–0
Wrobel (Goscinski, Skrodziuk) – 28:10	5–0
Goscinski (Falkenhagen) – 30:51	6–0
	6–1	32:34 – Antonov (Betteridge, Buglass) (PP)
Jaworski (Krzemien) – 40:10	7–1
Wrobel (Lorek) – 40:28	8–1
	8–2	44:32 – Forbes (Antonov) (PP)
	8–3	48:04 – Forbes (Antonov, Betteridge) (PP2)
Paszek (Horzelski, Sikora) – 52:53	9–3

16 min
Penalties
14 min
54
Shots
28

13 December 2015; 19:00	Slovenia	1–4 (0–1, 0–1, 1–2)	France	Palais des Sports, Megève; Attendance: 1030

Game reference

Mark Vlahovic
Goalies
Raphael Garnier
Referee:
(Sweden) Robert Hallin
Linesmen:
(Germany) Marcus Hoefer
(Czech Republic) Jiri Ondracek

	0–1	06:12 – LeClerc (Maia, Gallet)
	0–2	34:06 – Gallet (LeClerc, Maia) (PP)
Jezovsek (Cepon) – 43:08	1–2
	1–3	44:04 – Addamo (Colotti)
	1–4	59:22 – Colomban (Colotti) (ENG)

16 min
Penalties
35 min
23
Shots
31

15 December 2015; 15:30	Ukraine	0–1 OT (0–0, 0–0, 0–0) (OT: 0–1)	Poland	Palais des Sports, Megève; Attendance: 180

Game reference
Bogdan Dyachenko	Goalies	Michal Czernik	Referee: (Austria) Kristijan Nikolic; Linesmen: (France) Thomas Caillot (France) Yann Furet
0–1 / 64:21 – Jaskiewicz (Sikora)			Referee: (Austria) Kristijan Nikolic; Linesmen: (France) Thomas Caillot (France) Yann Furet
10 min	Penalties	6 min	Referee: (Austria) Kristijan Nikolic; Linesmen: (France) Thomas Caillot (France) Yann Furet
19	Shots	55	Referee: (Austria) Kristijan Nikolic; Linesmen: (France) Thomas Caillot (France) Yann Furet

15 December 2015; 19:00	Great Britain	4–3 (1–2, 1–1, 2–0)	France	Palais des Sports, Megève; Attendance: 1138

Game reference

Ben Churchfield
Goalies
Raphael Garnier
Referee:
(Latvia) Juris Balodis
Linesmen:
(Kazakhstan) Vladimir Efremov
(Germany) Marcus Hoefer

	0–1	00:37 – Leclerc (Ville)
	0–2	04:58 – Maia (Gallet, Ville) (PP2)
Johnson (McGiffin, Heywood) – 17:18	1–2
Hook (King) – 22:22	2–2
	2–3	33:34 – Maia (Leclerc) (SH)
Heywood (Betteridge) (PP) – 46:52	3–3
Betteridge (Hook, Forbes) (PP) – 59:29	4–3

20 min
Penalties
51 min
19
Shots
40

16 December 2015; 15:30	Ukraine	2–3 (1–0, 0–1, 1–2)	Great Britain	Palais des Sports, Megève; Attendance: 126

Game reference

Bogdan Dyachenko
Goalies
Ben Churchfield
Referee:
(Sweden) Robert Hallin
Linesmen:
(France) Vladimir Caillot
(Czech Republic) Jiri Ondracek

Vorona (Andreikiv, Radetsky) (PP) – 14:03	1–0
	1–1	34:40 – Stratford (Glossop)
	1–2	43:15 – Speirs (Buglass, Stead)
	1–3	49:50 – Heywood (Stead)
Radetsky (Mul, Andreikiv) (PP) – 54:20	2–3

2 min
Penalties
12 min
36
Shots
22

16 December 2015; 19:00	Poland	3–0 (0–0, 2–0, 1–0)	Slovenia	Palais des Sports, Megève; Attendance: 185

Game reference

Michal Czernik
Goalies
Mark Vlahovic
Referee:
(Netherlands) Ramon Sterkens
Linesmen:
(Latvia) Viesturs Levalds
(Switzerland) Michael Tscherrig

Sikora (Horzelski, Paszek) – 22:34	1–0
Skrodziuk (Michalowski, Matusik) – 23:10	2–0
Horzelski (Sikora) (PP) – 41:58	3–0

6 min
Penalties
20 min
30
Shots
24

18 December 2015; 15:30	Slovenia	3–5 (0–1, 1–3, 2–1)	Ukraine	Palais des Sports, Megève; Attendance: 103

Game reference

Urban Avsenik
Goalies
Bogdan Dyachenko
Referee:
(Netherlands) Ramon Sterkens
Linesmen:
(Kazakhstan) Vladimir Efremov
(France) Yann Furet

	0–1	05:12 – Tymchenko (Mazur, Grygoryev) (PP)
	0–2	24:46 – Vorona (PS)
	0–3	29:11 – Radetsky (Vorona, Andreikiv) (PP)
Avsenek (Subic) – 31:11	1–3
	1–4	33:02 – Vorona (Mazur, Svyshev)
	1–5	40:26 – Radetsky (Svyshev, Vorona) (PP)
Mercina (Simsic, Jeklic) (PP) – 54:13	2–5
Jeklic (Simsic, Mercina) (PP) – 56:51	3–5

12 min
Penalties
37 min
28
Shots
24

18 December 2015; 19:00	Poland	2–7 (0–1, 1–3, 1–3)	France	Palais des Sports, Megève; Attendance: 1789

Game reference

Michal Czernik
Goalies
Quentin Papillon
Referee:
(Austria) Kristijan Nikolic
Linesmen:
(Germany) Marcus Hoefer
(Switzerland) Michael Tscherrig

	0–1	15:42 – Colotti (Chapelier, Guillaume) (PP)
	0–2	25:36 – Maia
Jaworski (Jaskiewicz, Jeziorski) (PP) – 26:17	1–2
	1–3	28:32 – Ville (Maia)
	1–4	38:44 – Coulaud (Colomban, Thiry)
	1–5	45:52 – Maia (Coulaud, Ville) (PP)
Wrobel (Naparlo, Skokan) – 50:21	2–5
	2–6	51:18 – Guillaume (Colotti)
	2–7	59:25 – Maia (Ville, Leclerc)

12 min
Penalties
14 min
31
Shots
45

=== Statistics ===
==== Top 10 scorers ====
Pos	Player	Country	GP	G	A	Pts	+/-	PIM
1	Bastien Maia	France	4	6	5	11	+4	10
2	Fabien Colotti	France	4	3	3	6	+4	4
2	Olexi Vorona	Ukraine	4	3	3	6	0	0
4	Kamil Sikora	Poland	4	2	4	6	+5	4
5	Guillaume Leclerc	France	4	1	5	6	+4	2
6	Ivan Radetsky	Ukraine	4	4	1	5	0	0
7	Macaulay Heywood	Great Britain	4	3	2	5	-2	4
8	Gabin Ville	France	3	2	3	5	+4	29
9	Marcin Horzelski	Poland	4	2	3	5	+4	4
10	Oliver Betteridge	Great Britain	4	1	3	4	-2	0
10	Hugo Gallet	France	4	1	3	4	+5	4
10	Kamil Paszek	Poland	4	1	3	4	+5	0

GP = Games played; G = Goals; A = Assists; Pts = Points; +/− = P Plus–minus; PIM = Penalties In Minutes Source: IIHF.com

==== Goaltending leaders ====
(minimum 40% team's total ice time)

Pos	Player	Country	MINS	GA	Sv%	GAA	SO
1	Bogdan Dyachenko	Ukraine	247:16	10	93.29	2.43	0
2	Quentin Papillon	France	124:36	4	92.45	1.93	0
3	Ben Churchfield	Great Britain	149:09	8	92.16	3.22	0
4	Michal Czernik	Poland	244:04	10	91.38	2.46	2
5	Mark Vlahovic	Slovenia	178:44	9	90.43	3.02	0

Source: IIHF.com

=== Awards ===
==== Best Players Selected by the Directorate ====
- Goaltender: (Ukraine) Bogdan Dyachenko
- Defenceman: (Poland) Marcin Horzelski
- Forward: (France) Guillaume Leclerc
