= 2014 World Junior Ice Hockey Championships – Division II =

International ice hockey tournament

2014 IIHF U20 World Championship Division II

Tournament details
- Host countries: Hungary; Spain
- Venues: 2 (in 2 host cities)
- Dates: 15–21 December 2013; 11–17 January 2014
- Teams: 12

The 2014 World Junior Ice Hockey Championship Division II was a pair of international ice hockey tournaments organized by the International Ice Hockey Federation. Each of the two groups consisted of six teams; the first-placed teams were promoted to a higher level, while the last-placed teams were relegated to a lower level. Divisions II A and II B represent the fourth and the fifth tier of the World Junior Ice Hockey Championships.

== Division II A ==
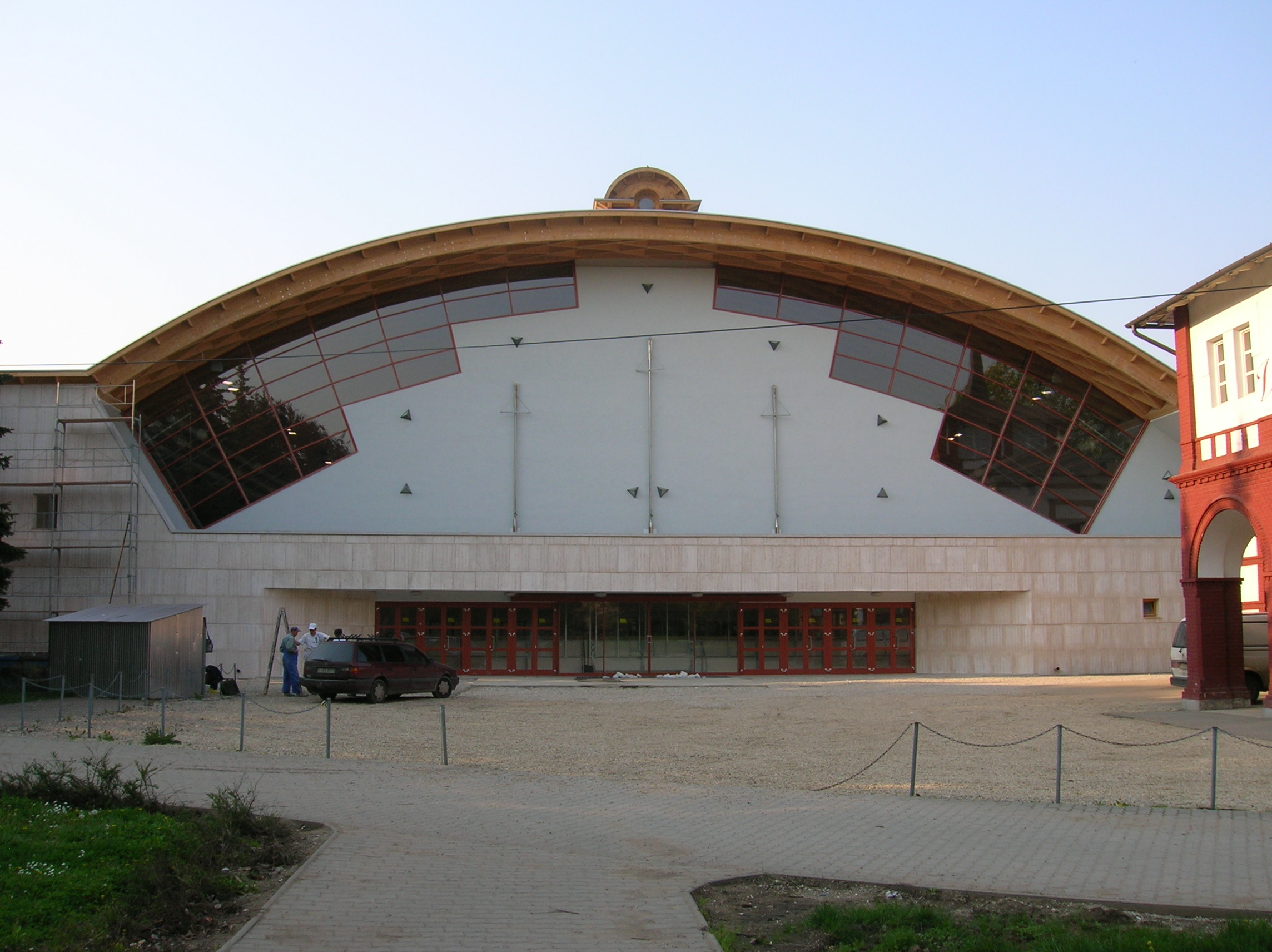
Miskolc Arena, host arena of 2014 Division II A tournament

The Division II A tournament was played in Miskolc, Hungary, from 15 to 21 December 2013.

=== Participating teams ===
Team	Qualification
Croatia	placed 6th in Division I B last year and were relegated
Hungary	hosts; placed 2nd in Division II A last year
Romania	placed 3rd in Division II A last year
Netherlands	placed 4th in Division II A last year
Lithuania	placed 5th in Division II A last year
Estonia	placed 1st in Division II B last year and were promoted

=== Final standings ===
Pos	Team	Pld	W	OTW	OTL	L	GF	GA	GD	Pts	Promotion or relegation
1	Hungary (H)	5	5	0	0	0	34	7	+27	15	Promoted to the 2015 Division I B
2	Lithuania	5	3	1	0	1	21	14	+7	11	
3	Netherlands	5	3	0	1	1	22	18	+4	10	
4	Estonia	5	2	0	0	3	11	19	−8	6	
5	Romania	5	1	0	0	4	8	20	−12	3	
6	Croatia	5	0	0	0	5	8	26	−18	0	Relegated to the 2015 Division II B

Source: IIHF
(H) Host

=== Match results ===
All times are local (Central European Time – UTC+1).

15 December 2013; 13:00	Estonia	1–4 (1–2, 0–0, 0–2)	Netherlands	Miskolc Arena; Attendance: 50

Game reference

Daniil Seppenen
Goalies
Mike Beeren
Referee:
(Denmark) Jens Christian Gregersen
Linesmen:
(Japan) Shunsuke Ichikawa
(Hungary) Attila Nagy

	0–1	06:00 – C. Staps (T. Ras, T. Marx) (PP)
D. Fursa (K. Parras) – 19:09	1–1
	1–2	19:34 – G. van Nes (D. Stempher, R. van der Schuit)
	1–3	45:12 – K. van Gorp (D. Stempher, R. van der Schuit)
	1–4	58:58 – C. Staps (EN)

10 min
Penalties
12 min
29
Shots
33

15 December 2013; 16:30	Hungary	5–1 (0–1, 0–0, 5–0)	Lithuania	Miskolc Arena; Attendance: 500

Game reference

Oliver Agoston
Goalies
Simas Baltrunas
Referee:
(France) Damien Bliek
Linesmen:
(Ukraine) Oleksandr Govorun
(Kazakhstan) Mergen Kaydarov

	0–1	04:35 – D. Nomanova
E. Keresztury (B. Sebok) – 40:55	1–1
F. Kocsis (A. Konczei, A. Reiter) (PP) – 43:33	2–1
V. Gallo (A. Konczei, L. Rito) – 52:31	3–1
C. Erdely (T. Laday, A. Konczei) (PP) – 53:41	4–1
A. Konczei (F. Kocsis, C. Erdely) (PP) – 59:35	5–1

10 min
Penalties
10 min
27
Shots
20

15 December 2013; 20:00	Romania	3–1 (1–1, 1–0, 1–0)	Croatia	Miskolc Arena; Attendance: 50

Game reference

Zoltan Toke
Goalies
Vlim Rosandic
Referee:
(Germany) Jens Steinecke
Linesmen:
(Norway) Havar Dahl
(Hungary) Marton Nemeth

	0–1	03:09 – M. Milicic (L. Ruzic, T. Boric)
S. Hildebrand (B. Peter, N. Rokalyn) – 14:26	1–1
M. Biro (G. Biro, C. Okos) (PP) – 35:48	2–1
G. Biro (M. Biro, N. Tamas) (EN) – 59:50	3–1

10 min
Penalties
14 min
42
Shots
22

16 December 2013; 13:00	Lithuania	5–2 (0–2, 3–0, 2–0)	Estonia	Miskolc Arena; Attendance: 50

Game reference

Simas Baltrunas
Goalies
Daniil Seppenen
Referee:
(Russia) Yuriy Oskirko
Linesmen:
(Norway) Havar Dahl
(Hungary) Marton Nemeth

	0–1	13:27 – M. Puzakov (M. Anohhin)
	0–2	16:38 – R.H. Russ (P. Kulakov)
M. Baltrukonis (D. Nomanovas) – 29:19	1–2
D. Bogdziul (SH) – 35:21	2–2
A. Fiscevas (P. Gintautas, D. Bogdziul) – 38:10	3–2
P. Gintautas (D. Bogdziul, A. Fiscevas) – 49:28	4–2
A. Fiscevas (D. Bogdziul, P. Gintautas) (EN) – 59:59	5–2

6 min
Penalties
10 min
49
Shots
29

16 December 2013; 16:30	Hungary	6–1 (1–1, 3–0, 2–0)	Romania	Miskolc Arena; Attendance: 600

Game reference

Gergely Arany
Goalies
Zoltan Toke
Referee:
(Denmark) Jens Christian Gregersen
Linesmen:
(Germany) Dominic Erdle
(Japan) Shunsuke Ichikawa

C. Erdely (F. Kocsis) – 00:39	1–0
	1–1	01:01 – A. Sillo (D. Dumitru, Z. Molnar)
C. Erdely (P. Vincze, K. Dosa) – 20:44	2–1
V. Gallo (A. Konczei, L. Rito) – 25:12	3–1
C. Erdely (T. Laday, A. Reiter) (PP) – 27:53	4–1
P. Vincze (C. Erdely, T. Laday) – 44:13	5–1
K. Nagy (V. Gallo) (PP) – 53:41	6–1

24 min
Penalties
14 min
40
Shots
25

16 December 2013; 20:00	Croatia	3–7 (1–2, 2–2, 0–3)	Netherlands	Miskolc Arena; Attendance: 50

Game reference

Vilim Rosandic
Goalies
Mike Beeren
Referee:
(France) Damien Bliek
Linesmen:
(Kazakhstan) Mergen Kaydarov
(Hungary) Attila Nagy

	0–1	10:37 – G. van Nes (D. Stempher, R. van der Schuit) (PP)
M. Plesko – 17:38	1–1
	1–2	19:43 – K. van Gorp (G. Vogelaar, R. van der Schuit) (PP)
	1–3	26:32 – T. Marx (J. Verkiel)
R. Cervecki (B. Kegalj) (PP) – 27:28	2–3
	2–4	30:58 – R. de Hondt (C. Staps) (PP2)
R. Skrapec (PP) – 33:55	3–4
	3–5	45:06 – R. de Hondt
	3–6	52:25 – R. van der Schuit (D. Stempher, G. van Nes)
	3–7	57:51 – D. Stempher (R. van der Schuit) (SH)

18 min
Penalties
38 min
26
Shots
41

18 December 2013; 13:00	Croatia	2–5 (1–2, 1–1, 0–2)	Lithuania	Miskolc Arena; Attendance: 60

Game reference

Ivan Stimac-Rojtinic
Goalies
Donatas Zukovas
Referee:
(Germany) Jens Steinecke
Linesmen:
(Ukraine) Oleksandr Govorun
(Hungary) Attila Nagy

M. Sakic (B. Kegalj, I. Jankovic) – 02:36	1–0
	1–1	03:27 – P. Gintautas (D. Bogdziul, A. Fiscevas)
	1–2	06:21 – D. Bogdziul (A. Fiscevas, E. Protcenko) (PP)
	1–3	29:13 – D. Bogdziul (E. Protcenko, J. Jasinevicius) (PP)
B. Kegalj (M. Milicic, L. Vukoja) (PP2) – 33:06	2–3
	2–4	42:55 – D. Bogdziul (D. Cypas, U. Cizas)
	2–5	44:23 – E. Protcenko (D. Cypas, D. Bogdziul) (PP)

18 min
Penalties
8 min
19
Shots
43

18 December 2013; 16:30	Hungary	8–2 (1–0, 4–1, 3–1)	Estonia	Miskolc Arena; Attendance: 450

Game reference

Referee:
(Russia) Yuriy Oskirko
Linesmen:
(Norway) Havar Dahl
(Germany) Dominic Erdle

A. Reisz (T. Sarpatki, K. Szabo) – 13:03	1–0
	1–1	24:03 – A. Kato (P. Kulakov, G. Vassiljev)
V. Gallo (T. Sarpatki, B. Sebok) (PP) – 26:15	2–1
T. Sarpatki (K. Nagy, P. Vincze) (PP) – 28:45	3–1
T. Sarpatki (V. Gallo, B. Sebok) – 35:08	4–1
K. Nagy (M. Arany) – 36:41	5–1
	5–2	47:11 – G. Vassiljev
L. Rito (SH) – 50:26	6–2
V. Gallo (T. Laday, A. Konczei) – 52:45	7–2
B. Sebok (V. Gallo) – 54:31	8–2

14 min
Penalties
10 min
56
Shots
27

18 December 2013; 20:00	Romania	2–5 (0–1, 0–0, 2–4)	Netherlands	Miskolc Arena; Attendance: 50

Game reference

Zoltan Toke
Goalies
Mike Beeren
Referee:
(Denmark) Jens Christian Gregersen
Linesmen:
(Japan) Shunsuke Ichikawa
(Hungary) Marton Nemeth

	0–1	19:39 – D. Stempher (R. van der Schuit, G. van Nes)
M. Biro (B. Peter, S. Hildebrand) – 45:00	1–1
	1–2	49:27 – R. de Hondt (B. van Gestel, R. van Haren)
M. Constantin (H. Bors, A. Sillo) – 50:37	2–2
	2–3	51:01 – R. de Hondt (C. Staps)
	2–4	55:14 – B. van Gestel (R. van Haren)
	2–5	56:49 – R. van der Schuit (SH)(EN)

8 min
Penalties
12 min
28
Shots
31

20 December 2013; 13:00	Lithuania	5–1 (4–1, 1–0, 0–0	Romania	Miskolc Arena; Attendance: 100

Game reference

Dontas Zukovas
Goalies
Attila Adorjan
Zoltan Toke
Referee:
(Germany) Jens Steinecke
Linesmen:
(Norway) Havar Dahl
(Germany) Dominic Erdle

A. Fiscevas (P. Gintautas, D. Bogdziul) – 00:44	1–0
I. Cetvertak (M. Baltrukonis, J. Jasinevicius) (PP2) – 03:06	2–0
A. Fiscevas (D. Nomanovas, M. Baltrukonis) (PP) – 04:25	3–0
	3–1	11:09 – S. Hildebrand (B. Peter, H. Bors) (PP)
E. Protcenko (D. Bogdziul, P. Gintautas) (PP) – 13:40	4–1
A. Fiscevas (D. Bogdziul, P. Gintautas) – 24:44	5–1

12 min
Penalties
18 min
42
Shots
31

20 December 2013; 16:30	Netherlands	2–7 (1–2, 1–3, 0–2)	Hungary	Miskolc Arena; Attendance: 800

Game reference

Mike Beeren
Goalies
Oliver Agoston
Referee:
(Russia) Yuriy Oskirko
Linesmen:
(Ukraine) Oleksandr Govorun
(Kazakhstan) Mergen Kaydarov

T. Ras (C. Staps) (PP) – 05:32	1–0
	1–1	15:03 – E. Keresztury
	1–2	15:39 – A. Konczei (B. Sebok, V. Gallo)
	1–3	26:24 – B. Stipsicz (A. Konczei)
R. van der Schuit (D. Stempher) (PP) – 31:20	2–3
	2–4	36:23 – V. Gallo (B. Sebok, P. Vincze) (PP)
	2–5	39:56 – G. Korbuly (F. Kocsis)
	2–6	45:14 – C. Erdely (A. Reiter, T. Laday) (PP)
	2–7	53:17 – V. Gallo (B. Sebok)

12 min
Penalties
10 min
31
Shots
45

20 December 2013; 20:00	Estonia	3–1 (0–1, 1–0, 2–0)	Croatia	Miskolc Arena; Attendance: 40

Game reference

Daniil Seppenen
Goalies
Vilim Rosandic
Referee:
(France) Damien Bliek
Linesmen:
(Hungary) Attila Nagy
(Hungary) Marton Nemeth

	0–1	17:33 – I. Jankovic (B. Kegalj) (PP)
M. Tugo (P. Kulakov) – 28:09	1–1
R.H. Russ (D. Fursa) – 48:19	2–1
S. Kerna (R.H. Russ) – 56:33	3–1

36 min
Penalties
43 min
41
Shots
45

21 December 2013; 13:00	Netherlands	4–5 OT (1–1, 0–2, 3–1) (OT: 0–1)	Lithuania	Miskolc Arena; Attendance: 50

Game reference

Mike Beeren
Goalies
Simas Baltrunas
Referee:
(Germany) Jens Steinecke
Linesmen:
(Kazakhstan) Mergen Kaydarov
(Hungary) Marton Nemeth

	0–1	10:14 – E. Protcenko (D. Cypas, D. Bogdziul) (PP)
J. Knoren (J. Verkiel, G. van Nes) – 16:24	1–1
	1–2	28:16 – D. Cypas (P. Gintautas, D. Bogdziul) (PP)
	1–3	34:56 – D. Bogdziul (P. Gintautas, E. Protcenko) (SH)
D. Stempher (R. van der Schuit, K. van Gorp) – 40:33	2–3
	2–4	46:35 – P. Gintautas (D. Cypas, A. Fiscevas) (PP)
R. van der Schuit (R. van Hoorn, K. van Gorp) – 56:49	3–4
D. Stempher (R. van der Schuit, T. Marx) – 59:34	4–4
	4–5	62:42 – D. Cypas (I. Cetvertak, U. Cizas) (PP)

28 min
Penalties
12 min
42
Shots
29

21 December 2013; 16:30	Romania	1–3 (0–0, 0–2, 1–1)	Estonia	Miskolc Arena; Attendance: 100

Game reference

Attila Adorjan
Goalies
Daniil Seppenen
Referee:
(France)
Linesmen:
(Japan) Shunsuke Ichikawa
(Hungary) Attila Nagy

	0–1	32:57 – P. Kulakov (K. Ljubobratets) (PP)
	0–2	39:32 – G. Vassiljev (M. Terna)
	0–3	44:51 – G. Vassiljev (K. Ljubobratets, P. Kulakov) (PP)
M. Biro (D. Dumitru) – 47:15	1–3

20 min
Penalties
20 min
40
Shots
35

21 December 2013; 20:00	Croatia	1–8 (1–1, 0–3, 0–4)	Hungary	Miskolc Arena; Attendance: 1000

Game reference

Ivan Stimac-Rojtinic
Goalies
Gergely Arany
Referee:
(Denmark) Jens Christian Gregersen
Linesmen:
(Germany) Dominic Erdle
(Ukraine) Oleksandr Govorun

	0–1	04:55 – V. Gallo (R. Vokla, A. Konczei)
R. Platuzic (PP2) – 08:38	1–1
	1–2	23:14 – L. Rito (A. Reisz, E. Keresztury)
	1–3	25:28 – C. Erdely
	1–4	26:57 – L. Rito (Z. Garat, E. Keresztury)
	1–5	40:10 – K. Szabo (T. Sarpatki, Attila Reiter)
	1–6	46:05 – A. Konczei (C. Erdely, T. Laday) (PP)
	1–7	56:59 – T. Laday (A. Konczei, A. Reiter) (PP)
	1–8	57:51 – T. Laday (R. Vokla, K. Dosa)

4 min
Penalties
6 min
22
Shots
49

=== Statistics ===
==== Top 10 scorers ====
Pos	Player	Country	GP	G	A	Pts	+/-	PIM
1	Daniel Bogdziul	Lithuania	5	5	10	15	+8	2
2	Vilmos Gallo	Hungary	5	7	4	11	+10	0
3	Raymond van der Schuit	Netherlands	5	4	7	11	+5	10
4	Aron Konczei	Hungary	5	3	8	11	+8	6
5	Danny Stempher	Netherlands	5	4	6	10	+5	6
6	Paulius Gintautas	Lithuania	5	3	7	10	+6	0
7	Csanad Erdely	Hungary	5	6	3	9	+3	2
8	Aimas Fiscevas	Lithuania	5	5	4	9	+5	2
9	Tamas Laday	Hungary	5	2	5	7	+7	6
10	Balzas Sebok	Hungary	4	1	6	7	+5	8

==== Goaltending leaders ====
(minimum 40% team's total ice time)

Pos	Player	Country	MINS	GA	Sv%	GAA	SO
1	Gergely Arany	Hungary	180:00	4	94.67	1.33	0
2	Oliver Agoston	Hungary	120:00	3	94.12	1.50	0
3	Daniil Seppenen	Estonia	276:46	14	93.30	3.04	0
4	Vilim Rosandic	Croatia	176:38	12	90.32	4.08	0
5	Simas Baltrunas	Lithuania	182:42	11	88.78	4.58	0

=== Awards ===
==== Best Players Selected by the Directorate ====
- Goaltender: (Hungary) Oliver Agoston
- Defenceman: (Netherlands) Kilian van Gorp
- Forward: (Lithuania) Daniel Bogdziul

==== Best players of each team selected by the coaches ====
- (Croatia) Luka Vukoja
- (Estonia) Daniil Seppenen
- (Hungary) Vilmos Gallo
- (Lithuania) Daniel Bogdziul
- (Netherlands) Tom Marx
- (Romania) Huba Bors

== Division II B ==
The Division II B tournament was played in Jaca, Spain, from 11 to 17 January 2014.

=== Participating teams ===
Team	Qualification
Spain	hosts; placed 6th in Division II A last year and were relegated
South Korea	placed 2nd in Division II B last year
Serbia	placed 3rd in Division II B last year
Australia	placed 4th in Division II B last year
Iceland	placed 5th in Division II B last year
China	placed 1st in Division III last year and were promoted

=== Final standings ===
Pos	Team	Pld	W	OTW	OTL	L	GF	GA	GD	Pts	Promotion or relegation
1	South Korea	5	5	0	0	0	41	12	+29	15	Promoted to the 2015 Division II A
2	Spain (H)	5	4	0	0	1	19	11	+8	12	
3	Serbia	5	3	0	0	2	15	15	0	9	
4	Australia	5	1	1	0	3	12	19	−7	5	
5	Iceland	5	1	0	1	3	20	19	+1	4	
6	China	5	0	0	0	5	9	40	−31	0	Relegated to the 2015 Division III

Source: IIHF
(H) Host

=== Match results ===
All times are local (Central European Time – UTC+1).

11 January 2014; 13:00	South Korea	6–4 (0–0, 5–2, 1–2)	Iceland	Pabellón de Hielo; Attendance: 440

Game reference

Lee Yeonseung
Goalies
Atli Valdimarsson
Referee:
(Belarus) Petr Amosov
Linesmen:
(Spain) Sergio Biec
(Spain) Carlos Trobajo

Lee C. (Jeon J., Yoon J.) – 22:04	1–0
	1–1	25:12 – S. Snorrason (S. Ingason, A. Helgason) (PP2)
Kim H. (Lee S.) – 30:23	2–1
	2–2	34:06 – A. Helgason (B. Sigurdarson)
Hwang D.H. (Kim G., Jeon J.) (SH) – 38:29	3–2
Seo Y. (Lee D.) (PP) – 38:57	4–2
Yoon J. (PP) – 39:59	5–2
	5–3	40:16 – S. Snorrason (B. Bergmann)
	5–4	52:54 – B. Bergmann (S. Snorrason)
Seo Y. (Kim Y., Jeon J.) (PP) – 58:31	6–4

18 min
Penalties
14 min
37
Shots
34

11 January 2014; 16:30	China	3–5 (1–3, 2–2, 0–0)	Australia	Pabellón de Hielo; Attendance: 650

Game reference

Xia Shengrong
Goalies
Fraser Carson
Referee:
(Kazakhstan) Eduard Ibatulin
Linesmen:
(Finland) Henri Neva
(Lithuania) Vladislovas Rudzinskas

	0–1	06:47 – C. Kubara (T. Kubara)
Zhang Z. (Li H.) – 07:30	1–1
	1–2	13:20 – C. Todd (C. Kubara)
	1–3	14:21 – K. Fedor (T. Kubara)
Zuo T. (Lu H.) – 25:38	2–3
Liu Q. (Li H.) – 30:22	3–3
	3–4	32:38 – C. Todd (C. Kubara)
	3–5	36:27 – K. Fedor (T. Kubara, S. Tobin)

12 min
Penalties
10 min
29
Shots
45

11 January 2014; 20:30	Serbia	1–2 (0–2, 1–0, 0–0)	Spain	Pabellón de Hielo; Attendance: 2,500

Game reference

Aleksandar Fat
Jovan Feher
Goalies
Ignacio Garcia
Referee:
(United Kingdom) Dean Smith
Linesmen:
(Austria) Florian Hofer
(Belgium) Maarten van den Acker

	0–1	04:17 – A. Carbonell (G. Gonzalez)
	0–2	10:03 – G. Gonzalez (A. Carbonell) (PP)
U. Novakovic (U. Bjelogrlic, S. Boskovic) (PP) – 39:03	1–2

14 min
Penalties
20 min
21
Shots
38

12 January 2014; 13:00	Iceland	8–1 (3–0, 3–0, 2–1)	China	Pabellón de Hielo

Game reference

Nicolas Jouanne
Goalies
Xia Shengrong
Referee:
(Netherlands) Martin de Wilde
Linesmen:
(Austria) Florian Hofer
(Belgium) Maarten van den Acker

B. Bergmann – 06:30	1–0
D.H. Magnusson (K. Gudlaugsson, B. Johannesson) – 13:00	2–0
F. Gudnason (B. Sigurdarson) – 17:00	3–0
A. Helgason (B. Bergman, B. Sigurdarson) (PP) – 21:00	4–0
B. Sigurdarson (D.S. Magnusson) – 21:50	5–0
B. Sigurdarson (I. Arnason) – 25:22	6–0
	6–1	44:21 – Wu J. (Lu H., Zhang Z.)
I. Arnason (B. Sigurdarson, H. Sigrunarson) (PP) – 48:01	7–1
A. Helgason – 56:02	8–1

26 min
Penalties
36 min
55
Shots
19

12 January 2014; 16:30	South Korea	6–2 (1–0, 1–1, 4–1)	Serbia	Pabellón de Hielo; Attendance: 450

Game reference

Kim Kweonyoung
Goalies
Jovan Feher
Referee:
(Kazakhstan) Eduard Ibatulin
Linesmen:
(Spain) Sergio Biec
(Spain) Carlos Trobajo

Seo Y. (Lee S., Lee D.) (PP) – 16:04	1–0
	1–1	23:45 – L. Lestaric (U. Novakovic) (PP)
Seo Y. (Lee S.) (PP) – 28:26	2–1
	2–2	44:52 – D. Terzic (D. Plavsic, B. Ignjatovic)
Lee D. (Lee K.s., Kim G.) (PP2) – 52:52	3–2
Kim H. (Chun S., Hwang D.H.) (PP) – 53:26	4–2
Hwang Y. (Kim H.) – 54:12	5–2
Lee C. (Seo Y.) – 54:54	6–2

32 min
Penalties
20 min
36
Shots
19

12 January 2014; 20:00	Spain	4–1 (1–0, 1–0, 2–1)	Australia	Pabellón de Hielo; Attendance: 2,400

Game reference

Ignacio Garcia
Goalies
Fraser Carson
Referee:
(Belarus) Petr Amosov
Linesmen:
(Romania) Mihai Butucel
(Finland) Henri Neva

A. Garcia (A. Fernandez-Pola) – 11:37	1–0
A. Carbonell (I. Solorzano, P. Fuentes) – 23:39	2–0
M. Garcia (P. Fuentes) (PP) – 40:31	3–0
I. Solorzano (P. Fuentes) – 55:14	4–0
	4–1	59:22 – C. Todd (C. Kubara, K. Fedor)

14 min
Penalties
14 min
33
Shots
19

14 January 2014; 13:00	Serbia	3–2 (1–1, 2–1, 0–0)	Australia	Pabellón de Hielo; Attendance: 103

Game reference

Jovan Feher
Goalies
Fraser Carson
Referee:
(United Kingdom) Dean Smith
Linesmen:
(Spain) Sergio Biec
(Spain) Carlos Trobajo

N. Kerezovic – 00:39	1–0
	1–1	04:29 – S. Tobin (K. Fedor, J. Woodman) (PP)
A. Zwick (S. Pajic) (PP) – 25:07	2–1
A. Zwick (S. Pajic) – 32:27	3–1
	3–2	39:59 – T. Kubara (S. Tobin, K. Fedor) (PP)

10 min
Penalties
10 min
41
Shots
25

14 January 2014; 16:30	South Korea	17–2 (5–0, 4–0, 8–2)	China	Pabellón de Hielo; Attendance: 250

Game reference

Lee Yeonseung
Goalies
Yu Qingchen
Referee:
(Belarus) Petr Amosov
Linesmen:
(Romania) Mihai Butucel
(Austria) Florian Hofer

Seo Y. (Lee D.) (PP) – 01:10	1–0
Choi Y. (Lee K.s.) – 03:08	2–0
Lee S. (Kim H.) – 04:10	3–0
Kim H. – 04:16	4–0
Lee K.m. (Seo Y., Hwang D.H.) (PP) – 19:30	5–0
Lee S. (Seo Y., Hwang D.H.) – 24:59	6–0
Lee D. (Kim H.) – 27:25	7–0
Seo Y. (Lee D.) (PP2) – 29:26	8–0
Seo Y. (Lee S., Kim Y.) (PP2) – 38:00	9–0
Hwang D.H. (Choi Y.) – 42:22	10–0
Jung J. (Hwang D.H.) (PP) – 46:02	11–0
Choi Y. (Kim Y.K.) (PP) – 47:27	12–0
	12–1	48:01 – Yue X.
Kim G. (Jeon J.) – 48:50	13–1
	13–2	50:36 – Liu Y. (Zhang C.) (PP)
Seo Y. – 53:14	14–2
Lee D. (Kim H.) – 56:30	15–2
Lee S. – 57:21	16–2
Kim Y. (Lee C.) – 58:54	17–2

45 min
Penalties
45 min
51
Shots
28

14 January 2014; 20:00	Spain	6–4 (4–1, 1–3, 1–0)	Iceland	Pabellón de Hielo; Attendance: 2,500

Game reference

Ignacio Garcia
Goalies
Atli Valdimarsson
Nicolas Jouanne
Referee:
(Netherlands) Martin de Wilde
Linesmen:
(Lithuania) Vladislovas Ruszinskas
(Belgium) Maarten van den Acker

J. Burgos (I. Gainza, P. Fuentes) (PP) – 02:23	1–0
I. Solorzano (A. Palacios, P. Fuentes) – 08:19	2–0
A. Palacios (C. Rivero, G. Gonzalez) (PP2) – 12:12	3–0
C. Rivero (A. Carbonell, I. Solorzano) (PP) – 14:17	4–0
	4–1	18:27 – A. Helgason (F. Gudnason) (PP)
	4–2	23:42 – F. Gudnarson (PS)
A. Carbonell (P. Fuentes, C. Rivero) (PP) – 32:19	5–2
	5–3	38:09 – I. Arnason (B. Bergmann, F. Gudnason) (PP)
	5–4	39:35 – F. Gudnason (A. Helgason, B. Bergmann)
A. Carbonell (I. Gainza) – 58:24	6–4

18 min
Penalties
18 min
35
Shots
44

15 January 2014; 13:00	Australia	2–8 (0–5, 1–3, 1–0)	South Korea	Pabellón de Hielo; Attendance: 73

Game reference

Fraser Carson
Rhett Kelly
Goalies
Kim Kweonyoung
Referee:
(Netherlands) Martin de Wilde
Linesmen:
(Romania) Mihai Butucel
(Spain) Carlos Trobajo

	0–1	01:10 – Lee S. (Kim H., Seo Y.)
	0–2	01:28 – Lee C. (Yoon J., Jeon J.)
	0–3	03:03 – Lee D. (Kim Y.)
	0–4	06:42 – Lee C. (Jeon J., Yoon J.)
	0–5	11:48 – Kim H. (Lee S., Kim Y.)
	0–6	22:22 – Yoon J. (Kim G.)
C. Todd (J. Woodman) – 24:53	1–6
	1–7	33:42 – Seo Y. (Lee D., Choi Y.)
	1–8	35:22 – Lee S. (Lee D., Seo Y.)
S. Tobin (T. Kubara, S. Clemie) – 50:17	2–8

2 min
Penalties
14 min
31
Shots
65

15 January 2014; 16:30	Iceland	3–4 (1–0, 1–3, 1–1)	Serbia	Pabellón de Hielo; Attendance: 250

Game reference

Atli Valdmarsson
Goalies
Jovan Feher
Referee:
(United Kingdom) Dean Smith
Linesmen:
(Finland) Henri Neva
(Lithuania) Vladislovas Rudzinskas

D.H. Magnusson (K. Gudlaugsson, F. Gudnason) – 14:26	1–0
	1–1	23:16 – P. Podunavac (S. Pajic, A. Zwick) (PP)
	1–2	33:20 – R. Radosavljevic (P. Podunavac, A. Zwick)
	1–3	37:26 – R. Radosavljevic (I. Anic) (PP)
B. Sigurdarson (D.S. Magnusson, A. Knutsson) – 37:52	2–3
B. Sigurdarson (A. Helgason, I. Arnason) (PP) – 52:12	3–3
	3–4	54:25 – A. Zwick (S. Pajic, P. Novakovic)

24 min
Penalties
30 min
26
Shots
35

15 January 2014; 20:00	China	1–5 (1–2, 0–2, 0–1)	Spain	Pabellón de Hielo; Attendance: 1,623

Game reference

Xia Shengrong
Goalies
Ignacio Garcia
Referee:
(Kazakhstan) Eduard Ibatulin
Linesmen:
(Austria) Florian Hofer
(Belgium) Maarten van den Acker

Ji P. (Zhu Z., Xiang X.) – 03:11	1–0
	1–1	05:31 – D. Alvarez (P. Cerda)
	1–2	07:20 – A. Carbonell (I. Gainza)
	1–3	26:04 – P. Fuentes
	1–4	39:55 – A. Palacios (P. Pantoja, D. Medrano) (PP)
	1–5	59:45 – P. Fuentes (D. Medrano, O. Rubio)

28 min
Penalties
37 min
24
Shots
44

17 January 2014; 13:00	Serbia	5–2 (0–1, 0–0, 5–1)	China	Pabellón de Hielo; Attendance: 40

Game reference

Jovan Feher
Goalies
Xia Shengrong
Referee:
(Netherlands) Martin de Wilde
Linesmen:
(Romania) Mihai Butucel
(Belgium) Maarten van den Acker

	0–1	03:04 – Ji P. (Xiang X.)
	0–2	43:16 – Zhang Ze. (Zhang Z.) (PP)
A. Babic (S. Boskovic) – 44:40	1–2
U. Novakovic (S. Boskovic, A. Zwick) (SH) – 52:15	2–2
L. Lestaric (S. Boskovic) (PP) – 54:26	3–2
I. Anic (B. Ignjatovic, D. Plavsic) – 58:43	4–2
I. Anic (U. Bjelogrlic) (SH) – 59:46	5–2

6 min
Penalties
4 min
47
Shots
18

17 January 2014; 16:30	Australia	2–1 GWS (0–1, 1–0, 0–0) (OT: 0–0) (SO: 2–0)	Iceland	Pabellón de Hielo; Attendance: 600

Game reference
Fraser Carson	Goalies	Nicolas Jouanne	Referee: (Kazakhstan) Eduard Ibatulin; Linesmen: (Spain) Sergio Biec (Lithuania) Vladislovas Rudzinskas
/ 0–1 / 10:04 – S. Snorrason (A. Helgason, S. Ingason) (PP); K. Fedor (T. Kubara) – 34:23 / 1–1			Referee: (Kazakhstan) Eduard Ibatulin; Linesmen: (Spain) Sergio Biec (Lithuania) Vladislovas Rudzinskas
T. Sak; C. Kubara (miss); K. Fedor	Shootout	(miss) A. Helgason; (miss) B. Sigurdarson	Referee: (Kazakhstan) Eduard Ibatulin; Linesmen: (Spain) Sergio Biec (Lithuania) Vladislovas Rudzinskas
12 min	Penalties	30 min	Referee: (Kazakhstan) Eduard Ibatulin; Linesmen: (Spain) Sergio Biec (Lithuania) Vladislovas Rudzinskas
28	Shots	54	Referee: (Kazakhstan) Eduard Ibatulin; Linesmen: (Spain) Sergio Biec (Lithuania) Vladislovas Rudzinskas

17 January 2014; 20:00	Spain	2–4 (2–2, 0–1, 0–1)	South Korea	Pabellón de Hielo; Attendance: 2200

Game reference

Ignacio Garcia
Goalies
Kim Kweonyoung
Referee:
(United Kingdom) Dean Smith
Linesmen:
(Austria) Florian Hofer
(Finland) Henri Neva

J. Burgos (A. Palacios, A. Carbonell) (PP) – 08:36	1–0
	1–1	13:59 – Seo Y. (Lee D., Kim H.) (PP)
J. Vea (P. Fuentes, I. Solorzano) (PP) – 17:16	2–1
	2–2	19:38 – Kim H. (Kim Y., Seo Y.) (PP)
	2–3	38:54 – Yoon J. (Lee C.)
	2–4	45:12 – Seo Y. (Kim G., Lee S.) (PP2)

30 min
Penalties
18 min
44
Shots
40

=== Statistics ===
==== Top 10 scorers ====
Pos	Player	Country	GP	G	A	Pts	+/-	PIM
1	Seo Yeongjun	South Korea	5	11	5	16	+11	0
2	Kim Hyungkyeum	South Korea	5	5	7	12	+12	2
3	Lee Dounggun	South Korea	5	4	8	12	+10	8
4	Lee Seunghyuk	South Korea	5	5	6	11	+10	6
5	Alejandro Carbonell	Spain	5	5	4	9	+4	4
6	Patricio Fuentes	Spain	5	2	7	9	+4	0
7	Andri Helgason	Iceland	5	4	4	8	+2	12
8	Bjorn Sigurdarson	Iceland	5	4	4	8	+7	6
9	Lee Chongjae	South Korea	5	4	2	6	+5	8
10	Kayne Fedor	Australia	4	3	3	6	+2	2

==== Goaltending leaders ====
(minimum 40% team's total ice time)

Pos	Player	Country	MINS	GA	Sv%	GAA	SO
1	Kim Kweonyoung	South Korea	180:00	6	93.62	2.00	0
2	Fraser Carson	Australia	270:06	12	93.30	2.67	0
3	Ignacio Garcia	Spain	300:00	11	92.57	2.20	0
4	Nicolas Jouanne	Iceland	171:46	13	91.30	2.10	0
5	Jovan Feher	Serbia	289:29	13	90.58	2.69	0

=== Awards ===
==== Best Players Selected by the Directorate ====
- Goaltender: (Spain) Ignacio Garcia
- Defenceman: (South Korea) Seo Yeongjun
- Forward: (Spain) Alejandro Carbonell

==== Best players of each team selected by the coaches ====
- (Australia) James Byers
- (China) Zhang Cheng
- (Spain) Patricio Fuentes
- (Iceland) Bjorn Sigurdarson
- (South Korea) Seo Yeongjun
- (Serbia) Jovan Feher
