= 2015 World Junior Ice Hockey Championships – Division II =

International ice hockey tournament

2015 IIHF U20 World Championship Division II

Tournament details
- Host countries: Estonia; Spain
- Venues: 2 (in 2 host cities)
- Dates: 7–13 December 2014; 13–19 December 2014
- Teams: 12

The 2015 IIHF Ice Hockey U20 World Championship Division II was a pair of international ice hockey tournaments organized by the International Ice Hockey Federation. Division II A was contested in Tallinn, Estonia and Division II B in Jaca, Spain. These tournaments represent the fourth and fifth tiers of the World Junior Ice Hockey Championships.

== Division II A ==
The Division II A tournament was played in Tallinn, Estonia, from 7 to 13 December 2014.

=== Participating teams ===
Team	Qualification
Great Britain	disqualified in Division I B last year and were relegated
Lithuania	placed 2nd in Division II A last year
Netherlands	placed 3rd in Division II A last year
Estonia	hosts; placed 4th in Division II A last year
Romania	placed 5th in Division II A last year
South Korea	placed 1st in Division II B last year and were promoted

=== Final standings ===
Pos	Team	Pld	W	OTW	OTL	L	GF	GA	GD	Pts	Promotion or relegation
1	Great Britain	5	4	1	0	0	22	13	+9	14	Promoted to the 2016 Division I B
2	Lithuania	5	2	1	1	1	24	19	+5	9	
3	South Korea	5	2	1	1	1	18	18	0	9	
4	Netherlands	5	1	1	0	3	18	16	+2	5	
5	Estonia (H)	5	1	0	1	3	12	22	−10	4	
6	Romania	5	1	0	1	3	18	24	−6	4	Relegated to the 2016 Division II B

Source: IIHF
(H) Host

=== Match results ===
All times are local (Eastern European Time – UTC+2).

7 December 2014; 13:00	Netherlands	2–4 (0–0, 0–1, 2–3)	Great Britain	Tondiraba Icehall, Tallinn; Attendance: 97

Game reference

Jefrey Vermeulen
Goalies
Adam Goss
Referee:
(Belarus) Vladimir Nalivaiko
Linesmen:
(Croatia) Tomislav Grozaj
(Sweden) Emil Yletyinen

	0–1	20:27 – I. Antonov (A. Forbes, C. Moore) (SH)
	0–2	43:43 – O. Betteridge (M. Stratford)
G. Vogelaar (R. van der Schuit, K. van Gorp) – 47:14	1–2
G. van Nes (M. Hermens) – 49:15	2–2
	2–3	52:21 – J. Cownie
	2–4	54:01 – B. Chamberlain (J. Cownie, L. Hook)

6 min
Penalties
12 min
42
Shots
35

7 December 2014; 16:30	Lithuania	6–5 GWS (1–1, 2–2, 2–2) (OT: 0–0) (SO: 3–2)	Romania	Tondiraba Icehall, Tallinn; Attendance: 312

Game reference

Simas Baltrunas
Goalies
Attila Adorjan
Referee:
(Austria) Manuel Nikolic
Linesmen:
(Hungary) Attila Nagy
(Denmark) Jacques Riisom-Birker

D. Nomanovas (D. Cypas, I. Cetvertak) – 04:07	1–0
	1–1	08:53 – A. Sillo (R. Egyed, H. Gecse) (SH)
	1–2	21:41 – M. Constatin (G. Spiridon)
	1–3	24:36 – A. Sillo (I. Gereb, R. Egyed) (PP)
I. Cetvertak (E. Protcenko, D. Nomanovas) (PP) – 30:51	2–3
D. Cypas – 37:18	3–3
	3–4	44:29 – T. Albert (H. Gecse, H. Csergo) (EA)
D. Nomanovas (PS) – 47:41	4–4
	4–5	58:31 – H. Gecse (S. Hildebrand, H. Csergo) (PP2)
U. Cizas (D. Nomanovas, P. Gintautas) (PP)(EA) – 59:38	5–5

U. Cizas
D. Nomanovs
P. Gintautas
Shootout
H. Csergo
M. Constantin
(miss) Z. Molnar
22 min
Penalties
16 min
56
Shots
28

7 December 2014; 20:00	South Korea	4–3 GWS (2–0, 1–1, 0–2) (OT: 0–0) (SO: 3–2)	Estonia	Tondiraba Icehall, Tallinn; Attendance: 543

Game reference

Kim Kweonyoung
Goalies
Daniil Seppenen
Referee:
(Belgium) Tim Tzirtziganis
Linesmen:
(Serbia) Ivan Nedeljkovic
(Slovakia) Roman Vyleta

Hwang D.H. (Lee S.H.) – 03:52	1–0
Seo Y. (Lee C., Kim D.) (PP) – 11:14	2–0
	2–1	20:20 – D. Fursa (SH)
Kim S. (Lee S.H.) (PP) – 34:00	3–1
	3–2	50:20 – N. Smirnov
	3–3	52:37 – V. Vasjonkin (N. Kozorev, A. Kato) (PP)

Lee C.
Hwang D.H.
Seo K.J.
Shootout
N. Kozorev
D. Fursa
(miss) V. Vasjonkin
31 min
Penalties
16 min
51
Shots
22

8 December 2014; 13:00	Great Britain	5–4 (0–2, 1–0, 4–2)	Lithuania	Tondiraba Icehall, Tallinn; Attendance: 133

Game reference

Adam Goss
Goalies
Simas Baltrunas
Referee:
(Latvia) Gints Zviedritis
Linesmen:
(Croatia) Tomislav Grozaj
(Kazakhstan) Mihail Stupak

	0–1	05:48 – E. Truksnys (D. Kuzminov)
	0–2	10:40 – A. Laukaitis (P. Gintautas, J. Jasinevicius)
C. Wynn (SH2) – 24:41	1–2
I. Antonov – 50:13	2–2
S. Duggan (S. Robson) – 50:31	3–2
	3–3	52:52 – I. Cetvertak (D. Cypas)
J. Cownie (L. Hook, T. Rutkis) – 53:33	4–3
B. Chamberlain (ENG) – 59:19	5–3
	5–4	59:40 – P. Gintautas (E. Krakauskas)

12 min
Penalties
8 min
40
Shots
25

8 December 2014; 16:30	Netherlands	2–3 (2–0, 0–1, 0–2)	South Korea	Tondiraba Icehall, Tallinn; Attendance: 323

Game reference

Mitchel Hamers
Goalies
Lee Yeonseung
Referee:
(Austria) Manuel Nikolic
Linesmen:
(Serbia) Ivan Nedeljkovic
(Slovakia) Roman Vyleta

K. van Gorp (B. Bison, G. van Nes) – 01:31	1–0
J. Smit (G. Vogelaar, D. Stempher) – 17:20	2–0
	2–1	31:32 – Lee C. (Seo Y., Kim D.) (PP)
	2–2	48:37 – Seo Y. (Lee C., Chang Y.W.)
	2–3	57:35 – Bae B.J. (Song H., Heo J.Y.) (PP)

12 min
Penalties
6 min
37
Shots
30

8 December 2014; 20:00	Estonia	4–2 (0–0, 1–1, 3–1)	Romania	Tondiraba Icehall, Tallinn; Attendance: 1215

Game reference

Anatoli Sizov
Goalies
Attila Adorjan
Referee:
(Belarus) Vladimir Nalivaiko
Linesmen:
(Hungary) Attila Nagy
(Denmark) Jacques Riisom-Birker

D. Antonov – 35:21	1–0
	1–1	38:33 – H. Csergo (S. Hildebrand, N. Rokaly)
R. Arrak (J. Petrov, M. Anohhin) – 50:44	2–1
J. Petrov (D. Antonov) – 57:15	3–1
	3–2	58:07 – R. Egyed (M. Oniciuc, Z. Matyas)
G. Samvel (SH, ENG) – 59:56	4–2

33 min
Penalties
12 min
54
Shots
30

10 December 2014; 13:00	Lithuania	5–1 (0–0, 4–1, 1–0)	South Korea	Tondiraba Icehall, Tallinn; Attendance: 224

Game reference

Simas Baltrunas
Goalies
Lee Yeonseung
Referee:
(Belarus) Vladimir Nalivaiko
Linesmen:
(Serbia) Ivan Nedeljkovic
(Sweden) Emil Yletyinen

D. Cypas (D. Nomanovas) (PP) – 27:51	1–0
	1–1	29:45 – Mun J.W. (Kim D.)
D. Nomanovas (PS) – 32:40	2–1
S. Gorelis (I. Cetvertak, D. Nomanovas) – 39:30	3–1
U. Cizas – 39:52	4–1
D. Nomanovas (E. Protcenko) (ENG) – 59:34	5–1

10 min
Penalties
4 min
35
Shots
37

10 December 2014; 16:30	Great Britain	5–2 (2–1, 1–1, 2–0)	Romania	Tondiraba Icehall, Tallinn; Attendance: 275

Game reference

Adam Goss
Goalies
Attila Adorjan
Referee:
(Belgium) Tim Tzirtziganis
Linesmen:
(Hungary) Attila Nagy
(Slovakia) Roman Vyleta

S. Duggan (L. Hook) (PP) – 14:40	1–0
O. Betteridge (C. Wynn, T. Floyd) – 18:22	2–0
	2–1	18:49 – I. Gereb (M. Constantin)
L. Hook (B. Chamberlain, J. Grieveson) – 27:44	3–1
	3–2	31:38 – M. Constantin (S. Hildebrand, M. Oniciuc) (PP)
J. Cownie (B. Chamberlain, L. Hook) – 47:59	4–2
J. Cownie (B. Chamberlain) – 58:48	5–2

8 min
Penalties
6 min
38
Shots
29

10 December 2014; 20:00	Netherlands	7–0 (2–0, 2–0, 3–0)	Estonia	Tondiraba Icehall, Tallinn; Attendance: 1230

Game reference

Mitchel Hamers
Goalies
Daniil Seppenen
Anatoli Sizov
Referee:
(Latvia) Gints Zviedritis
Linesmen:
(Croatia) Tomislav Grozaj
(Kazakhstan) Mihail Stupak

R. de Hondt (R. van der Schuit, B. van Gestel) (PP) – 04:35	1–0
R. van der Schuit (C. Staps, B. van Gestel) – 17:40	2–0
B. Bison (K. van Gorp) – 36:51	3–0
M. Hermans (G. van Nes) – 39:02	4–0
D. Stempher (R. de Hondt) – 41:51	5–0
J. Smit (D. Stempher) – 51:27	6–0
R. de Hondt (R. van der Schuit, B. van Gestel) (PP2) – 58:39	7–0

24 min
Penalties
38 min
32
Shots
16

12 December 2014; 13:00	Romania	6–3 (2–1, 1–2, 3–0)	Netherlands	Tondiraba Icehall, Tallinn; Attendance: 123

Game reference

Attila Adorjan
Goalies
Mitchel Hamers
Referee:
(Belgium) Tim Tzirtziganis
Linesmen:
(Denmark) Jacques Riisom-Birker
(Slovakia) Roman Vyleta

M. Sotir (Z. Matyas) – 02:19	1–0
M. Sotir (M. Constantin) – 06:41	2–0
	2–1	17:39 – C. Staps (R. van der Schuit, G. Vogelaar)
	2–2	33:16 – R. de Hondt (R. van der Schuit, D. Stempher) (PP)
	2–3	37:53 – B. Bison (G. van NES)
M. Constantin (M. Oniciuc, R. Egyed) (PP) – 39:42	3–3
A. Sillo (S. Hildebrand) – 46:29	4–3
F. Creanga (M. Sotir, M. Oniciuc) – 50:08	5–3
M. Constantin (F. Creanga) (ENG) – 59:13	6–3

6 min
Penalties
12 min
35
Shots
48

12 December 2014; 16:30	South Korea	4–5 GWS (1–0, 1–3, 2–1) (OT: 0–0) (SO: 1–2)	Great Britain	Tondiraba Icehall, Tallinn; Attendance: 310

Game reference

Kim Kweonyoung
Lee Yeonseung
Goalies
Adam Goss
Referee:
(Latvia) Gints Zviedritis
Linesmen:
(Kazakhstan) Mihail Stupak
(Sweden) Emil Yletyinen

Hwang D.H. (Kim M.) – 03:02	1–0
	1–1	20:42 – B. Chamberlain (L. Hook, C. Moore)
Kim D. (Lee C.) – 24:39	2–1
	2–2	27:41 – L. Hook (B. Chamberlain, J. Cownie)
	2–3	35:18 – B. Chamberlain (L. Hook, J. Cownie)
Hwang D.H. (Kim D., Seo K.J.) (PP2) – 41:35	3–3
	3–4	51:49 – B. Chamberlain (J. Cownie, L. Hook) (PP)
Kim S. – 53:12	4–4

Lee C. (miss)
Hwang D.H.
Seo K.J. (miss)
Hwang D.H. (miss)
Shootout
J. Cownie
(miss) T. Rutkis
(miss) S. Duggan
J. Cownie
6 min
Penalties
18 min
26
Shots
39

12 December 2014; 20:00	Estonia	4–6 (2–3, 1–2, 1–1)	Lithuania	Tondiraba Icehall, Tallinn; Attendance: 1375

Game reference

Anatoli Sizov
Daniil Seppenen
Goalies
Simas Baltrunas
Referee:
(Austria) Manuel Nikolic
Linesmen:
(Hungary) Attila Nagy
(Serbia) Ivan Nedeljkovic

	0–1	01:14 – S. Gorelis (U. Cizas, A. Laukitis) (PP)
	0–2	08:13 – P. Gintautas (U. Cizas) (SH)
	0–3	11:34 – P. Gintautas (S. Gorelis, U. Cizas) (PP)
V. Vasjonkin (D. Fursa – 13:00	1–3
N. Smirnov (D. Fursa, V. Vasjonkin) (PP) – 15:40	2–3
M. Puzakov (N. Kozorev, Robert Arrak) – 22:46	3–3
	3–4	33:50 – V. Krakauskas
	3–5	39:41 – I. Cetvertak (D. Nomanovas, E. Boroska)
D. Fursa (J. Petrov, N. Smirnov) – 45:35	4–5
	4–6	59:20 – A. Laukaitis (P. Gintautas, J. Jasinevicius) (ENG)

38 min
Penalties
12 min
40
Shots
36

13 December 2014; 13:00	Romania	3–6 (1–2, 2–0, 0–4)	South Korea	Tondiraba Icehall, Tallinn; Attendance: 94

Game reference

Attila Adorjan
Goalies
Lee Yeonseung
Referee:
(Belarus) Vladimir Nalivaiko
Linesmen:
(Croatia) Tomislav Grozaj
(Slovakia) Roman Vyleta

M. Sotir (M. Constantin) – 07:05	1–0
	1–1	14:00 – Kim S. (Lee S.H., Bae B.J.)
	1–2	19:45 – Lee S.H. (Kim S., Bae B.J.)
N. Rokaly – 26:30	2–2
S. Hildebrand (A. Sillo, R. Egyed) – 31:47	3–2
	3–3	47:02 – Lee S.H. (Kim S.) (SH)
	3–4	58:13 – Jung J. (Hwang D.H.) (PP)
	3–5	58:46 – Lee C. (Chang Y.W., Kim D.) (PP)
	3–6	59:50 – Son T. (ENG)

41 min
Penalties
25 min
34
Shots
37

13 December 2014; 16:30	Lithuania	3–4 OT (1–1, 0–2, 2–0) (OT: 0–1)	Netherlands	Tondiraba Icehall, Tallinn; Attendance: 273

Game reference

Simas Baltrunas
Goalies
Jefrey Vermeulen
Referee:
(Austria) Manuel Nikolic
Linesmen:
(Denmark) Jacques Birker-Riisom
(Kazakhstan) Mihail Stupak

P. Gintautas (U. Cizas, S. Gorelis) – 08:24	1–0
	1–1	15:39 – D. Stempher (R. van der Schuit, B. van Gestel)
	1–2	27:56 – R. de Hondt (PS)
	1–3	39:25 – G. van Nes (SH)
P. Gintautas (A. Laukaitis, U. Cizas) – 50:50	2–3
R. Bazys (E. Krakauskas, D. Bisturys) – 54:22	3–3
	3–4	63:55 – K. van Gorp (R. van der Schuit, J. Verkiel) (PP)

10 min
Penalties
41 min
40
Shots
40

13 December 2014; 20:00	Great Britain	3–1 (1–0, 1–0, 1–1)	Estonia	Tondiraba Icehall, Tallinn; Attendance: 550

Game reference

Jordan Hedley
Goalies
Daniil Seppenen
Referee:
(Belgium) Tim Tzirtziganis
Linesmen:
(Serbia) Ivan Nedeljkovic
(Sweden) Emil Yletyinen

L. Hook (B. Chamberlain) – 15:45	1–0
L. Hook (B. Chamberlain, J. Cownie) (PP) – 36:20	2–0
	2–1	44:15 – V. Vasjonkin (N. Smirnov)
B. Chamberlain (I. Antonov, J. Cownie) (ENG)	3–1

4 min
Penalties
14 min
36
Shots
20

=== Statistics ===
==== Top 10 scorers ====
Pos	Player	Country	GP	G	A	Pts	+/-	PIM
1	Bobby Chamberlain	Great Britain	5	6	6	12	+6	10
2	Jordan Cownie	Great Britain	5	5	6	11	+12	0
3	Lewis Hook	Great Britain	5	4	7	11	+10	4
4	Paulius Gintautas	Lithuania	5	6	3	9	+5	2
5	Danielius Nomanovas	Lithuania	5	4	5	9	0	6
6	Raymond van der Schuit	Netherlands	5	1	7	8	0	6
7	Mircea Constantin	Romania	5	4	3	7	-1	0
8	Ugnius Cizas	Lithuania	5	2	5	7	+5	2
9	Kim Donhyung	South Korea	5	1	5	6	–4	2
10	Reno de Hondt	Netherlands	5	4	1	5	–4	2

==== Goaltending leaders ====
(minimum 40% team's total ice time)

Pos	Player	Country	MINS	GA	Sv%	GAA	SO
1	Daniil Seppenen	Estonia	209:11	12	91.24	3.44	0
2	Lee Yeonseung	South Korea	205:26	11	90.83	3.21	0
3	Jefred Vermeulen	Netherlands	123:55	7	90.67	3.39	0
4	Attila Adorjan	Romania	302:37	22	90.48	4.36	0
5	Simas Baltrunas	Lithuania	308:18	18	90.22	3.50	0

=== Awards ===
==== Best Players Selected by the Directorate ====
- Goaltender: (Romania) Attila Adorjan
- Defenceman: (Lithuania) Domanatas Cypas
- Forward: (United Kingdom) Jordan Cownie

== Division II B ==
The Division II B tournament was played in Jaca, Spain, from 13 to 19 December 2014.

=== Participating teams ===
Team	Qualification
Croatia	placed 6th in Division II A last year and were relegated
Spain	hosts; placed 2nd in Division II B last year
Serbia	placed 3rd in Division II B last year
Australia	placed 4th in Division II B last year
Iceland	placed 5th in Division II B last year
Belgium	placed 1st in Division III last year and were promoted

=== Final standings ===
Pos	Team	Pld	W	OTW	OTL	L	GF	GA	GD	Pts	Promotion or relegation
1	Croatia	5	5	0	0	0	22	9	+13	15	Promoted to the 2016 Division II A
2	Spain (H)	5	4	0	0	1	27	10	+17	12	
3	Australia	5	2	0	1	2	15	15	0	7	
4	Belgium	5	1	1	1	2	15	17	−2	6	
5	Serbia	5	1	1	0	3	9	19	−10	5	
6	Iceland	5	0	0	0	5	11	29	−18	0	Relegated to the 2016 Division III

Source: IIHF
(H) Host

=== Match results ===
All times are local (Central European Time – UTC+1).

13 December 2014; 13:00	Belgium	3–2 OT (0–1, 1–0, 1–1) (OT: 1–0)	Australia	Pabellon de Hielo, Jaca; Attendance: 203

Game reference

Keanu Evers
Goalies
Charlie Smart
Referee:
(Hungary) Miklos Haszonits
Linesmen:
(Spain) Sergio Biec
(Netherlands) Jos Korte

	0–1	11:43 – C. Kubara (D. Pataky)
P. van Noten (F. Neven, B. Henry) – 33:48	1–1
	1–2	53:56 – T. Sak (S. Hodic)
B. van Rooy (B. Henry, F. Neven) (EA) – 59:23	2–2
B. van Rooy (E. Goris, F. Neven) – 60:29	3–2

6 min
Penalties
12 min
42
Shots
24

13 December 2014; 16:30	Serbia	0–4 (0–1, 0–0, 0–3)	Croatia	Pabellon de Hielo, Jaca; Attendance: 310

Game reference

Jug Mitic
Goalies
Vilim Rosandic
Referee:
(France) Damien Bliek
Linesmen:
(Bulgaria) Mikulash Furnadziev
(Spain) Alejandro Garcia

0–1	00:32 – L. Jarcov (M. Milicic, R. Platuzic)
0–2	47:46 – L. Jarcov (M. Milicic)
0–3	48:22 – L. Vukoja
0–4	59:49 – I. Jankovic (B. Kegalj, L. Vukoja)

6 min
Penalties
6 min
27
Shots
39

13 December 2014; 20:30	Spain	8–3 (1–0, 3–2, 4–1)	Iceland	Pabellon de Hielo, Jaca; Attendance: 950

Game reference

Ignacio Garcia
Goalies
Atli Valdimarsson
Referee:
(Sweden) Stian Halm
Linesmen:
(China) Liu Jia Qi
(France) Mathieu Loos

P. Pantoja (L. Hernandez) – 04:11	1–0
A. Fernandez-Pola – 26:29	2–0
	2–1	28:02 – I. Arnason (A. Helgason, D.S. Magnusson (PP)
	2–2	28:44 – G. Thorsteinsson (B. Lindal)
M. Manero (P. Fuentes, I. Gainza) (PP2) – 30:30	3–2
A. Fernandez-Pola (A. Arrinda, M. Manero) – 34:42	4–2
G. Gonzalez (A. Garcia) (SH) – 44:29	5–2
M. Manero (I. Solorzano, I. Gainza) (PP) – 48:03	6–2
	6–3	52:12 – B. Johannesson (H. Sigrunarson, I. Arnason) (PP)
D. Alvarez (O. Rubio) – 59:13	7–3
O. Rubio (P. Cerda) – 59:20	8–3

10 min
Penalties
24 min
47
Shots
14

14 December 2014; 13:00	Croatia	4–2 (0–0, 3–1, 1–1)	Australia	Pabellon de Hielo, Jaca; Attendance: 127

Game reference

Vilim Rosandic
Goalies
Nicholas Novysedlak
Referee:
(Sweden) Stian Halm
Linesmen:
(Spain) Alejandro Garcia
(China) Liu Jia Qi

M. Milicic (R. Platuzic, T. Boric) (PP) – 21:50	1–0
L. Vukoja (I. Jankovic, B. Kegalj) – 22:43	2–0
B. Kegalj (L. Jarcov, M. Milicic) – 33:55	3–0
	3–1	36:14 – Z. Boyle (J. Williams) (SH)
L. Novak (M. Pavicevic) – 43:19	4–1
	4–2	44:38 – Y. Reinecke (D. Pataky, K. Fedor) (PP)

26 min
Penalties
16 min
39
Shots
21

14 December 2014; 16:30	Iceland	2–6 (0–1, 2–1, 0–4)	Belgium	Pabellon de Hielo, Jaca; Attendance: 250

Game reference

Atli Valdimarsson
Goalies
Keanu Evers
Referee:
(Italy) Andrea Moschen
Linesmen:
(Spain) Sergio Biec
(France) Mathieu Loos

	0–1	02:01 – F. Neven (E. Goris, B. Henry) (PP)
E. Olafsson (G. Thorsteinsson) – 23:24	1–1
	1–2	33:35 – B. Henry (P. van Noten)
M. Maack (D.S. Magnusson, I. Arnason) – 35:00	2–2
	2–3	41:18 – Q. Bollue (B. van Rooy, E. Goris) (PP)
	2–4	52:40 – B. van Rooy (E. Goris, B. Henry) (PP)
	2–5	53:33 – A. Kolodziejczyk (Q. Bollue)
	2–6	56:49 – B. Henry (P. van Noten, L. Tambeur)

30 min
Penalties
14 min
26
Shots
29

14 December 2014; 20:00	Spain	7–0 (3–0, 1–0, 3–0)	Serbia	Pabellon de Hielo, Jaca; Attendance: 950

Game reference

Ignacio Garcia
Goalies
Jug Mitic
Referee:
(Hungary) Miklos Haszonits
Linesmen:
(Netherlands) Jos Korte
(Romania) Istvan Mathe

L.J. Hernandez (G. Gonzalez, M. Paul) – 08:33	1–0
M. Manero (P. Fuentes, I. Gainza) (PP2) – 14:04	2–0
I. Solorzano (P. Fuentes) – 18:04	3–0
I. Solorzano (M. Manero, I. Gainza) (PP) – 38:25	4–0
I. Solorzano (P. Fuentes, I. Gainza) – 40:34	5–0
G. Gonzalez (P. Pantoja, L.J. Hernandez) – 43:53	6–0
L. Poch (P. Fuentes, I. Solorzano) (PP) – 46:43	7–0

26 min
Penalties
34 min
43
Shots
27

16 December 2014; 13:00	Croatia	6–3 (2–0, 2–3, 2–0)	Iceland	Pabellon de Hielo, Jaca; Attendance: 61

Game reference

Ivan Ruzic
Goalies
Nicolas Jouanne
Referee:
(France) Damien Bliek
Linesmen:
(Bulgaria) Mikulash Firmadziev
(Romania) Istvan Mathe

M. Milicic (L. Jarcov, R. Platuzic) – 14:24	1–0
L. Vukoja (I. Jankovic) (PP) – 17:02	2–0
	2–1	31:26 – M. Maack (B. Johannesson)
	2–2	32:12 – E. Olafsson (I. Arnason, B. Johannesson)
I. Jancovic (L. Jarcov) – 33:18	3–2
J. Jazbec (L. Vukoja) – 35:38	4–2
	4–3	39:08 – A. Helgason (I. Arnason) (PP)
L. Jarcov (I. Jankovic) – 44:38	5–3
M. Milicic (T. Stancic, R. Platuzic) – 48:40	6–3

10 min
Penalties
29 min
35
Shots
22

16 December 2014; 16:30	Serbia	2–4 (0–1, 1–2, 1–1)	Australia	Pabellon de Hielo, Jaca; Attendance: 300

Game reference

Jug Mitic
Goalies
Charlie Smart
Referee:
(Hungary) Miklos Haszonits
Linesmen:
(Spain) Sergio Biec
(China) Liu Jia Qi

	0–1	01:42 – K. Fedor (C. Kubara) (PP)
	0–2	24:34 – C. Kubara (R. McGuiness, Z. Boyle)
L. Lestaric (I. Glavonjic) (PP) – 29:58	1–2
	1–3	34:51 – R. McGuiness (C. Kubara)
	1–4	53:56 – S. Hodic (A. Punlair, K. Webster)
S. Pajic (I. Anic, A. Zwick) (PP, EA) – 58:16	2–4

10 min
Penalties
18 min
67
Shots
17

16 December 2014; 20:00	Spain	5–2 (0–1, 2–0, 3–1)	Belgium	Pabellon de Hielo, Jaca; Attendance: 950

Game reference

Ignacio Garcia
Goalies
Keanu Evers
Referee:
(Italy) Andrea Moschen
Linesmen:
(Netherlands) Jos Korte
(France) Mathieu Loos

	0–1	15:52 – B. van Rooy (E. Goris) (SH)
L.J. Hernandez (A. Arrinda, P. Fuentes) (PP) – 35:35	1–1
A. Fernandez-Pola (M. Garcia) (SH) – 39:59	2–1
A. Arrinda (M. Manero) – 42:13	3–1
L.J. Hernandez (I. Gainza, A. Arrinda) (PP) – 47:16	4–1
P. Cerda (D. Alvarez, O. Rubio) – 53:47	5–1
	5–2	57:52 – B. Henry (E. Goris) (PP)

35 min
Penalties
30 min
40
Shots
23

18 December 2014; 13:00	Iceland	2–4 (0–1, 1–3, 1–0)	Serbia	Pabellon de Hielo, Jaca; Attendance: 86

Game reference

Nicolas Jouanne
Goalies
Jug Mitic
Referee:
(Italy) Andrea Moschen
Linesmen:
(Spain) Alejandro Garcia
(France) Mathieu Loos

	0–1	06:54 – N. Stojanovic (I. Glavonjic, U. Novakovic)
	0–2	21:18 – I. Glavonjic (P. Podunava)
	0–3	24:18 – N. Barackov (A. Zwick, S. Pajic)
D.S. Magnusson (I. Arnason) – 27:53	1–3
	1–4	33:35 – U. Novakovic (I. Glavonjic, L. Lestaric)
B. Johannesson (I. Arnason, A. Helgason) (EA) – 59:34	2–4

2 min
Penalties
10 min
25
Shots
36

18 December 2014; 16:30	Belgium	2–5 (1–1, 0–1, 1–3)	Croatia	Pabellon de Hielo, Jaca; Attendance: 300

Game reference

Keanu Evers
Goalies
Vilim Rosandic
Referee:
(Sweden) Stian Halm
Linesmen:
(Spain) Sergio Biec
(Bulgaria) Mikulash Furnadziev

S. Coolen (A. Kolodziejczyk, J. Buelens) – 04:56	1–0
	1–1	11:38 – L. Jarcov (SH)
	1–2	34:20 – K. Krnic (R. Platuzic, T. Boric)
	1–3	40:26 – L. Vukoja (I. Jankovic, B. Kegalj)
P. van Noten (K. Glassee) – 42:35	2–3
	2–4	53:43 – L. Jarcov (T. Boric) (PP)
	2–5	58:23 – I. Jankovic (L. Vukoja, T. Boric)

16 min
Penalties
22 min
20
Shots
44

18 December 2014; 20:00	Australia	2–5 (1–1, 1–2, 0–2)	Spain	Pabellon de Hielo, Jaca; Attendance: 850

Game reference

Nicholas Novysedlak
Goalies
Jhon Sebastian Varela
Referee:
(France) Damien Bliek
Linesmen:
(Netherlands) Jos Korte
(Romania) Istvan Mathe

	0–1	06:22 – I. Gainza (P. Pantoja, G. Gonzalez)
C. Kubara (K. Fedor, R. McGuiness) – 14:25	1–1
	1–2	23:07 – O. Rubio (P. Fuentes)
	1–3	24:17 – L.J. Hernandez (G. Gonzalez, (B. Baldris)
K. Fedor (S. Hodic) – 35:29	2–3
	2–4	47:18 – O. Rubio (D. Alvarez, B. Baldris)
	2–5	58:54 – O. Rubio (D. Alvarez) (SH)

14 min
Penalties
12 min
16
Shots
51

19 December 2014; 13:00	Serbia	3–2 OT (0–0, 2–0, 0–2) (OT: 1–0)	Belgium	Pabellon de Hielo, Jaca; Attendance: 63

Game reference

Jug Mitic
Goalies
Keanu Evers
Referee:
(Hungary) Miklos Haszonits
Linesmen:
(Spain) Alejandro Garcia
(Romania) Istvan Mathe

I. Glavonjic (N. Stojanovic, L. Lestaric) (PP) – 21:04	1–0
P. Podunavac (P. Novakovic, S. Pajic) (PP) – 39:51	2–0
	2–1	42:50 – B. Henry (Y. Dockx, F. Neven) (SH)
	2–2	49:21 – K. Glassee (A. Kolodziejczyk, V. Delbrassine)
A. Zwick (S. Pajic) – 62:31	3–2

10 min
Penalties
18 min
31
Shots
31

19 December 2014; 16:30	Australia	5–1 (1–0, 2–0, 2–1)	Iceland	Pabellon de Hielo, Jaca; Attendance: 250

Game reference

Charlie Smart
Goalies
Nicholas Jouanne
Referee:
(Italy) Andrea Moschen
Linesmen:
(Bulgaria) Mikulash Furnadziev
(China) Liu Jia Qi

K. Fedor (S. Hodic) – 03:29	1–0
S. Hodic (K. Fedor) (PP) – 21:00	2–0
S. Hodic – 42:31	3–0
	3–1	42:31 – A. Helgason (H. Sigrunarson, I. Arnason) (PP)
K. Fedor (C. Kubara, S. Hodic) (PP) – 55:39	4–1
Y. Reinecke (Z. Boyle, A. Punler) (PP2) – 59:59	5–1

12 min
Penalties
20 min
21
Shots
50

19 December 2014; 20:00	Croatia	3–2 (1–0, 2–0, 0–2)	Spain	Pabellon de Hielo, Jaca; Attendance: 1650

Game reference

Vilim Rosandic
Goalies
Ignacio Garcia
Referee:
(France) Damien Bliek
Linesmen:
(Netherlands) Jos Korte
(France) Mathieu Loos

I. Jankovic (L. Vukoja) – 04:59	1–0
M. Milicic (M. Plesko, Luka Jarcov) (PP) – 23:04	2–0
I. Jankovic – 30:58	3–0
	3–1	52:43 – O. Rubio (A. Garcia)
	3–2	54:26 – I. Vicente (I. Solorzano)

6 min
Penalties
26 min
43
Shots
30

=== Statistics ===
==== Top 10 scorers ====
Pos	Player	Country	GP	G	A	Pts	+/-	PIM
1	Ivan Janković	Croatia	5	5	4	9	+9	4
2	Luka Jarcov	Croatia	5	5	4	9	+5	20
3	Bryan Henry	Belgium	5	4	4	8	+1	4
3	Luka Vukoja	Croatia	5	4	4	8	+7	2
5	Ingthor Arnason	Iceland	5	1	7	8	-3	4
6	Oriol Rubio	Spain	5	5	2	7	+8	0
7	Kayne Fedor	Australia	5	4	3	7	+2	4
7	Matija Miličić	Croatia	5	4	3	7	+2	0
9	Sam Hodic	Australia	5	3	4	7	0	12
10	Inigo Gainza	Spain	5	1	6	7	+3	6

==== Goaltending leaders ====
(minimum 40% team's total ice time)

Pos	Player	Country	MINS	GA	Sv%	GAA	SO
1	Charlie Smart	Australia	180:29	6	96.23	1.99	0
2	Vilim Rosandic	Croatia	240:00	6	93.88	1.50	1
3	Ignacio Garcia	Spain	239:38	8	92.52	2.00	1
4	Keanu Evers	Belgium	302:47	17	89.70	3.37	0
5	Jug Mitic	Serbia	300:05	19	87.87	3.80	0

=== Awards ===
==== Best Players Selected by the Directorate ====
- Goaltender: (Australia) Charlie Smart
- Defenceman: (Spain) Inigo Gainza
- Forward: (Croatia) Luka Jarcov
