= Johannes Johannesen =

Norwegian ice hockey player (born 1997)

- Born: 1 March 1997 (age 29) Stavanger, Norway
- Height: 5 ft 11 in (180 cm)
- Weight: 187 lb (85 kg; 13 st 5 lb)
- Position: Defence
- Shoots: Right
- Liiga team Former teams: Lahti Pelicans; Stavanger Oilers; Frölunda HC; Düsseldorfer EG; Västerviks IK; Mora IK; Rögle BK
- National team: Norway
- Playing career: 2013–present

Johannes Johannesen (born 1 March 1997) is a Norwegian professional ice hockey player who is a defenceman for Lahti Pelicans of the Liiga.

== Playing career ==
Johannesen hails from Stavanger and made his debut for his hometown team, the Stavanger Oilers, in the Norway's top-tier Get Ligaen in the course of the 2014–15 season. After his first full season with the Oilers, the 2015–16 campaign, he grabbed Get-Liga Rookie of the Year accolades. Johannesen claimed the 2015 and 2016 Norwegian championship with the Oilers.

His outstanding play in the GET-ligaen and the Champions Hockey League drew the interest of European powerhouses. In May 2016, he inked a two-year deal with Frölunda HC of the Swedish Hockey League (SHL).

In the 2018–19 season, with 6 goals and 23 points in 48 games and establishing himself as one of the premier blueliners, Johannesen would sign after the post-season to a two-year contract with Düsseldorfer EG of the DEL, on 16 April 2019.

Following the conclusion of his contract in Germany, Johannesen opted to return to the Swedish Allsvenskan, agreeing to a one-year contract with Västerviks IK on 1 June 2021.

== International play ==
Medal record

Men's ice hockey

Representing Norway

World Championships
Bronze medal – third place	2026 Switzerland	

His international play debut was with Norway in the 2016 IIHF Championship.

== Career statistics ==
=== Regular season and playoffs ===
			Regular season					Playoffs
Season	Team	League	GP	G	A	Pts	PIM	GP	G	A	Pts	PIM
2011–12	Viking Hockey	NOR U17	17	1	3	4	8	—	—	—	—	—
2013–14	Viking Hockey	NOR U18	24	6	10	16	0	3	0	1	1	0
2013–14	Viking Hockey	NOR.2	8	0	0	0	0	—	—	—	—	—
2014–15	Stavanger Oilers	NOR U20	28	1	14	15	10	12	2	8	10	4
2014–15	Stavanger Oilers	NOR	19	0	2	2	0	—	—	—	—	—
2014–15	Stavanger Oilers	NOR U18	—	—	—	—	—	2	1	0	1	2
2015–16	Stavanger Oilers	NOR	43	3	11	14	12	17	1	6	7	4
2016–17	Frölunda HC	J20	10	0	2	2	2	5	0	0	0	2
2016–17	Frölunda HC	SHL	10	1	2	3	2	—	—	—	—	—
2016–17	IK Oskarshamn	Allsv	26	1	1	2	6	—	—	—	—	—
2017–18	Hanhals IF	SWE.3	4	0	2	2	2	—	—	—	—	—
2017–18	Leksands IF	Allsv	8	0	1	1	4	—	—	—	—	—
2017–18	Stavanger Oilers	NOR	24	3	8	11	4	5	0	0	0	0
2018–19	Stavanger Oilers	NOR	48	6	17	23	16	12	1	5	6	4
2019–20	Düsseldorfer EG	DEL	47	1	8	9	16	—	—	—	—	—
2020–21	Düsseldorfer EG	DEL	20	0	5	5	2	—	—	—	—	—
2021–22	Västerviks IK	Allsv	51	2	22	24	20	7	1	3	4	4
2022–23	Mora IK	Allsv	49	4	18	22	6	10	0	2	2	0
2023–24	Rögle BK	SHL	14	0	0	0	2	—	—	—	—	—
2023–24	Pelicans	Liiga	29	1	4	5	10	17	1	2	3	0
2024–25	Pelicans	Liiga	59	6	13	19	20	—	—	—	—	—
2025–26	Pelicans	Liiga	58	3	3	6	8	8	1	0	1	4
NOR totals			134	12	38	50	32	34	2	11	13	8
SHL totals			10	1	2	3	2	—	—	—	—	—

=== International ===
Year	Team	Event	Result	GP	G	A	Pts	PIM
2015	Norway	WJC18 D1A	16th	5	0	2	2	0
2016	Norway	WJC D1A	17th	5	1	1	2	2
2016	Norway	WC	10th	7	2	1	3	0
2017	Norway	WJC D1A	21st	5	0	0	0	4
2017	Norway	WC	11th	7	0	0	0	0
2018	Norway	OG	11th	5	0	0	0	0
2018	Norway	WC	13th	7	0	0	0	0
2019	Norway	WC	12th	7	1	0	1	0
2021	Norway	OGQ	DNQ	3	0	0	0	2
2022	Norway	WC	13th	7	0	3	3	4
2023	Norway	WC	13th	7	0	1	1	6
2024	Norway	WC	11th	7	0	2	2	6
2024	Norway	OGQ	DNQ	3	1	0	1	0
2025	Norway	WC	12th	3	1	1	2	2
2026	Norway	WC	3rd place, bronze medalist(s)	10	1	4	5	0
Junior totals				15	1	3	4	6
Senior totals				67	5	12	17	18

== Awards and honors ==
Award	Year
GET
Rookie of the Year	2016
CHL
Champions (Frölunda HC)	2017
