= Dominic Zwerger =

Austrian ice hockey player (born 1996)

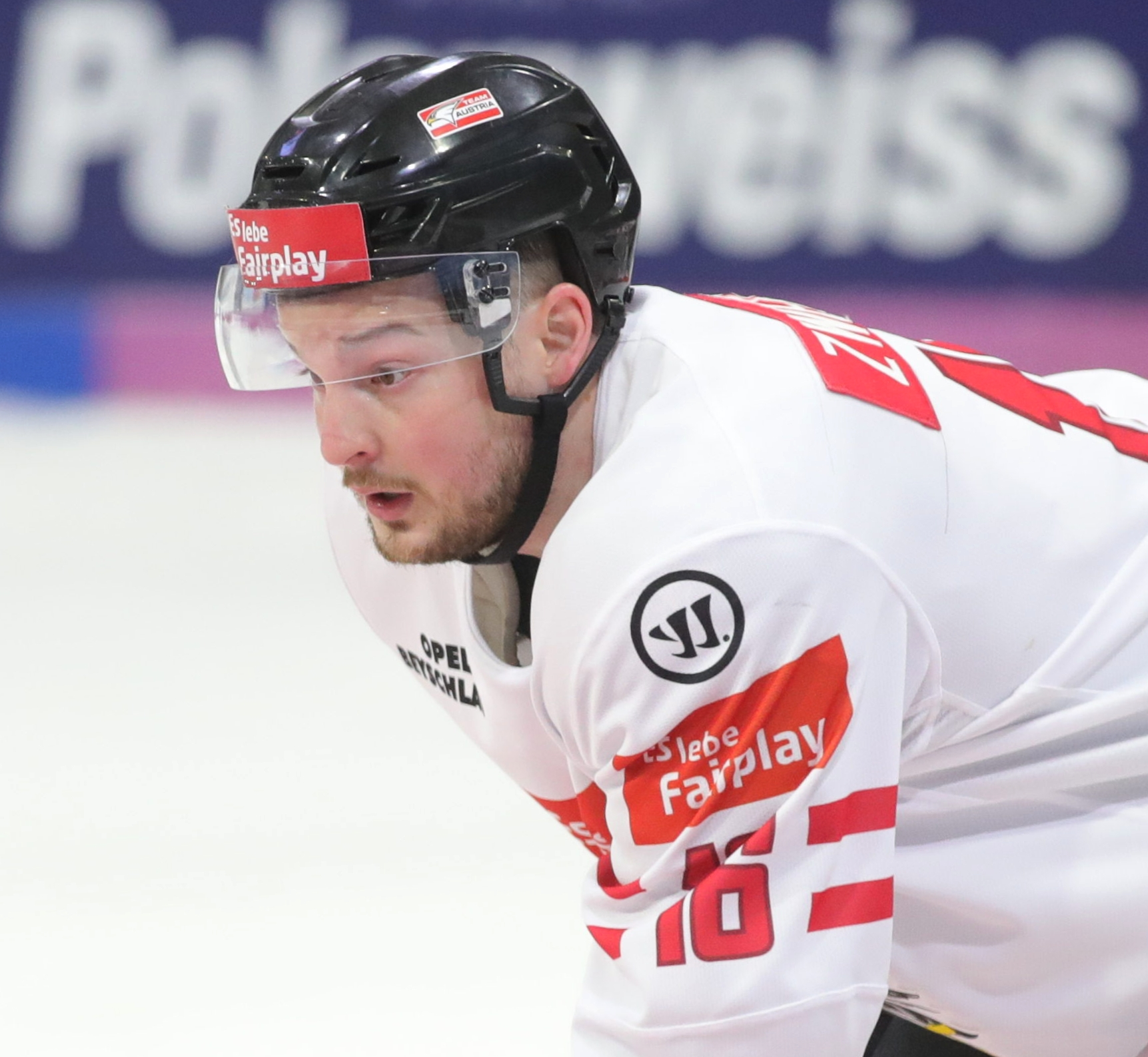
- Zwerger with Austria at the 2023 IIHF World Championship
- Born: 16 July 1996 (age 30) Dornbirn, Austria
- Height: 6 ft 0 in (183 cm)
- Weight: 205 lb (93 kg; 14 st 9 lb)
- Position: Left wing
- Shoots: Left
- NL team Former teams: EHC Biel-Bienne; HC Ambrì-Piotta
- National team: Austria
- NHL draft: Undrafted
- Playing career: 2017–present

Dominic Zwerger (born 16 July 1996) is an Austrian professional ice hockey player who is a left winger for EHC Biel-Bienne of the National League (NL).

== Playing career ==
Zwerger played as a youth in Austria and Switzerland, before leaving the junior club of HC Davos after he was selected by the Spokane Chiefs of the Western Hockey League in the second round (106th overall) of the 2013 CHL Import Draft.

Undrafted after four seasons in the WHL with the Chiefs and Everett Silvertips, Zwerger returned to Switzerland, making his professional debut with HC Ambrì-Piotta in the 2017–18 season.

Zwerger played his first nine professional seasons with HC Ambrì-Piotta before leaving the club to sign a four-year contract with EHC Biel-Bienne of the NL on 22 December 2025.

== Career statistics ==
=== Regular season and playoffs ===
			Regular season					Playoffs
Season	Team	League	GP	G	A	Pts	PIM	GP	G	A	Pts	PIM
2012–13	HC Davos	Elite Jr. A	21	6	11	17	6	2	0	0	0	0
2013–14	Spokane Chiefs	WHL	53	16	10	26	20	4	1	0	1	4
2014–15	Spokane Chiefs	WHL	71	17	21	38	26	6	2	0	2	6
2015–16	Spokane Chiefs	WHL	65	27	28	55	46	6	1	3	4	4
2016–17	Everett Silvertips	WHL	67	28	47	75	32	10	4	11	15	6
2017–18	HC Ambrì-Piotta	NL	50	16	24	40	20	—	—	—	—	—
2018–19	HC Ambrì-Piotta	NL	49	17	25	42	30	5	2	3	5	2
2019–20	HC Ambrì-Piotta	NL	46	12	12	24	58	—	—	—	—	—
2020–21	HC Ambrì-Piotta	NL	51	9	28	37	12	—	—	—	—	—
2021–22	HC Ambrì-Piotta	NL	47	9	19	28	57	2	0	1	1	0
2022–23	HC Ambrì-Piotta	NL	52	4	22	26	35	—	—	—	—	—
2023–24	HC Ambrì-Piotta	NL	36	4	18	22	6	3	0	0	0	0
2024–25	HC Ambrì-Piotta	NL	50	3	11	14	39	4	0	0	0	0
2025–26	HC Ambrì-Piotta	NL	49	15	11	26	16	—	—	—	—	—
NL totals			430	89	170	259	273	14	2	4	6	2

=== International ===
Year	Team	Event	Result	GP	G	A	Pts	PIM
2013	Austria	U18-IB	19th	5	3	1	4	4
2013	Austria	WJC-IA	15th	3	0	0	0	2
2014	Austria	U18-IB	18th	5	3	4	7	0
2016	Austria	WJC-IA	12th	5	3	4	7	2
2018	Austria	WC	14th	7	2	0	2	2
2019	Austria	WC	16th	7	0	2	2	2
2021	Austria	OGQ	DNQ	3	0	3	3	0
2023	Austria	WC	14th	7	1	1	2	0
2024	Austria	WC	10th	7	2	6	8	4
2024	Austria	OGQ	DNQ	3	2	1	3	0
2025	Austria	WC	8th	8	4	3	7	10
2026	Austria	WC	11th	5	1	3	4	0
Junior totals				18	9	9	18	8
Senior totals				47	12	19	31	18
