= Edijs Brahmanis =

Latvian ice hockey player (born 1983)

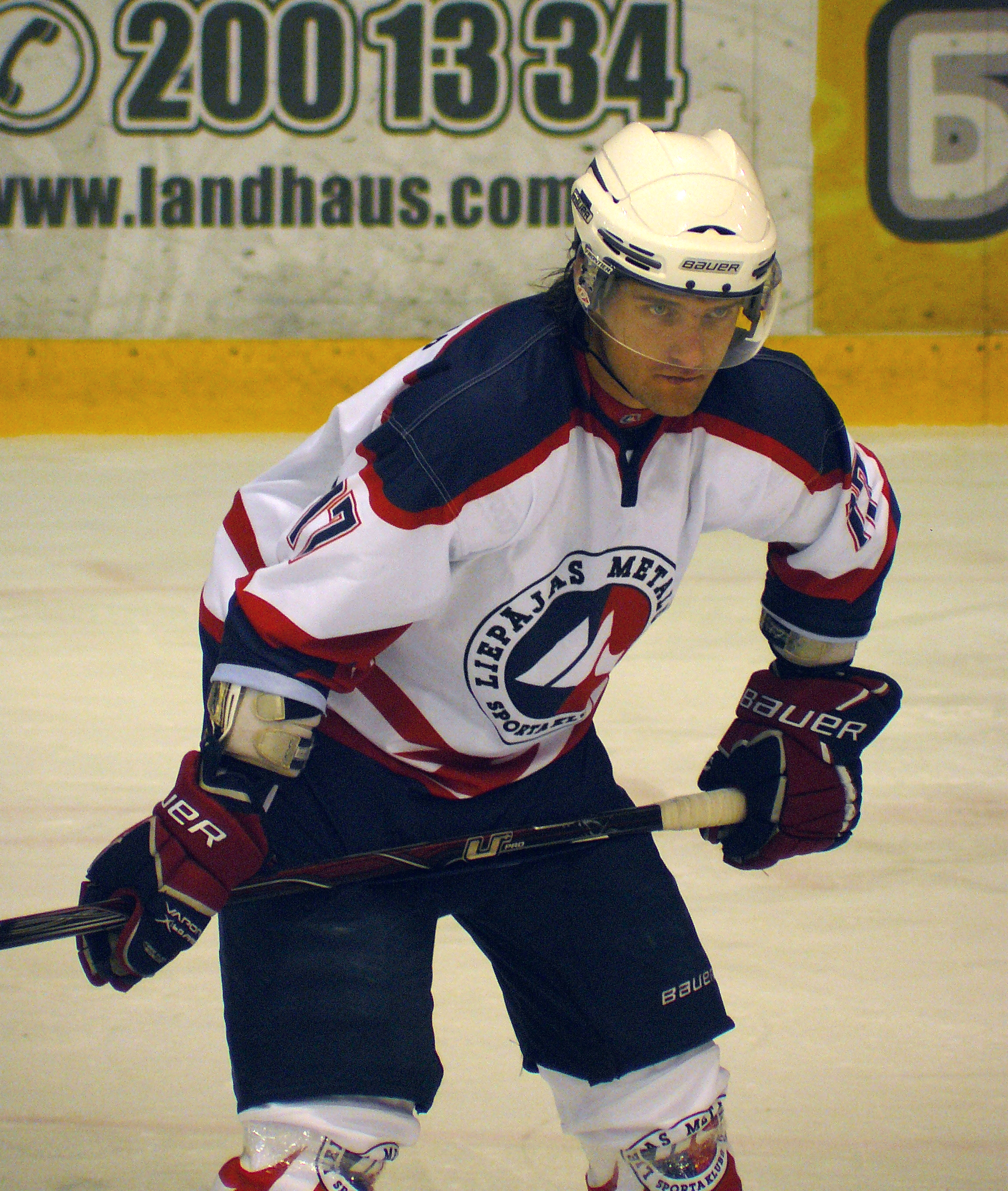
- Born: November 17, 1983 (age 42) Riga, Latvian SSR, Soviet Union
- Height: 6 ft 0 in (183 cm)
- Weight: 194 lb (88 kg; 13 st 12 lb)
- Position: Left winger
- Shot: Right
- OHL team Former teams: HK Olimp/Venta 2002; HK Rīga 2000; HK Zemgale; ASK/Ogre; Basingstoke Bison; HK Metalurgs Liepaja; Dinamo Riga; Eispiraten Crimmitschau; Saryarka Karagandy; Arystan Temirtau; HK Gomel; HC Shakhter Soligorsk; HK Prizma Riga
- National team: Latvia
- Playing career: 1999–present

Edijs Brahmanis (born November 17, 1983, in Riga, Soviet Union) is a Latvian ice hockey left winger, currently playing for HK Olimp/Venta 2002 of the Latvian Hockey Higher League.

In 2004-05, while playing for ASK/Ogre, he was the top goal scorer of Latvian league. During 2008-09 Brahmanis also played four games for the Kontinental Hockey League club Dinamo Riga.
