= HK Olimp/Venta 2002 =

Defunct ice hockey team from Riga, Latvia

- City: Riga, Latvia
- League: Optibet Hockey League; 2019 - 2022
- Founded: 2018
- Folded: 2022
- Home arena: Inbox Ice Arena
- Colours: Black, gold, white
- General manager: Aleksejs Sirokovs
- Head coach: Aigars Cipruss
- Captain: Georgijs Pujacs
- Website: HK Olimp/Venta 2002

Franchise history
- 2018 - 2020: HK Olimp
- 2020 - present: HK Olimp/Venta 2002

HK Olimp/Venta 2002 were a Latvian ice hockey team that played in the Optibet Hockey League, the top tier of the sport in Latvia. The team was based in Riga and played their home games at the Inbox Ice Arena.

== History ==
HK Olimp was founded in 2018, and the following year joined the Optibet Hockey League where they were immediately considered to be dark horses for the championship, due to have several Latvian national team members as part of their roster, including Georgijs Pujacs and Aleksejs Širokovs, both of whom also had KHL significant experience. The dark horse appellation turned out to be prescient as the team were in 1st place in their inaugural season, before the play-offs were cancelled due to the COVID-19 pandemic. During the off-season, the team partnered with junior side Venta 2002, and as a result rebranded as HK Olimp/Venta 2002.

As a result of 1st-place finish when the season was cancelled, Olimp qualified for the 2020–21 IIHF Continental Cup where they were scheduled to face-off in Group E against Shakhtyor Soligorsk of Belarus, Slovenian team Olimpija Ljubljana and the winner of Group B (made up of Crvena Zvezda Belgrade of Serbia, Mladost Zagreb from Croatia, Bulgarian side Irbis-Skate Sofia and Turkish outfit Buz Beykoz Istanbul). However, two months later, the IIHF cancelled the Continental Cup due to the Covid-19 pandemic.

After the end of the 2021-22 Latvian League season, Olimp/Venta 2002 folded and did not apply for the next season. The core of the team then moved on to HK Dinamo Rīga.

== Roster ==
Updated February 11, 2021.

Goaltenders
Number		Player	Catches	Acquired	Place of Birth
79	(Russia)	Andrej Bonch-Brujevič	L	2019	Saint Petersburg, Russia
30	(Latvia)	Rūdolfs Gusts Lazdiņš	L	2020	Riga, Latvia
35	(Latvia)	Kārlis Zakrevskis	L	2020	Riga, Latvia

Defencemen
Number		Player	Shoots	Acquired	Place of Birth
61	(Latvia)	Krists Apsītis	L	2019	Riga, Latvia
77	(Latvia)	Vladislavs Balakuns	L	2019	Riga, Latvia
65	(Latvia)	Arvils Bergmanis	L	2020	Riga, Latvia
71	(Latvia)	Aleksejs Popovs	L	2021	Riga, Latvia
23	(Latvia)	Aleksandrs Jerofejevs	L	2019	Riga, Latvia
81	(Latvia)	Georgijs Pujacs (C)	L	2019	Riga, Latvia
33	(Latvia)	Maksims Širokovs (A)	R	2019	Riga, Latvia

Forwards
Number		Player	Shoots	Position	Acquired	Place of Birth
59	(Latvia)	Lauris Bajaruns	R	RW	2020	Ventspils, Latvia
93	(Latvia)	Edijs Brahmanis	R	LW	2019	Riga, Latvia
28	(Latvia)	Emīls Ezītis	L	C	2019	Riga, Latvia
47	(Latvia)	Kirils Galoha	R	C/RW	2020	Riga, Latvia
18	(Latvia)	Sandis Grīnbergs	L	W	2020	-
52	(Latvia)	Arjoms Koppass	L	F	2020	Valka, Latvia
17	(Latvia)	Dmitrijs Korņilovs	L	W	2019	Sigulda, Latvia
14	(Latvia)	Ričards Landmanis	L	F	2020	Ventspils, Latvia
15	(Latvia)	Sandis Mežaraups	R	F	2019	Jēkabpils, Latvia
10	(Latvia)	Roberts Potapenko	L	LW/RW	2019	-
19	(Latvia)	Miķelis Rēdlihs	L	RW	2020	Riga, Latvia
72	(Latvia)	Roberts Siliņš	L	F	2020	-
62	(Latvia)	Aleksejs Širokovs (A)	R	C	2019	Riga, Latvia
44	(Latvia)	Gatis Sprukts	L	LW/C	2020	Jelgava, Latvia
84	(Latvia)	Renārs Undelis	L	C	2019	Riga, Latvia
21	(Russia)	Valerii Vorozhontsov	L	F	2020	Yekaterinburg, Russia
68	(Russia)	Fedor Yarionovskii	L	F	2020	Saint Petersburg, Russia
11	(Latvia)	Ņikita Zantmans	R	F	2020	-

== Season-by-season record ==
Note: GP = Games played, W = Wins, L = Losses, T = Ties, OTL = Overtime losses, Pts = Points, GF = Goals for, GA = Goals against, PIM = Penalties in minutes

Season	League	GP	W	L	T	OTW	OTL	Pts	GF	GA	Finish	Playoffs
2019-20	Optibet Hockey League	35	22	5	—	4	4	56	121	67	1st	Playoffs cancelled

== Team records ==
=== Career ===
These are the top five scorers in HK Olimpa history.

Note: Pos = Position; GP = Games played; G = Goals; A = Assists; Pts = Points

Player	Pos	GP	G	A	Pts
Nikolajs Jeļisejevs	F	48	32	28	60
Kirils Galoha	F	45	21	32	53
Emīls Ezītis	F	60	23	27	50
Georgijs Pujacs	D	60	16	25	41
Aleksejs Širokovs	F	52	13	25	38

Penalty minutes: Aleksejs Širokovs, 101

=== Season ===
==== Regular season ====
- Most goals in a season: Nikolajs Jeļisejevs, 19 (2019–20)
- Most assists in a season: Emīls Ezītis, 20 (2020–21)
- Most points in a season: Nikolajs Jeļisejevs, 36 (2019–20)
- Most penalty minutes in a season: Aleksandrs Jerofejevs, 68 (2019–20)

== Notable players ==
- Miķelis Rēdlihs
- Georgijs Pujacs
- Aleksandrs Jerofejevs
