= Vilmos Galló =

Hungarian ice hockey player (born 1996)

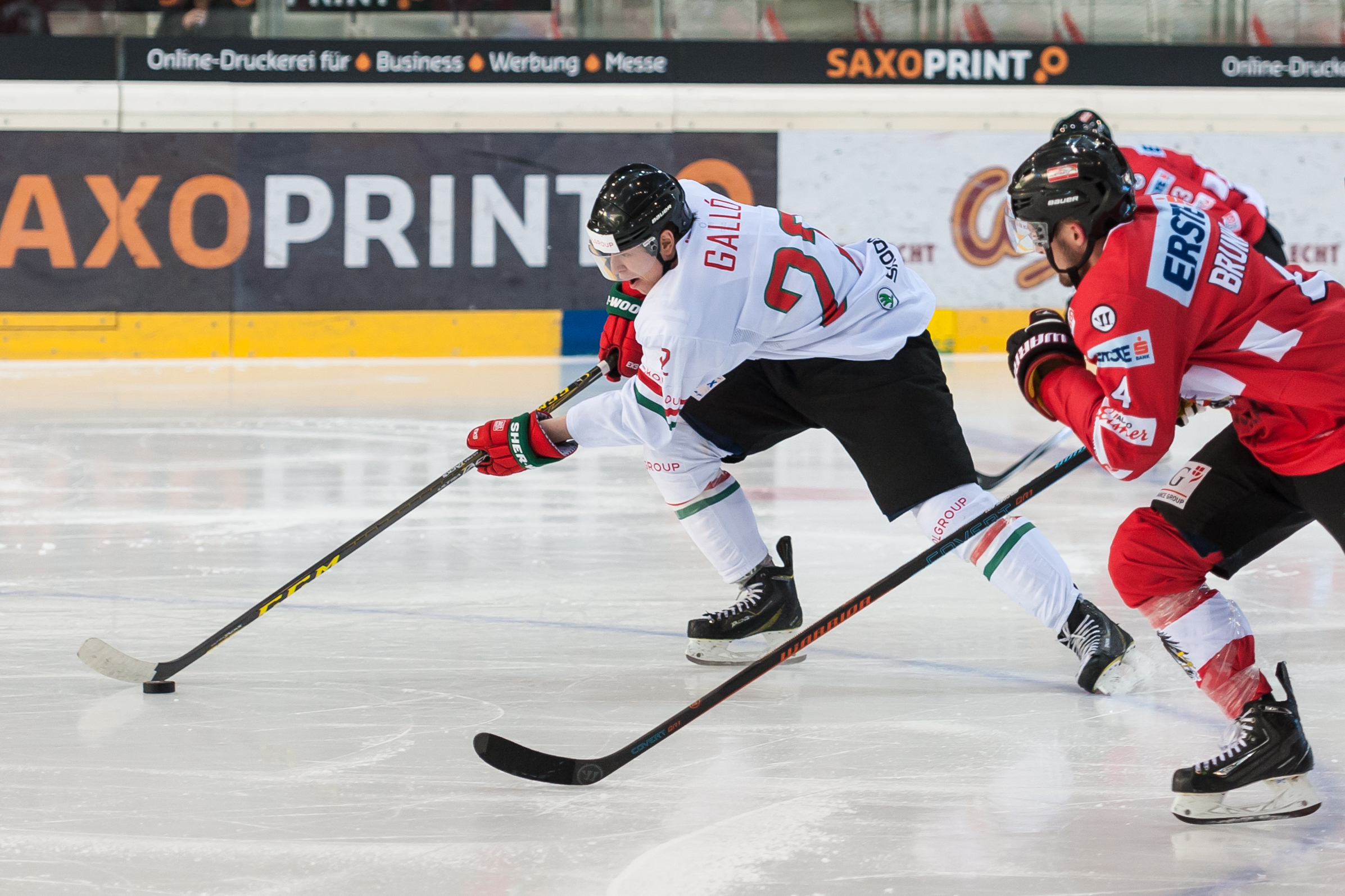
- Born: 31 July 1996 (age 29) Budapest, Hungary
- Height: 182 cm (6 ft 0 in)
- Weight: 85 kg (187 lb; 13 st 5 lb)
- Position: Forward
- Shoots: Left
- Liiga team Former teams: KooKoo; Linköping HC; Timrå IK; Luleå HF
- National team: Hungary
- Playing career: 2015–present

Vilmos Galló (born 31 July 1996) is a Hungarian professional ice hockey player who is a forward for KooKoo of the Liiga.

== Playing career ==
Galló has played the majority of his career in Sweden, beginning with Flemingsbergs IK in 2010 where he played for their J18 and J20 teams. In 2013, he joined Linköping HC and played in their junior teams up to the 2015–16 season where he made his debut on their main roster. He joined Timrå IK in 2017, playing initially in the HockeyAllsvenskan before their promotion to the Swedish Hockey League (SHL).

On 20 May 2019, Galló moved to Finland and signed with KooKoo of the Liiga. On 29 April 2021, he signed a two-year contract with Luleå HF. However, his stint with Luleå HF was short and on 14 November, Linköping HC announced that Galló was returning to the team.

=== International ===
Year	Team	Event	Result	GP	G	A	Pts	PIM
2013	Hungary	U20 (D2A)	1st	5	7	4	11	0
2014	Hungary	U18 (D1B)	1st	5	6	5	11	16
2014	Hungary	U20 (D1B)	6th	5	0	3	3	6
2015	Hungary	U20 (D2A)	1st	5	6	7	13	2
2016	Hungary	WC	15th	7	1	1	2	2
2017	Hungary	WC DIA	5th	5	0	2	2	2
2018	Hungary	WC DIA	4th	5	0	3	3	0
2019	Hungary	WC DIA	5th	5	1	1	2	6
2023	Hungary	WC	15th	7	1	1	2	6
2024	Hungary	WC DIA	1st	5	0	1	1	2
2025	Hungary	WC	14th	6	1	0	1	2
2026	Hungary	WC	14th	2	0	0	0	0
Junior totals				20	19	19	38	24
Senior totals				42	4	9	13	20
