= Frenks Razgals =

Latvian ice hockey player

- Born: 8 August 1996 (age 29) Riga, Latvia
- Height: 6 ft 1 in (185 cm)
- Weight: 179 lb (81 kg; 12 st 11 lb)
- Position: Forward
- Shoots: Left
- Czech2 team Former teams: HC RT Torax Poruba; Dinamo Riga; HK Rīga; HS Rīga; HK Liepāja; HC Vítkovice Ridera; AZ Havířov; HK Zemgale/LLU; JKH GKS Jastrzębie; HK Dukla Trenčín; HK Poprad
- National team: Latvia
- Playing career: 2013–present

Frenks Razgals (born 8 August 1996) is a Latvian professional ice hockey player who plays for AZ Havířov of the Czech 1.liga.

He's the son of Latvian coach and former ice hockey player, Aigars Razgals. Razgals represented Latvia at the 2017 and 2018 IIHF World Championships.

== Career statistics ==
=== Regular season and playoffs ===
			Regular season					Playoffs
Season	Team	League	GP	G	A	Pts	PIM	GP	G	A	Pts	PIM
2022–23	HK Dukla Trenčín	Slovak	3	1	0	1	0	—	—	—	—	—
2022–23	HK Poprad	Slovak	31	6	7	13	6	3	0	1	1	25
