= Gatis Sprukts =

Latvian ice hockey forward

- Born: August 29, 1996 (age 29) Jelgava, Latvia
- Height: 6 ft 1 in (185 cm)
- Weight: 179 lb (81 kg; 12 st 11 lb)
- Position: Forward
- Shoots: Left
- Latvia team Former teams: HK Olimp/Venta 2002; Dinamo Riga HK Zemgale/LLU HC Donbass
- National team: Latvia
- Playing career: 2015–present

Gatis Sprukts (born August 29, 1996) is a Latvian professional ice hockey forward currently playing for HK Olimp/Venta 2002 of the Latvian Hockey Higher League.

Sprukts played one game for Dinamo Riga during the 2015–16 KHL season. He later played in the Alps Hockey League for EC Kitzbühel and in the FFHG Division 1 for Albatros de Brest before joining HK Zemgale on July 31, 2019.
