= Aron Reisz =

Hungarian ice hockey player (born 1995)

Áron Reisz
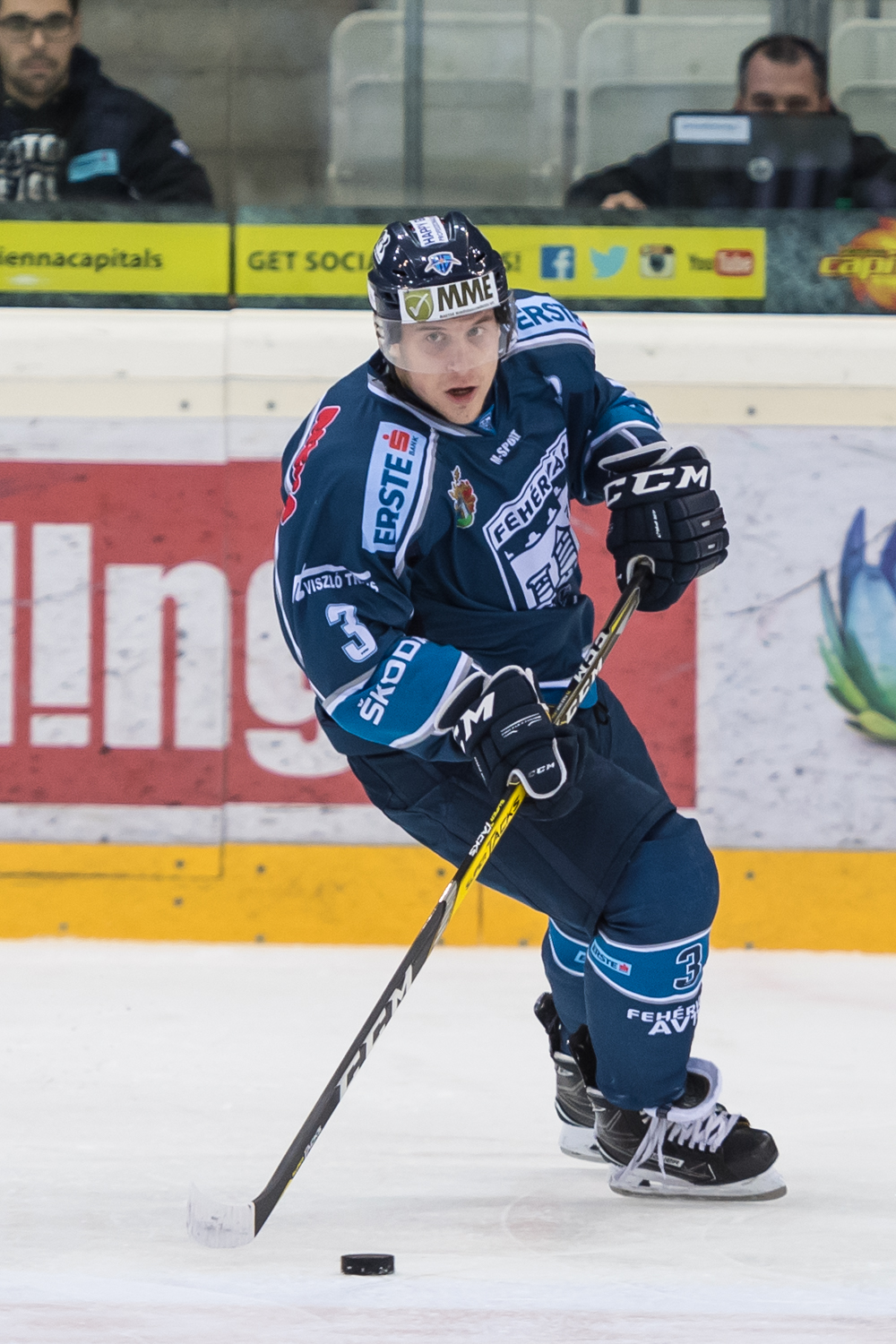
- Born: 7 March 1995 (age 31) Miercurea Ciuc, Romania
- Height: 5 ft 10 in (178 cm)
- Weight: 194 lb (88 kg; 13 st 12 lb)
- Position: Center
- Shoots: Right
- National team: Hungary
- Playing career: 2015–present

Aron Reisz (born 7 March 1995) is a Romanian and Hungarian professional ice hockey player. Reisz has played for several years in Hungary's top clubs (Fehérvár AV19) in Austria's first league, participated in several World Championships at the junior level, and has 24 appearances for the Hungarian national team. Reisz spent one season in Germany with the Heilbronner Falken before returning to play for his hometown team (Sportklub Csikszereda) in Miercurea Ciuc.

== Early life ==
He began his career in Miercurea Ciuc, a small Romanian town inhabited by Hungarians, where ice hockey has a long history and is regarded as a true religion by the People.

In the 2008–2009 season, Reisz Aron played for the Miercurea Ciuc where he captained the team to victory in the under-14 Hungarian Youth Championship.

In 2010, Reisz Aron moved to Hungary to further his ice hockey career.

== Hungarian career ==
During the 2010–2011 season, Reisz joined the Ferencvárosi Torna Club and led the team to victory in the under-18 championship. This gold medal was a significant achievement for the ice hockey club, as it was their first championship title in this age category in 30 years.

In the 2011–2012 season, Reisz played for the renowned Hungarian club Fehérvár AV19 in Székesfehérvár. Once again, he secured the championship in the under-18 category.

Reisz won both the Austrian und Hungarian under-20 championships in the 2012–2013 season with the Team Fehérvár AV19. He debuted in the Hungarian national team and earned a gold medal at the Division II A under-18 World Championship.

In the 2013–2014 season, Reisz again won the Hungarian in the under-20 category and secured second place in the Austrian championship. Additionally, he played for the Hungarian national team, winning the World Championship in Division II A in the under-20 category.

Reisz continued his streak of success in the 2014–2015 season by winning both the Hungarian and Austrian championships in the under-20 category with Fehérvár AV19.

== Professional career ==
The 2015–2016 season marked Reisz’s entry into the senior league. He played in the Hungarian championship and for the Hungarian national team too.

From the 2016–2017 season to the 2020–2021 season, Reisz was an essential player for Fehérvár AV19 in the Austrian Erste Liga. During this time, he achieved several significant titles:

- 2018–2019 Season: Hungarian Cup Champion
- 2019–2020 Season: Hungarian Supercup Gold Medalist

Reisz Aron began the 2020–2021 season with Fehérvár AV19 but soon joined to play as a contingent player in Germany for the Heilbronner Falken. This move marked a new chapter in his career.

In the 2021–2022 season, Reisz returned to his hometown to play for Miercurea Ciuc (Sportklub Csikszereda). He had a standout season, achieving first place in the Hungarian-Romanian League and winning gold medals in both the Romanian Championship and the Romanian Cup.
