= Kārlis Čukste =

Latvian ice hockey player (born 1997)

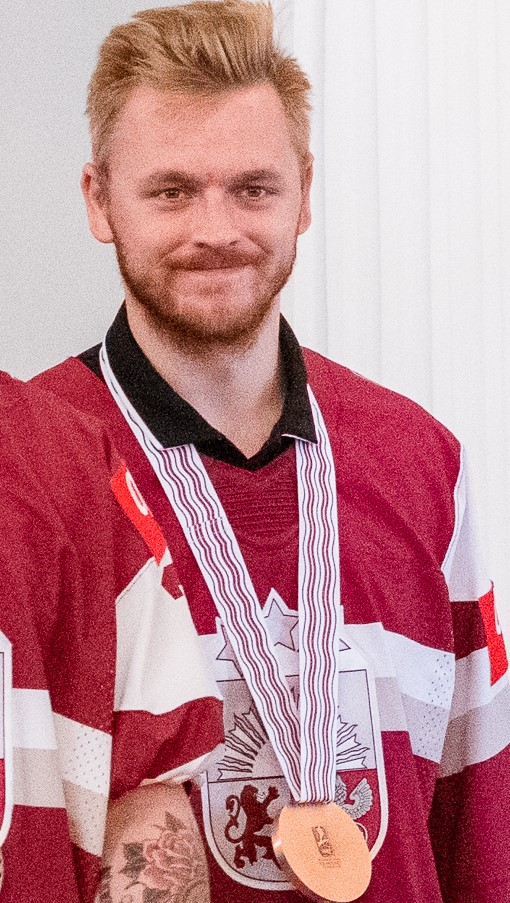
- Čukste in 2023
- Born: 17 June 1997 (age 28) Riga, Latvia
- Height: 188 cm (6 ft 2 in)
- Weight: 92 kg (203 lb; 14 st 7 lb)
- Position: defence
- Shot: Left
- Played for: HK Mogo; Dinamo Riga; Lahti Pelicans; HC Oceláři Třinec
- National team: Latvia
- NHL draft: 130th overall, 2015; San Jose Sharks
- Playing career: 2020–2024

Kārlis Čukste (born 17 June 1997) is a Latvian former professional ice hockey player who is a defenceman.

His father, Ainārs Čukste, is a Latvian basketball coach, while his mother, Baiba Čukste, is the former captain of the Latvian women's ice hockey team.

== Biography ==
He started his career as a member of SK Rīga 16. In its ranks in 2012–13. became the Latvian U-18 champion in the following season. In the following season, he already played in the Latvian U-20 league for the team. 2014–15 spent the season in the MHL unit HK Riga.

After the end of the season, Chuksti was selected by the San Jose Sharks in the 2015 NHL draft. He already spent the next season in North America, with the USHL team Chicago Steel. In the spring of 2016, it became known that next season the defender would play for the Quinnipiac University team in the NCAA Championship. He played in its ranks until 2020.

In the summer of 2020, Chukste signed a contract with the San Jose Barracuda of the American Hockey League. Due to the delay in the start of the hockey season in North America due to the COVID-19 pandemic, 2020–21 Čukste started the season with the Latvian championship club HK Mogo. 2021–2022. The first part of the season was played by Riga "Dinamo," but it ended with the Finnish team Pelicans Lahti. 2022–2023. In the season of 2008, he represented the Czech Extraliga club Oceláři" of Tršinec, winning the championship title. He joined Brynäs IF in Sweden's second-strongest league, Hockeyallsvenskan, in July 2023 and also win championship title.

He played for the Latvian hockey team in 2015. 2014 World Junior Championships, as well as the 2014 and 2015 World Youth Championships. Čukste initially was included in the Latvian national team for 2022 Winter Olympics but was withdrawn from the squad on the day of departure due to a positive COVID-19 test. The Latvian national team was represented at the World Championship for the first time in 2022. Čukste also played for the Latvian national team at the 2023 World Championship and won a bronze medal.
