= Ilya Lobanov =

Kazakhstani ice hockey player

- Born: 1 December 1996 (age 29) Rudny, Kazakhstan
- Height: 6 ft 6 in (198 cm)
- Weight: 212 lb (96 kg; 15 st 2 lb)
- Position: Defenceman
- Shot: Left
- Played for: Barys Astana
- National team: Kazakhstan
- Playing career: 2015–2023

Ilya Igorevich Lobanov (Russian: Илья Игоревич Лобанов; born 1 December 1996) is a Kazakhstani former ice hockey defenceman who played for Barys Astana of the Kontinental Hockey League.

== International play ==
Lobanov represented the Kazakhstan national team at the 2016 IIHF World Championship.
