= Hugo Gallet =

French ice hockey player (born 1997)

- Born: 20 June 1997 (age 28) Amiens, France
- Height: 1.92 m (6 ft 4 in)
- Weight: 94 kg (207 lb; 14 st 11 lb)
- Position: Defence
- Shoots: Left
- Liiga team Former teams: KalPa; IPK; Boxers de Bordeaux
- National team: France
- NHL draft: Undrafted
- Playing career: 2018–present

Hugo Gallet (born 20 June 1997) is a French professional ice hockey player who is a defenceman for KalPa of the Liiga.

Gallet previously played in the Ligue Magnus for Boxers de Bordeaux before joining IPK on June 14, 2019. He is also a member of the French national team and represented France at the 2018 and 2019 IIHF World Championship.
