= Kirils Galoha =

Latvian ice hockey forward

- Born: April 16, 1996 (age 28); Riga, Latvia
- Height: 6 ft 0 in (183 cm)
- Weight: 159 lb (72 kg; 11 st 5 lb)
- Position: Forward
- Shoots: Right
- PHL team Former teams: GKS Tychy; Dinamo Riga; HS Rīga; HK Mogo; Olimp Riga
- National team: Latvia
- Playing career: 2016–present

Kirils Galoha (born April 16, 1996) is a Latvian professional ice hockey forward who plays for GKS Tychy of the Polska Hokej Liga.

Galoha played one game in the Kontinental Hockey League for Dinamo Riga during the 2015–16 KHL season. He departed from the team in 2017, splitting the year in the Latvian Hockey Higher League for HS Rīga and later in the German Oberliga for ECDC Memmingen. He would also divide the 2018–19 season between Latvia and Germany, playing one game for HK Mogo before joining Oberliga side EHC Waldkraiburg. He also played ten games in France for Division 1 side Bisons de Neuilly-sur-Marne.

Galoha joined Kazakhstan team Saryarka Karagandy of the Vysshaya Hockey Liga on June 10, 2019 but only played two games for the team before returning to Latvia to join the newly-founded Olimp Riga on September 23, 2019. On January 14, 2020, Galoha joined GKS Tychy of the Polska Hokej Liga. He became Polish champion. Next season he returned to Olimp Riga, winning also the Latvian league champion title.
