= Seo Yeong-jun =

South Korean ice hockey player

- Born: 8 March 1995 (age 30); Seoul, South Korea
- Height: 183 cm (6 ft 0 in)
- Weight: 80 kg (176 lb; 12 st 8 lb)
- Position: Defenceman
- Shoots: Right
- ALIH team: Daemyung Killer Whales
- National team: South Korea
- Playing career: 2016–present

Seo Yeong-jun (born 8 March 1995) is a South Korean ice hockey player. He competed in the 2018 Winter Olympics.
