= Lewis Hook =

English ice hockey player (born 1996)

- Born: 18 August 1996 (age 29) Peterborough, England
- Height: 1.83 m (6 ft 0 in)
- Weight: 82 kg (181 lb; 12 st 13 lb)
- Position: Left wing
- Shoots: Left
- EIHL team Former teams: Manchester Storm; Peterborough Phantoms; Milton Keynes Lightning; Coventry Blaze; Nottingham Panthers; EC Kitzbühel; Belfast Giants; Guildford Flames
- National team: Great Britain
- NHL draft: Undrafted
- Playing career: 2015–present

Lewis Hook (born 18 August 1996) is an English ice hockey player for Elite Ice Hockey League (EIHL) side Manchester Storm and the British national team.

He represented Great Britain at the 2021 IIHF World Championship and 2022 IIHF World Championship.
