= 2019 World Junior Ice Hockey Championships – Division II =

International ice hockey tournament

2019 IIHF U20 World Championship Division II
Tournament details
- Host countries: Estonia; Croatia
- Venues: 2 (in 2 host cities)
- Dates: 13–19 January 2019; 15–21 January 2019
- Teams: 12

The 2019 World Junior Ice Hockey Championship Division II consisted of two tiered groups of six teams each: the fourth-tier Division II A and the fifth-tier Division II B. For each tier's tournament, the first-placed team was promoted to a higher division, while the last-placed team was relegated to a lower division.

The tournaments were played in a round-robin tournament format, with two points allotted for a win, one additional point for a regulation win, and one point for an overtime or game winning shots loss.

To be eligible as a junior, a player couldn't be born earlier than 1999.

Division II A was held in Tallinn, Estonia, while Division II B was hosted in Zagreb, Croatia.

== Division II A ==
2019 IIHF U20 World Championship Division II A

Tournament details
- Host country: Estonia
- City: Tallinn
- Venue: 1 (in 1 host city)
- Dates: 13–19 January 2019
- Teams: 6

Tournament statistics
- Games played: 15
- Goals scored: 105 (7 per game)
- Attendance: 11,195 (746 per game)
- Scoring leader: (United Kingdom) Liam Kirk (14 points)

Official website
- www.iihf.com

The Division II A tournament was played in Tallinn, Estonia, from 13 to 19 January 2019.

=== Participating teams ===
Team	Qualification
Lithuania	placed 6th in Division I B last year and were relegated
South Korea	placed 2nd in Division II A last year
Great Britain	placed 3rd in Division II A last year
Estonia	hosts; placed 4th in Division II A last year
Romania	placed 5th in Division II A last year
Spain	placed 1st in Division II B last year and were promoted

=== Final standings ===
Pos	Team	Pld	W	OTW	OTL	L	GF	GA	GD	Pts	Promotion or relegation
1	Estonia (H)	5	4	1	0	0	25	7	+18	14	Promoted to the 2020 Division I B
2	Lithuania	5	3	0	2	0	22	12	+10	11	
3	Great Britain	5	3	0	0	2	30	16	+14	9	
4	Romania	5	1	2	0	2	13	20	−7	7	
5	Spain	5	1	0	0	4	8	18	−10	3	
6	South Korea	5	0	0	1	4	7	32	−25	1	Relegated to the 2020 Division II B

Source: IIHF
Rules for classification: 1) points; 2) head-to-head points; 3) head-to-head goal difference; 4) head-to-head number of goals scored; 5) result against closest best-ranked team outside tied teams; 6) result against second-best ranked team outside tied teams; 7) seeding before tournament.
(H) Host

=== Match results ===
All times are local. (Eastern European Time – UTC+2)

13 January 2019; 13:00	South Korea	1–2 OT (1–0, 0–1, 0–0) (OT: 0–1)	Romania	Tondiraba Ice Hall, Tallinn; Attendance: 153

Game reference

Kim Tae-kyung
Goalies
Örs Adorjan
Referee:
(Norway) Robert Hallin
Linesmen:
(Norway) Knut Braten
(Switzerland) Sandro Gurtner

Yang (Park) – 11:31	1–0
	1–1	34:10 – Karda (Filip)
	1–2	62:43 – Filip (Cășăneanu)

8 min
Penalties
4 min
32
Shots
35

13 January 2019; 16:30	Spain	1–2 (0–1, 1–1, 0–0)	Estonia	Tondiraba Ice Hall, Tallinn; Attendance: 1,514

Game reference

Raul Barbo
Goalies
Oliver Soovik
Referee:
(Switzerland) Micha Hebeisen
Linesmen:
(Germany) Killian Hinterdobler
(Slovakia) Jozef Tvrdoň

	0–1	02:29 – Jürgens (Novikov, Hast)
Donath (O'Hare) – 20:54	1–1
	1–2	36:06 – Lodeikin (Slessarevski, Jõgi) (PP)

37 min
Penalties
39 min
23
Shots
33

13 January 2019; 20:00	Great Britain	4–6 (0–4, 2–1, 2–1)	Lithuania	Tondiraba Ice Hall, Tallinn; Attendance: 356

Game reference

Jordan McLaughlin
William Kerlin
Goalies
Laurynas Lubys
Referee:
(Croatia) Filip Metzinger
Linesmen:
(Romania) Botond Redai
(United States) Patrick Richardson

	0–1	01:55 – Washco (Grinius, Motiejunas) (PP)
	0–2	03:18 – Grinius (Gusevas) (PP)
	0–3	07:59 – Grinius (Washco)
	0–4	16:54 – Misiuk (Gusevas) (PP)
Waller (Kirk) – 29:24	1–4
Buesa (Pound) (PP) – 36:56	2–4
	2–5	38:25 – Washco
Neilson (Buesa) (PP) – 45:42	3–5
	3–6	55:06 – Washco (SH)
Gulliver (Waller, Buesa) (EA) – 58:22	4–6

10 min
Penalties
12 min
54
Shots
19

14 January 2019; 13:00	Romania	3–2 (1–2, 1–0, 1–0)	Spain	Tondiraba Ice Hall, Tallinn; Attendance: 103

Game reference

Örs Adorjan
Goalies
Raul Barbo
Referee:
(Croatia) Filip Metzinger
Linesmen:
(Germany) Killian Hinterdobler
(United States) Patrik Richardson

	0–1	07:02 – Sarmiento (Zaballa)
	0–2	10:42 – Zaballa (Capillas)
Filip (Vasile, Todor) – 18:19	1–2
Reszegh (Vizi) – 33:41	2–2
Cășăneanu (Vasile, Filip) – 54:36	3–2

2 min
Penalties
4 min
44
Shots
37

14 January 2019; 16:30	South Korea	1–13 (0–3, 0–5, 1–5)	Great Britain	Tondiraba Ice Hall, Tallinn; Attendance: 235

Game reference

Kim Tae-kyung
Bae Sang-won
Goalies
Jordan McLaughlin
Referee:
(Switzerland) Micha Hebeisen
Linesmen:
(Norway) Knut Braten
(Romania) Botond Redai

	0–1	02:47 – Waller (Kirk)
	0–2	04:07 – Smith (Howlett)
	0–3	11:05 – Smith (Howlett, Gulliver)
	0–4	23:54 – Pizzo (Neilson, Alderson)
	0–5	25:39 – Buesa (Neilson, Alderson) (PP)
	0–6	30:26 – Waller (Kirk, Brown)
	0–7	32:23 – Cooper (Kelsall)
	0–8	34:10 – Buesa (Hazeldine, Kirk) (PP)
	0–9	41:16 – Smith (Howlett)
Park (Yang) – 45:03	1–9
	1–10	46:17 – Waller (Brown, Smith)
	1–11	46:33 – Brown (Kirk)
	1–12	52:27 – Alderson (Neilson, Pizzo)
	1–13	53:53 – Kirk (Brown, Waller)

16 min
Penalties
8 min
23
Shots
60

14 January 2019; 20:00	Lithuania	1–2 GWS (0–0, 0–1, 1–0) (OT: 0–0) (SO: 0–1)	Estonia	Tondiraba Ice Hall, Tallinn; Attendance: 1,830

Game reference
Laurynas Lubys	Goalies	Christopher Jõgi	Referee: (Slovenia) Milan Zrnič; Linesmen: (Canada) Cody Huseby (Slovakia) Jozef Tvrdoň
/ 0–1 / 34:46 – Linde (Novikov (Kuznetsov) (PP); Binkulis (Jankauskas) – 45:33 / 1–1			Referee: (Slovenia) Milan Zrnič; Linesmen: (Canada) Cody Huseby (Slovakia) Jozef Tvrdoň
Washco (miss); Misiuk (miss); Grinius (miss); Ragas (miss)	Shootout	(miss) Linde; Jürgens; Aleksandrov	Referee: (Slovenia) Milan Zrnič; Linesmen: (Canada) Cody Huseby (Slovakia) Jozef Tvrdoň
12 min	Penalties	22 min	Referee: (Slovenia) Milan Zrnič; Linesmen: (Canada) Cody Huseby (Slovakia) Jozef Tvrdoň
30	Shots	37	Referee: (Slovenia) Milan Zrnič; Linesmen: (Canada) Cody Huseby (Slovakia) Jozef Tvrdoň

16 January 2019; 13:00	Lithuania	4–5 OT (1–1, 2–2, 1–1) (OT: 0–1)	Romania	Tondiraba Ice Hall, Tallinn; Attendance: 150

Game reference

Laurynas Lubys
Goalies
Örs Adorjan
Referee:
(Slovenia) Milan Zrnič
Linesmen:
(Norway) Knut Braten
(Slovakia) Jozef Tvrdoň

Kudrevičius (Ragas) – 00:52	1–0
	1–1	01:47 – Vasile
Rumševičius (Binkulis) (PP) – 21:45	2–1
	2–2	23:30 – Vizi (Reszegh)
Washco (Krukovski) – 27:12	3–2
	3–3	36:51 – Buzas (Reszegh, Vizi) (PP)
	3–4	56:10 – Vizi (Szabó, Reszegh) (PP)
Jankauskas (Steponavičius) – 56:23	4–4
	4–5	64:45 – Resezegh (Vizi)

22 min
Penalties
24 min
39
Shots
37

16 January 2019; 16:30	South Korea	2–3 (1–2, 1–0, 0–1)	Spain	Tondiraba Ice Hall, Tallinn; Attendance: 201

Game reference

Kim Tae-kyung
Goalies
Raul Barbo
Referee:
(Switzerland) Micha Hebeisen
Linesmen:
(Switzerland) Sandro Gurtner
(Romania) Botond Redai

Jee H. (Yang) – 00:57	1–0
	1–1	08:54 – Rubio (O'Hare, Donath)
	1–2	14:11 – Sarasa (Giménez)
Yang (Kim G.) – 32:04	2–2
	2–3	44:34 – Alberdi (Sarmiento) (PP)

14 min
Penalties
8 min
28
Shots
39

16 January 2019; 20:00	Great Britain	2–5 (0–1, 1–2, 1–2)	Estonia	Tondiraba Ice Hall, Tallinn; Attendance: 1,558

Game reference

Jordan McLaughlin
Goalies
Christopher Jõgi
Referee:
(Norway) Rober Hallin
Linesmen:
(Canada) Cody Huseby
(United States) Patrick Richardson

	0–1	19:09 – Aleksandrov (Novikov, Linde) (PP)
	0–2	24:19 – K. Jõgi (Kiik) (PP)
Kirk – 26:06	1–2
	1–3	32:42 – Hast (Svartbro, Novikov)
Kirk (Waller, Bradley) – 45:28	2–3
	2–4	48:49 – Kiik (K. Jõgi, Anufrijev)
	2–5	52:14 – Aleksandrov (Puzakov)

16 min
Penalties
6 min
25
Shots
34

17 January 2019; 13:00	Spain	0–4 (0–1, 0–2, 0–1)	Lithuania	Tondiraba Ice Hall, Tallinn; Attendance: 225

Game reference

Raul Barbo
Goalies
Laurynas Lubys
Referee:
(Norway) Robert Hallin
Linesmen:
(Norway) Knut Braten
(Switzerland) Sandro Gurtner

0–1	04:50 – Binkulis (Kudrevičius, Stankius)
0–2	27:41 – Krukovski (Washco, Grinius)
0–3	29:42 – Grinius (Washco, Ragas)
0–4	46:47 – Krukovski (Grinius, Washco)

8 min
Penalties
6 min
26
Shots
34

17 January 2019; 16:30	Romania	2–4 (0–1, 2–3, 0–0)	Great Britain	Tondiraba Ice Hall, Tallinn; Attendance: 354

Game reference

Örs Adorjan
Goalies
Jordan McLaughlin
Referee:
(Slovenia) Milan Zrnič
Linesmen:
(Germany) Killian Hinterdobler
(United States) Patrick Richardson

	0–1	09:08 – Kirk (Waller, Brown) (PP)
	0–2	20:12 – Cooper (Kelsall, Kirk) (PP)
	0–3	20:43 – Brown (Kirk, Bradley)
	0–4	25:21 – Kirk (Howlett, Cooper)
Vizi (Szabó, Reszegh) (PP) – 27:36	1–4
Casaneau (Vasile) – 32:02	2–4

12 min
Penalties
12 min
23
Shots
40

17 January 2019; 20:00	Estonia	7–2 (0–0, 2–0, 5–2)	South Korea	Tondiraba Ice Hall, Tallinn; Attendance: 1,730

Game reference

Oliver Soovik
Goalies
Kim Tae-kyung
Referee:
(Croatia) Filip Metzinger
Linesmen:
(Canada) Cody Huseby
(Romania) Botond Redai

Jõgi (Kiik) – 28:26	1–0
Svartbro (Slessarevski) – 33:40	2–0
	2–1	41:04 – Kim S. (Park) (PP)
	2–2	42:08 – Kim G. (Jin, Yang) (PP)
Linde (Jürgens, Jansson) (SH) – 43:15	3–2
Nevzorov (Savenkov, Laosma) – 47:30	4–2
Novikov (Linde) (PP2) – 49:25	5–2
Lodeikin (Kiik) (PP) – 49:58	6–2
Savenkov – 52:20	7–2

31 min
Penalties
14 min
48
Shots
18

19 January 2019; 13:00	Great Britain	7–2 (2–2, 2–0, 3–0)	Spain	Tondiraba Ice Hall, Tallinn; Attendance: 115

Game reference

William Kerlin
Goalies
Raul Barbo
Referee:
(Norway) Robert Hallin
Linesmen:
(Croatia) Filip Metzinger
(Canada) Cody Huseby

	0–1	00:39 – Zaballa
Neilson (Alderson) – 02:37	1–1
	1–2	09:05 – Mendizabal (Sánchez)
Waller (Kirk, Cooper) (PP) – 13:56	2–2
Cooper (Kelsall) – 26:48	3–2
Buesa (Alderson) – 32:01	4–2
Buesa (Neilson, Alderson) – 42:23	5–2
Howlett (Brown) (SH, ENG) – 51:22	6–2
Cooper (Smith, Kirk) – 55:57	7–2

12 min
Penalties
12 min
25
Shots
22

19 January 2019; 16:30	Lithuania	7–1 (2–0, 3–1, 2–0)	South Korea	Tondiraba Ice Hall, Tallinn; Attendance: 121

Game reference

Laurynas Lubys
Goalies
Kim Tae-kyung
Referee:
(Slovenia) Milan Zrnič
Linesmen:
(Norway) Knut Braten
(Romania) Botond Redai

Krukovski (Gusevas) – 19:02	1–0
Ragas (Misiuk, Kudrevičius) – 19:17	2–0
Misiuk (Grinius) – 22:38	3–0
Silinas (Binkulis) – 23:49	4–0
Jankauskas (Motiejunas, Binkulas) (PP)	5–0
	5–1	31:20 – Yang (Jin, Kim G.)
Domeika (Misiuk) (PP2) – 41:25	6–1
Misiuk (Ragas) (PP2) – 59:25	7–1

14 min
Penalties
14 min
44
Shots
24

19 January 2019; 20:00	Estonia	9–1 (2–1, 1–0, 6–0)	Romania	Tondiraba Ice Hall, Tallinn; Attendance: 2,550

Game reference

Christopher Jõgi
Oliver Soovik
Goalies
Örs Adorjan
Magor Szopos
Referee:
(Switzerland) Micha Hebeisen
Linesmen:
(Germany) Killian Hinterdobler
(Slovakia) Jozef Tvrdoň

	0–1	05:59 – Cășăneanu (Filip)
Lodeikin (Kiik, K. Jõgi) (PP) – 10:51	1–1
Laosma (K. Jõgi) – 11:21	2–1
Lodeikin (Kiik, Jürgens) (PP) – 30:27	3–1
Puzakov (Slessarevski) – 43:09	4–1
Novikov (Hast) (PP) – 44:15	5–1
Hast (Nevzorov) – 46:11	6–1
Kuznetsov (Slessarevski, Hast) (PP) – 48:16	7–1
Jürgens (SH) – 50:50	8–1
K. Jõgi (Jürgens) – 58:01	9–1

8 min
Penalties
14 min
50
Shots
16

=== Statistics ===
==== Top 10 scorers ====
Pos	Player	Country	GP	G	A	Pts	+/–	PIM
1	Liam Kirk	Great Britain	5	5	9	14	+8	4
2	Joshua Waller	Great Britain	5	5	4	9	+5	0
3	Lukas Washco	Lithuania	4	4	4	8	+4	4
4	Jordan Buesa	Great Britain	5	5	2	7	+2	2
5	Martynas Grinius	Lithuania	5	3	4	7	+6	16
5	Kristofer Jõgi	Estonia	5	3	4	7	+3	6
7	Kieran Brown	Great Britain	5	2	5	7	+5	4
8	Tyler Cooper	Great Britain	5	4	2	6	+2	2
9	Adam Vizi	Romania	5	3	3	6	+1	2
9	Yang Junk-yung	South Korea	5	3	3	6	–3	16

GP = Games played; G = Goals; A = Assists; Pts = Points; +/− = Plus–minus; PIM = Penalties In Minutes
Source: IIHF

==== Goaltending leaders ====
(minimum 40% team's total ice time)

Pos	Player	Country	TOI	GA	Sv%	GAA	SO
1	Kristofer Jõgi	Estonia	183:00	6	94.37	1.31	0
2	Laurynas Lubys	Lithuania	309:45	11	93.79	2.13	1
3	Oliver Soovik	Estonia	122:00	3	92.50	1.48	0
4	Örs Adorján	Romania	293:39	17	90.96	3.47	0
5	Raul Barbo	Estonia	294:50	17	89.57	3.46	0

TOI = Time On Ice (minutes:seconds); GA = Goals against; GAA = Goals against average; Sv% = Save percentage; SO = Shutouts
Source: IIHF

=== Awards ===
==== Best Players Selected by the Directorate ====
- Goaltender: (Lithuania) Laurynas Lubys
- Defenceman: (Estonia) Saveli Novikov
- Forward: (United Kingdom) Liam Kirk

== Division II B ==
2019 IIHF U20 World Championship Division II B

Tournament details
- Host country: Croatia
- City: Zagreb
- Venue: 1 (in 1 host city)
- Dates: 15–21 January 2019
- Teams: 6

Tournament statistics
- Games played: 15
- Goals scored: 109 (7.27 per game)
- Attendance: 7,446 (496 per game)
- Scoring leader: (Croatia) Dominic Čanić (11 points)

Official website
- www.iihf.com

The Division II B tournament was played in Zagreb, Croatia, from 15 to 21 January 2019.

=== Participating teams ===
Team	Qualification
Netherlands	placed 6th in Division II A last year and were relegated
Serbia	placed 2nd in Division II B last year
Croatia	hosts; placed 3rd in Division II B last year
Belgium	placed 4th in Division II B last year
Mexico	placed 5th in Division II B last year
Israel	placed 1st in Division III last year and were promoted

=== Final standings ===
Pos	Team	Pld	W	OTW	OTL	L	GF	GA	GD	Pts	Promotion or relegation
1	Serbia	5	5	0	0	0	26	5	+21	15	Promoted to the 2020 Division II A
2	Croatia (H)	5	4	0	0	1	18	9	+9	12	
3	Netherlands	5	3	0	0	2	25	22	+3	9	
4	Belgium	5	2	0	0	3	22	24	−2	6	
5	Israel	5	1	0	0	4	12	21	−9	3	
6	Mexico	5	0	0	0	5	6	28	−22	0	Relegated to the 2020 Division III

Source: IIHF
Rules for classification: 1) points; 2) head-to-head points; 3) head-to-head goal difference; 4) head-to-head number of goals scored; 5) result against closest best-ranked team outside tied teams; 6) result against second-best ranked team outside tied teams; 7) seeding before tournament.
(H) Host

=== Match results ===
All times are local. (Central European Time – UTC+1)

15 January 2019; 13:00	Israel	3–6 (0–1, 1–1, 2–4)	Belgium	Dom Sportova, Zagreb; Attendance: 100

Game reference

Raz Werner
Goalies
Ignace Van Noten
Referee:
(Slovakia) Vladimír Snášel
Linesmen:
(Italy) Nicola Basso
(Croatia) Krešimir Polašek

	0–1	07:38 – James (Versin)
Halpert (Nykhaychuk) – 20:43	1–1
	1–2	34:00 – James (Laermans)
	1–3	41:10 – Coolen (Vervoort, De Ceuster)
Bachinski (Halpert) (PP) – 43:51	2–3
	2–4	44:36 – James (Vervoort, De Ceuster) (SH)
	2–5	51:44 – Versin (James)
Bachinski (Halpert) – 57:27	3–5
	3–6	59:52 – Swennen (James, Huyghe) (PP)

26 min
Penalties
8 min
17
Shots
58

15 January 2019; 16:30	Serbia	6–1 (1–1, 1–0, 4–0)	Mexico	Dom Sportova, Zagreb; Attendance: 132

Game reference

Jug Mitić
Bojan Vasić
Goalies
Sebastian de la Vega
Referee:
(Kazakhstan) Vladimir Yefremov
Linesmen:
(Croatia) Marko Šaković
(Poland) Wiktor Zień

Dragović (Subotić) – 03:05	1–0
	1–1	10:58 – Apud (Dunn)
Grković (Subotić, Španjević) – 28:57	2–1
Dragović (Đumić) – 43:30	3–1
Mirkov (Racić, Španjević) – 45:33	4–1
Anđelković (Marinković, Stojsavljević) – 58:25	5–1
Đumić (Kastel, Ćurčić) – 59:13	6–1

10 min
Penalties
6 min
35
Shots
13

15 January 2019; 20:00	Croatia	7–0 (1–0, 2–0, 4–0)	Netherlands	Dom Sportova, Zagreb; Attendance: 966

Game reference

Domagoj Troha
Goalies
Jaimy Missler
Referee:
(Norway) Marcus Wannerstedt
Linesmen:
(Finland) Joona Elonen
(France) Clement Goncalves

N. Kramirić (Dobrić) – 17:09	1–0
Čanić (Trstenjak) (PP) – 32:41	2–0
Zanoff (Čanić, Burzin) – 39:04	3–0
Paulović (Čanić) – 41:31	4–0
Hanzek (Joja) – 45:06	5–0
L. Kramarić (Zanoff) (PP) – 51:04	6–0
Čanić (Dobrić) (SH) – 54:18	7–0

24 min
Penalties
28 min
28
Shots
29

16 January 2019; 13:00	Mexico	1–5 (0–2, 0–2, 1–1)	Israel	Dom Sportova, Zagreb; Attendance: 197

Game reference

Sebastian de la Vega
Gerardo Garcia del Valle
Goalies
Yehonatan Reisinger
Referee:
(Germany) Marc Iwert
Linesmen:
(Italy) Daniel Rigoni
(Croatia) Marko Šaković

	0–1	09:02 – Halpert (Merkulov)
	0–2	19:55 – Aharonovich (Avraham, Halpert) (PP)
	0–3	29:57 – Halpert (Mostovoy, Hoffman)
	0–4	38:46 – Marziko (Mostovoy) (PP)
Matsubara (Apud) – 44:16	1–4
	1–5	53:51 – Merkulov (Mostovoy, Hoffman) (PP)

14 min
Penalties
12 min
31
Shots
29

16 January 2019; 16:30	Netherlands	9–4 (3–1, 4–1, 2–2)	Belgium	Dom Sportova, Zagreb; Attendance: 146

Game reference

Sander Kosters
Goalies
Ignace Van Noten
Cisse Vander Weyde
Referee:
(Kazakhstan) Vladimir Yefremov
Linesmen:
(Croatia) Krešimir Polašek
(Poland) Wiktor Zień

Sars (Klem, D. Hessels) (PP) – 04:22	1–0
Sikma (Makarin, Van Elten) – 04:44	2–0
	2–1	09:10 – Laeremans
Sars (D. Hessels) – 18:40	3–1
De Ruiter (N. Hessels, Geerligs) – 21:56	4–1
Van Elten (Sars) – 24:24	5–1
D. Hessels (Jacobs, Van Elten) – 27:10	6–1
	6–2	35:43 – Cuylaerts (Coolen) (PP)
Klem (Gerretsen, Sikma) (PP) – 39:59	7–2
	7–3	44:07 – Swennen (Auger)
	7–4	47:54 – James (Swennen) (PP)
Sars (Jacobs) – 52:34	8–4
Jacobs (D. Hessels, Sars) – 57:32	9–4

10 min
Penalties
8 min
38
Shots
44

16 January 2019; 20:00	Serbia	4–1 (1–0, 1–0, 2–1)	Croatia	Dom Sportova, Zagreb; Attendance: 2,234

Game reference

Jug Mitić
Goalies
Domagoj Troha
Referee:
(Slovakia) Vladimír Snášel
Linesmen:
(Italy) Nicola Basso
(France) Clement Goncalves

Anđelković (Španjević) – 04:58	1–0
Mirkov (Popović) – 37:54	2–0
Dragović (Đumić) – 41:17	3–0
Subotić (Španjević) (PP2) – 43:42	4–0
	4–1	58:12 – Dobrić (Zanoff, Sutevski)

12 min
Penalties
20 min
43
Shots
23

18 January 2019; 13:00	Netherlands	7–2 (1–0, 3–2, 3–0)	Mexico	Dom Sportova, Zagreb

Game reference

Sander Kosters
Goalies
Gerardo Garcia del Valle
Referee:
(Norway) Marcus Wannerstedt
Linesmen:
(Croatia) Krešimir Polašek
(Poland) Wiktor Zień

Geerlings (Tjin-A-Ton, Gerretsen) – 15:45	1–0
Sars (Van Elten, D. Hessels) – 26:37	2–0
Makarin (Sikma) – 30:18	3–0
	3–1	31:58 – Rosales (Dunn)
	3–2	33:32 – Linares (Cruz)
Tjin-A-Ton (Makarin) – 39:51	4–2
Klem (Makarin, Sikma) (PP) – 50:18	5–2
Geerlings (Tjin-A-Ton, De Ruiter) – 50:29	6–2
Sars (Jacobs, D. Hessels) – 55:04	7–2

8 min
Penalties
22 min
42
Shots
17

18 January 2019; 16:30	Serbia	5–0 (4–0, 0–0, 1–0)	Israel	Dom Sportova, Zagreb; Attendance: 65

Game reference

Bojan Dosić
Goalies
Raz Werner
Yehonatan Reisinger
Referee:
(Kazakhstan) Vladimir Yefremov
Linesmen:
(Italy) Nicola Basso
(Croatia) Marko Šaković

Ćurčić (Đumić, Kastel) – 00:10	1–0
Mirkov (Anđelković) – 01:43	2–0
Dragović (Grković) – 10:02	3–0
Popović (Anđelković) – 15:31	4–0
Dragović (Pejčić) – 56:35	5–0

2 min
Penalties
4 min
40
Shots
6

18 January 2019; 20:00	Croatia	5–4 (1–1, 1–1, 3–2)	Belgium	Dom Sportova, Zagreb; Attendance: 1,120

Game reference

Domagoj Troha
Goalies
Cisse Vander Weyde
Referee:
(Germany) Marc Iwert
Linesmen:
(Finland) Joona Elonen
(Italy) Daniel Rigoni

N. Kramirić (Dobrić) – 03:12	1–0
	1–1	11:12 – Huyghe (Versin) (PP)
	1–2	26:33 – De Ceuster (Coolen)
Trstenjak (N. Kramarić) – 30:41	2–2
L. Kramarić – 47:02	3–2
	3–3	47:17 – James (Bogaerts)
Dobrić (Čanić, Selitaj) (PP) – 48:44	4–3
Selitaj (Sutevski) (PP) – 55:37	5–3
	5–4	56:07 – De Ceuster (SH)

8 min
Penalties
14 min
25
Shots
30

19 January 2019; 13:00	Belgium	1–5 (0–0, 0–3, 1–2)	Serbia	Dom Sportova, Zagreb; Attendance: 123

Game reference

Ignace van Noten
Goalies
Jug Mitić
Referee:
(Norway) Marcus Wannerstedt
Linesmen:
(Finland) Joona Elonen
(Croatia) Marko Saković

	0–1	28:13 – Dragović (Subotić, Đumić) (PP)
	0–2	35:42 – Subotić (Đumić, Španjević) (PP2)
	0–3	39:42 – Mladenović (Dragović)
	0–4	47:06 – Kastel (Ćurčić)
	0–5	54:17 – Mašić (Dragović, Kastel) (SH)
Coolen (De Ceuster) (PP) – 54:44	1–5

14 min
Penalties
12 min
31
Shots
45

19 January 2019; 16:30	Israel	3–7 (0–1, 1–4, 2–2)	Netherlands	Dom Sportova, Zagreb; Attendance: 80

Game reference

Yehontan Reisinger
Goalies
Sander Kosters
Referee:
(Slovakia) Vladimír Snášel
Linesmen:
(France) Clement Goncalves
(Croatia) Krešimir Polašek

	0–1	19:24 – Klem (Gerretsen, Sikma)
	0–2	21:33 – Jacobs (D. Hessels, Sars)
	0–3	25:03 – Sikma (Klem, Gerretsen) (PP)
	0–4	28:48 – Tjin-A-Ton (Kleijssen)
	0–5	31:56 – Geerligs (Tjin-A-Ton)
Aharonovich (Vinegrad, Bachinski) (PP) – 38:21	1–5
Halpert (Avraham, Aharonovich) (PP) – 40:53	2–5
	2–6	46:11 – Sars (Van Elten, D. Hessels) (PP)
	2–7	55:15 – Geerligs (Tjin-A-Ton, De Ruiter)
Mostovoy (Halpert) (PP) – 59:53	3–7

18 min
Penalties
20 min
22
Shots
58

19 January 2019; 20:00	Mexico	0–3 (0–1, 0–1, 0–1)	Croatia	Dom Sportova, Zagreb; Attendance: 1,133

Game reference

Sebastian de la Vega
Gerardo Garcia del Valle
Goalies
Domagoj Troha
Referee:
(Germany) Marc Iwert
Linesmen:
(Italy) Daniel Rigoni
(Poland) Wiktor Zień

0–1	01:02 – Paulović (Dobrić, Čanić)
0–2	23:11 – Dobrić (Čanić, Selitaj) (PP)
0–3	47:56 – L. Kramarić (Selitaj, Burazin (EA)

46 min
Penalties
14 min
9
Shots
40

21 January 2019; 13:00	Netherlands	2–6 (1–2, 1–2, 0–2)	Serbia	Dom Sportova, Zagreb; Attendance: 222

Game reference

Sander Kosters
Goalies
Jug Mitić
Referee:
(Germany) Marc Iwert
Linesmen:
(France) Clement Goncalves
(Croatia) Krešimir Polašek

Sars (D. Hessels, Kleijssen) – 06:28	1–0
	1–1	08:45 – Pejčić (Grković)
	1–2	18:25 – Subotić (Đumić) (PP)
	1–3	30:12 – Dragović (Španjević, Subotić) (PP)
	1–4	35:10 – Đumić (PP2)
Klem (Makarin) (PP) – 37:19	2–4
	2–5	46:25 – Subotić (Đumić)
	2–6	51:13 – Đumić (Dragović, Stojsavljević)

24 min
Penalties
10 min
20
Shots
34

21 January 2019; 16:30	Belgium	7–2 (2–2, 0–0, 5–0)	Mexico	Dom Sportova, Zagreb; Attendance: 135

Game reference

Ignace van Noten
Goalies
Gerardo Garcia del Valle
Sebastian de la Vega
Referee:
(Slovakia) Vladimír Snášel
Linesmen:
(Italy) Nicola Basso
(Croatia) Marko Saković

Klijsen (Cuylaerts) (PP) – 09:03	1–0
	1–1	14:55 – Urbano (Cruz) (PP)
	1–2	16:16 – Cruz (Ramos)
De Ceuster (Coolen) – 19:38	2–2
Auger (Versin, Laeremans) (PP) – 50:37	3–2
De Ceuster (Vervoort) (SH) – 51:43	4–2
De Ceuster (Boolen) (SH) – 55:46	5–2
James (Versin) – 57:47	6–2
De Ceuster (Daems) – 58:52	7–2

14 min
Penalties
8 min
36
Shots
13

21 January 2019; 20:00	Croatia	2–1 (1–0, 1–0, 0–1)	Israel	Dom Sportova, Zagreb; Attendance: 678

Game reference

Luka Goršič
Goalies
Raz Werner
Referee:
(Norway) Marcus Wannerstedt
Linesmen:
(Finland) Joona Elonen
(Italy) Daniel Rigoni

Trstenjak (Čanić) (PP) – 17:54	1–0
Selitaj (Čanić, Paulović) (PP) – 24:44	2–0
	2–1	50:48 – Halpert (Avraham) (PP)

8 min
Penalties
8 min
51
Shots
13
