= 2025 IIHF World Championship Division I =

Ice hockey world championships

Tournament details
- Host countries: Romania; Estonia
- Venues: 2 (in 2 host cities)
- Dates: 27 April – 3 May; 26 April – 2 May
- Teams: 12
- Promoted: Great Britain; Italy
- Relegated: Romania; Croatia

The 2025 IIHF World Championship Division I consisted of two international ice hockey tournaments organized by the International Ice Hockey Federation. Divisions I A and I B represent the second and the third tier of the IIHF Ice Hockey World Championships.

In Group A, Great Britain and Italy gained promotion to the Top Division and Romania was relegated. Lithuania won Group B and got promoted, while Croatia was relegated to Division II.

== Group A tournament ==
2025 IIHF World Championship Division I A

Tournament details
- Host country: Romania
- City: Sfântu Gheorghe
- Venue: 1 (in 1 host city)
- Dates: 27 April – 3 May
- Teams: 6

Tournament statistics
- Games played: 15
- Goals scored: 81 (5.4 per game)
- Attendance: 32,181 (2,145 per game)
- Scoring leader: (Ukraine) Andriy Denyskin (9 points)

Official website
- Website

The Division I Group A tournament was played in Sfântu Gheorghe, Romania from 27 April to 3 May 2025.

=== Participants ===
| Team | Qualification |
|---|---|
| Great Britain | Placed 15th in the Elite Division in 2024 and was relegated. |
| Poland | Placed 16th in the Elite Division in 2024 and was relegated. |
| Italy | Placed 3rd in Division I A in 2024. |
| Romania | Host, placed 4th in Division I A in 2024. |
| Japan | Placed 5th in Division I A in 2024. |
| Ukraine | Placed 1st in Division I B in 2024 and was promoted. |

=== Match officials ===
Seven referees and seven linesmen were selected for the tournament.

| Referees | Linesmen |
|---|---|
| (Canada) Jesse Gour; (Canada) Mark Pearce; (Czech Republic) Daniel Pražák; (Finland) Anssi Salonen; (France) Geoffrey Barcelo; (Norway) Markus Wannerstedt; (Sweden) Daniel Eriksson | (Austria) Simon Riecken; (Germany) Kai Jürgens; (Hungary) Norbert Muzsik; (Latvia) Renārs Davidonis; (Slovenia) Gašper Zgonc; (Sweden) Gustav Jönsson; (United States) John Rey |

=== Standings ===
| Pos | Team | Pld | W | OTW | OTL | L | GF | GA | GD | Pts | Promotion or relegation |
|---|---|---|---|---|---|---|---|---|---|---|---|
| 1 | Great Britain | 5 | 2 | 3 | 0 | 0 | 19 | 9 | +10 | 12 | Promoted to the 2026 Top Division |
| 2 | Italy | 5 | 3 | 0 | 1 | 1 | 18 | 11 | +7 | 10 | Promoted to the 2026 Top Division |
| 3 | Ukraine | 5 | 2 | 1 | 1 | 1 | 16 | 10 | +6 | 9 | |
| 4 | Japan | 5 | 2 | 0 | 1 | 2 | 14 | 16 | −2 | 7 | |
| 5 | Poland | 5 | 2 | 0 | 0 | 3 | 8 | 13 | −5 | 6 | |
| 6 | Romania (H) | 5 | 0 | 0 | 1 | 4 | 6 | 22 | −16 | 1 | Relegated to the 2026 Division I B |

Source: IIHF
Rules for classification: 1) points; 2) head-to-head points; 3) head-to-head goal difference; 4) head-to-head number of goals scored; 5) result against closest best-ranked team outside tied teams; 6) result against second-best ranked team outside tied teams; 7) seeding before tournament.
(H) Host

=== Results ===
All times are local (UTC+3)

| 27 April 2025; 12:30 | Japan | 1–4 (0–2, 1–2, 0–0) | Italy | Sepsi Arena, Sfântu Gheorghe; Attendance: 1,960 |

Game reference

Yuta Narisawa
Goalies
Davide Fadani
Referees:
(Canada) Mark Pearce
(Norway) Marcus Wannerstedt
Linesmen:
(Hungary) Norbert Muzsik
(United States) John Rey

| | 0–1 | 02:25 – Purdeller (Pietroniro, Frycklund) (PP) |
| | 0–2 | 07:33 – Ierullo (Misley, Trivellato) |
| | 0–3 | 27:11 – Purdeller (Frycklund, Tedesco) |
| | 0–4 | 36:23 – Tedesco (Purdeller) |
| Hanzawa (T. Nakajima, Kimura) (PP) – 37:53 | 1–4 |

4 min
Penalties
6 min
19
Shots
30

| 27 April 2025; 16:00 | Ukraine | 3–4 GWS (0–1, 2–1, 1–1); OT: (0–0); SO: (0–1) | Great Britain | Sepsi Arena, Sfântu Gheorghe; Attendance: 2,112 |

Game reference

Oleksandr Levshin
Goalies
Ben Bowns
Referees:
(Czech Republic) Daniel Pražák
(Finland) Anssi Salonen
Linesmen:
(Latvia) Renārs Davidonis
(Austria) Simon Riecken

| | 0–1 | 11:08 – Waller (Halbert) |
| | 0–2 | 21:30 – Perlini (O'Connor, Brown) |
| Zakharov (Denyskin) – 25:45 | 1–2 |
| Trakht (Fadyeyev, Peresunko) – 32:01 | 2–2 |
| Boroday (Kupriyanov, Denyskin) – 49:16 | 3–2 |
| | 3–3 | 52:42 – O'Connor (Shudra, Lachowicz) |

Korenchuk (miss)
Trakht (miss)
Vorona (miss)
Peresunko (miss)
Shootout
O'Connor
Lake
(miss) Dowd
2 min
Penalties
6 min
30
Shots
26

| 27 April 2025; 19:30 | Romania | 1–4 (0–1, 1–1, 0–2) | Poland | Sepsi Arena, Sfântu Gheorghe; Attendance: 2,564 |

Game reference

Attila Adorján
Goalies
John Murray
Referees:
(France) Geoffrey Barcelo
(Sweden) Daniel Eriksson
Linesmen:
(Sweden) Gustav Jönsson
(Slovenia) Gašper Zgonc

| | 0–1 | 06:43 – Łyszczarczyk (Bizacki) |
| | 0–2 | 27:52 – Tyczyński (Bryk, Ciura) |
| Gliga (Ferencz-Csibi, Williams) – 34:29 | 1–2 |
| | 1–3 | 54:16 – Krężołek (Tyczyński, Sadlocha) (PP) |
| | 1–4 | 58:11 – Łyszczarczyk (Sadlocha) (PP) |

4 min
Penalties
2 min
13
Shots
38

| 28 April 2025; 12:30 | Italy | 2–3 GWS (0–1, 1–1, 1–0); OT: (0–0); SO: (0–1) | Ukraine | Sepsi Arena, Sfântu Gheorghe; Attendance: 1,274 |

Game reference

Davide Fadani
Goalies
Bogdan Dyachenko
Referees:
(France) Geoffrey Barcelo
(Canada) Jesse Gour
Linesmen:
(Hungary) Norbert Muzsik
(Slovenia) Gašper Zgonc

| | 0–1 | 14:37 – Denyskin (Fadyeyev, Trakht) |
| Di Tomaso (Gazley, Pietroniro) – 32:21 | 1–1 |
| | 1–2 | 38:49 – Zakharov (Denyskin, Sysak) |
| Zanatta (Tedesco, Frycklund) – 44:35 | 2–2 |

Mantenuto (miss)
Gazley (miss)
Purdeller (miss)
Tedesco (miss)
Ierullo (miss)
Shootout
(miss) Denyskin
Peresunko
(miss) Vorona
(miss) Korenchuk
4 min
Penalties
6 min
37
Shots
19

| 28 April 2025; 16:00 | Poland | 2–1 (2–0, 0–0, 0–1) | Japan | Sepsi Arena, Sfântu Gheorghe; Attendance: 1,112 |

Game reference

Tomáš Fučík
Goalies
Issa Otsuka
Referees:
(Czech Republic) Daniel Pražák
(Finland) Anssi Salonen
Linesmen:
(Germany) Kai Jürgens
(Austria) Simon Riecken

| Bizacki (Paś) – 06:27 | 1–0 |
| Krężołek (Paś, Zygmunt) – 19:16 | 2–0 |
| | 2–1 | 59:54 – Osawa (Takagi, Hayata) (PP, EA) |

10 min
Penalties
12 min
31
Shots
28

| 28 April 2025; 19:30 | Great Britain | 2–1 OT (1–1, 0–0, 0–0) (OT: 1–0) | Romania | Sepsi Arena, Sfântu Gheorghe; Attendance: 2,435 |

Game reference

Jackson Whistle
Goalies
Zoltán Tőke
Referees:
(Canada) Mark Pearce
(Norway) Markus Wannerstedt
Linesmen:
(Latvia) Renārs Davidonis
(United States) John Rey

| Waller (Perlini, Neilson) – 00:31 | 1–0 |
| | 1–1 | 09:31 – Gajdó (S. Rokaly) |
| Neilson (Halbert) – 60:36 | 2–1 |

8 min
Penalties
12 min
36
Shots
25

| 30 April 2025; 12:30 | Great Britain | 5–4 OT (1–0, 1–3, 2–1) (OT: 1–0) | Japan | Sepsi Arena, Sfântu Gheorghe; Attendance: 1,345 |

Game reference

Jackson Whistle
Goalies
Yuta Narisawa
Referees:
(France) Geoffrey Barcelo
(Norway) Markus Wannerstedt
Linesmen:
(Latvia) Renārs Davidonis
(Slovenia) Gašper Zgonc

| Dowd (Kirk, Halbert) (EA) – 17:52 | 1–0 |
| Kirk (Perlini, O'Connor) – 24:07 | 2–0 |
| | 2–1 | 25:58 – Isogai (Suzuki) |
| | 2–2 | 29:01 – Okubo (Ishida, Hayata) |
| | 2–3 | 34:16 – Hirano (Takagi, Halliday) |
| Batch (Neilson, Dowd) – 48:41 | 3–3 |
| | 3–4 | 50:39 – Takagi (Kimura, Isogai) |
| O'Connor (Kirk, Lake) – 58:11 | 4–4 |
| Dowd (Halbert) – 60:41 | 5–4 |

4 min
Penalties
0 min
36
Shots
34

| 30 April 2025; 16:00 | Poland | 1–4 (1–0, 0–2, 0–2) | Italy | Sepsi Arena, Sfântu Gheorghe; Attendance: 2,325 |

Game reference

Tomáš Fučík
Goalies
Davide Fadani
Referees:
(Canada) Jesse Gour
(Canada) Mark Pearce
Linesmen:
(Sweden) Gustav Jönsson
(Austria) Simon Riecken

| Paś (Zygmunt, Bizacki) – 14:51 | 1–0 |
| | 1–1 | 22:37 – Mantenuto (Seed, Tedesco) |
| | 1–2 | 34:59 – Pietroniro (Di Tomaso, Gazley) (PP) |
| | 1–3 | 48:09 – Zanetti (Trivellato) |
| | 1–4 | 59:19 – Tedesco (PS) |

8 min
Penalties
6 min
21
Shots
24

| 30 April 2025; 19:30 | Ukraine | 4–0 (3–0, 1–0, 0–0) | Romania | Sepsi Arena, Sfântu Gheorghe; Attendance: 2,455 |

Game reference

Bogdan Dyachenko
Goalies
Zoltán Tőke
Attila Adorján
Referees:
(Sweden) Daniel Eriksson
(Czech Republic) Daniel Pražák
Linesmen:
(Germany) Kai Jürgens
(United States) John Rey

| Zakharov (Denyskin, Borodai) – 04:10 | 1–0 |
| Lialka – 05:44 | 2–0 |
| Denyskin (Zakharov) – 08:58 | 3–0 |
| Denyskin (Borodai, Ratushny) – 37:14 | 4–0 |

10 min
Penalties
10 min
26
Shots
22

| 1 May 2025; 12:30 | Italy | 1–5 (0–2, 1–2, 0–1) | Great Britain | Sepsi Arena, Sfântu Gheorghe; Attendance: 2,378 |

Game reference

Davide Fadani
Damian Clara
Goalies
Ben Bowns
Referees:
(Sweden) Daniel Eriksson
(Finland) Anssi Salonen
Linesmen:
(Sweden) Gustav Jönsson
(Hungary) Norbert Muzsik

| | 0–1 | 00:32 – Kirk (Lake, Perlini) |
| | 0–2 | 17:22 – Halbert (Kirk, Perlini) |
| | 0–3 | 20:42 – Kirk (Perlini) |
| | 0–4 | 27:03 – Duggan (Shudra) |
| Misley (Di Tomaso, Seed) – 30:43 | 1–4 |
| | 1–5 | 58:45 – O'Connor (Dowd, Kirk) (PP2) |

8 min
Penalties
8 min
33
Shots
17

| 1 May 2025; 16:00 | Poland | 1–4 (0–0, 1–1, 0–3) | Ukraine | Sepsi Arena, Sfântu Gheorghe; Attendance: 2,355 |

Game reference

John Murray
Goalies
Bogdan Dyachenko
Referees:
(Canada) Mark Pearce
(Norway) Markus Wannerstedt
Linesmen:
(Latvia) Renārs Davidonis
(Slovenia) Gašper Zgonc

| Łyszczarczyk (Sadlocha, Dziubiński) (PP) – 25:28 | 1–0 |
| | 1–1 | 32:23 – Zakharov (Denyskin, Sysak) |
| | 1–2 | 43:08 – Zakharov (Borodai, Denyskin) |
| | 1–3 | 50:16 – Sadovikov (Korenchuk) |
| | 1–4 | 55:00 – Trakht (Peresunko) |

4 min
Penalties
4 min
27
Shots
21

| 1 May 2025; 19:30 | Romania | 3–5 (0–4, 3–1, 0–0) | Japan | Sepsi Arena, Sfântu Gheorghe; Attendance: 2,460 |

Game reference

Attila Adorján
Zoltán Tőke
Goalies
Issa Otsuka
Referees:
(France) Geoffrey Barcelo
(Canada) Jesse Gour
Linesmen:
(Germany) Kai Jürgens
(Austria) Simon Riecken

| | 0–1 | 01:01 – T. Nakajima (Y. Satō, Ishida) |
| | 0–2 | 05:47 – Suzuki (H. Satō, Irikura) |
| | 0–3 | 11:37 – Osawa (Hirano, H. Satō) (PP) |
| | 0–4 | 18:46 – Y. Satō (T. Nakajima, Hanzawa) |
| Valchař – 26:15 | 1–4 |
| | 1–5 | 34:09 – Hirano |
| Skachkov (Filip, Gliga) – 35:04 | 2–5 |
| S. Rokaly (Péter, Részegh) (PP) – 39:31 | 3–5 |

8 min
Penalties
2 min
17
Shots
36

| 3 May 2025; 12:30 | Japan | 3–2 (1–1, 2–0, 0–1) | Ukraine | Sepsi Arena, Sfântu Gheorghe; Attendance: 2,246 |

Game reference

Issa Otsuka
Goalies
Alexander Levshin
Referees:
(Sweden) Daniel Eriksson
(Norway) Markus Wannerstedt
Linesmen:
(Sweden) Gustav Jönsson
(United States) John Rey

| | 0–1 | 04:58 – Zakharov |
| T. Nakajima – 13:22 | 1–1 |
| Irikura (Kimura, Hanzawa) (PP) – 29:38 | 2–1 |
| Suzuki (Isogai) – 30:31 | 3–1 |
| | 3–2 | 49:40 – Vorona (Zakharov) |

14 min
Penalties
4 min
23
Shots
30

| 3 May 2025; 16:00 | Italy | 7–1 (3–1, 3–0, 1–0) | Romania | Sepsi Arena, Sfântu Gheorghe; Attendance: 2,273 |

Game reference

Davide Fadani
Goalies
Zoltán Tőke
Attila Adorján
Referees:
(Canada) Jesse Gour
(Finland) Anssi Salonen
Linesmen:
(Hungary) Norbert Muzsik
(Slovenia) Gašper Zgonc

| Frigo (Gazley) – 02:50 | 1–0 |
| Tedesco (Purdeller, Saracino) – 04:12 | 2–0 |
| | 2–1 | 14:39 – Valchař (Gliga, Williams) (SH) |
| Mantenuto (Saracino, Purdeller) – 15:31 | 3–1 |
| Misley (Ierullo, Saracino) – 32:00 | 4–1 |
| Zanatta (Gazley, Tedesco) – 36:01 | 5–1 |
| Tedesco (Misley) (PP) – 39:24 | 6–1 |
| Zanetti (Pietroniro, Zanatta) – 44:46 | 7–1 |

6 min
Penalties
8 min
32
Shots
16

| 3 May 2025; 19:30 | Great Britain | 3–0 (1–0, 2–0, 0–0) | Poland | Sepsi Arena, Sfântu Gheorghe; Attendance: 2,367 |

Game reference

Ben Bowns
Goalies
Tomáš Fučík
Referees:
(Canada) Mark Pearce
(Czech Republic) Daniel Pražák
Linesmen:
(Germany) Kai Jürgens
(Austria) Simon Riecken

| Waller (Dowd, Tetlow) – 17:01 | 1–0 |
| Dowd (Hazeldine) – 28:20 | 2–0 |
| Betteridge (Waller, Bowns) (PP) – 35:22 | 3–0 |

4 min
Penalties
4 min
31
Shots
40

=== Statistics ===
==== Scoring leaders ====
List shows the top skaters sorted by points, then goals.

| Player | GP | G | A | Pts | +/− | PIM | POS |
|---|---|---|---|---|---|---|---|
| (Ukraine) Andriy Denyskin | 5 | 3 | 6 | 9 | +8 | 6 | F |
| (Ukraine) Viktor Zakharov | 5 | 6 | 2 | 8 | +8 | 0 | F |
| (Italy) Daniel Tedesco | 5 | 4 | 4 | 8 | +3 | 2 | F |
| (United Kingdom) Liam Kirk | 3 | 3 | 4 | 7 | +5 | 0 | F |
| (United Kingdom) Robert Dowd | 5 | 3 | 3 | 6 | +4 | 6 | F |
| (United Kingdom) Brett Perlini | 5 | 1 | 5 | 6 | +4 | 0 | F |
| (United Kingdom) Ben O'Connor | 5 | 3 | 2 | 5 | +2 | 4 | D |
| (Italy) Tommy Purdeller | 5 | 2 | 3 | 5 | 0 | 2 | F |
| (United Kingdom) Nathanael Halbert | 5 | 1 | 4 | 5 | +3 | 0 | D |
| (United Kingdom) Josh Waller | 5 | 3 | 1 | 4 | +2 | 2 | F |

GP = Games played; G = Goals; A = Assists; Pts = Points; +/− = Plus/Minus; PIM = Penalties in Minutes; POS = Position
Source: IIHF.com

==== Goaltending leaders ====
Only the top five goaltenders, based on save percentage, who have played at least 40% of their team's minutes, are included in this list.

| Player | TOI | GA | GAA | SA | Sv% | SO |
|---|---|---|---|---|---|---|
| (Ukraine) Bogdan Dyachenko | 185:00 | 3 | 0.97 | 86 | 96.51 | 1 |
| (United Kingdom) Ben Bowns | 185:00 | 4 | 1.30 | 103 | 96.12 | 1 |
| (Japan) Issa Otsuka | 176:55 | 7 | 2.37 | 78 | 91.03 | 0 |
| (Poland) Tomáš Fučík | 180:00 | 8 | 2.67 | 83 | 90.36 | 0 |
| (Italy) Davide Fadani | 265:42 | 8 | 1.81 | 80 | 90.00 | 0 |

TOI = time on ice (minutes:seconds); SA = shots against; GA = goals against; GAA = goals against average; Sv% = save percentage; SO = shutouts
Source: IIHF.com

=== Awards ===
| Position | Player |
|---|---|
| Goaltender | (Ukraine) Bogdan Dyachenko |
| Defenceman | (Italy) Luca Zanatta |
| Forward | (United Kingdom) Liam Kirk |

== Group B tournament ==
2025 IIHF World Championship Division I B

Tournament details
- Host country: Estonia
- City: Tallinn
- Venue: 1 (in 1 host city)
- Dates: 26 April – 2 May
- Teams: 6

Tournament statistics
- Games played: 15
- Goals scored: 81 (5.4 per game)
- Attendance: 15,081 (1,005 per game)
- Scoring leader: (South Korea) Kim Sang-wook (8 points)

Official website
- Website

The Division I Group B tournament was played in Tallinn, Estonia from 26 April to 2 May 2025.

=== Participants ===
| Team | Qualification |
|---|---|
| South Korea | Placed 6th in Division I A in 2024 and was relegated. |
| Lithuania | Placed 2nd in Division I B in 2024. |
| Estonia | Host, placed 3rd in Division I B in 2024. |
| China | Placed 4th in Division I B in 2024. |
| Spain | Placed 5th in Division I B in 2024. |
| Croatia | Placed 1st in Division II A in 2024 and was promoted. |

=== Match officials ===
Seven referees and seven linesmen were selected for the tournament.

| Referees | Linesmen |
|---|---|
| (France) Nicolas Crégut; (Germany) Lukas Kohlmüller; (Hungary) Attila Nagy; (Poland) Michał Baca; (Sweden) Andreas Harnebring; (Sweden) Alexander Österberg; (United States) Nolan Bloyer | (Estonia) Savva Azarov; (Hungary) David Szabó; (Italy) Davide Mantovani; (South Korea) Lim Jun-seo; (Poland) Michał Gerne; (Switzerland) Michael Stalder; (Slovakia) Daniel Konc |

=== Standings ===
| Pos | Team | Pld | W | OTW | OTL | L | GF | GA | GD | Pts | Promotion or relegation |
|---|---|---|---|---|---|---|---|---|---|---|---|
| 1 | Lithuania | 5 | 4 | 1 | 0 | 0 | 14 | 3 | +11 | 14 | Promoted to the 2026 Division I A |
| 2 | South Korea | 5 | 4 | 0 | 0 | 1 | 21 | 11 | +10 | 12 | |
| 3 | Estonia (H) | 5 | 3 | 0 | 0 | 2 | 19 | 9 | +10 | 9 | |
| 4 | China | 5 | 1 | 1 | 0 | 3 | 9 | 14 | −5 | 5 | |
| 5 | Spain | 5 | 0 | 1 | 1 | 3 | 9 | 25 | −16 | 3 | |
| 6 | Croatia | 5 | 0 | 0 | 2 | 3 | 9 | 19 | −10 | 2 | Relegated to the 2026 Division II A |

Source: IIHF
Rules for classification: 1) points; 2) head-to-head points; 3) head-to-head goal difference; 4) head-to-head number of goals scored; 5) result against closest best-ranked team outside tied teams; 6) result against second-best ranked team outside tied teams; 7) seeding before tournament.
(H) Host

=== Results ===
All times are local (UTC+3)

| 26 April 2025; 12:30 | China | 0–1 (0–0, 0–1, 0–0) | Lithuania | Tondiraba Ice Hall, Tallinn; Attendance: 181 |

Game reference
| Chen Shifeng | Goalies | Laurynas Lubys | Referees: (United States) Nolan Bloyer (Sweden) Alexander Österberg; Linesmen: (Poland) Michał Gerne (South Korea) Lim Jun-seo |
| 0–1 / 22:24 – Kaleinikovas (Grinius, Noreika) (PP) | | | Referees: (United States) Nolan Bloyer (Sweden) Alexander Österberg; Linesmen: (Poland) Michał Gerne (South Korea) Lim Jun-seo |
| 10 min | Penalties | 10 min | Referees: (United States) Nolan Bloyer (Sweden) Alexander Österberg; Linesmen: (Poland) Michał Gerne (South Korea) Lim Jun-seo |
| 18 | Shots | 36 | Referees: (United States) Nolan Bloyer (Sweden) Alexander Österberg; Linesmen: (Poland) Michał Gerne (South Korea) Lim Jun-seo |

| 26 April 2025; 16:00 | Spain | 1–6 (0–1, 0–0, 1–5) | Estonia | Tondiraba Ice Hall, Tallinn; Attendance: 2,135 |

Game reference

Raúl Barbo
Goalies
Conrad Mölder
Referees:
(Sweden) Andreas Harnebring
(Germany) Lukas Kohlmüller
Linesmen:
(Slovakia) Daniel Konc
(Italy) Davide Mantovani

| | 0–1 | 08:13 – Burkov (Timofejev, Rooba) (PP) |
| | 0–2 | 41:48 – Timofejev (Rooba, Burkov) (PP) |
| Rubio (Fernández, P. Cerda) – 45:23 | 1–2 |
| | 1–3 | 47:54 – Arrak (Viitanen) |
| | 1–4 | 48:09 – M. Potsinok (E. Potsinok, Novikov) |
| | 1–5 | 52:29 – Arrak (Slessarevski, Viitanen) (PP) |
| | 1–6 | 59:17 – Burkov (Rooba, Timofejev) |

10 min
Penalties
4 min
24
Shots
37

| 26 April 2025; 19:30 | Croatia | 2–5 (1–0, 0–2, 1–3) | South Korea | Tondiraba Ice Hall, Tallinn; Attendance: 165 |

Game reference

Vilim Rosandić
Goalies
Ha Jung-ho
Referees:
(France) Nicolas Crégut
(Hungary) Attila Nagy
Linesmen:
(Estonia) Savva Azarov
(Switzerland) Michael Stalder

| Marinković (Idžan, Rendulić) – 08:54 | 1–0 |
| | 1–1 | 22:29 – Lee Y. |
| | 1–2 | 34:18 – Nam (Ahn, Kim S-w.) |
| Dobrić (Zavrski, Malenica) – 51:43 | 2–2 |
| | 2–3 | 56:01 – Kim G. (Kim Sang-y., Chung) |
| | 2–4 | 57:26 – Lee M. (Kim Sang-w.) |
| | 2–5 | 59:16 – Kim Sang-w. (Lee C., Kang Y.) (EN) |

6 min
Penalties
0 min
10
Shots
55

| 27 April 2025; 12:30 | Lithuania | 5–0 (2–0, 3–0, 0–0) | Spain | Tondiraba Ice Hall, Tallinn; Attendance: 315 |

Game reference

Laurynas Lubys
Goalies
Marco Hernández
Raúl Barbo
Referees:
(Germany) Lukas Kohlmüller
(Sweden) Alexander Österberg
Linesmen:
(Switzerland) Michael Stalder
(Hungary) David Śzabo

| Dėdinas (Grinius) – 14:29 | 1–0 |
| Noreika – 14:56 | 2–0 |
| Ališauskas (Čižas, Bendžius) (PP) – 22:03 | 3–0 |
| Krakauskas (Dėdinas, Ališauskas) – 24:55 | 4–0 |
| Grinius (Četvertak, Noreika) (PP) – 32:46 | 5–0 |

6 min
Penalties
35 min
25
Shots
21

| 27 April 2025; 16:00 | Estonia | 6–2 (3–0, 2–2, 1–0) | Croatia | Tondiraba Ice Hall, Tallinn; Attendance: 1,935 |

Game reference

Villem-Henrik Koitmaa
Goalies
Vilim Rosandić
Vito Nikolić
Referees:
(Poland) Michał Baca
(United States) Nolan Bloyer
Linesmen:
(Poland) Michał Gerne
(South Korea) Lim Jun-seo

| Timofejev (Rooba) – 01:01 | 1–0 |
| Arrak (Kudeviita) – 11:45 | 2–0 |
| Rooba (Kulintsev, Burkov) (PP) – 18:47 | 3–0 |
| Jürgens (M. Potsinok, E. Potsinok) – 31:18 | 4–0 |
| Viitanen (Arrak, Kulintsev) – 34:00 | 5–0 |
| | 5–1 | 35:05 – Marinković (Malenica, Rendulić) (PP) |
| | 5–2 | 37:31 – Malenica (Idžan, Marinković) (PP) |
| Jürgens (Viitanen, Arrak) – 53:27 | 6–2 |

8 min
Penalties
2 min
36
Shots
25

| 27 April 2025; 19:30 | South Korea | 2–1 (0–0, 2–1, 0–0) | China | Tondiraba Ice Hall, Tallinn; Attendance: 155 |

Game reference

Ha Jung-ho
Goalies
Chen Shifeng
Referees:
(France) Nicolas Crégut
(Sweden) Andreas Harnebring
Linesmen:
(Slovakia) Daniel Konc
(Italy) Davide Mantovani

| | 0–1 | 21:50 – Wang (Yu) |
| Kim S-w. (Lee. S, Kang Y.) – 26:38 | 1–1 |
| Kim S-w. (Shin, Kang Y.) – 38:29 | 2–1 |

8 min
Penalties
4 min
44
Shots
21

| 29 April 2025; 12:30 | South Korea | 9–3 (4–0, 4–1, 1–2) | Spain | Tondiraba Ice Hall, Tallinn; Attendance: 251 |

Game reference

Ha Jung-ho
Goalies
Raúl Barbo
Marco Hernández
Referees:
(Poland) Michał Baca
(Sweden) Alexander Österberg
Linesmen:
(Estonia) Savva Azarov
(Slovakia) Daniel Konc

| Kim Si. (Oh) – 10:02 | 1–0 |
| Lee C. (Hong, Ahn) – 12:50 | 2–0 |
| Kang Y. (Lee C., Kim Sang-w.) (PP) – 14:26 | 3–0 |
| Ahn (Nam) – 14:48 | 4–0 |
| Kim W. (Ahn, Kang M.) – 24:22 | 5–0 |
| | 5–1 | 26:00 – Capillas |
| Kang M. (Lee Y., Oh) – 27:43 | 6–1 |
| Lee C. (Kim G.) (SH) – 33:55 | 7–1 |
| Hong (Chung) – 36:52 | 8–1 |
| | 8–2 | 40:52 – Rubio (Collado, Capillas) |
| Kim Sang-y. (Lee. S, Ahn) (PP) – 57:38 | 9–2 |
| | 9–3 | 58:50 – Carbonell (Cerdà) |

2 min
Penalties
4 min
32
Shots
18

| 29 April 2025; 16:00 | Croatia | 3–4 (0–1, 1–1, 2–2) | China | Tondiraba Ice Hall, Tallinn; Attendance: 135 |

Game reference

Vilim Rosandić
Goalies
Chen Shifeng
Referees:
(Germany) Lukas Kohlmüller
(Hungary) Attila Nagy
Linesmen:
(Poland) Michał Gerne
(Hungary) David Szabó

| | 0–1 | 10:55 – Hou (Xu, Yu) |
| | 0–2 | 20:33 – Hou (Yu, Wang) |
| Rendulić (Dobrić, Marinković) – 26:47 | 1–2 |
| Idžan (Rendulić) – 40:26 | 2–2 |
| | 2–3 | 41:08 – Yan J. (Zhang Z., Guo Z.) |
| Malenica (Rendulić, Janković) (EA) – 59:03 | 3–3 |
| | 3–4 | 59:30 – Yan J. (Guo J., Han) |

2 min
Penalties
8 min
36
Shots
33

| 29 April 2025; 19:30 | Lithuania | 2–1 (0–0, 2–0, 0–1) | Estonia | Tondiraba Ice Hall, Tallinn; Attendance: 3,045 |

Game reference

Laurynas Lubys
Goalies
Conrad Mölder
Villem-Henrik Koitmaa
Referees:
(United States) Nolan Bloyer
(France) Nicolas Crégut
Linesmen:
(Italy) Davide Mantovani
(Switzerland) Michael Stalder

| Valivonis (Dėdinas, Krakauskas) – 25:11 | 1–0 |
| Gintautas (Čižas, Kaleinikovas) (PP) – 32:43 | 2–0 |
| | 2–1 | 49:57 – Nevolainen (Puzakov, Vasjonkin) |

6 min
Penalties
4 min
13
Shots
36

| 1 May 2025; 12:30 | Lithuania | 2–1 OT (0–0, 1–0, 0–1) (OT: 1–0) | Croatia | Tondiraba Ice Hall, Tallinn; Attendance: 335 |

Game reference

Laurynas Lubys
Goalies
Vito Nikolić
Referees:
(Poland) Michał Baca
(France) Nicolas Crégut
Linesmen:
(Estonia) Savva Azarov
(Hungary) David Szabó

| Kaleinikovas (Čižas, Gintautas) – 30:16 | 1–0 |
| | 1–1 | 43:47 – Rendulić (Marinković, Brenčun) |
| Čižas (Ališauskas, Kaleinikovas) – 63:21 | 2–1 |

6 min
Penalties
4 min
53
Shots
19

| 1 May 2025; 16:00 | Estonia | 1–4 (1–2, 0–1, 0–1) | South Korea | Tondiraba Ice Hall, Tallinn; Attendance: 2,577 |

Game reference

Villem-Henrik Koitmaa
Goalies
Ha Jung-ho
Referees:
(United States) Nolan Bloyer
(Sweden) Alexander Österberg
Linesmen:
(Slovakia) Daniel Konc
(Italy) Davide Mantovani

| Jürgens (M. Potsinok, Vasjonkin) – 01:35 | 1–0 |
| | 1–1 | 08:02 – Kim Sang-y. (Kim Si., Kim G.) |
| | 1–2 | 14:27 – Lee C. (Hong) |
| | 1–3 | 36:40 – Kang Y. (Kim S-w., Shin) |
| | 1–4 | 46:53 – Kong (Shin) |

0 min
Penalties
4 min
24
Shots
20

| 1 May 2025; 19:30 | China | 4–3 GWS (1–0, 2–1, 1–2); OT: (0–0); SO: (1–0) | Spain | Tondiraba Ice Hall, Tallinn; Attendance: 315 |

Game reference

Chen Shifeng
Goalies
Raúl Barbo
Referees:
(Sweden) Andreas Harnebring
(Hungary) Attila Nagy
Linesmen:
(South Korea) Lim Jun-seo
(Switzerland) Michael Stalder

| Zhang Z. (Hou, Xu) (PP) – 19:38 | 1–0 |
| Xu (Zhang P., Hou) (PP) – 23:14 | 2–0 |
| Yan J. (Zhang Z., Xu) (PP) – 28:56 | 3–0 |
| | 3–1 | 38:14 – González (De Bonilla, Rubio) (PP) |
| | 3–2 | 42:16 – Rubio (Carbonell, González) |
| | 3–3 | 53:55 – Capillas (Donath, Burgos) (PP) |

Zhang Z. (miss)
Wang (miss)
Zhang P. (miss)
Yan J. (miss)
Hou
Hou
Shootout
(miss) González
Capillas
(miss) Carbonell
(miss) Cerdà
(miss) Donath
(miss) Capillas
8 min
Penalties
16 min
35
Shots
29

| 2 May 2025; 12:30 | South Korea | 1–4 (0–1, 0–2, 1–1) | Lithuania | Tondiraba Ice Hall, Tallinn; Attendance: 412 |

Game reference

Ha Jung-ho
Goalies
Laurynas Lubys
Referees:
(United States) Nolan Bloyer
(Sweden) Alexander Österberg
Linesmen:
(Slovakia) Daniel Konc
(Italy) Davide Mantovani

| | 0–1 | 12:51 – Bendžius (Četvertak) |
| | 0–2 | 27:51 – Kaleinikovas (Ališauskas, Čižas) (PP) |
| | 0–3 | 38:11 – Gintautas (Ališauskas, Kaleinikovas) |
| | 0–4 | 48:37 – Kaleinikovas (Ališauskas, Čižas) (PP) |
| Kang Y. (Kim S-w., Shin) – 56:24 | 1–4 |

8 min
Penalties
4 min
28
Shots
24

| 2 May 2025; 16:00 | Spain | 2–1 OT (1–1, 0–0, 0–0) (OT: 1–0) | Croatia | Tondiraba Ice Hall, Tallinn; Attendance: 255 |

Game reference

Raúl Barbo
Goalies
Vilim Rosandić
Referees:
(Sweden) Andreas Harnebring
(Germany) Lukas Kohlmüller
Linesmen:
(Poland) Michał Gerne
(Switzerland) Michael Stalder

| | 0–1 | 00:37 – Rendulić (Marinković, Idžan) |
| Capillas (Rubio) – 17:35 | 1–1 |
| Capillas – 64:05 | 2–1 |

4 min
Penalties
8 min
37
Shots
21

| 2 May 2025; 19:30 | Estonia | 5–0 (1–0, 2–0, 2–0) | China | Tondiraba Ice Hall, Tallinn; Attendance: 2,870 |

Game reference

Villem-Henrik Koitmaa
Goalies
Chen Shifeng
Referees:
(Poland) Michał Baca
(France) Nicolas Crégut
Linesmen:
(South Korea) Lim Jun-seo
(Hungary) David Szabó

| M. Potsinok (Jürgens, E. Potsinok) – 07:16 | 1–0 |
| Jürgens (Rooba, Timofejev) (PP) – 33:52 | 2–0 |
| Timofejev (Rooba, Kulintsev) – 37:55 | 3–0 |
| E. Potsinok (Jürgens, Vasjonkin) – 41:26 | 4–0 |
| Burkov (Kulintsev, Ossipov) – 47:22 | 5–0 |

4 min
Penalties
8 min
48
Shots
13

=== Statistics ===
==== Scoring leaders ====
List shows the top skaters sorted by points, then goals.

| Player | GP | G | A | Pts | +/− | PIM | POS |
|---|---|---|---|---|---|---|---|
| (South Korea) Kim Sang-wook | 5 | 3 | 5 | 8 | +6 | 2 | F |
| (Lithuania) Mark Kaleinikovas | 5 | 4 | 3 | 7 | +1 | 2 | F |
| (Croatia) Borna Rendulić | 5 | 3 | 4 | 7 | +1 | 0 | F |
| (Lithuania) Ugnius Čižas | 5 | 1 | 6 | 7 | +1 | 4 | F |
| (Estonia) Robert Rooba | 5 | 1 | 6 | 7 | +4 | 0 | F |
| (Estonia) Morten Jürgens | 5 | 4 | 2 | 6 | +5 | 0 | F |
| (South Korea) Kang Yoon-seok | 5 | 3 | 3 | 6 | +8 | 2 | F |
| (Estonia) David Timofejev | 5 | 3 | 3 | 6 | +4 | 0 | F |
| (Croatia) Karlo Marinković | 5 | 2 | 4 | 6 | −1 | 0 | F |
| (Lithuania) Nerijus Ališauskas | 5 | 1 | 5 | 6 | +4 | 4 | D |

GP = Games played; G = Goals; A = Assists; Pts = Points; +/− = Plus/Minus; PIM = Penalties in Minutes; POS = Position
Source: IIHF.com

==== Goaltending leaders ====
Only the top five goaltenders, based on save percentage, who have played at least 40% of their team's minutes, are included in this list.

| Player | TOI | GA | GAA | SA | Sv% | SO |
|---|---|---|---|---|---|---|
| (Lithuania) Laurynas Lubys | 298:04 | 3 | 0.60 | 119 | 97.48 | 1 |
| (China) Chen Shifeng | 303:01 | 14 | 2.77 | 193 | 92.75 | 0 |
| (Croatia) Vilim Rosandić | 202:41 | 13 | 3.85 | 139 | 90.65 | 0 |
| (South Korea) Ha Jung-ho | 300:00 | 11 | 2.20 | 97 | 88.66 | 0 |
| (Estonia) Villem-Henrik Koitmaa | 235:35 | 8 | 2.04 | 70 | 88.57 | 1 |

TOI = time on ice (minutes:seconds); SA = shots against; GA = goals against; GAA = goals against average; Sv% = save percentage; SO = shutouts
Source: IIHF.com

=== Awards ===
| Position | Player |
|---|---|
| Goaltender | (Lithuania) Laurynas Lubys |
| Defenceman | (Lithuania) Nerijus Ališauskas |
| Forward | (South Korea) Kim Sang-wook |
