= Laurynas Lubys =

Lithuanian ice hockey player (born 2000)

- Born: 6 December 2000 (age 25) Klaipėda, Lithuania
- Height: 5 ft 10 in (178 cm)
- Weight: 176 lb (80 kg; 12 st 8 lb)
- Position: Goaltender
- Catches: Left
- OHL team Former teams: Energija/GV Elektrėnai; HK Liepāja; IF Vallentuna BK; Furuset Ishockey; Lørenskog IK; Hasle-Løren IL
- National team: Lithuania
- NHL draft: Undrafted
- Playing career: 2018–present

Laurynas Lubys (born 6 December 2000) is a Lithuanian ice hockey goaltender.

Lubys made his Hockeyettan debut playing with IF Vallentuna BK during the 2021–22 Hockeyettan season.

== Career statistics ==
=== Regular season and playoffs ===
			Regular season									Playoffs
Season	Team	League	GP	W	L	T/OT	MIN	GA	SO	GAA	SV%	GP	W	L	MIN	GA	SO	GAA	SV%
2018–19	SaiPa U20	U20 SM-liiga	17	—	—	—	—	—	—	—	.889	—	—	—	—	—	—	—	—
2019–20	SaiPa U20	U20 SM-liiga	12	—	—	—	—	—	—	—	.885	—	—	—	—	—	—	—	—
2020-21	HK Liepāja	Latvia	3	2	1	0	179	8	1	2.67	.918	—	—	—	—	—	—	—	—
2021–22	IF Vallentuna BK	Hockeyettan	1	0	1	0	63	4	0	3.76	.852	—	—	—	—	—	—	—	—
2021–22	Furuset Ishockey U21 2	Norway U21	1	2	0	0	0	1	0	1.00	.963	—	—	—	—	—	—	—	—
2021–22	Furuset Ishockey	Norway2	2	0	2	0	0	11	0	5.59	.872	—	—	—	—	—	—	—	—
2022–23	Lørenskog IK	Norway2	4	3	1	0	—	9	0	2.29	.927	—	—	—	—	—	—	—	—
2022-23	Hasle-Løren IL	Norway2	8	3	5	0	—	38	0	4.81	.883	—	—	—	—	—	—	—	—
2023–24	Hasle-Løren IL	Norway2	28	4	22	0	—	114	0	4.08	.895	—	—	—	—	—	—	—	—
2024–25	Hasle-Løren IL	Norway2	28	4	21	0	1559	147	1	5.26	.868	—	—	—	—	—	—	—	—
2025-26	Energija/GV Elektrėnai	Latvia	25	—	—	—	1397	81	0	3.26	.912	—	—	—	—	—	—	—	—

=== International ===
Junior – U18

Year	Team	Event	Result	GP	W	L	OT	MIN	GA	SO	GAA	SV%
2018	Lithuania	WJC18 D2A	2nd	4	3	1	0	240	7	1	1.75	.947
U18 totals				4	3	1	0	240	7	1	1.75	.947

Junior – U20

Year	Team	Event	Result	GP	W	L	OT	MIN	GA	SO	GAA	SV%
2018	Lithuania	WJC20 D1B	6th	5	0	2	0	185	6	0	1.29	.953
2019	Lithuania	WJC20 D2A	2nd	5	3	1	0	309	10	1	2.13	.938
2020	Lithuania	WJC20 D2A	3rd	5	2	1	0	197	16	0	3.35	.869
U20 totals				15	5	4	0	691	32	1	2.26	.920

Senior

Year	Team	Event	Result	GP	W	L	OT	MIN	GA	SO	GAA	SV%
2019	Lithuania	WC D1A	6th	2	0	1	0	79	9	0	4.51	.882
2020	Lithuania	OGQ	NQ	3	1	2	0	160	13	0	4.50	.870
2025	Lithuania	WC D1B	1st	5	5	0	0	298	3	1	0.60	.975
2026	Lithuania	WC D1A	5th	1	0	1	0	60	2	0	2.00	.943
Senior totals				11	6	4	0	597	27	1	2.90	.918
