= 2020 World Junior Ice Hockey Championships – Division II =

International ice hockey tournament

2020 IIHF U20 World Championship Division II
Tournament details
- Host countries: Lithuania; South Korea
- Venues: 2 (in 2 host cities)
- Dates: 6–12 January 2020; 28 January – 3 February 2020
- Teams: 12

The 2020 World Junior Ice Hockey Championship Division II consisted of two tiered groups of six teams each: the fourth-tier Division II A and the fifth-tier Division II B. For each tier's tournament, the first-placed team was promoted to a higher division, while the last-placed team was relegated to a lower division.

To be eligible as a junior player in these tournaments, a player couldn't be born earlier than 2000.

== Division II A ==
2020 IIHF U20 World Championship Division II A

Tournament details
- Host country: Lithuania
- City: Vilnius
- Venue: 1 (in 1 host city)
- Dates: 6–12 January 2020
- Teams: 6

Tournament statistics
- Games played: 15
- Goals scored: 114 (7.6 per game)
- Attendance: 7,303 (487 per game)
- Scoring leader: (Japan) Teruto Nakajima (13 points)

Official website
- www.iihf.com

The Division II A tournament was played in Vilnius, Lithuania, from 6 to 12 January 2020.

=== Participating teams ===
Team	Qualification
Japan	Placed 6th in Division I B last year and were relegated.
Lithuania	Hosts; placed 2nd in Division II A last year.
Great Britain	Placed 3rd in Division II A last year.
Romania	Placed 4th in Division II A last year.
Spain	Placed 5th in Division II A last year.
Serbia	Placed 1st in Division II B last year and were promoted.

=== Match officials ===
Four referees and 7 linesmen were selected for the tournament.

Referees

- (Belgium) Niki De Herdt
- (Denmark) Niclas Lundsgaard
- (Slovenia) Tilen Pahor
- (Italy) Turo Virta

Linesmen

- (France) Joris Barcelo
- (Lithuania) Karolis Janušauskas
- (Norway) Herman Johansen
- (Hungary) Norbert Muzsik
- (Lithuania) Laurynas Stepankevičius
- (Russia) Nikita Vilyugin
- (Latvia) Dāvis Zunde

=== Final standings ===
Division II A Venue
Vilnius
Pramogu-Arena
Capacity: 2,500
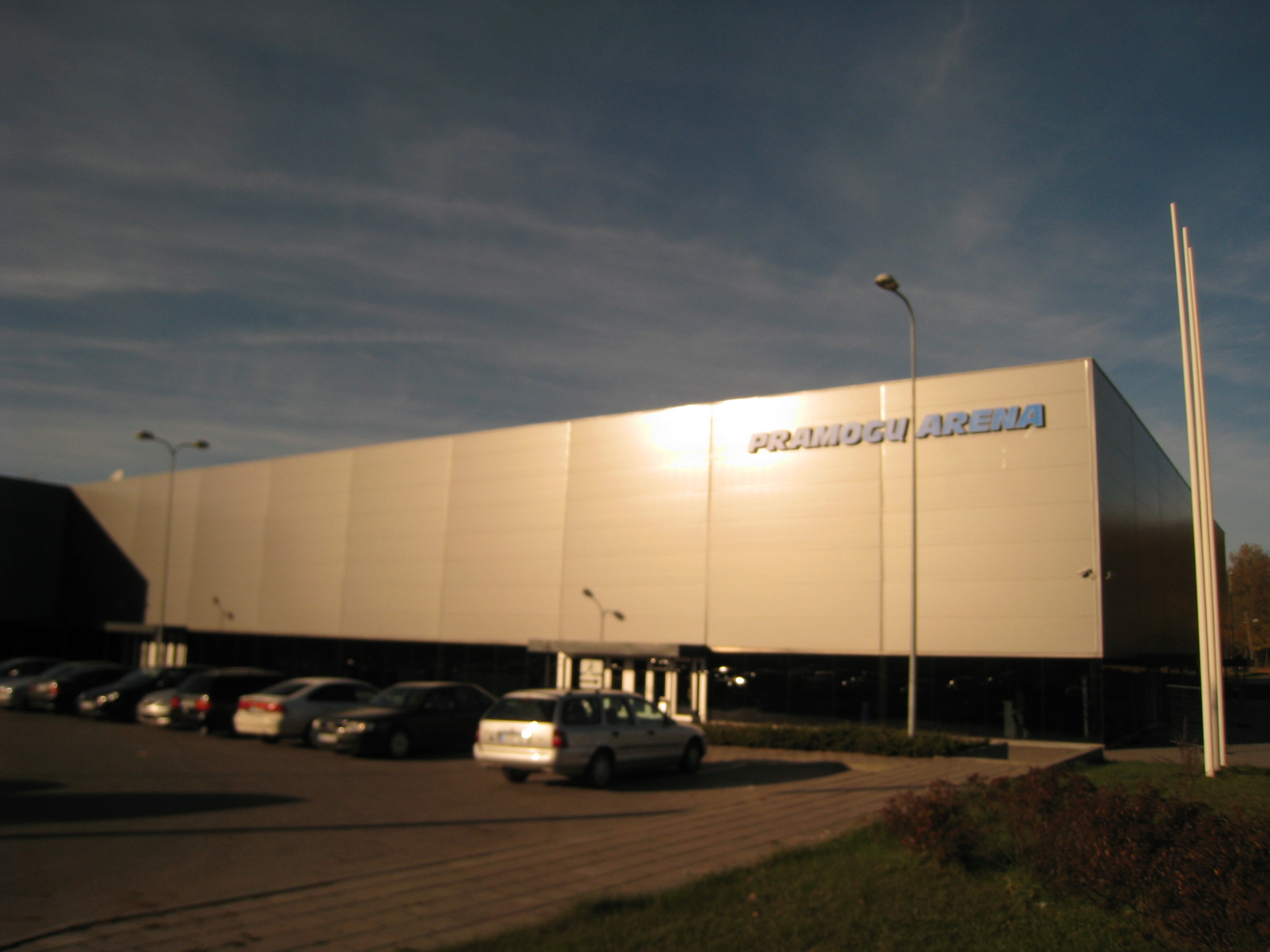

Pos	Team	Pld	W	OTW	OTL	L	GF	GA	GD	Pts	Promotion or relegation
1	Japan	5	5	0	0	0	37	7	+30	15	Promoted to the 2022 Division I B
2	Great Britain	5	3	1	0	1	23	17	+6	11	
3	Lithuania (H)	5	3	0	0	2	20	17	+3	9	
4	Romania	5	2	0	0	3	15	24	−9	6	
5	Spain	5	1	0	1	3	8	23	−15	4	
6	Serbia	5	0	0	0	5	11	26	−15	0	Relegated to the 2022 Division II B

Source: IIHF
Rules for classification: 1) points; 2) head-to-head points; 3) head-to-head goal difference; 4) head-to-head number of goals scored; 5) result against closest best-ranked team outside tied teams; 6) result against second-best-ranked team outside tied teams; 7) seeding before tournament.
(H) Host

=== Match results ===
All times are local (Eastern European Time – UTC+2).

6 January 2020; 12:00	Great Britain	3–6 (0–1, 1–2, 2–3)	Japan	Utenos pramogų arena, Vilnius; Attendance: 79

Game reference

William Kerlin
Goalies
Eiki Sato
Referee:
(Belgium) Niki De Herdt
Linesmen:
(France) Joris Barcelo
(Lithuania) Karolis Janušauskas

	0–1	08:10 – Hanzawa (Takebe)
	0–2	30:04 – Ando (Otomo, Miyata)
Mitchell-King (Larkin, Chabot) – 30:16	1–2
	1–3	35:37 – Hanzawa (Nakajima) (PP)
Buesa (Graham, Russell) – 46:53	2–3
	2–4	49:49 – Nakajima (Y. Sato, Yoneyama) (PP)
	2–5	50:31 – Ishida (Ando)
	2–6	54:49 – Ueno (Iguchi, Ando) (PP)
Graham – 58:46	3–6

14 min
Penalties
8 min
27
Shots
36

6 January 2020; 15:30	Serbia	3–5 (3–0, 0–3, 0–2)	Romania	Utenos pramogų arena, Vilnius; Attendance: 87

Game reference

Bojan Vasić
Goalies
Levente Ambrus
Arnold Demeter
Referee:
(Slovenia) Tilen Pahor
Linesmen:
(Norway) Herman Johansen
(Lithuania) Laurynas Stepankevičius

Popović (Dragović) – 07:34	1–0
Mladenović – 16:03	2–0
Mirkov – 18:38	3–0
	3–1	29:35 – Karda (Szabó)
	3–2	31:45 – Filip (Gecse)
	3–3	38:21 – Filip (Ilyés)
	3–4	40:52 – Gecse (Szabó, Filip) (PP)
	3–5	50:38 – Gecse (Silló)

16 min
Penalties
4 min
23
Shots
24

6 January 2020; 19:00	Lithuania	5–1 (4–1, 0–0, 1–0)	Spain	Utenos pramogų arena, Vilnius; Attendance: 998

Game reference

Laurynas Lubys
Goalies
Raul Barbo
Sergi Reina
Referee:
(Denmark) Niclas Lundsgaard
Linesmen:
(Hungary) Norbert Muzsik
(Russia) Nikita Vilyugin

Mažulis (SH) – 02:15	1–0
Noreika (Krasilnikovas, Motiejūnas) (SH) – 02:53	2–0
Stankius (Laimutis) – 03:47	3–0
	3–1	12:53 – Negre (Torralba, Muratet)
Motiejūnas (Mukovoz) – 13:11	4–1
Krasilnikovas (Binkulis, Stankius) (PP) – 44:06	5–1

6 min
Penalties
10 min
34
Shots
26

7 January 2020; 12:00	Japan	8–0 (2–0, 2–0, 4–0)	Romania	Utenos pramogų arena, Vilnius; Attendance: 54

Game reference

Eiki Sato
Goalies
Arnold Demeter
Referee:
(Italy) Turo Virta
Linesmen:
(Norway) Herman Johansen
(Lithuania) Laurynas Stepankevičius

Y. Sato (Hanzawa) – 00:36	1–0
Gondaira (Kaneko, Murakami) – 16:05	2–0
Hanzawa (Nakajima, Yoneyama) (PP) – 34:45	3–0
Y. Sato (Hanzawa, Nakajima) (PP2) – 36:44	4–0
Takebe (Iguchi, Momen) – 43:27	5–0
Nakajima (Gondaira) (PP2)– 46:29	6–0
Sasanaka (Gondaira, Taneichi) – 52:09	7–0
Hanzawa (Nakajima, Yoneyama) – 57:53	8–0

6 min
Penalties
12 min
43
Shots
14

7 January 2020; 15:30	Spain	3–2 (0–1, 0–0, 3–1)	Serbia	Utenos pramogų arena, Vilnius; Attendance: 103

Game reference

Raul Barbo
Goalies
Bojan Vasić
Referee:
(Belgium) Niki De Herdt
Linesmen:
(Lithuania) Karolis Janušauskas
(Russia) Nikita Vilyugin

	0–1	06:15 – Racić
Rubio (Sarmiento) – 45:13	1–1
Capillas (Zaballa) (PP) – 52:05	2–1
Sarasa (Sánchez) – 52:33	3–1
	3–2	59:19 – Tharakan (Pejčić)

4 min
Penalties
8 min
35
Shots
20

7 January 2020; 19:00	Lithuania	3–6 (1–2, 1–3, 1–1)	Great Britain	Utenos pramogų arena, Vilnius; Attendance: 907

Game reference

Laurynas Lubys
Nikita Kuzminov
Goalies
Tyler Perre
Referee:
(Slovenia) Tilen Pahor
Linesmen:
(Hungary) Norbert Muzsik
(Latvia) Dāvis Zunde

	0–1	01:58 – Mitchell-King (Larkin, Hazeldine) (PP)
	0–2	05:42 – Cooper (Alderson)
Grinius (Mažulis, Washco) – 14:28	1–2
	1–3	23:56 – Larkin
	1–4	25:06 – Buesa (Hazeldine)
	1–5	35:29 – Graham (Alderson, Neilson) (PP)
Grinius (Mažulis, Mukovoz) – 39:42	2–5
	2–6	49:06 – Mitchell-King (Larkin, Chabot)
Mažulis (Grinius) (PP) – 49:53	3–6

16 min
Penalties
16 min
31
Shots
26

9 January 2020; 12:00	Japan	8–0 (5–0, 3–0, 0–0)	Spain	Utenos pramogų arena, Vilnius; Attendance: 82

Game reference

Eiki Sato
Ryuto Nakamoto
Goalies
Sergi Reina
Raul Barbo
Referee:
(Belgium) Niki De Herdt
Linesmen:
(Lithuania) Karolis Janušauskas
(Hungary) Norbert Muzsik

Taneichi (Kaneko, Gondaira) – 02:31	1–0
Hanzawa – 05:38	2–0
Yoneyama (Nakajima, Ishida) (PP) – 06:59	3–0
Nakajima (Yoneyama, Hanzawa) (PP2) – 11:03	4–0
Miyata (Takeya) – 19:53	5–0
Ando (Ishida) – 21:31	6–0
Momen (Murakami, Takeya) – 26:02	7–0
Ando (Miura) – 37:23	8–0

37 min
Penalties
26 min
31
Shots
25

9 January 2020; 15:30	Great Britain	5–3 (2–0, 0–1, 3–2)	Romania	Utenos pramogų arena, Vilnius; Attendance: 101

Game reference

William Kerlin
Goalies
Arnold Demeter
Referee:
(Denmark) Niclas Lundsgaard
Linesmen:
(Lithuania) Laurynas Stepankevičius
(Latvia) Dāvis Zunde

Alderson (Graham, Neilson) – 00:23	1–0
Chabot (Larkin, Mitchel-King) – 15:34	2–0
	2–1	21:36 – Petrică (Ilyés, Nagy-Galaczi)
	2–2	44:27 – Cășăneanu (Gecse, Karda)
Alderson (Graham, Neilson) – 46:50	3–2
	3–3	47:54 – Részegh (Filip)
Alderson (Neilson, Hazeldine) – 48:41	4–3
Neilson (Alderson, Russell) (PP) – 53:25	5–3

22 min
Penalties
12 min
26
Shots
36

9 January 2020; 19:00	Lithuania	3–2 (2–0, 1–1, 0–1)	Serbia	Utenos pramogų arena, Vilnius; Attendance: 792

Game reference

Laurynas Lubys
Goalies
Bojan Vasić
Dušan Ilijin
Referee:
(Italy) Turo Virta
Linesmen:
(France) Joris Barcelo
(Russia) Nikita Vilyugin

Washco (Grinius, Mažulis) – 08:16	1–0
Krasilnikovas (Rumševičius, Binkulis) – 12:13	2–0
Šusterovas (Piazenko, Motiejūnas) – 32:38	3–0
	3–1	34:11 – Subotić (Dragović, Popović) (PP)
	3–2	50:56 – Mladenović (Racić, Mirkov)

6 min
Penalties
8 min
31
Shots
19

10 January 2020; 12:00	Spain	3–4 GWS (0–1, 3–2, 0–0) (OT: 0–0) (SO: 0–1)	Great Britain	Utenos pramogų arena, Vilnius; Attendance: 81

Game reference

Raul Barbo
Goalies
William Kerlin
Tyler Perre
Referee:
(Italy) Turo Virta
Linesmen:
(France) Joris Barcelo
(Lithuania) Laurynas Stepankevičius

	0–1	08:10 – Graham (Cooper, Stenton) (PP)
	0–2	23:34 – Milton
	0–3	24:44 – Cooper (Neilson, Stenton) (PP)
Layola (Zaballa) – 26:51	1–3
Rubio (De Bonilla) – 35:07	2–3
Layola (Zaballa, Capillas) – 39:29	3–3

Mendizabal (miss)
Layola (miss)
Rubio (miss)
Capillas (miss)
Shootout
(miss) Neilson
Alderson
Milton
12 min
Penalties
2 min
29
Shots
28

10 January 2020; 15:30	Serbia	2–10 (1–2, 1–5, 0–3)	Japan	Utenos pramogų arena, Vilnius; Attendance: 95

Game reference

Dušan Ilijin
Bojan Vasić
Goalies
Eiki Sato
Ryuto Nakamoto
Referee:
(Slovenia) Tilen Pahor
Linesmen:
(Lithuania) Karolis Janušauskas
(Norway) Herman Johansen

	0–1	03:22 – Miura (Ando) (PP)
Mašić – 13:09	1–1
	1–2	17:05 – Kimura (Ueno, Ishida)
	1–3	21:46 – Taneichi
	1–4	22:51 – Hanzawa (Nakajima, Yoneyama) (PP)
	1–5	23:51 – Yoneyama (Takeya, Ando)
Pejčić (Subotić) (PP) – 37:18	2–5
	2–6	37:55 – Nakajima (Iguchi, Sasanaka)
	2–7	39:53 – Momen (Taneichi, Yoneyama)
	2–8	48:30 – Iguchi
	2–9	54:39 – Iguchi (Takeya) (PP)
	2–10	57:29 – Gondaira (Ueno) (PP2)

16 min
Penalties
4 min
8
Shots
46

10 January 2020; 19:00	Romania	3–7 (2–2, 1–3, 0–2)	Lithuania	Utenos pramogų arena, Vilnius; Attendance: 1,207

Game reference

Levente Ambrus
Goalies
Laurynas Lubys
Nikita Kuzminov
Referee:
(Denmark) Niclas Lundsgaard
Linesmen:
(Hungary) Norbert Muzsik
(Latvia) Dāvis Zunde

Gecse (Sándor-Székely) – 05:59	1–0
Filip (Ilyés, Gajdó) – 08:09	2–0
	2–1	09:19 – Stankius (Silinas)
	2–2	16:23 – Grinius (Washco, Noreika)
	2–3	25:54 – R. Marcinkevičius (Šusterovas, Silinas)
	2–4	27:08 – Mažulis (Washco, Mukovoz)
Gecse (Cășăneanu, Sándor-Székely) – 33:25	3–4
	3–5	39:39 – Binkulis (Noreika, Misiukas)
	3–6	41:54 – Mukovoz (Noreika, Motiejūnas)
	3–7	57:49 – Piazenko (Misiukas)

10 min
Penalties
8 min
24
Shots
36

12 January 2020; 12:00	Great Britain	5–2 (2–0, 0–2, 3–0)	Serbia	Utenos pramogų arena, Vilnius; Attendance: 121

Game reference

Tyler Perre
Goalies
Bojan Vasić
Referee:
(Belgium) Niki De Herdt
Linesmen:
(Lithuania) Karolis Janušauskas
(Norway) Herman Johansen

Russell (Mitchell-King) (PP) – 14:23	1–0
Bradley (Neilson, Alderson) – 17:03	2–0
	2–1	22:41 – Mladenović (Dragović, Pejčić) (PP)
	2–2	34:29 – Gvozdenović (Dragović) (PP)
Graham (Cochrane, Alderson) – 50:37	3–2
Ulrick (Cooper, Buesa) – 56:53	4–2
Neilson (Bradley) – 59:24	5–2

8 min
Penalties
54 min
49
Shots
20

12 January 2020; 15:30	Romania	4–1 (1–1, 2–0, 1–0)	Spain	Utenos pramogų arena, Vilnius; Attendance: 209

Game reference

Arnold Demeter
Goalies
Raul Barbo
Referee:
(Slovenia) Tilen Pahor
Linesmen:
(Lithuania) Laurynas Stepankevičius
(Latvia) Dāvis Zunde

Sándor-Székely – 08:21	1–0
	1–1	09:07 – Sarasa (Didkovsky, Sánchez)
Karda (Cășăneanu) – 37:18	2–1
Cășăneanu (Részegh) (SH) – 39:55	3–1
Cășăneanu (Karda, Gecse) – 47:37	4–1

14 min
Penalties
8 min
35
Shots
28

12 January 2020; 19:00	Japan	5–2 (3–0, 1–0, 1–2)	Lithuania	Utenos pramogų arena, Vilnius; Attendance: 2,387

Game reference

Eiki Sato
Goalies
Nikita Kuzminov
Laurynas Lubys
Referee:
(Denmark) Niclas Lundsgaard
Linesmen:
(France) Joris Barcelo
(Russia) Nikita Vilyugin

Y. Sato (Yoneyama, Hanzawa) – 00:13	1–0
Takeya (Ando, Yoneyama) – 09:28	2–0
Hanzawa (Y. Sato, Murakami) – 15:49	3–0
Y. Sato (Hanzawa, Nakajima) – 25:58	4–0
	4–1	48:08 – Mažulis (Grinius)
	4–2	53:02 – Grinius (Mažulis, Washco) (PP)
Nakajima – 57:51	5–2

4 min
Penalties
8 min
30
Shots
21

=== Statistics ===
==== Top 10 scorers ====
Pos	Player	Country	GP	G	A	Pts	+/–	PIM
1	Teruto Nakajima	Japan	5	5	8	13	+6	0
2	Chikara Hanzawa	Japan	5	7	5	12	+8	2
3	Koki Yoneyama	Japan	5	2	8	10	+5	2
4	Timonas Mažulis	Lithuania	5	4	4	8	+2	6
5	Mason Alderson	Great Britain	5	3	5	8	+5	2
5	Yusaku Ando	Japan	5	3	5	8	+6	2
7	Cade Neilson	Great Britain	5	2	6	8	+5	0
8	Olivér Gecse	Romania	5	4	3	7	0	6
8	Alex Graham	Great Britain	5	4	3	7	+7	8
8	Martynas Grinius	Lithuania	5	4	3	7	+2	2

GP = Games played; G = Goals; A = Assists; Pts = Points; +/− = Plus–minus; PIM = Penalties In Minutes
Source: IIHF.com

==== Goaltending leaders ====
(minimum 40% team's total ice time)

Pos	Player	Country	TOI	GA	Sv%	GAA	SO
1	Eiki Sato	Japan	260:00	7	91.67	1.62	1
2	Tyler Perre	Great Britain	145:00	5	91.23	2.07	0
3	Bojan Vasić	Serbia	232:08	19	87.74	4.91	0
4	William Kerlin	Great Britain	160:00	12	87.37	4.50	0
5	Arnold Demeter	Romania	219:18	14	87.04	3.83	0

TOI = Time on ice (minutes:seconds); GA = Goals against; GAA = Goals against average; Sv% = Save percentage; SO = Shutouts
Source: IIHF.com

=== Awards ===
Best Players Selected by the Directorate

- Goaltender: (Japan) Eiki Sato
- Defenceman: (Lithuania) Paulius Rumševičius
- Forward: (Japan) Chikara Hanzawa

Source: IIHF

== Division II B ==
2020 IIHF U20 World Championship Division II B

Tournament details
- Host country: South Korea
- Venue: 1 (in 1 host city)
- Dates: 27 January – 3 February 2020
- Teams: 6

Tournament statistics
- Games played: 15
- Goals scored: 121 (8.07 per game)
- Attendance: 5,022 (335 per game)
- Scoring leader: (Croatia) Dominic Čanić (16 points)

Official website
- www.iihf.com

The Division II B tournament was played in Gangneung, South Korea, from 27 January to 3 February 2020.

=== Participating teams ===
Team	Qualification
South Korea	Hosts; placed 6th in Division II A last year and were relegated.
Croatia	Placed 2nd in Division II B last year.
Netherlands	Placed 3rd in Division II B last year.
Belgium	Placed 4th in Division II B last year.
Israel	Placed 5th in Division II B last year.
China	Placed 1st in Division III last year and were promoted.

=== Match officials ===
4 referees and 7 linesmen were selected for the tournament.

Referees

- (United Kingdom) Stefan Hogarth
- (Lithuania) Benas Jakšys
- (China) Liu Ren
- (United States) Andrew Wilk

Linesmen

- (South Korea) Chae Young-jin
- (Malaysia) Yong Elbert Cheah
- (United Kingdom) Ryan Fraley
- (Japan) Go Hashimoto
- (United Kingdom) James Ions
- (China) Li Lintai
- (South Korea) Seo Kwang-suk

=== Final standings ===
Division II B Venue
Gangneung
Gangneung Hockey Centre
Capacity: 10,000
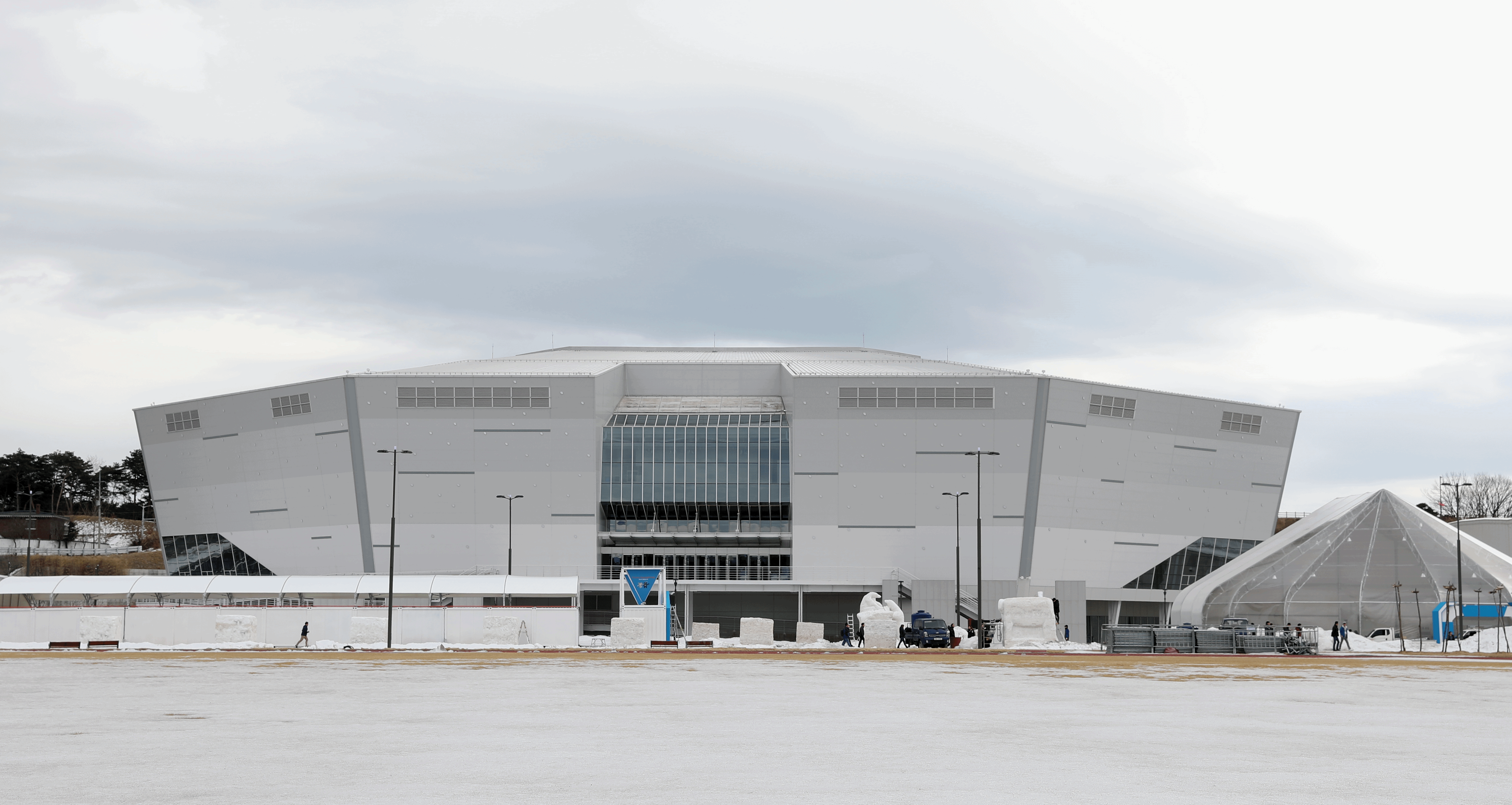

Pos	Team	Pld	W	OTW	OTL	L	GF	GA	GD	Pts	Promotion or relegation
1	South Korea (H)	5	5	0	0	0	20	6	+14	15	Promoted to the 2022 Division II A
2	Netherlands	5	3	0	0	2	30	13	+17	9 (Note: Netherlands 3 Pts, +3 GD; China 3 Pts, –1 GD; Croatia 3 Pts, –2 GD)	
3	China	5	3	0	0	2	22	10	+12	9	
4	Croatia	5	3	0	0	2	31	17	+14	9	
5	Belgium	5	1	0	0	4	15	25	−10	3	
6	Israel	5	0	0	0	5	3	50	−47	0	Relegated to the 2022 Division III

Source: IIHF
Rules for classification: 1) points; 2) head-to-head points; 3) head-to-head goal difference; 4) head-to-head number of goals scored; 5) result against closest best-ranked team outside tied teams; 6) result against second-best-ranked team outside tied teams; 7) seeding before tournament.
(H) Host

=== Match results ===
All times are local (Time in South Korea – UTC+9).

28 January 2020; 13:00	Croatia	16–1 (3–0, 7–1, 6–0)	Israel	Gangneung Hockey Centre, Gangneung; Attendance: 104

Game reference

Domagoj Troha
Luka Goršić
Goalies
Yehonatan Reisinger
Daniel Kreiner
Referee:
(China) Liu Ren
Linesmen:
(Japan) Go Hashimoto
(United Kingdom) James Ions

Čanić (Dobrić) – 03:51	1–0
Selitaj (Čanić, Dobrić) – 12:45	2–0
Bebek (Idžan, Belina) (PP) – 17:30	3–0
Dobrić (Selitaj, Čanić) – 20:28	4–0
Paulović (Selitaj, Dobrićk) (PP) – 22:26	5–0
Čanić (Selitaj) – 24:55	6–0
	6–1	25:57 – Rossokhovatskiy (Kostrinsky)
Pleština (Cerovečki) – 27:52	7–1
Polonijo – 28:38	8–1
Selitaj (Čanić) – 33:04	9–1
Čanić (Paulović) – 39:59	10–1
Hanžek (Paulović) (SH) – 49:35	11–1
Rakar (Mandić) – 52:58	12–1
Idžan (Polonijo) – 54:32	13–1
Čanić (Paulović) – 56:03	14–1
Hanžek (Rakar, Belina) – 56:38	15–1
Mandić – 59:51	16–1

2 min
Penalties
6 min
79
Shots
8

28 January 2020; 16:30	China	5–3 (1–2, 1–0, 3–1)	Belgium	Gangneung Hockey Centre, Gangneung; Attendance: 133

Game reference

Wu Siming
Goalies
Arne Waumans
Referee:
(United Kingdom) Stefan Hogarth
Linesmen:
(Malaysia) Yong Elbert Cheah
(South Korea) Seo Kwang-suk

	0–1	16:01 – Versin (Coolen) (PP)
	0–2	16:14 – Delbrassine (Compere)
Zheng (Yan J.) (PP) – 19:10	1–2
Wang J. (Hou) – 21:19	2–2
	2–3	41:35 – Laeremans (Versin)
Hou (Yan R., Wang) – 50:34	3–3
Li X. (Wang J.) (PP) – 55:26	4–3
Guo J. (Yan J.) – 55:42	5–3

8 min
Penalties
6 min
30
Shots
29

28 January 2020; 20:00	Netherlands	1–5 (1–2, 0–0, 0–3)	South Korea	Gangneung Hockey Centre, Gangneung; Attendance: 875

Game reference

Jowin Ansems
Goalies
Kim Hyung-chan
Referee:
(United States) Andrew Wilk
Linesmen:
(United Kingdom) Ryan Fraley
(China) Li Lintai

	0–1	05:37 – Mun (Kim M., Kang M.)
	0–2	12:08 – Kim Jae-s. (Jeong, Kim Hyo.)
De Ruiter (Collard, Van Elten) – 16:38	1–2
	1–3	41:22 – Kim Hyo. (Park S., Ahn)
	1–4	46:57 – Choi (Lee M., Lee J.)
	1–5	56:17 – Jeong (Kang M.)

4 min
Penalties
8 min
22
Shots
40

29 January 2020; 13:00	Israel	0–12 (0–5, 0–4, 0–3)	China	Gangneung Hockey Centre, Gangneung; Attendance: 148

Game reference

Daniel Kreiner
Yehonatan Reisinger
Goalies
Hu Haoran
Referee:
(Lithuania) Benas Jakšys
Linesmen:
(South Korea) Chae Young-jin
(United Kingdom) James Ions

0–1	01:49 – Li X.
0–2	06:14 – Wang J. (Hou, Yan R.) (PP)
0–3	07:51 – Yan J.
0–4	16:07 – Zheng (Guo J.)
0–5	18:04 – Wang J. (Hou)
0–6	31:04 – Zheng (Guo J., Yan J.)
0–7	32:27 – Yu (Li X.)
0–8	33:48 – Yan J. (Guo J.) (SH)
0–9	39:59 – Hou (Yan R., Wang J.)
0–10	40:24 – Zheng (Guo J., Yan J.)
0–11	42:26 – Yan J. (Wang Y.)
0–12	46:24 – Yan J. (Li Zi., Li Ze.)

4 min
Penalties
6 min
9
Shots
60

29 January 2020; 16:30	Croatia	2–7 (0–5, 1–0, 1–2)	Netherlands	Gangneung Hockey Centre, Gangneung; Attendance: 153

Game reference

Domagoj Troha
Luka Goršić
Goalies
Jowin Ansems
Referee:
(United Kingdom) Stefan Hogarth
Linesmen:
(Malaysia) Yong Elbert Cheah
(United Kingdom) Ryan Fraley

	0–1	02:59 – Jacobs (Sars, D. Hessels)
	0–2	08:45 – Sars (D. Hessels)
	0–3	12:26 – Sars (Borgman)
	0–4	14:35 – Sars (D. Hessels, Jacobs)
	0–5	15:44 – Huisman (D. Hessels, Van der Meulen)
Dobrić (Čanić, Selitaj) (PP2) – 35:43	1–5
Selitaj (Čanić, Dobrić) – 43:06	2–5
	2–6	53:17 – Collard (R. Ansems, Gerretsen)
	2–7	54:25 – Sars (N. Hessels, Gerretsen) (SH)

4 min
Penalties
24 min
27
Shots
33

29 January 2020; 20:00	South Korea	5–2 (2–2, 2–0, 1–0)	Belgium	Gangneung Hockey Centre, Gangneung; Attendance: 402

Game reference

Kim Hyung-chan
Goalies
Arne Waumans
Referee:
(China) Liu Ren
Linesmen:
(Japan) Go Hashimoto
(China) Li Lintai

	0–1	01:01 – Coolen (Klijsen, De Ceuster)
Kim M. (Lee J.) – 02:51	1–1
Kim Hyo. – 10:08	2–1
	2–2	10:53 – De Ceuster (Klijsen)
Lee J. (Jeong) – 26:54	3–2
Kim W. – 39:11	4–2
Mun (Kang M., Lee M.) – 44:43	5–2

2 min
Penalties
4 min
44
Shots
18

31 January 2020; 13:00	Netherlands	6–1 (1–0, 3–0, 2–1)	Belgium	Gangneung Hockey Centre, Gangneung; Attendance: 147

Game reference

Jowin Ansems
Goalies
Jelle Lievens
Referee:
(United States) Andrew Wilk
Linesmen:
(China) Li Lintai
(South Korea) Seo Kwang-suk

Huisman (Versteeg, Van der Meulen) – 10:55	1–0
Sars (D. Hessels, De Ruiter) (PP) – 20:27	2–0
Jacobs (D. Hessels, Sars) – 26:02	3–0
Maas (Borgman) – 35:23	4–0
Sars (Jacobs, De Ruiter) – 41:14	5–0
N. Hessels (Sars, Jacobs) (PP) – 51:47	6–0
	6–1	57:15 – Coolen (Compere, Versin)

8 min
Penalties
10 min
36
Shots
17

31 January 2020; 16:30	Croatia	3–0 (2–0, 1–0, 0–0)	China	Gangneung Hockey Centre, Gangneung; Attendance: 173

Game reference

Domagoj Troha
Goalies
Wu Siming
Hu Haoran
Referee:
(Lithuania) Benas Jakšys
Linesmen:
(South Korea) Chae Young-jin
(Japan) Go Hashimoto

Kramarić (Dobrić, Paulović) – 09:53	1–0
Selitaj (Dobrić, Čanić) (PP2) – 14:55	2–0
Hanžek (Kramarić, Mandić) – 34:37	3–0

10 min
Penalties
8 min
25
Shots
32

31 January 2020; 20:00	South Korea	5–1 (1–0, 1–0, 3–1)	Israel	Gangneung Hockey Centre, Gangneung; Attendance: 753

Game reference

Kim Hyung-chan
Kim Gi-wan
Goalies
Yehonatan Reisinger
Referee:
(United Kingdom) Stefan Hogarth
Linesmen:
(Malaysia) Yong Elbert Cheah
(United Kingdom) James Ions

Kim Jae-s. – 14:14	1–0
Kang M. (Kim M., Lee M.) – 24:41	2–0
Lee M. (Kim Hyo., Kim Jae-s.) – 47:49	3–0
Yoo (Lee M.) – 53:13	4–0
Kim Jae-s. (Jeong) – 55:50	5–0
	5–1	59:42 – Rozin (Halpert, Rossokhovatskiy) (PP)

4 min
Penalties
8 min
68
Shots
6

1 February 2020; 13:00	Belgium	5–8 (2–2, 1–4, 2–2)	Croatia	Gangneung Hockey Centre, Gangneung; Attendance: 146

Game reference

Jelle Lievens
Arne Waumans
Goalies
Domagoj Troha
Referee:
(United Kingdom) Stefan Hogarth
Linesmen:
(United Kingdom) James Ions
(China) Li Lintai

Coolen (De Ceuster) – 07:37	1–0
Daems (Delbrassine) – 09:00	2–0
	2–1	15:22 – Đerek (Čanić, Selitaj)
	2–2	16:56 – Paulović (Dobrić, Selitaj) (PP)
Delbrassine (Coolen, De Ceuster) – 23:24	3–2
	3–3	25:16 – Polonijo (SH)
	3–4	29:04 – Mandić (Selitaj, Čanić)
	3–5	34:55 – Mandić (Paulović, Selitaj)
	3–6	37:36 – Selitaj (Čanić, Dobrić)
Steeno (EA) – 45:33	4–6
	4–7	49:24 – Đerek (Dobrić, Čanić)
	4–8	50:12 – Mandić (Idžan, Polonijo) (PP)
Compere (Daems, Bollen) (PP) – 51:09	5–8

24 min
Penalties
10 min
27
Shots
31

1 February 2020; 16:30	China	0–1 (0–0, 0–1, 0–0)	South Korea	Gangneung Hockey Centre, Gangneung; Attendance: 1,025

Game reference
Wu Siming	Goalies	Kim Hyung-chan	Referee: (United States) Andrew Wilk; Linesmen: (United Kingdom) Ryan Fraley (Japan) Go Hashimoto
0–1 / 27:04 – Kang M. (Mun)			Referee: (United States) Andrew Wilk; Linesmen: (United Kingdom) Ryan Fraley (Japan) Go Hashimoto
4 min	Penalties	27 min	Referee: (United States) Andrew Wilk; Linesmen: (United Kingdom) Ryan Fraley (Japan) Go Hashimoto
18	Shots	41	Referee: (United States) Andrew Wilk; Linesmen: (United Kingdom) Ryan Fraley (Japan) Go Hashimoto

1 February 2020; 20:00	Israel	0–13 (0–6, 0–3, 0–4)	Netherlands	Gangneung Hockey Centre, Gangneung; Attendance: 123

Game reference

Daniel Kreiner
Yehonatan Reisinger
Goalies
Julien van Nes
Referee:
(China) Liu Ren
Linesmen:
(South Korea) Chae Young-jin
(South Korea) Seo Kwang-suk

0–1	00:27 – D. Hessels (Jacobs, N. Hessels)
0–2	04:16 – De Ruiter (Collard, Gerretsen)
0–3	06:28 – D. Hessels (Jacobs, N. Hessels)
0–4	08:25 – Sars (D. Hessels, N. Hessels) (PP)
0–5	13:22 – Huisman (Versteeg, Van der Meulen)
0–6	18:19 – Jacobs (D. Hessels)
0–7	23:07 – Collard (De Ruiter)
0–8	23:44 – Hendriks (Van der Genugten, R. Ansems)
0–9	31:16 – D. Hessels (PP)
0–10	45:12 – D. Hessels (Jacobs, Collard)
0–11	53:23 – Van Elten (PP)
0–12	54:30 – R. Ansems (Gerretsen, Van Baarsen)
0–13	54:40 – R. Ansems (De Ruiter, Collard)

8 min
Penalties
2 min
9
Shots
63

3 February 2020; 13:00	Netherlands	3–5 (0–2, 1–1, 2–2)	China	Gangneung Hockey Centre, Gangneung; Attendance: 147

Game reference

Jowin Ansems
Goalies
Wu Siming
Referee:
(United Kingdom) Stefan Hogarth
Linesmen:
(South Korea) Chae Young-jin
(South Korea) Seo Kwang-suk

	0–1	06:23 – Yu (Guo Z., Li X.)
	0–2	12:15 – Yan J. (Yan R., Wang J.) (PP2)
	0–3	23:33 – Hou (Yan J., Wang J.) (PP)
Jacobs (Sars, De Ruiter) (PP) – 31:03	1–3
Huisman (Van der Meulen, Versteeg) – 41:22	2–3
Versteeg (Huisman, Borgman) – 46:53	3–3
	3–4	51:11 – Wang J. (Hou, Yan J.)
	3–5	59:19 – Wang J. (ENG)

20 min
Penalties
6 min
37
Shots
21

3 February 2020; 16:30	Belgium	4–1 (1–1, 1–0, 2–0)	Israel	Gangneung Hockey Centre, Gangneung; Attendance: 150

Game reference

Jelle Lievens
Goalies
Yehonatan Reisinger
Referee:
(Lithuania) Benas Jakšys
Linesmen:
(Malaysia) Yong Elbert Cheah
(China) Li Lintai

	0–1	02:13 – Rozin (Halpert)
Coolen – 16:49	1–1
Vangenechten (Adriaenssens, Steeno) (PP) – 27:59	2–1
Delbrassine (Moons) – 48:03	3–1
Versin (De Ceuster, Laeremans) (PP) – 49:03	4–1

6 min
Penalties
10 min
69
Shots
9

3 February 2020; 20:00	South Korea	4–2 (1–0, 0–0, 3–2)	Croatia	Gangneung Hockey Centre, Gangneung; Attendance: 543

Game reference

Kim Hyung-chan
Goalies
Domagoj Troha
Referee:
(United States) Andrew Wilk
Linesmen:
(United Kingdom) Ryan Fraley
(Japan) Go Hashimoto

Mun (Kang H.) – 03:04	1–0
	1–1	41:09 – Paulović (Dobrić, Čanić) (PP)
Choi (Kim Y.) – 47:36	2–1
	2–2	49:26 – Selitaj (Čanić, Paulović) (PP)
Lee M. – 52:13	3–2
Kim Hyo. – 58:57	4–2

24 min
Penalties
6 min
30
Shots
26

=== Statistics ===
==== Top 10 scorers ====
Pos	Player	Country	GP	G	A	Pts	+/–	PIM
1	Dominic Čanić	Croatia	5	4	12	16	+7	0
2	Leo Selitaj	Croatia	5	6	8	14	+8	10
3	Wouter Sars	Netherlands	5	7	5	12	+7	2
4	Delaney Hessels	Netherlands	5	4	8	12	+7	0
5	Patrik Dobrić	Croatia	5	2	10	12	+1	2
6	Yan Juncheng	China	5	5	6	11	+8	0
7	Wang Jing	China	5	5	5	10	+5	4
8	Tijn Jacobs	Netherlands	5	4	6	10	+7	4
9	Sven Paulović	Croatia	4	3	6	9	+10	0
10	Hou Yuyang	China	5	3	4	7	+5	6

GP = Games played; G = Goals; A = Assists; Pts = Points; +/− = Plus–minus; PIM = Penalties In Minutes
Source: IIHF

==== Goaltending leaders ====
(minimum 40% team's total ice time)

Pos	Player	Country	TOI	GA	Sv%	GAA	SO
1	Kim Hyung-chan	South Korea	280:00	7	94.19	1.07	1
2	Wu Siming	China	236:29	10	92.42	2.54	0
3	Jowin Ansems	Netherlands	239:49	12	88.46	3.00	0
4	Yehonatan Reisinger	Israel	221:48	29	88.16	7.84	0
5	Domagoj Troha	Croatia	225:11	14	86.79	3.73	1

TOI = Time on ice (minutes:seconds); GA = Goals against; GAA = Goals against average; Sv% = Save percentage; SO = Shutouts
Source: IIHF

=== Awards ===
Best Players Selected by the Directorate

- Goaltender: (South Korea) Kim Hyung-chan
- Defenceman: (South Korea) Lee Min-jae
- Forward: (Croatia) Dominic Čanić

Source: IIHF
