= Dilan Savenkov =

Estonian ice hockey player (born 2001)

- Born: 6 August 2001 (age 25) Tallinn, Estonia
- Height: 6 ft 2 in (188 cm)
- Weight: 183 lb (83 kg; 13 st 1 lb)
- Position: Defenceman
- Shoots: Right
- ECHL team Former teams: Norfolk Admirals; TUTO Hockey; Reading Royals; Orlando Solar Bears; Cincinnati Cyclones; Trois-Rivières Lions; Savannah Ghost Pirates; Utah Grizzlies
- National team: Estonia
- Playing career: 2023–present

Dilan Savenkov (born 6 August 2001) is an Estonian professional ice hockey defenceman currently playing for the Norfolk Admirals of the ECHL.

== Club career ==
As a youth, Savenkov played for the under-16 team of Espoo Blues in Finland for the 2016–17 season. For the 2018–19 season, he joined the Sherbrooke Phoenix of the Quebec Major Junior Hockey League. He played fourteen games during the season, collecting two assists, before being released by the club in January 2019. He then joined the St-Jérôme Panthers of the Quebec Junior Hockey League in November 2019. He would then go on to play for several clubs in the North American Hockey League including the Shreveport Mudbugs, Lone Star Brahmas, Kenai River Brown Bears, and New Jersey Junior Titans between 2018 and 2021. Savenkov won the Robertson Cup with the Mudbugs during his final season in the league.

Starting in 2021, Savenkov played two seasons of U Sports ice hockey for the Alberta Golden Bears of the University of Alberta. He accumulated three goals and four assists in thirty games before being invited to training camp with the Springfield Thunderbirds of the American Hockey League in October 2023. He signed his first professional contract with the Trois-Rivières Lions of the ECHL on 9 October 2023 and made his profession debut with the club on 29 October in a 6–7 loss to the Reading Royals.

Savenkov played for six total ECHL clubs between the 2023–24 and 2024–25 seasons. The clubs included the Reading Royals, Orlando Solar Bears, Cincinnati Cyclones, Savannah Ghost Pirates, and Utah Grizzlies, in addition to the Trois-Rivières Lions. In spring 2024, Savenkov was invited back to the Springfield Thunderbirds AHL training camp. He appeared for the team in the final exhibition of the pre-season, a game against the Providence Bruins on 5 October 2024. He was then sent back to his training camp with the Worcester Railers following the game.

In December 2025, Savenkov returned to Europe, signing a one-year contract with TUTO Hockey of Finland's Mestis. The contract included a one-month trial period and a club option for an additional year. Savenkov went on to play eight games for TUTO, tallying one goal and four assists while earning a +12 rating. In January 2026, he returned to the ECHL, signing a standard contract with the Norfolk Admirals.

== International career ==
Savenkov played for Estonia's U-18 and U-20 national teams as a youth. He was a part of the national under-20 squad that won Division II A of the 2019 World Junior Ice Hockey Championships hosted by Estonia. He scored in the eventual 7–2 victory over South Korea to clinch promotion to the Division I for the first time since 2009. As one of the youngest players on the team, he also tallied an assist in the competition, his first major tournament with the national under-20 side.
