= Tondiraba Ice Hall =

Multi-purpose indoor arena complex in Tallinn, Estonia

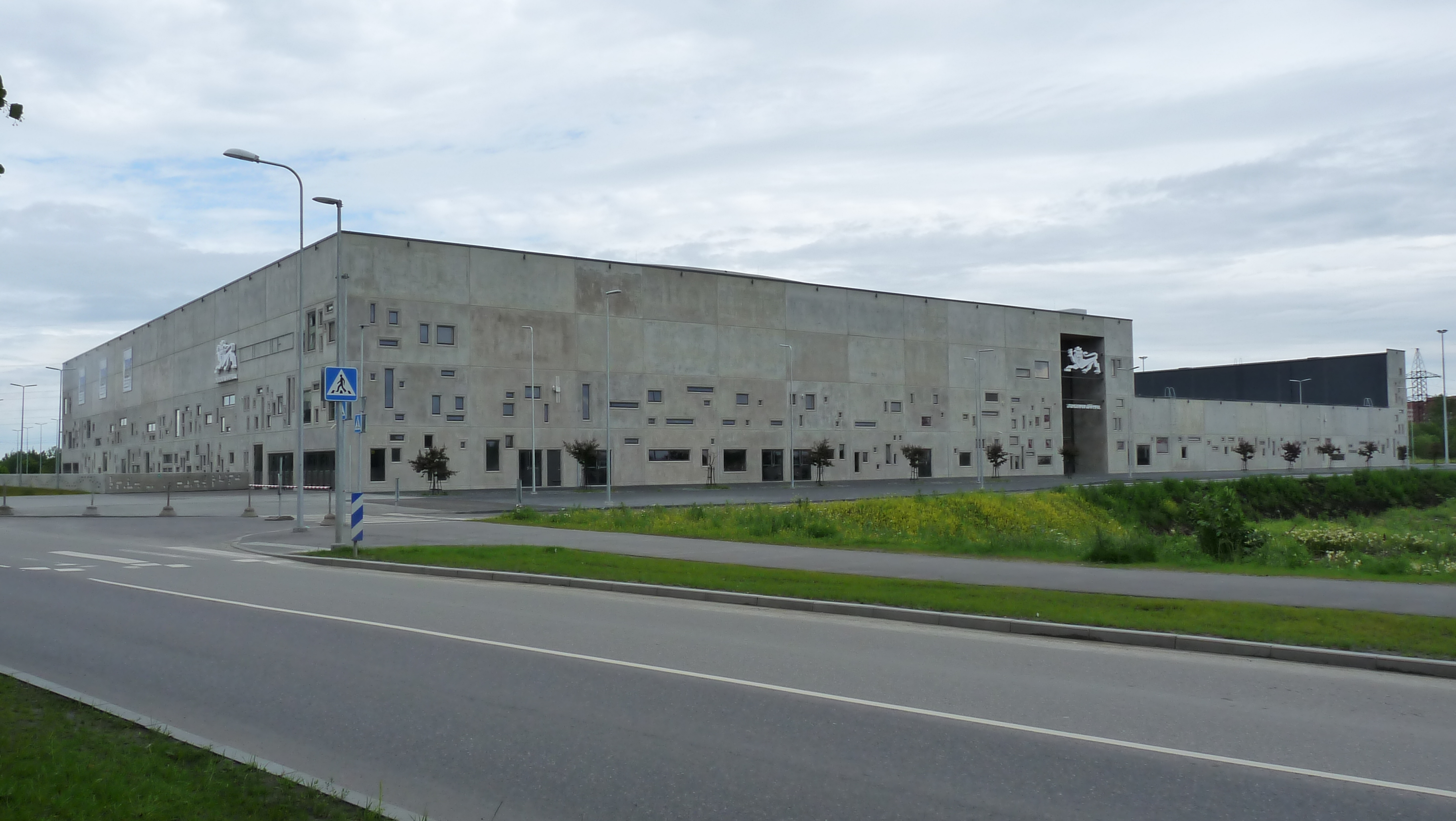
- Interactive map of Tondiraba Ice Hall
- Location: Varraku 14, Tondiraba, Lasnamäe, 13917 Tallinn, Estonia
- Coordinates: 59°26′36.713″N 24°50′53.01″E
- Owner: City of Tallinn
- Capacity: Basketball: 5,840; Concert: 7,700; Ice hockey: 5,840

Construction
- Groundbreaking: 20 June 2013
- Opened: 1 August 2014
- Cost: €22 million
- Architect: Kadarik Tüür Arhitektid OÜ

Tenants
- HC Vipers Tallinn (2011–); Kalev/Cramo (2014–2015); HC Viking (2014–present); Selver Tallinn (2014–present); Estonia national basketball team (2014); Estonia men's national ice hockey team (2015–present)

Website
- www.tondirabaicehall.ee

The Tondiraba Ice Hall (Estonian: Tondiraba jäähall), also known as Tallinn Arena, is a multi-purpose indoor arena complex in Tallinn, Estonia. It was opened on 1 August 2014 and is owned by the City of Tallinn. It has a current capacity of 7,700 spectators for concerts, for ice hockey and basketball it can hold up to 5,840 spectators. It can host among other things basketball games, ice hockey games, curling and concerts.

== History ==
Tondiraba Ice Rink was opened in August 2014 as the first large building of the Tondiraba Sports Complex. It has a main arena, two practice rinks and a curling rink. The main arena can be used for sports including figure skating, ice hockey, short track speed skating, volleyball, handball, gymnastics and also concerts.

The ISU World Junior Figure Skating Championships 2015, held from 2 March to 8 March that year, claimed to be the first championship held in the complex. However, the 2015 World Junior Curling Championships logically deserves this title as despite concluding on the same date, it began several days earlier on 28 February.

One Finnish Liiga hockey match has been played in the Tondiraba Ice Hall between HPK and Pelicans, on 27 January 2018. HPK won the game 3–4 after the shootout. In January 2020, two Liiga hockey games has played in the Tondiraba Ice Hall between Ilves and SaiPa. Which ended with a 4-1 victory for Ilves. Other match was Lukko and Pelicans. Lukko won the match 5-3.

Tondiraba hosted the 2018 European Curling Championships from 16–24 November and 2022 European Figure Skating Championships from 10-16 January.

The 2023 FIBA Olympic Pre-Qualifying Tournament Group A was organized in there.

The arena played host to the IIHF World Championships in 2019 Division IB tournament and 2025 Division IB tournament.

The arena played host to the IIHF World Junior Championships for their Division IIA tournament in 2019, and the Division IB tournament in 2025.

== See also ==
- List of indoor arenas in Estonia
