= Srđan Subotić =

Croatian basketball coach

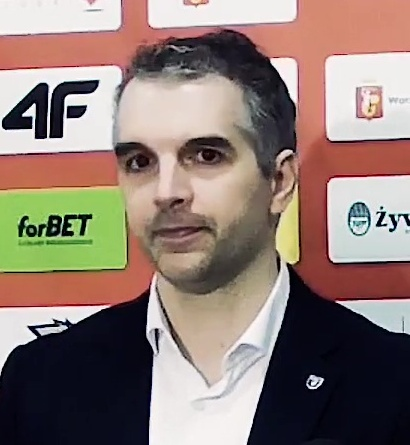

Twarde Pierniki Toruń
- Title: Head coach
- League: PLK

Personal information
- Born: 27 February 1980 (age 46) Split, SR Croatia, Yugoslavia
- Listed height: 1.93 m (6 ft 4 in)
- Listed weight: 88 kg (194 lb)

Career information
- NBA draft: 2002: undrafted
- Playing career: 1999–2017
- Position: Point guard
- Number: 4
- Coaching career: 2017–present

Career history

Playing
- 1999–2003: Split
- 2003–2004: Krka
- 2004–2005: Verviers-Pepinster
- 2005–2006: Turów Zgorzelec
- 2006–2008: Jämtland
- 2008–2009: Sundsvall Dragons
- 2009–2012: Cedevita
- 2014–2015: Jolly JBS
- 2015–2017: Split

Coaching
- 2019–2021: Split (assistant)
- 2021–2023: Split
- 2023–present: Croatia U18
- 2023–present: Polski Cukier Toruń

Career highlights
- As player: Croatian League champion (2003); Swedish Basketball League champion (2009); 2× Macedonian First League champion (2013, 2014); Croatian Cup winner (2012); 2× Macedonian Cup winner (2013, 2014); Dražen Petrović Cup winner (2011)
Medals
Men's basketball
Representing Croatia
FIBA U21 World Championship
Silver medal – second place	2001 Japan	Under-21
FIBA U-19 World Cup
Bronze medal – third place	1999 Portugal	Under-19
European U-18 Championship
Silver medal – second place	1998 Bulgaria	Under-18

Srđan Subotić (pronounced [sř̩d͡ʑan sǔbotitɕ]; born 27 February 1980) is a Croatian professional basketball coach and former player who is the head coach for Polski Cukier Toruń of the Polish Basketball League (PLK) and for the men's Croatia national under-18 team.

== Professional career ==
A point guard, Subotić spent his playing career in Croatia, Slovenia, Belgium, Poland and Sweden. During his playing days, he played for Split, Krka, Verviers-Pepinster, Turów Zgorzelec, Jämtland, the Sundsvall Dragons, Cedevita, and Jolly JBS. In 2008, while playing for the Sundsvall Dragons in Sweden his teammate was 6-time NBA champion and 7-time NBA All-Star Scottie Pippen. He retired as a player with Split in 2017.

== National team career ==
In July 1998, Subotić was a member of the Croatia under-18 team that won the silver medal at the FIBA Europe Under-18 Championship in Varna, Bulgaria. Over eight tournament games, he averaged 6.2 points, 1.1 rebounds, and 1.1 assists per game. In July 1999, Subotić was a member of the Croatia under-19 team that won the bronze medal at the FIBA Under-19 World Championship in Portugal. Over eight tournament games, he averaged 5.4 points, 1.8 rebounds, and 2.5 assists per game. In 2000, Subotić was a member of the Croatia under-20 team at the European Championship for Young Men in Ohrid, Macedonia. Over seven tournament games, he averaged five points and 1.4 assists per game. In August 2001, Subotić was a member of the Croatia under-21 team that won the silver medal at the FIBA Under-21 World Championship in Saitama, Japan. Over eight tournament games, he averaged six points, 1.8 rebounds, and 2.5 assists per game.

On 2 December 1998, Subotić made his debut for the Croatia national team in a 111–77 win over Iceland in Šibenik at the FIBA EuroBasket 1999 qualification semi-final round. He recorded 9 points in 6 minutes. Later, he played one more game in the EuroBasket 1999 qualification.

== Coaching career ==
After retirement in 2017, Subotić joined a youth system of Split as the under-16 head coach. In December 2019, he became an assistant coach for the Split's senior team under Ivica Skelin.

On 9 August 2021, Split promoted Subotić as the new head coach of its senior team.

On 14 March 2023, the Croatian Basketball Federation (HKS) confirmed Subotić as the new head coach for the under-18 men's Croatia national team.

== Career achievements ==
As player

- Croatian League champion: 1 (with Split: 2002–03)
- Swedish Basketball League champion: 1 (with Sundsvall Dragons: 2008–09)
- Macedonian First League champion: 2 (with MZT Skopje: 2012–13, 2013–14)
- Croatian Cup winner: 1 (with Cedevita: 2011–12)
- Macedonian Cup winner: 2 (with MZT Skopje: 2012–13, 2013–14)
- Dražen Petrović Cup winner: 1 (with Cedevita: 2011)
