= 2013 World Junior Ice Hockey Championships – Division I =

International ice hockey tournament

2013 IIHF U20 World Championship Division I

Tournament details
- Host countries: France; Ukraine
- Venues: 2 (in 2 host cities)
- Dates: 9–15 December 2012; 10–16 December 2012
- Teams: 12

The 2013 World Junior Ice Hockey Championship Division I was a pair of international under-20 ice hockey tournaments organized by the International Ice Hockey Federation. In each of the two groups, six teams played a round-robin tournament; the first-placed team was promoted to a higher level, while the last-placed team was relegated to a lower level. Divisions I A and I B represent the second and third tier of the World Junior Ice Hockey Championships.

== Division I A ==
The Division I A tournament was played in Amiens, France, from 9 to 15 December 2012.

=== Participating teams ===
Team	Qualification
Denmark	Placed 10th in Top Division last year and were relegated.
Belarus	Placed 2nd in Division I A last year.
Norway	Placed 3rd in Division I A last year.
Slovenia	Placed 4th in Division I A last year.
Austria	Placed 5th in Division I A last year.
France	Hosts; placed 1st in Division I B last year and were promoted.

=== Match officials ===
Referees

- (United States) Thomas Chmielewski
- (United Kingdom) Tom Darnell
- (Slovakia) Juraj Konc
- (Finland) Anssi Salonen

Linesmen

- (France) Matthieu Barbez
- (France) Thomas Caillot
- (United Kingdom) Scott Dalgleish
- (Germany) Andreas Kowert
- (Denmark) Jacques Riisom-Birker
- (Italy) David Tschirner
- (Japan) Sotaro Yamaguchi

=== Final standings ===
Pos	Team	Pld	W	OTW	OTL	L	GF	GA	GD	Pts	Promotion or relegation
1	Norway	5	4	1	0	0	19	7	+12	14	Promoted to the 2014 Top Division
2	Belarus	5	4	0	0	1	19	8	+11	12	
3	Denmark	5	3	0	1	1	20	15	+5	10	
4	Slovenia	5	1	1	0	3	13	14	−1	5	
5	Austria	5	1	0	1	3	13	21	−8	4	
6	France (H)	5	0	0	0	5	9	28	−19	0	Relegated to the 2014 Division I B

Source: IIHF
(H) Host

=== Match results ===
All times are local. (Central European Time – UTC+1)

09 December 2012; 12:00	Slovenia	0–2 (0–1, 0–1, 0–0)	Belarus	Amiens Coliseum, Amiens; Attendance: 223

Game reference
Luka Gracnar	Goalies	Yan Shelepnyov	Referee: (United Kingdom) Tom Darnell; Linesmen: (France) Matthieu Barbez (France) Thomas Caillot
0–1 / 03:06 – A. Gavrus (O. Misyul) (SH); 0–2 / 31:01 – Y. Lisovets (A. Gavrus, D. Dalidovich)			Referee: (United Kingdom) Tom Darnell; Linesmen: (France) Matthieu Barbez (France) Thomas Caillot
16 min	Penalties	10 min	Referee: (United Kingdom) Tom Darnell; Linesmen: (France) Matthieu Barbez (France) Thomas Caillot
16	Shots	51	Referee: (United Kingdom) Tom Darnell; Linesmen: (France) Matthieu Barbez (France) Thomas Caillot

09 December 2012; 15:30	Austria	1–4 (0–1, 1–1, 0–2)	Norway	Amiens Coliseum, Amiens; Attendance: 588

Game reference

David Kickert
Goalies
Steffen Soberg
Referee:
(Finland) Anssi Salonen
Linesmen:
(United Kingdom) Scott Dalgleish
(Denmark) Jacques Riisom-Birker

	0–1	14:34 – S. Weberg (M. Trettenes, Erlend Lesund) (PP)
	0–2	24:25 – A. Heier (J. Knutsen, S. Soberg) (PP)
J. Bischofberger (A. Cijan) – 27:08	1–2
	1–3	55:16 – M. Soberg (A. Heier, E. Satsten)
	1–4	55:55 – E. Salo (N. Andresen, D. Froystad)

18 min
Penalties
10 min
25
Shots
44

09 December 2012; 19:00	France	2–5 (1–1, 1–2, 0–2)	Denmark	Amiens Coliseum, Amiens; Attendance: 1,796

Game reference

Julian Barrier-Heyligen
Goalies
Sebastian Feuk
Referee:
(Slovakia) Juraj Konc
Linesmen:
(Germany) Andreas Kowert
(Italy) David Tschirner

A. Rioux (G. Leclerc) (PP) – 2:24	1–0
	1–1	06:46 – P. Rasmussen (N. Kisum, R. Knudsen)
	1–2	22:31 – Ma. Hojbjerg (Mi. Hojbjerg, B. Uldall)
	1–3	27:10 – Ma. Hojbjerg (Mi. Hojbjerg, S. Ehlers) (PP)
C. di Dio Balsamo (A. Rioux, M. Briand) – 37:18	2–3
	2–4	43:02 – T. Sondergaard (M. Eller) (SH)
	2–5	58:43 – O. Bjorkstrand (T. Spelling) (ENG)

12 min
Penalties
16 min
29
Shots
29

10 December 2012; 12:00	Belarus	2–0 (0–0, 1–0, 1–0)	Austria	Amiens Coliseum, Amiens; Attendance: 206

Game reference
Yan Shelepnyov	Goalies	David Kickert	Referee: (Slovakia) Juraj Konc; Linesmen: (France) Matthieu Barbez (France) Thomas Caillot
R. Kolenchuko (A. Gavrus, D. Ambrozheichik) – 30:46 / 1–0; R. Kolenchuko (A. Gavrus, D. Ambrozheichik) – 45:37 / 2–0			Referee: (Slovakia) Juraj Konc; Linesmen: (France) Matthieu Barbez (France) Thomas Caillot
6 min	Penalties	20 min	Referee: (Slovakia) Juraj Konc; Linesmen: (France) Matthieu Barbez (France) Thomas Caillot
38	Shots	12	Referee: (Slovakia) Juraj Konc; Linesmen: (France) Matthieu Barbez (France) Thomas Caillot

10 December 2012; 15:30	Denmark	4–3 (1–1, 2–1, 1–1)	Slovenia	Amiens Coliseum, Amiens; Attendance: 189

Game reference

Sebastian Feuk
Goalies
Luka Gracnar
Referee:
(United States) Thomas Chmielewski
Linesmen:
(Italy) David Tschirner
(Japan) Sotaro Yamaguchi

	0–1	05:32 – G. Koblar (D. Planko) (SH)
O. Bjorkstrand (Bjorn Uldall, S. Ehlers) – 19:27	1–1
	1–2	31:10 – J. Podrekar (J. Sotlar, M. Pesjak) (PP)
O. Bjorkstrand (T. Spelling, P. Madsen) – 31:20	2–2
N. Meyer (M. Bau, M. Illemann) – 37:24	3–2
T. Spelling (O. Bjorkstrand, S. Ehlers) – 44:08	4–2
	4–3	52:51 – L. Kalan (G. Koblar, N. Kozar)

8 min
Penalties
14 min
30
Shots
22

10 December 2012; 19:00	Norway	3–1 (1–1, 0–0, 2–0)	France	Amiens Coliseum, Amiens; Attendance: 1,515

Game reference

Steffen Soberg
Goalies
Antoine Bonvalot
Referee:
(United Kingdom) Tom Darnell
Linesmen:
(Germany) Andreas Kowert
(Denmark) Jacques Riisom-Birker

	0–1	09:13 – P. Crinon (M. Briand)
J. Karterud (J. Knutsen) – 19:16	1–1
A. Heier (M. Trettenes, E. Lesund) (PP) – 43:35	2–1
M. Hoff (M. Trettenes, A. Heier) (PP) – 51:27	3–1

10 min
Penalties
14 min
44
Shots
16

12 December 2012; 12:00	Denmark	8–3 (3–1, 4–1, 1–1)	Austria	Amiens Coliseum, Amiens; Attendance: 152

Game reference

Sebastian Feuk
Goalies
Phillipp Zopf
David Kickert
Referee:
(United Kingdom) Tom Darnell
Linesmen:
(Germany) Andreas Kowert
(Japan) Sotaro Yamaguchi

	0–1	01:32 – D. Ban (A. Rauchenwald)
S. Ehlers (O. Bjorkstrand, T. Spelling) – 09:11	1–1
N. Kisum (SH) – 15:41	2–1
M. Bau –(P. Russell, M. Illemann) – 19:11	3–1
S. Ehlers (O. Bjorkstrand, T. Spelling) – 22:45	4–1
Ma. Hojbjerg (T. Sondergaard, Mi. Hojbjerg) – 24:32	5–1
S. Ehlers (T. Spelling, Ma. Hojbjerg) (PP2) – 28:07	6–1
N. Meyer (T. Spelling, M. Illemann) (PP) – 31:44	7–1
	7–2	38:31 – A. Cijan (J. Bischofberger)
O. Bjorkstrand (S. Ehlers, Mi. Hojbjerg) (PP) – 50:57	8–2
	8–3	57:29 – C. Duller (L. Alexander Viveiros, A. Rauchenwald) (PP2)

12 min
Penalties
20 min
38
Shots
29

12 December 2012; 15:30	Belarus	2–4 (1–2, 0–1, 1–1)	Norway	Amiens Coliseum, Amiens; Attendance: 505

Game reference

Yan Shelepnyov
Goalies
Steffen Soberg
Referee:
(United States) Thomas Chmielewski
Linesmen:
(France) Thomas Caillot
(United Kingdom) Scott Dalgleish

	0–1	10:25 – A. Heier (E. Satsten, M. Soberg
Y. Kuntsevich (A. Zemlyankin, I. Rak) – 15:10	1–1
	1–2	15:23 – A. Heier (E. Salsten, I. Haland)
	1–3	36:30 – J. Knutsen (M. Hoff, M. Norstebo) (PP)
B. Zozon (N. Voles) – 52:13	2–3
	2–4	59:59 – J. Knutsen (J. Karterud) (ENG)

14 min
Penalties
14 min
41
Shots
29

12 December 2012; 19:00	France	0–5 (0–1, 0–1, 0–3)	Slovenia	Amiens Coliseum, Amiens; Attendance: 1,469

Game reference

Julian Barrier-Heyligen
Goalies
Luka Gracnar
Referee:
(Finland) Anssi Salonen
Linesmen:
(Denmark) Jacques Riisom-Birker
(Italy) David Tschirner

0–1	16:44 – M. Pesjak (J. Podrekar, N. Kozar)
0–2	37:31 – L. Petelin (L. Oberstar, M. Pesjak)
0–3	46:01 – G. Koblar (PS)
0–4	48:48 – N. Humar (J. Sotlar, M. Pesjak) (PP)
0–5	58:05 – N. Humar (J. Sotlar, M. Pesjak) (PP2)

24 min
Penalties
10 min
44
Shots
27

13 December 2012; 12:00	Norway	3–2 OT (1–2, 0–0, 1–0) (OT: 1–0)	Denmark	Amiens Coliseum, Amiens; Attendance: 219

Game reference

Steffen Soberg
Goalies
Sebastian Feuk
Referee:
(Slovakia) Juraj Konc
Linesmen:
(Germany) Andreas Kowert
(Italy) David Tschirner

	0–1	04:26 – P. Russel (N. Meyer)
M. Trettenes (A. Heier, M. Hoff) – 10:54	1–1
	1–2	13:25 – S. Ehlers (Mi. Hojbjerg, T. Spelling) (PP)
J. Knutsen (M. Soberg) (PP2) – 52:00	2–2
J. Karterud (M. Norstebo) – 63:23	3–2

8 min
Penalties
28 min
34
Shots
34

13 December 2012; 15:30	Slovenia	4–3 GWS (1–0, 0–3, 2–0) (OT: 0–0) (SO: 1–0)	Austria	Amiens Coliseum, Amiens; Attendance: 240

Game reference

Luka Gracnar
Goalies
David Kickert
Referee:
(Finland) Anssi Salonen
Linesmen:
(France) Matthieu Barbez
(France) Thomas Caillot

N. Truden (Z. Zupan) (PP) – 04:34	1–0
	1–1	27:07 – P. Kreuzer (A. Rauchenwald, N. Paul)
	1–2	29:42 – J. Bischofberger (K. Schettina)
	1–3	35:02 – J. Bischofberger (N. Paul)
M. Pesjak (L. Oberstar, N. Pem) – 41:01	2–3
L. Kalan (PP) – 59:41	3–3

J. Sotlar
G. Koblar
Shootout
(miss) J. Bischofberger
(miss) K. Schettina
6 min
Penalties
41 min
32
Shots
57

13 December 2012; 19:00	Belarus	9–3 (3–2, 4–1, 2–0)	France	Amiens Coliseum, Amiens; Attendance: 1,514

Game reference

Yan Shelepnyov
Sergei Stepanov
Goalies
Antooine Bonvalot
Julian Barrier-Heyligen
Referee:
(United States) Thomas Chmielewski
Linesmen:
(United Kingdom) Scott Dalgleish
(Japan) Sotaro Yamaguchi

Artur Gavrus – 00:25	1–0
	1–1	02:32 – Axel Rioux (PP)
D. Ambrozheichik (R. Kolenchukov, D. Zalamai) (PP) – 03:37	2–1
	2–2	06:52 – S. Barbero (P. Crinon)
Y. Samokhin (D. Zalamai, O. Misyul) (PP) – 18:58	3–2
	3–3	22:34 – A. Rioux (D. Thillet)
A. Gavrus (R. Kolenchukov) – 23:16	4–3
D. Dalidovich (Y. Samokhin, A. Gavrus) (PP) – 25:29	5–3
D. Zalamai (P. Kazakevich) – 28:13	6–3
I. Dunayev (A. Zemlyankin) – 39:42	7–3
A. Gavrus (Y. Lisovets, Y. Samokhin) – 46:53	8–3
I. Dunayev (D. Zalamai) – 51:30	9–3

10 min
Penalties
18 min
54
Shots
22

15 December 2012; 12:00	Norway	5–1 (1–0, 1–1, 3–0)	Slovenia	Amiens Coliseum, Amiens; Attendance: 483

Game reference

Steffen Soberg
Goalies
Luka Gracnar
Referee:
(United Kingdom) Tom Darnell
Linesmen:
(France) Matthieu Barbez
(Denmark) Jacques Riisom-Birker

A. Heier (M. Soberg, E. Salsten) – 5:40	1–0
	1–1	39:40 – L. Kalan (M. Pesjak, M. Logar) (PP)
I. Haland (J. Karterud) – 39:54	2–1
E. Salsten (A. Heier, M. Soberg) – 49:36	3–1
S. Weberg (M. Trettenes, M. Hoff) – 51:59	4–1
(PP2) J. Knutsen (M. Soberg, E. Froshaug) – 55:03	5–1

6 min
Penalties
12 min
56
Shots
17

15 December 2012; 15:30	Denmark	1–4 (0–0, 0–3, 1–1)	Belarus	Amiens Coliseum, Amiens; Attendance: 1,001

Game reference

Sebastian Feuk
George Sorensen
Goalies
Yan Shelepnyov
Referee:
(United States) Thomas Chmielewski
Linesmen:
(Germany) Andreas Kowert
(Japan) Sotaro Yamaguchi

	0–1	23:02 – A. Kalashnikov (K. Khvesyuk)
	0–2	23:56 – D. Zalamai (A. Kalashnikov)
	0–3	36:37 – R. Kolenchukov (A. Gavrus, D. Ambrozheichik)
	0–4	42:48 – A. Gavrus (R. Kolenchukov, D. Zalamai) (PP2)
O. Bjorkstrand (C. Lindhoj) – 59:55	1–4

14 min
Penalties
18 min
23
Shots
50

15 December 2012; 19:00	Austria	6–3 (3–2, 0–1, 3–0)	France	Amiens Coliseum, Amiens; Attendance: 2,017

Game reference

David Kickert
Goalies
Antoine Bonvalot
Referee:
(Slovakia) Juraj Konc
Linesmen:
(United Kingdom) Scott Dalgleish
(Italy) David Tschirner

	0–1	1:07 – A. Rioux (D. Thillet, M. Charpentier)
(PP) J. Bischofberger (C. Duller, N. Paul) – 4:04	1–1
P. Kreuzer – 7:21	2–1
	2–2	12:27 – D. Thillet (A. Rioux, G. Leclerc) (PP)
P Kreuzer (D. Ban, A. Rauchenwald) – 19:30	3–2
	3–3	12:27 – Y. Millet (N. Abramov, M. Serer)
S. Fellinger – 45:02	4–3
(PP) J. Bischofberger (S. Samardzic) – 46:24	5–3
(PP2) J. Bischofberger (N. Paul) – 55:43	6–3

10 min
Penalties
14 min
28
Shots
40

=== Statistics ===
==== Top 10 scorers ====
Pos	Player	Country	GP	G	A	Pts	+/-	PIM
1	Artur Gavrus	Belarus	5	5	5	10	+7	4
2	Andreas Heier	Norway	5	5	4	9	+4	2
3	Oliver Bjorkstrand	Denmark	5	5	3	8	+4	2
4	Sebastian Ehlers	Denmark	5	4	4	8	+3	6
5	Thomas Spelling	Denmark	5	1	7	8	+3	2
6	Johannes Bischofberger	Austria	5	6	1	7	0	0
7	Roman Kolenchukov	Belarus	5	3	4	7	+5	0
8	Miha Pesjak	Slovenia	5	2	5	7	0	0
9	Markus Soberg	Norway	5	1	6	7	+4	2
10	Jonas Knutsen	Norway	5	4	2	6	+3	0
10	Axel Rioux	France	5	4	2	6	-3	4

==== Goaltending leaders ====
(minimum 40% team's total ice time)

Pos	Player	Country	MINS	GA	Sv%	GAA	SO
1	Steffen Soberg	Norway	303:23	7	95.10	1.38	0
2	Luka Gracnar	Slovenia	303:59	14	94.12	2.76	1
3	Yan Shelepnyov	Belarus	283:14	7	92.63	1.48	2
4	David Kickert	Austria	262:27	14	91.52	3.20	0
5	Sebastian Feuk	Denmark	283:23	14	90.54	2.96	0

=== Awards ===
==== Best Players Selected by the Directorate ====
- Goaltender: (Slovenia) Luka Gracnar
- Defenceman: (Denmark) Bjorn Uldall
- Forward: (Belarus) Artur Gavrus

==== Best players of each team selected by the coaches ====
- (Austria) Alexander Cijan
- (Belarus) Artur Gavrus
- (Denmark) Sebastian Ehlers
- (France) Marius Serer
- (Norway) Steffen Soberg
- (Slovenia) Luka Gracnar

== Division I B ==
The Division I B tournament was played in Donetsk, Ukraine, from 10 to 16 December 2012.

=== Participating teams ===
Team	Qualification
Great Britain	Placed 6th in Division I A last year and were relegated.
Kazakhstan	Placed 2nd in Division I B last year.
Italy	Placed 3rd in Division I B last year.
Poland	Placed 4th in Division I B last year.
Croatia	Placed 5th in Division I B last year.
Ukraine	Hosts; placed 1st in Division II A last year and were promoted.

=== Match officials ===
Referees

- (France) Savice Fabre
- (Sweden) Linus Ohlund
- (Belarus) Vladimir Proskurov
- (Switzerland) Tobias Wehrli

Linesmen

- (Sweden) Orjan Ahlen
- (Ukraine) Andriy Bakumenko
- (Ukraine) Oleksander Govorun
- (Hungary) Balazs Kovacs
- (Slovakia) Peter Sefcik
- (Austria) Florian Widmann
- (Slovenia) Milan Zrnic

=== Final standings ===
Pos	Team	Pld	W	OTW	OTL	L	GF	GA	GD	Pts	Promotion or relegation
1	Poland	5	4	0	0	1	20	9	+11	12	Promoted to the 2014 Division I A
2	Kazakhstan	5	3	1	0	1	16	9	+7	11	
3	Italy	5	3	0	0	2	15	6	+9	9	
4	Ukraine (H)	5	2	1	1	1	8	7	+1	9	
5	Great Britain	5	1	0	1	3	8	18	−10	4	
6	Croatia	5	0	0	0	5	1	19	−18	0	Relegated to the 2014 Division II A

Source: IIHF
(H) Host

=== Match results ===
All times are local. (Eastern European Time – UTC+2)

10 December 2012; 13:00	Poland	6–3 (2–1, 3–1, 1–1)	Kazakhstan	Ice Palace Druzhba, Donetsk; Attendance: 432

Game reference

David Zabolotny
Goalies
Roman Shtefan
Valeri Sevidov
Referee:
(France) Savice Fabre
Linesmen:
(Ukraine) Andriy Bakumenko
(Slovakia) Peter Sefcik

K. Guzik (F. Starzynski, D. Zarotynski) (PP) – 00:24	1–0
	1–1	09:08 – Y. Tolepbergen (A. Likhotnikov) (PP)
F. Starzynski (A. Domogala, K. Guzik) – 11:29	2–1
	2–2	24:49 – Y. Sergienko (A. Okunev, Y. Tolepbergen)
K. Guzik (F. Starzynski, A. Domogala) – 25:42	3–2
F. Starzynski (A. Domogala, K. Guzik) – 30:54	4–2
D. Zarotynski – 35:23	5–2
	5–3	48:04 – Y. Tolepbergen (A. Okunev, S. Zinchenko)
D. Zarotynski (D. Majoch) (PP2) – 55:33	6–3

14 min
Penalties
43 min
28
Shots
34

10 December 2012; 16:30	Croatia	0–3 (0–0, 0–3, 0–0)	Italy	Ice Palace Druzhba, Donetsk; Attendance: 213

Game reference

Mate Tomljenovic
Goalies
Martin Rabanser
Referee:
(Switzerland) Tobias Wehrli
Linesmen:
(Ukraine) Oleksandr Govorun
(Hungary) Balazs Kovacs

0–1	24:53 – M. Borghi (A. Frei)
0–2	29:47 – A. Frei (M. Borghi) (PP)
0–3	39:14 – M. Stevan (A. Trivellato)

12 min
Penalties
10 min
12
Shots
43

10 December 2012; 20:00	Ukraine	2–1 GWS (0–0, 1–1, 0–0) (OT: 0–0) (SO: 1–0)	Great Britain	Ice Palace Druzhba, Donetsk; Attendance: 1,618

Game reference
Mykhailo Shevchuk	Goalies	Andrew Brummitt	Referee: (Sweden) Linus Ohlund; Linesmen: (Sweden) Orjan Ahlan (Slovenia) Milan Zrnic
M. Martyshko – 23:36 / 1–0; / 1–1 / 26:28 – A. Connolly (A. Harding, J. Watkins)			Referee: (Sweden) Linus Ohlund; Linesmen: (Sweden) Orjan Ahlan (Slovenia) Milan Zrnic
V. Zakharov; I. Pidgursky	Shootout	(miss) A. Harding; (miss) R. Venus	Referee: (Sweden) Linus Ohlund; Linesmen: (Sweden) Orjan Ahlan (Slovenia) Milan Zrnic
16 min	Penalties	6 min	Referee: (Sweden) Linus Ohlund; Linesmen: (Sweden) Orjan Ahlan (Slovenia) Milan Zrnic
35	Shots	31	Referee: (Sweden) Linus Ohlund; Linesmen: (Sweden) Orjan Ahlan (Slovenia) Milan Zrnic

12 December 2012; 13:00	Kazakhstan	5–0 (0–0, 1–0, 4–0)	Croatia	Ice Palace Druzhba, Donetsk; Attendance: 341

Game reference

Valeri Sevidov
Goalies
Mate Tomljenovic
Referee:
(Belarus) Vladimir Proskurov
Linesmen:
(Sweden) Orjan Ahlen
(Ukraine) Oleksandr Govorun

A. Kurachyov (A. Sagadeyev, N. Mikhailis) – 34:35	1–0
Y. Sergienko (S. Koshelev, K. Savitski) – 51:20	2–0
A. Kurachyov (N. Mikhailis, S. Zinchenko) – 52:18	3–0
N. Mikhailis (A. Medyanik, D. Kairov) – 57:58	4–0
A. Likhotnikov (Y. Tolepbergen, A. Okunev) – 59:29	5–0

6 min
Penalties
6 min
54
Shots
19

12 December 2012; 16:30	Great Britain	2–6 (2–1, 0–2, 0–3)	Poland	Ice Palace Druzhba, Donetsk; Attendance: 234

Game reference

Andrew Brummitt
Adam Goss
Goalies
David Zabolotny
Referee:
(Switzerland) Tobias Wehrli
Linesmen:
(Slovenia) Peter Sefcik
(Austria) Florian Widmann

J. Griffin (A. Harding) (PP) – 06:18	1–0
J. Watkins (J. Musil, P. Swindlehurst) – 10:40	2–0
	2–1	17:50 – K. Guzik (F. Starynski) (PP2)
	2–2	24:33 – R. Nalewajka (P. Huzarski)
	2–3	37:21 – A. Domogala (K. Guzik, F. Starynski) (PP)
	2–4	48:19 – L. Nalewajk (R. Nalewajka, F. Stopinski (PP)
	2–5	48:34 – M. Kalinowski
	2–6	51:11 – P. Huzarski (J. Stasiewicz)

14 min
Penalties
16 min
34
Shots
37

12 December 2012; 20:00	Italy	3–1 (0–1, 1–0, 2–0)	Ukraine	Ice Palace Druzhba, Donetsk; Attendance: 1,278

Game reference

Martin Rabanser
Goalies
Mykhailo Shevchuk
Referee:
(France) Savice Fabre
Linesmen:
(Slovakia) Peter Sefcik
(Austria) Florian Widmann

	0–1	14:28 – M. Martyshko (V. Kutsevych)
M. Borghi (M. Sullmann-Pilser, A. Frei) – 39:03	1–1
R. Andergassen (M. Marchetti) – 51:12	2–1
A. Trivellato (ENG) – 59:37	3–1

10 min
Penalties
10 min
37
Shots
17

13 December 2012; 13:00	Great Britain	4–0 (1–0, 0–0, 3–0)	Croatia	Ice Palace Druzhba, Donetsk; Attendance: 392

Game reference

Adam Goss
Goalies
Mate Tomljenovic
Referee:
(France) Savice Fabre
Linesmen:
(Sweden) Orjan Ahlen
(Ukraine) Andriy Bakumenko

L. Ferrara (A. Harding) – 02:57	1–0
J. Musil (J. Watkins) – 41:14	2–0
L. Ferrara (A. Harding, R. Venus) – 43:07	3–0
M. Selby (W. Weldon, A. Melachrino)	4–0

8 min
Penalties
6 min
40
Shots
29

13 December 2012; 16:30	Kazakhstan	2–1 (1–0, 0–0, 1–1)	Italy	Ice Palace Druzhba, Donetsk; Attendance: 248

Game reference

Valeri Sevidov
Goalies
Martin Rabanser
Referee:
(Sweden) Linus Ohlund
Linesmen:
(Ukraine) Oleksandr Govorun
(Slovenia) Milan Zrnic

A. Sagadeyev (N. Kabiev, N. Mikhailis) – 13:50	1–0
A. Sagadeyev (N. Kabiev) – 48:08	2–0
	2–1	54:23 – M. Borghi (M. Sullmann-Pilser)

6 min
Penalties
6 min
38
Shots
33

13 December 2012; 20:00	Ukraine	2–0 (0–0, 2–0, 0–0)	Poland	Ice Palace Druzhba, Donetsk; Attendance: 1,310

Game reference
Mykhailo Shevchuk	Goalies	David Zabolotny	Referee: (Belarus) Vladimir Proskurov; Linesmen: (Slovakia) Peter Sefcik (Austria) Florian Widmann
V. Kursky (R. Romashenko) – 28:18 / 1–0; O. Yanishevsky (M. Martyshko, R. Romashenko) – 37:49 / 2–0			Referee: (Belarus) Vladimir Proskurov; Linesmen: (Slovakia) Peter Sefcik (Austria) Florian Widmann
4 min	Penalties	6 min	Referee: (Belarus) Vladimir Proskurov; Linesmen: (Slovakia) Peter Sefcik (Austria) Florian Widmann
28	Shots	41	Referee: (Belarus) Vladimir Proskurov; Linesmen: (Slovakia) Peter Sefcik (Austria) Florian Widmann

15 December 2012; 13:00	Italy	6–0 (0–0, 4–0, 2–0)	Great Britain	Ice Palace Druzhba, Donetsk; Attendance: 715

Game reference

Martin Rabanser
Goalies
Adam Goss
Referee:
(Belarus) Vladimir Proskurov
Linesmen:
(Hungary) Balazs Kovacs
(Austria) Florian Widmann

M. Sulmann-Pilser (M. Borghi, A. Trivellato) – 21:09	1–0
D. Elliscasis (R. Andergassen) – 22:39	2–0
M. Castlunger (L. Frigo, M. Stevan) – 23:50	3–0
L. Frigo – 27:18	4–0
D. Maffia (L. Frigo, M. Stevan) – 54:34	5–0
D. Testori (M. Marchetti) – 58:17	6–0

10 min
Penalties
14 min
39
Shots
14

15 December 2012; 16:30	Poland	5–0 (2–0, 2–0, 1–0)	Croatia	Ice Palace Druzhba, Donetsk; Attendance: 634

Game reference

David Zabolotny
Goalies
Mate Tomljenovic
Referee:
(Sweden) Linus Ohlund
Linesmen:
(Ukraine) Oleksandr Govorun
(Slovenia) Milan Zrnic

M. Pawelski (M. Kalinowski, L. Sznotala) – 17:10	1–0
K. Guzik (A. Domogala, F. Starzynski) – 19:50	2–0
K. Guzik (L. Sznotala, F. Stazynski) – 24:44	3–0
M. Kalinowski (D. Zarotynski) (PP) – 34:21	4–0
A. Kostek (A. Domogala, L. Sznotala) (PP) – 51:26	5–0

6 min
Penalties
14 min
46
Shots
19

15 December 2012; 20:00	Kazakhstan	2–1 GWS (0–0, 1–0, 0–1) (OT: 0–0) (SO: 1–0)	Ukraine	Ice Palace Druzhba, Donetsk; Attendance: 1,794

Game reference
Valeri Sevidov	Goalies	Mykhailo Shevchuk	Referee: (Switzerland) Tobias Wehrli; Linesmen: (Sweden) Orjan Ahlen (Slovakia) Peter Sefcik
D. Fisenko (K. Savitski, Y. Sergienko) (PP) – 32:06 / 1–0; / 1–1 / 43:35 – Y. Petrangovsky (I. Pidgursky)			Referee: (Switzerland) Tobias Wehrli; Linesmen: (Sweden) Orjan Ahlen (Slovakia) Peter Sefcik
N. Mikhailis; K. Savitski; Y. Tolepbergen	Shootout	V. Zakharov; (miss) I. Pidgursky	Referee: (Switzerland) Tobias Wehrli; Linesmen: (Sweden) Orjan Ahlen (Slovakia) Peter Sefcik
2 min	Penalties	6 min	Referee: (Switzerland) Tobias Wehrli; Linesmen: (Sweden) Orjan Ahlen (Slovakia) Peter Sefcik
46	Shots	23	Referee: (Switzerland) Tobias Wehrli; Linesmen: (Sweden) Orjan Ahlen (Slovakia) Peter Sefcik

16 December 2012; 12:00	Italy	2–3 (1–0, 1–1, 0–2)	Poland	Ice Palace Druzhba, Donetsk; Attendance: 935

Game reference

Martin Rabanser
Goalies
David Zabolotnay
Referee:
(Sweden) Linus Ohlund
Linesmen:
(Hungary) Balazs Kovacs
(Slovakia) Peter Sefcik

R. Andergassen (D. Testori) – 12:16	1–0
M. Castlunger (R. Andergassen) – 34:51	2–0
	2–1	39:34 – D. Guzik (D. Zarotynski)
	2–2	43:39 – K. Guzik (A. Domgala)
	2–3	57:28 – K. Guzik (A. Domgala)

10 min
Penalties
2 min
20
Shots
32

16 December 2012; 15:30	Great Britain	1–4 (1–2, 0–0, 0–2)	Kazakhstan	Ice Palace Druzhba, Donetsk; Attendance: 614

Game reference

Adam Goss
Goalies
Valeri Sevidov
Referee:
(Belarus) Vladimir Proskurov
Linesmen:
(Sweden) Orjan Ahlen
(Ukraine) Andriy Bakumenko

	0–1	09:03 – A. Likhotnikov (Y. Tolepbergen)
A. Connolly – 09:29	1–1
	1–2	12:39 – Y. Tolepbergen (A. Likhotnikov)
	1–3	48:03 – S. Koshelev
	1–4	56:47 – A. Likhotnikov (Y. Tolepbergen)

8 min
Penalties
4 min
15
Shots
39

15 December 2012; 19:00	Croatia	1–2 (0–1, 0–0, 1–1)	Ukraine	Ice Palace Druzhba, Donetsk; Attendance: 1,971

Game reference

Mate Tomljenovic
Goalies
Mykhailo Shevchuk
Referee:
(Switzerland) Tobias Wehrli
Linesmen:
(Austria) Florian Widmann
(Slovenia) Milan Zrnic

	0–1	01:23 – R. Romashenko (S. Karpenko)
	0–2	53:57 – V. Kursky (R. Romashenko) (PP)
L. Mikulic (I. Simunovic, M. Nardin) – 55:31	1–2

14 min
Penalties
4 min
15
Shots
50

=== Statistics ===
==== Top 10 scorers ====
Pos	Player	Country	GP	G	A	Pts	+/-	PIM
1	Kacper Guzik	Poland	5	8	3	11	+7	6
2	Filip Starzynski	Poland	5	2	6	8	+6	4
3	Adam Domogala	Poland	5	1	7	8	+6	0
4	Yesmukhanbet Tolepbergen	Kazakhstan	5	3	4	7	+5	4
5	Marcello Borghi	Italy	5	3	2	5	+3	4
5	Artyom Likhotnikov	Kazakhstan	5	3	2	5	+5	4
7	Damian Zarotynski	Poland	5	2	3	5	+3	4
8	Raphael Andergassen	Italy	5	2	2	4	+3	0
9	Nikita Mikhailis	Kazakhstan	5	1	3	4	+3	0
9	Ruslan Romashenko	Ukraine	5	1	3	4	+3	0

==== Goaltending leaders ====
(minimum 40% team's total ice time)

Pos	Player	Country	MINS	GA	Sv%	GAA	SO
1	Mykhailo Shevchuk	Ukraine	309:44	6	96.47	1.16	1
2	Valeri Sevidov	Kazakhstan	272:48	5	94.95	1.10	1
3	Martin Rabanser	Italy	297:51	6	94:69	1.21	2
4	David Zabolotny	Poland	299:08	9	93:33	1.81	1
5	Mate Tomljenovic	Croatia	299:03	19	91:85	3.81	0

=== Awards ===
==== Best Players Selected by the Directorate ====
- Goaltender: (Ukraine) Mykhailo Shevchuk
- Defenceman: (Italy) Alex Trivellato
- Forward: (Poland) Kacper Guzik

==== Best players of each team selected by the coaches ====
- (Croatia) Mate Tomljenovic
- (United Kingdom) Paul Swindlehurst
- (Italy) Alex Trivellato
- (Kazakhstan) Yesmukhanbet Tolepbergen
- (Poland) Kacper Guzik
- (Ukraine) Mykhailo Shevchuk
