= Søberg =

Soberg, Søberg or Södberg may refer to:

== Patronyme ==
- Carola Söberg (born in 1982), Swedish football player
- Markus Søberg (born in 1995), Norwegian ice hockey player
- Matthew Søberg Shugart, American political scientist
- Steffen Søberg (born in 1993), Norwegian ice hockey player

== Place ==
- Søberg, Norway
