= Alex Trivellato =

Italian ice hockey player (born 1993)

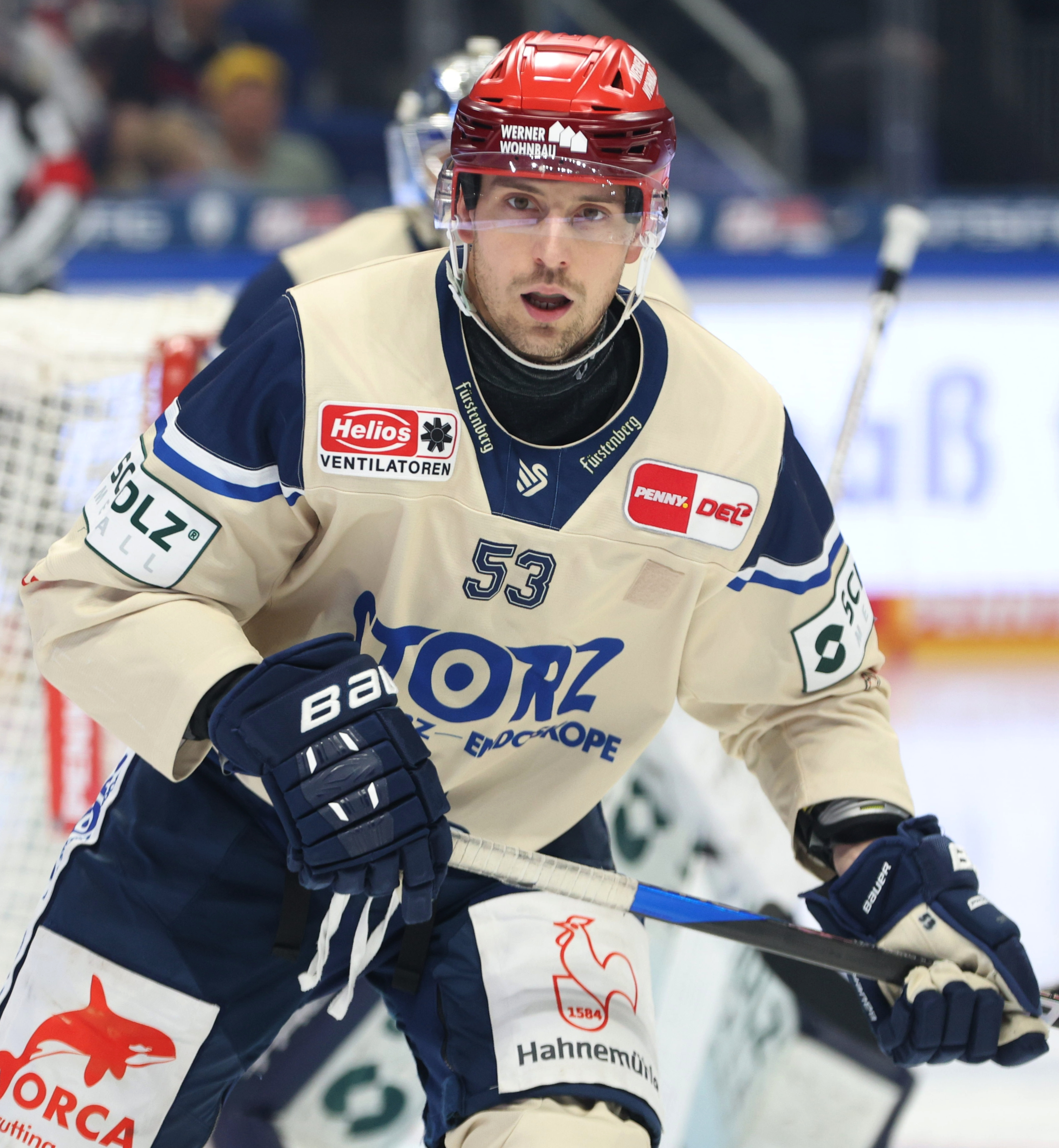
- Trivellato in 2024
- Born: 5 January 1993 (age 33) Bolzano, Italy
- Height: 6 ft 2 in (188 cm)
- Weight: 198 lb (90 kg; 14 st 2 lb)
- Position: Defence
- Shoots: Left
- DEL team Former teams: Schwenninger Wild Wings; Eisbären Berlin; Krefeld Pinguine; HC Bolzano; Västerås IK
- National team: Italy
- Playing career: 2013–present

Alex Trivellato (born 5 January 1993) is an Italian professional ice hockey player who is a defenceman for the Schwenninger Wild Wings of the Deutsche Eishockey Liga (DEL).

== Playing career ==
Trivellato spent the 2015–16 season, with the Schwenninger Wild Wings on loan from Eisbären Berlin of the DEL. In producing 9 points in 50 games with Schwenninger, he was signed to a one-year permanent deal to remain with the Wild Wings on 18 February 2016.

During his fourth year with the Krefeld Pinguine in the pandemic delayed 2020–21 season, Trivellato made 15 appearances, posting 4 points, before leaving the club and signing for the remainder of the season with Swedish second tier outfit, Västerås IK of the Allsvenskan, on 14 February 2021.

On 2 May 2022, Trivellato returned to former German club, Schwenninger Wild Wings of the DEL, agreeing to a one-year contract for the 2022–23 season.

== Career statistics ==
=== Regular season and playoffs ===
			Regular season					Playoffs
Season	Team	League	GP	G	A	Pts	PIM	GP	G	A	Pts	PIM
2007–08	Trento U19	Italy U19	12	1	1	2	6	—	—	—	—	—
2008–09	Leifers/Laives U19	Italy U19	15	2	5	7	24	3	1	0	1	8
2009–10	ESV Kaufbeuren U18	Jugend-BL	23	7	20	27	53	6	1	2	3	4
2010–11	Eisbären Juniors Berlin U18	DNL	36	4	14	18	18	6	1	3	4	0
2011–12	Eisbären Juniors Berlin U18	DNL	34	7	20	27	8	9	0	4	4	2
2012–13	FASS Berlin	Oberliga	29	6	13	19	10	10	3	3	6	0
2013–14	Eisbären Berlin	DEL	51	3	3	6	6	3	0	0	0	0
2014–15	Eisbären Berlin	DEL	35	2	3	5	18	3	0	0	0	2
2014–15	Dresdner Eislöwen	DEL2	18	2	8	10	12	—	—	—	—	—
2015–16	Schwenninger Wild Wings	DEL	50	1	8	9	18	—	—	—	—	—
2016–17	Schwenninger Wild Wings	DEL	52	2	2	4	18	—	—	—	—	—
2017–18	EC Bad Nauheim	DEL2	16	2	6	8	0	—	—	—	—	—
2017–18	Krefeld Pinguine	DEL	30	3	2	5	14	—	—	—	—	—
2018–19	Krefeld Pinguine	DEL	50	2	4	6	8	—	—	—	—	—
2019–20	Krefeld Pinguine	DEL	51	3	10	13	28	—	—	—	—	—
2020–21	Krefeld Pinguine	DEL	15	1	3	4	0	—	—	—	—	—
2020–21	HC Bolzano	ICEHL	7	1	4	5	2	—	—	—	—	—
2020–21	Västerås IK	Allsv	12	0	11	11	0	6	0	2	2	12
2021–22	HC Bolzano	ICEHL	42	4	8	12	8	2	0	0	0	0
2022–23	Schwenninger Wild Wings	DEL	55	7	8	15	16	—	—	—	—	—
2023–24	Schwenninger Wild Wings	DEL	51	7	11	18	22	7	0	1	1	2
2024–25	Schwenninger Wild Wings	DEL	47	1	15	16	12	3	0	0	0	0
2025–26	Schwenninger Wild Wings	DEL	44	3	14	17	12	6	1	1	2	4
DEL totals			531	35	83	118	172	22	1	2	3	8

=== International ===
Year	Team	Event	GP	G	A	Pts	PIM
2009	Italy U18	WJC-18 (D1)	5	0	0	0	2
2010	Italy U18	WJC-18 (D2)	5	0	1	1	0
2011	Italy U18	WJC-18 (D1)	4	0	2	2	0
2012	Italy U20	WJC-20 (D1)	5	1	2	3	4
2013	Italy U20	WJC-20 (D1)	5	1	2	3	2
2014	Italy	WC	6	0	0	0	2
2015	Italy	WC (D1A)	5	0	0	0	2
2016	Italy	WC (D1A)	5	0	0	0	0
2016	Italy	OGQ	3	0	0	0	0
2018	Italy	WC (D1A)	5	1	0	1	0
2019	Italy	WC	7	0	1	1	4
2021	Italy	WC	4	0	1	1	0
2021	Italy	OGQ	3	0	0	0	0
2022	Italy	WC	4	1	1	2	0
2023	Italy	WC (D1A)	5	1	1	2	2
2024	Italy	WC (D1A)	5	0	4	4	0
2025	Italy	WC (D1A)	5	0	2	2	0
2026	Italy	OG	4	0	0	0	0
2026	Italy	WC	7	0	1	1	4
Junior totals			24	2	7	9	8
Senior totals			68	3	11	14	14
