= Markus Søberg =

- Born: April 22, 1995 (age 31) Oslo, Norway
- Height: 6 ft 0 in (183 cm)
- Weight: 174 lb (79 kg; 12 st 6 lb)
- Position: Right wing
- Shoots: Right
- Norway team Former teams: Stavanger Oilers; Frölunda HC; Vålerenga; HK Poprad
- NHL draft: 165th overall, 2013; Columbus Blue Jackets
- Playing career: 2014–present

Markus Søberg (born 22 April 1995) is a Norwegian professional ice hockey right winger. He is currently playing for Vålerenga Ishcokey in the Norwegian Eliteserien (Norway).

He was drafted by the Columbus Blue Jackets in the sixth round (165th overall) of the 2013 NHL entry draft.

Hailing from Oslo, he is a brother of Steffen Søberg.

== Playing career ==
After playing Junior Hockey in Sweden and Canada, Søberg returned home, signing for Vålerenga midway through the 2015–16 season. Before the 2016–17 season, he was picked up by defending champions Stavanger Oilers.

== Career statistics ==
=== Regular season and playoffs ===
			Regular season					Playoffs
Season	Team	League	GP	G	A	Pts	PIM	GP	G	A	Pts	PIM
2009–10	Manglerud Star	NOR U17	8	10	8	18	14	2	2	1	3	10
2010–11	Modo Hockey	J18	10	7	7	14	18	—	—	—	—	—
2010–11	Manglerud Star	NOR U17	13	22	20	42	106	7	9	7	16	6
2010–11	Manglerud Star	NOR U19	14	21	15	36	22	3	4	0	4	4
2011–12	Frölunda HC	J18	15	19	11	30	12	—	—	—	—	—
2011–12	Frölunda HC	J18 Allsv	12	7	5	12	14	4	1	2	3	6
2011–12	Frölunda HC	J20	25	5	5	10	14	—	—	—	—	—
2012–13	Frölunda HC	J18	4	3	1	4	4	—	—	—	—	—
2012–13	Frölunda HC	J18 Allsv	3	1	0	1	6	2	3	4	7	0
2012–13	Frölunda HC	J20	36	10	16	26	20	6	5	1	6	4
2013–14	Frölunda HC	J20	45	21	17	38	40	3	1	0	1	6
2013–14	Frölunda HC	SHL	1	0	0	0	0	—	—	—	—	—
2014–15	Windsor Spitfires	OHL	61	13	17	30	26	—	—	—	—	—
2015–16	Windsor Spitfires	OHL	22	3	5	8	10	—	—	—	—	—
2015–16	Vålerenga	NOR	13	1	3	4	6	11	0	0	0	0
2016–17	Stavanger Oilers	NOR	30	13	15	28	6	12	1	4	5	4
2017–18	Stavanger Oilers	NOR	42	11	7	18	10	5	0	1	1	4
2018–19	Stavanger Oilers	NOR	48	10	20	30	32	2	0	0	0	2
2019–20	Stavanger Oilers	NOR	31	12	14	26	24	—	—	—	—	—
2020–21	Stavanger Oilers	NOR	24	6	11	17	4	—	—	—	—	—
2021–22	Stavanger Oilers	NOR	42	15	19	34	51	13	2	4	6	29
2022–23	HK Poprad	Slovak	5	0	1	1	2	—	—	—	—	—
Norway totals			230	68	89	157	133	43	3	9	12	39

=== International ===
Year	Team	Event	GP	G	A	Pts	PIM
2011	Norway	WJC18	6	1	2	3	4
2012	Norway	WJC D1A	4	0	0	0	4
2012	Norway	WJC18 D1A	5	3	5	8	4
2013	Norway	WJC D1A	5	1	5	6	2
2013	Norway	WJC18 D1A	5	8	5	13	10
2014	Norway	WJC	5	0	1	1	4
2015	Norway	WJC D1A	4	3	3	6	2
Junior totals			36	14	15	29	8
