= Erlend Lesund =

Norwegian ice hockey player

- Born: 11 December 1994 (age 30); Oslo, Norway
- Height: 6 ft 2 in (188 cm)
- Weight: 198 lb (90 kg; 14 st 2 lb)
- Position: Defence
- Shoots: Left
- SHL team Former teams: Rögle BK; Manglerud Star Ishockey; Sparta Warriors; Mora IK
- National team: Norway
- Playing career: 2010–present

Erlend Lesund (born 11 December 1994) is a Norwegian professional ice hockey player currently under contract with Rögle BK in the Swedish Hockey League (SHL) and the Norwegian national team.

Lesund played four seasons with Mora IK, including the last two in the SHL, before leaving out of contract to join fellow Swedish outfit, Rögle BK on a two-year contract on 12 April 2019.

Lesund participated at the 2017 IIHF World Championship.

== Career statistics ==
=== Regular season and playoffs ===
			Regular season					Playoffs
Season	Team	League	GP	G	A	Pts	PIM	GP	G	A	Pts	PIM
2009–10	Manglerud Star	NOR U17	34	8	17	25	38	6	3	2	5	4
2010–11	Manglerud Star	NOR U17	10	5	11	16	10	6	0	4	4	12
2010–11	Manglerud Star	NOR U19	26	6	9	15	28	4	0	1	1	6
2010–11	Manglerud Star	NOR	7	0	0	0	0	—	—	—	—	—
2010–11	Manglerud Star II	NOR.2	26	1	5	6	22	—	—	—	—	—
2011–12	Timrå IK	J18	3	0	0	0	4	—	—	—	—	—
2011–12	Timrå IK	J18 Allsv	8	1	2	3	14	3	0	0	0	0
2011–12	Timrå IK	J20	40	2	9	11	22	3	0	2	2	0
2012–13	Timrå IK	J20	42	1	3	4	48	2	0	0	0	2
2013–14	Sparta Warriors	NOR U20	2	0	2	2	0	4	0	1	1	6
2013–14	Sparta Warriors	NOR	32	2	9	11	42	5	0	1	1	2
2014–15	Sparta Warriors	NOR	35	1	14	15	46	8	0	3	3	33
2015–16	Mora IK	Allsv	36	1	6	7	64	2	0	1	1	0
2016–17	Mora IK	Allsv	46	0	11	11	30	9	0	0	0	2
2017–18	Mora IK	SHL	40	1	1	2	30	—	—	—	—	—
2018–19	Mora IK	SHL	48	0	3	3	43	—	—	—	—	—
2019–20	Rögle BK	SHL	52	1	6	7	20	—	—	—	—	—
2020–21	Rögle BK	SHL	50	3	7	10	22	14	1	4	5	34
2021–22	Rögle BK	SHL	21	0	6	6	27	—	—	—	—	—
NOR totals			74	3	23	26	88	13	0	4	4	35
SHL totals			211	5	23	28	142	14	1	4	5	34

=== International ===
Year	Team	Event	GP	G	A	Pts	PIM
2011	Norway	WJC18	6	0	0	0	10
2012	Norway	WJC18 D1A	5	1	0	1	51
2013	Norway	WJC D1A	4	0	2	2	4
2014	Norway	WJC	7	1	3	4	6
2017	Norway	WC	3	0	0	0	0
2018	Norway	OG	0	—	—	—	—
2019	Norway	WC	7	0	1	1	6
2021	Norway	WC	7	0	2	2	0
2021	Norway	OGQ	3	1	1	2	2
Junior totals			22	2	5	7	71
Senior totals			20	1	4	5	8
