= Tolepbergen =

Tolepbergen is both a surname and masculine given name of Central Asian origin. Notable people with the name include:

- Tolepbergen Qayibergenov (1929–2010), Karakalpak writer
- Yesmukhanbet Tolepbergen (born 1993), Kazakhstani ice hockey player
