= Austria men's national junior ice hockey team =

- A version of the coat of arms of Austria, with simplified eagle's feathers, is the badge used on the players jerseys.
- Association: Austrian Ice Hockey Association
- Head coach: (Canada) Jason O'Leary
- Captain: Johannes Bischofberger
- Most games: Dieter Kalt (28)
- Top scorer: Thomas Vanek (17)
- Most points: Oliver Setzinger (29)
- IIHF code: AUT

First international
- France 3 - 1 Austria (Caen, France; March 5, 1979)

Biggest win
- Austria 19 - 3 Hungary (Klagenfurt, Austria; March 7, 1980)

Biggest defeat
- Soviet Union 19 - 1 Austria (Augsburg, West Germany; December 27, 1980)

IIHF World Junior Championship
- Appearances: 47 (first in 1979)
- Best result: 8th (1981)

International record (W–L–T)
- 76-85-15

The Austrian men's national under 20 ice hockey team is the national under-20 ice hockey team in Austria. The team represents Austria at the International Ice Hockey Federation's IIHF World Junior Championship.

== History ==
Austria made its first Pool A appearance in 1981, however, after being relegated the team spent several years competing in either Pool B or Pool C. In 2000, the Austrians defeated Slovenia 6–2 to advance out of Pool C and into Division I for the 2001 World Junior Ice Hockey Championships. Austria finally qualified for the top level for 2004, by defeating Norway 6–4 in their final contest. Austria however was relegated back to Division I for 2005. The team has been unable to maintain a steady presence as part of the Top Division, their most recent appearance being in 2010. They have not won a game at the top level in four appearances, but did tie Ukraine in 2004.

== World Junior Championship record ==
Year	Rank
(France) 1979	5th in Pool B (13th overall)
(Austria) 1980	1st, Promoted to Top Division (9th overall)
(West Germany) 1981	8th place (Top Division)
(Netherlands) 1982	2nd in Pool B (10th overall)
(France) 1983	4th in Pool B (12th overall)
(France) 1984	2nd in Pool B (10th overall)
(Japan) 1985	4th in Pool B (12th overall)
(Austria) 1986	3rd in Pool B (11th overall)
(France) 1987	4th in Pool B (12th overall)
(Japan) 1988	8th in Pool B (16th overall)
(United Kingdom) 1989	1st, Promoted to Pool B (17th overall)
(West Germany) 1990	6th in Pool B (14th overall)
(Poland) 1991	7th in Pool B (15th overall)
(Poland) 1992	7th in Pool B (15th overall)
(Norway) 1993	4th in Pool B (12th overall)
(Romania) 1994	6th in Pool B (14th overall)
(France) 1995	6th in Pool B (14th overall)
(Poland) 1996	8th in Pool B (20th overall)
(Romania) 1997	5th in Pool C (23rd overall)
(Estonia) 1998	4th in Pool C (22nd overall)
(Lithuania) 1999	4th in Pool C (22nd overall)
(Japan) 2000	1st, Promoted to Division I (19th overall)
(Germany) 2001	5th in Division I (15th overall)
(Austria) 2002	2nd in Division I (12th overall)
(Slovenia) 2003	1st, Promoted to Top Division (11th overall)
(Finland) 2004	9th place (Top Division)
(United Kingdom) 2005	3rd in Division I Group A (16th overall)
(Belarus) 2006	5th in Division I Group B (22nd overall)
(Italy) 2007	2nd in Division I Group B (14th overall)
(Germany) 2008	2nd in Division I Group A (13th overall)
(Denmark) 2009	1st, Promoted to Top Division (12th overall)
(Canada) 2010	10th place (Top Division)
(Slovenia) 2011	3rd in Division I Group B (15th overall)
(Germany) 2012	5th in Division I Group A (15th overall)
(France) 2013	5th in Division I Group A (15th overall)
(Poland) 2014	4th in Division Group A (14th overall)
(Italy) 2015	5th in Division I Group A (15th overall)
(Austria) 2016	2nd in Division I Group A (12th overall)
(Germany) 2017	5th in Division I Group A (15th overall)
(France) 2018	5th in Division I Group A (15th overall)
(Germany) 2019	5th in Division I Group A (15th overall)
(Belarus) 2020	1st, Promoted to Top Division (11th overall)
(Canada) 2021	10th place (Top Division)
(Canada) 2022	10th place (Top Division)
(Canada) 2023	10th place (Top Division)
(Hungary) 2024	4th in Division I Group A (14th overall)
(Slovenia) 2025	2nd in Division I Group A (12th overall)
(Slovenia) 2026	3rd in Division I Group A (13th overall)

== Awards and honours ==
=== Directorate Awards ===
Year	Recipient	Group	Award
2014	David Kickert	Division I	Best Goaltender
