= 1993 World Ice Hockey Championships =

1993 World Ice Hockey Championships may refer to:

- 1993 Men's World Ice Hockey Championships
- 1993 World Junior Ice Hockey Championships
