= Slovenia men's national junior ice hockey team =

- Association: Ice Hockey Federation of Slovenia
- Head coach: Gorazd Drinovec
- Assistants: Gorazd Rekelj
- Captain: Gregor Koblar
- Most points: Anže Kopitar (21)
- Team colors
- IIHF code: SLO

First international
- Slovenia 4–3 Estonia (Riga, Latvia; 10 November 1992)

Biggest win
- Slovenia 30–0 Greece (Riga, Latvia; 11 November 1992)

Biggest defeat
- Kazakhstan 11–0 Slovenia (Minsk, Belarus; 4 September 1994)

IIHF World U20 Championship
- Appearances: 32 (first in 1993)
- Best result: 13th (2011)

The Slovenia men's national under 20 ice hockey team is the national under-20 ice hockey team of Slovenia. The team is controlled by the Ice Hockey Federation of Slovenia, a member of the International Ice Hockey Federation.

== History ==
Slovenia played its first game in 1992 against Estonia during the Pool C qualification tournament of the 1993 IIHF World U20 Championship. Slovenia won the game 4–3 however failed to qualify for the Group C tournament after finishing second in their group and outside of the only next round qualification spot which went to Latvia. During the same tournament Slovenia also achieved their largest win in international participation after they beat Greece 30–1. For the next two years Slovenia remained to the Pool C qualification tournament but failed to qualify in both years. However a format change for the 1995 IIHF World U20 Championship meant that Slovenia who finished last in the Pool C1 Qualification tournament moved on to the newly formed Pool C2 tournament. During this tournament Slovenia had their worst defeat in international participation after being beaten by Kazakhstan 0–11. After advancing to the Pool C2 tournament Slovenia finished second in the group standings behind Kazakhstan and gained promotion to the Pool C for the following year. Slovenia remained in Pool C until 2001 when the International Ice Hockey Federation changed the format of the World Championships and Slovenia was reseeded into the Division II tournament. During the first year of the Division II tournament at the 2001 IIHF World U20 Championship Slovenia gained promotion to Division I after defeating Japan in the final. Slovenia has continued to compete in the Division I tournament and in 2013 finished fourth in the Division I Group A tournament being held in Amiens, France.

Anze Kopitar currently holds the team record for most points with 21. Kopitar competed in three IIHF World U20 Championship for the Slovenian under-20 team from 2004 to 2006 with his best result in 2005 where he scored 10 goals and three assists in the Division I Group B tournament at the 2005 IIHF World U20 Championship.

== International competitions ==
- 1993 – 26th overall (2nd in Pool C Qualifier A)
- 1994 – 27th overall (3rd in Pool C Qualifier A)
- 1995 – 26th overall (2nd in Pool C2)
- 1996 – 20th overall (2nd in Pool C)
- 1997 – 20th overall (2nd in Pool C)
- 1998 – 21st overall (3rd in Pool C)
- 1999 – 21st overall (3rd in Pool C)
- 2000 – 20th overall (2nd in Pool C)
- 2001 – 19th overall (1st in Division II)
- 2002 – 16th overall (6th in Division I)
- 2003 – 15th overall (2nd in Division I Group B)
- 2004 – 16th overall (3rd in Division I Group A)
- 2005 – 14th overall (2nd in Division I Group B)
- 2006 – 15th overall (3rd in Division I Group A)
- 2007 – 20th overall (5th in Division I Group A)
- 2008 – 15th overall (3rd in Division I Group B)
- 2009 – 18th overall (4th in Division I Group A)
- 2010 – 16th overall (3rd in Division I Group A)
- 2011 – 13th overall (2nd in Division I Group B)
- 2012 – 14th overall (4th in Division IA)
- 2013 – 14th overall (4th in Division IA)
- 2014 – 15th overall (5th in Division IA)
- 2015 – 16th overall (6th in Division IA)
- 2016 – 21st overall (5th in Division IB)
- 2017 – 19th overall (3rd in Division IB)
- 2018 – 19th overall (3rd in Division IB)
- 2019 – 17th overall (1st in Division IB)
- 2020 – 16th overall (6th in Division IA)
- 2021 – Cancelled due to the COVID-19 pandemic
- 2022 – 18th overall (2nd in Division IB)
- 2023 – 16th overall (6th in Division IA)
- 2024 – 17th overall (1st in Division IB)
- 2025 – 14th overall (4th in Division IA)
- 2026 – 14th overall (4th in Division IA)
