= Russia men's national junior ice hockey team =

Men's national junior ice hockey team representing Russia

Russia
- Association: Ice Hockey Federation of Russia
- General manager: Alexei Kochetkov
- Head coach: Igor Larionov
- Captain: Vasily Podkolzin
- Most points: Evgeny Kuznetsov (26); Nikita Filatov (26)
- Team colors
- IIHF code: RUS
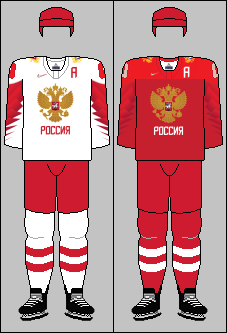

First international
- Russia 1–6 Sweden (Strakonice, Czechoslovakia; 1 September 1992)

Biggest win
- Russia 16–0 Japan (Falun, Sweden; 26 December 1992)

Biggest defeat
- Finland 11–1 Russia (Písek, Czechoslovakia; September 1992); Finland 11–1 Russia (Anjalankoski, Finland; 20 December 1992)

IIHF World U20 Championship
- Appearances: 25 (first in 1993)
- Best result: Gold: 4 – (1999, 2002, 2003, 2011)

Medal record

IIHF World U20 Championship
Gold medal – first place	1999 Canada	Team
Gold medal – first place	2002 Czech Republic	Team
Gold medal – first place	2003 Canada	Team
Gold medal – first place	2011 USA	Team
Silver medal – second place	1995 Canada	Team
Silver medal – second place	1998 Finland	Team
Silver medal – second place	2000 Sweden	Team
Silver medal – second place	2005 USA	Team
Silver medal – second place	2006 Canada	Team
Silver medal – second place	2007 Sweden	Team
Silver medal – second place	2012 Canada	Team
Silver medal – second place	2015 Canada	Team
Silver medal – second place	2016 Finland	Team
Silver medal – second place	2020 Czech Republic	Team
Bronze medal – third place	1994 Czech Republic	Team
Bronze medal – third place	1996 USA	Team
Bronze medal – third place	1997 Switzerland	Team
Bronze medal – third place	2008 Czech Republic	Team
Bronze medal – third place	2009 Canada	Team
Bronze medal – third place	2013 Russia	Team
Bronze medal – third place	2014 Sweden	Team
Bronze medal – third place	2017 Canada	Team
Bronze medal – third place	2019 Canada	Team

The Russian men's national under 20 ice hockey team is the national under-20 ice hockey team in Russia. The team represented Russia at the International Ice Hockey Federation's World Junior Hockey Championship, held annually every December and January. After the Russian invasion of Ukraine, the International Ice Hockey Federation suspended Russia from all levels of competition.

== History ==
Russia competed as an independent nation for the first time at the 1993 World Junior Ice Hockey Championships in Gävle, Sweden. Russia won their first medal, a bronze at the 1994 World Junior Ice Hockey Championships in Ostrava, Czech Republic. Russia would earn silver in 1995, bronze in 1996 and 1997, and silver in 1998 after a devastating 2–1 overtime loss to Finland. Russia won their first gold medal in 1999, after defeating Canada 3–2 in overtime.

Russia hosted the World Junior U20 Hockey Championships in Moscow. In the quarterfinal game against Sweden Russia lost 4–3. The loss resulted in head coach Pavel Vorobiev showing his frustration towards his team. Switzerland and Russia engaged in a linebrawl in a placement game the same year, in which resulted in suspensions. Russia went on to win their second gold medal against Canada in 2002. Russia lost the quarter-final game in 2004.

During the 2004–05 NHL lockout, the tournament in North Dakota had the best players, who were due to make their NHL debuts made available. Canada and Russia met up in the gold medal game, which resulted in a 6–1 win for Canada. A year later, Russia would lose gold to Canada (5–0), and again in 2007 (4–2).

Russia's Alexei Cherepanov was due to represent Russia at the 2009 World Junior Ice Hockey Championships in Canada. Cherepanov died on 13 October 2008 at the age of 19 during a Kontinental Hockey League game when he collapsed on the bench after a line change. Russia was ousted by Canada in the semi-finals and go on to would win bronze over Slovakia.

After the Russian invasion of Ukraine, the International Ice Hockey Federation suspended Russia from all levels of competition.

== World Junior Ice Hockey Championships record ==
- 1974–1991 – as Soviet Union
- 1992 – as CIS
- 1993 – 6th place
- 1994 – (bronze) Bronze
- 1995 – (silver) Silver
- 1996 – (bronze) Bronze
- 1997 – (bronze) Bronze
- 1998 – (silver) Silver
- 1999 – (gold) Gold
- 2000 – (silver) Silver
- 2001 – 7th place
- 2002 – (gold) Gold
- 2003 – (gold) Gold
- 2004 – 5th place
- 2005 – (silver) Silver
- 2006 – (silver) Silver
- 2007 – (silver) Silver
- 2008 – (bronze) Bronze
- 2009 – (bronze) Bronze
- 2010 – 6th place
- 2011 – (gold) Gold
- 2012 – (silver) Silver
- 2013 – (bronze) Bronze
- 2014 – (bronze) Bronze
- 2015 – (silver) Silver
- 2016 – (silver) Silver
- 2017 – (bronze) Bronze
- 2018 – 5th place
- 2019 – (bronze) Bronze
- 2020 – (silver) Silver
- 2021 – 4th place
- 2022 – Expelled
- 2023 – Expelled
- 2024 – Expelled
- 2025 – Expelled
- 2026 – Expelled
