= Great Britain men's national junior ice hockey team =

Great Britain
- Association: Ice Hockey UK
- Most points: Matthew Myers (31)
- Team colors: Blue, White & Red
- IIHF code: GBR

First international
- Spain 7 – 3 Great Britain (Varese, Italy; 25 March 1984)

Biggest win
- Great Britain 25 – 1 Mexico (Debrecen, Hungary; 18 December 2009)

Biggest defeat
- Latvia 16 – 2 Great Britain (Odense, Denmark; 31 December 1993)

IIHF World Junior Championship
- Appearances: 42 (first in 1984)
- Best result: 16th (2007, 2011, 2012)

International record (W–L–T)
- 66–63–7

The British men's national under 20 ice hockey team is the national under-20 ice hockey team of the United Kingdom. The team represents the United Kingdom at the International Ice Hockey Federation's IIHF World Junior Championship's Division I.

== International competitions ==
=== World Junior Championships ===
- 1984 – 22nd overall (6th in Pool C)
- 1985 – 21st overall (5th in Pool C)
- 1986 – 19th overall (3rd in Pool C)
- 1987 – 19th overall (3rd in Pool C)
- 1988 – 20th overall (4th in Pool C)
- 1989 – 20th overall (4th in Pool C)
- 1990 – 22nd overall (6th in Pool C)
- 1991 – 20th overall (4th in Pool C)
- 1992 – 19th overall (3rd in Pool C)
- 1993 – 21st overall (5th in Pool C)
- 1994 – 20th overall (4th in Pool C)
- 1995 – 24th overall (8th in Pool C1)
- 1996 – 23rd overall (5th in Pool C)
- 1997 – 22nd overall (4th in Pool C)
- 1998 – 25th overall (7th in Pool C)
- 1999 – 25th overall (7th in Pool C)
- 2000 – 21st overall (3rd in Pool C)
- 2001 – 23rd overall (5th in Division II)
- 2002 – 23rd overall (5th in Division II)
- 2003 – 25th overall (2nd in Division II, Group A)
- 2004 – 24th overall (1st in Division II, Group B)
- 2005 – 21st overall (6th in Division I, Group A)
- 2006 – 23rd overall (1st in Division II, Group A)
- 2007 – 16th overall (3rd in Division I, Group A)
- 2008 – 22nd overall (6th in Division I Group B)
- 2009 – 26th overall (2nd in Division II Group B)
- 2010 – 24th overall (1st in Division II Group A)
- 2011 – 16th overall (3rd in Division I Group A)
- 2012 – 16th overall (6th in Division IA)
- 2013 – 21st overall (5th in Division IB)
- 2014 – 22nd overall (6th in Division IB)
- 2015 – 23rd overall (1st in Division IIA)
- 2016 – 19th overall (3rd in Division IB)
- 2017 – 22nd overall (6th in Division IB)
- 2018 – 25th overall (3rd in Division IIA)
- 2019 – 25th overall (3rd in Division IIA)
- 2020 – 24th overall (2nd in Division IIA)
- 2021 –Cancelled due to the COVID-19 pandemic
- 2022 – 25th overall (3rd in Division IIA)
- 2023 – 24th overall (2nd in Division IIA)
- 2024 – 25th overall (3rd in Division IIA)
- 2025 – 26th overall (4th in Division IIA)
- 2026 – 24th overall (2nd in Division IIA)
- 2027 – (Division IIA)
