= 1993 World Junior Ice Hockey Championships =

1993 IIHF World U20 Championship

Tournament details
- Host country: Sweden
- Venue(s): 7 (in 7 host cities)
- Dates: December 26, 1992 – January 4, 1993
- Teams: 8

Final positions
- Champions: Canada (6th title)
- Runners-up: Sweden
- Third place: Czechoslovakia
- Fourth place: United States

Tournament statistics
- Games played: 28
- Goals scored: 242 (8.64 per game)
- Attendance: 36,397 (1,300 per game)
- Scoring leader(s): (Sweden) Peter Forsberg (31 points)

The 1993 World Junior Ice Hockey Championships (1993 WJHC) was the 17th edition of the Ice Hockey World Junior Championship and was held in Gävle, Sweden. Canada won the gold medal, its sixth championship, while Sweden won silver, and the combined team of the Czech Republic and Slovakia won bronze. Peter Forsberg of Sweden scored a tournament record 31 points, while teammate Markus Näslund's 13 goals also set a tournament record.

== Final standings ==
The 1993 tournament was a round-robin format, with the top three teams winning gold, silver and bronze medals respectively. As the tournament was ongoing, the nation of Czechoslovakia was dissolved into two separate nations, the Czech Republic and Slovakia, on New Years Day, 1993. The team remained unified throughout the tournament, however the Czechoslovak flag and anthem were replaced with the flag and anthem of the International Ice Hockey Federation on January 1. Meanwhile, the former Soviet Union, which had competed in 1992 as the Commonwealth of Independent States was replaced in this tournament by Russia.

Pos	Team	Pld	W	L	D	GF	GA	GD	Pts
1	Canada	7	6	1	0	37	17	+20	12
2	Sweden	7	6	1	0	53	15	+38	12
3	Czech Republic and Slovakia (Note: started championship as Czechoslovakia)	7	4	2	1	38	27	+11	9
4	United States	7	4	3	0	32	23	+9	8
5	Finland	7	3	3	1	31	20	+11	7
6	Russia	7	2	3	2	26	20	+6	6
7	Germany	7	1	6	0	16	37	−21	2
8	Japan	7	0	7	0	9	83	−74	0

Source: Hockey Canada
Notes:

Japan was relegated to Pool B for 1994.

== Results ==
December 26, 1992	Canada	3 – 0	United States	Gävle

December 26, 1992	Russia	16 – 0	Japan	Falun

December 26, 1992	Finland	5 – 2	Czechoslovakia	Bollnäs

December 26, 1992	Sweden	4 – 2	Germany	Gävle

December 27, 1992	Canada	5 – 4	Sweden	Gävle

December 27, 1992	Russia	4 – 0	Germany	Falun

December 27, 1992	Finland	7 – 0	Japan	Gävle

December 27, 1992	Czechoslovakia	6 – 5	United States	Uppsala

December 29, 1992	Canada	9 – 1	Russia	Gävle

December 29, 1992	Finland	11 – 0	Germany	Hofors

December 29, 1992	United States	12 – 2	Japan	Falun

December 29, 1992	Sweden	7 – 2	Czechoslovakia	Gävle

December 30, 1992	Canada	3 – 2	Finland	Uppsala

December 30, 1992	Czechoslovakia	1 – 1	Russia	Gävle

December 30, 1992	Sweden	20 – 1	Japan	Gävle

December 30, 1992	United States	4 – 3	Germany	Bollnäs

January 1, 1993	Canada	5 – 2	Germany	Gävle

January 1, 1993	Czech Republic and Slovakia	14 – 2	Japan	Skutskar

January 1, 1993	Finland	1 – 1	Russia	Gävle

January 1, 1993	Sweden	4 – 2	United States	Uppsala

January 2, 1993	Canada	8 – 1	Japan	Hudiksvall

January 2, 1993	Sweden	9 – 2	Finland	Gävle

January 2, 1993	Czech Republic and Slovakia	6 – 3	Germany	Uppsala

January 2, 1993	United States	4 – 2	Russia	Gävle

January 4, 1993	Czech Republic and Slovakia	7 – 4	Canada	Gävle

January 4, 1993	Germany	6 – 3	Japan	Hofors

January 4, 1993	Sweden	5 – 1	Russia	Gävle

January 4, 1993	United States	5 – 3	Finland	Gävle

=== Scoring leaders ===
Rank	Player	Country	G	A	Pts
1	Peter Forsberg	Sweden	7	24	31
2	Markus Näslund	Sweden	13	11	24
3	David Výborný	Czechoslovakia	6	9	15
4	Niklas Sundström	Sweden	10	4	14
5	Jere Lehtinen	Finland	6	8	14
6	Pat Peake	United States	4	9	13
7	Peter Ferraro	United States	7	4	11
8	Ville Peltonen	Finland	5	6	11
9	Chris Ferraro	United States	4	7	11
10	Jan Vopat	Czechoslovakia	6	4	10

=== Tournament awards ===
	IIHF Directorate Awards	Media All-Star Team
Goaltender	(Canada) Manny Legace	(Canada) Manny Legace
Defencemen	(Finland) Janne Grönvall	(Canada) Brent Tully (Sweden) Kenny Jönsson
Forwards	(Sweden) Peter Forsberg	(Canada) Paul Kariya (Sweden) Markus Näslund (Sweden) Peter Forsberg

== Pool B ==
Eight teams contested the second tier this year in Lillehammer and Hamar Norway from December 27 to January 5. It was played in a simple round robin format, each team playing seven games.

Standings

Pos	Team	Pld	W	L	D	GF	GA	GD	Pts	Switzerland men's national junior ice hockey team	Norway men's national junior ice hockey team	Italy men's national junior ice hockey team	Austria men's national junior ice hockey team	France men's national junior ice hockey team	Poland men's national junior ice hockey team	Romania men's national junior ice hockey team	Netherlands men's national junior ice hockey team
1	Switzerland	7	6	0	1	39	13	+26	13		5–4	5–1	7–1	6–4	4–2	1–1	11–0
2	Norway	7	6	1	0	49	11	+38	12	4–5		5–0	7–0	8–4	7–1	9–1	9–0
3	Italy	7	4	2	1	23	18	+5	9	1–5	0–5		3–1	6–3	0–0	7–3	6–1
4	Austria	7	4	3	0	26	23	+3	8	1–7	0–7	1–3		2–1	6–3	9–1	7–1
5	France	7	3	4	0	26	30	−4	6	4–6	4–8	3–6	1–2		4–3	5–2	5–3
6	Poland	7	1	5	1	17	28	−11	3	2–4	1–7	0–0	3–6	3–4		5–3	3–4
7	Romania	7	1	5	1	16	37	−21	3	1–1	1–9	3–7	1–9	2–5	3–5		5–1
8	Netherlands	7	1	6	0	10	46	−36	2	0–11	0–9	1–6	1–7	3–5	4–3	1–5	

Switzerland was promoted to Pool A and the Netherlands was relegated to Pool C for 1994.

== Qualification for Pool C ==
Nine countries played a qualification tournament from November 10 to 15, for a spot in the C Pool. Five teams played in Riga, Latvia while the remaining four played in Minsk Belarus, with the first place teams playing each other in Riga. Greece was the only competitor who was not making their debut.

Riga Group

Team	Pld	W	L	D	GF	GA	GD	Pts	Latvia men's national junior ice hockey team	Slovenia men's national junior ice hockey team	Estonia men's national junior ice hockey team	Croatia men's national junior ice hockey team	Greece men's national junior ice hockey team
Latvia	4	4	0	0	71	5	+66	8		2–1	12–3	10–0	47–1
Slovenia	4	3	1	0	46	6	+40	6	1–2		4–3	11–0	30–1
Estonia	4	2	2	0	46	21	+25	4	3–12	3–4		6–3	34–2
Croatia	4	1	3	0	24	27	−3	2	0–10	0–11	3–6		21–0
Greece	4	0	4	0	4	132	−128	0	1–47	1–30	2–34	0–21	

Minsk Group

Team	Pld	W	L	D	GF	GA	GD	Pts	Ukraine men's national junior ice hockey team	Kazakhstan men's national junior ice hockey team	Belarus men's national junior ice hockey team	Lithuania men's national junior ice hockey team
Ukraine	3	3	0	0	24	0	+24	6		1–0	3–0	20–0
Kazakhstan	3	2	1	0	17	1	+16	4	0–1		4–0	13–0
Belarus	3	1	2	0	19	7	+12	2	0–3	0–4		19–0
Lithuania	3	0	3	0	0	52	−52	0	0–20	0–13	0–19	

=== Qualification Game ===
November 15, 1992	Latvia	1 – 2 (0–1, 0–0, 1–1)	Ukraine	Riga

Ukraine won the right to participate in Pool C.

== Pool C ==
Eight teams were divided into two round robin groups, with placement games to follow (1st played 1st, etc.). The tournament took place from December 30 to January 3, in Odense and Esbjerg Denmark.

=== Preliminary round ===
Group A

Team	Pld	W	L	D	GF	GA	GD	Pts	Ukraine men's national junior ice hockey team	Hungary men's national junior ice hockey team	North Korea men's national junior ice hockey team	Spain men's national junior ice hockey team
Ukraine	3	3	0	0	38	3	+35	6		9–2	16–1	13–0
Hungary	3	1	1	1	15	15	0	3	2–9		5–5	8–1
North Korea	3	0	1	2	9	24	−15	2	1–16	5–5		3–3
Spain	3	0	2	1	4	24	−20	1	0–13	1–8	3–3	

Group B

Team	Pld	W	L	D	GF	GA	GD	Pts	Denmark men's national junior ice hockey team	Bulgaria men's national junior ice hockey team	Great Britain men's national junior ice hockey team	South Korea men's national junior ice hockey team
Denmark	3	2	0	1	23	10	+13	5		9–1	5–5	9–4
Bulgaria	3	1	1	1	12	17	−5	3	1–9		6–3	5–5
Great Britain	3	1	1	1	15	12	+3	3	5–5	3–6		7–1
South Korea	3	0	2	1	10	21	−11	1	4–9	5–5	1–7	

=== Placement Games ===
- 7th place:Spain 13 - 2 South Korea
- 5th place:Great Britain 4 - 2 North Korea
- 3rd place:Hungary 15 - 4 Bulgaria
- 1st Place:Ukraine 8 - 3 Denmark

Ukraine was promoted to Pool B for 1994.
