= France men's national junior ice hockey team =

France
- Association: French Ice Hockey Federation
- General manager: (France) Renaud Jacquin
- Head coach: (Canada) (France) Dany Gélinas
- Assistants: (France) Alexis Billard
- Captain: Gabin Ville
- Most points: Stéphane Da Costa (23)
- IIHF code: FRA

First international
- France 3 – 1 Austria (Caen, France; 5 March 1979)

Biggest win
- France 19 – 0 Estonia (Herisau, Switzerland; 17 December 2008)

Biggest defeat
- Canada 15 – 0 France (Hradec Králové, Czech Republic; 25 December 2001)

IIHF World Junior Championship
- Appearances: 47 (first in 1979)
- Best result: 10th (1979, 2002)

International record (W–L–T)
- 81–93–15

The French men's national under 20 ice hockey team is the national under-20 ice hockey team in France. The team represents France at the International Ice Hockey Federation's IIHF World U20 Championship's World Junior Hockey Championship Division I.

== History ==
France made their first and only appearance at the top level at the 2002 World Junior Championships, when the French team defeated the likes of Germany, Ukraine, Austria, Norway, Latvia, and Poland, all of whom would eventually or saw top division competition. France defeated Ukraine 2-1 to secure a spot among the 10 national junior teams competing at the 25th IIHF-sanctioned World Junior Hockey Championships held in Pardubice, Czech-Republic in 2001-02. France opened their first game against Canada and lost 15-0, which still stands as their largest margin of defeat. The French would never recover with losses to Russia (5-1), Finland (8-0), Switzerland (8-0). France would automatically be sent down to the relegation round with back-to-back games against Belarus. France won the first game 3-2, but would end up losing 4-2 the following game sending France packing back to Division I.

France had a powerful start to the 2003 World Junior Division I championships held in Almaty, Kazakhstan as they won their first game 10-1 against Croatia, but losses to Japan (4-2), Kazakhstan (3-0), and Ukraine (3-0) cost France their chance to return to the top level. Ukraine would go on to win the tournament and return for the first time since 2000.

Briancon, France was host to the 2004 World Junior Championships Division I. France won the opening game 4-1 over Japan, but would not recover as Belarus earned its second promotion to the top division. Since then, France has never been promoted out of Division I and nearly relegated to Division II.

Phillipe Bozon, who was the first French-born player to suit up for the NHL's St. Louis Blues was named head coach of the U20 program in 2009. France hosted the 2010 Division I championships in Megeve & Saint-Gervais, France. With Bozon appointed as head coach to replace Dave Henderson, who led the squad to the top division for 2002. Many predicted France would easily be promoted to top division for 2011, but Germany won the tournament and France was relegated to Division II for 2011.

== Results ==
- 1979 – 10th place (2nd in Pool B)
- 1980 – 15th place (7th in Pool B)
- 1981 – 16th place (8th in Pool B)
- 1982 – 13th place (5th in Pool B)
- 1983 – 13th place (5th in Pool B)
- 1984 – 14th place (6th in Pool B)
- 1985 – 16th place (8th in Pool B)
- 1986 – 17th place (1st in Pool C)
- 1987 – 13th place (5th in Pool B)
- 1988 – 13th place (5th in Pool B)
- 1989 – 14th place (6th in Pool B)
- 1990 – 13th place (5th in Pool B)
- 1991 – 11th place (3rd in Pool B)
- 1992 – 12th place (4th in Pool B)
- 1993 – 13th place (5th in Pool B)
- 1994 – 11th place (3rd in Pool B)
- 1995 – 12th place (4th in Pool B)
- 1996 – 17th place (7th in Pool B)
- 1997 – 13th place (3rd in Pool B)
- 1998 – 16th place (6th in Pool B)
- 1999 – 17th place (7th in Pool B)
- 2000 – 13th place (3rd in Pool B)
- 2001 – 11th place (1st in Division I)
- 2002 – 10th place
- 2003 – 17th place (4th in Division IA)
- 2004 – 15th place (3rd in Division IB)
- 2005 – 17th place (4th in Division IA)
- 2006 – 17th place (4th in Division IB)
- 2007 – 17th place (4th in Division IB)
- 2008 – 19th place (5th in Division IB)
- 2009 – 15th place (3rd in Division IA)
- 2010 – 21st place (6th in Division IA)
- 2011 – 24th place (1st in Division IIA)
- 2012 – 17th place (1st in Division IB)
- 2013 – 16th place (6th in Division IA)
- 2014 – 19th place (3rd in Division IB)
- 2015 – 20th place (4th in Division IB)
- 2016 – 17th place (1st in Division IB)
- 2017 – 13th place (3rd in Division IA)
- 2018 – 14th place (4th in Division IA)
- 2019 – 16th place (6th in Division IA)
- 2020 – 18th place (2nd in Division IB)
- 2021 – Cancelled due to COVID-19 pandemic
- 2022 – 17th place (1st in Division IB)
- 2023 – 13th place (3rd in Division IA)
- 2024 – 12th place (2nd in Division IA)
- 2025 – 15th place (5th in Division IA)
- 2026 – 16th place (6th in Division IA)
