= 1989 World Junior Ice Hockey Championships =

1989 IIHF World U20 Championship
Tournament details
- Host country: United States
- Venue(s): 2 (in 1 host city)
- Dates: 26 December 1988 – 4 January 1989
- Teams: 8

Final positions
- Champions: Soviet Union (8th title)
- Runner-up: Sweden
- Third place: Czechoslovakia
- Fourth place: Canada

Tournament statistics
- Games played: 28
- Goals scored: 254 (9.07 per game)
- Attendance: 45,934 (1,641 per game)
- Scoring leader(s): (United States) Jeremy Roenick (16 points)

The 1989 World Junior Ice Hockey Championships (1989 WJHC) was the 13th edition of the Ice Hockey World Junior Championship and was held in Anchorage, Alaska, United States at the Sullivan Arena. The Soviet Union won the gold medal, its eighth, and final, championship. Sweden won silver, and Czechoslovakia the bronze.

== Final standings ==
The 1989 tournament was a round-robin format, with the top three teams winning gold, silver and bronze medals respectively.

Pos	Team	Pld	W	L	D	GF	GA	GD	Pts
1	Soviet Union	7	6	1	0	51	14	+37	12
2	Sweden	7	6	1	0	39	14	+25	12
3	Czechoslovakia	7	4	2	1	36	19	+17	9
4	Canada	7	4	2	1	31	23	+8	9
5	United States	7	3	3	1	41	25	+16	7
6	Finland	7	2	4	1	29	37	−8	5
7	Norway	7	1	6	0	14	56	−42	2
8	West Germany	7	0	7	0	13	66	−53	0

Source: Hockey Canada

West Germany was relegated to Pool B for 1990.

== Results ==
26 December 1988	Canada	7 – 1	Norway	Eagle River

26 December 1988	Sweden	5 – 3	Czechoslovakia	Anchorage

26 December 1988	Soviet Union	15 – 0	West Germany	Anchorage

26 December 1988	Finland	5 – 5	United States	Anchorage

27 December 1988	Czechoslovakia	7 – 1	Norway	Anchorage

27 December 1988	Soviet Union	4 – 2	United States	Anchorage

28 December 1988	Canada	7 – 4	West Germany	Anchorage

28 December 1988	Sweden	6 – 2	Finland	Anchorage

29 December 1988	Canada	5 – 1	United States	Anchorage

29 December 1988	Soviet Union	3 – 2	Sweden	Anchorage

29 December 1988	Finland	9 – 3	Norway	Eagle River

29 December 1988	Czechoslovakia	11 – 1	West Germany	Eagle River

30 December 1988	Soviet Union	10 – 0	Norway	Anchorage

30 December 1988	United States	5 – 1	Czechoslovakia	Anchorage

31 December 1988	Sweden	5 – 4	Canada	Anchorage

31 December 1988	Finland	5 – 3	West Germany	Anchorage

1 January 1989	Canada	2 – 2	Czechoslovakia	Anchorage

1 January 1989	Soviet Union	9 – 3	Finland	Eagle River

1 January 1989	Sweden	9 – 1	Norway	Eagle River

1 January 1989	United States	15 – 3	West Germany	Anchorage

2 January 1989	Czechoslovakia	5 – 3	Soviet Union	Anchorage

2 January 1989	United States	12 – 4	Norway	Anchorage

3 January 1989	Canada	4 – 3	Finland	Anchorage

3 January 1989	Sweden	9 – 0	West Germany	Anchorage

4 January 1989	Soviet Union	7 – 2	Canada	Anchorage

4 January 1989	Norway	4 – 2	West Germany	Eagle River

4 January 1989	Czechoslovakia	7 – 2	Finland	Eagle River

4 January 1989	Sweden	3 – 1	United States	Anchorage

=== Scoring leaders ===
Rank	Player	Country	G	A	Pts
1	Jeremy Roenick	United States	8	8	16
2	Mike Modano	United States	6	9	15
3	Pavel Bure	Soviet Union	8	6	14
4	Josef Beránek	Czechoslovakia	4	9	13
5	Alexander Mogilny	Soviet Union	7	5	12
6	Sergei Fedorov	Soviet Union	4	8	12
7	Robert Cimetta	Canada	7	4	11
8	Petri Aaltonen	Finland	6	4	10
8	John Leclair	United States	6	4	10
10	Teemu Selänne	Finland	5	5	10
10	Andrei Sidorov	Soviet Union	5	5	10

=== Tournament awards ===
	IIHF Directorate Awards	Media All-Star Team
Goaltender	(Soviet Union) Alexei Ivashkin	(Soviet Union) Alexei Ivashkin
Defencemen	(Sweden) Ricard Persson	(Sweden) Ricard Persson (Czechoslovakia) Milan Tichý
Forwards	(Soviet Union) Pavel Bure	(Soviet Union) Pavel Bure (Sweden) Niklas Eriksson (United States) Jeremy Roenick

== Qualification for Pool B ==
Because Denmark had used an ineligible player in last year's Pool C, a special challenge was played with Italy (who had come second). The games were played in Canazei, Italy.

18 December 1988	Denmark	4 – 3	Italy

20 December 1988	Denmark	2 – 1	Italy

== Pool B ==
Eight teams contested the second tier this year in Chamonix, France from 19 to 28 March. It was played in a simple round robin format, each team playing seven games.

Standings

Pos	Team	Pld	W	L	D	GF	GA	GD	Pts	Poland men's national junior ice hockey team	Switzerland men's national junior ice hockey team	Romania men's national junior ice hockey team	Japan men's national junior ice hockey team	Yugoslavia men's national junior ice hockey team	France men's national junior ice hockey team	Denmark men's national junior ice hockey team	Netherlands men's national junior ice hockey team
1	Poland	7	7	0	0	49	20	+29	14		9–1	13–4	7–2	6–5	5–3	4–2	5–3
2	Switzerland	7	6	1	0	45	19	+26	12	1–9		2–0	9–5	13–1	3–1	8–1	9–2
3	Romania	7	4	3	0	32	31	+1	8	4–13	0–2		5–1	2–5	6–3	9–5	6–2
4	Japan	7	4	3	0	32	34	−2	8	2–7	5–9	1–5		8–4	6–2	5–4	5–3
5	Yugoslavia	7	4	3	0	42	40	+2	8	5–6	1–13	5–2	4–8		6–3	11–3	10–5
6	France	7	1	5	1	23	31	−8	3	3–5	1–3	3–6	2–6	3–6		4–4	7–1
7	Denmark	7	1	5	1	25	42	−17	3	2–4	1–8	5–9	4–5	3–11	4–4		6–1
8	Netherlands	7	0	7	0	17	48	−31	0	3–5	2–9	2–6	3–5	5–10	1–7	1–6	

Poland was promoted to Pool A and the Netherlands was relegated to Pool C for 1990.

== Pool C ==
This five team tournament was a round robin played in Basingstoke, Great Britain from 16 to 22 March.

Standings

Pos	Team	Pld	W	L	D	GF	GA	GD	Pts	Austria men's national junior ice hockey team	Italy men's national junior ice hockey team	North Korea men's national junior ice hockey team	Great Britain men's national junior ice hockey team	Bulgaria men's national junior ice hockey team
1	Austria	4	3	0	1	21	14	+7	7		2–2	7–5	5–2	7–5
2	Italy	4	2	0	2	22	14	+8	6	2–2		7–4	6–6	7–2
3	North Korea	4	2	2	0	17	20	−3	4	5–7	4–7		5–4	3–2
4	Great Britain	4	0	2	2	15	19	−4	2	2–5	6–6	4–5		3–3
5	Bulgaria	4	0	3	1	12	20	−8	1	5–7	2–7	2–3	3–3	

Austria was promoted to Pool B for 1990.
