= Yesmukhanbet Tolepbergen =

- Born: February 2, 1993 (age 32); Karagandy, Kazakhstan
- Height: 5 ft 11 in (180 cm)
- Weight: 165 lb (75 kg; 11 st 11 lb)
- Position: Forward
- Shoots: Right
- VHL team: Saryarka Karagandy
- National team: Kazakhstan
- NHL draft: Undrafted
- Playing career: 2011–present

Yesmukhanbet Balmaganbetuly Tolepbergen (Kazakh: Есмұханбет Балмағанбетұлы Төлепберген; born February 2, 1993) is a Kazakhstani professional ice hockey forward currently playing for the Saryarka Karagandy in the Supreme Hockey League (VHL).

== Career statistics ==
=== Regular season ===
			Regular season					Playoffs
Season	Team	League	GP	G	A	Pts	PIM	GP	G	A	Pts	PIM
2011-12	Snezhnye Barsy Astana	MHL	16	0	1	1	12	—	—	—	—	—
2012-13	Snezhnye Barsy Astana	MHL	56	10	6	16	32	—	—	—	—	—
MHL totals			72	10	7	17	44	—	—	—	—	—

=== International ===
Year	Team	Event	GP	G	A	Pts	PIM
2009	Kazakhstan Jr.	WJC U18 D1	5	0	0	0	0
2011	Kazakhstan Jr.	WJC U18 D1	4	1	3	4	2
2012	Kazakhstan Jr.	WJC D1B	5	1	0	1	4
2013	Kazakhstan Jr.	WJC D1B	5	3	4	7	0
Junior int'l totals			19	5	7	12	6
