= Poland men's national junior ice hockey team =

Poland
- Association: Polish Ice Hockey Federation
- Head coach: (Canada) David Leger
- Assistants: (Poland) Grzegorz Klich (Poland) Arkadiusz Sobecki
- Captain: Bartlomiej Jeziorski
- Most games: Michal Garbocz (21); Dariusz Lyszczarczyk (21)
- Top scorer: Aron Chmielewski (17)
- Most points: Michal Garbocz (29)
- IIHF code: POL

First international
- Canada 14 - 0 Poland (Banská Bystrica, Czechoslovakia; 23 December 1976)

Biggest win
- Poland 26 - 1 Iceland (Sosnowiec, Poland; 31 December 2003)

Biggest defeat
- Canada 18 - 3 Poland (Nitra, Czechoslovakia; 30 December 1986)

IIHF World Junior Championship
- Appearances: 47 (first in 1977)
- Best result: 5th (1987)

International record (W–L–T)
- 93–94–13

The Polish men's national junior ice hockey team is the national under-20 ice hockey team in Poland. The team represents Poland at the International Ice Hockey Federation's World Junior Hockey Championship Division I. Poland first played at the World Juniors in 1977, and throughout the 1980s moved between the Pool A and B, before dropping down in the 1990s. They last played at the top level in the 1997 World Juniors.

== International competitions ==
=== World Junior Championships ===
- 1977 – 8th overall
- 1978 – Did not participate
- 1979 – 11th overall (3rd in Pool B)
- 1980 – 10th overall (2nd in Pool B)
- 1981 – 11th overall (3rd in Pool B)
- 1982 – Did not participate
- 1983 – 11th overall (3rd in Pool B)
- 1984 – 9th overall (1st in Pool B)
- 1985 – 8th overall
- 1986 – 9th overall (1st in Pool B)
- 1987 – 5th overall
- 1988 – 8th overall
- 1989 – 9th overall (1st in Pool B)
- 1990 – 8th overall
- 1991 – 10th overall (2nd in Pool B)
- 1992 – 10th overall (2nd in Pool B)
- 1993 – 14th overall (6th in Pool B)
- 1994 – 12th overall (4th in Pool B)
- 1995 – 11th overall (3rd in Pool B)
- 1996 – 11th overall (1st in Pool B)
- 1997 – 10th overall
- 1998 – 13th overall (3rd in Pool B)
- 1999 – 12th overall (2nd in Pool B)
- 2000 – 15th overall (5th in Pool B)
- 2001 – 16th overall (6th in Division I)
- 2002 – 17th overall (7th in Division I)
- 2003 – 21st overall (6th in Division I, Group B)
- 2004 – 23rd overall (1st in Division II, Group A)
- 2005 – 17th overall (4th in Division I, Group B)
- 2006 – 18th overall (4th in Division I, Group B)
- 2007 – 18th overall (4th in Division I, Group A)
- 2008 – 18th overall (4th in Division I, Group A)
- 2009 – 20th overall (5th in Division I, Group A)
- 2010 – 22nd overall (6th in Division I, Group B)
- 2011 – 23rd overall (1st in Division II, Group B)
- 2012 – 20th overall (4th in Division IB)
- 2013 – 17th overall (1st in Division IB)
- 2014 – 16th overall (6th in Division IA)
- 2015 – 19th overall (3rd in Division IB)
- 2016 – 18th overall (2nd in Division IB)
- 2017 – 18th overall (2nd in Division IB)
- 2018 – 18th overall (2nd in Division IB)
- 2019 – 18th overall (2nd in Division IB)
- 2020 – 20th overall (4th in Division IB)
- 2021 – Cancelled due to the COVID-19 pandemic
- 2022 – 22nd overall (6th in Division IB)
- 2023 – 20th overall (4th in Division IB)
- 2024 – 21st overall (5th in Division IB)
- 2025 – 21st overall (5th in Division IB)
- 2026 – 20th overall (4th in Division IB)
