= 1994 World Junior Ice Hockey Championships =

1994 IIHF U20 World Championship
Tournament details
- Host country: Czech Republic
- Venue(s): 2 (in 2 host cities)
- Dates: December 26, 1993 – January 4, 1994
- Teams: 8

Final positions
- Champions: Canada (7th title)
- Runner-up: Sweden
- Third place: Russia
- Fourth place: Finland

Tournament statistics
- Games played: 28
- Goals scored: 195 (6.96 per game)
- Attendance: 58,143 (2,077 per game)
- Scoring leader(s): (Sweden) Niklas Sundström (11 points)

The 1994 Ice Hockey World Junior Championship (1994 WJC) was the 18th edition of the Ice Hockey World Junior Championship and was held in Ostrava and Frýdek-Místek, Czech Republic. Canada won the gold medal for the second consecutive year, and its seventh overall, while Sweden won silver, and Russia the bronze.

== Final standings ==
The 1994 tournament was a round-robin format, with the top three teams winning gold, silver and bronze medals respectively.

Pos	Team	Pld	W	L	D	GF	GA	GD	Pts
1	Canada	7	6	0	1	39	20	+19	13
2	Sweden	7	6	1	0	35	16	+19	12
3	Russia	7	5	1	1	23	17	+6	11
4	Finland	7	4	3	0	27	24	+3	8
5	Czech Republic	7	3	4	0	31	29	+2	6
6	United States	7	1	5	1	20	33	−13	3
7	Germany	7	1	6	0	10	26	−16	2
8	Switzerland	7	0	6	1	10	30	−20	1

Source: Hockey Canada

Switzerland was relegated to Pool B for 1995.

== Results ==
December 26, 1993	Canada	5 – 1	Switzerland	Frýdek-Místek

December 26, 1993	Sweden	4 – 1	Germany	Ostrava

December 26, 1993	Russia	5 – 1	Czech Republic	Ostrava

December 26, 1993	Finland	5 – 2	United States	Frýdek-Místek

December 27, 1993	Canada	5 – 2	Germany	Ostrava

December 27, 1993	Sweden	3 – 0	Russia	Ostrava

December 27, 1993	Finland	7 – 3	Czech Republic	Frýdek-Místek

December 27, 1993	Switzerland	1 – 1	United States	Frýdek-Místek

December 29, 1993	Canada	3 – 3	Russia	Frýdek-Místek

December 29, 1993	Czech Republic	6 – 0	Switzerland	Frýdek-Místek

December 29, 1993	Sweden	6 – 2	Finland	Ostrava

December 29, 1993	United States	7 – 2	Germany	Ostrava

December 30, 1993	Canada	6 – 3	Finland	Ostrava

December 30, 1993	Czech Republic	6 – 2	Germany	Ostrava

December 30, 1993	Sweden	6 – 2	Switzerland	Frýdek-Místek

December 30, 1993	Russia	4 – 3	United States	Frýdek-Místek

January 1, 1994	Canada	8 – 3	United States	Frýdek-Místek

January 1, 1994	Finland	4 – 2	Switzerland	Ostrava

January 1, 1994	Sweden	6 – 4	Czech Republic	Frýdek-Místek

January 1, 1994	Russia	1 – 0	Germany	Ostrava

January 2, 1994	Canada	6 – 4	Czech Republic	Ostrava

January 2, 1994	Finland	2 – 0	Germany	Frýdek-Místek

January 2, 1994	Russia	5 – 3	Switzerland	Frýdek-Místek

January 2, 1994	Sweden	6 – 1	United States	Ostrava

January 4, 1994	Canada	6 – 4	Sweden	Ostrava

January 4, 1994	Germany	3 – 1	Switzerland	Ostrava

January 4, 1994	Russia	5 – 4	Finland	Frýdek-Místek

January 4, 1994	Czech Republic	7 – 3	United States	Frýdek-Místek

=== Scoring leaders ===
Rank	Player	Country	G	A	Pts
1	Niklas Sundström	Sweden	4	7	11
2	Martin Gendron	Canada	6	4	10
3	Yanick Dubé	Canada	5	5	10
4	Rick Girard	Canada	6	3	9
5	Mats Lindgren	Sweden	5	4	9
6	Jason Allison	Canada	3	6	9
6	Saku Koivu	Finland	3	6	9
8	Petr Sýkora	Czech Republic	6	2	8
9	Valeri Bure	Russia	5	3	8
10	Kenny Jönsson	Sweden	3	5	8

=== Tournament awards ===
	IIHF Directorate Awards	Media All-Star Team
Goaltender	(Canada) Jamie Storr	(Russia) Evgeni Ryabchikov
Defencemen	(Sweden) Kenny Jönsson	(Finland) Kimmo Timonen (Sweden) Kenny Jönsson
Forwards	(Sweden) Niklas Sundström	(Sweden) Niklas Sundström (Russia) Valeri Bure (Czech Republic) David Výborný

== Pool B ==
Eight teams contested the second tier this year in Bucharest, Romania from December 27 to January 5. It was played in a simple round robin format, each team playing seven games.

Standings

Pos	Team	Pld	W	L	D	GF	GA	GD	Pts	Ukraine men's national junior ice hockey team	Norway men's national junior ice hockey team	France men's national junior ice hockey team	Poland men's national junior ice hockey team	Italy men's national junior ice hockey team	Austria men's national junior ice hockey team	Japan men's national junior ice hockey team	Romania men's national junior ice hockey team
1	Ukraine	7	7	0	0	35	10	+25	14		4–3	5–1	7–0	2–1	5–2	3–0	9–3
2	Norway	7	5	1	1	28	15	+13	11	3–4		6–2	4–1	3–2	6–2	3–1	3–3
3	France	7	3	3	1	23	23	0	7	1–5	2–6		1–3	5–2	4–4	3–1	7–2
4	Poland	7	3	4	0	15	26	−11	6	0–7	1–4	3–1		3–0	2–4	5–4	1–6
5	Italy	7	2	4	1	20	22	−2	5	1–2	2–3	2–5	0–3		3–3	7–5	5–1
6	Austria	7	1	3	3	21	27	−6	5	2–5	2–6	4–4	4–2	3–3		3–4	3–3
7	Japan	7	2	5	0	19	27	−8	4	0–3	1–3	1–3	4–5	5–7	4–3		4–3
8	Romania	7	1	4	2	21	32	−11	4	3–9	3–3	2–7	6–1	1–5	3–3	3–4	

Ukraine was promoted to Pool A and Romania was relegated to Pool C for 1995.

== Qualification for Pool C ==
A Qualification tournament was played in Nitra and Nové Zámky, Slovakia, from November 1 to 7. Games between teams that had played each other in the preliminary round carried forward and counted in the final round.

=== Preliminary round ===
Group A

Team	Pld	W	L	D	GF	GA	GD	Pts	Latvia men's national junior ice hockey team	Belarus men's national junior ice hockey team	Slovenia men's national junior ice hockey team	Estonia men's national junior ice hockey team
Latvia	3	3	0	0	15	10	+5	6		2–1	9–1	13–1
Belarus	3	2	1	0	22	11	+11	4	1–2		6–0	6–1
Slovenia	3	1	2	0	19	17	+2	2	1–9	0–6		5–1
Estonia	3	0	3	0	9	27	−18	0	1–13	1–6	1–5	

Group B

Team	Pld	W	L	D	GF	GA	GD	Pts	Slovakia men's national junior ice hockey team	Kazakhstan men's national junior ice hockey team	Croatia men's national junior ice hockey team
Slovakia	2	2	0	0	21	4	+17	4		6–4	15–0
Kazakhstan	2	1	1	0	16	7	+9	2	4–6		12–1
Croatia	2	0	2	0	1	27	−26	0	0–15	1–12	

=== Final Round ===
Group A

Team	Pld	W	L	D	GF	GA	GD	Pts	Latvia men's national junior ice hockey team	Slovakia men's national junior ice hockey team	Kazakhstan men's national junior ice hockey team	Belarus men's national junior ice hockey team
Latvia	3	2	1	0	8	7	+1	4		4–3	2–3	2–1
Slovakia	3	2	1	0	16	10	+6	4	3–4		6–4	7–2
Kazakhstan	3	1	1	1	9	10	−1	3	3–2	4–6		2–2
Belarus	3	0	2	1	5	11	−6	1	1–2	2–7	2–2	

Latvia and Slovakia won the right to participate in Pool C.

== Pool C ==
Eight teams were divided into two round robin groups, with placement games to follow (1st played 1st, etc.). The tournament took place from December 30 to January 3, in Odense and Esbjerg, Denmark.

=== Preliminary round ===
Group A

Team	Pld	W	L	D	GF	GA	GD	Pts	Latvia men's national junior ice hockey team	Great Britain men's national junior ice hockey team	Netherlands men's national junior ice hockey team	Bulgaria men's national junior ice hockey team
Latvia	3	3	0	0	55	3	+52	6		16–2	14–0	25–1
Great Britain	3	2	1	0	16	22	−6	4	2–16		6–1	8–5
Netherlands	3	1	2	0	6	22	−16	2	0–14	1–6		5–2
Bulgaria	3	0	3	0	8	38	−30	0	1–25	5–8	2–5	

Group B

Team	Pld	W	L	D	GF	GA	GD	Pts	Slovakia men's national junior ice hockey team	Denmark men's national junior ice hockey team	Hungary men's national junior ice hockey team	Spain men's national junior ice hockey team
Slovakia	3	3	0	0	49	1	+48	6		22–0	12–1	15–0
Denmark	3	2	1	0	9	26	−17	4	0–22		5–4	4–0
Hungary	3	1	2	0	15	17	−2	2	1–12	4–5		10–0
Spain	3	0	3	0	0	29	−29	0	0–15	0–4	0–10	

=== Placement Games ===
- 7th place:Spain 7 - 2 Bulgaria
- 5th place:Hungary 11 - 1 Netherlands
- 3rd place:Denmark 6 - 5 Great Britain
- 1st Place:Slovakia 6 - 2 Latvia

Slovakia was promoted to Pool B for 1995.
