= Daniel Maffia =

French-American visual artist (born 1937)

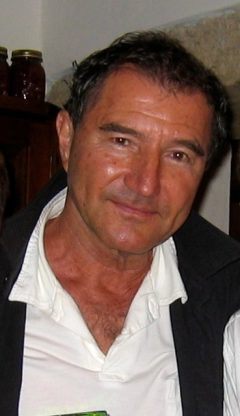
- Born: 25 June 1937 (age 89); Nevers, France
- Education: Pratt Institute
- Known for: Visual arts

Daniel Maffia (born June 25, 1937) is a French-American visual artist best known for his paintings.

== Biography ==
Born in Nevers, France, Maffia's family moved to Brooklyn when he was 12. After graduating with a Master of Fine Arts from Pratt Institute in 1961, Maffia cultivated a reputation in New York as an illustrative painter, his work often commissioned for use on the covers of such publications as Time, Rolling Stone, New York, Esquire, and Mother Jones. His most recognizable illustration is the portrait of John Lennon on the December 22, 1980 cover of Time magazine, following Lennon's murder. Other clients included the New York Times, The New Yorker, Atlantic Monthly, Random House, Harper & Row, and the US Department of the Interior, for whom Maffia illustrated a book about George Washington.

While best known for his illustrative portraits, Maffia also blends the styles of impressionism and realism, focusing on a wide variety of subject matter including nature, landscape, pop culture, and darker themes such as "good and evil".

Maffia's illustration of John Lennon for Time

Throughout his time in New York, Maffia taught classes at his alma mater, Pratt Institute, as well as Parsons School of Design, Rutgers University, and Sarah Lawrence College.

Daniel and his wife, Mary, split their time between their homes in Hingham, Massachusetts, and Joucas, France. Since the 1990s, Maffia's focus has been on fine art; he continues to paint year-round from his studios in both residences.
