= Italy men's national junior ice hockey team =

Italy
- Association: Italian Ice Sports Federation
- Head coach: (Italy) Fabio Polloni
- Captain: Luca Frigo
- Most points: Markus Brunner (23)
- Team colors
- IIHF code: ITA

First international
- Denmark 3–0 Italy (Caen, France; 5 March 1979)

Biggest win
- Italy 21–1 Greece (Belgrade, Yugoslavia; 30 December 1990)

Biggest defeat
- Italy 0–15 West Germany (Italy; 20 December 1982)

IIHF World Junior Championship
- Appearances: 47 (first in 1979)
- Best result: 11th (1993)

International record (W–L–T)
- 70–95–18

The Italian men's national under 20 ice hockey team is the national under-20 ice hockey team in Italy. The team represents Italy at the International Ice Hockey Federation's IIHF World Junior Championship.

== International competitions ==
- 1979 – 15th overall (7th in Pool B)
- 1980 – 14th overall (6th in Pool B)
- 1981 – 15th overall (7th in Pool B)
- 1982 – 14th overall (6th in Pool B)
- 1983 – 16th overall (8th in Pool B)
- 1984 – 17th overall (1st in Pool C)
- 1985 – 14th overall (6th in Pool B)
- 1986 – 15th overall (7th in Pool B)
- 1987 – 16th overall (8th in Pool B)
- 1988 – 18th overall (2nd in Pool C)
- 1989 – 18th overall (2nd in Pool C)
- 1990 – 19th overall (3rd in Pool C)
- 1991 – 18th overall (2nd in Pool C)
- 1992 – 17th overall (1st in Pool C)
- 1993 – 11th overall (3rd in Pool B)
- 1994 – 13th overall (5th in Pool B)
- 1995 – 16th overall (8th in Pool B)
- 1996 – 15th overall (5th in Pool B)
- 1997 – 18th overall (8th in Pool B)
- 1998 – 20th overall (2nd in Pool C)
- 1999 – 19th overall (1st in Pool C)
- 2000 – 16th overall (6th in Pool B)
- 2001 – 17th overall (7th in Division I)
- 2002 – 18th overall (8th in Division I)
- 2003 – 20th overall (5th in Division IA)
- 2004 – 18th overall (4th in Division IB)
- 2005 – 20th overall (5th in Division IA)
- 2006 – 16th overall (3rd in Division IB)
- 2007 – 21st overall (6th in Division IB)
- 2008 – 23rd overall (1st in Division IIA)
- 2009 – 17th overall (4th in Division IB)
- 2010 – 15th overall (3rd in Division IB)
- 2011 – 17th overall (4th in Division IA)
- 2012 – 19th overall (3rd in Division IB)
- 2013 – 19th overall (3rd in Division IB)
- 2014 – 17th overall (1st in Division IB)
- 2015 – 14th overall (4th in Division IA)
- 2016 – 16th overall (6th in Division IA)
- 2017 – 20th overall (4th in Division IB)
- 2018 – 21st overall (5th in Division IB)
- 2019 – 20th overall (4th in Division IB)
- 2020 – 22nd overall (6th in Division IB)
- 2021 – Cancelled due to the COVID-19 pandemic
- 2022 – 23rd overall (1st in Division IIA)
- 2023 – 19th overall (3rd in Division IB)
- 2024 – 19th overall (3rd in Division IB)
- 2025 – 19th overall (3rd in Division IB)
- 2026 – 22nd overall (6th in Division IB)
