= 2012 World Junior Ice Hockey Championships – Division I =

International ice hockey tournament

2012 IIHF U20 World Championship Division I

Tournament details
- Host countries: Germany; Poland
- Venues: 2 (in 2 host cities)
- Dates: 11–17 December 2011; 12–18 December 2011
- Teams: 12

The 2012 World Junior Ice Hockey Championship Division I was a pair of international ice hockey tournaments organized by the International Ice Hockey Federation. In 2012, a new format was introduced to the IIHF World Junior Championships, making Division I A and Division I B now represent the second and third tiers of the IIHF World Junior Championship. Division I was played in two groups of six teams each. In each group, the first-place team was promoted to a higher division, while the last-place team was relegated to a lower division. That year, for the first time, the winner of Group B was promoted to Group A, and the winner of Group A advanced to the following year's Top Division. Previously, the winners of both groups were promoted directly to the Top Division.

== Division I A ==
The Division I A tournament was played in Garmisch-Partenkirchen, Germany, from 11 to 17 December 2011.

=== Participating teams ===
Team	Qualification
Norway	Placed 9th in Top Division last year and were relegated.
Germany	Hosts; placed 10th in Top Division last year and were relegated.
Belarus	Placed 2nd in Division I (Group A) last year.
Slovenia	Placed 2nd in Division I (Group B) last year.
Great Britain	Placed 3rd in Division I (Group A) last year.
Austria	Placed 3rd in Division I (Group B) last year.

=== Final standings ===
Pos	Team	Pld	W	OTW	OTL	L	GF	GA	GD	Pts	Promotion or relegation
1	Germany (H)	5	5	0	0	0	34	9	+25	15	Promoted to the 2013 Top Division
2	Belarus	5	3	0	1	1	21	10	+11	10	
3	Norway	5	3	0	0	2	19	13	+6	9	
4	Slovenia	5	1	2	0	2	16	12	+4	7	
5	Austria	5	1	0	1	3	11	26	−15	4	
6	Great Britain	5	0	0	0	5	6	37	−31	0	Relegated to the 2013 Division I B

Source: IIHF
(H) Host

=== Match results ===
All times are local. (Central European Time – UTC+1)

11 December 2011; 12:30	Great Britain	2–5 (2–2, 0–1, 0–2)	Norway	Garmisch Olympia Stadium, Garmisch-Partenkirchen

Game reference

11 December 2011; 16:00	Belarus	1–2 (0–0, 0–1, 1–1)	Germany	Garmisch Olympia Stadium, Garmisch-Partenkirchen

Game reference

11 December 2011; 19:30	Austria	2–3 (GWS) (1–0, 1–2, 0–0) (0–0, 0–1)	Slovenia	Garmisch Olympia Stadium, Garmisch-Partenkirchen

Game reference

12 December 2011; 15:30	Slovenia	8–0 (6–0, 1–0, 1–0)	Great Britain	Garmisch Olympia Stadium, Garmisch-Partenkirchen

Game reference

12 December 2011; 19:00	Germany	11–2 (3–0, 6–1, 2–1)	Austria	Garmisch Olympia Stadium, Garmisch-Partenkirchen

Game reference

13 December 2011; 17:00	Norway	2–3 (0–1, 1–0, 1–2)	Belarus	Garmisch Olympia Stadium, Garmisch-Partenkirchen

Game reference

14 December 2011; 12:30	Great Britain	2–10 (0–2, 0–6, 2–2)	Belarus	Garmisch Olympia Stadium, Garmisch-Partenkirchen

Game reference

14 December 2011; 16:00	Norway	5–2 (3–0, 0–2, 2–0)	Austria	Garmisch Olympia Stadium, Garmisch-Partenkirchen

Game reference

14 December 2011; 19:30	Germany	5–2 (2–2, 0–0, 3–0)	Slovenia	Garmisch Olympia Stadium, Garmisch-Partenkirchen

Game reference

15 December 2011; 19:00	Germany	11–1 (4–0, 3–0, 4–1)	Great Britain	Garmisch Olympia Stadium, Garmisch-Partenkirchen

Game reference

16 December 2011; 15:30	Belarus	6–2 (3–1, 1–1, 2–0)	Austria	Garmisch Olympia Stadium, Garmisch-Partenkirchen

Game reference

16 December 2011; 19:00	Slovenia	1–4 (1–1, 0–2, 0–1)	Norway	Garmisch Olympia Stadium, Garmisch-Partenkirchen

Game reference

17 December 2011; 12:30	Austria	3–1 (0–0, 1–1, 2–0)	Great Britain	Garmisch Olympia Stadium, Garmisch-Partenkirchen

Game reference

17 December 2011; 16:00	Slovenia	2–1 (GWS) (1–1, 0–0, 0–0) (0–0, 1–0)	Belarus	Garmisch Olympia Stadium, Garmisch-Partenkirchen

Game reference

17 December 2011; 19:30	Norway	3–5 (0–1, 1–1, 2–3)	Germany	Garmisch Olympia Stadium, Garmisch-Partenkirchen

Game reference

=== Statistics ===
==== Top 10 scorers ====
Pos	Player	Country	GP	G	A	Pts	+/-	PIM
1	Tobias Rieder	Germany	5	5	8	13	+6	4
2	David Elsner	Germany	5	4	5	9	+6	8
3	Marcel Noebels	Germany	5	4	5	9	+5	6
4	Sondre Olden	Norway	5	2	6	8	+4	2
5	Jonas Knutsen	Norway	5	5	2	7	+4	6
6	Gal Koren	Slovenia	5	4	3	7	0	0
7	Bernhard Keil	Germany	5	2	5	7	+5	14
7	Patrick Obrist	Austria	5	2	5	7	+1	2
9	Konrad Abeltshauser	Germany	5	1	6	7	+10	4
10	Leo Pföderl	Germany	5	3	3	6	+5	0

==== Goaltending leaders ====
(minimum 40% team's total ice time)

Pos	Player	Country	MINS	GA	Sv%	GAA	SO
1	Yan Shelepnyov	Belarus	284:21	8	92.73	1.69	0
2	Mathias Niederberger	Germany	260:00	7	92.13	1.62	0
3	Luka Gračnar	Slovenia	269:45	11	91.47	2.45	0
4	Lars Volden	Norway	300:00	13	91.10	2.60	0
5	Declan Ryan	Great Britain	192:15	22	82.95	6.87	0

==== IIHF Best Players awards ====
- Goaltender: (Germany) Mathias Niederberger
- Defenceman: (Germany) Konrad Abeltshauser
- Forward: (Norway) Sondre Olden

== Division I B ==
The Division I B tournament was played in Tychy, Poland, from 12 to 18 December 2011.

=== Participating teams ===
Team	Qualification
Italy	Placed 4th in Division I (Group A) last year.
Kazakhstan	Placed 4th in Division I (Group B) last year.
Japan	Placed 5th in Division I (Group A) last year.
Croatia	Placed 5th in Division I (Group B) last year.
France	Placed 1st in Division II (Group A) last year and were promoted.
Poland	Hosts; placed 1st in Division II (Group B) last year and were promoted.

=== Final standings ===
Pos	Team	Pld	W	OTW	OTL	L	GF	GA	GD	Pts	Promotion or relegation
1	France	5	4	0	0	1	19	6	+13	12	Promoted to the 2013 Division I A
2	Kazakhstan	5	3	0	1	1	9	7	+2	10	
3	Italy	5	2	1	0	2	14	9	+5	8	
4	Poland (H)	5	2	0	1	2	16	12	+4	7	
5	Croatia	5	2	0	0	3	12	25	−13	6	
6	Japan	5	0	1	0	4	9	20	−11	2	Relegated to the 2013 Division II A

Source: IIHF
(H) Host

=== Match results ===
All times are local. (Central European Time – UTC+1)

12 December 2011; 13:00	France	2–1 (1–0, 0–1, 1–0)	Italy	Winter Stadium, Tychy

Game reference

12 December 2011; 16:30	Japan	1–2 (0–1, 1–0, 0–1)	Kazakhstan	Winter Stadium, Tychy

Game reference

12 December 2011; 20:00	Poland	9–1 (3–0, 4–1, 2–0)	Croatia	Winter Stadium, Tychy

Game reference

13 December 2011; 13:00	Italy	7–2 (3–1, 4–0, 0–1)	Japan	Winter Stadium, Tychy

Game reference

13 December 2011; 16:30	Croatia	1–8 (1–0, 0–4, 0–4)	France	Winter Stadium, Tychy

Game reference

13 December 2011; 20:00	Kazakhstan	2–0 (1–0, 0–0, 1–0)	Poland	Winter Stadium, Tychy

Game reference

15 December 2011; 13:00	France	5–0 (1–0, 2–0, 2–0)	Japan	Winter Stadium, Tychy

Game reference

15 December 2011; 16:30	Kazakhstan	4–3 (2–1, 1–2, 1–0)	Croatia	Winter Stadium, Tychy

Game reference

15 December 2011; 20:00	Italy	4–2 (2–0, 1–1, 1–1)	Poland	Winter Stadium, Tychy

Game reference

16 December 2011; 13:00	Kazakhstan	1–2 (0–0, 1–1, 0–1)	France	Winter Stadium, Tychy

Game reference

16 December 2011; 16:30	Croatia	3–1 (2–1, 1–0, 0–0)	Italy	Winter Stadium, Tychy

Game reference

16 December 2011; 20:00	Japan	3–2 (OT) (1–0, 1–1, 0–1) (1–0)	Poland	Winter Stadium, Tychy

Game reference

18 December 2011; 13:00	Croatia	4–3 (0–0, 3–2, 1–1)	Japan	Winter Stadium, Tychy

Game reference

18 December 2011; 16:30	Italy	1–0 (OT) (0–0, 0–0, 0–0) (1–0)	Kazakhstan	Winter Stadium, Tychy

Game reference

18 December 2010; 20:00	Poland	3–2 (1–0, 1–1, 1–1)	France	Winter Stadium, Tychy

Game reference

=== Statistics ===
==== Top 10 scorers ====
Pos	Player	Country	GP	G	A	Pts	+/-	PIM
1	Damian Kapica	Poland	5	6	4	10	+10	0
2	Mateusz Michalski	Poland	5	2	7	9	+9	0
3	Kamil Kalinowski	Poland	5	3	4	7	+5	2
3	Borna Rendulic	Croatia	5	3	4	7	-2	0
5	Norbert Abramov	France	5	4	2	6	+6	4
6	Petar Trstenjak	Croatia	5	1	5	6	-5	2
7	Igor Lazic	Croatia	5	3	2	5	-3	6
8	Dimitri Thillet	France	5	2	3	5	+6	2
9	Makuru Fukuhashi	Japan	5	3	1	4	+4	0
9	Nicolas Ritz	France	5	3	1	4	+6	20

==== Goaltending leaders ====
(minimum 40% team's total ice time)

Pos	Player	Country	MINS	GA	Sv%	GAA	SO
1	Julian Barrier-Heyligen	France	240:00	3	96.34	0.75	1
2	Pavel Poluektov	Kazakhstan	304:49	7	94.66	1.38	1
3	Massimo Quagliato	Italy	304:29	9	93.28	1.77	1
4	Takuto Onoda	Japan	178:23	8	91.67	2.69	0
5	Mariusz Ryszkaniec	Poland	180:00	7	91.57	2.33	0

==== IIHF Best Players awards ====
- Goaltender: (Kazakhstan) Pavel Poluektov
- Defenceman: (France) Aziz Baazzi
- Forward: (Croatia) Borna Rendulic
