= Adam Harding =

Welsh ice hockey player (born 1993)

- Born: 3 January 1993 (age 32) Cardiff, Wales
- Height: 6 ft 0 in (183 cm)
- Weight: 186.3 lb (85 kg; 13 st 4 lb)
- Position: Forward
- Shoots: Right
- NIHL team Former teams: Telford Tigers; Cardiff Devils; Manchester Storm; Dundee Stars; Swindon Wildcats; Basingstoke Bison
- Playing career: 2011–present

Adam Harding (born 3 January 1993) is a Welsh professional ice hockey player currently playing for Telford Tigers, who he joined in 2024.

Harding previously played for EIHL sides Cardiff Devils, Manchester Storm, and Dundee Stars and was briefly contracted to Milton Keynes Lightning in the 2018 off-season before opting to move to Swindon.

After nearly four years with Basingstoke Bison, Harding moved to fellow NIHL side Bristol Pitbulls ahead of the 2022–23 season - joining as player/assistant coach. Moving on to Telford Tigers in 2024 for the 24/25 season.
