= Alexander Cijan =

Austrian professional ice hockey forward

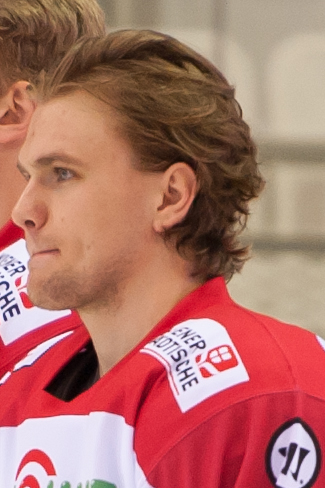
- Born: 16 May 1994 (age 31) Klagenfurt, Austria
- Height: 5 ft 11 in (180 cm)
- Weight: 185 lb (84 kg; 13 st 3 lb)
- Position: Forward
- Shot: Left
- Played for: Mora IK; EC Red Bull Salzburg; EHC Black Wings Linz; Vienna Capitals
- National team: Austria
- Playing career: 2013–2021

Alexander Cijan (born 16 May 1994) is an Austrian former professional ice hockey forward who played in the ICE Hockey League (ICEHL).

== Playing career ==
Cijan returned to his native Austrian, joining EC Red Bull Salzburg after making his professional debut with Swedish club, Mora IK of the HockeyAllsvenskan, on 16 April 2014.

After six seasons within EC Red Bull Salzburg, Cijan left as a free agent following the 2018–19 season. He signed a one-year contract with fellow EBEL club, EHC Black Wings Linz on 19 April 2019.

== International play ==
He participated with Austrian national team at the 2015 IIHF World Championships.
