= Coliséum =

Sports complex in Amiens, France

Coordinates: 49.8937°N 2.2895°E

- Interactive map of Coliséum
- Location: 27 Rue Caumartin; 80000 Amiens France
- Capacity: Hockey: 2,882

Construction
- Opened: 5 Jan 1996
- Cost: 230 million francs
- Architect: Pierre Parat

Tenant
- Gothiques d'Amiens

The Coliséum is a multi-sport arena in Amiens, France. It is the home of the Gothiques d'Amiens of the Ligue Magnus. The center features two ice rinks and an Olympic-sized swimming pool.

== History ==
In 1989, the mayor of Amiens proposed that a new facility replace the aging Palais des Sport, Amiens' 60-year-old sporting facility. While the foundation was being laid, in 1993, four Gallo-Roman houses from the first or second century AD were discovered on site and excavated; several tons of historical materials were brought from them to the collection of Amiens.

== Events ==
- 1997 French Figure Skating championships
- Hosted some of the 2006 Men's World Ice Hockey Championships preliminary rounds
