= Bjørn Uldall =

Danish ice hockey player (born 1994)

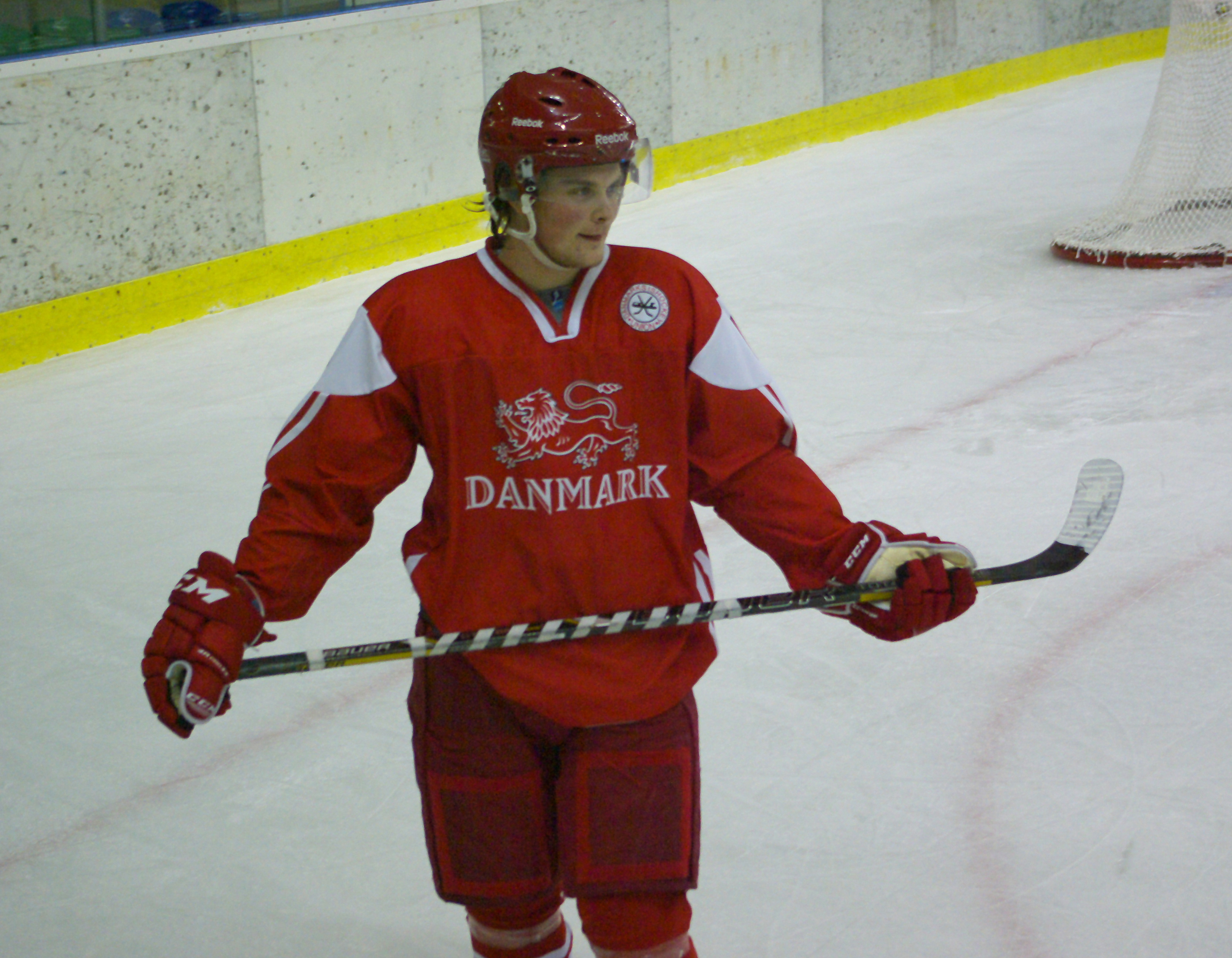
- Born: April 10, 1994 (age 30); Herning, Denmark
- Height: 1.80 m (5 ft 11 in)
- Weight: 76 kg (168 lb; 12 st 0 lb)
- Position: Defence
- Shoots: Left
- ML team: Herning Blue Fox
- National team: Denmark
- Playing career: 2011–present

Bjørn Uldall (Danish pronunciation: [ˈpjɶɐ̯ˀn ˈulˌtɛˀl]; born April 10, 1994) is a Danish ice hockey player for Herning Blue Fox and the Danish national team. He participated at the 2015 IIHF World Championship.
