= Jørgen Karterud =

Norwegian ice hockey player (born 1994)

- Born: May 6, 1994 (age 32) Oslo, Norway
- Height: 6 ft 4 in (193 cm)
- Weight: 190 lb (86 kg; 13 st 8 lb)
- Position: Forward
- Shoots: Left
- GET-ligaen team Former teams: Vålerenga; Soo Greyhounds; Västerviks IK; Linköpings HC; Karlskrona HK; HK Poprad
- National team: Norway
- Playing career: 2011–present

Jørgen Karterud (born May 6, 1994) is a Norwegian professional ice hockey player. He is currently playing for Vålerenga of the GET-ligaen.

Karterud made his GET-ligaen debut playing with Vålerenga Ishockey during the 2011–12 GET-ligaen season. He remained with the team until 2016 when he moved to Sweden, playing in the Swedish Hockey League for Linköpings HC and the HockeyAllsvenskan for Västerviks IK.

== Career statistics ==
=== Regular season and playoffs ===
| | | | Regular season | | | | | Playoffs |
| Season | Team | League | GP | G | A | Pts | PIM | GP | G | A | Pts | PIM |

=== International ===
| Year | Team | Event | Result | GP | G | A | Pts | PIM |
