= Andreas Heier =

- Born: 5 December 1993 (age 32) Fredrikstad, Norway
- Height: 1.84 m (6 ft 0 in)
- Weight: 88 kg (194 lb; 13 st 12 lb)
- Position: Left/Right wing
- Shoots: Left
- EIHL team Former teams: Manchester Storm; Modo Hockey; IK Pantern; Vålerenga Ishockey; Stjernen Hockey
- National team: Norway
- NHL draft: Undrafted
- Playing career: 2011–present

Andreas Heier (born 5 December 1993) is a Norwegian ice hockey player for Manchester Storm and the Norwegian national team.

He represented Norway at the 2021 IIHF World Championship.
