= Raphael Andergassen =

Italian ice hockey player

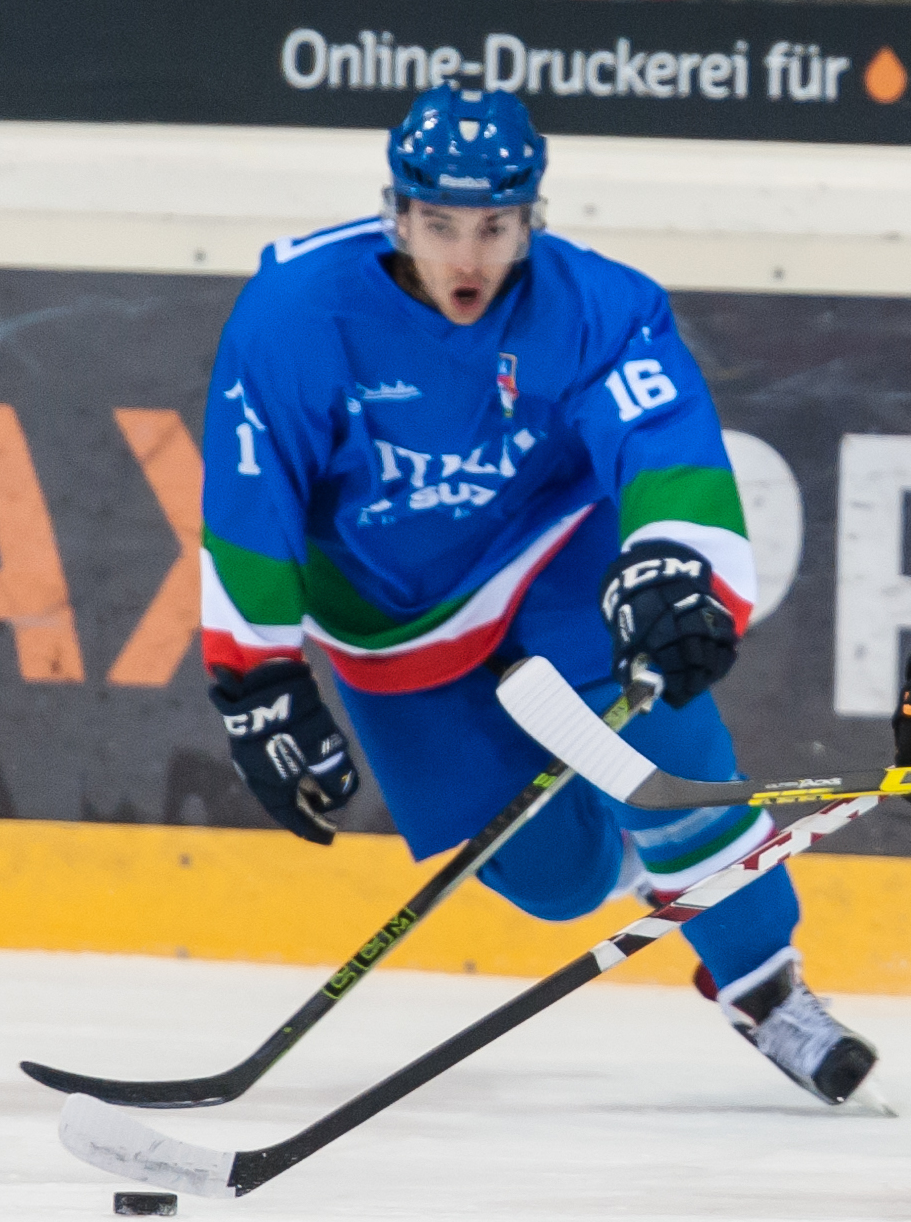
- Born: 16 June 1993 (age 31); Bolzano, Italy
- Height: 5 ft 10 in (178 cm)
- Weight: 161 lb (73 kg; 11 st 7 lb)
- Position: Forward
- Shoots: Right
- ICEHL team Former teams: HC Pustertal Wölfe; SV Kaltern; Ritten Sport
- National team: Italy
- Playing career: 2010–present

Raphael Andergassen (born 16 June 1993) is an Italian ice hockey player for HC Pustertal Wölfe in the ICE Hockey League (ICEHL) and the Italian national team.

He participated at the 2017 IIHF World Championship.
