= David Kickert =

Austrian ice hockey player (born 1994)

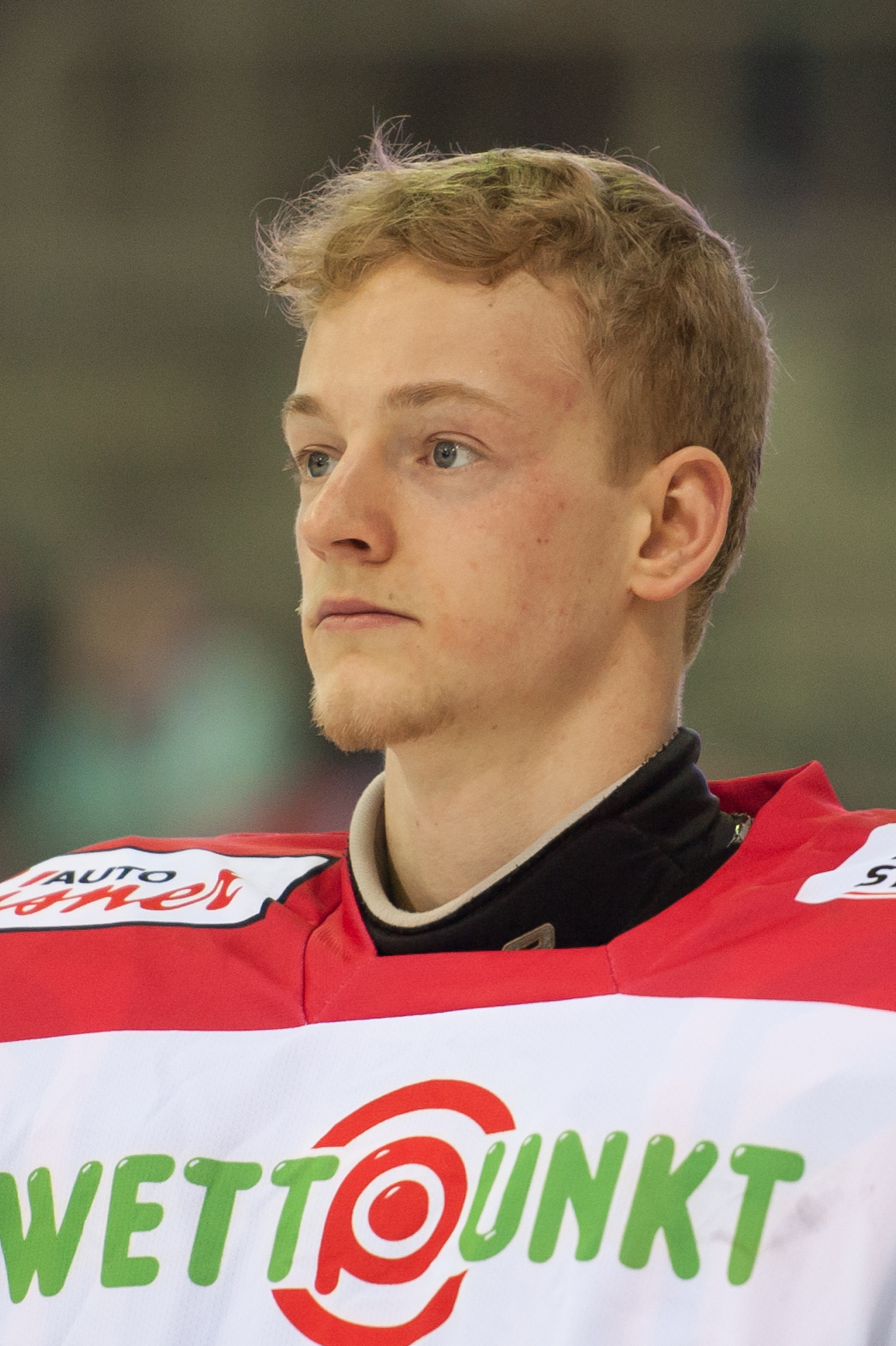
- Born: 16 March 1994 (age 32) Korneuburg, Austria
- Height: 6 ft 2 in (188 cm)
- Weight: 168 lb (76 kg; 12 st 0 lb)
- Position: Goaltender
- Catches: Left
- ICEHL team Former teams: EC Red Bull Salzburg; Vienna Capitals; EC VSV; Black Wings 1992; Augsburger Panther
- National team: Austria
- Playing career: 2013–present

David Kickert (born 16 March 1994) is an Austrian professional ice hockey player who is a goaltender for EC Red Bull Salzburg of the ICE Hockey League (ICEHL). He also plays in the Austrian national team.
