= Norway men's national junior ice hockey team =

Norway
- Association: Norwegian Ice Hockey Federation
- General manager: Jan Brandvold
- Head coach: Anders Gjøse
- Most points: Trond Magnussen (43)
- Team colors
- IIHF code: NOR
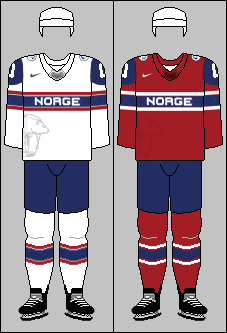

First international
- Soviet Union 17 – 0 Norway (Karlskoga, Sweden; 27 December 1978)

Biggest win
- Norway 18 – 2 Croatia (Gdańsk, Poland; 15 December 2009)

Biggest defeat
- United States 19 – 1 Norway (Regina, Saskatchewan, Canada; 1 January 1991)

IIHF World Junior Championship
- Appearances: 46 (first in 1979)
- Best result: 6th (1990)

International record (W–L–T)
- 90–90–12

The Norway men's national junior ice hockey team is the national junior ice hockey team in Norway. The team represents Norway at the International Ice Hockey Federation's IIHF World Junior Championship. The team also occasionally participates in international friendly tournaments under the names Norway B or Norway U25.

In 1979, Norway made their first appearance at the Pool A level in Karlstad, Sweden. Norway scored 2 goals. Norway did not return to Pool A until 1983, staying until 1991. Norway would have to wait 15 years to make it to the top level. In the 2006 World Junior Hockey Championships in Vancouver, Norway lost 11–2 to the United States and 4–0 in a hard-fought game to Canada. A brawl nearly started toward the end of the game with Canada.

== World Junior Championship record ==
Year	GP	W	L	T	GF	GA	Pts	Rank
1979	5	0	5	0	6	46	0	8th place – Demoted to Pool B
1980	4	3	1	0	28	10	6	11th place (3rd in Pool B)
1981	5	3	0	2	32	18	8	10th place (2nd in Pool B)
1982	4	4	0	0	18	8	8	9th place (1st in Pool B) – Promoted to Pool A
1983	7	0	7	0	13	69	0	8th place – Demoted to Pool B
1984	5	2	3	0	29	21	4	12th place (4th in Pool B)
1985	7	2	4	1	23	28	5	13th place (5th in Pool B)
1986	7	5	1	1	54	16	11	10th place (2nd in Pool B)
1987	5	3	1	1	38	25	7	10th place (2nd in Pool B)
1988	7	5	2	0	38	18	10	9th place (1st in Pool B) – Promoted to Pool A
1989	7	1	6	0	14	56	2	7th place
1990	7	2	5	0	25	51	4	6th place
1991	7	0	7	0	8	75	0	8th place – Demoted to Pool B
1992	7	5	2	0	45	17	10	11th place (3rd in Pool B)
1993	7	6	1	0	49	11	12	10th place (2nd in Pool B)
1994	7	5	1	1	28	15	11	10th place (2nd in Pool B)
1995	7	3	3	1	27	26	7	13th place (5th in Pool B)
1996	6	3	3	0	18	16	6	13th place (3rd in Pool B)
1997	6	2	1	3	33	23	7	14th place (4th in Pool B)
1998	6	3	3	0	21	22	6	17th place (7th in Pool B)
1999	6	2	4	0	17	25	4	16th place (6th in Pool B)
2000	5	2	3	0	18	14	4	14th place (4th in Pool B)
2001	5	3	2	0	20	14	6	14th place (4th in Division I)
2002	5	3	2	0	19	14	5	13th place (3rd in Division I)
2003	5	2	2	1	17	16	5	16th place (3rd in Division I, Group B)
2004	5	3	2	0	21	10	6	14th place (2nd in Division I, Group B)
2005	5	5	0	0	29	12	10	11th place (1st in Division I, Group A) – Promoted to Top Division
2006	6	0	6	0	6	34	0	10th place – Relegated to Division I
2007	5	2†	3	0	15	14	5	19th place (5th in Division I, Group B)
2008	5	3	2	0	19	16	9	16th place (3rd in Division I, Group A)
2009	5	3†	2	0	14	17	8	16th place (3rd in Division I, Group B)
2010	5	5†	0	0	33	8	14	12th place (1st in Division I, Group A) – Promoted to Top Division
2011	6	1	5	0	6	35	3	9th place – Relegated to Division IA
2012	5	3	2	0	19	13	9	13th place (3rd in Division I, Group A)
2013	5	5	0	0	19	7	14	11th place (1st in Division I, Group A) – Promoted to Top Division
2014	4	0	4	0	3	29	0	10th place – Relegated to Division IA
2015	5	4	1	0	16	11	10	12th place (2nd in Division I, Group A)
2016	5	2	3	0	21	14	7	14th place (4th in Division I, Group A)
2017	5	1	4	0	10	17	3	16th place (6th in Division I, Group A) – Relegated to Division IB
2018	5	5#	0	0	18	5	13	17th place (1st in Division I, Group B) – Promoted to Division IA
2019	5	3†	2	0	15	13	8	13th place (3rd in Division I, Group A)
2020	5	3#	2	0	12	11	7	14th place (4th in Division I, Group A)
2022	5	3	2	0	20	13	9	13th place (3rd in Division I, Group A)
2023	5	5	0	0	19	8	15	11th place (1st in Division I, Group A) – Promoted to Top Division
2024	5	0	5+	0	12	31	1	10th place – Relegated to Division I
2025	5	3	2	0	13	8	5	13th Place (3rd in Division I, Group A)
2026	5	5†	0	0	37	11	14	11th place (1st in Division I, Group A) – Promoted to Top Division
2027								

† Includes one win in extra time (in the preliminary round)
^ Includes one loss in extra time (in the preliminary round)
* Includes one win in extra time (in the playoff round)
+ Includes one loss in extra time (in the playoff round)
# Includes two wins in extra time
