= Luka Gračnar =

Slovenian ice hockey player (born 1993)

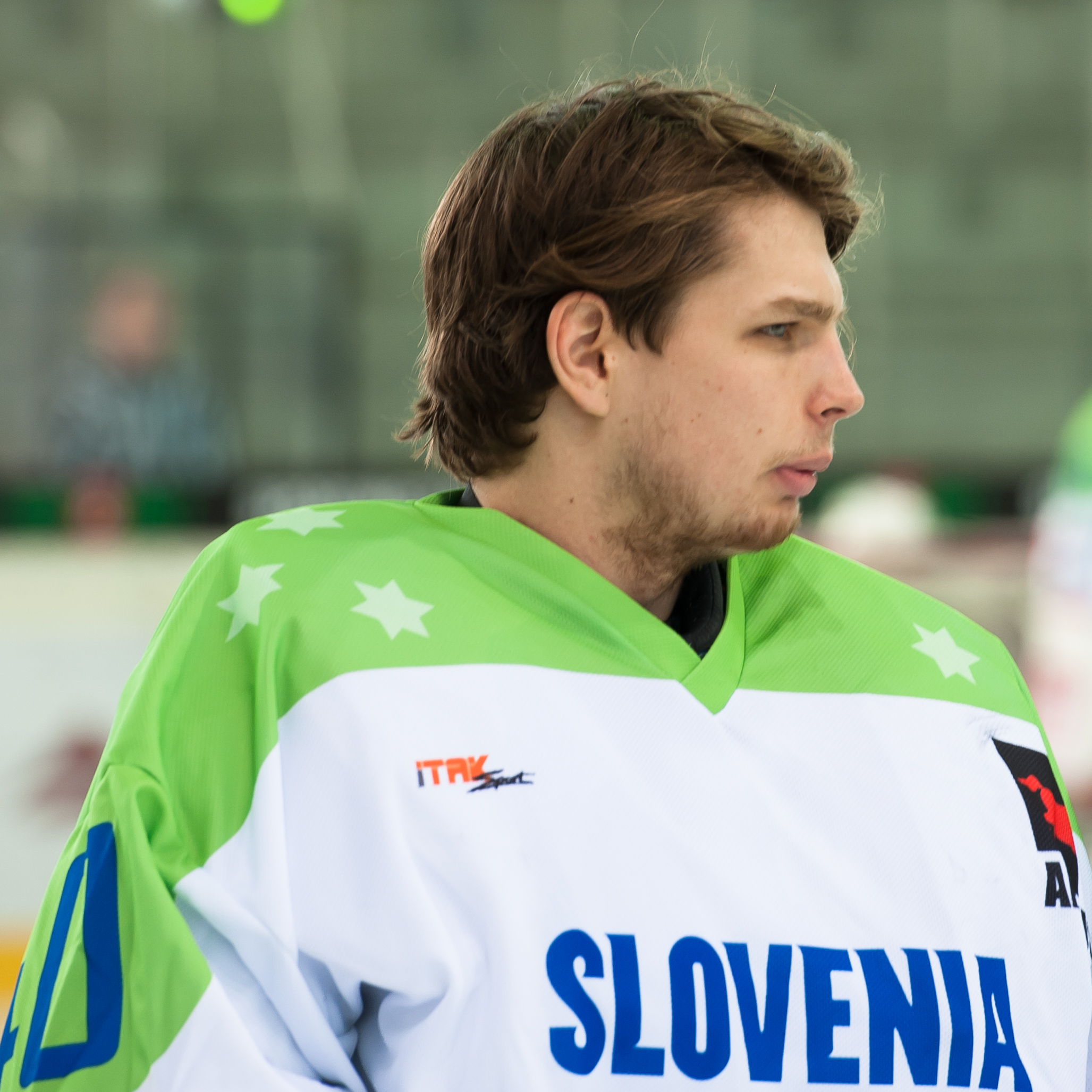
- Born: October 31, 1993 (age 31); Jesenice, Slovenia
- Height: 5 ft 10 in (178 cm)
- Weight: 183 lb (83 kg; 13 st 1 lb)
- Position: Goaltender
- Catches: Left
- DEL2 team Former teams: Eispiraten Crimmitschau; HDD Jesenice; EC Red Bull Salzburg; HK Poprad; HC TWK Innsbruck; Storhamar Ishockey; Black Wings 1992
- National team: Slovenia
- Playing career: 2010–present

Luka Gračnar (born October 31, 1993) is a Slovenian professional ice hockey goaltender. He is currently playing for Eispiraten Crimmitschau of the DEL2.

Gračnar played as a member of Team Slovenia at the 2013 IIHF World Championship.
