= Steffen Søberg =

Norwegian ice hockey player (born 1993)

- Born: August 6, 1993 (age 32) Oslo, Norway
- Height: 5 ft 10 in (178 cm)
- Weight: 172 lb (78 kg; 12 st 4 lb)
- Position: Goaltender
- Caught: Left
- Played for: Manglerud Star; Vålerenga
- National team: Norway
- NHL draft: 117th overall, 2011; Washington Capitals
- Playing career: 2011–2022

Steffen Kent Søberg (born August 6, 1993) is a Norwegian former professional ice hockey goaltender who played in the GET-ligaen for Vålerenga. He was selected by Washington Capitals in the 4th round (117th overall) of the 2011 NHL entry draft, becoming the first Norwegian goalie to ever get drafted by an NHL-team. Later that year he was selected 6th overall by the Swift Current Broncos in the 2011 CHL Import Draft.

Internationally he has played for the Norwegian national team in several World Championships, and was named to the roster for the 2014 Winter Olympics, though he did not play.
