= 2022 World Junior Ice Hockey Championships – Division I =

International ice hockey tournament

2022 IIHF U20 World Championship Division I
Tournament details
- Host countries: Denmark; Estonia
- Venue(s): 2 (in 2 host cities)
- Dates: 12–18 December 2021
- Teams: 12

The 2022 World Junior Ice Hockey Championship Division I consisted of two tiered groups of six teams each: the second-tier Division I A and the third-tier Division I B. Due to the exclusion of Russia and Belarus, the following changes in promotions and relegations were made: Latvia as the second-placed team of Division I A was promoted to the 2022 Top Division, their second Junior World Championship tournament this season. In Division I B, the top two teams were promoted to the next year's Division I A. In both tournaments, no team was relegated to a lower division.

To be eligible as a junior player in these tournaments, a player couldn't be born earlier than 2002.

== Division I A ==
2022 IIHF U20 World Championship Division I A

Tournament details
- Host country: Denmark
- City: Hørsholm
- Venue(s): 1 (in 1 host city)
- Dates: 12–18 December 2021
- Teams: 6

Tournament statistics
- Games played: 15
- Goals scored: 95 (6.33 per game)
- Attendance: 4,078 (272 per game)
- Scoring leader(s): (Belarus) Alexander Suvorov (11 points)

Official website
- www.iihf.com

The Division I A tournament was played in Hørsholm, Denmark, from 12 to 18 December 2021.

=== Participating teams ===
Team	Qualification
Kazakhstan	placed 10th in 2020 Top Division and was relegated
Latvia	placed 2nd in 2020 Division I A
Belarus	placed 3rd in 2020 Division I A
Norway	placed 4th in 2020 Division I A
Denmark	hosts; placed 5th in 2020 Division I A
Hungary	placed 1st in 2020 Division I B and was promoted

=== Match officials ===
Eight referees and eight linesmen were selected for the tournament.

Referees

- (Sweden) Daniel Eriksson
- (Switzerland) Micha Hebeisen
- (Belarus) Miroslav Iarets
- (Denmark) Niclas Lundsgaard
- (Austria) Chrisitan Ofner
- (Hungary) Zsombor Pálkövi
- (Norway) Marcus Wannerstedt
- (Slovakia) Marek Žák

Linesmen

- (Denmark) Albert Ankerstjerne
- (Norway) Knut Bråten
- (Latvia) Uldis Bušs
- (Denmark) Emil Dalsgaard
- (Denmark) Henrik Haurum
- (Czech Republic) David Klouček
- (Belarus) Artsiom Labzov
- (Austria) Simon Riecken

=== Final standings ===
Pos	Team	Pld	W	OTW	OTL	L	GF	GA	GD	Pts	Promotion
1	Belarus (Note: Belarus was suspended from all IIHF competitions in May 2022 due to IIHF ban)	5	5	0	0	0	26	8	+18	15	Suspended from IIHF competitions
2	Latvia (Note: Latvia was promoted to replace Russia in the Top Division after the latter was also suspended from all IIHF competitions)	5	4	0	0	1	19	10	+9	12	Promoted to the 2022 Top Division
3	Norway	5	3	0	0	2	20	13	+7	9	
4	Kazakhstan	5	2	0	0	3	12	14	−2	6	
5	Denmark (H)	5	1	0	0	4	13	24	−11	3	
6	Hungary	5	0	0	0	5	5	26	−21	0	

Source: IIHF
Rules for classification: 1) points; 2) head-to-head points; 3) head-to-head goal difference; 4) head-to-head number of goals scored; 5) result against closest best-ranked team outside tied teams; 6) result against second-best ranked team outside tied teams; 7) seeding before tournament.
(H) Host

=== Match results ===
All times are local (Central European Time – UTC+1).

12 December 2021; 13:00	Hungary	1–3 (0–2, 1–1, 0–0)	Kazakhstan	Bitcoin Arena, Hørsholm; Attendance: 122

Game reference

Gergely Orosz
Goalies
Maxim Pavlenko
Referees:
(Belarus) Miroslav Iarets
(Norway) Marcus Wannerstedt
Linesmen:
(Latvia) Uldis Bušs
(Denmark) Emil Dalsgaard

	0–1	00:42 – Mangisbayev (Tsybin)
	0–2	18:56 – Logvin (Kassenov, Alibek) (PP2)
	0–3	25:49 – Kolodyuk (Alexandrov, Shaikhmeddenov)
Schlekmann (Tóth, Ortenszky) – 33:21	1–3

14 min
Penalties
14 min
24
Shots
33

12 December 2021; 16:30	Norway	2–4 (2–2, 0–1, 0–1)	Latvia	Bitcoin Arena, Hørsholm; Attendance: 143

Game reference

Markus Stensrud
Goalies
Bruno Brūveris
Referees:
(Denmark) Niclas Lundsgaard
(Slovakia) Marek Žák
Linesmen:
(Belarus) Artsiom Labzov
(Austria) Simon Riecken

Trygg (Øby-Olsen, Johnsen) (PP) – 06:11	1–0
	1–1	06:40 – Ansons (Mūrnieks)
	1–2	08:21 – Orniņš (Mūrnieks, Ravinskis)
Holm (Øby-Olsen) (PP) – 13:43	2–2
	2–3	25:26 – Vilmanis (Brants, Simanovičs)
	2–4	44:30 – Mūrnieks (Ansons)

6 min
Penalties
18 min
27
Shots
23

12 December 2021; 20:00	Denmark	1–9 (0–2, 1–4, 0–3)	Belarus	Bitcoin Arena, Hørsholm; Attendance: 623

Game reference

Louis Ingvordsen
Goalies
Alexei Kolosov
Referees:
(Switzerland) Micha Hebeisen
(Hungary) Zsombor Pálkövi
Linesmen:
(Denmark) Albert Ankerstjerne
(Czech Republic) David Klouček

	0–1	14:49 – Pinchuk (Levshunov, Suvorov)
	0–2	15:29 – Demchenko (Chezganov, Palchik)
	0–3	23:41 – Spat (S. Karpovich) (SH)
Larsen (Bang, Brændgaard) (PP) – 25:23	1–3
	1–4	36:10 – Sidorov (Klavdiyev, Kuzmin)
	1–5	36:52 – Kuznetsov (Suvorov, Kuzmin) (PP2)
	1–6	37:15 – Klavdiyev (Demchenko, Sidorov) (PP)
	1–7	48:38 – Pozhigan (Pinchuk, Suvorov)
	1–8	50:22 – D. Karpovich (Morozov)
	1–9	56:29 – Chezganov (Demchenko, Palchik)

10 min
Penalties
14 min
19
Shots
37

13 December 2021; 13:00	Kazakhstan	2–5 (0–0, 0–4, 2–1)	Norway	Bitcoin Arena, Hørsholm; Attendance: 102

Game reference

Maxim Pavlenko
Jelal-ad-Din Amirbekov
Goalies
Markus Røhnebæk Stensrud
Referees:
(Sweden) Daniel Eriksson
(Austria) Chrisitan Ofner
Linesmen:
(Norway) Knut Bråten
(Denmark) Henrik Haurum

	0–1	29:15 – Dahl (Johnsen, Holm)
	0–2	32:09 – Ahlsen (Øby-Olsen, Strandborg)
	0–3	36:09 – Trygg (Olsen, Johnsen) (PP)
	0–4	38:55 – Strandborg (Trygg, Haughom)
Nurlan (Kassenov, Logvin) – 46:32	1–4
Kaiyrzhan (Shaikhmeddenov) – 47:12	2–4
	2–5	49:23 – Engebråten (Elvsveen, Olsen)

14 min
Penalties
33 min
17
Shots
40

13 December 2021; 16:30	Belarus	8–2 (5–1, 0–1, 3–0)	Hungary	Bitcoin Arena, Hørsholm; Attendance: 133

Game reference

Alexei Kolosov
Goalies
Tamás Antek
Referees:
(Denmark) Niclas Lundsgaard
(Slovakia) Marek Žák
Linesmen:
(Belarus) Artsiom Labzov
(Austria) Simon Riecken

Suvorov (Kuznetsov, Pozhigan) – 03:21	1–0
Kuzmin (Pinchuk, Suvorov) (PP) – 06:29	2–0
	2–1	07:57 – Schlekmann (Németh, Hadobás)
Kuznetsov – 09:13	3–1
Suvorov (Pinchuk, Yuzlenko) – 13:25	4–1
Palchik (Suvorov, Pinchuk) – 19:28	5–1
	5–2	20:30 – Németh (Csollák)
Pinchuk – 41:49	6–2
Demchenko (Palchik) – 53:07	7–2
Kuznetsov (Pinchuk, Kuzmin) (PP) – 54:42	8–2

20 min
Penalties
10 min
44
Shots
20

13 December 2021; 20:00	Latvia	5–4 (1–1, 2–3, 2–0)	Denmark	Bitcoin Arena, Hørsholm; Attendance: 472

Game reference

Kārlis Mežsargs
Bruno Brūveris
Goalies
Thor Baden
Louis Ingvordsen
Referees:
(Belarus) Miroslav Iarets
(Norway) Marcus Wannerstedt
Linesmen:
(Latvia) Uldis Bušs
(Denmark) Emil Dalsgaard

Silkalns (Dukurs, Purmalis) (PP) – 11:55	1–0
	1–1	13:21 – Bang (SH)
	1–2	25:02 – A. Nielsson (Mølgaard, Skjellerup) (SH)
	1–3	30:16 – Almquist (Bang)
Bergmanis (Laviņš) – 31:16	2–3
	2–4	36:33 – Lauritzen (Borring Hansen, J. Jensen)
Ansons (Hodass, Brants) (PP2) – 39:59	3–4
Simanovičs (Brants, Ansons) – 54:18	4–4
Ansons (Vītoliņš) – 58:34	5–4

4 min
Penalties
18 min
52
Shots
16

15 December 2021; 13:00	Latvia	1–2 (0–0, 0–1, 1–1)	Belarus	Bitcoin Arena, Hørsholm; Attendance: 136

Game reference

Bruno Brūveris
Goalies
Alexei Kolosov
Referees:
(Sweden) Daniel Eriksson
(Switzerland) Micha Hebeisen
Linesmen:
(Denmark) Henrik Haurum
(Austria) Simon Riecken

	0–1	33:33 – Spat (Kuznetsov, Suvorov) (PP)
	0–2	52:52 – Suvorov (Pinchuk, Kuzmin)
Ansons (PS) – 55:17	1–2

6 min
Penalties
8 min
28
Shots
27

15 December 2021; 16:30	Hungary	1–5 (1–1, 0–2, 0–2)	Norway	Bitcoin Arena, Hørsholm; Attendance: 146

Game reference

Gergely Orosz
Goalies
Fabian Plogås
Referees:
(Belarus) Miroslav Iarets
(Denmark) Niclas Lundsgaard
Linesmen:
(Denmark) Albert Ankerstjerne
(Belarus) Artsiom Labzov

	0–1	02:14 – S. Wold (Engebråten)
Tóth – 13:32	1–1
	1–2	23:52 – Olsen (Dahl, Engebråten) (PP)
	1–3	32:19 – Øby-Olsen (Jonassen, Ahlsen)
	1–4	40:57 – Dahl (Engebråten, E. Wold) (PP)
	1–5	52:05 – Dahl (Granath, E. Wold) (PP)

39 min
Penalties
8 min
13
Shots
30

15 December 2021; 20:00	Kazakhstan	4–1 (0–0, 2–1, 2–0)	Denmark	Bitcoin Arena, Hørsholm; Attendance: 498

Game reference

Maxim Pavlenko
Goalies
Thor Baden
Referees:
(Austria) Chrisitan Ofner
(Hungary) Zsombor Pálkövi
Linesmen:
(Norway) Knut Bråten
(Czech Republic) David Klouček

Morozhnikov (Tsybin, Shulga) – 31:37	1–0
Morozhnikov (Shetle, Komarov) – 33:08	2–0
	2–1	33:45 – Bang (Larsen, Almquist) (PP)
Ospanov – 45:05	3–1
Shulga (Kaiyrzhan) (ENG) – 58:24	4–1

37 min
Penalties
12 min
21
Shots
20

16 December 2021; 13:00	Latvia	6–1 (3–1, 0–0, 3–0)	Hungary	Bitcoin Arena, Hørsholm; Attendance: 131

Game reference

Bruno Brūveris
Goalies
Tamás Antek
Gergely Orosz
Referees:
(Norway) Marcus Wannerstedt
(Slovakia) Marek Žák
Linesmen:
(Denmark) Albert Ankerstjerne
(Latvia) Uldis Bušs

Vilmanis (Ansons, Vītoliņš) (PP) – 06:56	1–0
Ravinskis (Lapinskis) – 13:56	2–0
	2–1	33:45 – Tóth (Hadobás)
Vītoliņš (Vilmanis, Bergmanis) – 19:12	3–1
Gavars (Laviņš, Hodass) (PP) – 46:26	4–1
Laviņš (Dukurs, Hodass) (PP) – 49:55	5–1
Ločmelis – 58:01	6–1

12 min
Penalties
37 min
41
Shots
14

16 December 2021; 16:30	Belarus	4–2 (2–1, 1–1, 1–0)	Kazakhstan	Bitcoin Arena, Hørsholm; Attendance: 124

Game reference

Alexei Kolosov
Goalies
Maxim Pavlenko
Referees:
(Sweden) Daniel Eriksson
(Hungary) Zsombor Pálkövi
Linesmen:
(Denmark) Henrik Haurum
(Czech Republic) David Klouček

Kuznetsov (Suvorov, Chezganov) (PP) – 05:56	1–0
Chezganov (Demchenko, Palchik) – 08:15	2–0
	2–1	10:53 – Tsybin (Shulga)
Chezganov (Palchik, Demchenko) – 23:39	3–1
	3–2	36:44 – Morozhnikov (Shulga)
Sidorov (Chezganov, Klavdiyev) – 42:29	4–2

6 min
Penalties
8 min
32
Shots
19

16 December 2021; 20:00	Norway	6–3 (2–1, 4–1, 0–1)	Denmark	Bitcoin Arena, Hørsholm; Attendance: 543

Game reference

Markus Røhnebæk Stensrud
Goalies
Louis Ingvordsen
Referees:
(Switzerland) Micha Hebeisen
(Austria) Chrisitan Ofner
Linesmen:
(Norway) Knut Bråten
(Denmark) Emil Dalsgaard

Granath (SH) – 04:19	1–0
	1–1	05:16 – Als (Müller, Stenbakken) (PP)
Olsen (Dahl, Granath) – 08:00	2–1
	2–2	23:38 – Almquist (Bang, Brændgaard)
Holm (Elvsveen) – 35:51	3–2
E. Wold (Borring Hansen, Granath) – 37:21	4–2
Strandborg (Dahl, Jonassen) – 37:48	5–2
Trygg (Holm, Olsen) – 38:19	6–2
	6–3	58:16 – Schioldan (Müller) (PP)

8 min
Penalties
8 min
46
Shots
13

18 December 2021; 13:00	Belarus	3–2 (0–0, 1–2, 2–0)	Norway	Bitcoin Arena, Hørsholm; Attendance: 145

Game reference

Alexei Kolosov
Goalies
Markus Røhnebæk Stensrud
Referees:
(Switzerland) Micha Hebeisen
(Denmark) Niclas Lundsgaard
Linesmen:
(Denmark) Henrik Haurum
(Austria) Simon Riecken

	0–1	29:41 – Johnsen (Holm, Engebråten)
	0–2	30:26 – Øby-Olsen (Elvsveen, Haughom)
Chezganov (Levshunov, Demchenko) – 33:46	1–2
Suvorov (Pinchuk, Levshunov) – 48:17	2–2
Demchenko (Palchik, Sazanovich) (ENG) – 59:18	3–2

37 min
Penalties
8 min
22
Shots
31

18 December 2021; 16:30	Denmark	4–0 (0–0, 1–0, 3–0)	Hungary	Bitcoin Arena, Hørsholm; Attendance: 627

Game reference

Thor Baden
Goalies
Gergely Orosz
Referees:
(Sweden) Daniel Eriksson
(Austria) Chrisitan Ofner
Linesmen:
(Norway) Knut Bråten
(Czech Republic) David Klouček

Schioldan (Mølgaard, A. Nielsson) – 26:55	1–0
Larsen (Almquist) (PP) – 44:53	2–0
A. Nielsson – 50:10	3–0
Brændgaard (Larsen, Bang) (PP) – 55:16	4–0

6 min
Penalties
10 min
36
Shots
15

18 December 2021; 20:00	Kazakhstan	1–3 (0–1, 0–1, 1–1)	Latvia	Bitcoin Arena, Hørsholm; Attendance: 133

Game reference

Jelal-ad-Din Amirbekov
Goalies
Bruno Brūveris
Referees:
(Belarus) Miroslav Iarets
(Hungary) Zsombor Pálkövi
Linesmen:
(Denmark) Albert Ankerstjerne
(Belarus) Artsiom Labzov

	0–1	16:25 – Dukurs (Brants, Ansons) (PP)
	0–2	32:08 – Silkalns (Laviņš, Gavars) (PP)
	0–3	51:37 – Gavars (Ansons, Bergmanis) (PP)
Shulga (Tsybin) – 52:13	1–3

35 min
Penalties
10 min
25
Shots
34

=== Statistics ===
==== Top 10 scorers ====
Pos	Player	Country	GP	G	A	Pts	+/–	PIM
1	Alexander Suvorov	Belarus	5	4	7	11	+6	2
2	Raivis Ansons	Latvia	5	4	5	9	+2	4
3	Vitali Pinchuk	Belarus	5	2	7	9	+6	4
4	Valentin Demchenko	Belarus	5	4	5	9	+8	0
5	Yegor Chezganov	Belarus	5	4	3	7	+8	10
6	Alexander Palchik	Belarus	5	1	6	7	+7	6
7	Sergei Kuznetsov	Belarus	5	4	2	6	+7	2
8	Andreas Dahl	Norway	5	3	3	6	–1	4
8	Eskild Bakke Olsen	Norway	5	3	3	6	+3	2
10	Lukas Bang	Denmark	5	2	4	6	–6	0
10	Ole Julian Holm	Norway	5	2	4	6	+5	0

GP = Games played; G = Goals; A = Assists; Pts = Points; +/− = Plus–minus; PIM = Penalties In Minutes
Source: IIHF.com

==== Goaltending leaders ====
(minimum 40% team's total ice time)

Pos	Player	Country	TOI	GA	Sv%	GAA	SO
1	Bruno Bruveris	Latvia	261:27	6	93.88	1.38	0
2	Alexei Kolosov	Belarus	300:00	8	93.16	1.60	0
3	Thor Baden	Denmark	177:11	7	91.76	2.37	1
4	Maxim Pavlenko	Kazakhstan	217:35	10	90.48	2.76	0
5	Gergely Orosz	Hungary	184:12	12	87.88	3.91	0

TOI = Time on ice (minutes:seconds); GA = Goals against; GAA = Goals against average; Sv% = Save percentage; SO = Shutouts
Source: IIHF.com

==== Best Players Selected by the Directorate ====
- Goaltender: (Belarus) Alexei Kolosov
- Defenceman: (Norway) Ole Julian Holm
- Forward: (Belarus) Alexander Suvorov

Source: IIHF.com

== Division I B ==
2022 IIHF U20 World Championship Division I B

Tournament details
- Host country: Estonia
- City: Tallinn
- Venue(s): 1 (in 1 host city)
- Dates: 12–18 December 2021
- Teams: 6

Tournament statistics
- Games played: 15
- Goals scored: 114 (7.6 per game)
- Attendance: 5,475 (365 per game)
- Scoring leader(s): (France) Tomas Simonsen (15 points)

Official website
- www.iihf.com

The Division I B tournament was played in Tallinn, Estonia, from 12 to 18 December 2021.

=== Participating teams ===
Team	Qualification
Slovenia	placed 6th in 2020 Division I A and were relegated
France	placed 2nd in 2020 Division I B
Ukraine	placed 3rd in 2020 Division I B
Poland	placed 4th in 2020 Division I B
Estonia	hosts; placed 5th in 2020 Division I B
Japan	placed 1st in 2020 Division II A and were promoted

=== Match officials ===
Four referees and seven linesmen were selected for the tournament.

Referees

- (Switzerland) Cedric Borga
- (France) Yann Furet
- (Russia) Alexander Samarin
- (Kazakhstan) Vladimir Yefremov

Linesmen

- (Latvia) Emīls Druseiks
- (Poland) Michał Gerne
- (Finland) Onni Hautamäki
- (Slovenia) Tadej Snoj
- (Lithuania) Laurynas Stepankevičius
- (France) Jason Thorrignac
- (Estonia) Toivo Tilku

=== Final standings ===
Pos	Team	Pld	W	OTW	OTL	L	GF	GA	GD	Pts	Promotion
1	France	5	4	0	1	0	23	15	+8	13	Promoted to the 2023 Division I A
2	Slovenia	5	4	0	0	1	28	13	+15	12	Promoted to the 2023 Division I A
3	Japan	5	3	0	0	2	22	17	+5	9	
4	Ukraine	5	2	1	0	2	23	20	+3	8	
5	Estonia (H)	5	0	1	0	4	9	25	−16	2	
6	Poland	5	0	0	1	4	9	24	−15	1	

Source: IIHF
Rules for classification: 1) points; 2) head-to-head points; 3) head-to-head goal difference; 4) head-to-head number of goals scored; 5) result against closest best-ranked team outside tied teams; 6) result against second-best ranked team outside tied teams; 7) seeding before tournament.
(H) Host

=== Match results ===
All times are local (Eastern European Time – UTC+2).

12 December 2021; 12:30	Poland	2–6 (0–2, 0–0, 2–4)	France	Tondiraba Ice Hall, Tallinn; Attendance: 157

Game reference

Oskar Polak
Goalies
Maxime Makeev
Referee:
(Switzerland) Cedric Borga
Linesmen:
(Latvia) Emīls Druseiks
(Finland) Onni Hautamäki

	0–1	07:47 – Simonsen (Hervé, Gueurif) (PP)
	0–2	14:53 – Simonsen (Gueurif, Roussel)
	0–3	42:18 – Hervé (Carry, Boscq)
	0–4	43:16 – Hervé (Simonsen, Fertin)
	0–5	53:00 – Simonsen
Kapica (Maciaś) – 53:21	1–5
Maćkowski (Biłas) – 56:57	2–5
	2–6	57:16 – Hervé (Simonsen, Gueurif)

10 min
Penalties
31 min
23
Shots
41

12 December 2021; 16:00	Estonia	2–7 (1–2, 1–4, 0–1)	Ukraine	Tondiraba Ice Hall, Tallinn; Attendance: 565

Game reference

Juri Bahturin
Georg Vladimirov
Goalies
Semen Maiko
Referee:
(France) Yann Furet
Linesmen:
(Poland) Michał Gerne
(Slovenia) Tadej Snoj

	0–1	02:10 – Hrabovetskyi (Varava)
	0–2	08:36 – Korzhyletskyi (Honcharenko, Yevtukhov)
Stepanov (E. Potšinok, Jõgi) – 16:51	1–2
	1–3	21:23 – Trakht (Cholach, Korzhyletskyi) (PP)
	1–4	27:13 – Korzhyletskyi (Simchuk, Cholach) (PP)
	1–5	28:11 – Honcharenko (Simchuk, Cholach) (PP)
	1–6	29:46 – Honcharenko (Simchuk, Cholach)
Kontseus (Kudeviita, Mürkel) (PP) – 31:34	2–6
	2–7	49:25 – Hrebenyk (Panasenko, Shapovalov) (PP)

35 min
Penalties
10 min
26
Shots
44

12 December 2021; 19:30	Japan	3–7 (0–2, 2–1, 1–4)	Slovenia	Tondiraba Ice Hall, Tallinn; Attendance: 132

Game reference

Issa Otsuka
Goalies
Luka Kolin
Referee:
(Russia) Alexander Samarin
Linesmen:
(Lithuania) Laurynas Stepankevičius
(France) Jason Thorrignac

	0–1	03:08 – Mašič (Povše, Beričič) (PP)
	0–2	12:09 – Žeželj (Skerlep, Langus)
Murase (Toko) – 20:18	1–2
Ando (Okubo, Sasanaka) (PP) – 23:26	2–2
	2–3	36:03 – Mehle (Mahkovec) (PP)
	2–4	41:14 – Török (Mašič)
Tsutsumi (Ando) (SH) – 46:12	3–4
	3–5	46:27 – Černe
	3–6	52:23 – Gomboc (Slivnik, Mahkovec) (PP)
	3–7	58:49 – Slivnik (Gomboc, Mahkovec)

41 min
Penalties
16 min
32
Shots
37

14 December 2021; 12:30	Ukraine	1–3 (0–1, 1–1, 0–1)	Japan	Tondiraba Ice Hall, Tallinn; Attendance: 168

Game reference

Dmytro Kubrytskyi
Goalies
Issa Tamura
Referee:
(Switzerland) Cedric Borga
Linesmen:
(Slovenia) Tadej Snoj
(Estonia) Toivo Tilku

	0–1	13:26 – Ueno (Ando, Tsutsumi)
	0–2	24:52 – Owa (Murase, Sato) (PP)
Simchuk (Honcharenko, Korzhyletskyi) – 39:19	1–2
	1–3	59:50 – Tsutsumi (ENG)

6 min
Penalties
4 min
23
Shots
34

14 December 2021; 16:00	Slovenia	3–1 (1–1, 1–0, 1–0)	Poland	Tondiraba Ice Hall, Tallinn; Attendance: 243

Game reference

Luka Kolin
Goalies
Mikołaj Szczepkowski
Referee:
(Russia) Alexander Samarin
Linesmen:
(Finland) Onni Hautamäki
(France) Jason Thorrignac

Pretnar (Mahkovec, Gomboc) – 01:28	1–0
	1–1	09:49 – Bukowski (Drozd-Niekurzak, Schafer)
Brodnik (PS) – 30:36	2–1
Mehle (Mašič) – 45:46	3–1

6 min
Penalties
8 min
40
Shots
18

14 December 2021; 19:30	France	2–0 (0–0, 1–0, 1–0)	Estonia	Tondiraba Ice Hall, Tallinn; Attendance: 435

Game reference
Antoine Keller	Goalies	Georg Vladimirov	Referee: (Kazakhstan) Vladimir Yefremov; Linesmen: (Latvia) Emīls Druseiks (Lithuania) Laurynas Stepankevičius
Simonsen (Gueurif) – 37:35 / 1–0; Dair (Larroque) – 52:55 / 2–0			Referee: (Kazakhstan) Vladimir Yefremov; Linesmen: (Latvia) Emīls Druseiks (Lithuania) Laurynas Stepankevičius
8 min	Penalties	4 min	Referee: (Kazakhstan) Vladimir Yefremov; Linesmen: (Latvia) Emīls Druseiks (Lithuania) Laurynas Stepankevičius
31	Shots	29	Referee: (Kazakhstan) Vladimir Yefremov; Linesmen: (Latvia) Emīls Druseiks (Lithuania) Laurynas Stepankevičius

15 December 2021; 12:30	Japan	7–2 (2–2, 3–0, 2–0)	Poland	Tondiraba Ice Hall, Tallinn; Attendance: 135

Game reference

Issa Tamura
Goalies
Mikołaj Szczepkowski
Oskar Polak
Referee:
(France) Yann Furet
Linesmen:
(Latvia) Emīls Druseiks
(France) Jason Thorrignac

Ando (Sato, Takahashi) – 03:06	1–0
Taneichi (Toko, Murase) (PP) – 12:57	2–0
	2–1	14:39 – Kasperek (Kasprzyk, Bochnak)
	2–2	16:16 – Kasperek (Wybiral, Bochnak) (PP)
Kasai (Murase, Sato) – 24:17	3–2
Owa (Murase, Sato) – 24:53	4–2
Sato (Taneichi) – 25:56	5–2
Toko (Okubo, Taneichi) (PP) – 45:25	6–2
Tsutsumi (Ando, Ueno) – 54:22	7–2

14 min
Penalties
41 min
33
Shots
23

15 December 2021; 16:00	France	6–7 OT (1–5, 3–0, 2–1) (OT: 0–1)	Ukraine	Tondiraba Ice Hall, Tallinn; Attendance: 354

Game reference

Maxime Makeev
Antoine Keller
Goalies
Semen Maiko
Dmytro Kubrytskyi
Referee:
(Russia) Alexander Samarin
Linesmen:
(Poland) Michał Gerne
(Estonia) Toivo Tilku

Simonsen (Roussel) – 05:26	1–0
	1–1	06:48 – Hrabovetskyi (Varava, Tkach)
	1–2	07:38 – Honcharenko (Simchuk) (PP)
	1–3	10:47 – Simchuk (Korzhyletskyi, Honcharenko)
	1–4	11:49 – Tsarkovskyi (Cholach, Panasenko)
	1–5	19:30 – Trakht (Cholach, Korzhyletskyi)
Gueurif (Boscq) (PP) – 23:25	2–5
Hervé (Gueurif, Simonsen) (PP) – 30:40	3–5
Dair – 31:31	4–5
Leborgne – 42:07	5–5
Colombin (Simonsen) (PP) – 46:13	6–5
	6–6	57:29 – Simchuk (Trakht, Korzhyletskyi) (PP)
	6–7	62:44 – Hrebenyk (Simchuk, Korzhyletskyi)

34 min
Penalties
22 min
30
Shots
39

15 December 2021; 19:30	Slovenia	8–2 (2–2, 4–0, 2–0)	Estonia	Tondiraba Ice Hall, Tallinn; Attendance: 621

Game reference

Gašper Panjtar
Goalies
Georg Vladimirov
Juri Bahturin
Referee:
(Kazakhstan) Vladimir Yefremov
Linesmen:
(Finland) Onni Hautamäki
(Lithuania) Laurynas Stepankevičius

	0–1	11:05 – M. Potšinok (Stepanov, E. Potšinok) (PP)
Ćosić (Mahkovec, Slivnik) – 12:36	1–1
	1–2	17:05 – Kirillov
Mehle (Beričič, Mašič) – 18:50	2–2
Mahkovec (Gomboc) – 24:54	3–2
Langus (Dolinar, Ćosić) – 25:51	4–2
Török (Brodnik, Mašič) – 28:34	5–2
Slivnik (Mahkovec) – 31:32	6–2
Burgar (Pretnar) – 53:59	7–2
Ćosić (Mahkovec, Gomboc) – 57:27	8–2

10 min
Penalties
12 min
46
Shots
25

17 December 2021; 12:30	Ukraine	4–8 (1–4, 1–2, 2–2)	Slovenia	Tondiraba Ice Hall, Tallinn; Attendance: 215

Game reference

Dmytro Kubrytskyi
Semen Maiko
Goalies
Luka Kolin
Referee:
(Switzerland) Cedric Borga
Linesmen:
(Poland) Michał Gerne
(Estonia) Toivo Tilku

	0–1	10:18 – Mašič (Mehle, Povše)
Panasenko (Tsarkovskyi) – 10:47	1–1
	1–2	12:16 – Gomboc (Pretnar, Mašič)
	1–3	15:03 – Török
	1–4	19:49 – Mahkovec (Gomboc) (PP)
	1–5	25:45 – Mahkovec (Černe, Mašič)
Simchuk (Korzhyletskyi, Cholach) (PP) – 27:15	2–5
	2–6	31:44 – Burgar (Černe, Gomboc)
	2–7	46:28 – Brodnik (Gomboc, Török)
Varava (Panasenko, Paliichuk) (PP) – 50:13	3–7
	3–8	53:02 – Žeželj (Povše, Mašič) (PP2)
Korzhyletskyi (Honcharenko, Simchuk) (PP) – 55:09	4–8

18 min
Penalties
10 min
21
Shots
27

17 December 2021; 16:00	France	6–4 (0–0, 4–0, 2–4)	Japan	Tondiraba Ice Hall, Tallinn; Attendance: 230

Game reference

Antoine Keller
Goalies
Issa Tamura
Referee:
(Kazakhstan) Vladimir Yefremov
Linesmen:
(Finland) Onni Hautamäki
(Slovenia) Tadej Snoj

Bachelet (Tomasino, Carry) (PP) – 25:34	1–0
Djemel (Carry) – 25:44	2–0
Dogémont (Colombin, Simonsen) (PP) – 28:16	3–0
Simonsen (Hervé) – 33:05	4–0
	4–1	42:00 – Ando (Ueno) (PP)
	4–2	45:13 – Sato (PS)
Simonsen (Roussel, Bachelet) – 45:29	5–2
	5–3	47:39 – Sato (Murase) (PP)
Colombin (Gueurif, Simonsen) (PP) – 51:15	6–3
	6–4	51:48 – Ando (Takahashi, Ueno)

20 min
Penalties
14 min
35
Shots
25

17 December 2021; 19:30	Poland	3–4 OT (1–0, 0–0, 2–3) (OT: 0–1)	Estonia	Tondiraba Ice Hall, Tallinn; Attendance: 563

Game reference

Oskar Polak
Goalies
Georg Vladimirov
Referee:
(France) Yann Furet
Linesmen:
(Latvia) Emīls Druseiks
(Lithuania) Laurynas Stepankevičius

Bochnak (Kasperek, Kapica) (PP) – 04:58	1–0
	1–1	42:14 – M. Potšinok (Kulintsev, Kudeviita) (PP2)
	1–2	45:00 – Kontseus (Kudeviita, Stepanov) (PP)
Wybiral (Florczak, Maciaś) – 53:12	2–2
Sterbenz (Bukowski) – 56:10	3–2
	3–3	59:21 – M. Potšinok (E. Potšinok, Jõgi) (EA)
	3–4	60:10 – Kulintsev (Stepanov, Kontseus)

35 min
Penalties
12 min
37
Shots
36

18 December 2021; 12:30	Slovenia	2–3 (0–2, 1–0, 1–1)	France	Tondiraba Ice Hall, Tallinn; Attendance: 320

Game reference

Luka Kolin
Goalies
Antoine Keller
Referee:
(Switzerland) Cedric Borga
Linesmen:
(Poland) Michał Gerne
(Finland) Onni Hautamäki

	0–1	05:25 – Hervé (Gueurif, Simonsen) (PP)
	0–2	08:27 – Hervé (Fertin, Colombin)
Povše (Langus, Burgar) – 22:04	1–2
Beričič (Žeželj, Brodnik) (PP) – 43:46	2–2
	2–3	53:24 – Corvez (Simonsen)

8 min
Penalties
6 min
24
Shots
32

18 December 2021; 16:00	Ukraine	4–1 (2–1, 1–0, 1–0)	Poland	Tondiraba Ice Hall, Tallinn; Attendance: 352

Game reference

Semen Maiko
Goalies
Oskar Polak
Referee:
(Kazakhstan) Vladimir Yefremov
Linesmen:
(Latvia) Emīls Druseiks
(Estonia) Toivo Tilku

	0–1	05:03 – Ślusarczyk (Maciaś)
Korzhyletskyi (Simchuk, Honcharenko) – 06:09	1–1
Trakht (Korzhyletskyi, Simchuk) (PP) – 14:08	2–1
Korzhyletskyi (Honcharenko, Cholach) (PP) – 21:45	3–1
Honcharenko (Simchuk, Korzhyletskyi) – 52:34	4–1

18 min
Penalties
12 min
34
Shots
30

18 December 2021; 19:30	Estonia	1–5 (0–1, 1–1, 0–3)	Japan	Tondiraba Ice Hall, Tallinn; Attendance: 985

Game reference

Georg Vladimirov
Goalies
Issa Otsuka
Referee:
(France) Yann Furet
Linesmen:
(Slovenia) Tadej Snoj
(France) Jason Thorrignac

	0–1	07:32 – Taneichi
	0–2	20:31 – Ueno (Tsutsumi, Takahashi)
M. Potšinok (Jõgi, E. Potšinok) – 24:38	1–2
	1–3	45:52 – Tsutsumi (Ando, Ueno)
	1–4	48:24 – Nemoto (SH)
	1–5	49:06 – Sato (Ando, Kasai)

8 min
Penalties
8 min
15
Shots
43

=== Statistics ===
==== Top 10 scorers ====
Pos	Player	Country	GP	G	A	Pts	+/–	PIM
1	Tomas Simonsen	France	5	7	8	15	+8	2
2	Danylo Korzhyletskyi	Ukraine	5	5	9	14	+1	8
3	Mykhail Simchuk	Ukraine	5	4	9	13	+3	0
4	Denys Honcharenko	Ukraine	5	4	6	10	+1	0
5	Marcel Mahkovec	Slovenia	5	3	7	10	+9	2
6	Yusaku Ando	Japan	5	4	5	9	+4	6
7	Luka Gomboc	Slovenia	5	2	7	9	+9	2
7	Bine Mašič	Slovenia	5	2	7	9	+8	2
9	Jordan Herve	France	5	6	2	8	+6	4
10	Theo Gueurif	France	5	1	7	8	+5	4

GP = Games played; G = Goals; A = Assists; Pts = Points; +/− = Plus–minus; PIM = Penalties In Minutes
Source: IIHF

==== Goaltending leaders ====
(minimum 40% team's total ice time)

Pos	Player	Country	TOI	GA	Sv%	GAA	SO
1	Antoine Keller	France	231:57	10	90.91	2.59	1
2	Georg Vladimirov	Estonia	236:38	16	90.12	4.06	0
3	Luka Kolin	Slovenia	238:42	11	89.32	2.76	0
4	Issa Tamura	Japan	178:09	9	88.89	3.03	0
5	Oskar Polak	Poland	214:14	16	87.60	4.48	0

TOI = Time on ice (minutes:seconds); GA = Goals against; GAA = Goals against average; Sv% = Save percentage; SO = Shutouts
Source: IIHF

==== Best Players Selected by the Directorate ====
- Goaltender: (Estonia) Georg Vladimirov
- Defenceman: (Slovenia) Bine Mašič
- Forward: (France) Tomas Simonsen

Source: IIHF
