= IIHF World U20 Championship Division I =

Men's U-20 international ice hockey tournament

- Upcoming season or competition: 2027 IIHF U20 World Championship Division I
- Formerly: B-series (1979–2000)
- Sport: Ice hockey
- Founded: 1979 (B-series); 2001 (Division I)
- No. of teams: 12
- Promotion to: IIHF World U20 Championship
- Relegation to: Division II
- Website: IIHF.com

The IIHF World U20 Championship Division I is played every year among the ice hockey teams under the age of 20 who were placed in Division I in the previous year.

Until 2001 the tournament was known as the B-series.

== Results ==
Year	Promoted		Relegated	
Year	To IIHF U20 Top division	To Division I A	To Division I B	To IIHF U20 Division II
2001	France	–	–	Latvia
2002	Germany	–	–	No relegated team
2003	Ukraine, Austria	–	–	Croatia, Poland
2004	Germany, Belarus	–	–	Hungary, Japan
2005	Norway, Latvia	–	–	Great Britain, Estonia
2006	Germany, Belarus	–	–	Japan, Hungary
2007	Denmark, Kazakhstan	–	–	Estonia, Italy
2008	Germany, Latvia	–	–	Lithuania, Great Britain
2009	Switzerland, Austria	–	–	Estonia, Hungary
2010	Germany, Norway	–	–	France, Poland
2011	Latvia, Denmark	–	–	Ukraine, Lithuania
2012	Germany	France	Great Britain	Japan
2013	Norway	Poland	France	Croatia
2014	Denmark	Italy	Poland	Japan
2015	Belarus	Kazakhstan	Slovenia	Hungary
2016	Latvia	France	Italy	Japan
2017	Belarus	Hungary	Norway	Great Britain
2018	Kazakhstan	Norway	Hungary	Lithuania
2019	Germany	Slovenia	France	Japan
2020	Austria	Hungary	Slovenia	Italy
2021	Cancelled due to the COVID-19 pandemic.			
2022	Latvia	France, Slovenia	No relegated teams	
2023	Norway	Japan	Slovenia	South Korea
2024	Kazakhstan	Slovenia	Japan	Croatia
2025	Denmark	Ukraine	Hungary	South Korea
2026	Norway	Hungary	France	Italy

== Pool B ==
=== Results (1979–2000) ===
Year	National team
1979	Switzerland
1980	Austria
1981	Switzerland
1982	Norway
1983	Switzerland
1984	Poland
1985	Switzerland
1986	Poland
1987	West Germany
1988	Norway
1989	Poland
1990	Switzerland
1991	Germany
1992	Japan
1993	Switzerland
1994	Ukraine
1995	Switzerland, Slovakia
1996	Poland
1997	Kazakhstan
1998	Belarus
1999	Ukraine
2000	Belarus
