= Alexander Kim =

Kazakh ice hockey player

- Born: September 26, 2005 (age 20) Astana, Kazakhstan
- Height: 180 cm (5 ft 11 in)
- Weight: 75 kg (165 lb; 11 st 11 lb)
- Position: Forward
- Shoots: Right
- Liiga team: Porin Ässät
- National team: Kazakhstan
- NHL draft: Undrafted
- Playing career: 2025–present

Alexander "Sasha" Kim (Born 26 September 2005, alternative spelling Aleksandr Kim) is a Kazakh ice hockey forward who plays for Porin Ässät of the Liiga as of the 2025-26 season.

Kim's youth team is the HK Astana. He has played for HC Ässät's juniors and won a NAHL championship with the Bismarck Bobcats. Kim has represented Kazakhstan in youth tournaments.

== Career ==
=== Junior ===
Alexander Kim started ice hockey at his youth club HK Astana in Kazakhstan. He moved to Pori, Finland and the HC Ässät Pori organization at 13 years old in 2019, starting with Ässät Flames in the C2 AAA league, where he scored 67 points in 28 games. Kim played in Ässät U16 for 24 games, scoring 27 points in the 2020-21 season. The following 2021-2022 season Kim moved up to Ässät U18 where in his first season he scored 34 points in 39 regular season games. In the 2022-23 U18 season Kim played 41 games, scoring 70 points.

Alexander Kim started the 2023-24 season with Ässät U20 in the U20 SM-sarja, becoming the first ever Kazakh in the league along with his teammate Davlat Nurkenov. Kim played 20 games and scored 7 points before moving to the Bismarck Bobcats of the NAHL where he played 21 games and scored 13 points. Kim continued with the Bobcats for the 2024-25 season as assistant captain. He played 44 games and scored 28 points and at the end of the season won the NAHL championship with the Bobcats.

=== Professional ===
Alexander Kim returned to HC Ässät for the 2025-26 season, starting with the U20 team for the first 27 games of the season, scoring 43 points, before signing his first professional Liiga contract with the HC Ässät team. In the U20 SM-sarja, Kim was chosen as the player of the month for November. Kim made his professional debut with HC Ässät on 19 December 2025 against the Lahti Pelicans. Kim played on the first line with Feetu Knihti and Jan-Mikael Järvinen as well as the powerplay and scored a goal in the shootout. Kim scored his first goal on 27 December 2025 against HPK Hämeenlinna.

== International play ==
Alexander Kim played his first international game for Kazakhstan in the U18 WJC Division I in 2023. He played in five games, in which he socred four points total. Kim was called by the Kazakhstan U20 to the 2024 WJC Division I, where he played five games scoring four points and winning the promotion to the top division of the WJC for the next tournament. Kim's first top flight tournament was the 2025 WJC where he played as Kazakhstans alternate captain for five games, scoring one point and seeing Kazakhstan relegated from the top division.

== Career statistics ==
=== Regular season and playoffs ===
			Regular season					Playoffs
Season	Team	League	GP	G	A	Pts	PIM	GP	G	A	Pts	PIM
2023–24	Porin Ässät	U20	20	4	3	7	31	—	—	—	—	—
2023–24	Bismarck Bobcats	NAHL	21	6	7	13	4	9	1	3	4	0
2024–25	Bismarck Bobcats	NAHL	44	17	11	28	16	13	4	3	7	2

=== International ===
Year	Team	Event	Result	GP	G	A	Pts	PIM
2023	Kazakhstan	WJC18 D1A	1st	5	3	1	4	0
2024	Kazakhstan	WJC D1A	1st	5	2	2	4	0
2025	Kazakhstan	WJC	10th	5	1	0	1	2
Junior totals				15	6	3	9	2
