= Artyom Levshunov =

Belarusian ice hockey player (born 2005)

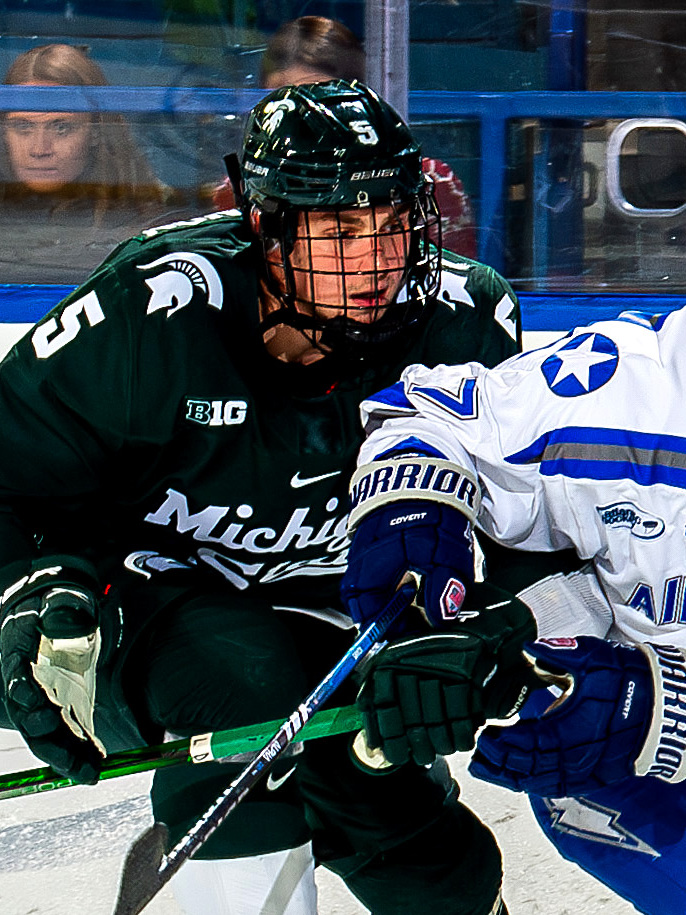
- Levshunov with Michigan State in October 2023
- Born: October 28, 2005 (age 20) Zhlobin, Belarus
- Height: 6 ft 2 in (188 cm)
- Weight: 208 lb (94 kg; 14 st 12 lb)
- Position: Defence
- Shoots: Right
- NHL team: Chicago Blackhawks
- NHL draft: 2nd overall, 2024; Chicago Blackhawks
- Playing career: 2024–present

Artyom Andreyevich Levshunov (Belarusian: Арцём Андрэевіч Леўшуноў, Arciom Andrejevič Leŭshunoŭ; born October 28, 2005) is a Belarusian professional ice hockey player who is a defenceman for the Chicago Blackhawks of the National Hockey League (NHL). He played college ice hockey for the Michigan State University. He was selected second overall by the Blackhawks in the 2024 NHL entry draft, the highest-drafted Belarusian player in NHL history, and made his NHL debut in 2025.

== Playing career ==
=== Amateur ===
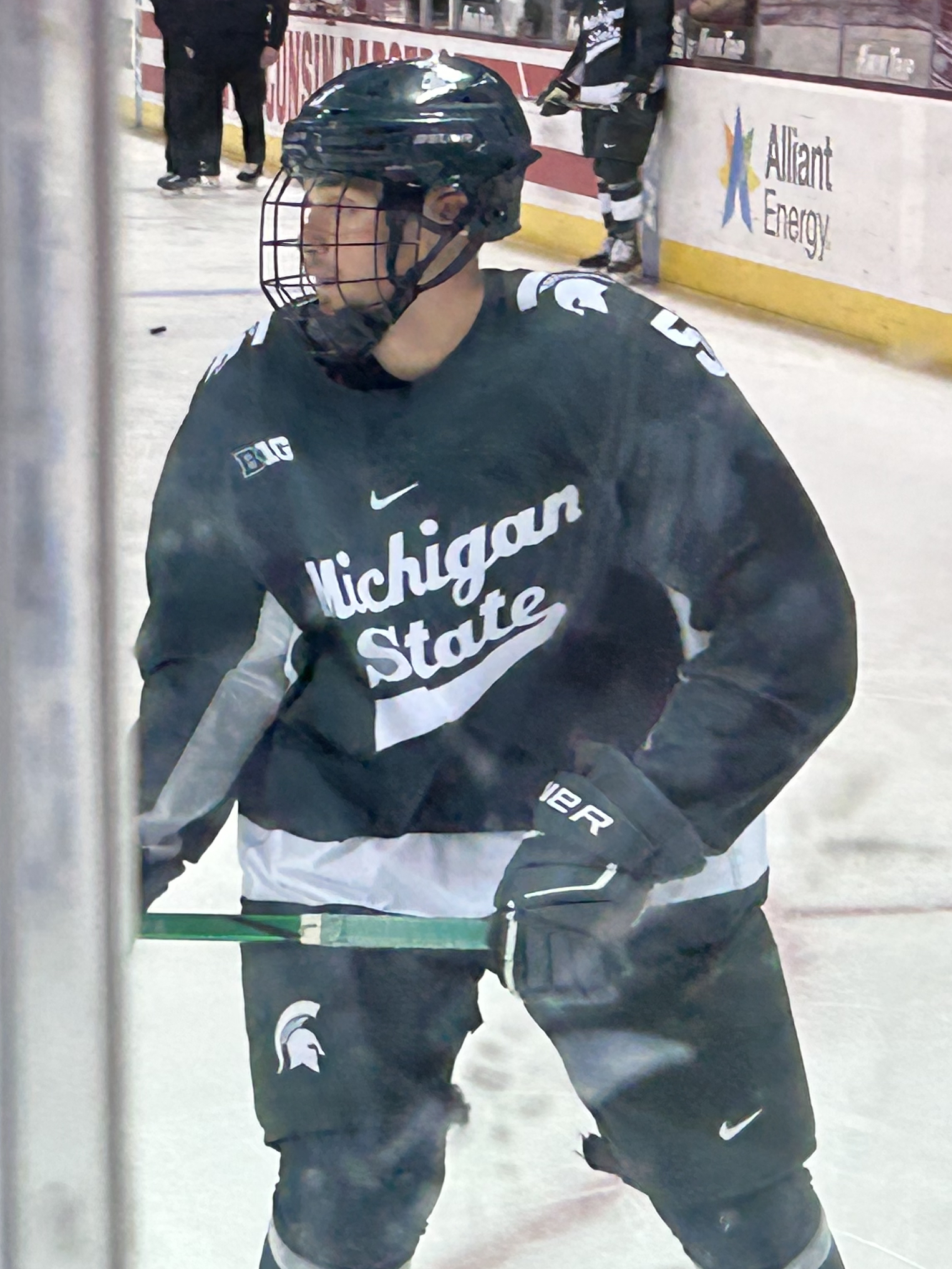
Levshunov with Michigan State in March 2024

Following the 2021–22 season, in which he scored 25 goals and 38 assists in 63 games for Belarus under-18 team in the second-tier Belarusian Vysshaya Liga, Levshunov was selected 111th overall by the Green Bay Gamblers in the eighth round of the 2022 United States Hockey League (USHL) Phase II Draft.

Debuting with the Gamblers as a 16-year-old and speaking very little English, he quickly earned his first USHL Defencemen of the Week award on November 9, 2022, for a week in which he recorded two goals and three assists for five points in two games. On March 20, 2023, Levshunov earned his second USHL Defenceman of the Week with four points (one goal and three assists) in two games. He finished the 2022–23 season with 13 goals, ranking third among USHL defencemen. After getting knocked out in the first round of the playoffs by the Dubuque Fighting Saints, Levshunov was named to the USHL First All-Rookie Team and the Third All-USHL Team.

Levshunov committed to play college ice hockey for Michigan State University in the summer of 2023. On October 7, 2023, he made his collegiate debut for Michigan State in the first game of the season-opener series against Lake Superior State. The next day, he recorded his first goal and assist in the second game of the series. Levshunov finished the 2023–24 season with nine goals and 26 assists in 38 games, placing ninth overall in total points among NCAA defencemen with 35. He was selected as the Big Ten Freshman of the Year and the Big Ten Defensive Player of the Year.

=== Professional ===
==== Chicago Blackhawks (2024–present) ====
Levshunov was drafted second overall by the Chicago Blackhawks in the 2024 NHL entry draft, making him the highest-drafted player from Belarus. He signed a three-year, entry-level contract with the Blackhawks on July 6, 2024.

In the summer of 2024, Levshunov fractured his foot by blocking a shot during a three-on-three tournament. Despite fracturing his foot, he went on to skate for over a month before an MRI scan at the Blackhawks' training camp revealed the injury. Although originally expected to miss only the Tom Kurver Showcase, further evaluations expected him to miss six weeks with two weeks in a walking boot. He was placed on the injured reserve on October 4, missing training camp, the preseason, and the season-opener. On October 22, Levshunov was activated off injured reserve and assigned to the Blackhawks' American Hockey League (AHL) affiliate, the Rockford IceHogs. He made his NHL debut on March 10, 2025, against the Colorado Avalanche. He recorded 20:55 of ice time and a plus–minus of –1 in a 3–0 loss.

== International play ==
Medal record

Men's ice hockey

Representing Belarus

World Junior Championships
Gold medal – first place	2022 Denmark	Division I Group A

Levshunov debuted internationally with Belarus junior team at the 2022 World Junior Championships, in the Division I Group A tournament. He helped the team to win a gold medal with two assists in five games.

== Career statistics ==
=== Regular season and playoffs ===
			Regular season					Playoffs
Season	Team	League	GP	G	A	Pts	PIM	GP	G	A	Pts	PIM
2020–21	Team Belarus U17	BLR.2	46	10	16	26	28	7	2	3	5	0
2021–22	Team Belarus U18	BLR.2	46	25	38	63	28	13	7	10	17	2
2022–23	Green Bay Gamblers	USHL	62	13	29	42	38	3	0	1	1	0
2023–24	Michigan State University	B1G	38	9	26	35	44	—	—	—	—	—
2024–25	Rockford IceHogs	AHL	52	5	17	22	59	7	1	0	1	10
2024–25	Chicago Blackhawks	NHL	18	0	6	6	8	—	—	—	—	—
2025–26	Chicago Blackhawks	NHL	68	2	22	24	44	—	—	—	—	—
NHL totals			86	2	28	30	52	—	—	—	—	—

=== International ===
Year	Team	Event	Result	GP	G	A	Pts	PIM
2022	Belarus	WJC (Div IA)	1st place, gold medalist(s)	5	0	2	2	4
Junior totals				5	0	2	2	4

== Awards and honours ==
Award	Year	Ref
USHL
All-USHL Third Team	2023	
All-Rookie First Team	2023	
College
All-Big Ten First Team	2024	
All-Big Ten Freshman Team	2024	
Big Ten Defensive Player of the Year	2024	
Big Ten Freshman of the Year	2024	
AHCA West Second Team All-American	2024	

Awards and achievements
Preceded by Adam Fantilli	Big Ten Freshman of the Year; 2023–24	Succeeded by Michael Hage
Preceded by Brock Faber	Big Ten Defensive Player of the Year; 2023–24	Succeeded by Sam Rinzel
Preceded by Oliver Moore	Chicago Blackhawks first-round draft pick 2024	Succeeded by Sacha Boisvert
