= Eskild Bakke Olsen =

- Born: 19 March 2002 (age 24) Hamar, Norway
- Height: 6 ft 2 in (188 cm)
- Weight: 203 lb (92 kg; 14 st 7 lb)
- Position: Centre
- Shoots: Right
- NHL team (P) Cur. team Former teams: Ottawa Senators; Belleville Senators (AHL); Storhamar Hockey; Linköping HC
- National team: Norway
- NHL draft: Undrafted
- Playing career: 2019–present

Eskild Bakke Olsen (born March 19, 2002) is a Norwegian professional ice hockey player who as a center for the Belleville Senators in the American Hockey League (AHL) as a prospect under contract to the Ottawa Senators of the National Hockey League (NHL). Bakke Olsen made his senior debut for parent club Storhamar in the Eliteserien season 2019/20 and won two Norwegian silver medals with the club in 2022 and 2023. He then joined Swedish BIK Karlskoga in the Hockeyallsvenskan and was named the Rookie of the Year in the Hockeyallsvenskan 2024. The same year he signed a contract with Linköping HC in the Swedish Hockey League and played for the club in the 2025/26 season. In the summer of 2026 he signed an NHL contract with the Senators.

Bakke Olsen made his senior national team debut in 2022 and has represented Norway in three World Championships; in 2026 he won bronze, Norway's first ever World Championship medal. As a junior, he played in the 2022 World Championships for Norway.

== Playing career ==
=== 2017–2023: Beginning of career in Norway ===
Bakke Olsen began his ice hockey career in parent club Storhamar . In the 2017/18 season, he accounted for 81 points in 28 games in Storhamar's U16 team. He finished second in the points league and with 58 assist points, he was the series' assists leader. The following season, he played mainly for Storhamar U18 and also debuted in Storhamar U21. In 23 games for the U18, he accounted for 29 points and finished third in league scoring. In the 2019/20 season, Bakke Olsen made his debut in the Eliteserien and played a total of 28 regular season games for Storhamar. He made his debut in a 1–2 loss against Stjernen Hockey on October 3, 2019. The following month, on 7 December, he scored his first goal in the Eliteserien in a 9–2 win against Grüner Ishockey. With his five points, he was the U18 junior who scored the most points in the league. This season he also played for Storhamar U18 and U21.

The 2020–21 season was Bakke Olsen's first full season in the Eliteserien. However, the season was interrupted early due to the COVID-19 pandemic . Bakke Olsen finished in third place in the team's internal points league with 26 points in 24 regular season matches, of which seven goals. The 2021/22 season was Bakke Olsen's best in terms of points in the Eliteserien regular season. He played 27 games and was noted for 29 points (9 goals, 20 assists). The team finished in sixth place in the regular season and then made it to the final in the subsequent playoffs by knocking out Vålerenga Ishockey (4–2) and Stjernen (4–1). In the final, they faced Stavanger Oilers , who won the series 4–0 in matches. Bakke Olsen was thus awarded a silver medal and in 15 games he accounted for one goal and five assist points. In the 2022/23 season, Storhamar finished in second place in the regular season. Bakke Olsen had a slightly worse season in terms of points with 25 points in 40 games. For the second season in a row, the team made it to the finals in the subsequent playoffs. Once again, they fell to Stavanger, with 4–3 in games. Bakke Olsen rose in terms of points during the playoffs and scored an average of one point per game. In 17 games, he accounted for 4 goals and 13 assists.

=== 2023–2026: BIK Karlskoga and Linköping HC ===
Bakke Olsen with BIK Karlskoga

On 27 April 2023, it was confirmed that Bakke Olsen had left Norway to play for Swedish club BIK Karlskoga in the Hockeyallsvenskan . He made his debut in the Hockeyallsvenskan on 22 September of that year, in a 2–4 loss against Östersunds IK . On 5 November 2023, he scored his first goal, on Tomas Rydén, in a 2–3 loss against Tingsryds AIF . Karlskoga finished in seventh place in the regular season where Bakke Olsen won the team's internal points league with 37 points in 49 games, of which ten goals. With 27 assist points, he also won the team's internal assists league, together with Henrik Larsson . In the following playoffs, Karlskoga knocked out Kalmar HC 2–1 in games in the first round. In this series, Bakke Olsen accounted for eight points. They then knocked out Södertälje SK 4–0 in games, before being eliminated in the semifinals against Brynäs IF 4–1. In twelve playoff games, Bakke Olsen scored 14 points, which gave him third place in the playoff scoring league. He scored nine assists, which made him win the assist league together with Linus Klasen and Miks Indrašis . On April 7, 2024, Hockeyallsvenskan announced that Bakke Olsen had been awarded the Rookie of the Year award.

On 19 April 2024, it was announced that Bakke Olsen had signed a two-year contract with Linköping HC in the SHL . At the same time, the club confirmed that they would be loaning Bakke Olsen out for the first year to Karlskoga. The following season, Karlskoga finished second in the regular season and Bakke Olsen accounted for 53 points in 48 games played. This record made him the Norwegian player with the most points during a regular season in Hockeyallsvenskan; the same applies to Bakke Olsen's number of assists during a season (44). He won the team's internal points league and finished in fifth place in the total points league. In addition, he was the team that incurred the most suspensions (46). In the following playoffs, Karlskoga was eliminated in the semifinals by AIK with 4–2 in games.

Bakke Olsen played his first SHL game on 13 September 2025, a 1–2 loss to Frölunda HC . Two weeks later, on 27 September, he scored his first goal in the league, on Marek Langhamer , in a 2–5 loss to the Malmö Redhawks . After a strong start to the season, it was confirmed on 25 October 2025, that Bakke Olsen had extended his contract with Linköping for two more seasons. He missed only one game of the regular season and finished second in the team's internal points league. Linköping finished in eleventh place in the regular season, with Bakke Olsen accounting for 32 points, including eleven goals.

=== 2026-present: Ottawa Senators ===
Although still signed with Linköping HC, it was confirmed on 15 June 2026, that Bakke Olsen had signed a one-year contract with the Ottawa Senators of the NHL .

== International play ==
In 2021, Bakke Olsen was selected to play in the 2022 JVM . Norway belonged to Division I A this season. After winning three of five matches, it was clear that Norway was placed third in the table and thus failed to advance to the JVM's top division. In these five matches, Bakke Olsen scored three goals and three assists, which made him Norway's top scorer.

On 10 November 2022, Bakke Olsen made his senior international debut in a 3–6 loss to Latvia. In early May 2024, it was announced that he had been selected to play in the 2024 World Championship in the Czech Republic . Bakke Olsen did not play in the opening three matches and instead made his World Championship debut on 14 May in a 2–0 win against Denmark. In the final match of the group stage, he scored his first two senior international goals, at Jackson Whistle, in a 5–2 win against Great Britain. Norway finished sixth in Group A and in four matches played, Bakke Olsen scored two goals. He then played his second World Championship in 2025 in Sweden and Denmark . Norway finished sixth in Group B and finished twelfth in the tournament. In five matches, Bakke Olsen scored one assist.

Bakke Olsen played his third consecutive World Championship in 2026 in Switzerland. In the group stage, Norway won for the first time ever in a World Championship against Sweden after regular playing time. They finished second in Group A and had their best group result since the format was introduced in 2012. In the quarter-finals, they defeated Latvia 2–0 before being defeated 6–0 by the host nation in the semi-finals. In the bronze medal match, they won over Canada 3–2 after overtime, winning their first ever World Championship medal. In ten matches, In the tournament, Bakke Olsen had two goals and three assists.

== Career statistics ==
=== Regular season and playoffs ===
			Regular season					Playoffs
Season	Team	League	GP	G	A	Pts	PIM	GP	G	A	Pts	PIM
2019–20	Storhamar Hockey	NOR	28	2	3	5	0	—	—	—	—	—
2020–21	Storhamar Hockey	NOR	24	7	19	26	6	—	—	—	—	—
2021–22	Storhamar Hockey	NOR	27	9	20	29	8	15	1	5	6	4
2022–23	Storhamar Hockey	NOR	40	7	18	25	6	17	4	13	17	2
2023–24	BIK Karlskoga	Allsv	49	10	27	37	18	12	5	9	14	6
2024–25	BIK Karlskoga	Allsv	48	9	44	53	46	12	2	4	6	8
2025–26	Linköping HC	SHL	51	11	21	32	10	—	—	—	—	—
SHL totals			51	11	21	32	10	—	—	—	—	—

=== International ===
Year	Team	Event	Result	GP	G	A	Pts	PIM
2022	Norway	WJC (Div IA)	13th	5	3	3	6	2
2024	Norway	WC	11th	4	2	0	2	2
2024	Norway	OGQ	DNQ	3	0	0	0	0
2025	Norway	WC	12th	5	0	1	1	2
2026	Norway	WC	3rd place, bronze medalist(s)	10	2	3	5	2
Junior totals				5	3	3	6	2
Senior totals				22	4	4	8	6
