= Aleksei Kolosov =

Belarusian ice hockey player (born 2002)

- Born: 4 January 2002 (age 24) Minsk, Belarus
- Height: 6 ft 1 in (185 cm)
- Weight: 214 lb (97 kg; 15 st 4 lb)
- Position: Goaltender
- Catches: Left
- NHL team (P) Cur. team Former teams: Philadelphia Flyers; Lehigh Valley Phantoms (AHL); Dinamo-Molodechno; Dinamo Minsk
- National team: Belarus
- NHL draft: 78th overall, 2021; Philadelphia Flyers
- Playing career: 2020–present

Aleksei Andreyevich Kolosov (Russian: Алексей Андреевич Колосов, Belarusian: Аляксей Андрэевіч Коласаў; born 4 January 2002) is a Belarusian professional ice hockey player who is a goaltender for the Lehigh Valley Phantoms of the American Hockey League (AHL) while under contract the Philadelphia Flyers of the National Hockey League (NHL). He is the first Belarusian net-minder to ever play in the NHL, having made his debut on 27 October 2024.

== Playing career ==
Kolosov started the 2020–21 season with Dinamo-Molodechno of the Belarusian Extraliga. However, as travel restrictions due to the COVID-19 pandemic led to the main goaltenders for Dinamo Minsk being unavailable, Kolosov made his Kontinental Hockey League (KHL) debut. He had also agreed to terms with the Erie Otters of the Ontario Hockey League, a major junior league in Canada and the United States, who had selected him 22nd overall in the 2020 CHL Import Draft. Kolosov played 9 games for Dinamo during the season, and was later named to the Belarusian national team for the 2021 World Championship.

In the lead up to the 2021 NHL entry draft, the National Hockey League's Central Scouting Bureau ranked Kolosov the second-highest European-based goaltender. He was selected in the third round, 78th overall, by the Philadelphia Flyers. The Flyers signed Kolosov to a three-year, entry-level contract on 8 July 2023. It was later announced that Kolosov would continue his development with Dinamo Minsk on loan from the Flyers for the 2023–24 season.

On 27 October 2024, Kolosov became the first Belarusian-born goalie to play in the NHL, stopping 20 of 24 shots in a 4–3 home loss to the Montreal Canadiens. On 23 November 2024, he became the first Belarusian-born goalie to win an NHL game, stopping 19 of 21 shots in a 3–2 home win against the Chicago Blackhawks.

== International ==
Kolosov made his international debut at the 2019 World U18 Championships, where he played four games for the Belarusian under-18 team, winning one. He next played at the 2020 World Junior Championship Division IA level, appearing in three games and finishing with two wins and one loss.

Kolosov made his senior debut with the Belarus national team at the 2021 World Championship, appearing in four games and recording two losses. He also played at the 2022 World Junior Championship Division IA, and won all five games he played in, helping Belarus earn promotion to the top level for 2023.

== Career statistics ==
=== Regular season and playoffs ===
			Regular season									Playoffs
Season	Team	League	GP	W	L	OT	MIN	GA	SO	GAA	SV%	GP	W	L	MIN	GA	SO	GAA	SV%
2017–18	BFSO Dinamo	BLR-2	14	—	—	—	—	—	—	1.85	—	5	—	—	—	—	—	4.54	—
2018–19	Belarus U17	BLR-2	11	10	0	0	—	—	1	1.97	—	4	2	2	—	—	0	2.53	—
2018–19	Belarus U18	BLR-2	18	7	6	1	—	—	1	3.09	.892	—	—	—	—	—	—	—	—
2019–20	Belarus U18	BLR-2	21	—	—	—	—	—	—	2.28	.910	—	—	—	—	—	—	—	—
2019–20	Belarus U20	BLR-2	14	—	—	—	—	—	—	2.10	.930	—	—	—	—	—	—	—	—
2019–20	Dinamo Zubry Minsk	BLR-2	—	—	—	—	—	—	—	—	—	1	—	—	—	—	—	4.07	—
2020–21	Dinamo Minsk	KHL	9	3	5	1	513	23	1	2.69	.911	—	—	—	—	—	—	—	—
2020–21	Dinamo-Molodechno	BLR	12	—	—	—	—	—	—	2.23	.910	2	—	—	—	—	—	3.10	.890
2021–22	Dinamo Minsk	KHL	22	11	9	1	1261	61	1	2.90	.906	3	0	2	150	10	0	4.01	.880
2022–23	Dinamo Minsk	KHL	42	13	21	5	2379	101	0	2.55	.912	3	1	2	175	9	0	3.08	.917
2023–24	Dinamo Minsk	KHL	47	22	21	3	2609	104	4	2.39	.907	6	2	4	381	14	0	2.21	.925
2023–24	Lehigh Valley Phantoms	AHL	2	1	1	0	119	6	0	3.03	.885	—	—	—	—	—	—	—	—
2024–25	Lehigh Valley Phantoms	AHL	12	5	6	1	713	37	0	3.11	.884	—	—	—	—	—	—	—	—
2024–25	Philadelphia Flyers	NHL	17	5	9	1	902	54	0	3.59	.867	—	—	—	—	—	—	—	—
2025–26	Lehigh Valley Phantoms	AHL	38	15	21	2	2232	111	2	2.98	.895	—	—	—	—	—	—	—	—
2025–26	Philadelphia Flyers	NHL	4	0	2	0	120	8	0	4.00	.830	—	—	—	—	—	—	—	—
KHL totals			120	49	56	10	6,762	289	6	2.56	.909	12	3	8	705	33	0	2.81	.913
NHL totals			21	5	11	1	1022	62	0	3.64	.863	—	—	—	—	—	—	—	—

=== International ===
Year	Team	Event	GP	W	L	T	MIN	GA	SO	GAA	SV%
2019	Belarus	U18	4	1	0	0	136	12	0	5.30	.898
2020	Belarus	WJC-IA	3	2	1	0	161	4	0	1.49	.930
2021	Belarus	WC	4	0	2	0	216	15	0	4.17	.886
2022	Belarus	WJC-IA	5	5	0	0	300	8	0	1.60	.932
Junior totals			12	9	1	0	597	24	0	2.41	.903
Senior totals			4	0	2	0	216	15	0	4.17	.886
