= Vitali Pinchuk =

Belarussian ice hockey player

- Born: 11 January 2002 (age 24) Zhlobin, Belarus
- Height: 6 ft 3 in (191 cm)
- Weight: 203 lb (92 kg; 14 st 7 lb)
- Position: Center
- Shoots: Left
- NHL team Former teams: Nashville Predators; Dinamo Minsk
- NHL draft: Undrafted
- Playing career: 2020–present

Vitali Sergeevich Pinchuk (Belarusian: Віталь Сяргеевіч Пінчук; born 11 January 2002) is a Belarusian professional ice hockey center for the Nashville Predators of the National Hockey League (NHL).

== Playing career ==
Pinchuk played one year of major junior hockey in the Ontario Hockey League with the Kingston Frontenacs in the 2019–20 season before spending the next six seasons with HC Dinamo Minsk in the Kontinental Hockey League. On 27 April 2026, as an undrafted free agent, Pinchuk signed a one year, entry-level contract with the Nashville Predators. He played his first NHL game on 10 October 2026.

== Career statistics ==
=== Regular season and playoffs ===
			Regular season					Playoffs
Season	Team	League	GP	G	A	Pts	PIM	GP	G	A	Pts	PIM
2018–19	Team Belarus U18	Belarus2	23	2	8	10	6	—	—	—	—	—
2019–20	Kingston Frontenacs	OHL	54	13	21	34	12	—	—	—	—	—
2020–21	Metallurg Zhlobin	BXL	38	10	15	25	16	15	6	1	7	10
2020–21	Dinamo Minsk	KHL	5	0	0	0	0	—	—	—	—	—
2021–22	Dinamo Minsk	KHL	12	0	0	0	4	—	—	—	—	—
2021–22	Dinamo-Molodechno	BXL	25	12	10	22	8	—	—	—	—	—
2021–22	Metallurg Zhlobin	BXL	—	—	—	—	—	17	7	6	13	2
2022–23	Dinamo Minsk	KHL	61	8	6	14	18	6	2	2	4	0
2022–23	Metallurg Zhlobin	BXL	—	—	—	—	—	12	2	2	4	4
2023–24	Dinamo Minsk	KHL	43	9	13	22	10	3	0	0	0	0
2023–24	Metallurg Zhlobin	BXL	—	—	—	—	—	9	4	6	10	2
2024–25	Dinamo Minsk	KHL	66	25	18	43	24	11	5	6	11	2
2025–26	Dinamo Minsk	KHL	65	31	35	66	18	8	2	5	7	0
KHL totals			252	73	72	145	74	28	9	13	22	2

=== International ===
Year	Team	Event	Result	GP	G	A	Pts	PIM
2019	Belarus	U18	5th	5	2	1	3	0
2020	Belarus	WJC-D1	13th	5	2	2	4	0
2022	Belarus	WJC-D1	11th	5	2	6	8	4
Junior totals				15	6	9	15	4
