= 2023 World Junior Ice Hockey Championships – Division I =

International ice hockey tournament

2023 IIHF U20 World Championship Division I
Tournament details
- Host countries: Norway; Poland
- Venue(s): 2 (in 2 host cities)
- Dates: 11–17 December 2022
- Teams: 12

The 2023 IIHF U20 World Championship Division I was a pair of international under-20 ice hockey tournaments organized by the International Ice Hockey Federation. Division I consisted of two tiered groups of six teams each: the second-tier Division I A and the third-tier Division I B. For each tier's tournament, the first-placed team was promoted to a higher division, while the last-placed team was relegated to a lower division.

To be eligible as a junior player in these tournaments, a player couldn't be born earlier than 2003.

== Division I A ==
2023 IIHF U20 World Championship Division I A

Tournament details
- Host country: Norway
- City: Asker
- Venue(s): 1 (in 1 host city)
- Dates: 11–17 December 2022
- Teams: 6

Tournament statistics
- Games played: 15
- Goals scored: 91 (6.07 per game)
- Attendance: 7,785 (519 per game)
- Scoring leader(s): (Hungary) Zétény Hadobás (11 points)

Official website
- www.iihf.com

The Division I A tournament was played in Asker, Norway, from 11 to 17 December 2022.

=== Participating teams ===
Team	Qualification
Norway	hosts; placed 3rd in Division I A last year
Kazakhstan	placed 4th in Division I A last year
Denmark	placed 5th in Division I A last year
Hungary	placed 6th in Division I A last year
France	placed 1st in Division I B last year and were promoted
Slovenia	placed 2nd in Division I B last year and were promoted

=== Match officials ===
Seven referees and seven linesmen were selected for the tournament.

Referees

- (France) Pierre Dehaen
- (Denmark) Niclas Lundsgaard
- (Canada) Mark Pearce
- (Norway) Christian Persson
- (Slovenia) Gregor Rezek
- (Hungary) Daniel Soós
- (United States) Jack Young

Linesmen

- (Latvia) Renārs Davidonis
- (Norway) Christopher Dehn
- (Germany) Tim Heffner
- (Norway) Herman Johansen
- (Latvia) Davids Rozitis
- (United States) Christopher Williams
- (France) Vincent Zede

=== Final standings ===
Pos	Team	Pld	W	OTW	OTL	L	GF	GA	GD	Pts	Promotion or relegation
1	Norway (H)	5	5	0	0	0	19	8	+11	15	Promoted to the 2024 Top Division
2	Kazakhstan	5	3	0	0	2	14	11	+3	9	
3	France	5	2	0	1	2	16	14	+2	7	
4	Hungary	5	1	1	1	2	18	18	0	6	
5	Denmark	5	1	1	0	3	9	19	−10	5	
6	Slovenia	5	1	0	0	4	15	21	−6	3	Relegated to the 2024 Division I B

Source: IIHF
Rules for classification: 1) points; 2) head-to-head points; 3) head-to-head goal difference; 4) head-to-head number of goals scored; 5) result against closest best-ranked team outside tied teams; 6) result against second-best-ranked team outside tied teams; 7) seeding before tournament.
(H) Host

=== Match results ===
All times are local (Central European Time – UTC+1).

11 December 2022; 13:00	Hungary	2–3 OT (0–1, 1–0, 1–1) (OT: 0–1)	Denmark	Risenga Ishall, Asker; Attendance: 110

Game reference
Levente Hegedüs	Goalies	Kristers Steinbergs	Referees: (France) Pierre Dehaen (Norway) Christian Persson; Linesmen: (Latvia) Renārs Davidonis (United States) Christopher Williams
32	Shots	33	Referees: (France) Pierre Dehaen (Norway) Christian Persson; Linesmen: (Latvia) Renārs Davidonis (United States) Christopher Williams

11 December 2022; 16:30	Slovenia	0–4 (0–0, 0–2, 0–2)	Norway	Risenga Ishall, Asker; Attendance: 1,750

Game reference
Luka Kolin	Goalies	Markus Røhnebæk Stensrud	Referees: (Canada) Mark Pearce (United States) Jack Young; Linesmen: (Germany) Tim Heffner (France) Vincent Zede
14	Shots	44	Referees: (Canada) Mark Pearce (United States) Jack Young; Linesmen: (Germany) Tim Heffner (France) Vincent Zede

11 December 2022; 20:00	France	2–0 (1–0, 0–0, 1–0)	Kazakhstan	Risenga Ishall, Asker; Attendance: 85

Game reference
Antoine Keller	Goalies	Roman Shefer	Referees: (Denmark) Niclas Lundsgaard (Slovenia) Gregor Rezek; Linesmen: (Norway) Christopher Dehn (Norway) Herman Johansen
29	Shots	28	Referees: (Denmark) Niclas Lundsgaard (Slovenia) Gregor Rezek; Linesmen: (Norway) Christopher Dehn (Norway) Herman Johansen

12 December 2022; 13:00	Denmark	1–6 (1–1, 0–3, 0–2)	Slovenia	Risenga Ishall, Asker; Attendance: 139

Game reference
Kristers Steinbergs	Goalies	Luka Kolin	Referees: (Hungary) Daniel Soós (United States) Jack Young; Linesmen: (Germany) Tim Heffner (Latvia) Davids Rozitis
31	Shots	29	Referees: (Hungary) Daniel Soós (United States) Jack Young; Linesmen: (Germany) Tim Heffner (Latvia) Davids Rozitis

12 December 2022; 16:30	Kazakhstan	3–2 (0–0, 0–2, 3–0)	Hungary	Risenga Ishall, Asker; Attendance: 114

Game reference
Roman Shefer	Goalies	Levente Hegedüs	Referees: (France) Pierre Dehaen (Denmark) Niclas Lundsgaard; Linesmen: (Norway) Christopher Dehn (France) Vincent Zede
30	Shots	25	Referees: (France) Pierre Dehaen (Denmark) Niclas Lundsgaard; Linesmen: (Norway) Christopher Dehn (France) Vincent Zede

12 December 2022; 20:00	Norway	3–2 (1–0, 1–1, 1–1)	France	Risenga Ishall, Asker; Attendance: 954

Game reference
Markus Røhnebæk Stensrud	Goalies	Antoine Keller	Referees: (Canada) Mark Pearce (Slovenia) Gregor Rezek; Linesmen: (Latvia) Renārs Davidonis (United States) Christopher Williams
33	Shots	29	Referees: (Canada) Mark Pearce (Slovenia) Gregor Rezek; Linesmen: (Latvia) Renārs Davidonis (United States) Christopher Williams

14 December 2022; 13:00	Slovenia	2–5 (1–2, 1–2, 0–1)	France	Risenga Ishall, Asker

Game reference
Luka Kolin; Jakob Župančič	Goalies	Antoine Keller	Referees: (Denmark) Niclas Lundsgaard (Hungary) Daniel Soós; Linesmen: (Norway) Herman Johansen (Latvia) Davids Rozitis
16	Shots	42	Referees: (Denmark) Niclas Lundsgaard (Hungary) Daniel Soós; Linesmen: (Norway) Herman Johansen (Latvia) Davids Rozitis

14 December 2022; 16:30	Norway	3–2 (0–1, 1–0, 2–1)	Hungary	Risenga Ishall, Asker

Game reference
Markus Røhnebæk Stensrud	Goalies	Tamas Antek
38	Shots	23

14 December 2022; 20:00	Kazakhstan	4–0 (1–0, 2–0, 1–0)	Denmark	Risenga Ishall, Asker

Game reference

15 December 2022; 13:00	France	4–5 GWS (2–2, 2–0, 0–2) (OT: 0–0) (SO: 0–1)	Hungary	Risenga Ishall, Asker; Attendance: 137

Game reference
Martin Neckar	Goalies	Levente Hegedüs	Referees: (Denmark) Niclas Lundsgaard (Norway) Christian Persson; Linesmen: (Norway) Christopher Dehn (Latvia) Davids Rozitis
10 min	Penalties	4 min	Referees: (Denmark) Niclas Lundsgaard (Norway) Christian Persson; Linesmen: (Norway) Christopher Dehn (Latvia) Davids Rozitis
27	Shots	37	Referees: (Denmark) Niclas Lundsgaard (Norway) Christian Persson; Linesmen: (Norway) Christopher Dehn (Latvia) Davids Rozitis

15 December 2022; 16:30	Kazakhstan	4–2 (2–0, 1–1, 1–1)	Slovenia	Risenga Ishall, Asker; Attendance: 139

Game reference
Roman Shefer	Goalies	Jakob Župančič; Luka Kolin	Referees: (France) Pierre Dehaen (United States) Jack Young; Linesmen: (Latvia) Renārs Davidonis (Norway) Herman Johansen
2 min	Penalties	4 min	Referees: (France) Pierre Dehaen (United States) Jack Young; Linesmen: (Latvia) Renārs Davidonis (Norway) Herman Johansen
29	Shots	29	Referees: (France) Pierre Dehaen (United States) Jack Young; Linesmen: (Latvia) Renārs Davidonis (Norway) Herman Johansen

15 December 2022; 20:00	Denmark	1–4 (0–2, 0–1, 1–1)	Norway	Risenga Ishall, Asker; Attendance: 1498

Game reference
Kristers Seinbergs	Goalies	Markus Røhnebæk Stensrud	Referees: (Canada) Mark Pearce (Hungary) Daniel Soós; Linesmen: (Germany) Tim Heffner (United States) Christopher Williams
8 min	Penalties	4 min	Referees: (Canada) Mark Pearce (Hungary) Daniel Soós; Linesmen: (Germany) Tim Heffner (United States) Christopher Williams
19	Shots	33	Referees: (Canada) Mark Pearce (Hungary) Daniel Soós; Linesmen: (Germany) Tim Heffner (United States) Christopher Williams

17 December 2022; 13:00	Hungary	7–5 (1–2, 3–1, 3–2)	Slovenia	Risenga Ishall, Asker

Game reference
27	Shots	31

17 December 2022; 16:30	Denmark	4–3 (1–1, 1–1, 2–1)	France	Risenga Ishall, Asker

Game reference
25	Shots	29

17 December 2022; 20:00	Norway	5–3 (1–0, 3–2, 1–1)	Kazakhstan	Risenga Ishall, Asker

Game reference
28	Shots	26

=== Statistics ===
==== Top 10 scorers ====
Pos	Player	Country	GP	G	A	Pts	+/–	PIM
1	Zétény Hadobás	Hungary	5	1	10	11	+2	2
2	Bence Horváth	Hungary	5	4	3	7	+1	0
3	Matias Bachelet	France	5	2	5	7	+2	0
3	Petter Vesterheim	Norway	5	2	5	7	+6	0
5	Nal Brodnik	Slovenia	5	3	3	6	0	2
6	Nace Langus	Slovenia	5	2	4	6	+1	2
7	Emil Tavernier	France	5	4	1	5	+4	4
7	Roman Yermak	Kazakhstan	5	4	1	5	+6	2
9	Vsevolod Logvin	Kazakhstan	5	3	2	5	+7	4
9	Balázs Varga	Hungary	5	3	2	5	+2	2

GP = Games played; G = Goals; A = Assists; Pts = Points; +/− = P Plus–minus; PIM = Penalties In Minutes
Source: IIHF

==== Goaltending leaders ====
(minimum 40% team's total ice time)

Pos	Player	Country	TOI	GA	Sv%	GAA	SO
1	Roman Shefer	Kazakhstan	269:56	9	92.80	2.00	1
2	Markus Røhnebæk Stensrud	Norway	300:00	8	92.79	1.60	1
3	Antoine Keller	France	238:02	8	92.08	2.02	0
4	Luka Kolin	Slovenia	238:35	16	87.88	4.02	0
5	Levente Hegedüs	Hungary	246:21	15	87.60	3.65	0

TOI = Time on ice (minutes:seconds); GA = Goals against; GAA = Goals against average; Sv% = Save percentage; SO = Shutouts
Source: IIHF

==== Best Players Selected by the Directorate ====
- Goaltender: (Norway) Markus Røhnebæk Stensrud
- Defenceman: (Hungary) Zétény Hadobás
- Forward: (France) Matias Bachelet

Source: IIHF

== Division I B ==
2023 IIHF U20 World Championship Division I B

Tournament details
- Host country: Poland
- City: Bytom
- Venue(s): 1 (in 1 host city)
- Dates: 11–17 December 2022
- Teams: 6

Tournament statistics
- Games played: 15
- Goals scored: 104 (6.93 per game)
- Attendance: 6,350 (423 per game)
- Scoring leader(s): (Poland) Krzysztof Maciaś (10 points)

Official website
- www.iihf.com

The Division I B tournament was played in Bytom, Poland, from 11 to 17 December 2022.

=== Participating teams ===
Team	Qualification
Japan	placed 3rd in Division I B last year
Ukraine	placed 4th in Division I B last year
Estonia	placed 5th in Division I B last year
Poland	hosts; placed 6th in Division I B last year
Italy	placed 1st in Division II A last year and were promoted
South Korea	placed 2nd in Division II A last year and were promoted

=== Match officials ===
Seven referees and seven linesmen were selected for the tournament.

Referees

- (Austria) Andreas Huber
- (Slovakia) Juraj Konč
- (Poland) Paweł Kosidło
- (Canada) Troy Murray
- (Czech Republic) Jiří Ondráček
- (Italy) Omar Piniè
- (Kazakhstan) Vladimir Yefremov

Linesmen

- (Austria) Sebastian Bedynek
- (Kazakhstan) Timur Iskakov
- (Slovakia) Peter Jedlička
- (Hungary) Barna Kis-Király
- (Poland) Mateusz Kucharewicz
- (Poland) Andrzej Nenko
- (France) Quentin Ugolini

=== Final standings ===
Pos	Team	Pld	W	OTW	OTL	L	GF	GA	GD	Pts	Promotion or relegation
1	Japan	5	4	0	1	0	25	16	+9	13	Promoted to the 2024 Division I A
2	Ukraine	5	4	0	0	1	23	12	+11	12	
3	Italy	5	2	1	0	2	12	13	−1	8	
4	Poland (H)	5	1	1	0	3	21	19	+2	5	
5	Estonia	5	1	0	1	3	11	14	−3	4	
6	South Korea	5	1	0	0	4	12	30	−18	3	Relegated to the 2024 Division II A

Source: IIHF
Rules for classification: 1) points; 2) head-to-head points; 3) head-to-head goal difference; 4) head-to-head number of goals scored; 5) result against closest best-ranked team outside tied teams; 6) result against second-best-ranked team outside tied teams; 7) seeding before tournament.
(H) Host

=== Match results ===
All times are local (Central European Time – UTC+1).

11 December 2022; 13:00	South Korea	3–5 (2–1, 0–4, 1–0)	Japan	Nikodemowicz Brothers Ice Rink, Bytom; Attendance: 70

Game reference
Jaewon Song	Goalies	Issa Otsuka	Referees: (Austria) Andreas Huber (Canada) Troy Murray; Linesmen: (Austria) Sebastian Bedynek (Hungary) Barna Kis-Király
19	Shots	40	Referees: (Austria) Andreas Huber (Canada) Troy Murray; Linesmen: (Austria) Sebastian Bedynek (Hungary) Barna Kis-Király

11 December 2022; 16:30	Poland	4–3 OT (0–0, 3–2, 0–1) (OT: 1–0)	Estonia	Nikodemowicz Brothers Ice Rink, Bytom; Attendance: 1,000

Game reference
Mikolaj Szczepkowski	Goalies	Fjodor Aganezovs	Referees: (Italy) Omar Piniè (Kazakhstan) Vladimir Yefremov; Linesmen: (Kazakhstan) Timur Iskakov (France) Quentin Ugolini
25	Shots	23	Referees: (Italy) Omar Piniè (Kazakhstan) Vladimir Yefremov; Linesmen: (Kazakhstan) Timur Iskakov (France) Quentin Ugolini

11 December 2022; 20:00	Italy	0–4 (0–0, 0–3, 0–1)	Ukraine	Nikodemowicz Brothers Ice Rink, Bytom; Attendance: 120

Game reference
Damian Clara	Goalies	Savva Serdiuk	Referees: (Slovakia) Juraj Konč (Czech Republic) Jiří Ondráček; Linesmen: (Slovakia) Peter Jedlička (Poland) Andrzej Nenko
11	Shots	35	Referees: (Slovakia) Juraj Konč (Czech Republic) Jiří Ondráček; Linesmen: (Slovakia) Peter Jedlička (Poland) Andrzej Nenko

12 December 2022; 13:00	Estonia	1–2 (1–0, 0–2, 0–0)	South Korea	Nikodemowicz Brothers Ice Rink, Bytom; Attendance: 100

Game reference
Henrik Virro	Goalies	Jaewon Song	Referees: (Slovakia) Juraj Konč (Czech Republic) Jiří Ondráček; Linesmen: (Slovakia) Peter Jedlička (Poland) Andrzej Nenko
30	Shots	24	Referees: (Slovakia) Juraj Konč (Czech Republic) Jiří Ondráček; Linesmen: (Slovakia) Peter Jedlička (Poland) Andrzej Nenko

12 December 2022; 16:30	Ukraine	5–2 (2–0, 1–2, 2–0)	Poland	Nikodemowicz Brothers Ice Rink, Bytom; Attendance: 1,000

Game reference
Savva Serdiuk	Goalies	Szymon Klimowski	Referees: (Austria) Andreas Huber (Canada) Troy Murray; Linesmen: (Austria) Sebastian Bedynek (Hungary) Barna Kis-Király
28	Shots	26	Referees: (Austria) Andreas Huber (Canada) Troy Murray; Linesmen: (Austria) Sebastian Bedynek (Hungary) Barna Kis-Király

12 December 2022; 20:00	Japan	2–3 OT (1–1, 1–0, 0–1) (OT: 0–1)	Italy	Nikodemowicz Brothers Ice Rink, Bytom; Attendance: 60

Game reference
Issa Tamura	Goalies	Damian Clara	Referees: (Poland) Paweł Kosidło (Kazakhstan) Vladimir Yefremov; Linesmen: (Kazakhstan) Timur Iskakov (Poland) Mateusz Kucharewicz
32	Shots	29	Referees: (Poland) Paweł Kosidło (Kazakhstan) Vladimir Yefremov; Linesmen: (Kazakhstan) Timur Iskakov (Poland) Mateusz Kucharewicz

14 December 2022; 13:00	South Korea	4–6 (1–0, 1–3, 2–3)	Italy	Nikodemowicz Brothers Ice Rink, Bytom; Attendance: 60

Game reference
Jaewon Song; Taeyang Lim	Goalies	Damian Clara	Referees: (Austria) Andreas Huber (Slovakia) Juraj Konč; Linesmen: (Hungary) Barna Kis-Király (France) Quentin Ugolini
29	Shots	30	Referees: (Austria) Andreas Huber (Slovakia) Juraj Konč; Linesmen: (Hungary) Barna Kis-Király (France) Quentin Ugolini

14 December 2022; 16:30	Japan	7–3 (1–1, 3–1, 3–1)	Poland	Nikodemowicz Brothers Ice Rink, Bytom; Attendance: 980

Game reference
Issa Otsuka; Issa Tamura	Goalies	Mikolaj Szczepkowski
53	Shots	30

14 December 2022; 20:00	Ukraine	3–2 (1–0, 0–2, 2–0)	Estonia	Nikodemowicz Brothers Ice Rink, Bytom; Attendance: 90

Game reference

16 December 2022; 13:00	Estonia	3–4 (1–1, 2–2, 0–1)	Japan	Nikodemowicz Brothers Ice Rink, Bytom; Attendance: 60

Game reference
27	Shots	47

16 December 2022; 16:30	Italy	2–1 (0–0, 1–0, 1–1)	Poland	Nikodemowicz Brothers Ice Rink, Bytom; Attendance: 870

Game reference
Damian Clara	Goalies	Mikolaj Szczepkowski
12 min	Penalties	12 min
21	Shots	33

16 December 2022; 20:00	Ukraine	7–1 (1–0, 3–1, 3–0)	South Korea	Nikodemowicz Brothers Ice Rink, Bytom; Attendance: 120

Game reference

17 December 2022; 13:00	Estonia	2–1 (0–0, 2–1, 0–0)	Italy	Nikodemowicz Brothers Ice Rink, Bytom; Attendance: 70

Game reference
27	Shots	30

17 December 2022; 16:30	Poland	11–2 (3–0, 4–1, 4–1)	South Korea	Nikodemowicz Brothers Ice Rink, Bytom; Attendance: 1,000

Game reference
35	Shots	21

17 December 2022; 20:00	Japan	7–4 (1–1, 4–0, 2–3)	Ukraine	Nikodemowicz Brothers Ice Rink, Bytom; Attendance: 750

Game reference
31	Shots	23

=== Statistics ===
==== Top 10 scorers ====
Pos	Player	Country	GP	G	A	Pts	+/–	PIM
1	Krzysztof Maciaś	Poland	5	7	3	10	+4	4
2	Kotaro Murase	Japan	5	2	8	10	+3	0
3	Rukia Morita	Japan	5	5	3	8	+2	0
4	Alessandro Segafredo	Italy	5	4	4	8	+7	2
5	Yuto Taneichi	Japan	5	1	7	8	+2	10
6	Kacper Maciaś	Poland	5	1	6	7	+4	6
7	KIm Sangyeob	South Korea	5	5	1	6	–7	6
8	Mykyta Sydorenko	Ukraine	5	4	2	6	+5	8
9	Tommy Purdeller	Italy	5	1	5	6	+5	8
10	Junya Owa	Japan	5	1	5	6	+1	10

GP = Games played; G = Goals; A = Assists; Pts = Points; +/− = P Plus–minus; PIM = Penalties In Minutes
Source: IIHF

==== Goaltending leaders ====
(minimum 40% team's total ice time)

Pos	Player	Country	TOI	GA	Sv%	GAA	SO
1	Damian Clara	Italy	302:51	13	91.67	2.58	0
2	Fjodor Aganezov	Estonia	240:26	12	91.24	2.99	0
3	Hlib Artsatbanov	Ukraine	123:03	5	89.13	2.44	0
4	Savva Serdiuk	Ukraine	176:57	7	88.71	2.37	1
5	Mikołaj Szczepkowski	Poland	222:31	13	88.29	3.51	0

TOI = Time on ice (minutes:seconds); GA = Goals against; GAA = Goals against average; Sv% = Save percentage; SO = Shutouts
Source: IIHF

==== Best Players Selected by the Directorate ====
- Goaltender: (Italy) Damian Clara
- Defenceman: (Japan) Junya Owa
- Forward: (Ukraine) Danylo Korzhyletsky

Source: IIHF
