= Kazakhstan men's national junior ice hockey team =

Kazakhstan
- Association: Kazakhstan Ice Hockey Federation
- General manager: (Kazakhstan) Alexander Koreshkov
- Head coach: (Kazakhstan) Sergei Starygin
- Captain: Yuri Sergiyenko
- Most games: Sergi Alexandrov (23)
- Most points: Roman Fadin (30)
- Team colors
- IIHF code: KAZ

First international
- Kazakhstan 4–0 Belarus (Riga, Latvia; 10 November 1992)

Biggest win
- Kazakhstan 18–0 Yugoslavia (Tallinn, Estonia; 2 January 1995)

Biggest defeat
- Canada 15–0 Kazakhstan (Ottawa, Canada; 28 December 2008)

IIHF World U20 Championship
- Appearances: 29 (first in 1993)
- Best result: 6th (1999)

International record (W–L–T)
- 58–57–8

The Kazakh men's national junior ice hockey team is the national under-20 ice hockey team representing Kazakhstan in international under-20 ice hockey competition organized by the International Ice Hockey Federation (IIHF). The team has represented Kazakhstan at the World Junior Hockey Championship, most frequently in Division I, but also at the top championship level nine times, first in 1998 and most recently in 2025.

== History ==
Kazakhstan began international junior competition in 1992 after the dissolution of the Soviet Union national junior team. Kazakhstan was promoted to the top division for the first time for the 1998 World Junior Ice Hockey Championships, hosted in Helsinki, Finland. There the Kazakhs defeated Slovakia 5–2 to earn a spot in the quarterfinals. However, a 14–1 loss to eventual gold-medalists Finland sent Kazakhstan to the placement games, where they stunned observers by defeating five-time defending champion Canada 6–3 to finish 7th at the tournament.

Led by captain Nikolai Antropov, the Kazakhstan team remained at the top level for the 1999 World Junior tournament in Winnipeg, Canada. Kazakhstan tied Belarus 2–2 and defeated Switzerland 3–0 to finish third in their group, and went on to play Canada in the quarterfinals, losing 12–2. Kazakhstan finished 6th in the tournament. The following year, Kazakhstan managed another group stage victory, this time over Ukraine, before falling to the Czech Republic 6–3 in the quarterfinals and finishing 8th. The team made a fourth consecutive appearance at the top level in the 2001 tournament, where the team was winless and relegated to Division I.

Kazakhstan next returned to the top level for the 2008 World Junior Championships in Liberec, Czech Republic. The team wore only their white jerseys during the tournament with their blue jerseys were missing. Kazakhstan defeated Switzerland 3–1 and Denmark 6–3 en route to an 8th place finish. The team was relegated again at the 2009 tournament in Ottawa, Canada, where they suffered their largest defeat at the top level, losing 15–0 against the Canadians.

Kazakhstan again played at the top level for the 2019 and 2020 tournaments, but failed to win any games outside of the relegation round. The team made its latest appearance at the top level at the 2025 World Junior Championships, again hosted in Ottawa. There they earned their first point at the top tournament since 2008 during a 5–4 overtime loss against Slovakia. However, they were again demoted after being defeated 4–3 by Germany in the relegation game.

== Tournament results ==
- 1993 – 2nd in Pool C, qualification group 2
- 1994 – 25th overall (3rd in Pool C qualification)
- 1995 – 25th overall (1st in Pool C2)
- 1996 – 19th overall (1st in Pool C)
- 1997 – 11th overall (1st in Pool B)
- 1998 – 7th overall
- 1999 – 6th overall
- 2000 – 8th overall
- 2001 – 10th overall
- 2002 – 15th overall (5th in Division I)
- 2003 – 15th overall (3rd in Division I Group A)
- 2004 – 19th overall (5th in Division I Group A)
- 2005 – 13th overall (2nd in Division I Group A)
- 2006 – 13th overall (2nd in Division I Group B)
- 2007 – 11th overall (1st in Division I Group B)
- 2008 – 8th overall
- 2009 – 10th overall
- 2010 – 17th overall (4th in Division I Group B)
- 2011 – 18th overall (4th in Division I Group B)
- 2012 – 18th overall (2nd in Division IB)
- 2013 – 18th overall (2nd in Division IB)
- 2014 – 18th overall (2nd in Division IB)
- 2015 – 17th overall (1st in Division IB)
- 2016 – 13th overall (3rd in Division IA)
- 2017 – 14th overall (4th in Division IA)
- 2018 – 11th overall (1st in Division IA)
- 2019 – 9th overall
- 2020 – 10th overall
- 2021 – Division I tournament cancelled
- 2022 – 14th overall (4th in Division IA)
- 2023 – 12th overall (2nd in Division IA)
- 2024 – 11th overall (1st in Division IA)
- 2025 – 10th overall
- 2026 – 12th overall (2nd in Division IA)
