= Jules Boscq =

French ice hockey player (born 2004)

- Born: 22 February 2002 (age 24) Bordeaux, France
- Height: 183 cm (6 ft 0 in)
- Weight: 81 kg (179 lb; 12 st 11 lb)
- Position: Defenceman
- Shoots: Left
- LM team Former teams: Boxers de Bordeaux; Anglet Hormadi Élite; Iowa Heartlanders; HPK
- National team: France
- NHL draft: Undrafted
- Playing career: 2019–present

Jules Boscq (born 22 February 2002) is a French professional ice hockey player who is a defenceman for Boxers de Bordeaux of Ligue Magnus.

== Playing career ==
Boscq signed with the Iowa Heartlanders on 15 August 2023. Four games into the 2023–24 season, he was suspended for the remainder of the season for a failed performance-enhancing drug test in 2021. He re-signed with the Heartlanders on 9 July 2024. On 25 March 2025, he signed a professional try-out contract with the Iowa Wild.

== International play ==
Boscq represented the France national team at the 2026 Winter Olympics and the 2023 and 2025 IIHF World Championship.

== Career statistics ==
=== Regular season and playoffs ===
			Regular season					Playoffs
Season	Team	League	GP	G	A	Pts	PIM	GP	G	A	Pts	PIM
2017–18	Anglet U20	France U20	19	4	8	12	18	2	2	0	2	0
2018–19	Anglet U20	France U20	18	1	6	7	30	—	—	—	—	—
2019–20	Anglet U20	France U20	22	11	12	23	38	2	2	2	4	6
2019–20	Anglet II	France4	9	6	5	11	16	1	1	1	2	2
2019–20	Anglet	Ligue Magnus	1	0	0	0	0	—	—	—	—	—
2020–21	Anglet U20	France U20	2	1	2	3	2	—	—	—	—	—
2020–21	Anglet	Ligue Magnus	23	2	7	9	6	—	—	—	—	—
2021–22	Bordeaux U20	France U20	2	1	0	1	0	—	—	—	—	—
2021–22	Bordeaux II	France4	1	1	0	1	0	—	—	—	—	—
2021–22	Bordeaux	Ligue Magnus	40	2	6	8	22	4	0	0	0	4
2022–23	Bordeaux	Ligue Magnus	44	5	22	27	18	4	0	2	2	2
2023–24	Iowa Heartlanders	ECHL	4	0	2	2	4	—	—	—	—	—
2024–25	Iowa Heartlanders	ECHL	65	8	21	29	48	7	1	1	2	2
2025–26	HPK	Liiga	24	2	3	5	6	—	—	—	—	—
2025–26	Bordeaux	Ligue Magnus	7	0	2	2	6	14	0	7	7	2
Ligue Magnus totals			115	9	37	46	52	22	0	9	9	8
ECHL totals			69	8	23	31	52	7	1	1	2	2

=== International ===
Year	Team	Event	GP	G	A	Pts	PIM
2019	France U18	WJC-18 (D1A)	5	0	0	0	6
2020	France U20	WJC-20 (D1B)	5	0	1	1	4
2022	France U20	WJC-20 (D1B)	5	0	2	2	2
2023	France	WC	7	0	1	1	2
2025	France	WC	7	0	1	1	2
2026	France	OG	4	0	0	0	0
2026	France	WC (D1A)	5	0	1	1	0
Junior totals			15	0	3	3	12
Senior totals			23	0	3	3	4
