= Anrī Ravinskis =

Latvian ice hockey player (born 2003)

- Born: January 2, 2003 (age 23) Rīga, Latvia
- Height: 193 cm (6 ft 4 in)
- Weight: 94 kg (207 lb; 14 st 11 lb)
- Position: Forward
- Shoots: Left
- AHL team: Abbotsford Canucks
- National team: Latvia

Anrī Ravinskis (born 2 January, 2003) is a Latvian ice hockey placer who plays for American Hockey League team the Abbotsford Canucks as a part of the Vancouver Canucks system. He competed for Latvia at the 2026 Winter Olympics.
