= Ole Julian Bjørgvik-Holm =

Norwegian ice hockey player (born 2002)

- Bjørgvik-Holm in 2026
- Born: 23 May 2002 (age 24) Oslo, Norway
- Height: 6 ft 3 in (191 cm)
- Weight: 194 lb (88 kg; 13 st 12 lb)
- Position: Defence
- Shoots: Left
- ICEHL team Former teams: Graz99ers; Manglerud Star Ishockey; Cleveland Monsters
- National team: Norway
- NHL draft: 145th overall, 2020; Columbus Blue Jackets
- Playing career: 2020–present

Ole Julian Bjørgvik-Holm (born 23 May 2002) is a Norwegian professional ice hockey player who is currently under contract with the Graz99ers of the ICE Hockey League (ICEHL). Internationally he has played for the Norwegian national team at the 2021 World Championships.

== Playing career ==
Bjørgvik-Holm played junior hockey for the Mississauga Steelheads of the Ontario Hockey League (OHL). He was drafted 145th overall in the 2020 NHL entry draft by the Columbus Blue Jackets and signed an entry-level contract on 16 August 2021.

Following the completion of his entry-level contract with the Blue Jackets, Bjørgvik-Holm opted to continue his tenure within the organization by agreeing to a one-year AHL contract with affiliate, the Cleveland Monsters, on 22 July 2025.

Having left the Blue Jackets organization after four full professional seasons, Bjørgvik-Holm returned to Europe in signing a contract with Austrian based club, Graz99ers of the ICE Hockey League, on 7 August 2026.

== International play ==
Bjørgvik-Holm played 6 games at the 2021 World Championships.

== Career statistics ==
=== Regular season and playoffs ===
			Regular season					Playoffs
Season	Team	League	GP	G	A	Pts	PIM	GP	G	A	Pts	PIM
2017–18	Manglerud Star	U20	15	0	1	1	8	—	—	—	—	—
2018–19	Colorado Thunderbirds 16U AAA	T1EHL	26	10	10	20	20	—	—	—	—	—
2018–19	Tri-City Storm	USHL	2	0	0	0	0	—	—	—	—	—
2019–20	Mississauga Steelheads	OHL	57	2	17	19	47	—	—	—	—	—
2020–21	Manglerud Star	NOR	22	2	8	10	14	—	—	—	—	—
2020–21	Cleveland Monsters	AHL	16	1	4	5	8	—	—	—	—	—
2021–22	Mississauga Steelheads	OHL	54	3	10	13	82	10	1	0	1	4
2022–23	Cleveland Monsters	AHL	25	0	2	2	6	—	—	—	—	—
2022–23	Kalamazoo Wings	ECHL	19	1	3	4	23	—	—	—	—	—
2023–24	Cincinnati Cyclones	ECHL	57	5	28	33	38	—	—	—	—	—
2023–24	Cleveland Monsters	AHL	2	0	0	0	0	—	—	—	—	—
2024–25	Cleveland Monsters	AHL	44	3	4	7	50	6	0	0	0	2
2025–26	Cleveland Monsters	AHL	34	0	3	3	10	1	0	0	0	0
NOR totals			22	2	8	10	14	—	—	—	—	—
AHL totals			121	4	13	17	74	7	0	0	0	2

=== International ===
Year	Team	Event	Result	GP	G	A	Pts	PIM
2018	Norway	WJC18-D1	15th	5	1	0	1	2
2019	Norway	WJC18-D1	14th	5	0	0	0	4
2021	Norway	WC	13th	6	0	0	0	2
2022	Norway	WJC-D1	13th	5	2	4	6	0
2023	Norway	WC	13th	4	1	0	1	0
Junior totals				15	3	4	7	6
Senior totals				10	1	0	1	2
