= 2024 World Junior Ice Hockey Championships – Division I =

International ice hockey tournament

2024 IIHF U20 World Championship Division I
Tournament details
- Host countries: Hungary; Slovenia
- Venues: 2 (in 2 host cities)
- Dates: 10–17 December 2023
- Teams: 12

The 2024 World Junior Ice Hockey Championship Division I competitions were two international under-20 ice hockey tournaments organized by the International Ice Hockey Federation. It consisted of two tiered groups of six teams each: the second-tier Division I A and the third-tier Division I B. For each tier's tournament, the first-placed team was promoted to the next higher division, while the bottom-placed team was relegated to a lower division.

To be eligible as a junior player in these tournaments, a player couldn't be born earlier than 2004.

== Division I A ==
2024 IIHF U20 World Championship Division I A

Tournament details
- Host country: Hungary
- City: Budapest
- Venue: 1 (in 1 host city)
- Dates: 10–16 December 2023
- Teams: 6

Tournament statistics
- Games played: 15
- Goals scored: 104 (6.93 per game)
- Attendance: 5,887 (392 per game)
- Scoring leader: (Denmark) Albert Schioldan (8 points)

Official website
- www.iihf.com

The Division I A tournament was played in Budapest, Hungary, from 10 to 16 December 2023.

=== Participants ===
Team	Qualification
Austria	placed 10th in the Top Division last year and were relegated
Kazakhstan	placed 2nd in Division I A last year
France	placed 3rd in Division I A last year
Hungary	placed 4th in Division I A last year
Denmark	placed 5th in Division I A last year
Japan	placed 1st in Division I B last year and were promoted

=== Standings ===
Pos	Team	Pld	W	OTW	OTL	L	GF	GA	GD	Pts	Promotion or relegation
1	Kazakhstan	5	4	0	1	0	21	12	+9	13	Promoted to the 2025 Top Division
2	France	5	3	0	0	2	18	19	−1	9 (Note: Denmark 4–6 France)	
3	Denmark	5	3	0	0	2	18	14	+4	9	
4	Austria	5	2	1	0	2	22	21	+1	8	
5	Hungary (H)	5	1	0	1	3	13	16	−3	4	
6	Japan	5	0	1	0	4	12	22	−10	2	Relegated to the 2025 Division I B

Source: IIHF
Rules for classification: 1) points; 2) head-to-head points; 3) head-to-head goal difference; 4) head-to-head number of goals scored; 5) result against closest best-ranked team outside tied teams; 6) result against second-best-ranked team outside tied teams; 7) seeding before tournament.
(H) Host

=== Results ===
All times are local (UTC+2).

10 December 2023; 12:30	Denmark	4–6 (1–1, 1–1, 2–4)	France	Tüskecsarnok, Budapest; Attendance: 69

Game reference

Kristers Steinbergs
Goalies
Antoine Keller
Referees:
(Germany) Achim Mooseberger
(Sweden) Alexander Oesterberg
Linesmen:
(Canada) Brian Birkhoff
(Slovakia) Tomas Gegan

	0–1	17:33 –Perrenoud (Grossetete, Guidoux) (PP)
Mølgaard (Schioldan, Thomsen) – 19:41	1–1
	1–2	24:56 – Raveaud (Chapuis) (SH)
Marloth (Skov) – 37:18	2–2
	2–3	43:20 – Tournier
	2–4	45:47 – Chapuis (PP)
	2–5	54:58 – Grossetete (Dufour)
Andersen (Skovning, Stenbakken) – 57:38	3–5
Andersen (Stenbakken) (EA) – 58:59	4–5
	4–6	59:55 – Perrenoud (ENG)

6 min
Penalties
6 min
32
Shots
35

10 December 2023; 16:00	Hungary	2–5 (1–2, 1–0, 0–3)	Kazakhstan	Tüskecsarnok, Budapest; Attendance: 987

Game reference

Levente Hegedüs
Goalies
Vladimir Nikitin
Referees:
(Slovakia) Martin Jobbagy
(Austria) Christian Ofner
Linesmen:
(Switzerland) Dominik Altmann
(Denmark) Emil Dalsgaard

	0–1	03:36 – Nurkenov (Orazov, Kim)
	0–2	12:14 – Smoliyaninov (Yermak, Ospanov) (PP)
Mihalik (Dobos) – 13:26	1–2
Dobos (Hiezl, Bajko) – 38:16	2–2
	2–3	48:47 – Avdeyenko Nurkenov
	2–4	52:40 – Logvin (Khan, Yermak)
	2–5	57:13 – Logvin (SH)

8 min
Penalties
6 min
24
Shots
34

10 December 2023; 19:30	Japan	2–5 (1–2, 0–3, 1–0)	Austria	Tüskecsarnok, Budapest; Attendance: 125

Game reference

Issa Tamura
Sazuku Kudo
Goalies
Benedikt Oschgan
Referees:
(Hungary) Zsombor Palkovi
(Norway) Christian Persson
Linesmen:
(Poland) Michal Gerne
(Slovenia) Tadej Snoj

	0–1	08:44 – Scherzer (PP)
	0–2	17:28 – Lippitsch (Moosbrugger)
Maxner – 19:48	1–2
	1–3	34:28 – Erne (Summer, Moosbrugger)
	1–4	36:16 – Reiner (Wurzer, Söllinger)
	1–5	37:14 – Dobnig (Summer, Biber)
Ushio (Mori, Maxner) – 58:18	2–5

6 min
Penalties
2 min
16
Shots
36

11 December 2023; 12:30	France	5–3 (1–1, 1–2, 3–0)	Japan	Tüskecsarnok, Budapest; Attendance: 67

Game reference

Antoine Keller
Goalies
Issa Tamura
Referees:
(Poland) Michal Baca
(Austria) Christian Ofner
Linesmen:
(Switzerland) Dominik Altmann
(Hungary) Barna Kis-Karaly

Grossetete (Tavernier), Eyre) (PP) – 03:01	1–0
	1–1	16:07 – Maxner (Ushio, Mori) (PP)
Grossetete (Tavernier, Eyre) (PP) – 20:22	2–1
	2–2	20:59 – Maxner (Kokuwa)
	2–3	21:38 – Ushio (Kokuwa)
Brites (Cal, Perrenoud) – 47:23	3–3
Tavernier (Eyre, Perrenoud) – 51:54	4–3
Tavernier (Perrenoud, Addamo) (ENG) – 59:40	5–3

6 min
Penalties
10 min
36
Shots
29

11 December 2023; 16:00	Kazakhstan	3–2 (0–1, 0–0, 3–1)	Denmark	Tüskecsarnok, Budapest; Attendance: 114

Game reference

Vladimir Nikitin
Goalies
Kristers Steinbergs
Referees:
(Hungary) Zsombor Palkovi
(Norway) Christian Persson
Linesmen:
(Slovenia) Tadej Snoj
(Hungary) David Szabo

	0–1	15:13 – Mølgaard (Thomsen, Schioldan)
Orazov (Beisembayev, Nurkenov) – 44:57	1–1
	1–2	46:13 – Schioldan (Mølgaard, Thomsen)
Lyapunov (Shakshakbayev) – 48:40	2–2
Ospanov (Yermak) – 56:46	3–2

6 min
Penalties
10 min
29
Shots
31

11 December 2023; 19:30	Austria	3–2 (1–1, 1–1, 1–0)	Hungary	Tüskecsarnok, Budapest; Attendance: 801

Game reference

Benedikt Oschgan
Goalies
Levente Hegedüs
Referees:
(Slovakia) Martin Jobbagy
(Sweden) Alexander Oesterberg
Linesmen:
(Slovakia) Tomas Gegan
(Poland) Michal Gerne

	0–1	05:05 – L. Farkas (Nemes) (PP)
Cernik (Biber, Scherzer) (PP) – 09:22	1–1
Cernik (Scherzer) – 31:51	2–1
	2–2	38:17 – Dobos (B. Horváth, D. Horváth) (PP)
Biber (Dobnig) – 59:11	3–2

8 min
Penalties
8 min
31
Shots
24

13 December 2023; 12:30	Kazakhstan	4–0 (1–0, 1–0, 2–0)	France	Tüskecsarnok, Budapest; Attendance: 112

Game reference

Vladimir Nikitin
Goalies
Antoine Keller
Referees:
(Austria) Christian Ofner
(Hungary) Zsombor Palkovi
Linesmen:
(Slovakia) Tomas Gegan
(Poland) Michal Gerne

Nurkenov (Breus, Beisembayev) (SH) – 08:48	1–0
Smoliyanov (Yermak, Logvin) (PP) – 31:19	2–0
Nurkenov (Kim, Orazov) (PP) – 52:10	3–0
Simonov (Lyapunov, Smoliyaninov) – 53:59	4–0

8 min
Penalties
12 min
40
Shots
33

13 December 2023; 16:00	Japan	5–4 OT (3–2, 0–1, 1–1) (OT: 1–0)	Hungary	Tüskecsarnok, Budapest; Attendance: 548

Game reference

Issa Tamura
Goalies
Patrik Csala
Levente Hegedüs
Referees:
(Poland) Mihai Baca
(Slovakia) Martin Jobbagy
Linesmen:
(Canada) Brian Birkhoff
(Denmark) Emil Dalsgaard

F. Suzuki – 00:30	1–0
Sasanuma (Tanaka) – 02:20	2–0
	2–1	13:58 – Nemes (Franyó, L. Farkas,)
	2–2	42:24 – O. Farkas (Nemes, Szabó Rácz)
Kokuwa (Maxner, Fukuda) – 19:24	3–2
	3–3	29:33 – Szabó Rácz (L. Farkas, Nemes) (PP)
	3–4	42:24 – Ravasz (EQ)
Takada (Ushio) (EA) – 59:41	4–4
Kokuwa (Ushio, Takahashi) – 60:16	5–4

8 min
Penalties
8 min
36
Shots
27

13 December 2023; 19:30	Austria	3–4 (1–1, 0–1, 2–2)	Denmark	Tüskecsarnok, Budapest; Attendance: 114

Game reference

Benedikt Oschgan
Martin Reder
Goalies
Kristers Steinbergs
Referees:
(Germany) Achim Moosberger
(Sweden) Alexander Oesterberg
Linesmen:
(Hungary) Barna Kis-Kiraly
(Hungary) David Szabo

	0–1	09:28 – Olsson
Scherzer (Auer) – 10:05	1–1
	1–2	38:46 – Schioldan (Linde, Mølgaard) (PP)
	1–3	43:39 – Marloth (Linde, Olsson)
	1–4	45:02 – Thomsen (Mølgaard, Schioldan)
Lanzinger (Söllinger) – 48:46	2–4
Scherzer (Cernik) (EA) – 56:17	3–4

6 min
Penalties
4 min
32
Shots
26

14 December 2023; 12:30	Kazakhstan	3–1 (1–1, 1–0, 1–0)	Japan	Tüskecsarnok, Budapest; Attendance: 92

Game reference

Vladimir Nikitin
Goalies
Sazuku Kudo
Referees:
(Germany) Achim Mooseburger
(Norway) Christian Persson
Linesmen:
(Canada) Brian Birkhoff
(Hungary) David Szabo

	0–1	06:23 – Sasaki (F. Suzuki, Koiwa)
Smoliyaninov (Lyapunov, Khan) – 18:30	1–1
Lyapunov (Orazov) (PP) – 38:21	2–1
Ospanov (Breus) – 53:17	3–1

8 min
Penalties
14 min
45
Shots
26

14 December 2023; 16:00	France	7–4 (2–1, 3–1, 2–2)	Austria	Tüskecsarnok, Budapest; Attendance: 134

Game reference

Antoine Keller
Goalies
Benedikt Oschgan
Martin Reder
Referees:
(Poland) Michal Baca
(Slovakia) Martin Jobbagy
Linesmen:
(Denmark) Emil Dalsgaard
(Hungary) Barna Kis-Kiraly

Nogaretto (Cal, Raveaud) – 08:03	1–0
Grossetete (Tavernier, Eyre) (PP) – 11:39	2–0
	2–1	19:45 – Erne
Addamo (Chapuis) (PP) – 22:40	3–1
Tavernier (Perrenoud, Eyre) (PP) – 23:44	4–1
	4–2	27:23 – Wurzer (Kirchebner, Klassek)
Besnier (Tavernier, Villard) – 35:33	5–2
	5–3	43:39 – Neumann (Wurzer)
	5–4	52:00 – Dobnig (Klassek)
Chauvel (Chapuis, Besnier) (SH) – 54:17	6–4
Grossetete (ENG) – 59:21	7–4

8 min
Penalties
8 min
28
Shots
39

14 December 2023; 19:30	Hungary	1–3 (0–2, 1–0, 0–1)	Denmark	Tüskecsarnok, Budapest; Attendance: 938

Game reference

Patrik Csala
Goalies
Kristers Steinbergs
Referees:
(Sweden) Alexander Oesterberg
(Austria) Christian Ofner
Linesmen:
(Switzerland) Dominik Altmann
(Slovenia) Tadej Snoj

	0–1	05:02 – Linde (Schioldan)
	0–2	09:47 – Mondrup (Olsson, T. Petersen) (PP)
B. Horváth (Dobos, Mihalik) – 24:08	1–2
	1–3	48:06 – Olsson (Linde)

4 min
Penalties
4 min
22
Shots
24

16 December 2023; 12:30	Denmark	5–1 (2–1, 1–0, 2–0)	Japan	Tüskecsarnok, Budapest; Attendance: 98

Game reference

Tobias Vilykke
Goalies
Sazuku Kudo
Referees:
(Poland) Michal Baca
(Germany) Achim Moosberger
Linesmen:
(Switzerland) Dominik Altmann
(Slovenia) Tadej Snoj

Mondrup (T. Petersen) – 03:48	1–0
Schioldan (Thomsen, Als) – 05:37	2–0
	2–1	16:43 – Takeda (Sasanuma)
Lundmark (Klyvoe) – 39:19	3–1
Olsson (Marloth) – 44:59	4–1
Schioldan (Thomsen, Skovning) – 48:02	5–1

6 min
Penalties
8 min
34
Shots
29

16 December 2023; 16:00	France	0–4 (0–1, 0–2, 0–1)	Hungary	Tüskecsarnok, Budapest; Attendance: 1474

Game reference

Mathis Thirion
Goalies
Patrik Csala
Referees:
(Slovakia) Martin Jobbagy
(Sweden) Alexandeer Oesterberg
Linesmen:
(Canada) Brian Birkhoff
(Slovakia) Tomas Gegan

0–1	03:23 – Laskawy
0–2	21:47 – Simon (Csiki)
0–3	22:21 – Hiezl (Ravasz)
0–4	44:49 – B. Horváth (Nemes, Bajko)

4 min
Penalties
2 min
35
Shots
29

16 December 2023; 19:30	Austria	7–6 GWS (3–2, 1–4, 2–0) (OT: 0–0) (SO: 2–1)	Kazakhstan	Tüskecsarnok, Budapest; Attendance: 214

Game reference

Benedikt Oschgan
Goalies
Vladimir Nikitin
Artyom Shestakov
Referees:
(Hungary) Zsombor Palkovi
(Norway) Christian Persson
Linesmen:
(Denmark) Emil Dalsgaard
(Hungary) Barna Kis-Kiraly

Erne – 01:16	1–0
	1–1	04:37 – Kim
Lippitsch (Moosbrugger, Frimmel) (SH) – 10:04	2–1
	2–2	13:54 – Simonov (Smoliyaninov (PP)
Erne (Wurzer) – 18:09	3–2
Klassek (Wurzer) – 21:50	4–2
	4–3	24:17 – Kim (Nurkenov)
	4–4	29:05 – Ospanov (Brues) (PP)
	4–5	37:09 – Beisembayev
	4–6	39:24 – Yermak (Ospanov, Logvin)
Lanzinger (Erne, Reiner) – 46:11	5–6
Neumann (EA) – 58:43	6–6

Lippitsch (miss)
Erne
Neumann (miss)
Lanzinger (miss)
Cernik
Shootout
(miss) Smoliyaninov
Kim
(miss) Yermak
(miss) Logvin
(miss) Ospanov
14 min
Penalties
6 min
23
Shots
51

=== Statistics ===
==== Top 10 scorers ====
Pos	Player	Country	GP	G	A	Pts	+/–	PIM
1	Albert Schioldan	Denmark	5	4	4	8	+2	0
2	Emil Tavernier	France	5	3	4	7	–1	2
3	Valentin Grossetete	France	5	5	1	6	+2	2
4	Davlat Nurkenov	Kazakhstan	5	2	4	6	0	0
4	Philéas Perrenoud	France	5	2	4	6	+3	6
6	Hjalte Thomsen	Denmark	5	1	5	6	+1	2
7	Luca Erne	Austria	5	4	1	5	+4	0
8	Ian Scherzer	Austria	4	3	2	5	+2	2
9	Serino Maxner	Japan	5	3	2	5	+1	0
9	Daniel Olsson	Denmark	5	3	2	5	+6	4
9	Ruslan Osipov	Kazakhstan	5	3	2	5	+1	4
9	Egor Smoliyaninov	Kazakhstan	5	3	2	5	+3	2

GP = Games played; G = Goals; A = Assists; Pts = Points; +/− = P Plus–minus; PIM = Penalties In Minutes
Source: IIHF

==== Goaltending leaders ====
(minimum 40% team's total ice time)

Pos	Player	Country	TOI	GA	Sv%	GAA	SO
1	Vladimir Nikitin	Kazakhstan	283:10	7	94.44	146	1
2	Patrik Csala	Hungary	177:06	6	93.55	2.03	1
3	Sasuku Kudo	Japan	140:00	8	90.59	3.43	0
4	Kristers Steinbergs	Denmark	237:48	12	89.74	3.03	0
5	Antoine Keller	France	240:00	15	89.29	3.75	0

TOI = Time on ice (minutes:seconds); GA = Goals against; GAA = Goals against average; Sv% = Save percentage; SO = Shutouts
Source: IIHF

==== Best Players Selected by the Directorate ====
- Goaltender: (Kazakhstan) Vladimir Nikitin
- Defenceman: (France) Jamie Eyre
- Forward: (France) Emil Tavernier

Source: IIHF

== Division I B ==
2024 IIHF U20 World Championship Division I B

Tournament details
- Host country: Slovenia
- City: Bled
- Venue: 1 (in 1 host city)
- Dates: 11–17 December 2023
- Teams: 6

Tournament statistics
- Games played: 15
- Goals scored: 108 (7.2 per game)
- Attendance: 2,162 (144 per game)
- Scoring leader: (Ukraine) Mykyta Sydorenko (12 points)

Official website
- www.iihf.com

The Division I B tournament was played in Bled, Slovenia, from 11 to 17 December 2023.

=== Participants ===
Team	Qualification
Slovenia	placed 6th in Division I A last year and were relegated
Ukraine	placed 2nd in Division I B last year
Italy	placed 3rd in Division I B last year
Poland	placed 4th in Division I B last year
Estonia	placed 5th in Division I B last year
Croatia	placed 1st in Division II A last year and were promoted

=== Standings ===
Pos	Team	Pld	W	OTW	OTL	L	GF	GA	GD	Pts	Promotion or relegation
1	Slovenia (H)	5	5	0	0	0	25	6	+19	15	Promoted to the 2025 Division I A
2	Ukraine	5	3	1	0	1	23	13	+10	11	
3	Italy	5	2	0	1	2	24	17	+7	7	
4	Estonia	5	2	0	0	3	15	18	−3	6	
5	Poland	5	1	0	1	3	9	19	−10	4	
6	Croatia	5	0	1	0	4	12	35	−23	2	Relegated to the 2025 Division II A

Source: IIHF
Rules for classification: 1) points; 2) head-to-head points; 3) head-to-head goal difference; 4) head-to-head number of goals scored; 5) result against closest best-ranked team outside tied teams; 6) result against second-best-ranked team outside tied teams; 7) seeding before tournament.
(H) Host

=== Results ===
All times are local (UTC+2).

11 December 2023; 12:30	Estonia	1–5 (0–2, 1–2, 0–1)	Italy	Bled Ice Arena, Bled; Attendance: 44

Game reference

Fjodor Aganezovs
Goalies
Edoardo Berti
Referees:
(Hungary) Gergely Korbuly
(Denmark) Niclas Lundsgaard
Linesmen:
(United States) Matthew Heinen
(Slovakia) Matus Stanzel

	0–1	09:35 – Madaschi (Larcher, Purdeller)
	0–2	15:47 – Lobis (De Luca, Remolato) (PP)
M. Potšinok (E. Potšinok), Velja) (PP) – 24:15	1–2
	1–3	31:33 – Lobis (Larcher, Remolato) (PP)
	1–4	35:20 – De Luca (Remolato) (PP)
	1–5	46:20 – Purdeller (Albis, Gschleisser) (PP2)

14 min
Penalties
12 min
19
Shots
48

11 December 2023; 16:00	Poland	1–5 (0–1, 0–1, 1–3)	Ukraine	Bled Ice Arena, Bled; Attendance: 52

Game reference

Igor Tyczyński
Goalies
Gleb Artsatbanov
Referees:
(Czech Republic) Ludek Pilny
(Finland) Janne Wijorenheimo
Linesmen:
(Slovenia) Filip Jeram
(Norway) Herman Johansen

	0–1	03:16 – Dakhnovsky (Sydorenko, Kryklia)
	0–2	30:55 – Shapovalov (Yevtiekhov, Ivashchenko)
	0–3	41:44 – Troshkin (Shapovalov, Ivashchenko)
	0–4	46:03 – Yevtiekhov (Lysak, Troshkin)
	0–5	57:11 – Sydorenko (Volkov, Kosarev)
Siekierka (Rocki, Musioł) – 57:34	1–5

12 min
Penalties
27 min
27
Shots
31

11 December 2023; 19:30	Croatia	0–7 (0–1, 0–4, 0–2)	Slovenia	Bled Ice Arena, Bled; Attendance: 241

Game reference

Teo Janjatović-Lončar
Goalies
Lan Kavčič
Referees:
(Canada) Tanner Doiron
(Belgium) Chris Grinsven
Linesmen:
(Switzerland) Nathy Buergy
(Germany) Joshua Roemer

0–1	05:12 – Crnkič (Podrekar, Sitar) (PP)
0–2	20:20 – Langus (Sitar, Šlibar)
0–3	29:06 – Žeželj (Beričič, Crnkič)
0–4	30:08 – Langus (Sever, Crnkič) (PP)
0–5	31:53 – Hebar (Langus, Perčič) (SH)
0–6	47:45 – Sever (Šlibar, Perčič)
0–7	51:56 – Hebar (Perčič, Beričič)

8 min
Penalties
4 min
19
Shots
50

12 December 2023; 12:30	Ukraine	5–1 (0–1, 1–0, 4–0)	Estonia	Bled Ice Arena, Bled; Attendance: 26

Game reference

Gleb Artsatbanov
Goalies
Fjodor Aganezovs
Referees:
(Austria) Patrick Fichtner
(Denmark) Niclas Lundsgaard
Linesmen:
(Switzerland) Nathy Buergy
(Slovenia) Petja Murnik

	0–1	13:12 – Morozov (Timofejev, Kontseus) (PP)
Dubsky (Yatsishin, Lysak) – 26:16	1–1
Sydorenko (Dakhnovsky, Troshkin) – 46:52	2–1
Kryklia (Sydorenko, Kovalchuk) – 48:29	3–1
Dakhnovsky (Stetsiura, Kryklia) (PP) – 54:58	4–1
Kovalchuk (Yatsishin, Dubsky) (ENG) – 58:48	5–1

6 min
Penalties
6 min
33
Shots
19

12 December 2023; 16:00	Italy	11–2 (3–0, 6–2, 2–0)	Croatia	Bled Ice Arena, Bled; Attendance: 54

Game reference

Matthias Rindone
Goalies
Teo Janjatović-Lončar
Omar Zdralović
Referees:
(Canada) Tanner Doiron
(Czech Republic) Ludek Pilny
Linesmen:
(Slovenia) Filip Jeram
(Germany) Joshua Roemer

Zandegiacomo (Larcher, Lobis) – 09:47	1–0
Garau (Madaschi, Purdeller) (PP) – 11:28	2–0
Segafredo (Lobis, De Luca) – 15:46	3–0
Segafredo (Lobis, De Luca) – 23:15	4–0
	4–1	23:48 – Šimunković
	4–2	27:08 – Alić (H. Zovko)
Covelli (Girardi, Zandegiacomo) – 28:11	5–2
Zandegiacomo (Lobis, Albis) – 30:06	6–2
Segafredo (De Luca, Lobis) – 30:36	7–2
Remolato (De Luca,, Larcher) (PP) – 33:13	8–2
Garau (Purdeller, Gschliesser) – 39:27	9–2
Albis (Tolomelli, Purdeller) – 40:53	10–2
Remolato (Madaschi, Gschliesser) – 45:42	11–2

4 min
Penalties
8 min
36
Shots
26

12 December 2023; 19:30	Slovenia	3–0 (1–0, 2–0, 0–0)	Poland	Bled Ice Arena, Bled; Attendance: 237

Game reference

Lan Kavčič
Goalies
Jakub Ciućka
Referees:
(Hungary) Gergely Korbuly
(Finland) Janne Wijorenheimo
Linesmen:
(United States) Matthew Heinen
(Slovakia) Matus Stanzel

Lesničar (Mahmutovic, Hebar) – 19:11	1–0
Langus (Sitar, Podrekar) (PP) – 31:45	2–0
Žeželj (Bohinc, Mahmutovic) (PP) – 36:28	3–0

8 min
Penalties
12 min
35
Shots
16

14 December 2023; 12:30	Croatia	5–4 GWS (0–0, 1–2, 3–2) (OT: 0–0) (SO: 2–1)	Poland	Bled Ice Arena, Bled; Attendance: 54

Game reference

Teo Janjatović-Lončar
Goalies
Jakub Ciućka
Referees:
(Hungary) Gergley Korbuly
(Belgium) Chris van Grinsven
Linesmen:
(United States) Matthew Heinen
(Slovenia) Filip Jeram

Kašparek (Završki, Jurić) – 22:21	1–0
	1–1	23:20 – Kurnicki (Kucharski, Kusak)
	1–2	34:07 – Kucharski (Jo. Hofman, Sobecki) (PP)
	1–3	44:45 – Sierkierka (Schafer, Jo. Hofman)
Goršić (Bezuk, Šimunković) – 49:37	2–3
	2–4	56:35 – Kucharski (Ja. Hofman, Jo. Hofman) (PP)
Goršić (Bodiroga, Idžan) (EA) – 58:30	3–4
Idžan (Alić) (EA) – 59:15	4–4

Marinković (miss)
Goršić (miss)
Idžan
Bodiroga
Shootout
(miss) Kusak
Ciepielewski
(miss) Kucharski
(miss) Jo. Hofman
(miss) Ja. Hofman
10 min
Penalties
4 min
26
Shots
30

14 December 2023; 16:00	Slovenia	5–2 (2–0, 2–1, 1–1)	Estonia	Bled Ice Arena, Bled; Attendance: 127

Game reference

Lan Kavčič
Goalies
Cristopher Rembetti
Referees:
(Austria) Patrick Fichtner
(Czech Republic) Ludek Pilny
Linesmen:
(Switzerland) Nathy Buergy
(Germany) Joshua Roemer

Kumanovič (Lesničar, Hebar) – 03:17	1–0
Žeželj (Crnkič, Perčič) – 07:15	2–0
Sitar (Podrekar, Crnkič) (PP) – 32:08	3–0
Lesničar (Žeželj, Bohinc) (PP) – 36:42	4–0
	4–1	36:42 – M. Potšinok (E. Potšinok)
	4–2	57:40 – Proskurin (M. Potšinok, Kontseus)
Beričič (Langus, Sitar) (ENG) – 59:25	5–2

27 min
Penalties
8 min
43
Shots
17

14 December 2023; 19:30	Ukraine	5–4 OT (1–1, 1–3, 2–0) (OT: 1–0)	Italy	Bled Ice Arena, Bled; Attendance: 67

Game reference

Gleb Artsatbanov
Goalies
Edoardo Berti
Referees:
(Canada) Tanner Doiron
(Finland) Janne Wuorenheimo
Linesmen:
(Norway) Heman Johansen
(Slovenia) Petja Murnik

	0–1	05:33 – Segafredo (De Luca, Lobis) (PP)
Kryklia (Pazi, Simchuk) – 13:15	1–1
	1–2	20:42 – Lobis (Larcher, De Luca) (PP)
	1–3	23:45 – Madaschi (Lobis)
	1–4	25:15 – Prast (Egger)
Sydorenko (Stetsiura) – 31:30	2–4
Sydorenko (PS) – 49:35	3–4
Stetsiura (Kryklia) (SH) – 55:45	4–4
Sydorenko – 61:48	5–4

18 min
Penalties
8 min
36
Shots
22

15 December 2023; 12:30	Poland	0–3 (0–1, 0–0, 0–2)	Estonia	Bled Ice Arena, Bled; Attendance: 37

Game reference

Igor Tyczyński
Goalies
Fjodor Aganezovs
Referees:
(Canada) Tanner Doiron
(Belgium) Chris van Grinsven
Linesmen:
(Slovenia) Filip Jeram
(Slovenia) Petja Murnik

0–1	01:15 – Stepanov (Timofejev)
0–2	47:39 – Stepanov
0–3	58:48 – Stepanov (Timofejev, Nevolainen) (ENG)

2 min
Penalties
6 min
32
Shots
35

15 December 2023; 16:00	Ukraine	5–2 (1–0, 0–2, 4–0)	Croatia	Bled Ice Arena, Bled; Attendance: 72

Game reference

Gleb Artsatbanov
Goalies
Omar Ždralović
Referees:
(Austria) Patrick Fichtner
(Hungary) Gergely Korbuly
Linesmen:
(United States) Matthew Heinen
(Norway) Herman Johansen

Polonytsky (Yevtiekhov, Shapovalov) – 06:34	1–0
	1–1	24:42 – Marinković (Bezuk, Goršić)
	1–2	37:10 – Jurić (Završki)
Sydorenko (PS) – 46:28	2–2
Shapovalov – 48:37	3–2
Sydorenko (Kryklia, Stetsiura) – 49:12	4–2
Dakhnovsky (Sydorenko, Simchuk) (PP) – 53:09	5–2

2 min
Penalties
6 min
49
Shots
25

15 December 2023; 19:30	Italy	1–5 (0–2, 1–1, 0–2)	Slovenia	Bled Ice Arena, Bled; Attendance: 473

Game reference

Edoardo Berti
Goalies
Lan Kavčič
Referees:
(Denmark) Niclas Lundsgaard
(Czech Republic) Ludek Pilny
Linesmen:
(Switzerland) Nathy Buergy
(Slovakia) Matus Stanzel

	0–1	01:25 – Kumanovič (Mahmutovic)
	0–2	14:59 – Sitar (Sever)
Segafredo (De Luca) – 21:16	1–2
	1–3	33:34 – Žeželj (Crnkič, Beričič)
	1–4	40:13 – Sitar (Langus)
	1–5	50:02 – Sever (Crnkič) (PP)

8 min
Penalties
10 min
14
Shots
36

17 December 2023; 12:30	Estonia	8–3 (4–0, 2–3, 2–0)	Croatia	Bled Ice Arena, Bled; Attendance: 37

Game reference

Fjodor Aganezovs
Goalies
Omar Ždralović
Teo Janjatović-Lončar
Referees:
(Denmark) Niclas Lundsgaard
(Czech Republic) Ludek Pilny
Linesmen:
(Norway) Herman Johansen
(Germany) Joshua Roemer

E. Potšinok (Morozov, Kudeviita) – 02:17	1–0
Potšinok (E. Potšinok, Kontseus) – 04:47	2–0
Kontseus (Timofejev, M. Potšinok) (PP) – 16:45	3–0
M. Potšinok (E. Potšinok, Kontseus) (PP) – 19:34	4–0
Timofejev (Stepanov, Nevolainen) – 20:45	5–0
	5–1	24:34 – Idžan (Marinković, Goršić) (PP)
	5–2	27:42 – Bezuk (Idžan, Marinković)
M. Potšinok (E. Potšinok) – 28:32	6–2
	6–3	34:51 – Kasparek
E. Potšinok (M. Potšinok) – 40:35	7–3
Kontseus – 45:35	8–3

10 min
Penalties
12 min
29
Shots
32

17 December 2023; 16:00	Italy	3–4 (1–2, 2–0, 0–2)	Poland	Bled Ice Arena, Bled; Attendance: 54

Game reference

Matthias Rindone
Goalies
Igor Tyczyński
Referees:
(Austria) Patrick Fichtner
(Belgium) Chris van Grinsven
Linesmen:
(Slovenia) Filip Jeram
(Slovenia) Petja Murnik

	0–1	15:55 – Ciepielewski (Schafer, Kurnicki) (PP)
	0–2	18:19 – Ciepielewski (Kusak)
Madaschi (Tolomelli, Purdeller) (PP) – 19:58	1–2
Lobis (De Luca) – 33:02	2–2
Remolato (Larcher, Egger) – 39:53	3–2
	3–3	47:55 – Gromadzki (Siekierka, Rocki)
	3–4	48:15 – Kusak (PS)

8 min
Penalties
4 min
20
Shots
23

17 December 2023; 19:30	Slovenia	5–3 (1–0, 2–3, 2–0)	Ukraine	Bled Ice Arena, Bled; Attendance: 587

Game reference

Lan Kavčič
Goalies
Gleb Artsatbanov
Referees:
(Canada) Tanner Doiron
(Finland) Janne Wijorenheimo
Linesmen:
(United States) Matthew Heinen
(Slovakia) Matus Stanzel

Sitar – 12:17	1–0
Crnkič (Žeželj, Beričič) – 20:37	2–0
	2–1	22:10 – Shamardin (Kryklia, Sydorenko)
	2–2	34:15 – Sydorenko
	2–3	38:24 – Simchuk (Pazi, Dakhnovsky)
Sever (Sitar) – 39:15	3–3
Sitar – 41:48	4–3
Špari Leben (Črepinšek) – 44:33	5–3

22 min
Penalties
55 min
24
Shots
28

=== Statistics ===
==== Top 10 scorers ====
Pos	Player	Country	GP	G	A	Pts	+/–	PIM
1	Mykyta Sydorenko	Ukraine	5	8	4	12	+3	14
2	Alan Lobis	Italy	5	4	7	11	+7	0
3	Filip Sitar	Slovenia	5	5	5	10	+8	0
4	Tommaso de Luca	Italy	5	1	9	10	+4	6
5	Maj Crnkič	Slovenia	5	2	7	9	+5	2
6	Marek Potšinok	Estonia	5	5	3	8	0	6
7	Nace Langus	Slovenia	5	3	5	8	+6	0
8	Illia Kryklia	Ukraine	5	2	6	8	+7	4
9	Anže Žeželj	Slovenia	5	4	2	6	+4	0
10	Nicolo Remolato	Italy	5	3	3	6	–3	0
10	Mark Sever	Slovenia	5	3	3	6	+5	0

GP = Games played; G = Goals; A = Assists; Pts = Points; +/− = P Plus–minus; PIM = Penalties In Minutes
Source: IIHF

==== Goaltending leaders ====
(minimum 40% team's total ice time)

Pos	Player	Country	TOI	GA	Sv%	GAA	SO
1	Lan Kavčič	Slovenia	300:00	6	93.62	1.20	2
2	Fjodor Aganezovs	Estonia	236:13	12	91.67	3.05	1
3	Jakub Ciucka	Poland	125:00	7	88.33	3.36	0
4	Igor Tyczyński	Poland	179:42	10	88.24	3.34	0
5	Edoardo Berti	Italy	181:48	11	87.91	3.63	0

TOI = Time on ice (minutes:seconds); GA = Goals against; GAA = Goals against average; Sv% = Save percentage; SO = Shutouts
Source: IIHF

==== Best Players Selected by the Directorate ====
- Goaltender: (Slovenia) Lan Kavčič
- Defenceman: (Slovenia) Tian Hebar
- Forward: (Ukraine) Mykyta Sydorenko

Source: IIHF
