= Ukraine men's national junior ice hockey team =

Ukraine
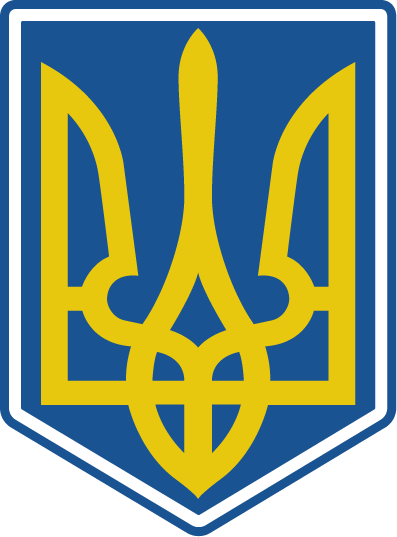
- Association: Ice Hockey Federation of Ukraine
- Head coach: (Ukraine) Alexander Godynyuk
- Assistants: (Ukraine) Mykola Maiko
- Captain: Vsevolod Tolstushko
- Most points: Vitaly Semenchenko (25)
- IIHF code: UKR

First international
- Ukraine 20 – 0 Lithuania (Minsk, Belarus; 10 November 1992)

Biggest win
- Ukraine 20 – 0 Lithuania (Minsk, Belarus; 10 November 1992)

Biggest defeat
- Finland 14 – 1 Ukraine (Helsinki, Finland; 30 December 2003)

IIHF World U20 Championship
- Appearances: 32 (first in 1993)
- Best result: 8th (1995)

International record (W–L–T)
- 57–58–8

The Ukrainian men's national junior ice hockey team is the national under-20 ice hockey team in Ukraine. The team represents Ukraine at the International Ice Hockey Federation's World Junior Hockey Championship Division I.

== History ==
Ukraine made its first appearance at the top level in 1994, less than five years after gaining independence from the Soviet Union. Ukraine went on to upset the United States, and Ukrainian goaltender Igor Karpenko went on to win top goaltender at the 1995 World Junior Ice Hockey Championships.

== International competitions ==
=== World Junior Championships ===
- 1993 – 17th overall (1st in Pool C)
- 1994 – 9th overall (1st in Pool B)
- 1995 – 8th overall
- 1996 – 10th overall
- 1997 – 15th overall (5th in Pool B)
- 1998 – 12th overall (2nd in Pool B)
- 1999 – 11th overall (1st in Pool B)
- 2000 – 10th overall
- 2001 – 13th overall (3rd in Division I)
- 2002 – 14th overall (4th in Division I)
- 2003 – 11th overall (1st in Division I, Group A)
- 2004 – 10th overall
- 2005 – 19th overall (5th in Division I, Group B)
- 2006 – 19th overall (5th in Division I, Group A)
- 2007 – 15th overall (3rd in Division I, Group A)
- 2008 – 20th overall (5th in Division I, Group A)
- 2009 – 19th overall (5th in Division I, Group B)
- 2010 – 18th overall (4th in Division I, Group A)
- 2011 – 22nd overall (6th in Division I, Group A)
- 2012 – 23rd overall (1st in Division IIA)
- 2013 – 20th overall (4th in Division IB)
- 2014 – 20th overall (4th in Division IB)
- 2015 – 18th overall (2nd in Division IB)
- 2016 – 20th overall (4th in Division IB)
- 2017 – 21st overall (5th in Division IB)
- 2018 – 20th overall (4th in Division IB)
- 2019 – 21st overall (5th in Division IB)
- 2020 – 19th overall (3rd in Division IB)
- 2021 – Cancelled
- 2022 – 20th overall (4th in Division IB)
- 2023 – 18th overall (2nd in Division IB)
- 2024 – 18th overall (2nd in Division IB)
- 2025 – 17th overall (1st in Division IB)
- 2026 – 15th overall (5th in Division IA)
