= Antoine Keller =

French ice hockey player (born 2004)

- Born: 6 October 2004 (age 21) Dijon, France
- Height: 191 cm (6 ft 3 in)
- Weight: 85 kg (187 lb; 13 st 5 lb)
- Position: Goaltender
- Catches: Left
- NL team Former teams: HC Ajoie; Lausanne HC
- National team: France
- NHL draft: 206th overall, 2023; Washington Capitals
- Playing career: 2024–present

Antoine Keller (born 6 October 2004) is a French professional ice hockey player who is a goaltender for HC Ajoie of the National League (NL).

== Playing career ==
On 16 October 2025, Keller was loaned to the South Carolina Stingrays.

== International play ==
Keller represented the France national team at the 2026 Winter Olympics and the 2025 IIHF World Championship.
