= Belarus men's national junior ice hockey team =

Belarus
- The coat of Arms of Belarus is the badge used on the players jerseys
- Association: Belarus Ice Hockey Federation
- Head coach: (Belarus) Pavel Perepekhin
- Assistants: (Belarus) Andrei Kudin (Belarus) Andrei Zalivako
- Captain: Artur Gavrus
- Most points: Andrei Kostitsyn (21)
- IIHF code: BLR

First international
- Kazakhstan 4 - 0 Belarus (Minsk, Belarus; November 10, 1992)

Biggest win
- Belarus 19 - 0 Lithuania (Minsk, Belarus; November 12, 1992)

Biggest defeat
- Russia 12 - 1 Belarus (Podolsk, Russia; December 27, 2000)

IIHF World U20 Championship
- Appearances: 28 (first in 1993)
- Best result: 9th (2001, 2002)

International record (W–L–T)
- 50–47–6

The Belarusian men's national under-20 ice hockey team is the national under-20 ice hockey team in Belarus. The team represented Belarus at the International Ice Hockey Federation's World Junior Hockey Championship. Prior to independence in 1991, Belarusian players played for the Soviet Union, which played in the World Juniors from its inception in 1974. Belarus has played in the top division eight times, first in 1999 and most recently in 2018, with their best finish being ninth overall in both 2001 and 2002.

Due to the 2022 Russian invasion of Ukraine, the International Ice Hockey Federation banned all Belarusian national and club teams from its events indefinitely, and Hockey Canada banned Belarus's “participation in events held in Canada that do not fall under the IIHF’s jurisdiction.”

== History ==
Belarus became an independent nation in 1991, and the team made their first appearance at the World Junior Hockey Championships in 1998, when Belarus won Pool B (now Division I). The U20 team played at the 1999 World Junior Ice Hockey Championships in Winnipeg, but the Belarusians never won a game. Belarus finished 10th and were relegated to Pool B for 2000. The team returned to the top level by defeating Germany in the final. The Belarusians avoided relegation by winning and tying a game against the Kazakhs.

Belarus competed in the 2002 and 2003 World Junior Championships, until finally being relegated under the new IIHF format. Belarus returned to the top division in 2005, but were relegated again. Belarus has mainly been in the second-tier Division I level since then, though have been promoted to the top division on occasion, most recently in 2018.

== World Junior Championship record ==
| Year | Rank |
|---|---|
| 1974–1992 | As part of Soviet Union |
| (Belarus) 1993 | 3rd in Minsk Group (Pool C) |
| (Slovakia) 1994 | 26th (Pool C) |
| (Spain) 1995 | 20th (Pool C1) |
| (Slovenia) 1996 | 22nd (Pool C) |
| (Romania) 1997 | 1st, Promoted to Pool B |
| (Poland) 1998 | 1st, Promoted to Top Division |
| (Canada) 1999 | 10th place (Relegated to Pool B) |
| (Belarus) 2000 | 1st, Promoted to Top Division |
| (Russia) 2001 | 9th place |
| (Czech Republic) 2002 | 9th place |
| (Canada) 2003 | 10th place (Relegated to Division I) |
| (France) 2004 | 1st, Promoted to Top Division |
| (United States) 2005 | 10th place (Relegated to Division I) |
| (Belarus) 2006 | 1st, Promoted to Top Division |
| (Sweden) 2007 | 13th place (Relegated to Division I) |
| (Latvia) 2008 | 13th place (Division I) |
| (Switzerland) 2009 | 13th place (Division I) |
| (Poland) 2010 | 14th place (Division I) |
| (Belarus) 2011 | 13th place (Division I) |
| (Germany) 2012 | 12th place (Division I) |
| (France) 2013 | 12th place (Division I) |
| (Poland) 2014 | 13th place (Division I) |
| (Italy) 2015 | 1st, Promoted to Top Division |
| (Finland) 2016 | 10th place (Relegated to Division I) |
| (Germany) 2017 | 1st, Promoted to Top Division |
| (United States) 2018 | 10th place (Relegated to Division I) |
| (Germany) 2019 | 12th place (Division I) |
| (Belarus) 2020 | 13th place (Division I) |
| (Denmark) 2021 | Cancelled due to the COVID-19 pandemic |
| (Denmark) 2022 | 1st, Promoted to Top Division (expelled) |
| (Canada) 2023 | Expelled |
| (Sweden) 2024 | Expelled |
