= 2026 World Junior Ice Hockey Championships – Division I =

International youth ice hockey tournament

2026 IIHF U20 World Championship Division I
Tournament details
- Host countries: Slovenia; Italy
- Venues: 2 (in 2 host cities)
- Dates: 7–13 December 2025; 8–14 December 2025
- Teams: 12

The 2026 World Junior Ice Hockey Championships Division I were two international under-20 ice hockey tournaments organized by the International Ice Hockey Federation. Division I A represents the second tier and Division I B the third tier of the IIHF World Junior Championship. For each tier, the first-placed team was promoted to the next higher tier, while the last-placed team was relegated to the next lower tier.

To be eligible as a junior player in these tournaments, a player couldn't be born earlier than 2006.

== Division I A ==
2026 IIHF U20 World Championship Division I A

Tournament details
- Host country: Slovenia
- City: Bled
- Venue: 1 (in 1 host city)
- Dates: 7–13 December 2025
- Teams: 6
- Promoted: Norway
- Relegated: France

Tournament statistics
- Games played: 15
- Goals scored: 134 (8.93 per game)
- Attendance: 2,810 (187 per game)
- Scoring leader: (Kazakhstan) Korney Korneyev (12 points)

Official website
- www.iihf.com

The Division I A tournament was played in Bled, Slovenia, from 7 to 13 December 2025.

=== Participating teams ===
Team	Qualification
Kazakhstan	placed 10th in Top Division last year and were relegated
Austria	placed 2nd in Division I A last year
Norway	placed 3rd in Division I A last year
Slovenia (hosts)	placed 4th in Division I A last year
France	placed 5th in Division I A last year
Ukraine	placed 1st in Division I B last year and were promoted

=== Final standings ===
Pos	Team	Pld	W	OTW	OTL	L	GF	GA	GD	Pts	Promotion or relegation
1	Norway	5	4	1	0	0	37	11	+26	14	Promoted to the 2027 Top Division
2	Kazakhstan	5	2	1	1	1	27	26	+1	9 (Note: Head-to-head points: Kazakhstan 3, Austria 0)	
3	Austria	5	3	0	0	2	25	18	+7	9	
4	Slovenia (H)	5	1	1	1	2	17	26	−9	6 (Note: Head-to-head points: Slovenia 3, Ukraine 0)	
5	Ukraine	5	1	1	1	2	12	19	−7	6	
6	France	5	0	0	1	4	16	34	−18	1	Relegated to the 2027 Division I B

Source: IIHF
Rules for classification: 1) points; 2) head-to-head points; 3) head-to-head goal difference; 4) head-to-head number of goals scored; 5) result against closest best-ranked team outside tied teams; 6) result against next best-ranked team outside tied teams; 7) seeding before tournament.
(H) Host

=== Match results ===
All times are local (CET; UTC+1).

7 December 2025; 12:30	France	2–8 (2–3, 0–4, 0–1)	Norway	Bled Ice Arena, Bled; Attendance: 112

Game reference

Baptiste Boudet
Maxim Lavoie
Goalies
Albert Englund
Referees:
(Hungary) Gergely Gebei
(United Kingdom) Joe Sewell
Linesmen:
(Czech Republic) Michal Axman
(Austria) Wolfgang Puff

	0–1	01:38 – Koblar (Sørensen, Vatne)
	0–2	02:32 – Myhre (Olsen Brekke, Kopperstad)
	0–3	08:54 – Kiønig (Myhre)
Terglav (Cal, Hostein) – 09:25	1–3
Djian (Nsonsa-Kitala, Guidoux) (PP) – 13:45	2–3
	2–4	21:53 – Eriksen (Aaram-Olsen)
	2–5	23:11 – Olsen Brekke (Vatne, Myhre) (PP)
	2–6	27:43 – Nilsgård (Olsen Brekke, Määttänen)
	2–7	32:24 – Aaram-Olsen (Solheim, Eriksen)
	2–8	40:32 – Olsen Brekke (Bakkevig)

8 min
Penalties
8 min
31
Shots
31

7 December 2025; 16:00	Slovenia	2–5 (1–3, 0–2, 1–0)	Austria	Bled Ice Arena, Bled; Attendance: 487

Game reference

Bor Glavič
Goalies
Luca Haitzmann
Referees:
(United States) Tyler Hascall
(Norway) Oskar Øvstedal
Linesmen:
(Norway) Christopher Dehn
(Germany) Kenneth Englisch

Petronijevič Lepša (Groznik, Bizjak) – 01:56	1–0
	1–1	08:23 – Oschgan (I. Zelenov, Gruber)
	1–2	13:55 – Neumann (Krainer, Konstantin Hutzinger) (PP)
	1–3	17:57 – V. Zelenov (Hutzinger, Schnabl)
	1–4	36:13 – Oberhauser (V. Zelenov, Biber)
	1–5	37:52 – Hutzinger (Biber, Neumann) (PP)
Plemelj (Zupančič, Petrovič) – 56:14	2–5

8 min
Penalties
4 min
17
Shots
31

7 December 2025; 19:30	Ukraine	2–1 OT (0–1, 0–0, 1–0) (OT: 1–0)	Kazakhstan	Bled Ice Arena, Bled; Attendance: 123

Game reference

Alexander Levshyn
Goalies
Dmitriy Ryashin
Referees:
(Denmark) Rasmus Ankersen
(France) Cyril Debuche
Linesmen:
(Latvia) Voldemārs Rava
(Canada) Brennan Walker

	0–1	06:52 – Korneyev (Kazhibekov, Imashev)
Kulikov (Kosarev, Shybinskyi) (PP) – 41:55	1–1
Kuraiev (Haponenko, Stasiuk) – 62:33	2–1

10 min
Penalties
10 min
47
Shots
30

8 December 2025; 12:30	Austria	4–2 (2–1, 2–0, 0–1)	France	Bled Ice Arena, Bled; Attendance: 187

Game reference

Patrick Grascher
Goalies
Baptiste Boudet
Referees:
(Hungary) Gergely Gebei
(Norway) Oskar Øvstedal
Linesmen:
(Norway) Christopher Dehn
(Finland) Niko Jusi

Hutzinger (V. Zelenov, Neumann) – 06:41	1–0
Hutzinger (Oberhauser, V. Zelenov) – 13:28	2–0
	2–1	18:50 – Monarque (Guidoux, Nsonsa-Kitala) (PP)
Oschgan (Sintschnig, I. Zelenov) – 21:57	3–1
Kolarik (Neumann) – 32:34	4–1
	4–2	49:22 – Le Lem (Pfirter, Djian)

6 min
Penalties
10 min
24
Shots
19

8 December 2025; 16:00	Norway	3–2 OT (0–1, 0–0, 2–1) (OT: 1–0)	Ukraine	Bled Ice Arena, Bled; Attendance: 135

Game reference

Markus Walberg
Goalies
Alexander Levshyn
Referees:
(France) Cyril Debuche
(United Kingdom) Joe Sewell
Linesmen:
(Germany) Kenneth Englisch
(Canada) Brennan Walker

	0–1	04:05 – Shybinskyi (Yalovyi, Yevtiekhov) (PP)
	0–2	46:52 – Kuraiev (Skorokhod, Haponenko) (PP)
Vatne (Kopperstad, Olsen Brekke) (PP) – 54:39	1–2
Myhre (Koblar, Vatne) (PP) – 55:57	2–2
Aaram-Olsen) PS – 62:07	3–2

8 min
Penalties
12 min
43
Shots
34

8 December 2025; 19:30	Kazakhstan	5–4 GWS (0–2, 1–1, 3–1) (OT: 0–0) (SO: 1–0)	Slovenia	Bled Ice Arena, Bled; Attendance: 222

Game reference

Daulet Kuat
Goalies
Gal Hebar
Referees:
(Latvia) Emīls Druseiks
(United States) Tyler Hascall
Linesmen:
(Czech Republic) Michal Axman
(Austria) Wolfgang Puff

	0–1	03:15 – Plemelj (Petrovič)
	0–2	08:18 – Petronijevič Lepša (Bizjak, Habjanič)
Alibek – 20:14	1–2
	1–3	33:21 – Leben (Petrovič, Plemelj)
As. Sarkenov (Alibek) (PP) – 45:53	2–3
	2–4	50:26 – Goličič (Petronijevič Lepša, Zupančič)
Alibek (Al. Sarkenov, Kazhibekov) – 52:03	3–4
Al. Sarkenov (Cherkassov, Alibek) – 53:27	4–4

Alibek
Al. Sarkenov
Bozhko (miss)
Cherkassov
Shootout
(miss) Plemelj
(miss) Petrovič
Petronijevič Lepša
(miss) Goličič
6 min
Penalties
8 min
43
Shots
35

10 December 2025; 12:30	Austria	3–7 (0–2, 1–1, 2–4)	Norway	Bled Ice Arena, Bled; Attendance: 156

Game reference

Luca Haitzmann
Goalies
Albert Englund
Referees:
(Hungary) Gergely Gebei
(United States) Tyler Hascall
Linesmen:
(Czech Republic) Michal Axman
(Canada) Brennan Walker

	0–1	09:56 – Myhre (Koblar, Olsen Brekke)
	0–2	14:13 – Vatne (Eriksen, Sørensen)
Hutzinger (V. Zelenov, Reiner) (PP) – 25:42	1–2
	1–3	32:14 – Aaram-Olsen (Lafton)
	1–4	48:26 – Finckenhagen (Aaram-Olsen, Eriksen)
	1–5	53:11 – Bakkevig
	1–6	56:26 – Aaram-Olsen (Eriksen, Lafton) (PP)
	1–7	57:01 – Bannerud (Morken, Lunde)
Reiner (Krainer, Hutzinger) (PP2) – 58:09	2–7
Neumann (Hutzinger) (PP) – 59:05	3–7

22 min
Penalties
20 min
39
Shots
23

10 December 2025; 16:00	Ukraine	3–4 (0–1, 2–1, 1–2)	Slovenia	Bled Ice Arena, Bled; Attendance: 206

Game reference

Alexander Levshyn
Goalies
Gal Hebar
Referees:
(Norway) Oskar Øvstedal
(United Kingdom) Joe Sewell
Linesmen:
(Germany) Kenneth Englisch
(Austria) Wolfgang Puff

	0–1	17:40 – Berc
Shybinskyi (Voroteliak) – 23:27	1–1
Kosarev (Haponenko, Shybinskyi) (PP2) – 31:48	2–1
	2–2	34:08 – Leben (Petrovič, Goličič) (PP)
Shybinskyi (Yevtiekhov, Yalovyi) (PP) – 41:04	3–2
	3–3	56:25 – Plemelj (Leben)
	3–4	58:03 – Bizjak (Mlakar)

8 min
Penalties
18 min
31
Shots
24

10 December 2025; 19:30	Kazakhstan	14–6 (1–2, 4–1, 9–3)	France	Bled Ice Arena, Bled; Attendance: 93

Game reference

Daulet Kuat
Dmitriy Ryashin
Goalies
Guillaume Schoch
Baptiste Boudet
Referees:
(Denmark) Rasmus Ankersen
(Latvia) Emīls Druseiks
Linesmen:
(Finland) Niko Jusi
(Latvia) Voldemars Rava

	0–1	5:57 – Fine (Cal, Hostein)
	0–2	7:27 – Riu (Nsonsa-Kitala, Monarque)
Bozhko (Alibek) – 16:44	1–2
Shipilin (Ziyash) – 24:28	2–2
Bozhko (Tussupbekov, As. Sarkenov) – 24:58	3–2
Simonov (Mindubayev, Shevchenko) – 35:53	4–2
	4–3	36:36 – Fine (Hostein, Jribi-Chauviere)
Korneyev (Bozhko) (PP) – 39:41	5–3
Cherkassov – 40:49	6–3
As. Sarkenov (Bozhko) (SH) – 44:22	7–3
	7–4	44:48 – Monarque (Dufour, Nsonsa-Kitala) (PP)
Alibek (Cherkassov, Al. Sarkenov) – 44:48	8–4
	8–5	46:03 – Cal (Dufour)
As. Sarkenov (Al. Sarkenov, Korneyev) (PP) – 47:14	9–5
Al. Sarkenov (Korneyev) – 51:03	10–5
As. Sarkenov – 51:12	11–5
	11–6	52:32 – Cal (Fine, Hostein)
Korneyev (Tussupbekov, Shevchenko) (PP) – 52:48	12–6
As. Sarkenov (Bozhko) – 55:09	13–6
Cherkassov (Alibek) (PP) – 57:27	14–6

16 min
Penalties
16 min
33
Shots
44

11 December 2025; 12:30	Austria	9–2 (4–2, 4–0, 1–0)	Ukraine	Bled Ice Arena, Bled; Attendance: 112

Game reference

Patrick Grascher
Goalies
Alexander Levshyn
Nazr Boiko
Referees:
(France) Cyril Debuche
(Latvia) Emīls Druseiks
Linesmen:
(Finland) Niko Jusi
(Latvia) Voldemars Rava

Gesson (Oberhauser, Bohs) – 02:08	1–0
Gesson (Waschnig, Schnabl) – 10:12	2–0
Kolarik (V. Zelenov, I. Zelenov) – 10:52	3–0
	3–1	13:36 – Kosarev (Haponenko) (PP)
	3–2	13:45 – Skorkhod (Voroteliak, Kulikov) (EA)
Waschnig (Schnabl, Neumann) – 15:55	4–2
Neumann (Hutzinger, Reiner) (PP) – 21:25	5–2
Hutzinger (V. Zelenov, Reiner) (PP) – 25:14	6–2
V. Zelenov (Neumann, Hutzinger) (PP) – 29:13	7–2
Kolarik (V. Zelenov, Bohs) – 36:06	8–2
Kolarik (Gesson, Oschgan) (PP) – 50:59	9–2

8 min
Penalties
35 min
31
Shots
21

11 December 2025; 16:00	Norway	10–2 (3–0, 4–1, 3–1)	Kazakhstan	Bled Ice Arena, Bled; Attendance: 124

Game reference

Albert Englund
Goalies
Dmitriy Ryashin
Daulet Kuat
Referees:
(Hungary) Gergely Gebei
(United Kingdom) Joe Sewell
Linesmen:
(Austria) Wolfgang Puff
(Canada) Brennan Walker

Koblar (Vatne, Lafton) – 00:52	1–0
Aaram Olsen (Eriksen, Finckenhagen) – 08:00 (PP)	2–0
Aaram Olsen (Eriksen, Lafton) (PP2) – 12:14	3–0
	3–1	22:31 – Korneyev (Mindubayev, As. Sarkenov) (EA)
Vatne (Koblar, Sørensen) – 24:48	4–1
Koblar (Kiønig, Sunde) – 24:56	5–1
Eriksen (Lafton, Finckenhagen) – 29:06	6–1
Baanerud (Lunde) – 36:30	7–1
Sørensen (Koblar, Vatne) – 43:16	8–1
Koblar (Myhre, Kopperstad) (PP) – 45:11	9–1
Finckenhagen (Lafton, Aaram Olsen) – 47:41	10–1
	10–2	51:52 – Imashev (As. Sarkenov, Korneyev)

45 min
Penalties
51 min
48
Shots
19

11 December 2025; 19:30	Slovenia	5–4 OT (1–2, 2–2, 1–0) (OT: 1–0)	France	Bled Ice Arena, Bled; Attendance: 235

Game reference

Gal Hebar
Bor Glavič
Goalies
Baptiste Boudet
Guillaume Schoch
Referees:
(Denmark) Rasmus Ankersen
(United States) Tyler Hascall
Linesmen:
(Norway) Christopher Dehn
(Germany) Kenneth Englisch

	0–1	06:01 – Dufour (Haag, Pfirter)
	0–2	13:03 – Dufour (Nsonsa-Kitala)
Leben (Petrovič, Goličič) (PP) – 14:56	1–2
	1–3	23:30 – Dufour (Guidoux, Djian) (PP)
	1–4	24:50 – Le Lam (Vidal)
Groznik (Gruškovnjak ) – 30:13	2–4
Spari Leben (Zalokar) – 33:35	3–4
Berc (Bizjak, Mlakar) (PP) – 43:31	4–4
Plemelj (Goličič, Petronijevič Lepša) – 63:14	5–4

8 min
Penalties
14 min
45
Shots
23

13 December 2025; 12:30	France	2–3 (2–0, 0–2, 0–1)	Ukraine	Bled Ice Arena, Bled; Attendance: 98

Game reference

Guillaume Schoch
Goalies
Nazar Boiko
Referees:
(Hungary) Gergely Gebei
(Norway) Oskar Øvstedal
Linesmen:
(Germany) Kenneth Englisch
(Finland) Niko Jusi

Le Lem (Djian, Pfirter) – 04:01	1–0
Dufour (Nsonsa-Kitala, Monarque) (PP) – 04:35	2–0
	2–1	22:06 – Kosarev (Shulha, Yevtiekhov)
	2–2	34:08 – Yevtiekhov (Yalovyi, Shybinskyi) (PP)
	2–3	59:39 – Denysenko (Shybinskyi, Voroteliak) (ENG)

8 min
Penalties
12 min
34
Shots
36

13 December 2025; 16:00	Kazakhstan	5–4 (2–4, 0–0, 3–0)	Austria	Bled Ice Arena, Bled; Attendance: 195

Game reference

Dmitriy Ryashin
Goalies
Patrick Grascher
Referees:
(Denmark) Rasmus Ankersen
(United Kingdom) Joe Sewell
Linesmen:
(Norway) Christopher Dehn
(Canada) Brennan Walker

	0–1	03:41 – Waschnig (Hutzinger, Neumann)
	0–2	07:13 – Kolarik (Schnabl, Oschgan) (PP)
	0–3	08:05 – Schnabl (Kolarik, Gesson) (PP)
	0–4	15:22 – Oschgan (Gesson, Schnabl) (PP)
Al. Sarkenov (Cherkassov, Korneyev) – 17:40	1–4
Korneyev (Al. Sarkenov) – 19:40	2–4
Cherkassov (Korneyev, Al. Sarkenov) (PP) – 41:13	3–4
Shipilin (Korneyev, Al. Sarkenov) (PP) – 44:45	4–4
Korneyev (Al. Sarkenov) (EN) – 58:29	5–4

16 min
Penalties
6 min
18
Shots
39

13 December 2025; 19:30	Norway	9–2 (5–0, 2–1, 2–1)	Slovenia	Bled Ice Arena, Bled; Attendance: 325

Game reference

Albert Englund
Markus Walberg
Goalies
Jon Kavčič
Gal Hebar
Referees:
(France) Cyril Debuche
(Latvia) Emīls Druseiks
Linesmen:
(Czech Republic) Michal Axman
(Latvia) Voldemars Rava

Myhre – 03:27	1–0
Sørensen (Koblar, Vatne) – 03:55	2–0
Kevvig (Myhre) – 09:09	3–0
Lafton (Myhre, Olsen Brekke) – 13:26	4–0
Lunde (Vatne, Lafton) – 14:48	5–0
Sørensen (Finckenhagen, Eriksen) (PP) – 24:26	6–0
Koblar (Kopperstad) – 27:34	7–0
	7–1	32:40 – Petronijevič Lepša (Habjanič, Zupančič)
	7–2	43:05 – Leben (Sturm)
Eriksen (Lafton, Aaram Olsen) (PP) – 51:26	8–2
Myhre (Olsen Brekke, Määttänen) – 52:43	9–2

8 min
Penalties
39 min
29
Shots
9

=== Statistics ===
==== Top 10 scorers ====
Pos	Player	Country	GP	G	A	Pts	+/–	PIM
1	Korney Korneyev	Kazakhstan	5	6	6	12	+7	2
2	Konstantin Hutzinger	Austria	5	5	7	12	+2	2
3	Niklas Aaram Olsen	Norway	5	6	4	10	+4	2
4	Tinus Luc Koblar	Norway	5	5	5	10	+10	12
4	Jorgen Myhre	Norway	5	5	5	10	+7	4
6	Mikkel Eriksen	Norway	5	3	7	10	+5	2
6	Elias Vatne	Norway	5	3	7	10	+8	4
8	Johannes Neumann	Austria	5	3	6	9	–1	4
8	Alisher Sarkenov	Kazakhstan	5	3	6	9	0	6
10	Vasily Zelenov	Austria	5	2	7	9	+1	20

GP = Games played; G = Goals; A = Assists; Pts = Points; +/− = P Plus–minus; PIM = Penalties In Minutes
Source: IIHF

==== Goaltending leaders ====
(minimum 40% team's total ice time)

Pos	Player	Country	TOI	GA	Sv%	GAA	SO
1	Albert Englund	Norway	210:24	7	92.22	2.00	0
2	Dmitriy Ryashin	Kazakhstan	181:26	12	89.83	3.97	0
3	Alexander Levshyn	Ukraine	208:20	14	87.83	4.03	0
4	Gal Hebar	Slovenia	157:07	11	87.36	4.20	0
5	Guillaume Schoch	France	164:00	14	86.41	5.12	0

TOI = Time on ice (minutes:seconds); GA = Goals against; GAA = Goals against average; Sv% = Save percentage; SO = Shutouts
Source: IIHF

==== Best Players Selected by the Directorate ====
- Goaltender: (Norway) Albert Englund
- Defenceman: (Slovenia) Jan Goličič
- Forward: (Norway) Tinus Luc Koblar

== Division I B ==
2026 IIHF U20 World Championship Division I B

Tournament details
- Host country: Italy
- City: Milan
- Venue: 1 (in 1 host city)
- Dates: 8–14 December 2025
- Teams: 6
- Promoted: Hungary
- Relegated: Italy

Tournament statistics
- Games played: 15
- Goals scored: 82 (5.47 per game)
- Attendance: 8,212 (547 per game)
- Scoring leader: (Estonia) David Timofejev (12 points)

Official website
- www.iihf.com

The Division I B tournament was played in Milan, Italy, from 8 to 14 December 2025.

=== Participating teams ===
Team	Qualification
Hungary	placed 6th in Division I A last year and were relegated
Japan	placed 2nd in Division I B last year
Italy (hosts)	placed 3rd in Division I B last year
Estonia	placed 4th in Division I B last year
Poland	placed 5th in Division I B last year
Lithuania	placed 1st in Division II A last year and were promoted

=== Final standings ===
Pos	Team	Pld	W	OTW	OTL	L	GF	GA	GD	Pts	Promotion or relegation
1	Hungary	5	3	1	0	1	18	9	+9	11	Promoted to the 2027 Division I A
2	Estonia	5	2	1	1	1	18	14	+4	9 (Note: Head-to-head points: Estonia 3, Lithuania 0)	
3	Lithuania	5	3	0	0	2	10	11	−1	9	
4	Poland	5	2	0	2	1	13	13	0	8	
5	Japan	5	1	1	0	3	12	16	−4	5	
6	Italy (H)	5	1	0	0	4	11	19	−8	3	Relegated to the 2027 Division II A

Source: IIHF
Rules for classification: 1) points; 2) head-to-head points; 3) head-to-head goal difference; 4) head-to-head number of goals scored; 5) result against closest best-ranked team outside tied teams; 6) result against next best-ranked team outside tied teams; 7) seeding before tournament.
(H) Host

=== Match results ===
All times are local (CET; UTC+1).

8 December 2025; 12:00	Estonia	3–4 GWS (2–0, 1–2, 0–1) (OT: 0–0) (SO: 0–1)	Japan	Milano Rho Ice Hockey Arena, Milan; Attendance: TBD

Game reference

Simon Sildre
Goalies
Yuichiro Takase
Referees:
(Canada) Shauna Neary
(Czech Republic) Zuzana Svobodová
Linesmen:
(United States) Sarah Buckner
(Czech Republic) Kristýna Hájková

Burkov (Morozov, D. Timofejev) – 00:28	1–0
Koltsov (Heitkov, Tammert) – 05:30	2–0
Tammert (Antonov, Koltsov) – 24:40	3–0
	3–1	36:58 – Ibe (Takashima, Kudoh)
	3–2	39:38 – Seki (Nakaya, Hotta)
	3–3	46:25 – Nakaya (Seki, Takase)

Tammert (miss)
D. Timofejev (miss)
Burkov (miss)
Orlov (miss)
Shootout
Nakaya
(miss) Hifumi
Ibe
(miss) Seki
10 min
Penalties
6 min
40
Shots
26

8 December 2025; 16:00	Poland	4–2 (1–1, 2–0, 1–1)	Italy	Milano Rho Ice Hockey Arena, Milan; Attendance: TBD

Game reference

Tobiasz Jaworski
Goalies
Carlo Giordani
Referees:
(Canada) Michelle McKenna
(Canada) Cianna Murray
Linesmen:
(Canada) Justine Todd
(Canada) Erin Zach

	0–1	01:42 – Winkler (Rigoni, Tolomelli) (PP)
McGovern (Onak, Stolarski) (SH) – 11:19	1–1
Gumiński (Wojciechowski) – 26:02	2–1
Janik (Skrzypski) – 39:33	3–1
	3–2	55:35 – Meneghetti (Tolomelli, De Luca)
Sawicki (Makuła) (PP)	4–2

8 min
Penalties
4 min
34
Shots
22

8 December 2025; 20:00	Lithuania	0–4 (0–1, 0–2, 0–1)	Hungary	Milano Rho Ice Hockey Arena, Milan; Attendance: TBD

Game reference

Daniil Cepov
Goalies
Benedek Gyulai
Referees:
(Sweden) Ida Henriksson
(United States) Samantha Hiller
Linesmen:
(Canada) Laura Gutauskas
(Finland) Tiina Saarimäki

0–1	11:15 – Szongoth (Mayer)
0–2	27:22 – Laskawy (Franyó)
0–3	27:41 – Fehér (Lobenwein, Vén)
0–4	59:13 – Fehér (Rapos) (ENG)

4 min
Penalties
10 min
33
Shots
20

9 December 2025; 12:15	Japan	1–2 (0–1, 0–1, 1–0)	Poland	Milano Rho Ice Hockey Arena, Milan; Attendance: 2,891

Game reference

Sazuku Kudo
Goalies
Igor Tyczyński
Referees:
(Canada) Cianna Murray
(Czech Republic) Zuzana Svobodová
Linesmen:
(Canada) Justine Todd
(Canada) Kirsten Welsh

	0–1	02:12 – Janik (Zachariasz, Skrzypski)
	0–2	39:25 – Petrażycki
Ishii – 51:47	1–2

6 min
Penalties
6 min
30
Shots
25

9 December 2025; 16:00	Hungary	3–1 (2–1, 0–0, 1–0)	Estonia	Milano Rho Ice Hockey Arena, Milan; Attendance: 497

Game reference

Benedek Gyulai
Goalies
Simon Sildre
Referees:
(United States) Samantha Hiller
(Finland) Anniina Nurmi
Linesmen:
(United States) Sarah Buckner
(Czech Republic) Kristýna Hájková

	0–1	03:11 – D. Timofejev (Burkov)
Baróti (Zimányi) – 09:25	1–1
Rapos (Lobenwein) – 09:46	2–1
Fehér (Lobenwein, Szongoth) – 41:25	3–1

6 min
Penalties
10 min
27
Shots
22

9 December 2025; 20:00	Italy	2–4 (1–0, 1–3, 0–1	Lithuania	Milano Rho Ice Hockey Arena, Milan; Attendance: 1,123

Game reference

Riccardo Santangelo
Goalies
Daniil Cepov
Referees:
(Sweden) Ida Henriksson
(Canada) Michelle McKenna
Linesmen:
(Canada) Laura Gutauskas
(Canada) Erin Zach

Gesumaria (PP) – 16:33	1–0
	1–1	34:03 – Čečekovas (Baltrūnas, Šulinskas)
Ferretti (Meneghetti) – 35:54	2–1
	2–2	37:11 – Jukna (Zeynalov, Sadauskas)
	2–3	39:43 – Škadauskas (Kovalenko, Jaras)
	2–4	55:28 – Čečekovas

8 min
Penalties
14 min
21
Shots
29

11 December 2025; 12:00	Lithuania	1–4 (0–1, 0–0, 1–3)	Estonia	Milano Rho Ice Hockey Arena, Milan; Attendance: TBD

Game reference

Daniil Cepov
Goalies
Simon Sildre
Referees:
(United States) Samantha Hiller
(Canada) Michelle McKenna
Linesmen:
(United States) Sarah Buckner
(Canada) Justine Todd

	0–1	10:30 – Morozov (Antonov, Timofejev) (PP2)
Boravski (Škadauskas, Zeynalov) – 41:21	1–1
	1–2	46:35 – Kookmaa (SH)
	1–3	50:52 – Timofejev (Burkov, Antonov) (PP)
	1–4	58:09 – Timofejev (Morozov) (ENG)

43 min
Penalties
14 min
23
Shots
26

11 December 2025; 16:00	Hungary	4–3 OT (0–0, 2–2, 1–1) (OT: 1–0)	Poland	Milano Rho Ice Hockey Arena, Milan; Attendance: TBD

Game reference

Benedek Gyulai
Goalies
Igor Tyczyński
Referees:
(Canada) Cianna Murray
(Canada) Shauna Neary
Linesmen:
(Czech Republic) Kristýna Hájková
(Canada) Kirsten Welsh

	0–1	20:49 – Sawicki (McGovern, Stolarski)
Lobenwein (Nagy) – 21:33	1–1
Mayer (Laskawy, Szivak) – 29:37	2–1
	2–2	31:30 – Makula (Hanzel, McGovern) (PP)
	2–3	52:16 – Drabik (Makula)
Szongoth (Laskawy, Franyó) – 53:13	3–3
Ferenc (Szongoth, Horváth) – 62:32	4–3

6 min
Penalties
2 min
27
Shots
21

11 December 2025; 20:00	Japan	5–1 (1–1, 4–0, 0–0)	Italy	Milano Rho Ice Hockey Arena, Milan; Attendance: TBD

Game reference

Sazuku Kudo
Goalies
Carlo Giordani
Riccardo Santangelo
Referees:
(Finland) Anniina Nurmi
(Czech Republic) Zuzana Svobodová
Linesmen:
(Canada) Laura Gutauskas
(Finland) Tiina Saarimäki

	0–1	4:08 – de Luca (Meneghetti, Gesumaria) (PP)
Nakaya (Seki, Miura) – 15:20	1–1
Nakaya (Seki, Miura) (PP) – 26:01	2–1
Odermatt (Hifumi) – 27:57	3–1
Miura (Daikuhara, Seki) – 32:36	4–1
Ibe (Takashima) – 39:52	5–1

8 min
Penalties
6 min
25
Shots
27

13 December 2025; 12:00	Estonia	5–4 OT (0–2, 3–2, 1–0) (OT: 1–0)	Poland	Milano Rho Ice Hockey Arena, Milan; Attendance: TBD

Game reference

Simon Sildre
Goalies
Tobiasz Jaworski
Referees:
(Sweden) Ida Henriksson
(Canada) Shauna Neary
Linesmen:
(Czech Republic) Kristýna Hájková
(Canada) Justine Todd

	0–1	02:39 – Bieda
	0–2	12:46 – Zachariasz (Janik)
Abeljanov (Frolkov, Masljonov) – 21:56	1–2
	1–3	22:28 – Petrażycki
Frolkov – 27:28	2–3
Antonov (Tammert, Burkov) – 31:32	3–3
	3–4	32:53 – Majkowski (Wilczok, Zachariasz)
Burkov (Antonov, Timofejev) (EA) – 59:48	4–4
Timofejev (Burkov, Maslov)	5–4

2 min
Penalties
4 min
37
Shots
23

13 December 2025; 16:00	Japan	1–4 (0–1, 1–2, 0–1)	Lithuania	Milano Rho Ice Hockey Arena, Milan; Attendance: TBD

Game reference

Sazuku Kudo
Goalies
Naglis Vaišvila
Referees:
(United States) Samantha Hiller
(Czech Republic) Zuzana Svobodová
Linesmen:
(United States) Sarah Buckner
(Canada) Erin Zach

	0–1	03:31 – Jukna (Jaras, Čečekovas)
	0–2	23:54 – Jukna (Baltrūnas, Čečekovas)
Hifumi (Odermatt) – 27:59	1–2
	1–3	34:38 – Krakauskas (Zeynalov, Škadauskas) (PP)
	1–4	49:13 – Čečekovas (Jukna, Adakauskas)

6 min
Penalties
4 min
23
Shots
32

13 December 2025; 20:00	Italy	4–1 (1–1, 1–0, 2–0)	Hungary	Milano Rho Ice Hockey Arena, Milan; Attendance: TBD

Game reference

Filippo Matonti
Goalies
Benedek Gyulai
Referees:
(Canada) Cianna Murray
(Finland) Anniina Nurmi
Linesmen:
(Finland) Tiina Saarimäki
(Canada) Kirsten Welsh

Winkler (Pardatscher) – 04:01	1–0
	1–1	16:02 – Laskawy (Szongoth, Nitz) (PP)
Parco (Rigoni, Nitz) – 32:58	2–1
De Luca (Gesumaria, Pardatscher) (PP) – 47:08	3–1
De Luca (Meneghetti) – 54:00	4–1

8 min
Penalties
8 min
19
Shots
37

14 December 2025; 12:00	Poland	0–1 (0–0, 0–1, 0–0)	Lithuania	Milano Rho Ice Hockey Arena, Milan; Attendance: 1,473

Game reference
Igor Tyczyński	Goalies	Daniil Cepov	Referees: (Canada) Shauna Neary (Finland) Anniina Nurmi; Linesmen: (United States) Sarah Buckner (Canada) Laura Gutauskas
0–1 / 30:38 – Sobolev (Krakauskas)			Referees: (Canada) Shauna Neary (Finland) Anniina Nurmi; Linesmen: (United States) Sarah Buckner (Canada) Laura Gutauskas
0 min	Penalties	2 min	Referees: (Canada) Shauna Neary (Finland) Anniina Nurmi; Linesmen: (United States) Sarah Buckner (Canada) Laura Gutauskas
15	Shots	29	Referees: (Canada) Shauna Neary (Finland) Anniina Nurmi; Linesmen: (United States) Sarah Buckner (Canada) Laura Gutauskas

14 December 2025; 16:00	Italy	2–5 (1–1, 1–1, 0–3)	Estonia	Milano Rho Ice Hockey Arena, Milan; Attendance: 1,705

Game reference

Filippo Ferretti
Goalies
Simon Sildre
Referees:
(Sweden) Ida Henriksson
(Canada) Michelle McKenna
Linesmen:
(Finland) Tiina Saarimäki
(Canada) Erin Zach

Ferretti – 06:51	1–0
	1–1	17:07 – Tammert (Morozov, Timofejev) (PP)
	1–2	20:43 – Timofejev (Burkov) (SH)
Ferretti (Parco) (SH) – 38:04	2–2
	2–3	44:20 – Timofejev (Kalamees)
	2–4	46:21 – Burkov (Timofejev)
	2–5	53:17 – Timofejev (Antonov, Burkov)

12 min
Penalties
6 min
30
Shots
38

14 December 2025; 20:00	Hungary	6–1 (2–0, 3–1, 1–0)	Japan	Milano Rho Ice Hockey Arena, Milan; Attendance: 523

Game reference

Benedek Gyulai
Goalies
Yuichiro Takase
Jei Yamabayashi
Referees:
(United States) Samantha Hiller
(Canada) Cianna Murray
Linesmen:
(Canada) Justine Todd
(Canada) Kirsten Welsh

Fehér (Lobenwein, Vén) (SH) – 02:58	1–0
Laskawy (Szongoth) – 12:16	2–0
	2–1	24:45 – Hifumi (Ibe) (PP)
Szongoth (Laskawy, Mayer) – 21:51	3–1
Schwartz – 22:05	4–1
Ven (Lobenwein, Mayer) (PP) – 26:55	5–1
Laskawy (Horváth, Szongoth) – 53:57	6–1

6 min
Penalties
4 min
31
Shots
25

=== Statistics ===
==== Top 10 scorers ====
Pos	Player	Country	GP	G	A	Pts	+/–	PIM
1	David Timofejev	Estonia	5	7	5	12	+6	2
2	Maksim Burkov	Estonia	5	3	6	9	+5	4
3	Ferenc Laskawy	Hungary	5	5	3	8	+5	6
4	Domán Szongoth	Hungary	5	3	4	7	+4	4
5	Nikita Antonov	Estonia	5	1	5	6	+5	2
5	Balint Lobenwein	Hungary	5	1	5	6	+6	0
7	Danielius Čečekovas	Lithuania	5	3	2	5	+2	0
8	Ryota Seki	Japan	5	1	4	5	–1	0
9	Kolos Fehér	Hungary	5	4	0	4	+7	0
10	Jacopo de Luca	Italy	5	3	1	4	0	0
10	Dovydas Jukna	Lithuania	5	3	1	4	+4	2
10	Saishiro Nakaya	Japan	5	3	1	4	–1	0

GP = Games played; G = Goals; A = Assists; Pts = Points; +/− = P Plus–minus; PIM = Penalties In Minutes
Source: IIHF

==== Goaltending leaders ====
(minimum 40% team's total ice time)

Pos	Player	Country	TOI	GA	Sv%	GAA	SO
1	Igor Tyczyński	Poland	181:32	6	93.02	1.98	0
2	Benedek Gyulai	Hungary	302:32	9	92.50	1.78	1
3	Sazuku Kudo	Japan	176:48	7	91.67	2.38	0
4	Daniil Cepov	Lithuania	238:36	8	90.00	2.01	1
5	Simon Sildre	Estonia	302:44	13	89.84	2.58	0

TOI = Time on ice (minutes:seconds); GA = Goals against; GAA = Goals against average; Sv% = Save percentage; SO = Shutouts
Source: IIHF

==== Best Players Selected by the Directorate ====
- Goaltender: (Poland) Igor Tyczyński
- Defenceman: (Lithuania) Daniil Kovalenko
- Forward: (Estonia) Maksim Burkov
