= 2027 World Junior Ice Hockey Championships =

Ice hockey tournament in Alberta, Canada

2027 IIHF World Junior Championship

Tournament details
- Host country: Canada
- Cities: Edmonton; Red Deer
- Venues: 2 (in 2 host cities)
- Dates: December 26, 2026 – January 5, 2027
- Teams: 10

Official website
- www.iihf.com

The 2027 World Junior Ice Hockey Championships (2027 WJC) will be the 51st Ice Hockey World Junior Championships organized by the IIHF. There are seven tournament tiers. The top division will begin December 26, 2026, and end with the gold medal game on January 5, 2027.

== Top Division ==
=== Background ===
This marks the 20th time that Canada will host the competition, as the Canadian team seeks to earn their 37th medal all time, which would tie rivals Russia. The tournament returns to Edmonton for the 5th time, which last hosted the 2022 competition. Red Deer also previously co-hosted the 1995 competition alongside Edmonton and Calgary.

=== Venues ===
The tournament games will be played at two arenas:

- Rogers Place in Edmonton, and
- Marchant Crane Centrium in Red Deer.

Edmonton	2027 World Junior Ice Hockey Championships is located in Canada	Red Deer
Rogers Place Capacity: 18,347	2027 World Junior Ice Hockey Championships is located in Canada	Marchant Crane Centrium Capacity: 7,111

=== Qualified teams ===
Ten teams are scheduled to take part in the competition. Norway was expected to return for the first time since 2024, replacing Denmark who were relegated back to Division I, Group A, after finishing last in 2026.

On October 30, 2026, the Court of Arbitration for Sport released its decision on an application brought by the Russian Ice Hockey Federation, holding that the IIHF must reinstate Russia to all international competitions, although a method to do such was not prescribed. The hockey federations of Czechia, Finland, Latvia, Norway, Sweden, and Switzerland reacted by announcing their refusal to face Russia. On November 4, Canadian Prime Minister Mark Carney said that the Canadian government will not grant visas to Russian athletes, staff, and other members of a Russian ice hockey delegation. On November 8, the Norwegian hockey association reported that the IIHF had removed its team from the tournament to make room for Russia. On November 15, the IIHF confirmed that due to the Canadian government's position, Russia is unable to participate. On the same day, the Russian federation announced its intention to appeal the decision to the International Olympic Committee and seek compensation for the exclusion.

Team	Qualification method	Appearance(s) (Note: In top division. Results in tiers below are excluded.)				Previous best performance (Note: Bold text indicates they hosted that edition.)
Team	Qualification method	Total	First	Last	Streak	Previous best performance
Sweden	First in 2026	51st	1977	2026	51	**Champions** (1981, 2012, 2026)
Czechia	Second in 2026	51st	1977	2026	51	**Champions** (2000, 2001)
Canada	Third in 2026	51st	1977	2026	51	**Champions** (20 times) (Note: Canada has won in 1982, 1985, 1988, 1990, 1991, 1993, 1994, 1995, 1996, 1997, 2005, 2006, 2007, 2008, 2009, 2015, 2018, 2020, 2022, and 2023.)
Finland	Fourth in 2026	51st	1977	2026	51	**Champions** (1987, **1998**, 2014, **2016**, 2019)
United States	Fifth in 2026	51st	1977	2026	51	**Champions** (2004, 2010, 2013, 2017, 2021, 2024, 2025)
Switzerland	Sixth in 2026	40th	1978	2026	18	Third place (1998)
Latvia	Seventh in 2026	12th	2006	2026	6	Seventh place (2022, 2025, 2026)
Slovakia	Eighth in 2026	32nd	1996	2026	32	Third place (1999, 2015)
Germany	Ninth in 2026	33rd	1977	2026	8	Fifth place (**1981**)
Norway	Champions of 2026 Division I A	10th	1979	2024	1	Sixth place (1990)

=== Match officials ===
The match officials assigned by the IIHF to officiate the 2026 World Junior Championships have not yet been announced.

=== Rosters ===
To be eligible as a junior player, a player cannot have been born earlier than 2007. A maximum of 22 skaters and 3 goalkeepers can be named to a roster, with a maximum of 20 skaters and 2 goalkeepers dressing each game.

=== Preliminary round ===
==== Seeding ====
The preliminary group distribution is based on the order of finish at the 2026 World Junior Championship, with promoted Norway taking the place of relegated Denmark. Tournament organizers did not exercise the option to swap two of the teams to boost attendance.

Group A
(Marchant Crane Centrium)

- Sweden (1)
- Finland (4)
- United States (5)
- Slovakia (8)
- Germany (9)

Group B
(Rogers Place)

- Czechia (2)
- Canada (3) **(H)**
- Switzerland (6)
- Latvia (7)
- Norway (11–Promoted)

Tie-breaking criteria
The ranking of teams in the group stage was determined as follows:
1. points;
2. head-to-head points;
3. head-to-head goal difference;
4. head-to-head number of goals scored;
5. result against closest best-ranked team outside tied teams;
6. result against next best-ranked team outside tied teams;
7. seeding before tournament.

All times are local, CST (UTC−6).

==== Group A ====
Pos	Team	Pld	W	OTW	OTL	L	GF	GA	GD	Pts	Qualification
1	Sweden	0	0	0	0	0	0	0	0	**0**	Quarterfinals
2	Finland	0	0	0	0	0	0	0	0	**0**	Quarterfinals
3	United States	0	0	0	0	0	0	0	0	**0**	Quarterfinals
4	Slovakia	0	0	0	0	0	0	0	0	**0**	Quarterfinals
5	Germany	0	0	0	0	0	0	0	0	**0**	Relegation round

First match(es) will be played: December 26, 2026. Source: IIHF
Rules for classification: Tiebreakers

December 26, 2026; 2:30pm	Sweden	v	Finland	Marchant Crane Centrium, Red Deer

December 26, 2026; 7:30pm	United States	v	Germany	Marchant Crane Centrium, Red Deer

December 27, 2026; 2:30pm	Slovakia	v	Sweden	Marchant Crane Centrium, Red Deer

December 27, 2026; 7:30pm	Germany	v	Finland	Marchant Crane Centrium, Red Deer

December 28, 2026; 2:30pm	Slovakia	v	United States	Marchant Crane Centrium, Red Deer

December 29, 2026; 2:30pm	Finland	v	United States	Marchant Crane Centrium, Red Deer

December 29, 2026; 7:30pm	Sweden	v	Germany	Marchant Crane Centrium, Red Deer

December 30, 2026; 4:30pm	Germany	v	Slovakia	Marchant Crane Centrium, Red Deer

December 31, 2026; 2:30pm	Finland	v	Slovakia	Marchant Crane Centrium, Red Deer

December 31, 2026; 7:30pm	United States	v	Sweden	Marchant Crane Centrium, Red Deer

==== Group B ====
Pos	Team	Pld	W	OTW	OTL	L	GF	GA	GD	Pts	Qualification
1	Czechia	0	0	0	0	0	0	0	0	**0**	Quarterfinals
2	Canada (H)	0	0	0	0	0	0	0	0	**0**	Quarterfinals
3	Switzerland	0	0	0	0	0	0	0	0	**0**	Quarterfinals
4	Latvia	0	0	0	0	0	0	0	0	**0**	Quarterfinals
5	Norway	0	0	0	0	0	0	0	0	**0**	Relegation round

First match(es) will be played: December 26, 2026. Source: IIHF
Rules for classification: Tiebreakers
(H) Host

December 26, 2026; 12:00pm	Czechia	v	Norway	Rogers Place, Edmonton

December 26, 2026; 5:00pm	Canada	v	Switzerland	Rogers Place, Edmonton

December 27, 2026; 12:00pm	Latvia	v	Czechia	Rogers Place, Edmonton

December 27, 2026; 5:00pm	Switzerland	v	Norway	Rogers Place, Edmonton

December 28, 2026; 5:00pm	Canada	v	Latvia	Rogers Place, Edmonton

December 29, 2026; 12:00pm	Switzerland	v	Czechia	Rogers Place, Edmonton

December 29, 2026; 5:00pm	Norway	v	Canada	Rogers Place, Edmonton

December 30, 2026; 1:00pm	Norway	v	Latvia	Rogers Place, Edmonton

December 31, 2026; 12:00pm	Latvia	v	Switzerland	Rogers Place, Edmonton

December 31, 2026; 5:00pm	Czechia	v	Canada	Rogers Place, Edmonton

=== Relegation round ===
January 2, 2027; 10:00am	A5	v	B5	Rogers Place, Edmonton

=== Playoff round ===
Quarterfinal winners will be reseeded for the semifinals in accordance with the following ranking:

1. Placement in group
2. Points in preliminary round
3. Goal differential in preliminary round
4. Number of goals scored in preliminary round
5. Seeding coming into the tournament

Rank	Team	Group	Pos	Pts	GD	GF	Seed
1			1				
2			1				
3			2				
4			2				
5			3				
6			3				
7			4				
8			4				

==== Bracket ====
Quarterfinals
January 2
1A
4B
January 2
2A
3B
January 2
1B
4A
January 2
2B
3A

Semifinals
January 4 – Rogers Place
January 4 – Rogers Place

Final
January 5 – Rogers Place
Third place
January 5 – Rogers Place

==== Quarterfinals ====
January 2, 2027; 12:00pm	v	Marchant Crane Centrium, Red Deer

January 2, 2027; 2:30pm	v	Rogers Place, Edmonton

January 2, 2027; 5:00pm	v	Marchant Crane Centrium, Red Deer

January 2, 2027; 7:30pm	v	Rogers Place, Edmonton

==== Semifinals ====
January 4, 2027; 3:30pm	v	Rogers Place, Edmonton

January 4, 2027; 7:30pm	v	Rogers Place, Edmonton

==== Bronze medal game ====
January 5, 2027; 3:30pm	v	Rogers Place, Edmonton

==== Gold medal game ====
January 5, 2027; 7:30pm	v	Rogers Place, Edmonton

== Division I ==
=== Division I A ===
The Division I A tournament will be played in Budapest, Hungary, between December 6 and 12, 2026.

==== Group A ====
Pos	Team	Pld	W	OTW	OTL	L	GF	GA	GD	Pts	Promotion or relegation
1	Denmark	0	0	0	0	0	0	0	0	0	Semifinals
2	Slovenia	0	0	0	0	0	0	0	0	0	Semifinals
3	Ukraine	0	0	0	0	0	0	0	0	0	Placement series

First match(es) will be played: 6 December 2026. Source: IIHF
Rules for classification: 1) points; 2) head-to-head points; 3) head-to-head goal difference; 4) head-to-head number of goals scored; 5) result against closest best-ranked team outside tied teams; 6) result against next best-ranked team outside tied teams; 7) seeding before tournament.

==== Group B ====
Pos	Team	Pld	W	OTW	OTL	L	GF	GA	GD	Pts	Promotion or relegation
1	Kazakhstan	0	0	0	0	0	0	0	0	0	Semifinals
2	Austria	0	0	0	0	0	0	0	0	0	Semifinals
3	Hungary (H)	0	0	0	0	0	0	0	0	0	Placement series

First match(es) will be played: 6 December 2026. Source: IIHF
Rules for classification: 1) points; 2) head-to-head points; 3) head-to-head goal difference; 4) head-to-head number of goals scored; 5) result against closest best-ranked team outside tied teams; 6) result against next best-ranked team outside tied teams; 7) seeding before tournament.
(H) Host

==== Bracket ====
Placement series
3A
3B

Semifinals
1A
2B
1B
2A

Final
Third place

=== Division I B ===
The Division I B tournament will be played in Krynica-Zdrój, Poland, between December 5 and 11, 2026.

==== Group A ====
Pos	Team	Pld	W	OTW	OTL	L	GF	GA	GD	Pts	Promotion or relegation
1	France	0	0	0	0	0	0	0	0	0	Semifinals
2	Poland (H)	0	0	0	0	0	0	0	0	0	Semifinals
3	Japan	0	0	0	0	0	0	0	0	0	Placement series

First match(es) will be played: 5 December 2026. Source: IIHF
Rules for classification: 1) points; 2) head-to-head points; 3) head-to-head goal difference; 4) head-to-head number of goals scored; 5) result against closest best-ranked team outside tied teams; 6) result against next best-ranked team outside tied teams; 7) seeding before tournament.
(H) Host

==== Group B ====
Pos	Team	Pld	W	OTW	OTL	L	GF	GA	GD	Pts	Promotion or relegation
1	Estonia	0	0	0	0	0	0	0	0	0	Semifinals
2	Lithuania	0	0	0	0	0	0	0	0	0	Semifinals
3	South Korea	0	0	0	0	0	0	0	0	0	Placement series

First match(es) will be played: 5 December 2026. Source: IIHF
Rules for classification: 1) points; 2) head-to-head points; 3) head-to-head goal difference; 4) head-to-head number of goals scored; 5) result against closest best-ranked team outside tied teams; 6) result against next best-ranked team outside tied teams; 7) seeding before tournament.

==== Bracket ====
Placement series
3A
3B

Semifinals
1A
2B
1B
2A

Final
Third place

== Division II ==
=== Division II A ===
The Division II A tournament will be played in Zagreb, Croatia, between January 10 and 16, 2027.

==== Group A ====
Pos	Team	Pld	W	OTW	OTL	L	GF	GA	GD	Pts	Promotion or relegation
1	Italy	0	0	0	0	0	0	0	0	0	Semifinals
2	Romania	0	0	0	0	0	0	0	0	0	Semifinals
3	China	0	0	0	0	0	0	0	0	0	Placement series

First match(es) will be played: 10 January 2027. Source: IIHF
Rules for classification: 1) points; 2) head-to-head points; 3) head-to-head goal difference; 4) head-to-head number of goals scored; 5) result against closest best-ranked team outside tied teams; 6) result against next best-ranked team outside tied teams; 7) seeding before tournament.

==== Group B ====
Pos	Team	Pld	W	OTW	OTL	L	GF	GA	GD	Pts	Promotion or relegation
1	Great Britain	0	0	0	0	0	0	0	0	0	Semifinals
2	Croatia (H)	0	0	0	0	0	0	0	0	0	Semifinals
3	Netherlands	0	0	0	0	0	0	0	0	0	Placement series

First match(es) will be played: 10 January 2027. Source: IIHF
Rules for classification: 1) points; 2) head-to-head points; 3) head-to-head goal difference; 4) head-to-head number of goals scored; 5) result against closest best-ranked team outside tied teams; 6) result against next best-ranked team outside tied teams; 7) seeding before tournament.
(H) Host

==== Bracket ====
Placement series
3A
3B

Semifinals
1A
2B
1B
2A

Final
Third place

=== Division II B ===
The Division II B tournament will be played in Belgrade, Serbia, between January 17 and 23, 2027.

==== Group A ====
Pos	Team	Pld	W	OTW	OTL	L	GF	GA	GD	Pts	Promotion or relegation
1	Spain	0	0	0	0	0	0	0	0	0	Semifinals
2	Serbia (H)	0	0	0	0	0	0	0	0	0	Semifinals
3	New Zealand	0	0	0	0	0	0	0	0	0	Placement series

First match(es) will be played: 17 January 2027. Source: IIHF
Rules for classification: 1) points; 2) head-to-head points; 3) head-to-head goal difference; 4) head-to-head number of goals scored; 5) result against closest best-ranked team outside tied teams; 6) result against next best-ranked team outside tied teams; 7) seeding before tournament.
(H) Host

==== Group B ====
Pos	Team	Pld	W	OTW	OTL	L	GF	GA	GD	Pts	Promotion or relegation
1	Australia	0	0	0	0	0	0	0	0	0	Semifinals
2	Israel	0	0	0	0	0	0	0	0	0	Semifinals
3	Chinese Taipei	0	0	0	0	0	0	0	0	0	Placement series

First match(es) will be played: 17 January 2027. Source: IIHF
Rules for classification: 1) points; 2) head-to-head points; 3) head-to-head goal difference; 4) head-to-head number of goals scored; 5) result against closest best-ranked team outside tied teams; 6) result against next best-ranked team outside tied teams; 7) seeding before tournament.

==== Bracket ====
Placement series
3A
3B

Semifinals
1A
2B
1B
2A

Final
Third place

== Division III ==
=== Division III A ===
The Division III A tournament will be played in Istanbul, Turkey, between January 18 and 24, 2027.

- Belgium
- Bulgaria
- Iceland – relegated from Division II B
- Kyrgyzstan – promoted from Division III B
- Thailand
- Turkey

=== Division III B ===
The Division III B tournament will be played in Sarajevo, Bosnia and Herzegovina, between February 3 and 8, 2027.

- Bosnia and Herzegovina – relegated from Division III A
- Hong Kong
- Luxembourg
- Mexico
- South Africa

== Division IV ==
The Division IV tournament will be played in Tbilisi, Georgia, between January 10 and 16, 2027.

- Georgia
- India
- Iran – relegated from Division III B
- Turkmenistan
