= 2026 World Junior Ice Hockey Championships – Division II =

International youth ice hockey tournament

2026 IIHF U20 World Championship Division II
Tournament details
- Host countries: Romania; Serbia
- Venues: 2 (in 2 host cities)
- Dates: 4–10 and 18–24 January 2026
- Teams: 12

The 2026 World Junior Ice Hockey Championship Division II were two international under-20 ice hockey tournaments organized by the International Ice Hockey Federation. Division II A represents the fourth tier and Division II B the fifth tier of the IIHF World Junior Championship. For each tier, the first-placed team was promoted to the next higher tier, while the last-placed team was relegated to the next lower tier.

To be eligible as a junior player in these tournaments, a player couldn't be born earlier than 2006.

== Division II A ==
2026 IIHF U20 World Championship Division II A

Tournament details
- Host country: Romania
- City: Bucharest
- Venue: 1 (in 1 host city)
- Dates: 4–10 January 2026
- Teams: 6

Tournament statistics
- Games played: 15
- Goals scored: 108 (7.2 per game)
- Attendance: 8,601 (573 per game)
- Scoring leader: (South Korea) Kim Jung-jun (15 points)

Official website
- www.iihf.com

The Division II A tournament was played in Bucharest, Romania, from 4 to 10 January 2026.

=== Participating teams ===
Team	Qualification
South Korea	placed 6th in Division I B last year and were relegated
Romania (hosts)	placed 2nd in Division II A last year
Croatia	placed 3rd in Division II A last year
Great Britain	placed 4th in Division II A last year
China	placed 5th in Division II A last year
Spain	placed 1st in Division II B last year and were promoted

=== Standings ===
Pos	Team	Pld	W	OTW	OTL	L	GF	GA	GD	Pts	Promotion or relegation
1	South Korea	5	5	0	0	0	33	6	+27	15	Promotion to the 2027 Division I B
2	Great Britain	5	3	1	0	1	15	13	+2	11	
3	Croatia	5	2	1	0	2	18	27	−9	8	
4	Romania (H)	5	1	1	1	2	16	19	−3	6	
5	China	5	1	0	2	2	15	18	−3	5	
6	Spain	5	0	0	0	5	11	25	−14	0	Relegation to the 2027 Division II B

Source: IIHF
Rules for classification: 1) points; 2) head-to-head points; 3) head-to-head goal difference; 4) head-to-head number of goals scored; 5) result against closest best-ranked team outside tied teams; 6) result against next best-ranked team outside tied teams; 7) seeding before tournament.
(H) Host

=== Results ===
All times are local, EET (UTC+2).

4 January 2026; 12:30	Croatia	2–12 (1–1, 0–5, 1–6)	South Korea	Berceni Arena, Bucharest; Attendance: 520

Game reference

Niksa Slade
Borna Jurin
Goalies
Park Sang-woo
Koh Taeyi
Referees:
(Sweden) Kristoffer Folkstrand
(United Kingdom) Oliver Trusswell
Linesmen:
(Romania) Barna Borsos
(Czech Republic) Frantisek Stepanek

	0–1	03:37 – Lee J. (Kim Ju., Lee G.) (PP)
Alić (Idžan) – 14:45	1–1
	1–2	24:33 – Kim B. (Lim S.)
	1–3	27:31 – Kim Ju. (Park S., Lim K.)
	1–4	30:17 – Kim Da. (Lee G., Kim Ju.) (SH)
	1–5	37:29 – Kim Da. (Lee G., Kim Ju.) (PP2)
	1–6	39:43 – Yoo (Park S.)
	1–7	40:13 – Kim Do. (Kim Da., Kim Ju.)
Kurjaković (Idžan) – 40:38	2–7
	2–8	44:28 – Lee J. (SH)
	2–9	49:17 – Yoo (Jung M., Kim Jian)
	2–10	50:09 – Kim Jian (Kim Jih.)
	2–11	51:00 – Kim K. (Kim Da., Kim Ju.)
	2–12	51:22 – Lee G. (Kim K.)

35 min
Penalties
12 min
10
Shots
47

4 January 2026; 16:00	Spain	3–4 (1–1, 1–2, 1–1)	Great Britain	Berceni Arena, Bucharest; Attendance: 530

Game reference

Guillermo Esteban
Goalies
Benjamin Clark Leech
Referees:
(Slovakia) Juraj Konc
(Austria) Jakob Schauer
Linesmen:
(Germany) Jonas Reinold
(Norway) Andreas Vyssios

	0–1	06:53 – Misins (Yates, Henderson) (PP)
Lacasta (Morillas, González) – 18:24	1–1
	1–2	26:36 – Henderson (Lynch)
	1–3	31:51 – Yates (Oksanen, Kay)
Pérez (Sanz, Pérez-Santamarina) (PP) – 39:14	2–3
	2–4	52:21 – Capps (Bennett)
González (Mazón) – 59:30	3–4

6 min
Penalties
8 min
19
Shots
47

4 January 2026; 19:30	Romania	4–3 GWS (2–1, 0–2, 1–0) (OT: 0–0) (SO: 1–0)	China	Berceni Arena, Bucharest; Attendance: 708

Game reference

Hunor Gergely
Goalies
Zhang Youyi
Referees:
(Ukraine) Oleg Serebriakov
(Latvia) Davis Zunde
Linesmen:
(Romania) Andries Gheorghies
(Poland) Eryk Sztwiertnia

Marton (Szekeres) (PP) – 03:14	1–0
	1–1	04:27 – Guo (Xu)
Marton (Szekeres, Agoston) (PP) – 07:34	2–1
	2–2	22:13 – Tian (Zhao, Huang)
	2–3	34:47 – Tian (Zhao)
Kovacs (Bolocan) – 47:53	3–3

Bolocan (miss)
Marton
Kovacs (miss)
Moise
Nagy (miss)
Moise (miss)
Marton (miss)
Timaru
Shootout
(miss) Gao
Xu
(miss) Tian
(miss) Guo
Jiang S.X.
(miss) Xu
(miss) Xu
(miss) Jiang S.X.
6 min
Penalties
32 min
39
Shots
24

5 January 2026; 12:30	South Korea	4–0 (2–0, 1–0, 1–0)	Great Britain	Berceni Arena, Bucharest; Attendance: 380

Game reference

Park Sang-woo
Goalies
Benjamin Clark Leech
Referees:
(Slovakia) Juraj Konc
(Ukraine) Oleg Serebriakov
Linesmen:
(United States) Thomas Dockery
(Romania) Andries Gheorghies

Kim K. (Sol E.) – 01:58	1–0
Lim S. (Kim B., Yoo) – 12:53 (PP)	2–0
Kim Do. (Kim Da., Kim Ju.) – 25:07 (PP)	3–0
Kim Do. (Kim Da., (Kim Ju.) – 43:13	4–0

16 min
Penalties
12 min
37
Shots
28

5 January 2026; 16:00	China	5–2 (1–1, 3–0, 1–1)	Spain	Berceni Arena, Bucharest; Attendance: 510

Game reference

Zhang Youyi
Goalies
Albert Bosch
Referees:
(Sweden) Kristoffer Folkstrand
(United Kingdom) Oliver Trusswell
Linesmen:
(Romania) Barna Borsos
(Czech Republic) Frantisek Stepanek

Huang (Zhao, Tian) – 09:17	1–0
	1–1	19:12 – Cabello (Pérez)
Jiang S.X. (Xu, Gao) – 20:45	2–1
Jiang (Gao, Guo) – 24:16 (PP)	3–1
Wen J. (Guo) – 38:05	4–1
	4–2	41:12 – González (Garkusha, Pérez)
Xu – 56:34	5–2

10 min
Penalties
37 min
45
Shots
30

5 January 2026; 19:30	Romania	5–6 OT (0–1, 4–2, 1–2) (OT: 0–1)	Croatia	Berceni Arena, Bucharest; Attendance: 780

Game reference

Hunor Gergely
Goalies
Niksa Slade
Referees:
(Canada) David Elford
(Austria) Jakob Schauer
Linesmen:
(Germany) Jonas Reinold
(Norway) Andreas Vyssios

	0–1	17:30 – Idžan (Gorsić, Zovko) (PP)
Bolocan (Moise) – 21:49	1–1
Marton (Agoston, Bolocan) (PP) – 25:38	2–1
	2–2	27:48 – Marojević (Gorsić, Svjetličić) (PP)
Bolocan – 31:56	3–2
	3–3	36:07 – Idžan (Kurjaković, Zlatar)
Moise (Timaru, Nagy) (PP) – 38:51	4–3
Marton (Bolocan) – 44:54	5–3
	5–4	49:17 – Gorsić (Svirčić, Martinec)
	5–5	55:13 – Svjetličić (Idžan, Gorsić) (PP)
	5–6	64:20 – Idžan (Gorsić)

12 min
Penalties
10 min
36
Shots
39

7 January 2026; 12:30	South Korea	4–1 (3–0, 0–0, 1–1)	China	Berceni Arena, Bucharest; Attendance: 580

Game reference

Park Sang-woo
Goalies
Wen Jiayou
Referees:
(Canada) David Elford
(Austria) Jakob Schauer
Linesmen:
(Germany) Jonas Reinold
(Poland) Eryk Sztwiertnia

Lim S. (Kim B.) (SH) – 13:26	1–0
Jung M. (Park S., Kim Jian) – 15:23	2–0
Kim B. (Kim Ju., Kim Do.) – 18:29	3–0
	3–1	48:55 – Wen J.H. (Zhao)
Kang (Lee J., Kim K.) – 55:30	4–1

6 min
Penalties
12 min
35
Shots
19

7 January 2026; 16:00	Croatia	2–5 (0–1, 1–1, 1–3)	Great Britain	Berceni Arena, Bucharest; Attendance: 590

Game reference

Niksa Slade
Goalies
Benjamin Clark Leech
Referees:
(Sweden) Kristoffer Folkstrand
(Latvia) Davis Zunde
Linesmen:
(Romania) Andries Gheorghies
(Czech Republic) Frantisek Stepanek

	0–1	08:17 – Clarke (Capps, Bruton)
	0–2	36:44 – Yates (Carruth)
Zovko – 39:38	1–2
Gorsić (Martinec) (SH) – 46:26	2–2
	2–3	48:16 – Lipsey (Kynaston)
	2–4	50:25 – Capps (Clarke) (PP)
	2–5	57:15 – Misins (SH, ENG)

12 min
Penalties
12 min
28
Shots
43

7 January 2026; 19:30	Romania	4–3 (0–0, 2–2, 2–1)	Spain	Berceni Arena, Bucharest; Attendance: 783

Game reference

Calin Mardale
Goalies
Guillermo Esteban
Referees:
(Slovakia) Juraj Konc
(United Kingdom) Oliver Trusswell
Linesmen:
(Romania) Barna Borsos
(United States) Thomas Dockery

	0–1	20:54 – Morillas (PP)
Nagy (Moise, Mathe) (PP) – 28:29	1–1
	1–2	30:57 – Martinez (Segurola)
Kovacs (Janos) – 33:42	2–2
	2–3	40:49 – Garkusha (Pérez-Santamarina, Cabello) (PP)
Timaru (Nechita, Mić) – 46:48	3–3
Kovacs (Agoston, Salamon) – 49:12	4–3

35 min
Penalties
14 min
48
Shots
21

8 January 2026; 12:30	China	3–4 (1–1, 1–1, 1–2)	Croatia	Berceni Arena, Bucharest; Attendance: 117

Game reference

Zhang Youyi
Goalies
Niksa Slade
Referees:
(Slovakia) Juraj Konc
(Ukraine) Oleg Serebriakov
Linesmen:
(United States) Thomas Dockery
(Norway) Andreas Vyssios

	0–1	07:36 – Idžan (Gorsić)
Wen J.H. (Wen X., Jiang W.H.) (PP) – 13:36	1–1
	1–2	32:59 – Idžan (Pranjić)
Guo (Weng X.) – 33:52	2–2
	2– 3	50:52 – Marojević (Pranjić)
	2–4	54:01 – Idžan (Gorsić)
Huang (Xu, Wen X.) – 57:23	3–4

16 min
Penalties
8 min
31
Shots
27

8 January 2026; 16:00	Spain	1–8 (0–4, 1–3, 0–1)	South Korea	Berceni Arena, Bucharest; Attendance: 538

Game reference

Albert Bosch
Goalies
Park Sang-woo
Lee Wook-young
Referees:
(Austria) Jakob Schauer
(Latvia) Davis Zunde
Linesmen:
(Romania) Andries Gheorghies
(Germany) Jonas Reinold

	0–1	01:05 – Kim K. (Lee J., Lim S.)
	0–2	14:07 – Kim Do. (Kim Ju., Kim B.)
	0–3	14:47 – Kim B. (Kim Ju., Park S.)
	0–4	16:06 – Kim Jian (Sol E., Jung M.)
Pérez – 22:01	1–4
	1–5	27:10 – Kim Do. (Kim B., Kim Ju.)
	1–6	33:27 – Lim S. (Kim Jian, Kim Jih.)
	1–7	37:38 – Park Ji. (Kang, Lee J.)
	1–8	41:14 – Lee J. (Park S., Kim K.) (SH)

16 min
Penalties
8 min
21
Shots
59

8 January 2026; 19:30	Great Britain	2–1 (1–0, 1–0, 0–1)	Romania	Berceni Arena, Bucharest; Attendance: 710

Game reference

Benjamin Clark Leech
Goalies
Calin Mardale
Referees:
(Canada) David Elford
(Sweden) Kristoffer Folkstrand
Linesmen:
(Czech Republic) Frantisek Stepanek
(Poland) Eryk Sztwiertnia

Capps (Carruth, Vengis) (PP) – 04:35	1–0
Yates (Rushby, Clarke) (PP) – 25:05	2–0
	2–1	52:51 – Kovacs (Nechita, Timaru

8 min
Penalties
12 min
32
Shots
39

10 January 2026; 12:30	Great Britain	4–3 OT (1–1, 2–1, 0–1) (OT: 1–0)	China	Berceni Arena, Bucharest; Attendance: 490

Game reference

Benjamin Clark Leech
Goalies
Wen Jiayou
Referees:
(Canada) David Elford
(United Kingdom) Oliver Trusswell
Linesmen:
(Romania) Barna Borsos
(Germany) Jonas Reinold

	0–1	03:48 – Wen (Zhao)
Carruth (Bradley, Yates) – 07:03	1–1
Yates (Lynch, Carruth) – 25:07	2–1
Capps (Clarke, Rimko) (PP) – 33:58	3–1
	3–2	37:01 – Sun (Xu, Geng) (PP)
	3–3	42:28 – Zhao (Jin)
Capps – 61:29	4–3

8 min
Penalties
12 min
43
Shots
20

10 January 2026; 16:00	Croatia	4–2 (0–1, 1–0, 3–1)	Spain	Berceni Arena, Bucharest; Attendance: 570

Game reference

Niksa Slade
Goalies
Albert Bosch
Guillermo Esteban
Referees:
(Ukraine) Oleg Serebriakov
(Latvia) Davis Zunde
Linesmen:
(United States) Thomas Dockery
(Poland) Eryk Sztwiertnia

	0–1	06:52 – Sanz (Pérez, Fernández) (PP)
Gorsić (Zovko) (PP) – 37:54	1–1
Gorsić (Ferencina, Ivanus) – 49:52	2–1
Alić (Ferencina) – 52:04	3–1
	3–2	57:44 – Garkusha (Pérez, González) (PP, EA)
Alić (Zovko) – 58:15	4–2

16 min
Penalties
28 min
36
Shots
30

10 January 2026; 19:30	South Korea	5–2 (2–1, 2–1, 1–0)	Romania	Berceni Arena, Bucharest; Attendance: 795

Game reference

Park Sang-woo
Goalies
Calin Mardale
Referees:
(Sweden) Kristoffer Folkstrand
(Slovakia) Juraj Konc
Linesmen:
(Czech Republic) Frantisek Stepanek
(Norway) Andreas Vyssios

	0–1	07:24 – M. Janos (D. Janos, Lusztig)
Lee J. (Yoo, Lee S.) – 08:38	1–1
Kim B. (Kim Ju.) – 10:44	2–1
	2–2	21:05 – Nagy (Timaru, Mathe) (PP)
Lee G. (Kim B., Kim Ju.) (PP) – 27:12	3–2
Kim Jian (Park J., Jung M.) – 29:31	4–2
Kim Ju. (Kim B., Kim Ji.) (ENG) – 57:34	5–2

20 min
Penalties
16 min
29
Shots
21

=== Statistics ===
==== Top 10 scorers ====
Pos	Player	Country	GP	G	A	Pts	+/–	PIM
1	Kim Jung-jun	South Korea	5	2	13	15	+11	0
2	Roko Goršič	Croatia	5	4	7	11	–1	10
3	Matko Idžan	Croatia	5	6	4	10	–1	4
4	Kim Beom-su	South Korea	5	4	6	10	+8	2
5	Lee Jun-seo	South Korea	5	4	3	7	+6	6
6	Brynley Capps	Great Britain	5	5	1	6	0	6
6	Kim Do-hyun	South Korea	5	5	1	6	+6	10
8	Bailey Yates	Great Britain	5	4	2	6	0	2
9	Kim Jian	South Korea	5	3	3	6	+5	4
9	Kim Kwan-yu	South Korea	5	3	3	6	+6	2
9	Lim Sung-kyu	South Korea	5	3	3	6	+7	16

GP = Games played; G = Goals; A = Assists; Pts = Points; +/− = P Plus–minus; PIM = Penalties In Minutes
Source: IIHF

==== Goaltending leaders ====
(minimum 40% team's total ice time)

Pos	Player	Country	TOI	GA	Sv%	GAA	SO
1	Park Sang-woo	South Korea	260:00	5	93.90	1.15	1
2	Benjamin Clark Leach	Great Britain	301:29	13	90.85	2.59	0
3	Zhang Youyi	China	181:49	9	90.43	2.97	0
4	Guillermo Esteban	Spain	146:59	12	89.83	4.90	0
5	Calin Mardale	Romania	178:27	9	88.89	3.03	0

TOI = Time on ice (minutes:seconds); GA = Goals against; GAA = Goals against average; Sv% = Save percentage; SO = Shutouts
Source: IIHF

==== Best Players Selected by the Directorate ====
- Goaltender: (United Kingdom) Benjamin Clark Leach
- Defenceman: (Croatia) Roko Goršič
- Forward: (South Korea) Kim Jung-jun

Source: IIHF

== Division II B ==
2026 IIHF U20 World Championship Division II B

Tournament details
- Host country: Serbia
- City: Belgrade
- Venue: 1 (in 1 host city)
- Dates: 18–24 January 2026
- Teams: 6

Tournament statistics
- Games played: 15
- Goals scored: 129 (8.6 per game)
- Attendance: 4,455 (297 per game)
- Scoring leader: (Netherlands) Jaidy van Mourik (16 points)

Official website
- www.iihf.com

The Division II B tournament was played in Belgrade, Serbia, from 18 to 24 January 2026.

=== Participating teams ===
Team	Qualification
Netherlands	placed 6th in Division II A last year and were relegated
Israel	placed 2nd in Division II B last year
Serbia (hosts)	placed 3rd in Division II B last year
Australia	placed 4th in Division II B last year
Iceland	placed 5th in Division II B last year
New Zealand	placed 1st in Division III A last year and were promoted

=== Standings ===
Pos	Team	Pld	W	OTW	OTL	L	GF	GA	GD	Pts	Promotion or relegation
1	Netherlands	5	5	0	0	0	40	3	+37	15	Promotion to the 2027 Division II A
2	Australia	5	3	0	0	2	29	21	+8	9	
3	Israel	5	2	1	0	2	20	18	+2	8	
4	Serbia (H)	5	2	0	1	2	14	19	−5	7	
5	New Zealand	5	1	0	0	4	11	44	−33	3 (Note: Head-to-head points: New Zealand 3, Iceland 0)	
6	Iceland	5	1	0	0	4	15	24	−9	3	Relegation to the 2027 Division III A

Source: IIHF
Rules for classification: 1) points; 2) head-to-head points; 3) head-to-head goal difference; 4) head-to-head number of goals scored; 5) result against closest best-ranked team outside tied teams; 6) result against next best-ranked team outside tied teams; 7) seeding before tournament.
(H) Host

=== Results ===
All times are local, CET (UTC+1).

18 January 2026; 12:30	New Zealand	1–13 (0–4, 1–6, 0–3)	Australia	Pionir Ice Hall, Belgrade; Attendance: 42

Game reference

Caleb Price
Jake Thompson
Goalies
Justin Baxter
Referee:
(Italy) Andrea Moschen
Linesmen:
(Iceland) Oli Gunnarsson
(Serbia) Matija Nikolic

	0–1	01:09 – Kuleshov
	0–2	02:16 – Suchler (Gilchrist)
	0–3	03:33 – Colev (Koudelka, Astafiev)
	0–4	15:25 – Colev (Harrow, Ouimette)
	0–5	26:46 – Lake
Bary (MacDonald, Wimmer) – 32:32	1–5
	1–6	34:32 – Garas (Hodges, Loria)
	1–7	35:50 – Colev (Reader, Oxlade)
	1–8	37:22 – Trnka (Koudelka, Ouimette)
	1–9	39:10 – Kuleshov
	1–10	39:28 – Shumak (Garas, Koudelka)
	1–11	49:30 – Suchler (Ouimette, Loria)
	1–12	56:13 – Mollee (Reader, Garas)
	1–13	58:33 – Kuleshov (Shearer, Koudelka)

0 min
Penalties
2 min
15
Shots
50

18 January 2026; 16:00	Israel	5–4 (3–2, 1–1, 1–1)	Iceland	Pionir Ice Hall, Belgrade; Attendance: 39

Game reference

Michael Kozlov
Goalies
Elias Runarsson
Referee:
(France) Leevan Thiebault
Linesmen:
(South Korea) Jungoh Chae
(Slovakia) Jozef Tichy

	0–1	00:52 – Hrolfsson (Kristjansson, Mojzyszek)
Vizelman (Revniaga) – 10:36	1–1
Zitserman (Vasilev) (PP) – 14:54	2–1
Melnikov (Kerner, Elkin) – 15:18	3–1
	3–2	18:59 – Mojzyszek (Hrolfsson)
	3–3	21:21 – Mojzyszek (Kristjansson, Sigurolason)
Zitserman (Kazinets) (PP) – 27:31	4–3
Kerner (Melnikov, Elkin) – 49:04	5–3
	5–4	49:57 – Bjorgvinsson (Ingason)

10 min
Penalties
10 min
31
Shots
21

18 January 2026; 19:30	Serbia	0–5 (0–1, 0–3, 0–1)	Netherlands	Pionir Ice Hall, Belgrade; Attendance: 724

Game reference

Filip Korenić
Goalies
Danylo Douma
Referee:
(Norway) Torjus Brynildsen
Linesmen:
(United Kingdom) Eathan Arnold
(Switzerland) Gian Muggli

0–1	15:07 – Wendijk (van Mourik, Geheniau)
0–2	21:07 – Noblesse (Wendijk, van Mourik)
0–3	23:51 – van Mourik (Muizer) (PP)
0–4	28:59 – Versantvoort (Raijmakers, de Zwart) (PP)
0–5	50:17 – Wilkes (Cornelder, Topfer)

10 min
Penalties
2 min
15
Shots
35

19 January 2026; 12:30	Iceland	2–6 (1–3, 0–1, 1–2)	New Zealand	Pionir Ice Hall, Belgrade; Attendance: 28

Game reference

Elias Runarsson
Goalies
Caleb Price
Referee:
(Slovenia) Jan Leben
Linesmen:
(Switzerland) Gian Muggli
(Serbia) Matija Nikolic

	0–1	02:30 – Gallagher (Byfield)
	0–2	03:48 – Gallagher (Paterson) (PP)
Kristjansson (Mojzyszek) – 12:20	1–2
	1–3	16:47 – Middleton (Campbell)
	1–4	35:23 – Koptev (PP)
	1–5	45:38 – Rout (Ruski-Jones, Wimmer) (PP)
Ingason (Eiriksson) – 50:19	2–5
	2–6	59:34 – Bary (Boniface, Middleton) (PP2)

16 min
Penalties
6 min
27
Shots
28

19 January 2026; 16:00	Netherlands	8–1 (1–0, 3–1, 4–0)	Australia	Pionir Ice Hall, Belgrade; Attendance: 53

Game reference

Thijs Kivits
Goalies
Thomas Papas
Referee:
(France) Leevan Thiebault
Linesmen:
(South Korea) Jungoh Chae
(Iceland) Oli Gunnarsson

Wendijk – 00:49	1–0
van Mourik (Wendijk, Noblesse)– 24:15	2–0
van Brunshott (Wendijk, Noblesse) – 27:14	3–0
Versantvoort (van Belkom, Andringa) – 28:46	4–0
	4–1	39:36 – Harrow
Cornelder (Topfer) – 42:03	5–1
van Belkom (Flippini, Geheniau) – 44:09	6–1
Wilkes (de Zwart) – 46:12	7–1
Wilkes (de Zwart,van Brunschott) – 50:14	8–1

2 min
Penalties
6 min
40
Shots
23

19 January 2026; 19:30	Israel	3–2 OT (0–1, 0–1, 2–0) (OT: 1–0)	Serbia	Pionir Ice Hall, Belgrade; Attendance: 637

Game reference

Michael Kozlov
Goalies
Filip Korenić
Referee:
(Italy) Andrea Moschen
Linesmen:
(United Kingdom) Eathan Arnold
(Slovakia) Jozef Tichy

	0–1	08:56 – Agić (Matović, Temunović)
	0–2	39:16 – Breastvić (Martinović)
Zitserman (Kazinets, Kerner) (PP) – 54:51	1–2
Kazinets (Zitserman, Kerner) (PP) – 57:46	2–2
Zitserman (Kazinets, Vasilev) (PP) – 61:09	3–2

10 min
Penalties
30 min
42
Shots
24

21 January 2026; 12:30	Netherlands	5–0 (2–0, 1–0, 2–0)	Iceland	Pionir Ice Hall, Belgrade; Attendance: 43

Game reference

Danylo Douma
Goalies
Elvar Sigurdarson
Referee:
(France) Leevan Thiebault
Linesmen:
(South Korea) Jungoh Chae
(Serbia) Matija Nikolic

Versantvoort (Noblesse, van Belkom)– 03:16	1–0
Wendijk (van Mourik, Flippini) – 07:54	2–0
van Mourik (Wendijk, Noblesse) – 21:48	3–0
Noblesse (van Brunshott, van Mourik) – 41:52	4–0
van Belkom (Andringa, Versantvoort) – 54:07	5–0

4 min
Penalties
2 min
48
Shots
25

21 January 2026; 16:00	Israel	9–1 (2–0, 5–0, 2–1)	New Zealand	Pionir Ice Hall, Belgrade; Attendance: 37

Game reference

Michael Kozlov
Ben Rahman
Goalies
Caleb Price
Jake Thompson
Referee:
(Norway) Torjus Brynildsen
Linesmen:
(United Kingdom) Eathan Arnold
(Kazakhstan) Timur Iskakov

Zitserman – 03:52	1–0
Kerner (Charniak, Melnikov) – 19:26	2–0
Elkin (Charniak, Melnikov) (PP) – 26:54	3–0
Zitserman (Vasilev, Goldshtein) – 28:19	4–0
Vizelman (Kerner, Ougortsin) – 29:42	5–0
Graves (Mueller, Kaplan) – 32:57	6–0
Vasilev (Goldshtein, Zitserman) – 39:59	7–0
Kazinets (Vasilev, Goldshtein) (PP) – 45:53	8–0
	8–1	56:39 – Clamor (Paterson)
Zitserman (Vasilev, Goldshtein) – 57:42	9–1

4 min
Penalties
8 min
42
Shots
24

21 January 2026; 19:30	Serbia	6–4 (2–1, 2–1, 2–2)	Australia	Pionir Ice Hall, Belgrade; Attendance: 687

Game reference

Filip Korenić
Goalies
Thomas Papas
Referee:
(Slovenia) Jan Leben
Linesmen:
(Switzerland) Gian Muggli
(Slovakia) Jozef Tichy

	0–1	05:32 – Harrow (Shearer)
Pecerić (Šaranović, Dimitrić) – 12:09	1–1
Pecerić (Milovanović, Milikić) – 18:03	2–1
Temunović (Matić, Šaranović) – 23:58	3–1
	3–2	30:36 – Kuleshov (Suchler, Ouimette)
Martinović (Temunović, Banzić) (PP) – 38:56	4–2
Vujović (Dimitrić) – 51:14	5–2
	5–3	56:17 – Lake (Kuleshov, Ouimette)
Martinovic – 56:43	6–3
	6–4	58:29 – Reader (Oxlade, Harrow)

8 min
Penalties
12 min
27
Shots
31

22 January 2026; 12:30	New Zealand	0–16 (0–4, 0–8, 0–4)	Netherlands	Pionir Ice Hall, Belgrade; Attendance: 36

Game reference

Jake Thompson
Caleb Price
Goalies
Thijs Kivits
Referee:
(Italy) Andrea Moschen
Linesmen:
(Iceland) Oli Gunnarsson
(Kazakhstan) Timur Iskakov

0–1	06:24 – de Zwart (Noblesse, Raijmakers)
0–2	10:16 – Raijmakers (Muizer, Noblesse)
0–3	11:57 – Geheniau (Noblesse, Flippini)
0–4	15:12 – Flippini (Cornelder, van den Thillart)
0–5	22:42 – Andringa (van Mourik, van Belkom) (PP)
0–6	24:14 – Raijmakers (van Mourik, Topfer)
0–7	26:02 – Andringa (Versantvoort, van den Thillart)
0–8	28:47 – van Belkom (van Mourik, Muizer) (PP)
0–9	31:02 – van Mourik
0–10	35:25 – van Mourik (van Belkom, van Brunshott)
0–11	36:00 – van Mourik (Raijmakers, Flippini)
0–12	39:27 – Versantvoort (van Belkom, Andringa)
0–13	43:18 – Wilkes (Cornelder, van den Thillart)
0–14	44:27 – Topfer (Noblesse, de Graaf)
0–15	49:22 – Raijmakers (Noblesse, de Graaf)
0–16	51:20 – Muizer (Noblesse)

6 min
Penalties
2 min
16
Shots
63

22 January 2026; 16:00	Australia	5–1 (1–0, 2–0, 2–1)	Israel	Pionir Ice Hall, Belgrade; Attendance: 42

Game reference

Thomas Papas
Goalies
Michael Kozlov
Referee:
(Slovenia) Jan Leben
Linesmen:
(United Kingdom) Eathan Arnold
(Serbia) Matija Nikolic

Jerome (Kuleshov, Koudelka) (PP) – 15:49	1–0
Lake (Kuleshov, Koudelka) (PP) – 22:06	2–0
Colev (Hodges, Garas) – 36:09	3–0
Harrow (Jerome) – 48:16	4–0
	4–1	50:58 – Graves (Melnikov, Mueller)
Hodges (Reader, Harrow) (PP) – 54:40	5–1

12 min
Penalties
41 min
35
Shots
42

22 January 2026; 19:30	Iceland	4–2 (0–1, 1–0, 3–1)	Serbia	Pionir Ice Hall, Belgrade; Attendance: 872

Game reference

Elvar Sigurdarson
Goalies
Filip Korenić
Referee:
(Norway) Torjus Brynildsen
Linesmen:
(South Korea) Jung-Oh Chae
(Switzerland) Gian Muggli

	0–1	15:28 – Pecerić (Banzić, Temunović) (PP)
Karvelsson (Johannsson, Westin) – 28:37	1–1
Hrolfsson (Karvelsson, Waage) – 41:17	2–1
Egilsson (Bjarnason, Hrolfsson) – 48:39	3–1
	3–2	57:21 – Pecerić (Matović, Martinović) (PP, EA)
Ingason (Mojzyszek) (ENG) – 59:43	4–2

4 min
Penalties
4 min
22
Shots
32

24 January 2026; 12:30	Australia	6–5 (0–2, 0–1, 6–2)	Iceland	Pionir Ice Hall, Belgrade; Attendance: 47

Game reference

Thomas Papas
Goalies
Elvar Sigurdarson
Referee:
(France) Leevan Thiebault
Linesmen:
(United Kingdom) Eathan Arnold
(Serbia) Matija Nikolic

	0–1	01:57 – Garcia (Bjarnason)
	0–2	09:51 – Johannsson (Egilsson, Garcia)
	0–3	39:36 – Bjorgvinsson (Mojzyszek) (SH)
Lake (Koudelka, Kuleshov) (PP) – 40:22	1–3
Lake (Kuleshov, Jerome) (PP) – 42:56	2–3
	2–4	43:13 – Gudnason (Bjorgvinsson, Steinsen)
	2–5	43:55 – Waage (Karvelsson, Hrolfsson)
Astafiev – 47:07	3–5
Astafiev (Gilchrist, Garas) – 49:40	4–5
Suchler (Jerome, Kuleshov) (PP) – 52:48	5–5
Garas (Ouimette, Lake) – 53:31	6–5

6 min
Penalties
8 min
42
Shots
27

24 January 2026; 16:00	Netherlands	6–2 (4–0, 0–1, 2–1)	Israel	Pionir Ice Hall, Belgrade; Attendance: 51

Game reference

Danylo Douma
Goalies
Michael Kozlov
Referee:
(Norway) Torjus Brynildsen
Linesmen:
(Kazakhstan) Timur Iskakov
(Slovakia) Jozef Tichy

Andringa (Muizer, Versantvoort)– 00:44	1–0
van Mourik – 12:11	2–0
Noblesse (van Belkom, van Mourik) (PP) – 17:10	3–0
Andringa (van Belkom, Keulen) – 18:46	4–0
	4–1	23:20 – Vizelman (Revniaga)
Andringa (van Belkom, Topfer) – 51:42	5–1
	5–2	52:12 – Elkin (Rendell, Vizelman)
Noblesse (van Mourik, Raijmakers) – 55:43	6–2

4 min
Penalties
8 min
54
Shots
29

24 January 2026; 19:30	Serbia	4–3 (0–1, 1–1, 3–1)	New Zealand	Pionir Ice Hall, Belgrade; Attendance: 1,117

Game reference

Filip Korenić
Goalies
Caleb Price
Referee:
(Slovenia) Jan Leben
Linesmen:
(Iceland) Oli Gunnarsson
(Switzerland) Gian Muggli

	0–1	03:44 – MacDonald
	0–2	27:30 – MacDonald (Rout, Paterson) (PP)
Temunović (Vujović, Damnjanović) – 28:12	1–2
Matić (Jovičić) – 42:29	2–2
Banzić (Vujović, Matović) – 47:34	3–2
Brestovac (Martinović, Banzić) – 57:23	4–2
	4–3	58:42 – Ruski-Jones (EA)

35 min
Penalties
2 min
55
Shots
22

=== Statistics ===
==== Top 10 scorers ====
Pos	Player	Country	GP	G	A	Pts	+/–	PIM
1	Jaidy van Mourik	Netherlands	5	7	9	16	+15	2
2	Donny van Belkom	Netherlands	5	3	8	11	+9	0
3	Ivan Kuleshov	Australia	5	3	7	10	–4	0
4	Nikita Zitserman	Israel	5	7	2	9	–4	10
5	Jelle Noblesse	Netherlands	5	4	5	9	+14	0
6	Stijn Andringa	Netherlands	5	5	3	8	+8	0
7	Jan Versantvoort	Netherlands	5	4	3	7	+6	0
8	Bryan Wendijk	Netherlands	3	3	4	7	+7	2
9	Koen Raijmakers	Netherlands	5	3	4	7	+9	0
10	Daniel Koudelka	Australia	5	0	7	7	0	2

GP = Games played; G = Goals; A = Assists; Pts = Points; +/− = P Plus–minus; PIM = Penalties In Minutes
Source: IIHF

==== Goaltending leaders ====
(minimum 40% team's total ice time)

Pos	Player	Country	TOI	GA	Sv%	GAA	SO
1	Thijs Kivits	Netherlands	120:00	1	97.44	0.50	1
2	Danylo Douma	Netherlands	180:00	2	97.10	0.67	2
3	Michael Kozlov	Israel	291:23	17	89.03	3.50	0
4	Elvar Sigurdarson	Iceland	200:44	15	88.81	4.48	0
5	Filip Korenič	Serbia	298:04	18	88.08	3.62	0

TOI = Time on ice (minutes:seconds); GA = Goals against; GAA = Goals against average; Sv% = Save percentage; SO = Shutouts
Source: IIHF

==== Best Players Selected by the Directorate ====
- Goaltender: (Netherlands) Danylo Douma
- Defenceman: (Australia) Daniel Koudelka
- Forward: (Netherlands) Jaidy van Mourik

Source: IIHF
