= Team Canada New Year's Eve game =

Annual junior ice hockey game

The World Junior Hockey Championship is played every year from December 26 to January 5, and is a major event on the sporting calendar for many Canadians. In almost every year Canada plays their final round-robin game on New Year's Eve. It is broadcast annually by TSN (English) and RDS (French), attracting large audiences. If in the same group, the United States is usually Canada's opponent. If the tournament doesn't schedule games on New Year's Eve, such as in 2002 and 2005, Canada would play on December 30 instead. In 2018, Canada's last round-robin game was also December 30; however, the marquee matchup against the United States was held the afternoon of December 29 on the outdoor surface of New Era Field.

== List of games ==
Tournament	Date	Time (EST)	Venue	Host city	Team 1	Score	Team 2	Attendance	Game reference
2000	Friday, Dec 31, 1999	10:00am	Skellefteå Kraft Arena	Skellefteå, Sweden	Canada	1−1	United States	596	Game reference
2001	Sunday, Dec 31, 2000	9:00am	Vityaz Ice Palace	Podolsk, Russia	Canada	8−4	Switzerland	1,300	Game reference
2002	Monday, Dec 30, 2001	1:00pm	Hradec Králové	Hradec Králové, Czech Republic	Canada	1−4	Finland	3,500	Game reference
2003	Tuesday, Dec 31, 2002	7:00pm	Halifax Metro Centre	Halifax, Nova Scotia, Canada	Canada	5−3	Finland	10,594	Game reference
2004	Wednesday, Dec 31, 2003	9:00am	Helsinki Ice Hall	Helsinki, Finland	Canada	5−2	Czech Republic	2,816	Game reference
2005	Thursday, Dec. 30, 2004	4:30pm	Ralph Engelstad Arena	Grand Forks, North Dakota, United States	Canada	8−1	Finland	9,697	Game reference
2006	Saturday, Dec 31, 2005	7:00pm	Pacific Coliseum	Vancouver, British Columbia, Canada	Canada	3−2	United States	16,083	Game reference
2007	Sunday, Dec 31, 2006	7:00am	Ejendals Arena	Leksand, Sweden	Canada	3−0	Slovakia	1,434	Game reference
2008	Monday, Dec 31, 2007	12:00pm	ČEZ Aréna	Pardubice, Czech Republic	Canada	4−1	Denmark	1,158	Game reference
2009	Wednesday, Dec 31, 2008	7:30pm	Scotiabank Place	Ottawa, Ontario, Canada	Canada	7−4	United States	20,223	Game reference
2010	Thursday, Dec 31, 2009	8:00pm	Credit Union Centre	Saskatoon, Saskatchewan, Canada	Canada	5−4 SO	United States	15,171	Game reference
2011	Friday, Dec 31, 2010	4:00pm	HSBC Arena	Buffalo, New York, United States	Canada	5−6 SO	Sweden	17,761	Game reference
2012	Saturday, Dec 31, 2011	8:00pm	Rexall Place	Edmonton, Alberta, Canada	Canada	3−2	United States	16,647	Game reference
2013	Monday, Dec 31, 2012	9:00am	Ufa Arena	Ufa, Russia	Canada	4−1	Russia	7,988	Game reference
2014	Tuesday, Dec 31, 2013	11:30am	Malmö Isstadion	Malmö, Sweden	Canada	3−2	United States	3,882	Game reference
2015	Wednesday, Dec 31, 2014	4:00pm	Bell Centre	Montreal, Quebec, Canada	Canada	5−3	United States	18,295	Game reference
2016	Thursday, Dec 31, 2015	1:00pm	Helsinki Ice Hall	Helsinki, Finland	Canada	2−5	Sweden	7,003	Game reference
2017	Saturday, Dec 31, 2016	3:30pm	Air Canada Centre	Toronto, Ontario, Canada	Canada	1−3	United States	18,584	Game reference
2018	Saturday, Dec 30, 2017	8:00pm	KeyBank Center	Buffalo, New York, United States	Canada	8−0	Denmark	8,671	Game reference
2019	Monday, Dec 31, 2018	8:00pm	Rogers Arena	Vancouver, British Columbia, Canada	Canada	1−2	Russia	17,556	Game reference
2020	Tuesday, Dec 31, 2019	1:00pm	Ostravar Aréna	Ostrava, Czech Republic	Canada	7−2	Czech Republic	8,693	Game reference
2021	Thursday, Dec 31, 2020	6:00pm	Rogers Place	Edmonton, Alberta, Canada	Canada	4−1	Finland	0 (Note: The game was played behind closed doors due to the COVID-19 pandemic.)	Game reference
2022	Friday, Dec 31, 2021	7:00pm	Rogers Place	Edmonton, Alberta, Canada	Canada	Cancelled	Finland		
2023	Saturday, Dec 31, 2022	6:30pm	Scotiabank Centre	Halifax, Nova Scotia, Canada	Canada	5−1	Sweden	10,301	Game reference
2024	Sunday, Dec 31, 2023	1:30pm	Scandinavium	Gothenburg, Sweden	Canada	6−3	Germany	7,327	Game reference
2025	Tuesday, Dec 31, 2024	8:00pm	Canadian Tire Centre	Ottawa, Ontario, Canada	Canada	1−4	United States	18,935	Game reference
2026	Wednesday, Dec 31, 2025	8:30pm	3M Arena at Mariucci	Minneapolis, Minnesota, United States	Canada	7–4	Finland	7,582	Game reference
2027	Thursday, Dec 31, 2026	6:00pm	Rogers Place	Edmonton, Alberta, Canada	Canada		Czechia		
