= Russian Ice Hockey Federation (RIHF) v International Ice Hockey Federation (IIHF) =

Decision of the Court of Arbitration of Sport

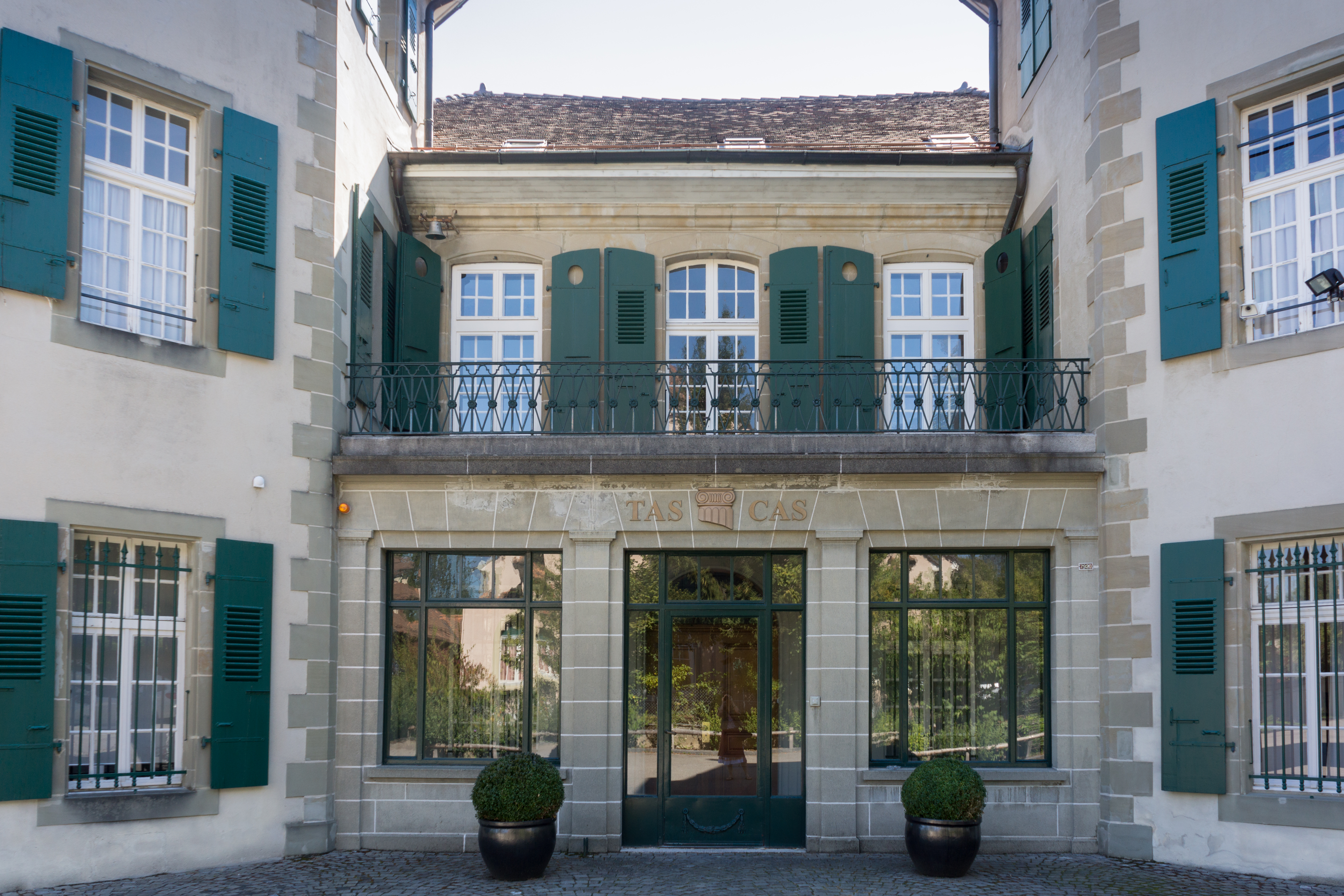
- Lausanne headquarters for the CAS
- Court: Court of Arbitration for Sport; Tribunal arbitral du sport; Tribunal arbitral del deporte
- Decided: 30 October 2026
- Citation: CAS/A/12753

Case history
- Subsequent action: Challenge to CAS decision based on alleged undisclosed links to Russia
- Related actions: Russian Curling Federation v World Curling, CAS 2026/A/12777 and CAS 2026/A/12173

Court membership
- Judges sitting: Giulio Palermo, President (Italy); Ismail Selim, Member (Egypt); Mark Hovell, Member (UK)

Case opinions
- IIHF had not demonstrated sufficient reason to bar Russian teams from international hockey competition; IIHF ordered to re-admit Russian teams to tournaments
- Decision by: Panel; reasons to follow

Russian Ice Hockey Federation (RIHF) v International Ice Hockey Federation (IIHF) is a decision of the Court of Arbitration for Sport, concerning Russian participation in international ice hockey tournaments. The CAS is an international arbitration body, set up originally by the International Olympic Committee and now under the authority of the International Council of Arbitration for Sport.

Following Russia's invasion of Ukraine in 2022, the International Ice Hockey Federation (IIHF) barred any Russian teams from participating in international ice hockey tournaments. The Russian Ice Hockey Federation (RIHF) brought a complaint to the CAS, seeking to have the bar on participation set aside. On 30 October 2026, the CAS issued an arbitration decision on the complaint.

It held that the IIHF had not provided sufficient reasons in support of the bar on Russian participation, and ordered that Russia be re-admitted to the international ice hockey competitions.

The decision generated considerable controversy. The first ice hockey competition to which the decision applied is the 2027 World Junior Ice Hockey Championships, which will be held in Edmonton and Red Deer in Canada from 26 December 2026 to 7 January 2027. Several of the teams which will be competing in the tournament have announced that they will boycott any matches with a Russian team. Similar issues have arisen with the men's 2027 IIHF World Championship, set to be held in Düsseldorf, Gelsenkirchen, and Mannheim, Germany in May 2027.

On 3 November 2026, the prime minister of Canada, Mark Carney, announced that Canada will not issue visas to any Russian players or team officials, effectively barring them from participating in the tournament. On 15 November, the IIHF announced that the World Junior tournament would go ahead in Canada as planned, without the Russian team playing.

The president of the RIHF, Vladislav Tretiak, has strongly criticised the reaction to the CAS decision. He has stated that Russia will seek compensation if barred from competing, and had suggested that the World's Junior Championship should be relocated to another country if the Canadian government does not allow the Russian team to enter Canada. He also stated that the RIHF would ask the CAS to consider ethics complaints against any team that boycotted matches with a Russian team.

== Background ==
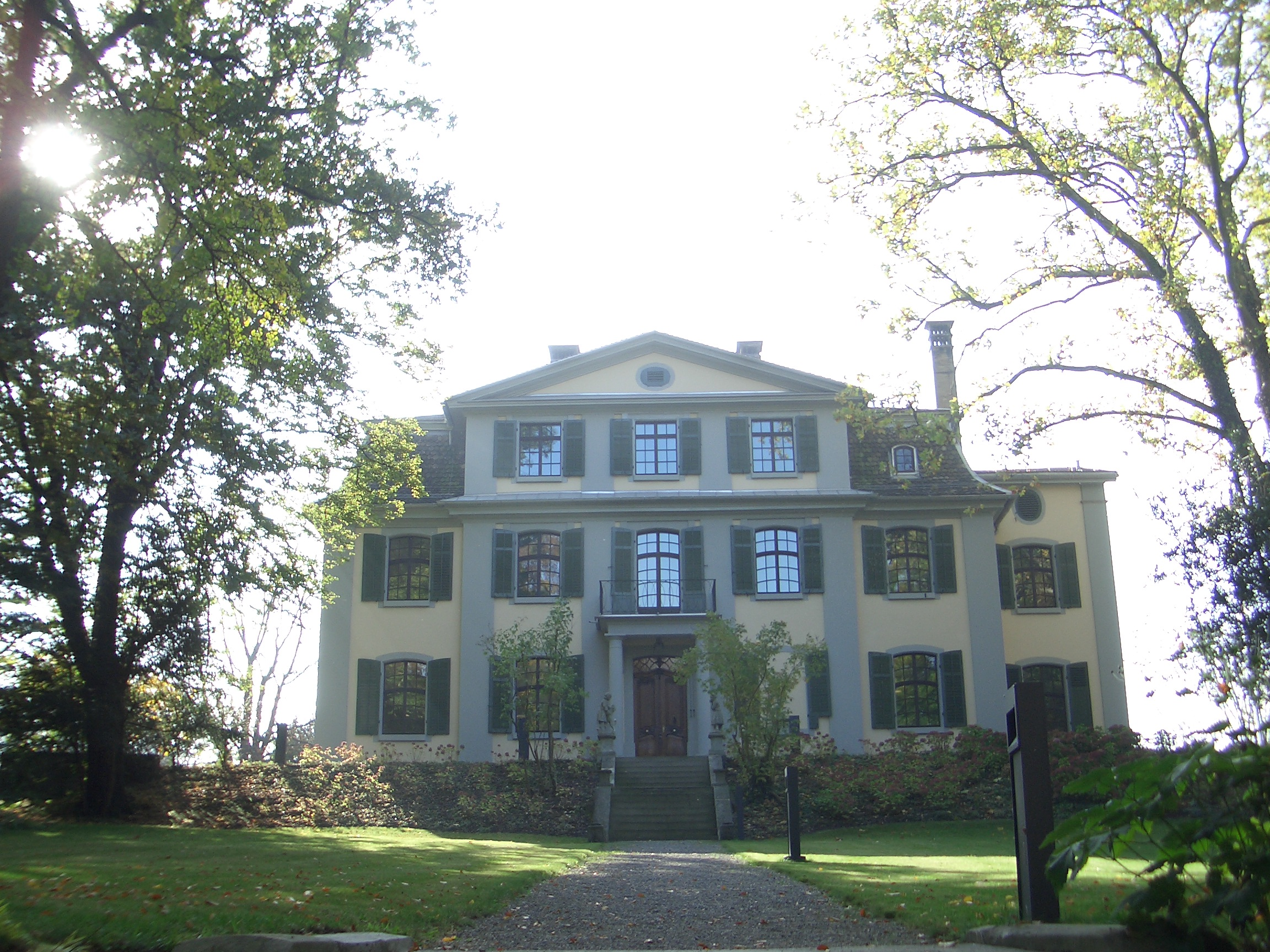
Headquarters of the International Ice Hockey Federation, Zurich, Switzerland

The International Ice Hockey Federation is the international governing body for ice hockey. One of its activities is organizing international ice hockey tournaments. The IIHF awards hosting rights for the tournaments and sets the rules, including deciding which nations will be represented in the tournaments and their ranking going into a tournament.

In 2022, Russia invaded Ukraine with the goal of annexing the entire country to Russia. The invasion intensified the Russo-Ukraine war. Western countries in Europe and North America condemned the Russian invasion. They responded by a variety of measures, including economic sanctions against Russia.

"The IIHF is not a political entity and cannot influence the decisions being taken over the war in Ukraine. We nevertheless have a duty of care to all of our members and participants and must therefore do all we can to ensure that we are able to operate our events in a safe environment for all teams taking part in the IIHF World Championship program."

— IIHF President Luc Tardif, Statement by IIHF Council, 28 February 2022

The IIHF responded to the Russian invasion by banning Russia and Belarus from participating in any international hockey tournaments. That ban was of indefinite duration. It also cancelled Russia's hosting of the 2023 World Junior Ice Hockey Championships. The Council stated that it took these measures primarily to protect the health and well-being of all participating players, officials, and fans, including concerns over the safe movement of participants and fans in Russia during the war.

In 2022, Russia and Belarus appealed the decision to the IIHF's independent Disciplinary Board, arguing that it was discriminatory. The board dismissed the appeal, concluding that the measure was a safety policy which the IIHF had the right to implement. Russia and Belarus did not seek any review of that 2022 decision.

The 2023 World Juniors tournament had been set to be held in Novosibirsk and Omsk in Russia from 26 December 2022 to 5 January 2023. After the withdrawal of Russia’s hosting rights, the tournament was held in Canada instead.

== CAS decision ==
=== IIHF case ===
The Russian Ice Hockey Federation (RIHF), also called the Hockey Federation of Russia, is an all-Russia public association responsible for developing and organizing hockey in Russia, including Russian participation in international hockey events. In 2026, it lodged three separate complaints against the IIHF concerning the bar on Russian participation in international hockey competitions and also from attending an IIHF congress. On 30 October 2026, the CAS allowed one of those complaints and ordered that the IIHF re-admit Russia to international competitions, beginning with the World Junior Championship which will be held in Canada from 26 December 2026 to 5 January 2027.

The CAS panel was composed of three individuals: Giulio Palermo (Italy) who was the president of the panel, and Ismail Selim (Egypt) and Mark Hovell (UK) as members. In its decision, the panel noted that Russia had again filed an appeal to the IIHF's own independent Discipinary Board, this time in 2026. The IIHF had cited the safety and security concerns which motivated its decision. In May 2026, the IIHF Disciplinary Board had concluded that those concerns were not sufficient to warrant the exclusion, and referred the matter back to the IIHF for re-consideration. The IIHF then confirmed its earlier position, upon which the RIHF appealed to the CAS.

The CAS panel concluded that under the IIHF's own regulations, only substantial security concerns could outweigh the right of athletes of a particular nationality to compete. Since the security concerns in this case did not meet that standard, the panel allowed the appeal, ordering the IIHF to allow Russian participation in an number of upcoming events:

- World Junior Championship, Canada, 26 December 2026 – 5 January 2027
- U18 Women’s World Championship, Czech Republic, 8 – 16 January 2027
- U18 Men’s World Championship, USA, 22 April – 2 May 2027
- Men’s World Championship, Germany, 14 – 30 May 2027
- Women’s World Championship, Canada, November 2027

The panel noted that the media release on 30 October was operational, and a full set of reasons would follow at a later date.

=== World Curling case ===
In the same media release, the CAS panel considered two appeals by the Russian Curling Federation and Russian curlers, concerning a similar ban on Russian participation by World Curling. In that case, World Curling submitted that the participation of Russian teams would not be consistent with the integrity of the curling championships, because of concerns about players refusing to compete with Russian players, other countries refusing to host competitions with Russian teams, and visa refusals by host countries. The CAS panel concluded that World Curling had demonstrated that the exclusion was related to the well-functioning of their competitions, and dismissed the Russian appeal.

=== Summary of other cases ===
The media release concluded with a summary of CAS decisions relating to Russian participation in a number of other sports.

== Reaction to the decision ==
=== IIHF and national hockey federations ===
The IIHF immediately issued a statement on 30 October 2026, stating that it was disappointed with the decision but would comply with it. The IIHF stated that it continued to believe that the safety and security concerns it had raised were valid and supported the exclusion of Russia. The IIHF stated it was in communication with the various national hockey associations, organizing committees and host authorities. Implementing the ruling would require a review of competition formats, schedules, travel and accommodation arrangements, and safety and security measures. The IIHF stated that the CAS panel did not appear to have considered the practical difficulties posed by its order.

Several of the countries which are slated to play in IIHF tournaments announced that even if Russia is allowed back in, they will not play matches against Russia. The boycott began with an announcement by Finland, followed by announcements by Latvia, Sweden, the Czech Republic, Norway, and Denmark. Austria said it was considering joining the boycott.

On 3 November 2026 Andrii Sybiha, the Ukrainian foreign minister, made a post on the internet, thanking those nations which announced a boycott. He urged other major hockey countries, such as Canada, to join the boycott. He added: "If CAS lacks a moral compass, let's show that hockey still has values. Refuse to play against Russia and deny visas to its players."

=== Further statement by CAS ===
On 5 November 2026, the CAS issued another media release, in which it stated that its function was to arbitrate the dispute put to it by the parties, the RIHF and the IIHF. It stated that the IIHF had not produced sufficient evidence to support its position on security concerns, and had not raised the organisational consequences which now were at the centre of the public debate. It stated that the CAS could not give remedies that a party had not asked for.

=== Impact on World Junior competition ===
Prime Minister Mark Carney announced Canada would not allow Russian players to compete in the 2027 Word Juniors tournament.

Premier Danielle Smith of Alberta supported the federal announcement.

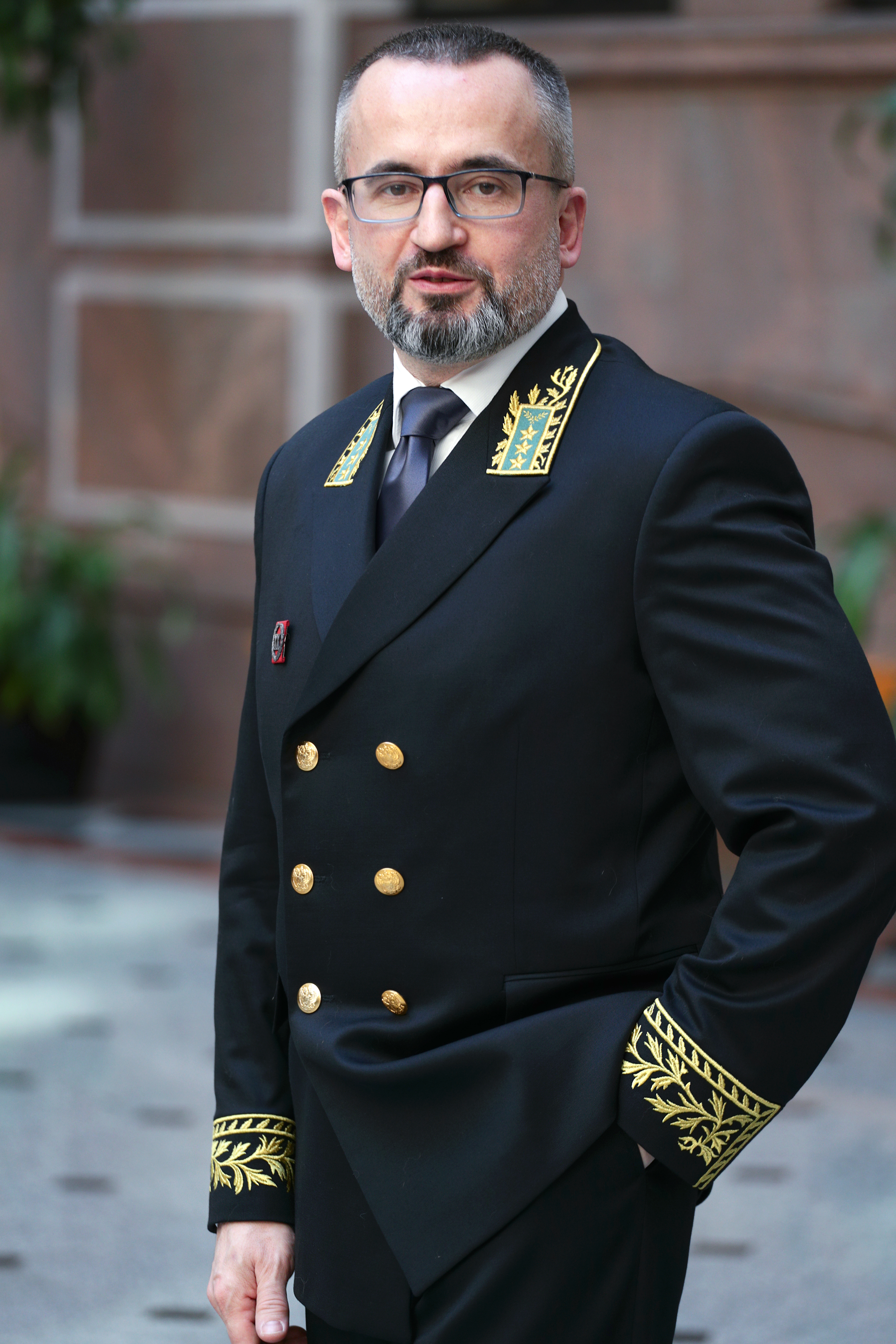
Russian Ambassador Oleg Stepanov criticised the federal decision as contrary to good sportsmanship.

The decision had an immediate impact in Canada, where the World Junior Hockey Championship was set to be held less than two months after the CAS decision, starting on 26 December 2026. Hockey Canada, the national governing body for ice hockey in Canada, stated that it was disappointed with the decision and would be in contact with the IIHF for guidance on the implications of the ruling. The decision raised logistical issues for the tournament organizers, since only ten teams play in the tournament's top tier, and adding Russia to that tier would affect the schedule.

The IIHF's statement had also referred to the logistical difficulties caused by the order for reinstatement, for a tournament less than two months away. It stated that the practical elements raised by the CAS decision cannot be implemented immediately.

Canadian governments also objected to the decision. On the day of the decision, Danielle Smith, the premier of Alberta where the tournament will be held, stated that she was disappointed with the ruling, but the tournament would go ahead in compliance with the ruling.

The federal government condemned the CAS decision. Foreign Affairs Minister Anita Anand and Secretary of Sport Adam van Koeverden both expressed disappointment at the ruling. Van Koeverden stated: "Canada maintains, as it has since 2022, that Russia should not be represented in international sport competitions while Russia's illegal and unjustifiable full-scale invasion against Ukraine continues". Anand stated that the federal government was reviewing further options in response to the ruling.

On 3 November 2026, Prime Minister Mark Carney announced that the federal government would not allow players from Russia to compete in Canada for a national Russian team. The government would use its immigration control power to screen out Russian players and prevent them from playing in the World Junior tournament. He stated: "So if you're asking specifically about the world juniors, the Russians will not be there."

In response, Premier Smith posted her support for the federal decision. She stated: "The people of Ukraine have suffered immeasurably from Vladimir Putin's illegal war. Alberta is now home to 70,000 Ukrainian evacuees who remain unable to return home because of Russia's invasion of their country. We in Alberta stand with them."

Hockey Canada also welcomed Carney's statement, saying that Russian and Belorussian players should not be allowed to compete in Canada under their national symbols. Hockey Canada's board of directors would meet shortly to determine the next steps for the tournament, in light of the clear direction from the federal government.

Russia's ambassador to Canada, Oleg Stepanov, criticised the decision, stating that it injected politics into sport, which should simply be about free competition between young people. He also suggested that the federal government's motive was to give Canada an advantage in the tournament by eliminating its strongest competition, not allowing them to step onto the ice: "A splendid strategy, perhaps, for securing a trophy. A rather less splendid one for preserving the spirit of sport."

The Canadian Secretary of State for Sport, van Koeverden, dismissed concerns that there could be adverse consequences for Canada for the decision. Dick Pound, a member of the IOC and a former arbitrator for the CAS, also was dismissive. He stated that the CAS has no authority to tell the Canadian government whom to admit to Canada: "Short of stamping their feet and pouting, there's not much they can actually do", he said.

On 8 November 2026, the Norwegian hockey federation announced that it had been told by the IIHF that it had been removed from the top tier of the competition to make room for Russia, since Norway had been the last ranked team in the qualifying round. The Norwegian federation stated that it was hopeful that was not the last word, in light of the announcement by Carney.

On 15 November 2026, the IIHF issued a statement advising that in light of the decision by the Canadian government, the Russian team was unable to participate in the World Junior tournament. After considering options, the IIHF decided that the World Junior tournament would go ahead in Canada as planned, without Russian participation.

=== Impact on Men’s World Championship ===
The CAS decision is also having an impact on the 2027 Men's Ice Hockey World Championships, which is set to be held in Germany from 14 May to 30 May 2026, at Düsseldorf, Gelsenkirchen, and Mannheim. There is uncertainty what effect the CAS ruling will have on that tournament.

On 1 November 2026, reports surfaced that the German ice hockey federation was considering whether it would be possible to go ahead with hosting the tournament, or whether it should surrender the hosting rights. The German government stated that it was considering whether to deny visas to Russian hockey players. A later news story on 10 November 2026 indicated that the hockey federation was going to go ahead with the tournament, but a subsequent story on 13 November 2026 cited a statement by a spokesperson for the German government, who said that hosting the tournament was "effectively impossible". However, the German government is not considering denying visas.

One issue which the German tournament organizers are facing is the possibility of boycotts by national hockey teams in the tournament. The current men's world champions, Finland, was the first to declare that they would not play Russian teams in any tournament. Since that announcement, Sweden, Norway, Denmark and the Czech Republic have confirmed that they will not play Russians. Latvia and Austria have made similar statements.

An additional complication is the effect that the CAS decision is having on sponsorship for the tournament. The main sponsor for the tournament, Škoda Auto, has stated that if Russia is present, it will reassess its sponsorship of the tournament. Other sponsors have made similar announcements.

After the IIHF announced that the World Juniors would go ahead in Canada, the German hockey federation called on the IIHF to provide similar clarity to the situation with regard to the Men's World tournament.

=== Impact on Women's Under 18 Championship ===
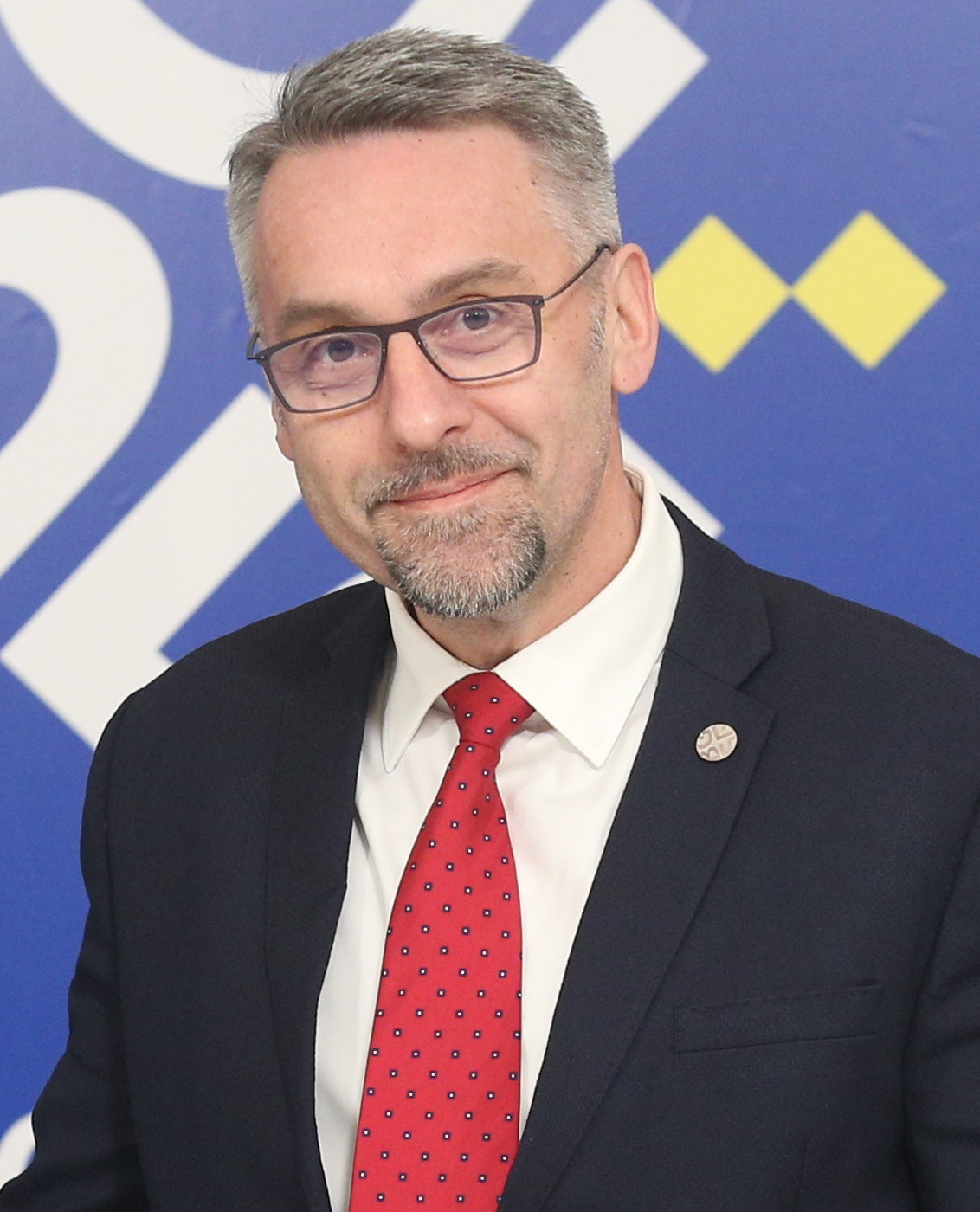
Czech Interior Minister Lubomír Metnar announced that the Czech Republic would bar Russians from entry.

The IIHF U18 Women's World Championship is set to be held in Ostrava, Czech Republic, in January 2027.

On 18 November 2026, the Czech minister of the interior, Lubomír Metnar, announced that the Czech Republic would not allow the Russian team to enter the country, barring them from participating in the tournament. He explained that although the Czech Republic is part of the Schengen Area, there are ways for the Czech Republic to block entry even if an individual tries to enter the Czech Republic via a different Schengen country.

=== Russian response ===
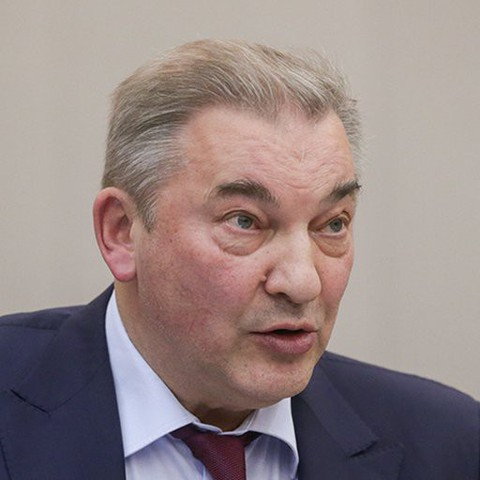
Vladislav Tretiak, president of the RIHF, criticised the Canadian decision and the proposed boycotts (photo courtesy State Duma of the Russian Federation)

On 13 November 2026, the president of the RIHF, Vladislav Tretiak, announced that Russia will seek compensation from Canada and Germany if either country banned Russian players from competing in the upcoming tournaments. He also stated that the RIHF will push for the tournaments to be moved and for sanctions against the organizers, and will ask the IIHF to consider ethics complaints against teams and players which refuse to compete against Russian players.

Addressing the Russian presidential council on sports, President Vladimir Putin stated that the threatened boycotts by other national teams are the result of pressure from their governments.

On 15 November 2026, the RIHF issued a strongly worded response to the IIHF decision. It stated that the decision to hold the competition in Canada and exclude Russia was made for purely political reason and was illegal and contrary to Olympian principles. The RIHF intended to appeal to the International Olympic Committee and seek compensation from Canada.

== IIHF requests review of CAS decision ==
On 13 November 2026, Gord Miller, a reporter with the Canadian sports broadcaster TSN, reported on social media that the IIHF had filed a request for review of the CAS decision, on the basis that two of the panel members had undisclosed ties with Russia. Following that report, other media sources also reported that a review had been filed. An American news outlet, The Athletic, reported that a source who spoke on condition of anonymity had confirmed the story. Neither the IIHF nor the CAS have commented on the reports.

On 20 November 2026, the Swedish media outlet Expressen reported that the CAS had rejected the IIHF's request for a review of the 30 October decision because it was out of time. The spokesperson for the CAS was quoted as saying that there was a two-week deadline to file a challenge with the CAS itself, which the IIHF had missed. However, the spokesperson indicated that the IIHF could file a request for a review with the Federal Supreme Court of Switzerland, after the CAS issues the full written decision.
