= Tinus Luc Koblar =

Norwegian ice hockey player (born 2007)

- Born: 21 July 2007 (age 19) Slovenia
- Height: 6 ft 2 in (188 cm)
- Weight: 176 lb (80 kg; 12 st 8 lb)
- Position: Centre
- Shoots: Left
- SHL team: Rögle BK
- National team: Norway
- NHL draft: 64th overall, 2025; Toronto Maple Leafs
- Playing career: 2025–present

Tinus Luc Koblar (born 21 July 2007) is a Norwegian professional ice hockey player who is a centre for Rögle BK of the Swedish Hockey League (SHL). His NHL rights are held by the Toronto Maple Leafs, who drafted him in the second round (64th overall) of the 2025 NHL entry draft.

== Early life ==
Koblar was born in Slovenia to Slovenian parents biathlete Andreja Koblar (née Grašič) and alpine skier Jernej Koblar. Koblar first played hockey in Bled, Slovenia. Koblar's father became a coach for the Norwegian national alpine ski team, and Koblar was raised in Norway. Since childhood, Koblar has looked up to Slovenian hockey player Anže Kopitar, who is also a family friend.

Koblar trained with Storhamar Hockey, playing for the under-20 team at age 15. Koblar was scouted by Leksands IF and moved to Sweden at age 16 to train with the organization, joining the under-18 team.

== Playing career ==
In the 2025 NHL entry draft, Koblar was drafted 64th overall by the Toronto Maple Leafs. In the 2025–26 season, at age 18, Koblar began playing for Leksands IF's Swedish Hockey League (SHL) team, appearing in 47 games.

By June 15, 2026, Koblar had been signed to a three-year entry-level contract for the Maple Leafs. Koblar would be invited to the Leafs' training camp and played in two pre-season games before being returned to Rögle BK of the Swedish Hockey League.

Medal record

Men's ice hockey

Representing Norway

World Championships
Bronze medal – third place	2026 Switzerland	

== Career statistics ==
=== Regular season and playoffs ===
			Regular season					Playoffs
Season	Team	League	GP	G	A	Pts	PIM	GP	G	A	Pts	PIM
2022–23	Storhamar U20	U20	10	0	3	3	0	3	0	0	0	2
2023–24	Leksands IF	J18	22	9	23	32	0	—	—	—	—	—
2023–24	Leksands IF	J20	2	0	0	0	0	—	—	—	—	—
2024–25	Leksands IF	J18	5	2	5	7	4	—	—	—	—	—
2024–25	Leksands IF	J20	43	8	13	21	14	7	4	0	4	4
2025–26	Leksands IF	SHL	47	8	6	14	24	—	—	—	—	—
SHL totals			47	8	6	14	24	—	—	—	—	—
