= 2027 World Junior Ice Hockey Championships – Division I =

International youth ice hockey tournament

2027 IIHF U20 World Championship Division I
Tournament details
- Host countries: Hungary; Poland
- Venues: 2 (in 2 host cities)
- Dates: 6–12 December 2026; 5–11 December 2026
- Teams: 12

The 2027 World Junior Ice Hockey Championships Division I will be two international under-20 ice hockey tournaments organized by the International Ice Hockey Federation. Division I A represents the second tier and Division I B the third tier of the IIHF World Junior Championship. For each tier, the first-placed team will be promoted to the next higher tier, while the last-placed team will be relegated to the next lower tier.

To be eligible as a junior player in these tournaments, a player couldn't be born earlier than 2007.

== Division I A ==
2027 IIHF U20 World Championship Division I A

Tournament details
- Host country: Hungary
- City: Budapest
- Venue: 1 (in 1 host city)
- Dates: 6–12 December 2026
- Teams: 6

Official website
- www.iihf.com

The Division I A tournament will be played in Budapest, Hungary, from 6 to 12 December 2026.

=== Participating teams ===
Team	Qualification
Denmark	placed 10th in Top Division last year and were relegated
Kazakhstan	placed 2nd in Division I A last year
Austria	placed 3rd in Division I A last year
Slovenia	placed 4th in Division I A last year
Ukraine	placed 5th in Division I A last year
Hungary (hosts)	placed 1st in Division I B last year and were promoted

=== Preliminary round ===
==== Group A ====
Pos	Team	Pld	W	OTW	OTL	L	GF	GA	GD	Pts	Promotion or relegation
1	Denmark	0	0	0	0	0	0	0	0	0	Semifinals
2	Slovenia	0	0	0	0	0	0	0	0	0	Semifinals
3	Ukraine	0	0	0	0	0	0	0	0	0	Placement series

First match(es) will be played: 6 December 2026. Source: IIHF
Rules for classification: 1) points; 2) head-to-head points; 3) head-to-head goal difference; 4) head-to-head number of goals scored; 5) result against closest best-ranked team outside tied teams; 6) result against next best-ranked team outside tied teams; 7) seeding before tournament.

==== Group B ====
Pos	Team	Pld	W	OTW	OTL	L	GF	GA	GD	Pts	Promotion or relegation
1	Kazakhstan	0	0	0	0	0	0	0	0	0	Semifinals
2	Austria	0	0	0	0	0	0	0	0	0	Semifinals
3	Hungary (H)	0	0	0	0	0	0	0	0	0	Placement series

First match(es) will be played: 6 December 2026. Source: IIHF
Rules for classification: 1) points; 2) head-to-head points; 3) head-to-head goal difference; 4) head-to-head number of goals scored; 5) result against closest best-ranked team outside tied teams; 6) result against next best-ranked team outside tied teams; 7) seeding before tournament.
(H) Host

==== Schedule ====
All times are local, CET (UTC+1).

6 December 2026; 12:30pm	Ukraine	v	Austria	Vasas Icecenter, Budapest

6 December 2026; 4:00pm	Hungary	v	Denmark	Vasas Icecenter, Budapest

6 December 2026; 7:30pm	Slovenia	v	Kazakhstan	Vasas Icecenter, Budapest

7 December 2026; 12:30pm	Kazakhstan	v	Ukraine	Vasas Icecenter, Budapest

7 December 2026; 4:00pm	Denmark	v	Austria	Vasas Icecenter, Budapest

7 December 2026; 7:30pm	Slovenia	v	Hungary	Vasas Icecenter, Budapest

9 December 2026; 12:30pm	Austria	v	Slovenia	Vasas Icecenter, Budapest

9 December 2026; 4:00pm	Denmark	v	Kazakhstan	Vasas Icecenter, Budapest

9 December 2026; 7:30pm	Ukraine	v	Hungary	Vasas Icecenter, Budapest

=== Playoff round ===
==== Bracket ====
Placement series
3A
3B

Semifinals
1A
2B
1B
2A

Final
Third place

==== Placement series ====
11 December 2026; 12:30pm	v	Vasas Icecenter, Budapest

12 December 2026; 12:30pm	v	Vasas Icecenter, Budapest

==== Semifinals ====
11 December 2026; 4:00pm	v	Vasas Icecenter, Budapest

11 December 2026; 7:30pm	v	Vasas Icecenter, Budapest

==== Bronze medal game ====
12 December 2026; 4:00pm	v	Vasas Icecenter, Budapest

==== Gold medal game ====
12 December 2026; 7:30pm	v	Vasas Icecenter, Budapest

== Division I B ==
2027 IIHF U20 World Championship Division I B

Tournament details
- Host country: Poland
- City: Krynica-Zdrój
- Venue: 1 (in 1 host city)
- Dates: 5–11 December 2026
- Teams: 6

Official website
- www.iihf.com

The Division I B tournament will be played in Krynica-Zdrój, Poland, from 5 to 11 December 2026.

=== Participating teams ===
Team	Qualification
France	placed 6th in Division I A last year and were relegated
Estonia	placed 2nd in Division I B last year
Lithuania	placed 3rd in Division I B last year
Poland (hosts)	placed 4th in Division I B last year
Japan	placed 5th in Division I B last year
South Korea	placed 1st in Division II A last year and were promoted

=== Preliminary round ===
==== Group A ====
Pos	Team	Pld	W	OTW	OTL	L	GF	GA	GD	Pts	Promotion or relegation
1	France	0	0	0	0	0	0	0	0	0	Semifinals
2	Poland (H)	0	0	0	0	0	0	0	0	0	Semifinals
3	Japan	0	0	0	0	0	0	0	0	0	Placement series

First match(es) will be played: 5 December 2026. Source: IIHF
Rules for classification: 1) points; 2) head-to-head points; 3) head-to-head goal difference; 4) head-to-head number of goals scored; 5) result against closest best-ranked team outside tied teams; 6) result against next best-ranked team outside tied teams; 7) seeding before tournament.
(H) Host

==== Group B ====
Pos	Team	Pld	W	OTW	OTL	L	GF	GA	GD	Pts	Promotion or relegation
1	Estonia	0	0	0	0	0	0	0	0	0	Semifinals
2	Lithuania	0	0	0	0	0	0	0	0	0	Semifinals
3	South Korea	0	0	0	0	0	0	0	0	0	Placement series

First match(es) will be played: 5 December 2026. Source: IIHF
Rules for classification: 1) points; 2) head-to-head points; 3) head-to-head goal difference; 4) head-to-head number of goals scored; 5) result against closest best-ranked team outside tied teams; 6) result against next best-ranked team outside tied teams; 7) seeding before tournament.

==== Schedule ====
All times are local, CET (UTC+1).

5 December 2026; 12:30pm	Japan	v	Lithuania	Krynica Ice Stadium, Krynica-Zdrój

5 December 2026; 4:00pm	Poland	v	Estonia	Krynica Ice Stadium, Krynica-Zdrój

5 December 2026; 7:30pm	South Korea	v	France	Krynica Ice Stadium, Krynica-Zdrój

6 December 2026; 12:30pm	Estonia	v	Japan	Krynica Ice Stadium, Krynica-Zdrój

6 December 2026; 4:00pm	France	v	Lithuania	Krynica Ice Stadium, Krynica-Zdrój

6 December 2026; 7:30pm	Poland	v	South Korea	Krynica Ice Stadium, Krynica-Zdrój

8 December 2026; 12:30pm	France	v	Estonia	Krynica Ice Stadium, Krynica-Zdrój

8 December 2026; 4:00pm	Lithuania	v	Poland	Krynica Ice Stadium, Krynica-Zdrój

8 December 2026; 7:30pm	Japan	v	South Korea	Krynica Ice Stadium, Krynica-Zdrój

=== Playoff round ===
==== Bracket ====
Placement series
3A
3B

Semifinals
1A
2B
1B
2A

Final
Third place

==== Placement series ====
10 December 2026; 12:30pm	v	Krynica Ice Stadium, Krynica-Zdrój

11 December 2026; 12:30pm	v	Krynica Ice Stadium, Krynica-Zdrój

==== Semifinals ====
10 December 2026; 4:00pm	v	Krynica Ice Stadium, Krynica-Zdrój

10 December 2026; 7:30pm	v	Krynica Ice Stadium, Krynica-Zdrój

==== Bronze medal game ====
11 December 2026; 4:00pm	v	Krynica Ice Stadium, Krynica-Zdrój

==== Gold medal game ====
11 December 2026; 7:30pm	v	Krynica Ice Stadium, Krynica-Zdrój
