= 2027 World Junior Ice Hockey Championships – Division II =

International youth ice hockey tournament

2027 IIHF U20 World Championship Division II
Tournament details
- Host countries: Croatia; Serbia
- Venues: 2 (in 2 host cities)
- Dates: 10–16 January 2027; 17–23 January 2027
- Teams: 12

The 2027 World Junior Ice Hockey Championships Division II will be two international under-20 ice hockey tournaments organized by the International Ice Hockey Federation. Division II A represents the fourth tier and Division II B the fifth tier of the IIHF World Junior Championship. For each tier, the first-placed team will be promoted to the next higher tier, while the last-placed team will be relegated to the next lower tier.

To be eligible as a junior player in these tournaments, a player couldn't be born earlier than 2007.

== Division II A ==
2027 IIHF U20 World Championship Division II A
Tournament details
- Host country: Croatia
- City: Zagreb
- Venue: 1 (in 1 host city)
- Dates: 10–16 January 2027
- Teams: 6

Official website
- www.iihf.com

The Division II A tournament will be played in Zagreb, Croatia, from 10 and 16 January 2027.

=== Participating teams ===
Team	Qualification
Italy	placed 10th in Division I B last year and were relegated
Great Britain	placed 2nd in Division II A last year
Croatia (hosts)	placed 3rd in Division II A last year
Romania	placed 4th in Division II A last year
China	placed 5th in Division II A last year
Netherlands	placed 1st in Division II B last year and were promoted

=== Preliminary round ===
==== Group A ====
Pos	Team	Pld	W	OTW	OTL	L	GF	GA	GD	Pts	Promotion or relegation
1	Italy	0	0	0	0	0	0	0	0	0	Semifinals
2	Romania	0	0	0	0	0	0	0	0	0	Semifinals
3	China	0	0	0	0	0	0	0	0	0	Placement series

First match(es) will be played: 10 January 2027. Source: IIHF
Rules for classification: 1) points; 2) head-to-head points; 3) head-to-head goal difference; 4) head-to-head number of goals scored; 5) result against closest best-ranked team outside tied teams; 6) result against next best-ranked team outside tied teams; 7) seeding before tournament.

==== Group B ====
Pos	Team	Pld	W	OTW	OTL	L	GF	GA	GD	Pts	Promotion or relegation
1	Great Britain	0	0	0	0	0	0	0	0	0	Semifinals
2	Croatia (H)	0	0	0	0	0	0	0	0	0	Semifinals
3	Netherlands	0	0	0	0	0	0	0	0	0	Placement series

First match(es) will be played: 10 January 2027. Source: IIHF
Rules for classification: 1) points; 2) head-to-head points; 3) head-to-head goal difference; 4) head-to-head number of goals scored; 5) result against closest best-ranked team outside tied teams; 6) result against next best-ranked team outside tied teams; 7) seeding before tournament.
(H) Host

==== Schedule ====
All times are local, CET (UTC+1).

10 January 2027; 12:30pm	Romania	v	Great Britain	Admiral Ice Dome, Zagreb

10 January 2027; 4:00pm	Netherlands	v	Italy	Admiral Ice Dome, Zagreb

10 January 2027; 7:30pm	China	v	Croatia	Admiral Ice Dome, Zagreb

11 January 2027; 12:30pm	Romania	v	Netherlands	Admiral Ice Dome, Zagreb

11 January 2027; 4:00pm	Great Britain	v	China	Admiral Ice Dome, Zagreb

11 January 2027; 7:30pm	Italy	v	Croatia	Admiral Ice Dome, Zagreb

13 January 2027; 12:30pm	China	v	Netherlands	Admiral Ice Dome, Zagreb

13 January 2027; 4:00pm	Italy	v	Croatia	Admiral Ice Dome, Zagreb

13 January 2027; 7:30pm	Croatia	v	Romania	Admiral Ice Dome, Zagreb

=== Playoff round ===
==== Bracket ====
Placement series
3A
3B

Semifinals
1A
2B
1B
2A

Final
Third place

==== Placement series ====
15 January 2027; 12:30pm	v	Admiral Ice Dome, Zagreb

16 January 2027; 12:30pm	v	Admiral Ice Dome, Zagreb

==== Semifinals ====
15 January 2027; 4:00pm	v	Admiral Ice Dome, Zagreb

15 January 2027; 7:30pm	v	Admiral Ice Dome, Zagreb

==== Bronze medal game ====
16 January 2027; 4:00pm	v	Admiral Ice Dome, Zagreb

==== Gold medal game ====
16 January 2027; 7:30pm	v	Admiral Ice Dome, Zagreb

== Division II B ==
2027 IIHF U20 World Championship Division II B

Tournament details
- Host country: Serbia
- City: Belgrade
- Venue: 1 (in 1 host city)
- Dates: 17–23 January 2027
- Teams: 6

Official website
- www.iihf.com

The Division II B tournament will be played in Belgrade, Serbia, from 17 to 23 January 2027.

=== Participating teams ===
Team	Qualification
Spain	placed 6th in Division II A last year and were relegated
Australia	placed 2nd in Division II B last year
Israel	placed 3rd in Division II B last year
Serbia (hosts)	placed 4th in Division II B last year
New Zealand	placed 5th in Division II B last year
Chinese Taipei	placed 1st in Division III A last year and were promoted

=== Preliminary round ===
==== Group A ====
Pos	Team	Pld	W	OTW	OTL	L	GF	GA	GD	Pts	Promotion or relegation
1	Spain	0	0	0	0	0	0	0	0	0	Semifinals
2	Serbia (H)	0	0	0	0	0	0	0	0	0	Semifinals
3	New Zealand	0	0	0	0	0	0	0	0	0	Placement series

First match(es) will be played: 17 January 2027. Source: IIHF
Rules for classification: 1) points; 2) head-to-head points; 3) head-to-head goal difference; 4) head-to-head number of goals scored; 5) result against closest best-ranked team outside tied teams; 6) result against next best-ranked team outside tied teams; 7) seeding before tournament.
(H) Host

==== Group B ====
Pos	Team	Pld	W	OTW	OTL	L	GF	GA	GD	Pts	Promotion or relegation
1	Australia	0	0	0	0	0	0	0	0	0	Semifinals
2	Israel	0	0	0	0	0	0	0	0	0	Semifinals
3	Chinese Taipei	0	0	0	0	0	0	0	0	0	Placement series

First match(es) will be played: 17 January 2027. Source: IIHF
Rules for classification: 1) points; 2) head-to-head points; 3) head-to-head goal difference; 4) head-to-head number of goals scored; 5) result against closest best-ranked team outside tied teams; 6) result against next best-ranked team outside tied teams; 7) seeding before tournament.

==== Schedule ====
All times are local, CET (UTC+1).

17 January 2027; 12:30pm	New Zealand	v	Israel	Pionir Ice Hall, Belgrade

17 January 2027; 4:00pm	Chinese Taipei	v	Spain	Pionir Ice Hall, Belgrade

17 January 2027; 7:30pm	Serbia	v	Australia	Pionir Ice Hall, Belgrade

18 January 2027; 12:30pm	Spain	v	Israel	Pionir Ice Hall, Belgrade

18 January 2027; 4:00pm	Australia	v	New Zealand	Pionir Ice Hall, Belgrade

18 January 2027; 7:30pm	Serbia	v	Chinese Taipei	Pionir Ice Hall, Belgrade

20 January 2027; 12:30pm	New Zealand	v	Chinese Taipei	Pionir Ice Hall, Belgrade

20 January 2027; 4:00pm	Spain	v	Australia	Pionir Ice Hall, Belgrade

20 January 2027; 7:30pm	Israel	v	Serbia	Pionir Ice Hall, Belgrade

=== Playoff round ===
==== Bracket ====
Placement series
3A
3B

Semifinals
1A
2B
1B
2A

Final
Third place

==== Placement series ====
22 January 2027; 12:30pm	v	Pionir Ice Hall, Belgrade

23 January 2027; 12:30pm	v	Pionir Ice Hall, Belgrade

==== Semifinals ====
22 January 2027; 4:00pm	v	Pionir Ice Hall, Belgrade

22 January 2027; 7:30pm	v	Pionir Ice Hall, Belgrade

==== Bronze medal game ====
23 January 2027; 4:00pm	v	Pionir Ice Hall, Belgrade

==== Gold medal game ====
23 January 2027; 7:30pm	v	Pionir Ice Hall, Belgrade
