= 2014 World Junior Ice Hockey Championships – Division I =

International ice hockey tournament

2014 IIHF U20 World Championship Division I

Tournament details
- Host countries: Poland; Great Britain
- Venues: 2 (in 2 host cities)
- Dates: 15–21 December 2013; 9–15 December 2013
- Teams: 12

The 2014 World Junior Ice Hockey Championship Division I was a pair of international under-20 ice hockey tournaments organized by the International Ice Hockey Federation. In each of the two groups, six teams played a round-robin tournament; the first-placed team was promoted to a higher level, while the last-placed team was relegated to a lower level. Divisions I A and I B represent the second and third tier of the World Junior Ice Hockey Championships.

Denmark won Division I A and were promoted to the Top Division for 2015, while Poland finished last and were relegated to Division I B. Italy won Division I B and were promoted to Division I A for 2015, while Japan finished last. However, Japan were not relegated, as Great Britain had used an ineligible player and thus saw their games later recorded as forfeits, and the team relegated.

== Division I A ==
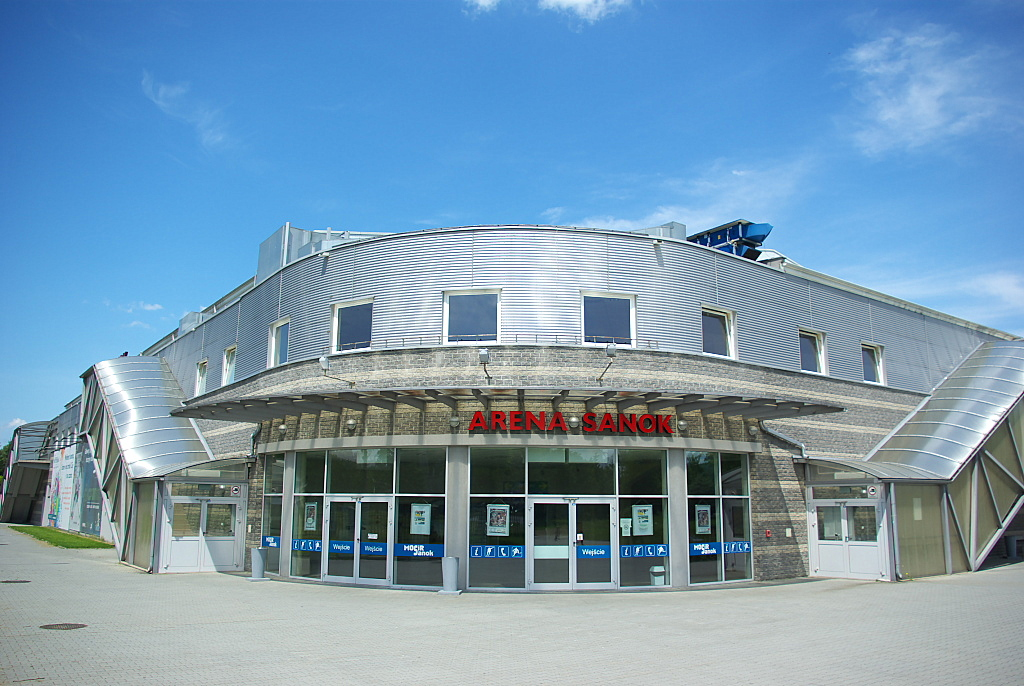
Arena Sanok, host arena of 2014 Division I A tournament

The Division I A tournament was played in Sanok, Poland, from 15 to 21 December 2013.

=== Participating teams ===
| Team | Qualification |
|---|---|
| Latvia | placed 10th in Top Division last year and were relegated |
| Belarus | placed 2nd in Division I A last year |
| Denmark | placed 3rd in Division I A last year |
| Slovenia | placed 4th in Division I A last year |
| Austria | placed 5th in Division I A last year |
| Poland | hosts; placed 1st in Division I B last year and were promoted |

=== Final standings ===
| Pos | Team | Pld | W | OTW | OTL | L | GF | GA | GD | Pts | Promotion or relegation |
|---|---|---|---|---|---|---|---|---|---|---|---|
| 1 | Denmark | 5 | 5 | 0 | 0 | 0 | 20 | 10 | +10 | 15 | Promoted to the 2015 Top Division |
| 2 | Latvia | 5 | 4 | 0 | 0 | 1 | 23 | 7 | +16 | 12 | |
| 3 | Belarus | 5 | 3 | 0 | 0 | 2 | 23 | 14 | +9 | 9 | |
| 4 | Austria | 5 | 2 | 0 | 0 | 3 | 10 | 14 | −4 | 6 | |
| 5 | Slovenia | 5 | 0 | 1 | 0 | 4 | 11 | 28 | −17 | 2 | |
| 6 | Poland (H) | 5 | 0 | 0 | 1 | 4 | 6 | 20 | −14 | 1 | Relegated to the 2015 Division I B |

Source: IIHF
(H) Host

=== Match results ===
All times are local (Central European Time – UTC+1).

| 15 December 2013; 13:00 | Slovenia | 3–7 (1–3, 1–1, 1–3) | Belarus | Arena Sanok; Attendance: 100 |

Game reference

Tomaz Trelc
Zan Us
Goalies
Mikhail Karnaukhov
Referee:
(United States) Christopher Pitoscia
Linesmen:
(Czech Republic) Marek Hlavatý
(Croatia) Trpimir Piragić

| | 0–1 | Y. Voronov (A. Kogalev) – 11:42 |
| | 0–2 | I. Varivonchik (N. Kryskin, I. Rybchik) – 14:55 |
| 19:03 – N. Pem (K. Drozg, L. Petelin) | 1–2 |
| | 1–3 | Y. Voronov (Y. Lisovets) – 19:14 |
| | 1–4 | D. Zhelnerovsky (D. Ambrozheichik, N. Kryskin) – 34:25 |
| 35:43 – L. Petelin (K. Drozg, N. Pem) (PP) | 2–4 |
| | 2–5 | A. Kirechko – 42:25 |
| | 2–6 | A. Gavrus (A. Karakulko) (SH) – 54:51 |
| 55:21 – M. Potocnik (J. Podrekar, Uduc) (PP) | 3–6 |
| | 3–7 | A. Gavrus (D. Ambrozheichik, A. Karakulko) – 55:43 |

6 min
Penalties
22 min
22
Shots
48

| 15 December 2013; 16:30 | Austria | 1–3 (0–0, 0–2, 1–1) | Denmark | Arena Sanok; Attendance: 300 |

Game reference

David Kickert
Goalies
George Sørensen
Referee:
(Czech Republic) Vladimír Pešina
Linesmen:
(Poland) Artur Hyliński
(Poland) Wojciech Moszczyński

| | 0–1 | 22:26 – O. Bjorkstrand (M. Eller) |
| | 0–2 | 25:55 – M. Nielsen (C. Frederiksen) |
| M. Richter – 41:18 | 1–2 |
| | 1–3 | 58:51 – M. Asperup (M. Nielsen, M. Aagaard) |

14 min
Penalties
20 min
25
Shots
37

| 15 December 2013; 20:00 | Poland | 0–5 (0–1, 0–1, 0–3) | Latvia | Arena Sanok; Attendance: 1,200 |

Game reference

David Zabolotny
Goalies
Elvis Merzļikins
Referee:
(Italy) Daniel Gamper
Linesmen:
(Slovakia) Martin Korba
(Switzerland) Simon Wüst

| 0–1 | 12:37 – R. Lipsbergs (K. Bazevičs) |
| 0–2 | 29:27 – R. Lipsbergs (E. Augstkalns, Maslovskis) (PP) |
| 0–3 | 44:26 – R. Ābols (R. Kalvītis, E. Kulda) (PP) |
| 0–4 | 59:04 – G. Golovkovs (R. Kalvītis, R. Lipsbergs) (PP) |
| 0–5 | 59:54 – R. Ābols (P. Škuratovs, E. Kulda) |

14 min
Penalties
16 min
14
Shots
36

| 16 December 2013; 13:00 | Belarus | 4–1 (0–0, 1–1, 3–0) | Austria | Arena Sanok; Attendance: 200 |

Game reference

Mikhail Karnaukhov
Goalies
David Kickert
Referee:
(France) Jimmy Bergamelli
Linesmen:
(Czech Republic) Marek Hlavatý
(Switzerland) Simon Wüst

| A. Karakulko (A. Gavrus, A. Yatskevich) – 34:47 | 1–0 |
| | 1–1 | 36:26 – A. Cijan (J. Bischofberger, P. Berr) |
| D. Ambrozheichik (K. Khenkel, N. Voles – 49:33 | 2–1 |
| I. Rybchik (A. Gavrus, A. Karakulko) – 55:27 | 3–1 |
| Y. Lisovets (D. Ambrozheichik, D. Zalamay) – 57:54 | 4–1 |

14 min
Penalties
14 min
43
Shots
6

| 16 December 2013; 16:30 | Latvia | 10–0 (3–0, 4–0, 3–0) | Slovenia | Arena Sanok; Attendance: 150 |

Game reference

Ivars Punnenovs
Goalies
Zan Us
Tomaz Trelc
Referee:
(Czech Republic) Vladimír Pešina
Linesmen:
(Poland) Artur Hyliński
(Italy) Ulrich Pardatscher

| H. Egle (J. Jaks) – 10:42 | 1–0 |
| E. Kulda (R. Ābols) – 13:19 | 2–0 |
| R. Rosinskis (E. Kulda, R. Ābols) (PP) – 17:05 | 3–0 |
| Ņ. Jevpalovs (P. Škuratovs, R. Kondrats) – 23:29 | 4–0 |
| B. Birzitis – 25:38 | 5–0 |
| R. Lipsbergs (Ņ. Jevpalovs, G. Golovkovs) (PP) – 34:06 | 6–0 |
| L. Mazurs-Mago – 37:31 | 7–0 |
| Ņ. Jevpalovs (R. Kondrats) – 41:01 | 8–0 |
| R. Ābols (E. Kulda) (PP) – 46:27 | 9–0 |
| R. Maslovskis (Ņ. Jevpalovs, G. Golovkovs) (PP) – 48:05 | 10–0 |

8 min
Penalties
14 min
31
Shots
19

| 16 December 2013; 20:00 | Denmark | 4–2 (3–0, 1–0, 0–2) | Poland | Arena Sanok; Attendance: 700 |

Game reference

Georg Sorensen
Goalies
David Zabolotny
Referee:
(United States) Christopher Pitoscia
Linesmen:
(Slovakia) Martin Korba
(Croatia) Trpimir Piragić

| N. Ehlers (B. Uldall) (PP) – 08:35 | 1–0 |
| C. Frederiksen (M. Aagaard, M. Asperup) (PP) – 12:00 | 2–0 |
| M. Asperup (L. Korsgaard, M. Aagaard) (PP) – 17:19 | 3–0 |
| N. Ehlers (L. Korsgaard) – 23:43 | 4–0 |
| | 4–1 | 44:40 – F. Wielkiewicz (B. Fraszko, J. Giminski) |
| | 4–2 | 45:01 – B. Fraszko (P. Wronka) (PP) |

20 min
Penalties
36 min
37
Shots
24

| 18 December 2013; 13:00 | Latvia | 3–0 (0–0, 3–0, 0–0) | Austria | Arena Sanok; Attendance: 130 |

Game reference

Ivars Punnenovs
Goalies
David Kickert
Stefan Müller
Referee:
(United States) Christopher Pitoscia
Linesmen:
(Czech Republic) Marek Hlavatý
(Switzerland) Simon Wüst

| R. Lipsbergs (Ņ. Jevpalovs, E. Augstkalns) (PP) – 24:08 | 1–0 |
| R. Lipsbergs (R. Maslovskis, G. Golovkovs – 27:22 | 2–0 |
| G. Golovkovs (E. Augstkalns, Ņ. Jevpalovs) (PP) – 36:52 | 3–0 |

22 min
Penalties
28 min
20
Shots
21

| 18 December 2013; 16:30 | Belarus | 4–5 (1–3, 0–1, 2–1) | Denmark | Arena Sanok; Attendance: 150 |

Game reference

Mikhail Karnaukhov
Goalies
Georg Sørensen
Referee:
(Italy) Daniel Gamper
Linesmen:
(Poland) Artur Hyliński
(Poland) Wojciech Moszczyński

| | 0–1 | 04:42 – O. Bjorkstrand (M. Eller, K. Lauridsen (PP) |
| A. Kogalov (D. Ambrozheichik, Y. Lisovets) (PP) – 12:47 | 1–1 |
| | 1–2 | 14:24 – M. Nielsen (N. Ehlers) |
| | 1–3 | 18:46 – M. Aagaard (M. Larsen, R. Lyo) |
| | 1–4 | 28:53 – M. Aagaard (K. Lauridsen) (PP) |
| | 1–5 | 46:13 – M. Asperup (M. Aagaard, S. Andersen) |
| A. Karakulko (A. Kogalov, Y. Lisovets) (PP) – 47:19 | 2–5 |
| D. Ambrozheichik (A. Gavrus) – 50:50 | 3–5 |
| Y. Voronov (A. Karakulko, A. Gavrus) – 59:59 | 4–5 |

43 min
Penalties
30 min
46
Shots
20

| 18 December 2013; 20:00 | Poland | 2–3 GWS (1–0, 1–1, 0–1) (OT: 0–0) (SO: 0–1) | Slovenia | Arena Sanok; Attendance: 600 |

Game reference

David Zabolotny
Goalies
Zan Us
Referee:
(France) Jimmy Bergamelli
Linesmen:
(Italy) Ulrich Pardatscher
(Croatia) Trpimir Piragic

| B. Fraszko (P. Wronka) – 03:07 | 1–0 |
| F. Wielkiewicz (B. Fraszko) (PP) – 29:15 | 2–0 |
| | 2–1 | 30:34 – J. Podrekar (V. Jazbec, J. Stan) |
| | 2–2 | 47:03 – Z. Jezovsek (A. Jeklic) |

P. Malicki (miss)
B. Fraszko (miss)
Shootout
M. Logar
K. Drozg
10 min
Penalties
10 min
32
Shots
22

| 19 December 2013; 13:00 | Denmark | 4–1 (1–0, 1–0, 2–1) | Latvia | Arena Sanok; Attendance: 350 |

Game reference

Georg Sorensen
Goalies
Elvis Merzļikins
Referee:
(France) Jimmy Bergamelli
Linesmen:
(Croatia) Trpimir Piragic
(Switzerland) Simon Wust

| M. Eller (O. Bjorkstrand, K. Lauridsen) – 12:22 | 1–0 |
| N. Ehlers (S. Hertzberg, A. Krogsgaard) - 37:03 | 2–0 |
| | 2–1 | 44:22 – R. Lipsbergs (N. Jevpalovs, E. Augstkalns) (PP) |
| S. Hertzberg (C. Frederiksen, M. Nielsen) – 55:06 | 3–1 |
| O. Bjorkstrand (M. Eller) (EN) – 59:59 | 4–1 |

6 min
Penalties
8 min
32
Shots
16

| 19 December 2013; 16:30 | Slovenia | 3–5 (2–3, 1–1, 0–1) | Austria | Arena Sanok; Attendance: 100 |

Game reference

Zan Us
Goalies
David Kickert
Referee:
(Italy) Daniel Gamper
Linesmen:
(Czech Republic) Marek Hlavaty
(Poland) Wojciech Moszczynski

| | 0–1 | 05:52 – B. Wolf (M. Richter, J. Bischofberger) |
| | 0–2 | 08:35 – A. Wukovits (T. Vallant, M. Richter) (PP) |
| L. Petelin (M. Logar, N. Pem) (PP) – 09:45 | 1–2 |
| | 1–3 | 11:54 – S. Fellinger (B. Wolf, P. Peter) |
| Z. Jezovsek (T. Ograjensek, N. Simsic) (PP) – 17:37 | 2–3 |
| J. Podrekar (A. Uduc, V. Jazbec) – 31:05 | 3–3 |
| | 3–4 | 35:58 – P. Peter (A. Cijan) |
| | 3–5 | 40:41 – M. Richter (L. Viveiros, A. Cijan) |

10 min
Penalties
43 min
25
Shots
23

| 19 December 2013; 20:00 | Belarus | 5–1 (2–0, 0–0, 3–1) | Poland | Arena Sanok; Attendance: 200 |

Game reference

Leonid Ruban
Goalies
David Zabolotny
Referee:
(Czech Republic) Vladimir Pesina
Linesmen:
(Slovakia) Martin Korba
(Italy) Ulrich Pardatshcer

| A. Yatskevich (A. Gavrus) – 01:06 | 1–0 |
| A. Gavrus (D. Ambrozheichik) – 10:57 | 2–0 |
| V. Kashkar (I. Rybchik, R. Dostanko) – 43:02 | 3–0 |
| V. Kashkar (D. Ambrozheichik, A. Kirechko) (PP) – 46:00 | 4–0 |
| I. Varivonchik – 46:27 | 5–0 |
| | 5–1 | 53:40 – F. Wielkiewicz (PP) |

14 min
Penalties
10 min
41
Shots
21

| 21 December 2013; 13:00 | Denmark | 4–2 (1–0, 0–0, 3–2) | Slovenia | Arena Sanok; Attendance: 100 |

Game reference

Thomas Lillie
Goalies
Zan Us
Referee:
(Czech Republic) Vladimir Pesina
Linesmen:
(Slovakia) Martin Korba
(Italy) Ulrich Pardatscher

| S. Hertzberg (M. Aagaard, M. Larsen) (PP) – 11:49 | 1–0 |
| M. Aagaard (N. Ehlers, M. Nielsen) – 48:44 | 2–0 |
| M. Asperup (M. Aagaard, S. Hertzberg) (PP) – 51:22 | 3–0 |
| | 3–1 | 53:04 – K. Drozg (L. Petelin) |
| O. Bjorkstrand (M. Eller) – 53:39 | 4–1 |
| | 4–2 | 54:05 – K. Cepon (N. Pem, M. Logar) (PP) |

24 min
Penalties
8 min
30
Shots
27

| 21 December 2013; 16:30 | Latvia | 4–3 (1–3, 1–0, 2–0) | Belarus | Arena Sanok; Attendance: 200 |

Game reference

Elvis Merzļikins
Ivars Punnenovs
Goalies
Leonid Ruban
Mikhail Karnaukhov
Referee:
(Italy) Daniel Gamper
Linesmen:
(Poland) Artur Hyliński
(Poland) Wojciech Moszczyński

| | 0–1 | 02:44 – A. Gavrus (A. Kogalev, D. Ambrozheichik) |
| | 0–2 | 04:59 – I. Varivonchik (R. Dostanko) (SH) |
| | 0–3 | 11:49 – A. Gavrus (N. Kryskin, Y. Voronov) (PP) |
| J. Jaks (R. Maslovskis, G. Golovkovs) – 19:07 | 1–3 |
| Ņ. Jevpalovs (E. Kulda) (PP) – 32:17 | 2–3 |
| J. Jaks (E. Kulda, R. Lipsbergs) (PP) – 40:59 | 3–3 |
| Ņ. Jevpalovs (T. Bļugers, E. Kulda) (PP) – 58:46 | 4–3 |

16 min
Penalties
39 min
19
Shots
24

| 21 December 2013; 20:00 | Austria | 3–1 (2–0, 0–0, 1–1) | Poland | Arena Sanok; Attendance: 800 |

Game reference

David Kickert
Goalies
David Zabolotny
Referee:
(France) Jimmy Bergamelli
Linesmen:
(Czech Republic) Marek Hlavatý
(Switzerland) Simon Wüst

| P. Cirtek (L. Viveiros, K. Schraven) – 07:17 | 1–0 |
| M. Huber (C. Duller, S. Samardzic) (PP) – 13:49 | 2–0 |
| P. Kreuzer (P. Berr) – 42:49 | 3–0 |
| | 3–1 | 51:02 – P. Wronka |

30 min
Penalties
12 min
27
Shots
18

=== Statistics ===
==== Top 10 scorers ====
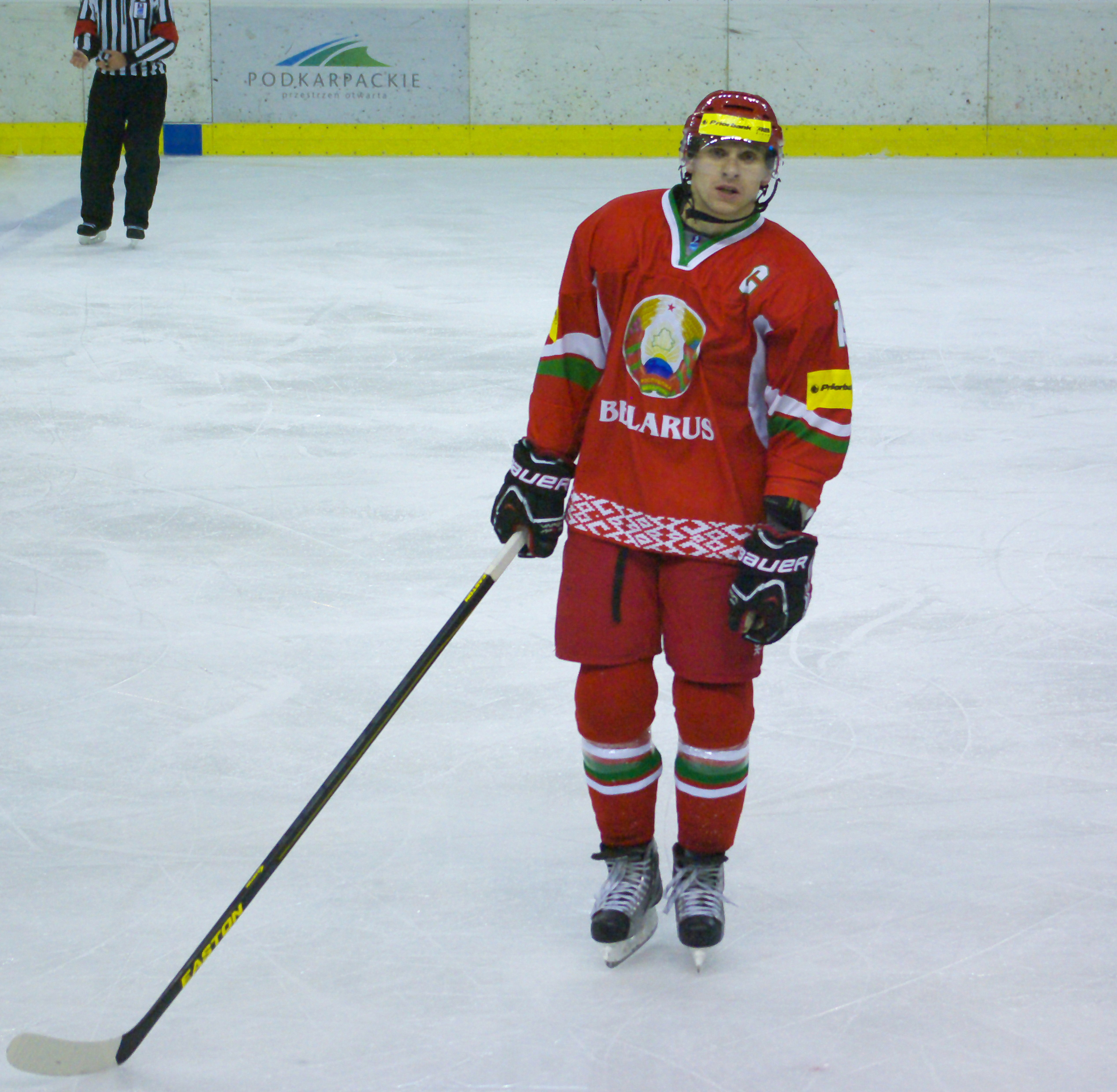
Artur Gavrus of Belarus led Division IA in scoring with 11 points.

| Pos | Player | Country | GP | G | A | Pts | +/- | PIM |
|---|---|---|---|---|---|---|---|---|
| 1 | Artur Gavrus | Belarus | 5 | 5 | 6 | 11 | +6 | 0 |
| 2 | Ņikita Jevpalovs | Latvia | 5 | 4 | 5 | 9 | -1 | 4 |
| 3 | Dmitri Ambrozheichik | Belarus | 5 | 3 | 6 | 9 | +3 | 0 |
| 4 | Mikkel Aagaard | Denmark | 5 | 3 | 5 | 8 | +3 | 2 |
| 5 | Roberts Lipsbergs | Latvia | 5 | 6 | 1 | 7 | 0 | 2 |
| 6 | Edgars Kulda | Latvia | 5 | 1 | 6 | 7 | 0 | 2 |
| 7 | Matthias Asperup | Denmark | 5 | 4 | 2 | 6 | +1 | 0 |
| 7 | Oliver Bjorkstrand | Denmark | 5 | 4 | 2 | 6 | +2 | 2 |
| 9 | Nikolaj Ehlers | Denmark | 5 | 2 | 4 | 6 | +6 | 4 |
| 9 | Alexander Karakulko | Belarus | 5 | 2 | 4 | 6 | +3 | 2 |

==== Goaltending leaders ====
(minimum 40% team's total ice time)

| Pos | Player | Country | MINS | GA | Sv% | GAA | SO |
|---|---|---|---|---|---|---|---|
| 1 | Ivars Punnenovs | Latvia | 171:39 | 1 | 98.31 | 0.35 | 2 |
| 2 | Georg Sørensen | Denmark | 240:00 | 8 | 92.79 | 2.00 | 0 |
| 3 | Elvis Merzļikins | Latvia | 127:09 | 5 | 90.00 | 2.36 | 1 |
| 4 | David Kickert | Austria | 280:00 | 14 | 89.78 | 3.00 | 0 |
| 5 | David Zabolotny | Poland | 305:00 | 20 | 87.73 | 3.93 | 0 |

=== Awards ===
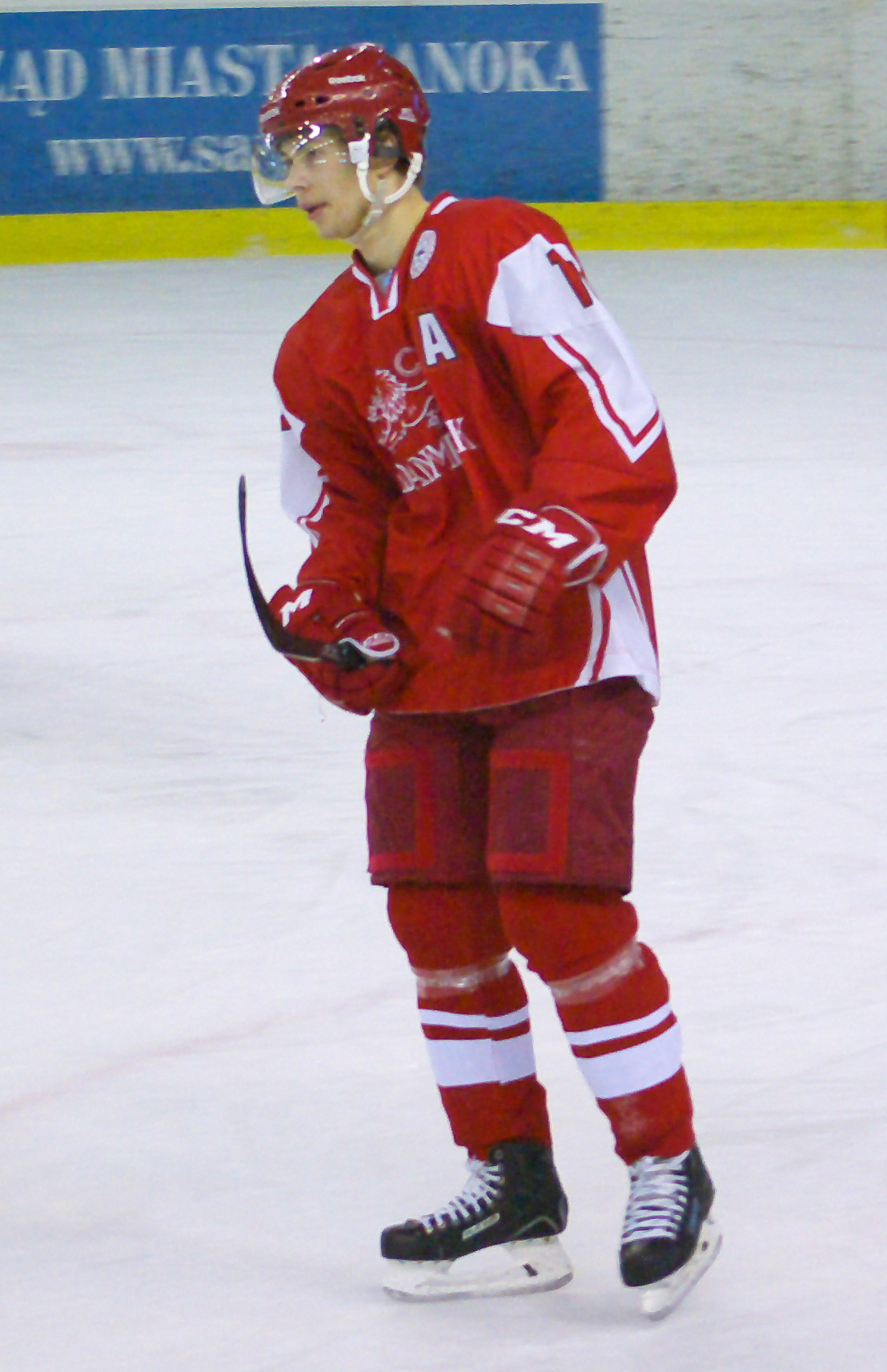
Danish forward Oliver Bjorkstrand was selected as the top forward in Division I A.

==== Best Players Selected by the Directorate ====
- Goaltender: (Austria) David Kickert
- Defenceman: (Latvia) Jānis Jaks
- Forward: (Denmark) Oliver Bjorkstrand

==== Best players of each team selected by the coaches ====
- (Austria) Patrick Peter
- (Belarus) Artur Gavrus
- (Denmark) Georg Sorensen
- (Latvia) Artūrs Ševčenko
- (Poland) David Zabolotny
- (Slovenia) Luka Petelin

== Division I B ==
The Division I B tournament was played in Dumfries, Great Britain, from 9 to 15 December 2013.

=== Participating teams ===
| Team | Qualification |
|---|---|
| France | placed 6th in Division I A last year and were relegated |
| Kazakhstan | placed 2nd in Division I B last year |
| Italy | placed 3rd in 20Division I B last year13 |
| Ukraine | placed 4th in Division I B last year |
| Great Britain | hosts; placed 5th in Division I B last year |
| Japan | placed 1st in Division II A last year and were promoted |

=== Final standings ===
| Pos | Team | Pld | W | OTW | OTL | L | GF | GA | GD | Pts | Promotion or relegation |
|---|---|---|---|---|---|---|---|---|---|---|---|
| 1 | Italy | 5 | 3 | 2 | 0 | 0 | 20 | 14 | +6 | 13 | Promoted to the 2015 Division I A |
| 2 | Kazakhstan | 5 | 4 | 0 | 0 | 1 | 28 | 16 | +12 | 12 | |
| 3 | France | 5 | 2 | 0 | 2 | 1 | 15 | 16 | −1 | 8 | |
| 4 | Ukraine | 5 | 2 | 0 | 0 | 3 | 11 | 15 | −4 | 6 | |
| 5 | Japan | 5 | 0 | 0 | 0 | 5 | 17 | 23 | −6 | 0 | |
| 6 | Great Britain (Note: Great Britain were disqualified due to use of an ineligible player and were relegated to the 2015 Division II A.) (D, H) | 5 | 1 | 1 | 1 | 2 | 13 | 20 | −7 | 6 | Relegated to the 2015 Division II A |

Source: IIHF
(D) Disqualified; (H) Host

=== Match results ===
All times are local (Greenwich Mean Time – UTC±0).

| 09 December 2013; 13:00 | Ukraine | 2–7 (1–4, 1–0, 0–3) | Kazakhstan | Dumfries Ice Bowl; Attendance: 480 |

Game reference

E.Zakharchenko
M.Shevchuk
Goalies
V.Sevidov
Referee:
(United States) Brett Sheva
Linesmen:
(Latvia) Maksims Bogdanovs
(United Kingdom) Andrew Dalton

| | 0–1 | 08:47 – S. Koshelev (K. Savitsky) |
| | 0–2 | 12:36 – I.Kinstler (N. Mikhailis) |
| V.Kutsevych (Y. Petrangovsky) – 14:15 | 1–2 |
| | 1–3 | 18:42 – N. Mikhailis (M. Ibraibekov, I. Kinstler) (PP) |
| | 1–4 | 19:52 – M. Ibraibekov (N. Kabiev) |
| V.Zakharov (V. Lyalka, M. Martyshko) – 26.15 | 2–4 |
| | 2–5 | 53:57 – N. Mikhailis (N. Kabiev, M. Ibraibekov) (PP) |
| | 2–6 | 56:14 – I. Kinstler (N. Mikhailis) |
| | 2–7 | 59:34 – N.Mikhailis (I. Kinstler, D. Kairov) |

8 min
Penalties
2 min
40
Shots
37

| 09 December 2013; 16:30 | Japan | 3–4 (1–1, 2–1, 0–2) | France | Dumfries Ice Bowl; Attendance: 212 |

Game reference

A. Sasaki
Goalies
A. Bonvalot
Referee:
(Finland) Stefan Funselius
Linesmen:
(Denmark) Morten Agertoft
(United Kingdom) Scott Dalgleish

| | 0–1 | 02:37 – F. Douay (K. Bozon) (PP) |
| K. Suzuki (PP) – 12:23 | 1–1 |
| S. Kudo (K. Kawamura) – 28:08 | 2–1 |
| Y. Aoki (K. Kido, K. Matsukane) (PP) – 34:23 | 3–1 |
| | 3–2 | 38:01 – R. Carpentier (L. Bogdanoff, F. Bourgeois) (PP) |
| | 3–3 | 40:51 – J. Saint Andre (F. Kazarine, L. Bogdanoff) |
| | 3–4 | 59:01 – J. Laplace (C. di Dio Balsamo) |

28 min
Penalties
8 min
24
Shots
42

| 09 December 2013; 13:30 | Great Britain | 3–4 OT (2–0, 1–2, 0–1) (OT: 0–1) | Italy | Dumfries Ice Bowl; Attendance: 475 |

Game reference

A.Goss
Goalies
M.Rabanser
Referee:
(Switzerland) Daniel Wirth
Linesmen:
(Belarus) Vasili Kaliada
(Canada) Nathan Vanoosten

| B. Chamberlain (J. Cownie) – 14:33 | 1–0 |
| S. Mackie (L. Stewart, R. Venus) (PP) – 17:03 | 2–0 |
| | 2–1 | 23:16 – J. Ramoser (G. Morini) |
| | 2–2 | 27:09 – R. Lacedelli (A. Alber, F. Pace |
| J. Cownie (L. Hook) (PP) – 32:19 | 3–2 |
| | 3–3 | 59:28 – J. Ramoser (D. Glira) (PP) |
| | 3–4 | 61:11 – J. Ramoser (G. Morini) |

8 min
Penalties
12 min
28
Shots
28

| 10 December 2013; 13:00 | Italy | 4–3 (1–2, 2–1, 1–0) | Japan | Dumfries Ice Bowl; Attendance: 445 |

Game reference

Daniel Morandell
Goalies
Keisuke Maekita
Referee:
(Hungary) Gergely Kincses
Linesmen:
(United Kingdom) Scott Dalgleish
(Belarus) Vasili Kaliada

| S. Vinatzer (P. Morini) (PP) – 09:06 | 1–0 |
| | 1–1 | 11:13 – Y. Hikosaka |
| | 1–2 | 12:21 – Y. Miura (J. Hashimoto) |
| | 1–3 | 23:37 – K. Suzuki Y. Hikosaka, R. Matsumoto) |
| T. Terzago (J. Pavlu) – 24:05 | 2–3 |
| J. Pavlu (T. Terzago, P. Hochkofler) – 29:03 | 3–3 |
| M. Marchetti (SH) – 42:12 | 4–3 |

4 min
Penalties
12 min
36
Shots
35

| 10 December 2013; 16:30 | France | 2–0 (1–0, 0–0, 1–0) | Ukraine | Dumfries Ice Bowl; Attendance: 190 |

Game reference
| Antoine Bonvalot | Goalies | Eduard Zakharchenko | Referee: (Switzerland) Daniel Wirth; Linesmen: (United Kingdom) Andrew Dalton (Canada) Nathan Van Oosten |
| M. Bouvet (L. Bogdanoff, G. Leclerc) (PP2) – 13:20 / 1–0; F. Douay – 47:20 / 2–0 | | | Referee: (Switzerland) Daniel Wirth; Linesmen: (United Kingdom) Andrew Dalton (Canada) Nathan Van Oosten |
| 14 min | Penalties | 16 min | Referee: (Switzerland) Daniel Wirth; Linesmen: (United Kingdom) Andrew Dalton (Canada) Nathan Van Oosten |
| 20 | Shots | 32 | Referee: (Switzerland) Daniel Wirth; Linesmen: (United Kingdom) Andrew Dalton (Canada) Nathan Van Oosten |

| 10 December 2013; 20:00 | Kazakhstan | 6–1 (1–0, 3–1, 2–0) | Great Britain | Dumfries Ice Bowl; Attendance: 525 |

Game reference

Yuri Volosenko
Goalies
Adam Goss
Referee:
(United States) Brett Sheva
Linesmen:
(Denmark) Morten Agertoft
(Slovenia) Damir Rakovic

| Y. Sergiyenko (S. Koshelev, K. Savitsky) (PP2) – 11:18 | 1–0 |
| K. Savitsky (D. Grents, V. Mezhebitski) – 24:21 | 2–0 |
| | 2–1 | 26:47 – Cownie (L. Hook, B. Chamberlain) |
| Y. Sergienko (S. Koshelev, K. Savitsky) (PP) – 30:59 | 3–1 |
| K. Savitsky (Y. Sergiyenko, S. Koshelev) (PP) – 39:24 | 4–1 |
| A. Shestakov (K. Savitsky, Y. Sergiyenko) (PP) – 46:52 | 5–1 |
| N. Kabiev (M. Ibraibekov) (PP) – 59:29 | 6–1 |

14 min
Penalties
22 min
43
Shots
19

| 12 December 2013; 13:00 | Japan | 2–3 (0–2, 0–1, 2–0) | Ukraine | Dumfries Ice Bowl; Attendance: 580 |

Game reference

Akira Sasaki
Goalies
Eduard Zakharchenko
Referee:
(Switzerland) Daniel Wirth
Linesmen:
(Denmark) Morten Agertoft
(Canada) Nathan Van Oosten

| | 0–1 | 03:07 – V. Lyalka (M. Martyshko, V. Zakharov) |
| | 0–2 | 18:17 – Y. Petrangovsky (V. Cherdak) |
| | 0–3 | 29:27 – V. Lyalka (A. Boikov) |
| J. Hashimoto (Y. Miura, Y. Hikosaka) (PP) – 55:46 | 1–3 |
| K. Kawamura (Y. Miura, S. Hitosato) (PP) – 59:40 | 2–3 |

12 min
Penalties
8 min
24
Shots
46

| 12 December 2013; 16:30 | Kazakhstan | 3–4 (1–0, 0–1, 2–3) | Italy | Dumfries Ice Bowl; Attendance: 330 |

Game reference

Valeri Sevidov
Goalies
Martin Rabanser
Daniel Morandell
Referee:
(Hungary) Gergely Kincses
Linesmen:
(United Kingdom) Andrew Dalton
(Slovenia) Damir Rakovic

| Y. Sergienko (K. Savitsky, S. Koshelev) – 16:23 | 1–0 |
| | 1–1 | 29:40 – O. Schenk (L. Mattivi, R. Lacedelli) |
| | 1–2 | 40:59 – G. Morini (T. Terzago, P. Morini) |
| Y. Sergienko (Alexandrov, K. Savitsky) (PP) – 43:33 | 2–2 |
| | 2–3 | 46:51 – O. Schenk (R. Lacedelli) (PP) |
| | 2–4 | 52:21 – A. Alber (J. Ramoser) |
| D. Fisenko (A. Likhotnikov) – 55:21 | 3–4 |

31 min
Penalties
43 min
40
Shots
21

| 12 December 2013; 20:00 | France | 4–5 GWS (1–2, 1–0, 2–2) (OT: 0–0) (SO: 0–1) | Great Britain | Dumfries Ice Bowl; Attendance: 580 |

Game reference

Tom Aubrun
Goalies
Adam Goss
Referee:
(Finland) Stefan Fonselius
Linesmen:
(Latvia) Maksims Bogdanovs
(Belarus) Vasili Kaliada

| | 0–1 | 02:13 – L. Stewart (R. Venus) |
| J. Perret (C. di Dio Balsamo) – 02:49 | 1–1 |
| | 1–2 | 15:59 – O. Betteridge (S. Duggan) |
| J. Laplace (J. Perret, P. Crinon) – 33:44 | 2–2 |
| G. Leclerc (M. Bouvet) (PP) – 51:18 | 3–2 |
| | 3–3 | 51:54 – R. Venus (S. Mackie, L. Stewart) |
| | 3–4 | 57:37 – L. Morris |
| J. Perret (H. Gallet) – 58:10 | 4–4 |

Lou Bogdanoff (miss)
Roman Carpentier
J. Laplace (miss)
Shootout
Jordan Cownie
R. Venus
8 min
Penalties
6 min
25
Shots
24

| 14 December 2013; 13:00 | Italy | 4–3 OT (0–0, 2–2, 1–1); OT: (1–0) | France | Dumfries Ice Bowl; Attendance: 230 |

Game reference

Martin Rabanser
Goalies
Antoine Bonvalot
Referee:
(United States) Brett Sheva
Linesmen:
(United Kingdom) Andrew Dalton
(Canada) Nathan Vanoosten

| M. Marchetti (L. Mattivi) – 21:30 | 1–0 |
| | 1–1 | 26:43 – C. di Dio Balsamo (P. Crinon) |
| | 1–2 | 31:09 – G. Leclerc (L. Bogdanoff, Saint Andre)(PP) |
| T. Terzago (P. Hochkofler, J. Pavlu) – 31:26 | 2–2 |
| | 2–3 | 49:33 – C. di Dio Balsamo (G. Leclerc, Q. Scolari)(SH) |
| G. Morini (PP) – 55:20 | 3–3 |
| G. Morini (A. Radin) – 61:02 | 4–3 |

10 min
Penalties
8 min
25
Shots
35

| 14 December 2013; 16:30 | Kazakhstan | 8–7 (1–1, 3–5, 4–1) | Japan | Dumfries Ice Bowl; Attendance: 245 |

Game reference

Yuri Volosenko
Valeri Sevidov
Goalies
Keisuke Maekita
Akira Sasaki
Referee:
(Finland) Stefan Fonselius
Linesmen:
(Latvia) Maksims Bogdanovs
(United Kingdom) Scott Dalglesish

| A. Shestakov (N. Mikhailis) – 03:35 | 1–0 |
| | 1–1 | 08:50 – K. Suzuki (K. Kido, K. Matsukane) (PP) |
| | 1–2 | 20:22 – S. Hitosato (K. Kawamura) |
| N. Mikhailis (M. Ibraibekov) – 21:08 | 2–2 |
| | 2–3 | 25:21 – Y. Hikosaka (S. Takagi) |
| | 2–4 | 33:28 – S. Hitosato (PP) |
| S. Koshelev (Y. Sergienko) (PP) – 35:04 | 3–4 |
| | 3–5 | 35:57 – S. Kudo (J. Hashimoto, S. Namioka) |
| | 3–6 | 37:32 – K. Kido (PP) |
| Y. Sergienko (N. Mikhailis) – 39:07 | 4–6 |
| N. Mikhailis (I. Stepanenko) – 44:55 | 5–6 |
| N. Mikhailis (I. Stepanenko) – 51:04 | 6–6 |
| Y. Sergienko (S. Koshelev, K. Savitski) (PP) – 55:17 | 7–6 |
| S. Koshelev (SH)(EN) – 59:09 | 8–6 |
| | 8–7 | 59:31 – R. Matsumoto (Y. Miura) |

28 min
Penalties
16 min
44
Shots
24

| 14 December 2013; 20:00 | Ukraine | 4–0 (1–0, 1–0, 2–0) | Great Britain | Dumfries Ice Bowl; Attendance: 610 |

Game reference

Eduard Zakharchenko
Goalies
Adam Goss
Referee:
(Hungary) Gergely Kincses
Linesmen:
(Belarus) Vasili Kaliada
(Slovenia) Damir Rakovic

| M. Martyshko (V. Varyvoda) – 10:28 | 1–0 |
| V. Zakharov (M. Martyshko, O. Komarchev) – 36:08 | 2–0 |
| V. Cherdak (Y. Petrangovsky, V. Kutsevych) – 42:21 | 3–0 |
| Y. Petrangovsky (V. Kutsevych) – 49:29 | 4–0 |

4 min
Penalties
14 min
40
Shots
20

| 15 December 2013; 13:00 | France | 2–4 (1–1, 1–2, 0–1) | Kazakhstan | Dumfries Ice Bowl; Attendance: 250 |

Game reference

Antoine Bonvalot
Goalies
Valeri Sevidov
Referee:
(United States) Brett Sheva
Linesmen:
(United Kingdom) Scott Dalgleish
(United Kingdom) Andrew Dalton

| J. Perret (F. Douay, K. Bozon) (PP) – 00:57 | 1–0 |
| | 1–1 | 13:36 – D. Grents (N. Mikhailis, A. Shestakov) |
| 21:47 – F. Douay (K. Bozon) | 2–1 |
| | 2–2 | 26:51 – K. Savitsky (A. Shestakov, S. Alexandrov) (SH) |
| | 2–3 | 34:13 – Y. Sergiyenko (S. Koshelev) |
| | 2–4 | 52:39 – I.Kinstler |

26 min
Penalties
45 min
24
Shots
34

| 15 December 2013; 16:30 | Italy | 4–2 (1–1, 2–1, 1–0) | Ukraine | Dumfries Ice Bowl; Attendance: 234 |

Game reference

Martin Rabanser
Goalies
Eduard Zakharchenko
Referee:
(Hungary) Gergely Kincses
Linesmen:
(Slovenia) Damir Rakovic
(Canada) Nathan Vanoosten

| G. Morini (P. Morini, D. Glira) – 06:28 | 1–0 |
| | 1–1 | 10:17 – V. Sirchenko (V. Cherdak) (PP) |
| | 1–2 | 29:28 – I. Pidgursky (S. Kuzmik) |
| P. Hochkofler (J. Pavlu, T. Terzago) (PP) – 35:59 | 2–2 |
| J. Ramoser (P. Hochkofler, J. Pavlu) – 38:07 | 3–2 |
| T. Terzago (F. Pace, D. Glira) – 43:18 | 4–2 |

6 min
Penalties
6 min
27
Shots
27

| 15 December 2013; 20:00 | Great Britain | 4–2 (1–0, 2–2, 1–0) | Japan | Dumfries Ice Bowl; Attendance: 530 |

Game reference

Adam Goss
Goalies
Akira Sasaki

| F. Taylor (J. Cownie, S. Godfrey) – 13:29 | 1–0 |
| | 1–1 | 25:05 – K. Suzuki (Y. Aoki) |
| | 1–2 | 25:51 – R. Kaneko (Y. Hikosaka) |
| B. Chamberlain (J. Cownie) – 31:22 | 2–2 |
| L. Hook (J. Cownie, B. Chamberlain) – 35:04 | 3–2 |
| L. Stewart (R. Venus, S. Mackie) (EN) – 59:55 | 4–2 |

8 min
Penalties
6 min
25
Shots
32

=== Statistics ===
==== Top 10 scorers ====
| Pos | Player | Country | GP | G | A | Pts | +/- | PIM |
|---|---|---|---|---|---|---|---|---|
| 1 | Nikita Mikhailis | Kazakhstan | 5 | 6 | 5 | 11 | +7 | 0 |
| 2 | Yuri Sergiyenko | Kazakhstan | 5 | 7 | 3 | 10 | +4 | 0 |
| 3 | Kirill Savitski | Kazakhstan | 5 | 3 | 7 | 10 | +2 | 10 |
| 4 | Semyon Koshelev | Kazakhstan | 5 | 3 | 6 | 9 | +3 | 0 |
| 5 | Giovanni Morini | Italy | 5 | 4 | 2 | 6 | +4 | 4 |
| 6 | Tommaso Terzago | Italy | 5 | 3 | 3 | 6 | +2 | 2 |
| 7 | Jordan Cownie | Great Britain | 5 | 2 | 4 | 6 | +1 | 2 |
| 8 | Joachim Ramoser | Italy | 5 | 4 | 1 | 5 | +5 | 4 |
| 9 | Ivan Kinstler | Kazakhstan | 5 | 3 | 2 | 5 | +3 | 6 |
| 10 | Yu Hikosaka | Japan | 5 | 2 | 3 | 5 | -2 | 6 |
| 10 | Ross Venus | Great Britain | 5 | 2 | 3 | 5 | -2 | 0 |

==== Goaltending leaders ====
(minimum 40% team's total ice time)

| Pos | Player | Country | MINS | GA | Sv% | GAA | SO |
|---|---|---|---|---|---|---|---|
| 1 | Martin Rasbanser | Italy | 241:30 | 11 | 91.54 | 2.73 | 0 |
| 2 | Eduard Zakharchenko | Ukraine | 280:00 | 11 | 91.06 | 2.36 | 1 |
| 3 | Akira Sasaki | Japan | 191:17 | 12 | 90.77 | 3.76 | 0 |
| 4 | Antoine Bonvalot | France | 241:02 | 11 | 89.32 | 2.74 | 1 |
| 5 | Valeri Sevidor | Kazakhstan | 191:02 | 11 | 88.17 | 3.45 | 0 |

=== Awards ===
==== Best Players Selected by the Directorate ====
- Goaltender: (Italy) Martin Rasbanser
- Defenceman: (Kazakhstan) Yuri Sergiyenko
- Forward: (Kazakhstan) Kirill Savitski

==== Best players of each team selected by the coaches ====
- (France) Cedric di Dio Balsamo
- (United Kingdom) Adam Goss
- (Italy) Martin Rasbanser
- (Japan) Keita Kido
- (Kazakhstan) Yuri Sergiyenko
- (Ukraine) Eduard Zakharchenko
