= 2021–22 Belarusian Extraliga season =

Ice hockey season

2021–22 Extraliga
- League: Extraliga
- Sport: Ice hockey
- Duration: 31 August 2021 – 25 April 2022
- Teams: 12

Regular season
- Best record: Yunost Minsk
- Runners-up: Metallurg Zhlobin

Playoffs

Finals
- Champions: Metallurg Zhlobin (2nd title)
- Runners-up: Yunost Minsk

Belarusian Extraliga seasons
- ← 2020–21 2022–23 →

The 2021–22 Belarusian Extraliga season was the 30th season of the Belarusian Extraliga, the top level of ice hockey in Belarus. Twelve teams participated in the league.

== Regular season ==
=== First round ===
Pos	Team	Pld	W	OTW	OTL	L	GF	GA	GD	Pts	Qualification
1	Yunost Minsk	44	26	5	7	6	119	75	+44	69	Advance to Second Round Group A
2	Metallurg Zhlobin	44	19	10	6	9	140	101	+39	64	Advance to Second Round Group A
3	HK Gomel	44	23	5	6	10	134	96	+38	62	Advance to Second Round Group A
4	Shakhtyor Soligorsk	44	21	8	3	12	123	87	+36	61	Advance to Second Round Group A
5	HK Vitebsk	44	17	8	8	11	107	100	+7	58	Advance to Second Round Group A
6	Neman Grodno	44	18	4	5	17	119	94	+25	49	Advance to Second Round Group A
7	Dinamo-Molodechno	44	19	3	4	18	104	116	−12	48	Advance to Second Round Group B
8	Khimik-SKA Novopolotsk	44	12	8	6	18	82	89	−7	46	Advance to Second Round Group B
9	HK Lokomotiv Orsha	44	14	5	7	18	92	91	+1	45	Advance to Second Round Group B
10	HK Brest	44	10	4	7	23	75	121	−46	35	Advance to Second Round Group B
11	HK Mogilev	44	9	5	5	25	54	107	−53	33	Advance to Second Round Group B
12	HK Lida	44	7	4	5	28	77	149	−72	27	Advance to Second Round Group B

Source: hockey.by
Rules for classification: 1) Points; 2) Head-to-head points.

=== Second round ===
==== Group A ====
Pos	Team	Pld	W	OTW	OTL	L	GF	GA	GD	Pts	Qualification
1	Yunost Minsk	54	31	9	7	7	156	99	+57	87	Advance to play-offs
2	Metallurg Zhlobin	54	25	12	7	10	174	120	+54	81	Advance to play-offs
3	HK Gomel	54	25	7	7	15	152	126	+26	71	Advance to play-offs
4	Shakhtyor Soligorsk	54	23	9	5	17	142	117	+25	69	Advance to play-offs
5	HK Vitebsk	54	21	8	10	15	134	124	+10	68	Advance to play-offs
6	Neman Grodno	54	20	4	8	22	137	120	+17	56	Advance to play-offs

Source: hockey.by
Rules for classification: 1) Points; 2) Head-to-head points.

==== Group B ====
Pos	Team	Pld	W	OTW	OTL	L	GF	GA	GD	Pts	Qualification
1	Dinamo-Molodechno	54	24	5	6	19	133	138	−5	64	Advance to qualification round
2	Khimik-SKA Novopolotsk	54	16	12	6	20	107	103	+4	62	Advance to qualification round
3	HK Lokomotiv Orsha	54	20	6	8	20	116	106	+10	60	Advance to qualification round
4	HK Brest	54	12	6	9	27	98	147	−49	45	Advance to qualification round
5	HK Mogilev	54	12	5	8	29	70	130	−60	42	
6	HK Lida	54	7	5	7	35	103	192	−89	31	

Source: hockey.by
Rules for classification: 1) Points; 2) Head-to-head points.

=== Statistics ===
==== Scoring leaders ====
The following shows the top ten players who led the league in points, at the conclusion of matches played on 20 February 2022.

Player	Team	GP	G	A	Pts	+/–	PIM
(Russia) Alexei Mikhnov	Metallurg Zhlobin	51	27	26	53	+25	37
(Russia) Aleksandr Timiryov	Metallurg Zhlobin	51	29	22	51	+19	14
(Russia) Stanislav Kuchkin	HK Gomel	46	23	28	51	+23	48
(Russia) Alexei Mastryukov	Metallurg Zhlobin	49	18	16	44	+23	14
(Russia) Denis Kuzmin	HK Vitebsk	50	14	27	41	+30	42
(Russia) Pavel Kopytin	Dinamo-Molodechno	45	15	25	40	-3	49
(Belarus) Nikita Remezov	Neman Grodno	38	14	26	40	+9	12
(Russia) Andrei Feklistov	Shakhtyor Soligorsk	52	18	21	39	+6	25
(Russia) Evgeniy Grigorenko	HK Gomel	45	19	19	38	+21	8
(Belarus) Pavel Razvadovski	HK Gomel	51	19	18	37	+17	45

=== Leading goaltenders ===
The following shows the top ten goaltenders who led the league in goals against average, provided that they have played at least 40% of their team's minutes, at the conclusion of matches played on 7 October 2021.

Player	Team	GP	TOI	W	L	GA	SO	Sv%	GAA
(Russia) Aleksandr Samoylov	Metallurg Zhlobin	13	794:00	11	2	24	2	1.81	94
(Russia) Sergey Bronnikov	HK Brest	11	589:00	4	7	21	0	2.14	94
(Belarus) Nikita Mytnik	Yunost Minsk	13	783:00	5	8	35	0	2.68	90
(Russia) Artur Malkov	HK Mogilev	12	679:00	3	9	20	2	1.77	93
(Belarus) Mikhail Karnaukhov	Dinamo-Molodechno	11	621:00	6	5	22	4	2.13	92
(Belarus) Konstantin Kozlovsky	HK Lida	12	568:00	5	7	29	2	3.06	90
(Belarus) Aleksey Merzlov	HK Lokomotiv Orsha	7	426:00	3	4	13	1	1.83	94
(Belarus) Stepan Goryachevskikh	Khimik-SKA Novopolotsk	8	484:00	4	4	8	3	0.99	96
(Belarus) Rostislav Zinovenko	Yunost Minsk	10	606:00	7	3	13	2	1.29	94
(Belarus) Maxim Malyutin	Neman Grodno	9	482:00	3	6	17	1	2.12	92

== Playoffs ==
=== Bracket ===
Qualification round (best-of-3)
7	Dinamo-Molodechno	2
10	HK Brest	0
8	Khimik-SKA Novopolotsk	2
9	HK Lokomotiv Orsha	1

Quarter-finals (best-of-7)
1	Yunost Minsk	4
8	Khimik-SKA Novopolotsk	2
2	Metallurg Zhlobin	4
7	Dinamo-Molodechno	0
3	HK Gomel	1
6	Neman Grodno	4
4	Shakhtyor Soligorsk	4
5	HK Vitebsk	0

Semi-finals (best-of-7)
1	Yunost Minsk	4
6	Neman Grodno	2
(Pairings are re-seeded after the first and second round)
2	Metallurg Zhlobin	4
4	Shakhtyor Soligorsk	3

Finals (best-of-7)
1	Yunost Minsk	3
2	Metallurg Zhlobin	4

=== Qualification round ===
Dinamo-Molodechno – HK Brest 2–0
2022-02-27	Dinamo-Molodechno	HK Brest	1-0
2022-03-01	HK Brest	Dinamo-Molodechno	1-2
Dinamo-Molodechno won the series 2–0

Khimik-SKA Novopolotsk – HK Lokomotiv Orsha 2–1
2022-02-28	Khimik-SKA Novopolotsk	HK Lokomotiv Orsha	3-1
2022-03-02	HK Lokomotiv Orsha	Khimik-SKA Novopolotsk	3-2 OT
2022-03-04	HK Lokomotiv Orsha	Khimik-SKA Novopolotsk	0-2
Khimik-SKA Novopolotsk won the series 2–1

=== Quarterfinals ===
Yunost Minsk – Khimik-SKA Novopolotsk 4-2
2022-03-09	Yunost Minsk	Khimik-SKA Novopolotsk	2-0
2022-03-11	Yunost Minsk	Khimik-SKA Novopolotsk	0-2
2022-03-13	Khimik-SKA Novopolotsk	Yunost Minsk	1-2
2022-03-15	Khimik-SKA Novopolotsk	Yunost Minsk	3-4
2022-03-17	Yunost Minsk	Khimik-SKA Novopolotsk	1-4
2022-03-19	Khimik-SKA Novopolotsk	Yunost Minsk	1-4
Yunost Minsk won the series 4–2

HK Gomel – Neman Grodno 4-1
2022-03-10	HK Gomel	Neman Grodno	2-3
2022-03-12	HK Gomel	Neman Grodno	2-1
2022-03-14	Neman Grodno	HK Gomel	2-0
2022-03-16	Neman Grodno	HK Gomel	2-1
2022-03-18	HK Gomel	Neman Grodno	2-3
Neman Grodno won the series 4–1

Metallurg Zhlobin – Dinamo-Molodechno 4-0
2022-03-10	Metallurg Zhlobin	Dinamo-Molodechno	5-2
2022-03-12	Metallurg Zhlobin	Dinamo-Molodechno	3-1
2022-03-14	Dinamo-Molodechno	Metallurg Zhlobin	1-6
2022-03-16	Dinamo-Molodechno	Metallurg Zhlobin	1-2
Metallurg Zhlobin won the series 4–0

Shakhtyor Soligorsk – HK Vitebsk 4-0
2022-03-09	Shakhtyor Soligorsk	HK Vitebsk	3-1 OT
2022-03-11	Shakhtyor Soligorsk	HK Vitebsk	4-0
2022-03-13	HK Vitebsk	Shakhtyor Soligorsk	4-5
2022-03-15	HK Vitebsk	Shakhtyor Soligorsk	0-3
Shakhtyor Soligorsk won the series 4–0

=== Semifinals ===
Yunost Minsk – Neman Grodno 4-2
2022-03-26	Yunost Minsk	Neman Grodno	4-1
2022-03-28	Yunost Minsk	Neman Grodno	2-0
2022-03-30	Neman Grodno	Yunost Minsk	2-1 OT2
2022-04-01	Neman Grodno	Yunost Minsk	0-4
2022-04-03	Yunost Minsk	Neman Grodno	3-4 OT2
2022-04-05	Neman Grodno	Yunost Minsk	2-3
Yunost Minsk won the series 4–2

Metallurg Zhlobin – Shakhtyor Soligorsk 4-3
2022-03-27	Metallurg Zhlobin	Shakhtyor Soligorsk	7-4
2022-03-29	Metallurg Zhlobin	Shakhtyor Soligorsk	2-3 OT
2022-03-31	Shakhtyor Soligorsk	Metallurg Zhlobin	4-2
2022-04-02	Shakhtyor Soligorsk	Metallurg Zhlobin	1-3
2022-04-04	Metallurg Zhlobin	Shakhtyor Soligorsk	4-0
2022-04-06	Shakhtyor Soligorsk	Metallurg Zhlobin	3-2
2022-04-08	Metallurg Zhlobin	Shakhtyor Soligorsk	5-0
Metallurg Zhlobin won the series 4–3

=== Finals ===
13 April 2022; 19:25 (UTC+3)	Yunost Minsk	2–1 (1–0, 1–1, 0–0) score in the series: 1–0	Metallurg Zhlobin	Chizhovka-Arena, Minsk; Attendance: 1,555

Game reference

Leonid Fomin
Goalies
Aleksandr Samoylov
Referees:
Maxim Sidorenko
Pavel Osmolovskiy
Linesmen:
Pavel Badyl
Dmitriy Golyak

Palchik (Vinogradov) - 05:02	1–0
Andryushchenko (Drozd) - 22:05	2–0
	2–1	29:41 - Maslennikov (Suvorov, Pinchuk)

0 min
Penalties
6 min
38
Shots
28

15 April 2022; 19:25 (UTC+3)	Yunost Minsk	4–3 OT (1–0, 2–2, 0–1) (OT: 1–0) score in the series: 2–0	Metallurg Zhlobin	Chizhovka-Arena, Minsk; Attendance: 3,300

Game reference

Leonid Fomin
Goalies
Aleksandr Samoylov
Referees:
Viktor Plyats
Andrei Shrubok
Linesmen:
Artyom Labzov
Nikita Polyakov

Pavlovich (Antonov) (PP1) - 08:29	1–0
	1–1	22:25 - Pinchuk
Demchenko (Gaynetdinov, Antonov) (PP1) - 30:33	2–1
	2–2	37:29 - Kislyy (Mastryukov, Voronov) (PP1)
Brikun (Pavlovich, Antonov) (PP1) - 39:02	3–2
	3–3	45:32 - Kislyy (Gabrus, Mastryukov)
Palchik - 81:51	4–3

39 min
Penalties
37 min
51
Shots
39

17 April 2022; 18:00 (UTC+3)	Metallurg Zhlobin	6–5 (1–0, 3–1, 2–4) score in the series: 1–2	Yunost Minsk	Ice Palace Metalurg, Zhlobin; Attendance: 2,000

Game reference

Aleksandr Samoylov
Goalies
Leonid Fomin
Rostislav Zinovenko
Referees:
Vladimir Nalivayko
Pyotr Amosov
Linesmen:
Roman Akulov
Dmitriy Pashik

Voytekhov (Pinchuk, Kuznetsov) (PP1) - 09:23	1–0
Pinchuk (Kuznetsov, Gabrus) - 20:53	2–0
	2–1	27:14 - Raisov (Pavlenko, Kitarov)
Volchenkov (Voytekhov) - 27:59	3–1
A. Gavrus (Timirev, Mastryukov) - 38:49	4–1
	4–2	41:24 - Pavlovich (Gaynetdinov) (PP1)
Kislyy (Volchenkov) (PP1) - 45:58	5–2
A. Gavrus (Mastryukov, Kupchikhin) - 48:25	6–2
	6–3	49:32 - Shchechin (Pavlenko)
	6–4	55:32 - Pavlovich (Demchenko, Andryshchenko) (PP1)
	6–5	59:22 - Raisov (Andryshchenko, Kashkar)

37 min
Penalties
14 min
31
Shots
36

19 April 2022; 18:55 (UTC+3)	Metallurg Zhlobin	4–3 (1–1, 2–0, 1–2) score in the series: 2–2	Yunost Minsk	Ice Palace Metalurg, Zhlobin; Attendance: 2,000

Game reference

Aleksandr Samoylov
Goalies
Leonid Fomin
Referees:
Yevgeniy Goncharov
Maxim Sidorenko
Linesmen:
Dmitriy Golyak
Roman Chizhevskiy

Mastryukov - 00:30	1–0
	1–1	02:16 - Antonov (Brikun) (PP1)
Kuznetsov (Suvorov, Volchenkov) (PP1) - 23:43	2–1
Kislyy (Mastryukov, Timirev) (PP1) - 27:09	3–1
	3–2	45:51 - Kitarov
Solomonov (Kuznetsov) - 58:25	4–2
	4–3	58:50 - Raisov (Gaynetdinov)

4 min
Penalties
10 min
37
Shots
38

21 April 2022; 18:55 (UTC+3)	Yunost Minsk	3–2 OT (0–1, 1–0, 1–1) (OT: 1–0) score in the series: 3–2	Metallurg Zhlobin	Chizhovka-Arena, Minsk; Attendance: 3,800

Game reference

Leonid Fomin
Rostislav Zinovenko
Goalies
Aleksandr Samoylov
Referees:
Vasiliy Koleda
Viktor Plyats
Linesmen:
Nikita Polyakov
Kirill Shenko

	0–1	08:36 - Pinchuk (Mokrushev)
Vozovik - 22:05	1–1
	1–2	42:47 - A. Gavrus
Vinogradov (Gaynetdinov, Kitarov) - 57:01	2–2
Pavlenko (Raisov) (PP1) - 73:27	3–2

39 min
Penalties
6 min
31
Shots
36

23 April 2022; 16:55 (UTC+3)	Metallurg Zhlobin	3–2 (1–1, 1–0, 1–1) score in the series: 3–3	Yunost Minsk	Ice Palace Metalurg, Zhlobin; Attendance: 2,200

Game reference

Aleksandr Samoylov
Goalies
Leonid Fomin
Referees:
Pavel Osmolovskiy
Viktor Plyats
Linesmen:
Artyom Labzov
Dmitriy Pashik

	0–1	05:26 - Demchenko (Pavlovich) (PP1)
Pinchuk (Mokrushev, Samoylov) (PP1) - 12:59	1–1
Suvorov (Pinchuk, Volchenkov) (PP1) - 39:49	2–1
	2–2	42:26 - Rovba (Vinogradov, Pavlovich)
Suvorov - 49:05	3–2

11 min
Penalties
10 min
34
Shots
21

25 April 2022; 18:55 (UTC+3)	Yunost Minsk	0–3 (0–1, 0–1, 0–1) score in the series: 3–4	Metallurg Zhlobin	Minsk-Arena, Minsk; Attendance: 15,086

Game reference

Leonid Fomin
Goalies
Aleksandr Samoylov
Referees:
Maxim Sidorenko
Viktor Plyats
Linesmen:
Roman Akulov
Dmitriy Golyak

0–1	06:17 - Kuznetsov (Volchenkov)
0–2	26:20 - Kuznetsov (Pinchuk, Volchenkov)
0–3	58:36 - Solomonov (Mastryukov, Volchenkov) (PP1)

35 min
Penalties
8 min
31
Shots
37

== Final rankings ==
Gold medal	Metallurg Zhlobin
Silver medal	Yunost Minsk
Bronze medal	Shakhtyor Soligorsk
4	Neman Grodno
5	HK Gomel
6	HK Vitebsk
7	Dinamo-Molodechno
8	Khimik-SKA Novopolotsk
9	HK Lokomotiv Orsha
10	HK Brest
11	HK Mogilev
12	HK Lida
