= Malyutin =

Malyutin (masculine, Russian: Малютин) or Malyutina (feminine, Russian: Малютина) is a Russian surname. Notable people with the surname include:

- Maxim Malyutin (born 1988), Belarusian ice hockey player
- Sergey Malyutin (1859–1937), Russian architect, painter, and stage designer
