= Karnaukhov =

Karnaukhov (masculine, Belarusian: Карнаухаў, Russian: Карнаухов) or Karnaukhova (feminine, Belarusian: Карнаухава, Russian: Карнаухова) is a Russian surname. Notable people with the surname include:

- Mikhail Karnaukhov (born 1994), Belarusian ice hockey player
- Pavel Karnaukhov (born 1997), Russian ice hockey player
- Valentina Vasilyevna Karnaukhova (born 2001), Russian video blogger, TikTok personality, singer, and actress
