= Kogalev =

Kogalev is a surname. Notable people with the surname include:

- Alexander Kogalev (born 1994), Belarusian ice hockey player
- Alexei Kogalev (born 1966), Belgian diver
