= Yevgeni Lisovets =

Belarusian ice hockey player

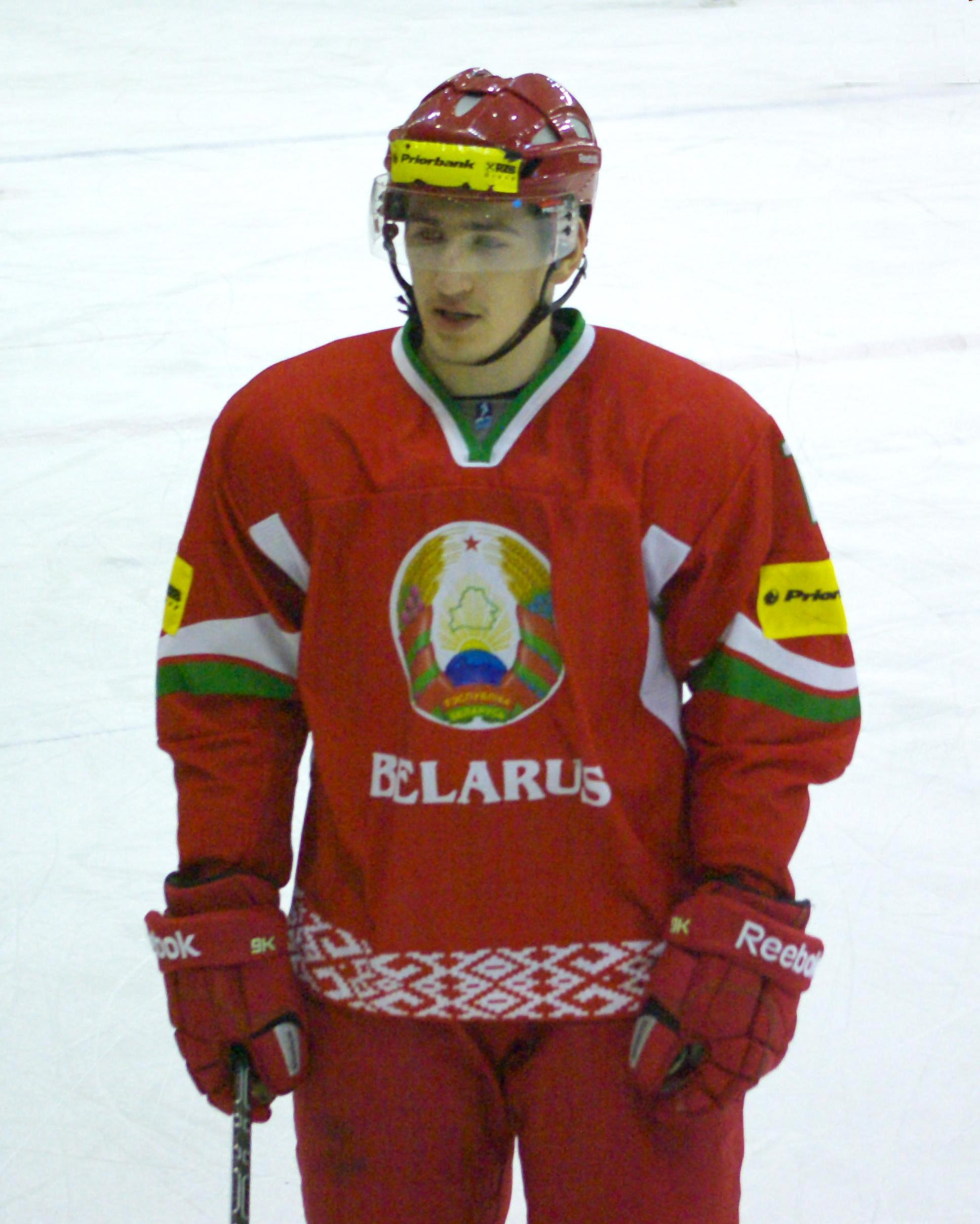
- Born: 12 November 1994 (age 31) Grodno, Belarus
- Height: 5 ft 11 in (180 cm)
- Weight: 212 lb (96 kg; 15 st 2 lb)
- Position: Defence
- Shoots: Left
- BHL team Former teams: HC Neman Grodno; Dinamo Minsk; Salavat Yulaev Ufa; HC Vityaz; Admiral Vladivostok
- National team: Belarus
- Playing career: 2009–present

Yevgeni Lisovets (born 12 November 1994) is a Belarusian professional ice hockey defenceman. He is currently playing for HC Neman Grodno of the Belarusian Extraleague and the Belarus men's national ice hockey team.

== Playing career ==
Lisovets began his third season with Salavat Yulaev Ufa in the 2021–22 campaign, posting 1 goals and 2 points through 18 games before he was traded to HC Vityaz in exchange for Viktor Antipin on 19 November 2021.

On 11 June 2022, Lisovets left Podolsk as a free agent and signed a one-year contract with his fourth KHL club, Admiral Vladivostok.

== International play ==
Lisovets was named to the Belarus men's national ice hockey team for the 2015 IIHF World Championship. Lisovets also played in the Spengler Cup in 2019-2020 for Salavat Yulaev Ufa of the KHL.

== Career statistics ==
=== Regular season and playoffs ===
			Regular season					Playoffs
Season	Team	League	GP	G	A	Pts	PIM	GP	G	A	Pts	PIM
2009–10	Neman Grodno-2	BVL	40	4	6	10	32	—	—	—	—	—
2010–11	Neman Grodno-2	BVL	36	8	9	17	48	—	—	—	—	—
2011–12	Dinamo-Shinnik Bobruysk	MHL	30	2	1	3	20	2	1	0	1	0
2012–13	Neman Grodno-2	BVL	7	2	3	5	10	5	1	1	2	6
2012–13	Neman Grodno	BXL	38	9	6	15	26	11	0	5	5	2
2013–14	Dinamo Minsk	KHL	4	0	0	0	0	—	—	—	—	—
2013–14	Dinamo-Shinnik Bobruisk	MHL	4	0	0	0	6	—	—	—	—	—
2013–14	Neman Grodno	BXL	29	2	4	6	16	14	3	3	6	10
2013–14	Neman Grodno-2	BVL	1	0	0	0	0	—	—	—	—	—
2014–15	Dinamo Minsk	KHL	60	0	1	1	28	5	0	0	0	0
2015–16	Dinamo Minsk	KHL	55	2	3	5	22	—	—	—	—	—
2016–17	Dinamo Minsk	KHL	60	7	12	19	55	5	1	0	1	4
2017–18	Dinamo Minsk	KHL	36	4	4	8	26	—	—	—	—	—
2018–19	Dinamo Minsk	KHL	59	7	18	25	26	—	—	—	—	—
2019–20	Salavat Yulaev Ufa	KHL	35	1	3	4	10	1	0	0	0	0
2020–21	Salavat Yulaev Ufa	KHL	36	2	5	7	10	9	0	2	2	2
2021–22	Salavat Yulaev Ufa	KHL	18	1	1	2	11	—	—	—	—	—
2021–22	HC Vityaz	KHL	17	0	1	1	6	—	—	—	—	—
2022–23	Admiral Vladivostok	KHL	51	3	8	11	32	10	2	2	4	6
2023–24	Admiral Vladivostok	KHL	44	2	7	9	8	—	—	—	—	—
KHL totals			475	29	62	91	234	30	3	4	7	12

=== International ===
Year	Team	Event	Result	GP	G	A	Pts	PIM
2011	Belarus	WJC18-D1	16th	5	1	1	2	4
2012	Belarus	WJC18-D1	17th	5	3	2	5	2
2012	Belarus	WJC-D1	12th	5	0	0	0	0
2013	Belarus	WJC-D1	12th	5	1	1	2	4
2014	Belarus	WJC-D1	13th	3	1	3	4	2
2015	Belarus	WC	7th	8	0	2	2	6
2016	Belarus	WC	12th	7	0	4	4	2
2016	Belarus	OGQ	DNQ	3	0	1	1	0
2017	Belarus	WC	13th	7	2	1	3	6
2018	Belarus	WC	15th	7	0	0	0	4
2019	Belarus	WC-D1	18th	5	1	2	3	0
2021	Belarus	WC	15th	4	0	0	0	4
2021	Belarus	OGQ	DNQ	3	0	0	0	0
Junior totals				23	6	7	13	12
Senior totals				44	3	10	13	22
