= Matthias Asperup =

Danish ice hockey player (born 1995)

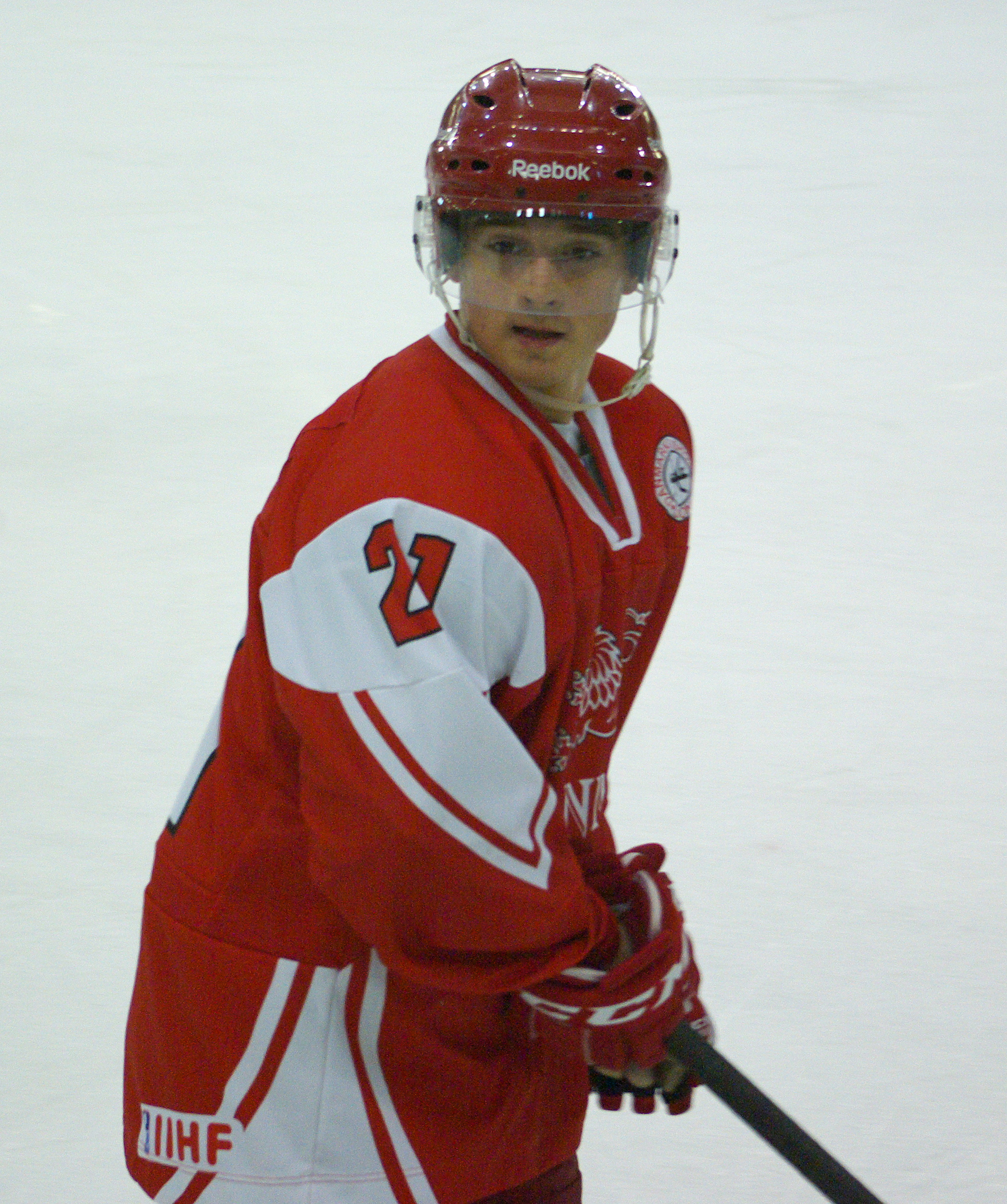
- Asperup representing Denmark at the 2013 World Junior Championship D1A
- Born: 3 March 1995 (age 31) Søborg, Denmark
- Height: 1.82 m (6 ft 0 in)
- Weight: 84 kg (185 lb; 13 st 3 lb)
- Position: Left/Right wing
- Shoots: Left
- Metal team Former teams: Herlev Eagles; Copenhagen Hockey; Rødovre Mighty Bulls; Gentofte Stars
- National team: Denmark
- Playing career: 2012–present

Matthias Martini Asperup (born 3 March 1995) is a Danish ice hockey player for the Herlev Eagles in the Metal Ligaen (DEN) and the Danish national team.

He represented Denmark at the 2021 IIHF World Championship.

His elder sister, Josephine, is also an ice hockey player and represented Denmark at the 2021 IIHF Women's World Championship.

== Career statistics ==
=== Regular season and playoffs ===
			Regular season					Playoffs
Season	Team	League	GP	G	A	Pts	PIM	GP	G	A	Pts	PIM
2009–10	Rødovre Mighty Bulls	DEN U17	16	15	20	35	6	—	—	—	—	—
2010–11	Rødovre Mighty Bulls	DEN U17	14	20	19	39	65	—	—	—	—	—
2010–11	Gladsaxe/Rødovre	DEN U20	2	1	2	3	16	—	—	—	—	—
2010–11	Rødovre Mighty Bulls	DEN U20	10	7	5	12	20	5	3	0	3	0
2010–11	Rødovre Mighty Bulls II	DEN.2	4	1	2	3	0	13	6	6	12	12
2011–12	Frölunda HC	J18	21	6	11	17	20	—	—	—	—	—
2011–12	Frölunda HC	J18 Allsv	15	6	10	16	6	4	2	1	3	2
2012–13	Copenhagen Hockey	DEN U20	1	0	0	0	0	2	3	2	5	4
2012–13	Hvidovre IK	DEN.2	2	1	2	3	2	5	2	2	4	4
2012–13	Copenhagen Hockey	DEN	38	4	5	9	18	—	—	—	—	—
2013–14	Malmö Redhawks	J20	34	10	17	27	36	2	1	1	2	2
2014–15	Malmö Redhawks	J20	21	5	2	7	10	—	—	—	—	—
2014–15	Rødovre Mighty Bulls	DEN	9	2	1	3	2	5	0	1	1	0
2014–15	Rødovre SIK	DEN.2	—	—	—	—	—	4	6	1	7	4
2015–16	Rødovre Mighty Bulls	DEN	41	13	20	33	37	6	0	5	5	27
2015–16	Rødovre SIK	DEN.2	—	—	—	—	—	4	0	1	1	12
2016–17	Rødovre Mighty Bulls	DEN	33	11	17	28	91	—	—	—	—	—
2016–17	Gentofte Stars	DEN	6	0	1	1	12	17	4	6	10	6
2017–18	Rødovre Mighty Bulls	DEN	47	13	33	46	42	7	1	1	2	12
2018–19	Rødovre Mighty Bulls	DEN	28	11	18	29	39	6	2	1	3	6
2019–20	Rødovre Mighty Bulls	DEN	26	10	12	22	61	—	—	—	—	—
2020–21	Rødovre Mighty Bulls	DEN	8	0	4	4	0	—	—	—	—	—
2020–21	Herlev Eagles	DEN	34	12	23	35	10	4	0	4	4	2
2021–22	Herlev Eagles	DEN	38	15	25	40	6	4	2	0	2	2
2022–23	Herlev Eagles	DEN	43	16	29	45	14	12	8	10	18	6
2023–24	Rungsted Seier Capital	DEN	42	17	26	43	2	4	1	1	2	0
2024–25	Herlev Eagles	DEN	46	13	34	47	22	4	0	2	2	0
2025–26	Herlev Eagles	DEN	35	13	29	42	6	14	1	14	15	4
DEN totals			474	150	277	427	362	83	19	45	64	65

=== International ===
Year	Team	Event	GP	G	A	Pts	PIM
2012	Denmark	WJC18	6	1	0	1	12
2013	Denmark	WJC18 D1A	5	3	3	6	2
2014	Denmark	WJC D1A	5	4	2	6	0
2015	Denmark	WJC	5	1	2	3	0
2021	Denmark	WC	2	1	0	1	0
2022	Denmark	WC	7	0	1	1	0
2023	Denmark	WC	3	0	0	0	0
Junior totals			21	9	7	16	14
Senior totals			12	1	1	2	0
