= Semyon Koshelev =

Kazakhstani ice hockey player

- Born: January 11, 1996 (age 30) Oskemen, Kazakhstan
- Height: 6 ft 0 in (183 cm)
- Weight: 172 lb (78 kg; 12 st 4 lb)
- Position: Left wing
- Shoots: Left
- KHL team Former teams: Sibir Novosibirsk; CSKA Moscow; Avangard Omsk; Metallurg Magnitogorsk; Ak Bars Kazan; Admiral Vladivostok; Sibir Novosibirsk; Shanghai Dragons
- Playing career: 2011–present

Semyon Yurevich Koshelev (Russian: Семён Юрьевич Кошелев; born January 11, 1996) is a Kazakhstani professional ice hockey player who is a forward for Sibir Novosibirsk of the KHL. Koshelev selected 4th overall in the first round of 2013 KHL Junior Draft by Neftekhimik Nizhnekamsk. On November 6, 2013, CSKA Moscow acquired the rights to Semyon Koshelev.

== International play ==
He was a best top scorer with 13 points at the 2013 IIHF World U18 Division B Championship with Team Kazakhstan and helped to promote the team to Division IA.

== Career statistics ==
=== Regular season ===
			Regular season					Playoffs
Season	Team	League	GP	G	A	Pts	PIM	GP	G	A	Pts	PIM
2011–12	Kazzinc-Torpedo-2	KAZ	36	8	5	13	6	—	—	—	—	—
2012–13	Kazzinc-Torpedo-2	KAZ	47	12	16	28	4	—	—	—	—	—
2013–14	Kazzinc-Torpedo-2	KAZ	4	1	1	2	0	—	—	—	—	—
2013–14	Kazzinc-Torpedo	VHL	47	4	10	14	8	6	1	0	1	0
2014–15	Krasnaya Armiya	MHL	32	6	8	14	8	10	1	0	1	2
2015–16	CSKA Moscow	KHL	10	0	0	0	2	12	0	0	0	2
2015–16	Zvezda Moscow	VHL	30	4	5	9	8	—	—	—	—	—
2015–16	Krasnaya Armiya	MHL	8	7	6	13	0	1	2	2	4	0
2016–17	CSKA Moscow	KHL	27	4	11	15	0	1	0	0	0	0
2016–17	Zvezda Moscow	VHL	6	1	1	2	0	3	0	0	0	4
2016–17	Krasnaya Armiya	MHL	—	—	—	—	—	10	11	9	20	0
2017–18	Avangard Omsk	KHL	45	8	15	23	8	7	3	2	5	0
2018–19	Avangard Omsk	KHL	40	2	2	4	0	16	2	2	4	5
2019–20	Avangard Omsk	KHL	61	10	13	23	2	6	1	2	3	0
2020–21	Avangard Omsk	KHL	3	0	0	0	2	—	—	—	—	—
2020–21	Metallurg Magnitogorsk	KHL	47	11	5	16	4	12	2	5	7	0
2021–22	Metallurg Magnitogorsk	KHL	47	13	14	27	10	15	2	1	3	4
2022–23	Metallurg Magnitogorsk	KHL	49	12	10	22	4	9	3	1	4	0
2023–24	Metallurg Magnitogorsk	KHL	34	4	10	14	6	—	—	—	—	—
2023–24	Ak Bars Kazan	KHL	24	11	6	17	2	5	1	0	1	0
2024–25	Ak Bars Kazan	KHL	67	13	8	21	6	9	0	2	2	2
2025–26	Admiral Vladivostok	KHL	19	2	8	10	0	—	—	—	—	—
2025–26	Sibir Novosibirsk	KHL	45	11	12	23	16	5	1	1	2	0
KHL totals			518	101	114	215	62	97	15	16	31	13

=== International ===
Year	Team	Event	GP	G	A	Pts	+/−	PIM
2012	Kazakhstan U18	U18 (Div I)	5	2	1	3	+1	0
2013	Kazakhstan U18	U18 (Div I)	5	6	7	13	+7	10
2013	Kazakhstan U20	WJC (Div I)	5	1	1	2	-1	0
2014	Kazakhstan U20	WJC (Div I)	5	3	6	9	+2	0
2014	Kazakhstan U18	U18 (Div I)	5	4	4	8	+4	0
Junior int'l totals			25	16	19	35	+13	10
