= Jan Pavlu =

Italian ice hockey player

- Born: 16 September 1994 (age 30); Bolzano, Italy
- Height: 1.89 m (6 ft 2 in)
- Weight: 85 kg (187 lb; 13 st 5 lb)
- Position: Defence
- Shoots: Left
- DEL2 team Former teams: EV Landshut; ESV Kaufbeuren; Heilbronner Falken; EHC Bayreuth
- National team: Italy
- NHL draft: Undrafted
- Playing career: 2015–present

Jan Pavlu (born 16 September 1994) is an Italian ice hockey player for the EV Landshut and the Italian national team. He was born in Italy to Czech parents: his father is Martin Pavlu and his grandfather is Jaroslav Pavlu, both former ice hockey players and national team members, for Italy and Czechoslovakia respectively.

He represented Italy at the 2019 IIHF World Championship.
