= Ross Venus =

English ice hockey player

- Born: 28 April 1994 (age 31); Birmingham, ENG
- Height: 5 ft 11 in (180 cm)
- Weight: 157 lb (71 kg; 11 st 3 lb)
- Position: Left winger
- Shot: Left
- NIHL team Former teams: Milton Keynes Lightning; Canterbury Red Devils; Telford Tigers; Coventry Blaze
- National team: Great Britain
- Playing career: 2010–2025

Ross Venus (born 28 April 1994) is an English professional ice hockey player currently playing for Milton Keynes Lightning of the National Ice Hockey League (NIHL).

Venus represented Great Britain at the 2021 IIHF World Championship.
