= Sergei Kuznetsov (ice hockey) =

Russian ice hockey left winger

- Born: January 29, 1980 (age 46) Yaroslavl, Russian SFSR, Soviet Union
- Height: 6 ft 0 in (183 cm)
- Weight: 198 lb (90 kg; 14 st 2 lb)
- Position: Left wing
- Shot: Left
- Played for: Amur Khabarovsk; Metallurg Novokuznetsk
- NHL draft: 146th overall, 1998; Tampa Bay Lightning
- Playing career: 1996–2013

Sergei Nikolayevich Kuznetsov (Russian: Сергей Николаевич Кузнецов; born January 29, 1980) is a Russian former professional ice hockey left winger. He currently works as a scout for the Arizona Coyotes of the National Hockey League.

== Career ==
Kuznetsov was drafted 146th overall in the 1998 NHL entry draft by the Tampa Bay Lightning. He spent the next two seasons playing in the junior Ontario Hockey League for the Peterborough Petes in an attempt to adapt to the North American style. He signed for the Lightning in 2000 and was assigned to their American Hockey League affiliate the Springfield Falcons, but he failed to score a single goal in 22 games and only registered four assists. He was subsequently sent down to the East Coast Hockey League with the Mississippi Sea Wolves.

Kuznetsov returned to Russia in 2004 with Amur Khabarovsk of the Vysshaya Liga. The following year he moved to the Russian Superleague with Metallurg Novokuznetsk before returning to Amur Khabarovsk.

On August 30, 2016, Kuznetsov became a scout for the Arizona Coyotes.
