= Edmunds Augstkalns =

Latvian ice hockey player

- Born: August 25, 1994 (age 30); Riga, Latvia
- Height: 178 cm (5 ft 10 in)
- Weight: 78 kg (172 lb; 12 st 4 lb)
- Position: Defence
- Shoots: Left
- KHL team (P) Cur. team: Dinamo Riga; HK Rīga (MHL)
- National team: Latvia
- Playing career: 2014–present

Edmunds Augstkalns (born August 25, 1994) is a Latvian ice hockey player currently playing for the HK Rīga of the MHL.

== Playing career ==
Augstkalns began his hockey career playing in minor and junior Latvian hockey leagues. In 2011/2012 season he joined HK Rīga Dinamo Rīga minor league affiliate. He made his KHL debut on September 23 on win against Atlant.
