= Roberts Lipsbergs =

Latvian professional ice hockey centre (born 1994)

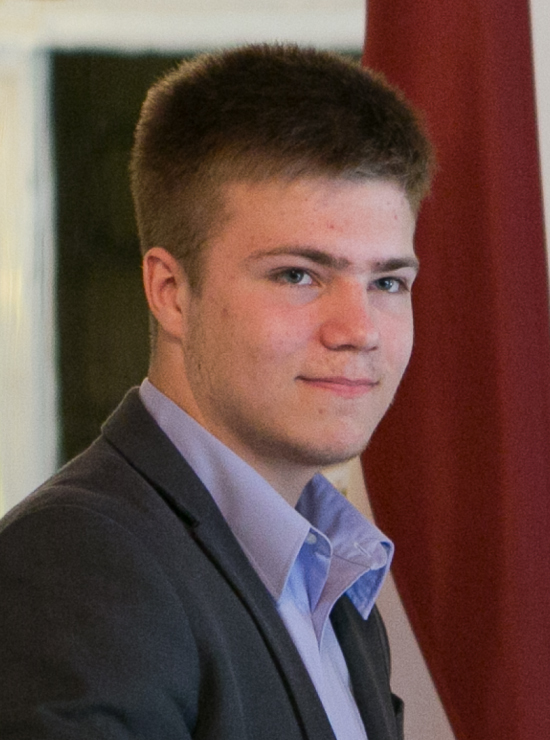
- Born: July 29, 1994 (age 31) Riga, Latvia
- Height: 5 ft 11 in (180 cm)
- Weight: 197 lb (89 kg; 14 st 1 lb)
- Position: Center
- Shoots: Left
- KHL team Former teams: Dinamo Riga; Stockton Thunder; Adirondack Thunder; Utah Grizzlies; Tulsa Oilers
- National team: Latvia
- NHL draft: Undrafted
- Playing career: 2014–present

Roberts Lipsbergs (born July 29, 1994 in Riga, Latvia) is a Latvian professional ice hockey centre who is currently playing for Dinamo Riga in the Kontinental Hockey League (KHL).

== Playing career ==
Lipsbergs began his career with SK Riga 18 where he spent two seasons in their youth system before spending the 2011–12 season with HK Rīga.

On June 27, 2012, Lipsbergs was selected by the Seattle Thunderbirds in the CHL Import Draft.

In the 2013–14 season, on October 5, 2013, Lipsbergs became the first WHL player to score and complete a hat trick in the 1st period of a game.

On September 25, 2014, the Stockton Thunder announced they had signed Lipsbergs to a one-year standard player contract. After 15 games with the Thunder, Lipsbergs was returned to major junior with the Thunderbirds.

On July 11, 2015, Lipsbergs returned to the newly relocated Thunder organization, to resume his professional career in signing a one-year contract with Adirondack. On November 27, 2015, he was traded to the Utah Grizzlies. Lipsbergs featured in 37 games with the Grizzlies, contributing with 16 points before he was placed on waivers and claimed by the Tulsa Oilers on March 25, 2016.

== Career statistics ==
=== Regular season and playoffs ===
			Regular season					Playoffs
Season	Team	League	GP	G	A	Pts	PIM	GP	G	A	Pts	PIM
2011–12	HK Rīga	MHL	58	14	14	28	51	5	1	2	3	2
2012–13	Seattle Thunderbirds	WHL	64	30	28	58	24	7	3	4	7	0
2013–14	Seattle Thunderbirds	WHL	68	33	19	52	37	9	2	6	8	4
2014–15	Stockton Thunder	ECHL	15	2	1	3	14	—	—	—	—	—
2014–15	Seattle Thunderbirds	WHL	33	16	20	36	14	6	1	1	2	1
2015–16	Adirondack Thunder	ECHL	2	0	0	0	0	—	—	—	—	—
2015–16	Utah Grizzlies	ECHL	37	9	7	16	10	—	—	—	—	—
2015–16	Tulsa Oilers	ECHL	9	2	4	6	0	—	—	—	—	—
2016–17	Dinamo Riga	KHL	31	3	4	7	12	—	—	—	—	—
2017–18	Dinamo Riga	KHL	40	2	3	5	28	—	—	—	—	—
2017–18	HK Liepājas Metalurgs	LHL	3	0	0	0	0	—	—	—	—	—
2018–19	Dinamo Riga	KHL	22	0	2	2	8	—	—	—	—	—
2018–19	HK Liepājas Metalurgs	LHL	14	4	7	11	32	—	—	—	—	—
2019–20	Dinamo Riga	KHL	44	2	8	10	10	—	—	—	—	—
2019–20	HK Liepājas Metalurgs	LHL	1	0	0	0	0	—	—	—	—	—
KHL totals			137	7	17	24	58	—	—	—	—	—

Medal record

Representing Latvia

Ice hockey

IIHF World U18 Championships
Gold medal – first place	2011 Latvia	Division I Group A

=== International ===
Year	Team	Event	Result	GP	G	A	Pts	PIM
2011	Latvia	U18 D-1	11th	4	4	0	4	6
2012	Latvia	U18	9th	6	4	0	4	2
2012	Latvia	WJC	9th	6	2	1	3	2
2013	Latvia	WJC	10th	6	1	1	2	2
2014	Latvia	WJC D1	13th	5	6	1	7	2
2014	Latvia	WC	11th	4	0	0	0	2
Junior totals				27	17	3	20	14
Senior totals				4	0	0	0	2
