= Peter Hochkofler =

Italian ice hockey player

- Born: 4 October 1994 (age 31) Bolzano, Italy
- Height: 6 ft 3 in (191 cm)
- Weight: 203 lb (92 kg; 14 st 7 lb)
- Position: Forward
- Shoots: Right
- ICEHL team: EC Red Bull Salzburg
- National team: Italy
- Playing career: 2015–present

Peter Hochkofler (born 4 October 1994) is an Italian professional ice hockey player currently playing for EC Red Bull Salzburg in the ICE Hockey League (ICEHL) and the Italian national team.

He represented Italy at the 2019 IIHF World Championship.
