= Alexei Mastryukov =

Russian ice hockey player (born 1992)

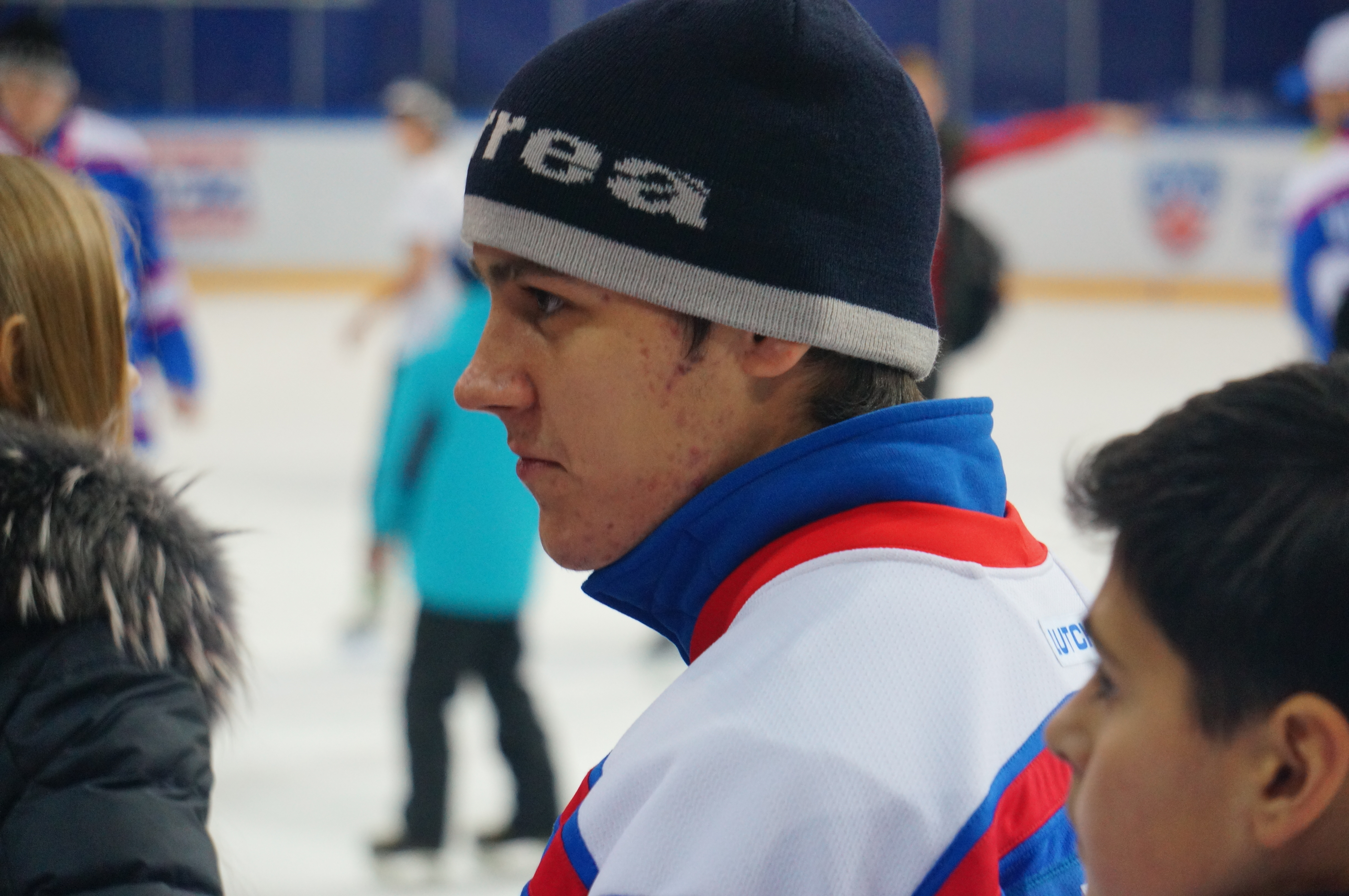
- Born: September 15, 1992 (age 32); Togliatti, Russia
- Height: 5 ft 9 in (175 cm)
- Weight: 185 lb (84 kg; 13 st 3 lb)
- Position: Forward
- Shoots: Left
- VHL team: Lada Togliatti
- Playing career: 2012–present

Alexei Mastryukov (born September 15, 1992) is a Russian professional ice hockey player. He is currently playing with HC Lada Togliatti of the Supreme Hockey League (VHL).

Mastryukov made his Kontinental Hockey League debut playing with HC Lada Togliatti during the 2014–15 KHL season.
