= Giovanni Morini =

Italian ice hockey player (born 1995)

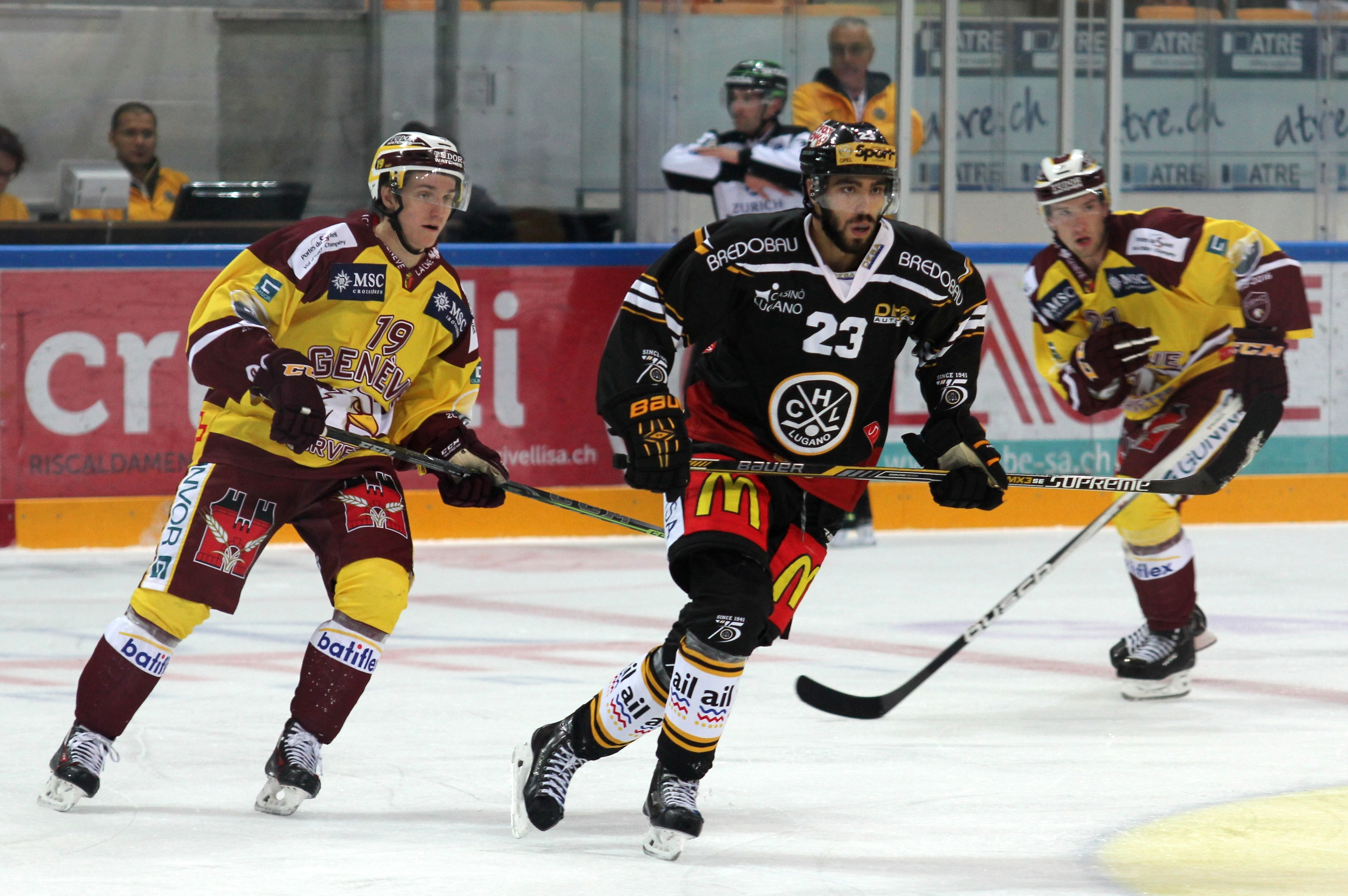
- Born: 2 February 1995 (age 31) Como, Italy
- Height: 6 ft 2 in (188 cm)
- Weight: 198 lb (90 kg; 14 st 2 lb)
- Position: Forward
- Shoots: Left
- NL team: HC Lugano
- National team: Italy
- Playing career: 2015–present

Giovanni Morini (born 2 February 1995) is an Italian professional ice hockey player who is a forward for HC Lugano of the National League (NL).

== International play ==
Morini represented the Italy national team at the 2026 Winter Olympics and the 2017 IIHF World Championship.
