= Andrei Antonov =

Belarusian ice hockey player (born 1985)

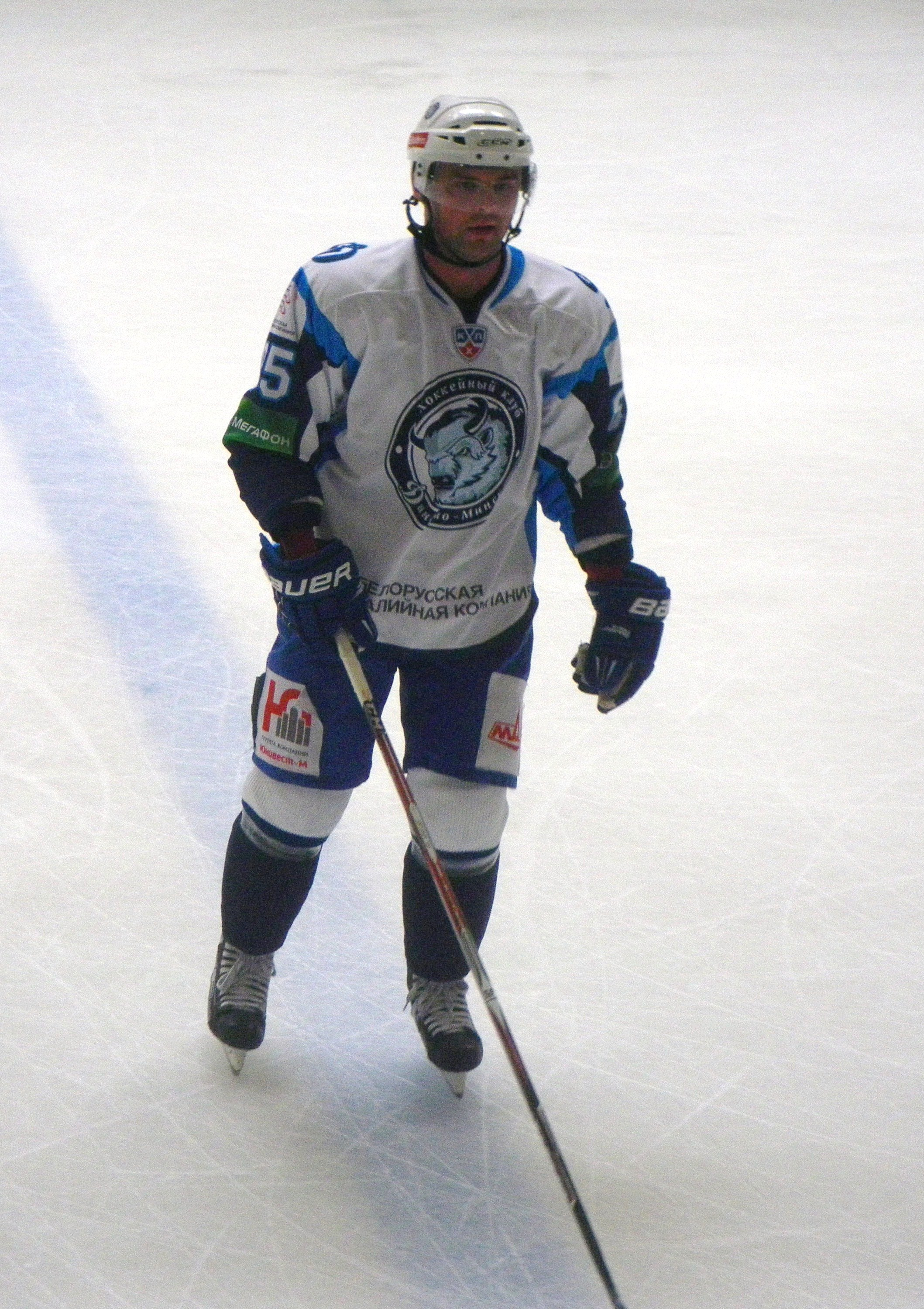
- Born: April 27, 1985 (age 39); Ramenskoe, Russian SFSR, Soviet Union
- Height: 6 ft 0 in (183 cm)
- Weight: 183 lb (83 kg; 13 st 1 lb)
- Position: Defence
- Shoots: Left
- BXL team Former teams: Yunost Minsk; HK Mogilev; Keramin Minsk; HC Dynamo Minsk; HC Shakhtyor Soligorsk; Avtomobilist Yekaterinburg; HC Yugra
- National team: Belarus
- Playing career: 2003–present

Andrei Igorevich Antonov (Russian: Андрей Игоревич Антонов) (born April 27, 1985) is a Belarusian professional ice hockey defenceman. He currently plays for Yunost Minsk of the Belarusian Extraliga (BXL). He has previously played in the Kontinental Hockey League with HC Dynamo Minsk, Avtomobilist Yekaterinburg and HC Yugra.
