= Nik Pem =

Slovenian ice hockey player

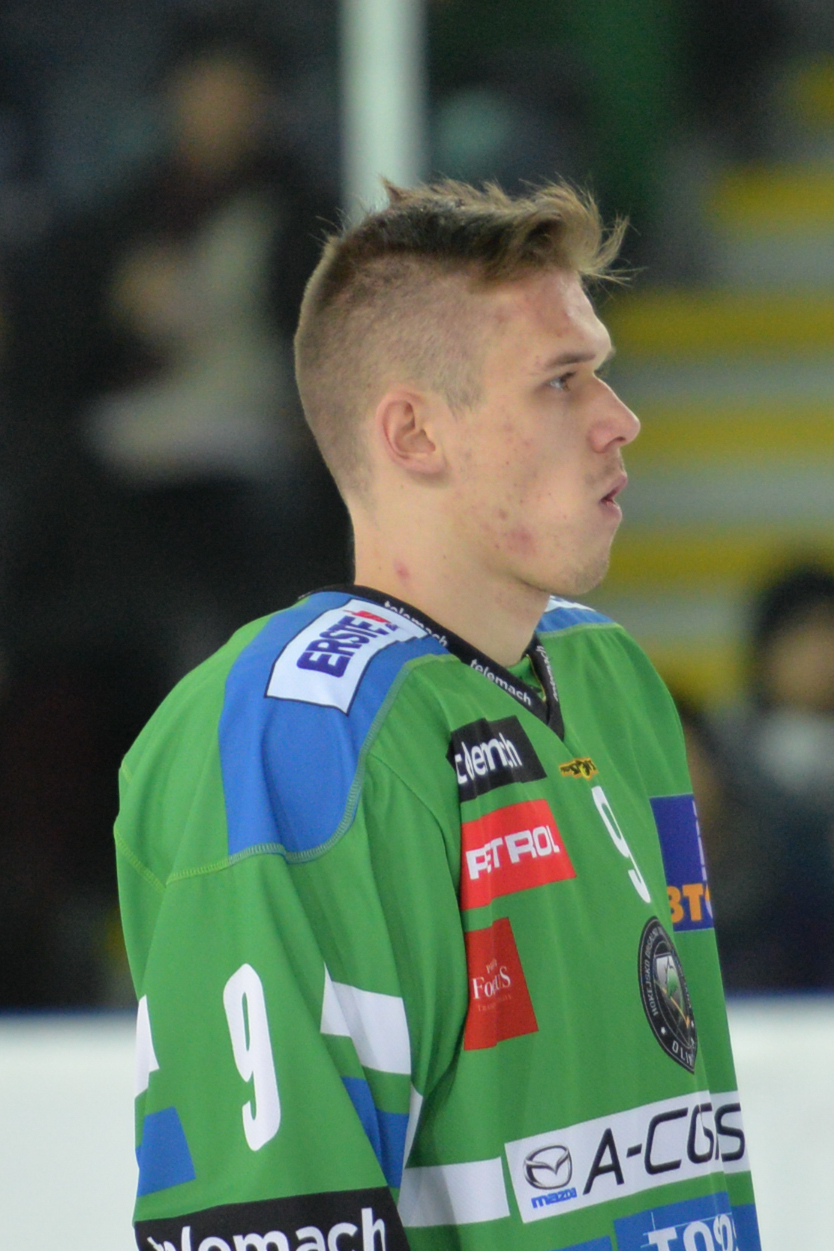
- Born: 30 August 1995 (age 29); Jesenice, Slovenia
- Height: 6 ft 2 in (188 cm)
- Weight: 196 lb (89 kg; 14 st 0 lb)
- Position: Forward
- Shoots: Left
- Carinthian Division 1 team Former teams: ESV Ferlach; HD Mladi Jesenice; HK Acroni Jesenice; HDD Jesenice; HDD Olimpija Ljubljana; Heilbronner Falken
- National team: Slovenia
- Playing career: 2010–present

Nik Pem (born 30 August 1995) is a Slovenian ice hockey forward who currently plays for ESV Ferlach and the Slovenian national team.

He participated at the 2017 IIHF World Championship.
