= Patrick Peter =

Austrian ice hockey player

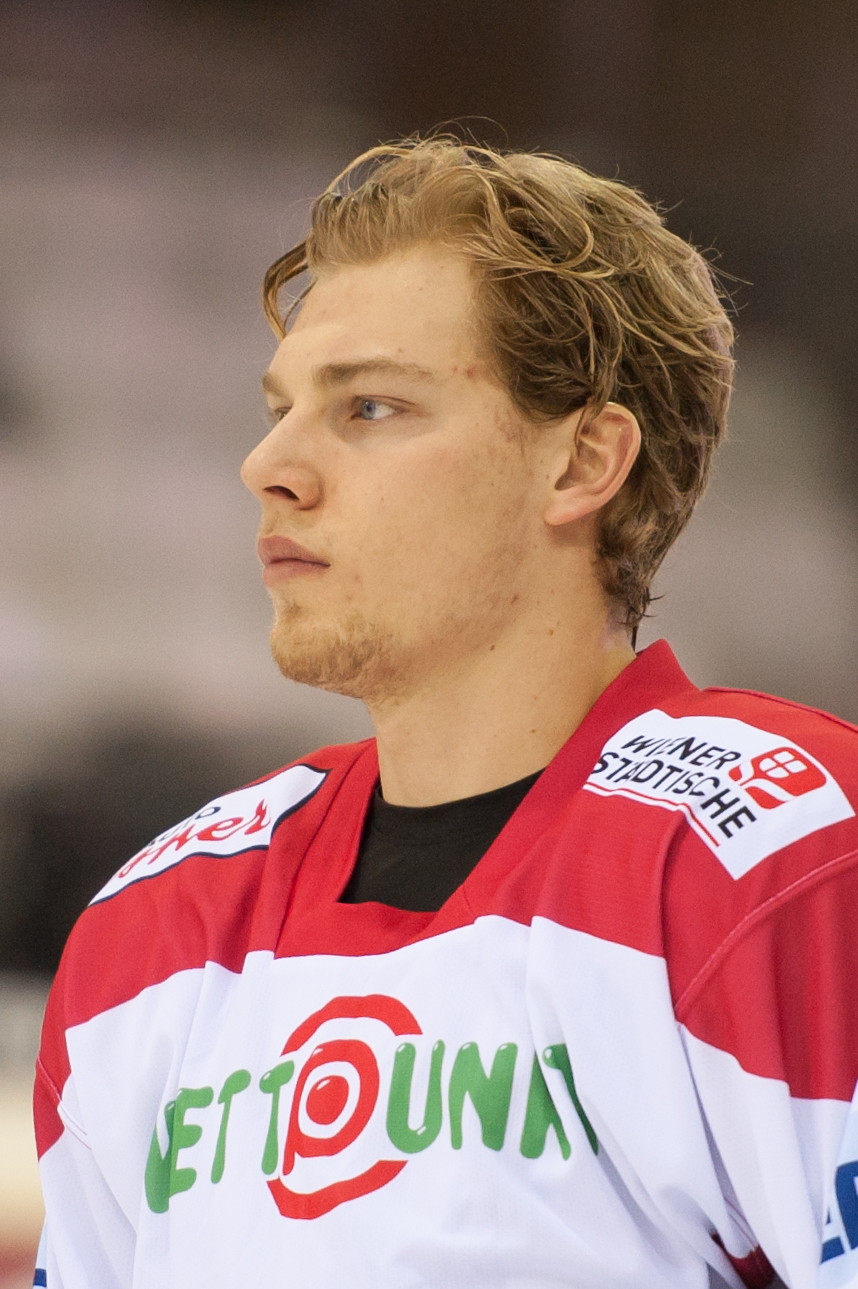
- Born: January 27, 1994 (age 32) Vienna, Austria
- Height: 6 ft 1 in (185 cm)
- Weight: 198 lb (90 kg; 14 st 2 lb)
- Position: Defence
- Shoots: Right
- EBEL team: Vienna Capitals
- National team: Austria
- Playing career: 2010–present

Patrick Peter (born January 27, 1994) is an Austrian professional ice hockey player for Vienna Capitals of the Austrian Hockey League (EBEL) and the Austrian national team. He participated at the 2015 IIHF World Championship. On May 9, 2014, Peter was re-signed by the Capitals to a two-year contract extension.
