= Maxim Malyutin =

Belarusian ice hockey player

- Born: September 16, 1988 (age 36); Yaroslavl, Russian SFSR, Soviet Union
- Height: 6 ft 0 in (183 cm)
- Weight: 187 lb (85 kg; 13 st 5 lb)
- Position: Goaltender
- Catches: Left
- Belarus team Former teams: Yunost Minsk; HK Vitebsk
- National team: Belarus
- Playing career: 2005–present

Maxim Sergeyevich Malyutin (Russian: Максим Серге́евич Малютин) (born 16 September 1988 in Yaroslavl, Russian SFSR, Soviet Union) is a Belarusian professional ice hockey goaltender. He currently plays for Yunost Minsk of the Belarusian Extraliga. Malyutin was selected for the Belarus national men's ice hockey team in the 2010 Winter Olympics.
