= Alexander Kogalev =

Belarusian ice hockey player

- Born: 22 May 1994 (age 32) Minsk, Belarus
- Height: 6 ft 1 in (185 cm)
- Weight: 194 lb (88 kg; 13 st 12 lb)
- Position: Forward
- Shoots: Left
- KHL team: Dinamo Minsk
- National team: Belarus
- Playing career: 2010–present

Alexander Kogalev (born 22 May 1994) is a Belarusian professional ice hockey player currently playing with HC Yugra of the Kontinental Hockey League (KHL) and the Belarusian national team.

He participated at the 2017 IIHF World Championship.

In August 2022, HC Yugra announced the signing of a contract with a hockey player.
