= Artur Gavrus =

Belarusian ice hockey player

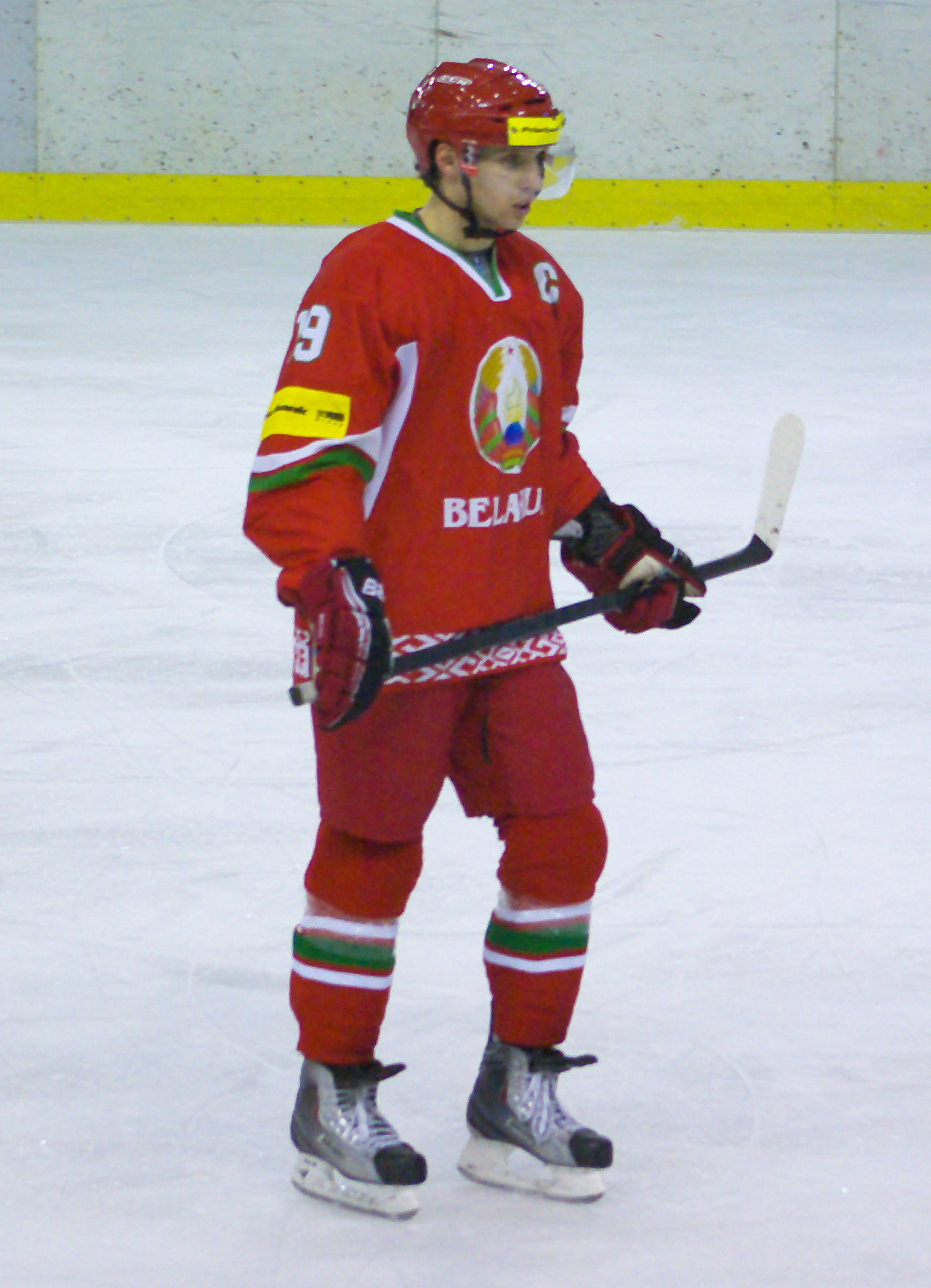
- Gavus in 2013
- Born: 3 January 1994 (age 32) Ratichi, Belarus
- Height: 5 ft 10 in (178 cm)
- Weight: 185 lb (84 kg; 13 st 3 lb)
- Position: Forward
- Shoots: Left
- BXL team Former teams: Metallurg Zhlobin; HK Neman Grodno; Dinamo Minsk; Vaasan Sport; HC Dinamo Saint Petersburg
- National team: Belarus
- NHL draft: 180th overall, 2012; New Jersey Devils
- Playing career: 2012–present

Artur Yurievich Gavrus (Belarusian: Артур Юр'евiч Гаўрус, Russian: Артур Юрьевич Гаврус; born 3 January 1994) is a Belarusian ice hockey player. He is currently playing for HC Dinamo Saint Petersburg of the Supreme Hockey League (VHL). He formerly played with HC Dinamo Minsk of the Kontinental Hockey League (KHL). He was selected by the New Jersey Devils in the 6th round (180th overall) of the 2012 NHL entry draft. He previously played for the Owen Sound Attack of the Ontario Hockey League, a major junior league in Canada.

Gavrus competed in the 2013 IIHF World Championship as a member of the Belarus men's national ice hockey team.
