= Mikhail Karnaukhov =

Belarusian ice hockey player

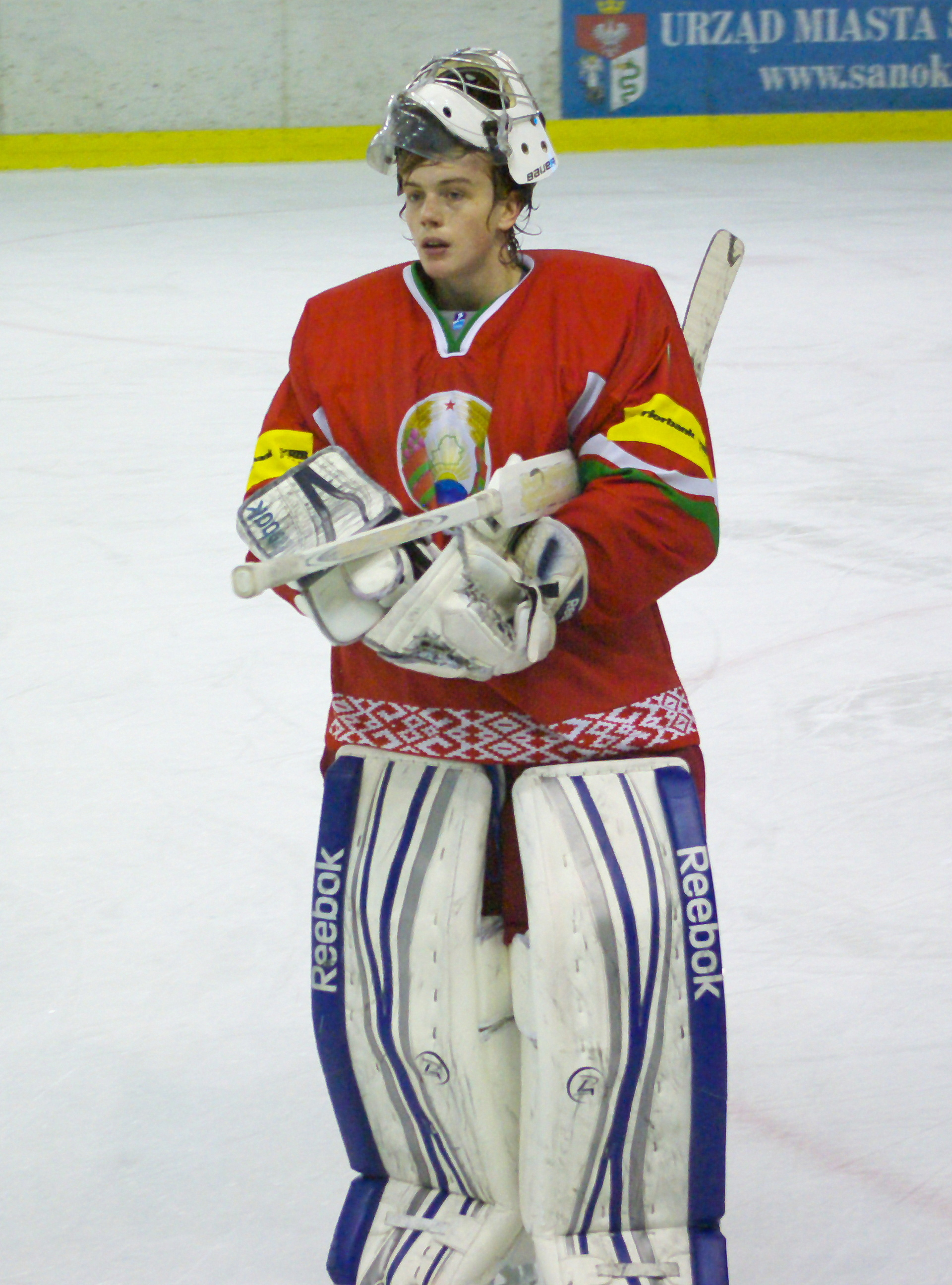
- Born: February 22, 1994 (age 31) Minsk, Belarus
- Height: 6 ft 0 in (183 cm)
- Weight: 196 lb (89 kg; 14 st 0 lb)
- Position: Goaltender
- Catches: Left
- BXL team Former teams: HK Neman Grodno; Dinamo Minsk; HC Shakhtyor Soligorsk; Metallurg Zhlobin
- National team: Belarus
- Playing career: 2010–present

Mikhail Karnaukhov (born February 22, 1994) is a Belarusian professional ice hockey Goaltender who is currently playing for Metallurg Novokuznetsk in the Supreme Hockey League (VHL) and the Belarusian national team.

He participated at the 2017 IIHF World Championship.
