= List of IIHF World Junior Championship players for Canada =

List of ice hockey players who represented Canada at the World Junior Championships

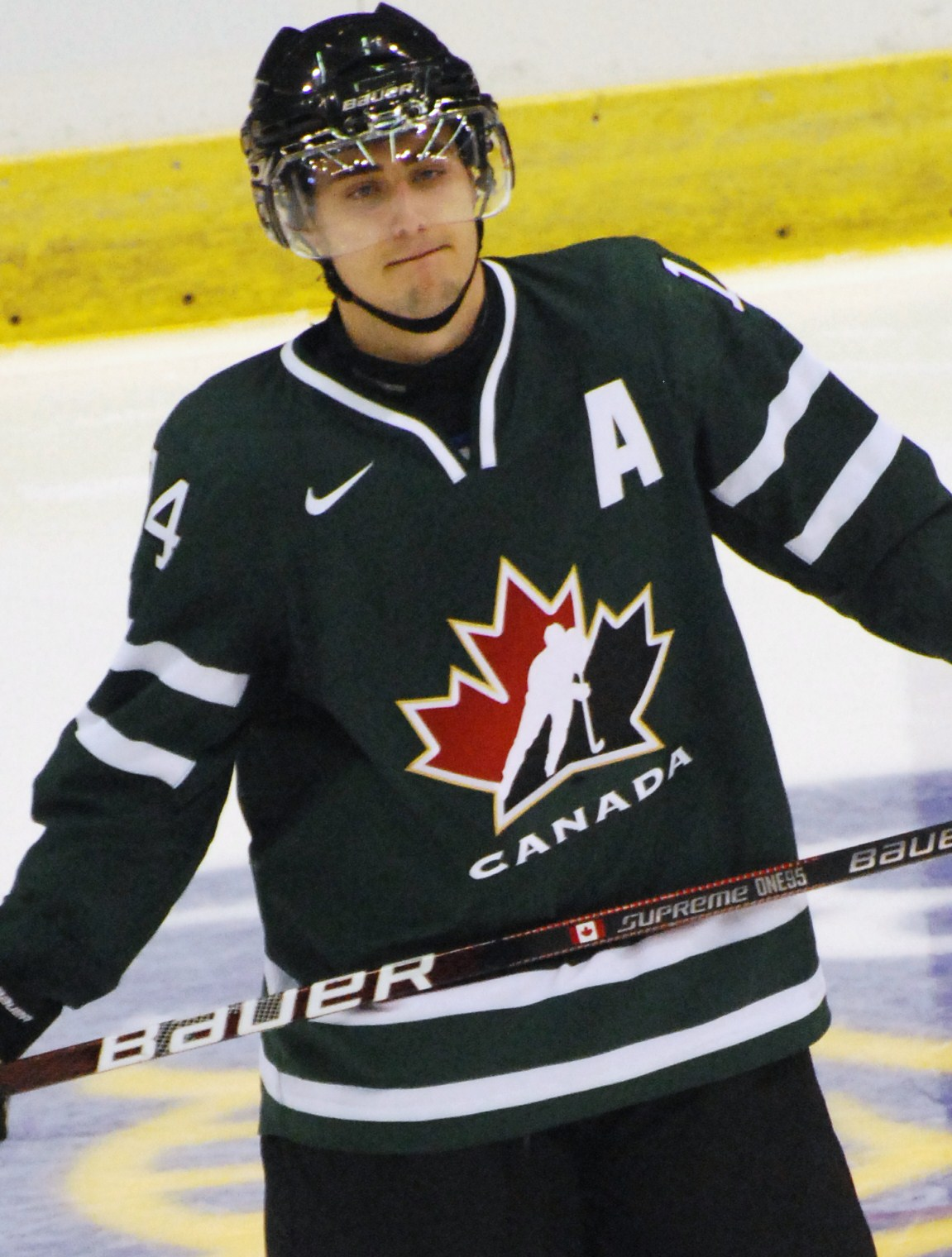
Jordan Eberle, who played in the 2009 and 2010 tournaments, is Canada's all-time leading goal scorer, with 14 goals.

Canada has participated in all 39 World Under-20 Championships, an annual ice hockey tournament organized by the International Ice Hockey Federation (IIHF). The first World Under-20 Championship was held in 1974, although the IIHF considers the first three years to be unofficial invitational tournaments. In 1977, the Ice Hockey World Championships became an "open competition" which allowed all players, professional and amateur, to participate. With National Hockey League (NHL) players participating in the tournament, IIHF officials began to fear that true amateurs and young players were losing their places. As a result, full world championship status was given to the World Under-20 Championship. Colloquially known as the World Junior Hockey Championship, the event was structured after the World Championships, but limited to players under the age of 20. During the first years of the tournament, Canada did not have a national team, instead choosing to send a club team, typically the Memorial Cup winner. In 1978, an all-star team was sent. The first national junior team participated in the 1982 tournament, and became the first Canadian team to win a gold medal. Canada has won more gold medals than any other nation and has had two five-year gold medal-winning streaks, during 1993–1997 and 2005–2009. The Canadian team is usually composed mostly of players from the Canadian Hockey League, a major junior umbrella organization that consists of the Ontario Hockey League, Quebec Major Junior Hockey League and Western Hockey League.

One of the most infamous incidents in tournament history occurred in 1987 in Piestany, Czechoslovakia, where a massive brawl involving all players on both teams occurred between Canada and the Soviet Union. It began when Pavel Kostichkin took a two-handed slash at Theoren Fleury and the Soviet Union's Evgeny Davydov came off the bench, eventually leading to most of the players from both teams joining the brawl. The officials, unable to break up the fight, walked off the ice and eventually tried shutting off the arena lights, but the brawl lasted for 20 minutes before the game was declared null and void. An emergency IIHF meeting resulted in the delegates voting 7–1 to disqualify both teams from the tournament. While the Soviets were out of medal contention, Canada was playing for the gold medal, and were leading 4–2 at the time of the brawl. The gold medal ultimately went to Finland, hosts Czechoslovakia took the silver and Sweden, who had been eliminated from medal contention, was awarded the bronze. The IIHF voted to suspend all players involved from competing in international events for 18 months, and all coaches for three years. Player suspensions were later cut to six months, which allowed eligible players such as Fleury to participate in the 1988 tournament. The brawl helped raise the profile of the tournament in Canada, where the tournament now ranks as one of the most important hockey events.

Since 1977, Canada has participated in every tournament, sending 673 players: 64 goaltenders and 609 skaters (forwards and defencemen). During this period, Canadian teams have won 29 medals: 16 gold, eight silver and five bronze. Canadian cities have hosted the tournament a combined 11 times, more than any other nation. Because of the age restrictions, the majority of players have participated in only one tournament. However, 142 players (131 skaters, 11 goaltenders) have played in two tournaments. Seven players—Jason Botterill, Jay Bouwmeester, Ryan Ellis, Trevor Kidd, Martin Lapointe, Eric Lindros and Jason Spezza—have played in three tournaments. As of 2015, 513 players (464 skaters and 49 goaltenders), or 76.3% of players, have won at least one medal. Of that number, 298 (29 goaltenders and 269 skaters), or 44.3% of all players, have won at least one gold medal. Forty-four players (41 skaters and 3 goaltenders), or 6.5%, have won two or more gold medals. Jason Botterill is the only Canadian player to win three gold medals (1994–1996), while three other players have also won three medals: Jason Spezza and Jay Bouwmeester (both 2000–2002) won two bronze and one silver, while Ryan Ellis (2009–2011) won a gold and two silvers. Eric Lindros, who scored 12 goals and 19 assists for a total of 31 points over three tournaments (1990–1992), is Canada's all-time assists and points leader in the tournament. Jordan Eberle, who played in the 2009 and 2010 tournaments, is Canada's all-time leading goal scorer, with 14 goals.

== Key ==
Abbreviations
GP	Games played
WCs	Number of World Championships
HHOF	Hockey Hall of Fame
IIHFHOF	IIHF Hall of Fame
CSHOF	Canada's Sports Hall of Fame

IIHF Directorate Awards
Best Goaltender	Awarded since 1977
Best Defenceman	Awarded since 1977
Best Forward	Awarded since 1977
Most Valuable Player	Awarded since 2005

Goaltenders
W	Wins	SO	Shutouts
L	Losses	GA	Goals against
T	Ties	GAA	Goals against average
Min	Minutes played		

Skaters
P	Points	G	Goals
PIM	Penalty minutes	A	Assists

== Goaltenders ==
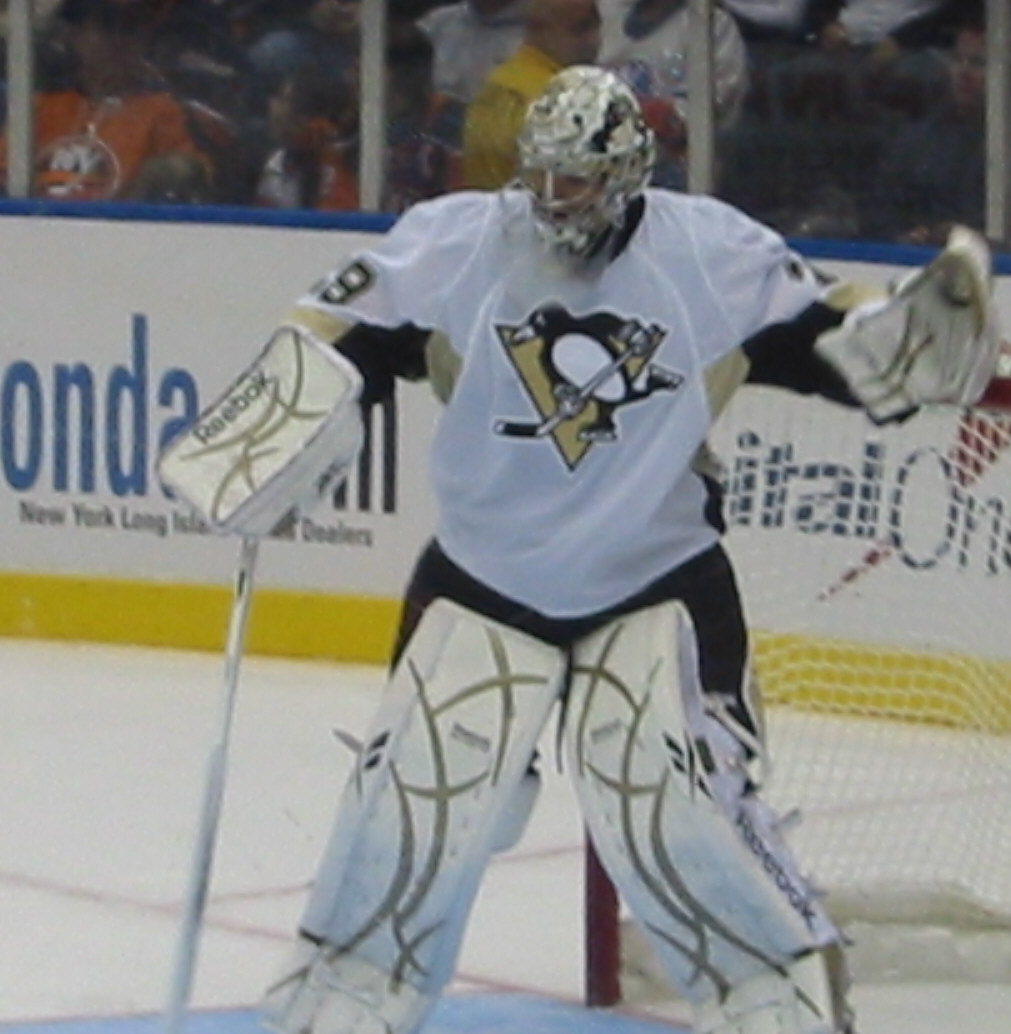
Marc-André Fleury won silver medals in 2003 and 2004, and was named Best Goaltender in 2003.

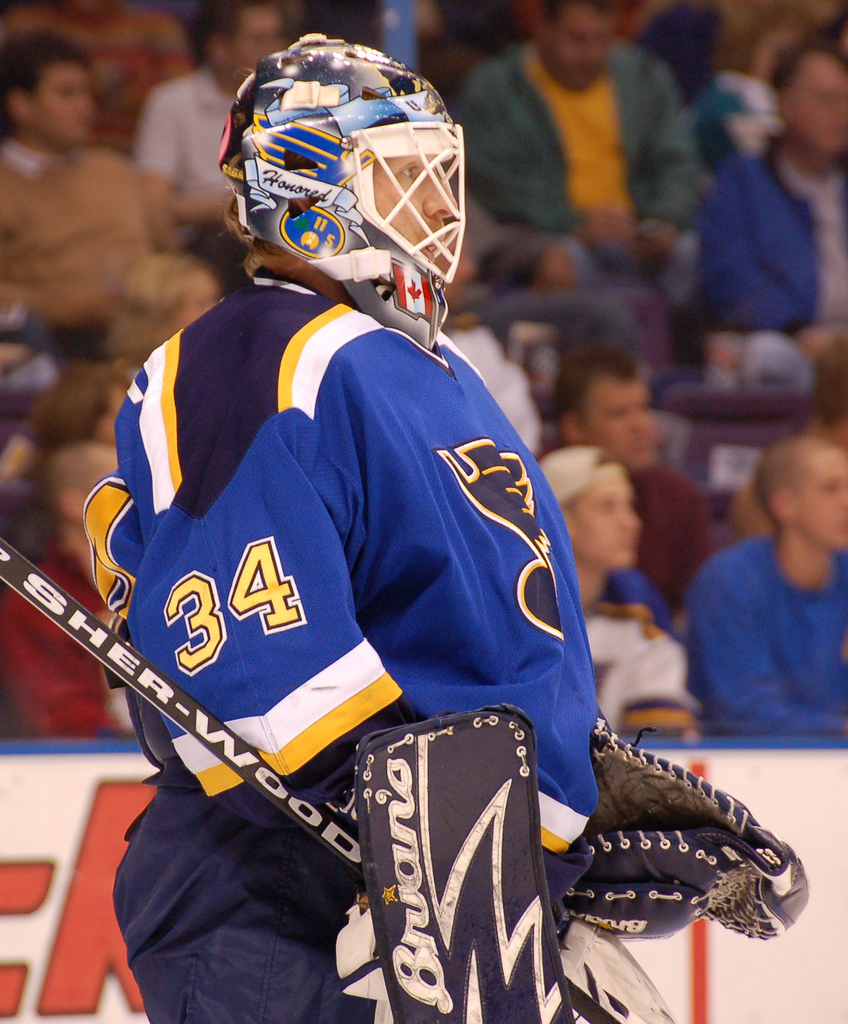
Manny Legace won a gold medal in 1993 and was named Best Goaltender.

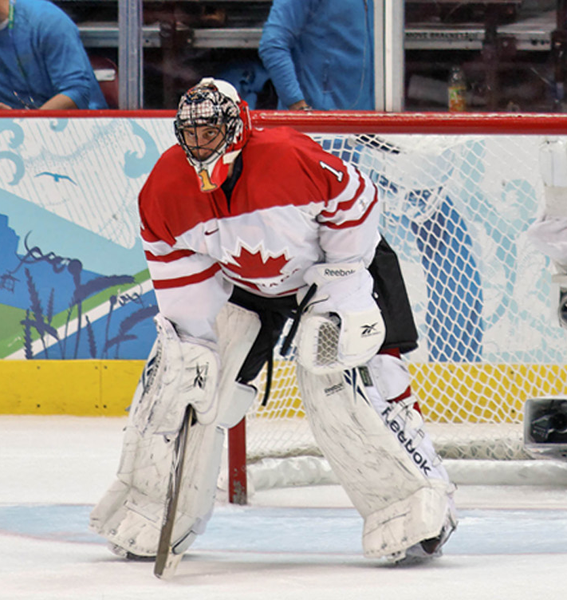
Roberto Luongo played in 1998 and won a gold medal and was named Best Goaltender in 1999.

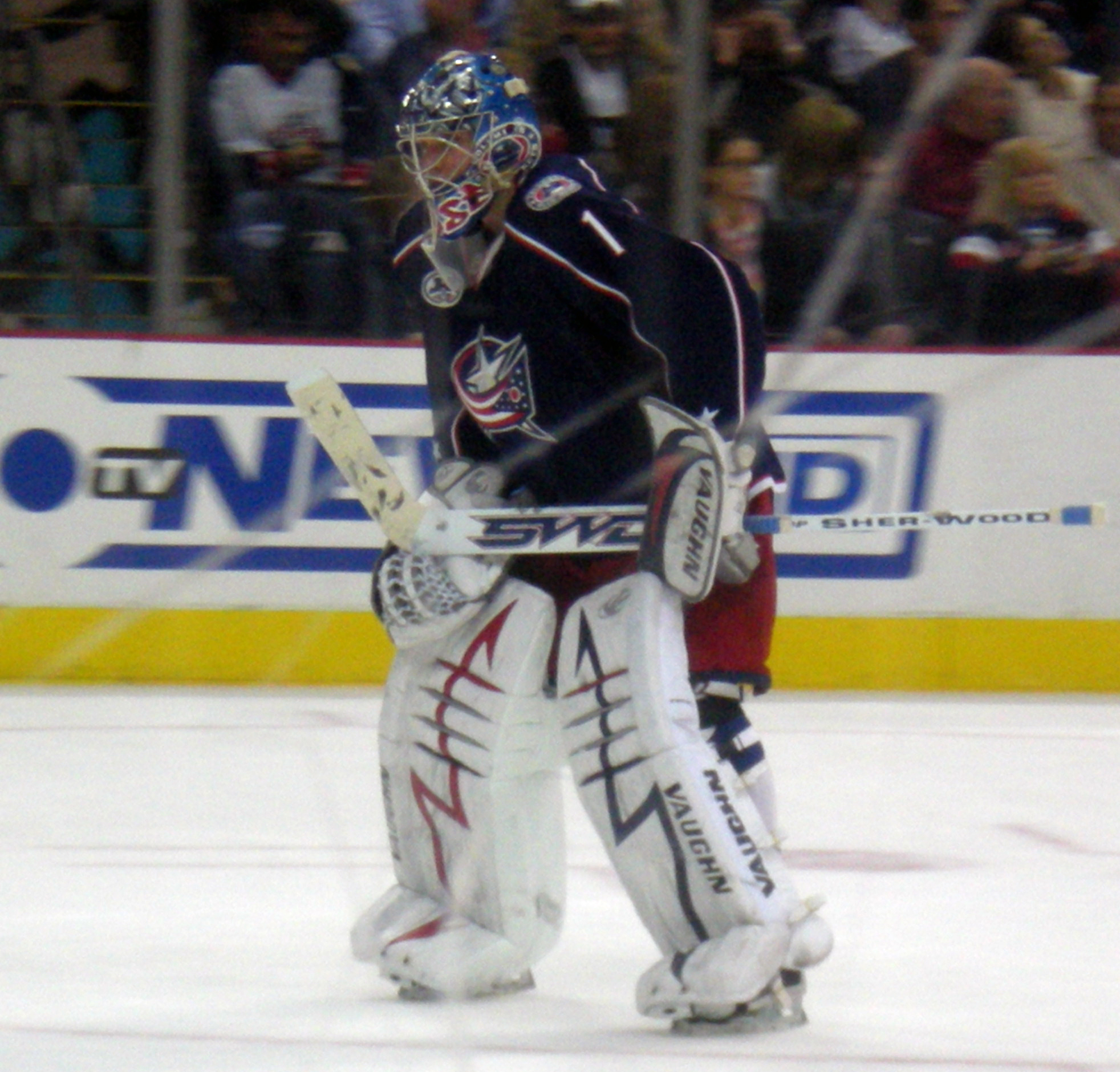
Steve Mason played in the 2008 tournament, winning a gold medal and the awards for Most Valuable Player and Best Goaltender.

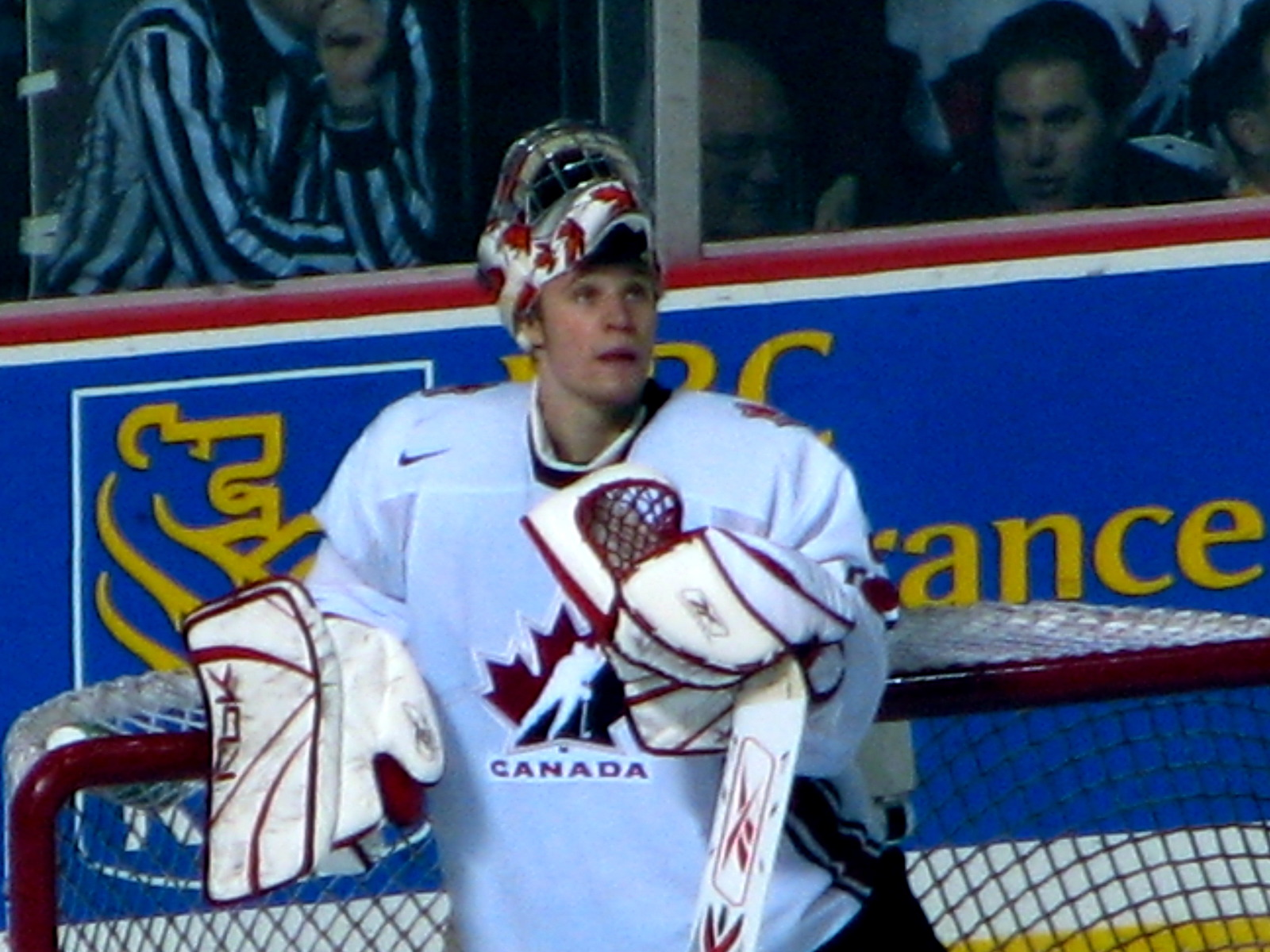
Justin Pogge won a gold medal in the 2006 tournament.

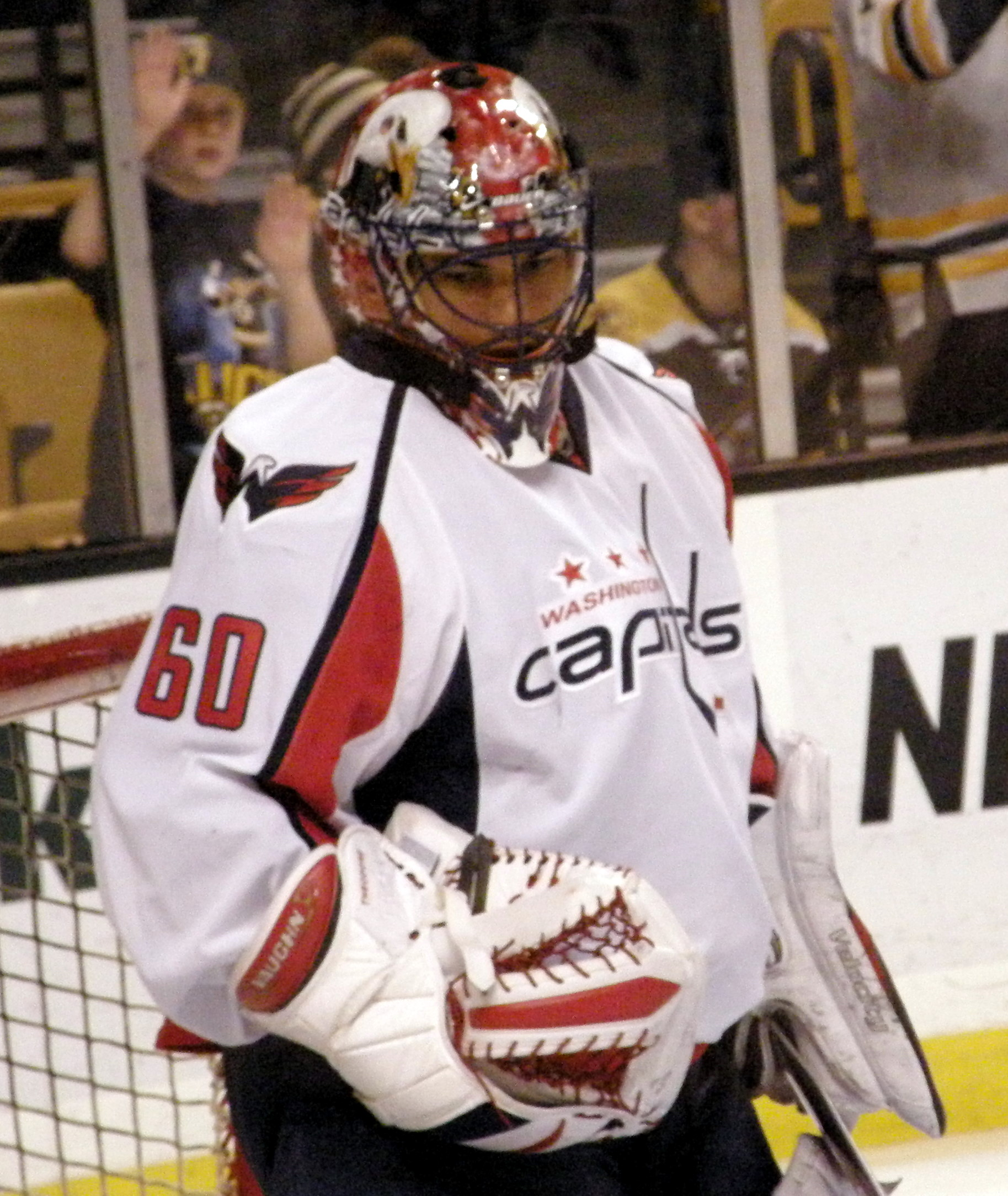
José Théodore won a gold medal in 1996 and was named Best Goaltender.

Player	WCs	Tournament(s)	GP	W	L	T	SO	Min	GA	GAA	Medals	Notes
Jake Allen	1	2010	5	3	0	0	2	291	10	2.06	Silver (2010)	
Alex Auld	1	2001	1	0	0	0	0	20	4	12.00	Bronze (2001)	
Réjean Beauchemin	1	2003, 2005	1	1	0	0	1	60	0	0.00	Gold (2003) Gold (2005)	Best Goaltender (2003)
Tim Bernhardt	1	1978	3	3	0	0	1	180	6	2.00	Bronze (1978)	
Jonathan Bernier	1	2008	2	1	1	0	1	120	4	2.00	Gold (2008)	
Allan Bester	1	1984	2	1	0	0	1	120	2	1.00		
Craig Billington	1	1985, 1986	10	6	2	2	1	600	27	2.70	Gold (1985); Silver (1986)	Best Goaltender (1985)
Jordan Binnington	1	2013	2	0	0	0	0	35	4	6.82		
Martin Biron	1	1997	1	0	0	0	0	0:08	0	0.00	Gold (1997)	
Sean Burke	1	1986	2	2	0	0	0	120	7	3.50	Silver (1986)	
Frank Caprice	1	1982	3	3	0	0	0	180	7	2.33	Gold (1982)	
Dan Cloutier	1	1995	3	3	0	0	0	180	8	2.67	Gold (1995)	
Eric Comrie	1	2015	2	2	0	0	1	120	3	1.50	Gold (2015)	
Bob Daly	1	1977	0	—	—	—	—	—	—	—	Silver (1977)	Did not play in any games.
Marc Denis	2	1996, 1997	9	7	0	2	1	540	15	1.67	Gold (1996); Gold (1997)	Best Goaltender (1997)
Philippe DeRouville	1	1993	1	0	1	0	0	60	7	7.00	Gold (1993)	
Devan Dubnyk	1	2006	0	—	—	—	—	—	—	—	Gold (2006)	
Manny Fernandez	1	1994	3	3	0	0	0	180	10	3.33	Gold (1994)	
Brian Finley	2	1999, 2000	2	1	0	0	0	90	5	3.33	Silver (1999); Bronze (2000)	
Stéphane Fiset	2	1989, 1990	13	8	3	2	1	749	36	2.88	Gold (1990)	Best Goaltender (1990)
Marc-André Fleury	2	2003, 2004	10	6	2	0	2	566	16	1.70	Silver (2003); Silver (2004)	Best Goaltender (2003)
Norm Foster	1	1985	2	2	0	0	1	120	1	0.50	Gold (1985)	
Mike Fountain	1	1992	0	—	—	—	—	—	—	—		
Zachary Fucale	2	2014, 2015	10	7	3	0	2	598	18	1.81	Gold (2015)	
Mathieu Garon	1	1998	5	2	3	0	2	283	9	1.91		
Jeff Glass	1	2005	5	5	0	0	0	300	7	1.40	Gold (2005)	
Tom Graovac	1	1981	3	1	0	0	0	87	5	3.45		
Jeff Hackett	1	1988	0	—	—	—	—	—	—	—	Gold (1988)	
Josh Harding	1	2004	1	1	0	0	1	60	0	0.00	Silver (2004)	
Leland Irving	1	2007	0	—	—	—	—	—	—	—	Gold (2007)	
Al Jensen	2	1977, 1978	10	6	3	1	1	600	32	3.20	Silver (1977); Bronze (1978)	
Martin Jones	1	2010	2	1	1	0	0	78	3	2.30	Silver (2010)	
Trevor Kidd	3	1990, 1991, 1992	13	6	4	2	1	760	44	3.47	Gold (1990); Gold (1991)	
Rick LaFerriere	1	1980	4	2	2	0	0	240	13	3.25		
Pascal Leclaire	1	2002	5	4	1	0	2	299	9	1.80	Silver (2002)	
Manny Legace	1	1993	6	6	0	0	1	360	10	1.67	Gold (1993)	Best Goaltender (1993)
David LeNeveu	1	2003	2	2	0	0	0	92	4	2.63	Silver (2003)	
Roberto Luongo	2	1998, 1999	10	4	4	1	2	551	22	2.40	Silver (1999)	Best Goaltender (1999)
Steve Mason	1	2008	5	5	0	0	1	304	6	1.19	Gold (2008)	Most Valuable Player (2008); Best Goaltender (2008)
Rollie Melanson	1	1979	2	2	0	0	0	120	3	1.50		
Corrado Micalef	1	1981	4	0	3	1	0	213	20	5.63		
Olivier Michaud	1	2002	2	1	1	0	0	120	5	2.50	Silver (2002)	
Mike Moffat	1	1982	4	3	0	1	1	240	7	1.75	Gold (1982)	Best Goaltender (1982)
Gus Morschauser	1	1989	2	1	0	0	0	92	5	3.30		
Maxime Ouellet	2	2000, 2001	13	7	3	3	1	759	21	1.66	Bronze (2000); Bronze (2001)	
Jake Paterson	2	2014	2	1	1	0	0	125	7	3.36		
Chet Pickard	1	2009	2	2	0	0	1	120	1	0.50	Gold (2009)	
Justin Pogge	1	2006	6	6	0	0	3	360	6	1.00	Gold (2006)	
Félix Potvin	1	1991	2	1	0	0	0	80	3	2.25	Gold (1991)	
Carey Price	1	2007	6	6	0	0	2	370	7	1.14	Gold (2007)	Most Valuable Player (2007); Best Goaltender (2007)
Olivier Roy	1	2011	3	2	1	0	0	185	11	3.57	Silver (2011)	
Mike Sands	1	1983	5	2	2	1	1	239	14	3.51	Bronze (1983)	
Tom Semenchuk	1	1979	3	1	2	0	0	180	7	2.33		
Shawn Simpson	1	1987^{[Note 1]}	4	2	1	1	0	200	13	3.90		
Jamie Storr	1	1994, 1995	8	7	0	1	0	480	24	3.00	Gold (1994); Gold (1995)	Best Goaltender (1994)
Malcolm Subban	1	2013	6	4	2	0	0	326	15	2.76		
José Théodore	1	1996	4	4	0	0	0	240	6	1.50	Gold (1996)	Best Goaltender (1996)
Dustin Tokarski	1	2009	4	4	0	0	0	249	11	2.65	Gold (2009)	
Mike Vernon	1	1983	4	2	0	0	1	180	10	3.33	Bronze (1983)	
Mark Visentin	2	2011, 2012	8	6	2	0	1	449	13	1.73	Silver (2011); Bronze (2012)	
Jimmy Waite	2	1987,^{[Note 1]} 1988	10	8	0	1	0	579	26	2.70	Gold (1988)	Best Goaltender (1988)
Scott Wedgewood	1	2012	3	2	0	0	1	149	6	2.42	Bronze (2012)	
Ken Wregget	1	1984	5	2	2	1	1	300	14	2.80		
Terry Wright	1	1980	1	1	0	0	0	60	5	5.00		

== Skaters ==
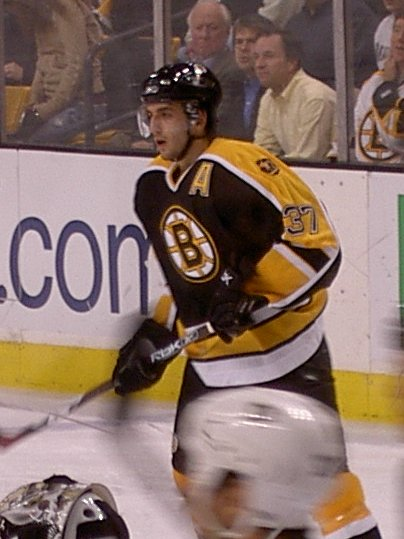
Patrice Bergeron won a gold medal and was named Most Valuable Player in 2005.

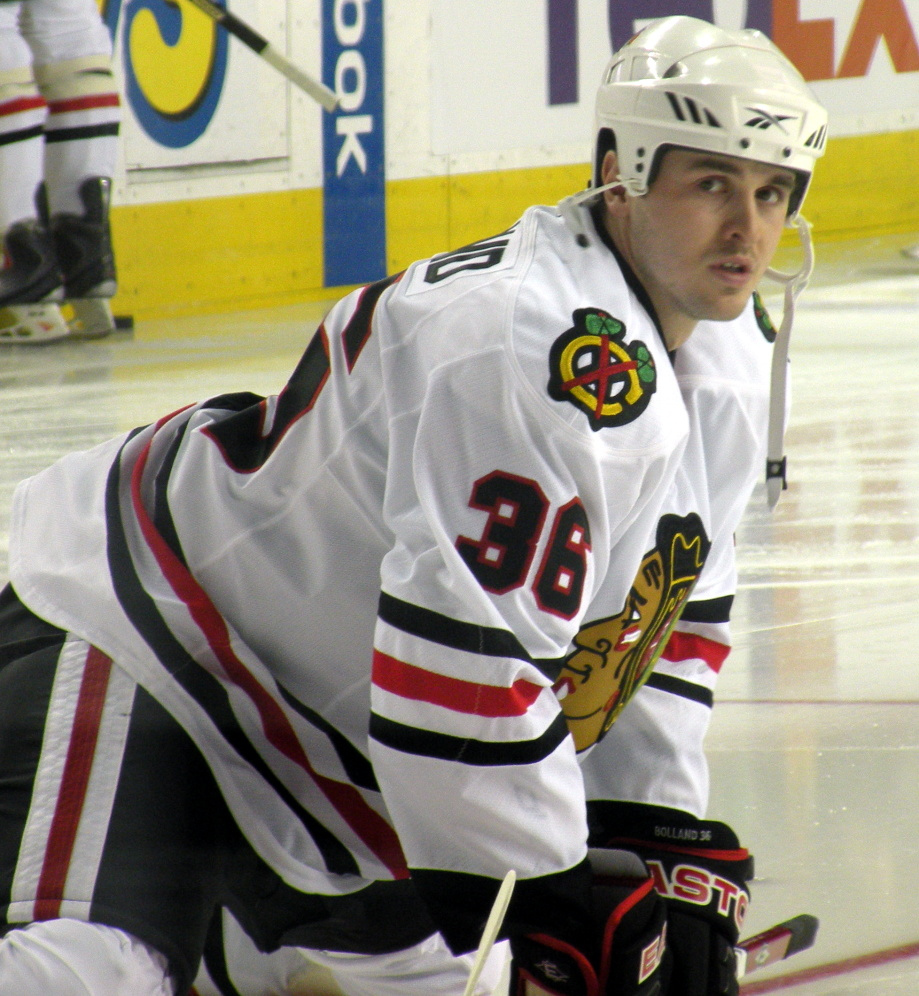
Dave Bolland won a gold medal in 2006.

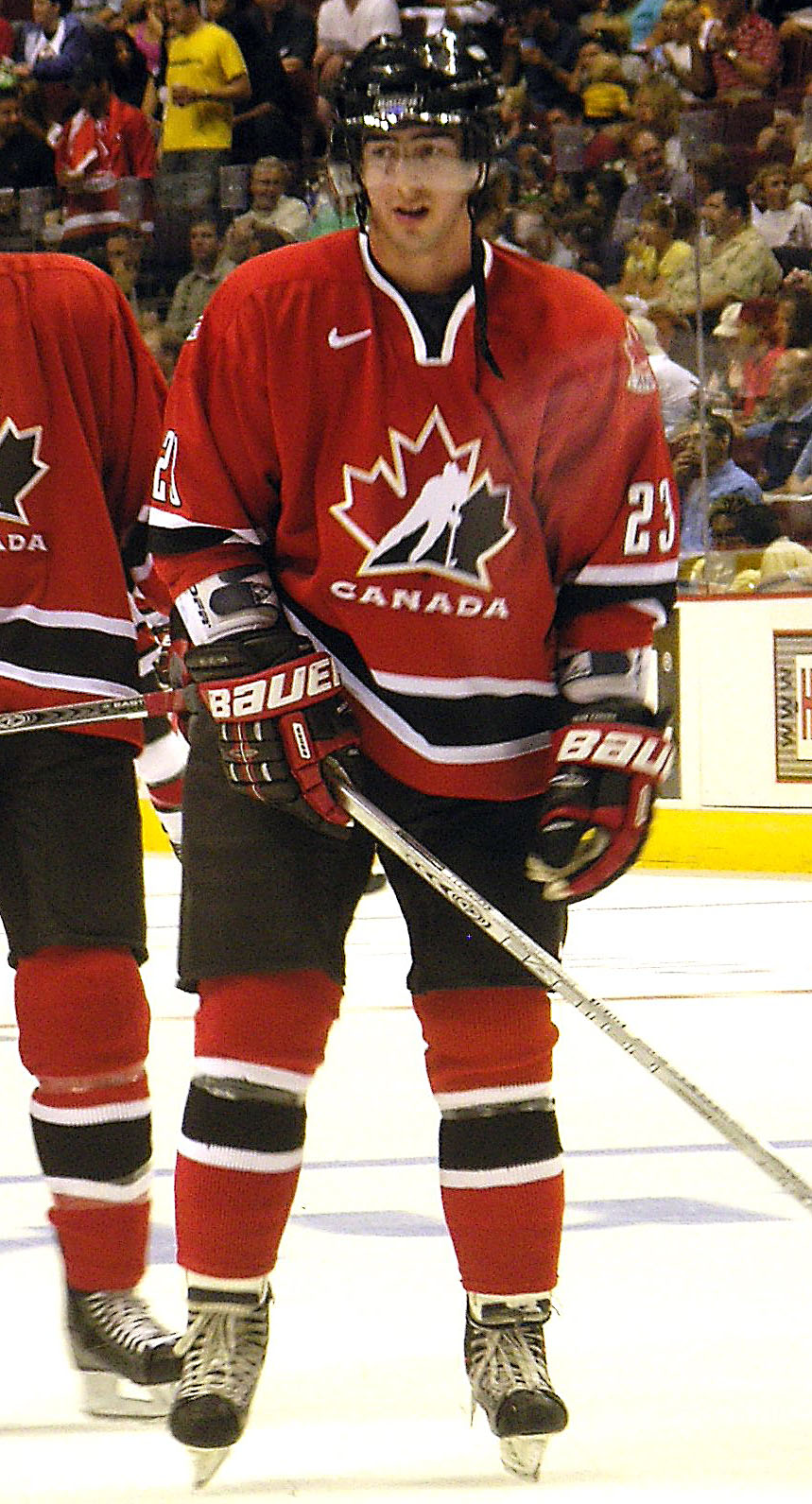
Luc Bourdon played in 2006 and 2007, winning two gold medals.

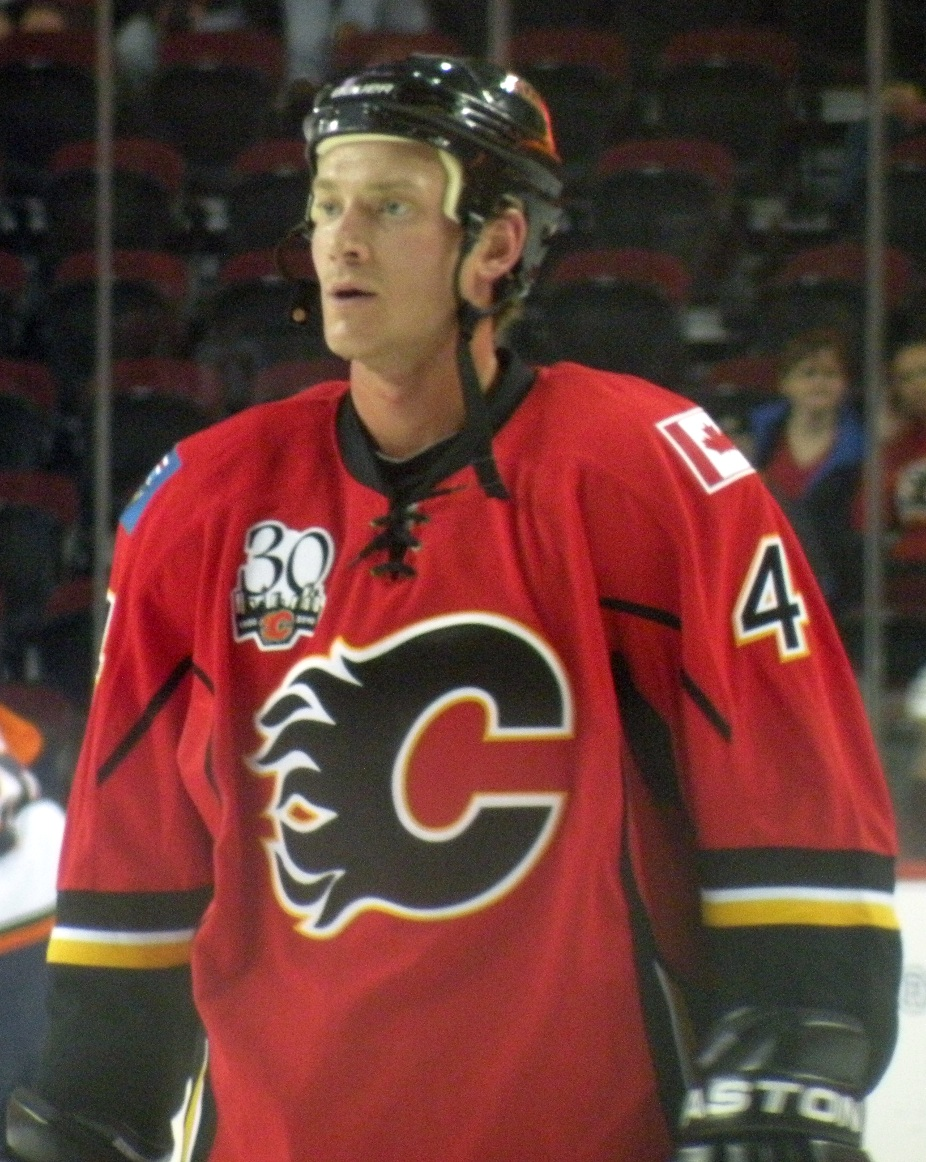
Jay Bouwmeester played in 2000, 2001 and 2002, winning a silver and two bronze medals.

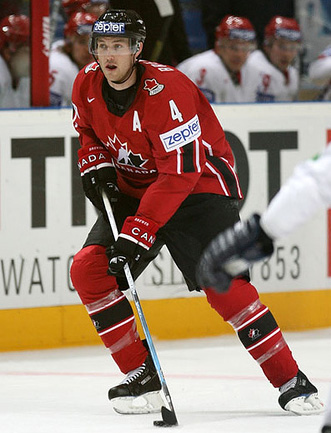
Eric Brewer played for the 1998 team.

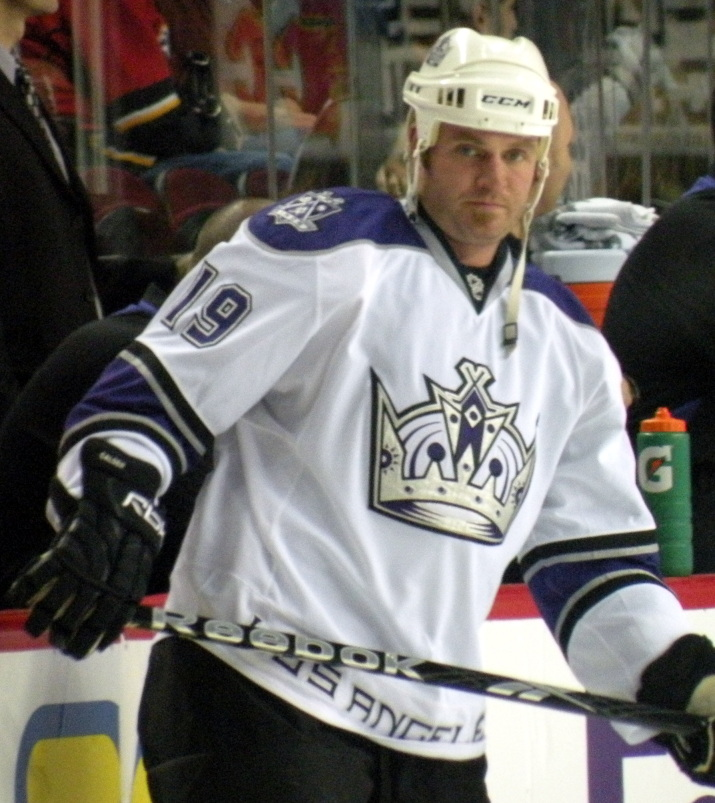
Kyle Calder won a silver medal in 1999.

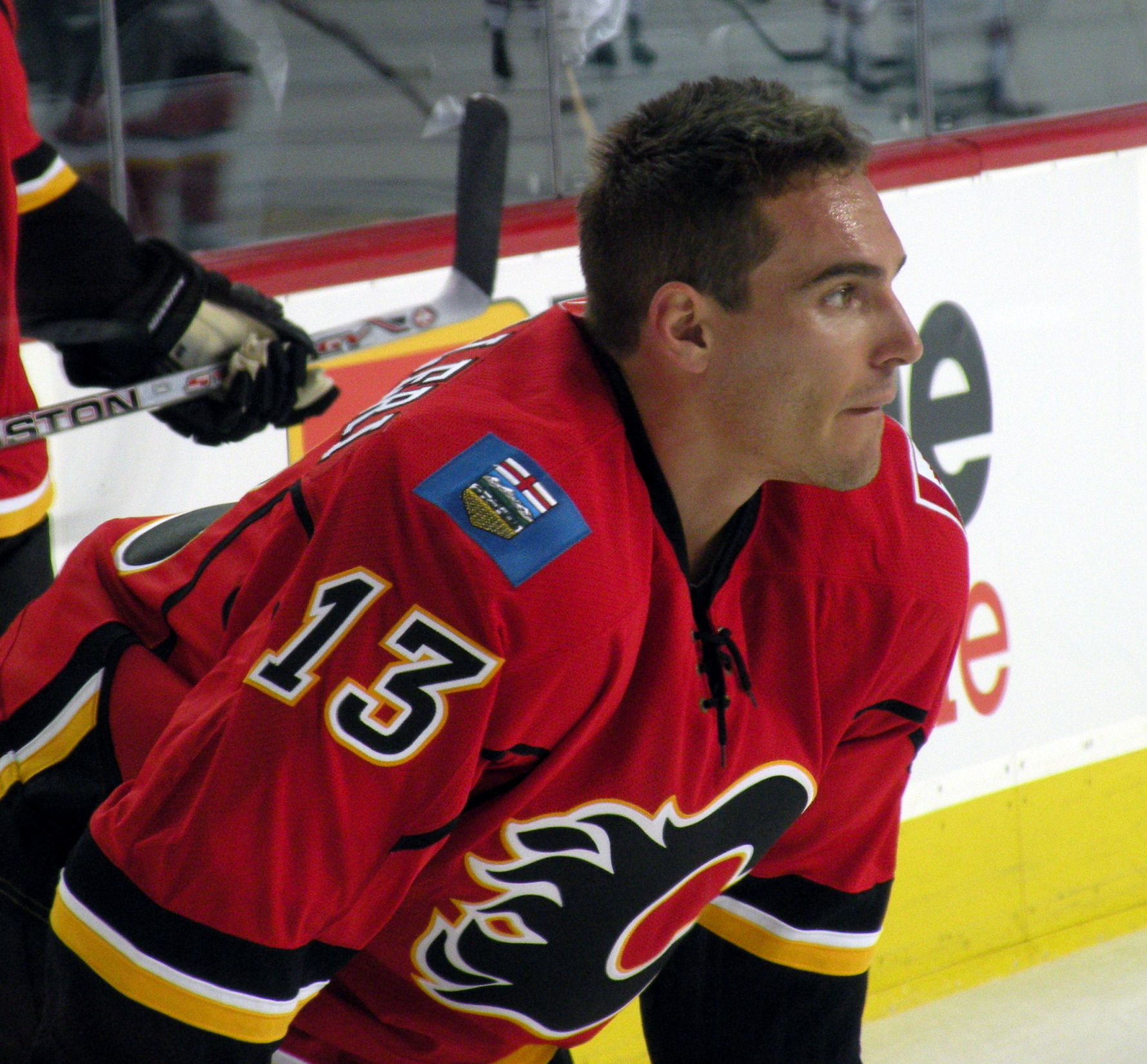
Mike Cammalleri won a bronze medal in 2001 and a silver medal in 2002. He was named Best Forward in 2002.

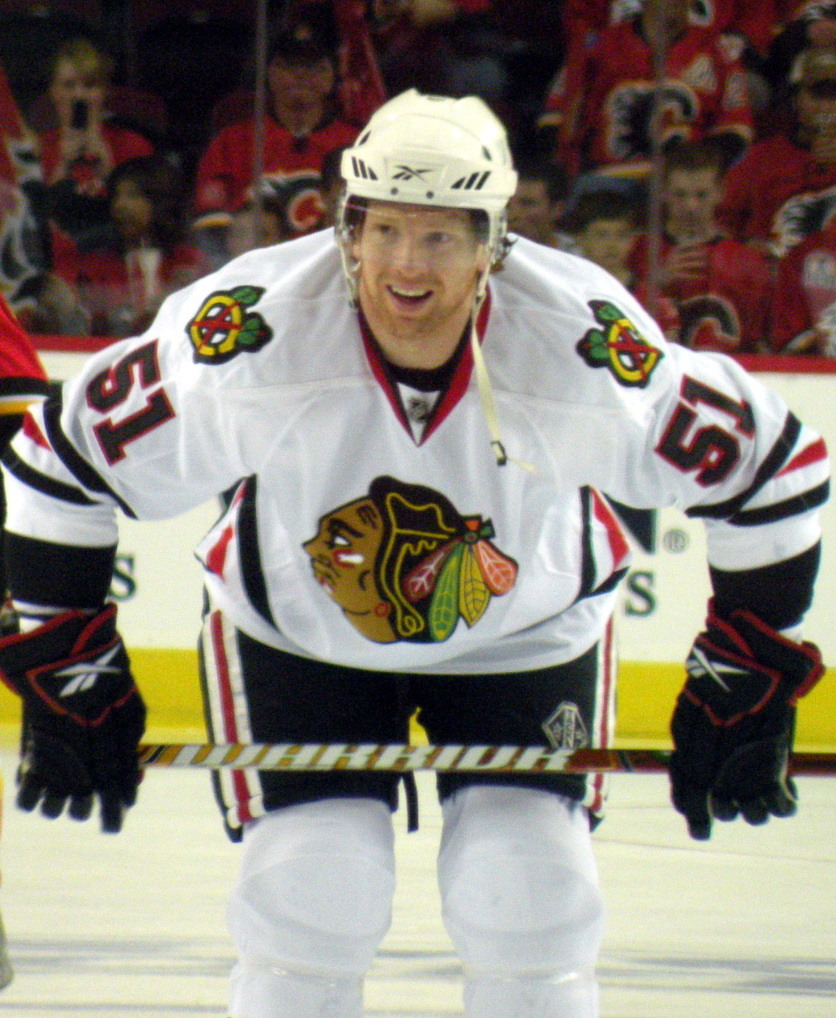
Brian Campbell won a silver medal in 1999.

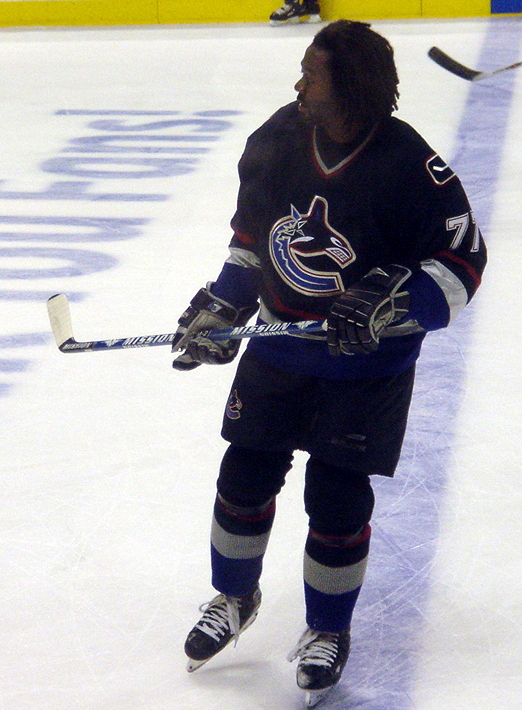
Anson Carter won a gold medal in 1994.

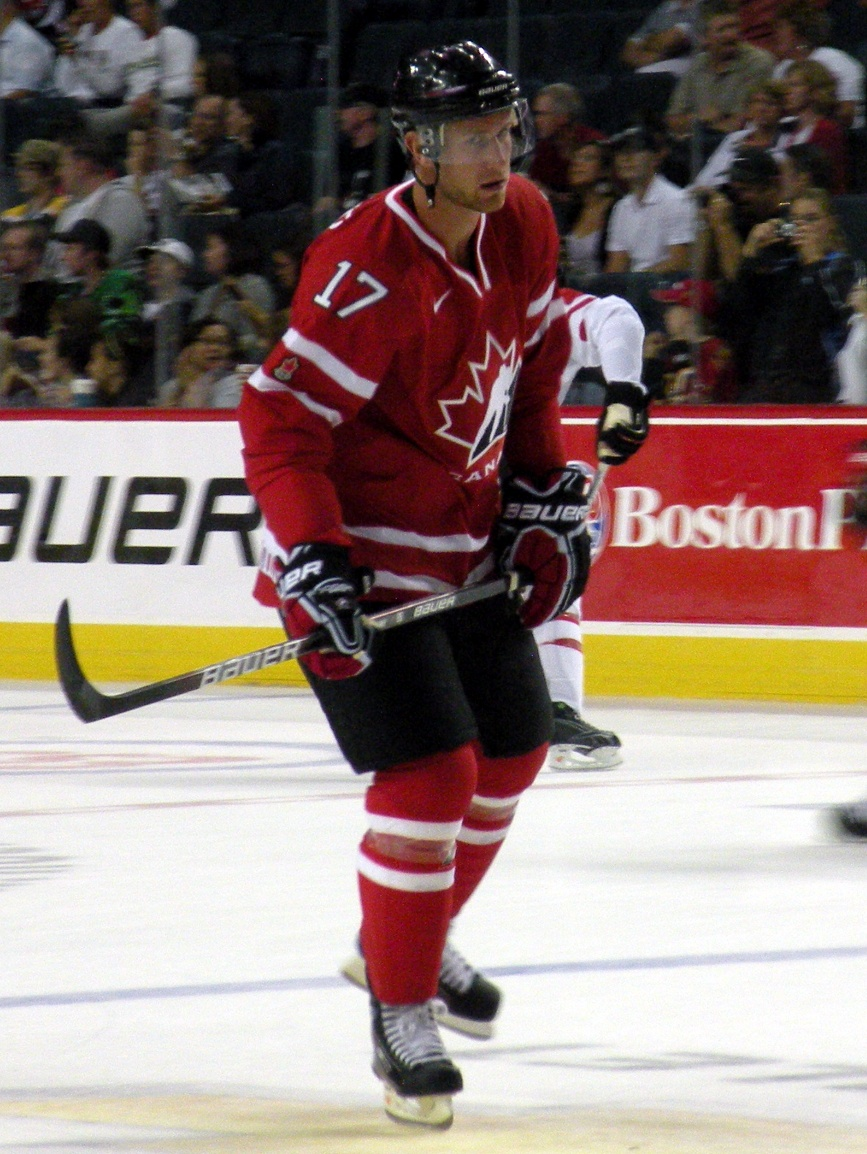
Jeff Carter played in 2004 and 2005, winning a gold and a silver medal.

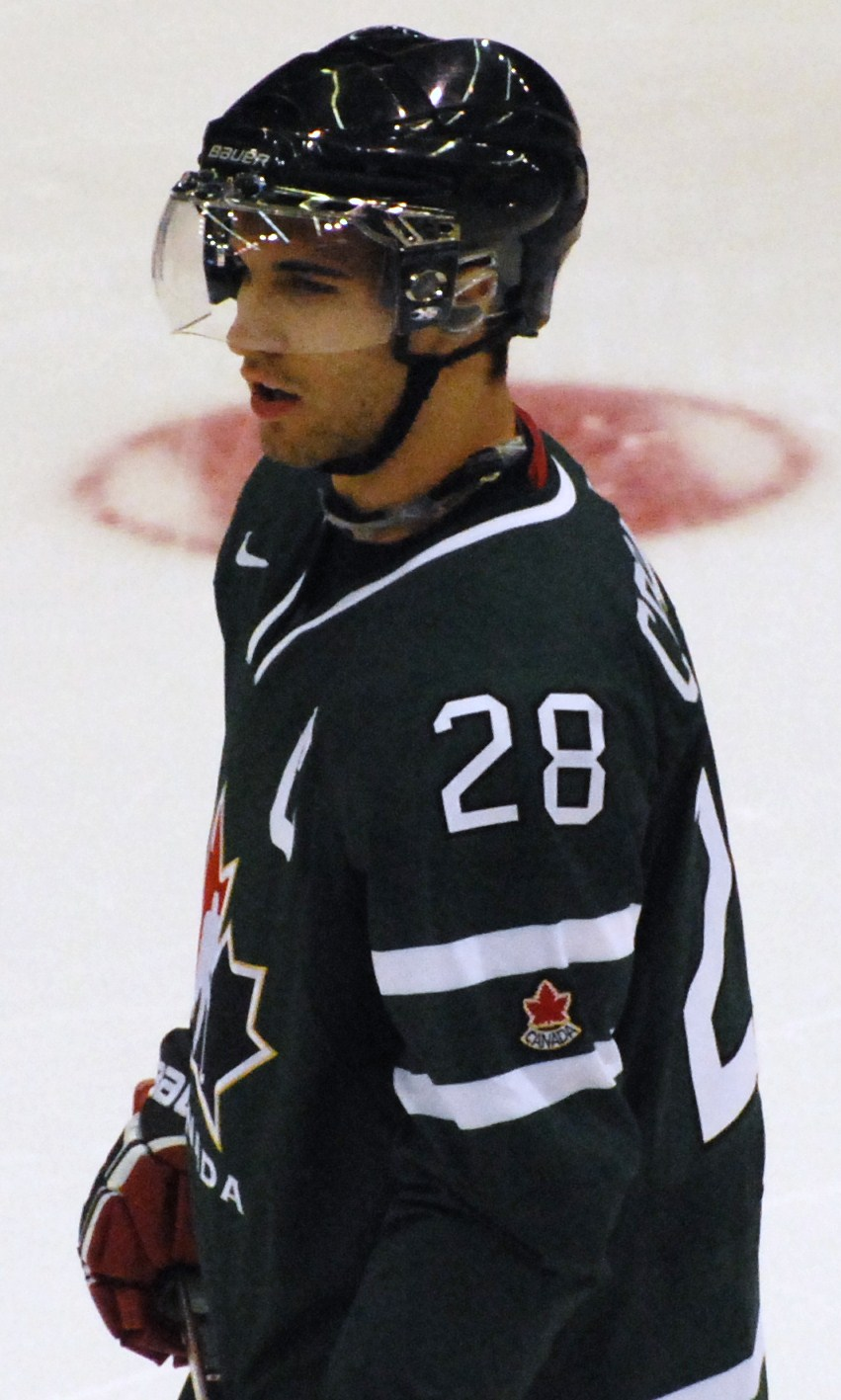
Patrice Cormier won a gold medal in 2009, and captained the 2010 team to a silver medal.

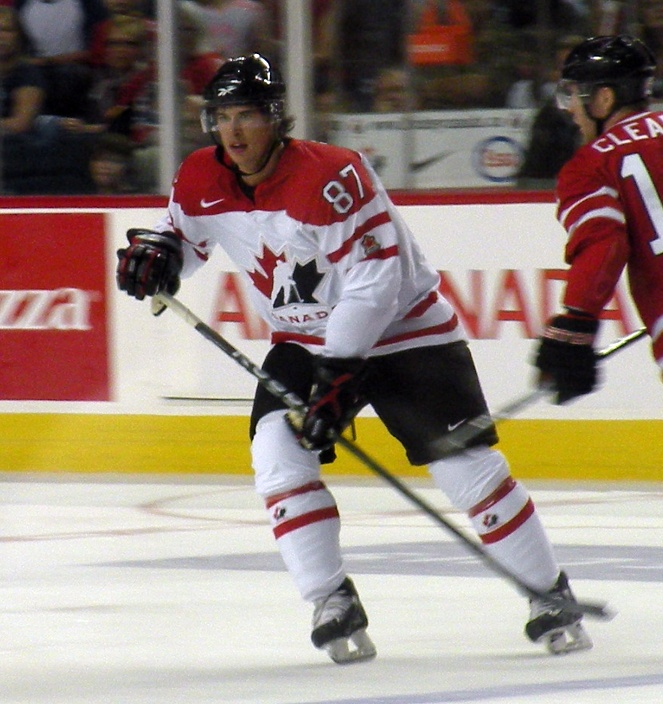
Sidney Crosby played in 2004 and 2005, winning a gold and a silver medal.

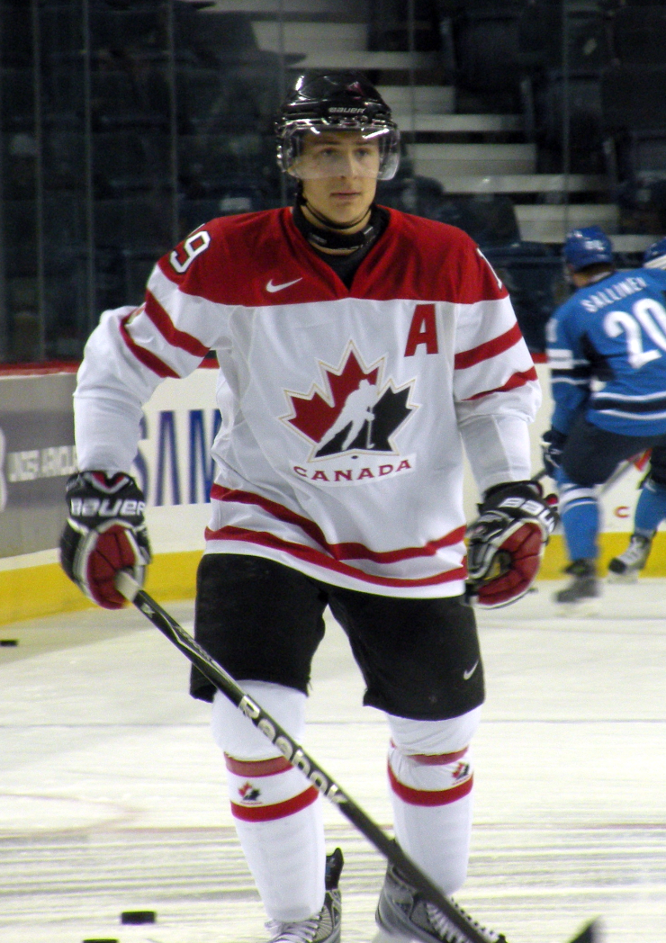
Stefan Della Rovere won a gold medal in 2009 and a silver medal in 2010.

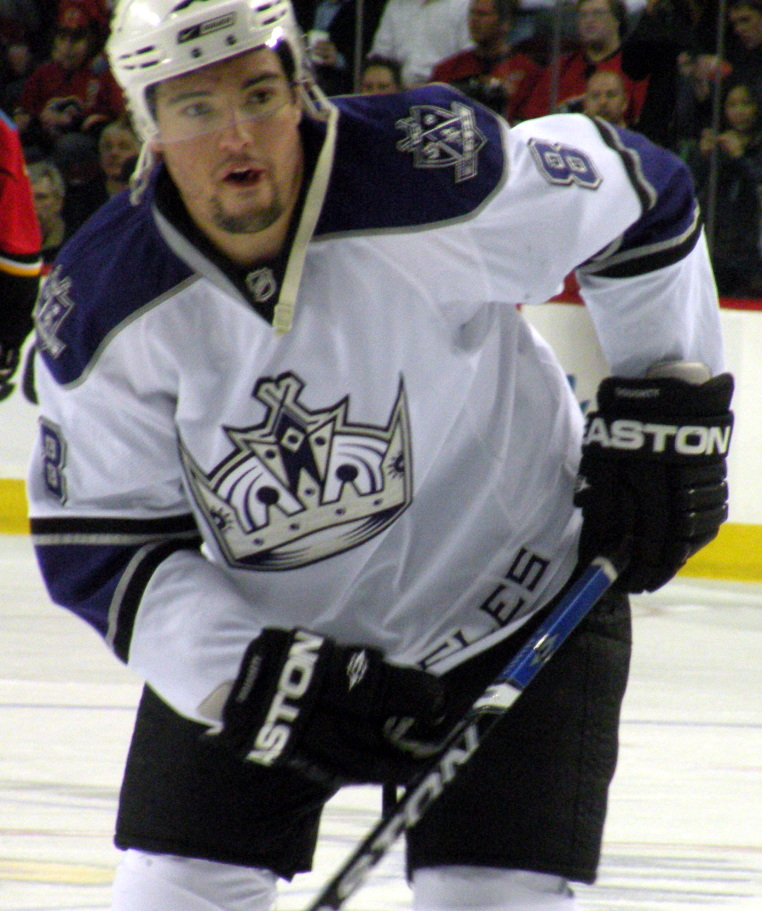
Drew Doughty won a gold medal in 2008 and was named Best Defenceman.

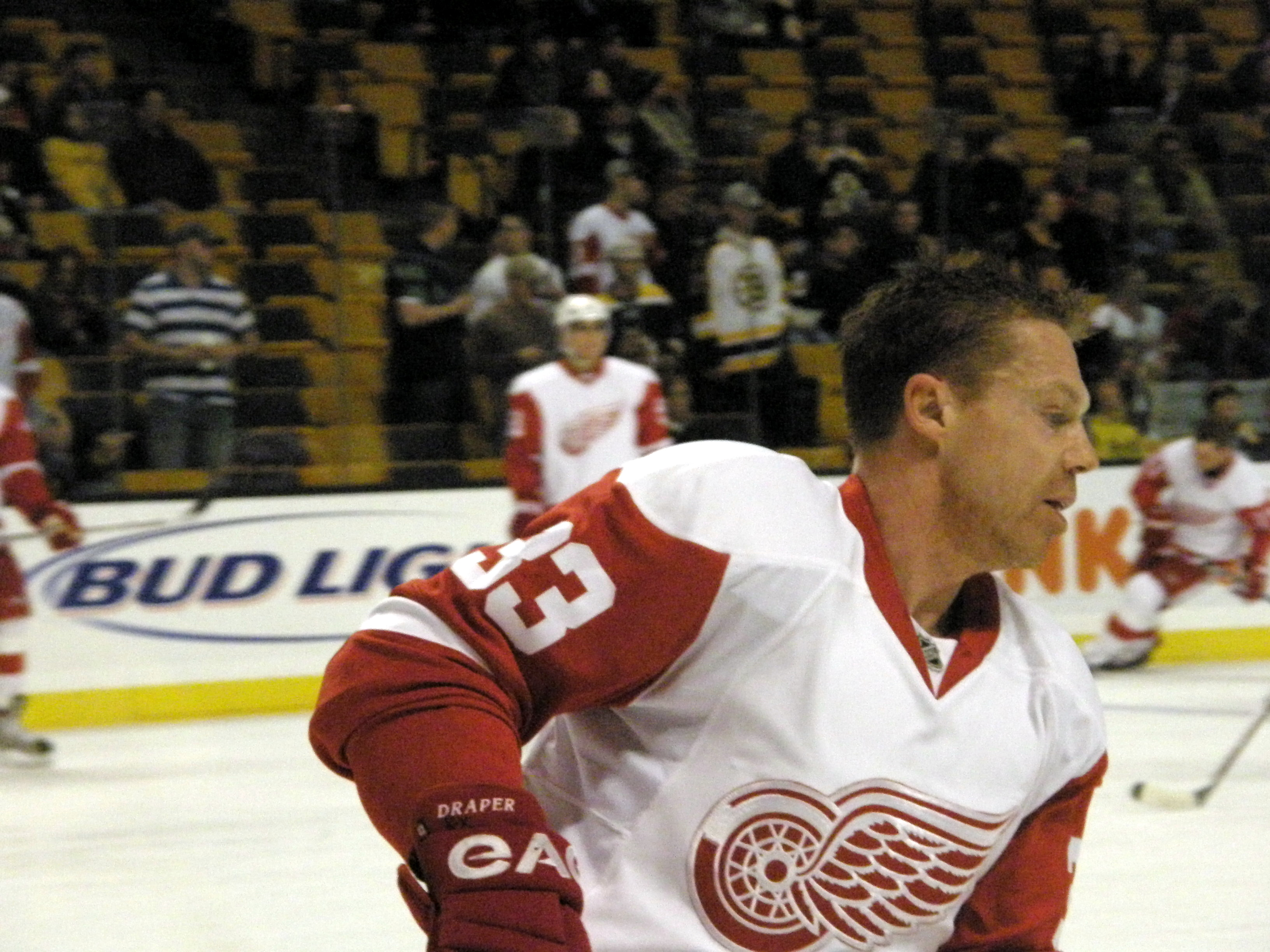
Kris Draper won gold medals in 1990 and 1991.

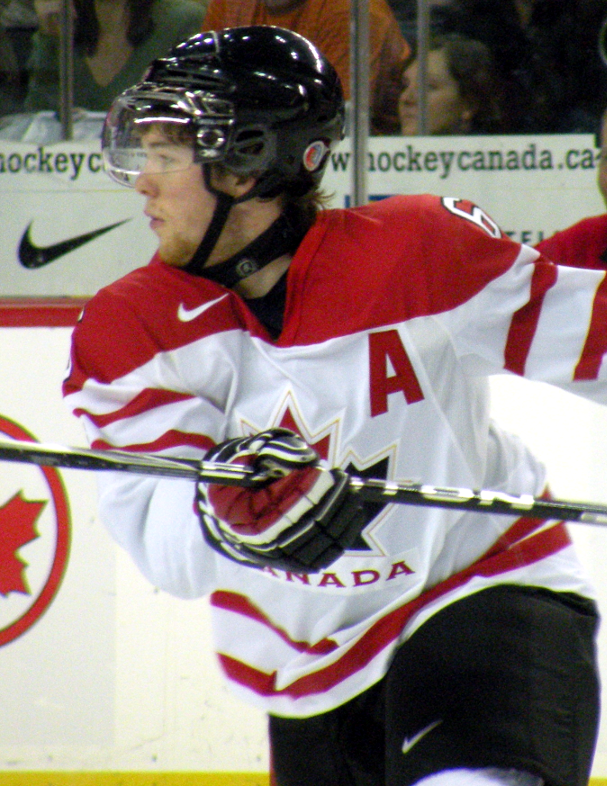
Ryan Ellis played in 2009, 2010 and 2011, winning a gold and two silver medals.

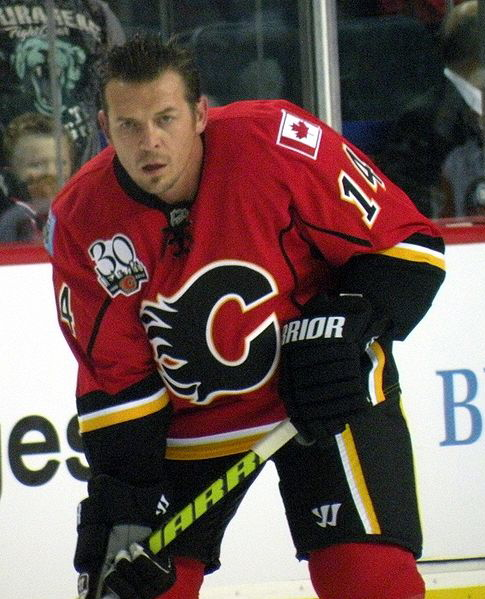
Theoren Fleury played for the 1987 team that was disqualified. He returned in 1988 to captain the team to a gold medal.

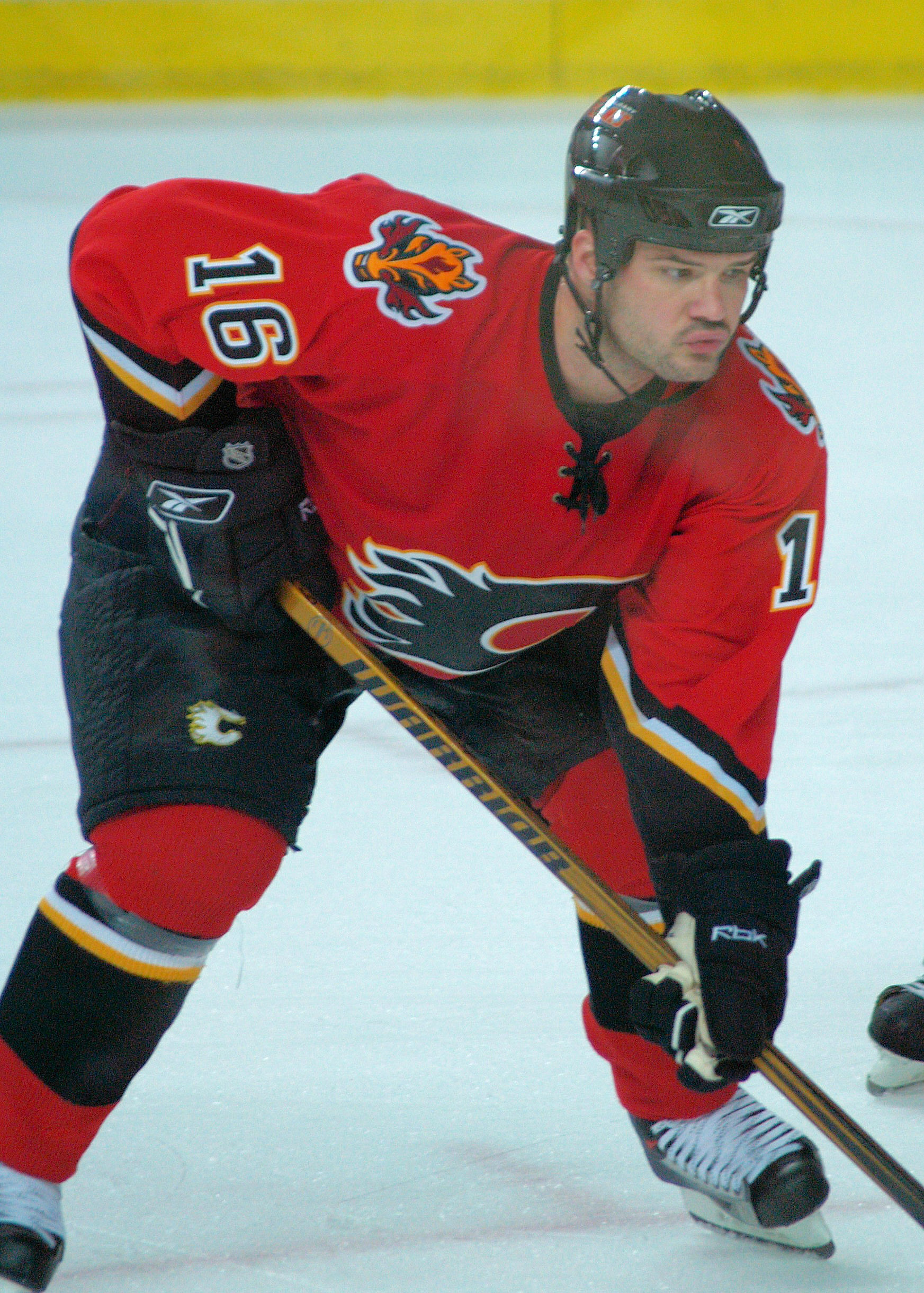
Jeff Friesen won gold medals in 1994 and 1995.

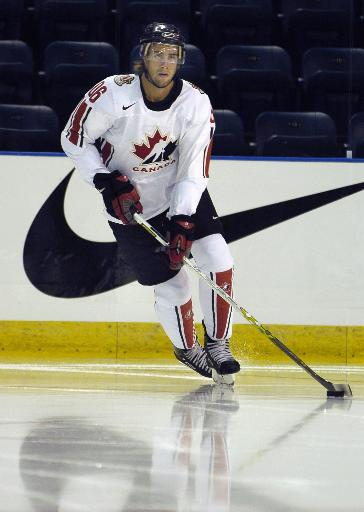
Simon Gagné won a silver medal at the 1999 tournament.

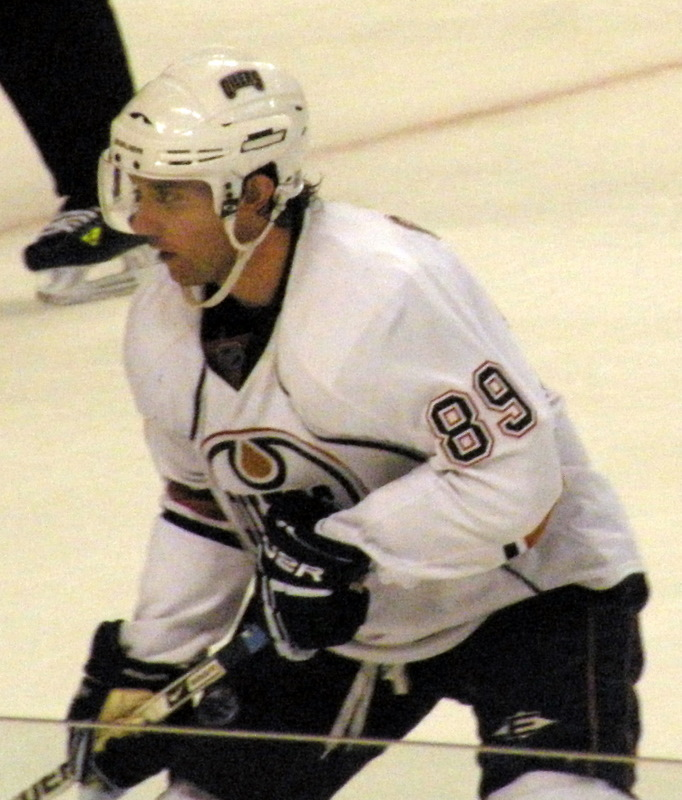
Sam Gagner won a gold medal in 2007.

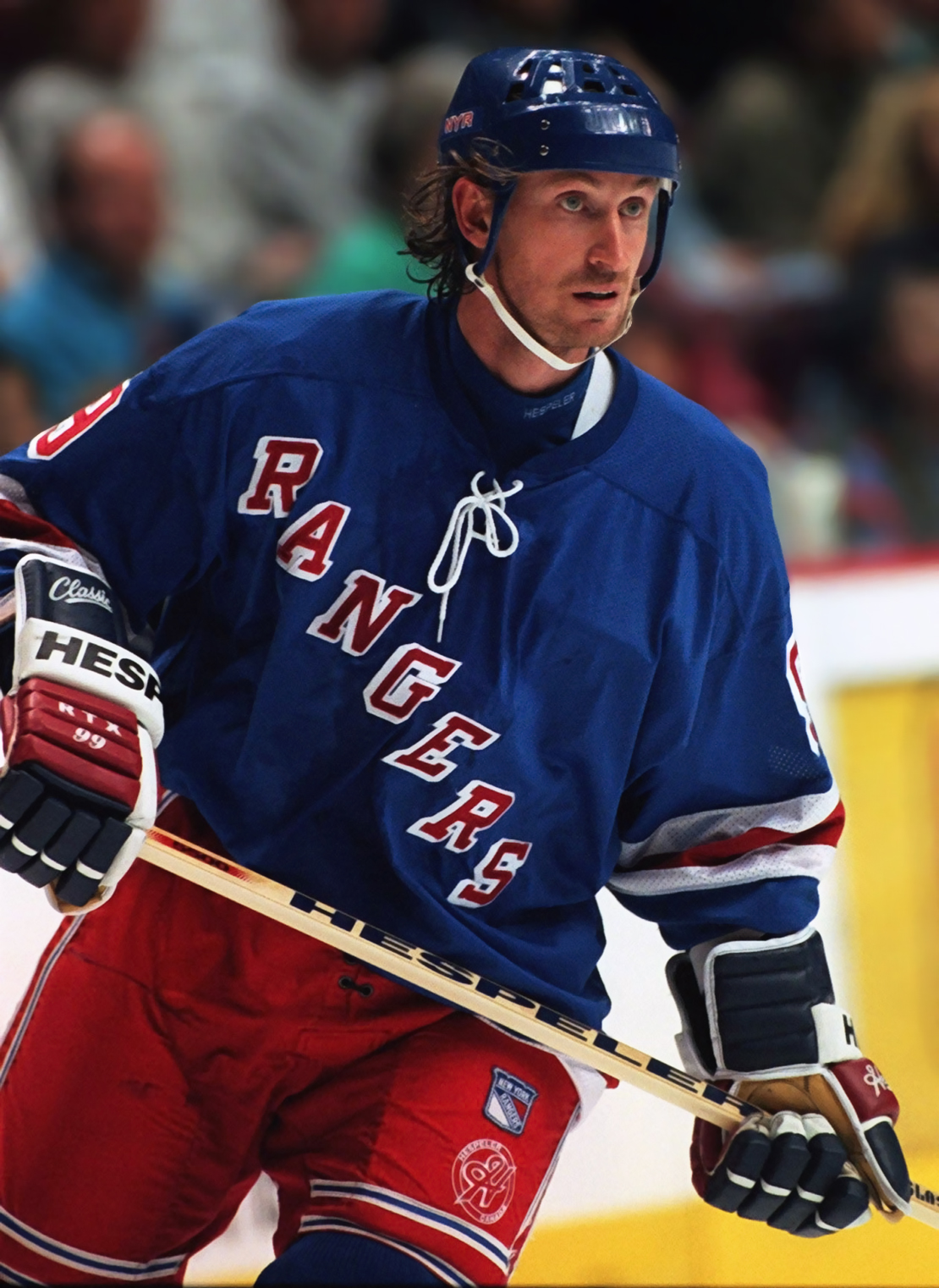
Wayne Gretzky won a bronze medal in 1978 and was named Best Forward.

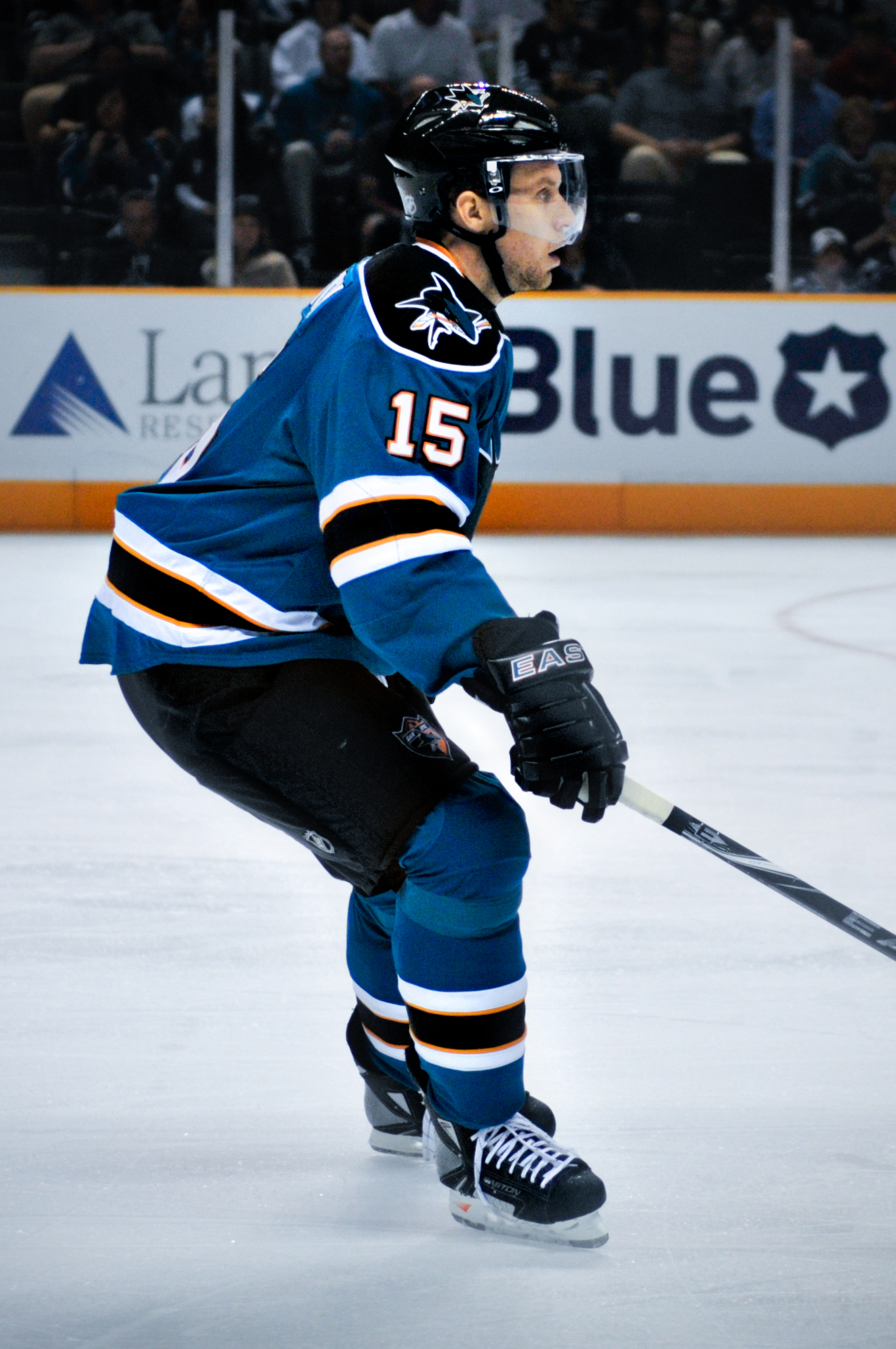
Dany Heatley won bronze medals in 2000 and 2001.

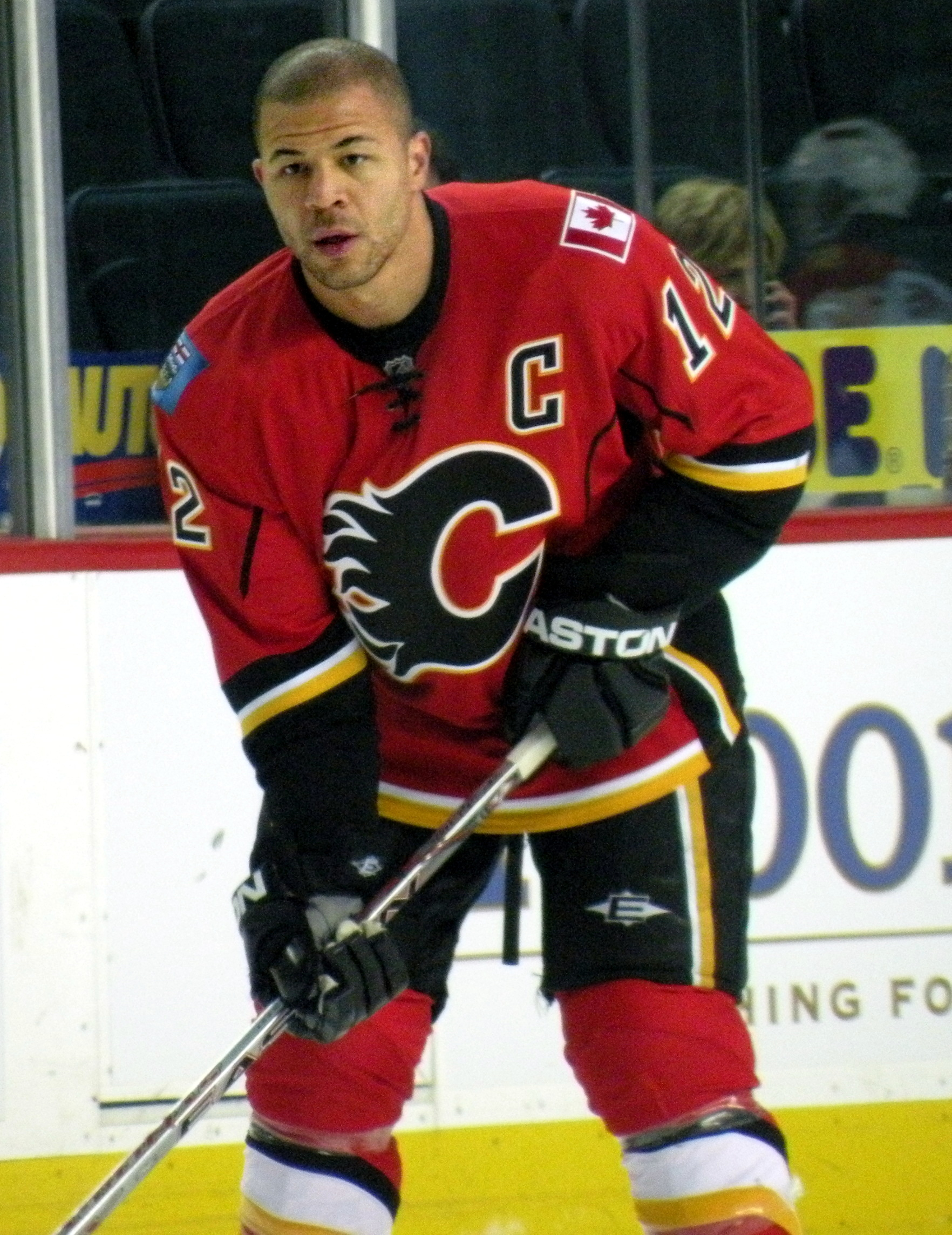
Jarome Iginla won a gold medal in the 1996 tournament and was named Best Forward.

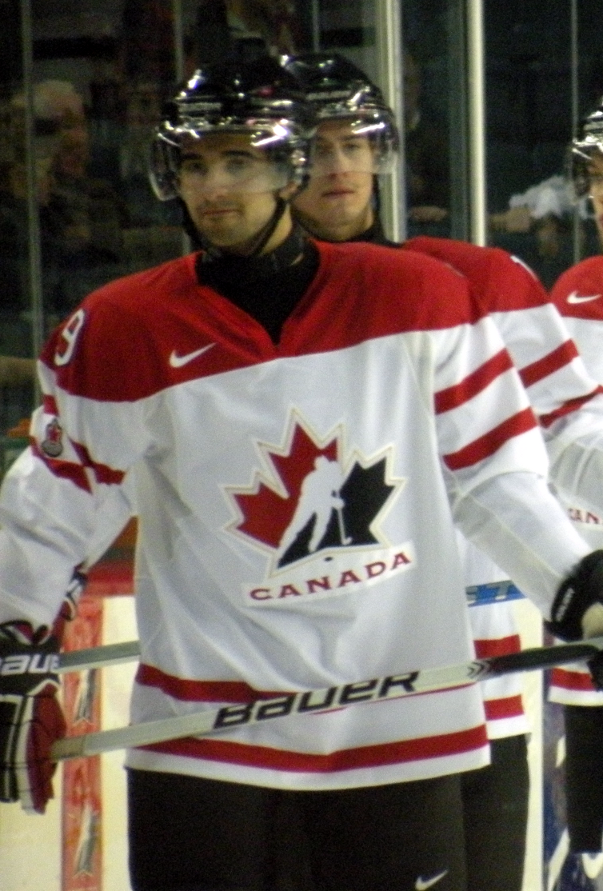
Nazem Kadri played in 2010, and won a silver medal.

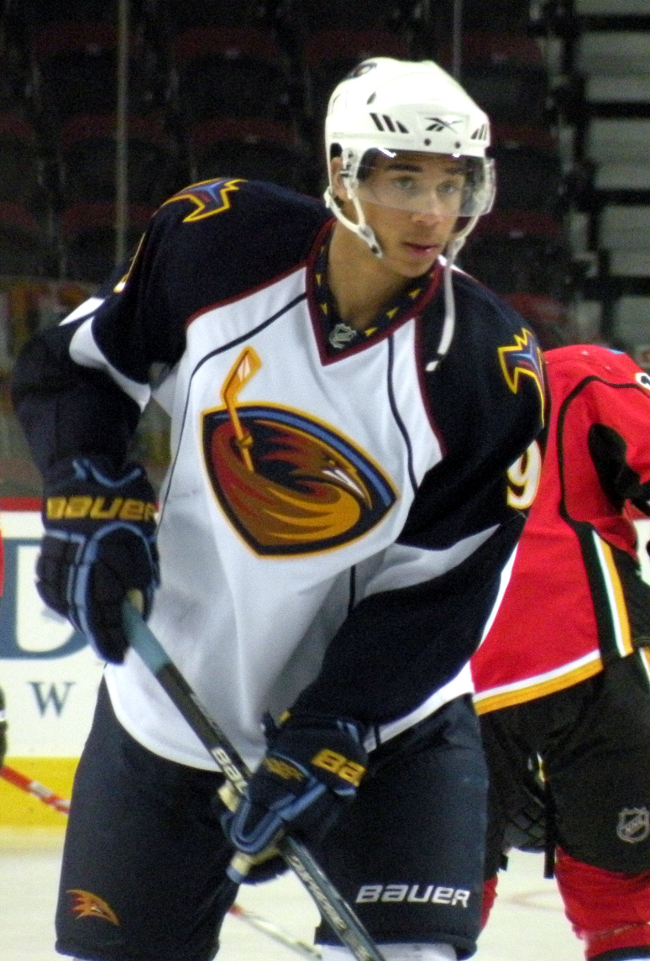
Evander Kane won a gold medal at the 2009 tournament.

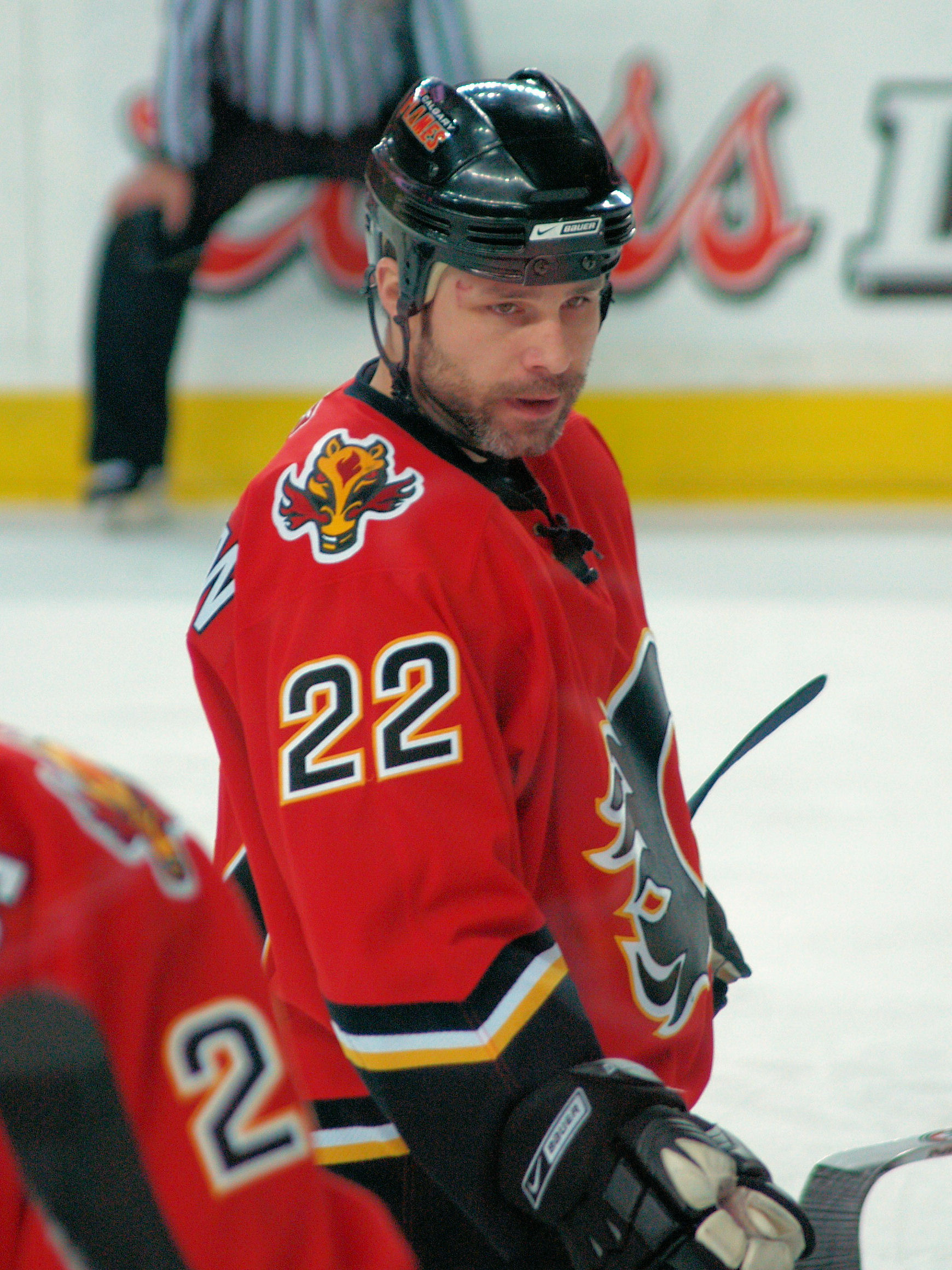
Daymond Langkow won a gold medal in 1996.

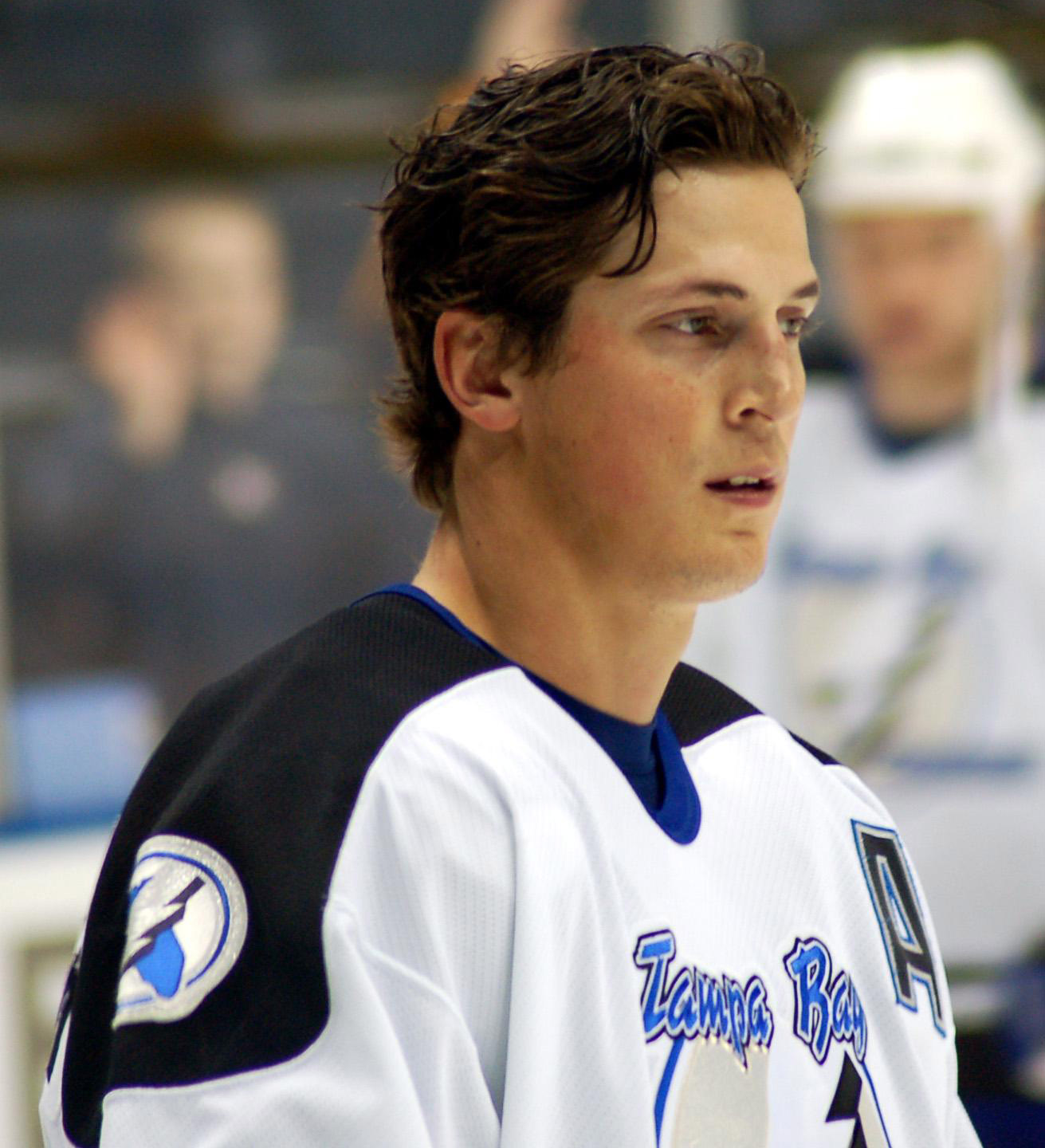
Vincent Lecavalier played in the 1998 tournament.

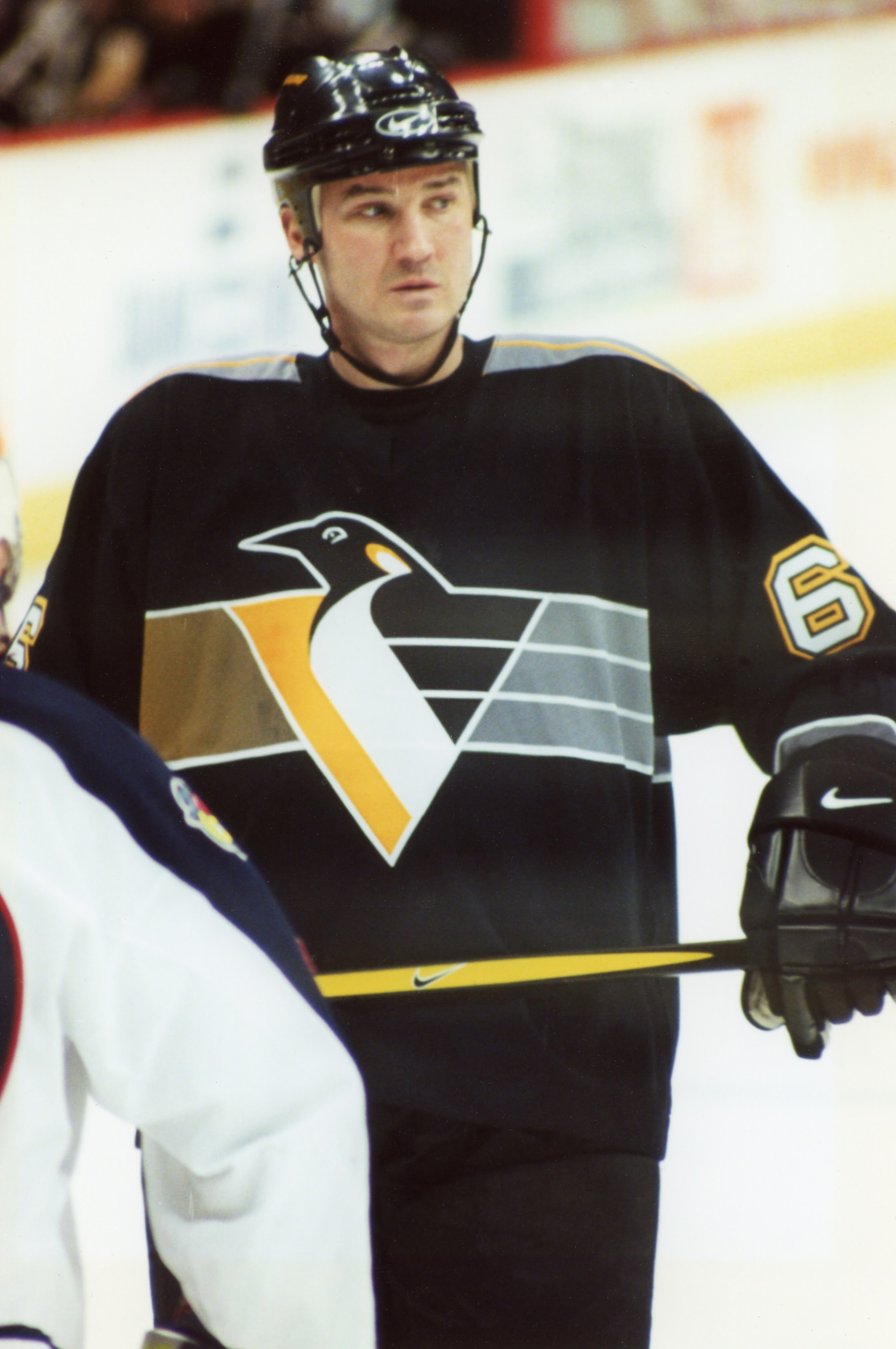
Mario Lemieux won a bronze medal at the 1983 tournament.

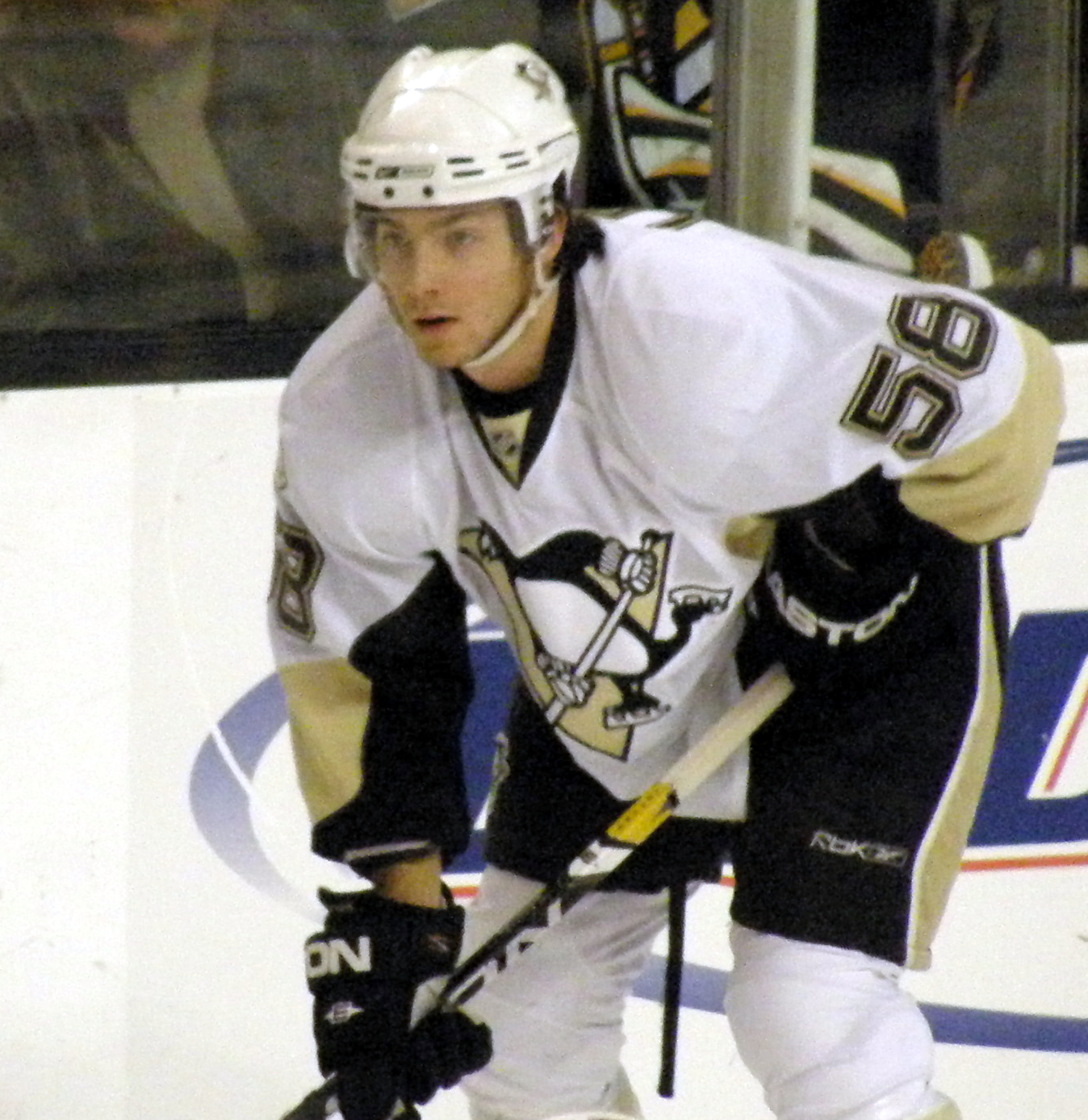
Kris Letang won a gold medal in 2006, and captained the 2007 team to a gold medal.

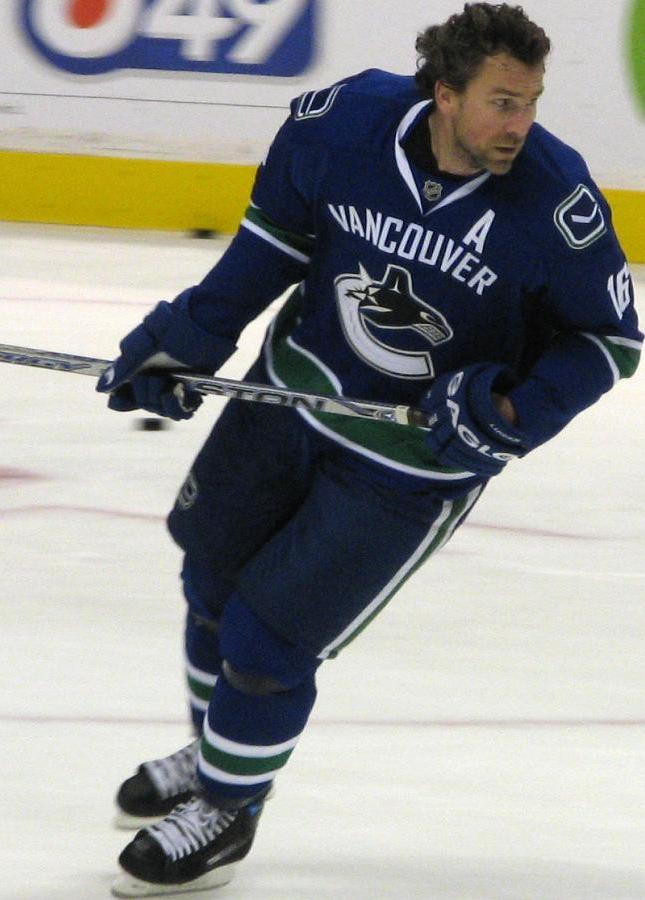
Trevor Linden won a gold medal in 1988.

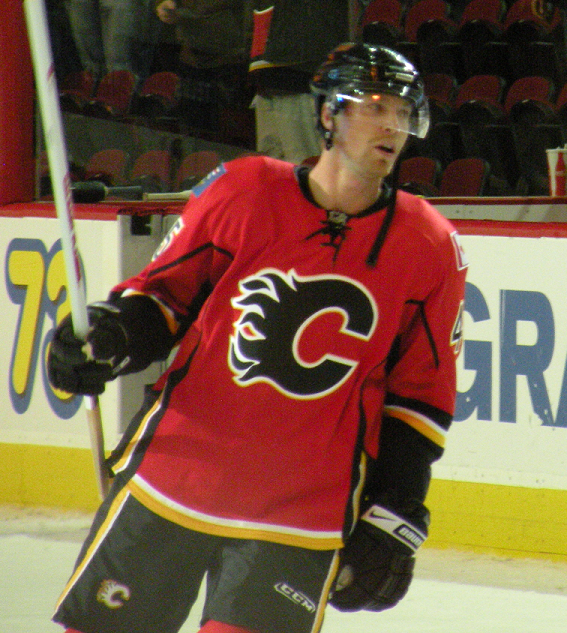
Jamie Lundmark won bronze medals in 2000 and 2001.

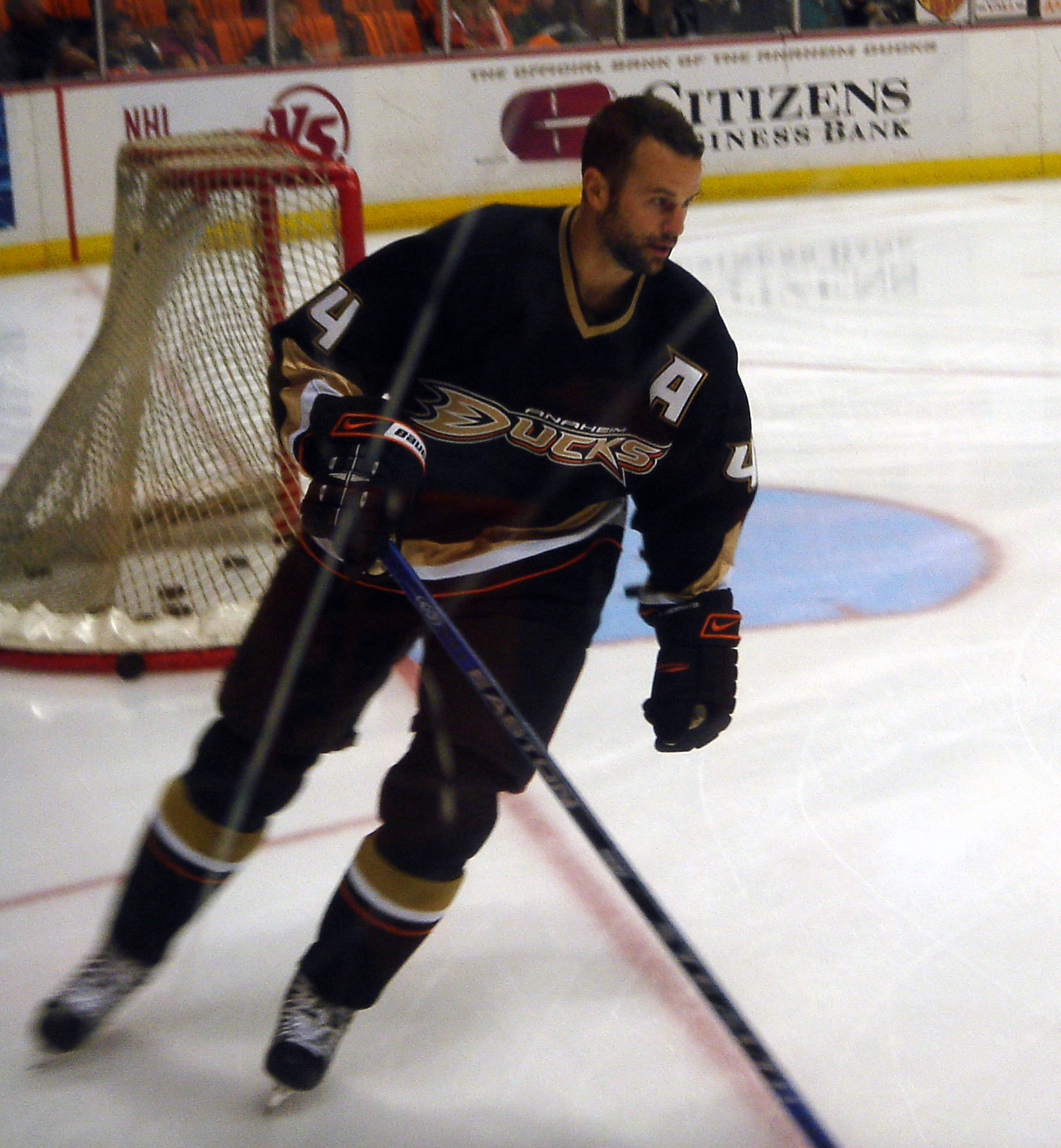
Rob Niedermayer won a gold medal with the 1993 team.

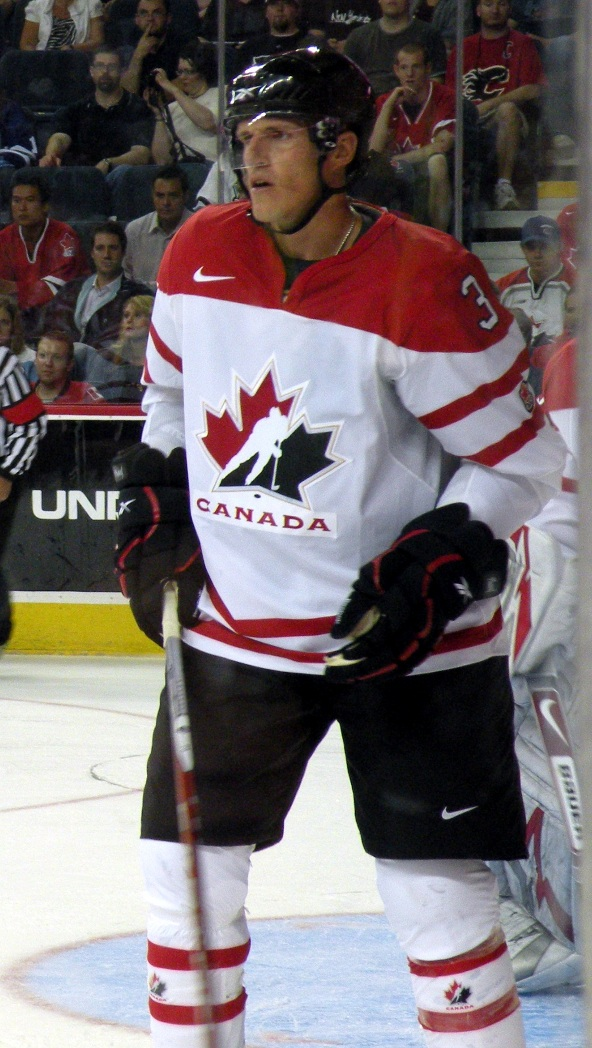
Dion Phaneuf played in 2004 and 2005, winning a gold and a silver medal.

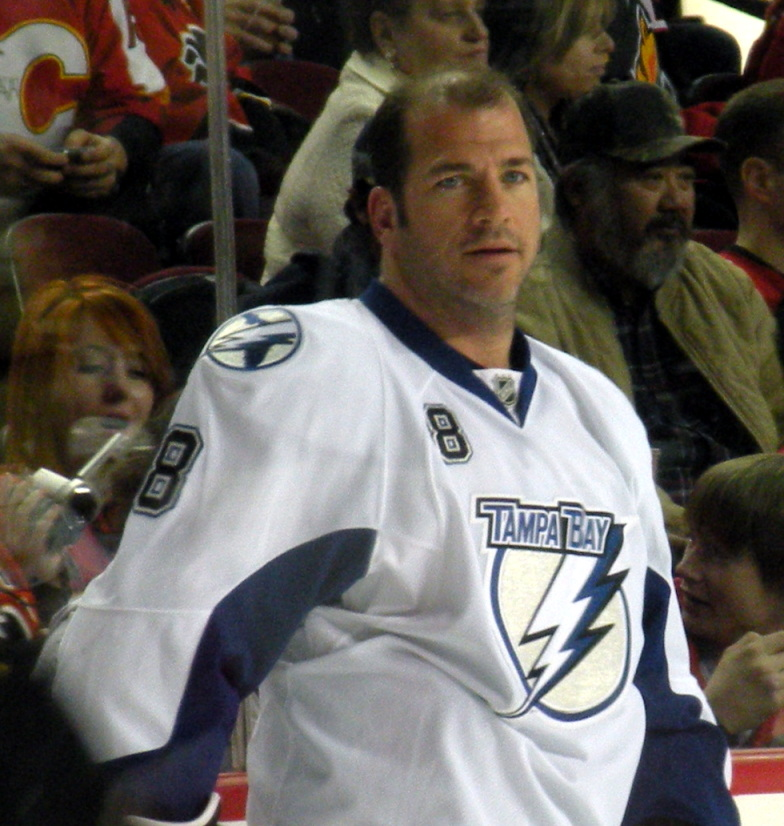
Mark Recchi won a gold medal in 1988.

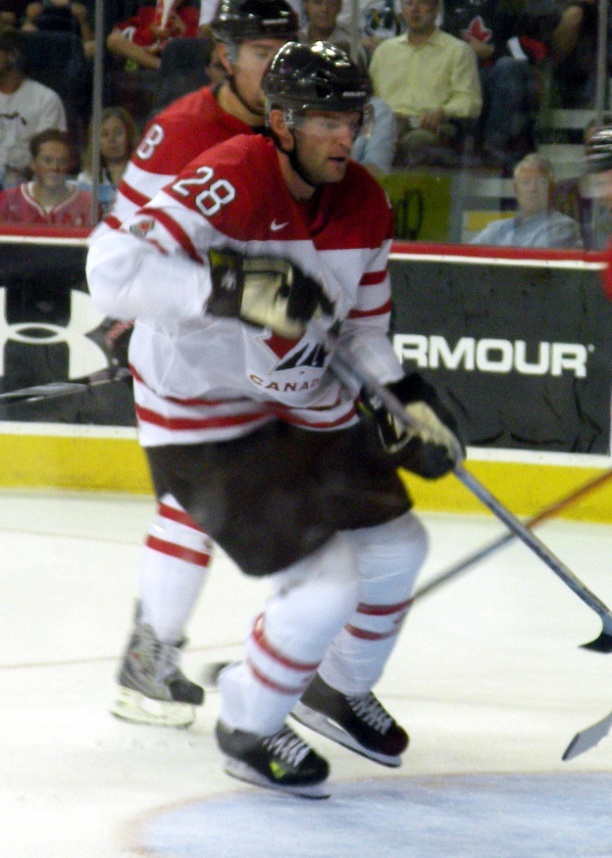
Robyn Regehr played in 1998 and won a silver medal.

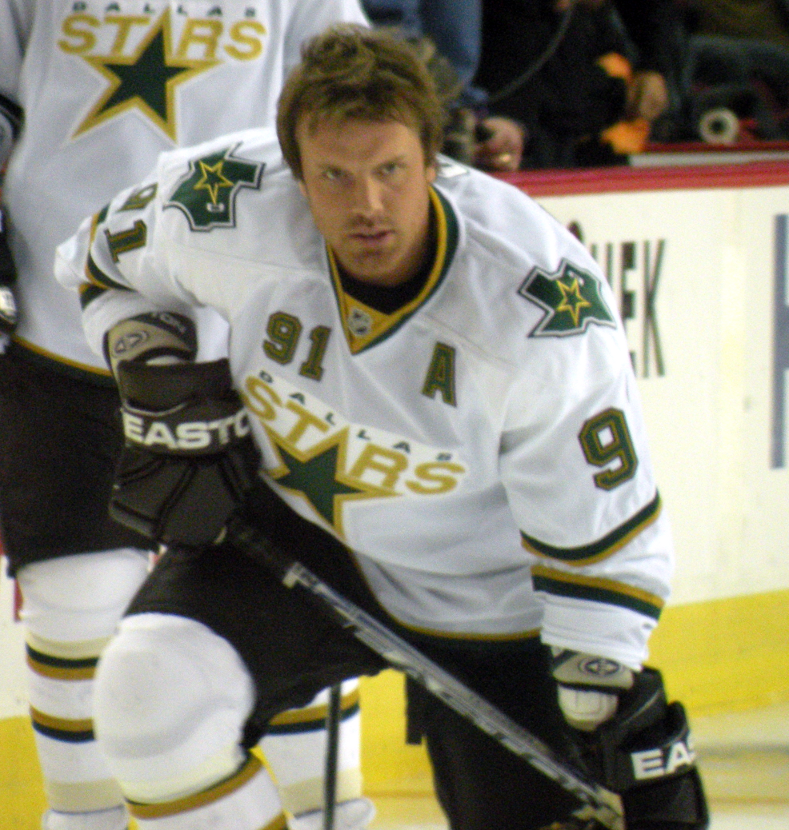
Brad Richards won a bronze medal in 2000.

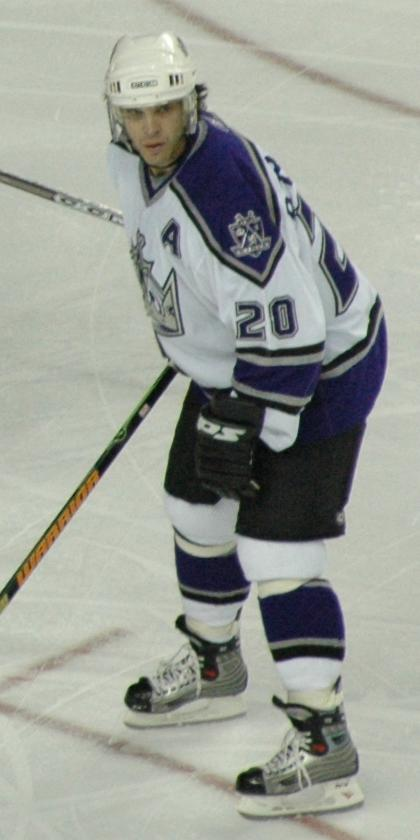
Luc Robitaille won a silver medal in 1986.

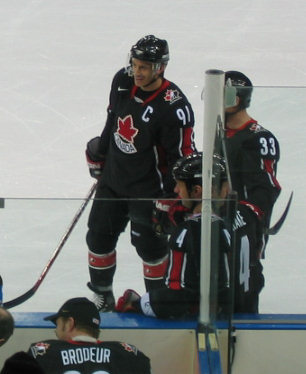
Joe Sakic won a gold medal in the 1988 tournament.

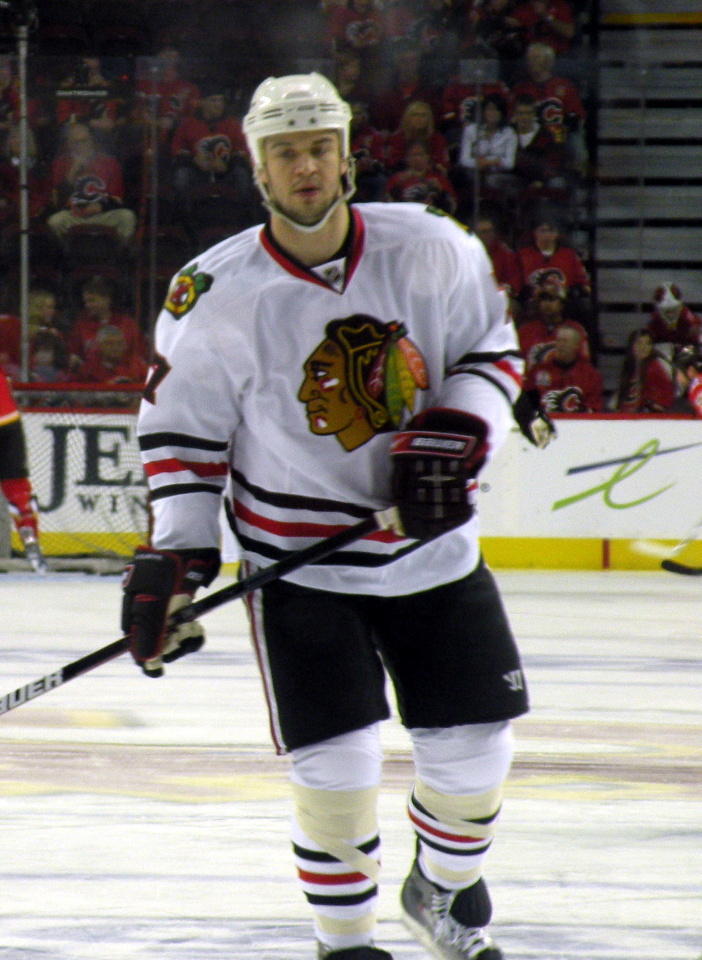
Brent Seabrook played in 2004 and 2005, winning a gold and a silver medal.

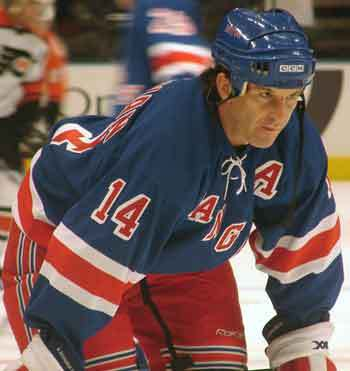
Brendan Shanahan played for the 1987 team that was disqualified.

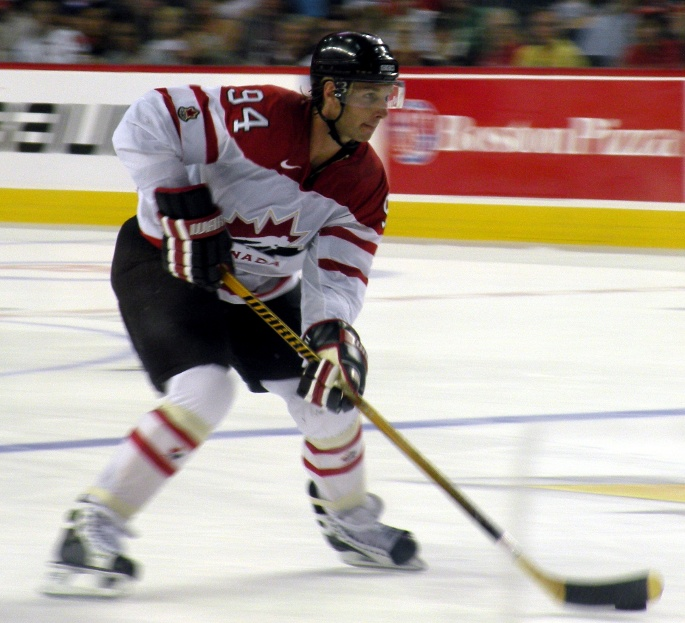
Ryan Smyth played in the 1995 tournament and won a gold medal.

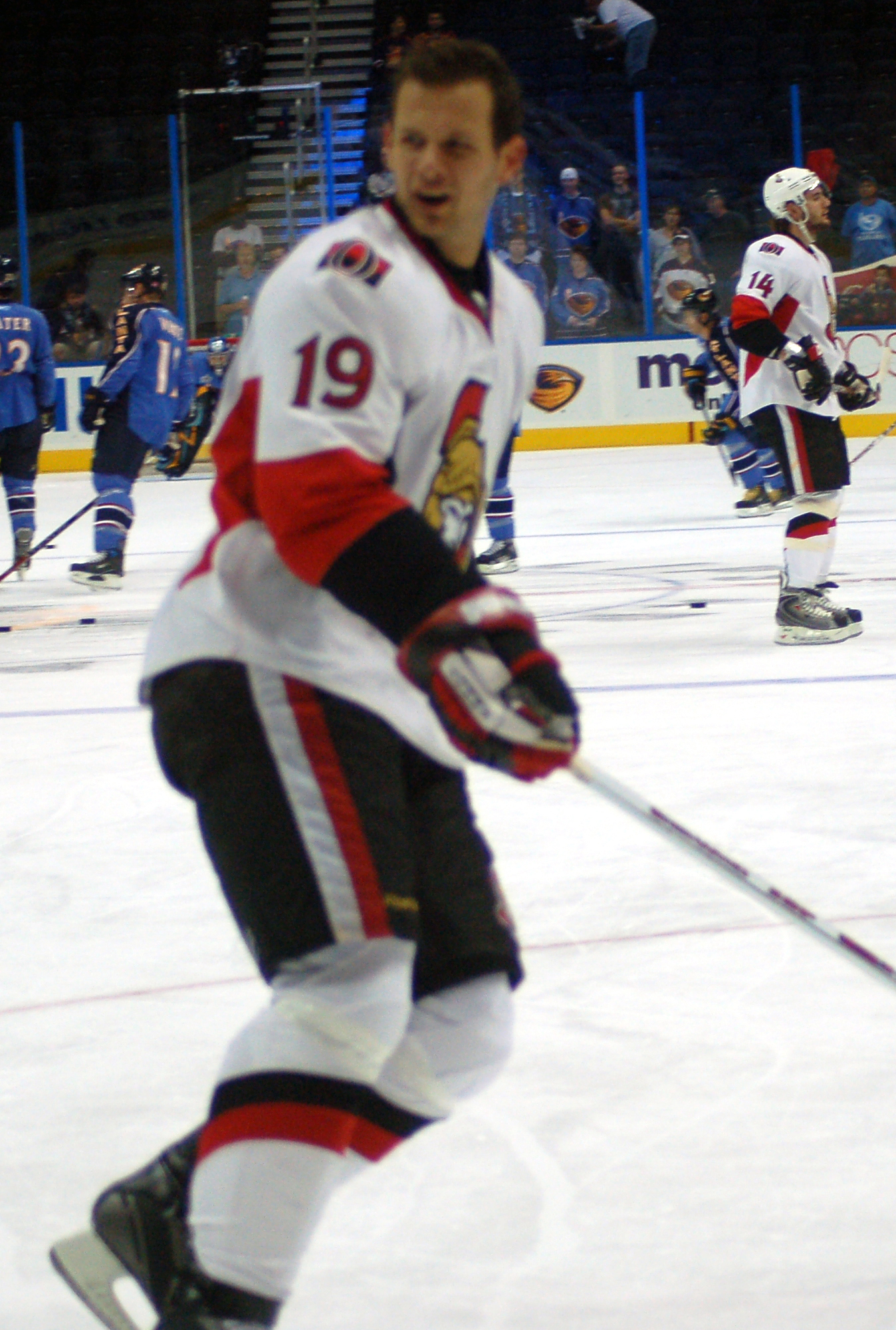
Jason Spezza played in 2000, 2001 and 2002, winning a silver and two bronze medals.

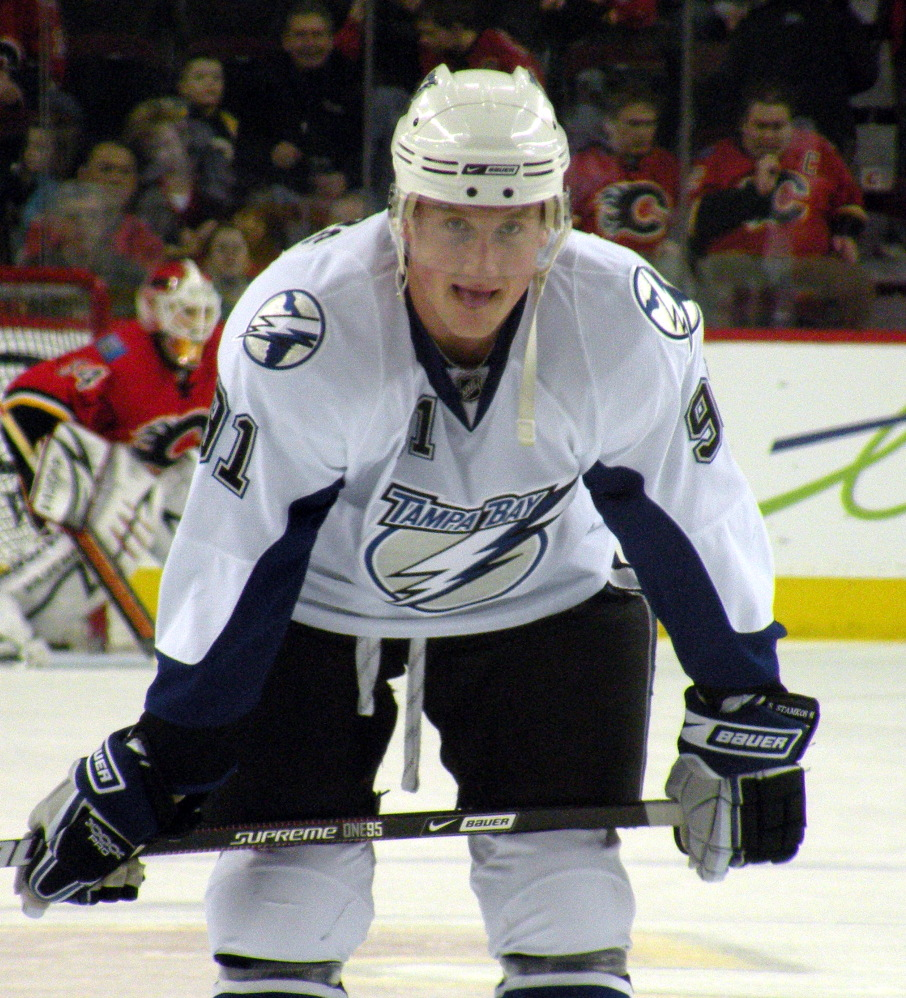
Steven Stamkos played in the 2008 tournament, winning a gold medal.

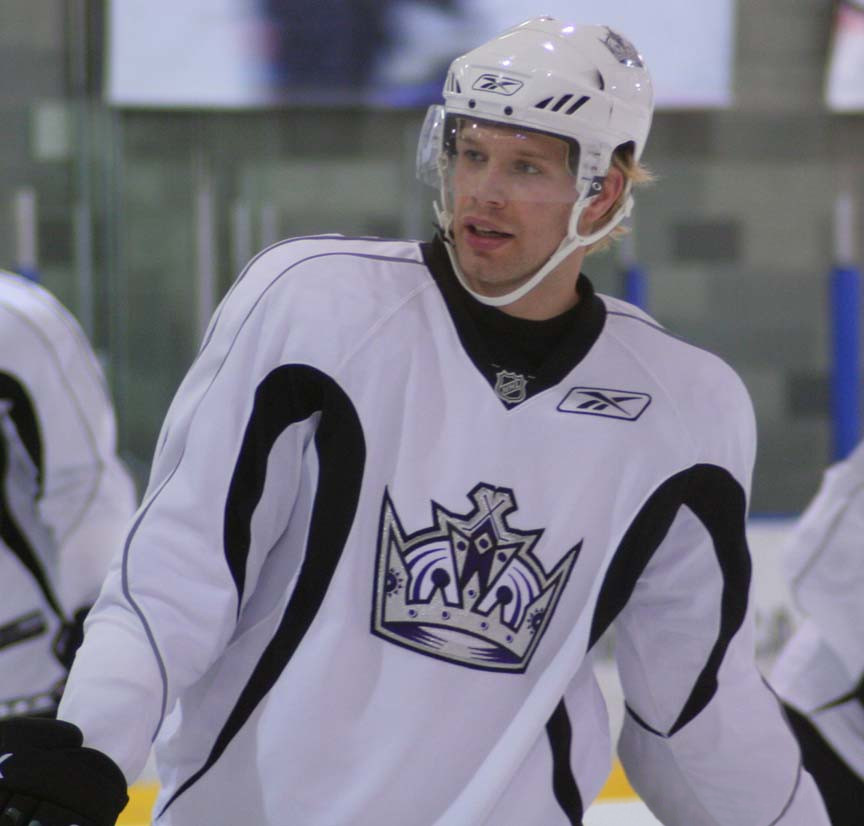
Brad Stuart won a silver medal in 1999.

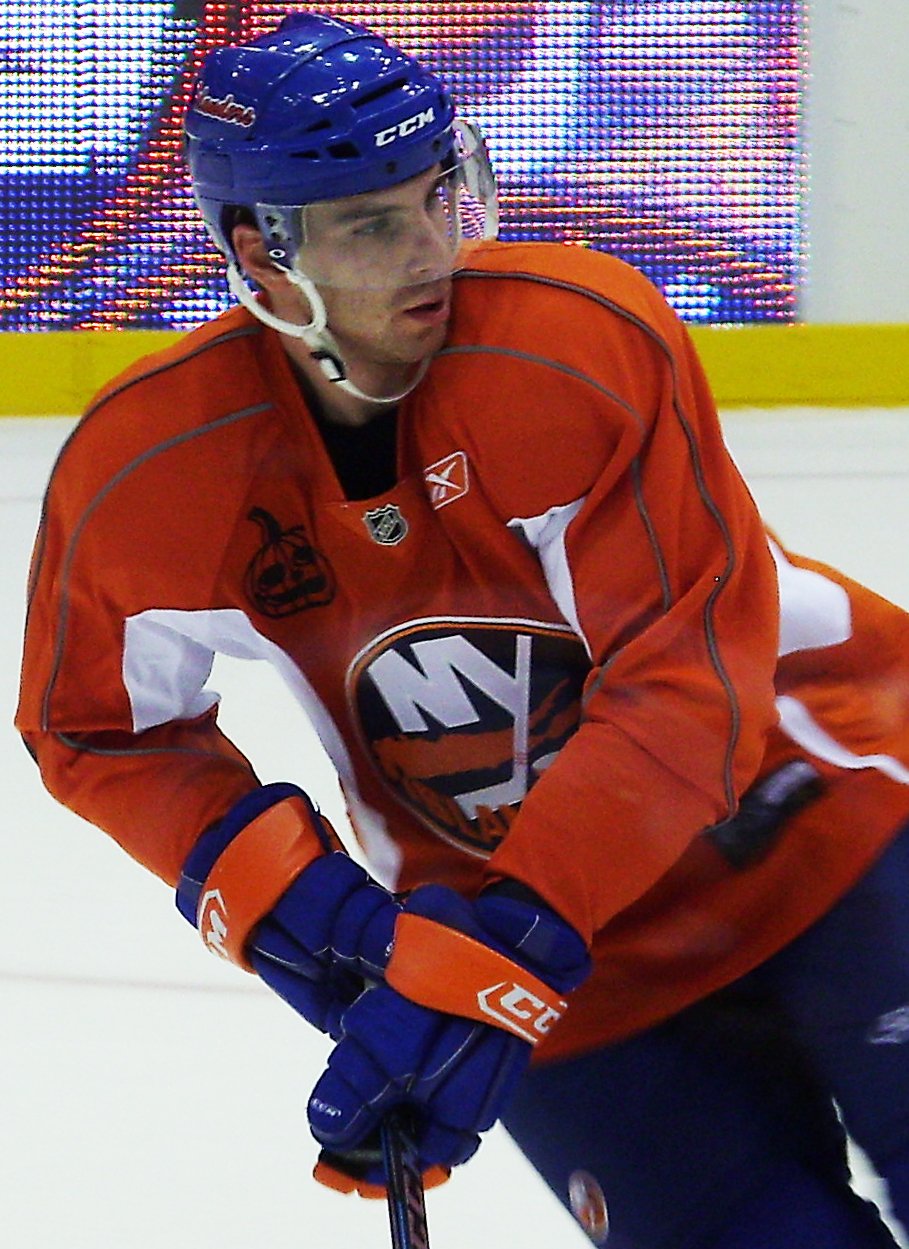
John Tavares won gold medals in 2008 and 2009 and was named Most Valuable Player in 2009.

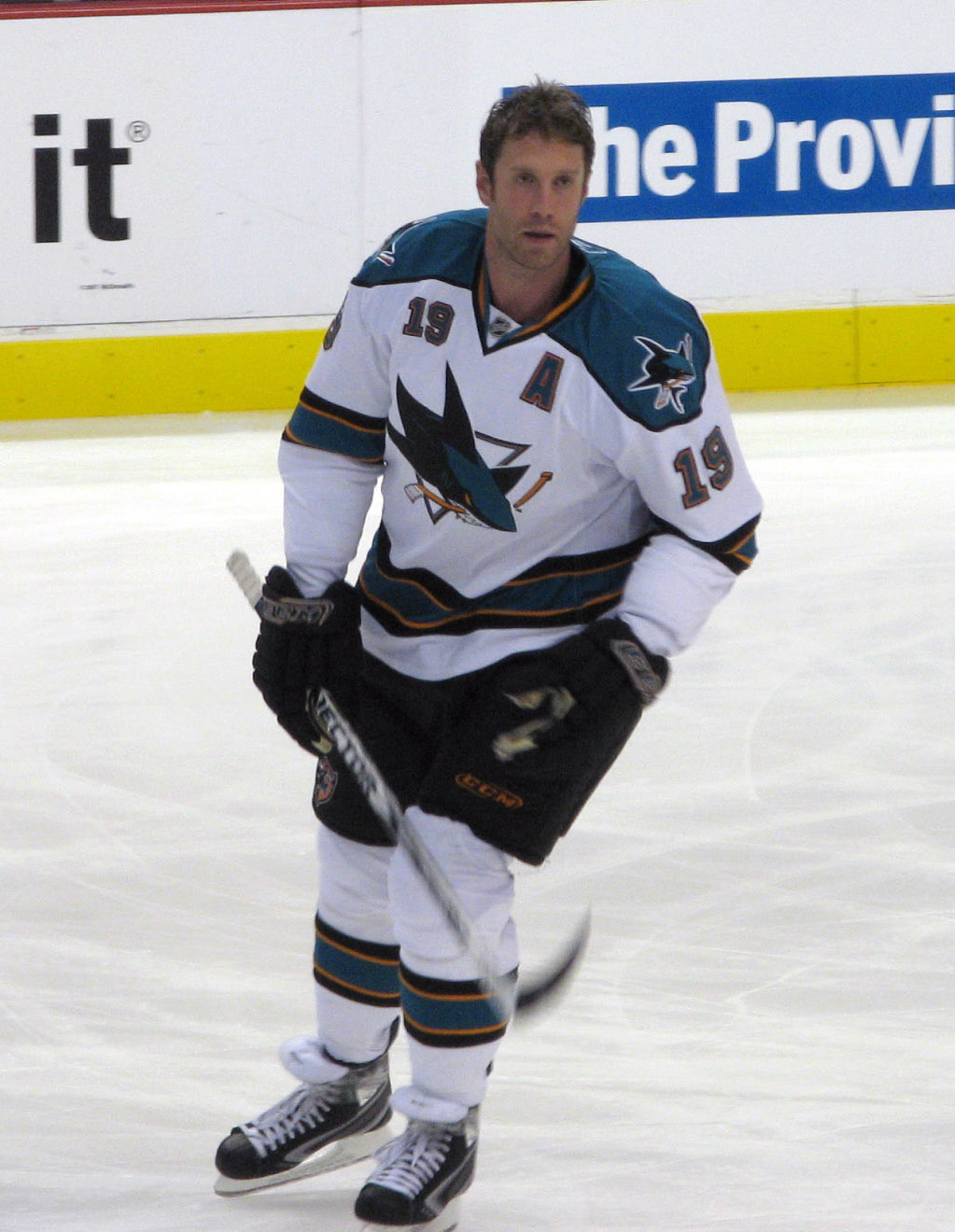
Joe Thornton won a gold medal in 1997.

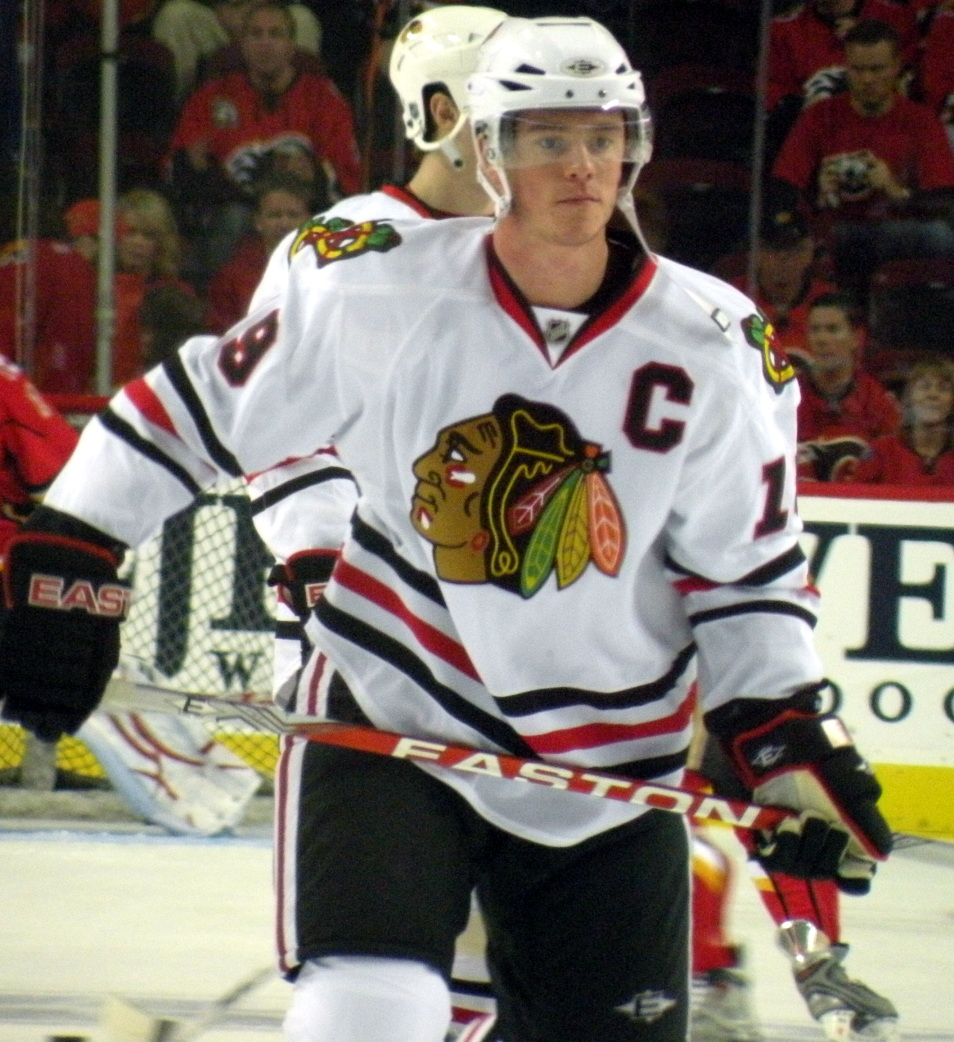
Jonathan Toews won gold medals in 2006 and 2007.

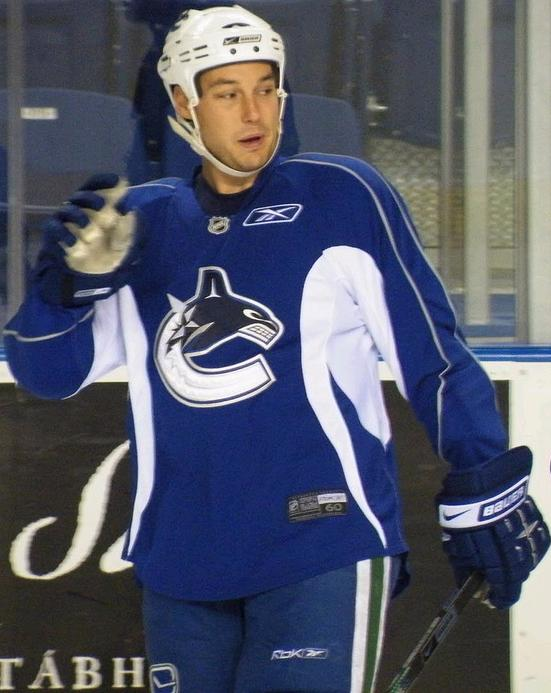
Kyle Wellwood won a silver medal in 2003.

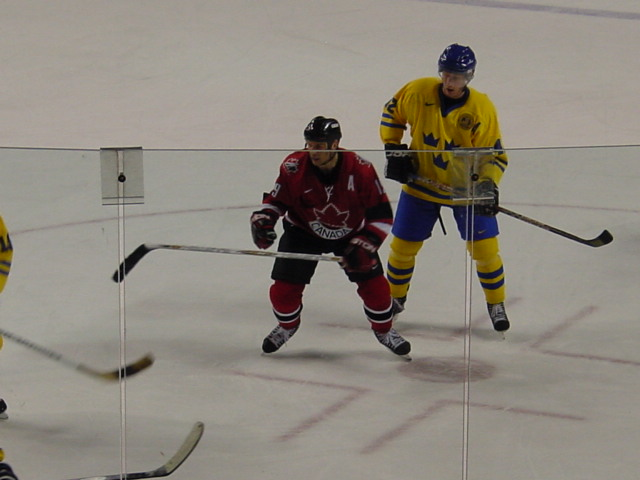
Steve Yzerman played in the 1983 tournament, winning a bronze medal.

Player	WCs	Tournament(s)	GP	G	A	P	PIM	Medals	Notes
Luke Adam	1	2010	6	4	4	8	8	Silver (2010)	
Bryan Allen	1	1999	7	1	2	3	2	Silver (1999)	
Chad Allan	2	1995, 1996	13	1	0	1	10	Gold (1995); Gold (1996)	
Jason Allison	2	1994, 1995	14	6	18	24	6	Gold (1994); Gold (1995)	
Ray Allison	1	1979	5	0	5	5	4		
Karl Alzner	2	2007, 2008	13	1	2	3	2	Gold (2007); Gold (2008)	Team Captain (2008)
John Anderson	1	1977	7	10	5	15	4	Silver (1977)	
Josh Anderson	1	2014	7	1	0	1	0		
Dave Andreychuk	1	1983	7	6	5	11	14	Bronze (1983)	
Chris Armstrong	1	1994	6	0	1	1	0	Gold (1994)	
Scott Arniel	2	1981, 1982	12	8	7	15	8	Gold (1982)	
Fred Arthur	1	1981	5	0	2	2	10		
Carter Ashton	1	2011	7	1	2	3	6	Silver (2011)	
Adrian Aucoin	1	1993	7	0	1	1	8	Gold (1993)	
Keith Aulie	1	2009	6	0	1	1	2	Gold (2009)	
Jared Aulin	1	2002	7	4	5	9	4	Silver (2002)	
Warren Babe	1	1988	7	0	2	2	10	Gold (1988)	
Wayne Babych	1	1978	6	5	5	10	4	Bronze (1978)	
Drew Bannister	1	1994	7	0	4	4	10	Gold (1994)	
Cam Barker	2	2005, 2006	9	3	4	7	22	Gold (2005); Gold (2006)	
Stu Barnes	1	1990	7	2	4	6	6	Gold (1990)	
Tyson Barrie	1	2011	7	1	2	3	0	Silver (2011)	
Bob Bassen	1	1985	7	2	0	2	8	Gold (1985)	
Nolan Baumgartner	2	1995, 1996	13	1	2	3	26	Gold (1995); Gold (1996)	Team Captain (1996)
Yves Beaudoin	1	1985	7	0	3	3	4	Gold (1985)	
Nathan Beaulieu	1	2012	6	0	1	1	16	Bronze (2012)	
Dave Beckon	1	1980	5	2	2	4	2		
Steve Bégin	1	1998	7	0	0	0	10		
Brendan Bell	1	2003	6	1	1	2	6	Silver (2003)	
Mark Bell	1	2000	7	2	0	2	8	Bronze (2000)	
Shawn Belle	2	2004, 2005	12	0	2	2	6	Silver (2004); Gold (2005)	
Jamie Benn	1	2009	6	4	2	6	4	Gold (2009)	
Patrice Bergeron	1	2005	6	5	8	13	5	Gold (2005)	Most Valuable Player (2005)
Brad Berry	1	1985	7	0	1	1	2	Gold (1985)	
Dan Bertram	2	2006, 2007	12	0	0	0	26	Gold (2006); Gold (2007)	
Jeff Bes	1	1993	7	3	2	5	4	Gold (1993)	
Blair Betts	1	1999	5	0	0	0	2	Silver (1999)	
Jeff Beukeboom	1	1985	3	1	0	1	4	Gold (1985)	
Chris Bigras	1	2014	7	0	0	0	0		
Mathieu Biron	1	2000	7	0	0	0	8	Bronze (2000)	
Sean Blanchard	1	1998	7	0	2	2	8		
Michael Blunden	1	2006	6	2	3	5	8	Gold (2006)	
Fred Boimistruck	1	1981	5	3	0	3	8		
Dave Bolland	1	2006	6	3	2	5	14	Gold (2006)	
Brad Bombardir	1	1992	7	0	3	3	4		
Jason Botterill	3	1994, 1995, 1996	19	2	7	9	16	Gold (1994); Gold (1995); Gold (1996)	
Joël Bouchard	2	1993, 1994	14	0	1	1	10	Gold (1994); Gold (1994)	
Pierre-Marc Bouchard	1	2003	6	2	3	5	2	Silver (2003)	
Tyler Bouck	2	1999, 2000	14	2	2	4	22	Silver (1999); Bronze (2000)	
Luc Bourdon	2	2006, 2007	12	3	7	10	10	Gold (2006); Gold (2007)	
Gabriel Bourque	1	2010	6	3	6	9	4	Silver (2010)	
Michaël Bournival	1	2012	6	0	1	1	0	Bronze (2012)	
Paul Boutilier	2	1982, 1983	14	4	8	12	6	Gold (1982); Bronze (1983)	
Jay Bouwmeester	3	2000, 2001, 2002	21	0	4	4	10	Bronze (2000); Bronze (2001); Silver (2002)	
Terry Bovair	1	1980	5	2	2	4	10		
Curtis Bowen	1	1994	7	2	0	2	10	Gold (1994)	
Madison Bowey	1	2015	7	1	3	4	2	Gold (2015)	
Zach Boychuk	2	2008, 2009	13	4	3	7	2	Gold (2008); Gold (2009)	
Dustin Boyd	1	2006	6	4	2	6	0	Gold (2006)	
Brad Boyes	2	2001, 2002	14	6	7	13	18	Bronze (2001); Silver (2002)	
Brian Bradley	1	1985	7	7	5	12	2	Gold (1985)	
Matt Bradley	1	1998	7	1	1	2	2		
Tim Brent	1	2004	6	1	2	3	4	Silver (2004)	
Eric Brewer	1	1998	7	0	2	2	8		
Daniel Brière	1	1997	7	2	4	6	4	Gold (1997)	
Rod Brind'Amour	1	1989	7	2	3	5	4		
Patrice Brisebois	2	1990, 1991	14	3	8	11	8	Gold (1990); Gold (1991)	
Curtis Brown	1	1996	5	0	1	1	2	Gold (1996)	
Keith Brown	1	1979	5	0	2	2	0		
Rob Brown	1	1988	7	6	2	8	2	Gold (1988)	
Brent Burns	1	2004	6	0	6	6	20	Silver (2004)	
Garth Butcher	1	1982	7	1	3	4	0	Gold (1982)	
Lyndon Byers	1	1984	6	1	1	2	4		
Eric Calder	1	1981	5	1	0	1	4		
Kyle Calder	1	1999	7	2	6	8	2	Silver (1999)	
Mike Cammalleri	2	2001, 2002	14	11	6	17	12	Bronze (2001); Silver (2002)	Best Forward (2002)
Anthony Camara	1	2013	6	0	2	2	31		
Bill Campbell	1	1981	5	0	1	1	2		
Brian Campbell	1	1999	7	1	1	2	4	Silver (1999)	
Gregory Campbell	1	2003	6	1	1	2	4	Silver (2003)	
Terry Carkner	1	1986	7	0	4	4	0	Silver (1986)	
Jordan Caron	1	2010	6	0	4	4	6	Silver (2010)	
Anson Carter	1	1994	7	3	2	5	0	Gold (1994)	
Jeff Carter	2	2004, 2005	12	12	5	17	8	Silver (2004); Gold (2005)	
Andrew Cassels	1	1989	7	2	5	7	2		
Bruce Cassidy	1	1984	7	0	0	0	6		
André Chartrain	1	1981	5	2	1	3	2		
Steve Chiasson	1	1987^{[Note 1]}	6	2	1	3	16		Team Captain (1987)
Jason Chimera	1	1999	7	2	2	4	2	Silver (1999)	
Kyle Chipchura	1	2006	6	4	1	5	0	Gold (2006)	Team Captain (2006)
Eric Chouinard	1	2000	7	3	0	3	0	Bronze (2000)	
Dave Chyzowski	1	1990	7	9	4	13	2	Gold (1990)	Team Captain (1990)
Dino Ciccarelli	1	1980	5	5	1	6	2		
Robert Cimetta	1	1989	7	7	4	11	4		
Carmen Cirella	1	1980	5	2	3	5	14		
Joe Cirella	1	1983	7	0	0	0	6	Bronze (1983)	
Casey Cizikas	1	2011	7	2	1	3	6	Silver (2011)	
Wendel Clark	1	1985	7	4	2	6	10	Gold (1985)	
Marc-André Cliche	1	2007	6	0	0	0	4	Gold (2007)	
Braydon Coburn	2	2004, 2005	12	2	3	5	10	Silver (2004); Gold (2005)	
Andrew Cogliano	2	2006, 2007	12	2	6	8	4	Gold (2006); Gold (2007)	
Carlo Colaiacovo	2	2002, 2003	13	1	12	13	4	Silver (2002); Silver (2003)	
Jeremy Colliton	2	2004, 2005	7	0	0	0	2	Silver (2004); Gold (2005)	
Blake Comeau	1	2006	6	3	4	7	8	Gold (2006)	
Patrice Cormier	2	2009, 2010	12	3	5	8	10	Gold (2009); Silver (2010)	Team Captain (2010)
Brett Connolly	2	2011, 2012	13	5	4	9	4	Silver (2011); Bronze (2012)	
Al Conroy	1	1986	7	4	4	8	6	Silver (1986)	
Joe Contini	1	1977	7	4	6	10	38	Silver (1977)	
Brandon Convery	1	1994	7	1	0	1	2	Gold (1994)	
Matt Cooke	1	1998	6	1	1	2	6		
Yvon Corriveau	1	1987^{[Note 1]}	6	2	1	3	4		
Daniel Corso	1	1998	7	0	3	3	4		
Shayne Corson	2	1985, 1986	14	10	10	20	8	Gold (1985); Silver (1986)	
Alain Côté	1	1986	7	1	4	5	6	Silver (1986)	
Sylvain Côté	2	1984, 1986	14	1	6	7	17	Silver (1986)	
Yves Courteau	1	1984	7	0	1	1	0		
Russ Courtnall	1	1984	7	7	6	13	0		Team Captain (1984)
Larry Courville	1	1995	7	2	3	5	6	Gold (1995)	
Sean Couturier	1	2011	7	2	1	3	0	Silver (2011)	
Jared Cowen	2	2010, 2011	13	1	1	2	2	Silver (2010); Silver (20111)	
Mike Craig	2	1990, 1991	14	9	5	14	16	Gold (1990); Gold (1991)	
Dale Craigwell	1	1991	6	1	2	3	0	Gold (1991)	
Marc Crawford	1	1981	5	1	2	3	4		Team Captain (1981)
Adam Creighton	1	1985	7	8	4	12	4	Gold (1985)	
Sidney Crosby	2	2004, 2005	12	8	6	14	8	Silver (2004); Gold (2005)	
Doug Crossman	1	1980	5	0	2	2	2		
Lawson Crouse	1	2015	7	1	2	3	0	Gold (2015)	
Jassen Cullimore	1	1992	7	1	0	1	2		
Dan Currie	1	1988	7	4	3	7	2	Gold (1988)	
Denis Cyr	1	1981	5	2	1	3	0		
Paul Cyr	2	1982, 1983	14	5	9	14	31	Gold (1982); Bronze (1983)	
Alexandre Daigle	2	1993, 1995	14	2	14	16	31	Gold (1993); Gold (1995)	
Jean-Jacques Daigneault	1	1984	7	0	2	2	2		
Pat Daley	1	1978	6	3	2	5	2	Bronze (1978)	
Phillip Danault	1	2013	6	0	1	1	2		
Kimbi Daniels	1	1992	7	3	4	7	16		
Jason Dawe	1	1993	7	3	3	6	8	Gold (1993)	
Nigel Dawes	2	2004, 2005	12	8	9	17	8	Silver (2004); Gold (2005)	
Éric Dazé	1	1995	7	8	2	10	0	Gold (1995)	
Calvin de Haan	2	2010, 2011	10	0	6	6	4	Silver (2010); Silver (2011)	
Stefan Della Rovere	2	2009, 2010	12	4	4	8	34	Gold (2009); Silver (2010)	
Gilbert Delorme	1	1981	5	1	0	1	0		
Dale Derkatch	2	1983, 1984	14	8	4	15	6	Bronze (1983)	
Éric Desjardins	2	1988, 1989	14	1	4	5	12	Gold (1988)	Team Captain (1989)
Simon Després	1	2011	7	0	3	3	0	Silver (2011)	
Boyd Devereaux	1	1997	7	4	0	4	0	Gold (1997)	
Chris DiDomenico	1	2009	6	2	5	7	4	Gold (2009)	
Gerald Diduck	1	1984	7	0	0	0	4		
Rob DiMaio	1	1988	7	1	0	1	10	Gold (1988)	
Stephen Dixon	2	2004, 2005	12	0	2	2	2	Silver (2004); Gold (2005)	
Jason Doig	1	1997	7	0	2	2	37	Gold (1997)	
Bobby Dollas	1	1985	7	0	2	2	12	Gold (1985)	
Hnat Domenichelli	1	1996	6	2	3	5	6	Gold (1996)	
Max Domi	1	2015	7	5	5	10	4	Gold (2015)	Best Forward (2015)
Shean Donovan	1	1995	7	0	0	0	6	Gold (1995)	
Drew Doughty	1	2008	7	0	4	4	0	Gold (2008)	Best Defenceman (2008)
Peter Douris	1	1986	7	4	2	6	6	Silver (1986)	
Steve Downie	2	2006, 2007	12	5	7	12	32	Gold (2006); Gold (2007)	
Kris Draper	2	1990, 1991	14	1	5	6	4	Gold (1990); Gold (1991)	
Jonathan Drouin	2	2013, 2014	13	5	8	13	24		
Harold Druken	1	1999	7	1	1	2	2	Silver (1999)	
Anthony Duclair	1	2015	7	4	4	8	16	Gold (2015)	
Christian Dubé	2	1996, 1997	13	8	5	13	0	Gold (1996); Gold (1997)	
Yanick Dubé	1	1994	7	5	5	10	10	Gold (1994)	
Ron Duguay	1	1977	7	2	4	6	16	Silver (1977)	
Matt Dumba	1	2014	7	0	1	1	12		
Jean-Pierre Dumont	1	1998	7	0	0	0	0		
Karl Dykhuis	2	1991, 1992	14	0	3	3	10	Gold (1991)	
Mike Eagles	1	1983	7	2	4	6	2	Bronze (1983)	
Bruce Eakin	1	1982	7	4	7	11	4	Gold (1982)	
Cody Eakin	1	2011	7	1	2	3	2	Silver (2011)	
Jeff Eatough	1	1981	5	1	2	3	16		
Jordan Eberle	2	2009, 2010	12	14	12	26	6	Gold (2009); Silver (2010)	Most Valuable Player (2010); Best Forward (2010)
Aaron Ekblad	1	2014	7	1	1	2	2		
Ryan Ellis	3	2009, 2010, 2011	19	5	20	25	4	Gold (2009); Silver (2010); Silver (2011)	Team Captain (2011); Best Defenceman (2011)
Pat Elynuik	1	1987^{[Note 1]}	6	6	5	11	2		
Steve Eminger	1	2003	6	0	2	2	16	Silver (2003)	
Tyler Ennis	1	2009	6	3	4	7	0	Gold (2009)	
Angelo Esposito	1	2009	6	3	1	4	4	Gold (2009)	
Dean Evason	1	1984	7	6	3	9	0		
Robby Fabbri	1	2015	5	2	4	6	0	Gold (2015)	
Pat Falloon	1	1991	7	3	3	6	2	Gold (1991)	
Rico Fata	1	1999	7	1	3	4	8	Silver (1999)	
David Fenyves	1	1980	5	0	0	0	8		Team Co-Captain (1980)
Andrew Ference	1	1999	7	1	2	3	6	Silver (1999)	
Brad Ference	2	1998, 1999	14	0	3	3	35	Silver (1999)	
Boris Fistric	1	1979	5	0	0	0	22		
Patrick Flatley	1	1983	7	4	0	4	6	Bronze (1983)	
Theoren Fleury	2	1987,^{[Note 1]} 1988	13	8	5	13	6	Gold (1988)	Team Captain (1988)
Marcus Foligno	1	2011	7	2	2	4	2	Silver (2011)	
Mike Forbes	1	1977	7	0	1	1	22	Silver (1977)	
Corey Foster	1	1989	7	1	3	4	4		
Dwight Foster	1	1977	7	2	4	6	8	Silver (1977)	
Guy Fournier	1	1981	5	1	2	3	0		
Jim Fox	1	1980	5	3	2	5	0		
Cody Franson	1	2007	6	0	2	2	4	Gold (2007)	
Colin Fraser	1	2005	6	1	4	5	2	Gold (2005)	
Curt Fraser	1	1978	5	0	2	2	0	Bronze (1978)	
Jeff Friesen	2	1994, 1995	12	5	4	9	4	Gold (1994); Gold (1995)	
Simon Gagné	1	1999	7	7	1	8	2	Silver (1999)	
Dave Gagner	1	1984	7	4	2	6	4		
Sam Gagner	1	2007	6	0	0	0	8	Gold (2007)	
Brendan Gallagher	1	2012	6	3	3	6	12	Bronze (2012)	
Bill Gardner	1	1980	5	0	4	4	14		
Mike Gartner	1	1978	6	3	3	6	4	Bronze (1978)	HHOF (2001)
Jean-Marc Gaulin	1	1981	5	2	0	2	4		
Denis Gauthier	1	1996	6	1	1	2	6	Gold (1996)	
Frédérik Gauthier	2	2014, 2015	14	0	2	2	2	Gold (2015)	
Aaron Gavey	1	1994	7	4	2	6	26	Gold (1994)	
Martin Gélinas	1	1989	7	0	2	2	8		
Martin Gendron	2	1993, 1994	14	11	6	17	8	Gold (1993); Gold (1994)	
Ryan Getzlaf	2	2004, 2005	12	6	12	18	12	Silver (2004); Gold (2005)	
Colton Gillies	1	2008	7	1	0	1	6	Gold (2008)	
Doug Gilmour	1	1981	5	0	0	0	0		HHOF (2011)
Rick Girard	1	1994	7	6	3	9	2	Gold (1994)	
Claude Giroux	1	2008	7	2	4	6	8	Gold (2008)	
Josh Godfrey	1	2008	7	0	5	5	8	Gold (2008)	
Cody Goloubef	1	2009	6	0	1	1	8	Gold (2009)	
Boyd Gordon	1	2003	6	0	0	0	0	Silver (2003)	
Robb Gordon	1	1996	6	0	4	4	0	Gold (1996)	
Josh Gorges	1	2004	6	0	3	3	4	Silver (2004)	
Brandon Gormley	1	2012	6	3	3	6	2	Bronze (2012)	Best Defenceman (2012)
Chris Gratton	1	1993	7	2	2	4	2	Gold (1993)	
Dan Gratton	1	1985	7	2	3	5	16	Gold (1985)	
Adam Graves	1	1988	7	5	0	5	4	Gold (1988)	
Jeff Greenlaw	1	1986	7	3	1	4	4	Silver (1986)	
Wayne Gretzky	1	1978	6	8	9	17	2	Bronze (1978)	Best Forward (1978); HHOF (1999); IIHFHOF (2000); CSHOF (2000)
Erik Gudbranson	1	2011	7	3	2	5	4	Silver (2011)	
Marc Habscheid	1	1982	7	6	6	12	2	Gold (1982)	
Matthew Halischuk	1	2008	7	2	3	5	2	Gold (2008)	
Taylor Hall	1	2010	6	6	6	12	0	Silver (2010)	
Kevin Haller	1	1990	7	2	2	4	8	Gold (1990)	
Craig Halliday	1	1981	5	0	0	0	2		
Dan Hamhuis	2	2001, 2002	13	0	4	4	16	Bronze (2001); Silver (2002)	
Curtis Hamilton	1	2011	7	4	0	4	2	Silver (2011)	
Dougie Hamilton	2	2012, 2013	12	3	5	8	6	Bronze (2012)	
Freddie Hamilton	1	2012	6	1	6	7	2	Bronze (2012)	
Hugh Hamilton	1	1997	7	0	0	0	6	Gold (1997)	
Travis Hamonic	1	2010	6	1	2	3	0	Silver (2010)	
David Harlock	1	1991	7	0	2	2	2	Gold (1991)	
Scott Harrington	2	2012, 2013	11	1	5	6	2	Bronze (2012)	
Jay Harrison	2	2001, 2002	14	0	1	1	8	Bronze (2001); Silver (2002)	
Craig Hartsburg	1	1978	6	1	4	5	8	Bronze (1978)	
Todd Harvey	2	1994, 1995	14	10	3	13	10	Gold (1994); Gold (1995)	Team Captain (1995)
Dale Hawerchuk	1	1981	5	5	5	10	2		HHOF (2001)
Greg Hawgood	2	1987,^{[Note 1]} 1988	13	3	10	13	12	Gold (1988)	
Dwayne Hay	1	1997	7	0	0	0	2	Gold (1997)	
Steve Hazlett	1	1977	7	6	1	7	4	Silver (1977)	
Randy Heath	1	1984	7	3	6	9	12		
Dillon Heatherington	1	2015	7	0	0	0	2	Gold (2015)	
Dany Heatley	2	2000, 2001	14	5	4	9	14	Bronze (2000); Bronze (2001)	
Darren Helm	1	2007	6	2	0	2	10	Gold (2007)	
Adam Henrique	1	2010	6	1	0	1	2	Silver (2010)	
Jason Herter	1	1990	7	0	1	1	2	Gold (1990)	
Joe Hicketts	1	2015	7	0	3	3	2	Gold (2015)	
Thomas Hickey	2	2008, 2009	13	0	4	4	6	Gold (2008); Gold (2009)	Team Captain (2009)
Andre Hidi	1	1980	5	2	0	2	2		
Bill Hobbins	1	1979	5	0	1	1	4		
Cody Hodgson	1	2009	6	5	11	16	2	Gold (2009)	
Dan Hodgson	2	1984, 1985	14	6	6	12	4	Gold (1985)	Team Captain (1985)
Josh Holden	1	1998	7	4	0	4	14		
Jason Holland	1	1996	6	2	1	3	4	Gold (1996)	
Riley Holzapfel	1	2008	7	0	0	0	8	Gold (2008)	
Bo Horvat	1	2014	7	1	2	3	6		
Dennis Houle	1	1977	7	0	1	1	0	Silver (1977)	
Quinton Howden	2	2011, 2012	13	5	6	11	6	Silver (2011); Bronze (2012)	
Bruce Howes	1	1979	5	0	1	1	4		
Willie Huber	2	1977, 1978	13	1	4	5	13	Silver (1977); Bronze (1978)	
Jonathan Huberdeau	2	2012, 2013	12	4	14	18	20	Bronze (2012)	
Charles Hudon	1	2014	7	1	1	2	2		
Kerry Huffman	1	1987^{[Note 1]}	6	0	1	1	4		
Ryan Hughes	1	1992	7	0	1	1	0		
Jody Hull	1	1988	7	2	1	3	2	Gold (1988)	
Dave Hunter	1	1977	7	6	0	6	4	Silver (1977)	
Jarome Iginla	1	1996	6	5	7	12	4	Gold (1996)	Best Forward (1996)
Ralph Intranuovo	1	1993	7	3	2	5	4	Gold (1993)	
Randy Irving	1	1979	5	4	2	6	8		
Brad Isbister	1	1997	7	4	3	7	8	Gold (1997)	
Barret Jackman	2	2000, 2001	14	0	4	4	18	Bronze (2000); Bronze (2001)	
Ric Jackman	1	1997	7	2	0	2	0	Gold (1997)	
Jeff Jackson	1	1985	7	1	7	8	10	Gold (1985)	
Jason Jaspers	1	2001	7	1	0	1	6	Bronze (2001)	
Boone Jenner	2	2012, 2013	8	0	2	2	31	Bronze (2012)	
Ryan Johansen	1	2011	7	3	6	9	2	Silver (2011)	
Trevor Johansen	1	1977	7	0	3	3	13	Silver (1977)	
Greg Johnson	1	1991	7	4	2	6	0	Gold (1991)	
Greg Johnston	1	1985	7	2	0	2	2	Gold (1985)	
Yvan Joly	2	1979, 1980	10	5	0	5	10		
Chris Joseph	2	1987,^{[Note 1]} 1988	13	2	3	5	22	Gold (1988)	
Ed Jovanovski	1	1995	7	2	0	2	4	Gold (1995)	
Steve Junker	1	1992	7	2	2	4	4		
Nazem Kadri	1	2010	6	3	5	8	14	Silver (2010)	
Evander Kane	1	2009	6	2	4	6	2	Gold (2009)	
Paul Kariya	2	1992, 1993	13	3	7	10	4	Gold (1993)	
Zack Kassian	1	2011	5	2	1	3	27	Silver (2011)	
Mike Keane	1	1987^{[Note 1]}	6	0	1	1	4		
Mike Keating	1	1977	7	0	2	2	0	Silver (1977)	
John Paul Kelly	1	1979	5	0	0	0	10		Team Captain (1979)
Sheldon Kennedy	2	1988, 1989	14	7	6	13	20	Gold (1988)	
Matt Kinch	1	2000	7	0	0	0	0	Bronze (2000)	
John Kirk	1	1981	5	4	3	7	14		
Terry Kirkham	1	1979	5	2	1	3	2		
Bill Kitchen	1	1980	5	0	1	1	10		
Kevin Klein	1	2004	6	0	0	0	0	Silver (2004)	
Gord Kluzak	1	1982	7	0	1	1	4	Gold (1982)	Best Defenceman (1982)
Chuck Kobasew	1	2002	7	5	1	6	2	Silver (2002)	
Zenith Komarniski	1	1998	7	0	0	0	26		
Brandon Kozun	1	2010	6	3	4	7	0	Silver (2010)	
Gary Lacey	1	1984	7	0	0	0	4		
Andrew Ladd	1	2005	6	3	4	7	2	Gold (2005)	
Nathan LaFayette	1	1993	7	3	1	4	0	Gold (1993)	
Stefan Legein	1	2008	7	1	1	2	8	Gold (2008)	
Brooks Laich	1	2003	6	2	4	6	0	Silver (2003)	
Dan Lambert	1	1989	7	1	2	3	4		
Daymond Langkow	1	1996	5	3	3	6	2	Gold (1996)	
Marc Laniel	1	1988	7	1	2	3	6	Gold (1988)	
Rick Lanz	1	1980	5	0	1	1	6		Team Co-Captain (1980)
Martin Lapointe	3	1991, 1992, 1993	20	9	8	17	18	Gold (1991); Gold (1993)	Team Captain (1993)
Brad Larsen	2	1996, 1997	13	1	2	3	10	Gold (1996); Gold (1997)	Team Captain (1997)
Guillaume Latendresse	1	2006	6	0	0	0	0	Gold (2006)	
David Latta	1	1987^{[Note 1]}	6	4	6	10	12		
Scott Laughton	1	2014	7	0	1	1	6		Team Captain (2014)
Derek Laxdal	1	1986	7	1	4	5	6	Silver (1986)	
Curtis Lazar	2	2014, 2015	14	8	8	16	0	Gold (2015)	Team Captain (2015)
Jamie Leach	1	1989	7	1	4	5	2		
Louis Leblanc	1	2011	7	3	4	7	2	Silver (2011)	
Vincent Lecavalier	1	1998	7	1	1	2	4		
Brad Leeb	1	1999	7	3	5	8	2	Silver (1999)	
Gary Leeman	2	1983, 1984	14	4	8	12	14	Bronze (1983)	
Taylor Leier	1	2014	7	0	0	0	6		
Moe Lemay	1	1982	7	2	0	2	4	Gold (1982)	
Claude Lemieux	1	1985	6	3	2	5	6	Gold (1985)	
Mario Lemieux	1	1983	7	5	5	10	10	Bronze (1983)	HHOF (1997); CSHOF (1998); IIHFHOF (2008)
Kris Letang	2	2006, 2007	12	1	8	9	14	Gold (2006); Gold (2007)	Team Captain (2007)
Trevor Letowski	1	1997	7	2	1	3	4	Gold (1997)	
Trevor Linden	1	1988	7	1	0	1	0	Gold (1988)	
Eric Lindros	3	1990, 1991, 1992	21	12	19	31	32	Gold (1990); Gold (1991)	Team Captain (1992); Best Forward (1991)
J. C. Lipon	1	2013	5	0	0	0	27		
Bryan Little	1	2007	6	1	1	2	14	Gold (2007)	
Darcy Loewen	1	1989	7	1	1	2	12		
Jamie Lundmark	2	2000, 2001	14	6	6	12	6	Bronze (2000); Bronze (2001)	
Gary Lupul	1	1979	5	1	1	2	2		
Joffrey Lupul	1	2003	6	2	1	3	27	Silver (2003)	
Clarke MacArthur	1	2005	6	4	0	4	10	Gold (2005)	
John MacLean	1	1984	7	7	1	8	4		
Brad Marchand	2	2007, 2008	13	6	2	8	6	Gold (2007); Gold (2008)	
Kenndal McArdle	1	2007	6	0	0	0	0	Gold (2007)	
Derek MacKenzie	1	2001	7	1	2	3	4	Bronze (2001)	
Nathan MacKinnon	1	2013	6	0	1	1	4		
Scott MacLeod	1	1979	5	1	2	3	4		
Brandon McMillan	1	2010	6	4	4	8	0	Silver (2010)	
Mark McNeill	1	2013	6	0	0	0	2		
Adam Mair	1	1999	7	1	1	2	29	Silver (1999)	
Stewart Malgunas	1	1990	7	0	1	1	0	Gold (1990)	
Manny Malhotra	2	1998, 2000	14	0	2	2	8	Bronze (2000)	Team Captain (2000)
Kent Manderville	2	1990, 1991	14	2	8	10	0	Gold (1990); Gold (1991)	
Cameron Mann	1	1997	7	3	4	7	10	Gold (1997)	
Anthony Mantha	1	2014	7	5	6	11	0		
Brad Marsh	2	1977, 1978	13	1	7	8	20	Silver (1977); Bronze (1978)	
Jason Marshall	1	1991	7	0	4	4	6	Gold (1991)	
Shawn Matthias	1	2008	7	3	1	4	4	Gold (2008)	
Richard Matvichuk	1	1992	4	0	0	0	2		
Brad May	1	1991	3	1	0	1	2	Gold (1991)	
Dean McAmmond	1	1993	7	0	1	1	12	Gold (1993)	
Wayne McBean	1	1988	7	1	0	1	2	Gold (1988)	
Bryan McCabe	2	1994, 1995	14	3	9	12	10	Gold (1994); Gold (1995)	Best Defenceman (1995)
Steve McCarthy	2	2000, 2001	14	1	3	4	6	Bronze (2000); Bronze (2001)	Team Captain (2001)
Alyn McCauley	2	1996, 1997	13	2	8	10	4	Gold (1996); Gold (1997)	
Jay McClement	2	2002, 2003	13	2	3	5	6	Silver (2002); Silver (2003)	
Dale McCourt	1	1977	7	10	8	18	14	Silver (1977)	Team Captain (1977); Best Forward (1977)
Scott McCrady	1	1988	7	0	1	1	8	Gold (1988)	
Brad McCrimmon	2	1978, 1979	11	1	4	5	6	Bronze (1978)	
Connor McDavid	2	2014, 2015	14	4	11	15	4	Gold (2015)	
Kent McDonell	1	1999	7	1	1	2	4	Silver (1999)	
John McIntyre	1	1989	7	1	0	1	4		
Tony McKegney	1	1978	6	2	6	8	0	Bronze (1978)	
Brett McLean	1	1998	7	1	1	2	4		
Dave McLlwain	1	1987^{[Note 1]}	6	4	4	8	2		
Derek Meech	1	2004	6	0	1	1	2	Silver (2004)	
Scott Mellanby	1	1986	7	5	4	9	6	Silver (1986)	
Larry Melnyk	1	1979	5	1	1	2	2		
Scott Metcalfe	1	1987^{[Note 1]}	6	2	5	7	12		
Craig Mills	1	1996	6	0	0	0	4	Gold (1996)	
John Miner	1	1985	7	0	2	2	12	Gold (1985)	
Mike Moller	1	1982	7	5	9	14	4	Gold (1982)	
Randy Moller	1	1982	7	0	3	3	4	Gold (1982)	
Samuel Morin	1	2015	7	0	0	0	6	Gold (2015)	
David Morisset	1	2001	7	0	1	1	18	Bronze (2001)	
Josh Morrissey	2	2014, 2015	14	2	5	7	4	Gold (2015)	
Dave Morrison	1	1982	7	1	2	3	0	Gold (1982)	
Mark Morrison	2	1982, 1983	14	6	9	15	0	Gold (1982); Bronze (1983)	
Brenden Morrow	1	1999	7	1	7	8	4	Silver (1999)	
Dave Moylan	1	1986	7	1	2	3	0	Silver (1986)	
Kirk Muller	1	1984	7	2	1	3	16		
Joe Murphy	1	1986	7	4	10	14	2	Silver (1986)	
Larry Murphy	1	1980	5	1	0	1	4		HHOF (2004)
Rob Murphy	1	1989	7	1	0	1	8		
Ryan Murphy	1	2013	6	1	2	3	2		
Garth Murray	1	2002	7	3	3	6	12	Silver (2002)	
Marty Murray	2	1994, 1995	14	7	12	19	4	Gold (1994); Gold (1995)	Best Forward (1995)
Ryan Murray	1	2012	6	0	3	3	0	Bronze (2012)	
Troy Murray	1	1982	7	4	4	8	6	Gold (1982)	Team Captain (1982)
Tyler Myers	1	2009	6	1	0	1	2	Gold (2009)	
Rick Nash	1	2002	7	1	2	3	2	Silver (2002)	
James Neal	1	2007	6	0	0	0	8	Gold (2007)	
Mike Needham	1	1990	7	3	4	7	2	Gold (1990)	
Chris Nielsen	1	2000	7	3	0	3	8	Bronze (2000)	
Jeff Nelson	1	1992	7	1	1	2	2		
Steve Nemeth	1	1987^{[Note 1]}	6	4	4	8	4		
Greg Nemisz	1	2010	6	1	0	1	0	Silver (2010)	
Rob Niedermayer	1	1993	7	0	2	2	4	Gold (1993)	
Scott Niedermayer	2	1991, 1992	10	0	0	0	10	Gold (1991)	CSHOF (2012); HHOF (2013)
Joe Nieuwendyk	1	1986	7	5	7	12	6	Silver (1986)	HHOF (2011)
Dwayne Norris	1	1990	7	2	4	6	2	Gold (1990)	
Ryan Nugent-Hopkins	1	2013	6	4	11	15	4		Team Captain (2013); Best Forward (2013)
Darnell Nurse	1	2015	7	0	1	1	6	Gold (2015)	
Gary Nylund	1	1982	7	1	3	4	0	Gold (1982)	
Ryan O'Marra	2	2006, 2007	12	0	4	4	26	Gold (2006); Gold (2007)	
Jeff O'Neill	1	1995	7	2	4	6	2	Gold (1995)	
Selmar Odelein	2	1985, 1986	14	1	6	7	14	Gold (1985); Silver (1986)	
John Ogrodnick	1	1979	5	3	1	4	4		
Jamie Oleksiak	1	2012	6	0	0	0	2	Bronze (2012)	
Dylan Olsen	1	2011	7	0	2	2	0	Silver (2011)	
Dave Orleski	1	1979	5	3	0	3	0		
Steve Ott	2	2001, 2002	14	5	4	9	14	Bronze (2001); Silver (2002)	
Xavier Ouellet	1	2013	6	1	2	3	2		
Nathan Paetsch	2	2002, 2003	13	1	1	2	4	Silver (2002); Silver (2003)	
Daniel Paille	2	2003, 2004	12	4	0	4	4	Silver (2003); Silver (2004)	Team Captain (2004)
Ryan Parent	2	2006, 2007	12	0	0	0	18	Gold (2006); Gold (2007)	
Pierre-Alexandre Parenteau	1	2003	6	4	3	7	2	Silver (2003)	
Mark Paterson	1	1983	7	0	2	2	10	Bronze (1983)	
Rick Paterson	1	1978	6	1	2	3	0	Bronze (1978)	
James Patrick	2	1982, 1983	14	0	4	4	10	Gold (1982); Bronze (1983)	Team Captain (1983)
Nick Paul	1	2015	7	3	0	3	2	Gold (2015)	
Tanner Pearson	1	2012	6	1	5	6	6	Bronze (2012)	
Michael Peca	1	1994	7	2	2	4	8	Gold (1994)	
Denis Pederson	1	1995	7	2	2	4	0	Gold (1995)	
Mark Pederson	1	1988	7	1	2	3	4	Gold (1988)	
Adam Pelech	1	2014	7	0	1	1	2		
Scott Pellerin	1	1990	7	2	0	2	2	Gold (1990)	
Chad Penney	1	1992	7	0	0	0	2		
Corey Perry	1	2005	6	2	5	7	6	Gold (2005)	
Nic Petan	2	2014, 2015	14	8	8	14	12	Gold (2015)	
Matt Pettinger	1	2000	7	4	0	4	4	Bronze (2000)	
Dion Phaneuf	2	2004, 2005	12	3	7	10	43	Silver (2004); Gold (2005)	Best Defenceman (2005)
Chris Phillips	2	1996, 1997	13	0	1	1	4	Gold (1996); Gold (1997)	
Alex Pietrangelo	2	2009, 2010	12	4	11	15	14	Gold (2009); Silver (2010)	Best Defenceman (2010)
Mark Plantery	1	1977	7	0	1	1	2	Silver (1977)	
Adrien Plavsic	1	1990	7	0	1	1	8	Gold (1990)	
Jason Podollan	1	1996	6	2	3	5	2	Gold (1996)	
Brayden Point	1	2015	7	2	2	4	4	Gold (2015)	
Sasha Pokulok	1	2006	6	0	0	0	0	Gold (2006)	
Mark Popovic	2	2001, 2002	14	0	3	3	8	Bronze (2001); Silver (2002)	
Patrick Poulin	1	1992	7	2	2	4	2		
Benoît Pouliot	1	2006	6	0	5	5	14	Gold (2006)	
Derrick Pouliot	1	2014	7	1	4	5	8		
Chris Pronger	1	1993	7	1	3	4	6	Gold (1993)	
Brian Propp	1	1979	5	2	1	3	2		
Tom Pyatt	2	2006, 2007	12	2	3	5	18	Gold (2006); Gold (2007)	
Logan Pyett	1	2008	7	0	1	1	4	Gold (2008)	
Mark Pysyk	1	2012	6	0	0	0	2	Bronze (2012)	
Yves Racine	1	1989	7	0	0	0	6		
Rob Ramage	2	1977, 1978	13	1	5	6	8	Silver (1977); Bronze (1978)	
Mike Rathje	1	1993	7	2	2	4	12	Gold (1993)	
Ty Rattie	1	2013	6	3	0	3	0		
Dan Ratushny	1	1990	7	2	2	4	4	Gold (1990)	
Errol Rausse	1	1979	5	1	1	2	2		
Kent Reardon	1	1979	5	2	1	3	6		
Mark Recchi	1	1988	7	0	5	5	4	Gold (1988)	
Wade Redden	2	1995, 1996	13	3	4	7	2	Gold (1995); Gold (1996)	
Mark Reeds	1	1980	5	1	0	1	2		
Robyn Regehr	1	1999	7	0	0	0	2	Silver (1999)	
Brandon Reid	2	2000, 2001	14	5	8	13	4	Bronze (2000); Bronze (2001)	
Griffin Reinhart	2	2013, 2014	9	1	2	3	10		
Sam Reinhart	2	2014, 2015	14	7	9	16	6	Gold (2015)	
Mike Ribeiro	1	2000	7	0	2	2	0	Bronze (2000)	
Mike Ricci	2	1989, 1990	12	5	6	11	6	Gold (1990)	
Steven Rice	2	1990, 1991	14	6	1	7	24	Gold (1990); Gold (1991)	Team Captain (1991)
Brad Richards	1	2000	7	1	1	2	0	Bronze (2000)	
Mike Richards	2	2004, 2005	12	3	7	10	4	Silver (2004); Gold (2005)	Team Captain (2005)
Luke Richardson	1	1987^{[Note 1]}	6	0	0	0	0		
Stéphane Richer	1	1985	7	4	3	7	2	Gold (1985)	
Morgan Rielly	1	2013	6	1	2	3	0		
Pierre Rioux	1	1982	7	3	3	6	4	Gold (1982)	
Brett Ritchie	1	2013	6	1	3	4	4		
Nick Ritchie	1	2015	7	1	0	1	6	Gold (2015)	
Jamie Rivers	1	1995	7	3	3	6	2	Gold (1995)	
Gary Roberts	1	1986	7	6	3	9	6	Silver (1986)	
Luc Robitaille	1	1986	7	3	5	8	2	Silver (1986)	
Kyle Rossiter	1	2000	7	0	0	0	20	Bronze (2000)	
Alexandre Rouleau	1	2003	6	0	1	1	0	Silver (2003)	
Derek Roy	1	2003	6	1	2	3	4	Silver (2003)	
Stephane Roy	1	1987^{[Note 1]}	6	0	1	1	6		
Joe Rullier	1	2000	7	0	0	0	6	Bronze (2000)	
Kris Russell	2	2006, 2007	12	5	5	10	4	Gold (2006); Gold (2007)	
Roy Russell	1	1981	5	0	0	0	0		
Kerby Rychel	1	2014	7	0	0	0	0		
Brad Ryder	1	1980	4	1	1	2	14		
Michael Ryder	1	2000	7	1	3	4	6	Bronze (2000)	
Joe Sakic	1	1988	7	3	1	4	2	Gold (1988)	HHOF (2012); CSHOF (2013)
Jim Sandlak	2	1985, 1986	12	6	7	13	22	Gold (1985); Silver (1986)	Team Captain (1986); Best Forward (1986)
Everett Sanipass	1	1987^{[Note 1]}	6	3	2	5	8		
Cory Sarich	2	1997, 1998	14	0	1	1	12	Gold (1997)	Team Co-Captain (1998)
Reggie Savage	1	1989	7	4	5	9	4		
Robert Savard	1	1981	5	0	2	2	2		
Marco Scandella	1	2010	6	1	2	3	2	Silver (2010)	
Peter Schaefer	1	1997	7	3	1	4	4	Gold (1997)	
Mark Scheifele	2	2012, 2013	12	8	6	14	2	Bronze (2012)	
Brayden Schenn	2	2010, 2011	13	10	16	26	4	Silver (2010); Silver (2011)	Most Valuable Player (2011); Best Forward (2011)
Luke Schenn	1	2008	7	0	0	0	6	Gold (2008)	
Andy Schneider	1	1992	7	0	0	0	6		
Nick Schultz	2	2001, 2002	14	0	2	2	6	Bronze (2001); Silver (2002)	
Jaden Schwartz	2	2011, 2012	8	3	5	8	4	Silver (2011); Bronze (2012)	Team Captain (2012)
Brent Seabrook	2	2004, 2005	11	1	5	6	2	Silver (2004); Gold (2005)	
Al Secord	1	1977	7	2	2	4	10	Silver (1977)	
Ric Seiling	1	1977	7	3	3	6	8	Silver (1977)	
Pierre Sévigny	1	1991	7	4	2	6	8	Gold (1991)	
Brendan Shanahan	1	1987^{[Note 1]}	6	4	3	7	4		HHOF (2013)
Darrin Shannon	1	1989	7	1	3	4	10		
Jeff Shantz	1	1993	7	2	4	6	2	Gold (1993)	
Brad Shaw	2	1983, 1984	14	1	3	4	2	Bronze (1983)	
Geoff Shaw	1	1977	7	3	1	4	19	Silver (1977)	
Gord Sherven	1	1983	7	1	3	4	0	Bronze (1983)	
Mike Sillinger	1	1991	7	4	2	6	2	Gold (1991)	
Wayne Simmonds	1	2008	7	0	0	0	4	Gold (2008)	
Sean Simpson	1	1980	5	0	2	2	0		
John Slaney	2	1991, 1992	14	2	5	7	12	Gold (1991)	
Bobby Smith	1	1978	3	1	4	5	0	Bronze (1978)	
Geoff Smith	1	1989	7	0	1	1	4		
Jason Smith	1	1993	7	1	3	4	10	Gold (1993)	
Stuart Smith	1	1980	5	1	0	1	10		
Devante Smith-Pelly	1	2012	1	0	0	0	0	Bronze (2012)	
Stan Smyl	1	1978	6	1	1	2	6	Bronze (1978)	
Ryan Smyth	1	1995	7	2	5	7	4	Gold (1995)	
Chris Snell	1	1991	7	0	4	4	0	Gold (1991)	
Brett Sonne	1	2009	6	1	2	3	0	Gold (2009)	
Lee Sorochan	1	1995	7	0	1	1	6	Gold (1995)	
Jason Spezza	3	2000, 2001, 2002	21	3	9	12	12	Bronze (2000); Bronze (2001); Silver (2002)	
David St. Pierre	1	1992	7	0	0	0	0		
Marc Staal	2	2006, 2007	12	0	1	1	8	Gold (2006); Gold (2007)	Best Defenceman (2006)
Matt Stajan	1	2003	6	1	1	2	0	Silver (2003)	
Nick Stajduhar	1	1994	7	1	4	5	8	Gold (1994)	
Steven Stamkos	1	2008	7	1	5	6	4	Gold (2008)	
Mike Stapleton	1	1986	7	3	3	6	6	Silver (1986)	
Turner Stevenson	1	1992	7	0	2	2	14		
Anthony Stewart	2	2004, 2005	12	8	7	15	2	Silver (2004); Gold (2005)	
Jarret Stoll	2	2001, 2002	14	2	6	8	10	Bronze (2001); Silver (2002)	Team Captain (2002)
Mark Stone	1	2012	6	7	3	10	2	Bronze (2012)	
Ryan Strome	2	2012, 2013	12	7	7	14	18	Bronze (2012)	
Todd Strueby	1	1982	7	0	5	5	4	Gold (1982)	
Brad Stuart	1	1999	7	0	1	1	2	Silver (1999)	
P. K. Subban	2	2008, 2009	13	3	6	9	8	Gold (2008); Gold (2009)	
Brian Sutherby	1	2002	7	3	3	6	2	Silver (2002)	
Brandon Sutter	1	2008	7	0	1	1	2	Gold (2008)	
Darryl Sydor	1	1992	7	3	1	4	4		
Danny Syvret	1	2005	6	1	2	3	2	Gold (2005)	
Maxime Talbot	1	2004	6	0	3	3	2	Silver (2004)	
Jeff Tambellini	1	2004	6	2	3	5	0	Silver (2004)	
Steve Tambellini	1	1978	6	2	2	4	0	Bronze (1978)	
Alex Tanguay	1	1998	7	2	1	3	2		
Tony Tanti	1	1983	7	0	4	4	6	Bronze (1983)	
John Tavares	2	2008, 2009	13	13	8	21	2	Gold (2008); Gold (2009)	Most Valuable Player (2009); Best Forward (2009)
Colten Teubert	2	2009, 2010	12	0	1	1	4	Gold (2009); Silver (2010)	
Shea Theodore	1	2015	7	1	1	2	0	Gold (2015)	
Joe Thornton	1	1997	7	2	2	4	0	Gold (1997)	
Scott Thornton	1	1991	7	3	1	4	0	Gold (1991)	
Daniel Tkaczuk	2	1998, 1999	14	8	5	13	14	Silver (1999)	
Jonathan Toews	2	2006, 2007	12	4	5	9	14	Gold (2006); Gold (2007)	
Jordin Tootoo	1	2003	6	1	1	2	4	Silver (2003)	
Raffi Torres	1	2001	7	3	2	5	10	Bronze (2001)	
Larry Trader	1	1983	7	2	3	5	8	Bronze (1983)	
Darcy Tucker	1	1995	7	0	4	4	0	Gold (1995)	
Brent Tully	2	1993, 1994	14	1	3	4	28	Gold (1993); Gold (1994)	Team Captain (1994)
Pierre Turgeon	1	1987^{[Note 1]}	6	3	0	3	2		
Sylvain Turgeon	1	1983	7	4	2	6	8	Bronze (1983)	
Kyle Turris	1	2008	7	4	4	8	2	Gold (2008)	
Scottie Upshall	2	2002, 2003	13	7	4	11	28	Silver (2002); Silver (2003)	Team Captain (2003)
Rick Vaive	1	1978	6	3	0	3	4	Bronze (1978)	
Mike Van Ryn	2	1998, 1999	14	0	1	1	8	Silver (1999)	Team Captain (1999)
Steve Veilleux	1	1989	6	0	0	0	0		
Pat Verbeek	1	1983	7	2	2	4	6	Bronze (1983)	
Jake Virtanen	1	2015	7	1	3	4	4	Gold (2015)	
Emanuel Viveiros	1	1986	7	1	1	2	2	Silver (1986)	
Jesse Wallin	2	1997, 1998	11	0	0	0	10	Gold (1997)	Team Co-Captain (1998)
Ryan Walter	1	1978	6	5	3	8	4	Bronze (1978)	Team Captain (1978)
Wes Walz	1	1990	7	2	3	5	0	Gold (1990)	
Jason Ward	2	1998, 1999	14	2	1	3	10	Silver (1999)	
Jeff Ware	1	1997	7	0	0	0	6	Gold (1997)	
Rhett Warrener	1	1996	6	0	0	0	4	Gold (1996)	
Mike Watt	1	1996	6	1	2	3	6	Gold (1996)	
Shea Weber	1	2005	6	0	0	0	10	Gold (2005)	
Stephen Weiss	1	2002	6	3	1	4	6	Silver (2002)	
Kyle Wellwood	1	2003	6	1	4	5	0	Silver (2003)	
Darcy Werenka	1	1993	7	1	0	1	18	Gold (1993)	
Glen Wesley	1	1987^{[Note 1]}	6	2	1	3	4		
Ian White	1	2003	6	2	4	6	0	Silver (2003)	
Trent Whitfield	1	1997	7	1	0	1	4	Gold (1997)	
Jim Wiemer	1	1980	5	2	2	4	2		
Shane Willis	1	1997	7	0	0	0	0	Gold (1997)	
Brian Willsie	1	1998	7	0	2	2	4		
Carey Wilson	1	1982	7	4	1	5	6	Gold (1982)	
Brendan Witt	1	1994	7	0	0	0	6	Gold (1994)	
Tyler Wotherspoon	1	2013	6	1	1	2	0		
Jeff Woywitka	1	2003	6	1	1	2	0	Silver (2003)	
Jamie Wright	1	1996	6	1	2	3	2	Gold (1996)	
Tyler Wright	2	1992, 1993	14	4	3	7	22	Gold (1993)	
Brian Young	1	1978	6	0	2	2	2	Bronze (1978)	
Steve Yzerman	1	1983	7	2	3	5	2	Bronze (1983)	CSHOF (2008); HHOF (2009); IIHFHOF (2014)
Mike Zigomanis	1	2001	7	2	2	4	0	Bronze (2001)	

== See also ==
- List of Olympic men's ice hockey players for Canada
- List of Men's World Ice Hockey Championship players for Canada (1977–present)
- List of Canadian national ice hockey team rosters
- List of IIHF World Under-20 Championship medalists

== Notes ==
Note 1—Canada's seventh game in the 1987 World Championships against the Soviet Union was not completed and declared null and void because of a bench-clearing brawl between the two teams. Canada had been winning 4–2, but the statistics of that game are not included here.
