= Punch-up in Piestany =

Bench-clearing hockey brawl in 1987

- Players from both teams fighting over the entire ice surface
	1	2	3	Total
Soviet Union	1	1	–	DQ (2)
Canada	3	1	–	DQ (4)
- Date: 4 January 1987
- Arena: Zimný Štadión Piešťany
- City: Piešťany, Czechoslovakia

The Punch-up in Piestany was a bench-clearing brawl between Canada and the Soviet Union during the final game of the 1987 World Junior Ice Hockey Championships in Piešťany, Czechoslovakia (now Slovakia) on January 4, 1987. The incident resulted in the ejection of both teams from the tournament, and while the Soviets had already been eliminated from medal contention, the disqualification cost Canada a medal – potentially the gold. The brawl is famous for officials turning off the arena lights in a desperate attempt to end the 20-minute melee. Much of the blame was placed on Norwegian referee Hans Rønning, who had been selected for the game based on his perceived neutrality rather than experience.

Following the brawl, the International Ice Hockey Federation (IIHF) suspended the players involved for 18 months and the coaches for three years. The players' suspensions were later reduced to six months on appeal, allowing several players from both teams to return for the 1988 tournament in Moscow. Both nations won medals in 1988, with Canada taking the gold and the Soviets winning silver.

The brawl dramatically raised the profile of the World Junior Hockey Championships in Canada, where it is now one of the top events on the annual sports calendar. The fervent nationalism displayed by Canadian Broadcasting Corporation (CBC) analyst Don Cherry in the aftermath of the incident led to a sharp rise in his own popularity with Canadian fans. Several players in the game went on to play in the National Hockey League (NHL), including Theoren Fleury, Mike Keane, Greg Hawgood, Everett Sanipass, Brendan Shanahan, Luke Richardson, Pierre Turgeon, and Glen Wesley for Canada and Sergei Fedorov, Vladimir Konstantinov, and Alexander Mogilny for the Soviets. Of these players, four (Fedorov, Mogilny, Shanahan, and Turgeon) would eventually be inducted into the Hockey Hall of Fame.

== Hockey's "Cold War" ==
Canada and the Soviet Union had engaged in an increasingly intense rivalry since the Soviets first emerged on the international scene by winning the 1954 World Ice Hockey Championships. From 1963 until 1983, the Soviets captured 17 World Championship titles amidst repeated accusations from Canada that their teams were made up of professionals masquerading as amateurs. The accusations eventually led to Canada boycotting all World Championships and Olympic hockey tournaments between 1970 and 1976. Finally, the 1972 Summit Series was organized, pitting the Soviet team against a team of Canadian NHL stars. Canada won the eight-game series 4–3–1 as Paul Henderson scored the winning goal late in the deciding contest. The Soviets handily won a second Summit Series against the World Hockey Association (WHA) all-stars in 1974. The series led to the creation of the Canada Cup, a tournament held five times between 1976 and 1991. Canada won four titles, losing to the Soviet Union in 1981. Also, from 1976 until 1991, top Soviet club teams toured North America, playing against NHL teams in what became known as the Super Series.

The World Junior Championships were formally created in 1977, and the Soviet Union had dominated the tournament to that point with seven championships. Until 1982, Canada sent either their Memorial Cup champion or an all-star team. 1982 was the first time Canada sent a national junior team, under the auspices of Hockey Canada's Program of Excellence. The Canadians won that tournament, and won again in 1985.

The "Cold War" culminated in 1987 with Rendez-vous '87, as the Soviet national team played a two-game series against the NHL all-stars in place of the NHL All-Star Game. The series was split, with the NHL winning the first game 4–3, and the Soviets the second, 5–3. The 1987 Canada Cup tournament followed; Canada won the best-of-three final over the Soviet Union two games to one, with the third game being described as the greatest in hockey history. Mario Lemieux scored the tournament-winning goal on a pass from Wayne Gretzky.

== Game summary ==
In 1987, the World Junior Hockey Championship was a round robin tournament. The teams with the top three records won the gold, silver and bronze medals. Finland had finished their schedule with a 5–1–1 record to lead the tournament with 11 points. Canada entered the game with a 4–1–1 record for nine points, and were tied for third place with Sweden, who also had nine points; however, Canada held the head-to-head tiebreaker against the Swedes and therefore had already been assured the bronze medal. The team then in the silver medal position was the host nation Czechoslovakia, who were the only team to have beaten the Canadians and had a 5–2–0 record for 10 points. A tie between the Canadians and Soviets therefore would not change the medal standings since Czechoslovakia held the head-to-head tiebreaker over Canada, but a Canadian victory against the Soviets would have guaranteed Canada at least the silver. Since Canada and Finland tied their own head-to-head matchup and for first place, had they both finished with eleven points, the championship would have been determined by the next tiebreakers, which were overall goal differential followed by goals scored – heading into the game against the Soviets the Canadians had scored four fewer goals than the Finns while conceding the same number. Therefore, simply put, a Canadian victory by five goals or more would assure them of the gold medal. The Soviet Union, entering the game with a 2–3–1 record, had already been eliminated from medal contention. The match-up between the two squads was deliberately scheduled to be the final game of the tournament, as organizers expected at least one of the teams would be playing for the gold medal.

The IIHF assigned Norway's Hans Rønning as the referee for this game. The assignment was made based on his neutrality, despite his inexperience officiating at the international level. Upon hearing of Rønning's assignment, Canadian representative Dennis McDonald sought out the IIHF supervisor of officials, René Fasel, hoping to convince him to select a different referee. Aside from the question of his competence to call a game of this magnitude, the Canadians were concerned about Rønning following an earlier tournament game he had officiated between Canada and the United States. A wild brawl had broken out during the pre-game warm-ups against the Americans three days earlier. The officials were not on the ice when the melee occurred; however, Rønning ejected one player from each team at random for starting the brawl. By rule, any player who gets into a fight in an international hockey game is automatically ejected from the remainder of the tournament. Canadian captain Steve Chiasson was thus barred from the game against the Americans, as well as the following game after being assessed a match penalty. Unable to convince IIHF officials to change the assignment, McDonald was concerned about how the game would be played. Rønning's inexperience at that level was later identified as a significant cause of the brawl, as several stick infractions by both sides had gone unpenalized, causing anger to rise between both teams.

Off the opening face-off, the Soviet Union's Sergei Shesterikov elbowed Canadian Dave McLlwain, who responded by cross-checking the Soviet player. Neither player was assessed a penalty. Five minutes in, Theoren Fleury scored the opening goal for Canada. In celebrating the goal, Fleury slid across centre ice on his knees acting as if his stick was a machine gun and pretended to "open fire" on the Soviet bench. Canadian Amateur Hockey Association (CAHA) president Murray Costello later called it an "inflammatory act, completely unnecessary, lacking any sort of respect." The first period continued in similar fashion with both teams repeatedly slashing their opponents and Canada emerging with a 3–1 lead. Interviewed by the CBC during the intermission, Fleury described the atmosphere on the ice: "The boys are up for the gold medal. Everybody is so tense. Tempers are flying. It's really tough out there ... I can't believe it. It's so tense. It's so tense."

Early in the second period, the game was paused for a moment of silence in memory of four Swift Current Broncos players who were killed when their team bus crashed in Saskatchewan five days previous. There was a drop in intensity in the five minutes of play that followed. However, just after the six-minute mark, following a minor scuffle that sent two players from each team to the penalty box, the teams resumed shoving and slashing at each other. Each team also scored a goal, giving Canada a 4–2 lead halfway through the game.

=== The brawl ===
The scoreboard in the darkened arena showing Canada leading 4–2

The brawl began after a face-off as Shesterikov collided with Everett Sanipass with 6:07 left in the second period, resulting in a fight between the two. Soviet player Pavel Kostichkin also levelled a two-handed slash at Fleury, leading to another fight. These initial altercations quickly escalated into a line brawl involving all skaters on the ice for both teams. Returning from a commercial break, Canadian commentator Don Wittman understated the severity of the fighting by saying "well, we had a real skirmish just moments ago following a face-off." Evgeny Davydov was the first player from either team to leave his bench to join the melee, prompting all players from both teams to leave their benches.

Mike Keane paired off against Valeri Zelepukin, with the Canadian "fighting like it was for the world title" according to Fleury. In another fight, Vladimir Konstantinov levelled a head-butt that broke Greg Hawgood's nose; Brendan Shanahan later described it as "the greatest head-butt I've ever seen". Stéphane Roy was pummelled by two Soviet players. The remaining players paired off as the officials attempted to break up the fighting. There were at least a dozen separate fights over the entire ice surface. Unable to control the situation, Rønning and his linesmen eventually left the ice under the orders of Czechoslovak officials. In a desperate attempt at ending the brawl, tournament officials had the arena lights turned off, leaving the players to fight in the dark as the fans whistled loudly in disapproval of the entire situation. The whole stadium shouted "My chceme hokej, my chceme hokej", which translates to "We want hockey, we want hockey". By the time the fights had finally broken up, the IIHF declared the game null and void.

=== Boxscore ===
January 4, 1987; 20:00 (Eastern European Time – UTC+2)	Canada	Game declared null and void (3–1, 1–1, Not Played)	Soviet Union	Zimný Štadión Piešťany, Piestany

Jimmy Waite
Goalies
Valeri Ivannikov
Referee:
(Norway) Hans Rønning
Linesmen:
(Finland) Peter Pomoell
(Poland) Julian Gorski

Fleury (Keane, Sanipass) – 4:34	1 – 0
	1 – 1	04:45 - Shesterikov (Zelepukin)
Latta (Hawgood) - 15:32	2 – 1
Fleury - 18:47	3 – 1
	3 – 2	31:13 - Kostichkin (Tsygurov) (PP)
Nemeth - 32:08	4 – 2

DQ – DQ
12 min
Penalties
14 min

== Aftermath ==
The IIHF held an emergency meeting in an arena office to decide how to handle the incident. Each team was represented by a delegate, and the meeting was chaired by IIHF President Günther Sabetzki. The delegates voted 7–1 in favour of ejecting both teams from the tournament, the lone dissenting vote being that of Canada's Dennis McDonald. McDonald was incensed by the voting; from the Canadians' perspective, Finland, Czechoslovakia, and Sweden all stood to gain medal position by voting the two teams out, the Americans only promised support if other nations supported Canada, and Sabetzki could barely control his disdain for the Canadians.

After voting to expel the two teams, IIHF officials banned the Soviets from the tournament banquet and medal ceremony but still invited Canada. McDonald stated the Canadians were not interested, and Sabetzki and Czechoslovak officials ordered the Canadian team out of the arena within half an hour. They were met by armed soldiers who escorted them across the border and out of Czechoslovakia. The IIHF voided the standings of both teams. In the words of McDonald, "it was like we were never here." However, the other teams kept the points they gained in the matches against both teams.

Both teams attempted to blame the other for allowing the violence to get out of hand. Soviet official Anatoly Kastriukov blamed a Canadian trainer for igniting hostilities by running over to the Soviet bench and punching one of their assistant coaches in the stomach. The Canadians, meanwhile, pointed to Davydov being the first off the bench as being the spark that led to the brawl. CBC commentator Don Cherry was one of the first to float a conspiracy theory that the Soviets had done so as a deliberate attempt to have Canada ejected, and therefore lose a medal. Alan Eagleson suggested that the IIHF's decision would have been different had it been the Soviets in contention for a medal, and not the Canadians. Soviet administrator Yuri Korolev expressed regret that the incident occurred but did not admit any guilt. He felt that the game should have been finished instead of both teams being disqualified from the tournament.

The IIHF voted to suspend all players involved from competing in international events for 18 months, and all coaches for three years. The player suspensions were later cut to six months, which allowed eligible players to participate in the 1988 tournament, and Alexander Mogilny to play in the 1988 Winter Olympics. The IIHF also considered either demoting both teams to the B pool or banning them from the 1988 tournament as further punishment, but backed off as the next year's tournament was set to be held in the Soviet Union, while Canada represented the only media revenue the tournament generated at the time.

Among the Canadians, only two players were not suspended: goalie Jimmy Waite and forward Pierre Turgeon. One other Canadian Steve Nemeth was on the ice along with Waite, but neither threw a punch. Waite felt he could not risk being ejected for fighting under the belief that the game would resume, and that the Canadian backup goaltender, Shawn Simpson, was injured. Nemeth would later apply for early reinstatement arguing that he was not fighting, but trying to help break the players apart. Turgeon was the only Canadian who did not initially leave the bench until Canadian head coach Bert Templeton convinced him to go on the ice. Regarding not leaving the bench, Turgeon stated in 2017: "that wasn't my job. I didn't have to fight." Many of their teammates never forgave Turgeon for failing to defend his teammates. In the words of Everett Sanipass: "I'm looking for someone to help (Stéphane) Roy out and I look over at the bench. There's this dog Turgeon, just sitting there, with his head down. He wouldn't get his ass off the bench ... just sitting there when everyone's off the Soviet bench and at least one of our guys is in real trouble getting double-teamed."

== Legacy ==
At the 1988 World Junior Ice Hockey Championships in Moscow, Canada and the Soviet Union won the gold and silver medals, respectively, as both teams' rosters featured several players from the 1987 tournament. Since the 1987 tournament, the two nations have maintained their dominance of the tournament. Canada has won 15 gold medals between 1988 and 2020, while the Soviet Union, and its successor, Russia, has won six.

Hans Rønning's assignment to officiate the game was viewed by other on-ice officials as a nod to organizers from Lillehammer, Norway, who had just won the right to host the 1994 Winter Olympics and were observing the game. At age 38, Rønning expected the 1987 tournament to be among his last international assignments. Rønning never officiated another international game, though he did referee two more seasons in Norway before retiring.

In Canada, public sentiment widely supported the players. Opinion polls taken in the aftermath of the brawl saw 87–92% of respondents supporting their actions. Don Cherry's passionate defence of the Canadian team led to a sharp increase in his popularity. Toronto Maple Leafs owner Harold Ballard had special gold medals made up for the Canadian team. Ballard stated that "I believe the Canadian boys deserve the gold medal and I'm going to see to it that they get them. Imagine how these Russians [sic] engineered this whole thing over there just because they've got a lousy team and were scared to go home finishing in sixth place."

Canadian hockey officials criticized the players for the brawl. In 2005, the suggestion of a reunion for the 1987 team was met with uncomfortable silence and "I don't think so" from Hockey Canada officials. Immediately following the tournament, Canadian officials were seen as trying to distance themselves from the team: "The CAHA (Canadian Amateur Hockey Association) didn't do anything for these kids", reporter Jim Cressman said. "These kids were good enough to make this team. They gave up their holidays, did their best, risked getting hurt and ended up on the wrong end of a bad decision - and the CAHA basically handed them their tickets." Winnipeg Jets assistant general manager Mike Smith was in the Vienna airport while the Canadian juniors were waiting for their flight, and took the opportunity to criticize them for their play at the tournament as well as the brawl.

Before Piešťany, the junior tournament had a small following in Canada. Only one Canadian reporter flew overseas to cover the 1987 tournament. That changed in 1988, as the major Canadian media outlets all sent reporters to Moscow. The tournament's prestige in Canada continued to grow. By the 2005 tournament, over 100 Canadian reporters covered the tournament in Grand Forks, North Dakota.

The brawl was seen as an embarrassment by Soviet officials who prided themselves on the discipline of their teams. A senior official, Anatoly Kostryukov, said that the "ice hockey department and the Ice Hockey Federation of the USSR will soon analyze the Soviet team's performance at the championship, and those guilty of the incident will be strictly punished". The Soviet media agency, Telegraph Agency of the Soviet Union, was highly critical of the coaching staff's inability to control the players. Head coach Vladimir Vasiliev was fired as the coach of the Soviet national junior team as a result of Piešťany.

== Players ==
Of the 20 players who dressed for Canada in that game, 19 went on to play in the National Hockey League. (Shawn Simpson was drafted by the Capitals, and dressed for two games for them, but ultimately only played for their associate team.) In 1987, only one Soviet had ever played in the NHL, Victor Nechayev. The players for this Soviet team would be among the first wave of Eastern Bloc players to arrive in the NHL with the fall of the Iron Curtain. Five of them would ultimately win the Stanley Cup.

Canada
1. Shawn Simpson, G
2. Greg Hawgood, D
3. Glen Wesley, D
4. Steve Chiasson, D
5. Chris Joseph, D
6. Kerry Huffman, D
8. Luke Richardson, D
9. Yvon Corriveau, F
10. Theoren Fleury, F
11. Mike Keane, F
12. Everett Sanipass, F
14. Dave McLlwain, F
15. Pat Elynuik, F
16. Scott Metcalfe, F
18. Brendan Shanahan, F
19. Steve Nemeth, F
20. Pierre Turgeon, F
21. Stéphane Roy, F
22. David Latta, F
30. Jimmy Waite, G
Soviet Union
1. Vadim Privalov, G
3. Dmitri Tsygurov, D
4. Andrei Smirnov, D
7. Igor Monayenkov, D
8. Alexander Mogilny, F
9. Sergei Fedorov, F
10. Valeri Zelepukin, F
11. Aleksandrs Kerčs, F
12. Dmitri Medvedev, F
15. Alexander Galchenyuk, F
16. Sergei Shesterikov, F
17. Anton Zagorodny, F
19. Valeri Popov, F
20. Valeri Ivannikov, G
21. Sergei Osipov, F
22. Evgeny Davydov, F
24. Vladimir Konstantinov, D
26. Vladimir Malakhov, D
27. Pavel Kostichkin, F
28. Vadim Musatov, D

== See also ==
- Fighting in ice hockey
