= List of IIHF World Junior Championship medalists =

The IIHF World Junior Championship is an annual event organized by the International Ice Hockey Federation (IIHF) for national under-20 ice hockey teams. Traditionally held from late December to the beginning of January, the main tournament features the top ten ranked hockey nations in the "top division", from which a world champion is crowned. There are also three lower pools—Divisions I, II and III—that each play separate tournaments playing for the right to be promoted to a higher pool with the last place team facing relegation to a lower pool.

Prior to the first official tournament held in 1977, there had been invitational tournaments in 1974, 1975 and 1976 not sanctioned by the IIHF. There have been 49 official tournaments as of 2025, while the 2022 tournament was postponed due to the COVID-19 pandemic. Historically, the tournament has been dominated by Canada (20 gold medals) and the Soviet Union/CIS/Russia (13 gold medals). The USSR won the first four official tournaments, while the Canadians put together five consecutive championships between 1993 and 1997, and another five consecutive from 2005 to 2009.

Since the tournament moved to a championship-game format, just three gold medal games have not featured Canada, the United States, or Russia (2001, 2014 and 2026). 1987 remains the only year in which none of the three won a medal, due to the disqualification of Canada and the Soviet Union.

== Medalists ==
The winners by season listed below.

=== Unofficial tournaments ===
Year	(gold) Gold	(silver) Silver	(bronze) Bronze	4th place	Host city (cities)	Host country (countries)
1974	Soviet Union	Finland	Canada	Sweden	Leningrad	Soviet Union
1975	Soviet Union	Canada	Sweden	Czechoslovakia	Winnipeg and Brandon; Minneapolis, Bloomington and Fargo	Canada; United States
1976	Soviet Union	Canada	Czechoslovakia	Finland	Tampere, Turku, Pori and Rauma	Finland

=== Official tournaments ===
Key

- (#) Number of tournaments (or 2nd, 3rd or 4th places) won at the time.

Year	(gold) Gold	(silver) Silver	(bronze) Bronze	4th place	Host city (cities)	Host country (countries)
1977	Soviet Union (1)	Canada (1)	Czechoslovakia (1)	Finland (1)	Zvolen and Banská Bystrica	Czechoslovakia
1978	Soviet Union (2)	Sweden (1)	Canada (1)	Czechoslovakia (1)	Montreal, Quebec City, Chicoutimi, Hull and Cornwall	Canada
1979	Soviet Union (3)	Czechoslovakia (1)	Sweden (1)	Finland (2)	Karlstad and Karlskoga	Sweden
1980	Soviet Union (4)	Finland (1)	Sweden (2)	Czechoslovakia (2)	Helsinki and Vantaa	Finland
1981	Sweden (1)	Finland (2)	Soviet Union (1)	Czechoslovakia (3)	Füssen, Landsberg and Kaufbeuren	West Germany
1982	Canada (1)	Czechoslovakia (2)	Finland (1)	Soviet Union (1)	Bloomington, Minneapolis and Duluth; Winnipeg and Kenora	United States; Canada
1983	Soviet Union (5)	Czechoslovakia (3)	Canada (2)	Sweden (1)	Leningrad	Soviet Union
1984	Soviet Union (6)	Finland (3)	Czechoslovakia (2)	Canada (1)	Norrköping and Nyköping	Sweden
1985	Canada (2)	Czechoslovakia (4)	Soviet Union (2)	Finland (3)	Helsinki and Turku	Finland
1986	Soviet Union (7)	Canada (2)	United States (1)	Czechoslovakia (4)	Hamilton, Toronto and London	Canada
1987	Finland (Note: During the final game of the tournament, Canada and the Soviet Union became engaged in a violent bench-clearing brawl while Canada was leading 4–2. Consequently, the game was declared null and void, and both teams were ejected from the tournament; while the Soviets were out of medal contention, Canada was playing for the gold medal and were guaranteed at least a bronze.) (1)	Czechoslovakia (5)	Sweden (3)	United States (1)	Piešťany, Topoľčany, Trenčín and Nitra	Czechoslovakia
1988	Canada (3)	Soviet Union (1)	Finland (2)	Czechoslovakia (5)	Moscow	Soviet Union
1989	Soviet Union (8)	Sweden (2)	Czechoslovakia (3)	Canada (2)	Anchorage and Eagle River	United States
1990	Canada (4)	Soviet Union (2)	Czechoslovakia (4)	Finland (4)	Helsinki and Turku	Finland
1991	Canada (5)	Soviet Union (3)	Czechoslovakia (5)	United States (2)	Saskatoon	Canada
1992	CIS (1)	Sweden (3)	United States (2)	Finland (5)	Füssen and Kaufbeuren	Germany
1993	Canada (6)	Sweden (4)	Czech Republic and Slovakia (6)	United States (3)	Gävle, Uppsala and Falun	Sweden
1994	Canada (7)	Sweden (5)	Russia (1)	Finland (6)	Ostrava and Frýdek-Místek	Czech Republic
1995	Canada (8)	Russia (1)	Sweden (4)	Finland (7)	Red Deer, Edmonton and Calgary	Canada
1996	Canada (9)	Sweden (6)	Russia (2)	Czech Republic (1)	Boston, Amherst and Marlborough	United States
1997	Canada (10)	United States (1)	Russia (3)	Czech Republic (2)	Geneva and Morges	Switzerland
1998	Finland (2)	Russia (2)	Switzerland (1)	Czech Republic (3)	Helsinki and Hämeenlinna	Finland
1999	Russia (1)	Canada (3)	Slovakia (1)	Sweden (2)	Winnipeg, Brandon and Selkirk	Canada
2000	Czech Republic (1)	Russia (3)	Canada (3)	United States (4)	Skellefteå and Umeå	Sweden
2001	Czech Republic (2)	Finland (4)	Canada (4)	Sweden (3)	Moscow and Podolsk	Russia
2002	Russia (2)	Canada (4)	Finland (3)	Switzerland (1)	Pardubice and Hradec Králové	Czech Republic
2003	Russia (3)	Canada (5)	Finland (4)	United States (5)	Halifax and Sydney	Canada
2004	United States (1)	Canada (6)	Finland (5)	Czech Republic (4)	Helsinki and Hämeenlinna	Finland
2005	Canada (11)	Russia (4)	Czech Republic (1)	United States (6)	Grand Forks and Thief River Falls	United States
2006	Canada (12)	Russia (5)	Finland (6)	United States (7)	Vancouver, Kelowna and Kamloops	Canada
2007	Canada (13)	Russia (6)	United States (3)	Sweden (4)	Leksand and Mora	Sweden
2008	Canada (14)	Sweden (7)	Russia (4)	United States (8)	Pardubice and Liberec	Czech Republic
2009	Canada (15)	Sweden (8)	Russia (5)	Slovakia (1)	Ottawa	Canada
2010	United States (2)	Canada (7)	Sweden (5)	Switzerland (2)	Saskatoon and Regina	Canada
2011	Russia (4)	Canada (8)	United States (4)	Sweden (5)	Buffalo and Lewiston	United States
2012	Sweden (2)	Russia (7)	Canada (5)	Finland (8)	Calgary and Edmonton	Canada
2013	United States (3)	Sweden (9)	Russia (6)	Canada (3)	Ufa	Russia
2014	Finland (3)	Sweden (10)	Russia (7)	Canada (4)	Malmö	Sweden
2015	Canada (16)	Russia (8)	Slovakia (2)	Sweden (6)	Toronto and Montreal	Canada
2016	Finland (4)	Russia (9)	United States (5)	Sweden (7)	Helsinki	Finland
2017	United States (4)	Canada (9)	Russia (8)	Sweden (8)	Montreal and Toronto	Canada
2018	Canada (17)	Sweden (11)	United States (6)	Czech Republic (5)	Buffalo and Orchard Park	United States
2019	Finland (5)	United States (2)	Russia (9)	Switzerland (3)	Vancouver and Victoria	Canada
2020	Canada (18)	Russia (10)	Sweden (6)	Finland (9)	Ostrava and Třinec	Czech Republic
2021	United States (5)	Canada (10)	Finland (7)	Russia (1)	Edmonton	Canada
2022	Canada (19)	Finland (5)	Sweden (7)	Czechia (6)	Edmonton	Canada
2023	Canada (20)	Czechia (1)	United States (7)	Sweden (9)	Halifax and Moncton	Canada
2024	United States (6)	Sweden (12)	Czechia (2)	Finland (10)	Gothenburg	Sweden
2025	United States (7)	Finland (6)	Czechia (3)	Sweden (10)	Ottawa	Canada
2026	Sweden (3)	Czechia (2)	Canada (6)	Finland (11)	Minneapolis and Saint Paul	United States
2027					Edmonton and Red Deer	Canada
2028					Tampere and Turku	Finland
2029					Quebec City and Trois-Rivières	Canada

In 2024, the IIHF announced that Canada will host the tournament every odd year until their agreement with Hockey Canada runs out in 2034.

== Medal table ==
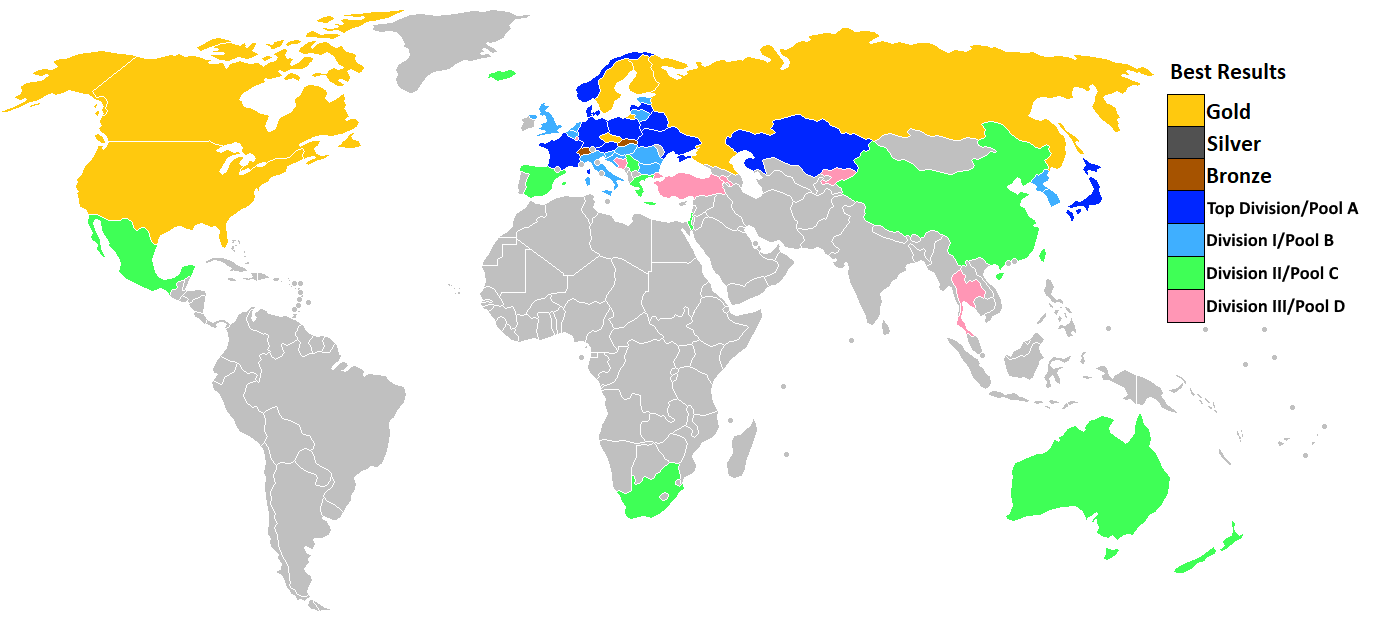
Map of countries' best results

The unofficial tournaments held prior to 1977 are not included in this table.

Countries in italics no longer compete at the World Championships.

Country	(gold) Gold	(silver) Silver	(bronze) Bronze	Medals
Canada	20	10	6	36
Russia; Soviet Union; CIS; Total	4; 8; 1; 13	10; 3; 0; 13	9; 2; 0; 11	23; 13; 1; 37
United States	7	2	7	16
Finland	5	6	7	18
Sweden	3	12	7	22
Czechia; Czechoslovakia; Total	2; 0; 2	2; 5; 7	3; 6; 9	7; 11; 18
Slovakia	0	0	2	2
Switzerland	0	0	1	1
Total	50	50	50	150

== See also ==
- List of IIHF World Championship medalists
