= André Künzi =

Swiss ice hockey player

- Born: January 10, 1967 (age 59) Bern, Switzerland
- Height: 6 ft 0 in (183 cm)
- Weight: 187 lb (85 kg; 13 st 5 lb)
- Position: Defenceman
- Shot: Left
- Played for: SC Bern; EV Zug
- National team: Switzerland
- Playing career: 1985–2002

André Künzi (born January 10, 1967) is a former Swiss ice hockey player who played for SC Bern, EV Zug in the National League A. He also played for the Switzerland men's national ice hockey team at the 1988 and 1992 Olympics as well as at the 1983, 1984, 1985, 1986 and 1987 World Junior Ice Hockey Championships.
