= Patrícia Ice Arena 37 =

Arena in Piešťany, Slovakia

Coordinates: 48°34′44″N 17°49′05″E

Easton Arena
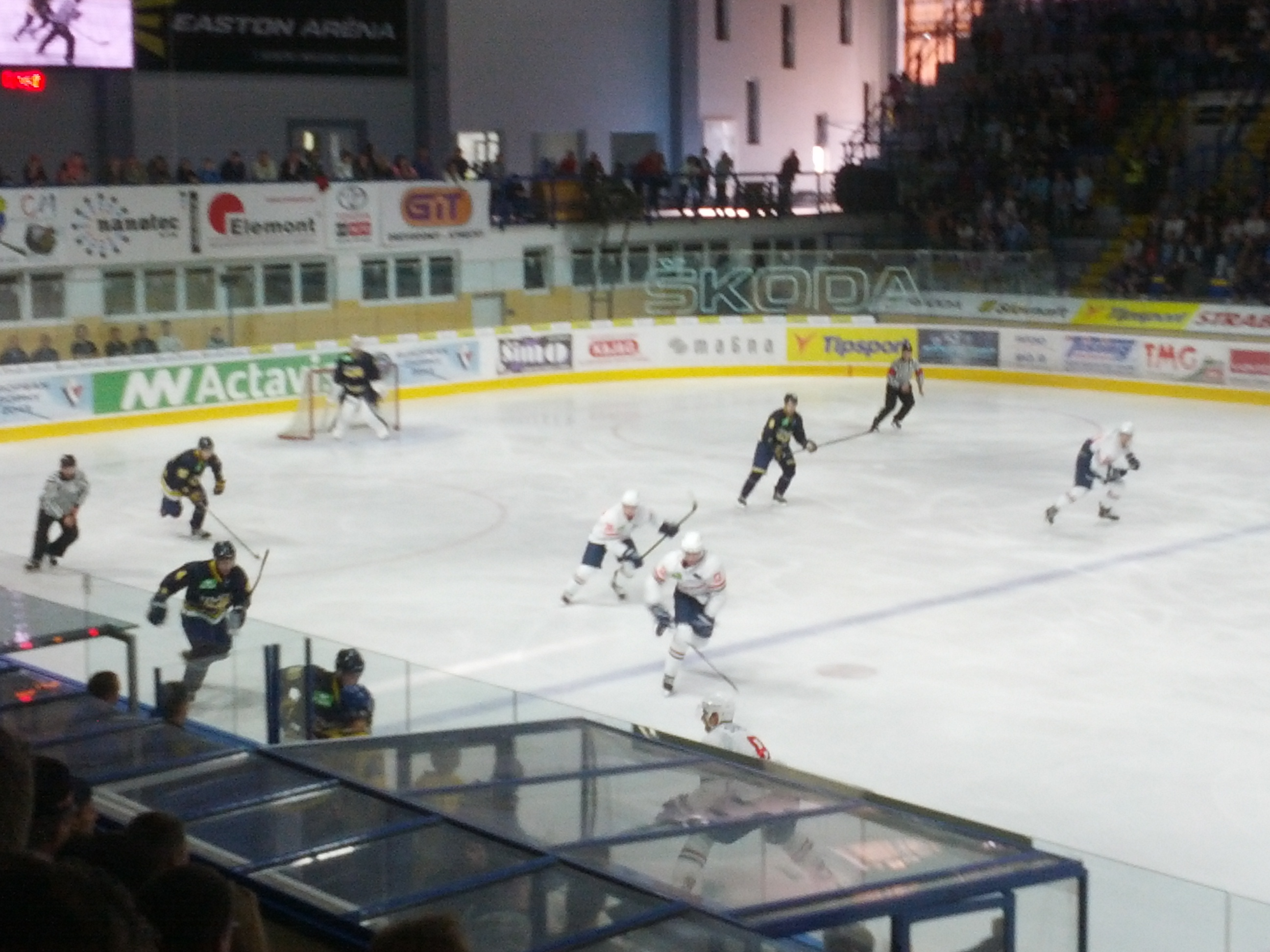
- Interactive map of Easton Arena
- Former names: Patrícia Ice Arena 37; Zimný Štadión Piešťany
- Location: Piešťany, Slovakia
- Capacity: 5,000

Construction
- Opened: 1986

Tenant
- ŠHK 37 Piešťany

Easton Arena (styled EASTON Arena, formerly Patrícia Ice Arena 37 and Zimný Štadión Piešťany) is an arena in Piešťany, Slovakia. It was built in 1986 and is primarily used for ice hockey and is the home arena of ŠHK 37 Piešťany. It also hosted matches for the 2002 IIHF World U18 Championships and is a perennial host of the Ivan Hlinka Memorial Tournament. It has a capacity of 5,000.

The arena was the primary host of the 1987 World Junior Hockey Championships, which are most notably remembered for the last game played in the tournament on January 4, 1987. In the contest between Canada and the Soviet Union, a bench-clearing brawl erupted in the second period. As the fighting got worse, the decision was made to cut the lights. The game was ultimately suspended and both teams were disqualified (the Soviets had already been eliminated from medal contention but Canada had already clinched a medal and had a chance at gold). The game was televised live in Canada on the CBC and it became a major news event in that country.

== Notable events ==
An overview of some sport events:

1987

- 1987 IIHF World Under-20 Championship

1996

- 1996 IIHF European Women Championships

2002

- 2002 IIHF World Under-18 Championship

2012

- 2012 IIHF World Under-18 Championship Division I

2022

- 2022 IIHF World Under-18 Championship Division I

== See also ==
- Punch-up in Piestany
