= Robert Kron =

- Born: February 27, 1967 (age 59) Brno, Czechoslovakia
- Height: 5 ft 10 in (178 cm)
- Weight: 174 lb (79 kg; 12 st 6 lb)
- Position: Left wing
- Shot: Left
- Played for: TJ Zetor Brno (ČSSR); Dukla Trenčín (ČSSR); Vancouver Canucks (NHL); Hartford Whalers (NHL); Carolina Hurricanes (NHL); Columbus Blue Jackets (NHL); Lukko Rauma (SM-liiga)
- National team: Czechoslovakia
- NHL draft: 88th overall, 1985; Vancouver Canucks
- Playing career: 1988–2003

Robert Kron (born February 27, 1967) is a Czech former professional ice hockey centre and currently the director of amateur scouting for the Seattle Kraken. He was formerly director of European scouting for the Carolina Hurricanes.

== Career ==
Kron was drafted in the fifth round, 88th overall, by the Vancouver Canucks in the 1985 NHL entry draft. He made his National Hockey League debut with the Canucks in the 1990–91 season. In his NHL career, he would play for the Canucks, the Hartford Whalers/Carolina Hurricanes, and the Columbus Blue Jackets.

Kron appeared in 771 NHL games, scoring 144 goals and adding 194 assists. He also appeared in 16 Stanley Cup playoff games, scoring two goals and recording three assists.

After his hockey career ended, Kron was hired by the Carolina Hurricanes as an amateur scout. Former Carolina Hurricanes teammate and current Seattle Kraken GM Ron Francis hired him as the team's director of amateur scouting in October 2020.

== Career statistics ==
=== Regular season and playoffs ===
			Regular season					Playoffs
Season	Team	League	GP	G	A	Pts	PIM	GP	G	A	Pts	PIM
1983–84	TJ Zetor Brno	CSSR U20	—	—	—	—	—	—	—	—	—	—
1983–84	TJ Lokomotiva Ingstav Brno	CZE-2	3	0	1	1	0	—	—	—	—	—
1984–85	TJ Zetor Brno	CSSR	40	6	8	14	6	—	—	—	—	—
1985–86	TJ Zetor Brno	CSSR	44	5	6	11	—	—	—	—	—	—
1986–87	TJ Zetor Brno	CSSR	34	18	11	29	10	—	—	—	—	—
1987–88	TJ Zetor Brno	CSSR	44	14	7	21	30	—	—	—	—	—
1988–89	ASVŠ Dukla Trenčín	CSSR	43	28	19	47	26	—	—	—	—	—
1989–90	ASVŠ Dukla Trenčín	CSSR	39	22	22	44	—	—	—	—	—	—
1990–91	Vancouver Canucks	NHL	76	12	20	32	21	—	—	—	—	—
1991–92	Vancouver Canucks	NHL	36	2	2	4	2	11	1	2	3	2
1992–93	Vancouver Canucks	NHL	32	10	11	21	14	—	—	—	—	—
1992–93	Hartford Whalers	NHL	13	4	2	6	4	—	—	—	—	—
1993–94	Hartford Whalers	NHL	77	24	26	50	8	—	—	—	—	—
1994–95	Hartford Whalers	NHL	37	10	8	18	10	—	—	—	—	—
1995–96	Hartford Whalers	NHL	77	22	28	50	6	—	—	—	—	—
1996–97	Hartford Whalers	NHL	68	10	12	22	10	—	—	—	—	—
1997–98	Carolina Hurricanes	NHL	81	16	20	36	12	—	—	—	—	—
1998–99	Carolina Hurricanes	NHL	75	9	16	25	10	5	1	1	2	0
1999–00	Carolina Hurricanes	NHL	81	13	27	40	8	—	—	—	—	—
2000–01	Columbus Blue Jackets	NHL	59	8	11	19	10	—	—	—	—	—
2001–02	Columbus Blue Jackets	NHL	59	4	11	15	4	—	—	—	—	—
2001–02	Syracuse Crunch	AHL	6	2	4	6	5	—	—	—	—	—
2002–03	Lukko	SM-l	23	4	8	12	6	—	—	—	—	—
CSSR totals			244	93	73	166	—	—	—	—	—	—
NHL totals			771	144	194	338	119	16	2	3	5	2

=== International ===
Year	Team	Event	GP	G	A	Pts	PIM
1984	Czechoslovakia	EJC	5	2	2	4	6
1985	Czechoslovakia	WJC	7	3	5	8	4
1985	Czechoslovakia	EJC	5	3	4	7	0
1986	Czechoslovakia	WJC	7	3	1	4	6
1987	Czechoslovakia	WJC	5	1	2	3	4
1989	Czechoslovakia	WC	10	2	2	4	2
1990	Czechoslovakia	WC	10	0	1	1	0
1991	Czechoslovakia	CC	4	0	0	0	0
Junior totals			29	12	14	26	20
Senior totals			24	2	3	5	2
