= Steve Nemeth =

Canadian ice hockey player (born 1967)

- Born: February 11, 1967 (age 58); Calgary, Alberta, Canada
- Height: 5 ft 9 in (175 cm)
- Weight: 185 lb (84 kg; 13 st 3 lb)
- Position: Centre
- Shot: Left
- Played for: New York Rangers; Sheffield Steelers
- National team: Canada
- NHL draft: 196th overall, 1985; New York Rangers
- Playing career: 1987–1999

Steve Nemeth (born February 11, 1967) is a Canadian retired ice hockey player. He played 12 games in the National Hockey League for the New York Rangers during the 1987–88 season. The rest of his career, which lasted from 1987 to 1999, was mainly spent in the United Kingdom.

== International career ==
He was part of the Canadian team that was disqualified from the 1987 World Juniors for their involvement in the Punch-up in Piestany. Nemeth was singled out as one of the players who did not fight. However, Nemeth had been involved on-ice attempting to break up various fights, and was the only Canadian to intervene when forward Stephane Roy was double-teamed by two Soviet players.

Nemeth consulted with tournament officials regarding the response to the brawl, and was told to have the players go to the locker room and await further instructions. Nemeth was the only player to challenge the initial suspension handed out by the International Ice Hockey Federation to the players involved in the brawl. The suspensions were initially to last through the end of the 1987–88 season. It was Nemeth's hope to remain eligible to play for Canada at the 1988 Winter Olympics, and though the suspensions would later be reduced to six months, Nemeth would not make the team.

== Personal life ==
Nemeth was born in Calgary, Alberta. He played his junior hockey for the Lethbridge Broncos and Kamloops Blazers.

== Career statistics ==
=== Regular season and playoffs ===
			Regular season					Playoffs
Season	Team	League	GP	G	A	Pts	PIM	GP	G	A	Pts	PIM
1982–83	Lethbridge Broncos	WHL	2	0	1	1	0	—	—	—	—	—
1983–84	Lethbridge Broncos	WHL	68	22	20	42	33	5	1	1	2	2
1984–85	Lethbridge Broncos	WHL	67	39	55	94	39	4	2	3	5	13
1985–86	Lethbridge Broncos	WHL	70	42	169	111	47	10	5	5	10	6
1986–87	Kamloops Blazers	WHL	10	10	4	14	0	13	11	9	20	12
1986–87	Canadian National Team	Intl	43	14	7	21	12	—	—	—	—	—
1987–88	New York Rangers	NHL	12	2	0	2	2	—	—	—	—	—
1987–88	Colorado Rangers	IHL	57	13	24	37	28	10	2	1	3	8
1988–89	Denver Rangers	IHL	11	5	2	7	8	—	—	—	—	—
1988–89	Canadian National Team	Intl	26	6	10	16	10	—	—	—	—	—
1989–90	Canadian National Team	Intl	73	24	42	66	40	—	—	—	—	—
1990–91	Krefelder EV	GER-2	15	7	16	23	16	—	—	—	—	—
1991–92	Sheffield Steelers	BD2	25	92	94	186	28	—	—	—	—	—
1991–92	Canadian National Team	Intl	1	1	0	1	0	—	—	—	—	—
1992–93	Sheffield Steelers	BD1	32	67	64	131	67	—	—	—	—	—
1993–94	Sheffield Steelers	BHL	35	40	59	99	67	5	4	6	10	6
1994–95	Sheffield Steelers	BHL	41	54	51	105	39	7	1	3	4	0
1995–96	Sheffield Steelers	BHL	31	28	27	55	24	8	5	5	10	10
1996–97	Sheffield Steelers	BISL	9	0	5	5	4	—	—	—	—	—
1997–98	Tacoma Sabercats	WCHL	33	5	8	13	12	—	—	—	—	—
1998–99	Kingston Hawks	BNL	6	2	3	5	4	—	—	—	—	—
BHL totals			107	122	137	259	130	20	10	14	24	16
NHL totals			12	2	0	4	2	—	—	—	—	—

=== International ===
Year	Team	Event	GP	G	A	Pts	PIM
1987	Canada	WJC	6	4	4	8	4
Junior totals			6	4	4	8	4
