= Roger Öhman =

Swedish retired ice hockey defenseman (born 1967)

- Born: June 5, 1967 (age 59) Limhamn, Malmö, Sweden Family, Wife is Jessika Öhman (born 1970) and children Victor Öhman (born 1992) and Moa Öhman (born 2000)
- Height: 6 ft 3 in (191 cm)
- Weight: 216 lb (98 kg; 15 st 6 lb)
- Position: Defence
- Shot: Left
- Played for: Leksands IF; Moncton Hawks; AIK IF; Malmö IF; Kassel Huskies; EC KAC; HC La Chaux-de-Fonds
- NHL draft: 39th overall, 1985; Winnipeg Jets
- Playing career: 1985–2004

Roger Öhman (born 5 June 1967) is a Swedish retired ice hockey defenseman. He was selected 39th overall by the Winnipeg Jets in the 1985 NHL Entry Draft. Öhman had five goals and six assists at the 1987 World Junior Ice Hockey Championships. He played 17 years in the European professional leagues, with one year in the AHL. He is an U-20 coach in Klagenfurt (2025).

== Career ==
Öhman started his career with Leksands IF in Sweden. For the 1987-88 season, he played for the Moncton Hawks of the AHL, getting 28 points in 67 games. The following year he would return to Sweden, where he would play until 1995-96. He played mainly for Malmö IF, with two years for AIK. In 1996-97 and 1997–98, Öhman played for the Kassel Huskies In Germany, getting 63 points in 86 games. Ohman spent the next three years with Klagenfurt AC in Austria and HC La Chaux-de-Fonds in Switzerland. From 2000-01 to 2002-03, Öhman returned to Sweden to play for Malmö IF. Öhman retired in 2004.

Öhman coached Djurgårdens IF women's team in the 2017–18 season.

From the season 18/19 Ohman was coach for the U-18 team in Klagenfurt EC KAC. From the season 24/25 he is head coach for the U-20 team in Klagenfurt EC KAC. He was a professional player in the club from 97-00.

== Career statistics ==
=== Regular season and playoffs ===
			Regular season					Playoffs
Season	Team	League	GP	G	A	Pts	PIM	GP	G	A	Pts	PIM
1981–82	IK Skäret	SWE.2	10	2	0	2	—	—	—	—	—	—
1982–83	IK Skäret	SWE.3	—	—	—	—	—	—	—	—	—	—
1983–84	Leksands IF	SWE U20	—	—	—	—	—	—	—	—	—	—
1984–85	Leksands IF	SWE U20	—	—	—	—	—	—	—	—	—	—
1984–85	Leksands IF	SEL	5	0	0	0	0	—	—	—	—	—
1985–86	Västra Frölunda HC	SWE.2	32	12	9	21	30	3	1	4	5	0
1986–87	Västra Frölunda HC	SWE.2	26	4	10	14	16	2	0	1	1	0
1987–88	Moncton Hawks	AHL	67	11	17	28	38	—	—	—	—	—
1988–89	AIK	SEL	36	10	8	18	20	2	1	0	1	4
1989–90	AIK	SEL	38	8	17	25	22	3	0	0	0	0
1990–91	Malmö IF	SEL	40	11	7	18	24	1	0	0	0	0
1991–92	Malmö IF	SEL	40	11	19	30	20	10	3	1	4	6
1992–93	Malmö IF	SEL	39	13	11	24	20	6	0	2	2	4
1993–94	Malmö IF	SEL	36	8	9	17	22	11	2	2	4	4
1994–95	Malmö IF	SEL	40	8	10	18	18	9	1	4	5	0
1995–96	Malmö IF	SEL	38	8	9	17	41	5	1	4	5	8
1996–97	Kassel Huskies	DEL	50	18	29	47	10	10	5	10	15	0
1997–98	Kassel Huskies	DEL	34	3	12	15	6	3	1	1	2	0
1998–99	EC KAC	AUT	22	5	14	19	10	—	—	—	—	—
1998–99	EC KAC	AL	33	9	19	28	2	—	—	—	—	—
1999–2000	EC KAC	AUT	16	3	4	7	8	—	—	—	—	—
1999–2000	EC KAC	IEHL	31	14	20	34	8	—	—	—	—	—
2000–01	HC La Chaux–de–Fonds	NLA	27	2	9	11	22	—	—	—	—	—
2000–01	MIF Redhawks	SEL	20	5	5	10	12	9	2	2	4	0
2001–02	MIF Redhawks	SEL	43	6	5	11	18	5	0	0	0	6
2002–03	MIF Redhawks	SEL	31	1	7	8	14	—	—	—	—	—
2003–04	Mörrums GoIS	Allsv	9	0	1	1	10	—	—	—	—	—
SEL totals			406	89	107	196	231	61	10	15	25	32

=== International ===
Year	Team	Event	GP	G	A	Pts	PIM
1985	Sweden	EJC	4	1	0	1	—
1986	Sweden	WJC	7	1	2	3	12
1987	Sweden	WJC	7	5	6	11	4
Junior totals			18	7	8	15	—
