= Mike Keane =

Canadian ice hockey player

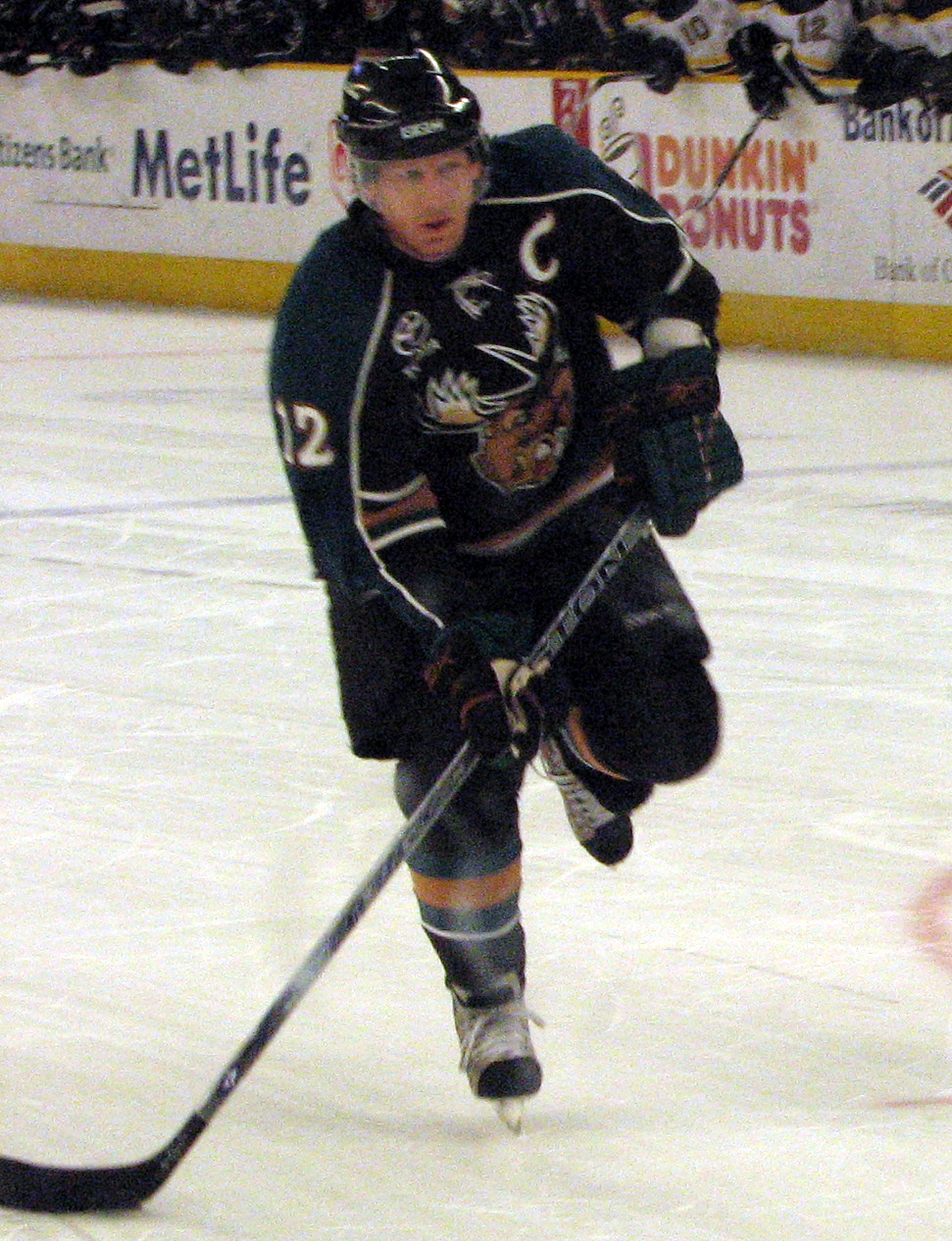
- Keane with the Manitoba Moose in 2009
- Born: May 29, 1967 (age 59) Winnipeg, Manitoba, Canada
- Height: 5 ft 10 in (178 cm)
- Weight: 185 lb (84 kg; 13 st 3 lb)
- Position: Right wing
- Shot: Right
- Played for: Montreal Canadiens; Colorado Avalanche; New York Rangers; Dallas Stars; St. Louis Blues; Vancouver Canucks
- National team: Canada
- NHL draft: Undrafted
- Playing career: 1987–2010

Michael John Keane (born May 29, 1967) is a Canadian former professional ice hockey winger. Undrafted, Keane played over 1,100 games in the National Hockey League (NHL) from 1988 until 2004. He then played five seasons for his hometown Manitoba Moose of the American Hockey League until he retired in 2010. Keane is a three-time Stanley Cup champion, having won with the Montreal Canadiens in 1993, Colorado Avalanche in 1996, and the Dallas Stars in 1999. On September 3, 2013, the Winnipeg Jets announced the hiring of Keane as Assistant of Player Development.

== Playing career ==
Keane began his junior hockey career in the Junior A Manitoba Junior Hockey League (MJHL) with the Winnipeg South Blues. He then joined the major junior ranks in the Western Hockey League (WHL) with the Moose Jaw Warriors.

Undrafted out of junior hockey, Keane signed as a free agent on September 25, 1985, with the Montreal Canadiens and started his NHL career in 1988. He helped the Canadiens to a Stanley Cup championship in 1993, his fifth NHL season. He spent eight seasons in Montreal and was captain of the team from April 1995 to December 1995. After Kirk Muller was traded near the end of the 1994–95 season, Keane was named as the 24th captain of the Montreal Canadiens. Keane was subject to media scrutiny after speaking to Mathias Brunet of La Presse (a French language newspaper). Keane declared that he had no intention of learning French. He drew controversy in the French media after saying he did not believe it was necessary to speak French, since players on the team spoke predominantly English.

During the 1995–96 NHL season, Keane was traded along with Patrick Roy to the Colorado Avalanche in exchange for Jocelyn Thibault, Andrei Kovalenko, and Martin Ručinský. He won his second Stanley Cup that season, helping the Avalanche defeat the Florida Panthers in four games in the Final. Keane spent another season with the Avalanche, before becoming a free agent in the summer of 1997. He signed with the New York Rangers, where he played for half a season before the Rangers traded Keane, Brian Skrudland, and the Rangers' 1998 6th round draft choice (Pavel Patera) to the Dallas Stars in exchange for Todd Harvey, Bob Errey, and the Stars' 1998 4th round draft choice (Boyd Kane). Keane played in Dallas until 2000–01, helping the Stars win the Stanley Cup in 1999 and returning to the finals the next year. He started the 2001–02 NHL season with the St. Louis Blues but finished that season back with Colorado. Keane stayed in Colorado until he left for the Vancouver Canucks at the start of the 2003–04 NHL season.

After the 2004–05 lockout, Keane signed with his hometown team, the Manitoba Moose, for the 2005–06 AHL season. Keane played five seasons for the Moose. He was named captain in 2005 and remained Manitoba's captain until July 20, 2010, when his contract was not renewed. Keane was also captain of the AHL All-Star Team Canada in 2007. Keane's number 12 jersey was retired February 12, 2011, when the Manitoba Moose took on the San Antonio Rampage at Bell MTS Place. Keane's number was the first number retired in Manitoba Moose history.

== International play ==
Keane competed for Team Canada at the 1987 World Junior Championships in Czechoslovakia. While playing for the gold medal against the Soviet Union, both teams were disqualified as a result of the infamous Punch-up in Piestany.

== Career statistics ==
=== Regular season and playoffs ===
			Regular season					Playoffs
Season	Team	League	GP	G	A	Pts	PIM	GP	G	A	Pts	PIM
1983–84	Winnipeg Monarchs AAA	MMHL	21	17	19	36	59	—	—	—	—	—
1983–84	Winnipeg Warriors	WHL	1	0	0	0	0	—	—	—	—	—
1984–85	Moose Jaw Warriors	WHL	65	17	26	43	141	—	—	—	—	—
1985–86	Moose Jaw Warriors	WHL	67	34	49	83	162	13	6	8	14	9
1986–87	Moose Jaw Warriors	WHL	53	25	45	70	107	9	3	9	12	11
1986–87	Sherbrooke Canadiens	AHL	—	—	—	—	—	9	2	2	4	16
1987–88	Sherbrooke Canadiens	AHL	78	25	43	68	70	6	1	1	2	18
1988–89	Montreal Canadiens	NHL	69	16	19	35	69	21	4	3	7	17
1989–90	Montreal Canadiens	NHL	74	9	15	24	78	11	0	1	1	8
1990–91	Montreal Canadiens	NHL	73	13	23	36	50	12	3	2	5	6
1991–92	Montreal Canadiens	NHL	67	11	30	41	64	8	1	1	2	16
1992–93	Montreal Canadiens	NHL	77	15	45	60	95	19	2	13	15	6
1993–94	Montreal Canadiens	NHL	80	16	30	46	119	6	3	1	4	4
1994–95	Montreal Canadiens	NHL	48	10	10	20	15	—	—	—	—	—
1995–96	Montreal Canadiens	NHL	18	0	7	7	6	—	—	—	—	—
1995–96	Colorado Avalanche	NHL	55	10	10	20	40	22	3	2	5	16
1996–97	Colorado Avalanche	NHL	81	10	17	27	63	17	3	1	4	24
1997–98	New York Rangers	NHL	70	8	10	18	47	—	—	—	—	—
1997–98	Dallas Stars	NHL	13	2	3	5	5	17	4	4	8	0
1998–99	Dallas Stars	NHL	81	6	23	29	62	23	5	2	7	6
1999–00	Dallas Stars	NHL	81	13	21	34	41	23	2	4	6	14
2000–01	Dallas Stars	NHL	67	10	14	24	35	10	3	2	5	4
2001–02	St. Louis Blues	NHL	56	4	6	10	22	—	—	—	—	—
2001–02	Colorado Avalanche	NHL	22	2	5	7	16	18	1	4	5	8
2002–03	Colorado Avalanche	NHL	65	5	5	10	34	6	0	0	0	2
2003–04	Vancouver Canucks	NHL	64	8	9	17	20	7	0	0	0	4
2005–06	Manitoba Moose	AHL	69	3	11	14	66	12	2	1	3	4
2006–07	Manitoba Moose	AHL	74	8	17	25	46	13	2	2	4	7
2007–08	Manitoba Moose	AHL	73	8	8	16	36	6	0	0	0	6
2008–09	Manitoba Moose	AHL	74	8	20	28	47	22	4	7	11	6
2009–10	Manitoba Moose	AHL	75	9	22	31	49	6	0	2	2	7
NHL totals			1,161	168	302	470	881	220	34	40	74	135
AHL totals			443	61	121	182	314	74	11	15	26	59

=== International ===
Year	Team	Event	Result	GP	G	A	Pts	PIM
1987	Canada	WJC	DQ	6	0	1	1	4
Junior totals				6	0	1	1	4

== Awards and honours ==
Award	Year	Ref
NHL
Stanley Cup champion	1993, 1996, 1999	
AHL
All-Star Game	2006	
Fred T. Hunt Memorial Award	2006	

== See also ==
- List of NHL players with 1,000 games played

Sporting positions
Preceded by Kirk Muller	Montreal Canadiens captain 1995	Succeeded by Pierre Turgeon
