= Greg Hawgood =

Canadian ice hockey player (born 1968)

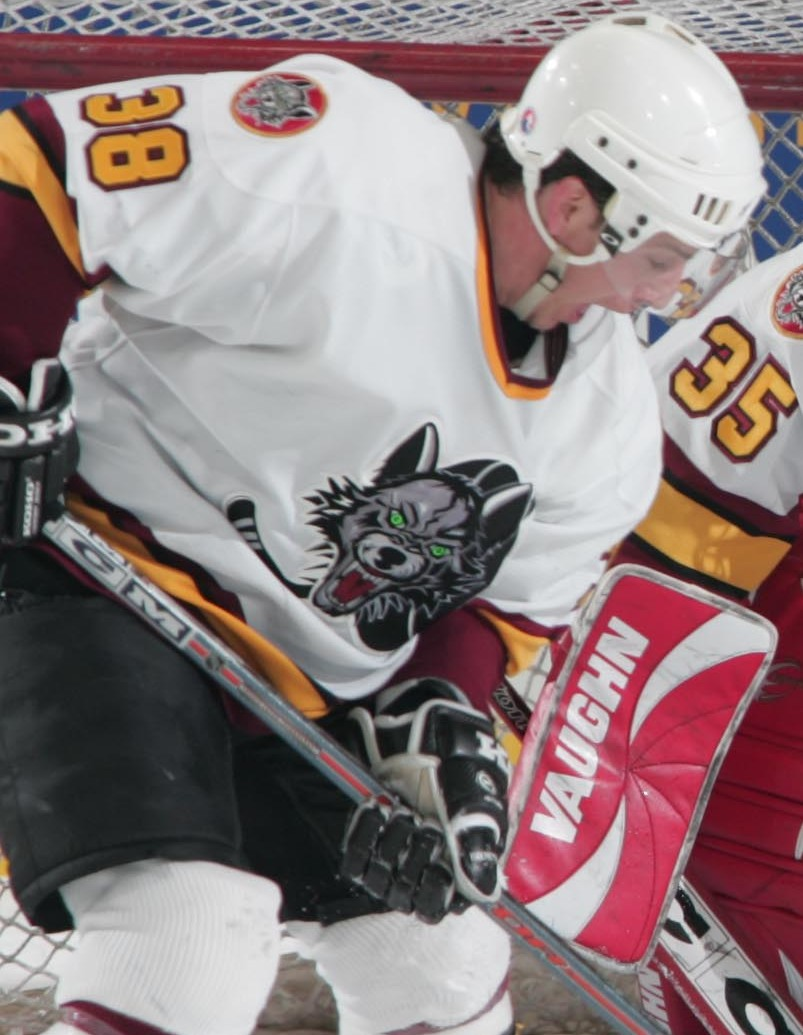
- Hawgood with the Chicago Wolves in 2004
- Born: August 10, 1968 (age 57) Edmonton, Alberta, Canada
- Height: 5 ft 10 in (178 cm)
- Weight: 204 lb (93 kg; 14 st 8 lb)
- Position: Defence
- Shot: Left
- Played for: Boston Bruins; Edmonton Oilers; Philadelphia Flyers; Florida Panthers; Pittsburgh Penguins; San Jose Sharks; Vancouver Canucks; Dallas Stars; HC Asiago; Tappara Tampere; TPS Turku
- NHL draft: 202nd overall, 1986; Boston Bruins
- Playing career: 1988–2006

Gregory William Hawgood (born August 10, 1968) is a Canadian former professional ice hockey defenceman who played in the National Hockey League (NHL) with the Boston Bruins, Edmonton Oilers, Philadelphia Flyers, Florida Panthers, Pittsburgh Penguins, San Jose Sharks, Vancouver Canucks and Dallas Stars. Hawgood was born in Edmonton, Alberta.

== Playing career ==
Hawgood spent his junior career with the Kamloops Blazers of the WHL, and made such an impression that the Blazers retired his #4 sweater. He represented Canada twice at the World Junior Championships, including the infamous Punch-up in Piestany at the 1987 tournament. (Hawgood emerged from the brawl with a broken nose, thanks to a head butt from Vladimir Konstantinov.) Hawgood was named to the all-star team at the following year's WJC in Moscow, leading Canada to the gold medal.

Hawgood was selected by the Boston Bruins in the tenth round of the 1986 NHL Draft. He would spend two decades in pro hockey; he would wind up donning the sweaters of seven other NHL clubs, as well as several minor league and European teams, before finally retiring as a player in 2006.

Hawgood is currently an amateur scout for the Detroit Red Wings.

== Coaching career ==
On November 8, 2007, Hawgood was named head coach of the Blazers. Hawgood then moved to the position of Coach and finally Assistant Coach with the Kamloops Storm of the KIJHL. He started the 2009–2010 season as Head Coach, but lost that position due to the continued poor performance of the team. It was announced before the start of the 2010–2011 season that he would not be continuing with the team in any capacity.

== Awards ==
- WHL West First All-Star Team – 1986, 1987, 1988
- 1988 World Junior Ice Hockey Championships - tournament all-star team
- Eddie Shore Award – 1991–92
- Governor's Trophy – 1995–96
- Larry D. Gordon Trophy – 1998–99

== Career statistics ==
=== Regular season and playoffs ===
			Regular season					Playoffs
Season	Team	League	GP	G	A	Pts	PIM	GP	G	A	Pts	PIM
1983–84	St. Albert Saints	AJHL	19	4	14	18	33	—	—	—	—	—
1983–84	Kamloops Junior Oilers	WHL	49	10	23	33	39	6	0	2	2	2
1983–84	Kamloops Junior Oilers	MC	—	—	—	—	—	3	0	1	1	0
1984–85	Kamloops Blazers	WHL	66	25	40	65	72	15	3	15	18	15
1985–86	Kamloops Blazers	WHL	71	34	85	119	86	16	9	22	31	16
1985–86	Kamloops Blazers	MC	—	—	—	—	—	5	3	6	9	6
1986–87	Kamloops Blazers	WHL	61	30	93	123	139	13	7	16	23	18
1987–88	Boston Bruins	NHL	1	0	0	0	0	3	1	0	1	0
1987–88	Kamloops Blazers	WHL	63	48	85	133	142	16	10	16	26	33
1988–89	Boston Bruins	NHL	56	16	24	40	84	10	0	2	2	2
1988–89	Maine Mariners	AHL	21	2	9	11	41	—	—	—	—	—
1989–90	Boston Bruins	NHL	77	11	27	38	76	15	1	3	4	12
1990–91	Cape Breton Oilers	AHL	55	10	32	42	73	4	0	3	3	23
1990–91	Edmonton Oilers	NHL	6	0	1	1	6	—	—	—	—	—
1990–91	HC Asiago	ITA	2	0	3	3	9	—	—	—	—	—
1990–91	Maine Mariners	AHL	5	0	1	1	13	—	—	—	—	—
1991–92	Cape Breton Oilers	AHL	56	20	55	75	26	3	2	2	4	0
1991–92	Edmonton Oilers	NHL	20	2	11	13	22	13	0	3	3	23
1992–93	Edmonton Oilers	NHL	29	5	13	18	35	—	—	—	—	—
1992–93	Philadelphia Flyers	NHL	40	6	22	28	39	—	—	—	—	—
1993–94	Philadelphia Flyers	NHL	19	3	12	15	19	—	—	—	—	—
1993–94	Florida Panthers	NHL	33	2	14	16	9	—	—	—	—	—
1993–94	Pittsburgh Penguins	NHL	12	1	2	3	8	1	0	0	0	0
1994–95	Pittsburgh Penguins	NHL	21	1	4	5	25	—	—	—	—	—
1994–95	Cleveland Lumberjacks	IHL	—	—	—	—	—	3	1	0	1	4
1995–96	Las Vegas Thunder	IHL	78	20	65	85	101	15	5	11	16	24
1996–97	San Jose Sharks	NHL	63	6	12	18	69	—	—	—	—	—
1997–98	Kölner Haie	DEL	4	0	1	1	16	—	—	—	—	—
1997–98	Houston Aeros	IHL	81	19	52	71	75	4	0	4	4	0
1998–99	Houston Aeros	IHL	76	17	57	74	90	19	4	8	12	24
1999–2000	Vancouver Canucks	NHL	79	5	17	22	26	—	—	—	—	—
2000–01	Vancouver Canucks	NHL	16	2	5	7	6	—	—	—	—	—
2000–01	Kansas City Blades	IHL	46	6	16	22	21	—	—	—	—	—
2001–02	Dallas Stars	NHL	2	0	0	0	2	—	—	—	—	—
2001–02	Utah Grizzlies	AHL	67	18	43	61	83	5	0	2	2	2
2002–03	Utah Grizzlies	AHL	70	15	42	57	76	2	1	0	1	14
2003–04	Chicago Wolves	AHL	78	6	35	41	62	10	1	2	3	29
2004–05	Chicago Wolves	AHL	72	8	39	47	50	—	—	—	—	—
2005–06	Tappara	SM-l	18	1	3	4	36	—	—	—	—	—
2005–06	TPS	SM-l	21	0	2	2	70	2	0	1	1	2
2008–09	Steinbach North Stars	AC	—	—	—	—	—	2	0	4	4	0
NHL totals			474	60	164	224	426	42	2	8	10	37
AHL totals			424	79	256	335	424	24	4	9	13	68
IHL totals			281	62	190	252	287	41	10	23	33	52

=== International ===
Year	Team	Event	GP	G	A	Pts	PIM
1987	Canada	WJC	6	2	2	4	6
1988	Canada	WJC	7	1	8	9	6
Junior totals			13	3	10	13	12
