= Valeri Zelepukin =

Russian ice hockey player

- Born: 17 September 1968 (age 57) Voskresensk, Russian SFSR, Soviet Union
- Height: 6 ft 0 in (183 cm)
- Weight: 207 lb (94 kg; 14 st 11 lb)
- Position: Left wing
- Shot: Left
- Played for: USSR; Khimik Voskresensk; CSKA Moscow; NHL; New Jersey Devils; Edmonton Oilers; Philadelphia Flyers; Chicago Blackhawks; RSL; Ak Bars Kazan; SKA Saint Petersburg; Khimik Mytishchi
- National team: Soviet Union and Russia
- NHL draft: 221st overall, 1990; New Jersey Devils
- Playing career: 1984–2006

Valeri Mikhailovich Zelepukin (Russian: Валерий Михайлович Зелепукин; born 17 September 1968) is a Russian former professional ice hockey player who played in the National Hockey League (NHL) for the New Jersey Devils, Edmonton Oilers, Philadelphia Flyers and the Chicago Blackhawks between 1991 and 2001. Born in Voskresensk in the former Soviet Union, he was drafted 221st overall in the 11th round by the Devils in the 1990 NHL entry draft and went on to play 595 regular season games, scoring 117 goals and 177 assists for 294 points. He also picked up 527 penalty minutes.

Zelepukin scored his most famous goal while with New Jersey in game seven of the 1994 Eastern Conference Finals against the arch-rival New York Rangers. With 7.7 seconds left on the clock and the Rangers leading 1-0, teammate Claude Lemieux centred the puck to Zelepukin in front of the net. After a couple of attempts, Zelepukin buried the puck past Ranger goaltender Mike Richter to tie the game. Richter protested to referee Bill McCreary that he had been interfered with, but the goal stood. Zelepukin's goal went for nought, however, when New York's Stéphane Matteau scored a dramatic wrap-around goal on Devils goaltender Martin Brodeur in double-overtime to win the game and the series for the Rangers. The Rangers would go on to defeat the Vancouver Canucks to win their first Stanley Cup in 54 years, but Zelepukin and the Devils redeemed themselves the next year, when they won their first Stanley Cup championship in a four-game sweep of the Detroit Red Wings.

Zelepukin also coached KHL team Metallurg Novokuznetsk during the 2016-17 season. However, Zelepukin was fired after the team had a 1-8-0 record.

== Career statistics ==
=== Regular season and playoffs ===
			Regular season					Playoffs
Season	Team	League	GP	G	A	Pts	PIM	GP	G	A	Pts	PIM
1984–85	Khimik Voskresensk	USSR	5	0	0	0	2	—	—	—	—	—
1985–86	Khimik Voskresensk	USSR	33	2	2	4	10	—	—	—	—	—
1986–87	Khimik Voskresensk	USSR	19	1	0	1	4	—	—	—	—	—
1987–88	CSKA Moscow	USSR	19	3	1	4	8	—	—	—	—	—
1987–88	SKA MVO Kalinin	USSR II	45	18	6	24	52	—	—	—	—	—
1988–89	CSKA Moscow	USSR	17	2	3	5	2	—	—	—	—	—
1989–90	Khimik Voskresensk	USSR	46	17	14	31	26	—	—	—	—	—
1990–91	Khimik Voskresensk	USSR	34	11	6	17	26	—	—	—	—	—
1991–92	New Jersey Devils	NHL	44	13	18	31	28	4	1	1	2	2
1991–92	Utica Devils	AHL	22	20	9	29	8	—	—	—	—	—
1992–93	New Jersey Devils	NHL	78	23	41	64	70	5	0	2	2	0
1993–94	New Jersey Devils	NHL	82	26	31	57	70	20	5	2	7	14
1994–95	New Jersey Devils	NHL	4	1	2	3	6	18	1	2	3	12
1995–96	New Jersey Devils	NHL	61	6	9	15	107	—	—	—	—	—
1996–97	New Jersey Devils	NHL	71	14	24	38	36	8	3	2	5	2
1997–98	New Jersey Devils	NHL	35	2	8	10	32	—	—	—	—	—
1997–98	Edmonton Oilers	NHL	33	2	10	12	57	8	1	2	3	2
1998–99	Philadelphia Flyers	NHL	74	16	9	25	48	4	1	0	1	4
1999–2000	Philadelphia Flyers	NHL	77	11	21	32	55	18	1	2	3	12
2000–01	Chicago Blackhawks	NHL	36	3	4	7	18	—	—	—	—	—
2000–01	Norfolk Admirals	AHL	29	10	9	19	28	9	5	3	8	6
2001–02	Norfolk Admirals	AHL	27	8	10	18	29	4	0	1	1	2
2002–03	Ak Bars Kazan	RSL	27	5	8	13	72	5	1	1	2	4
2003–04	SKA St. Petersburg	RSL	58	19	15	34	92	—	—	—	—	—
2004–05	SKA St. Petersburg	RSL	48	4	6	10	102	—	—	—	—	—
2005–06	Khimik Moscow Oblast	RSL	33	3	8	11	28	4	1	0	1	2
USSR totals			173	36	26	62	78	—	—	—	—	—
NHL totals			595	117	177	294	527	85	13	13	26	48
RSL totals			166	31	37	68	294	9	2	1	3	6

=== International ===
Olympic medal record

Representing Russia

Men's Ice hockey
Silver medal – second place	1998 Nagano	Team

Year	Team	Event	Place	GP	G	A	Pts	PIM
1986	Soviet Union	EJC	4th	5	3	0	3	4
1987	Soviet Union	WJC	DSQ	6	2	1	3	4
1988	Soviet Union	WJC	2nd place, silver medalist(s)	7	6	1	7	4
1991	Soviet Union	WC	3rd place, bronze medalist(s)	9	0	4	4	5
1996	Russia	WCH	SF	3	0	0	0	20
1998	Russia	OG	2nd place, silver medalist(s)	6	1	2	3	0
2004	Russia	WC	10th	6	0	2	2	4
Junior totals				18	11	2	13	12
Senior totals				24	1	8	9	29
