= Valery Ivannikov =

Russian ice hockey player (born 1967)

Personal information
- Nationality: Russian
- Born: 28 January 1967 (age 58) Chelyabinsk, Russian SFSR, Soviet Union

Sport
- Sport: Ice hockey

Valery Ivannikov (born 28 January 1967) is a Russian ice hockey player. He competed in the men's tournament at the 1994 Winter Olympics. Ivannikov was the Soviet goaltender in the infamous Punch-up in Piestany game at the 1987 World Junior Ice Hockey Championships.
