= Dave McLlwain =

Canadian ice hockey player (born 1967)

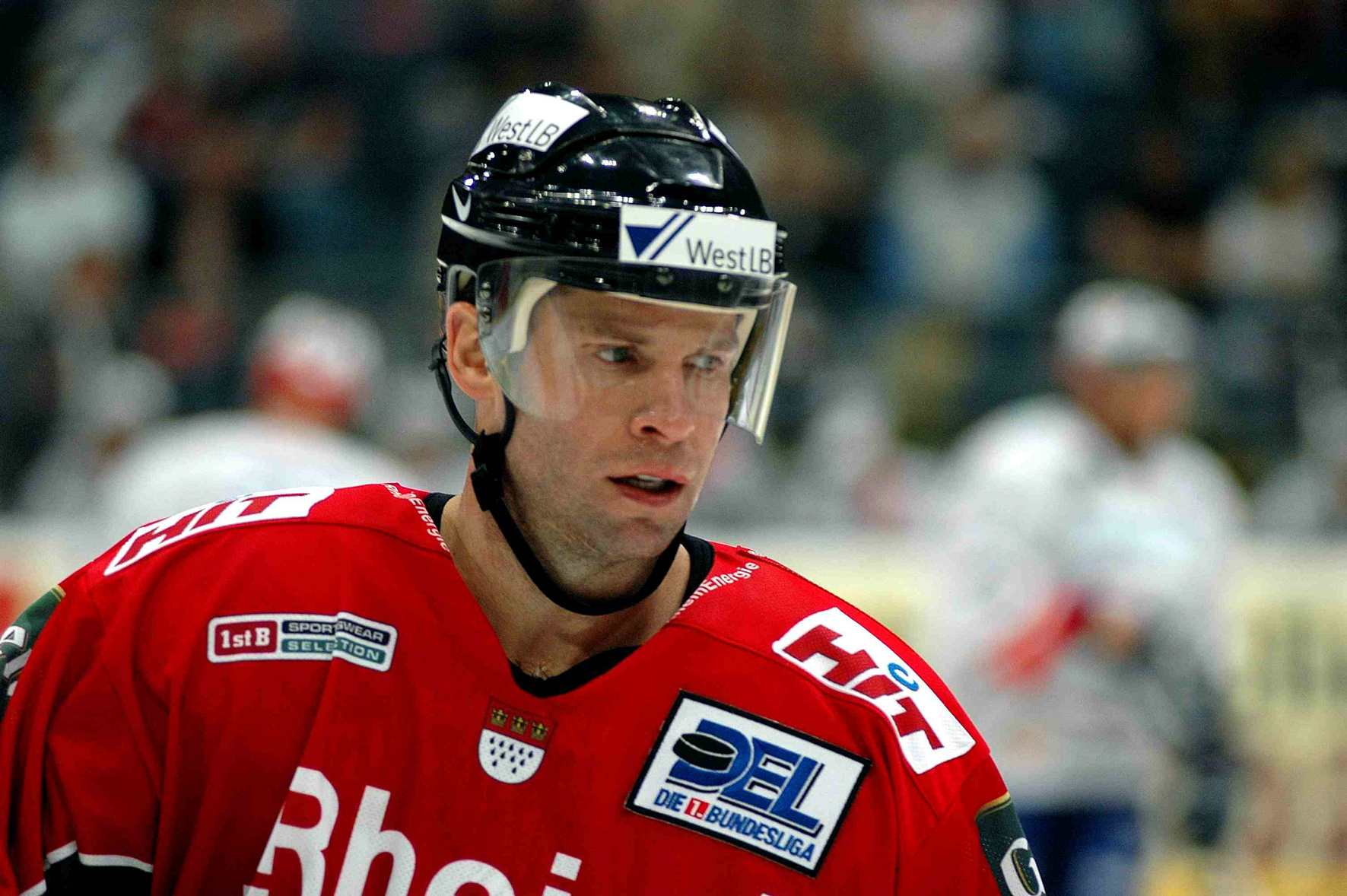
- Born: June 9, 1967 (age 59) Seaforth, Ontario, Canada
- Height: 6 ft 0 in (183 cm)
- Weight: 185 lb (84 kg; 13 st 3 lb)
- Position: Centre/Right Wing
- Shot: Left
- Played for: Pittsburgh Penguins; Winnipeg Jets; New York Islanders; Buffalo Sabres; Toronto Maple Leafs; Ottawa Senators; EV Landshut; SC Bern; Kölner Haie
- NHL draft: 172nd overall, 1986; Pittsburgh Penguins
- Playing career: 1987–2009

David Allan McLlwain (born June 9, 1967) is a Canadian former professional ice hockey player. McLlwain is best known for playing for a record four National Hockey League (NHL) teams (the Winnipeg Jets, the New York Islanders, the Buffalo Sabres, and the Toronto Maple Leafs) in one season during the 1991–92 season. This record is shared with Dennis O'Brien, Mark Arcobello and Jussi Jokinen. He may also hold the NHL record for the most consecutive consonants at the start of a surname.

== Playing career ==
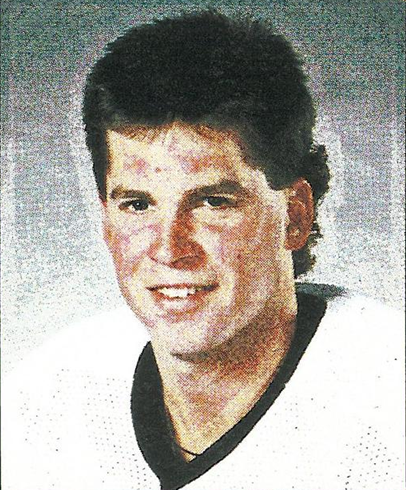
1987 card of McLlwain for Pittsburgh Penguins

Dave McLlwain played junior hockey in the Ontario Hockey League (OHL) with the Kitchener Rangers and North Bay Centennials. In his final year of junior he scored 46 goals and 119 points and represented Canada at the 1987 World Junior Ice Hockey Championships, famous for the Punch-up in Piestany brawl in the final game.

McLlwain was drafted by the Pittsburgh Penguins in the ninth round, 172nd overall in the 1986 NHL Entry Draft. During his NHL career, McLlwain bounced around from team to team frequently. He played for the Penguins (twice), the Winnipeg Jets, the New York Islanders (twice), the Buffalo Sabres, the Toronto Maple Leafs, and the Ottawa Senators. He played his final game in the NHL on March 29, 1997, for the Islanders against the Bruins, a game in which he recorded one assist. He finished his NHL career with 100 goals and 107 assists in 501 games.

McLlwain moved to Europe in 1997, playing for EV Landshut. He then played two seasons for SC Bern before joining Kölner Haie, where he ended his career in March 2009, after playing nine seasons with the club.

== Career statistics ==
=== Regular season and playoffs ===
			Regular season					Playoffs
Season	Team	League	GP	G	A	Pts	PIM	GP	G	A	Pts	PIM
1982–83	Seaforth Centenaires	OHA D	34	25	20	45	26	—	—	—	—	—
1983–84	Seaforth Centenaires	OHA D	33	42	36	78	30	—	—	—	—	—
1984–85	Kitchener Rangers	OHL	61	13	21	34	29	4	0	0	0	0
1984–85	Dixie Beehives	OJHL	1	1	1	2	0	—	—	—	—	—
1985–86	Kitchener Rangers	OHL	13	7	7	14	12	—	—	—	—	—
1985–86	North Bay Centennials	OHL	51	30	28	58	25	10	4	4	8	2
1986–87	North Bay Centennials	OHL	60	46	73	119	35	24	7	18	25	40
1987–88	Pittsburgh Penguins	NHL	66	11	8	19	40	—	—	—	—	—
1987–88	Muskegon Lumberjacks	IHL	9	4	6	10	23	6	2	3	5	8
1988–89	Pittsburgh Penguins	NHL	24	1	2	3	4	3	0	1	1	6
1988–89	Muskegon Lumberjacks	IHL	46	37	35	72	51	7	8	2	10	6
1989–90	Winnipeg Jets	NHL	80	25	26	51	60	7	0	1	1	2
1990–91	Winnipeg Jets	NHL	60	14	11	25	46	—	—	—	—	—
1991–92	Winnipeg Jets	NHL	3	1	1	2	2	—	—	—	—	—
1991–92	New York Islanders	NHL	54	8	15	23	28	—	—	—	—	—
1991–92	Buffalo Sabres	NHL	5	0	0	0	2	—	—	—	—	—
1991–92	Toronto Maple Leafs	NHL	11	1	2	3	4	—	—	—	—	—
1992–93	Toronto Maple Leafs	NHL	66	14	4	18	30	4	0	0	0	0
1993–94	Ottawa Senators	NHL	66	17	26	43	48	—	—	—	—	—
1994–95	Ottawa Senators	NHL	43	5	6	11	22	—	—	—	—	—
1995–96	Cleveland Lumberjacks	IHL	60	30	45	75	80	—	—	—	—	—
1995–96	Ottawa Senators	NHL	1	0	1	1	2	—	—	—	—	—
1995–96	Pittsburgh Penguins	NHL	18	2	4	6	4	6	0	0	0	0
1996–97	New York Islanders	NHL	4	1	1	2	0	—	—	—	—	—
1996–97	Cleveland Lumberjacks	IHL	63	29	46	75	85	14	8	15	23	6
1997–98	EV Landshut	DEL	47	21	13	34	34	—	—	—	—	—
1998–99	SC Bern	NDA	39	20	34	54	30	—	—	—	—	—
1999–00	SC Bern	NLA	45	16	33	49	51	5	1	1	2	6
2000–01	Kölner Haie	DEL	50	17	24	41	52	3	1	0	1	6
2001–02	Kölner Haie	DEL	52	12	28	40	58	—	—	—	—	—
2002–03	Kölner Haie	DEL	52	18	26	44	70	15	3	10	13	53
2003–04	Kölner Haie	DEL	47	23	29	52	126	2	1	2	3	2
2004–05	Kölner Haie	DEL	51	15	32	47	83	7	2	5	7	8
2005–06	Kölner Haie	DEL	51	14	50	64	111	9	3	9	12	22
2006–07	Kölner Haie	DEL	52	21	41	62	92	9	4	10	14	22
2007–08	Kölner Haie	DEL	53	19	35	54	73	13	1	8	9	26
2008–09	Kölner Haie	DEL	42	8	16	24	48	—	—	—	—	—
DEL totals			495	169	295	464	743	61	15	44	59	143
NHL totals			501	100	107	207	292	20	0	2	2	8

=== International ===
Year	Team	Event	Results	GP	G	A	Pts	PIM
1987	Canada	WJC	DQ	6	4	4	8	2
Junior totals				6	4	4	8	2

== Transactions ==
- June 17, 1989 - Traded from Pittsburgh Penguins with Randy Cunneyworth and Rick Tabaracci to Winnipeg Jets for Randy Gilhen, Jim Kyte and Andrew McBain.
- October 11, 1991 - Traded from Winnipeg Jets with Gord Donnelly and a fifth-round pick in the 1992 draft (Yuri Khmylev) to Buffalo Sabres for Mike Hartman, Dean Kennedy and Darrin Shannon.
- October 25, 1991 - Traded from Buffalo Sabres with Benoit Hogue, Uwe Krupp and Pierre Turgeon to New York Islanders for Randy Hillier, Pat LaFontaine and Randy Wood.
- March 10, 1992 - Traded from New York Islanders with Ken Baumgartner to Toronto Maple Leafs for Claude Loiselle and Daniel Marois
- October 3, 1993 - Claimed in the 1993 NHL Waiver Draft by the Ottawa Senators from the Toronto Maple Leafs.
- March 1, 1996 - Traded from Ottawa Senators to Pittsburgh Penguins for eighth-round pick (Erich Goldmann) in the 1996 draft.
- July 29, 1996 - Signed as a free agent by New York Islanders.
