= Steve Chiasson =

Canadian ice hockey player (1967–1999)

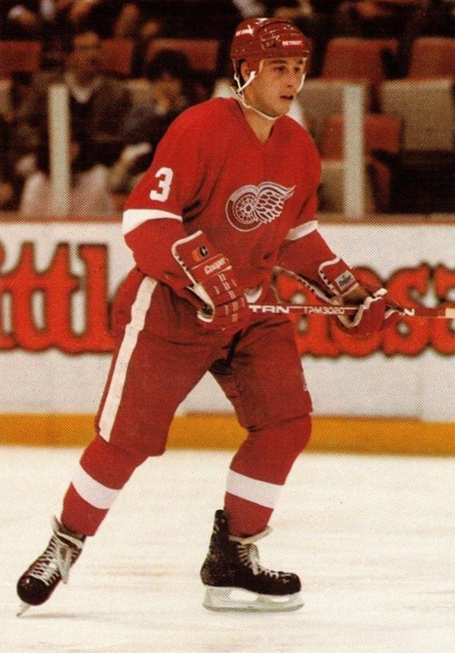
- Born: April 14, 1967 Barrie, Ontario, Canada
- Died: May 3, 1999 (aged 32) Raleigh, North Carolina, U.S.
- Height: 6 ft 1 in (185 cm)
- Weight: 205 lb (93 kg; 14 st 9 lb)
- Position: Defence
- Shot: Left
- Played for: Detroit Red Wings; Calgary Flames; Hartford Whalers; Carolina Hurricanes
- National team: Canada
- NHL draft: 50th overall, 1985; Detroit Red Wings
- Playing career: 1986–1999

Steven Joseph Chiasson (April 14, 1967 – May 3, 1999) was a Canadian ice hockey defenceman with the National Hockey League's Detroit Red Wings, Calgary Flames, Hartford Whalers and Carolina Hurricanes.

Chiasson died in an automobile accident, while driving under the influence, on May 3, 1999.

== NHL career ==
Chiasson was born in Barrie, Ontario, and raised in Peterborough, Ontario. As a youth, he played in the 1980 Quebec International Pee-Wee Hockey Tournament with a minor ice hockey team from Peterborough.

Drafted by the Detroit Red Wings in 1985, he was an offensive defenceman who displayed a lot of skill. During the 1992–93 NHL season Chiasson recorded a career-high 62 points and represented the Campbell Conference in the NHL All-Star Game. He was traded to the Calgary Flames in exchange for Mike Vernon in the 1994 off-season. Chiasson spent two and a half seasons with the Flames before being dealt to the Hartford Whalers in 1997 and continued with the team as they became the Carolina Hurricanes the following season. After spending most of the 1998–99 season on the injured list, Chiasson returned for the playoffs and scored a power play goal in Game 5 of their conference quarterfinal round with the Boston Bruins, which would end up being his last NHL goal.

Chiasson was also frequently a member of the Canadian national team, representing them in eight IIHF World Championships over the course of his career.

== Fatal accident ==
On May 3, 1999, after the Hurricanes were eliminated from the playoffs in Boston and returned to Raleigh, Chiasson crashed his pickup truck on the way home from a team party. Driving roughly 20 miles per hour (32 kilometers per hour) over the speed limit and not wearing a seatbelt, Chiasson was ejected from the vehicle after it rolled over and died instantly from his injuries. Chiasson was survived by his wife, Susan, and three young children: Michael, Ryan and Stephanie. There is a sculpture garden created in his honor with life-size bronze portraits of his children playing around a pond and a plaque in his memory in Millennium Park, Peterborough, Ontario, the town where he was raised. The Stanley Cup was brought to this spot on July 27, 2006, by former Flames teammate Cory Stillman, after Stillman won the Cup with the Hurricanes that season.

== Legacy ==
After his death, the Carolina Hurricanes established the Steve Chiasson Award to honor the player who "best demonstrates leadership, perseverance, determination and dedication."

No player has ever worn #3 for the Hurricanes again, though it has not been officially retired.

Chiasson's older son, Michael played defence for the University of Michigan men's hockey team and wore his late father's #3. Chiasson's other son, Ryan, also wore #3 for the Dubuque Fighting Saints of the USHL during the 2013–2014 season.

== Career statistics ==
=== Regular season and playoffs ===
			Regular season					Playoffs
Season	Team	League	GP	G	A	Pts	PIM	GP	G	A	Pts	PIM
1983–84	Guelph Platers	OHL	55	1	9	10	112	—	—	—	—	—
1984–85	Guelph Platers	OHL	61	8	22	30	139	—	—	—	—	—
1985–86	Guelph Platers	OHL	54	12	29	41	126	18	10	10	20	37
1986–87	Detroit Red Wings	NHL	45	1	4	5	73	2	0	0	0	19
1987–88	Adirondack Red Wings	AHL	23	6	11	17	58	—	—	—	—	—
1987–88	Detroit Red Wings	NHL	29	2	9	11	57	9	2	2	4	31
1988–89	Detroit Red Wings	NHL	65	12	35	47	149	5	2	1	3	6
1989–90	Detroit Red Wings	NHL	67	14	28	42	114	—	—	—	—	—
1990–91	Detroit Red Wings	NHL	42	3	17	20	80	5	3	1	4	19
1991–92	Detroit Red Wings	NHL	62	10	24	34	136	11	1	5	6	12
1992–93	Detroit Red Wings	NHL	79	12	50	62	155	7	2	2	4	19
1993–94	Detroit Red Wings	NHL	82	13	33	46	122	7	2	3	5	2
1994–95	Calgary Flames	NHL	45	2	23	25	39	7	1	2	3	9
1995–96	Calgary Flames	NHL	76	8	25	33	62	4	2	1	3	0
1996–97	Calgary Flames	NHL	47	5	11	16	32	—	—	—	—	—
1996–97	Hartford Whalers	NHL	18	3	11	14	7	—	—	—	—	—
1997–98	Carolina Hurricanes	NHL	66	7	27	34	65	—	—	—	—	—
1998–99	Carolina Hurricanes	NHL	28	1	8	9	16	6	1	1	2	2
NHL totals			751	93	305	398	1,107	63	16	18	34	119

=== International ===
Year	Team	Event	GP	G	A	Pts	PIM
1987	Canada	WJC	6	2	2	4	21
1997	Canada	WC	11	0	3	3	8

== See also ==
- List of ice hockey players who died during their playing career
