= Jimmy Waite =

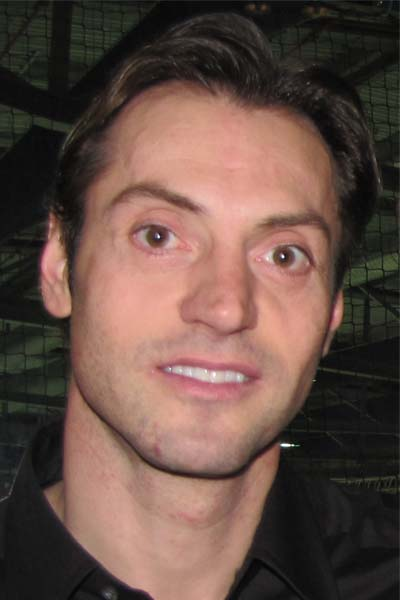
- Waite in 2009
- Born: April 15, 1969 (age 57) Sherbrooke, Quebec, Canada
- Height: 6 ft 1 in (185 cm)
- Weight: 180 lb (82 kg; 12 st 12 lb)
- Position: Goaltender
- Caught: Left
- Played for: Chicago Blackhawks; San Jose Sharks; Phoenix Coyotes; Moskitos Essen; Iserlohn Roosters; ERC Ingolstadt; Nürnberg Ice Tigers
- National team: Canada
- NHL draft: 8th overall, 1987; Chicago Blackhawks
- Playing career: 1988–2010

James Dean Waite (born April 15, 1969) is a Canadian professional ice hockey coach and former goaltender. He currently serves as the goaltending coach for the Chicago Blackhawks.

== Playing career ==
Waite was born in Sherbrooke, Quebec. As a youth, he played in the 1981 and 1982 Quebec International Pee-Wee Hockey Tournaments with a minor ice hockey team from Sherbrooke.

Waite was one of the highest-rated goalies in the late 1980s and many scouts believed he had the potential to become a star. He was named the best goaltender at the 1988 World Junior Ice Hockey Championships and was also named to the tournament all-star team as Canada won the gold medal. He was selected by the Chicago Blackhawks in the 1987 NHL entry draft; the Blackhawks were already deep in goal with both Ed Belfour and Dominik Hašek (although Hasek could not come to North America without defecting at the time). While Waite received the bulk of the starts in the backup role to Belfour for Chicago, with Hasek playing just 25 games in 2 seasons, Waite did not exhibit strong skills and was later sent to the San Jose Sharks, and eventually the Phoenix Coyotes. He was named NHL player of the week on November 16, 1998. After 2001, Waite played the rest of his career in Germany, playing six years for ERC Ingolstadt in the Deutsche Eishockey Liga and signed in January 2010 with the Nürnberg Ice Tigers.

== Personal life ==
Waite's brother, Stéphane, was the goaltending coach for the Montreal Canadiens. He previously served as the Blackhawks' goaltending coach from 2005 to 2009.

== Career statistics ==
=== Regular season and playoffs ===
			Regular season									Playoffs
Season	Team	League	GP	W	L	T	MIN	GA	SO	GAA	SV%	GP	W	L	MIN	GA	SO	GAA	SV%
1984–85	Cantons de l'Est Cantonniers	QMAAA	10	6	4	0	598	52	0	5.22	—	3	2	1	143	15	0	6.29	—
1985–86	Cantons de l'Est Cantonniers	QMAAA	27	11	15	1	1644	143	0	5.22	—	2	0	2	100	11	0	6.60	—
1986–87	Chicoutimi Saguenéens	QMJHL	50	23	17	3	2569	209	2	4.48	.869	11	4	6	576	54	1	5.63	.860
1987–88	Chicoutimi Saguenéens	QMJHL	36	17	16	1	2000	150	0	4.50	.875	4	1	2	222	17	0	4.59	.844
1988–89	Chicago Blackhawks	NHL	11	0	7	1	494	43	0	5.22	.829	—	—	—	—	—	—	—	—
1988–89	Saginaw Hawks	IHL	5	3	1	0	304	10	0	1.97	—	—	—	—	—	—	—	—	—
1989–90	Chicago Blackhawks	NHL	4	2	0	0	183	14	0	4.60	.848	—	—	—	—	—	—	—	—
1989–90	Indianapolis Ice	IHL	54	34	14	5	3207	135	5	2.53	—	10	9	1	602	19	1	1.89	—
1990–91	Chicago Blackhawks	NHL	1	1	0	0	60	2	0	2.00	.929	—	—	—	—	—	—	—	—
1990–91	Indianapolis Ice	IHL	49	26	18	4	2888	167	3	3.47	—	6	2	4	369	20	0	3.25	—
1991–92	Chicago Blackhawks	NHL	17	4	7	4	877	54	0	3.69	.844	—	—	—	—	—	—	—	—
1991–92	Indianapolis Ice	IHL	13	4	7	1	702	53	0	4.53	—	—	—	—	—	—	—	—	—
1991–92	Hershey Bears	AHL	11	6	4	1	631	44	0	4.18	.876	6	2	4	360	19	0	3.17	.912
1992–93	Chicago Blackhawks	NHL	20	6	7	1	996	49	2	2.95	.881	—	—	—	—	—	—	—	—
1993–94	San Jose Sharks	NHL	15	3	7	0	697	50	0	4.30	.843	—	—	—	—	—	—	—	—
1994–95	Indianapolis Ice	IHL	4	2	1	1	239	13	0	3.25	.909	—	—	—	—	—	—	—	—
1994–95	Chicago Blackhawks	NHL	2	1	1	0	119	5	0	2.53	.902	—	—	—	—	—	—	—	—
1995–96	Chicago Blackhawks	NHL	1	0	0	0	31	0	0	0.00	1.000	—	—	—	—	—	—	—	—
1995–96	Indianapolis Ice	IHL	56	28	18	6	3157	179	0	3.40	.894	5	2	3	298	15	1	3.02	.909
1996–97	Chicago Blackhawks	NHL	2	0	1	1	105	7	0	4.00	.879	—	—	—	—	—	—	—	—
1996–97	Indianapolis Ice	IHL	41	22	15	4	2450	112	4	2.74	.914	4	1	3	222	13	0	3.51	.919
1997–98	Phoenix Coyotes	NHL	17	5	6	1	793	28	1	2.12	.913	4	0	3	171	11	0	3.85	.887
1998–99	Phoenix Coyotes	NHL	16	6	5	4	898	41	1	2.74	.895	—	—	—	—	—	—	—	—
1998–99	Utah Grizzlies	IHL	11	6	3	2	622	30	0	2.89	.906	—	—	—	—	—	—	—	—
1998–99	Springfield Falcons	AHL	8	3	4	1	483	19	0	2.36	.914	2	0	2	118	6	0	3.05	.912
1999–2000	St. John's Maple Leafs	AHL	62	20	37	4	3461	176	6	3.05	.912	—	—	—	—	—	—	—	—
2000–01	St. John's Maple Leafs	AHL	43	12	25	4	2445	132	1	3.24	.899	—	—	—	—	—	—	—	—
2001–02	Moskitos Essen	DEL	58	—	—	—	3290	166	3	3.03	.908	—	—	—	—	—	—	—	—
2002–03	Iserlohn Roosters	DEL	52	—	—	—	3081	122	6	2.38	.909	—	—	—	—	—	—	—	—
2003–04	ERC Ingolstadt	DEL	49	—	—	—	2794	93	8	2.00	.926	9	—	—	579	27	1	2.80	.912
2004–05	ERC Ingolstadt	DEL	42	—	—	—	2454	92	8	2.25	.921	11	—	—	661	29	1	2.63	.916
2005–06	ERC Ingolstadt	DEL	50	—	—	—	2935	108	5	2.21	.923	7	—	—	395	17	1	2.58	.913
2006–07	ERC Ingolstadt	DEL	47	—	—	—	2772	120	2	2.60	.915	6	—	—	376	21	0	3.35	.915
2007–08	ERC Ingolstadt	DEL	51	—	—	—	3006	156	3	3.11	.900	3	—	—	—	—	—	4.00	.865
2008–09	ERC Ingolstadt	DEL	48	—	—	—	2875	133	1	2.78	.910	—	—	—	—	—	—	—	—
2009–10	Nürnberg Ice Tigers	DEL	1	—	—	—	60	2	0	2.00	.959	1	—	—	—	—	—	2.00	.939
IHL totals			233	125	77	23	13,569	699	12	3.09	—	25	14	11	1491	67	2	4.04	—
DEL totals			398	—	—	—	23,267	992	36	2.56	—	37	—	—	—	—	—	—	—
NHL totals			106	28	41	12	5253	293	4	3.35	.871	4	0	3	171	11	0	3.85	.887

=== International ===
Year	Team	Event	GP	W	L	T	MIN	GA	SO	GAA
1987	Canada	WJC	4				220	12	0	3.27
1988	Canada	WJC	7	6	0	1	419	16	0	2.29
Junior totals			11	—	—	—	639	28	0	2.63

Awards and achievements
Preceded by Everett Sanipass	Chicago Blackhawks first-round draft pick 1987	Succeeded by Jeremy Roenick
