= Pat Elynuik =

Canadian ice hockey player (born 1967)

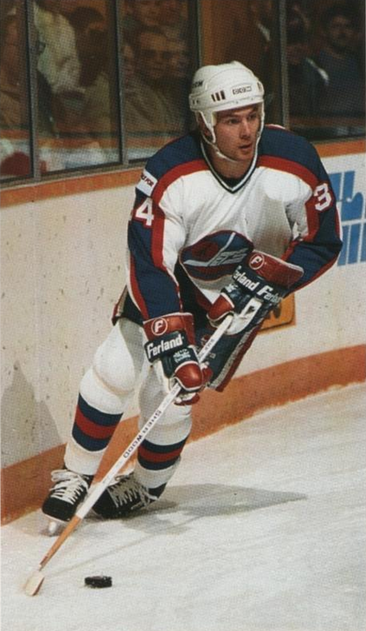
- Elynuik in 1988 photo
- Born: October 30, 1967 (age 58) Foam Lake, Saskatchewan, Canada
- Height: 6 ft 1 in (185 cm)
- Weight: 185 lb (84 kg; 13 st 3 lb)
- Position: Right wing
- Shot: Right
- Played for: Winnipeg Jets; Washington Capitals; Tampa Bay Lightning; Ottawa Senators
- NHL draft: 8th overall, 1986; Winnipeg Jets
- Playing career: 1987–1997

Patrick Gerald Elynuik (born October 30, 1967) is a Canadian former professional ice hockey player who played 506 games in the National Hockey League. After winning a Memorial Cup as a member of the Prince Albert Raiders in 1985, he was drafted in the first round of the 1986 NHL entry draft, 8th overall by the Winnipeg Jets. He also played his career for the Washington Capitals, Tampa Bay Lightning and Ottawa Senators. He retired in 1997.

== Personal life ==
Elynuik had three sons, Hudson, Campbell, and Jakson, who all played hockey. Hudson was drafted by the Carolina Hurricanes in the 2016 NHL entry draft.

== Career statistics ==
=== Regular season and playoffs ===
			Regular season					Playoffs
Season	Team	League	GP	G	A	Pts	PIM	GP	G	A	Pts	PIM
1982–83	Prince Albert Raiders	WHL	3	0	1	1	0	—	—	—	—	—
1983–84	Prince Albert Raiders AAA	SMHL	26	33	30	63	64	—	—	—	—	—
1983–84	Prince Albert Raiders	WHL	2	1	0	1	0	—	—	—	—	—
1984–85	Prince Albert Raiders	WHL	70	23	20	43	54	13	9	3	12	7
1984–85	Prince Albert Raiders	MC	—	—	—	—	—	5	1	0	1	12
1985–86	Prince Albert Raiders	WHL	68	53	53	106	62	20	7	9	16	17
1986–87	Prince Albert Raiders	WHL	64	51	62	113	40	8	5	5	10	12
1987–88	Moncton Hawks	AHL	30	11	18	29	35	—	—	—	—	—
1987–88	Winnipeg Jets	NHL	13	1	3	4	12	—	—	—	—	—
1988–89	Moncton Hawks	AHL	7	8	2	10	2	—	—	—	—	—
1988–89	Winnipeg Jets	NHL	56	26	25	51	29	—	—	—	—	—
1989–90	Winnipeg Jets	NHL	80	32	42	74	83	7	2	4	6	2
1990–91	Winnipeg Jets	NHL	80	31	34	65	73	—	—	—	—	—
1991–92	Winnipeg Jets	NHL	60	25	25	50	65	7	2	2	4	4
1992–93	Washington Capitals	NHL	80	22	35	57	66	6	2	3	5	19
1993–94	Washington Capitals	NHL	4	1	1	2	0	—	—	—	—	—
1993–94	Tampa Bay Lightning	NHL	63	12	14	26	64	—	—	—	—	—
1994–95	Ottawa Senators	NHL	41	3	7	10	51	—	—	—	—	—
1995–96	Fort Wayne Komets	IHL	42	22	28	50	43	—	—	—	—	—
1995–96	Ottawa Senators	NHL	29	1	2	3	16	—	—	—	—	—
1996–97	Michigan K-Wings	IHL	81	24	34	58	62	4	1	0	1	0
NHL totals			506	154	188	342	459	20	6	9	15	25

=== International ===
Year	Team	Event	GP	G	A	Pts	PIM
1987	Canada	WJC	6	6	5	11	2

== Awards ==
- WHL East First All-Star Team – 1986 & 1987

Preceded by Ryan Stewart	Winnipeg Jets first-round draft pick 1986	Succeeded by Bryan Marchment
