= Scott Metcalfe =

Canadian ice hockey player (1967–2025)

- Born: January 6, 1967 Toronto, Ontario, Canada
- Died: June 5, 2025 (aged 58) Rochester, New York, U.S.
- Height: 6 ft 0 in (183 cm)
- Weight: 200 lb (91 kg; 14 st 4 lb)
- Position: Centre
- Shot: Left
- Played for: Edmonton Oilers; Buffalo Sabres; Eisbären Berlin; Hannover Scorpions; Sheffield Steelers
- NHL draft: 20th overall, 1985; Edmonton Oilers
- Playing career: 1987–2002

Scott "Metter" Metcalfe (January 6, 1967 – June 5, 2025) was a Canadian professional ice hockey player, who played 19 games over four seasons in the National Hockey League (NHL). The majority of his career was spent with the Rochester Americans of the American Hockey League, where he helped the team to a Calder Cup Championship in 1996 and over the course of nine seasons became a fan favorite.

== Playing career ==
Metcalfe was born in Toronto, Ontario. He began his junior career playing with the Kingston Canadians of the Ontario Hockey League (OHL) from 1983 to 1986, playing in 192 games, scoring 213 points (88 goals and 125 assists), and adding three goals and six assists in 10 playoff games. While with Kingston, Metcalfe was drafted by the Edmonton Oilers with their first pick, 20th overall in the 1985 NHL entry draft.

He played for Team Canada at the 1987 World Junior Ice Hockey Championships, scoring seven points (two goals, five assists) in six games.

Metcalfe began the 1987–88 season with the Nova Scotia Oilers of the American Hockey League (AHL), before making his NHL debut on January 4, 1988 in a tie with the Boston Bruins. The Oilers shipped him to along with the a ninth-round draft pick in the 1989 NHL entry draft, to the Buffalo Sabres for Steve Dykstra and the Sabres' seventh-round pick in the 1989 NHL Draft, on February 11, 1988. Metcalfe spent the majority of the remainder of the season with the Rochester Americans of the AHL, scoring 15 points (two goals and 13 assists) in 22 game. He played a single game with the Sabres in the NHL, picking up his first NHL point, an assist. He chipped in with four points (one goal and three assists) in seven playoff games with Rochester.

Metcalfe spent most of the 1988–89 season with Rochester, picking up 51 points (20 goals and 31 assists) in 60 games, along with 241 penalty minutes. He played nine games in Buffalo, scoring his first NHL goal and picking up as assist, as well. He once again split his playing time between Rochester and Buffalo in 1989–90, scoring 29 points (12 goals and 17 assists) in 43 games in Rochester, and no points in seven games with the Sabres, his last time in the NHL. Metcalfe recorded an assist in two playoff games with Rochester. He spent the entire 1990–91 season with the Americans, scoring 39 points (17 goals and 22 assists) in 69 games, and had five points (four goals and one assist) in 14 post-season games.

Metcalfe spent the next two seasons in Germany playing for EHC Dynamo Berlin, ES Weißwasser, and Eisbären Berlin. He returned to North America in 1993–94, scoring a career-high 81 points for the Knoxville Cherokees of the ECHL, while also skating 16 games with the Americans.

Metcalfe played exclusively for the Americans the next three seasons, which were highlighted by the team's championship in 1996. During the playoffs that season Metcalfe contributed 14 points (six goals and eight assists) in 19 games. He competed for Rochester at the 1996 Spengler Cup.

Metcalfe returned to Germany for the 1998–99 and 1999-2000 season, playing for the Hannover Scorpions of the Deutsche Eishockey Liga (DEL). He then joined the Sheffield Steelers of the Ice Hockey Superleague in Great Britain for 2000-01 and finished his career with three games for the Adirondack IceHawks of the United Hockey League in 2000-01.

Metcalfe holds the Rochester record for penalty minutes with 1,424 over 499 career games with the Americans. As of the 2024-25 season, Metcalfe ranks seventh in games played, ninth in points and assists and 11th in goals for the franchise. He won numerous team awards during his years in Rochester, including the McCulloch Trophy for community service, the V.P. Supply Most Popular Player and Executive Club Most Popular Player award three times each. In 1988-89 he won the Rob Zabelny Award as the team’s Unsung Hero.

In 2006, Metcalfe was inducted into the Amerks Hall of Fame.

== Personal life and death ==
Metcalfe was married to Jane and had three children. Following his career, Metcalfe remained in Rochester.

Metcalfe died on June 5, 2025, at the age of 58.

== Career statistics ==
=== Regular season and playoffs ===
			Regular season					Playoffs
Season	Team	League	GP	G	A	Pts	PIM	GP	G	A	Pts	PIM
1983–84	Kingston Canadians	OHL	68	25	49	74	154	—	—	—	—	—
1984–85	Kingston Canadians	OHL	58	27	33	60	100	—	—	—	—	—
1985–86	Kingston Canadians	OHL	66	36	43	79	213	10	3	6	9	21
1986–87	Kingston Canadians	OHL	39	15	45	60	104	—	—	—	—	—
1986–87	Windsor Compuware Spitfires	OHL	18	10	12	22	52	13	5	10	27
1987–88	Edmonton Oilers	NHL	2	0	0	0	0	—	—	—	—	—
1987–88	Nova Scotia Oilers	AHL	43	9	19	28	87	—	—	—	—	—
1987–88	Buffalo Sabres	NHL	1	0	1	1	0	—	—	—	—	—
1987–88	Rochester Americans	AHL	22	2	13	15	56	7	1	3	4	24
1988–89	Buffalo Sabres	NHL	9	1	1	2	13	—	—	—	—	—
1988–89	Rochester Americans	AHL	60	20	31	51	241	—	—	—	—	—
1989–90	Buffalo Sabres	NHL	7	0	0	0	5	—	—	—	—	—
1989–90	Rochester Americans	AHL	43	12	17	29	93	2	0	1	1	0
1990–91	Rochester Americans	AHL	69	17	22	39	177	14	4	1	5	27
1991–92	EHC Dynamo Berlin	GER-2	25	19	16	35	83	—	—	—	—	—
1992–93	Eisbären Berlin	GER	27	8	17	25	45	4	2	2	4	8
1992–93	ES Weißwasser	GER-2	8	4	3	7	4	—	—	—	—	—
1993–94	Knoxville Cherokees	ECHL	56	25	56	81	136	3	0	1	1	20
1993–94	Rochester Americans	AHL	16	5	7	12	16	4	1	0	1	31
1994–95	Rochester Americans	AHL	63	19	36	55	216	5	1	1	2	4
1995–96	Rochester Americans	AHL	71	21	24	45	228	19	6	8	14	23
1996–97	Rochester Americans	AHL	80	32	38	70	205	10	1	3	4	18
1997–98	Rochester Americans	AHL	75	9	24	33	192	4	0	0	0	0
1998–99	Hannover Scorpions	DEL	50	11	21	32	126	—	—	—	—	—
1999–00	Hannover Scorpions	DEL	49	8	12	20	69	—	—	—	—	—
2000–01	Sheffield Steelers	GBR	46	8	14	22	91	7	0	2	2	4
2001–02	Adirondack IceHawks	UHL	3	0	0	0	0	—	—	—	—	—
AHL totals			542	146	231	377	1511	65	14	17	31	127
NHL totals			19	1	2	3	18	—	—	—	—	—

=== International ===
Year	Team	Event	GP	G	A	Pts	PIM
1987	Canada	WJC	6	2	5	7	12
Junior totals			6	2	5	7	12

Preceded by Selmar Odelein	Edmonton Oilers first-round draft pick 1985	Succeeded by Kim Issel
