= David Latta (ice hockey) =

Canadian ice hockey player (born 1967)

- Born: January 3, 1967 (age 59) Thunder Bay, Ontario, Canada
- Height: 6 ft 1 in (185 cm)
- Weight: 190 lb (86 kg; 13 st 8 lb)
- Position: Left wing
- Shot: Left
- Played for: Quebec Nordiques
- NHL draft: 15th overall, 1985; Quebec Nordiques
- Playing career: 1986–1998

David Latta (born January 3, 1967, in Thunder Bay, Ontario) is a former professional ice hockey left winger. He was drafted in the first round, 15th overall, by the Quebec Nordiques in the 1985 NHL entry draft. He played thirty-six games in the National Hockey League, all with the Nordiques.

== Career statistics ==
=== Regular season and playoffs ===
			Regular season					Playoffs
Season	Team	League	GP	G	A	Pts	PIM	GP	G	A	Pts	PIM
1982–83	Orillia Travelways	OPJHL	43	16	25	41	26	—	—	—	—	—
1983–84	Kitchener Rangers	OHL	66	17	26	43	54	16	3	6	9	9
1984–85	Kitchener Rangers	OHL	52	38	27	65	26	4	2	4	6	4
1985–86	Quebec Nordiques	NHL	1	0	0	0	0	—	—	—	—	—
1985–86	Kitchener Rangers	OHL	55	36	34	70	60	5	7	1	8	15
1985–86	Fredericton Express	AHL	3	1	0	1	0	5	0	3	3	0
1986–87	Kitchener Rangers	OHL	50	32	46	78	46	4	0	3	3	2
1987–88	Quebec Nordiques	NHL	10	0	0	0	0	—	—	—	—	—
1987–88	Fredericton Express	AHL	34	11	21	32	28	15	9	4	13	24
1988–89	Quebec Nordiques	NHL	24	4	8	12	4	—	—	—	—	—
1988–89	Halifax Citadels	AHL	42	20	26	46	36	4	0	2	2	0
1989–90	Halifax Citadels	AHL	34	11	5	16	45	—	—	—	—	—
1990–91	Canada	Intl	30	5	14	19	24	—	—	—	—	—
1990–91	Quebec Nordiques	NHL	1	0	0	0	0	—	—	—	—	—
1990–91	Halifax Citadels	AHL	22	4	7	11	12	—	—	—	—	—
1991–92	New Haven Nighthawks	AHL	76	18	27	45	100	5	1	1	2	4
1992–93	EC Bad Nauheim	DEU.2	9	8	8	16	0	—	—	—	—	—
1992–93	Cincinnati Cyclones	IHL	13	4	7	11	26	—	—	—	—	—
1993–94	EC Bad Tölz	DEU.3	29	33	31	64	26	25	30	34	64	30
1994–95	Adler Mannheim	DEL	2	1	1	2	2	—	—	—	—	—
1994–95	EHC Zweibrücken	DEU.3	24	31	79	110	157	—	—	—	—	—
1995–96	EC Bad Tölz	DEU.2	33	14	26	40	36	—	—	—	—	—
1995–96	Adler Mannheim	DEL	1	1	0	1	0	—	—	—	—	—
1995–96	EHC Zweibrücken	DEU.3	2	2	3	5	2	—	—	—	—	—
1996–97	EC Peiting	DEU.2	10	2	4	6	8	—	—	—	—	—
1996–97	Manchester Storm	GBR	21	1	3	4	10	6	0	0	0	0
1997–98	Anchorage Aces	WCHL	48	10	13	23	64	5	0	0	0	2
NHL totals			36	4	8	12	4	—	—	—	—	—
AHL totals			211	65	86	151	221	29	10	10	20	28

=== International ===
Year	Team	Event	GP	G	A	Pts	PIM
1987	Canada	WJC	6	4	6	10	12

Preceded by Trevor Stienburg	Quebec Nordiques first-round draft pick 1985	Succeeded by Ken McRae
