= Stéphane Roy (ice hockey, born 1967) =

Canadian ice hockey player

- Born: June 29, 1967 (age 58) Quebec City, Quebec, Canada
- Height: 6 ft 0 in (183 cm)
- Weight: 205 lb (93 kg; 14 st 9 lb)
- Position: Centre
- Shot: Left
- Played for: Minnesota North Stars
- National team: Canada
- NHL draft: 51st overall, 1985; Minnesota North Stars
- Playing career: 1987–2003

Stéphane Roy (born June 29, 1967) is a Canadian former professional ice hockey player who played 12 games in the National Hockey League (NHL) with the Minnesota North Stars during the 1987–88 season. The rest of his career, which lasted from 1987 to 2003, was spent in various minor leagues.

== Early life ==
Roy was born in Quebec City, Quebec, and raised in Cap-Rouge, Quebec. As a youth, he played in the 1978, 1979 and 1980 Quebec International Pee-Wee Hockey Tournaments with a minor ice hockey team from Quebec City and was a teammate to his brother Patrick in the 1978 event.

== Career ==
Roy was drafted by the Minnesota North Stars in 1985, in the third round (51st overall). He played with the North Stars in the 1987–88 season, scoring one goal in twelve games and accumulating zero penalty minutes. He also spent several stints with the Canadian National Team during the first half of his career, making the team five times in a seven-year span (1986–93).

== Personal life ==
Roy is the younger brother of Hockey Hall of Fame goaltender Patrick Roy.

== Career statistics ==
=== Regular season and playoffs ===
			Regular season					Playoffs
Season	Team	League	GP	G	A	Pts	PIM	GP	G	A	Pts	PIM
1982–83	Sainte-Foy Gouverneurs	QMAAA	43	21	39	60	42	5	3	1	4	6
1983–84	Chicoutimi Saguenéens	QMJHL	67	12	26	38	25	—	—	—	—	—
1984–85	Chicoutimi Saguenéens	QMJHL	41	21	27	48	18	—	—	—	—	—
1984–85	Granby Bisons	QMJHL	27	7	26	33	18	—	—	—	—	—
1985–86	Granby Bisons	QMJHL	61	33	52	85	68	—	—	—	—	—
1985–86	Canadian National Team	Intl	10	0	1	1	4	—	—	—	—	—
1986–87	Granby Bisons	QMJHL	45	23	44	67	54	7	2	3	5	50
1986–87	Canadian National Team	Intl	9	1	2	3	4	—	—	—	—	—
1987–88	Minnesota North Stars	NHL	12	1	0	1	0	—	—	—	—	—
1987–88	Kalamazoo Wings	IHL	58	21	12	33	52	5	1	2	3	11
1988–89	Kalamazoo Wings	IHL	20	5	4	9	27	—	—	—	—	—
1988–89	Halifax Citadels	AHL	42	8	16	24	28	1	0	0	0	0
1989–90	Nice hockey Côte d'Azur	FRA-3	12	15	8	23	38	—	—	—	—	—
1990–91	Canadian National Team	Intl	52	22	22	44	6	—	—	—	—	—
1991–92	HC Neuchâtel Young Sprinters	NLB	6	2	1	3	2	—	—	—	—	—
1991–92	Canadian National Team	Intl	49	10	24	34	15	—	—	—	—	—
1992–93	Canadian National Team	Intl	55	12	31	43	38	—	—	—	—	—
1993–94	EHC Olten	NLA	3	1	2	3	2	—	—	—	—	—
1994–95	EHC Olten	NLB	—	—	—	—	—	—	—	—	—	—
1995–96	Memphis RiverKings	CHL	60	18	44	62	33	6	1	2	3	8
1996–97	Memphis RiverKings	CHL	38	16	28	44	25	—	—	—	—	—
1996–97	Anchorage Aces	WCHL	22	3	12	15	27	2	1	2	3	0
1997–98	Quebec Aces	QSPHL	8	2	5	7	6	—	—	—	—	—
1997–98	Macon Whoopee	CHL	4	1	6	7	8	3	1	0	1	10
1998–99	Abilene Aviators	WPHL	29	9	18	27	13	—	—	—	—	—
1999–00	La Pocatière Seigneurs	QCSHL	36	13	23	36	22	3	0	0	0	2
2000–01	Pont-Rouge Grand Portneuf	QSPHL	39	6	10	16	13	—	—	—	—	—
2001–02	Rivière-du-Loup Promutuel	QSPHL	8	1	4	5	2	—	—	—	—	—
2002–03	Lévis Canonniers	QCSHL	5	0	1	1	2	—	—	—	—	—
CHL totals			102	35	78	113	66	9	2	2	4	18
NHL totals			12	1	0	1	0	—	—	—	—	—

=== International ===
Year	Team	Event	GP	G	A	Pts	PIM
1987	Canada	WJC	6	0	1	1	6
Junior totals			6	0	1	1	6
