= 1988 World Junior Ice Hockey Championships =

1988 IIHF World U20 Championship

Tournament details
- Host country: Soviet Union
- Venue(s): 1 (in 1 host city)
- Dates: December 26, 1987 – January 4, 1988
- Teams: 8

Final positions
- Champions: Canada (3rd title)
- Runner-up: Soviet Union
- Third place: Finland
- Fourth place: Czechoslovakia

Tournament statistics
- Games played: 28
- Goals scored: 247 (8.82 per game)
- Attendance: 46,220 (1,651 per game)
- Scoring leader(s): (Soviet Union) Alexander Mogilny (18 points)

The 1988 World Junior Ice Hockey Championships was the 12th edition of the Ice Hockey World Junior Championship and was held in Moscow, Soviet Union. Canada and the Soviet Union won the gold and silver medals respectively as the two nations redeemed themselves following their mutual disqualification in the 1987 tournament as a result of the Punch-up in Piestany. Finland won the bronze medal.

== Final standings ==
The 1988 tournament was a round-robin format, with the top three teams winning gold, silver and bronze medals respectively.

Pos	Team	Pld	W	L	D	GF	GA	GD	Pts
1	Canada	7	6	0	1	37	16	+21	13
2	Soviet Union	7	6	1	0	44	18	+26	12
3	Finland	7	5	1	1	36	20	+16	11
4	Czechoslovakia	7	3	3	1	36	23	+13	7
5	Sweden	7	3	3	1	36	24	+12	7
6	United States	7	1	6	0	28	46	−18	2
7	West Germany	7	1	6	0	18	47	−29	2
8	Poland	7	1	6	0	12	53	−41	2

Source: Hockey Canada

Poland was relegated to Pool B for 1989.

== Results ==
December 26, 1987	Canada	4 – 2	Sweden

December 26, 1987	Soviet Union	6 – 4	Czechoslovakia

December 26, 1987	Finland	6 – 0	West Germany

December 26, 1987	Poland	4 – 3	United States

December 28, 1987	Canada	4 – 2	Czechoslovakia

December 28, 1987	Sweden	13 – 0	Poland

December 28, 1987	Soviet Union	6 – 2	Finland

December 28, 1987	United States	6 – 4	West Germany

December 29, 1987	Finland	4 – 4	Canada

December 29, 1987	Sweden	5 – 1	West Germany

December 29, 1987	Czechoslovakia	6 – 1	Poland

December 29, 1987	Soviet Union	7 – 3	United States

December 31, 1987	Canada	5 – 4	United States

December 31, 1987	Czechoslovakia	7 – 4	West Germany

December 31, 1987	Soviet Union	4 – 2	Sweden

December 31, 1987	Finland	9 – 1	Poland

January 1, 1988	Canada	3 – 2	Soviet Union

January 1, 1988	West Germany	6 – 3	Poland

January 1, 1988	Czechoslovakia	5 – 5	Sweden

January 1, 1988	Finland	8 – 6	United States

January 3, 1988	Canada	8 – 1	West Germany

January 3, 1988	Finland	5 – 2	Sweden

January 3, 1988	Soviet Union	7 – 2	Poland

January 3, 1988	Czechoslovakia	11 – 1	United States

January 4, 1988	Canada	9 – 1	Poland

January 4, 1988	Soviet Union	12 – 2	West Germany

January 4, 1988	Finland	2 – 1	Czechoslovakia

January 4, 1988	Sweden	7 – 5	United States

=== Scoring leaders ===
Rank	Player	Country	G	A	Pts
1	Alexander Mogilny	Soviet Union	9	9	18
2	Thomas Sjögren	Sweden	6	9	15
3	Ola Rosander	Sweden	9	5	14
3	Sergei Fedorov	Soviet Union	6	6	12
5	Janne Ojanen	Finland	6	5	11
6	Robert Reichel	Czechoslovakia	3	8	11
6	Tero Toivola	Finland	3	8	11
8	Jeremy Roenick	United States	5	4	9
9	Petr Pavlas	Czechoslovakia	4	5	9
10	Greg Hawgood	Canada	1	8	9

=== Tournament awards ===
	IIHF Directorate Awards	Media All-Star Team
Goaltender	(Canada) Jimmy Waite	(Canada) Jimmy Waite
Defencemen	(Finland) Teppo Numminen	(Canada) Greg Hawgood (Finland) Teppo Numminen
Forwards	(Soviet Union) Alexander Mogilny	(Soviet Union) Alexander Mogilny (Canada) Theoren Fleury (Czechoslovakia) Petr Hrbek

== Pool B ==
Eight teams contested the second tier this year in Sapporo Japan from March 12 to 21. It was played in a simple round robin format, each team playing seven games.

Standings

Pos	Team	Pld	W	L	D	GF	GA	GD	Pts	Norway men's national junior ice hockey team	Romania men's national junior ice hockey team	Switzerland men's national junior ice hockey team	Japan men's national junior ice hockey team	France men's national junior ice hockey team	Yugoslavia men's national junior ice hockey team	Netherlands men's national junior ice hockey team	Austria men's national junior ice hockey team
1	Norway	7	5	2	0	38	18	+20	10		8–0	3–2	3–4	8–2	6–7	5–1	5–2
2	Romania	7	5	2	0	24	27	−3	10	0–8		4–2	3–2	3–6	5–4	3–1	6–4
3	Switzerland	7	4	2	1	34	23	+11	9	2–3	2–4		1–1	6–5	6–5	9–2	8–3
4	Japan	7	3	2	2	34	27	+7	8	4–3	2–3	1–1		7–1	6–8	4–4	10–7
5	France	7	4	3	0	31	36	−5	8	2–8	6–3	5–6	1–7		7–6	7–5	3–1
6	Yugoslavia	7	3	3	1	37	36	+1	7	7–6	4–5	5–6	8–6	6–7		2–2	5–4
7	Netherlands	7	0	4	3	20	35	−15	3	1–5	1–3	2–9	4–4	5–7	2–2		5–5
8	Austria	7	0	6	1	26	42	−16	1	2–5	4–6	3–8	7–10	1–3	4–5	5–5	

Norway was promoted to Pool A and Austria was relegated to Pool C for 1989.

== Pool C ==
Eight teams contested the third tier this year in Belluno and Feltre, Italy from March 18 to 27. It was played in a simple round robin format, each team playing seven games. The North Korean juniors debuted this year.

Standings

Pos	Team	Pld	W	L	D	GF	GA	GD	Pts	Denmark men's national junior ice hockey team	Italy men's national junior ice hockey team	Bulgaria men's national junior ice hockey team	Great Britain men's national junior ice hockey team	Spain men's national junior ice hockey team	Hungary men's national junior ice hockey team	North Korea men's national junior ice hockey team	Belgium men's national junior ice hockey team
1	Denmark	7	7	0	0	59	11	+48	14		6–2	3–2	9–2	19–0	4–2	5–3	13–0
2	Italy	7	6	1	0	27	17	+10	12	2–6		4–1	6–4	4–2	3–2	3–2	5–0
3	Bulgaria	7	5	2	0	39	16	+23	10	2–3	1–4		7–3	8–1	10–0	8–4	3–1
4	Great Britain	7	3	3	1	21	27	−6	7	2–9	4–6	3–7		4–1	3–1	2–2	3–1
5	Spain	7	2	4	1	19	45	−26	5	0–19	2–4	1–8	1–4		6–2	5–5	4–3
6	Hungary	7	2	5	0	14	28	−14	4	2–4	2–3	0–10	1–3	2–6		4–1	3–1
7	North Korea	7	1	4	2	20	29	−9	4	3–5	2–3	4–8	2–2	5–5	1–4		3–2
8	Belgium	7	0	7	0	8	34	−26	0	0–13	0–5	1–3	1–3	3–4	1–3	2–3	

Denmark was initially promoted to Pool B for 1989, however because they used an ineligible player, a challenge series with Italy was played the following December to determine promotion.
