= 1987 World Junior Ice Hockey Championships =

Under-20s tournament in Czechoslovakia

1987 IIHF World U20 Championship

Tournament details
- Host country: Czechoslovakia
- Venues: 4 (in 4 host cities)
- Dates: December 26, 1986 – January 4, 1987
- Teams: 8

Final positions
- Champions: Finland (1st title)
- Runners-up: Czechoslovakia
- Third place: Sweden
- Fourth place: United States

Tournament statistics
- Games played: 27
- Goals scored: 272 (10.07 per game)
- Scoring leader: (Sweden) Ulf Dahlén (15 points)

The 1987 World Junior Ice Hockey Championships (1987 WJHC) was the 11th edition of the Ice Hockey World Junior Championship and was held in Piešťany, Trenčín, Nitra, and Topoľčany, Czechoslovakia. Finland captured its first World Junior gold medal, Czechoslovakia took silver, and Sweden the bronze. The tournament is most remembered, however, for how the medals were allocated.

== Punch-up in Piestany ==
With 6:07 left in the second period of the final game of the tournament between Canada and the Soviet Union, Pavel Kostichkin took a two-handed slash at Theoren Fleury, sparking a fight between the two; the USSR's Evgeny Davydov left the bench to assist Valeri Zelepukin in a fight, who was already playing the game with a separated shoulder, and was being pummeled by Canadian forward Mike Keane. Davydov's intervention sparked one of the most infamous bench-clearing brawls in international hockey history.

The officials, unable to break up the brawl, walked off the ice and tournament officials eventually tried shutting off the arena lights, but the brawl lasted for 20 minutes before the International Ice Hockey Federation declared the contest null and void. An emergency meeting was held following the brawl that ended with the delegates voting 7–1 to eject both teams from the tournament, with the sole dissenter being Canadian Dennis McDonald. The Canadian team, disgusted at what they perceived to be a conspiracy against them, chose to leave rather than stay for the end-of-tournament dinner, from which the Soviet team were banned.

While the Soviets were out of medal contention, Canada was playing for the gold medal, and were leading 4–2 at the time of the brawl (they needed to win by at least five goals to claim the gold). Even had they lost the game, they were assured at least the bronze medal. Afterwards, Soviet hockey official Anatoly Kastriukov claimed that the hostilities were fueled by a Canadian trainer who he alleged had punched one of the Soviet assistant coaches in the stomach. Some Canadians maintained that the Soviets had started the brawl by leaving their bench first, and had deliberately done so with the intention of getting Canada ejected. Alan Eagleson suggested that the IIHF's decision would have been different had it been the Soviets in contention for a medal, and not the Canadians. Soviet administrator Yuri Korolev expressed regret that the incident occurred but did not admit any guilt. He felt that the game should have been finished instead of both teams being disqualified from the tournament.

The ejections of the Canadian and Soviet teams had the retroactive effect of making the Finland-Czechoslovakia game (played earlier the same day) the gold medal game, while the Sweden-United States game became the bronze medal contest, and the Poland-Switzerland game determined who placed fifth. The loser of the latter game (Switzerland) was relegated, just as they were had the brawl not occurred. Poland avoided relegation despite giving up 80 goals in 7 games.

== Final standings ==
Pos	Team	Pld	W	L	D	GF	GA	GD	Pts
1	Finland	7	5	1	1	45	23	+22	11
2	Czechoslovakia	7	5	2	0	36	23	+13	10
3	Sweden	7	4	2	1	45	11	+34	9
4	United States	7	4	3	0	42	30	+12	8
5	Poland	7	1	6	0	21	80	−59	2
6	Switzerland	7	0	7	0	15	62	−47	0
DQ	Canada (Note: The game between Canada and the Soviet Union was declared null and void, and is excluded from the final standings.)	6	4	1	1	41	23	+18	9
DQ	Soviet Union	6	2	3	1	27	20	+7	5

Source: Hockey Canada
Notes:

Switzerland was relegated to Pool B for the 1988 World Junior Ice Hockey Championships.

== Results ==
All times are local. (Central European Time – UTC+1)

December 26, 1986	Canada	6–4 (5-2, 1-1, 0-1)	Switzerland	Topvar Aréna, Topolcany

Jimmy Waite
Goalies
Beat Aebischer

Elynuik (Chiasson - 0:31	1-0
McLlwain (Latta) - 6:45	2-0
Elynuik (McLlwain) - 7:24	3-0
McLlwain (SH) - 12:20	4-0
	4-1	12:52 - Künzi (PP)
Nemeth (Metcalfe) - 15:36	5-1
	5-2	16:41 - Walder
McLlwain (Latta) - 33:22	6-2
	6-3	38:32 - Mattioni (Walder) (PP)
	6-4	54:23 - Nyffenegger

December 26, 1986	Soviet Union	7–3	Poland	B.O.F. Arena, Trenčín

December 26, 1986	Czechoslovakia	4–1	Sweden	Nitra Aréna, Nitra

December 26, 1986	Finland	4–1	United States	Zimný Štadión Piešťany, Piešťany

December 27, 1986	Canada	6–6 (1-0, 2-5, 3-1)	Finland	B.O.F. Arena, Trenčín

December 27, 1986	Soviet Union	8–0	Switzerland	Zimný Štadión Piešťany, Piešťany

December 27, 1986	Sweden	15–0	Poland	Topvar Aréna, Topolcany

December 27, 1986	United States	8–2	Czechoslovakia	Nitra Aréna, Nitra

December 29, 1986	Czechoslovakia	5–1 (1-0, 1-1, 3-0)	Canada	Nitra Aréna, Nitra

Oldrich Svoboda
Goalies
Shawn Simpson

Lubina - 0:14	1-0
Hosták - 30:26	2-0
	2-1	37:06 - Hawgood
Latal (Jurík) - 42:54	3-1
Lubina (Hosták) - 53:53	4-1
Kron (PP) - 58:36	5-1

35
Shots
18

December 29, 1986	Sweden	8–0	Switzerland	Zimný Štadión Piešťany, Piešťany

December 29, 1986	United States	15–2	Poland	B.O.F. Arena, Trenčín

December 29, 1986	Finland	5–4	Soviet Union	Topvar Aréna, Topolcany

December 30, 1986	Canada	18–3 (7-0, 5-1, 6-2)	Poland	Nitra Aréna, Nitra

Jimmy Waite (8-11), Shawn Simpson (11-11)
Goalies
Wlodzimierz Krauzowicz (14-21), Grzegorz Wojakiewicz (21-32)

Nemeth (Hawgood) - 7:50	1-0
Sanipass (Fleury) - 13:30	2-0
Shanahan (Metcalfe, Nemeth) - 13:43	3-0
Fleury (Sanipass) - 15:22	4-0
Elynuik (Metcalfe) - 16:17	5-0
Turgeon - 16:53	6-0
Sanipass (Huffman) - 18:05	7-0
	7-1	22:46 - Neidospial (PP)
Fleury (PP) - 26:17	8-1
Elynuik (Roy) - 26:58	9-1
Nemeth (Shanahan) - 33:55	10-1
Turgeon (Joseph, Corriveau) - 36:55	11-1
Wesley (Fleury) - 38:09	12-1
Corriveau - 40:35	13-1
	13-2	45:55 - Merta (Raszewski)
Elynuik (Nemeth) - 46:53	14-2
Shanahan (Nemeth, Metcalfe) - 50:05	15-2
Latta (Shanahan, Elynuik) - 51:17	16-2
Chiasson (Latta) - 52:26	17-2
Joseph - 54:25	18-2
	18-3	57:47 - Kasperczyk (PP)

53
Shots
22

December 30, 1986	Sweden	5–0	Finland	Zimný Štadión Piešťany, Piešťany

December 30, 1986	United States	12–6	Switzerland	Topvar Aréna, Topolcany

December 30, 1986	Czechoslovakia	5–3	Soviet Union	B.O.F. Arena, Trenčín

January 1, 1987; 16:00	Czechoslovakia	9–2	Poland	Topvar Aréna, Topolcany

January 1, 1987; 19:00	Canada	6–2 (3-1, 1-1, 2-0)	United States	Zimný Štadión Piešťany, Piešťany

Jimmy Waite
Goalies
Pat Jablonski

McLlwain (Elynuik) (PP) - 3:21	1-0
Sanipass (Fleury, Keane) - 5:03	2-0
Nemeth (Roy) (PP) - 15:33	3-0
	3-1	19:24 - Turcotte (Davidson)
	3-2	20:33 - Young (Leetch)
Elynuik (Latta) - 27:42	4-2
Wesley (Shanahan) - 44:27	5-2
Elynuik (Latta) - 59:00	6-2

31
Shots
24

January 1, 1987; 19:00	Finland	12–1	Switzerland	B.O.F. Arena, Trenčín

January 1, 1987; 20:00	Soviet Union	3–3	Sweden	Nitra Aréna, Nitra

January 2, 1987; 16:00	Czechoslovakia	8–1	Switzerland	Zimný Štadión Piešťany, Piešťany

January 2, 1987; 19:00	Finland	13–3	Poland	Nitra Aréna, Nitra

January 2, 1987; 19:00	United States	4–2	Soviet Union	Topvar Aréna, Topolcany

January 2, 1987; 20:00	Canada	4–3 (2-0, 1-1, 1-2)	Sweden	B.O.F. Arena, Trenčín

Jimmy Waite
Goalies
Sam Lindståhl

Latta (McLlwain) (PP) - 3:53	1-0
Metcalfe - 12:58	2-0
	2-1	Franzén (Sjögren, Hansson) - 22:20
Hawgood (Wesley) (PP) - 38:18	3-1
	3-2	Sandström (Sjögren) (PP) - 53:58
	3-3	Dahlén (Hansson, Öhman) (PP) - 55:46
Shanahan (Hawgood, Metcalfe) - 58:10	4-3

16 min
Penalties
10 min
15
Shots
36

January 4, 1987; 16:00	Finland	5–3	Czechoslovakia	Nitra Aréna, Nitra

January 4, 1987; 19:00	Poland	8–3	Switzerland	Topvar Aréna, Topolcany

January 4, 1987; 19:00	Sweden	8–0	United States	B.O.F. Arena, Trenčín

January 4, 1987; 20:00	Canada	Game declared null and void (3–1, 1–1, Not Played)	Soviet Union	Zimný Štadión Piešťany, Piešťany

Jimmy Waite
Goalies
Valeri Ivannikov
Referee:
(Norway) Hans Rønning
Linesmen:
(Finland) Peter Pomoell
(Poland) Julian Gorski

Fleury (Keane, Sanipass) – 4:34	1 – 0
	1 – 1	04:45 - Shesterikov (Zelepukin)
Latta (Hawgood) - 15:32	2 – 1
Fleury - 18:47	3 – 1
	3 – 2	31:13 - Kostichkin (Tsygurov) (PP)
Nemeth - 32:08	4 – 2

DQ – DQ
12 min
Penalties
14 min

=== Scoring leaders ===
Rank	Player	Country	G	A	Pts
1	Ulf Dahlén	Sweden	7	8	15
2	Teppo Kivelä	Finland	6	7	13
3	Janne Ojanen	Finland	3	9	12
3	Jukka Seppo	Finland	3	9	12
5	Scott Young	United States	7	4	11
6	Pär Edlund	Sweden	5	6	11
6	Roger Öhman	Sweden	5	6	11
8	Sami Wahlsten	Finland	4	7	11
9	Bo Svanberg	Sweden	7	3	10
9	Martin Hosták	Czechoslovakia	7	3	10

- Canada and the USSR were disqualified from the final scoring standings; Canada's Pat Elynuik had 11 points.

=== Tournament awards ===
	IIHF Directorate Awards	Media All-Star Team
Goaltender	(Finland) Markus Ketterer	(Sweden) Sam Lindstahl
Defencemen	(Sweden) Calle Johansson	(Czechoslovakia) Jiří Látal (United States) Brian Leetch
Forwards	(Czechoslovakia) Robert Kron	(Czechoslovakia) Juraj Jurík (Sweden) Ulf Dahlén (United States) Scott Young

== Pool B ==
Took place from March 15 to 21 in Rouen France. Two groups of four played round robins, the top two and bottom two from the respective groups met up in two final round robins to determine placement. Teams did not replay opponents they were grouped with previously, their scores were carried forward to the final rounds.

=== Preliminary round ===
Group A

Team	Pld	W	L	D	GF	GA	GD	Pts	West Germany men's national junior ice hockey team	Japan men's national junior ice hockey team	France men's national junior ice hockey team	Romania men's national junior ice hockey team
West Germany	3	2	0	1	24	8	+16	5		6–3	2–2	16–3
Japan	3	2	1	0	17	14	+3	4	3–6		3–1	11–7
France	3	1	1	1	7	8	−1	3	2–2	1–3		4–3
Romania	3	0	3	0	13	31	−18	0	3–16	7–11	3–4	

Group B

Team	Pld	W	L	D	GF	GA	GD	Pts	Norway men's national junior ice hockey team	Austria men's national junior ice hockey team	Netherlands men's national junior ice hockey team	Italy men's national junior ice hockey team
Norway	3	2	0	1	28	7	+21	5		11–1	5–5	12–1
Austria	3	1	1	1	11	19	−8	3	1–11		6–4	4–4
Netherlands	3	1	1	1	16	16	0	3	5–5	4–6		7–5
Italy	3	0	2	1	10	23	−13	1	1–12	4–4	5–7	

=== Final Round ===
Promotion Group

Team	Pld	W	L	D	GF	GA	GD	Pts	West Germany men's national junior ice hockey team	Norway men's national junior ice hockey team	Japan men's national junior ice hockey team	Austria men's national junior ice hockey team
West Germany	3	3	0	0	30	6	+24	6		13–3	6–3	11–0
Norway	3	2	1	0	21	19	+2	4	3–13		7–5	11–1
Japan	3	1	2	0	14	16	−2	2	3–6	5–7		6–3
Austria	3	0	3	0	4	28	−24	0	0–11	1–11	3–6	

West Germany was promoted to Pool A for 1988.

Relegation Group

Team	Pld	W	L	D	GF	GA	GD	Pts	France men's national junior ice hockey team	Romania men's national junior ice hockey team	Netherlands men's national junior ice hockey team	Italy men's national junior ice hockey team
France	3	3	0	0	18	11	+7	6		4–3	7–5	7–3
Romania	3	2	1	0	15	9	+6	4	3–4		7–4	5–1
Netherlands	3	1	2	0	16	19	−3	2	5–7	4–7		7–5
Italy	3	0	3	0	9	19	−10	0	3–7	1–5	5–7	

Italy was Demoted to Pool C for 1988.

== Pool C ==
Pool C was played in Esbjerg, Denmark from March 16 to 22.

Standings

Pos	Team	Pld	W	L	D	GF	GA	GD	Pts	Yugoslavia men's national junior ice hockey team	Denmark men's national junior ice hockey team	Great Britain men's national junior ice hockey team	Bulgaria men's national junior ice hockey team	Spain men's national junior ice hockey team	Australia men's national junior ice hockey team
1	Yugoslavia	5	5	0	0	56	12	+44	10		13–4	6–4	5–1	11–2	21–1
2	Denmark	5	4	1	0	44	24	+20	8	4–13		11–4	8–3	7–3	14–1
3	Great Britain	5	3	2	0	25	21	+4	6	4–6	4–11		4–2	6–2	7–0
4	Bulgaria	5	2	3	0	21	23	−2	4	1–5	3–8	2–4		8–5	7–1
5	Spain	5	1	4	0	19	34	−15	2	2–11	3–7	2–6	5–8		7–2
6	Australia	5	0	5	0	5	56	−51	0	1–21	1–14	0–7	1–7	2–7	

Yugoslavia was promoted to Pool B for 1988.
