= 1986 World Junior Ice Hockey Championships =

1986 IIHF World U20 Championship

Tournament details
- Host country: Canada
- Venues: 15 (in 15 host cities)
- Dates: December 26, 1985 – January 4, 1986
- Teams: 8

Final positions
- Champions: Soviet Union (7th title)
- Runners-up: Canada
- Third place: United States
- Fourth place: Czechoslovakia

Tournament statistics
- Games played: 28
- Goals scored: 246 (8.79 per game)
- Attendance: 154,172 (5,506 per game)
- Scoring leader: (Canada) Shayne Corson (14 points)

The 1986 World Junior Ice Hockey Championships (1986 WJHC) was the tenth edition of the Ice Hockey World Junior Championship and was held from December 26, 1985, until January 4, 1986. It was held mainly in Hamilton, Ontario, Canada. The Soviet Union won the gold medal, its seventh championship, Canada won silver and the United States won bronze. The bronze was the first medal for the Americans in the tournament's history.

== Final standings ==
The 1986 tournament was a round-robin format, with the top three teams winning gold, silver and bronze medals respectively.

Pos	Team	Pld	W	L	D	GF	GA	GD	Pts
1	Soviet Union	7	7	0	0	42	14	+28	14
2	Canada	7	5	2	0	54	21	+33	10
3	United States	7	4	3	0	35	26	+9	8
4	Czechoslovakia	7	4	3	0	30	20	+10	8
5	Sweden	7	4	3	0	26	23	+3	8
6	Finland	7	3	4	0	31	23	+8	6
7	Switzerland	7	1	6	0	19	54	−35	2
8	West Germany	7	0	7	0	9	65	−56	0

Source: Hockey Canada

West Germany was relegated to Pool B for 1987.

== Results ==
December 26, 1985	Canada	12–1	Switzerland	Hamilton

December 26, 1985	Soviet Union	7–3	United States	London

December 26, 1985	Sweden	2–0	Finland	Orillia

December 26, 1985	Czechoslovakia	9–3	West Germany	Newmarket

December 27, 1985	Canada	18–2	West Germany	Kitchener

December 27, 1985	Finland	9–2	Switzerland	St. Catharines

December 27, 1985	Soviet Union	6–1	Sweden	Oshawa

December 27, 1985	United States	5–2	Czechoslovakia	Hamilton

December 29, 1985	Canada	5–2	United States	Hamilton

December 29, 1985	Soviet Union	7–3	Switzerland	Guelph

December 29, 1985	Sweden	3–2	Czechoslovakia	Stratford

December 29, 1985	Finland	7–2	West Germany	Toronto

December 30, 1985	Canada	9–2	Sweden	Hamilton

December 30, 1985	Czechoslovakia	7–2	Switzerland	Dundas

December 30, 1985	Soviet Union	10–0	West Germany	Kitchener

December 30, 1985	Finland	7–5	United States	Oshawa

January 1, 1986	Canada	6–5	Finland	Toronto

January 1, 1986	Soviet Union	4–3	Czechoslovakia	London

January 1, 1986	United States	4–1	West Germany	Hamilton

January 1, 1986	Sweden	7–1	Switzerland	Oakville

January 2, 1986	Soviet Union	4–1	Canada	Hamilton

January 2, 1986	Czechoslovakia	2–0	Finland	Brantford

January 2, 1986	Sweden	10–0	West Germany	Halton Hills

January 2, 1986	United States	11–3	Switzerland	Niagara Falls

January 4, 1986	Czechoslovakia	5–3	Canada	Hamilton

January 4, 1986	United States	5–1	Sweden	Hamilton

January 4, 1986	Switzerland	7–1	West Germany	Brantford

January 4, 1986	Soviet Union	4–3	Finland	Hamilton

=== Scoring leaders ===
Rank	Player	Country	G	A	Pts
1	Shayne Corson	Canada	7	7	14
2	Joe Murphy	Canada	4	10	14
3	Valeri Kamensky	Soviet Union	7	6	13
4	Joe Nieuwendyk	Canada	7	5	12
4	Jim Sandlak	Canada	7	5	12
4	Radek Ťoupal	Czechoslovakia	7	5	12
7	Stephen Leach	United States	6	5	11
8	Jiří Kučera	Czechoslovakia	5	5	10
8	Michal Pivoňka	Czechoslovakia	5	5	10
8	Igor Vyazmikin	Soviet Union	5	5	10

=== Tournament awards ===
	IIHF Directorate Awards	Media All-Star Team
Goaltender	(Soviet Union) Yevgeni Belosheikin	(Soviet Union) Yevgeni Belosheikin
Defencemen	(Soviet Union) Mikhail Tatarinov	(Canada) Sylvain Côté (Soviet Union) Mikhail Tatarinov
Forwards	(Canada) Jim Sandlak	(Czechoslovakia) Michal Pivoňka (Canada) Shayne Corson (Soviet Union) Igor Vyazmikin

== Pool B ==
Eight teams contested the second tier this year in Klagenfurt Austria from March 13 to 22. It was played in a simple round robin format, each team playing seven games.

Standings

Pos	Team	Pld	W	L	D	GF	GA	GD	Pts	Poland men's national junior ice hockey team	Norway men's national junior ice hockey team	Austria men's national junior ice hockey team	Romania men's national junior ice hockey team	Japan men's national junior ice hockey team	Netherlands men's national junior ice hockey team	Italy men's national junior ice hockey team	Bulgaria men's national junior ice hockey team
1	Poland	7	6	1	0	46	17	+29	12		4–3	12–1	4–2	3–0	8–9	9–2	6–0
2	Norway	7	5	1	1	54	18	+36	11	3–4		10–6	4–4	8–0	12–0	4–3	13–1
3	Austria	7	5	2	0	42	35	+7	10	1–12	6–10		4–3	6–5	8–0	9–3	8–2
4	Romania	7	3	2	2	32	28	+4	8	2–4	4–4	3–4		7–5	6–5	4–4	6–2
5	Japan	7	3	4	0	35	31	+4	6	0–3	0–8	5–6	5–7		6–5	7–2	12–0
6	Netherlands	7	3	4	0	30	43	−13	6	9–8	0–12	0–8	5–6	5–6		4–2	7–1
7	Italy	7	1	5	1	26	40	−14	3	2–9	3–4	3–9	4–4	2–7	2–4		10–3
8	Bulgaria	7	0	7	0	9	62	−53	0	0–6	1–13	2–8	2–6	0–12	1–7	3–10	

Legend: Blue = home team win; Red = away team win; Yellow = draw.

Poland was promoted to Pool A and Bulgaria was relegated to Pool C for 1987.

== Pool C ==
This tournament was played in Gap, France, from March 21 to 27. China made its debut in the junior tournament.

Standings

Pos	Team	Pld	W	L	D	GF	GA	GD	Pts	France men's national junior ice hockey team	Denmark men's national junior ice hockey team	Great Britain men's national junior ice hockey team	China men's national junior ice hockey team	Hungary men's national junior ice hockey team	Belgium men's national junior ice hockey team
1	France	5	4	0	1	52	13	+39	9		4–4	14–2	11–4	10–2	13–1
2	Denmark	5	3	0	2	29	16	+13	8	4–4		10–4	4–2	7–2	4–4
3	Great Britain	5	3	2	0	20	32	−12	6	2–14	4–10		6–4	4–2	4–2
4	China	5	2	3	0	23	27	−4	4	4–11	2–4	4–6		6–4	7–2
5	Hungary	5	1	4	0	16	32	−16	2	2–10	2–7	2–4	4–6		6–5
6	Belgium	5	0	4	1	14	34	−20	1	1–13	4–4	2–4	2–7	5–6	

Legend: Blue = home team win; Red = away team win; Yellow = draw.

France was promoted to Pool B for 1987.
