= 1993 Stanley Cup playoffs =

Tournament details
- Dates: April 18–June 9, 1993
- Teams: 16
- Defending champions: Pittsburgh Penguins

Final positions
- Champions: Montreal Canadiens
- Runners-up: Los Angeles Kings

Tournament statistics
- Scoring leader(s): Wayne Gretzky (Kings) (40 points)

Awards
- MVP: Patrick Roy (Canadiens)

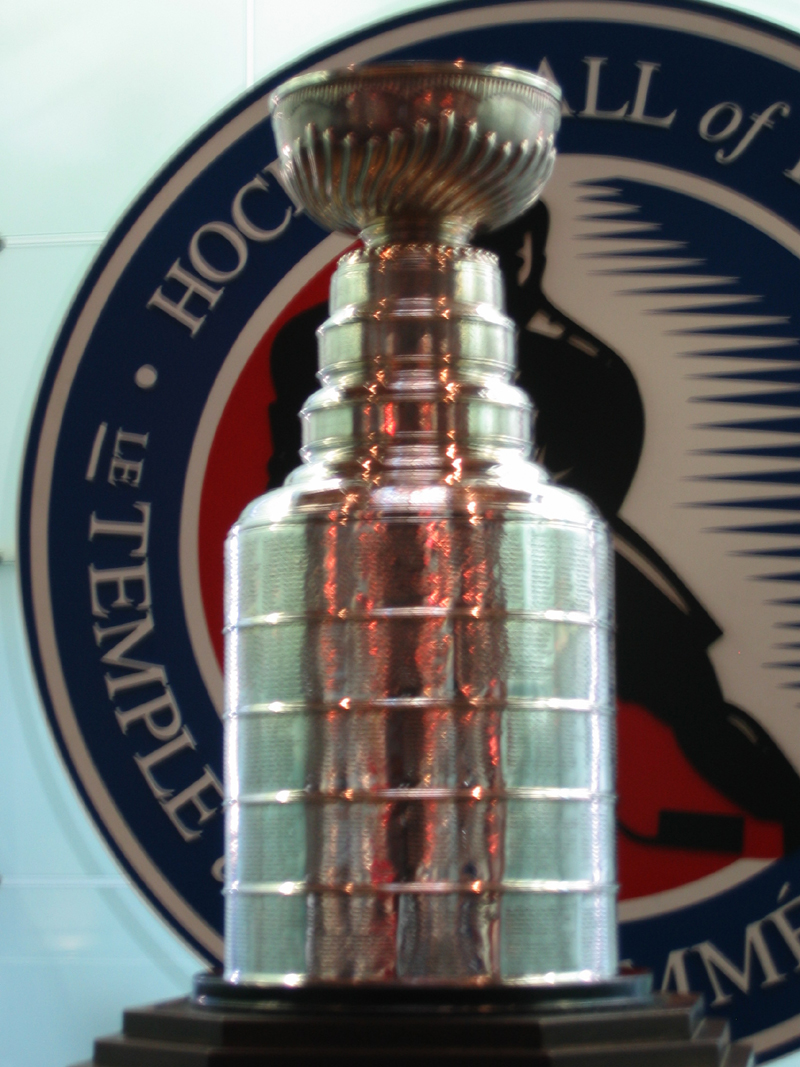
The Stanley Cup at the Hockey Hall of Fame

The 1993 Stanley Cup playoffs the playoff tournament of the National Hockey League (NHL) began after the conclusion of the 1992–93 NHL season on April 18 and ended with the Montreal Canadiens defeating the Los Angeles Kings four games to one to win the Stanley Cup on June 9. These playoffs featured an NHL record 28 overtime games, of which the Canadiens set a playoff record for most overtime games won and consecutively in a single postseason with ten. The Canadiens also won 11 consecutive games during the playoffs, tying an NHL record.

The Presidents' Trophy-winning Pittsburgh Penguins, who had won the Stanley Cup the previous two years, were the favorite to repeat. However, both conferences saw numerous upsets as the third place team in every division reached their respective conference finals. This was the first time since the 1979 NHL-WHA merger that the Edmonton Oilers had missed the playoffs. It was also the first time that longtime Oilers and then-New York Rangers captain Mark Messier had missed the playoffs in his career. This was the only year between 1984 and 1994 that the Boston Bruins and Montreal Canadiens did not face each other in the playoffs. This was the last time that the New York Islanders won a playoff round before 2016. It was also the first time in the post-1967 expansion era that no team with a losing record qualified for the playoffs. Montreal's Cup championship remains the last time that a Canadian team won the Stanley Cup.

== Playoff seeds ==
This marked the final season of the NHL's division-oriented playoff format, first used in 1982, which saw the top four teams in each division qualify for the playoffs. A similar version of this playoff format would later be used for the 2021 Stanley Cup playoffs as a result of the COVID-19 pandemic.

The following teams qualified for the playoffs:

=== Prince of Wales Conference ===
==== Adams Division ====
1. Boston Bruins, Adams Division champions – 109 points
2. Quebec Nordiques – 104 points
3. Montreal Canadiens – 102 points
4. Buffalo Sabres – 86 points

==== Patrick Division ====
1. Pittsburgh Penguins, Patrick Division champions, Prince of Wales Conference regular season champions, Presidents' Trophy winners – 119 points
2. Washington Capitals – 93 points
3. New York Islanders – 87 points (40 wins, 10 points head-to-head vs. New Jersey)
4. New Jersey Devils – 87 points (40 wins, 4 points head-to-head vs. NY Islanders)

=== Clarence Campbell Conference ===
==== Norris Division ====
1. Chicago Blackhawks, Norris Division champions, Clarence Campbell Conference regular season champions – 106 points
2. Detroit Red Wings – 103 points
3. Toronto Maple Leafs – 99 points
4. St. Louis Blues – 85 points

==== Smythe Division ====
1. Vancouver Canucks, Smythe Division champions – 101 points
2. Calgary Flames – 97 points
3. Los Angeles Kings – 88 points
4. Winnipeg Jets – 87 points

== Playoff bracket ==
In the division semifinals, the fourth seeded team in each division played against the division winner from their division. The other series matched the second and third place teams from the divisions. The two winning teams from each division's semifinals then met in the division finals. The two division winners of each conference then played in the conference finals. The two conference winners then advanced to the Stanley Cup Final.

In each round, teams competed in a best-of-seven series following a 2–2–1–1–1 format (scores in the bracket indicate the number of games won in each best-of-seven series). Home ice advantage was awarded to the team that had the better regular season record, and played at home for games one and two (and games five and seven, if necessary); the other team then played at home for games three and four (and game six, if necessary).

Division semifinals	Division finals
A1	Boston	0
A4	Buffalo	4
A4	Buffalo	0
A3	Montreal	4
A2	Quebec	2
A3	Montreal	4
Prince of Wales Conference
P1	Pittsburgh	4
P4	New Jersey	1
P1	Pittsburgh	3
P3	NY Islanders	4
P2	Washington	2
P3	NY Islanders	4
N1	Chicago	0
N4	St. Louis	4
N4	St. Louis	3
N3	Toronto	4
N2	Detroit	3
N3	Toronto	4
Clarence Campbell Conference
S1	Vancouver	4
S4	Winnipeg	2
S1	Vancouver	2
S3	Los Angeles	4
S2	Calgary	2
S3	Los Angeles	4

Conference finals
A3	Montreal	4
P3	NY Islanders	1
N3	Toronto	3
S3	Los Angeles	4

Stanley Cup Final
A3	Montreal	4
S3	Los Angeles	1

== Division semifinals ==
=== Prince of Wales Conference ===
==== (A1) Boston Bruins vs. (A4) Buffalo Sabres ====
This was the sixth playoff series meeting between the Sabres and Bruins. Boston won all five previous series head-to-head, including last year's Adams Division Semifinals in seven games. Although Boston had entered the playoffs with the second best record in the entire NHL and the Sabres had the second lowest point total of any playoff team, Buffalo upset the Bruins by sweeping the heavily favored Boston squad. The fourth game saw Brad May's game-winning goal in overtime, which has become famous in NHL lore thanks to Rick Jeanneret's "May day!" call. This was the first playoff series victory for Buffalo since defeating Montreal in the 1983 Adams Division Semifinals.

April 18	Buffalo Sabres	5–4	OT	Boston Bruins	Boston Garden	Recap
Dave Hannan (1) – 02:32; Pat LaFontaine (1) – 09:26		First period		No scoring
Alexander Mogilny (1) – 19:55		Second period		07:20 – pp – Joe Juneau (1); 14:42 – Cam Neely (1)
Alexander Mogilny (2) – 03:46		Third period		15:44 – Cam Neely (2); 17:00 – Steve Heinze (1)
Bob Sweeney (1) – 11:03		First overtime period		No scoring
Grant Fuhr 28 saves / 32 shots		Goalie stats		Andy Moog 24 saves / 29 shots

April 20	Buffalo Sabres	4–0	Boston Bruins	Boston Garden	Recap
Wayne Presley (1) – sh – 04:27; Randy Wood (1) – pp – 08:07		First period	No scoring
Alexander Mogilny (3) – 05:03		Second period	No scoring
Dale Hawerchuk (1) – pp – 14:48		Third period	No scoring
Grant Fuhr 34 saves / 34 shots		Goalie stats	Andy Moog 7 saves / 10 shots John Blue 14 saves / 15 shots

April 22	Boston Bruins	3–4	OT	Buffalo Sabres	Buffalo Memorial Auditorium	Recap
Ray Bourque (1) – pp – 17:33		First period		01:33 – pp – Alexander Mogilny (4); 04:42 – Yuri Khmylev (1)
No scoring		Second period		No scoring
Bryan Smolinski (1) – 13:28; Cam Neely (3) – 15:57		Third period		14:56 – Bob Sweeney (2)
No scoring		First overtime period		01:05 – pp – Yuri Kmylev (2)
John Blue 30 saves / 34 shots		Goalie stats		Grant Fuhr 31 saves / 34 shots

April 24	Boston Bruins	5–6	OT	Buffalo Sabres	Buffalo Memorial Auditorium	Recap
Cam Neely (4) – 02:19; Joe Juneau (2) – pp – 14:15; Peter Douris (1) – 14:50; Stephen Leach (1) – 19:48		First period		10:09 – pp – Alexander Mogilny (5); 15:46 – Dale Hawerchuk (2)
Dave Poulin (1) – sh – 02:13		Second period		03:58 – Donald Audette (1)
No scoring		Third period		10:43 – Alexander Mogilny (6); 11:36 – Yuri Khmylev (3)
No scoring		First overtime period		04:48 – Brad May (1)
Andy Moog 22 saves / 28 shots		Goalie stats		Grant Fuhr 8 saves / 12 shots Dominik Hasek 23 saves / 24 shots

Buffalo wins 4–0

==== (A2) Quebec Nordiques vs. (A3) Montreal Canadiens ====
This was the fifth playoff meeting between these two rivals with the teams splitting the four previous series. This was the final playoff series between the provincial rivals before the Nordiques moved to Denver in 1995 and became the Colorado Avalanche. They last met in the 1987 Adams Division Finals, which Montreal won in seven games.

The Canadiens lost the first two games of this series against the rival Nordiques, due in part to a couple of weak goals let in by star Montreal goaltender Patrick Roy. Afterward, a newspaper in Roy's hometown district suggested he be traded, while Nordiques goaltending coach Dan Bouchard also proclaimed that his team had solved Roy. However, Montreal head coach Jacques Demers held himself to a promise he had made to Roy earlier in the season and kept him as the starting goalie.

With Montreal staring a potential 3–0 series deficit to Quebec in the face, overtime in Game 3 was marked by two disputed goals that were reviewed by the video goal judge. The first review ruled that Stephan Lebeau had knocked the puck in with a high stick, but the second upheld Montreal's winning goal as it was directed in by the skate of Quebec defenceman Alexei Gusarov and not that of a Montreal player. The Game 3 overtime victory was the first in a record-setting streak of 10 consecutive overtime victories by the Canadiens in these playoffs.

April 18	Montreal Canadiens	2–3	OT	Quebec Nordiques	Quebec Coliseum	Recap
Gilbert Dionne (1) – 05:52		First period		No scoring
Brian Bellows (1) – 09:58		Second period		No scoring
No scoring		Third period		18:31 – pp – Martin Rucinsky (1); 19:12 – Joe Sakic (1)
No scoring		First overtime period		16:49 – Scott Young (1)
Patrick Roy 34 saves / 37 shots		Goalie stats		Ron Hextall 36 saves / 38 shots

April 20	Montreal Canadiens	1–4	Quebec Nordiques	Quebec Coliseum	Recap
No scoring		First period	04:19 – pp – Curtis Leschyshyn (1); 11:41 – Scott Young (2); 13:56 – Scott Young (3)
No scoring		Second period	No scoring
Brian Bellows (2) – 11:05		Third period	19:23 – en – Claude Lapointe (1)
Patrick Roy 34 saves / 37 shots		Goalie stats	Ron Hextall 32 saves / 33 shots

April 22	Quebec Nordiques	1–2	OT	Montreal Canadiens	Montreal Forum	Recap
Mats Sundin (1) – 01:17		First period		No scoring
No scoring		Second period		01:30 – pp – Kirk Muller (1)
No scoring		Third period		No scoring
No scoring		First overtime period		10:30 – pp – Vincent Damphousse (1)
Ron Hextall 48 saves / 50 shots		Goalie stats		Patrick Roy 34 saves / 35 shots

April 24	Quebec Nordiques	2–3	Montreal Canadiens	Montreal Forum	Recap
Scott Young (4) – 09:25		First period	05:28 – pp – Vincent Damphousse (2)
Joe Sakic (2) – 17:56		Second period	09:21 – Gary Leeman (1)
No scoring		Third period	01:07 – Benoit Brunet (1)
Ron Hextall 34 saves / 37 shots		Goalie stats	Patrick Roy 25 saves / 27 shots

April 26	Montreal Canadiens	5–4	OT	Quebec Nordiques	Quebec Coliseum	Recap
Mike Keane (1) – 04:24		First period		No scoring
Vincent Damphousse (3) – 11:00; Eric Desjardins (1) – 17:14		Second period		01:46 – Andrei Kovalenko (1); 08:17 – pp – Mats Sundin (2); 17:34 – Owen Nolan (1)
Gilbert Dionne (2) – 13:23		Third period		06:16 – Mats Sundin (3)
Kirk Muller (2) – 08:17		First overtime period		No scoring
Patrick Roy 35 saves / 37 shots Andre Racicot 7 saves / 9 shots		Goalie stats		Ron Hextall 25 saves / 30 shots

April 28	Quebec Nordiques	2–6	Montreal Canadiens	Montreal Forum	Recap
No scoring		First period	06:29 – Ed Ronan (1)
Claude Lapointe (2) – 02:08; Joe Sakic (3) – pp – 06:25		Second period	01:13 – Paul DiPietro (1); 11:00 – Paul DiPietro (2); 17:08 – Kirk Muller (3)
No scoring		Third period	11:23 – Paul DiPietro (3); 17:28 – pp – Gilbert Dionne (3)
Ron Hextall 18 saves / 23 shots Stephane Fiset 11 saves / 12 shots		Goalie stats	Patrick Roy 28 saves / 30 shots

Montreal won series 4–2

==== (P1) Pittsburgh Penguins vs. (P4) New Jersey Devils ====
This was the second playoff series between these two teams. Pittsburgh won the only previous meeting in the 1991 Patrick Division Semifinals in seven games.

The two-time defending Stanley Cup champions were a heavy favorite to be the first team since the 1980–1983 New York Islanders to win more than two consecutive Cups. Entering the playoffs as the Presidents' Trophy winner, the Penguins faced off against the fourth place team from their division the New Jersey Devils. By winning the first three games of the series, Pittsburgh extended its playoff winning streak to 14 games; this dated back to Game 4 of the 1992 Patrick Division Final against the New York Rangers and set an NHL playoff record for longest winning streak. The streak ended in Game 4 when the Devils defeated Pittsburgh, 4–1. The Penguins quickly closed out the Devils in the next game by a score of 5–2 to advance to the second round.

April 18	New Jersey Devils	3–6	Pittsburgh Penguins	Civic Arena	Recap
Dave Barr (1) – 06:24		First period	01:40 – pp – Rick Tocchet (1); 09:33 – Mario Lemieux (1)
No scoring		Second period	04:11 – pp – Mario Lemieux (2); 12:57 – Ron Francis (1); 17:13 – Dave Tippett (1)
Scott Stevens (1) – pp – 11:48; Scott Stevens (2) – 18:56		Third period	08:35 – pp – Jaromir Jagr (1)
Chris Terreri 27 saves / 33 shots		Goalie stats	Tom Barrasso 32 saves / 35 shots

April 20	New Jersey Devils	0–7	Pittsburgh Penguins	Civic Arena	Recap
No scoring		First period	15:09 – Shawn McEachern (1); 17:41 – sh – Mario Lemieux (3)
No scoring		Second period	03:48 – Rick Tocchet (2); 12:39 – Jaromir Jagr (2); 15:43 – pp – Kevin Stevens (1); 16:56 – Shawn McEachern (2)
No scoring		Third period	17:42 – Joe Mullen (1)
Chris Terreri 17 saves / 23 shots Craig Billington 3 saves / 4 shots		Goalie stats	Tom Barrasso 36 saves / 36 shots

April 22	Pittsburgh Penguins	4–3	New Jersey Devils	Brendan Byrne Arena	Recap
Shawn McEachern (3) – 09:36		First period	01:03 – Bill Guerin (1)
No scoring		Second period	16:32 – Bobby Holik (1)
Mario Lemieux (4) – 01:07; Peter Taglianetti (1) – 07:05; Larry Murphy (1) – pp – 09:31		Third period	09:44 – Alexander Semak (1)
Tom Barrasso 29 saves / 32 shots		Goalie stats	Craig Billington 31 saves / 35 shots

April 25	Pittsburgh Penguins	1–4	New Jersey Devils	Brendan Byrne Arena	Recap
No scoring		First period	05:22 – pp – Stephane Richer (1)
No scoring		Second period	19:50 – pp – Tommy Albelin (1)
Kevin Stevens (2) – 03:28		Third period	01:52 – pp – Claude Lemieux (1); 19:42 – en – Claude Lemieux (2)
Tom Barrasso 23 saves / 26 shots		Goalie stats	Chris Terreri 30 saves / 31 shots

April 26	New Jersey Devils	3–5	Pittsburgh Penguins	Civic Arena	Recap
No scoring		First period	05:04 – pp – Mario Lemieux (5); 18:23 – Rick Tocchet (3)
Stephane Richer (2) – 01:35; Bruce Driver (1) – sh – 09:22; Tommy Albelin (2) – 13:58		Second period	No scoring
No scoring		Third period	07:07 – pp – Ron Francis (2); 07:28 – Jeff Daniels (1); 18:59 – en – Jeff Daniels (2)
Chris Terreri 27 saves / 31 shots		Goalie stats	Tom Barrasso 19 saves / 22 shots

Pittsburgh won series 4–1

==== (P2) Washington Capitals vs. (P3) New York Islanders ====
This was the sixth playoff series between these two teams. New York previous won four of the first five meetings all from 1983 to 1987. The last of those meetings was won by New York in the famed "Easter Epic" in the 1987 Patrick Division Semifinals.

Game six of this series was marred by a vicious hit by the Capitals' Dale Hunter on the Islanders' leading scorer, Pierre Turgeon, moments after Turgeon had scored a third-period goal to put the game and the series out of reach for Washington. Turgeon suffered a separated shoulder on the play and missed almost all of the next round. For his actions, Hunter was suspended for the first 21 games of the 1993–94 season. This was the Islanders first playoff series victory since their 1987 triumph over Washington.

April 18	New York Islanders	1–3	Washington Capitals	Capital Centre	Recap
Ray Ferraro (1) – 05:56		First period	No scoring
No scoring		Second period	No scoring
No scoring		Third period	03:18 – Dale Hunter (1); 07:01 – pp – Dale Hunter (2); 15:25 – pp – Dmitri Khristich (1)
Glenn Healy 24 saves / 27 shots		Goalie stats	Rick Tabaracci 22 saves / 23 shots

April 20	New York Islanders	5–4	2OT	Washington Capitals	Capital Centre	Recap
Pierre Turgeon (1) – 13:14		First period		No scoring
Pierre Turgeon (2) – 12:36		Second period		06:33 – Dale Hunter (3); 16:51 – pp – Dale Hunter (4)
Benoit Hogue (1) – 03:31; Ray Ferraro (2) – 14:50		Third period		07:16 – Dmitri Khristich (2); 19:57 – pp – Dale Hunter (5)
Brian Mullen (1) – 14:50		Second overtime period		No scoring
Glenn Healy 41 saves / 45 shots		Goalie stats		Rick Tabaracci 56 saves / 61 shots

April 22	Washington Capitals	3–4	OT	New York Islanders	Nassau Veterans Memorial Coliseum	Recap
Randy Burridge (1) – 18:58		First period		16:37 – Steve Thomas (1)
Bobby Carpenter (1) – 06:18		Second period		No scoring
Pat Elynuik (1) – 06:15		Third period		11:11 – Steve Thomas (2); 19:17 – Pierre Turgeon (3)
No scoring		First overtime period		04:46 – Ray Ferraro (3)
Rick Tabaracci 26 saves / 30 shots		Goalie stats		Glenn Healy 22 saves / 25 shots

April 24	Washington Capitals	3–4	2OT	New York Islanders	Nassau Veterans Memorial Coliseum	Recap
Al Iafrate (1) – pp – 03:22		First period		No scoring
Mike Ridley (1) – pp – 04:37; Al Iafrate (2) – 05:54		Second period		07:17 – pp – Vladimir Malakhov (1)
No scoring		Third period		12:54 – Travis Green (1); 14:14 – Patrick Flatley (1)
No scoring		Second overtime period		05:40 – Ray Ferraro (4)
Rick Tabaracci 42 saves / 46 shots		Goalie stats		Glenn Healy 37 saves / 40 shots

April 26	New York Islanders	4–6	Washington Capitals	Capital Centre	Recap
Ray Ferraro (5) – pp – 04:37		First period	01:15 – Sylvain Cote (1); 14:48 – pp – Al Iafrate (3); 16:41 – Al Iafrate (4)
No scoring		Second period	12:42 – Pat Elynuik (2)
Ray Ferraro (6) – 09:54; Ray Ferraro (7) – 14:22; Ray Ferraro (8) – 17:45		Third period	08:49 – Al Iafrate (5); 19:52 – pp – en – Dale Hunter (6)
Mark Fitzpatrick 12 saves / 14 shots Glenn Healy 8 saves / 11 shots		Goalie stats	Don Beaupre 28 saves / 32 shots

April 28	Washington Capitals	3–5	New York Islanders	Nassau Veterans Memorial Coliseum	Recap
Dale Hunter (7) – 09:58		First period	15:46 – Steve Thomas (3)
No scoring		Second period	02:41 – sh – Benoit Hogue (2); 19:46 – Brad Dalgarno (1)
Todd Krygier (1) – sh – 15:19; Al Iafrate (6) – pp – 16:30		Third period	09:58 – Travis Green (2); 11:29 – Pierre Turgeon (4)
Don Beaupre 28 saves / 33 shots		Goalie stats	Glenn Healy 23 saves / 26 shots

New York won series 4–2

=== Clarence Campbell Conference ===
==== (N1) Chicago Blackhawks vs. (N4) St. Louis Blues ====
This was the ninth playoff series meeting between these two teams, with Chicago previously winning seven of the prior eight playoff meetings. This was a rematch of the previous year's Norris Division Semifinals, which Chicago won in six games.

Although Chicago had entered the playoffs with the best record in the Campbell Conference and the third-best record in the entire NHL and the Blues had the lowest point total of any playoff team, the Blackhawks became the second division champion to get swept in the first round of the playoffs after the Bruins. On the series-winning overtime goal in game four, Chicago goaltender Ed Belfour complained that St. Louis star Brett Hull had interfered with him on the play, but to no avail, as the goal stood as the game and series winner. Belfour famously went on a rampage after the game, smashing his stick against the net, and breaking a hot tub, coffee maker and a television in the visitors' locker room at the St. Louis Arena. Belfour and Hull later became teammates on the Dallas Stars Stanley Cup winning team in 1999.

April 18	St. Louis Blues	4–3	Chicago Blackhawks	Chicago Stadium	Recap
No scoring		First period	08:17 – Brian Noonan (1)
Jeff Brown (1) – 03:12; Denny Felsner (1) – 12:49		Second period	05:40 – pp – Brian Noonan (2); 08:51 – Brian Noonan (3)
Brendan Shanahan (1) – pp – 11:12; Brett Hull (1) – pp – 11:29		Third period	No scoring
Curtis Joseph 24 saves / 27 shots		Goalie stats	Ed Belfour 23 saves / 27 shots

April 21	St. Louis Blues	2–0	Chicago Blackhawks	Chicago Stadium	Recap
Brett Hull (2) – pp – 07:38; Dave Lowry (1) – sh – 13:53		First period	No scoring
No scoring		Second period	No scoring
No scoring		Third period	No scoring
Curtis Joseph 47 saves / 47 shots		Goalie stats	Ed Belfour 15 saves / 17 shots

April 23	Chicago Blackhawks	0–3	St. Louis Blues	St. Louis Arena	Recap
No scoring		First period	16:53 – pp – Craig Janney (1)
No scoring		Second period	12:31 – Brett Hull (3)
No scoring		Third period	16:44 – Nelson Emerson (1)
Ed Belfour 21 saves / 24 shots		Goalie stats	Curtis Joseph 34 saves / 34 shots

April 25	Chicago Blackhawks	3–4	OT	St. Louis Blues	St. Louis Arena	Recap
No scoring		First period		16:09 – pp – Brett Hull (4)
Brent Sutter (1) – 03:09; Jocelyn Lemieux (1) – 16:40		Second period		No scoring
Jeremy Roenick (1) – 17:02		Third period		01:48 – pp – Brett Hull (5); 03:09 – pp – Brendan Shanahan (2)
No scoring		First overtime period		10:43 – Craig Janney (2)
Ed Belfour 25 saves / 29 shots		Goalie stats		Curtis Joseph 29 saves / 32 shots

St. Louis won series 4–0

==== (N2) Detroit Red Wings vs. (N3) Toronto Maple Leafs ====
This was the 23rd playoff series meeting between these two teams. Both teams split the prior 22 playoff meetings. Detroit won the most recent meeting in six games in the 1988 Norris Division Semifinals.

In a revival of the heated Original Six rivalry, Nikolai Borschevsky's game seven overtime goal gave Toronto the series and made them the sixth club to eliminate a team with a better regular season record in the first round of the playoffs. This was also Toronto's first playoff series win over Detroit since the Maple Leafs beat the Red Wings in the 1964 Stanley Cup Final. Until 2009, this was the last Clarence Campbell/Western Conference playoff series to be played entirely within the Eastern Time Zone.

April 19	Toronto Maple Leafs	3–6	Detroit Red Wings	Joe Louis Arena	Recap
John Cullen (1) – 10:44		First period	04:48 – Steve Yzerman (1)
Doug Gilmour (1) – pp – 19:59		Second period	05:04 – pp – Ray Sheppard (1); 06:42 – sh – Shawn Burr (1); 11:00 – pp – Steve Chiasson (1); 14:46 – Mark Howe (1)
Sylvain Lefebvre (1) – 07:45		Third period	05:10 – Yves Racine (1)
Felix Potvin 27 saves / 33 shots		Goalie stats	Tim Cheveldae 20 saves / 23 shots

April 21	Toronto Maple Leafs	2–6	Detroit Red Wings	Joe Louis Arena	Recap
No scoring		First period	04:06 – pp – Nicklas Lidstrom (1)
Dmitri Mironov (1) – pp – 19:10		Second period	00:43 – sh – Sergei Fedorov (1); 08:06 – pp – Steve Yzerman (2); 17:40 – Steve Yzerman (3)
Doug Gilmour (2) – 04:32		Third period	05:51 – Paul Ysebaert (1); 18:33 – Dallas Drake (1)
Felix Potvin 24 saves / 30 shots		Goalie stats	Tim Cheveldae 28 saves / 30 shots

April 23	Detroit Red Wings	2–4	Toronto Maple Leafs	Maple Leaf Gardens	Recap
No scoring		First period	04:21 – Dave Andreychuk (1); 07:37 – Dave Andreychuk (2)
Sergei Fedorov (2) – pp – 01:20		Second period	No scoring
Steve Chiasson (2) – 14:14		Third period	04:44 – pp – Wendel Clark (1); 09:32 – Rob Pearson (1)
Tim Cheveldae 29 saves / 33 shots		Goalie stats	Felix Potvin 34 saves / 36 shots

April 25	Detroit Red Wings	2–3	Toronto Maple Leafs	Maple Leaf Gardens	Recap
No scoring		First period	No scoring
Sheldon Kennedy (1) – 08:52; Paul Coffey (1) – 16:12		Second period	10:08 – Dave Andreychuk (3); 13:58 – Mark Osborne (1)
No scoring		Third period	04:47 – Dave Andreychuk (4)
Tim Cheveldae 25 saves / 28 shots		Goalie stats	Felix Potvin 27 saves / 29 shots

April 27	Toronto Maple Leafs	5–4	OT	Detroit Red Wings	Joe Louis Arena	Recap
Dave Andreychuk (5) – 08:26		First period		05:59 – Gerard Gallant (1); 18:00 – Sergei Fedorov (3)
Dave Ellett (1) – 09:12; Dave Ellett (2) – pp – 16:57		Second period		02:32 – pp – Ray Sheppard (2); 06:21 – Dino Ciccarelli (1)
Wendel Clark (2) – 11:38		Third period		No scoring
Mike Foligno (1) – 02:05		First overtime period		No scoring
Felix Potvin 26 saves / 30 shots		Goalie stats		Tim Cheveldae 16 saves / 21 shots

April 29	Detroit Red Wings	7–3	Toronto Maple Leafs	Maple Leaf Gardens	Recap
Dallas Drake (2) – pp – 08:37		First period	11:58 – Peter Zezel (1); 18:58 – Dave Andreychuk (6)
Dino Ciccarelli (2) – pp – 00:26; Paul Coffey (2) – 01:17; Paul Ysebaert (2) – sh – 08:36; Dino Ciccarelli (3) – pp – 14:26; Steve Yzerman (4) – sh – 19:49		Second period	No scoring
Dino Ciccarelli (4) – pp – 19:37		Third period	09:47 – Sylvain Lefebvre (2)
Tim Cheveldae 27 saves / 30 shots		Goalie stats	Felix Potvin 21 saves / 27 shots Daren Puppa 6 saves / 7 shots

May 1	Toronto Maple Leafs	4–3	OT	Detroit Red Wings	Joe Louis Arena	Recap
Glenn Anderson (1) – 07:25		First period		10:37 – Paul Ysebaert (3)
Bob Rouse (1) – 07:36		Second period		06:11 – Shawn Burr (2); 08:44 – Dallas Drake (3)
Doug Gilmour (3) – 17:17		Third period		No scoring
Nikolai Borschevsky (1) – 02:35		First overtime period		No scoring
Felix Potvin 24 saves / 27 shots		Goalie stats		Tim Cheveldae 31 saves / 35 shots

Toronto won series 4–3

==== (S1) Vancouver Canucks vs. (S4) Winnipeg Jets ====
This was the second overall playoff series between these two teams and was a rematch of last year's Smythe Division Semifinals, which Vancouver won in seven games.

Vancouver managed to defeat the Jets in six games and eliminate them in the first round for a second consecutive year. Game six was not without controversy as Greg Adams scored the first goal for the Canucks, however video replay showed the goal was clearly scored with a high-stick, the goal was allowed to stand. Adams went on to score the game winner in overtime and once again the goal was surrounded with controversy as video replay showed Adams crashing into the net and goalie Bob Essensa. This sent the puck into the net with the back of Essensa's skate. The goal also counted and Jet fans in attendance began to throw debris onto the ice in frustration with the call.

April 19	Winnipeg Jets	2–4	Vancouver Canucks	Pacific Coliseum	Recap
Thomas Steen (1) – pp – 17:53		First period	01:23 – pp – Greg Adams (1); 09:56 – Murray Craven (1)
No scoring		Second period	No scoring
Kris King (1) – 03:43		Third period	12:16 – Trevor Linden (1); 18:31 – Cliff Ronning (1)
Bob Essensa 29 saves / 33 shots		Goalie stats	Kirk McLean 20 saves / 22 shots

April 21	Winnipeg Jets	2–3	Vancouver Canucks	Pacific Coliseum	Recap
No scoring		First period	11:37 – Cliff Ronning (2)
Tie Domi (1) – 06:48		Second period	06:05 – Geoff Courtnall (1)
Teppo Numminen (1) – pp – 00:30		Third period	04:01 – Pavel Bure (1)
Bob Essensa 29 saves / 32 shots		Goalie stats	Kirk McLean 20 saves / 22 shots

April 23	Vancouver Canucks	4–5	Winnipeg Jets	Winnipeg Arena	Recap
Pavel Bure (2) – 18:29		First period	03:52 – Keith Tkachuk (1); 07:01 – pp – Teemu Selanne (1); 19:57 – pp – Teemu Selanne (2)
Trevor Linden (2) – 00:14; Trevor Linden (3) – pp – 00:59		Second period	No scoring
Pavel Bure (3) – 15:52		Third period	02:53 – sh – Luciano Borsato (1); 09:35 – Teemu Selanne (3)
Kirk McLean 24 saves / 29 shots		Goalie stats	Bob Essensa 33 saves / 37 shots

April 25	Vancouver Canucks	3–1	Winnipeg Jets	Winnipeg Arena	Recap
Greg Adams (2) – 02:16		First period	No scoring
Sergio Momesso (1) – 03:18		Second period	08:48 – Keith Tkachuk (2)
Dana Murzyn (1) – en – 18:45		Third period	No scoring
Kirk McLean 29 saves / 30 shots		Goalie stats	Bob Essensa 18 saves / 20 shots

April 27	Winnipeg Jets	4–3	OT	Vancouver Canucks	Pacific Coliseum	Recap
Darrin Shannon (1) – pp – 07:47		First period		11:10 – Gerald Diduck (1); 12:42 – Pavel Bure (4); 16:52 – pp – Greg Adams (3)
Keith Tkachuk (3) – pp – 11:46		Second period		No scoring
Darrin Shannon (2) – 09:05		Third period		No scoring
Teemu Selanne (4) – 06:18		First overtime period		No scoring
Bob Essensa 26 saves / 29 shots		Goalie stats		Kirk McLean 21 saves / 25 shots

April 29	Vancouver Canucks	4–3	OT	Winnipeg Jets	Winnipeg Arena	Recap
Greg Adams (4) – pp – 16:21		First period		02:55 – Stu Barnes (1)
Murray Craven (2) – 15:34		Second period		07:21 – Andy Brickley (1)
Sergio Momesso (2) – 07:09		Third period		06:03 – Keith Tkachuk (4)
Greg Adams (5) – 04:30		First overtime period		No scoring
Kirk McLean 23 saves / 26 shots		Goalie stats		Bob Essensa 28 saves / 32 shots

Vancouver won series 4–2

==== (S2) Calgary Flames vs. (S3) Los Angeles Kings ====
This was the sixth playoff series between these two teams. Los Angeles won three of the previous five meetings, including their most recent meeting in six games in the 1990 Smythe Division Semifinals.

The Kings upset the Flames in a high scoring six-game series. The winning team scored nine goals in three of the six games. Trailing two games to one and having lost two straight, Kings head coach Barry Melrose inserted backup goaltender Robb Stauber for the struggling Kelly Hrudey, who had allowed 17 goals against in 3 games. Stauber played brilliantly in the Kings 3–1 win in Game 4 as the series was tied at two wins apiece. The Kings offense was largely responsible for winning the series scoring nine goals in both Game 5 and 6.

April 18	Los Angeles Kings	6–3	Calgary Flames	Olympic Saddledome	Recap
Darryl Sydor (1) – 00:16		First period	No scoring
Jimmy Carson (1) – pp – 03:13; Charlie Huddy (1) – 03:37; Marty McSorley (1) – 06:36		Second period	02:48 – sh – Gary Suter (1)
Corey Millen (1) – 01:06; Jimmy Carson (2) – pp – 10:32		Third period	04:23 – Chris Dahlquist (1); 08:47 – Trent Yawney (1)
Kelly Hrudey 21 saves / 24 shots		Goalie stats	Mike Vernon 25 saves / 31 shots

April 21	Los Angeles Kings	4–9	Calgary Flames	Olympic Saddledome	Recap
Jimmy Carson (3) – 01:11		First period	No scoring
No scoring		Second period	05:02 – Joel Otto (1); 08:02 – Trent Yawney (2); 10:52 – pp – Robert Reichel (1); 16:47 – Joe Nieuwendyk (1); 19:37 – sh – Joel Otto (2)
Jimmy Carson (4) – 05:34; Warren Rychel (1) – 11:56; Jari Kurri (1) – pp – 15:22		Third period	07:23 – pp – Robert Reichel (2); 08:14 - Greg Paslawski (1); 10:37 – Theoren Fleury (1); 19:15 – Gary Suter (2)
Kelly Hrudey 31 saves / 40 shots		Goalie stats	Mike Vernon 27 saves / 31 shots

April 23	Calgary Flames	5–2	Los Angeles Kings	Great Western Forum	Recap
Joel Otto (3) – 16:59; Theoren Fleury (2) – pp – 17:26		First period	No scoring
Greg Paslawski (2) – 04:29		Second period	10:01 – Alexei Zhitnik (1)
Theo Fleury (3) – sh – 02:19; Joe Nieuwendyk (2) – en – 18:51		Third period	02:49 – Mike Donnelly (1)
Jeff Reese 22 saves / 24 shots		Goalie stats	Kelly Hrudey 25 saves / 29 shots

April 25	Calgary Flames	1–3	Los Angeles Kings	Great Western Forum	Recap
Trent Yawney (3) – pp – 13:43		First period	16:51 – pp – Alexei Zhitnik (2)
No scoring		Second period	04:48 – Warren Rychel (2)
No scoring		Third period	19:53 – en – Pat Conacher (1)
Jeff Reese 26 saves / 28 shots		Goalie stats	Robb Stauber 28 saves / 29 shots

April 27	Los Angeles Kings	9–4	Calgary Flames	Olympic Saddledome	Recap
Tomas Sandstrom (1) – 02:52; Mike Donnelly (2) – 14:30; Pat Conacher (2) – 17:07		First period	No scoring
Luc Robitaille (1) – 06:53; Luc Robitaille (2) – 10:59		Second period	11:51 – pp – Joe Nieuwendyk (3); 14:06 – Frantisek Musil (1)
Warren Rychel (3) – 04:38; Wayne Gretzky (1) – 07:33; Tony Granato (1) – 16:54; Pat Conacher (3) – 19:10		Third period	00:47 – Chris Dahlquist (2); 15:53 – pp – Theoren Fleury (4)
Robb Stauber 40 saves / 44 shots		Goalie stats	Jeff Reese 16 saves / 21 shots Mike Vernon 10 saves / 14 shots

April 29	Calgary Flames	6–9	Los Angeles Kings	Great Western Forum	Recap
Greg Paslawski (3) – 02:23; Gary Roberts (1) – pp – 11:21		First period	06:07 – pp – Wayne Gretzky (2); 18:45 – Tomas Sandstrom (2); 19:46 – Dave Taylor (1)
Theoren Fleury (5) – 06:57; Al MacInnis (1) – pp – 12:54; Joel Otto (4) – 19:41		Second period	04:25 – Jari Kurri (2); 15:00 – sh – Rob Blake (1); 16:03 – Tony Granato (2)
Chris Dahlquist (3) – 08:46		Third period	05:04 – Tomas Sandstrom (3); 09:56 – Corey Millen (2); 15:52 – Jimmy Carson (5)
Jeff Reese 10 saves / 18 shots Mike Vernon 4 saves / 5 shots		Goalie stats	Robb Stauber 36 saves / 42 shots

Los Angeles won series 4–2

== Division finals ==
=== Prince of Wales Conference ===
==== (A3) Montreal Canadiens vs. (A4) Buffalo Sabres ====
This was the sixth playoff series between these two teams. Montreal won three of the first five playoff meetings, including their most recent meeting in the 1991 Adams Division Semifinals in six games.

Montreal swept the series winning every game by a score of 4–3. A pivotal moment came in the second period of Game 3 when Sabres star Alexander Mogilny suffered a badly broken leg, ending what had been a tremendous campaign of 76 goals in 77 regular season games followed by seven goals in seven playoff games. As in their previous series, Montreal played three overtime games, this time winning all three of them.

This was the last time where a team who swept a playoff series in the first round was swept in the second round until the New York Islanders suffered the same fate in 2019.

May 2	Buffalo Sabres	3–4	Montreal Canadiens	Montreal Forum	Recap
Alexander Mogilny (7) – 03:43		First period	02:43 – pp – Benoit Brunet (2); 16:29 – pp – Kirk Muller (4)
Dale Hawerchuk (3) – pp – 09:12; Donald Audette (2) – 11:42		Second period	06:23 – Paul DiPietro (4)
No scoring		Third period	06:50 – Vincent Damphousse (4)
Grant Fuhr 18 saves / 22 shots		Goalie stats	Patrick Roy 32 saves / 35 shots

May 4	Buffalo Sabres	3–4	OT	Montreal Canadiens	Montreal Forum	Recap
Ken Sutton (1) – 02:37; Pat LaFontaine (2) – pp – 16:57		First period		02:09 – pp – Vincent Damphousse (5)
No scoring		Second period		03:59 – pp – Kirk Muller (5); 06:11 – Vincent Damphousse (6)
Doug Bodger (1) – pp – 00:44		Third period		No scoring
No scoring		First overtime period		02:50 – Guy Carbonneau (1)
Grant Fuhr 21 saves / 25 shots		Goalie stats		Patrick Roy 28 saves / 31 shots

May 6	Montreal Canadiens	4–3	OT	Buffalo Sabres	Buffalo Memorial Auditorium	Recap
Kirk Muller (6) – 00:14; Vincent Damphousse (7) – pp – 10:03		First period		No scoring
No scoring		Second period		13:43 – Ken Sutton (2); 15:56 – pp – Doug Bodger (2)
Guy Carbonneau (2) – sh – 01:49		Third period		10:20 – Dale Hawerchuk (4)
Gilbert Dionne (4) – 08:28		First overtime period		No scoring
Patrick Roy 33 saves / 36 shots		Goalie stats		Grant Fuhr 23 saves / 27 shots

May 8	Montreal Canadiens	4–3	OT	Buffalo Sabres	Buffalo Memorial Auditorium	Recap
Lyle Odelein (1) – 17:02		First period		14:15 – Ken Sutton (3)
Vincent Damphousse (8) – 06:29; Kevin Haller (1) – pp – 15:40		Second period		No scoring
No scoring		Third period		12:30 – pp – Dale Hawerchuk (5); 19:50 – Yuri Khmylev (4)
Kirk Muller (7) – 11:37		First overtime period		No scoring
Patrick Roy 37 saves / 40 shots		Goalie stats		Grant Fuhr 26 saves / 30 shots

Montreal won series 4–0

==== (P1) Pittsburgh Penguins vs. (P3) New York Islanders ====
This was the third playoff series between these two teams. New York won both previous playoff meetings, including their most recent in the 1982 Patrick Division Semifinals 3–2.

The Islanders upset the two-time defending Stanley Cup champions. David Volek's overtime goal in game seven was the deciding goal as New York rallied from a 3–2 deficit to defeat the Penguins. Islanders defenceman Darius Kasparaitis played a large role in his team's win neutralizing Pittsburgh stars Mario Lemieux and Jaromir Jagr with big hits. With their upset of Pittsburgh, the Islanders reached the Wales Conference Finals for the first time since 1984. The Islanders did not win a playoff series again until 2016.

May 2	New York Islanders	3–2	Pittsburgh Penguins	Civic Arena	Recap
Vladimir Malakhov (2) – 12:20; Ray Ferraro (9) – sh – 17:09		First period	08:19 – Mike Needham (1)
Benoit Hogue (3) – sh – 05:02		Second period	15:10 – Jeff Daniels (3)
No scoring		Third period	No scoring
Glenn Healy 28 saves / 30 shots		Goalie stats	Tom Barrasso 28 saves / 31 shots

May 4	New York Islanders	0–3	Pittsburgh Penguins	Civic Arena	Recap
No scoring		First period	04:37 – Joe Mullen (2)
No scoring		Second period	No scoring
No scoring		Third period	00:38 – Rick Tocchet (4); 06:40 – Ron Francis (3)
Glenn Healy 22 saves / 25 shots		Goalie stats	Tom Barrasso 26 saves / 26 shots

May 6	Pittsburgh Penguins	3–1	New York Islanders	Nassau Veterans Memorial Coliseum	Recap
Ron Francis (4) – 13:08; Jaromir Jagr (3) – 15:45		First period	No scoring
No scoring		Second period	02:18 – pp – Ray Ferraro (10)
Joe Mullen (3) – en – 19:22		Third period	No scoring
Tom Barrasso 36 saves / 37 shots		Goalie stats	Glenn Healy 26 saves / 28 shots

May 8	Pittsburgh Penguins	5–6	New York Islanders	Nassau Veterans Memorial Coliseum	Recap
No scoring		First period	No scoring
Jaromir Jagr (4) – 13:12		Second period	15:44 – pp – Ray Ferraro (11); 19:43 – sh – Tom Fitzgerald (1)
Troy Loney (1) – 02:32; Rick Tocchet (5) – 02:53; Kevin Stevens (3) – pp – 06:24; Ron Francis (5) – 10:50		Third period	00:25 – sh – Tom Fitzgerald (2); 03:31 – Derek King (1); 09:11 – Vladimir Malakhov (3); 12:11 – Derek King (2)
Tom Barrasso 34 saves / 40 shots		Goalie stats	Glenn Healy 23 saves / 28 shots

May 10	New York Islanders	3–6	Pittsburgh Penguins	Civic Arena	Recap
No scoring		First period	00:19 – Mario Lemieux (6); 00:54 – Rick Tocchet (6); 01:48 – pp – Larry Murphy (2)
Jeff Norton (1) – pp – 00:31; Brian Mullen (2) – 17:23		Second period	00:45 – pp – Mario Lemieux (7)
Travis Green (3) – 13:45		Third period	01:39 – sh – Joe Mullen (4); 05:30 – Jaromir Jagr (5)
Glenn Healy 11 saves / 16 shots Mark Fitzpatrick 1 save / 2 shots		Goalie stats	Tom Barrasso 34 saves / 37 shots

May 12	Pittsburgh Penguins	5–7	New York Islanders	Nassau Veterans Memorial Coliseum	Recap
Martin Straka (1) – 06:47		First period	00:25 – Brad Dalgarno (2); 07:19 – Derek King (3)
Mario Lemieux (8) – 01:16; Martin Straka (2) – 12:22; Kevin Stevens (4) – pp – 14:31		Second period	07:22 – pp – Ray Ferraro (12); 11:20 – pp – Steve Thomas (4)
Kevin Stevens (5) – pp – 17:28		Third period	05:42 – Brian Mullen (3); 10:32 – Steve Thomas (5); 19:42 – en – Uwe Krupp (1)
Tom Barrasso 22 saves / 28 shots		Goalie stats	Glenn Healy 31 saves / 36 shots

May 14	New York Islanders	4–3	OT	Pittsburgh Penguins	Civic Arena	Recap
No scoring		First period		No scoring
Steve Thomas (6) – 18:28		Second period		07:59 – Ulf Samuelsson (1)
David Volek (1) – 06:10; Benoit Hogue (4) – 09:09		Third period		16:13 – Ron Francis (6); 19:00 – Rick Tocchet (7)
David Volek (2) – 05:16		First overtime period		No scoring
Glenn Healy 42 saves / 45 shots		Goalie stats		Tom Barrasso 16 saves / 20 shots

New York won series 4–3

=== Clarence Campbell Conference ===
==== (N3) Toronto Maple Leafs vs. (N4) St. Louis Blues ====
This was the fourth playoff series meeting between these two teams. St. Louis won two of the previous three meetings. Their most recent meeting occurred in the 1990 Norris Division Semifinals, which St. Louis won in five games.

Toronto defeated St. Louis in seven games to advance to a league semifinal series for the first time since 1978, despite Blues' goaltender Curtis Joseph's best efforts. St. Louis was heavily outshot throughout the series including more than 60 shots in game one alone. Game 7 of the series was the first Game 7 to be played at Maple Leaf Gardens since game seven of the 1964 Stanley Cup Final.

May 3	St. Louis Blues	1–2	2OT	Toronto Maple Leafs	Maple Leaf Gardens	Recap
No scoring		First period		19:03 – pp – John Cullen (2)
Philippe Bozon (1) – 10:55		Second period		No scoring
No scoring		Third period		No scoring
No scoring		Second overtime period		03:16 – Doug Gilmour (4)
Curtis Joseph 61 saves / 63 shots Guy Hebert 1 save / 1 shots		Goalie stats		Felix Potvin 33 saves / 34 shots

May 5	St. Louis Blues	2–1	2OT	Toronto Maple Leafs	Maple Leaf Gardens	Recap
Brett Hull (6) – 08:30		First period		13:09 – pp – Doug Gilmour (5)
No scoring		Second period		No scoring
No scoring		Third period		No scoring
Jeff Brown (2) – 03:03		Second overtime period		No scoring
Curtis Joseph 57 saves / 58 shots		Goalie stats		Felix Potvin 38 saves / 40 shots

May 7	Toronto Maple Leafs	3–4	St. Louis Blues	St. Louis Arena	Recap
Dave Andreychuk (7) – 04:30; Dave Ellett (3) – pp – 14:33		First period	15:09 – Brett Hull (7)
No scoring		Second period	04:42 – Brendan Shanahan (3); 14:47 – Brendan Shanahan (4)
Mike Krushelnyski (1) – 06:05		Third period	09:24 – Garth Butcher (1)
Felix Potvin 29 saves / 33 shots		Goalie stats	Curtis Joseph 34 saves / 37 shots

May 9	Toronto Maple Leafs	4–1	St. Louis Blues	St. Louis Arena	Recap
Wendel Clark (3) – 02:58		First period	14:59 – pp – Denny Felsner (2)
Dave Andreychuk (8) – pp – 16:25		Second period	No scoring
Todd Gill (1) – 12:55; Peter Zezel (2) – en – 19:16		Third period	No scoring
Felix Potvin 27 saves / 28 shots		Goalie stats	Curtis Joseph 31 saves / 34 shots

May 11	St. Louis Blues	1–5	Toronto Maple Leafs	Maple Leaf Gardens	Recap
Brett Hull (8) – pp – 09:29		First period	06:18 – pp – Dave Andreychuk (9); 18:17 – pp – Bob Rouse (2)
No scoring		Second period	04:38 – Dave Andreychuk (10); 11:11 – Nikolai Borschevsky (2)
No scoring		Third period	12:35 – Glenn Anderson (2)
Curtis Joseph 24 saves / 29 shots		Goalie stats	Felix Potvin 25 saves / 26 shots

May 13	Toronto Maple Leafs	1–2	St. Louis Blues	St. Louis Arena	Recap
Dave Andreychuk (11) – pp – 01:53		First period	No scoring
No scoring		Second period	No scoring
No scoring		Third period	03:33 – Dave Lowry (2); 08:14 – pp – Jeff Brown (3)
Felix Potvin 25 saves / 27 shots		Goalie stats	Curtis Joseph 40 saves / 41 shots

May 15	St. Louis Blues	0–6	Toronto Maple Leafs	Maple Leaf Gardens	Recap
No scoring		First period	05:02 – pp – Dave Andreychuk (12); 10:02 – Wendel Clark (4); 15:12 – Mike Krushelnyski (2); 19:40 – Wendel Clark (5)
No scoring		Second period	10:58 – Kent Manderville (1); 14:50 – Doug Gilmour (6)
No scoring		Third period	No scoring
Curtis Joseph 30 saves / 36 shots		Goalie stats	Felix Potvin 25 saves / 25 shots

Toronto won series 4–3

==== (S1) Vancouver Canucks vs. (S3) Los Angeles Kings ====
This was the third playoff series between these two teams. Both teams split their first two playoff meetings. Their most recent meeting occurred in the 1991 Smythe Division Semifinals, which Los Angeles won in six games.

This was the first Smythe Division Final since 1982 not to have either the Calgary Flames or the Edmonton Oilers. The Vancouver Canucks, who easily won the regular season Smythe Division title, were strong favourites over the Kings. Vancouver's 5–2 win in Game 1 did nothing to change that. Kings head coach Barry Melrose re-inserted Kelly Hrudey as the Kings' starting goaltender in Game 2 and he responded with a strong effort as the Kings evened the series with a 6–3 win. After the teams split the two games in Los Angeles, they headed back to Vancouver for the crucial Game 5. Kings forward Gary Shuchuk scored on a rebound during a goal mouth scramble late in the second overtime and the Kings skated off the ice in front of a stunned Vancouver home crowd with a 3–2 series lead. Back in Los Angeles for Game 6, the Canucks did not recover as the Kings jumped out to a 5–2 lead and won the series despite a late Canuck goal.

This was the only time during this era (1982–1993) that a Canadian team did not advance to the Conference Final representing the Smythe Division.

May 2	Los Angeles Kings	2–5	Vancouver Canucks	Pacific Coliseum	Recap
Mike Donnelly (3) – 07:02		First period	05:22 – pp – Dixon Ward (1); 13:45 – Dana Murzyn (2); 19:44 – pp – Geoff Courtnall (2)
Wayne Gretzky (3) – pp – 03:10		Second period	12:50 – Gerald Diduck (2)
No scoring		Third period	09:48 – Dave Babych (1)
Robb Stauber 37 saves / 42 shots		Goalie stats	Kirk McLean 25 saves / 27 shots

May 5	Los Angeles Kings	6–3	Vancouver Canucks	Pacific Coliseum	Recap
Mark Hardy (1) – 00:19; Jari Kurri (3) – sh – 07:01; Warren Rychel (4) – 10:30		First period	00:52 – pp – Greg Adams (6); 13:12 – pp – Dixon Ward (2)
Tony Granato (3) – 02:01; Wayne Gretzky (4) – 17:39		Second period	11:45 – Pavel Bure (5)
Pat Conacher (4) – 04:55		Third period	No scoring
Kelly Hrudey 26 saves / 29 shots		Goalie stats	Kirk McLean 25 saves / 31 shots

May 7	Vancouver Canucks	4–7	Los Angeles Kings	Great Western Forum	Recap
No scoring		First period	No scoring
Geoff Courtnall (3) – 15:54; Anatoli Semenov (1) – 17:56		Second period	12:24 – pp – Darryl Sydor (2); 19:09 – Warren Rychel (5)
Dave Babych (2) – pp – 11:18; Sergio Momesso (3) – 18:56		Third period	04:41 – Luc Robitaille (3); 06:46 – Jari Kurri (4); 09:03 – Wayne Gretzky (5); 12:13 – Tomas Sandstrom (4); 19:59 – en – Wayne Gretzky (6)
Kirk McLean 26 saves / 32 shots		Goalie stats	Kelly Hrudey 33 saves / 37 shots

May 9	Vancouver Canucks	7–2	Los Angeles Kings	Great Western Forum	Recap
Dana Murzyn (3) – 11:09		First period	15:49 – pp – Tomas Sandstrom (5)
Petr Nedved (1) – 03:08; Murray Craven (3) – 10:06; Gerald Diduck (3) – 13:21; Geoff Courtnall (4) – 18:25		Second period	00:27 – pp – Luc Robitaille (4)
Jim Sandlak (1) – 02:18; Greg Adams (7) – pp – 17:05		Third period	No scoring
Kirk McLean 29 saves / 31 shots		Goalie stats	Kelly Hrudey 28 saves / 35 shots

May 11	Los Angeles Kings	4–3	2OT	Vancouver Canucks	Pacific Coliseum	Recap
Wayne Gretzky (7) – 06:22; Jari Kurri (5) – 08:15		First period		05:50 – pp – Murray Craven (4)
Luc Robitaille (5) – 08:57		Second period		00:47 – Petr Nedved (2); 13:40 – pp – Trevor Linden (4)
No scoring		Third period		No scoring
Gary Shuchuk – 06:31		Second overtime period		No scoring
Kelly Hrudey 36 saves / 39 shots		Goalie stats		Kirk McLean 40 saves / 44 shots

May 13	Vancouver Canucks	3–5	Los Angeles Kings	Great Western Forum	Recap
No scoring		First period	07:22 – Rob Blake (2)
Gerald Diduck (4) – 08:46; Jim Sandlak (2) – 11:38		Second period	15:48 – pp – Jari Kurri (6); 16:05 – pp – Tomas Sandstrom (6); 17:44 – Warren Rychel (6)
Trevor Linden (5) – 17:05		Third period	08:54 – Wayne Gretzky (8)
Kirk McLean 45 saves / 50 shots		Goalie stats	Kelly Hrudey 25 saves / 28 shots

Los Angeles won series 4–2

== Conference finals ==
All four conference finalists finished third in their respective divisions during the season.

=== Prince of Wales Conference final ===
==== (A3) Montreal Canadiens vs. (P3) New York Islanders ====
This was the fourth playoff series between these two teams. Montreal won two of the previous three meetings. New York won the most recent meeting in the 1984 Wales Conference Finals in six games.

Montreal's win in Game 3 was their 11th straight, tying the single-playoff record set a year earlier by Pittsburgh and Chicago, but it was not without controversy, as referees missed Montreal having too many men on the ice on the game-winning goal. Montreal added two more overtime victories during the series bringing their total to seven straight for the playoffs.

May 16	New York Islanders	1–4	Montreal Canadiens	Montreal Forum	Recap
No scoring		First period	10:18 – Gilbert Dionne (5)
No scoring		Second period	03:41 – John LeClair (1); 14:45 – pp – Brian Bellows (3)
Ray Ferraro (13) – 18:53		Third period	12:06 – John LeClair (2)
Glenn Healy 18 saves / 21 shots Mark Fitzpatrick 6 saves / 7 shots		Goalie stats	Patrick Roy 20 saves / 21 shots

May 18	New York Islanders	3–4	2OT	Montreal Canadiens	Montreal Forum	Recap
Pierre Turgeon (5) – pp – 13:41		First period		No scoring
No scoring		Second period		05:40 – Brian Bellows (4); 09:49 – Stephan Lebeau (1)
Steve Thomas (7) – 10:35; David Volek (3) – 12:41		Third period		14:50 – Paul DiPietro (5)
No scoring		Second overtime period		06:21 – Stephan Lebeau (2)
Glenn Healy 37 saves / 41 shots		Goalie stats		Patrick Roy 39 saves / 42 shots

May 20	Montreal Canadiens	2–1	OT	New York Islanders	Nassau Veterans Memorial Coliseum	Recap
No scoring		First period		No scoring
No scoring		Second period		01:36 – Pierre Turgeon (6)
Vincent Damphousse (9) – 14:46		Third period		No scoring
Guy Carbonneau (3) – 12:34		First overtime period		No scoring
Patrick Roy 31 saves / 32 shots		Goalie stats		Glenn Healy 21 saves / 23 shots

May 22	Montreal Canadiens	1–4	New York Islanders	Nassau Veterans Memorial Coliseum	Recap
No scoring		First period	No scoring
Paul DiPietro (6) – 06:22		Second period	13:14 – Steve Thomas (8)
No scoring		Third period	05:57 – Patrick Flatley (2); 10:24 – David Volek (4); 19:16 – en – Benoit Hogue (5)
Patrick Roy 21 saves / 24 shots		Goalie stats	Glenn Healy 23 saves / 24 shots

May 24	New York Islanders	2–5	Montreal Canadiens	Montreal Forum	Recap
No scoring		First period	00:58 – Kirk Muller (8); 17:11 – Mike Keane (2)
Steve Thomas (9) – 15:54		Second period	01:58 – Vincent Damphousse (10); 15:02 – J. J. Daigneault (1); 15:11 – Brian Bellows (5)
Benoit Hogue (6) – 03:46		Third period	No scoring
Glenn Healy 28 saves / 33 shots		Goalie stats	Patrick Roy 26 saves / 28 shots

Montreal won series 4–1

=== Clarence Campbell Conference final ===
==== (N3) Toronto Maple Leafs vs. (S3) Los Angeles Kings ====
This was the third playoff series meeting between these two teams. Toronto won both previous meetings, including their most recent meeting in a two-game sweep in the 1978 Preliminary Round. This was the first conference final for both teams since the playoffs went to a conference format starting in 1982. Toronto last played a semifinal series in 1978; they were swept by Montreal. Los Angeles last played in such a series in 1969; they were swept by St. Louis. For the first time since 1982, this series did not have either the Calgary Flames or the Edmonton Oilers representing the Smythe Division, and it was the only one between then and 1994 not to feature a team from Western Canada.

During Game 1, Los Angeles defenceman Marty McSorley delivered a serious, open-ice hit on Toronto's Doug Gilmour. Leafs captain Wendel Clark took exception to the hit and went after McSorley for striking their star player. Toronto head coach Pat Burns tried scaling the bench to confront Los Angeles head coach Barry Melrose. After the game, McSorley claimed in the interviews he received dozens of threats on his hotel phone from angry fans. For their part, the Kings believed Gilmour had attempted to head-butt McSorley in retaliation, which would have made Gilmour subject to a game misconduct and a five-minute major penalty, had the butt been called. However, referee Don Koharski declined to do so.

The bad blood between the Kings and Gilmour traced back to the game of November 22, 1992, when Gilmour broke the left arm of Kings forward Tomas Sandstrom with a slash, drawing an eight-day suspension and sidelining Sandstrom for over a month. The fires of the feud were fanned by Hockey Night in Canada studio analyst Don Cherry, who heaped abuse on Melrose throughout the telecast, criticizing everything from his playing style to his haircut, and claimed Sandstrom had "deserved" to have his arm broken, for being a "ChickenSwede". Later, in a post-game interview, Cherry kissed Gilmour, further angering the Kings.

Toronto took a 3–2 series lead heading into Game 6 in Los Angeles, which would ultimately become one of the most controversial in NHL history. With the game tied at four in overtime, Wayne Gretzky high-sticked Gilmour in the face, cutting his chin open. As with the alleged head-butt in Game 1, high sticking penalties that resulted in a cut at that time resulted in a five-minute major penalty and a game misconduct on the play. However, Gretzky was not penalized by referee Kerry Fraser and went on to score the winning goal moments later evening the series at three games each. The events of the game overshadowed Wendell Clark scoring a hat-trick, including the game-tying goal with 82 seconds left to force overtime.

In Game 7, Gretzky scored a hat-trick and added an assist to give the Kings another 5–4 win and the first Stanley Cup Final berth in team history. Gretzky later called Game 7 of the 1993 Campbell Conference Finals the greatest game he had ever played. This was Los Angeles’ last conference championship until 2012.

To date, this remains the closest the Maple Leafs have come to winning a Stanley Cup (five wins away) since their last title in 1967. This was the last meeting between teams from Toronto and Los Angeles in the postseason until the 2025 World Series.

May 17	Los Angeles Kings	1–4	Toronto Maple Leafs	Maple Leaf Gardens	Recap
No scoring		First period	17:19 – Doug Gilmour (7)
Pat Conacher (5) – 14:59		Second period	No scoring
No scoring		Third period	09:49 – Glenn Anderson (3); 10:55 – Doug Gilmour (8); 15:21 – Bill Berg (1)
Kelly Hrudey 43 saves / 47 shots		Goalie stats	Felix Potvin 28 saves / 29 shots

May 19	Los Angeles Kings	3–2	Toronto Maple Leafs	Maple Leaf Gardens	Recap
Mike Donnelly (4) – 02:56		First period	02:25 – pp – Doug Gilmour (9); 03:59 – Glenn Anderson (4)
Tony Granato (4) – pp – 13:00		Second period	No scoring
Tomas Sandstrom (7) – 12:20		Third period	No scoring
Kelly Hrudey 27 saves / 29 shots		Goalie stats	Felix Potvin 25 saves / 28 shots

May 21	Toronto Maple Leafs	2–4	Los Angeles Kings	Great Western Forum	Recap
No scoring		First period	08:49 – Rob Blake (3)
Doug Gilmour (10) – pp – 15:15; Ken Baumgartner (1) – 17:04		Second period	09:26 – sh – Jari Kurri (7); 18:18 – pp – Alexei Zhitnik (3)
No scoring		Third period	01:26 – sh – Dave Taylor (2)
Felix Potvin 21 saves / 25 shots		Goalie stats	Kelly Hrudey 20 saves / 22 shots

May 23	Toronto Maple Leafs	4–2	Los Angeles Kings	Great Western Forum	Recap
Bob Rouse (3) – 02:30; Mike Eastwood (1) – 06:24; Mike Foligno (2) – pp – 14:52		First period	12:22 – pp – Wayne Gretzky (9)
Rob Pearson (2) – 02:34		Second period	No scoring
No scoring		Third period	10:59 – pp – Rob Blake (4)
Felix Potvin 23 saves / 25 shots		Goalie stats	Kelly Hrudey 21 saves / 25 shots

May 25	Los Angeles Kings	2–3	OT	Toronto Maple Leafs	Maple Leaf Gardens	Recap
No scoring		First period		No scoring
Gary Shuchuk (2) – 01:53; Jari Kurri (8) – 14:15		Second period		16:11 – pp – Mike Krushelnyski (3)
No scoring		Third period		08:43 – Sylvain Lefebvre (3)
No scoring		First overtime period		19:20 – Glenn Anderson (5)
Kelly Hrudey 31 saves / 34 shots		Goalie stats		Felix Potvin 41 saves / 43 shots

May 27	Toronto Maple Leafs	4–5	OT	Los Angeles Kings	Great Western Forum	Recap
Glenn Anderson (6) – 00:57		First period		10:32 – Tony Granato (5)
Wendel Clark (6) – 03:57		Second period		08:00 – pp – Marty McSorley (2); 10:22 – pp – Darryl Sydor (3); 16:27 – pp – Luc Robitaille (6)
Wendel Clark (7) – 11:08; Wendel Clark (8) – 18:39		Third period		No scoring
No scoring		First overtime period		01:41 – pp – Wayne Gretzky (10)
Felix Potvin 30 saves / 35 shots		Goalie stats		Kelly Hrudey 28 saves / 32 shots

May 29	Los Angeles Kings	5–4	Toronto Maple Leafs	Maple Leaf Gardens	Recap
Wayne Gretzky (11) – sh – 09:48; Tomas Sandstrom (8) – 17:30		First period	No scoring
Wayne Gretzky (12) – 10:20		Second period	01:25 – pp – Wendel Clark (9); 07:36 – Glenn Anderson (7)
Mike Donnelly (5) – 16:09; Wayne Gretzky (13) – 16:46		Third period	01:25 – Wendel Clark (10); 18:53 – Dave Ellett (4)
Kelly Hrudey 25 saves / 29 shots		Goalie stats	Felix Potvin 21 saves / 26 shots

Los Angeles won series 4–3

== Stanley Cup Final ==
This was the first and only playoff series between these two teams. The Canadiens had not won a Stanley Cup since 1986. This was the thirty-fourth Finals appearance for Montreal, while Los Angeles made their first ever appearance in the Finals. This was Wayne Gretzky's only appearance in the Finals with the Kings, and the last of his career. Patrick Roy won the Conn Smythe Trophy for the playoffs' MVP. This was the last Finals appearance for Montreal until 2021. This is the most recent time a Canadian team has won the Stanley Cup.

June 1	Los Angeles Kings	4–1	Montreal Canadiens	Montreal Forum	Recap
Luc Robitaille (7) – pp – 03:03		First period	18:09 – Ed Ronan (2)
Luc Robitaille (8) – pp – 17:41		Second period	No scoring
Jari Kurri (9) – 01:51; Wayne Gretzky (14) – en – 18:04		Third period	No scoring
Kelly Hrudey 31 saves / 32 shots		Goalie stats	Patrick Roy 34 saves / 37 shots

June 3	Los Angeles Kings	2–3	OT	Montreal Canadiens	Montreal Forum	Recap
No scoring		First period		18:31 – Eric Desjardins (2)
Dave Taylor (3) – sh – 05:12		Second period		No scoring
Pat Conacher (6) – 08:32		Third period		18:47 – pp – Eric Desjardins (3)
No scoring		First overtime period		00:51 – Eric Desjardins (4)
Kelly Hrudey 38 saves / 41 shots		Goalie stats		Patrick Roy 22 saves / 24 shots

June 5	Montreal Canadiens	4–3	OT	Los Angeles Kings	Great Western Forum	Recap
Brian Bellows (6) – pp – 10:26		First period		No scoring
Gilbert Dionne (6) – 02:41; Mathieu Schneider (1) – 03:02		Second period		07:52 – Luc Robitaille (9); 11:02 – Tony Granato (6); 17:07 – Wayne Gretzky (15)
No scoring		Third period		No scoring
John LeClair (3) – 00:34		First overtime period		No scoring
Patrick Roy 30 saves / 33 shots		Goalie stats		Kelly Hrudey 32 saves / 36 shots

June 7	Montreal Canadiens	3–2	OT	Los Angeles Kings	Great Western Forum	Recap
Kirk Muller (9) – 10:57		First period		No scoring
Vincent Damphousse (11) – pp – 05:24		Second period		06:33 – Mike Donnelly (6); 19:55 – pp – Marty McSorley (3)
No scoring		Third period		No scoring
John LeClair (4) – 14:37		First overtime period		No scoring
Patrick Roy 40 saves / 42 shots		Goalie stats		Kelly Hrudey 36 saves / 39 shots

June 9	Los Angeles Kings	1–4	Montreal Canadiens	Montreal Forum	Recap
No scoring		First period	15:10 – Paul DiPietro (7)
Marty McSorley (4) – 02:40		Second period	03:51 – Kirk Muller (10); 11:31 – pp – Stephan Lebeau (3)
No scoring		Third period	12:06 – Paul DiPietro (8)
Kelly Hrudey 25 saves / 29 shots		Goalie stats	Patrick Roy 18 saves / 19 shots

Montreal won series 4–1

== Playoff statistics ==
=== Skaters ===
These are the top ten skaters based on points.

Player	Team	GP	G	A	Pts	+/–	PIM
Wayne Gretzky	Los Angeles Kings	24	15	25	40	+6	4
Doug Gilmour	Toronto Maple Leafs	21	10	25	35	+16	30
Tomas Sandstrom	Los Angeles Kings	24	8	17	25	-2	12
Vincent Damphousse	Montreal Canadiens	20	11	12	23	+8	16
Luc Robitaille	Los Angeles Kings	24	9	13	22	-13	28
Ray Ferraro	New York Islanders	18	13	7	20	+5	18
Wendel Clark	Toronto Maple Leafs	21	10	10	20	+15	51
Dave Andreychuk	Toronto Maple Leafs	21	12	7	19	+6	35
Mario Lemieux	Pittsburgh Penguins	11	8	10	18	+2	10
Glenn Anderson	Toronto Maple Leafs	21	7	11	18	+7	31

=== Goaltenders ===
This is a combined table of the top five goaltenders based on goals against average and the top five goaltenders based on save percentage, with at least 420 minutes played. The table is sorted by GAA, and the criteria for inclusion are bolded.

Player	Team	GP	W	L	SA	GA	GAA	SV%	SO	TOI
Patrick Roy	Montreal Canadiens	20	16	4	647	46	**2.13**	**.929**	0	1293:01
Curtis Joseph	St. Louis Blues	11	7	4	438	27	**2.27**	**.938**	2	714:35
Felix Potvin	Toronto Maple Leafs	21	11	10	636	62	**2.84**	**.903**	1	1307:53
Tom Barrasso	Pittsburgh Penguins	12	7	5	370	35	**2.91**	**.905**	2	721:41
Glenn Healy	New York Islanders	18	9	8	524	59	**3.19**	**.887**	0	1109:06

== See also ==
- List of Stanley Cup champions

Preceded by 1992 Stanley Cup playoffs	Stanley Cup playoffs	Succeeded by 1994 Stanley Cup playoffs
