= Pierre Turgeon =

Canadian ice hockey player (born 1969)

- Hockey Hall of Fame, 2023
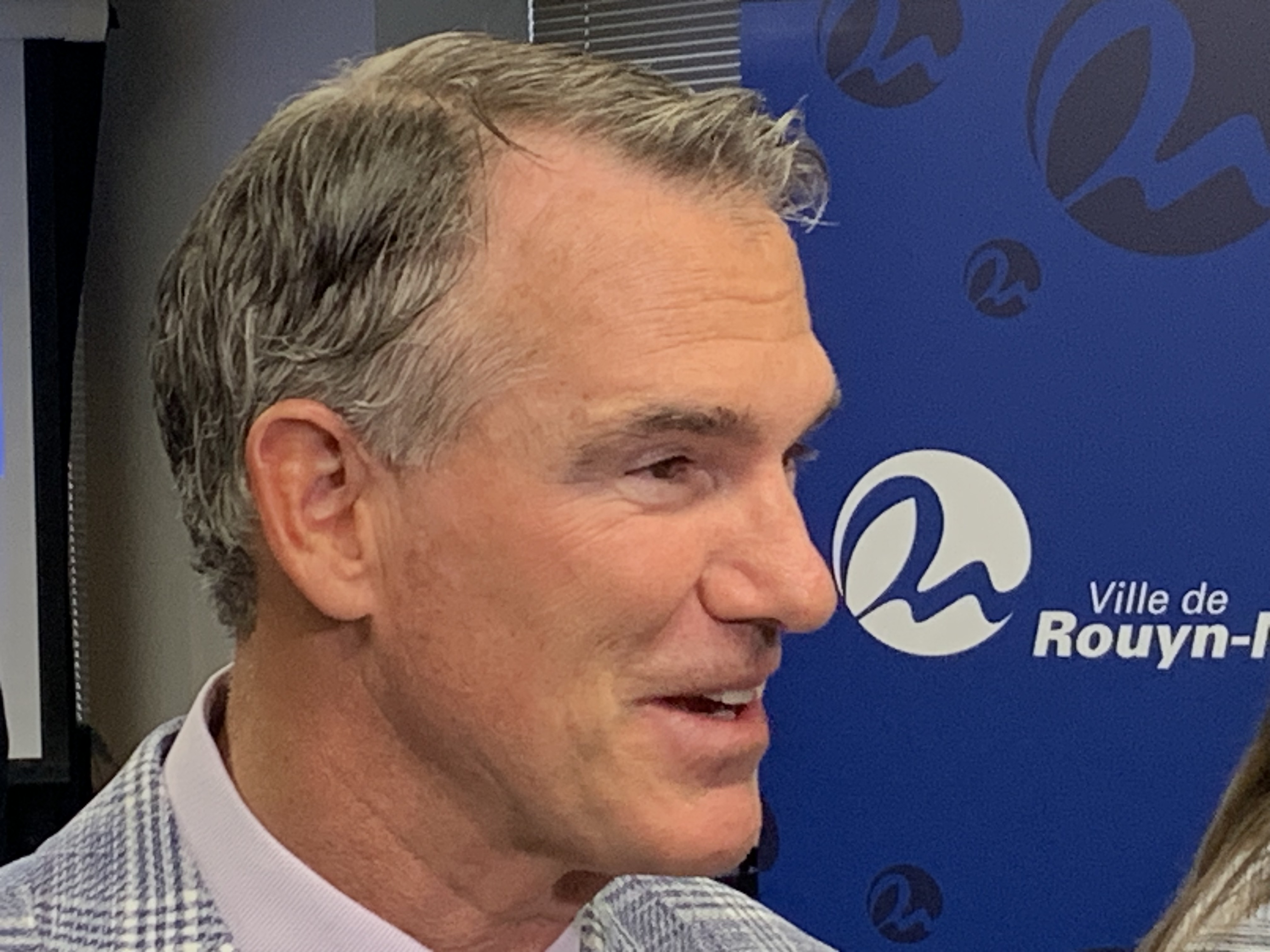
- Turgeon in 2023
- Born: August 28, 1969 (age 57) Rouyn-Noranda, Quebec, Canada
- Height: 6 ft 1 in (185 cm)
- Weight: 199 lb (90 kg; 14 st 3 lb)
- Position: Centre
- Shot: Left
- Played for: Buffalo Sabres; New York Islanders; Montreal Canadiens; St. Louis Blues; Dallas Stars; Colorado Avalanche
- NHL draft: 1st overall, 1987; Buffalo Sabres
- Playing career: 1987–2007

Pierre Julien Turgeon (TUHR-zhawn, French pronunciation: [tyʁ.ʒɔ̃]; born August 28, 1969) is a Canadian professional ice hockey coach and former player. Selected first overall by the Buffalo Sabres in the 1987 NHL entry draft, Turgeon played in the NHL for the Sabres, New York Islanders, Montreal Canadiens, St. Louis Blues, Dallas Stars and Colorado Avalanche. He is the younger brother of former NHL player Sylvain Turgeon.

A productive scorer that utilized the ice over nineteen seasons, Turgeon recorded thirteen consecutive 20-goal seasons from 1988 to 2001 and recorded over 500 goals and 800 assists in over 1,200 games as a player. He was awarded the Lady Byng Memorial Trophy for his sportsmanship in 1993 and was named to the NHL All-Star Game on five occasions. He was the 34th player to have scored 500 goals, doing so in 2005. Turgeon was inducted into the Hockey Hall of Fame on November 13, 2023.

== Early life ==
Turgeon was born in Rouyn-Noranda, Quebec.

Turgeon represented Canada in the Little League World Series in 1982 for his hometown along with future NHLer Stéphane Matteau; at 11 years old, Turgeon was already 5'11 and 185 pounds. Turgeon served as pitcher as the team advanced to the semifinals, where they faced Taiwan, which had won 30 straight games. Five outs away from the championship game, Taiwan rallied and defeated Canada 10-7. In 2007, Turgeon was inducted into the Peter J. McGovern Little League Museum's Hall of Excellence as the first Canadian and first NHLer to be inducted (with his subsequent induction into the Hockey Hall of Fame, Turgeon became the first and so far only member of both the Hall of Excellence and the Hockey Hall of Fame). While Turgeon gave up baseball at the age of 14, he noted his fond pride at having played in the Little League World Series, which saw thousands of people greeting the team when they arrived back to Canada.

Following in the footsteps of his older brother Sylvain, Turgeon played for the midget hockey team Bourassa Angevins in the 1984–85 season. He was the league's top scorer among 15-year-old players with 49 goals and 52 assists. In 1985, Turgeon was selected as the first overall pick by the Granby Bisons in the 1985 Entry Draft of the Quebec Major Junior Hockey League. In his first season, he won the Michel Bergeron Trophy for best offensive play for a rookie. His second season saw him win the Michael Bossy Trophy, as awarded to the player judged to be the best professional prospect. With 69 goals and 85 assists in 58 games, he helped the Bisons win the Jean Rougeau Trophy for the best regular season record in the league. In 127 career games for the Bisons, he scored 116 goals with 152 assists for 268 total points for an average of over two points per game. He was inducted into the QMJHL Hall of Fame in 2008.

Turgeon was a member of Canada's team that was involved in the "Punch-up in Piestany", a bench-clearing brawl between Canada and the Soviet Union during the final game of the 1987 World Junior Ice Hockey Championships in Piešťany, Czechoslovakia (now Slovakia) on January 4, 1987. He was the only Canadian who did not initially leave the bench until Canadian head coach Bert Templeton convinced him to go on the ice. Many of his teammates never forgave Turgeon for failing to defend his teammates. In the words of Everett Sanipass: "I'm looking for someone to help (Stéphane) Roy out and I look over at the bench. There's this dog Turgeon, just sitting there, with his head down. He wouldn't get his ass off the bench ... just sitting there when everyone's off the Soviet bench and at least one of our guys is in real trouble getting double-teamed." Regarding not leaving the bench, Turgeon stated in 2017: "that wasn't my job. I didn't have to fight." Two other players for Canada in forward Steve Nemeth and goalie Jimmy Waite also did not throw a punch. Turgeon was one of numerous players that wound up being stars in the National Hockey League, which included Sergei Fedorov, Alexander Mogilny, and Brendan Shanahan, with each later being inducted into the Hockey Hall of Fame.

In the lead-up up to the 1987 draft in the fall of 1986, he was speculated to be a "sure bet" to be a first-round pick. He was described by staff member (and former NHLer) André Boudrias of the Montreal Canadiens as "a mix of Wayne Gretzky and Jean Ratelle" with how he could beat a player with his intelligence. While Turgeon was with the Bisons, he stayed with Glen Brislan and his family in their home on the outskirts of Granby while finishing high school and learning to speak further in English.

== Playing career ==
=== Buffalo Sabres ===
Turgeon with the Buffalo Sabres

Leading up to the 1987 NHL entry draft, Turgeon was confident that he would be selected as the first overall pick, with the league's Central Scouting Bureau ranking him as the number one prospect, ahead of Brendan Shanahan. On June 13, he was selected as the first overall pick by the Buffalo Sabres, the first overall pick selected by the team since Gilbert Perreault in 1970 (the Devils, with the second pick, picked Shanahan). Turgeon was the fourth QMJHL player to be selected first overall in the draft. With the prior selection of his brother Sylvain as the second pick in the 1983 draft, the Turgeons became the highest drafted siblings in NHL history. Rick Jeanneret, play-by-play announcer for the Sabres, coined the phrase "Ooh-la-la Pierre" for Turgeon. On October 21, 1987, he scored his first NHL goal against the Hartford Whalers.

Turgeon would quickly make an impact with the Sabres once he arrived. In his rookie season, he contributed a respectable 42 points (14 goals, 28 assists) during the 1987–88 season, helping the Sabres reach the Stanley Cup playoffs for the first time in three years. In his first postseason appearance as a player, he recorded four goals and three assists as the Sabres were eliminated in six games in the first round.

His production increased to 88 points (34 goals and 54 assists) for the 1988–89 season as he quickly became a fan favourite. In the 1989–90 season, he became a star by scoring 106 points (40 goals and 66 assists) and playing in the 1990 NHL All-Star Game. He was only the fourth Sabre to record a 100-point season in team history. Turgeon's production dipped a little bit in the 1990–91 season to 79 points (32 goals and 47 assists), but he was still a solid performer. Playoff success eluded the Sabres in Turgeon's time with the team, as they were eliminated in the first round each time that he played with them. In eight games played in the 1991–92 season, he led the team in scoring with two goals and six assists for Buffalo before being traded.

=== New York Islanders ===
On October 25, 1991, after playing just eight games for the Sabres into the 1991–92 season, Turgeon was traded (along with Benoît Hogue, Uwe Krupp and Dave McLlwain) to the New York Islanders in exchange for Pat LaFontaine, Randy Wood, Randy Hillier and future considerations. Turgeon excelled with the Islanders as the season moved along, which saw him record a point in eighteen consecutive games (January 11 to February 22, 1992) with seventeen goals and assists each; his point streak ranks third for an Islander and no player has matched him since. In 77 total games, Turgeon had 40 goals with 55 assists for 95 total points.

Turgeon's best season as an Islander came with the 1992–93 season, where he scored 58 goals and 132 points, both being career highs. He recorded a point in 70 games, a mark eclipsed by only eleven other players for a single season. His 132 points rank as third-highest in team history for a season and he ranks as the last Islander to record 100 points in a season and last Islander to record 50 goals in a season. He helped lead the Islanders to a magical run in the 1993 Stanley Cup playoffs, which notably saw the team upset the two-time defending champion Pittsburgh Penguins. The first round series, which the Islanders won in six games over the Washington Capitals, is infamous for an on-ice incident. After scoring a goal to put the Islanders up 5-1 during game six at Nassau Coliseum, Turgeon was checked from behind by Dale Hunter of the Capitals as he celebrated his goal. Turgeon suffered a separated shoulder and missed the first six games of the ensuing series against the Penguins. Hunter received a then-record 21-game suspension the next season for the hit. Turgeon was surprised about the attack by Hunter, who called him three days later and apparently told Turgeon that he "didn't even see that I scored". Prior to Game 7, Turgeon told head coach Al Arbour to dress him for the game, stating that while he was not good to play, he just wanted to be on the bench. When the game went into double-overtime, Arbour asked if Turgeon could handle a shift, which he responded by saying yes; not too long afterwards, the Islanders pulled off the upset with a goal by David Volek. In the Conference Finals against the Montreal Canadiens, Turgeon missed Game 1 but tallied five points in four games as Montreal (who won two of the games in overtime) defeated the Islanders in five games before winning the Stanley Cup later that month. Turgeon did not hold a grudge against Hunter, even wishing him well when Hunter was hired as head coach of the Washington Capitals in 2011.

On June 17, 1993, Turgeon was awarded the Lady Byng Memorial Trophy for his "best type of sportsmanship and gentlemanly conduct combined with a high standard of playing ability", doing so over fellow finalists Adam Oates and Pat LaFontaine. He recorded 38 goals with 56 assists in the 1993–94 season for the Islanders that saw him named to the All-Star Game and finish third in voting for the Byng Trophy. He closed his Islander career with the team being swept in four games that saw him log one assist.

In 255 regular season games for the Islanders, Turgeon recorded 340 points.

Islanders teammate Steve Thomas was once quoted as stating, “Pierre is different from most superstars. He doesn’t know how good he is, so when I have the chance, I remind him.” General manager Bill Torrey remarked no regret at the move to acquire Turgeon, stating, "Pierre was a pleasure to watch, whether you were looking for a big goal or for someone -- meaning him -- to set up a key score. I was glad we were able to get him when we did. I had to give up talent to get talent but the important thing was that the time had come for me to change the team's look."

=== Montreal Canadiens ===
Following the 1994–95 NHL lockout in which the 1994–95 season was limited to 48 games. With the Islanders having won just ten of its first 34 games, general manager Don Maloney (in a move speculated to try and keep his job), decided to rebuild the team, which included trading Turgeon and Vladimir Malakhov to the Montreal Canadiens in exchange for Kirk Muller, Mathieu Schneider and Craig Darby at the trading deadline on April 5, 1995. Reportedly, Canadiens GM Serge Savard made the move for Turgeon when plans to acquire Joe Nieuwendyk from the Calgary Flames did not work out (as it turned out, Nieuwendyk, a future Hall of Fame member himself, was traded the following season, albeit not to Montreal). Savard hoped that the trade would help the play of Vincent Damphousse and Mark Recchi. In his first fifteen games, Turgeon had eleven goals and nine assists (with his first game seeing him score the tying goal and assisting the game-winner against Quebec) but the Canadiens finished a mere 18–23–7 and missed the Stanley Cup playoffs.

Four games into the 1995–96 season, with the Canadiens winless, Savard and head coach Jacques Demers were fired by the team. Réjean Houle was hired to be the general manager while Mario Tremblay was hired to coach the team and the latter immediately came into conflict with star player Patrick Roy, and Turgeon sensed that it was not going to work out between the two of them in an instant, particularly since he was Roy's neighbour that drove with him to the rink each day.

On December 8, 1995, two days after the Canadiens traded Roy and team captain Mike Keane to the Colorado Avalanche, Turgeon was named captain of the team. Turgeon responded with 38 goals (leading the team) and 58 assists in 80 games that saw Montreal win 40 games and saw Turgeon play in the 1996 NHL All-Star Game. One of Turgeon's fondest memories as a player came in March 1996 when he served as a key part of the ceremony for the transition of the home venue of the team, which played its last game at the Montreal Forum on March 11. He received a ceremonial torch passed on from previous captains and on March 16 for the debut at the Molsen Centre, he touched the flame to the team logo at centre ice. The playoffs did not go as well for the Canadiens or Turgeon (described by one news outlet as a "quiet, introspective" player), whose play was scrutinized during the first round series against the New York Rangers to the point where fans were heard booing him. Ultimately he had just two goals and four assists as the Canadiens lost the series. His 96 points were second most by a Canadiens player in the 1990s and no Canadiens player recorded more points in a season for the next 30 years.

In the following 1996–97 season, Turgeon was relegated to the third line at centre behind Saku Koivu and Damphousse and had conflicts with head coach Tremblay that saw Turgeon record one goal with ten assists in nine games. He requested a trade, believing that he still had plenty of good years ahead of him as a 27-year-old while Houle felt the team needed to get tougher and went along with trading Turgeon. In 104 total games in Montreal, Turgeon had 127 total points.

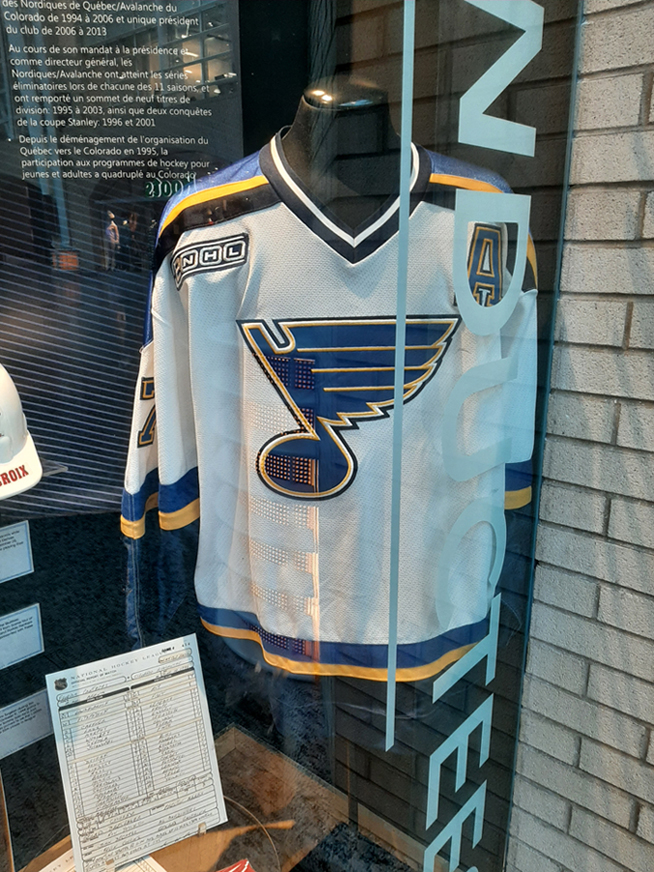
A Blues jersey worn by Turgeon during the 1999–00 season, including an October 9, 1999 game in Edmonton against the Oilers where Turgeon recorded the 1,000th point of his 13-year NHL career, becoming just the 55th player in league history to reach the milestone.

=== St. Louis Blues ===
On October 29, 1996, Turgeon was traded to the St. Louis Blues (along with Rory Fitzpatrick and Craig Conroy) in exchange for Murray Baron, Shayne Corson and a fifth-round pick in the 1997 NHL entry draft. In 78 total games for Montreal and St. Louis, Turgeon had 26 goals and 59 assists for 85 points. In the playoffs, Turgeon had a goal and an assist as the Blues lost to the Detroit Red Wings in five games.

Turgeon spent the next five seasons producing well with the likes of Brett Hull, Chris Pronger, Al MacInnis and Grant Fuhr as teammates. In August 1998, he went through arbitration and received $4.65 million, which set a new record for the highest arbitration award given to a player at the time. In 67 games of the 1998–99 season, he had 31 goals with 34 assists for a total of 65 points. With 997 career points prior to turning 30 years old, he finished three points shy of reaching 1,000 career points, which would've made him one of a select group of players to record 1,000 career points in their prior to their thirties. In the first round of the 1999 Stanley Cup playoffs, he scored the game-winning goal in overtime of Game 7 to help the Blues defeat the Phoenix Coyotes and overcome a 3–1 series deficit; Turgeon was the last Blue to score a game-winning goal in Game 7 of a playoff series until 2016. He scored the game-winning goal in Game 4 in the second-round matchup against the Dallas Stars. The Blues were eliminated by the Stars, with Turgeon finishing as the team leader in goals with four and 13 total points.

On July 14, 1999, he signed a two-year deal for $5 million each season to make him the highest-paid Blues player at the time of the 1999–2000 season. On October 9, 1999, Turgeon became the 55th player with 1,000 career points, doing so with a goal against the Edmonton Oilers; he did so in his 881st NHL game and at the time he was the 13th youngest player to record 1,000 career points. Four days later on October 13, against the Detroit Red Wings, he scored his 400th career goal, becoming the 53rd player to reach the mark. He recorded 26 goals with 40 assists for 66 points in 52 games, which saw him record a 15-game point streak from December 1999 to January 2000, which was the second-longest point streak in his career.

In the 2000–01 season, which proved to be his final season with the team, he recorded 30 goals and 52 assists, which made only the 18th player to record thirteen consecutive 20-goal seasons in NHL history. The team reached the Western Conference Finals for the first time since 1986 as the Blues lost to the Colorado Avalanche in five games; he recorded five goals and ten assists for the playoff run.

Ultimately, he averaged more than 70 points per season with the Blues in his tenure; in 327 total games, he scored 134 goals with 221 assists for 355 total points.

=== Dallas Stars and Colorado Avalanche ===
On July 1, 2001, Turgeon joined the Dallas Stars as a free agent to a five-year contract (with a no-trade clause) worth $25.5 million. The move had been done when the team failed to acquire Jeremy Roenick and John LeClair on the market. Put on a team with two famed centres in Mike Modano and Joe Nieuwendyk, Turgeon was tasked to play on the wing as opposed to playing as the key centre that saw him play with less of a role on offense, and he had just 47 points in 66 games of the 2001–02 season. He was waived in May 2003 but returned to the Stars. In the 2003–04 season, he had 15 goals and assists each in 76 games that saw him become the 37th player with 1,200 career points. The 2004–05 NHL lockout saw Turgeon miss the entire year along with instituting a new collective bargaining agreement, with owners having the chance to buy players out at a discounted percentage of a contract that would not count against the salary cap (which for Turgeon would be $2.97 million), and he was waived by the Stars in July 2005.

Turgeon, alongside Patrice Brisebois, were signed by the Colorado Avalanche as a free agent on August 3, 2005 to help deal with the recent departures of Peter Forsberg and Adam Foote, signing for $1.5 million. Upon signing with the Avalanche, Turgeon switched his jersey number to #87 from his customary #77, as the number was retired by Colorado for Ray Bourque. In his only full season with Colorado, he recorded 16 goals and 30 assists for 46 points. On November 8, 2005, Turgeon became the 34th player in NHL history to score 500 goals, doing so against the San Jose Sharks at the Pepsi Center. In the postseason, he had two assists in five games. The 2006–07 season saw Turgeon limited to just seventeen games due to calf and groin injuries; he scored four goals with three assists.

On September 5, 2007, Turgeon announced his retirement from the NHL.

== Legacy ==
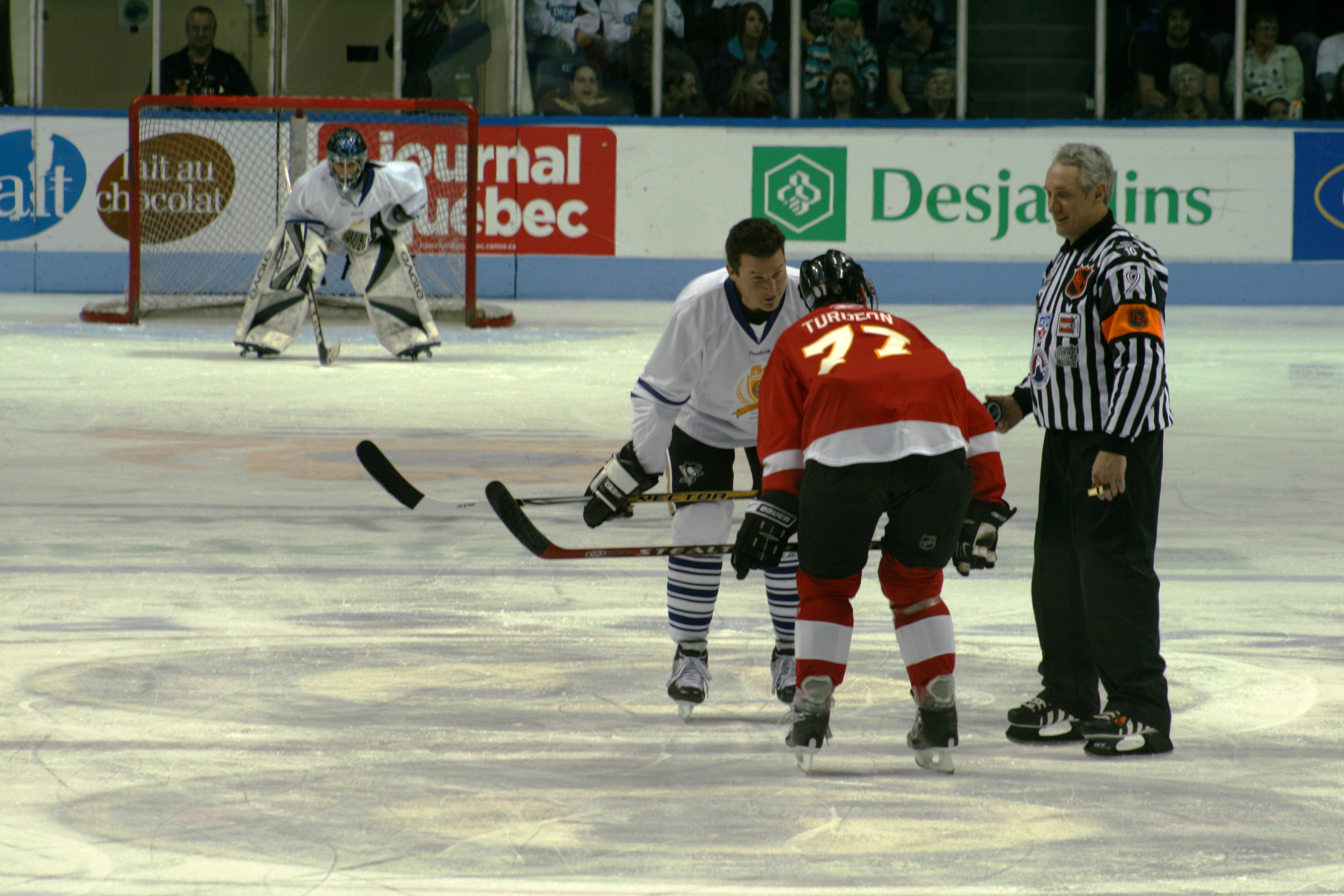
Turgeon and Mario Lemieux in a faceoff in 2009

When Turgeon retired in 2007, he did so as one of only 17 players with 500 goals and 800 assists in NHL history. He finished as one of 33 players to have played 1,000 games and average a point a game, finishing with an average of 1.03.

Turgeon was first considered for the Hockey Hall of Fame in 2010 but was not selected, with his snub in 2020 being noted by The Denver Post, which quoted Hockey Hall of Famer Michel Goulet as describing Turgeon as "the best player on his team for 12 to 14 straight years". He was one of five eligible players with 500 goals (Peter Bondra, Jeremy Roenick, Keith Tkachuk, Pat Verbeek) not inducted into the Hall.

On June 21, 2023, after thirteen years of being eligible, Turgeon was selected for the Hockey Hall of Fame. He was formally inducted on November 13, with his Sabre teammate Tom Barrasso also being inducted that same day. One day later, Turgeon was on hand at the Bell Centre for his induction into the Montreal Canadiens Ring of Honour.

Turgeon became the tenth player that had been selected as the first overall NHL draft pick to be enshrined in the Hall of Fame (alongside Dale Hawerchuk, Guy Lafleur, Mario Lemieux, Eric Lindros, Mike Modano, Gilbert Perreault, Denis Potvin, Mats Sundin, and Joe Thornton). Teammate and broadcaster Ray Ferraro described Turgeon as a special player that looked at the ice surface as if it was a "chessboard" that could see plays before they happened and used it to find space on the ice to make his next play. Turgeon noted his appreciation of the teams and players he worked with over the years and noted his pride at receiving a Hall of Fame ring, stating:

It’s nice just to see they’re recognizing your career, recognizing what you’ve done when you were young. It takes a lot of hard work to get there. Working out, training, you’re eating well, all this. And then on top of it, you play with incredible players who helped you to be better, so you’re thankful for these guys.

== Coaching career ==
In the summer of 2017, Luc Robitaille, a friend of Turgeon and president of the Los Angeles Kings, invited Turgeon to the team development camp and liked what he saw from Turgeon in communicating to the players of his hockey knowledge to where Robitaille and head coach John Stevens created a position for Turgeon to serve under.

On July 10, 2017, Turgeon was named as the offensive coordinator of the Kings. On June 8, 2018, the Kings announced that they had accepted Turgeon's resignation to leave the organization due to family reasons. In 2025, he became coach of the Buffalo team in the three-on-three professional league 3ICE.

== Personal life ==
Turgeon and his wife Elisabeth have four children and currently live in Cherry Hills Village, Colorado. One of their children, Elizabeth, died in a car accident on December 23, 2010, near Vaughn, New Mexico, at age 18. Turgeon's son Dominic was drafted 63rd overall by the Detroit Red Wings in the 2014 NHL entry draft. His daughter, Valérie Turgeon, was a forward for Harvard Crimson women's ice hockey team, playing for two seasons.

== In popular culture ==
George W. Strawbridge, Jr., an active shareholder of the Buffalo Sabres and director and member of the team's executive committee for more than 30 years, named one of his thoroughbred racehorses in Pierre Turgeon's honor. Turgeon raced for Strawbridge's racing stable in France where he won several conditions races and, after retiring, is developing into a successful sire.

== Career statistics ==
=== Regular season and playoffs ===
			Regular season					Playoffs
Season	Team	League	GP	G	A	Pts	PIM	GP	G	A	Pts	PIM
1984–85	Bourassa Angevins	QMAAA	41	49	52	101	26	5	3	8	11	2
1985–86	Granby Bisons	QMJHL	69	47	67	114	31	—	—	—	—	—
1985–86	Canada	Intl	11	2	4	6	2	—	—	—	—	—
1986–87	Granby Bisons	QMJHL	58	69	85	154	8	7	9	6	15	15
1987–88	Buffalo Sabres	NHL	76	14	28	42	34	6	4	3	7	4
1988–89	Buffalo Sabres	NHL	80	34	54	88	26	5	3	5	8	2
1989–90	Buffalo Sabres	NHL	80	40	66	106	29	6	2	4	6	2
1990–91	Buffalo Sabres	NHL	78	32	47	79	26	6	3	1	4	6
1991–92	Buffalo Sabres	NHL	8	2	6	8	4	—	—	—	—	—
1991–92	New York Islanders	NHL	69	38	49	87	16	—	—	—	—	—
1992–93	New York Islanders	NHL	83	58	74	132	26	11	6	7	13	0
1993–94	New York Islanders	NHL	69	38	56	94	18	4	0	1	1	0
1994–95	New York Islanders	NHL	34	13	14	27	10	—	—	—	—	—
1994–95	Montreal Canadiens	NHL	15	11	9	20	4	—	—	—	—	—
1995–96	Montreal Canadiens	NHL	80	38	58	96	44	6	2	4	6	2
1996–97	Montreal Canadiens	NHL	9	1	10	11	2	—	—	—	—	—
1996–97	St. Louis Blues	NHL	69	25	49	74	12	5	1	1	2	2
1997–98	St. Louis Blues	NHL	60	22	46	68	24	10	4	4	8	2
1998–99	St. Louis Blues	NHL	67	31	34	65	36	13	4	9	13	6
1999–2000	St. Louis Blues	NHL	52	26	40	66	8	7	0	7	7	0
2000–01	St. Louis Blues	NHL	79	30	52	82	37	15	5	10	15	2
2001–02	Dallas Stars	NHL	66	15	32	47	16	—	—	—	—	—
2002–03	Dallas Stars	NHL	65	12	30	42	18	5	0	1	1	0
2003–04	Dallas Stars	NHL	76	15	25	40	20	5	1	3	4	2
2005–06	Colorado Avalanche	NHL	62	16	30	46	32	5	0	2	2	6
2006–07	Colorado Avalanche	NHL	17	4	3	7	10	—	—	—	—	—
NHL totals			1,294	515	812	1,327	452	109	35	62	97	36

=== International ===
Year	Team	Event	Result	GP	G	A	Pts	PIM
1987	Canada	WJC	DSQ	6	3	0	3	2
Junior totals				6	3	0	3	2

== Awards and honours ==
Award	Year
QMJHL
Michel Bergeron Trophy	1986
Mike Bossy Trophy	1987
NHL
All-Star Game	1990, 1993, 1994, 1996, 2000
Lady Byng Memorial Trophy	1993

== See also ==
- List of NHL statistical leaders
- Notable families in the NHL
- List of NHL players with 1,000 points
- List of NHL players with 500 goals
- List of NHL players with 1,000 games played

Awards and achievements
Preceded by Joe Murphy	NHL first overall draft pick 1987	Succeeded by Mike Modano
Preceded by Shawn Anderson	Buffalo Sabres first-round draft pick 1987	Succeeded by Joel Savage
Preceded by Wayne Gretzky	Winner of the Lady Byng Memorial Trophy; 1993	Succeeded by Wayne Gretzky
Sporting positions
Preceded by Mike Keane	Montreal Canadiens captain 1995–96	Succeeded by Vincent Damphousse
