= Vincent Damphousse =

Canadian ice hockey player (born 1967)

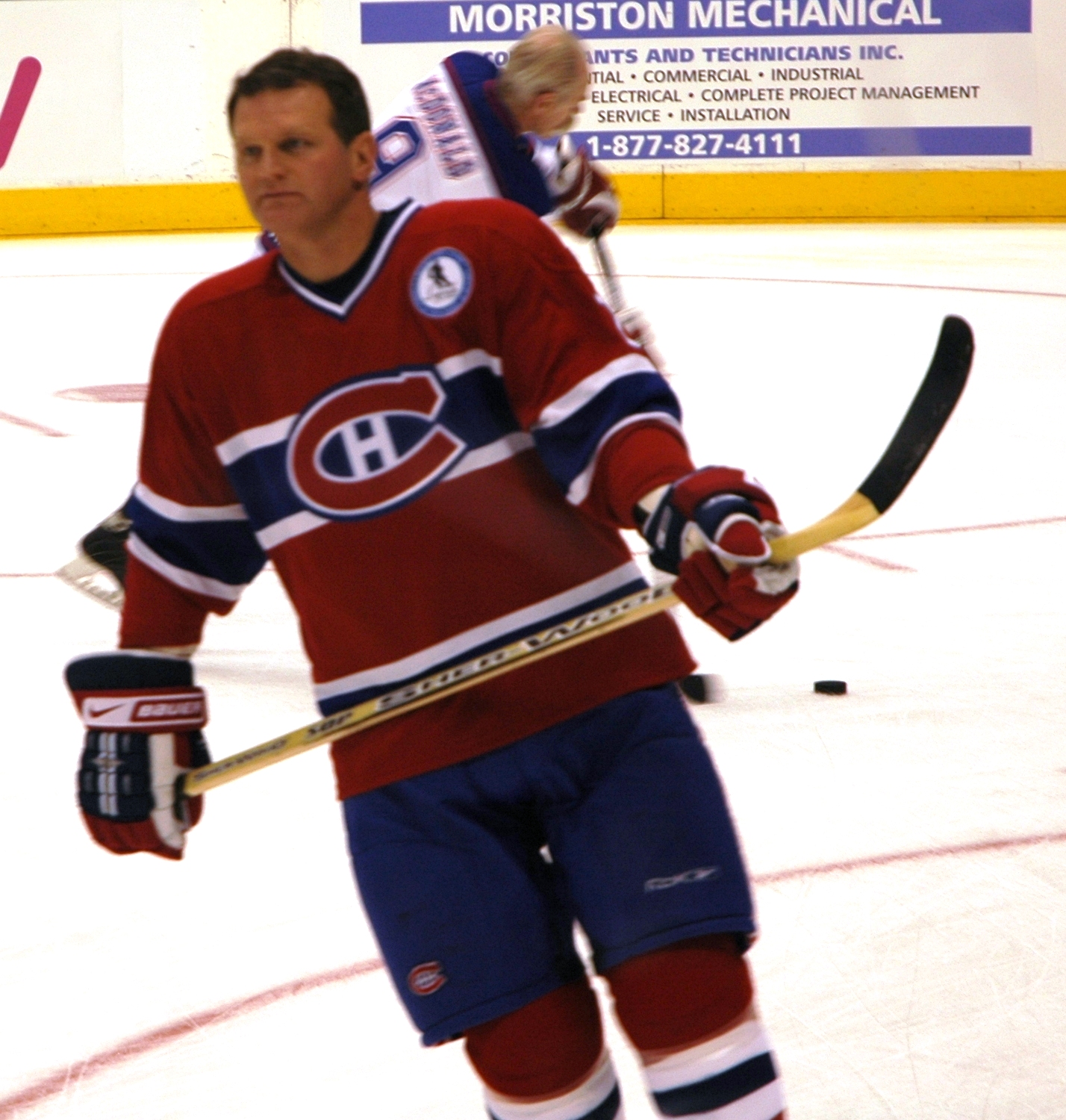
- Damphousse in 2008
- Born: December 17, 1967 (age 58) Montreal, Quebec, Canada
- Height: 6 ft 1 in (185 cm)
- Weight: 205 lb (93 kg; 14 st 9 lb)
- Position: Centre
- Shot: Left
- Played for: Toronto Maple Leafs; Edmonton Oilers; Montreal Canadiens; San Jose Sharks
- National team: Canada
- NHL draft: 6th overall, 1986; Toronto Maple Leafs
- Playing career: 1986–2004

Vincent François Damphousse (DAM-fus; born December 17, 1967) is a Canadian former professional hockey player who played in the National Hockey League (NHL) for 18 seasons. He primarily played centre for the Toronto Maple Leafs, Edmonton Oilers, Montreal Canadiens, and San Jose Sharks.

Damphousse played junior hockey with the Laval Voisins/Titan and was drafted as the sixth overall pick by the Toronto Maple Leafs in 1986. Debuting in the NHL at nineteen in the 1986–87 season, he recorded 46 points in 80 games. In five seasons with Toronto, he had three 20-goal seasons before he was included as part of a trade to the Edmonton Oilers in September 1991 and was traded again the following year to the Montreal Canadiens, where he had his most success. He recorded 23 points in 20 games of the 1993 Stanley Cup playoffs as the Canadiens won the Stanley Cup Final for Damphousse's only championship. He recorded his only 40-goal season in the 1993–94 campaign. In March 1999, the team traded him to the San Jose Sharks for a couple of draft picks. He recorded his 1,000th career point in the 2000–01 season. After six years in San Jose, he signed a free agency deal with the Colorado Avalanche before the 2004–05 NHL lockout cancelled the season. In 2005, he announced his retirement; he recorded over 400 goals and 700 assists in 1,378 games.

As of 2013, Damphousse is a hockey analyst with the French language television network RDS in his native Quebec.

== Early life ==
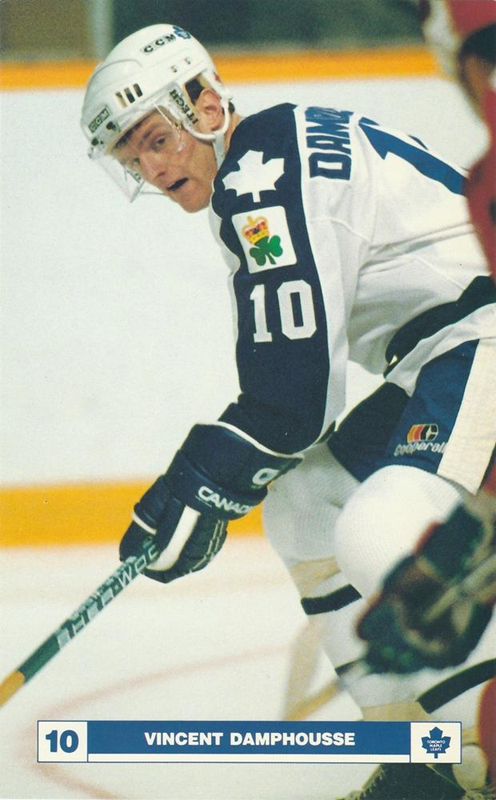
Damphousse with the Toronto Maple Leafs in 1987

Damphousse played three seasons in the Quebec Major Junior Hockey League with the Laval Voisins (who later became the Laval Titan). In his rookie season, they won the President's Cup for the first time ever; he did not record a statistic in the Memorial Cup. He recorded back-to-back 100-point seasons and was named a QMJHL Second Team All-Star at the end of the 1985–86 season. In 2011, he was inducted into the Quebec Major Junior Hockey League Hall of Fame; he had been ranked 10th in scoring among all QMJHL alumni who played in the NHL at the time.

== Playing career ==
Damphousse was drafted by the Toronto Maple Leafs as the 6th overall pick in the 1986 NHL entry draft, a fact that excited him as the first French-Canadian drafted by the Leafs in the first round. He led his draft class in goals and points for a career. In the 1989–90 season, he had 33 goals and 61 assists for a 94-point season. His 61 assists was the most by a winger for over 20 years before he was passed by Mitch Marner in the 2018–19 season.

In 1991 he was named MVP of the NHL All Star Game, being one of only four players (at that time) to ever score four goals in a single All-Star matchup. Damphousse spent five seasons in Toronto before being traded to the Edmonton Oilers in 1991 in a deal that sent future Hall of Famers Grant Fuhr and Glenn Anderson to Toronto, while Edmonton received Damphousse, Peter Ing, Luke Richardson, Scott Thornton, cash, and future considerations in return; Damphousse had recorded 118 goals and 211 assists for 329 total points in 394 games. Oilers' general manager Glen Sather said of Damphousse at that time that among French-Canadian players, only Mario Lemieux was more skilled offensively.

Damphousse led the team in scoring that season with 89 points; he was later offered only $700,000 by the Oilers to re-sign with them. Sather contended that Damphousse did not want to come back to the team due to having problems with his wife and said he offered $2.1 million over three years. On August 27, 1992, with free agency looming, the Oilers traded Damphousse (and a 4th round pick in the 1993 NHL entry draft) to the Montreal Canadiens in exchange for Shayne Corson, Brent Gilchrist and Vladimir Vujtek. He recorded 97 points (39 goals and 58 assists) during the regular season. In the 1993 Stanley Cup playoffs, he had 11 goals and 12 assists (which included the go-ahead goal in the series-clinching Game 5 of the Conference Finals); he had one goal and three assists in the Stanley Cup Final as the Canadiens won in five games to give Damphousse his only Stanley Cup championship. His 97 points were the most by a Canadiens player in the 1990s and no Montreal player would record more points in a season until Nick Suzuki in the 2025–26 season. In the following 1993–94 season, he recorded 40 goals with 51 assists. No Canadien player would score 40 goals in a season for the next 30 years. He spent six more seasons in Montreal. In the fall of 1996, prior to the 1996–97 season, Damphousse was selected to play for Team Canada for the World Cup of Hockey as an injury replacement; Canada lost in the final to the American team.

In the 1998–99 season, Damphousse was in the final season of his contract and sensed that his days in Montreal (where he wanted to finish his career) would be over soon. On March 23, 1999, he was traded to the San Jose Sharks for three draft picks (1st, 2nd, 5th). He recorded 13 points in his first 12 games for the Sharks. In the first round of the playoffs against Colorado, he had three goals with two assists but the Sharks lost in six games. In 77 total games, he had 19 goals and 30 assists. He soon found enjoyment with playing for the Sharks, who stated that he was their priority player to sign back next season and he agreed with that assessment, never hitting the free agent market. While his scoring in San Jose never rose above 25 goals, his pairing on a line with Owen Nolan and Jeff Friesen in the 1999–2000 season saw Nolan score 44 goals. In the 2000–01 season, he played in 45 games and recorded nine goals and 37 assists. He recorded his 1,000th career point on October 14 with an assist versus the Boston Bruins, doing so in his 1,090th game.

He signed with the Colorado Avalanche on August 19, 2004 on a one-year contract for $2 million. He never played for the team, however, due to the 2004–05 NHL lockout that occurred the following month that took out the entire 2004–05 season. On September 7, 2005, he announced his retirement from the NHL. He retired as one of 42 players with over 700 assists in NHL history.

Damphousse was a member of the National Hockey League Players' Association (NHLPA) executive committee, serving as vice president under Trevor Linden. He was hired to be the NHLPA director of business relations in February 2006. In the summer of 2007, he announced his departure from the union to devote more time to his Le Scandinave Spa business.

Damphousse announced his retirement on September 7, 2005. As of 2013, lives in Montreal and serves as a hockey analyst with the French-language television network RDS.

== Personal ==
On April 14, 2011, Damphousse was charged by Montreal police with six counts of assaulting his spouse after allegations made by his wife. The incidents were alleged to have occurred between January 2008 and early 2011. Damphousse categorically denied the allegations brought against him and also filed a complaint against his wife for assault. On June 19, 2013, the Crown dropped all charges against the ex-hockey player, although the Crown announced intentions to pursue its case against Allana Henderson, now Damphousse's ex-wife, for armed assault and theft under $5,000. Henderson was accused of committing assault with her vehicle and stealing a briefcase from her ex-husband. On January 14, 2015, the Crown dropped all charges against Henderson.

== Awards and achievements ==
- QMJHL Second All-Star Team – 1986
- NHL All-Star Game – 1991, 1992, 2001, 2002
- NHL All-Star Game MVP – 1991
- Stanley Cup champion – 1993

== Career statistics ==
=== Regular season and playoffs ===
			Regular season					Playoffs
Season	Team	League	GP	G	A	Pts	PIM	GP	G	A	Pts	PIM
1982–83	Bourassa Angevins	QMAAA	48	33	45	78	22	10	4	4	8	12
1983–84	Laval Voisins	QMJHL	66	29	36	65	25	12	5	3	8	4
1983–84	Laval Voisins	MC	—	—	—	—	—	3	0	0	0	4
1984–85	Laval Voisins	QMJHL	68	35	68	103	60	—	—	—	—	—
1985–86	Laval Titan	QMJHL	69	45	110	155	72	14	9	28	37	12
1986–87	Toronto Maple Leafs	NHL	80	21	25	46	26	12	1	5	6	8
1987–88	Toronto Maple Leafs	NHL	75	12	36	48	40	6	0	1	1	10
1988–89	Toronto Maple Leafs	NHL	80	26	42	68	75	—	—	—	—	—
1989–90	Toronto Maple Leafs	NHL	80	33	61	94	56	5	0	2	2	2
1990–91	Toronto Maple Leafs	NHL	79	26	47	73	65	—	—	—	—	—
1991–92	Edmonton Oilers	NHL	80	38	51	89	53	16	6	8	14	8
1992–93	Montreal Canadiens	NHL	84	39	58	97	98	20	11	12	23	16
1993–94	Montreal Canadiens	NHL	84	40	51	91	75	7	1	2	3	8
1994–95	EC Ratingen	DEL	11	5	6	11	24	—	—	—	—	—
1994–95	Montreal Canadiens	NHL	48	10	30	40	42	—	—	—	—	—
1995–96	Montreal Canadiens	NHL	80	38	56	94	158	6	4	4	8	0
1996–97	Montreal Canadiens	NHL	82	27	54	81	82	5	0	0	0	2
1997–98	Montreal Canadiens	NHL	76	18	41	59	58	10	3	6	9	22
1998–99	Montreal Canadiens	NHL	65	12	24	36	46	—	—	—	—	—
1998–99	San Jose Sharks	NHL	12	7	6	13	4	6	3	2	5	6
1999–2000	San Jose Sharks	NHL	82	21	49	70	58	12	1	7	8	16
2000–01	San Jose Sharks	NHL	45	9	37	46	62	6	2	1	3	14
2001–02	San Jose Sharks	NHL	82	20	38	58	60	12	2	6	8	12
2002–03	San Jose Sharks	NHL	82	23	38	61	66	—	—	—	—	—
2003–04	San Jose Sharks	NHL	82	12	29	41	66	17	7	7	14	20
NHL totals			1,378	432	773	1,205	1,190	140	41	63	104	144

=== International ===
Year	Team	Event	GP	G	A	Pts	PIM
1996	Canada	WCH	8	2	0	2	8

== See also ==
- List of NHL statistical leaders
- List of NHL players with 1,000 games played
- List of NHL players with 1,000 points

Preceded by Wendel Clark	Toronto Maple Leafs first-round draft pick 1986	Succeeded by Luke Richardson
Preceded by Pierre Turgeon	Montreal Canadiens captain 1996–99	Succeeded by Saku Koivu
Preceded by Mike Ricci	San Jose Sharks captain 2003; 20 games	Succeeded by Alyn McCauley
