= Benoît Hogue =

Canadian ice hockey player

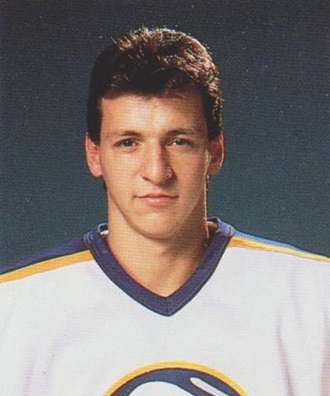
- Born: October 28, 1966 (age 59) Repentigny, Quebec, Canada
- Height: 5 ft 10 in (178 cm)
- Weight: 194 lb (88 kg; 13 st 12 lb)
- Position: Centre
- Shot: Left
- Played for: Buffalo Sabres; New York Islanders; Toronto Maple Leafs; Dallas Stars; Tampa Bay Lightning; Phoenix Coyotes; Boston Bruins; Washington Capitals
- NHL draft: 35th overall, 1985; Buffalo Sabres
- Playing career: 1986–2002

Benoît "Benny" Hogue (born October 28, 1966) is a Canadian former professional ice hockey left wing. He was drafted by the Buffalo Sabres in the second round, 35th overall, in the 1985 NHL entry draft.

== Playing career ==
After playing three seasons with the Saint-Jean Castors of the Quebec Major Junior Hockey League (QMJHL), Hogue joined the Sabres' American Hockey League (AHL) affiliate, the Rochester Americans, for the 1986–87 season. He made his National Hockey League (NHL) debut with the Sabres in the 1987–88 season, and remained with the Sabres until early in the 1991–92 season. Three games into the season, he was part of a blockbuster trade between the Sabres and the New York Islanders which involved seven players, including Pierre Turgeon and Pat LaFontaine.

Hogue's time in New York was the most productive of his career, as he scored 105 goals in three-plus seasons with the Islanders before joining the Toronto Maple Leafs. Hogue was a journeyman for the remainder of his career, playing for the Tampa Bay Lightning, Phoenix Coyotes, Boston Bruins, and three separate stints with the Dallas Stars. He joined the Washington Capitals late in the 2001–02 season and played the final nine games of his NHL career there.

In his NHL career, Hogue appeared in 863 games. He scored 222 goals and added 321 assists and won the Stanley Cup in 1999 with Dallas.

== Career statistics ==
| | | | Regular season | | | | | Playoffs |
| Season | Team | League | GP | G | A | Pts | PIM | GP | G | A | Pts | PIM |
|---|---|---|---|---|---|---|---|---|---|---|---|---|
| 1982–83 | Bourassa Angevins | QMAAA | 40 | 20 | 20 | 40 | 34 | 10 | 2 | 1 | 3 | 4 |
| 1983–84 | Saint-Jean Castors | QMJHL | 59 | 14 | 11 | 25 | 42 | 4 | 0 | 1 | 1 | 0 |
| 1984–85 | Saint-Jean Castors | QMJHL | 63 | 46 | 44 | 90 | 92 | 5 | 2 | 3 | 5 | 2 |
| 1985–86 | Saint-Jean Castors | QMJHL | 65 | 54 | 54 | 108 | 115 | 9 | 6 | 4 | 10 | 26 |
| 1986–87 | Rochester Americans | AHL | 52 | 14 | 20 | 34 | 52 | 12 | 5 | 4 | 9 | 8 |
| 1987–88 | Rochester Americans | AHL | 62 | 24 | 31 | 55 | 141 | 7 | 6 | 1 | 7 | 46 |
| 1987–88 | Buffalo Sabres | NHL | 3 | 1 | 1 | 2 | 0 | — | — | — | — | — |
| 1988–89 | Buffalo Sabres | NHL | 69 | 14 | 30 | 44 | 120 | 5 | 0 | 0 | 0 | 17 |
| 1989–90 | Buffalo Sabres | NHL | 45 | 11 | 7 | 18 | 79 | 3 | 0 | 0 | 0 | 10 |
| 1990–91 | Buffalo Sabres | NHL | 76 | 19 | 28 | 47 | 76 | 5 | 3 | 1 | 4 | 10 |
| 1991–92 | Buffalo Sabres | NHL | 3 | 0 | 1 | 1 | 0 | — | — | — | — | — |
| 1991–92 | New York Islanders | NHL | 72 | 30 | 45 | 75 | 67 | — | — | — | — | — |
| 1992–93 | New York Islanders | NHL | 70 | 33 | 42 | 75 | 108 | 18 | 6 | 6 | 12 | 31 |
| 1993–94 | New York Islanders | NHL | 83 | 36 | 33 | 69 | 73 | 4 | 0 | 1 | 1 | 4 |
| 1994–95 | New York Islanders | NHL | 33 | 6 | 4 | 10 | 34 | — | — | — | — | — |
| 1994–95 | Toronto Maple Leafs | NHL | 12 | 3 | 3 | 6 | 0 | — | — | — | — | — |
| 1995–96 | Toronto Maple Leafs | NHL | 44 | 12 | 25 | 37 | 68 | — | — | — | — | — |
| 1995–96 | Dallas Stars | NHL | 34 | 7 | 20 | 27 | 36 | — | — | — | — | — |
| 1996–97 | Dallas Stars | NHL | 73 | 19 | 24 | 43 | 54 | 7 | 2 | 2 | 4 | 6 |
| 1997–98 | Dallas Stars | NHL | 53 | 6 | 16 | 22 | 35 | 17 | 4 | 2 | 6 | 16 |
| 1998–99 | Tampa Bay Lightning | NHL | 62 | 11 | 14 | 25 | 50 | — | — | — | — | — |
| 1998–99 | Dallas Stars | NHL | 12 | 1 | 3 | 4 | 4 | 14 | 0 | 2 | 2 | 16 |
| 1999–2000 | Phoenix Coyotes | NHL | 27 | 3 | 10 | 13 | 10 | 5 | 1 | 2 | 3 | 2 |
| 2000–01 | Dallas Stars | NHL | 34 | 3 | 7 | 10 | 26 | 7 | 1 | 0 | 1 | 6 |
| 2001–02 | Dallas Stars | NHL | 32 | 3 | 3 | 6 | 24 | — | — | — | — | — |
| 2001–02 | Boston Bruins | NHL | 17 | 4 | 7 | 8 | 9 | — | — | — | — | — |
| 2001–02 | Washington Capitals | NHL | 9 | 0 | 1 | 1 | 4 | — | — | — | — | — |
| NHL totals | | | 863 | 222 | 321 | 543 | 877 | 92 | 17 | 16 | 33 | 124 |

== Awards and honors ==
| Award | Year |
|---|---|
| Stanley Cup (Dallas Stars) | 1998–99 |
| Bob Nystrom Award | 1992–1993 |
