= David Volek =

Czech former professional ice hockey player

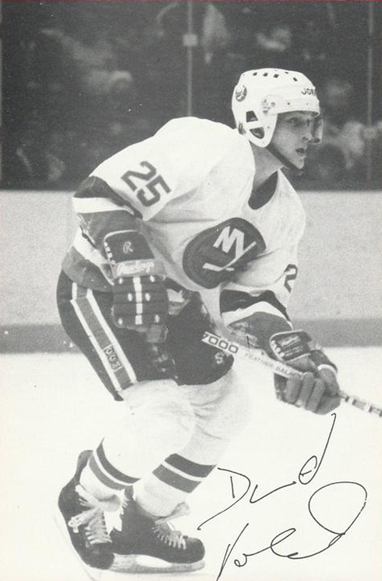
- Volek in 1989 photo
- Born: 16 August 1966 (age 59) Prague, Czechoslovakia
- Height: 6 ft 0 in (183 cm)
- Weight: 185 lb (84 kg; 13 st 3 lb)
- Position: Winger
- Shot: Left
- Played for: TJ Slavia PS Karlovy Vary; HC Sparta Praha; New York Islanders
- National team: Czechoslovakia
- NHL draft: 208th overall, 1984; New York Islanders
- Playing career: 1984–1996

David Volek (born 16 August 1966) is a Czech former professional ice hockey player.

Volek was born in the former Czechoslovakia, where he played in 1983–84 for TJ Slavia PS Karlovy Vary. He later moved to HC Sparta Praha and became a member of the Czechoslovak national ice hockey team for the 1988 Winter Olympics. In 1988 he gained permission from the Czech authorities to visit his parents in West Germany and used this permission to defect to Canada. He joined the New York Islanders, having been selected by them in the 1984 NHL entry draft, and was named to the NHL All-Rookie Team in 1988–89.

Volek is best remembered for scoring an overtime goal that eliminated the favoured and two-time defending Stanley Cup champion Pittsburgh Penguins from the 1993 Stanley Cup playoffs. The goal came at 5:16 of overtime in the seventh (and deciding) game of the second round of the playoffs. CBC Hockey Night in Canada announcer Chris Cuthbert called Volek's play in a dramatic fashion:

Samuelsson pass off a skate. Volek turns with Ferraro. Here they come, 2 on 1; Volek shoots, SCORES!!! David Volek, Islanders! And there’ll be a new Stanley Cup Champion in 1993!

The next year, a herniated disc forced Volek to retire from the NHL. Volek finished his NHL career, which was spent exclusively with the Islanders, with 95 goals and 154 assists for 249 points. He underwent back surgery the following year in an attempt to return to the game, but after five games with HC Sparta Praha, he was forced to retire for good.

Volek has been the assistant coach of HC Sparta Praha since 2005. Between his retirement from playing in 1996 and 2005 he was a scout.

== Career statistics ==
=== Regular season and playoffs ===
			Regular season					Playoffs
Season	Team	League	GP	G	A	Pts	PIM	GP	G	A	Pts	PIM
1982–83	TJ Slavia PS Karlovy Vary	CSSR-Jr	—	—	—	—	—	—	—	—	—	—
1983–84	TJ Slavia PS Karlovy Vary	CSSR-Jr	—	—	—	—	—	—	—	—	—	—
1984–85	TJ Sparta ČKD Praha	CSSR	32	5	5	10	14	—	—	—	—	—
1985–86	TJ Sparta ČKD Praha	CSSR	35	10	7	17	—	—	—	—	—	—
1986–87	TJ Sparta ČKD Praha	CSSR	39	27	25	52	38	—	—	—	—	—
1987–88	TJ Sparta ČKD Praha	CSSR	42	29	18	47	58	—	—	—	—	—
1988–89	New York Islanders	NHL	77	25	34	59	24	—	—	—	—	—
1989–90	New York Islanders	NHL	80	17	22	39	41	5	1	4	5	0
1990–91	New York Islanders	NHL	77	22	34	56	57	—	—	—	—	—
1991–92	New York Islanders	NHL	74	18	42	60	35	—	—	—	—	—
1992–93	New York Islanders	NHL	56	8	13	21	34	10	4	1	5	2
1993–94	New York Islanders	NHL	32	5	9	14	10	—	—	—	—	—
1995–96	HC Sparta Praha	ELH	5	3	2	5	16	—	—	—	—	—
1995–96	HC Slavia Becherovka Karlovy Vary	CZE II	16	7	4	11	—	—	—	—	—	—
1996–97	TJ Stadion Nymburk	CZE IV	—	—	—	—	—	—	—	—	—	—
1999–2000	NED Hockey Nymburk	CZE III	4	3	1	4	2	—	—	—	—	—
2000–01	NED Hockey Nymburk	CZE III	2	0	0	0	0	—	—	—	—	—
TCH totals			148	71	55	126	—	—	—	—	—	—
NHL totals			396	95	154	249	201	15	5	5	10	2

=== International ===
Year	Team	Event	GP	G	A	Pts	PIM
1983	Czechoslovakia	EJC	5	3	2	5	8
1984	Czechoslovakia	EJC	5	5	5	10	2
1986	Czechoslovakia	WJC	7	4	3	7	6
1987	Czechoslovakia	WC	10	3	1	4	2
1987	Czechoslovakia	CC	6	2	2	4	2
1988	Czechoslovakia	OLY	7	1	2	3	2
1991	Czechoslovakia	WC	10	3	2	5	8
Junior totals			17	12	10	22	16
Senior totals			33	9	7	16	14
