= Steve Thomas (ice hockey) =

Canadian ice hockey player

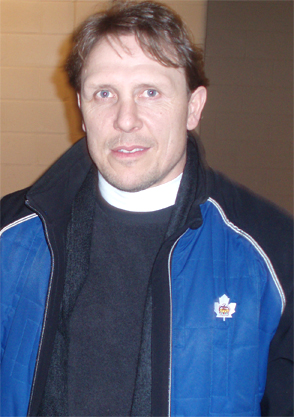
- Thomas in 2009
- Born: July 15, 1963 (age 63) Stockport, England
- Height: 5 ft 11 in (180 cm)
- Weight: 185 lb (84 kg; 13 st 3 lb)
- Position: Right wing
- Shot: Left
- Played for: Toronto Maple Leafs; Chicago Blackhawks; New York Islanders; New Jersey Devils; Mighty Ducks of Anaheim; Detroit Red Wings
- National team: Canada
- NHL draft: Undrafted
- Playing career: 1984–2004

Stephen Antony "Stumpy" Thomas (born July 15, 1963) is a Canadian former ice hockey right winger who played 20 seasons in the National Hockey League (NHL) for the Toronto Maple Leafs, Chicago Blackhawks, New York Islanders, New Jersey Devils, Mighty Ducks of Anaheim and Detroit Red Wings.

== Playing career ==
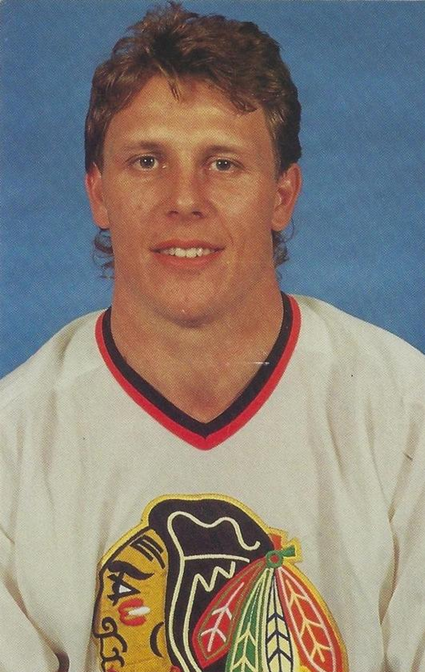
Thomas with the Chicago Blackhawks in 1987

Thomas was born in Stockport, England but was raised in Markham, Ontario, Canada where he attended Markham District High School. As he often coasted in school on his hockey skills, he once had a teacher tell him to "smarten up, Steve; hockey can only take you so far". He played junior hockey for the Toronto Marlboros of the OHL (he was the last original Toronto Marlboro to make it to the Maple Leafs of the NHL). Prior to playing in the NHL, Thomas won the Dudley "Red" Garrett Memorial Award in 1985 as the top rookie in the American Hockey League, while playing for the St. Catharines Saints.

Thomas went undrafted after his junior career but signed as a free agent with the Toronto Maple Leafs. He began his NHL career in the 1984–85 season. He developed into a bona-fide NHL goal scorer with Toronto, scoring 35 goals in the 1986–87 season. He was traded to the Chicago Blackhawks that summer and played for Chicago until 1991–92 and was then traded to the New York Islanders.

It would be with the Islanders that Thomas would have his best years. In the 1992–93 season, Thomas scored 37 goals and 50 assists for a career-high of 87 points. During the playoffs, when Islanders superstar Pierre Turgeon was injured by a Dale Hunter check in the first round, Thomas and teammate Ray Ferraro emerged as the unlikely heroes of the Islander's playoff run. Both made the top ten in postseason scoring as the Islanders made their Cinderella run to the Prince of Wales Conference finals. The next year, he set a career-high in goals with 42.

Thomas had second stints with the Leafs (1998–2001) and Chicago (2001–2002) before moving to the Mighty Ducks of Anaheim. His career looked to be over with Chicago; however, the trade to the Ducks instantly rejuvenated his career. After scoring just 4 goals with the Blackhawks, Thomas had 10 goals in the final 12 games of the season with the Ducks and added 4 more goals in the postseason as his team made it to their first Stanley Cup Finals. The Ducks had wanted to keep Thomas for 2003-2004 as well, but they ran out of money, and Thomas's absence negatively affected his former linemates.

Despite being considered a great playoff player, Thomas was never able to capture a Stanley Cup in his career. He came close in 2002–03 when his Mighty Ducks of Anaheim made it to the Stanley Cup Finals, the first of his and the team's, but they lost to the New Jersey Devils in a hard-fought 7 games.

Thomas signed a one-year contract (2003–2004) with the Detroit Red Wings before the 2004–05 NHL lockout and proved effective playing on a line with youngster Pavel Datsyuk and Brett Hull. At one stretch in the season, Thomas had 10 points in 13 games, and he enjoyed more ice time than he initially expected due to injuries among the Wings' roster. The Wings finished first in the league but lost in the second round of the playoffs to the Calgary Flames.

After the 2004–05 NHL lockout he was invited to the Toronto Maple Leafs tryout in 2005, but he was cut before the regular season started.

== Post-playing career ==
Thomas was an assistant/mentor coach for the St. Michael's Buzzers, a Jr. A team in Toronto.

On September 3, 2010, Thomas was named player development consultant for the Tampa Bay Lightning, working with former Red Wings teammate Steve Yzerman, who served as Tampa Bay's general manager. Thomas monitored and oversaw all of Tampa Bay's prospects. He later worked as an assistant coach for the Lightning from 2012 to 2016.

Thomas was named an assistant coach with the St. Louis Blues on June 30, 2016. He spent one season on the Blues' staff.

== Personal life ==
Thomas and his wife Lori have two children, a daughter Lauren (born 1994), and a son Christian (born 1992), who is currently playing for HC Bozen-Bolzano of the Austrian Hockey League. Christian Thomas was drafted 40th overall by the New York Rangers in the 2nd round of the 2010 NHL entry draft. Lauren married current Edmonton Oilers forward Adam Henrique. In his third OHL season in 2010–11, Christian finished second in the league with 54 goals and sixth in the league in scoring with 99 points, while also tying for the league lead in power-play goals. Steve and Christian Thomas are the first father-son combination to each score 50 goals in a single OHL season.

== Career statistics ==
=== Regular season and playoffs ===
			Regular season					Playoffs
Season	Team	League	GP	G	A	Pts	PIM	GP	G	A	Pts	PIM
1980–81	Markham Waxers	OPJHL	42	22	25	47	76	—	—	—	—	—
1980–81	Toronto Marlboros	OHL	1	0	0	0	0	—	—	—	—	—
1981–82	Markham Waxers	OPJHL	48	68	57	125	113	—	—	—	—	—
1981–82	Toronto Marlboros	OHL	—	—	—	—	—	7	4	1	5	4
1982–83	Toronto Marlboros	OHL	61	18	20	38	42	—	—	—	—	—
1983–84	Toronto Marlboros	OHL	70	51	54	105	77	9	2	6	8	26
1984–85	Toronto Maple Leafs	NHL	18	1	1	2	2	—	—	—	—	—
1984–85	St. Catharines Saints	AHL	64	42	48	90	56	—	—	—	—	—
1985–86	Toronto Maple Leafs	NHL	65	20	37	57	36	10	6	8	14	9
1985–86	St. Catharines Saints	AHL	19	18	14	32	35	—	—	—	—	—
1986–87	Toronto Maple Leafs	NHL	78	35	27	62	114	13	2	3	5	13
1987–88	Chicago Blackhawks	NHL	30	13	13	26	40	3	1	2	3	6
1988–89	Chicago Blackhawks	NHL	45	21	19	40	69	12	3	5	8	10
1989–90	Chicago Blackhawks	NHL	76	40	30	70	91	20	7	6	13	33
1990–91	Chicago Blackhawks	NHL	69	19	35	54	129	6	1	2	3	15
1991–92	Chicago Blackhawks	NHL	11	2	6	8	26	—	—	—	—	—
1991–92	New York Islanders	NHL	71	28	42	70	71	—	—	—	—	—
1992–93	New York Islanders	NHL	79	37	50	87	111	18	9	8	17	37
1993–94	New York Islanders	NHL	78	42	33	75	139	4	1	0	1	8
1994–95	New York Islanders	NHL	47	11	15	26	60	—	—	—	—	—
1995–96	New Jersey Devils	NHL	81	26	35	61	98	—	—	—	—	—
1996–97	New Jersey Devils	NHL	57	15	19	34	46	10	1	1	2	18
1997–98	New Jersey Devils	NHL	55	14	10	24	32	6	0	3	3	2
1998–99	Toronto Maple Leafs	NHL	78	28	45	73	33	17	6	3	9	12
1999–2000	Toronto Maple Leafs	NHL	81	26	37	63	68	12	6	3	9	10
2000–01	Toronto Maple Leafs	NHL	57	8	26	34	46	11	6	3	9	4
2001–02	Chicago Blackhawks	NHL	34	11	4	15	17	5	1	1	2	0
2002–03	Chicago Blackhawks	NHL	69	4	13	17	51	—	—	—	—	—
2002–03	Mighty Ducks of Anaheim	NHL	12	10	3	13	2	21	4	4	8	8
2003–04	Detroit Red Wings	NHL	44	10	12	22	25	6	0	1	1	2
NHL totals			1,235	421	512	933	1,306	174	54	53	107	187

=== International ===
Medal record

Representing Canada

World Championships
Gold medal – first place	1994 Italy	
Silver medal – second place	1991 Finland	
Silver medal – second place	1996 Austria	

Year	Team	Event	GP	G	A	Pts	PIM
1991	Canada	WC	10	5	3	8	12
1992	Canada	WC	5	2	2	4	4
1994	Canada	WC	6	1	5	6	0
1996	Canada	WC	8	2	3	5	29
Senior totals			29	10	13	23	45

== Trivia ==
Thomas appeared in the 1986 hockey-themed movie Youngblood alongside Rob Lowe and Keanu Reeves and, in one scene, is memorably towel-snapped by Patrick Swayze.

== See also ==
- List of National Hockey League players from the United Kingdom
- List of NHL players with 1,000 games played
